= 1980–81 Liverpool F.C. season =

English football club season

Liverpool
1980–81 season
- Manager: Bob Paisley
- First Division: 5th
- FA Cup: Fourth round
- League Cup: Winners
- FA Charity Shield: Winners
- European Cup: Winners
- Top goalscorer: League: Terry McDermott (13); All: Terry McDermott (22)
Home colours	Away colours	Third colours

The 1980–81 season was Liverpool Football Club's 89th season in existence and their 19th consecutive season in the First Division. It was a season of contrasts for Liverpool as they won the European Cup for the third time by defeating Real Madrid 1–0 in Paris, and winning the Football League Cup for the first time by defeating that season's Second Division champions West Ham United after a replay at Villa Park. They also beat West Ham in the Charity Shield.

The Football League season, however, turned out to be a big disappointment after successive titles in previous seasons, by only finishing fifth, and then losing to Everton in the Fourth Round of the FA Cup. It was to be the last season for a few players, and with Bob Paisley looking to the future bringing in players who would go on to feature regularly for the club for the rest of the decade and even the 1990s.

== Squad ==
=== Goalkeepers ===
- (England) Ray Clemence
- (England) Steve Ogrizovic
- (Zimbabwe) Bruce Grobbelaar

=== Defenders ===
- (Israel) Avi Cohen
- (England) Colin Irwin
- (England) Phil Neal
- (Scotland) Alan Hansen
- (England) Phil Thompson
- (England) Alan Kennedy
- (England) Richard Money

=== Midfielders ===
- (England) Jimmy Case
- (Republic of Ireland) Steve Heighway
- (England) Sammy Lee
- (England) Ray Kennedy
- (England) Terry McDermott
- (Republic of Ireland) Kevin Sheedy
- (Scotland) Graeme Souness
- (Republic of Ireland) Ronnie Whelan

=== Forwards ===
- (Scotland) Kenny Dalglish
- (England) Howard Gayle
- (England) David Johnson
- (Wales) Ian Rush
- (England) Colin Russell

== Squad statistics ==
=== Appearances and goals ===
No.	Pos	Nat	Player	Total		Division 1		FA Cup		Charity Shield		League Cup		European Cup	
No.	Pos	Nat	Player	Apps	Goals	Apps	Goals	Apps	Goals	Apps	Goals	Apps	Goals	Apps	Goals
	MF	(England) ENG	Jimmy Case	36	2	14+10	1	1+1	1	1+0	0	3+1	0	2+3	0
	GK	(England) ENG	Ray Clemence	62	0	41+0	0	2+0	0	1+0	0	9+0	0	9+0	0
	DF	(Israel) ISR	Avi Cohen	19	0	13+1	0	1+0	0	0+0	0	1+0	0	2+1	0
	FW	(Scotland) SCO	Kenny Dalglish	54	18	34+0	8	2+0	2	1+0	0	8+0	7	9+0	1
	FW	(England) ENG	David Fairclough	16	7	6+3	4	1+0	0	0+0	0	3+1	1	2+0	2
	FW	(England) ENG	Howard Gayle	5	1	3+1	1	0+0	0	0+0	0	0+0	0	0+1	0
	DF	(Scotland) SCO	Alan Hansen	54	3	36+0	1	0+0	0	1+0	0	8+0	1	9+0	1
	MF	(Republic of Ireland) IRL	Steve Heighway	10	0	4+2	0	0+0	0	0+0	0	1+0	0	1+2	0
	DF	(England) ENG	Colin Irwin	30	1	19+2	1	2+0	0	0+0	0	6+0	0	0+1	0
	FW	(England) ENG	David Johnson	41	13	29+0	8	1+0	0	1+0	0	5+0	4	5+0	1
	DF	(England) ENG	Alan Kennedy	33	4	19+0	2	1+0	0	1+0	0	6+0	1	6+0	1
	MF	(England) ENG	Ray Kennedy	62	13	41+0	8	2+0	1	1+0	0	9+0	2	9+0	2
	MF	(England) ENG	Sammy Lee	55	8	37+0	4	2+0	0	0+0	0	7+0	2	9+0	2
	MF	(England) ENG	Terry McDermott	60	22	40+0	13	2+0	1	1+0	1	9+0	1	8+0	6
	DF	(England) ENG	Richard Money	17	0	12+2	0	1+0	0	0+0	0	1+0	0	1+0	0
	DF	(England) ENG	Phil Neal	63	3	42+0	2	2+0	0	1+0	0	9+0	0	9+0	1
	GK	(England) ENG	Steve Ogrizovic	1	0	1+0	0	0+0	0	0+0	0	0+0	0	0+0	0
	FW	(Wales) WAL	Ian Rush	9	0	7+0	0	0+0	0	0+0	0	1+0	0	1+0	0
	FW	(England) ENG	Colin Russell	1	0	0+1	0	0+0	0	0+0	0	0+0	0	0+0	0
	MF	(Republic of Ireland) IRL	Kevin Sheedy	1	0	1+0	0	0+0	0	0+0	0	0+0	0	0+0	0
	MF	(Scotland) SCO	Graeme Souness	55	13	37+0	6	1+0	0	1+0	0	8+0	1	8+0	6
	DF	(England) ENG	Phil Thompson	40	0	25+0	0	1+0	0	1+0	0	6+0	0	7+0	0
	MF	(Republic of Ireland) IRL	Ronnie Whelan	1	1	1+0	1	0+0	0	0+0	0	0+0	0	0+0	0

== League table ==
Pos	Team	Pld	W	D	L	GF	GA	GD	Pts	Qualification or relegation
3	Arsenal	42	19	15	8	61	45	+16	53	Qualification for the UEFA Cup first round
4	West Bromwich Albion	42	20	12	10	60	42	+18	52	Qualification for the UEFA Cup first round
5	Liverpool	42	17	17	8	62	42	+20	51	Qualification for the European Cup first round (Note: Liverpool qualified for the European Cup first round as the 1980–81 European Cup winners.)
6	Southampton	42	20	10	12	76	56	+20	50	Qualification for the UEFA Cup first round
7	Nottingham Forest	42	19	12	11	62	44	+18	50	

Source: World Football
Rules for classification: 1) Points; 2) Goal difference; 3) Goals scored

== Results ==
=== First Division ===
Date	Opponents	Venue	Result	Scorers	Attendance	Report 1	Report 2
16-Aug-80	Crystal Palace	H	3–0	Dalglish 25', R. Kennedy 32', A. Kennedy 83'	42,777	Report	Report
19-Aug-80	Coventry City	A	0–0		22,807	Report	Report
23-Aug-80	Leicester City	A	0–2		28,455	Report	Report
30-Aug-80	Norwich City	H	4–1	Hansen 44', McDermott 65', A. Kennedy 72', Johnson 87'	35,315	Report	Report
06-Sep-80	Birmingham City	A	1–1	Dalglish 49'	27,042	Report	Report
13-Sep-80	West Bromwich Albion	H	4–0	McDermott 27' (pen.), Souness 44', Fairclough (2) 67', 71'	36,792	Report	Report
20-Sep-80	Southampton	A	2–2	Souness 8', Fairclough 56'	24,085	Report	Report
27-Sep-80	Brighton & Hove Albion	H	4–1	Souness (2) 37', 57', McDermott 56' (pen.), Fairclough 83'	35,836	Report	Report
04-Oct-80	Manchester City	A	3–0	Dalglish 38', Souness 52', Lee 83'	41,022	Report	Report
07-Oct-80	Middlesbrough	H	4–2	McDermott (2) 1', 79' (pen.), R. Kennedy 61', Dalglish 86'	28,204	Report	Report
11-Oct-80	Ipswich Town	H	1–1	McDermott 39' (pen.)	48,084	Report	Report
18-Oct-80	Everton	A	2–2	Lee 23', Dalglish 56'	52,565	Report	Report
25-Oct-80	Arsenal	H	1–1	Souness 48'	40,310	Report	Report
01-Nov-80	Stoke City	A	2–2	Johnson 24', Dalglish 79'	22,864	Report	Report
08-Nov-80	Nottingham Forest	H	0–0		43,143	Report	Report
11-Nov-80	Coventry City	H	2–1	Johnson (2) 28', 80'	26,744	Report	Report
15-Nov-80	Crystal Palace	A	2–2	R. Kennedy 45', McDermott 77'	31,154	Report	Report
22-Nov-80	Aston Villa	H	2–1	Dalglish 66', 88'	48,114	Report	Report
25-Nov-80	Wolverhampton Wanderers	A	1–4	Neal 44'	25,497	Report	Report
29-Nov-80	Sunderland	A	4–2	Johnson 14', McDermott 35', Lee (2) 82', 84'	32,340	Report	Report
06-Dec-80	Tottenham Hotspur	H	2–1	Johnson 19', R. Kennedy 59'	39,545	Report	Report
13-Dec-80	Ipswich Town	A	1–1	Case 61'	32,274	Report	Report
20-Dec-80	Wolverhampton Wanderers	H	1–0	R. Kennedy 33'	33,563	Report	Report
26-Dec-80	Manchester United	A	0–0		57,073	Report	Report
27-Dec-80	Leeds United	H	0–0		44,086	Report	Report
10-Jan-81	Aston Villa	A	0–2		47,960	Report	Report
17-Jan-81	Norwich City	A	1–0	McDermott 23'	23,829	Report	Report
31-Jan-81	Leicester City	H	1–2	Young o.g. 15'	35,154	Report	Report
07-Feb-81	West Bromwich Albion	A	0–2		27,905	Report	Report
14-Feb-81	Birmingham City	H	2–2	Johnson 25', Neal 33'	32,199	Report	Report
21-Feb-81	Brighton & Hove Albion	A	2–2	Johnson 27', McDermott 65'	23,275	Report	Report
28-Feb-81	Southampton	H	2–0	R. Kennedy 13', McDermott 60'	41,575	Report	Report
21-Mar-81	Everton	H	1–0	Bailey o.g. 77'	49,743	Report	Report
28-Mar-81	Arsenal	A	0–1		47,058	Report	Report
03-Apr-81	Stoke City	H	3–0	Whelan 27', McDermott (2) 52', 81'	33,308	Report	Report
11-Apr-81	Nottingham Forest	A	0–0		27,363	Report	Report
14-Apr-81	Manchester United	H	0–1		31,276	Report	Report
18-Apr-81	Leeds United	A	0–0		39,206	Report	Report
25-Apr-81	Tottenham Hotspur	A	1–1	Gayle 25'	35,334	Report	Report
02-May-81	Sunderland	H	0–1		40,337	Report	Report
05-May-81	Middlesbrough	A	2–1	R. Kennedy 7', Irwin 28'	19,102	Report	Report
19-May-81	Manchester City	H	1–0	R. Kennedy 16'	24,462	Report	Report

=== FA Charity Shield ===
9 August 1980
15:00 UTC+1

Liverpool	1–0	West Ham United
McDermott 17'

Wembley Stadium, London
Attendance: 90,000

Liverpool	West Ham United

Liverpool:
GK	1	(England) Ray Clemence
DF	2	(England) Phil Neal
DF	3	(England) Alan Kennedy
DF	4	(England) Phil Thompson (c)
MF	5	(England) Ray Kennedy
DF	6	(Scotland) Alan Hansen
FW	7	(Scotland) Kenny Dalglish
MF	8	(England) Jimmy Case
FW	9	(England) David Johnson
MF	10	(England) Terry McDermott
MF	11	(Scotland) Graeme Souness
Manager:
(England) Bob Paisley

West Ham United
GK	1	(England) Phil Parkes
DF	2	(Scotland) Ray Stewart
DF	3	(England) Paul Brush
DF	4	(England) Billy Bonds
DF	5	(England) Alvin Martin
MF	6	(England) Alan Devonshire
MF	7	(England) Paul Allen
FW	8	(England) Pat Holland
FW	9	(England) David Cross
FW	10	(England) Trevor Brooking
MF	11	(England) Geoff Pike
Substitutes:
FW	12	(England) Nicky Morgan	Substituted on
Manager:
(England) John Lyall

Match rules

- 90 minutes, no extra time
- Five named substitutes
- Maximum of three substitutions

=== FA Cup ===
Date	Opponents	Venue	Result	Scorers	Attendance	Report 1	Report 2
03-Jan-81	Altrincham	H	4–1	McDermott 27', Dalglish (2) 39', 54', R. Kennedy 88'	37,170	Report	Report
24-Jan-81	Everton	A	1–2	Case 76'	53,804	Report	Report

=== League Cup ===
Date	Opponents	Venue	Result	Scorers	Attendance	Report 1	Report 2
27-Aug-80	Bradford City	A	0–1		16,232.	Report	Report
02-Sep-80	Bradford City	H	4–0	Dalglish (2) 9', 36', R. Kennedy 34', Johnson 59'	22,807	Report	Report
23-Sep-80	Swindon Town	H	5–0	Lee (2) 7', 85', Dalglish 17', Cockerill o.g. 75', Fairclough 80'	28,455	Report	Report
28-Oct-80	Portsmouth	H	4–1	Dalglish 22', Johnson (2) 39', 80', Souness 85'	35,836	Report	Report
02-Dec-80	Birmingham City	H	3–1	Dalglish 23', McDermott 66', Johnson 85'	35,315	Report	Report
14-Jan-81	Manchester City	A	1–0	R. Kennedy 81'	27,042	Report	Report
10-Feb-81	Manchester City	H	1–1	Dalglish 23'	36,792	Report	Report

League Cup final

14 March 1981
15:00 GMT

Liverpool	1–1 (a.e.t.)	West Ham United
A. Kennedy 118'		Stewart 120'

Wembley Stadium, London
Attendance: 100,000
Referee: Clive Thomas

Liverpool	West Ham United

1	(England) Ray Clemence
2	(England) Phil Neal (c)
3	(England) Alan Kennedy
4	(England) Colin Irwin
5	(England) Ray Kennedy
6	(Scotland) Alan Hansen
7	(Scotland) Kenny Dalglish
8	(England) Sammy Lee
9	(Republic of Ireland) Steve Heighway	Substituted off
10	(England) Terry McDermott
11	(Scotland) Graeme Souness
Substitute:
12	(England) Jimmy Case	Substituted on
Manager:
(England) Bob Paisley

1	(England) Phil Parkes
2	(Scotland) Ray Stewart
3	(England) Frank Lampard Sr.
4	(England) Billy Bonds (c)
5	(England) Alvin Martin
6	(England) Alan Devonshire
7	(England) Jimmy Neighbour
8	(England) Paul Goddard	Substituted off
9	(England) David Cross
10	(England) Trevor Brooking
11	(England) Geoff Pike
Substitute:
12	(England) Stuart Pearson	Substituted on
Manager:
(England) John Lyall

League Cup final replay

1 April 1981
19:30 GMT

Liverpool	2–1	West Ham United
Dalglish 25'; Hansen 28'		Goddard 5'

Villa Park, Birmingham
Attendance: 36,693
Referee: Clive Thomas

Liverpool	West Ham United

1	(England) Ray Clemence
2	(England) Phil Neal
3	(England) Alan Kennedy
4	(England) Phil Thompson (c)
5	(England) Ray Kennedy
6	(Scotland) Alan Hansen
7	(Scotland) Kenny Dalglish
8	(England) Sammy Lee
9	(Wales) Ian Rush
10	(England) Terry McDermott
11	(England) Jimmy Case
Substitute:
12	(England) Colin Irwin
Manager:
(England) Bob Paisley

1	(England) Phil Parkes
2	(Scotland) Ray Stewart
3	(England) Frank Lampard Sr.
4	(England) Billy Bonds (c)
5	(England) Alvin Martin
6	(England) Alan Devonshire
7	(England) Jimmy Neighbour
8	(England) Paul Goddard
9	(England) David Cross
10	(England) Trevor Brooking
11	(England) Geoff Pike
Substitute:
12	(England) Stuart Pearson
Manager:
(England) John Lyall

=== European Cup ===
Date	Opponents	Venue	Result	Scorers	Attendance	Report 1	Report 2
17-Sep-80	Oulu Palloseura	A	1–1	McDermott 15'	14,000	Report	Report
01-Oct-80	Oulu Palloseura	H	10–1	Souness (3) 5', 24', 52' (pen.), McDermott (3) 15', 41', 83', Lee 53', R. Kennedy 66', Fairclough (2) 68', 81'	21,013	Report	Report
22-Oct-80	Aberdeen	A	1–0	McDermott 5'	24,000	Report	Report
05-Nov-80	Aberdeen	H	4–0	Miller o.g. 37', Neal 43', Dalglish 58', Hansen 71'	36,182	Report	Report
04-Mar-81	CSKA Sofia	H	5–1	Souness (3) 16', 51', 80', Lee 45', McDermott 62'	37,255	Report	Report
18-Mar-81	CSKA Sofia	A	1–0	Johnson 10'	65,000	Report	Report
08-Apr-81	Bayern Munich	H	0–0		44,543	Report	Report
22-Apr-81	Bayern Munich	A	1–1	R. Kennedy 83'	77,600	Report	Report

European Cup final

27 May 1981
20:15 CEST

Real Madrid (Spain)	0–1	(England) Liverpool
	Overview Report MatchCentre	A. Kennedy 82'

Parc des Princes, Paris
Attendance: 48,360
Referee: Károly Palotai (Hungary)

Real Madrid	Liverpool

GK	1	(Spain) Agustín Rodríguez
DF	2	(Spain) Rafael García Cortés		(substituted off) 87'
DF	3	(Spain) José Antonio Camacho
MF	4	(Germany) Uli Stielike	(yellow card) 59'
DF	5	(Spain) Andrés Sabido
MF	6	(Spain) Vicente del Bosque
FW	7	(Spain) Juanito
MF	8	(Spain) Ángel de los Santos
FW	9	(Spain) Santillana (c)
DF	10	(Spain) Antonio García Navajas
FW	11	(England) Laurie Cunningham
Substitutes:
GK		(Spain) Miguel Ángel González
DF		(Spain) Isidoro San José
MF		(Spain) Ángel
MF		(Spain) García Hernández
MF	16	(Spain) Francisco Pineda		(substituted on) 87'
Manager:
(Socialist Federal Republic of Yugoslavia) Vujadin Boškov

GK	1	(England) Ray Clemence
RB	2	(England) Phil Neal
LB	3	(England) Alan Kennedy
CB	4	(England) Phil Thompson (c)
LM	5	(England) Ray Kennedy	(yellow card) 29'
CB	6	(Scotland) Alan Hansen
CF	7	(Scotland) Kenny Dalglish		(substituted off) 85'
RM	8	(England) Sammy Lee
CF	9	(England) David Johnson
CM	10	(England) Terry McDermott
CM	11	(Scotland) Graeme Souness
Substitutes:
MF	12	(England) Jimmy Case		(substituted on) 85'
GK	13	(England) Steve Ogrizovic
DF	14	(England) Colin Irwin
DF	15	(England) Richard Money
FW	16	(England) Howard Gayle
Manager:
(England) Bob Paisley
