= 1981–82 West Ham United F.C. season =

English football team season

West Ham United
1981–82 season
- Chairman: Len Cearns
- Manager: John Lyall
- Stadium: Boleyn Ground
- First Division: First Division 9th
- FA Cup: Fourth round
- League Cup: Third round
- Top goalscorer: League: David Cross (16); All: David Cross (20)
Home colours

The 1981–82 West Ham United F.C. season was their first season in the First Division after their promotion the previous season. The club was managed by John Lyall and the team captain was Billy Bonds.

== Season summary ==
The season started well for West Ham and they went unbeaten in their first nine league games. By the end of the year they sat in 7th place in the league. Four defeats in a row in December and January and a slump in form then occurred and they reached a low position of 14th at the end of February 1982. They finished in 9th place having drawn 10 of their home games and 16 games home and away. David Cross was the top scorer with 20 goals in all competitions and 16 in the league. The next highest scorer was Paul Goddard with 17. Ray Stewart made the most appearances; 51 in all competitions. The season saw the only appearance for West Ham by future Liverpool and Ireland player, Ray Houghton and the last West Ham appearance for 1980 FA Cup Final winner with West Ham, Stuart Pearson.

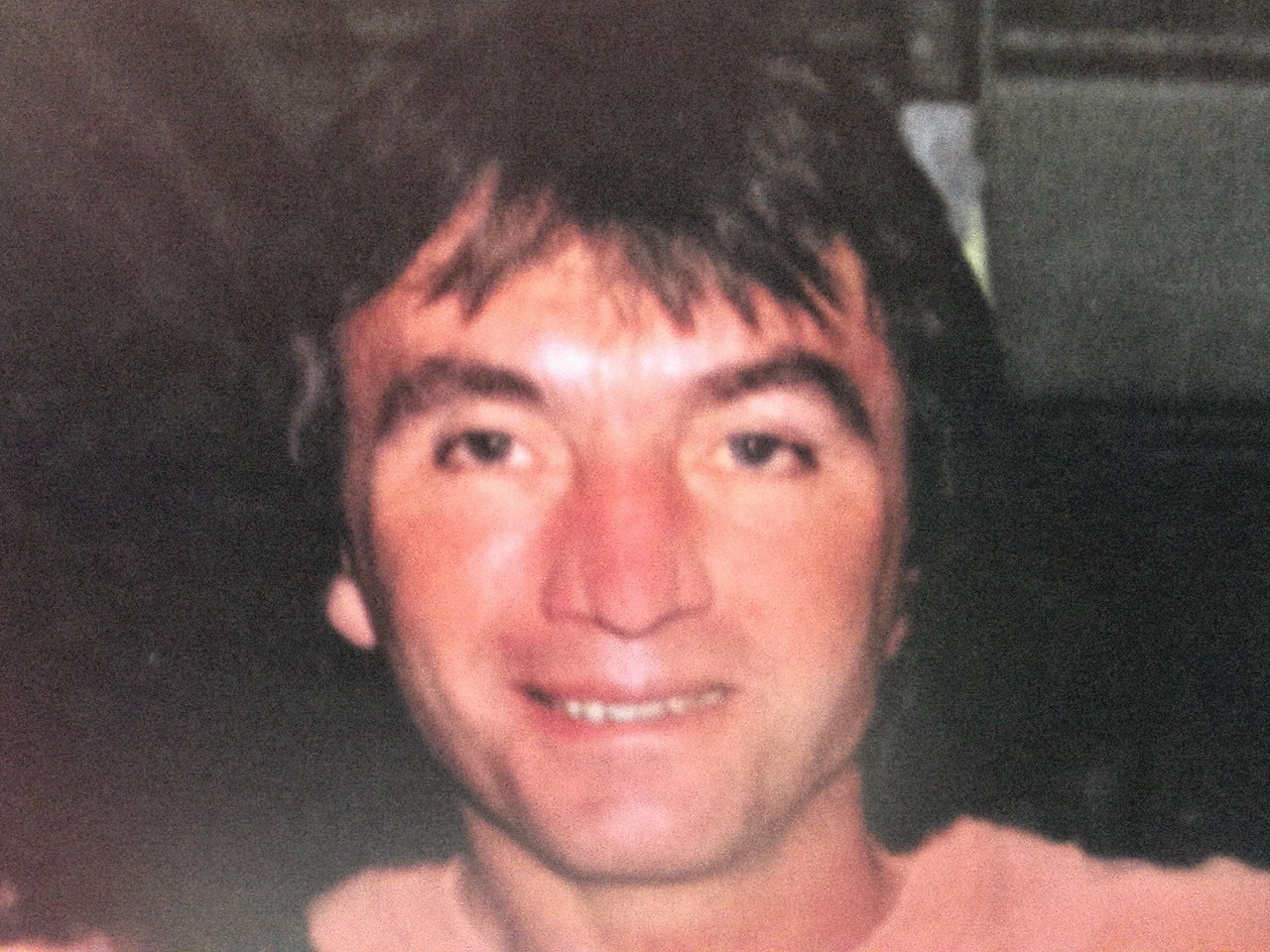
Club captain, Billy Bonds

=== First Division ===
Pos	Team	Pld	W	D	L	GF	GA	GD	Pts	Qualification or relegation
7	Southampton	42	19	9	14	72	67	+5	66	Qualification for the UEFA Cup first round
8	Everton	42	17	13	12	56	50	+6	64	
9	West Ham United	42	14	16	12	66	57	+9	58	
10	Manchester City	42	15	13	14	49	50	−1	58	
11	Aston Villa	42	15	12	15	55	53	+2	57	Qualification for the European Cup first round (Note: Aston Villa qualified for the European Cup first round as the 1981–82 European Cup winners.)

Source: World Football
Rules for classification: 1) Points; 2) Goal difference; 3) Goals scored

== Results ==
West Ham United's score comes first

=== Legend ===
Win	Draw	Loss

=== Football League First Division ===
Date	Opponent	Venue	Result	Attendance	Scorers
29 August 1981	Brighton and Hove Albion	H	1–1	30,468	Stewart
2 September 1981	Tottenham Hotspur	A	4–0	41,200	Cross (4)
5 September 1981	Sunderland	A	2–0	28,347	Goddard, Cross
12 September 1981	Stoke City	H	3–2	28,774	Stewart, Goddard (2)
19 September 1981	West Bromwich Albion	A	0–0	19,429	
22 September 1981	Southampton	H	4–2	34,026	Goddard (3), Pike
26 September 1981	Liverpool	H	1–1	30,802	Pike
3 October 1981	Birmingham City	A	2–2	22,290	Cross (2)
10 October 1981	Everton	H	1–1	31,608	Martin
17 October 1981	Aston Villa	A	2–3	32,064	Cross, Brooking
24 October 1981	Notts County	A	1–1	12,456	Brooking
31 October 1981	Middlesbrough	H	3–2	27,604	Stewart, Neighbour, Goddard
7 November 1981	Nottingham Forest	A	0–0	26,327	
21 November 1981	Coventry City	H	5–2	26,065	Stewart, Martin (2), Neighbour, Brooking
28 November 1981	Leeds United	A	3–3	25,637	Cross, Brooking (2)
5 December 1981	Arsenal	H	1–2	33,833	Pearson
5 January 1982	Liverpool	A	0–3	28,427	
16 January 1982	Brighton and Hove Albion	A	0–1	22,591	
27 January 1982	Manchester United	A	0–1	41,291	
30 January 1982	West Bromwich Albion	H	3–1	24,423	Goddard, Cross (2)
2 February 1982	Manchester City	H	1–1	26,522	Bonds
6 February 1982	Stoke City	A	1–2	11,987	Van der Elst
13 February 1982	Birmingham City	H	2–2	22,512	Stewart, Orr
20 February 1982	Southampton	A	1–2	24,026	Stewart
27 February 1982	Everton	A	0–0	28,598	
2 March 1982	Ipswich Town	A	2–0	24,846	Devonshire, Van der Elst
6 March 1982	Aston Villa	H	2–2	26,894	Stewart, Van der Elst
13 March 1982	Notts County	H	1–0	22,145	Stewart
20 March 1982	Middlesbrough	A	3–2	12,134	Goddard (2), Van der Elst
27 March 1982	Nottingham Forest	H	0–1	24,633	
30 March 1982	Swansea City	A	1–0	20,272	Van der Elst
3 April 1982	Manchester City	A	1–0	30,875	Goddard
6 April 1982	Wolverhampton Wanderers	H	3–1	20,651	Martin, Goddard (2)
10 April 1982	Swansea City	H	1–1	26,566	Goddard
13 April 1982	Ipswich Town	H	2–3	29,050	Cross (2)
17 April 1982	Coventry City	A	0–1	13,446	
24 April 1982	Leeds United	H	4–3	24,478	Stewart, Cross, Brooking (2)
1 May 1982	Arsenal	A	0–2	34,977	
4 May 1982	Sunderland	H	1–1	17,130	Stewart
8 May 1982	Manchester United	H	1–1	26,377	Cross
10 May 1982	Tottenham Hotspur	H	2–2	27,667	Goddard, Brooking
15 May 1982	Wolverhampton Wanderers	A	1–2	13,283	Cross

=== FA Cup ===
Round	Date	Opponent	Venue	Result	Attendance	Goalscorers
R3	2 January 1982	Everton	H	2–1	24,431	Bonds, Cross
R4	23 January 1982	Watford	A	0–2	27,004	

=== League Cup ===
Round	Date	Opponent	Venue	Result	Attendance	Goalscorers
R2 First Leg	7 October 1981	Derby County	A	3–2	13,764	Stewart, Cross, Brooking
R2 Second Leg	27 October 1981	Derby County	H	2–0 (won 5–2 on agg)	21,043	Goddard (2)
R3	10 November 1981	West Bromwich Albion	H	2–2	24,168	Stewart, Cross
R3 Replay	24 November 1981	West Bromwich Albion	A	1–1 aet	15,869	Stewart
R3 2nd Replay	1 December 1981	West Bromwich Albion	H	0–1	24,760	

== Squad ==
Note: Flags indicate national team as defined under FIFA eligibility rules; some limited exceptions apply. Players may hold more than one non-FIFA nationality.

Pos.	Nation	Player
MF	ENG	Paul Allen
FW	ENG	Dale Banton
MF	ENG	Bobby Barnes
DF	ENG	Billy Bonds (captain)
MF	ENG	Trevor Brooking
DF	ENG	Paul Brush
FW	SCO	George Cowie
FW	ENG	David Cross
MF	ENG	Alan Devonshire
FW	ENG	Paul Goddard
MF	IRL	Ray Houghton

Pos.	Nation	Player
DF	ENG	Everald La Ronde
DF	ENG	Frank Lampard
DF	ENG	Alvin Martin
GK	SCO	Tom McAlister
MF	ENG	Jimmy Neighbour
DF	SCO	Neil Orr
GK	ENG	Phil Parkes
FW	ENG	Stuart Pearson
MF	ENG	Geoff Pike
DF	SCO	Ray Stewart
FW	BEL	François Van der Elst
