= 1979–80 West Ham United F.C. season =

English football team season

West Ham United
1979–80 season
- Chairman: Len Cearns
- Manager: John Lyall
- Stadium: Boleyn Ground
- Second Division: 7th
- FA Cup: Winners
- League Cup: Quarter-finals
- Top goalscorer: League: David Cross (12); All: Cross (18)
- Average home league attendance: 22,868
Home colours

West Ham United finished in seventh place in the Second Division in the 1979–80 season.

== Season summary ==
West Ham United's season saw them gain a 1–0 victory by way of a Trevor Brooking header in the FA Cup final against Arsenal, who had been in the previous two FA Cup Finals, had just finished 4th in the First Division and were the overwhelming favourites. As of 2026, it is the last time a team playing outside the top division has won the competition.

== League table ==
Pos	Team	Pld	W	D	L	GF	GA	GD	Pts	Qualification or relegation
5	Queens Park Rangers	42	18	13	11	75	53	+22	49	
6	Luton Town	42	16	17	9	66	45	+21	49	
7	West Ham United	42	20	7	15	54	43	+11	47	Qualification for the Cup Winners' Cup first round (Note: West Ham United qualified for the Cup Winners' Cup first round as the 1979–80 FA Cup winners.)
8	Cambridge United	42	14	16	12	61	53	+8	44	
9	Newcastle United	42	15	14	13	53	49	+4	44	

Rules for classification: 1) Points; 2) Goal difference; 3) Goals scored

== Results ==
=== Football League Second Division ===
Date	Opponent	Venue	Result	Attendance	Goalscorers
18 August 1979	Wrexham	A	0–1	13,036	
20 August 1979	Chelsea	H	0–1	31,627	
25 August 1979	Oldham Athletic	H	1–0	18,319	Holland
1 September 1979	Watford	A	0–2	23,329	
8 September 1979	Preston North End	A	1–1	10,460	Cross
15 September 1979	Sunderland	H	2–0	24,021	Cross, Pearson
22 September 1979	Queens Park Rangers	A	0–3	24,692	
29 September 1979	Burnley	H	2–1	18,327	Stewart (pen), Lansdowne
6 October 1979	Newcastle United	H	1–1	23,206	Cross
13 October 1979	Leicester City	A	2–1	22,472	Martin, Cross
20 October 1979	Luton Town	H	1–2	25,049	Allen
27 October 1979	Notts County	A	1–0	12,256	Holland
3 November 1979	Wrexham	H	1–0	20,595	Pike
10 November 1979	Fulham	A	2–1	16,476	Stewart (pen), Cross
14 November 1979	Chelsea	A	1–2	30,859	Holland
17 November 1979	Swansea City	H	2–0	21,210	Brooking, Cross
24 November 1979	Cardiff City	H	3–0	20,242	Cross, Stewart (2 pen)
1 December 1979	Charlton Athletic	A	0–1	19,021	
8 December 1979	Bristol Rovers	H	2–1	17,763	Cross (2)
15 December 1979	Shrewsbury Town	A	0–3	8,513	
21 December 1979	Cambridge United	H	3–1	11,721	Stewart, Pearson, Neighbour
1 January 1980	Orient	A	4–0	23,885	Pearson (2), Devonshire, Pike
12 January 1980	Watford	H	1–1	23,553	Bonds
19 January 1980	Preston North End	H	2–0	17,603	Stewart (pen), Allen
9 February 1980	Queens Park Rangers	H	2–1	26,037	Pearson, Hazell (o.g)
19 February 1980	Burnley	A	1–0	10,610	Devonshire
23 February 1980	Leicester City	H	3–1	27,762	Pike, Cross, Holland
1 March 1980	Luton Town	A	1–1	20,040	Stewart
11 March 1980	Notts County	H	1–2	24,844	Pike
15 March 1980	Newcastle United	A	0–0	25,431	
22 March 1980	Fulham	H	2–3	30,030	Devonshire, Stewart (pen)
29 March 1980	Swansea City	A	1–2	13,275	Devonshire
1 April 1980	Cambridge United	A	0–2	8,863	
5 April 1980	Orient	H	2–0	22,066	Gray (o.g.), Brooking
7 April 1980	Birmingham City	A	0–0	28,377	
19 April 1980	Cardiff City	A	1–0	12,076	Stewart
22 April 1980	Birmingham City	H	1–2	37,167	Martin
26 April 1980	Shrewsbury Town	H	1–3	19,765	Brooking
29 April 1980	Oldham Athletic	A	0–0	8,214	
3 May 1980	Bristol Rovers	A	2–0	9,824	Devonshire, Cross
5 May 1980	Charlton Athletic	H	4–1	19,314	Pike, Morgan, Cross, Stewart
12 May 1980	Sunderland	A	0–2	47,000	

=== FA Cup ===
Round	Date	Opponent	Venue	Result	Attendance	Goalscorers
R3	5 January 1980	West Bromwich Albion	A	1–1	20,572	Pearson
R3 replay	8 January 1980	West Bromwich Albion	H	2–1	30,689	Pike, Brooking
R4	26 January 1980	Orient	A	3–2	21,521	Gray (o.g.), Stewart (2; 1 pen)
R5	16 February 1980	Swansea City	H	2–0	30,497	Allen, Cross
R6	8 March 1980	Aston Villa	H	1–0	36,393	Stewart (pen)
SF	12 April 1980	Everton	N	1–1	47,685	Pearson
SF replay	16 April 1980	Everton	N	2–1 (aet)	40,720	Devonshire, Lampard
F	10 May 1980	Arsenal	N	1–0	100,000	Brooking

=== League Cup ===
Round	Date	Opponent	Venue	Result	Attendance	Goalscorers
R2 1st leg	28 August 1979	Barnsley	H	3–1	12,320	Brooking, Pearson, Cross
R2 2nd leg	4 September 1979	Barnsley	A	2–0 (5–1 on agg)	15,898	Cross (2)
R3	25 September 1979	Southend United	H	1–1	19,658	Cross
R3 replay	1 October 1979	Southend United	A	0–0 (aet)	22,497	
R3 2nd replay	8 October 1979	Southend United	H	5–1	19,718	Lansdowne (3), Holland, Stewart (pen)
R4	31 October 1979	Sunderland	A	1–1	30,302	Pike 67'
R4 replay	5 November 1979	Sunderland	H	2–1	24,454	Martin 9'; Cross 49'
QF	4 December 1979	Nottingham Forest	H	0–0	35,856	
QF replay	12 December 1979	Nottingham Forest	A	0–3 (aet)	25,462	

== Squad ==
No.		Player	Position	Lge Apps	Lge Gls	FAC Apps	FAC Gls	LC Apps	LC Gls	Date Signed	Previous club
FA Cup Final Team
1	(England)	Phil Parkes	GK	40		8		8		1979	Queens Park Rangers
2	(Scotland)	Ray Stewart	RB	38	10	8	3	8	1	August 1979	Dundee United
3	(England)	Frank Lampard	LB	35(1)		7	1	6		1964	Academy
4	(England)	Billy Bonds (Captain)	CD	34	1	5		9		May 1967	Charlton Athletic
5	(England)	Alvin Martin (Hammer of the Year)	CD	40	2	7		8	1	August 1974	Academy
6	(England)	Alan Devonshire	LM	34	5	8	1	7		September 1976	Southall & Ealing Borough
7	(England)	Paul Allen	RM	31	2	7 (1)	1	7		1979	Academy
8	(England)	Stuart Pearson	F	24(1)	5	8	2	3	1	August 1979	Manchester United
9	(England)	David Cross	CF	38(1)	12	5	1	9	5	December 1977	West Bromwich Albion
10	(England)	Trevor Brooking	CM	36	3	8	1	3	1	July 1965	Academy
11	(England)	Geoff Pike	CM	27(4)	5	7 (1)	1	6	1	July 1973	Academy
Important Players
3	(England)	Paul Brush	LB	27		6		4		1977	Academy
11	(England)	Jimmy Neighbour	W	22(1)	1	4				September 1979	Norwich City
6	(England)	Pat Holland	M	21(5)	4	1		8	1	April 1969	Academy
Other Players
8	(England)	Billy Lansdowne	F	5 (3)	1			4 (1)	3	1978	Academy
11	(England)	Nicky Morgan	F	4 (2)	1			1		1978	Academy
8	(England)	Dale Banton	F	2 (2)				1		1979	Academy
1	(Scotland)	Bobby Ferguson	GK	2				1		1967	Kilmarnock
3	(England)	Mark Smith	LB	1				1		1979	Academy
