= 1980–81 West Ham United F.C. season =

English football team season

West Ham United
1980–81 season
- Chairman: Len Cearns
- Manager: John Lyall
- Stadium: Boleyn Ground
- Second Division: 1st
- FA Cup: Third round
- League Cup: Final
- European Cup Winners' Cup: Quarter-finals
- Top goalscorer: League: David Cross (22); All: Cross (33)
- Highest home attendance: 36,551 (v Coventry City F.C, League cup Semi final 2nd leg 10 February 1981)
- Lowest home attendance: 0 (v Castilla, 1 October 1980)
- Average home league attendance: 27,140
Home colours

In one of the most notable seasons in the club's history, West Ham United won the Second Division in the 1980–81 season to return to the top flight of English football after an absence of three years.

== Season summary ==
West Ham lost just four League matches all season, were unbeaten in the League after Boxing Day, and finished 13 points clear of second-placed Notts County, accumulating a record points total for the Second Division.

The Hammers also reached the League Cup final for the second time, after a run in which they knocked out First Division Tottenham Hotspur and Coventry City. In the final, they forced a replay against Liverpool after Ray Stewart scored an equalising penalty in the last minute of extra-time, but lost 2–1 at Villa Park.

West Ham failed to retain the FA Cup, which they had won the previous season, when they lost to Wrexham in a second replay in the third round. However, they reached the quarter-finals of the European Cup Winners' Cup in a run that included a 5–1 victory over Real Madrid's reserve side Castilla played behind closed doors because of crowd trouble. They were eliminated 4–2 on aggregate by the eventual winners, Dinamo Tbilisi.

== League table ==
Pos	Team	Pld	W	D	L	GF	GA	GD	Pts	Qualification or relegation
1	West Ham United (C, P)	42	28	10	4	79	29	+50	66	Promotion to the First Division
2	Notts County (P)	42	18	17	7	49	38	+11	53	Promotion to the First Division
3	Swansea City (P)	42	18	14	10	64	44	+20	50	Cup Winners' Cup first round and promotion to the First Division
4	Blackburn Rovers	42	16	18	8	42	29	+13	50	
5	Luton Town	42	18	12	12	61	46	+15	48	

Rules for classification: 1) Points; 2) Goal difference; 3) Goals scored
(C) Champions; (P) Promoted

== Results ==
West Ham United's score comes first

=== Football League Second Division ===
Date	Opponent	Venue	Result	Attendance	Goalscorers
16 August 1980	Luton Town	H	1–2	27,933	Stewart (pen)
19 August 1980	Bristol City	A	1–1	13,554	Cross
23 August 1980	Preston North End	A	0–0	9,063	
30 August 1980	Notts County	H	4–0	21,769	Cross, Goddard (2), Stewart (pen)
6 September 1980	Chelsea	A	1–0	32,669	Wilkins (o.g.)
13 September 1980	Shrewsbury Town	H	3–0	22,339	King (o.g.), Goddard, Cross
20 September 1980	Watford	H	3–2	24,288	Cross, Barnes, Brooking
27 September 1980	Cambridge United	A	2–1	8,591	Goddard, Cross
4 October 1980	Newcastle United	A	0–0	24,848	
7 October 1980	Cardiff City	H	1–0	20,402	Neighbour
11 October 1980	Blackburn Rovers	H	2–0	32,402	Cross (2)
18 October 1980	Oldham Athletic	A	0–0	8,344	
25 October 1980	Bolton Wanderers	H	2–1	25,257	Walsh (o.g.), Pike
1 November 1980	Bristol Rovers	A	1–0	6,328	Goddard
8 November 1980	Grimsby Town	H	2–1	25,468	Cross (2)
11 November 1980	Bristol City	H	5–0	25,210	Goddard (2), Martin, Brooking, Cross
15 November 1980	Luton Town	A	2–3	17,031	Brooking (2)
22 November 1980	Swansea City	H	2–0	25,210	Cross, Goddard
26 November 1980	Derby County	A	0–2	18,446	
29 November 1980	Wrexham	A	2–2	8,941	Devonshire, Goddard
6 December 1980	Sheffield Wednesday	H	2–1	30,746	Brooking, Holland
13 December 1980	Blackburn Rovers	A	0–0	13,279	
20 December 1980	Derby County	H	3–1	24,071	Cross, Goddard, Brooking
26 December 1980	Queens Park Rangers	A	0–3	23,811	
27 December 1980	Orient	H	2–1	34,408	Holland, Allen
1 January 1981	Swansea City	A	3–1	34,408	Brooking, Pike, Cross
17 January 1981	Notts County	A	1–1	13,718	Holland
31 January 1981	Preston North End	H	5–0	26,413	Goddard, Pike, Lampard, Devonshire (2)
7 February 1981	Shrewsbury Town	A	2–0	9,201	Devonshire, Cross
14 February 1981	Chelsea	H	4–0	35,164	Brooking (2), Cross, Devonshire
21 February 1981	Cambridge United	H	4–2	36,002	Devonshire, Stewart (2; 1 pen), Goddard
28 February 1981	Watford	A	2–1	20,786	Cross (2)
7 March 1981	Newcastle United	H	1–0	26,274	Cross
21 March 1981	Oldham Athletic	H	1–1	24,394	Goddard
28 March 1981	Bolton Wanderers	A	1–1	13,271	Brooking
4 April 1981	Bristol Rovers	H	2–0	23,544	Pike, Goddard
11 April 1981	Grimsby Town	A	5–1	17,924	Cross (4), Pike
18 April 1981	Orient	A	2–0	14,592	Neighbour, Pike
21 April 1981	Queens Park Rangers	H	3–0	24,599	Goddard (3)
2 May 1981	Wrexham	H	1–0	30,515	Stewart (pen)
6 May 1981	Cardiff City	A	0–0	10,558	
8 May 1981	Sheffield Wednesday	A	1–0	21,087	Morgan

=== FA Cup ===
Round	Date	Opponent	Venue	Result	Attendance	Goalscorers
R3	3 January 1981	Wrexham	H	1–1	30,137	Stewart (pen)
R3 replay	6 January 1981	Wrexham	A	0–0 (aet)	13,643	
R3 2nd replay	19 January 1981	Wrexham	A	0–1 (aet)	14,615	

=== League Cup ===
Round	Date	Opponent	Venue	Result	Attendance	Goalscorers
R2 1st leg	26 August 1980	Burnley	A	2–0	6,818	Goddard, Cross
R2 2nd leg	2 September 1980	Burnley	H	4–0 (6–0 on agg)	15,216	Stewart (pen), Goddard, Wood (o.g.), Pike
R3	23 September 1980	Charlton Athletic	A	2–1	17,884	Cross (2)
R4	28 October 1980	Barnsley	H	2–1	21,548	Martin, Cross
QF	2 December 1980	Tottenham Hotspur	H	1–0	26,003	Cross
SF 1st leg	27 January 1981	Coventry City	A	2–3	35,468	Bonds, Thompson (o.g.)
SF 2nd leg	10 February 1981	Coventry City	H	2–0 (4–3 on agg)	36,551	Goddard, Neighbour
F	14 March 1981	Liverpool	N	1–1 (aet)	100,000	Stewart (pen) 120'
F replay	1 April 1981	Liverpool	N	1–2	26,693	Goddard 5'

=== European Cup Winners' Cup ===
Round	Date	Opponent	Venue	Result	Attendance	Goalscorers
R1 1st leg	17 September 1980	Castilla	A	1–3	40,000	Cross
R1 2nd leg	1 October 1980	Castilla	H	5–1 (aet; 6–4 on agg)	0	Pike, Cross (3), Goddard, Bernal
R2 1st leg	22 October 1980	Poli Timișoara	H	4–0	27,257	Bonds, Goddard, Stewart (pen), Cross
R2 2nd leg	5 November 1980	Poli Timișoara	A	0–1 (4–1 on agg)	25,000	Păltinișanu
R3 1st leg	4 March 1981	Dinamo Tbilisi	H	1–4	34,957	Cross
R3 2nd leg	18 March 1981	Dinamo Tbilisi	A	1–0 (2–4 on agg)	80,000	Pearson

=== Charity Shield ===
Date	Opponent	Result	Attendance	Goalscorers
9 August 1980	Liverpool	0–1	90,000	McDermott

== Squad ==
No.		Player	Pos.	Eur Apps	Eur Gls	Lge Apps	Lge Gls	FAC Apps	FAC Gls	LC Apps	LC Gls	CS Apps	Date signed	Previous club
West Ham United 1980-81 First XI
1	(England)	Phil Parkes (Hammer of the Year)	GK	6		42		3		9		1	1979	Q.P.R.
2	(Scotland)	Ray Stewart	RB	6	1	41	5	3	1	9	2	1	August 1979	Dundee United
3	(England)	Frank Lampard	LB	6		38(1)	1	2		8			1964	Academy
4	(England)	Billy Bonds (Captain)	CD	6	1	41		3		8	1	1	May 1967	Charlton Athletic
5	(England)	Alvin Martin	CD	6		41	1	3		9	1	1	August 1974	Academy
6	(England)	Alan Devonshire	LM	4		39	6	3		9		1	September 1976	Southall
7	(England)	Pat Holland	RM	3		25	3	2		4		1	April 1969	Academy
8	(England)	Paul Goddard	CF	6	2	37	17	3		9	4		1980	Q.P.R.
9	(England)	David Cross	CF	6	5	41	22	3		9	5	1	December 1977	West Brom
10	(England)	Trevor Brooking	CM	4 (1)		36	10	3		7		1	July 1965	Academy
11	(England)	Geoff Pike	CM	6	1	42	6	3		9	1	1	July 1973	Academy
Important Players
7	(England)	Jimmy Neighbour	W	4		22(2)	2	0 (1)		4	1		September 1979	Norwich City
3	(England)	Paul Brush	LB	1 (3)		8 (3)		1		3		1	1977	Academy
Other Players
11	(England)	Nicky Morgan	F	1 (2)		5 (1)	1			1		0 (1)	1978	Academy
7	(England)	Paul Allen	RM	1 (1)		1 (2)	1	1		1 (2)		1	1979	Academy
12	(England)	Stuart Pearson	F	0 (1)	1	2 (3)				0 (2)			August 1979	Manchester United
12	(England)	Bobby Barnes	F	0 (1)		1 (5)	1			1			1980	Academy

== See also ==
- West Ham United F.C. by season
