= 1981 Football League Cup final =

- Event: 1980–81 Football League Cup
Liverpool	West Ham United
- Liverpool won after a replay
Liverpool	West Ham United
1	1
- After extra time
- Date: 14 March 1981
- Venue: Wembley Stadium, London
- Referee: Clive Thomas (Treorchy)
- Attendance: 100,000

Replay
Liverpool	West Ham United
2	1
- Date: 1 April 1981
- Venue: Villa Park, Birmingham
- Referee: Clive Thomas (Treorchy)
- Attendance: 36,693

The 1981 Football League Cup final was a football match between Liverpool and West Ham United on 14 March 1981 at Wembley Stadium, London. It was the final match of the 1980–81 Football League Cup, the 21st staging of the Football League Cup, a competition for the 92 teams in The Football League. Both teams were appearing in their second final, and had both lost their first finals in 1966 and 1978 respectively.

Both teams entered the competition in the second round. Liverpool's matches were generally comfortable victories, with the exception of the semi-final against Manchester City, which they won 2–1 over two-legs. West Ham's matches were generally close affairs, they only won by more two goals once, when they beat Burnley 6–0 over two-legs in the second round.

Watched by a crowd of 100,000, the first 90 minutes was goalless and the final went to extra time. Liverpool opened the scoring in the 118th minute, when defender Alan Kennedy scored. The goal was hotly contested as the shot passed over Sammy Lee of Liverpool in an offside position, obstructing the view of the West Ham goalkeeper, Phil Parkes. Referee Clive Thomas controversially allowed the goal to stand, his opinion being that Lee was not interfering with play. After the game, the usually placid West Ham manager, John Lyall, uncharacteristically expressed his anger to Thomas and said he "felt cheated". This was later misrepresented by Thomas as Lyall saying that "Thomas had cheated". The Liverpool lead lasted two minutes, as West Ham equalised courtesy of a Ray Stewart penalty, after a Liverpool handball on the line blocked a goal bound header from Alvin Martin. With the final score 1–1, the match was replayed on 1 April, at Villa Park, Birmingham. West Ham went ahead in the opening minutes, when Paul Goddard scored. However, their lead was short-lived as goals from Kenny Dalglish and Alan Hansen gave Liverpool the lead. No further goals were scored in the second half and Liverpool won the final 2–1 to win the competition for the first time.

== Route to the final ==
=== Liverpool ===
Liverpool started slowly and lost the first leg of their 2nd-round game with Bradford City, before scoring four goals in the return leg at Anfield. They then scored a total of 12 goals in home ties against Swindon Town, Portsmouth and Birmingham City. In the semi-final they won their first leg at Manchester City, before a home draw allowed them to reach their second League Cup final.

=== West Ham United ===
West Ham United played three Third Division sides in Burnley, Charlton Athletic and Barnsley to reach the quarter-final. Here, they beat First Division Tottenham Hotspur 1–0. In the semi-final; they recovered from losing the first leg to Coventry City to win the tie 4–3 on aggregate.

== Match ==
=== Details ===
14 March 1981
15:00 GMT

Liverpool	1–1 (a.e.t.)	West Ham United
A Kennedy 118'		Stewart 120' (pen.)

Wembley Stadium, London
Attendance: 100,000
Referee: Clive Thomas

Liverpool	West Ham United

1	(England) Ray Clemence
2	(England) Phil Neal
3	(England) Alan Kennedy
4	(England) Colin Irwin
5	(England) Ray Kennedy (c)
6	(Scotland) Alan Hansen
7	(Scotland) Kenny Dalglish
8	(England) Sammy Lee
9	(Republic of Ireland) Steve Heighway	Substituted off
10	(England) Terry McDermott
11	(Scotland) Graeme Souness
Substitute:
12	(England) Jimmy Case	Substituted on
Manager:
(England) Bob Paisley

1	(England) Phil Parkes
2	(Scotland) Ray Stewart
3	(England) Frank Lampard, Sr.
4	(England) Billy Bonds (c)
5	(England) Alvin Martin
6	(England) Alan Devonshire
7	(England) Jimmy Neighbour
8	(England) Paul Goddard	Substituted off
9	(England) David Cross
10	(England) Trevor Brooking
11	(England) Geoff Pike
Substitute:
12	(England) Stuart Pearson	Substituted on
Manager:
(England) John Lyall

== Replay ==
=== Details ===
1 April 1981
19:30 BST

Liverpool	2–1	West Ham United
Dalglish 25'; Hansen 28'		Goddard 10'

Villa Park, Birmingham
Attendance: 36,693
Referee: Clive Thomas

Liverpool	West Ham United

1	(England) Ray Clemence
2	(England) Phil Neal
3	(England) Alan Kennedy
4	(England) Phil Thompson (c)
5	(England) Ray Kennedy
6	(Scotland) Alan Hansen
7	(Scotland) Kenny Dalglish
8	(England) Sammy Lee
9	(Wales) Ian Rush
10	(England) Terry McDermott
11	(England) Jimmy Case
Substitute:
12	(England) Colin Irwin
Manager:
(England) Bob Paisley

1	(England) Phil Parkes
2	(Scotland) Ray Stewart
3	(England) Frank Lampard, Sr.
4	(England) Billy Bonds (c)
5	(England) Alvin Martin
6	(England) Alan Devonshire
7	(England) Jimmy Neighbour
8	(England) Paul Goddard
9	(England) David Cross
10	(England) Trevor Brooking
11	(England) Geoff Pike
Substitute:
12	(England) Stuart Pearson
Manager:
(England) John Lyall
