= Alan Devonshire =

England international footballer

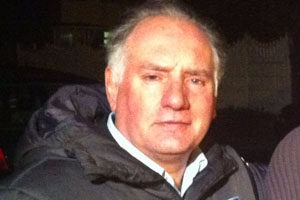
- Devonshire in 2011

Personal information
- Full name: Alan Ernest Devonshire
- Date of birth: 13 April 1956 (age 70)
- Place of birth: Park Royal, England
- Height: 5 ft 11 in (1.80 m)
- Position: Midfielder

Youth career
- Crystal Palace

Senior career*
Years	Team	Apps	(Gls)
–1976	Southall		
1976–1990	West Ham United	358	(29)
1990–1992	Watford	25	(1)
Total		383+	(30+)

International career
1980	England B	1	(0)
1980–1983	England	8	(0)

Managerial career
- 1995: Osterley
- 1995–1996: Brentford Women
- 1996–2003: Maidenhead United
- 2003–2011: Hampton & Richmond Borough
- 2011–2015: Braintree Town
- 2015–2025: Maidenhead United
- * Club domestic league appearances and goals

Alan Ernest Devonshire (born 13 April 1956) is an English former professional footballer who was most recently the manager of Maidenhead United. He was a wide midfielder who played for West Ham United, with whom he won the FA Cup in 1980, and Watford, where he finished his career in 1992. Devonshire won eight caps for England between 1980 and 1983. He subsequently became manager of Maidenhead United (two spells), Hampton & Richmond Borough and Braintree Town.

== Playing career ==
=== Early career ===
Born in Park Royal, then a part of Middlesex, Crystal Palace rejected Devonshire at age 14 for being too small. He returned to Selhurst Park two years later, playing a couple of youth team games before again being released, this time by former West Ham player and Palace manager, Malcolm Allison. Devonshire started playing for non-league Southall and caught the attention of League clubs such as Reading, Southampton, and Brentford. By day, he worked as a forklift truck driver at the Hoover Factory in Perivale, Middlesex. During this period, two West Ham United scouts, Eddie Baily and Charlie Faulkner, spotted him playing for Southall and recommended him to Ron Greenwood. Devonshire signed for West Ham United in 1976 for a fee of £5,000; "West Ham's best ever buy", according to some.

=== West Ham United ===
Devonshire debuted for West Ham on 27 October 1976 in a League Cup tie against Queens Park Rangers, which West Ham lost 2–0. He made his League debut three days later, on 30 October 1976, against West Bromwich Albion, where he played in a 3–0 defeat. He soon became a fan favourite, referred to by his nickname "Dev". His down-to-earth attitude was one to which the fans could relate. He also enhanced his rapport with supporters by travelling to home games on the London Underground from his West London home.

He played 29 games in all competitions without scoring in his first season. 1976–77 was a poor season for West Ham, finishing 17th and only two points clear of relegation in the First Division. The following season, 1977–78, saw Devonshire's first goals for the club in a 3–3 at Upton Park on 12 November 1977. It also saw him play 38 games in all competitions, scoring three goals. Unfortunately for West Ham, his efforts could not prevent relegation to the Second Division after they finished in 20th place. The 1978–79 season saw West Ham rebuilding their side following relegation. Devonshire was a regular in the team that finished 5th in the Second Division. He played 41 out of a possible 42 league games and won the Hammer of the Season award. West Ham failed to gain promotion again in the 1979–80 season. However, they did get to the 1980 FA Cup Final, where Devonshire collected an FA Cup winner's medal as West Ham beat the favourites, holders, and Cup Winners Cup finalists Arsenal 1–0 at Wembley with a Trevor Brooking header from a Devonshire cross. Devonshire had scored in the semi-final replay at Elland Road in a 2–1 win against Everton.

Devonshire's career flourished in the 1980–81 season. His partnership with Trevor Brooking formed the cornerstone of West Ham's push for promotion back to the First Division. He also played in European football for the first time and was a member of the side which reached the 1981 League Cup Final. He collected a Second Division title medal as they won promotion, losing only four games. Devonshire continued to be a regular member of the West Ham side in the First Division until 7 January 1984. Playing against Wigan Athletic in the FA Cup, he snapped three ligaments in his right knee. He tried to make a comeback in March 1985 in two cup games against Wimbledon but again broke down. It was 19 months from his first injury to his return to full fitness against Birmingham City on 17 August 1985. His long absence resulted in him losing some of his speed but still maintaining his ability to pass the ball well. He made the final pass for several goals scored by teammates Tony Cottee and Frank McAvennie in the 1985–86 season as West Ham finished third in the First Division.

Injury struck Devonshire again in the first game of the 1987–88 season. He snapped his Achilles tendon fifteen minutes into a match against Queens Park Rangers. That forced him out of the game for over a year, and by the time of his return, the West Ham team were in decline. The 1988–89 season saw him play only 20 league games without scoring as the Hammers were relegated to the Second Division. For the 1989–90 season, Lou Macari replaced John Lyall, and the side went through another rebuild. Devonshire made only seven league appearances that season. Billy Bonds replaced Macari, and Devonshire's former teammate granted him a free transfer in May 1990. Devonshire's last appearance for West Ham came on 14 February 1990 when he appeared as a substitute for Gary Strodder in a 6–0 away defeat to Oldham Athletic in a League Cup semi-final. His performance, and that of other experienced West Ham players Liam Brady, Phil Parkes, Alvin Martin and Julian Dicks, was described as "embarrassingly helpless" in a game known as the "St. Valentine's Day massacre". Devonshire had played 448 competitive games over 14 years, scoring 32 goals.

=== Watford ===
Devonshire signed for Watford in 1990. He played for two more years before dropping out of league football. He went on to serve the non-league club Chippenham Sports as a player-coach.

== International career ==
Devonshire was selected to play for England by Ron Greenwood, his former manager at West Ham. He debuted on 20 May 1980 in a 1–1 draw against Northern Ireland. Greenwood selected him again on 31 May 1980 in a friendly game against Australia, which England won 2–1. Unfortunately for Devonshire, his position and style of play were similar to those of Glenn Hoddle, and he often found himself playing second fiddle to the Tottenham man. He would have to wait two years for his next cap, on 25 May 1982, in a 2–0 win against the Netherlands. Another game followed on 2 June 1982, a 1–1 draw against Iceland. These games were warm-up matches for the 1982 World Cup, but Devonshire was missing from England's final squad for the tournament. Bobby Robson, England's new manager, attempting to rebuild an ageing team, selected Devonshire in October 1982. The game against West Germany finished in a 2–1 defeat. His final two appearances, against Greece and Luxembourg, came towards the end of 1983. These were qualifiers for the 1984 UEFA European Football Championship and Devonshire's only appearances in competitive international games.

== Managerial career ==
Devonshire began his management career in charge of Brentford Women and the non-league club Osterley. He was appointed joint manager of Maidenhead United in the summer of 1996 alongside Martyn Busby, taking sole charge in March 1997. Under Devonshire, the Magpies ended a 27-year trophy drought by winning the Isthmian League Full Members Cup in 1996–97 and earned a historic promotion to the Isthmian League Premier Division after a third-place finish in 1999–00. The club also won four Berks & Bucks Senior Cups (1997–98, 1998–99, 2001–02, 2002–03). After the Chairman, Roger Coombs, announced his decision to step down at the end of the 2002–03 season, Devonshire followed suit. He then became the manager of Hampton & Richmond Borough in the Conference South, taking the Maidenhead first team squad with him, bar four – Ryan Ashe, Brian Connor, Adam Durrant and Lawrence Yaku – who stayed at York Road, and three – Richard Barnard, Andy Cook and Matty Glynn – who signed for Aldershot Town, Hendon and St Albans City respectively. Devonshire was inducted into the Maidenhead United Hall of Fame, alongside Connor, in January 2010.

As manager of Hampton & Richmond, he took the club from Isthmian League Division One South to the play-off-final of the Conference South. He guided them to fifth place in the Isthmian Division One South in his first season. The re-organisation of the non-league pyramid was enough to see the club promoted to the Isthmian League Premier Division. He then guided the club to a sixth-placed finish in their debut season at that level, missing out on the play-offs on goal difference on the final day. The 2005–06 season would see Devonshire take the team into the play-offs: having won a dramatic play-off semi-final on penalties away to Heybridge Swifts, the team lost 3–0 at Fisher Athletic. Devonshire finally got Hampton & Richmond Borough promoted in style the following season, bringing the 2006–07 Isthmian Premier Division title to the Beveree. In their debut season in the Conference South, he guided his team to third place in the league and into the play-offs for the Conference National.

On 23 May 2011, Devonshire became manager of the newly promoted Conference National club Braintree Town. During his four-season spell at Cressing Road, Devonshire led the Iron to finishes of 12th, 9th, 6th, and 14th. Having declined a new contract, Devonshire left the club on 17 April 2015.

Devonshire's second spell as Maidenhead United manager began in May 2015. On his return to United, his team brought Port Vale back to York Road for an FA Cup 1st Round replay in November 2015 after an unforgettable draw at Vale Park. A final league position of 7th in 2015–16 served notice of a tilt at promotion. After first topping the table in August, the Magpies held on to beat the challenge of Ebbsfleet United to win the 2016–17 title on the final day of the season, with Devonshire securing the National League South Manager of the Season award in the process. Maidenhead also won the Berks & Bucks Senior Cup in 2017 after beating Hungerford Town in the final at Slough. Devonshire then led the Magpies to a top-half finish in their inaugural National League season, winning the Manager of the Month award in April 2018. In June 2021, Devonshire signed a new three-year contract until the end of the 2023–24 season, which was a reward for keeping the part-time club safe from relegation at the top level of non-league football. The occasional scalps of big ex-league teams (particularly at York Road) have resulted in the use of the phrase "You've been Devonshired". His 800th game in sole charge of Maidenhead United came at Aldershot Town on 31 August 2024. Devonshire confirmed his intent to resign on 23 November 2025, managing the team to wins in their next two games before leaving the club six days later.

== Personal life ==
Devonshire's father, Les, was a professional footballer with clubs including Chester City and Crystal Palace.

He has a race horse named after him.

== Career statistics ==
Appearances and goals by club, season and competition
Club	Season	League			National cup		League cup		Europe		Other		Total	
Club	Season	Division	Apps	Goals	Apps	Goals	Apps	Goals	Apps	Goals	Apps	Goals	Apps	Goals
West Ham United	1976–77	First Division	27	0	0	0	1	0	—		—		27	0
West Ham United	1977–78	First Division	32	3	3	0	1	0	—		—		36	3
West Ham United	1978–79	Second Division	41	5	1	0	1	0	—		—		43	5
West Ham United	1979–80	Second Division	34	5	8	1	7	0	—		—		49	6
West Ham United	1980–81	Second Division	39	6	3	0	9	0	4 (Note: Appearances in UEFA Cup Winners' Cup)	0	1 (Note: Appearance in FA Charity Shield)	0	56	6
West Ham United	1981–82	First Division	35	1	1	0	5	0	—		—		41	1
West Ham United	1982–83	First Division	39	3	1	0	6	0	—		—		46	3
West Ham United	1983–84	First Division	22	1	1	0	4	2	—		—		27	3
West Ham United	1984–85	First Division	0	0	2	0	0	0	—		—		2	0
West Ham United	1985–86	First Division	38	3	6	0	3	0	—		—		47	3
West Ham United	1986–87	First Division	20	2	3	0	4	0	—		—		27	2
West Ham United	1987–88	First Division	1	0	0	0	0	0	—		—		1	0
West Ham United	1988–89	First Division	14	0	7	0	4	0	—		—		25	0
West Ham United	1989–90	Second Division	3	0	0	0	0	0	—		1 (Note: Appearance in Full Members' Cup)	0	4	0
West Ham United	Total		358	29	36	1	48	2	4	0	2	0	448	32
Watford	1990–91	Second Division	24	1	1	0	1	0	—		0	0	26	1
Watford	1991–92	Second Division	1	0	0	0	0	0	—		0	0	1	0
Watford	Total		25	1	1	0	1	0	0	0	0	0	27	1
Career total			383	30	37	1	49	2	4	0	2	0	459	33

== Managerial statistics ==
As of match played 29 November 2025

Team	From	To	Record				
Team	From	To	G	W	D	L	Win %
Maidenhead United	1 July 1996	30 June 2003	330	132	74	124	40.0
Hampton & Richmond Borough	1 July 2003	23 May 2011	388	181	93	114	46.6
Braintree Town	23 May 2011	17 April 2015	200	81	40	79	40.5
Maidenhead United	5 May 2015	29 November 2025	539	219	115	205	40.6
Total			1,457	613	322	522	42.1

== Honours ==
=== Player ===
West Ham United

- Football League Second Division: 1980–81
- FA Cup: 1979–80
- Football League Cup runner-up: 1980–81

=== Manager ===
Maidenhead United

- National League South: 2016–17

== See also ==
- List of football managers with the most matches
