= Paul Allen (footballer) =

English footballer (born 1962)

Personal information
- Full name: Paul Kevin Allen
- Date of birth: 28 August 1962 (age 64)
- Place of birth: Aveley, England
- Height: 5 ft 7 in (1.70 m)
- Position: Midfielder

Youth career
- West Ham United

Senior career*
Years	Team	Apps	(Gls)
1979–1985	West Ham United	152	(6)
1985–1993	Tottenham Hotspur	292	(23)
1993–1995	Southampton	43	(1)
1994	→ Luton Town (loan)	4	(0)
1995	→ Stoke City (loan)	17	(1)
1995–1997	Swindon Town	36	(1)
1997	Bristol City	15	(0)
1997–1998	Millwall	28	(0)
- Purfleet
Total		587	(32)

International career
1979–1980	England Youth	22	(3)
1981	England U20	5	(0)
1985	England U21	3	(0)
- * Club domestic league appearances and goals

Paul Kevin Allen (born 28 August 1962) is an English former professional footballer and delegate liaison officer for the Professional Footballers' Association.

As a player, he was a midfielder who notably played top flight football for West Ham United, Tottenham Hotspur and Southampton, with appearance for Spurs and the Saints in the Premier League. He also played in the Football League for Luton Town, Stoke City, Swindon Town, Bristol City and Millwall. He won three caps for England at under-21 level.

== Career ==
At 17 years and 256 days old, Allen's appearance for West Ham United against Arsenal in the 1980 FA Cup Final made him the youngest player to appear in an FA Cup final at Wembley Stadium, though James Prinsep played at a younger age at Kennington Oval in 1879. Both records have since been broken. His debut for West Ham had come on 29 September 1979 when 32 days after his 17th birthday he had appeared for the club in their 2–1 home win over Burnley in the Second Division. He collected a Second Division title medal for the Hammers in 1980–81 and helped re-establish them as a First Division side. He made 152 league appearances for the Hammers, scoring six goals, before a £400,000 fee took him to their London rivals Tottenham Hotspur on 19 June 1985.

He scored on his debut in an emphatic 4–0 win at White Hart Lane versus Watford. Allen went on to play in two FA Cup finals for Tottenham Hotspur, on the losing side in 1987 alongside his cousin Clive Allen. However, Allen was victorious in the 1991 FA Cup defeating Nottingham Forest 2–1. In eight years with Tottenham, he played 292 league games and scored 23 goals. He was voted player of the year for the 1992–93 season, his final full season at White Hart Lane.

He remained at White Hart Lane until 16 September 1993, when a £550,000 deal took him to Southampton. He played 33 FA Premier League games in 1993–94, scoring once, but played just ten league games without scoring in 1994–95 and was loaned out for 17 games to Stoke City, scoring once in a 4–2 defeat away at Southend United in March 1995. He then signed for Swindon Town on a free transfer and helped them win the Division Two title (and promotion to Division One) in 1995–96.

== Personal life ==
Allen comes from a family of footballers, his uncles are former Reading striker Dennis Allen and fellow Tottenham player Les Allen. His cousins are Martin Allen, Clive Allen and Bradley Allen.

After retiring from playing football at the end of the 1997–98, which he spent in Division One with Millwall, he now works for the Professional Footballers' Association (PFA) in their Player Services Department Professional Footballers' Association.

== Career statistics ==
Appearances and goals by club, season and competition
Club	Season	League			FA Cup		League Cup		Other (Note: Appearances and goals in the Anglo-Italian Cup, FA Charity Shield, Football League Trophy, Screen Sport Super Cup and UEFA Cup Winners Cup)		Total	
Club	Season	Division	Apps	Goals	Apps	Goals	Apps	Goals	Apps	Goals	Apps	Goals
West Ham United	1979–80	Second Division	31	2	8	1	7	0	0	0	46	3
West Ham United	1980–81	Second Division	3	1	1	0	3	0	3	0	10	1
West Ham United	1981–82	First Division	28	0	0	0	2	0	0	0	30	0
West Ham United	1982–83	First Division	33	0	1	0	7	2	0	0	41	2
West Ham United	1983–84	First Division	19	0	3	0	1	0	0	0	23	0
West Ham United	1984–85	First Division	38	3	5	2	4	0	0	0	47	5
West Ham United	Total		152	6	18	3	24	2	3	0	197	11
Tottenham Hotspur	1985–86	First Division	33	2	5	0	4	0	6	0	48	2
Tottenham Hotspur	1986–87	First Division	37	3	6	1	9	0	0	0	52	4
Tottenham Hotspur	1987–88	First Division	39	3	1	0	3	0	0	0	43	3
Tottenham Hotspur	1988–89	First Division	37	1	1	0	5	0	0	0	43	1
Tottenham Hotspur	1989–90	First Division	32	6	1	0	6	2	0	0	39	8
Tottenham Hotspur	1990–91	First Division	36	3	6	0	6	0	0	0	48	3
Tottenham Hotspur	1991–92	First Division	39	3	2	0	7	2	8	0	56	3
Tottenham Hotspur	1992–93	Premier League	38	3	5	0	4	0	0	0	47	3
Tottenham Hotspur	1993–94	Premier League	1	0	0	0	0	0	0	0	1	0
Tottenham Hotspur	Total		292	23	27	1	44	4	14	0	377	28
Southampton	1993–94	Premier League	32	1	2	0	2	0	0	0	36	1
Southampton	1994–95	Premier League	11	0	0	0	2	0	0	0	13	0
Southampton	Total		43	1	2	0	4	0	0	0	49	1
Luton Town (loan)	1994–95	First Division	4	0	0	0	0	0	0	0	4	0
Stoke City (loan)	1994–95	First Division	17	1	0	0	0	0	2	0	19	1
Swindon Town	1995–96	Second Division	27	0	5	1	0	0	1	0	33	1
Swindon Town	1996–97	First Division	10	1	0	0	2	0	0	0	12	1
Swindon Town	Total		37	1	5	1	2	0	1	0	45	2
Bristol City	1996–97	Second Division	14	0	0	0	0	0	3	0	17	0
Millwall	1997–98	Second Division	28	0	1	0	3	0	2	0	34	0
Career total			587	32	53	5	77	6	25	0	742	43

== Honours ==
West Ham United

- Football League Second Division: 1980–81
- FA Cup: 1979–80

Tottenham Hotspur

- FA Cup: 1990–91; runner-up: 1986–87
- FA Charity Shield: 1991 (shared)

Swindon Town

- Football League Second Division: 1995–96

Individual

- West Ham United Hammer of the Year: 1985
- Tottenham Hotspur Player of the Year: 1991
