= Barnebys =

Search engine

Barnebys is a search engine for art, antiques, and collectibles from over 3,000 auction houses and galleries globally. They offer a free-to-use database of realized prices dating back to the beginning of the 1970s and have provided over forty million sold lots.

== History ==
Barnebys was launched in the Autumn of 2011 by Christopher Barnekow and Pontus Silfverstolpe in Stockholm, Sweden. It has a presence in the United Kingdom, United States, France, Spain, Germany, and Hong Kong since 2013. It lists items from a range of auction houses including Sotheby's, Christie's, and Phillips.

Barnebys acquired ValueMyStuff, founded by Patrick van der Vorst in 2018.

== Reception ==
In May 2014, the Financial Times described Barnebys as one of the leading contenders in the auction world.
