= Clive Thomas (football) =

Welsh football referee (born 1936)

- Born: 27 June 1936 (age 90); Treorchy, Wales

Domestic
Years	League	Role
?–1984	The Football League	Referee

International
Years	League	Role
1971–1980	FIFA listed	Referee

Clive Thomas (born 27 June 1936) is a Welsh former football referee, who operated in the English Football League and for FIFA during his career. He came from Treorchy in the Rhondda Valley.

== Career ==
=== Early career ===
Thomas's original ambition was to be a professional footballer. He achieved a place on the ground staff at Norwich City, playing as an inside forward. However, an ankle injury forced him to give up playing. He was then persuaded to take up refereeing at the age of sixteen. He made rapid progress, reaching the Welsh League and in 1964 became a Football League linesman. Two years later, aged thirty, he became a Football League referee, one of the youngest referees of the time.

=== Professional career ===
In February 1973, Thomas became the first and only referee to send off Liverpool's Tommy Smith, who had a reputation as an aggressive player, although the red card was for speaking out of turn rather than foul play.

During a long and sometimes controversial career as a referee in the old English First Division, he was known as "The Book" due to his strict interpretation of the laws of the game. His biggest occasion in domestic football came in 1976 when he took charge of the FA Cup final between Southampton and Manchester United. Thomas later said that he thought the only goal of the game, which was scored by Bobby Stokes, was offside, but was behind play and had to rely upon the linesman who deemed Stokes to be onside.

Thomas was involved in another controversy when refereeing the semi-final of the FA Cup in 1977 between local rivals Liverpool and Everton. With the game locked at 2–2 in the closing stages, Thomas disallowed what appeared to be a winning goal from Everton's Bryan Hamilton for handball. Liverpool went on to win the replay. Many years later, Thomas confided to Emlyn Hughes, who had been captain of Liverpool in the game, that he'd probably got the decision wrong and had disallowed a legitimate goal. Coincidentally, Thomas had also refereed the replay of a semi-final of the FA Cup in 1975 in which he had disallowed efforts by the same player while playing for Ipswich Town against West Ham United, West Ham winning the tie.

Thomas refereed the 1981 Football League Cup final between Liverpool and West Ham United. West Ham manager John Lyall said "he felt cheated" after Thomas allowed a late goal from Alan Kennedy to stand, despite the prone Sammy Lee lying on the grass in an offside position and in a direct line of sight of the West Ham goalkeeper. Thomas declared that Lee was "not interfering with play". This incident occurred just two minutes before the end of extra time and looked likely to give Liverpool a 1–0 win, only for West Ham to equalise with a penalty in the final minute. Thomas also refereed the replay, which Liverpool won 2–1.

In the same season, he officiated an FA Cup semi-final between Tottenham Hotspur and Wolves and gave a late penalty to Wolves, which was scored by Willie Carr and took the game to a replay. Wolves manager John Barnwell later said it was a tactical move as the game neared its end for Wolves players to drive into the box with the ball and fall at the merest touch, in case Thomas was "in one of his moods".

Thomas retired as a referee in 1984.

=== International matches ===
Thomas officiated in both the 1974 and 1978 World Cups, and in the 1976 European Championship.

During the 1976 European Championships in Yugoslavia, Thomas was the referee of the semi-final between Czechoslovakia and the Netherlands. In the extra time of that match, he missed a rough foul by Antonín Panenka on Johan Cruyff, after which Zdenek Nehoda was able to counter and score to give Czechoslovakia the lead. Willem van Hanegem received a red card after the incident for dissent. In a 2008 documentary by the Dutch TV program Andere Tijden Sport, Thomas said that he had made a mistake by not noticing the foul. He apologised to Cruyff and to the Dutch national team.

At the 1978 World Cup in Argentina, he officiated the Round 1 match between Brazil and Sweden, in which he blew the whistle for full-time during a play from a corner kick, so that a potential late goal by Zico, which would have given Brazil a 2–1 win, could not be scored. He ruled that the match time had run out when the kick was taken, which could not be done since it was an attacking play in progress.

== Post-career ==
In 1984, he published his autobiography, By the Book.

In 2004, he was elected to the largely ceremonial position of High Sheriff of Mid Glamorgan for 2005. He lives in Porthcawl, Wales.
