= Mark Smith (footballer, born October 1961) =

English footballer (born October 1961)

Personal information
- Date of birth: 10 October 1961 (age 65)
- Place of birth: England
- Position: Full back

Senior career*
Years	Team	Apps	(Gls)
1979	West Ham United	1	(0)

International career
1979	England Youth	3	(0)
- * Club domestic league appearances and goals as of 11:30, 10 January 2010 (UTC)

Mark Smith (born 10 October 1961) is an English former footballer who played, as a full-back, for West Ham United.

== Career ==
Smith was a product of West Ham's youth system. He played for Newham, Essex and London Boys and was an England Youth trialist before signing for West Ham in October 1979. He captained the youth team before making his West Ham debut in October 1979 in a 5–1, League Cup victory against Southend United. He was to make only one further appearance for The Hammers in the 2–0 victory against Swansea City, before his career was ended by injury.
