= Stuart Pearson =

English football player and manager (born 1949)

Personal information
- Full name: Stuart James Pearson
- Date of birth: 21 June 1949 (age 77)
- Place of birth: Cottingham, England
- Position: Forward

Youth career
- 1966–1968: Hull City

Senior career*
Years	Team	Apps	(Gls)
1968–1974	Hull City	129	(44)
1974–1979	Manchester United	139	(55)
1979–1982	West Ham United	34	(6)
Total		302	(105)

International career
1976	England U23	1	(0)
1976–1978	England	15	(5)
- * Club domestic league appearances and goals

Stuart James Pearson (born 21 June 1949) is an English former professional footballer who played as a forward. He appeared in three FA Cup finals, two for Manchester United and one with West Ham United.

== Club career ==
=== Hull City ===
Pearson started his career with hometown club Hull City, whom he joined as an amateur while doing an apprenticeship as a telephone engineer. He scored 44 league goals for the Tigers after becoming a first team regular when record scorer Chris Chilton left in 1971.

An assistant manager to Terry Neill at the time was Tommy Docherty, who subsequently became manager of Manchester United and signed Pearson in May 1974 for £200,000, with reserve player Peter Fletcher moving to Hull as part of the deal.

=== Manchester United ===
Pearson was bought by Manchester United after they were relegated to the Second Division and was instrumental in getting the club promoted back to the First Division the next season by scoring 17 goals. Every time he scored a goal he would celebrate with a raised right fist. He was in the team that lost 1–0 to Southampton in the 1976 FA Cup Final. The next year Pearson helped Manchester United win the 1977 FA Cup Final against Liverpool, scoring the first of Manchester United's goals in their 2–1 win. He was sidelined for nearly all of the 1978–79 season due to a knee injury but made a full recovery before leaving Manchester United for West Ham United in August 1979.

=== West Ham United ===
He helped the Hammers win the 1980 FA Cup Final, with his cross-shot setting up Trevor Brooking for the only goal in a 1–0 win over Arsenal. During interviews after the game, Barry Davies described him as "a big occasion player" and suggested that but for his injuries he would have been England's finest striker.

Pearson retired from league football in 1982 due to a knee injury, but continued to play at a lower level, in South Africa and the NASL.

== International career ==
Pearson won 15 caps for England between 1976 and 1978, scoring five goals.

== Coaching career ==
After retiring as a player, Pearson moved into coaching, serving as coach of Stockport County in 1985–86 and manager of Northwich Victoria during the first half of 1986–87. He became assistant manager/coach at West Bromwich Albion in 1988 and acted as caretaker manager for six games in 1991 following Brian Talbot's departure. Pearson left Albion in 1992 and was assistant manager at Bradford City from 1992 to 1994. He has also been a pundit for MUTV. He moved to Spain in the mid-2000s.

== Career statistics ==
=== Club ===
Appearances and goals by club, season and competition
Club	Season	League			FA Cup		League Cup		Europe		Other		Total	
Club	Season	Division	Apps	Goals	Apps	Goals	Apps	Goals	Apps	Goals	Apps	Goals	Apps	Goals
Hull City	1969–70	Second Division	1	0	0	0	0	0	—		—		1	0
Hull City	1970–71	Second Division	12	1	0	0	0	0	—		1 (Note: Appearance(s) in Watney Cup)	0	13	1
Hull City	1971–72	Second Division	38	15	2	0	1	0	—		—		41	15
Hull City	1972–73	Second Division	37	17	4	0	1	0	—		3 (Note: Appearance(s) in Anglo-Italian Cup)	0	45	17
Hull City	1973–74	Second Division	41	11	1	0	5	1	—		3	0	50	12
Hull City	Total		129	44	7	0	7	1	—		7	0	150	45
Manchester United	1974–75	Second Division	31	17	2	0	4	1	—		—		37	18
Manchester United	1975–76	First Division	39	13	7	1	3	0	—		—		49	14
Manchester United	1976–77	First Division	39	15	7	1	4	3	3 (Note: Appearance(s) in UEFA Cup)	0	—		53	19
Manchester United	1977–78	First Division	30	10	4	3	1	1	3 (Note: Appearance(s) in European Cup Winners' Cup)	1	1 (Note: Appearance(s) in FA Charity Shield)	0	39	15
Manchester United	1978–79	First Division	0	0	2	0	0	0	—		—		2	0
Manchester United	Total		139	55	22	5	12	5	6	1	1	0	180	66
West Ham United	1979–80	Second Division	25	5	8	2	3	1	—		—		36	8
West Ham United	1980–81	Second Division	5	0	0	0	2	0	1	1	—		8	1
West Ham United	1981–82	First Division	4	1	2	0	0	0	—		—		6	1
West Ham United	Total		34	6	10	2	5	1	1	1	—		50	10
Career total			302	105	39	7	24	7	7	2	8	0	380	121

=== International ===
Appearances and goals by national team and year
National team	Year	Apps	Goals
England	1976	6	3
England	1977	7	1
England	1978	2	1
Total		15	5

Scores and results list England's goal tally first, score column indicates score after each Pearson goal.

List of international goals scored by Stuart Pearson
No.	Date	Venue	Opponent	Score	Result	Competition	Ref.
1	11 May 1976	Wembley Stadium, London, England	Northern Ireland	3–0	4–0	1975–76 British Home Championship	
2	13 June 1976	Helsinki Olympic Stadium, Helsinki, Finland	Finland	1–0	4–1	1978 FIFA World Cup qualification	
3	8 September 1976	Wembley Stadium, London, England	Republic of Ireland	1–0	1–1	Friendly	
4	12 June 1977	Boca Juniors Stadium, Buenos Aires, Argentina	Argentina	1–0	1–1	Friendly	
5	22 February 1978	Olympiastadion, Munich, Germany	West Germany	1–0	1–2	Friendly	

== Honours ==
Hull City

- Watney Cup runner-up: 1973

Manchester United

- Football League Second Division: 1974–75
- FA Cup: 1976–77; runner-up: 1975–76
- FA Charity Shield: 1977

West Ham United

- FA Cup: 1979–80
- Football League Cup runner-up: 1980–81
