= Dale Banton =

English footballer

Personal information
- Full name: Dale Conrad Banton
- Date of birth: 15 May 1961 (age 65)
- Place of birth: Kensington, England
- Height: 5 ft 8 in (1.73 m)
- Position: Striker

Youth career
- West Ham United

Senior career*
Years	Team	Apps	(Gls)
1979–1982	West Ham United	5	(0)
1982–1984	Aldershot	106	(47)
1984–1988	York City	138	(49)
1988–1989	Walsall	10	(0)
1989	Grimsby Town	8	(1)
1989–1990	Aldershot	44	(3)
1990–?	Goole Town	4	(15)
- * Club domestic league appearances and goals

Dale Conrad Banton (born 15 May 1961) is an English former footballer who played as a striker.

== Career ==
Born in Kensington, London, grow up in Wembley attending Alperton High School, then going on to play for West Ham United, Aldershot (scoring 47 goals in 106 appearances) and York City before finishing his career with Goole Town. He won the York City Clubman of the Year Award for the 1987–88 season.
