= Paul Goddard (footballer) =

English footballer and manager

Personal information
- Date of birth: 12 October 1959 (age 67)
- Place of birth: Harlington, Middlesex, England
- Height: 1.76 m (5 ft 9 1/2 in)
- Position: Striker

Senior career*
Years	Team	Apps	(Gls)
1977–1980	Queens Park Rangers	70	(23)
1980–1986	West Ham United	170	(54)
1986–1988	Newcastle United	61	(19)
1988–1989	Derby County	49	(15)
1989–1991	Millwall	20	(1)
1991–1994	Ipswich Town	72	(13)
Total		442	(125)

International career
1980–1982	England U21	8	(5)
1982	England	1	(1)
1984	England B	1	(0)

Managerial career
- 1994: Ipswich Town (caretaker)
- * Club domestic league appearances and goals

Paul Goddard (born 12 October 1959 in Harlington, Middlesex, England) is an English former professional footballer and manager. During his career he played for Queens Park Rangers, West Ham United, Newcastle United, Derby County, Millwall and Ipswich Town. He also played a single game for England scoring one goal. During the 1994–95 season he was caretaker manager of Ipswich Town.

== Club career ==
A Queens Park Rangers youth product, Goddard made his senior debut in 1977 and spent three season as a striker for the R's. He scored 23 goals in 75 First Team appearances between 1978 and 1980.

Sold by Tommy Docherty/Jim Gregory in August 1980 Goddard became West Ham's record signing when he moved to Upton Park for £800,000. He was West Ham's top scorer in the 1982–83 season, and scored 71 goals in 213 League and Cup matches for the club. One of these goals was in the replay of the 1981 Football League Cup final 2–1 defeat to Liverpool at Villa Park.

At the start of the 1985–86 season he partnered Tony Cottee in the West Ham front line, but injury ruled him out after one game. This led to Cottee being partnered by Frank McAvennie, and the McAvennie-Cottee partnership yielded 54 goals in one season, taking West Ham to 3rd place in the league.

He then moved to Newcastle United in October 1986. He almost single-handedly helped the club avoid relegation, scoring in seven consecutive games from 25 March to 18 April 1987.

He then moved on to Derby County in 1988 before signing for Millwall for a club record transfer fee in December 1989.

In 1991, he moved to Ipswich Town on a free transfer and enjoyed a few more years in the Premier League before retiring in 1994. During the 1994/95 season, he was temporarily caretaker-manager with old teammate John Wark between the departure of John Lyall and the arrival of George Burley and went on to become the club's youth team coach.

Later he worked as assistant manager at West Ham United for Glenn Roeder, a former teammate when he played at QPR and Newcastle United. He left that post on 20 January 2004, shortly after the arrival of new manager Alan Pardew.

=== International career ===
During his playing career, he gained caps for England U21s (scoring five times). Goddard was capped once for England at senior level, on 2 June 1982, a 1–1 friendly draw against Iceland, during which he scored England's only goal. The game was originally an England B fixture but was subsequently upgraded to full international status meaning Goddard was awarded his cap. Despite this successful appearance, he was not selected for the World Cup squad that summer and never played a senior match for England again.

== Personal life ==
As of 2008, Goddard lives with his family in East Bergholt, Suffolk and since 2005 has worked for the Stellar Group for their football agency.

== Honours ==
West Ham United

- Football League Second Division: 1980–81
- Football League Cup runner-up: 1980–81

Ipswich Town

- Football League Second Division: 1991–92

England Under 21

- UEFA European Under-21 Championship: 1982

Individual

- PFA Team of the Year: 1980–81 Second Division
- Newcastle United Player of the Year: 1986–87
