= Phil Parkes (footballer, born 1950) =

English footballer

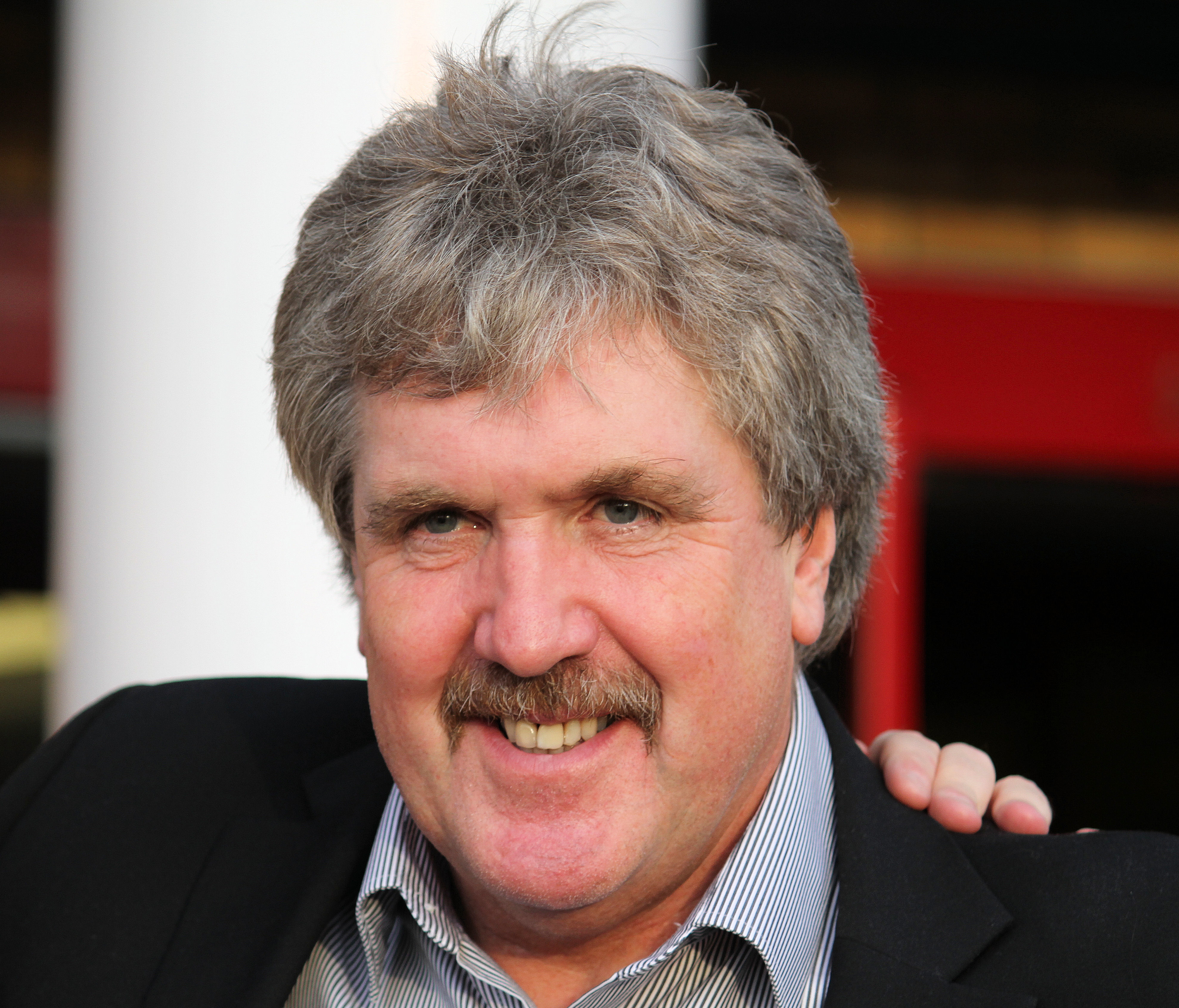
- Phil Parkes at the Boleyn Ground 11 September 2010

Personal information
- Full name: Philip Benjamin Neil Frederick Parkes
- Date of birth: 8 August 1950 (age 76)
- Place of birth: Sedgley, England
- Height: 6 ft 3 in (1.91 m)
- Position: Goalkeeper

Senior career*
Years	Team	Apps	(Gls)
1968–1970	Walsall	52	(0)
1970–1979	Queens Park Rangers	344	(0)
1979–1990	West Ham United	344	(0)
1990–1991	Ipswich Town	3	(0)
Total		743	(0)

International career
1972–1975	England U23	6	(0)
1974	England	1	(0)
1978	England U21	1	(0)
1979	England B	1	(0)
- * Club domestic league appearances and goals

Philip Benjamin Neil Frederick Parkes (born 8 August 1950, Sedgley, Staffordshire, England) is a former football goalkeeper.

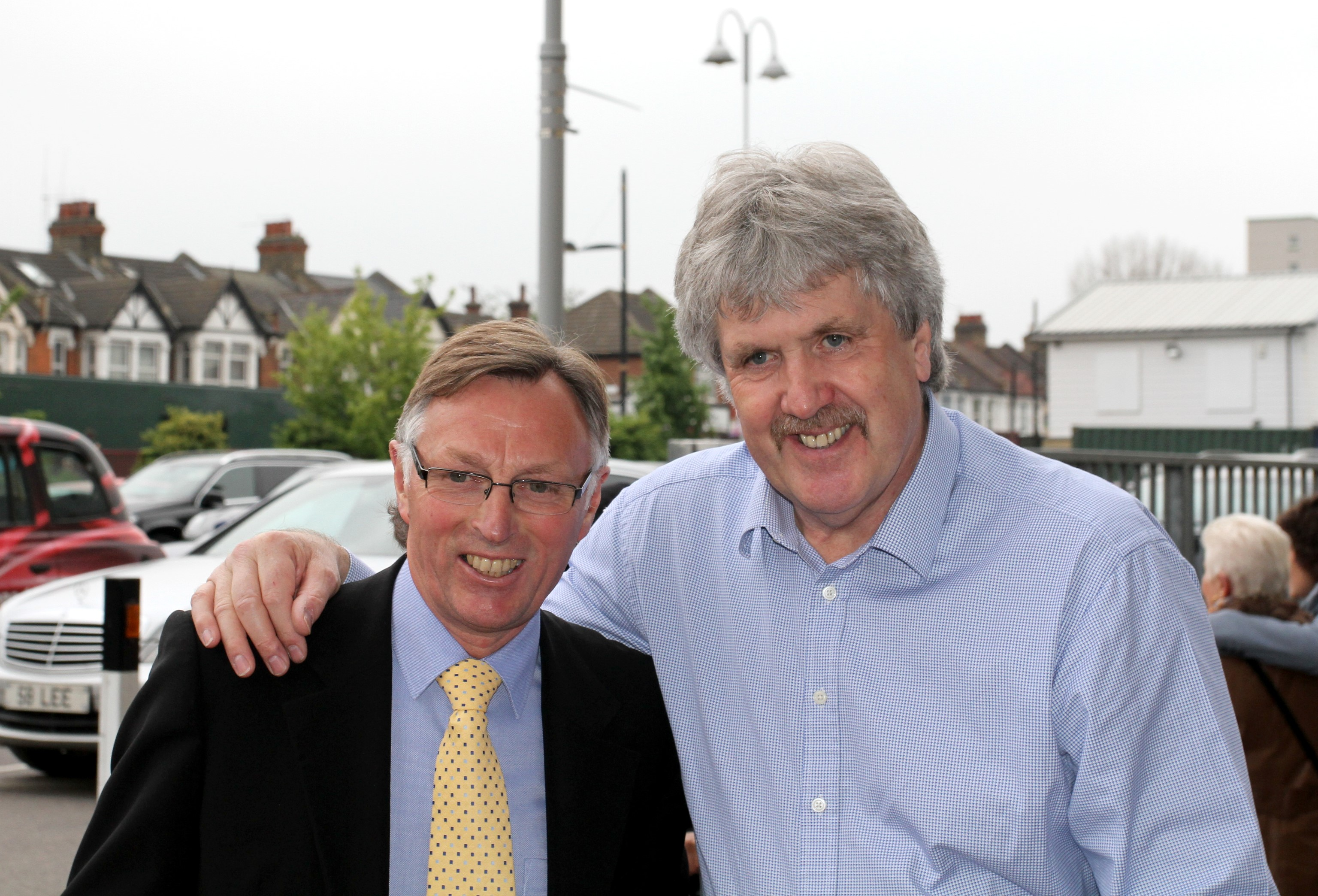
Phil Parkes with fellow ex-Hammer Alan Taylor at Upton Park 2 May 2015

== Early life ==
Phil Parkes grew up in Monument Lane, Sedgley, and was a pupil at nearby Dormston School.

== Football career ==
Beginning his football career at Walsall, turning professional in 1968, he made over 50 appearances in the Black Country before moving to London, signing for Queens Park Rangers for £15,000 in June 1970. His QPR debut was on Saturday 22 August 1970 in a 3–1 defeat at home to Leicester City.

Parkes was part of the QPR team that reached the last eight of the FA Cup in 1974 and were League runners-up to Liverpool in 1976. His club career at QPR spanned 344 league appearances (406 in all competitions). He gained his only England cap during this period, against Portugal in 1974.

Parkes was sold to West Ham United in 1979 for £565,000, a world record for a goalkeeper at the time. It is reported that Sexton, who by then was manager of Manchester United, put in six bids for the player but saw them all turned down. It was only the half-million-pound bid from West Ham United that QPR chairman Jim Gregory could not resist. Upon John Lyall's signing of Parkes, it was thought that he was a risk due to the severity of the condition of his knees, but his signing was to pay off as Parkes was to remain first choice keeper for the next decade. Despite this long spell, most of which was spent in the First Division, he only ever gained one piece of silverware, when West Ham beat Arsenal 1–0 to win the 1980 FA Cup final.

Parkes appeared as himself in Thunderbolt and Smokey! in the boys' comic Eagle in 1982, giving a coaching session to a schoolboy striker who was having to play in goal in a cup semi-final due to the regular keeper being injured.

Although Parkes collected just one major trophy during his long playing career, his time at Upton Park saw him come close to picking up honours more than once later on in the 1980s. He was on the losing side in the 1981 Football League Cup Final against Liverpool, the same year that he collected a Second Division title medal as West Ham returned to the First Division after three years away. In 1983–84, West Ham were in the title race for the first half of the season but fell away to finish ninth. They re-emerged as title challengers in 1985–86 and were in the hunt for the title up to the penultimate game of the season, finally finishing third.

Parkes also helped West Ham reach the League Cup semi-finals in 1988–89, but it was a disappointing season for the club who were then relegated to the Second Division. Parkes had sat out much of the season, despite new signing Allen McKnight making many mistakes, before Parkes was finally reinstated as first choice. Parkes finished his West Ham career having played exactly the same number of league games for them as he had for QPR – 344.

Parkes is the only footballer ever to have played in excess of 400 matches for two different English league clubs.

In 1990, just before his 40th birthday, he left West Ham on a free transfer after 11 years and was signed by John Lyall, who had just returned to management at Ipswich Town, to complete his playing career in Suffolk. He played three league games in 1990–91 before finally retiring as a player and moved into coaching.

In 2003, an official West Ham United members poll for the greatest West Ham XI named him as the team's goalkeeper, beating Ludek Miklosko to that position. He is considered by QPR supporters to be one of the three best goalkeepers in the club's history, the others being Reg Allen and David Seaman.

Parkes had great ability, and was unfortunate to only ever win one England cap. He would have won a second soon after his first as, during a game against Wales in 1976, the manager Don Revie said Parkes would play the second half, but at half-time with the score still at 0–0 Revie decided to keep Ray Clemence on. After the game, Parkes went home and said to his wife he would never make himself available for England again.

== Personal life ==
In 2014, Parkes received treatment for Dukes stage A bowel cancer.

== Honours ==
West Ham United

- Football League Second Division: 1980–81
- FA Cup: 1979–80
- Football League Cup runner-up: 1980–81

Individual

- PFA Team of the Year: 1979–80 Second Division, 1980–81 Second Division
- West Ham United Hammer of the Year: 1980–81
