= Jimmy Neighbour =

English footballer

Personal information
- Full name: James Edward Neighbour
- Date of birth: 15 November 1950
- Place of birth: Chingford, England
- Date of death: 11 April 2009 (aged 58)
- Place of death: Woodford Green, London, England
- Position: Winger

Senior career*
| Years | Team | Apps | (Gls) |
| 1966–1976 | Tottenham Hotspur | 119 | (8) |
| 1976–1979 | Norwich City | 106 | (5) |
| 1979 | Seattle Sounders | 21 | (1) |
| 1979–1983 | West Ham United | 73 | (5) |
| 1983 | → Bournemouth (loan) | 6 | (0) |
| 1984–1985 | Cheshunt | 2 | (0) |
| Total | | 327 | (19) |

Managerial career
- 1996–1998: St Albans City
- * Club domestic league appearances and goals

James Edward Neighbour (15 November 1950 – 11 April 2009) was an English professional footballer who played for Tottenham Hotspur, Norwich City, West Ham United and the Seattle Sounders.

== Football career ==
Neighbour joined Spurs as an apprentice in November 1968. He made his senior debut against Stoke City at White Hart Lane in October 1970. A traditional right winger who had the ability to beat defenders, he played on 156 occasions including 22 as substitute and scoring 11 goals in all competitions between 1970 and 1976. The highlight of Neighbour's career at the club was the winning of a League Cup medal in the 1971 Football League Cup Final. He transferred to Norwich City in September 1976 for a £75,000 fee and went on to play 106 matches including two as sub and netting five goals for the Carrow Road club between 1976–1979. West Ham United paid £150,000 for his services in September 1979, where he featured in 97 games in all competitions, scoring six times. Despite not being part of West Ham's victorious 1980 FA Cup Final squad he did contribute four appearances during the cup run. Neighbour was involved in a loan deal which took him to Bournemouth in January 1983, where he played a further six matches. At the end of the 1984–85 season, he played two games for Isthmian League side Cheshunt, but declined to appear for them the following season.

== Management and coaching career ==
After retiring from competitive football, Neighbour joined Enfield as coach under manager Eddie McCluskey, which culminated in the club winning the FA Trophy in 1988. He moved on to West Ham United to become their Youth Development Officer, before acting as Doncaster Rovers assistant manager. Neighbour spent a further two years as manager of St Albans City. He later became a coach of the Tottenham Hotspur's Under 17s team at the Spurs Academy.

== Death ==
Jimmy Neighbour died on 11 April 2009 from a heart attack whilst at home in Woodford Green, London. He had been recovering at home after a hip replacement operation.

== Honours ==
Tottenham Hotspur

- Football League Cup: 1970–71

West Ham United

- Football League Cup runner-up: 1980–81
