= David Cross (footballer, born 1950) =

English footballer (born 1950)

Personal information
- Date of birth: 8 December 1950 (age 75)
- Place of birth: Heywood, England
- Height: 5 ft 11 in (1.80 m)
- Position: Striker

Youth career
- Rochdale

Senior career*
Years	Team	Apps	(Gls)
1969–1971	Rochdale	59	(21)
1971–1973	Norwich City	84	(21)
1973–1976	Coventry City	91	(29)
1976–1977	West Bromwich Albion	38	(18)
1977–1982	West Ham United	179	(78)
1982–1983	Manchester City	31	(12)
1983	Vancouver Whitecaps	26	(19)
1983–1984	Oldham Athletic	22	(6)
1984	Vancouver Whitecaps	20	(10)
1984–1985	West Bromwich Albion	16	(2)
1985–1986	Bolton Wanderers	20	(8)
1985–1986	→ Bury (loan)	13	(0)
1986–1987	Aris Limassol		
- Blackpool
Total		599	(224)
- * Club domestic league appearances and goals

David Cross (born 8 December 1950) is an English former footballer who played as a striker. He scored 223 goals in 599 appearances in the Football League and the North American Soccer League. Cross was born in Heywood, Lancashire.

== Football career ==
Cross played for Third Division club Rochdale, where he scored against top-flight Coventry City in a third-round FA Cup game in 1971. He moved to Norwich City, with whom he won the Second Division championship in 1972. He joined Coventry City for £150,000, then a club record. In 1975–76, Cross scored hat-tricks on the opening and closing days the season, the only Coventry City player to do so in a league campaign. He joined West Bromwich Albion for £150,000 in November 1976, and made his Albion debut against Manchester City.

West Ham United also broke their club record for Cross when they paid for £180,000 for his services on 9 December 1977. He made his debut a week later, against West Brom. Cross scored 9 goals in 21 league games during his initial season at the club, but this wasn't enough to prevent relegation to the Second Division. His first full season brought 18 goals, with 12 the following season.

Cross was asked to play as the lone striker during the 1980 FA Cup Final win against Arsenal. He scored 22 goals with the side that won the Second Division in 1980–81, winning the division's Golden Boot and ensuring the club's promotion back to the First Division.

On 1 October 1980, Cross scored West Ham United's first, and to date only, hat-trick in European competition in a 5–1 win against Castilla.

Following promotion, Cross again became the club's top scorer for the 1981–82 season, with 16 goals. He scored four goals in a game on two occasions, against Grimsby Town on 11 April 1981, and against Tottenham Hotspur on 2 September 1981. Cross was the last player to score four goals in a single league match for West Ham for almost 40 years until Michail Antonio also achieved this in a match against Norwich City on 11 July 2020.

Cross played his last game for the east London club on 15 May 1982, scoring against Wolverhampton Wanderers at Molineux. He went on to play for Manchester City and Oldham Athletic, and spent the summers of 1983 and 1984 with Vancouver Whitecaps (where he totalled 46 appearances and 29 goals), before rejoining West Brom for the 1984–85 season. He signed for Bolton Wanderers in 1985–86, but a fractured skull helped to end his professional career in England and he ended the season with a loan spell at Bury. He then had a brief spell with Aris Limassol of Cyprus, and finished his career at Blackpool.

After retirement, Cross spent nine years in the insurance industry, and scouted for Watford. He joined the coaching staff at Oldham Athletic in 1997. He coached the reserves and youth-team before moving up to assistant manager to Iain Dowie in 2002. In February 2003, he was released from his contract with the club in serious financial difficulties. He later became a scout for West Ham. Cross also worked on opposition analysis for Blackburn Rovers, leaving the post in 2016.

== Personal life ==
Cross has three children who have achieved some success in sport. Robert played Second XI cricket for Lancashire for many years, and acted as twelfth man for Lancashire First XI on several occasions. He is captain of Heywood Cricket Club of the Central Lancashire League and is the club's highest ever run scorer having amassed over 14000 runs to date, including 18 centuries. Jennifer played Netball Superleague for Northern Thunder and Leeds Met Carnegie, and has appeared in the Lancashire Women's Cricket set-up. Kathryn, the youngest, played cricket for Lancashire Women's First XI at the age of 13; at 15 she was the first girl to be named in the Lancashire County Boys Academy, and progressed to the England Women's Academy and Development Squad. Having impressed for England women's academy in 2010, Kathryn was called up to England women's tour of Australia in January 2011 following injuries to Claire Taylor and Beth Morgan.

== Honours ==
Norwich City

- Football League Second Division: 1971–72
- Football League Cup runner-up: 1972–73

West Ham United

- Football League Second Division: 1980–81
- FA Cup: 1979–80
- Football League Cup runner-up: 1980–81

Individual

- Football League Second Division Golden Boot: 1980–81 (34 goals)
- NASL All-Star: 1983 (honorable mention)

== Bibliography ==
- Davage, Mark; Eastwood, John & Platt, Kevin (2001). Canary Citizens. Jarrold Publishing. ISBN 0-7117-2020-7.
