= 1980 FA Cup final =

English association football match

- Match programme cover
- Event: 1979–80 FA Cup
Arsenal	West Ham United
0	1
- Date: 10 May 1980
- Venue: Wembley Stadium, London
- Referee: George Courtney (County Durham)
- Attendance: 100,000

The 1980 FA Cup final was contested by Arsenal and West Ham United at Wembley. West Ham won by a single goal, scored by Trevor Brooking. To date, it is the last time a team from outside the top flight has won the FA Cup. It was West Ham's third FA Cup triumph and the last time that they had won a major trophy until their UEFA Europa Conference League victory in 2023.

== Match details ==
The 1980 Cup Final was the 99th final to be played since 1872, and the 52nd to be played at Wembley since 1923. The tie involved Arsenal, who had played in the previous two FA Cup Finals and were a strong First Division side, and two-time F.A. Cup winners West Ham United, a Second Division side that had only ever played at Wembley five times before and were huge underdogs on the day.

Present as the royal guests were the Duke and Duchess of Kent. The Duke was introduced to the teams directly after the national anthem and just prior to kick off. West Ham won the coin toss and captain Billy Bonds chose to stay at the end his team was already at.

The game started slowly with Arsenal playing their traditional defensive keep ball style of football. West Ham gained possession after Arsenal gave away a free kick due to Liam Brady being caught offside. After this West Ham maintained possession, frustrating Arsenal before Alan Devonshire broke down the left wing in the 12th minute, hitting a cross into the Arsenal box which fell to David Cross, whose shot was blocked by Arsenal's Willie Young. Stuart Pearson then shot at the Arsenal goal but his shot went across the goalmouth, where England international Trevor Brooking was the fastest player to react; with the Arsenal defence stranded he flicked a header past Jennings for the only goal of the game after 13 minutes.

Arsenal and West Ham both had attacks during the rest of the first half, Arsenal having more of the game as had been anticipated, but Phil Parkes and the West Ham defence held firm and they were unable to unlock the West Ham defence. The second half was again mainly Arsenal in possession, but the underdogs held out and almost made it two with minutes remaining. Paul Allen was through on goal with only Pat Jennings to beat, when Young tackled the 17-year-old, taking him down just outside the penalty box. It was a challenge from behind on the then youngest player to play in an FA Cup Final at Wembley, but Young only earned himself a yellow card (the professional foul rule had not yet been instituted).

Despite their possession, Arsenal failed to break West Ham down in the second half, and West Ham ran out 1–0 winners. Bonds collected the trophy from the Duchess of Kent, and raised it above his head toward the jubilant West Ham fans to a chorus of cheers and "I'm Forever Blowing Bubbles", the East End team's adopted anthem.

== Match line-ups ==
10 May 1980

Arsenal	0–1	West Ham United
	(Report)	Brooking 13'

Wembley, London
Attendance: 100,000
Referee: George Courtney (County Durham)

Arsenal	West Ham United

GK	1	(Northern Ireland) Pat Jennings
RB	2	(Northern Ireland) Pat Rice (c)
LB	3	(Republic of Ireland) John Devine	(substituted off) 61'
CM	4	(England) Brian Talbot
CB	5	(Republic of Ireland) David O'Leary
CB	6	(Scotland) Willie Young
CM	7	(Republic of Ireland) Liam Brady
CF	8	(England) Alan Sunderland
CF	9	(Republic of Ireland) Frank Stapleton
RM	10	(England) David Price
LM	11	(England) Graham Rix
Substitute:
LB	12	(Northern Ireland) Sammy Nelson	(substituted on) 61'
Manager:
(Northern Ireland) Terry Neill

GK	1	(England) Phil Parkes
RB	2	(Scotland) Ray Stewart
LB	3	(England) Frank Lampard Sr.
CB	4	(England) Billy Bonds (c)
CB	5	(England) Alvin Martin
LM	6	(England) Alan Devonshire
RM	7	(England) Paul Allen
CF	8	(England) Stuart Pearson
CF	9	(England) David Cross
CM	10	(England) Trevor Brooking
CM	11	(England) Geoff Pike
Substitute:
LB	12	(England) Paul Brush
Manager:
(England) John Lyall

Match rules

- 90 minutes.
- 30 minutes of extra-time if necessary.
- Replay if scores still level.
- One substitute.
