= Ray Stewart (Scottish footballer) =

Scottish footballer (born 1959)

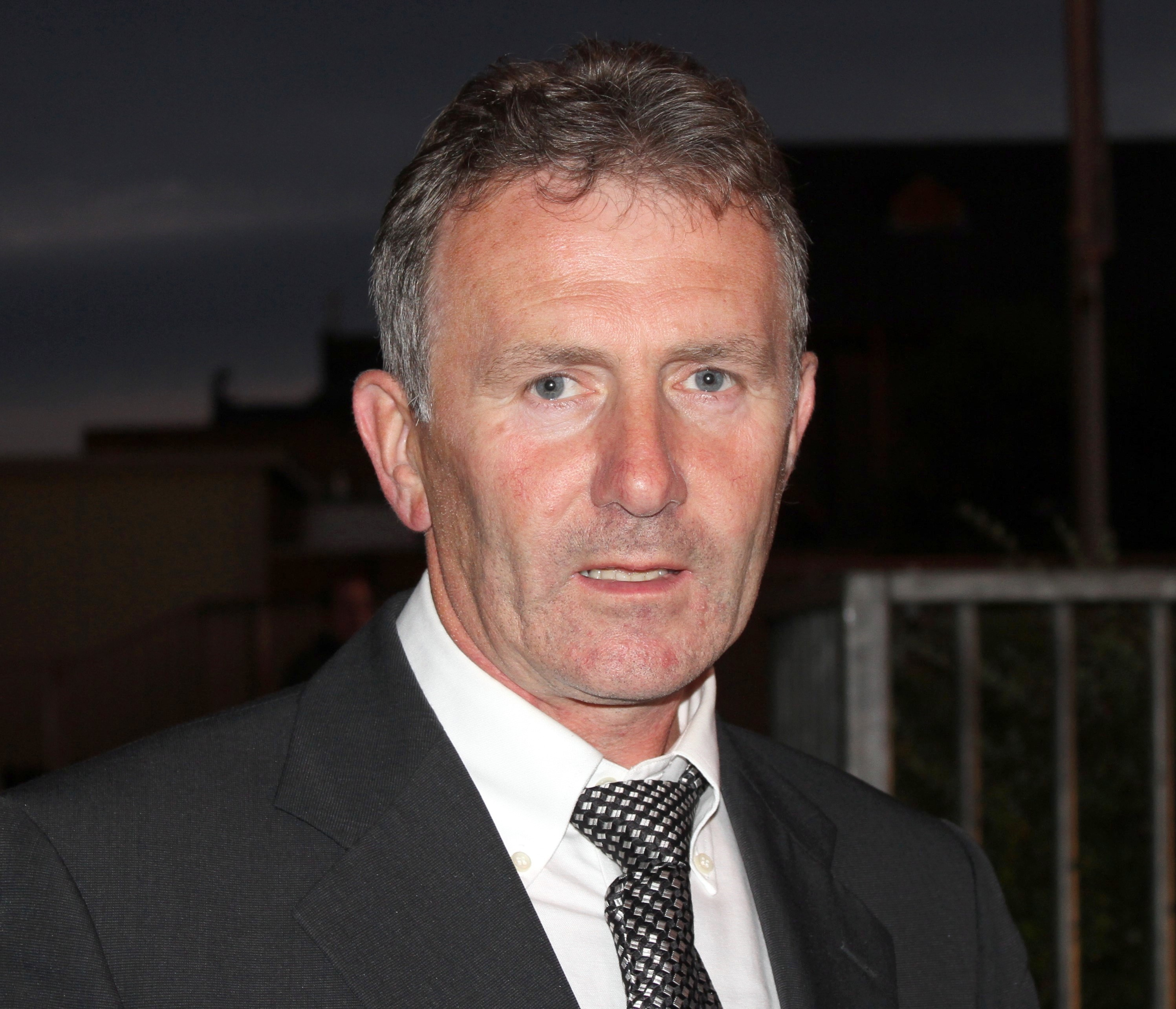
- Stewart at Upton Park in 2010

Personal information
- Full name: Raymond Struan McDonald Stewart
- Date of birth: 7 September 1959 (age 67)
- Place of birth: Stanley, Perthshire, Scotland
- Position: Defender

Senior career*
Years	Team	Apps	(Gls)
1976–1979	Dundee United	44	(5)
1979–1991	West Ham United	345	(62)
1991–1992	St Johnstone	17	(3)
1994–1995	Stirling Albion	2	(0)
Total		408	(70)

International career
1981–1987	Scotland	10	(1)

Managerial career
- 1998–2000: Livingston
- 2000–2002: Stirling Albion
- 2003–2004: Forfar Athletic
- * Club domestic league appearances and goals

Raymond Struan McDonald Stewart (born 7 September 1959) is a Scottish former footballer, who played as a defender for Dundee United, West Ham United, St Johnstone and Stirling Albion. During his career, he won the 1979–80 FA Cup with West Ham and played in 10 full internationals for Scotland. Nicknamed Tonka, Stewart was renowned for his shooting, which meant that he scored 70 league goals during his career (mostly from penalties). After his playing career ended, he managed Livingston, Stirling Albion and Forfar Athletic.

== Club career ==
=== Dundee United ===
Stewart was born in Stanley, Perthshire. He played local football with Errol Rovers in the Dundee Sunday Boys' League before joining Dundee United in May 1973, turning down offers from other clubs, including Glasgow Rangers. He made his debut days before his 17th birthday against Celtic where, playing as a midfielder, he was tasked with marking Kenny Dalglish. He was voted SPFA Young Player of the Year in 1979.

=== West Ham United ===
After three seasons with Dundee United, he came to the attention of West Ham United. Turning down an initial bid of £175,000, he transferred to West Ham for a fee of £430,000 in 1979, making him the most expensive teenage footballer at the time. Stewart made his West Ham debut on 4 September 1979, playing as a defender, in a League Cup game against Barnsley. His first West Ham goal, a penalty, came on 29 September 1979 in a 2–1 home win against Burnley. In 1980 West Ham won the FA Cup. Stewart was West Ham's top scorer, playing a vital part in their victory, including two goals in the fourth round against Leyton Orient and a last minute penalty winner in the quarter-final against Aston Villa. In the semi-final replay on 16 April 1980, against Everton, Stewart was moved into central defence replacing an injured Alvin Martin. The following season Stewart was a vital member of the team which won the 1980–81 Football League Division Two, playing 41 games and scoring five goals, all penalties. Renowned for his ability as a penalty taker he only missed 10 out of 86 penalties he took. One of his penalties came in the 1–1 draw with Liverpool in the 1981 Football League Cup Final, West Ham however lost the replay.

Stewart continued to be an important member of the West Ham side throughout the 1980s including scoring six goals, again all penalties, in their highest finish of third, in the Football League in 1985–86; a season in which he finished third highest scorer for West Ham behind Tony Cottee and Frank McAvennie. In 1989, with West Ham fighting a relegation battle, Stewart suffered a serious injury in the first half of a game in January against Derby County. He ruptured two of the four ligaments around his knee including the main anterior cruciate ligament. He was out-of-action for fourteen months. He returned in a reserve team game in March 1990 and played seven games in a month in a bid to get fit. This proved to be too many games and he needed a further operation on his knee. He returned for the beginning of the 1990–91 season having been recalled by new West Ham manager, Billy Bonds. His injury, along with further problems with hamstring injuries, meant his appearances became fewer with none at all between January 1989 and April 1991. He made a substitute appearance in West Ham's 4–0 1991 FA Cup semi-final defeat to Nottingham Forest on 14 April 1991 coming on to replace Martin Allen and just five in the West Ham side which won promotion from the 1990–91 Second Division. His last game came on 4 May 1991 in a 1–1 draw at Selhurst Park against Charlton Athletic. Following his run of injuries, aged 31, Stewart was not offered a further contract and was released on a free transfer.

Stewart scored 84 goals, all but six being penalties, in 434 games for West Ham. Despite playing in defence he was sent off only twice in his West Ham career, neither for fouls committed but on both occasions for comments made to referees or linesmen in games against Aston Villa and Liverpool. In all of West Ham's three FA Cup triumphs, 1964, 1975 and 1980, he is also notable as the only non-English player to appear in any of the West Ham winning teams. He became a favourite with the fans who nicknamed him "Tonka" after Tonka Toys, which were described as 'indestructible'.

=== St Johnstone ===
In 1991, Stewart returned to Scotland to play for St Johnstone and, in 1994, briefly for Stirling Albion.

== International career ==
Following his performances with newly promoted West Ham in the 1980–81 season, Stewart was called up by manager Jock Stein for Scotland making his debut on 15 May 1981 against Wales in Swansea. A sending-off following an incident with Mark Hateley in an under 21 game against England at Hampden Park in April 1982 cost him his place in that year's Scotland World Cup squad and he did not play international football under Stein but was recalled under new Scotland manager Andy Roxburgh, playing three more games. He made ten appearances in all, scoring one goal in a 2–0 win against Northern Ireland on 19 May 1981 at Hampden in the British Home Championship.

=== International goals ===
Scores and results list Scotland's goal tally first, score column indicates score after Stewart goal.

International goal scored by Ray Stewart
#	Date	Venue	Opponent	Score	Result	Competition
1	19 May 1981	Hampden Park, Glasgow, Scotland	Northern Ireland	1–0	2–0	Home Championship

== Managerial career ==
In 1998, Stewart began his career as a manager, with spells at Livingston, Stirling Albion and Forfar Athletic. He was sacked in 2000 by Livingston as their directors believed he was not capable of guiding the club to the top tier of Scottish football. His two-season stint with Stirling Albion came to an end in 2002 when he was told his contract would not be renewed after Stirling had been relegated to the Third Division. His last managerial post, with Forfar Athletic, came to an end in November 2004 when he was sacked after a 5–1 first round Scottish Cup defeat by Montrose.

== Managerial statistics ==
As of 24 March 2012

Team	Nation	From	To	Matches	Won	Drawn	Lost	Win %
Livingston	Scotland	1 August 1997	20 March 2000	121	61	33	27	50.41
Stirling Albion	Scotland	17 May 2000	30 April 2002	89	19	33	37	21.35
Forfar Athletic	Scotland	13 January 2003	28 November 2004	87	30	26	31	34.48
Total				297	110	92	95	37.04

== Honours ==
West Ham United

- FA Cup: 1979–80
- Football League Cup runner-up: 1980–81
