= John Lyall =

English footballer and manager (1940–2006)

Personal information
- Full name: John Angus Lyall
- Date of birth: 24 February 1940
- Place of birth: Ilford, England
- Date of death: 18 April 2006 (aged 66)
- Place of death: Tattingstone, England
- Position: Defender

Youth career
- 1955–1959: West Ham United

Senior career*
Years	Team	Apps	(Gls)
1959–1963	West Ham United	31	(0)

International career
1957	England Youth	1	(0)

Managerial career
- 1974–1989: West Ham United
- 1990–1994: Ipswich Town
- * Club domestic league appearances and goals

John Angus Lyall (24 February 1940 – 18 April 2006) was an English footballer and manager primarily known for his 34 years at West Ham United. He played for the club as a youth, then as a first-team player before injury cut short his career. He then joined the coaching staff, before becoming the manager of the senior team in 1974. He stayed in that role until 1989. He subsequently went on to manage Ipswich Town from 1990 to 1994.

== Early life ==
Lyall was of Scottish descent. His mother, Catherine, was from the Isle of Lewis, and his father, James, was from Kirriemuir. He was born in Ilford, Essex.

== Club career ==
Watched by the club's manager, Ted Fenton, and chief scout Wally St Pier, Lyall was offered a place at West Ham United aged fifteen. In October 1955 he was taken on as a groundstaff boy, with duties such as boot cleaning, painting the football stands and wages clerk. He played youth team football as a left back. In February 1957 he won his only significant international honour when he played for England Youth in a 7–1 victory over Luxembourg at Upton Park. In 1957 he was also a member of the West Ham side which lost 8–2, on aggregate, to Manchester United in the FA Youth Cup Final.

He made his senior debut in April 1959. His first team career was interrupted and prematurely ended by a serious injury to his left knee. In January 1964 after making 36 appearances in all competitions, aged 23, he was diagnosed with an inoperable, generally disarranged knee and retired from playing professional football. Lyall was granted a testimonial game by West Ham which was played in April 1964 and netted him £3797. He was offered the role of part-time youth team manager.

== Managerial career ==
=== West Ham United ===
Impressing at part-time youth manager Lyall was offered the role on a full-time basis in 1967. He rose through the coaching ranks at Upton Park to succeed Ron Greenwood as team manager in September 1974, managing West Ham for 15 years (1974–1989). In 1975, at the end of his first season as manager, West Ham won the FA Cup final and reached the final of the European Cup Winners' Cup the following year, losing 4–2 to Anderlecht. However, West Ham slipped down to the Second Division in 1978. Lyall attempted to rebuild the side and made significant purchases in Phil Parkes, £565,000 from Queens Park Rangers, a world record for a goalkeeper and Ray Stewart from Dundee United for £430,000, a British record for a teenager. West Ham returned to the First Division in 1981 winning the title by a thirteen-point margin.

During their exile from the top flight, on 10 May 1980, West Ham beat Arsenal in the FA Cup final, the last team outside the top flight to do so. In their 1981 promotion season, Lyall also led the Hammers to the final of the League Cup – where they drew 1–1 against Liverpool, before losing the replay 2–1, having led early in the match. They also reached the quarter-finals of the European Cup Winners' Cup in the same year, losing to eventual winners Dinamo Tbilisi.

West Ham spent the first four years back in the top flight consolidating their position. Long serving Trevor Brooking and Frank Lampard both retired and Billy Bonds was struggling with the effects of first team football. Lyall again attempted to rebuild the team, bringing Frank McAvennie from St Mirren and Mark Ward from Oldham Athletic. 28 goals from McAvennie, 25 from Tony Cottee and an eighteen-game unbeaten run saw Lyall take West Ham to their highest ever league finish in the 1985–86 First Division campaign when they finished third behind champions Liverpool and runners-up Everton. However, they were unable to compete in the UEFA Cup because of the ban on English teams from European competition arising from the previous year's Heysel Disaster. Lyall was unable to build on the side which finished third in the First Division. McAvennie was sold to Celtic in 1987 and Cottee to Everton in July 1988 for a British transfer record of £2.05 million. Their replacements combined with the additions of Tommy McQueen, Gary Strodder, David Kelly, Allen McKnight, Liam Brady, Julian Dicks and the return of McAvennie in March 1989 failed to save West Ham from relegation in May 1989. Lyall was sacked in June 1989. He was awarded an ex gratia payment of £100,000 but left the club in what Lyall described as 'upsetting' circumstances, meriting only 73 words in a terse acknowledgement of his service in the club programme, Lyall left West Ham after 34 years service.

=== Ipswich Town ===
He made his return to football management on 11 May 1990 with Ipswich Town. During the 1989–90 season, he acted as technical advisor to Terry Venables.

After Ipswich finished 14th in his first season, he brought John Wark back to Portman Road for a third spell.

At the end of 1991–1992, Lyall guided Ipswich Town to the Second Division championship and promotion to the newly formed Premiership. In January 1993, Ipswich were fourth in the Premiership but a dip in form during the final weeks of the season saw Ipswich finish 16th. The following season, 1993–94, brought a similar pattern; a good start followed by a slump – Ipswich finished 19th in the final table and were only saved from relegation by Sheffield United's late 3–2 defeat at Chelsea. Lyall resigned as Ipswich Town manager in December 1994, with the club bottom of the Premiership.

== Death ==
Lyall died suddenly on 18 April 2006, after suffering a heart attack, at his home in Tattingstone, Suffolk, at the age of 66. He was survived by his wife of more than 40 years, Yvonne, and his son Murray. After leaving football management in December 1994, he had bought a farm in Suffolk and was still living there at the time of his death.

== Legacy ==
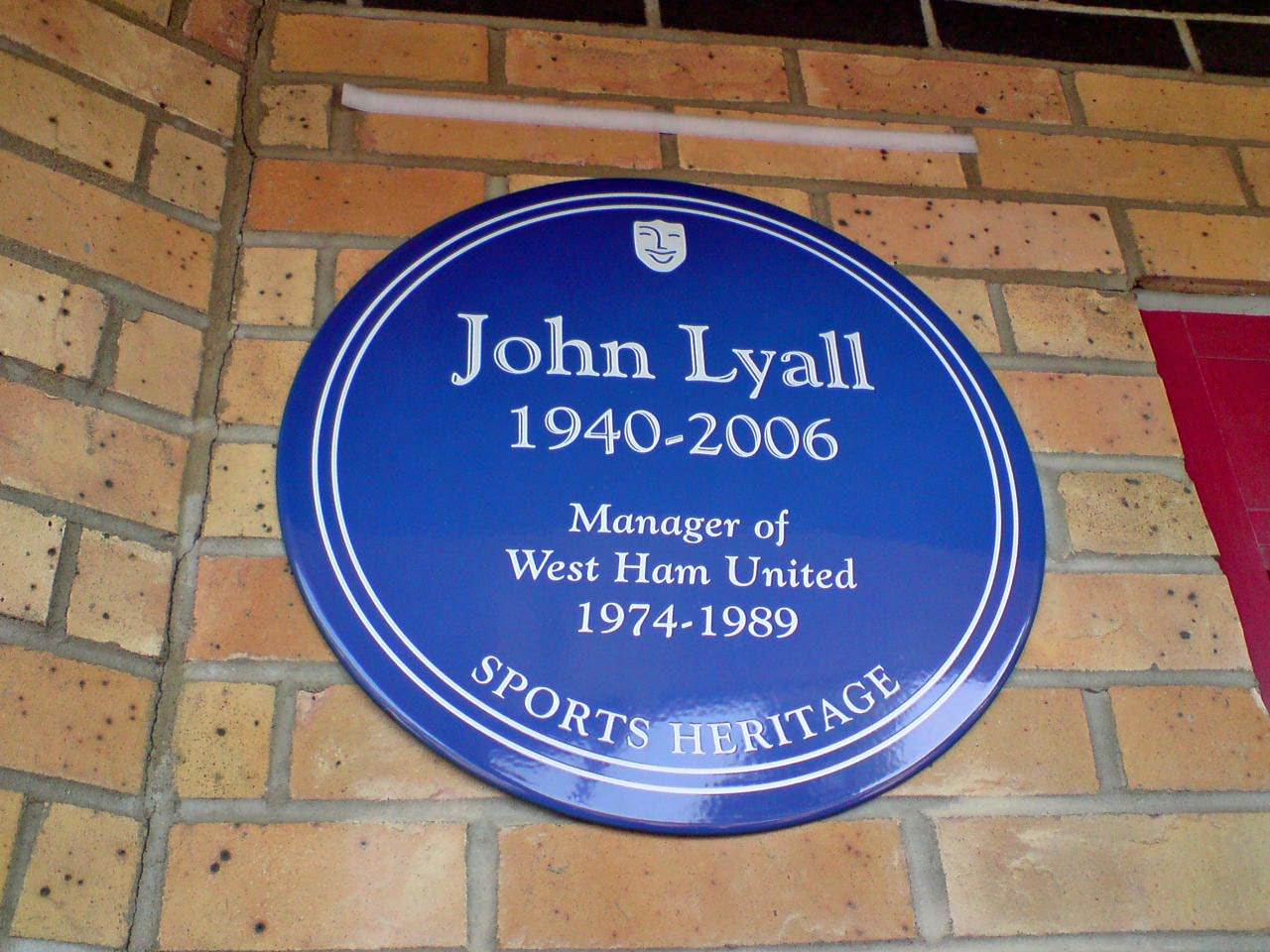
Sports Heritage Blue Plaque for John Lyall at West Ham's Boleyn Ground

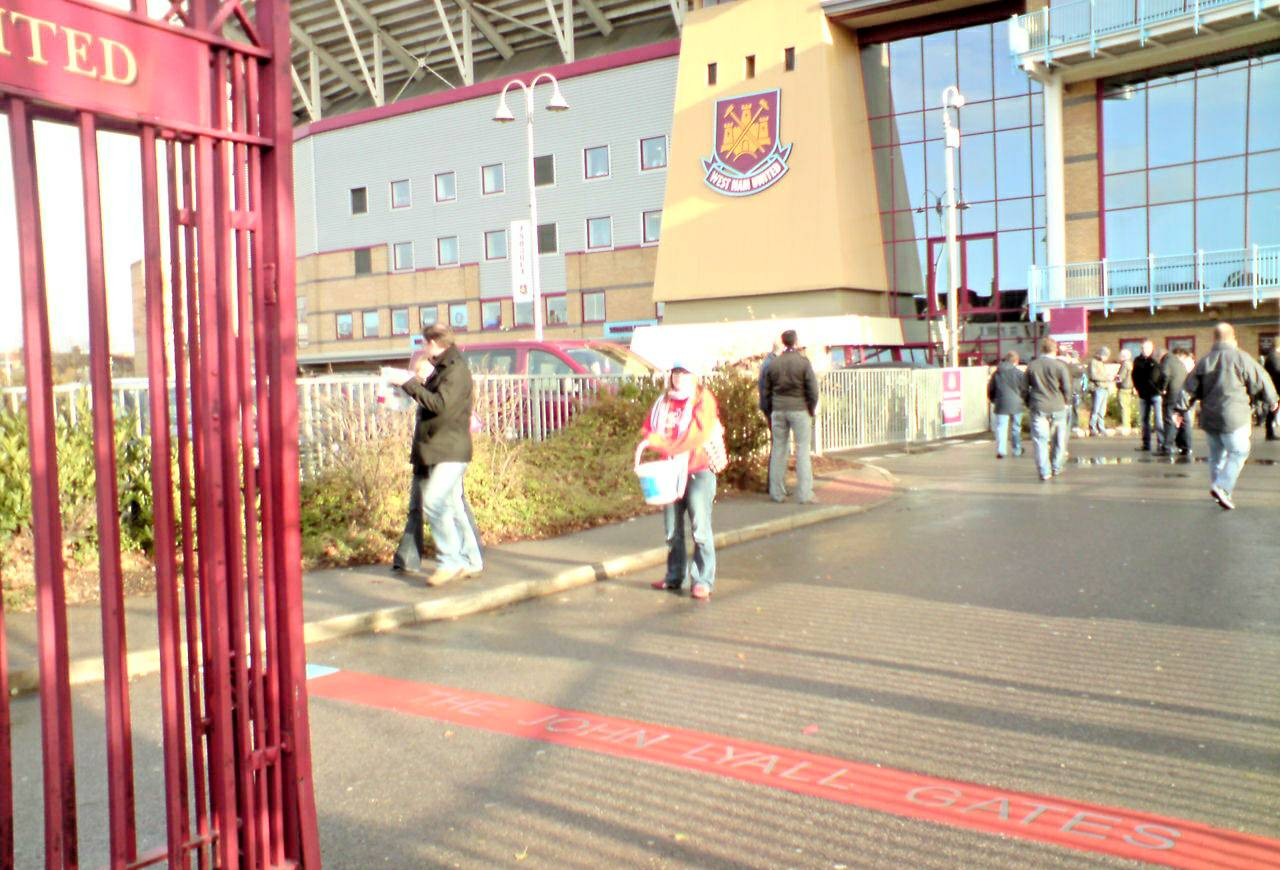
Sign showing 'The John Lyall Gates' at the entrance to West Ham's Boleyn Ground

When West Ham played Middlesbrough in the FA Cup Semi-final on 23 April 2006 at Villa Park, a one-minute silence was held in Lyall's honour, although after only a few seconds the West Ham fans started a chant of "Johnny Lyall's Claret and Blue Army" in tribute to their most successful ever manager. West Ham won the match 1–0 to reach their first FA Cup Final since 1980 when Lyall was in charge. On 5 December 2007, it was announced that the Heritage Foundation charity would be erecting a blue plaque in Lyall's memory at West Ham's Upton Park ground on 20 January 2008.

In December 2009, West Ham renamed the main gates to Upton Park as The John Lyall Gates. West Ham announced in May 2015 that as part of their relocation to the Olympic Stadium in 2016, the gates would be moved to the new site. They are currently on display in the club's official store.

In October 2025, some of Lyall’s medals and awards were sold by auctioneers, Barnebys. These included his winner’s medal from the 1975 FA Cup final which fetched £6606.43, the winner’s medal from the 1980 FA Cup final which fetched £6007.77, his England youth cap from 1957 which fetched £400 and his 1991/92 Ipswich Town manager of the season trophy, his contracts at West Ham and his football tie collection.

== Honours ==
=== As manager ===
West Ham United

- Football League Second Division: 1980–81
- FA Cup: 1974–75, 1979–80
- Football League Cup runner-up: 1980–81
- European Cup Winners' Cup runner-up: 1975–76

Ipswich Town

- Football League Second Division: 1991–92

Individual

- Ipswich Town Hall of Fame: 2014

== Managerial statistics ==
Managerial record by team and tenure
Team	From	To	Record				
Team	From	To	P	W	D	L	Win %
West Ham United	16 August 1974	5 June 1989	770	308	194	268	40.0
Ipswich Town	11 May 1990	5 December 1994	231	77	75	79	33.3
Total			1,001	385	269	347	38.5

== See also ==
- List of longest managerial reigns in association football
- List of football managers with the most matches
