= Alvin Martin =

English footballer (born 1958)

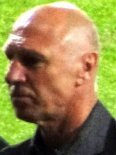

Personal information
- Full name: Alvin Edward Martin
- Date of birth: 29 July 1958 (age 68)
- Place of birth: Walton, Liverpool, England
- Height: 6 ft 1 in (1.85 m)
- Position: Defender

Youth career
- Everton
- 1974–1978: West Ham United

Senior career*
| Years | Team | Apps | (Gls) |
| 1978–1996 | West Ham United | 469 | (27) |
| 1996–1997 | Leyton Orient | 17 | (0) |
| Total | | 486 | (27) |

International career
| 1976 | England Youth | 1 | (0) |
| 1981–1984 | England B | 2 | (1) |
| 1981–1986 | England | 17 | (0) |

Managerial career
- 1997–1999: Southend United
- * Club domestic league appearances and goals

Alvin Edward Martin (born 29 July 1958) is an English football manager, former professional footballer and pundit.

As a player, he was a defender, playing most of his footballing career for West Ham United he appeared in 598 games for them, scoring 34 goals. With the club for 21 years, and winning the 1980 FA Cup. He played in a number of Premier League seasons before leaving for Leyton Orient in 1996. He moved into football management with Southend United in 1997. He was capped 17 times England during the 1980s, Martin represented them at the 1986 World Cup.

He has since started a career in the media on radio station talkSPORT and also as a pundit on Sky Sports TV football talk shows.

== Club career ==
Born in Walton, Liverpool, Lancashire, Martin played schools football for Bootle and Lancashire and was attached to Merseyside club Everton as a schoolboy, but left in 1974 after the Goodison Park club only offered him an apprenticeship on a part-time basis. An unsuccessful trial later that summer with Queens Park Rangers was followed the very next day by one for West Ham United, where he was awarded a contract as an apprentice 19 August 1974. He appeared in the FA Youth cup final of 1975 and signed as a professional on 29 July 1976. He did not make his first team debut until 18 March 1978 as a substitute against Aston Villa. His final appearance was as an 88th-minute substitute on 5 May 1996 against Sheffield Wednesday.

Martin went on to amass nearly 600 first-team appearances for the Hammers in a successful 19-year professional career at Upton Park, in which he became one of only two players, along with Billy Bonds, to be awarded two testimonials. The first was against Spurs on 21 August 1988 and the second against Chelsea on 11 November 1995. It was alongside Bonds in the centre of defence that Martin – nicknamed 'Stretch' – enjoyed his most rewarding years, winning the FA Cup and Second Division winners medals in successive seasons, 1980 and 1981. Martin won 3 player of the year awards.

Martin also achieved the rare feat of scoring a hat-trick against three different Newcastle United goalkeepers – Martin Thomas, who was then injured, and outfield players Chris Hedworth and Peter Beardsley – in a Football League First Division match in April 1986 which the Hammers won 8–1. This was among the most successful seasons the club ever saw, as it finished third in the top level, just four points behind champions Liverpool, with the player contributing with 40 games and four goals.

Martin remained loyal to West Ham despite their relegation from the top flight in 1989, and helped them gain promotion two years later. The club lasted just one season before again dropping down a level, only to bounce back at the first attempt. Martin, for decades the club's longest serving player, spent three more years with the team in the Premier League before finally departing at the end of the 1995–96 season after 21 years service, aged 37. After leaving West Ham, Martin had a brief spell with East London neighbours Leyton Orient.

== International career ==
Martin was given his first England cap by Ron Greenwood against Brazil at Wembley in May 1981. Injury ruled him out of the 1982 FIFA World Cup finals in Spain, but he was playing some of the finest football of his career when the next manager, Bobby Robson, included him in his squad for the 1986 edition in Mexico: he played in the victory over Paraguay, replacing the suspended Terry Fenwick, but was dropped for the next game, the quarter-final defeat by Argentina's infamous 'Hand of God'; in total, he made 17 international appearances.

== Managerial career ==
Martin managed Southend United for two years (1997- March 1999), during which the club was relegated to League One.

== Media career ==
After retiring from management, he joined national radio station talkSPORT, while also being a regular pundit on Sky Sports TV football talk shows.

== Personal life ==
Martin's sons, David and Joe, are also footballers. The former is a goalkeeper, whilst the latter is a defender.

== Honours ==
West Ham United

- FA Cup: 1979–80
- Football League Cup runner-up: 1980–81

Individual

- PFA Team of the Year: 1980–81 Second Division
