= 1980–81 Football League Cup =

League Cup

Tournament details
- Country: England; Wales
- Teams: 92

Final positions
- Champions: Liverpool (1st title)
- Runners-up: West Ham United

Tournament statistics
- Goals scored: Kenny Dalglish (7 goals)

The 1980–81 Football League Cup was the 21st season of the Football League Cup, a knockout competition for England's top 92 football clubs. The competition started on 8 August 1980 and ended with the final replay on 1 April 1981.

The final was contested by First Division team Liverpool and Second Division West Ham United at Wembley Stadium in London and the replay was played at Villa Park in Birmingham.

== First round ==
=== First leg ===
Home team	Score	Away team	Date
Aldershot	2–0	Wimbledon	9 August 1980
Blackburn Rovers	0–0	Huddersfield Town	9 August 1980
Bournemouth	1–1	Swindon Town	9 August 1980
Brentford	3–1	Charlton Athletic	9 August 1980
Bury	2–2	Halifax Town	9 August 1980
Carlisle United	2–0	Rochdale	9 August 1980
Chester	1–1	Stockport County	9 August 1980
Chesterfield	1–0	Darlington	9 August 1980
Colchester United	0–2	Gillingham	9 August 1980
Doncaster Rovers	1–1	Mansfield Town	9 August 1980
Exeter City	1–1	Bristol Rovers	9 August 1980
Grimsby Town	1–0	Notts County	9 August 1980
Hereford United	1–0	Newport County	9 August 1980
Lincoln City	5–0	Hull City	8 August 1980
Northampton Town	0–2	Reading	9 August 1980
Peterborough United	3–2	Fulham	9 August 1980
Plymouth Argyle	0–1	Portsmouth	9 August 1980
Port Vale	2–3	Tranmere Rovers	9 August 1980
Rotherham United	1–3	Bradford City	9 August 1980
Scunthorpe United	0–1	Barnsley	9 August 1980
Sheffield Wednesday	2–0	Sheffield United	9 August 1980
Southend United	1–0	Oxford United	9 August 1980
Torquay United	0–0	Cardiff City	9 August 1980
Walsall	2–3	Blackpool	9 August 1980
Watford	2–1	Millwall	9 August 1980
Wigan Athletic	2–1	Crewe Alexandra	9 August 1980
Wrexham	1–3	Burnley	9 August 1980
York City	2–1	Hartlepool United	9 August 1980

=== Second leg ===
Home team	Score	Away team	Date	Agg
Barnsley	2–1	Scunthorpe United	12 August 1980	3–1
Blackpool	3–1	Walsall	13 August 1980	6–3
Bradford City	0–0	Rotherham United	13 August 1980	3–1
Bristol Rovers	1–1	Exeter City	12 August 1980	2–2
Burnley	2–1	Wrexham	12 August 1980	5–2
Cardiff City	2–1	Torquay United	13 August 1980	2–1
Charlton Athletic	5–0	Brentford	12 August 1980	6–3
Crewe Alexandra	2–2	Wigan Athletic	13 August 1980	3–4
Darlington	1–2	Chesterfield	12 August 1980	1–3
Fulham	1–1	Peterborough United	12 August 1980	3–4
Gillingham	2–1	Colchester United	12 August 1980	4–1
Halifax Town	0–1	Bury	12 August 1980	2–3
Hartlepool United	0–0	York City	12 August 1980	1–2
Huddersfield Town	1–1	Blackburn Rovers	12 August 1980	1–1
Hull City	0–2	Lincoln City	12 August 1980	0–7
Mansfield Town	2–1	Doncaster Rovers	12 August 1980	3–2
Millwall	0–2	Watford	12 August 1980	1–4
Newport County	5–0	Hereford United	12 August 1980	5–1
Notts County	3–0	Grimsby Town	12 August 1980	3–1
Oxford United	2–0	Southend United	13 August 1980	2–1
Portsmouth	2–1	Plymouth Argyle	12 August 1980	3–1
Reading	2–3	Northampton Town	13 August 1980	4–3
Rochdale	1–1	Carlisle United	12 August 1980	1–3
Sheffield United	1–1	Sheffield Wednesday	12 August 1980	1–3
Stockport County	1–0	Chester	11 August 1980	2–1
Swindon Town	2–0	Bournemouth	12 August 1980	3–1
Tranmere Rovers	0–1	Port Vale	12 August 1980	3–3
Wimbledon	4–1	Aldershot	12 August 1980	4–3

== Second round ==
=== First leg ===
Home team	Score	Away team	Date
Aston Villa	1–0	Leeds United	27 August 1980
Birmingham City	2–1	Bristol City	26 August 1980
Blackburn Rovers	0–0	Gillingham	27 August 1980
Bolton Wanderers	0–3	Crystal Palace	26 August 1980
Bradford City	1–0	Liverpool	27 August 1980
Brighton & Hove Albion	3–1	Tranmere Rovers	26 August 1980
Burnley	0–2	West Ham United	26 August 1980
Cambridge United	3–1	Wolverhampton Wanderers	26 August 1980
Cardiff City	1–0	Chelsea	27 August 1980
Carlisle United	1–2	Charlton Athletic	26 August 1980
Chesterfield	3–1	Oxford United	26 August 1980
Everton	3–0	Blackpool	26 August 1980
Leyton Orient	0–1	Tottenham Hotspur	27 August 1980
Lincoln City	1–1	Swindon Town	27 August 1980
Manchester United	0–1	Coventry City	27 August 1980
Mansfield Town	0–0	Barnsley	26 August 1980
Middlesbrough	3–1	Ipswich Town	26 August 1980
Newcastle United	3–2	Bury	27 August 1980
Newport County	1–1	Notts County	26 August 1980
Nottingham Forest	3–0	Peterborough United	27 August 1980
Oldham Athletic	3–2	Portsmouth	26 August 1980
Preston North End	1–0	Wigan Athletic	26 August 1980
Queens Park Rangers	0–0	Derby County	26 August 1980
Reading	0–2	Luton Town	27 August 1980
Shrewsbury Town	1–1	Norwich City	26 August 1980
Southampton	4–0	Watford	26 August 1980
Stockport County	1–1	Sunderland	27 August 1980
Stoke City	1–1	Manchester City	27 August 1980
Swansea City	1–1	Arsenal	26 August 1980
West Bromwich Albion	1–0	Leicester City	26 August 1980
Wimbledon	2–1	Sheffield Wednesday	26 August 1980
York City	2–1	Bristol Rovers	27 August 1980

=== Second leg ===
Home team	Score	Away team	Date	Agg
Arsenal	3–1	Swansea City	2 September 1980	4–2
Barnsley	4–2	Mansfield Town	2 September 1980	4–2
Blackpool	2–2	Everton	3 September 1980	2–5
Bristol City	0–0	Birmingham City	2 September 1980	1–2
Bristol Rovers	1–0	York City	3 September 1980	2–2
Bury	1–0	Newcastle United	2 September 1980	3–3
Charlton Athletic	2–1	Carlisle United	2 September 1980	4–2
Chelsea	1–1	Cardiff City	3 September 1980	1–2
Coventry City	1–0	Manchester United	2 September 1980	2–0
Crystal Palace	2–1	Bolton Wanderers	2 September 1980	5–1
Derby County	0–0	Queens Park Rangers	3 September 1980	0–0
Gillingham	1–2	Blackburn Rovers	2 September 1980	1–2
Ipswich Town	3–0	Middlesbrough	2 September 1980	4–3
Leeds United	1–3	Aston Villa	3 September 1980	1–4
Leicester City	0–1	West Bromwich Albion	3 September 1980	0–2
Liverpool	4–0	Bradford City	2 September 1980	4–1
Luton Town	1–1	Reading	2 September 1980	3–1
Manchester City	3–0	Stoke City	3 September 1980	4–1
Norwich City	2–0	Shrewsbury Town	3 September 1980	3–1
Notts County	2–0	Newport County	2 September 1980	3–1
Oxford United	3–0	Chesterfield	3 September 1980	4–3
Peterborough United	1–1	Nottingham Forest	3 September 1980	1–4
Portsmouth	1–0	Oldham Athletic	2 September 1980	3–3
Sheffield Wednesday	3–1	Wimbledon	2 September 1980	4–3
Sunderland	1–2	Stockport County	3 September 1980	2–3
Swindon Town	2–0	Lincoln City	2 September 1980	3–1
Tottenham Hotspur	3–1	Leyton Orient	3 September 1980	4–1
Tranmere Rovers	2–4	Brighton & Hove Albion	3 September 1980	3–7
Watford	7–1	Southampton	2 September 1980	7–5
West Ham United	4–0	Burnley	2 September 1980	6–0
Wigan Athletic	1–2	Preston North End	3 September 1980	1–3
Wolverhampton Wanderers	0–1	Cambridge United	2 September 1980	1–4

== Third round ==
=== Ties ===
Home team	Score	Away team	Date
Barnsley	3–2	Cardiff City	23 September 1980
Birmingham City	1–0	Blackburn Rovers	23 September 1980
Brighton & Hove Albion	1–2	Coventry City	23 September 1980
Bristol Rovers	0–0	Portsmouth	23 September 1980
Bury	0–7	Nottingham Forest	23 September 1980
Cambridge United	2–1	Aston Villa	23 September 1980
Charlton Athletic	1–2	West Ham United	23 September 1980
Everton	1–2	West Bromwich Albion	24 September 1980
Ipswich Town	1–1	Norwich City	23 September 1980
Liverpool	5–0	Swindon Town	23 September 1980
Luton Town	1–2	Manchester City	23 September 1980
Notts County	4–1	Queens Park Rangers	23 September 1980
Preston North End	1–0	Oxford United	23 September 1980
Sheffield Wednesday	1–2	Watford	23 September 1980
Stockport County	1–3	Arsenal	22 September 1980
Tottenham Hotspur	0–0	Crystal Palace	24 September 1980

=== Replays ===
Home team	Score	Away team	Date
Crystal Palace	1–3	Tottenham Hotspur	30 September 1980
Norwich City	1–3	Ipswich Town	8 October 1980
Portsmouth	2–0	Bristol Rovers	30 September 1980

== Fourth round ==
=== Ties ===
Home team	Score	Away team	Date
Birmingham City	2–1	Ipswich Town	28 October 1980
Coventry City	1–1	Cambridge United	28 October 1980
Liverpool	4–1	Portsmouth	28 October 1980
Manchester City	5–1	Notts County	29 October 1980
Tottenham Hotspur	1–0	Arsenal	4 November 1980
Watford	4–1	Nottingham Forest	28 October 1980
West Bromwich Albion	0–0	Preston North End	29 October 1980
West Ham United	2–1	Barnsley	28 October 1980

=== Replays ===
Home team	Score	Away team	Date
Cambridge United	0–1	Coventry City	4 November 1980
Preston North End	1–1	West Bromwich Albion	4 November 1980

=== 2nd Replay ===
Home team	Score	Away team	Date
West Bromwich Albion	2–1	Preston North End	12 November 1980

== Fifth round ==
=== Ties ===
Home team	Score	Away team	Date
Liverpool	3–1	Birmingham City	2 December 1980
Manchester City	2–1	West Bromwich Albion	3 December 1980
Watford	2–2	Coventry City	2 December 1980
West Ham United	1–0	Tottenham Hotspur	2 December 1980

=== Replay ===
Home team	Score	Away team	Date
Coventry City	5–0	Watford	9 December 1980

== Semi-finals ==
=== First leg ===
Home team	Score	Away team	Date
Coventry City	3–2	West Ham United	27 January 1981
Manchester City	0–1	Liverpool	14 January 1981

14 January 1981

Manchester City	0–1	Liverpool
		R. Kennedy 81'

Maine Road, Manchester
27 January 1981

Coventry City	3–2	West Ham United
Thompson 71', 90'; Daly 76'		Bonds 26'; Thompson 35' (o.g.)

Highfield Road, Coventry

=== Second leg ===
Home team	Score	Away team	Date	Agg
Liverpool	1–1	Manchester City	10 February 1981	2–1
West Ham United	2–0	Coventry City	10 February 1981	4–3

10 February 1981

Liverpool	1–1	Manchester City
Dalglish 23'		Reeves 50'

Anfield Stadium, Liverpool
10 February 1981

West Ham United	2–0	Coventry City
Goddard 61'; Neighbour 90'

Upton Park Stadium, London
Referee: Keith Hackett

== Final ==
14 March 1981
15:00 GMT

Liverpool	1–1 (a.e.t.)	West Ham United
A. Kennedy 118'		Stewart 120'

Wembley Stadium, London
Attendance: 100,000
Referee: Clive Thomas

=== Replay ===
1 April 1981
19:30 BST

Liverpool	2–1	West Ham United
Dalglish 25'; Hansen 28'		Goddard 5'

Villa Park, Birmingham
Attendance: 36,693
Referee: Clive Thomas
