= 1975–76 European Cup Winners' Cup =

Final positions
- Champions: (Belgium) Anderlecht (1st title)
- Runners-up: (England) West Ham United

The 1975–76 European Cup Winners' Cup was the 16th season of the European Cup Winners' Cup, a club football tournament organised by UEFA for the winners of its member associations' domestic cup competitions. It was won by Anderlecht of Belgium, who beat West Ham United of England in the final. Anderlecht went on to reach the next two finals as well, and won the second of them.

== First round ==
Team 1	Agg.	Team 2	1st leg	2nd leg
Spartak Trnava (Czechoslovakia)	0–3	(Portugal) Boavista	0–0	0–3
Valur (Iceland)	0–9	(Scotland) Celtic	0–2	0–7
Beşiktaş (Turkey)	0–6	(Italy) Fiorentina	0–3	0–3
Panathinaikos (Greece)	0–2	(East Germany) Sachsenring Zwickau	0–0	0–2
Rapid București (Romania)	1–2	(Belgium) Anderlecht	1–0	0–2
Borac Banja Luka (Socialist Federal Republic of Yugoslavia)	14–1	(Luxembourg) Rumelange	9–0	5–1
Wrexham (Wales)	3–2	(Sweden) Djurgården	2–1	1–1
Skeid (Norway)	1–8	(Poland) Stal Rzeszów	1–4	0–4
Sturm Graz (Austria)	3–2	(Bulgaria) Slavia Sofia	3–1	0–1
Haladás (Hungary)	8–1	(Malta) Valletta	7–0	1–1
Basel (Switzerland)	2–3	(Spain) Atlético Madrid	1–2	1–1
Eintracht Frankfurt (West Germany)	11–3	(Northern Ireland) Coleraine	5–1	6–2
Vejle (Denmark)	0–4	(Netherlands) Den Haag	0–2	0–2
Home Farm (Republic of Ireland)	1–7	(France) Lens	1–1	0–6
Ararat Yerevan (Soviet Union)	10–1	(Cyprus) Anorthosis Famagusta	9–0	1–1
Reipas Lahti (Finland)	2–5	(England) West Ham United	2–2	0–3

=== First leg ===
17 September 1975

Spartak Trnava (Czechoslovakia)	0–0	(Portugal) Boavista

Stadion Spartaka, Trnava
Attendance: 14,890
Referee: Ernst Dörflinger-Buser (Switzerland)

17 September 1975

Rapid București (Romania)	1–0	(Belgium) Anderlecht
Thissen 20' (o.g.)

Stadionul 23 August, Bucharest
Attendance: 25,000
Referee: Josef Bucek (Austria)

17 September 1975

Beşiktaş (Turkey)	0–3	(Italy) Fiorentina
		Caso 42', 49'; Casarsa 76'

Istanbul

17 September 1975
20:00

Basel (Switzerland)	1 – 2	(Spain) Atlético Madrid
Schönenberger 3'	FCB Summary	Gárate 65'; Ayala 68'

St. Jakob Stadium, Basel
Attendance: 33,000
Referee: Robert Wurtz (France)

17 September 1975

Ararat Yerevan (Soviet Union)	9–0	(Cyprus) Anorthosis Famagusta
Markarov 4' (pen.), 14', 16', 70', 80'; Oganesian 52', 84'; Petrosyan 72'; Bondarenko 87'

Hrazdan Stadium, Yerevan
Attendance: 12,893
Referee: Béla Nagy (Hungary)

17 September 1975

Borac Banja Luka (Socialist Federal Republic of Yugoslavia)	9–0	(Luxembourg) Rumelange
Cetina 6', 16', 60'; Ibrahimbegović 14', 48', 57', 58', 86'; Jurković 82'	Report

Gradski, Banja Luka
Attendance: 6,270
Referee: Richard Casha (Malta)

=== Second leg ===
1 October 1975

Boavista (Portugal)	3–0	(Czechoslovakia) Spartak Trnava
Mané 35'; Celso 62'; Salvador 79'

Estádio do Bessa, Porto
Attendance: 9,387
Referee: Jacques Van Melkebeeke (Belgium)

Boavista won 3–0 on aggregate.

1 October 1975

Anderlecht (Belgium)	2–0	(Romania) Rapid București
Van Binst 38'; Rensenbrink 50' (pen.)

Émile Versé Stadium, Brussels
Attendance: 17,361
Referee: Michal Jursa (Czechoslovakia)

Anderlecht won 2–1 on aggregate.

1 October 1975

Fiorentina (Italy)	3–0	(Turkey) Beşiktaş
Caso 32', 36'; Casarsa 88'

Florence

Fiorentina won 6–0 on aggregate.

1 October 1975
21:00

Atlético Madrid (Spain)	1 – 1	(Switzerland) Basel
Bezerra 74'	Summary	Demarmels 89'

Vicente Calderón Stadium, Madrid
Attendance: 25,000
Referee: Paul Schiller (Austria)

Atlético Madrid won 3–2 on aggregate.

1 October 1975

Anorthosis Famagusta (Cyprus)	1–1	(Soviet Union) Ararat Yerevan
Vrahimis 66' (pen.)		Bondarenko 65'

GSZ Stadium, Larnaca
Attendance: 1,700
Referee: Constantin Ghita (Romania)

Ararat Yerevan won 9–1 on aggregate.

2 October 1975

Rumelange (Luxembourg)	1–5	(Socialist Federal Republic of Yugoslavia) Borac Banja Luka
Rohmann 79'	Report	Smileski 8'; Kreso 23'; Kovačević 51'; Vidačak 58'; Marjanović 85'

Stade de la Frontière, Esch-sur-Alzette
Attendance: 836
Referee: Georges Konrath (France)

Borac Banja Luka won 14–1 on aggregate.

== Second round ==
Team 1	Agg.	Team 2	1st leg	2nd leg
Boavista (Portugal)	1–3	(Scotland) Celtic	0–0	1–3
Fiorentina (Italy)	1–1 (4–5p)	(East Germany) Sachsenring Zwickau	1–0	0–1
Anderlecht (Belgium)	3–1	(Socialist Federal Republic of Yugoslavia) Borac Banja Luka	3–0	0–1
Wrexham (Wales)	3–1	(Poland) Stal Rzeszów	2–0	1–1
Sturm Graz (Austria)	3–1	(Hungary) Haladás VSE	2–0	1–1
Atlético Madrid (Spain)	1–3	(Germany) Eintracht Frankfurt	1–2	0–1
Den Haag (Netherlands)	6–3	(France) Lens	3–2	3–1
Ararat Yerevan (Soviet Union)	2–4	(England) West Ham United	1–1	1–3

=== First leg ===
22 October 1975

Boavista (Portugal)	0–0	(Scotland) Celtic

Estádio do Bessa, Porto
Attendance: 25,000
Referee: Edgar Pedersen (Denmark)

22 October 1975

Fiorentina (Italy)	1–0	(East Germany) Sachsenring Zwickau
Speggiorin 71'	Report

Stadio Comunale Giovanni Berta, Florence
Attendance: 12,871
Referee: Milos Cajićz (Yugoslavia)

22 October 1975

Anderlecht (Belgium)	3–0	(Socialist Federal Republic of Yugoslavia) Borac Banja Luka
Rensenbrink 11', 54'; Coeck 53'	Report

Stade Émile Versé, Brussels
Attendance: 20,789
Referee: Pablo Sánchez Ibáñez (Spain)

22 October 1975

Wrexham (Wales)	2–0	(Poland) Stal Rzeszów
Ashcroft 10', 34'	Report

Racecourse Ground, Wrexham
Attendance: 9,613
Referee: Erik Axelryd (Sweden)

22 October 1975

Sturm Graz (Austria)	2–0	(Hungary) Haladás VSE
Stendal 55'; Steiner 67' (pen.)	Report

Liebenauer Stadium, Graz
Attendance: 9,000
Referee: Jack Taylor (England)

22 October 1975

Atlético Madrid (Spain)	1-2	(Germany) Eintracht Frankfurt
Capón 50'	Report	Hölzenbein 6', 14'

Estadio Vicente Calderón, Madrid
Attendance: 31,147
Referee: Ken Burns (England)

22 October 1975

Den Haag (Netherlands)	3-2	(France) Lens
Schoenmaker 46'; Van Vliet 49'; Van Leeuwen 65'	Report	Zuraszek 18'; Janković 19'

Zuiderparkstadion, The Hague
Attendance: 18,000
Referee: John Carpenter (Republic of Ireland)

22 October 1975

Ararat Yerevan (Soviet Union)	1-1	(England) West Ham United
S. Petrosyan 68'		Taylor 56'

Hrazdan Stadium, Yerevan
Attendance: 66,662
Referee: Hans-Joachim Weyland (West Germany)

=== Second leg ===
5 November 1975

Celtic (Scotland)	3–1	(Portugal) Boavista
Dalglish 1'; Eðvaldsson 21'; Deans 85'		Mané 39'

Celtic Park, Glasgow
Attendance: 37,000
Referee: Heinz Einbeck (East Germany)

Celtic won 3–1 on aggregate.

5 November 1975

Sachsenring Zwickau (East Germany)	1–0	(Italy) Fiorentina
J. Schykowski 32'	Report
Penalties
J. Schykowski (penalty scored); Leuschner (penalty scored); H. Schykowski (penalty scored); Lippmann (penalty scored); Croy (penalty scored)	5–4	(penalty scored) Caso; (penalty scored) Guerini; (penalty missed) Antognoni; (penalty scored) Roggi; (penalty scored) Bresciani

Georgij-Dimitroff-Stadion, Erfurt
Attendance: 36,000
Referee: Nikolaos Zlatanos (Greece)

1–1 on aggregate; Sachsenring Zwickau won 5–4 on penalties.

5 November 1975

Borac Banja Luka (Socialist Federal Republic of Yugoslavia)	1–0	(Belgium) Anderlecht
Ibrahimbegović 37'	Report

Gradski, Banja Luka
Attendance: 6,740
Referee: Cesare Gussoni (Italy)

Anderlecht won 3–1 on aggregate.

5 November 1975

Stal Rzeszów (Poland)	1-1	(Wales) Wrexham
Kozerski 68'	Report	Sutton 82'

Stal Rzeszów Municipal Stadium, Rzeszów
Attendance: 15,000
Referee: Antoine Quedeville (Luxembourg)

Wrexham won 3–1 on aggregate.

5 November 1975

Haladás VSE (Hungary)	1-1	(Austria) Sturm Graz
Horváth 51'	Report	Jurtin 90'

Haladás Stadion, Szombathely
Attendance: 16,000
Referee: Doğan Babacan (Turkey)

Sturm Graz won 3–1 on aggregate.

5 November 1975

Eintracht Frankfurt (Germany)	1-0	(Spain) Atlético Madrid
Reichel 88'	Report

Waldstadion, Frankfurt
Attendance: 45,000
Referee: Robert Schaut (Belgium)

Eintracht Frankfurt won 3–1 on aggregate.

5 November 1975

Lens (France)	1-3	(Netherlands) Den Haag
Mujica 40' (pen.)	Report	Schoenmaker 28', 89'; Van Leeuwen 29'

Stade Félix-Bollaert, Lens
Attendance: 26,205
Referee: Thomas Reynolds (Wales)

Den Haag won 6–3 on aggregate.

5 November 1975

West Ham United (England)	3-1	(Soviet Union) Ararat Yerevan
Paddon 16'; Robson 27'; Taylor 59'		N. Petrosyan 48'

Boleyn Ground, London
Attendance: 30,399
Referee: Robert Héliès (France)

West Ham United won 4–2 on aggregate.

== Quarter-finals ==
Team 1	Agg.	Team 2	1st leg	2nd leg
Celtic (Scotland)	1–2	(East Germany) Sachsenring Zwickau	1–1	0–1
Anderlecht (Belgium)	2–1	(Wales) Wrexham	1–0	1–1
Sturm Graz (Austria)	0–3	(West Germany) Eintracht Frankfurt	0–2	0–1
Den Haag (Netherlands)	5–5(a)	(England) West Ham United	4–2	1–3

=== First leg ===
3 March 1976

Celtic (Scotland)	1–1	(East Germany) Sachsenring Zwickau
Dalglish 41'	Report	Blank 89'

Celtic Park, Glasgow
Attendance: 46,000
Referee: Erik Axelryd (Sweden)

3 March 1976

Anderlecht (Belgium)	1–0	(Wales) Wrexham
Van Binst 10'	Report

Stade Émile Versé, Brussels
Attendance: 23,055
Referee: Marijan Rauš (Yugoslavia)

2 March 1976

Sturm Graz (Austria)	0–2	(Germany) Eintracht Frankfurt
	Report	Hölzenbein 74'; Wenzel 87'

Liebenauer Stadium, Graz
Attendance: 12,000
Referee: Cesare Gussoni (Italy)

3 March 1976

Den Haag (Netherlands)	4–2	(England) West Ham United
Mansveld 12', 16' (pen.), 39'; Schoenmaker 44'	Report	Jennings 51', 59'

Zuiderparkstadion, The Hague
Attendance: 26,000
Referee: Rudi Glöckner (East Germany)

=== Second leg ===
17 March 1976

Sachsenring Zwickau (East Germany)	1–0	(Scotland) Celtic
Blank 4'	Report

Georgij-Dimitroff-Stadion, Erfurt
Attendance: 40,024
Referee: Ángel Franco Martínez (Spain)

Sachsenring Zwickau won 2–1 on aggregate.

17 March 1976

Wrexham (Wales)	1–1	(Belgium) Anderlecht
Lee 60'	Report	Rensenbrink 76'

Racecourse Ground, Wrexham
Attendance: 19,668
Referee: Ferdinand Biwersi (West Germany)

Anderlecht won 2–1 on aggregate.

16 March 1976

Eintracht Frankfurt (Germany)	1–0	(Austria) Sturm Graz
Hölzenbein 85'	Report

Waldstadion, Frankfurt
Attendance: 17,022
Referee: António Garrido (Portugal)

Eintracht Frankfurt won 3–0 on aggregate.

17 March 1976

West Ham United (England)	3–1	(Netherlands) Den Haag
Taylor 29'; Lampard 32'; Bonds 35' (pen.)	Report	Schoenmaker 59'

Boleyn Ground, London
Attendance: 29,829
Referee: Károly Palotai (Hungary)

5-5 draw on aggregate, West Ham United advance on away goals.

== Semi-finals ==
Team 1	Agg.	Team 2	1st leg	2nd leg
Sachsenring Zwickau (East Germany)	0–5	(Belgium) Anderlecht	0–3	0–2
Eintracht Frankfurt (West Germany)	3–4	(England) West Ham United	2–1	1–3

=== First leg ===
31 March 1976

Sachsenring Zwickau (East Germany)	0–3	(Belgium) Anderlecht
	Report	Van der Elst 26', 38'; Rensenbrink 67'

Georgij-Dimitroff-Stadion, Erfurt
Attendance: 36,246
Referee: Robert Héliès (France)

31 March 1976

Eintracht Frankfurt (Germany)	2–1	(England) West Ham United
Neuberger 29'; Kraus 47'	Report	Paddon 9'

Waldstadion, Frankfurt
Attendance: 50,000
Referee: Vladimir Rudnev (Soviet Union)

=== Second leg ===
14 April 1976

Anderlecht (Belgium)	2–0	(East Germany) Sachsenring Zwickau
Rensenbrink 43'; Van der Elst 58'	Report

Stade Émile Versé, Brussels
Attendance: 25,000
Referee: Pablo Sánchez Ibáñez (Spain)

Anderlecht won 5–0 on aggregate.

14 April 1976

West Ham United (England)	3–1	(Germany) Eintracht Frankfurt
Brooking 49', 77'; Robson 68'	Report	Beverungen 88'

Boleyn Ground, London
Attendance: 39,202
Referee: Walter Hungerbühler (Switzerland)

West Ham United won 4–3 on aggregate.

== Final ==
5 May 1976

West Ham United (England)	2–4	(Belgium) Anderlecht
Holland 28'; Robson 68'		Rensenbrink 42', 73'; Van der Elst 48', 88'

Heysel Stadium, Brussels
Attendance: 51,296
Referee: Robert Wurtz (France)

== See also ==
- 1975–76 European Cup
- 1975–76 UEFA Cup
