= West Ham United F.C. in European football =

English club in European football

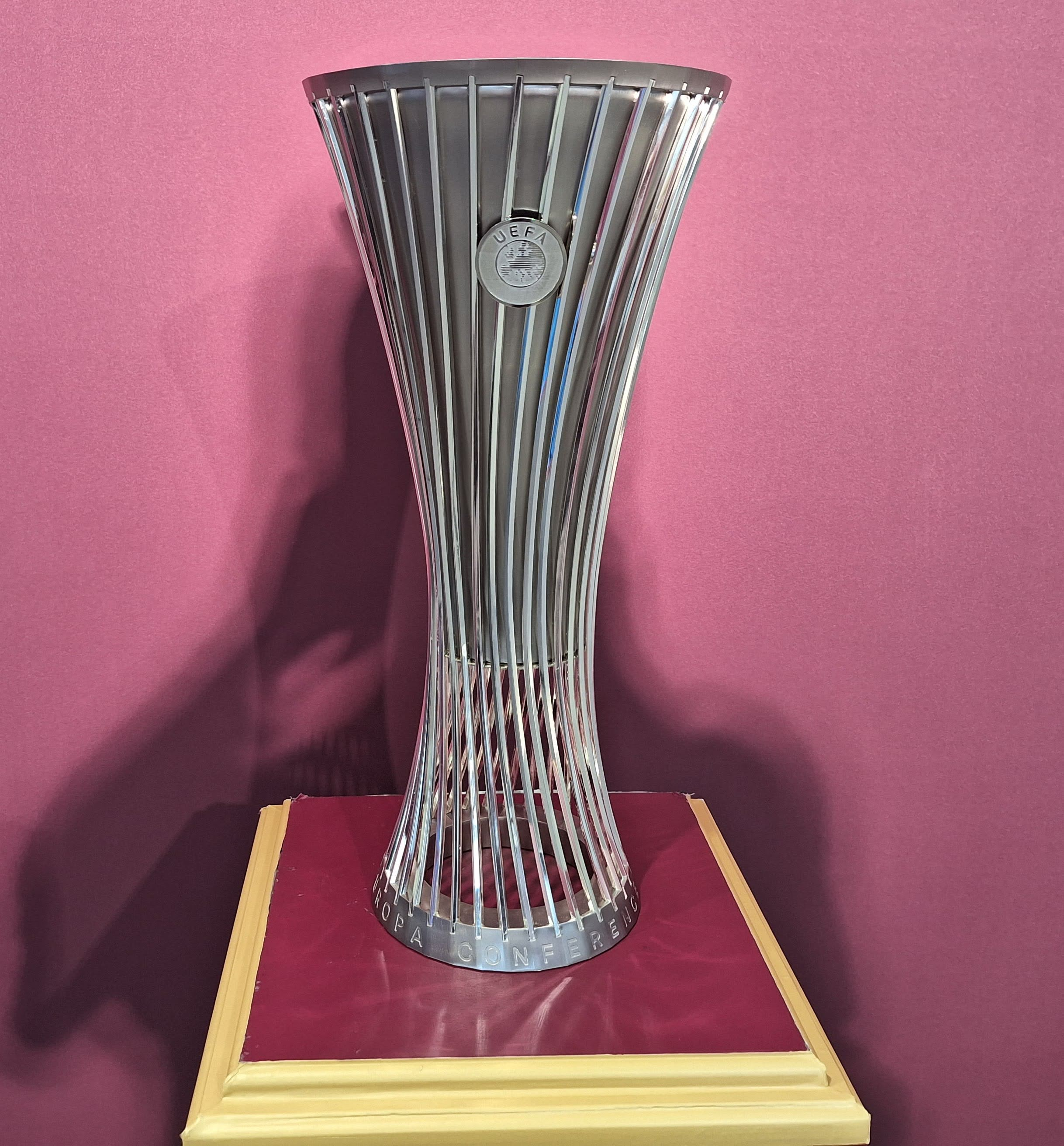
- The UEFA Europa Conference League trophy; won by West Ham United in 2023
- Club: West Ham United
- Seasons played: 11
- Most appearances: Tomáš Souček (32)
- Top scorer: Michail Antonio (10); Jarrod Bowen (10)
- First entry: 1964–65 European Cup Winners' Cup
- Latest entry: 2023–24 UEFA Europa League

Titles
- Cup Winners' Cup: 1965
- Conference League: 2023

West Ham United Football Club is an English professional football club based in Stratford, Newham, East London. They won the European Cup Winners Cup in 1965, the UEFA Intertoto Cup in 1999, and the Europa Conference League in 2023. They have also competed in the UEFA Cup, UEFA Europa League and the UEFA Europa Conference League. Outside of major competitions, the club took part in the Anglo-Italian League Cup in 1975–76, and the Anglo-Italian Cup in 1992–93.

== History ==
West Ham United first travelled into Europe to play football in 1921 when manager Syd King took the team to Spain where they played games against Real Madrid, Celta de Vigo, Athletic Bilbao and Deportivo de La Coruña. In 1924, West Ham were the first club to visit Germany following the culmination of World War I, playing Köln, Waldhof Mannheim, Borussia Mönchengladbach, Eintracht Frankfurt and Freiburger FC. The club subsequently embarked on tours to continental Europe frequently during the 1920s and 1930s, recording a 6–0 victory against Ajax in May 1929. In the early 1960s, West Ham travelled abroad to play frequently with matches in Costa Rica, Sweden, Rhodesia, Ghana, the United States, Austria and West Germany.

=== 1964–65 Cup Winners' Cup ===
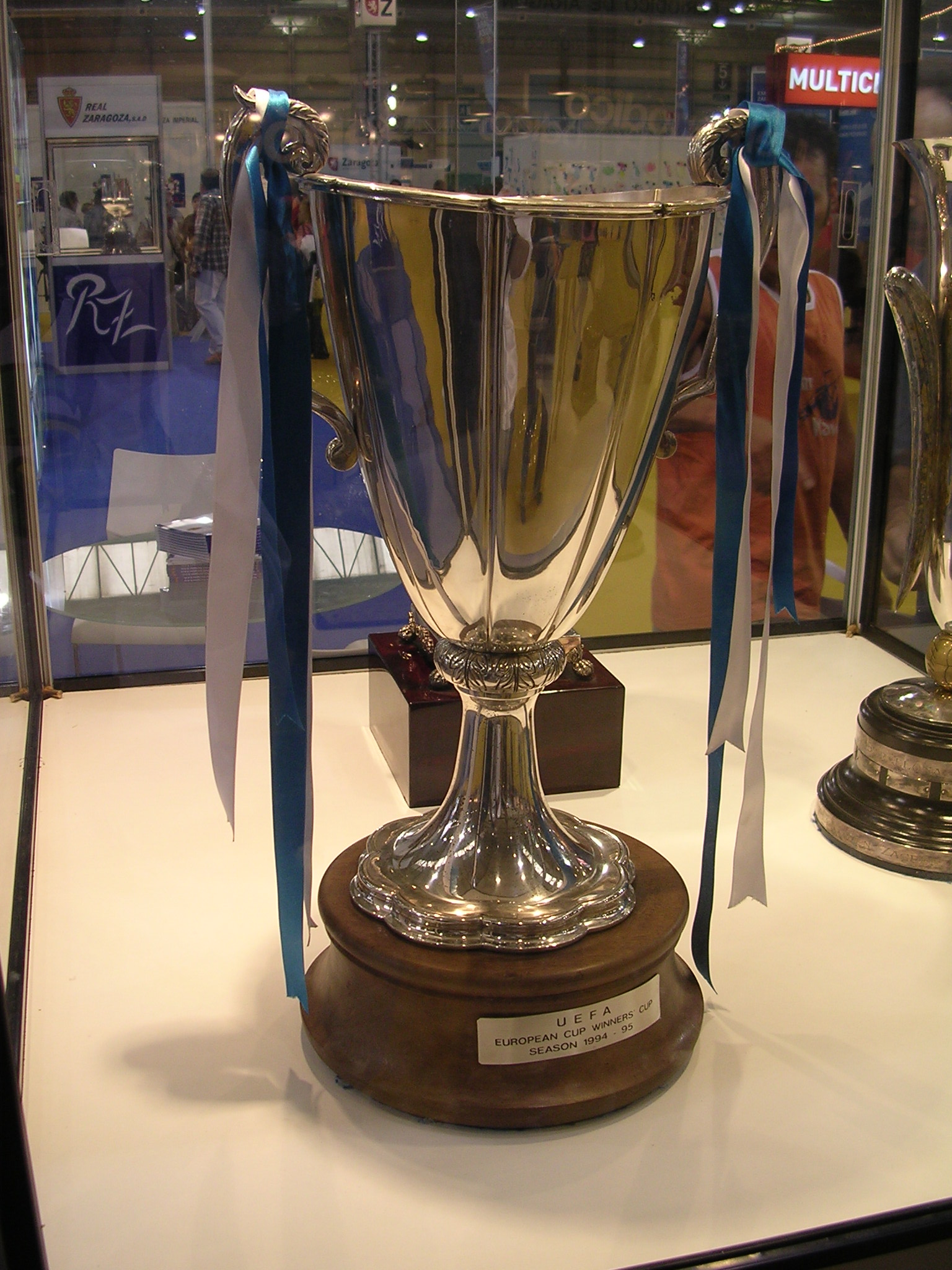
The European Cup Winners' Cup trophy; won by West Ham in 1965

After winning the previous season's FA Cup, manager Ron Greenwood led West Ham into their first European campaign.

West Ham started the competition against La Gantoise, the first Belgian side to play in this competition. In the opening game on 23 September 1964, West Ham won 1–0 in Belgium thanks to a headed Ronnie Boyce goal from an Alan Sealey corner. In the home leg, West Ham fans paid record match receipts to see what was described as a "decrepit performance which brought jeers from the crowd". Martin Peters scored an own goal for La Gentoise before Johnny Byrne scored an equalizer from a cross by Johnny Sissons.

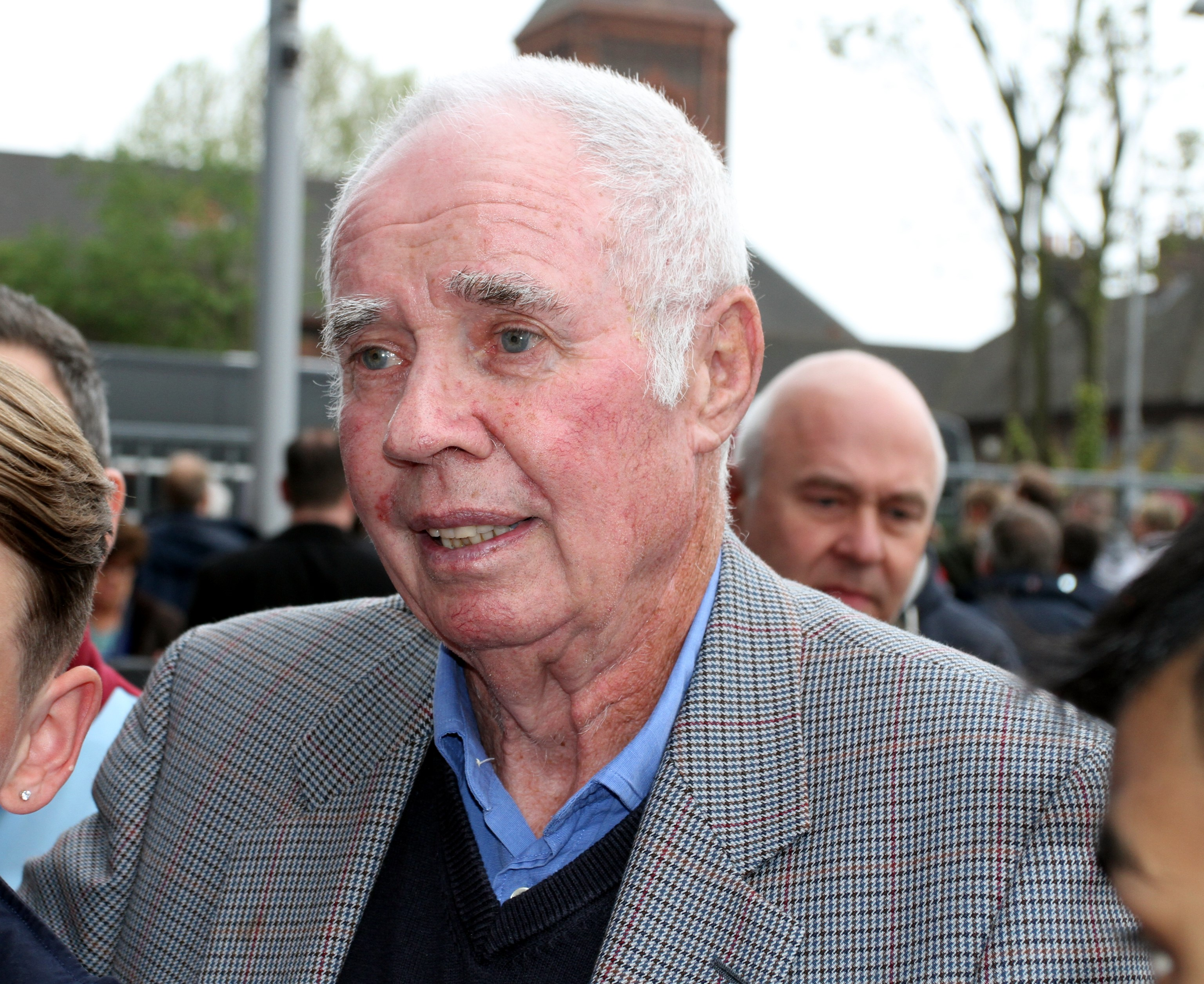
Ronnie Boyce, scorer of West Ham's first European goal

In the second round, West Ham drew Czech side Sparta Prague. The first leg on 25 November contained considerable time-wasting by the Czechs including four times when the ball was kicked clean out of the ground. The match was decided in the second half by a 25-yard shot from full-back, John Bond, his first for three years and Alan Sealey, who scored after his shot had hit the post. In the second leg, on 9 December 1964, Sissons put West Ham 3–0 up on aggregate only for Prague's Gustáv Mráz to score two late goals to finish the tie 3–2 in favour of West Ham.

The quarter-finals matched West Ham against Swiss side Lausanne. In the first leg in Switzerland, Brian Dear, playing in his first European game scored the first goal, Byrne the second before Lausanne scored in the 80th minute through Robert Hosp. The second leg, described as a "thrilling cup-tie" took place at the Boleyn Ground on 23 March 1965. Two goals from Dear, one from Peters and an own goal from Lausanne's Ely Tacchella gave West Ham an aggregate 6–4 win. The Lausanne goals were scored by Pierre Kerkhoffs, Hertig and Norbert Eschmann.

The semi-finals saw West Ham play Spanish side Real Zaragoza. In the first leg in London, West Ham scored two first-half goals through Dear and Byrne. They attempted to defend their lead in the second half by playing nine in defence but conceded a 55th goal scored by Canário. The second leg in Spain finished as a 1–1 draw with goals from Sissons and Zaragoza's Carlos Lapetra. Zaragoza were denied three penalty appeals and blamed the referee for their defeat.

The final against West German side 1860 Munich was played at Wembley on 19 May 1965 in front of 100,000 spectators. Two second-half goals from Alan Sealey saw West Ham win the competition. Manager Greenwood, in his 1984 book Yours Sincerely, noted the significant roles played by Sealey, Dear and Bobby Moore in the final but also praised West Ham's defence, particularly the efforts of goalkeeper Jim Standen and defender Jack Burkett.

Season	Competition	Round	Opposition	Home	Attendance	Away	Attendance	Aggregate
1964–65	European Cup Winners' Cup	First round	(Belgium) La Gantoise	1–1	24,000	1–0	18,000	2–1
1964–65	European Cup Winners' Cup	Second round	(Czechoslovakia) Sparta Prague	2–0	27,590	1–2	45,000	3–2
1964–65	European Cup Winners' Cup	Quarter-finals	(Switzerland) Lausanne	4–3	31,780	2–1	20,000	6–4
1964–65	European Cup Winners' Cup	Semi-finals	(Spain) Zaragoza	2–1	35,086	1–1	28,000	3–2
1964–65	European Cup Winners' Cup	Final	(West Germany) 1860 Munich	2–0			100,000	N/A

=== 1965–66 Cup Winners' Cup ===
After winning the previous season's Cup Winners' Cup, West Ham began another campaign in the same competition, and as holders received a bye in the first round.

In the second round, they played Greek side Olympiacos. In the first leg at the Boleyn Ground, West Ham won 4–0 with goals from Johnny Byrne, Peter Brabrook and two from Geoff Hurst. The away leg a week later finished 2–2. In a game refereed by future 1966 FIFA World Cup Final linesman Tofiq Bahramov, Martin Peters scored twice for West Ham with an own goal by Eddie Bovington and an 80th penalty by Kostas Polychroniou for Olympiakos.

East German team 1. FC Magdeburg were West Ham's opponents in the quarter-finals. The East Germans spent much of the game defending in the first leg in London and were beaten only by a single goal, by Johnny Byrne. In Magdeburg, Joachim Walter scored in the 78th minute to make the game 1–1 on aggregate. Johnny Sissons equalized almost from kick-off, in the 79th minute, to put West Ham through 2–1.

West Germany provided the opponents in the semi-finals with Borussia Dortmund. Bobby Moore, who had stated his desire to leave the club, was replaced as captain by Johnny Byrne. The West Germans won 2–1 at the Boleyn Ground. Although Martin Peters scored first, Lothar Emmerich scored in the 86th and 87th minute to take a lead to the second leg in Dortmund. On 13 April in West Germany, Dortmund scored in the first minute through Emmerich, who added another in the 28th minute and although Peters scored to make the game 2–4 on aggregate, Gerhard Cyliax scored a third Dortmund goal in the 87th minute to put them through to the final, 5–2 on aggregate.

Season	Competition	Round	Opposition	Home	Attendance	Away	Attendance	Aggregate
1965–66	European Cup Winners' Cup	First round	Bye					
1965–66	European Cup Winners' Cup	Second round	(Greece) Olympiacos	4–0	27,270	2–2	40,000	6–2
1965–66	European Cup Winners' Cup	Quarter-finals	(East Germany) 1. FC Magdeburg	1–0	30,620	1–1	35,000	2–1
1965–66	European Cup Winners' Cup	Semi-finals	(West Germany) Borussia Dortmund	1–2	28,130	1–3	34,000	2–5

=== 1975–76 Cup Winners' Cup ===
Winners of the 1975 FA Cup, West Ham – now managed by John Lyall – again entered the Cup Winners' Cup, eventually losing in the final to Anderlecht.

West Ham started this campaign with an away game against Finnish side, Lahden Reipas. The match was played in the Helsinki Olympic Stadium in front of a crowd of just 4,587. Lahden Reipas took the lead in the fourth minute through Harri Lindholm after his shot had hit West Ham goalkeeper Mervyn Day in the chest and gone in. Trevor Brooking equalized in the 58th minute with a free-kick only for the home side to take the lead in the 55th minute through Ari Tupasela. Billy Bonds scored in the 76th minute to leave the match level going into the second leg. In the return leg in London, West Ham ran out 3–0 winners thanks to goals from Keith Robson, Pat Holland and Billy Jennings.

West Ham's next opponents were Ararat Erevan in Armenia in the Soviet Union. Alan Taylor scored to take the lead only for Erevan's Samvel Petrosyan to head the ball out of Mervyn Day's hands. With the West Ham players expecting the goal to be disallowed, West German referee Hans-Joachim Weyland allowed it, making the game 1–1. In the home leg in London on 5 November, West Ham won 3–1 with goals from Robson, Taylor and Graham Paddon. Erevan's single goal was scored by Nazar Petrosyan.

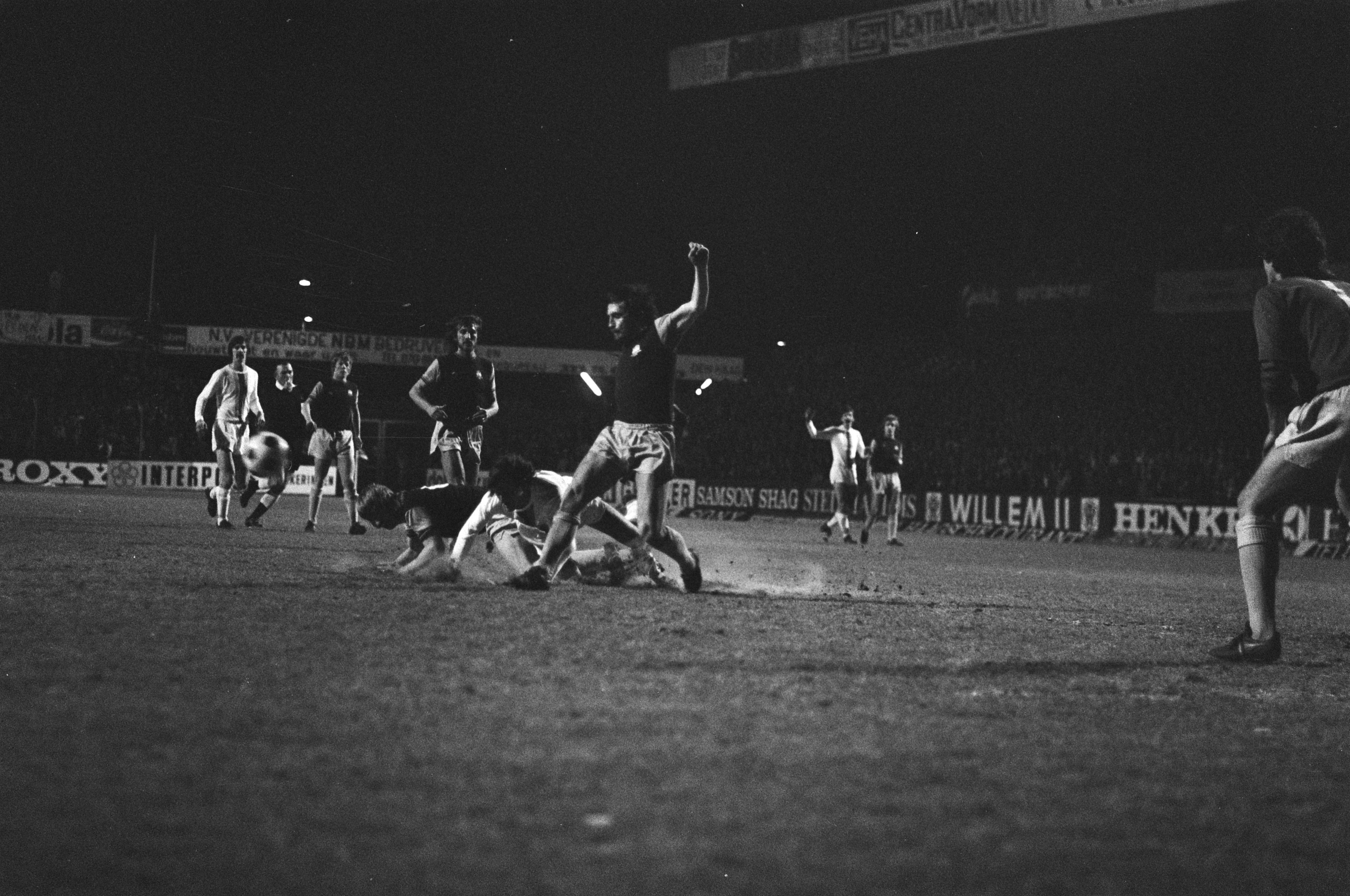
West Ham travelled to FC Den Haag in the Quarter-Finals

In the quarter-finals, West Ham faced Dutch side FC Den Haag. In the first leg in the Netherlands, 1970 World Cup Final referee Rudi Glöckner awarded Den Haag two penalties for handball. Both were scored by Aad Mansveld, who added a third for his hat-trick. Lex Schoenmaker scored their fourth goal with West Ham's two goals coming from Billy Jennings. In the second leg on 13 March 1976, West Ham scored three first-half goals through Alan Taylor, Frank Lampard and Billy Bonds to make the game 5–4 to West Ham. Lex Schoenmaker scored in the 59th minute to tie the game 5–5. West Ham survived a tense last half-hour of the game and went through on the away goals rule.

West German's Eintracht Frankfurt stood between West Ham and a cup final appearance. In the first-leg in West Germany, Frankfurt played their reserve goalkeeper, Peter Kunter, a part-time player who is also a dentist. He was beaten after only nine minutes by Graham Paddon's 30 yards (27 m) shot. Frankfurt scored two goals through Willi Neuberger and Wolfgang Kraus to take a 2–1 lead to London. West Ham won 3–1 in the home leg. Two from Trevor Brooking and one from Keith Robson were enough to give the tie 4–3 to West Ham with a goal for Frankfurt's Klaus Beverungen. Goalkeeper Mervyn Day won particular praise from the manager for his saves in the first half.

The final was played at the Heysel Stadium in Brussels against Anderlecht. Pat Holland opened the scoring in the 29th minute but Frank Lampard's poor back-pass allowed Rob Rensenbrink to equalise. François Van der Elst added another in the 48th minute and although Keith Robson equalized with a header, both man-of-the-match Rensenbrink and Van der Elst scored again to give Anderlecht the trophy.

Season	Competition	Round	Opposition	Home	Attendance	Away	Attendance	Aggregate
1975–76	European Cup Winners' Cup	First round	(Finland) Lahden Reipas	3–0	24,131	2–2	4,587	5–2
1975–76	European Cup Winners' Cup	Second round	(Soviet Union) Ararat Erevan	3–1	30,399	1–1	66,662	4–2
1975–76	European Cup Winners' Cup	Quarter-finals	(Netherlands) FC Den Haag	3–1	29,829	2–4	26,000	5–5(a)
1975–76	European Cup Winners' Cup	Semi-finals	(West Germany) Eintracht Frankfurt	3–1	39,202	1–2	55,000	4–3
1975–76	European Cup Winners' Cup	Final	(Belgium) Anderlecht	2–4			51,296	N/A

=== 1980–81 Cup Winners' Cup ===
Winners of the 1980 FA Cup, West Ham started another European campaign in the Cup Winners' Cup.

Crowd violence marred the first round away leg in the Bernabéu Stadium to Castilla in which one West Ham fan was killed. West Ham were ordered to play the return leg at least 300 kilometres (190 mi) from Upton Park. After an appeal, they were allowed to play at home resulting in the playing of "the Ghost Match" behind closed doors in the return leg at Upton Park with no fans in attendance, resulting in an official attendance of 262, the club's lowest ever figure for a competitive first team match until the COVID-19 pandemic. 3–1 down from the first-leg, West Ham won the second-leg 5–1, with David Cross scoring a hat-trick, West Ham's first ever hat-trick in European competition.

In the second round, West Ham played Romanian side Poli Timișoara. The first-leg in London resulted in a 4–0 win for West Ham. Goals for Billy Bonds, Paul Goddard, a Ray Stewart penalty and another for David Cross gave them a strong lead ahead of the away leg. In Romania, Timișoara won 1–0 after Phil Parkes had let a Dan Păltinișanu shot bounce over his arm.

West Ham lost in the quarter-finals to eventual winners Dinamo Tbilisi. In the first leg in London, West Ham lost 4–1. Tbilisi's performance was described as "one of the finest many fans had seen". They were 2–0 ahead by half-time after goals by Aleksandre Chivadze, Vladimir Gutsaev and although David Cross scored for West Ham, Ramaz Shengelia scored twice for the Soviets. At full-time, Dinamo Tbilisi left the pitch to a standing ovation from the West Ham support. Following the defeat, West Ham manager John Lyall praised Dinamo Tbilisi, saying "If we are eliminated from the competition, I will at least be happy that we lost to such a high class team". Dinamo Tbilisi's manager, Nodar Akhalkatsi, prepared for the second leg in a more conservative fashion, saying "I also want to say that the quarter-finals consist of two matches and we should not expect an easy match in Tbilisi. I greatly appreciate the ability of the English and, in particular, the West Ham players to fight until the last minute". In the away leg in Tbilisi, Dinamo Tbilisi supporters displayed a banner reading "Welcome to the sportsmen of England", reciprocating West Ham's goodwill gesture two weeks prior. West Ham needed to score four goals, which never looked likely. They won 1–0, in the Lenin Stadium, after an 88th-minute goal by Stuart Pearson, losing the tie 4–2 on aggregate.

Season	Competition	Round	Opposition	Home	Attendance	Away	Attendance	Aggregate
1980–81	European Cup Winners' Cup	First round	(Spain) Castilla	5–1	262	1–3	40,000	6–4
1980–81	European Cup Winners' Cup	Second round	(Romania) Poli Timișoara	4–0	27,157	0–1	25,000	4–1
1980–81	European Cup Winners' Cup	Quarter-finals	(Soviet Union) Dinamo Tbilisi	1–4	34,957	1–0	80,000	2–4

=== 1985–91 – English ban from European competition ===
English clubs were banned from taking part in European competition in the aftermath of the Heysel Stadium disaster in 1985. As a result, West Ham, who finished third in the 1985–86 First Division, missed out on a place in the 1986–87 UEFA Cup.

=== 1999 UEFA Intertoto Cup ===
Following their fifth-place finish in the previous season's Premier League, West Ham, now managed by Harry Redknapp, entered the UEFA Intertoto Cup.

Given a bye for the first two rounds, West Ham drew Finnish side Jokerit in the third round. In a poorly-attended first leg at the Boleyn Ground, West Ham won 1–0 with a goal from Paul Kitson. Manager Harry Redknapp blamed a disappointing performance on "midsummer lethargy". In Finland, Jokerit took the lead through Tero Koskela before Frank Lampard Jr. equalized in the 70th minute with a 20-yard free-kick to put West Ham into the next round.

Lampard scored again in the first leg of the semi-finals, against Dutch side Heerenveen. His 25 yards (23 m) shot was enough to give West Ham the lead going into the second leg. 1–0 was also the score in the away leg on 5 August 1999. Following a 30 yards (27 m) Lampard shot which the goalkeeper failed to hold, Paulo Wanchope followed up to score and take West Ham into the final.

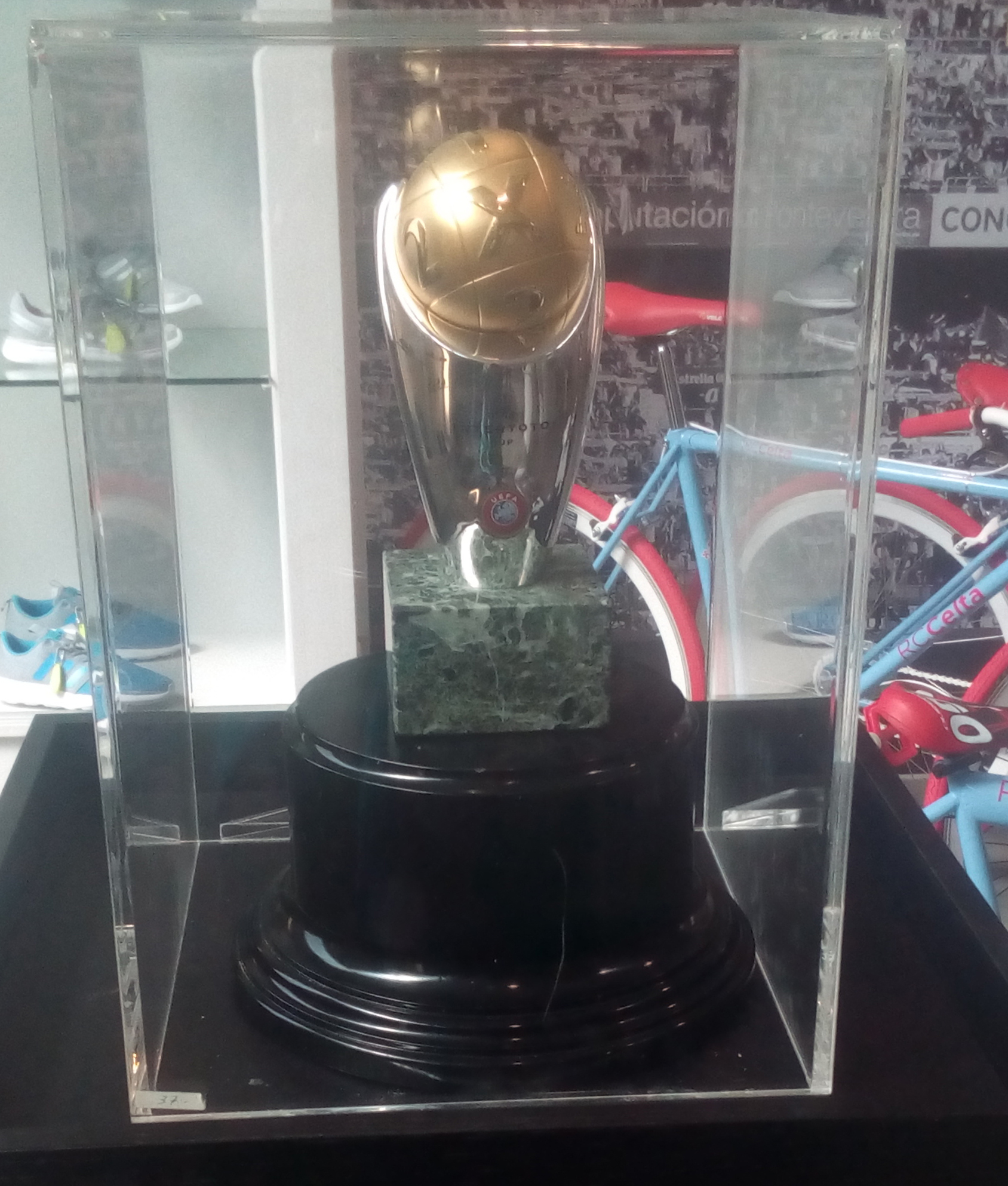
The UEFA Intertoto Cup trophy, won by West Ham in 1999

Following a two-leg final against Metz in which they were 1–0 down from the home leg following a Metz goal from Louis Saha, West Ham won the away leg 1–3 at Saint-Symphorien Stadium with goals by Trevor Sinclair, Frank Lampard and Paulo Wanchope. West Ham therefore qualified for the UEFA Cup as one of the three winners of the competition, alongside Montpellier and Juventus.

Season	Competition	Round	Opposition	Home	Attendance	Away	Attendance	Aggregate
1999	Intertoto Cup	Third round	(Finland) Jokerit	1–0	11,098	1–1	7,667	2–1
1999	Intertoto Cup	Semi-finals	(Netherlands) Heerenveen	1–0	7,485	1–0	13,500	2–0
1999	Intertoto Cup	Final	(France) Metz	0–1	25,372	3–1	19,599	3–2

=== 1999–2000 UEFA Cup ===
As winners of the 1999 Intertoto Cup, West Ham gained entry to the 1999–2000 UEFA Cup, the first time the club had qualified for the UEFA Cup in their history.

In the first round, they beat Croatian side Osijek. They won the home leg 3–0 with goals from Paulo Wanchope, Paolo Di Canio and Frank Lampard Jr. The away leg was a 1–3 West Ham victory, with goals coming from Paul Kitson, Neil Ruddock and Marc-Vivien Foé. Osijek's single goal was scored by Stanko Bubalo.

In the second round, West Ham faced Romanian team Steaua București, going down 2–0 in the first-leg, following goals from Laurențiu Roșu and Sabin Ilie. The return leg at Upton Park ended 0–0 with West Ham being eliminated.

Season	Competition	Round	Opposition	Home	Attendance	Away	Attendance	Aggregate
1999–2000	UEFA Cup	First round	(Croatia) Osijek	3–0	25,331	3–1	15,000	6–1
1999–2000	UEFA Cup	Second round	(Romania) Steaua București	0–0	24,514	0–2	12,500	0–2

=== 2006–07 UEFA Cup ===
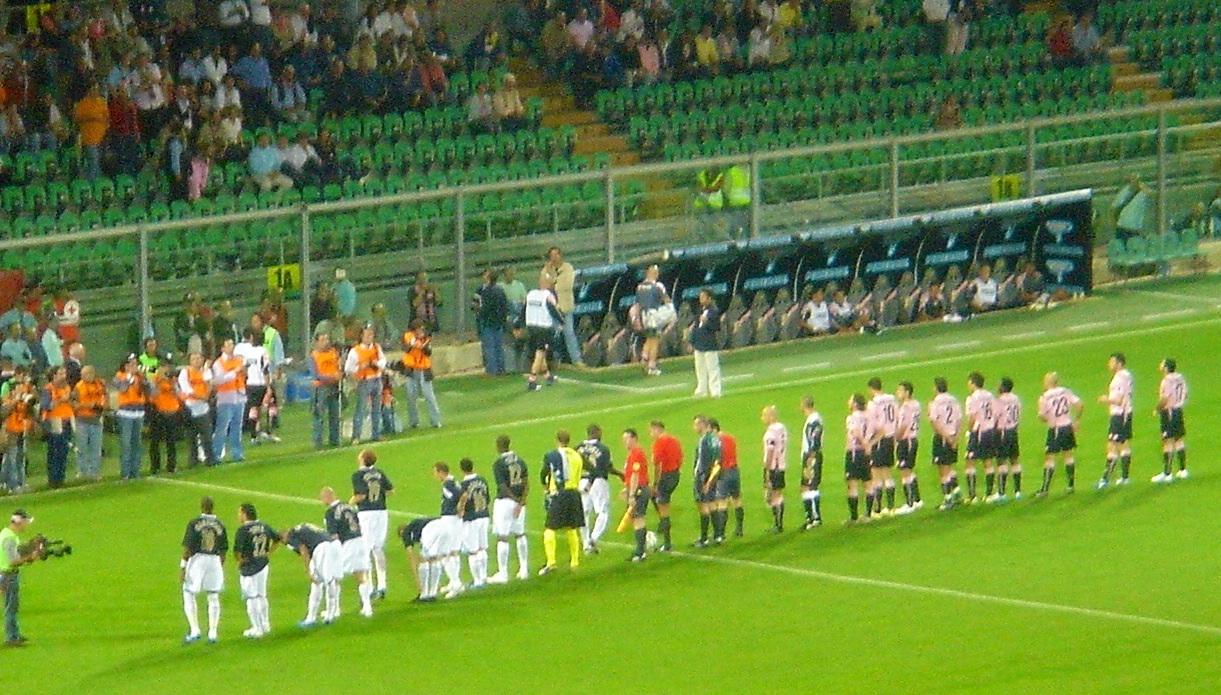
Palermo and West Ham players line-up before the game in Palermo at the Stadio Renzo Barbera

As runners-up in the 2006 FA Cup West Ham, now managed by Alan Pardew, gained entry to the 2006–07 UEFA Cup. Violence involving West Ham supporters was again in evidence. Twenty West Ham fans appeared in an Italian court following their arrest after fights with rival supporters in Sicily before and after West Ham's game against Palermo in the away leg of their 2006–07 UEFA Cup game. At the home leg, fans had bought T-shirts bearing the slogan "the Mafia" – a reference to Sicily being the home of the Cosa Nostra. This was seen as antagonistic by Palermo fans. Six West Ham fans, six police officers and five locals suffered minor injuries in fighting in Sicily. Rival fans threw bottles and chairs in the city's Teatro Massimo district. Five-hundred people were involved in the brawl and police officers were attacked. It took police in riot gear more than an hour to bring the violence under control. An eyewitness said, "West Ham fans behaved like animals, roaming the streets, bottles in hand searching for anyone to fight." More than 2,500 West Ham fans travelled to Palermo for the game.

West Ham lost the tie 4–0 on aggregate losing 0–1 at home to an Andrea Caracciolo goal and 3–0 in Palermo following two goals by Fábio Simplício and one by David Di Michele. Manager Alan Pardew gave full debuts to recent signings and Argentine internationals Javier Mascherano and Carlos Tevez in the games. Pardew had claimed before the games against Palermo that West Ham were in the competition to win it. They exited in the first round.

Season	Competition	Round	Opposition	Home	Attendance	Away	Attendance	Aggregate
2006–07	UEFA Cup	First round	(Italy) Palermo	0–1	32,222	0–3	19,284	0–4

=== 2015–16 Europa League ===
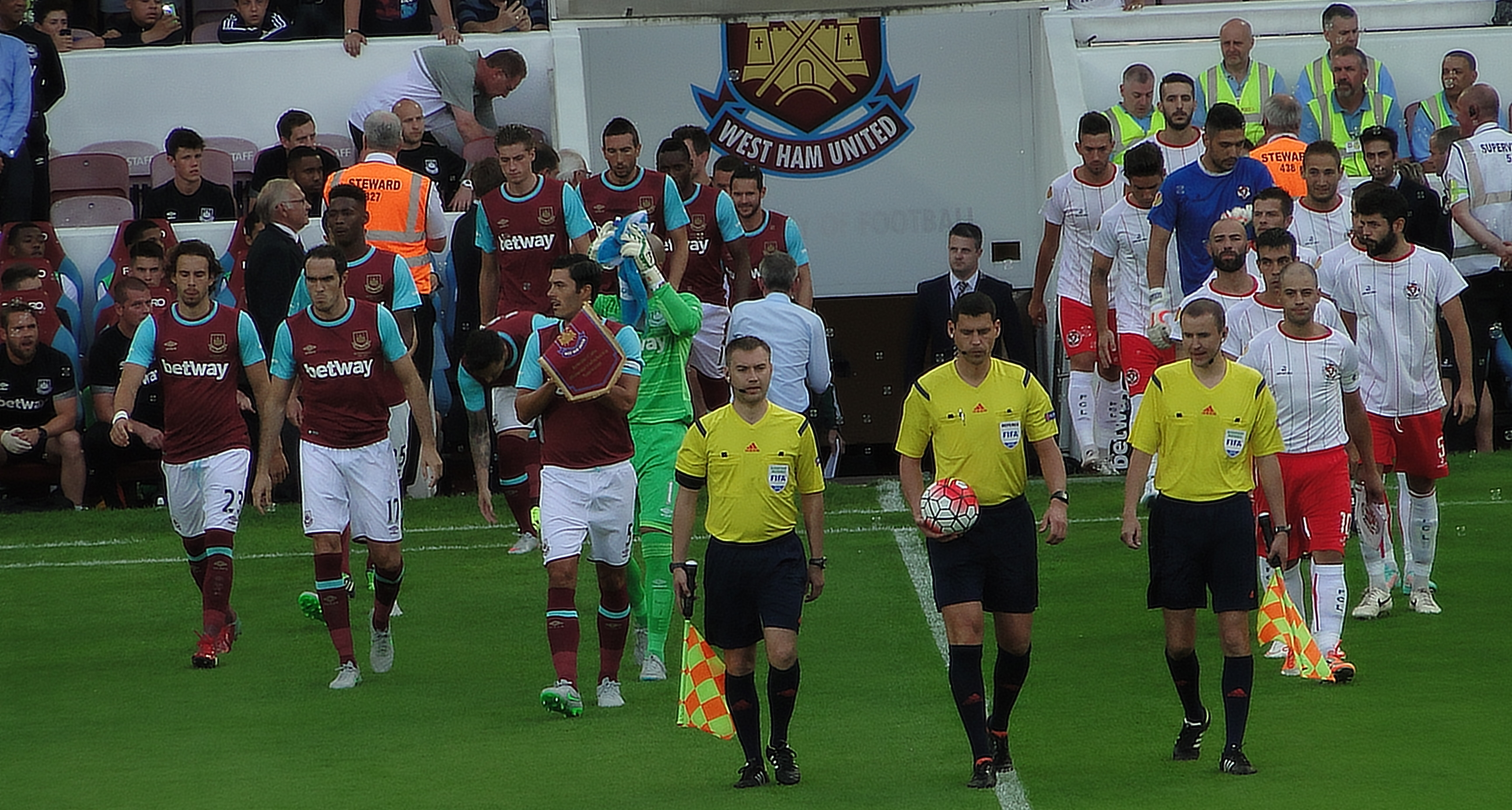
West Ham beat FC Lusitanos in the first qualifying round

By winning the Premier League Fair Play table for 2014–15, West Ham qualified for the 2015–16 UEFA Europa League entering at the first qualifying round.

In the first qualifying round, they were drawn against Andorran team Lusitanos, who qualified for the Europa League after finishing second in the 2014–15 Primera Divisió. Originally scheduled to play the away leg first, as two teams from Andorra were both scheduled to play at home on the same day, the legs were reversed with the home leg at the Boleyn Ground due on 2 July 2015. The second leg, on 9 July, was moved to the 1,300 capacity Estadi Comunal d'Andorra la Vella with West Ham supporters receiving a ticket allocation of 450. West Ham won the first leg 3–0 with two goals from Diafra Sakho and one from captain on the night James Tomkins. In front of a sell-out crowd, development side player and 16-year-old Reece Oxford made his debut to become West Ham's youngest player. There were also debuts for Lewis Page, Josh Cullen and Djair Parfitt-Williams. In the return leg in Andorra on 9 July, West Ham won 0–1. Elliot Lee, on his first start for the club, also scored his first West Ham goal. Sakho was sent-off in the 14th minute for violent conduct and there was a first full start for Josh Cullen and a first team debut for Amos Nasha.

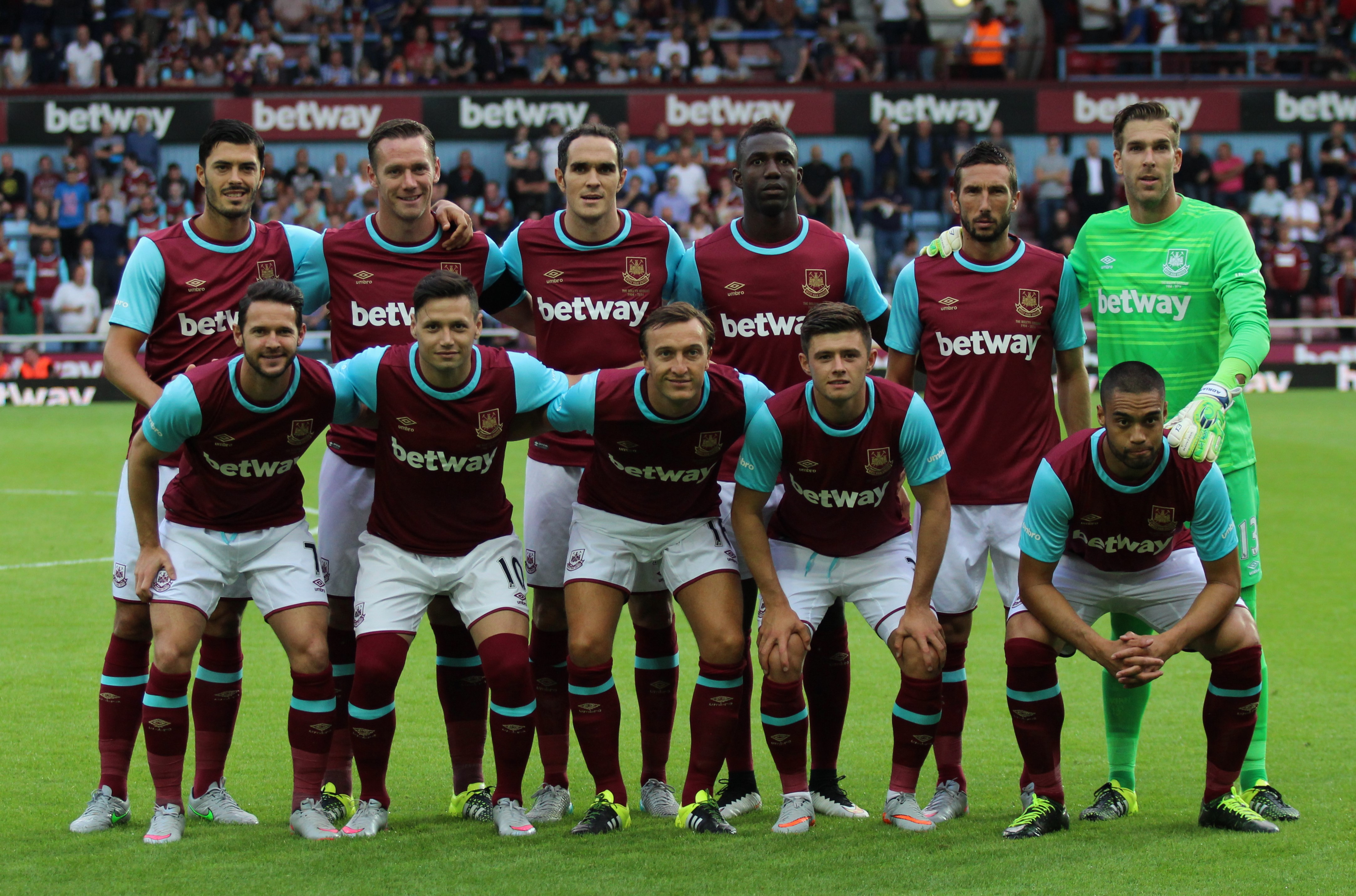
The Hammers side that faced Birkirkara of Malta.

In the second qualifying round, West Ham were drawn against Maltese side Birkirkara, who had beaten Armenian side Ulisses in the first round. Having played with several youth team players in the first leg, manager Slaven Bilić brought in more first-team players for the second round, including captain Kevin Nolan, Mark Noble, Winston Reid and Aaron Cresswell. Although they dominated possession, West Ham had to wait until a 90th-minute goal by James Tomkins gave them the victory. There was a debut in the game for recent signing from Manchester City, Martin Samuelsen. West Ham struggled in the away leg, losing 0–1 to a goal by Fabrizio Miccoli in the 14th minute. James Tomkins for West Ham and Mauricio Mazzetti for Birkirkara were sent-off. West Ham had only one shot on target as the game went to extra-time having finished 1–1 on aggregate after 90 minutes. They won the tie 5–3 on penalties, with Diego Poyet scoring the decisive penalty.

In the third qualifying round, West Ham drew Romanian side Astra Giurgiu, who had beaten Scottish team Inverness Caledonian Thistle in the previous round. In the first leg on 30 July, West Ham took a 2–0 lead with goals from Enner Valencia and Mauro Zárate before James Collins was sent-off. Fernando Boldrin scored before West Ham's Angelo Ogbonna, on his debut, scored an own goal to make the score 2–2. Manager Slaven Bilić was also sent to the stands after complaining about refereeing decisions. In the second-leg, on 6 August, Julian Dicks took charge of the team with Bilić sitting in the stands. Days away from the start of the Premier League season, 11 changes were made to the side which played in London. There were debuts for Kyle Knoyle, Manuel Lanzini, Doneil Henry, Jordan Brown and Alex Pike. Although Lanzini scored after three minutes, captain Constantin Budescu scored two goals for Astra Giurgiu in four minutes to put the Romanian side 2–1 ahead. With no further scoring, West Ham were eliminated 4–3 on aggregate.

Season	Competition	Round	Opposition	Home	Attendance	Away	Attendance	Aggregate
2015–16	UEFA Europa League	First qualifying round	(Andorra) Lusitanos	3–0	34,966	1–0	837	4–0
2015–16	UEFA Europa League	Second qualifying round	(Malta) Birkirkara	1–0	33,048	0–1	15,257	1–1 (5–3 p.)
2015–16	UEFA Europa League	Third qualifying round	(Romania) Astra Giurgiu	2–2	33,858	1–2	6,300	3–4

=== 2016–17 Europa League ===
West Ham United qualified for the 2016–17 UEFA Europa League on 21 May 2016, following Manchester United's 2–1 victory in the FA Cup final against Crystal Palace. With Manchester United having already secured a place in the competition's group stage with a fifth-placed finish in the 2015–16 Premier League, their cup winners' slot passed to West Ham in seventh.

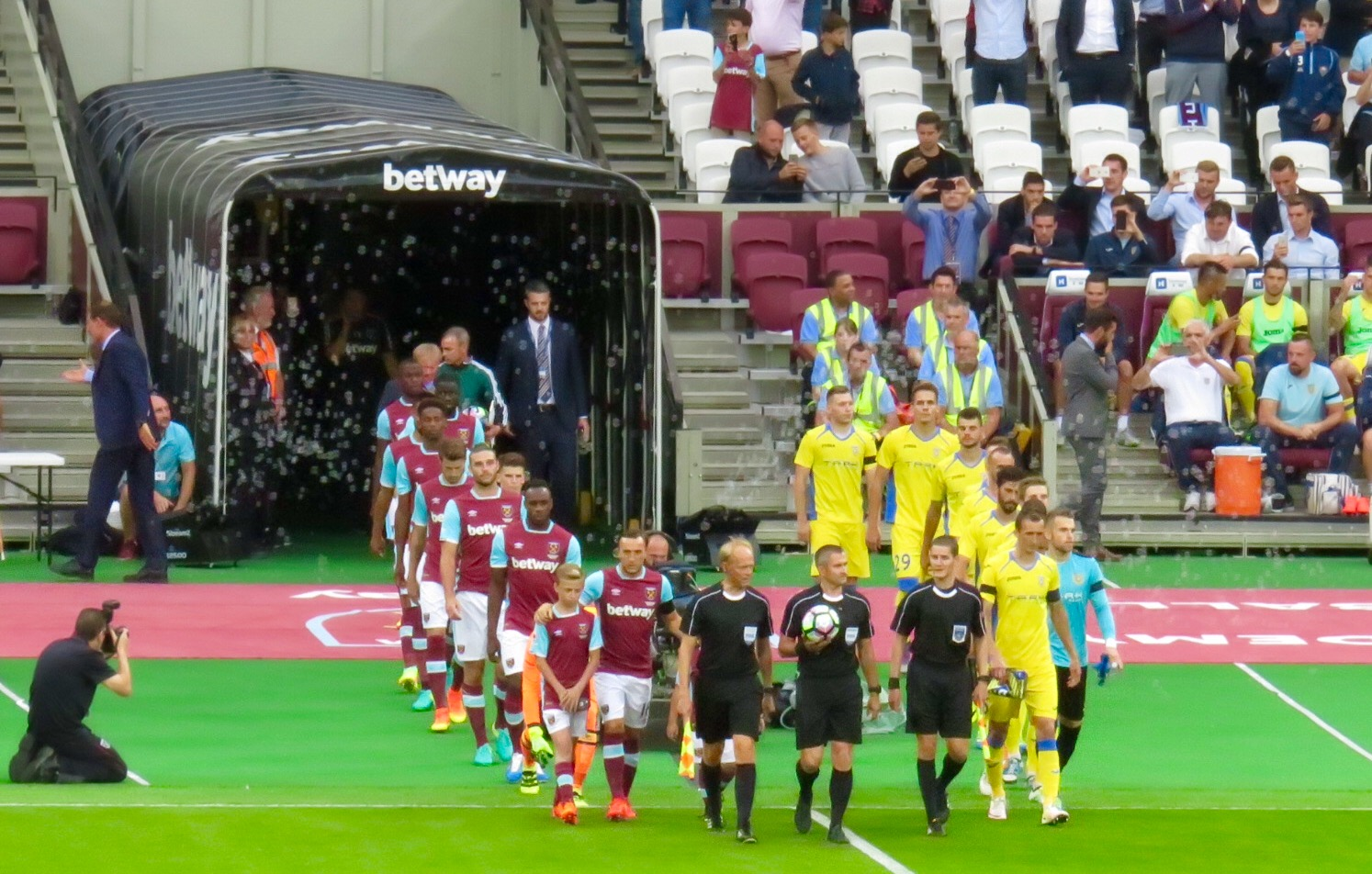
West Ham and NK Domžale entering pitch at the London Stadium

The draw for the third qualifying round was made on 15 July 2016, with West Ham being drawn against Domžale of Slovenia, after they defeated Shakhtyor Soligorsk from Belarus in the second qualifying round. West Ham were originally drawn to play the first leg at their new home, the London Stadium, but due to a clash with the Anniversary Games, the club received permission from UEFA to reverse the order of the legs. The away leg was switched from Domžale's Sports Park ground, to the 16,038 capacity Stožice Stadium in Ljubljana, home of the Slovenia national team. West Ham lost the first leg away in Slovenia on 28 July, with Matic Črnic scoring a penalty in the 11th minute after a handball by debutant Håvard Nordtveit, only for Mark Noble to equalize from the penalty-spot seven minutes later, after Winston Reid was fouled by Domžale's goalkeeper Axel Maraval. Črnic scored a second goal three minutes into the second half to give the Slovenians a 2–1 victory. Seven days later, West Ham hosted Domžale in the club's first ever game in their new home, the London Stadium. West Ham won 3–0 with two goals from Cheikhou Kouyaté and a third from Sofiane Feghouli, resulting in a 4–2 aggregate victory to progress to the play-off round.

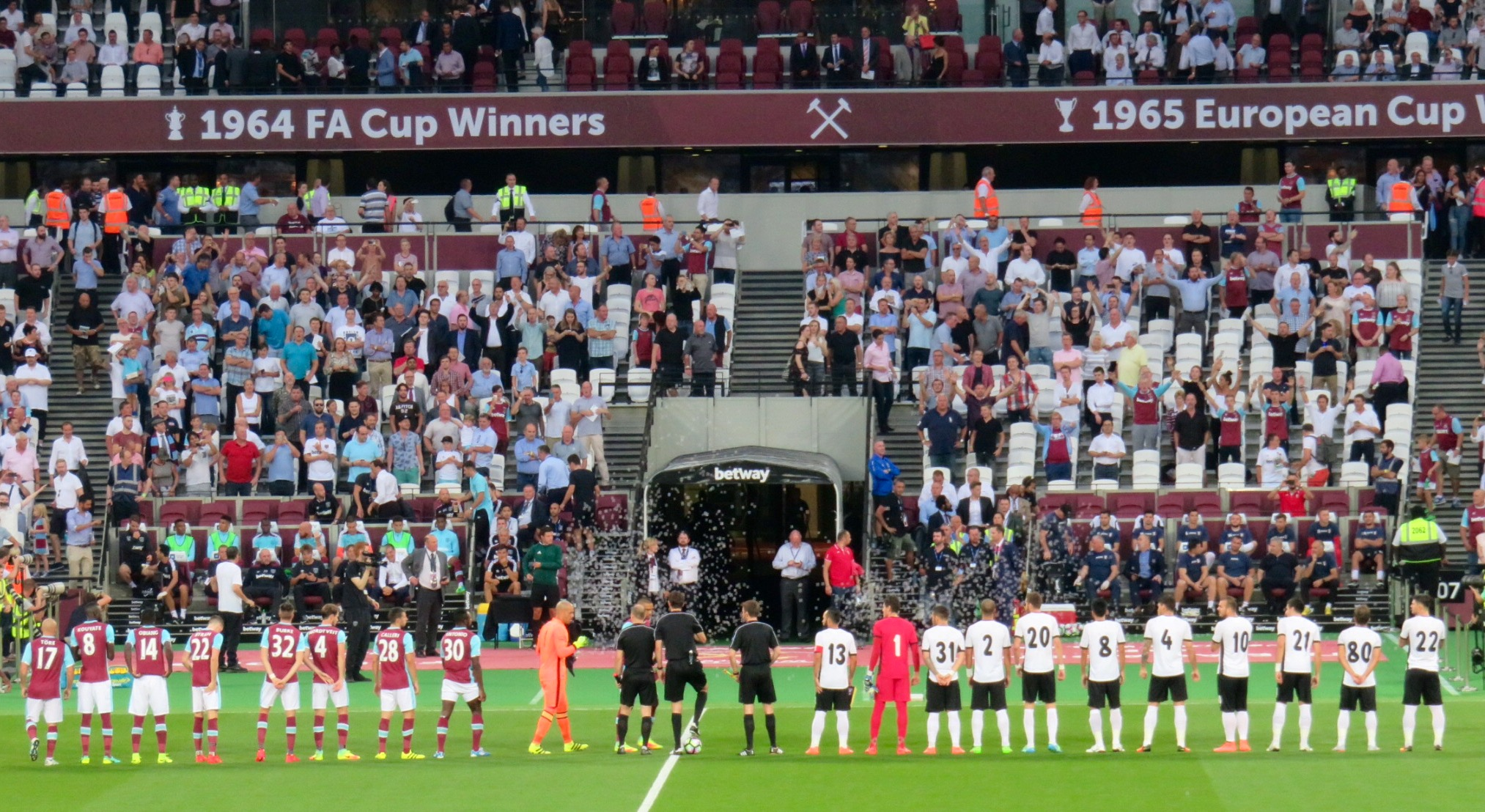
West Ham and FC Astra Giurgiu line-up before their game at the London Stadium

On 5 August, West Ham were drawn to play Romanian Liga I champions Astra Giurgiu in the play-off round. Astra eliminated West Ham from the same competition 12 months earlier in the third qualifying round 3–4 on aggregate, and became the first side West Ham have drawn twice in European football. The first leg took place on 18 August at Stadionul Marin Anastasovici in Giurgiu, with the game finishing in a 1–1 draw. Mark Noble had given West Ham the lead just before half-time with a penalty, after a handball by Cristian Săpunaru. Astra equalised seven minutes from time, when Denis Alibec turned James Collins to score. There were debuts for new signing Jonathan Calleri and academy graduate Marcus Browne. On 25 August, West Ham lost the home leg 0–1, with Astra's Filipe Teixeira scoring the only goal of the game in the 44th minute. West Ham exited the competition for the second year running to the Romanian side.

Season	Competition	Round	Opposition	Home	Attendance	Away	Attendance	Aggregate
2016–17	UEFA Europa League	Third qualifying round	(Slovenia) Domžale	3–0	53,914	1–2	8,458	4–2
2016–17	UEFA Europa League	Play-off round	(Romania) Astra Giurgiu	0–1	56,932	1–1	3,360	1–2

=== 2021–22 Europa League ===
West Ham United automatically qualified for the 2021–22 UEFA Europa League on the final day of the 2020–21 Premier League season, after finishing in sixth place in the table. This represented the first time the club has played in the Europa League proper, as their previous appearances had resulted in being knocked out in the qualifying stages.

The draw for the group stage was made on 27 August 2021, by Andrés Palop and Marcos Senna. West Ham were placed into Group H, with Dinamo Zagreb, Genk and Rapid Wien. On 6 September 2021, UEFA announced away supporters were permitted in the competition, following the majority of the competition in the previous season being played behind closed doors due to the COVID-19 pandemic.

West Ham began their Europa League campaign with an away fixture against Dinamo Zagreb on 15 September. They won the game 2–0 with goals from Michail Antonio and captain for the game, Declan Rice who was making his 150th appearance for West Ham.

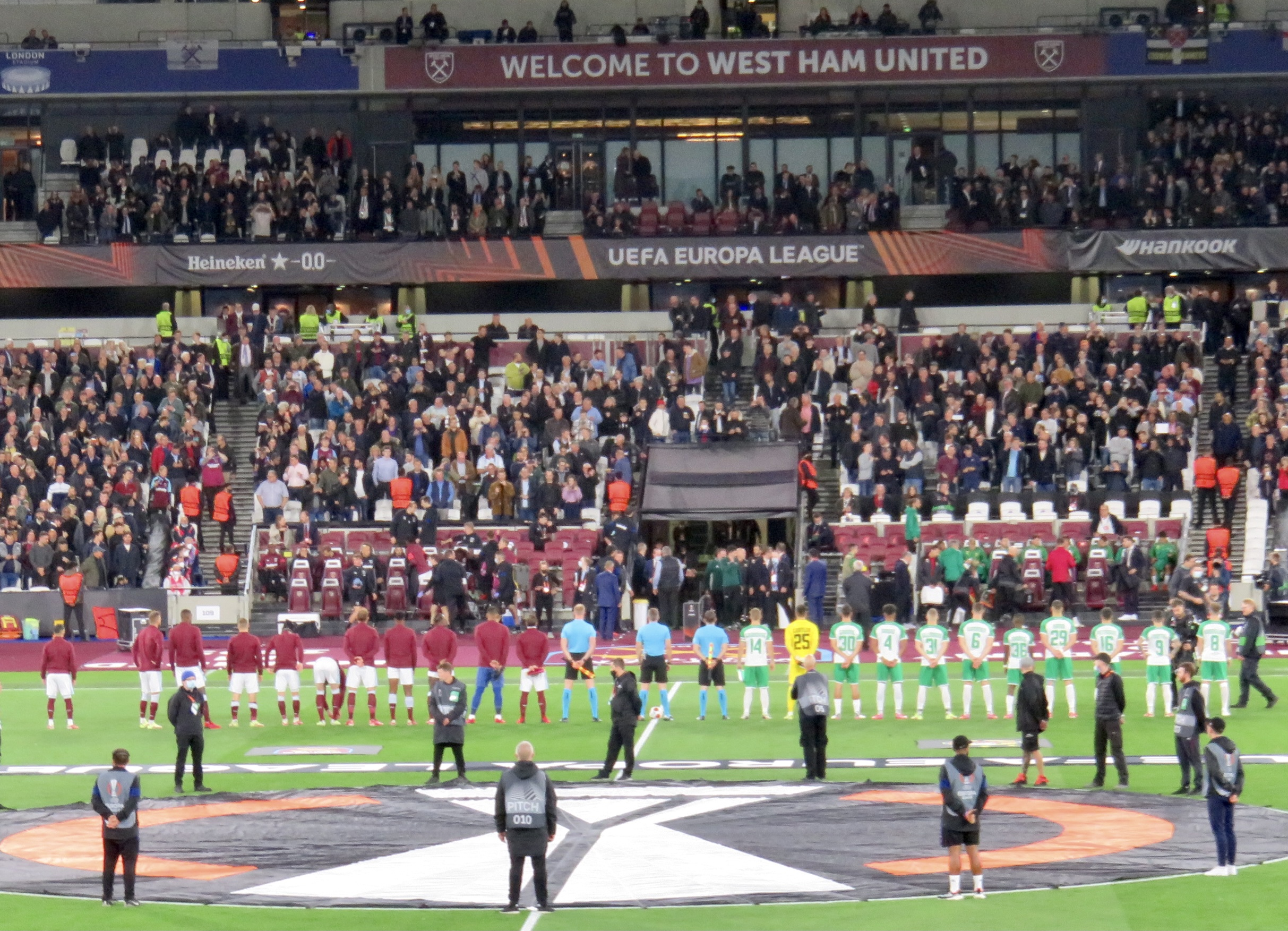
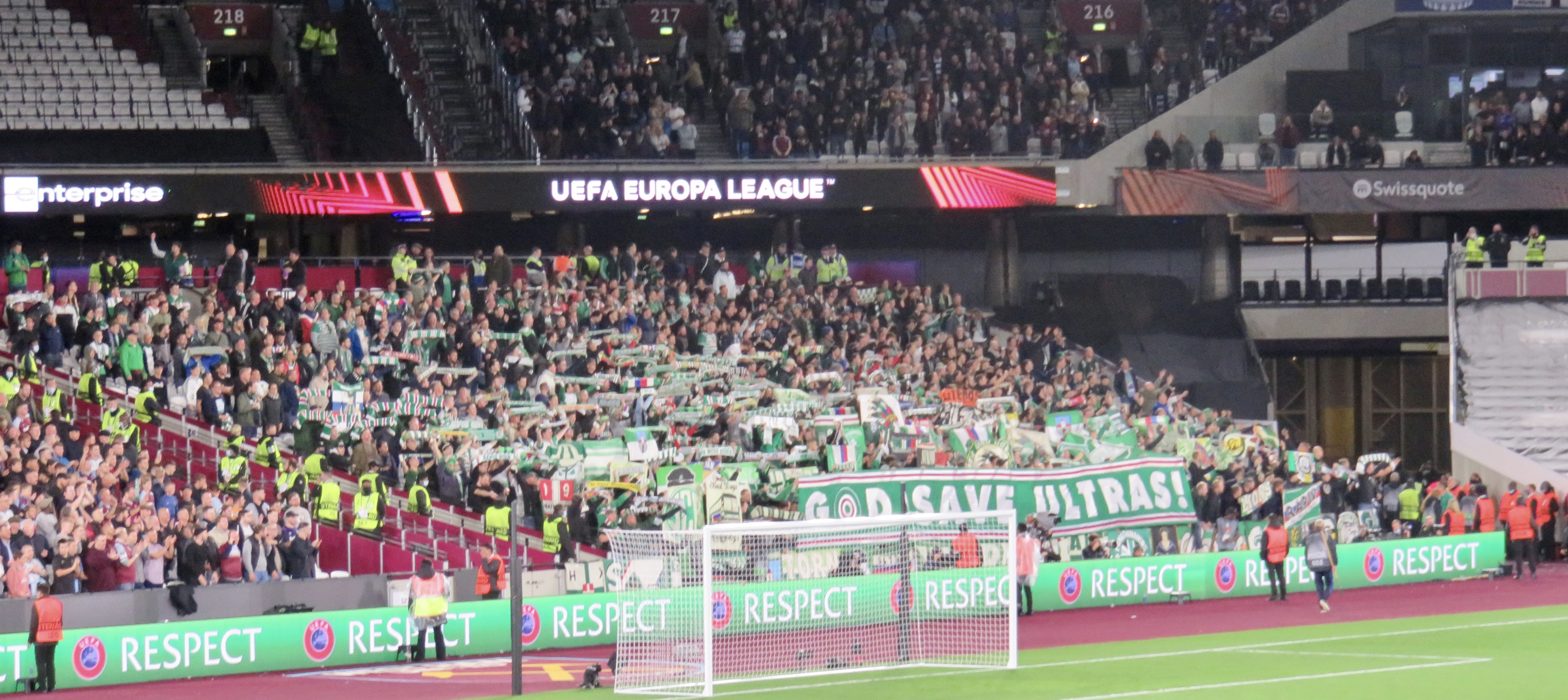
Players of West Ham United and Rapid Vienna and Rapid Vienna supporters before the game

Their opening home game of the campaign came on 30 September to Rapid Wien. West Ham won the game 2–0 with goals from Declan Rice and Saïd Benrahma. Crowd violence marred the game, particularly after Rice's goal in the 29th minute, when Rapid Vienna fans jumped the barriers around the away supporters and objects were thrown between both sets of supporters. The following month, West Ham were fined €60,000 by UEFA for the crowd trouble.

Their third game in the group stage was against Belgian team, Genk. West Ham won 3–0 with goals from Craig Dawson, Issa Diop and Jarrod Bowen. Academy player Dan Chesters also made his professional debut in the game. West Ham conceded their first goals of the competition in the fourth group stage game.

Playing the away leg in Genk, Joseph Paintsil scored for the Belgians in the 4th minute before two goals by Saïd Benrahma put West Ham in the lead. Tomáš Souček scored an own-goal as the game finished 2–2. It was manager David Moyes' 1,000th game as a manager as West Ham qualified for the knock-out stage of the competition.

Following crowd disturbances in this game West Ham were banned from selling tickets to their supporters for the away fixture by UEFA, against Rapid Vienna on 25 November. They were also fined €30,000 and another €4,500 for the throwing of objects by supporters. The match was ultimately played without supporters present due to COVID-19 restrictions in Austria. West Ham won the game 2–0 qualifying for the knockout phase as group winners. Goals were scored by Andriy Yarmolenko and a penalty from Mark Noble. 17-year-old Sonny Perkins made his professional debut in the second-half.

For their final game of the group stage, at home to Dinamo Zagreb, with West Ham already qualified for the next stage, they fielded a team of mostly youth team and first team squad fringe players. They lost 1–0 to a 3rd-minute goal from Mislav Oršić as Freddie Potts and Keenan Forson made their professional debuts.

In the Round of 16 West Ham were drawn against Sevilla with the first leg to be played in Spain on 10 March 2022. The night before the game, violence broke out between West Ham supporters and followers of Eintracht Frankfurt who were in the city for a Europa League game against Real Betis. West Ham lost the first leg game 1–0 with Sevilla's goal being scored by Munir.

A week later, West Ham won the second leg 2–0, in front of West Ham's biggest ever home support, thanks to a 39th-minute header from Tomáš Souček and a 112th-minute goal from Andriy Yarmolenko in extra time, Yarmolenko's second goal in as many games since returning to the West Ham side after being granted compassionate leave due to the Russian invasion of Ukraine.

West Ham were drawn against French club Lyon in the quarter-finals, West Ham's first European quarter-final since 1981, with the winners of the tie drawn to play either Eintracht Frankfurt or Barcelona in the semi-finals. In the first leg game against Lyon on 7 April, West Ham drew 1–1. After Aaron Cresswell was sent-off just before half-time, West Ham played the whole of the second-half with 10 players. However, Jarrod Bowen scored in the 52nd minute only to see the lead cancelled out by a goal for Lyon in the 66th minute by on-loan Tottenham midfielder Tanguy Ndombele.

The second leg was played at Lyon's Parc Olympique Lyonnais stadium on 14 April. West Ham won the game 3–0. Craig Dawson scored the first goal in the 38th minute with a near-post header. Declan Rice added a second with a deflected shot six minutes later. Jarrod Bowen scored the third three minutes into the second-half. Running out 4–1 winners on aggregate, West Ham progressed to their first European semi-final in 46 years, playing the same opposition as they defeated in the 1975–76 European Cup Winners' Cup semi-finals, Eintracht Frankfurt, after Frankfurt's 4–3 aggregate win against Barcelona.

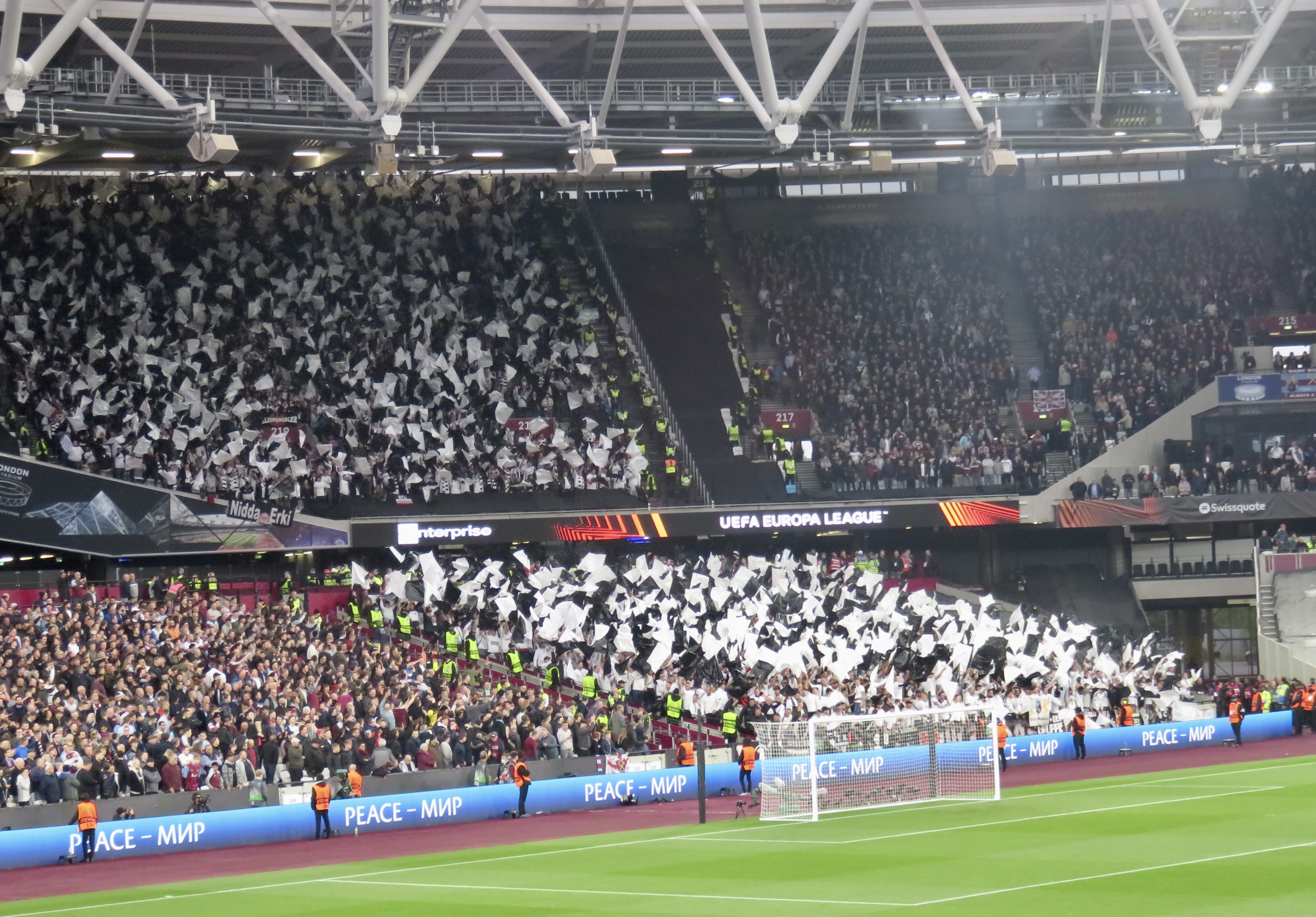
Eintracht Frankfurt supporters at the London Stadium before the first leg of the semi-final

West Ham lost the first leg of the semi-final, played on 28 April at the London Stadium, Frankfurt scored inside the first minute with a goal by Ansgar Knauff. Michail Antonio equalised in the 21st minute only for Daichi Kamada to score a winning goal in the 54th minute.

In the second-leg on 5 May, West Ham were eliminated from the competition after losing 1–0, resulting in a 3–1 aggregate loss. Aaron Cresswell was sent-off in the 19th minute and Frankfurt scored the only goal on the night in the 26th minute, with Rafael Borré scoring from Ansgar Knauff's cut-back. Manager David Moyes was also sent-off late in the game for kicking the ball at a ball-boy. In June 2022, Moyes was banned for one game while captain, Declan Rice was banned for two games after accusing the referee in the second leg, Jesus Gil Manzano of corruption.

Season	Competition	Round	Opposition	Home	Attendance	Away	Attendance	Aggregate
2021–22	UEFA Europa League	Group H	(Croatia) Dinamo Zagreb	0–1	49,401	2–0	12,344	1st
2021–22	UEFA Europa League	Group H	(Belgium) Genk	3–0	45,980	2–2	12,239	1st
2021–22	UEFA Europa League	Group H	(Austria) Rapid Wien	2–0	50,004	2–0	0	1st
2021–22	UEFA Europa League	Knockout round play-off	Bye					
2021–22	UEFA Europa League	Round of 16	(Spain) Sevilla	2–0 (a.e.t.)	59,981	0–1	34,728	2–1
2021–22	UEFA Europa League	Quarter-finals	(France) Lyon	1–1	59,978	3–0	50,065	4–1
2021–22	UEFA Europa League	Semi-finals	(Germany) Eintracht Frankfurt	1–2	58,108	0–1	48,000	1–3

=== 2022–23 Europa Conference League ===
By finishing seventh in the 2021–22 Premier League, West Ham qualified for the 2022–23 Europa Conference League entering at the play-off stage. Entering the competition in the play-off qualification round, they were drawn against Viborg of Denmark, who defeated B36 Tórshavn of the Faroe Islands. The first leg was played on 18 August at the London Stadium. West Ham won 3–1 with goals from Gianluca Scamacca, his first for the club, Jarrod Bowen and Michail Antonio. Jakob Bonde scored for Viborg. West Ham then travelled to Denmark for the second leg of their Conference League play-off against Viborg on 25 August. Gianluca Scamacca opened the scoring in the first half, whilst Saïd Benrahma and Tomáš Souček added to the scoreline in the second. The game finished 3–0, with an aggregate scoreline of 6–1, as West Ham qualified comfortably for the group stage.

West Ham began their group stage campaign on 8 September against Romanian team FCSB at the London Stadium winning the game 3–1. FCSB's Andrei Cordea scored in the first-half but second-half goals from Jarrod Bowen, a penalty, Emerson, his first for the club, and Michail Antonio put West Ham top of Group B after the first round of matches. The game contained multiple tributes to Queen Elizabeth II, whose death had been announced earlier that day. On 15 September, West Ham played their second group stage game, away to Danish team Silkeborg. They conceded in the fifth minute when Kasper Kusk scored. The Hammers then replied with a penalty by Manuel Lanzini after Maxwel Cornet was fouled, a goal from Gianluca Scamacca and a header by Craig Dawson. Søren Tengstedt scored in the 75th minute and the game ended 3–2 to West Ham. On 6 October, West Ham travelled to Belgium to face Anderlecht. The game finished 1–0 to West Ham, the only goal being scored by Gianlucca Scamacca in the 79th minute. The Hammers officially sealed their place in the Conference League knockout stages on 13 October with a 2–1 win over Anderlecht. Saïd Benrahma scored a free-kick from 20 yards (18 m) in the 14th minute before Jarrod Bowen scored in the 30th minute. Bowen's goal took him level with Johnny Byrne and David Cross on six European goals. Sebastiano Esposito pulled one back for the Belgians via a penalty in the 89th minute. The game was marred by crowd behaviour during the latter stages as seats were thrown and flares set-off amongst the Anderlecht fans and thrown when Anderlecht scored their penalty. Four police officers were injured following clashes with Anderlecht fans. One officer was struck on the head by a chair and another suffered a suspected broken wrist. A man was arrested for the alleged assault of an officer and 13 were arrested for other offences during the game. On 15 October three Anderlecht supporters were convicted of offences at Croydon Magistrates’ court with one being sentenced to eight weeks in prison for an assault on an emergency worker. On 21 October, Anderlecht were fined €50,000 and banned from selling tickets to travelling fans for two European matches following the crowd trouble. The second match of the ban was suspended for two years. UEFA also ordered Anderlecht to pay for damage to 86 seats and the stadium toilets in the away section at the London Stadium. On 27 October, West Ham qualified for the knockout-phase after beating Silkeborg 1–0 at the London Stadium. The only goal, a penalty, was scored by Manuel Lanzini after Michail Antonio had been fouled by Silkeborg's goalkeeper, Nicolai Larsen.

On 3 November, West Ham became the first side to progress from the UEFA Europa Conference League group stage with a 100% record as they beat FCSB 3–0 in Bucharest. The game featured several Academy players and the professional debuts of Oliver Scarles, Divin Mubama, Kaelan Casey and Kamarai Simon-Swyer. The goals came with a brace from Pablo Fornals and an own goal by FCSB's Joyskim Dawa who diverted Mubama's header into his own net.

==== Round of 16 ====
In the Round of 16, West Ham were drawn against Cypriot team, AEK Larnaca, the first time the club had been drawn against a team from Cyprus. On 9 March, West Ham won the first leg, in Larnaca by 2–0 with two goals by Michail Antonio. The return leg, at the London Stadium on 16 March, was won 4–0 by West Ham. Their goals were scored by Gianluca Scamacca, two from Jarrod Bowen and a debut professional goal from Divin Mubama. Larnaca player Luís Gustavo Ledes was sent-off just before half-time for a foul on Pablo Fornals.

==== Quarter-finals ====
The draw for the quarter-finals was announced on 17 March, with West Ham facing Belgian club KAA Gent. Gent, under their former guise of La Gantoise, were the opposition for West Ham's first competitive game in European football in the 1964–65 European Cup Winners' Cup. The draw for the semi-finals of the competition were also conducted at UEFA's headquarters in Nyon, Switzerland, with the winners of the tie drawn to play the victors of the tie between AZ Alkmaar and Anderlecht. The first leg, played on 13 April, in Belgium finished 1–1; West Ham scored just before half-time with a tap-in by Danny Ings from a cross by Jarrod Bowen. Gent equalised in the 56th with a goal from Hugo Cuypers. The second leg of the quarter-finals was at home in the London Stadium on 20 April; West Ham won 4–1, resulting in an aggregate score of 5–2 earning a place in the Europa Conference Semi-finals. Gent took the lead in the 26th minute through Hugo Cuypers with West Ham equalised in the 37th minute through Michail Antonio. West Ham added three goals in the second half through a Lucas Paquetá penalty, a third by Declan Rice described as "brilliant" and a second for Michail Antonio.

==== Semi-finals ====
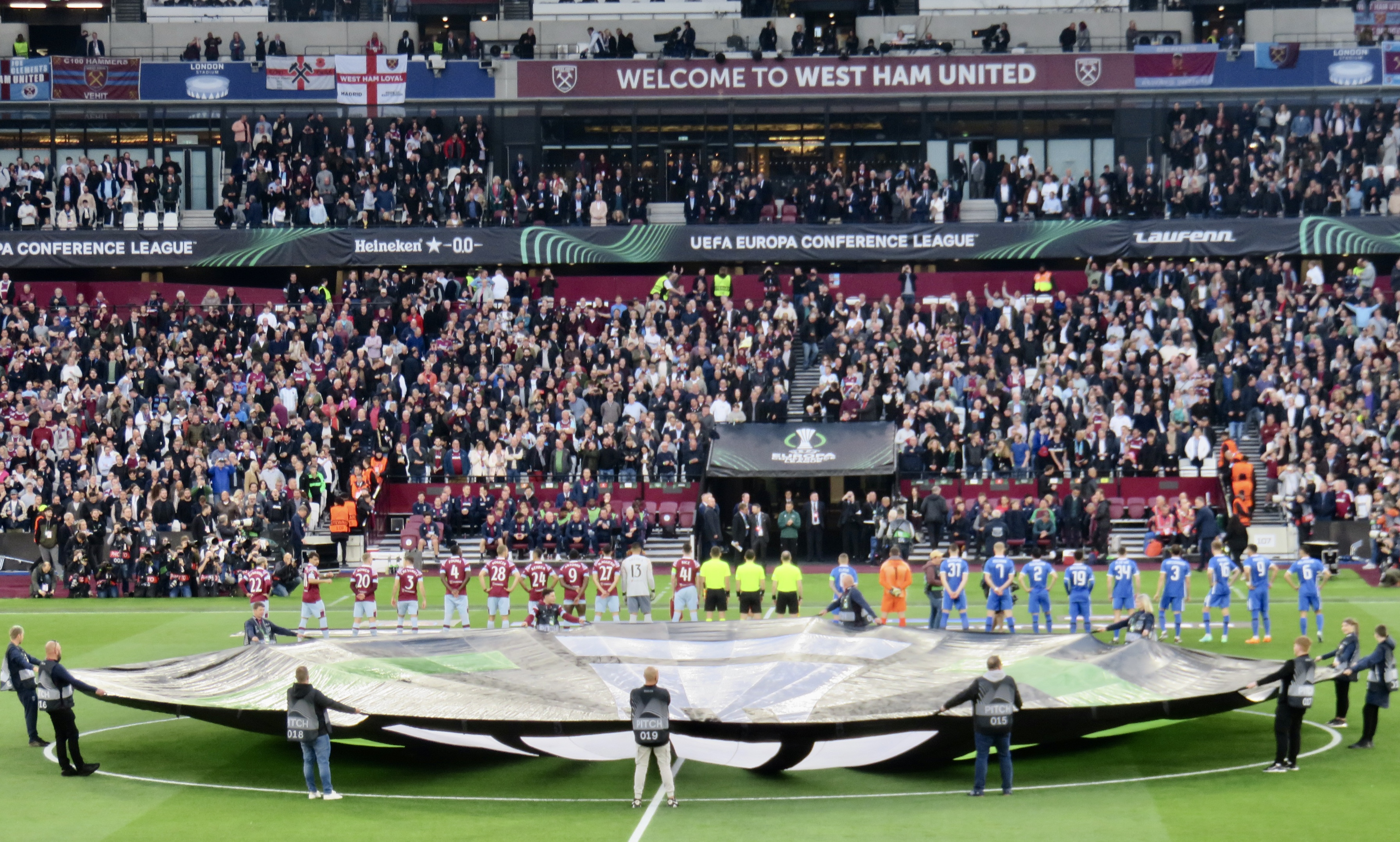
West Ham and AZ Alkmaar line-up before their semi-final

In the semi-finals, West Ham were drawn against Dutch team, AZ Alkmaar. Playing the first leg at the London Stadium, West Ham won 2–1. Alkmaar scored first through Tijjani Reijnders in the first half. In the second half, Saïd Benrahma scored a penalty after Alkmaar goalkeeper, Mat Ryan had punched Jarrod Bowen in the face attempting to clear a corner in the 67th minute and Michail Antonio scored a second from close range eight minutes later prodding in after Nayef Aguerd's header had been blocked by Alkmaar's Yukinari Sugawara.

On 18 May, West Ham played the second leg of their Conference League semi-final against AZ Alkmaar. The Hammers won 1–0 in Alkmaar, with an aggregate score of 3–1. Substitute Pablo Fornals scored the only goal, in added time, to send West Ham to their first European final since the European Cup Winners' Cup final in May 1976. After the game, captain Declan Rice said of Fornals, "his name is going to be written into West Ham history forever."

After the game some Alkmaar supporters attacked an area in which the friends and family of West Ham players were watching the semi-final. Michail Antonio, Said Benrahma, Aaron Cresswell and Flynn Downes and others tried to intervene to stop the violence. A statement issued later by AZ Alkmaar apologised for the behaviour of some of the club's supporters calling the violence "a night to reflect on with shame". The club later issued stadium banning orders against 43 supporters involved in the crowd disturbances. In July 2023, UEFA fined Alkmaar £68,670, £6,115 for throwing objects, £12,870 for lighting fireworks, £6,867 for blocking public passageways and £42,918 for crowd disturbances and failure to ensure that spectators could not move from one sector to another.

==== Final ====
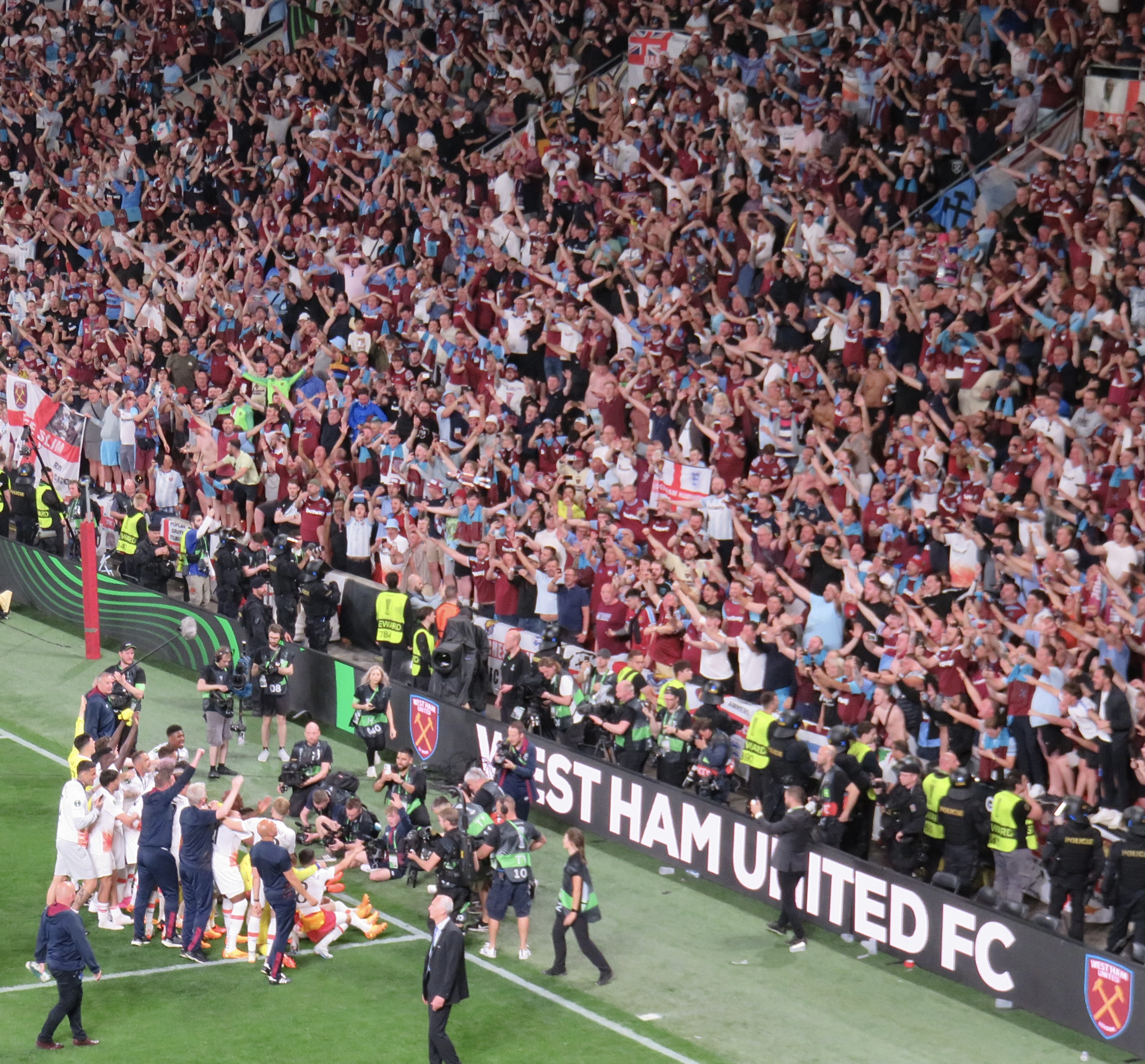
West Ham players, staff and supporters celebrate their Europa Conference League final win.

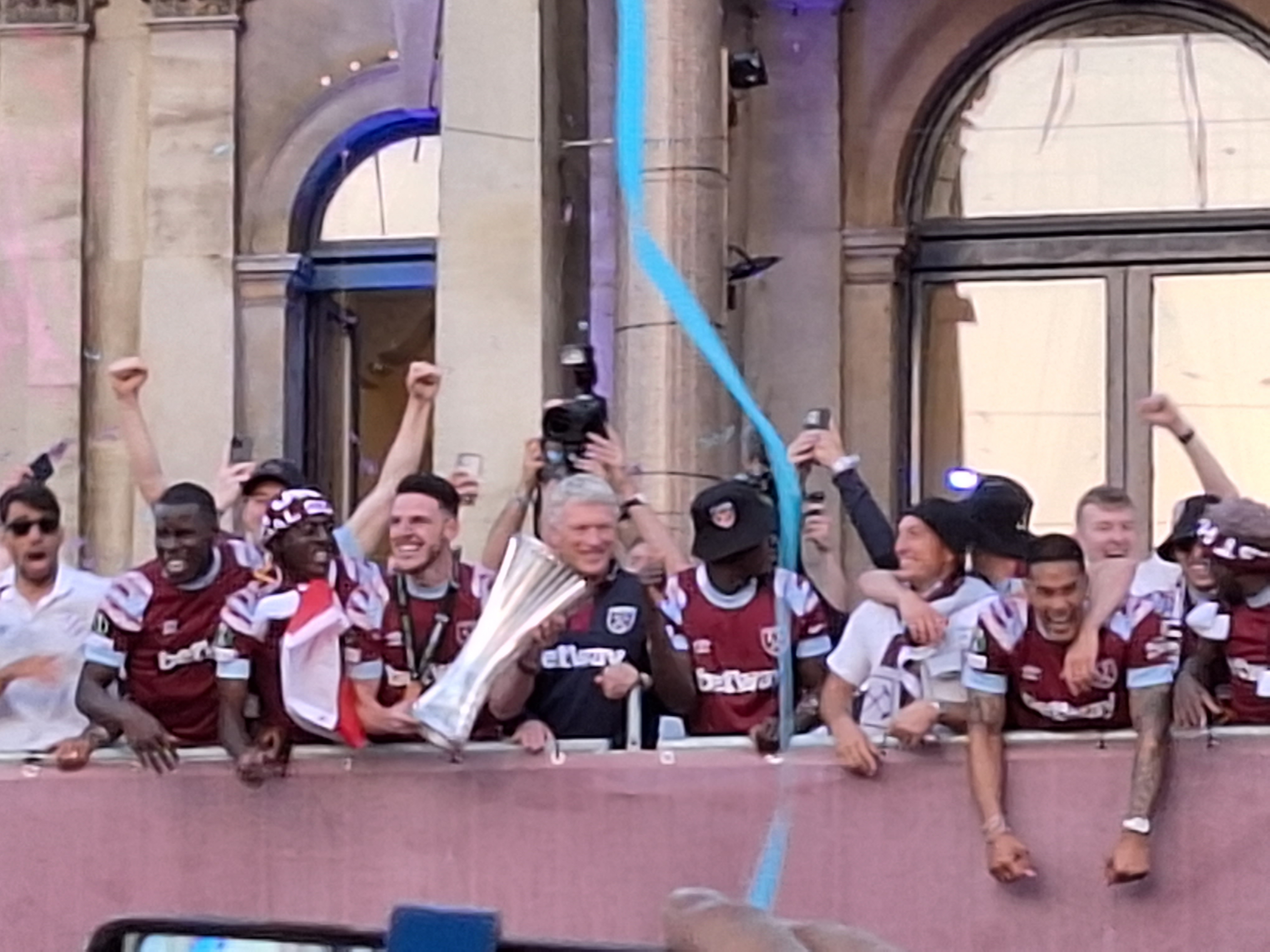
Declan Rice and David Moyes with the UEFA Europa Conference League trophy at Stratford Town Hall, 8 June 2023

West Ham were paired against Italian team, Fiorentina in the final to take place at the Fortuna Arena in Prague, Czech Republic on 7 June 2023.

West Ham won the UEFA Europa Conference League final against Fiorentina at the Fortuna Arena in Prague. The game remained goalless until referee Carlos del Cerro Grande awarded the Hammers a penalty in the second half after the ball hit the hand of Fiorentina captain Cristiano Biraghi after a long throw into the box. Saïd Benrahma converted the penalty to put the Hammers ahead in the 62nd minute until just five minutes later when Giacomo Bonaventura shot the ball past Alphonse Areola and into the bottom left corner to level the game for Fiorentina. The match remained drawn until the 90th minute when Lucas Paquetá intercepted a pass in midfield and passed the ball through to Jarrod Bowen, who scored past Fiorentina goalkeeper Pietro Terracciano to reclaim West Ham's lead and secure the Conference League trophy. It was West Ham's first trophy since they won the FA Cup in 1980, when they beat Arsenal in the final, and their first European final since the European Cup Winners' Cup in 1976, when they lost to Anderlecht in the final. Jarrod Bowen was named Player of the Match for the final, whilst captain Declan Rice was declared Conference League Player of the Season by UEFA's Technical Observer panel.

After the game Fiorentina president, Rocco Commisso described West Ham as treating Fiorentina players "like animals" after Luka Jović came off at half-time with a broken nose and Cristiano Biraghi received a bloodied face after being hit by an object thrown from the crowd. UEFA later charged both clubs with "throwing of objects" with West Ham being charged with "invasion of the field of play" and Fiorentina being charged with the "lighting of fireworks". West Ham supporters were banned from attending the club's first away fixture of their 2023-24 Europa League campaign. The club was also fined €50,000 after supporters threw objects onto the pitch and a further €8,000 for a pitch invasion following the game. Fiorentina were given a one-match ban for away supporters and were fined €30,000.

On 8 June thousands lined a route from the Champions Statue to Stratford Town Hall as West Ham players took part in an open top bus parade to show the trophy and celebrate the win.

Season	Competition	Round	Opposition	Home	Attendance	Away	Attendance	Aggregate
2022–23	UEFA Europa Conference League	Play-off round	(Denmark) Viborg	3–1	30,230	3–0	8,435	6–1
2022–23	UEFA Europa Conference League	Group B	(Romania) FCSB	3–1	39,536	3–0	20,172	1st
2022–23	UEFA Europa Conference League	Group B	(Belgium) Anderlecht	2–1	40,767	1–0	17,033	1st
2022–23	UEFA Europa Conference League	Group B	(Denmark) Silkeborg	1–0	35,911	3–2	6,702	1st
2022–23	UEFA Europa Conference League	Knockout round play-off	Bye					
2022–23	UEFA Europa Conference League	Round of 16	(Cyprus) AEK Larnaca	4–0	40,482	2–0	6,654	6–0
2022–23	UEFA Europa Conference League	Quarter-finals	(Belgium) Gent	4–1	53,475	1–1	19,037	5–2
2022–23	UEFA Europa Conference League	Semi-finals	(Netherlands) AZ Alkmaar	2–1	62,471	1–0	19,000	3–1
2022–23	UEFA Europa Conference League	Final	(Italy) Fiorentina	2–1			17,363	N/A

=== 2023–24 Europa League ===
West Ham United qualified for the 2023–24 UEFA Europa League after winning the previous season's Europa Conference League final entering at the group stage. It is the first time in the club's history that they have played European football in three consecutive seasons. Following incidents at the previous season's Europa Conference League final in Prague, West Ham supporters were banned from attending the club's first away fixture of their 2023–24 Europa League campaign.

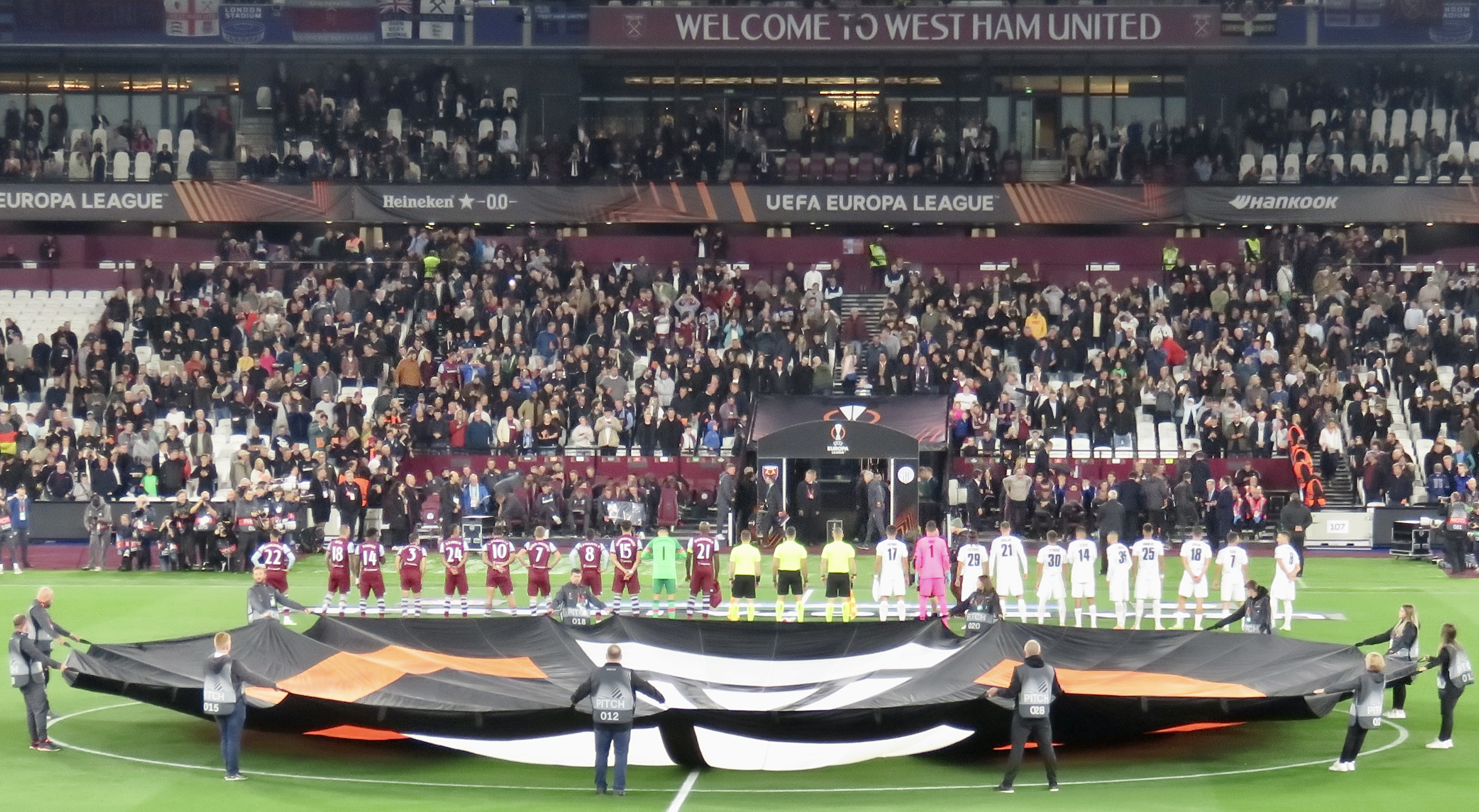
Players of West Ham and FK TSC line up before their Europa League game

West Ham played their first group stage game on 21 September at home to Serbian team, TSC Bačka Topola. A defensive error by Angelo Ogbonna in the 47th minute allowed Petar Stanić to rob him of possession before running on to score past Łukasz Fabiański. West Ham responded with two goals from Mohammed Kudus, his first for the club, in the 66th and 70th minute before Tomáš Souček added a third in the 82nd minute. They played their second game, against Freiburg on 5 October in Germany. Lucas Paquetá scored in the 8th minute from a cross by Jarrod Bowen. In the 49th minute Freiburg equalised when Roland Sallai hit a close-range shot. Nayef Aguerd headed in a James Ward-Prowse corner past goalkeeper Noah Atubolu to make it 2–1 to West Ham, the final score. By winning they became the first English side to go 17 consecutive games in European competition without defeat. On 26 October, West Ham played Greek team, Olympiacos in Piraeus. Kostas Fortounis scored for Olympiacos on 32 minutes and Rodinei’s shot deflected off of Angelo Ogbonna in the first minute of added-time to make the score 2–0 at half time. Although Lucas Paquetá scored in the 87th minute, West Ham lost 2–1. On 9 November, West Ham played the return-leg against Olympiacos at the London Stadium. In a game described as drab, Lucas Paquetá scored the only goal in the 73rd minute from a James Ward-Prowse cross. The 1–0 win put West Ham back on top of their group table with nine points, ahead of Freiburg. On 30 November, West Ham played the return leg in the Europa League against TSC Bačka Topola in Serbia. Manager Moyes made seven changes from their Premier League win at Burnley on 25 November. Injuries to duo Jarrod Bowen and Michail Antonio and to Mohammed Kudus kept them out of the squad. In a slow and ponderous performance, West Ham won 1–0 with the only goal coming from Tomáš Souček in the 89th minute. The win secured West Ham their place in the Europa League knockout stage. On 14 December, West Ham played the home leg against Freiburg. First half goals from Mohammed Kudus and Edson Álvarez put West Ham 2–0 up. No further goals were added in the second half as West Ham won their group table and qualified for the Round of 16. Following West Ham's third successive season of winning their European group, the club rose to 24th in the UEFA coefficients.

==== Round of 16 ====
In the Round of 16, West Ham were drawn against Freiburg, playing the first leg at Freiburg's Europa-Park Stadion on 7 March 2024. They lost by 1–0 after Freiburg's Michael Gregoritsch scored in the 81st minute. On 14 March, the return leg was played at the London Stadium. In the 9th minute, Lucas Paquetá brought the tie level with a goal from a cross by Tomáš Souček. Jarrod Bowen scored in the 32nd minute to make it 2–1 on aggregate. Aaron Cresswell scored in the 52nd minute, his first goal in European competition, to make it 3–1. On 77 minutes, Mohammed Kudus picked up the ball in his own half, went past three defenders and shot past the Freiburg goalkeeper to make it 4–0. He added another on 85 minutes to make it 5–0 on the night and 5–1 on aggregate. Midfielder George Earthy made his professional debut in the game coming on in the 86th minute for Jarrod Bowen. The 5–0 win was West Ham’s biggest win in a European tie.

==== Quarter-finals ====
On 15 March, West Ham were drawn against Bundesliga leaders Bayer Leverkusen. On 11 April, West Ham played Bayer Leverkusen in Germany in the first leg of the quarter-final of the Europa League. West Ham played a defensive game, attempting to score on the break. They held out until the 83rd minute when Jonas Hofmann scored for Leverkusen. Victor Boniface added a second in the 91st minute to make the final score 2–0. The second leg of the quarter-final against Bayer Leverkusen was played at the London Stadium on 18 April. West Ham took the lead with a header from Michail Antonio in the 13th minute. They dominated the opening period but in the second-half looked tired. Leverkusen’s Jeremie Frimpong equalised in the 89th minute with a shot which deflected in off of Aaron Cresswell. The game finished 1–1 and 3–1 on aggregate as West Ham were eliminated from the competition.

Season	Competition	Round	Opposition	Home	Attendance	Away	Attendance	Aggregate
2023–24	UEFA Europa League	Group A	(Serbia) TSC Bačka Topola	3–1	41,374	1–0	4,256	1st
2023–24	UEFA Europa League	Group A	(Germany) Freiburg	2–0	48,876	2–1	34,100	1st
2023–24	UEFA Europa League	Group A	(Greece) Olympiacos	1–0	55,811	1–2	30,623	1st
2023–24	UEFA Europa League	Knockout round play-off	Bye					
2023–24	UEFA Europa League	Round of 16	(Germany) Freiburg	5–0	51,014	0–1	34,700	5–1
2023–24	UEFA Europa League	Quarter-finals	(Germany) Bayer Leverkusen	1–1	62,473	0–2	30,210	1–3

== Overall record in UEFA competitions ==
=== Record by competition ===
Competition	Pld	W	D	L	GF	GA	GD	Best performance
UEFA Europa League	38	18	6	14	53	32	+21	Semi-finals (2022)
European Cup Winners' Cup	30	15	6	9	58	42	+16	Winners (1965)
UEFA Europa Conference League	15	14	1	0	35	9	+26	Winners (2023)
UEFA Intertoto Cup	6	4	1	1	7	3	+4	Winners (1999)
Total	89	51	14	24	153	86	+67	

=== Record by nation ===
Nation	Pld	W	D	L	GF	GA	GD	Opponents
Andorra	2	2	0	0	4	0	+4	Lusitanos
Austria	2	2	0	0	4	0	+4	Rapid Wien
Belgium	9	5	3	1	17	10	+7	Gent, (Note: Also played West Ham United in 1964 under the name La Gantoise) Anderlecht, Genk
Croatia	4	3	0	1	8	2	+6	Osijek, Dinamo Zagreb
Cyprus	2	2	0	0	6	0	+6	AEK Larnaca
Czechoslovakia	2	1	0	1	3	2	+1	Sparta Prague
Denmark	4	4	0	0	10	3	+7	Viborg, Silkeborg
East Germany	2	1	1	0	2	1	+1	Magdeburg
Finland	4	2	2	0	7	3	+4	Lahden Reipas, Jokerit
France	4	2	1	1	7	3	+4	Metz, Lyon
Germany	13	5	1	7	19	16	+3	1860 Munich, (Note: Represented West Germany) Borussia Dortmund, Eintracht Frankfurt, (Note: Represented West Germany in 1976, Germany in 2022) Freiburg, Bayer Leverkusen
Greece	4	2	1	1	8	4	+4	Olympiacos
Italy	3	1	0	2	2	5	−3	Palermo, Fiorentina
Malta	2	1	0	1	1	1	0	Birkirkara
Netherlands	6	5	0	1	10	6	+4	ADO Den Haag, Heerenveen, AZ Alkmaar
Romania	10	3	3	4	14	10	+4	Poli Timișoara, FCSB, (Note: Also played West Ham United in 1999 under the name Steaua București) Astra Giurgiu
Serbia	2	2	0	0	4	1	+3	Bačka Topola
Slovenia	2	1	0	1	4	2	+2	Domžale
Soviet Union	4	2	1	1	6	6	0	Ararat Yerevan, Dinamo Tbilisi
Spain	6	3	1	2	11	7	+4	Real Zaragoza, Castilla, Sevilla
Switzerland	2	2	0	0	6	4	+2	Lausanne-Sport

=== Record by match ===
Season	Competition	Round	Opposition	Home	Away	Aggregate
1964–65	European Cup Winners' Cup	First round	(Belgium) La Gantoise	1–1	1–0	2–1
1964–65	European Cup Winners' Cup	Second round	(Czechoslovakia) Sparta Prague	2–0	1–2	3–2
1964–65	European Cup Winners' Cup	Quarter-finals	(Switzerland) Lausanne-Sport	4–3	2–1	6–4
1964–65	European Cup Winners' Cup	Semi-finals	(Spain) Zaragoza	2–1	1–1	3–2
1964–65	European Cup Winners' Cup	Final	(West Germany) 1860 Munich	2–0 (N)		
1965–66	European Cup Winners' Cup	Second round	(Greece) Olympiacos	4–0	2–2	6–2
1965–66	European Cup Winners' Cup	Quarter-finals	(East Germany) 1. FC Magdeburg	1–0	1–1	2–1
1965–66	European Cup Winners' Cup	Semi-finals	(West Germany) Borussia Dortmund	1–2	1–3	2–5
1975–76	European Cup Winners' Cup	First round	(Finland) Lahden Reipas	3–0	2–2	5–2
1975–76	European Cup Winners' Cup	Second round	(Soviet Union) Ararat Yerevan	3–1	1–1	4–2
1975–76	European Cup Winners' Cup	Quarter-finals	(Netherlands) Den Haag	3–1	2–4	5–5 (a)
1975–76	European Cup Winners' Cup	Semi-finals	(West Germany) Eintracht Frankfurt	3–1	1–2	4–3
1975–76	European Cup Winners' Cup	Final	(Belgium) Anderlecht	2–4 (N)		
1980–81	European Cup Winners' Cup	First round	(Spain) Castilla	5–1	1–3	6–4
1980–81	European Cup Winners' Cup	Second round	(Romania) Poli Timișoara	4–0	0–1	4–1
1980–81	European Cup Winners' Cup	Quarter-finals	(Soviet Union) Dinamo Tbilisi	1–4	1–0	2–4
1999	UEFA Intertoto Cup	Third round	(Finland) Jokerit	1–0	1–1	2–1
1999	UEFA Intertoto Cup	Semi-finals	(Netherlands) Heerenveen	1–0	1–0	2–0
1999	UEFA Intertoto Cup	Final	(France) Metz	0–1	3–1	3–2
1999–2000	UEFA Cup	First round	(Croatia) Osijek	3–0	3–1	6–1
1999–2000	UEFA Cup	Second round	(Romania) Steaua București	0–0	0–2	0–2
2006–07	UEFA Cup	First round	(Italy) Palermo	0–1	0–3	0–4
2015–16	UEFA Europa League	First qualifying round	(Andorra) Lusitanos	3–0	1–0	4–0
2015–16	UEFA Europa League	Second qualifying round	(Malta) Birkirkara	1–0	0–1 (a.e.t.)	1–1 (5–3 p)
2015–16	UEFA Europa League	Third qualifying round	(Romania) Astra Giurgiu	2–2	1–2	3–4
2016–17	UEFA Europa League	Third qualifying round	(Slovenia) Domžale	3–0	1–2	4–2
2016–17	UEFA Europa League	Play-off round	(Romania) Astra Giurgiu	0–1	1–1	1–2
2021–22	UEFA Europa League	Group H	(Croatia) Dinamo Zagreb	0–1	2–0	1st
2021–22	UEFA Europa League	Group H	(Belgium) Genk	3–0	2–2	1st
2021–22	UEFA Europa League	Group H	(Austria) Rapid Wien	2–0	2–0	1st
2021–22	UEFA Europa League	Round of 16	(Spain) Sevilla	2–0	0–1	2–1
2021–22	UEFA Europa League	Quarter-finals	(France) Lyon	1–1	3–0	4–1
2021–22	UEFA Europa League	Semi-finals	(Germany) Eintracht Frankfurt	1–2	0–1	1–3
2022–23	UEFA Europa Conference League	Play-off round	(Denmark) Viborg	3–1	3–0	6–1
2022–23	UEFA Europa Conference League	Group B	(Romania) FCSB	3–1	3–0	1st
2022–23	UEFA Europa Conference League	Group B	(Belgium) Anderlecht	2–1	1–0	1st
2022–23	UEFA Europa Conference League	Group B	(Denmark) Silkeborg	1–0	3–2	1st
2022–23	UEFA Europa Conference League	Round of 16	(Cyprus) AEK Larnaca	4–0	2–0	6–0
2022–23	UEFA Europa Conference League	Quarter-finals	(Belgium) Gent	4–1	1–1	5–2
2022–23	UEFA Europa Conference League	Semi-finals	(Netherlands) AZ	2–1	1–0	3–1
2022–23	UEFA Europa Conference League	Final	(Italy) Fiorentina	2–1 (N)		
2023–24	UEFA Europa League	Group A	(Serbia) TSC	3–1	1–0	1st
2023–24	UEFA Europa League	Group A	(Greece) Olympiacos	1–0	1–2	1st
2023–24	UEFA Europa League	Group A	(Germany) SC Freiburg	2–0	2–1	1st
2023–24	UEFA Europa League	Round of 16	(Germany) SC Freiburg	5–0	0–1	5–1
2023–24	UEFA Europa League	Quarter-finals	(Germany) Bayer Leverkusen	1–1	0–2	1–3

=== European Finals ===
Year	Competition	Opposition	Score	Venue
1965	Cup Winners' Cup	(West Germany) 1860 Munich	2–0	(England) Wembley Stadium, London
1976	Cup Winners' Cup	(Belgium) Anderlecht	2–4	(Belgium) Heysel Stadium, Brussels
1999	Intertoto Cup	(France) Metz	0–1 (1st leg)	(England) Boleyn Ground, London
1999	Intertoto Cup	(France) Metz	3–1 (2nd leg)	(France) Stade Saint-Symphorien, Metz
2023	Europa Conference League	(Italy) Fiorentina	2–1	(Czech Republic) Fortuna Arena, Prague

=== UEFA coefficient ===
Rank	Team	Points
41	(Belgium) Union Saint-Gilloise	48.000
42	(Spain) Real Sociedad	48.000
43	(England) West Ham United	48.000
44	(Portugal) Braga	47.750
45	(France) Lyon	44.750

Correct as of 8 September 2026

== All-time goalscorers in UEFA competitions ==
- Bold indicates player is still with West Ham United
- Correct as of match played 18 April 2024, vs (Germany) Bayer Leverkusen

The following is a list of West Ham United's goalscorers in official UEFA competitions:

Rank	Player	Cup Winners' Cup	Europa League	Conference League	Intertoto Cup	Total
1=	(Jamaica) Michail Antonio	0	3	7	0	10
1=	(England) **Jarrod Bowen**	**0**	**4**	**6**	**0**	**10**
3	(Algeria) Saïd Benrahma	0	3	4	0	7
4=	(England) Johnny Byrne	6	0	0	0	6
4=	(England) David Cross	6	0	0	0	6
6=	(Ghana) Mohammed Kudus	0	5	0	0	5
6=	(Brazil) Lucas Paquetá	0	4	1	0	5
6=	(Italy) Gianluca Scamacca	0	0	5	0	5
9=	(England) Brian Dear	4	0	0	0	4
9=	(England) Frank Lampard	0	1	0	3	4
9=	(England) Martin Peters	4	0	0	0	4
9=	(England) Declan Rice	0	3	1	0	4
9=	(England) Keith Robson	4	0	0	0	4
9=	(Czech Republic) **Tomáš Souček**	**0**	**3**	**1**	**0**	**4**
15=	(England) Billy Bonds	3	0	0	0	3
15=	(England) Trevor Brooking	3	0	0	0	3
15=	(England) Craig Dawson	0	2	1	0	3
15=	(Spain) Pablo Fornals	0	0	3	0	3
15=	(England) Billy Jennings	3	0	0	0	3
15=	(Argentina) Manuel Lanzini	0	1	2	0	3
15=	(England) Mark Noble	0	3	0	0	3
15=	(England) Alan Sealey	3	0	0	0	3
15=	(England) Johnny Sissons	3	0	0	0	3
15=	(England) Alan Taylor	3	0	0	0	3
15=	(Costa Rica) Paulo Wanchope	0	1	0	2	3
26=	(England) Paul Goddard	2	0	0	0	2
26=	(England) Pat Holland	2	0	0	0	2
26=	(England) Geoff Hurst	2	0	0	0	2
26=	(England) Paul Kitson	0	1	0	1	2
26=	(Senegal) Cheikhou Kouyaté	0	2	0	0	2
26=	(England) Graham Paddon	2	0	0	0	2
26=	(Senegal) Diafra Sakho	0	2	0	0	2
26=	(England) James Tomkins	0	2	0	0	2
26=	(Ukraine) Andriy Yarmolenko	0	2	0	0	2
26=	Own goals	1	0	1	0	2
36=	(Morocco) Nayef Aguerd	0	1	0	0	1
36=	(Mexico) **Edson Álvarez**	**0**	**1**	**0**	**0**	**1**
36=	(England) John Bond	1	0	0	0	1
36=	(England) Ronnie Boyce	1	0	0	0	1
36=	(England) Peter Brabrook	1	0	0	0	1
36=	(Italy) Paolo Di Canio	0	1	0	0	1
36=	(England) Aaron Cresswell	0	1	0	0	1
36=	(Morocco) Issa Diop	0	1	0	0	1
36=	(Algeria) Sofiane Feghouli	0	1	0	0	1
36=	(Cameroon) Marc-Vivien Foé	0	1	0	0	1
36=	(England) Danny Ings	0	0	1	0	1
36=	(England) Frank Lampard, Sr.	1	0	0	0	1
36=	(England) Elliot Lee	0	1	0	0	1
36=	(England) Divin Mubama	0	0	1	0	1
36=	(Italy) Emerson Palmieri	0	0	1	0	1
36=	(England) Stuart Pearson	1	0	0	0	1
36=	(England) Geoff Pike	1	0	0	0	1
36=	(England) Neil Ruddock	0	1	0	0	1
36=	(England) Trevor Sinclair	0	0	0	1	1
36=	(Scotland) Ray Stewart	1	0	0	0	1
36=	(Ecuador) Enner Valencia	0	1	0	0	1
36=	(Argentina) Mauro Zárate	0	1	0	0	1
Total		58	53	35	7	153

== Non-UEFA competitions ==
=== 1975 Anglo-Italian League Cup ===
As well as being involved in a Cup Winners' Cup campaign, West Ham participated in the Anglo-Italian League Cup, a short-lived competition played between the winners of the FA Cup and the Coppa Italia. The first leg took place in Florence at the Stadio Artemio Franchi on 3 September 1975, with Fiorentina's Vincenzo Guerini scoring the only goal of the game. In the second leg at Upton Park, Fiorentina again won 1–0, this time with the goal coming from Walter Speggiorin to seal a 2–0 aggregate victory for the Italians.

Season	Competition	Round	Opposition	Home	Attendance	Away	Attendance	Aggregate
1975–76	Anglo-Italian League Cup	Final	(Italy) Fiorentina	0–1	14,699	0–1	30,000	0–2

=== 1992–93 Anglo-Italian Cup ===
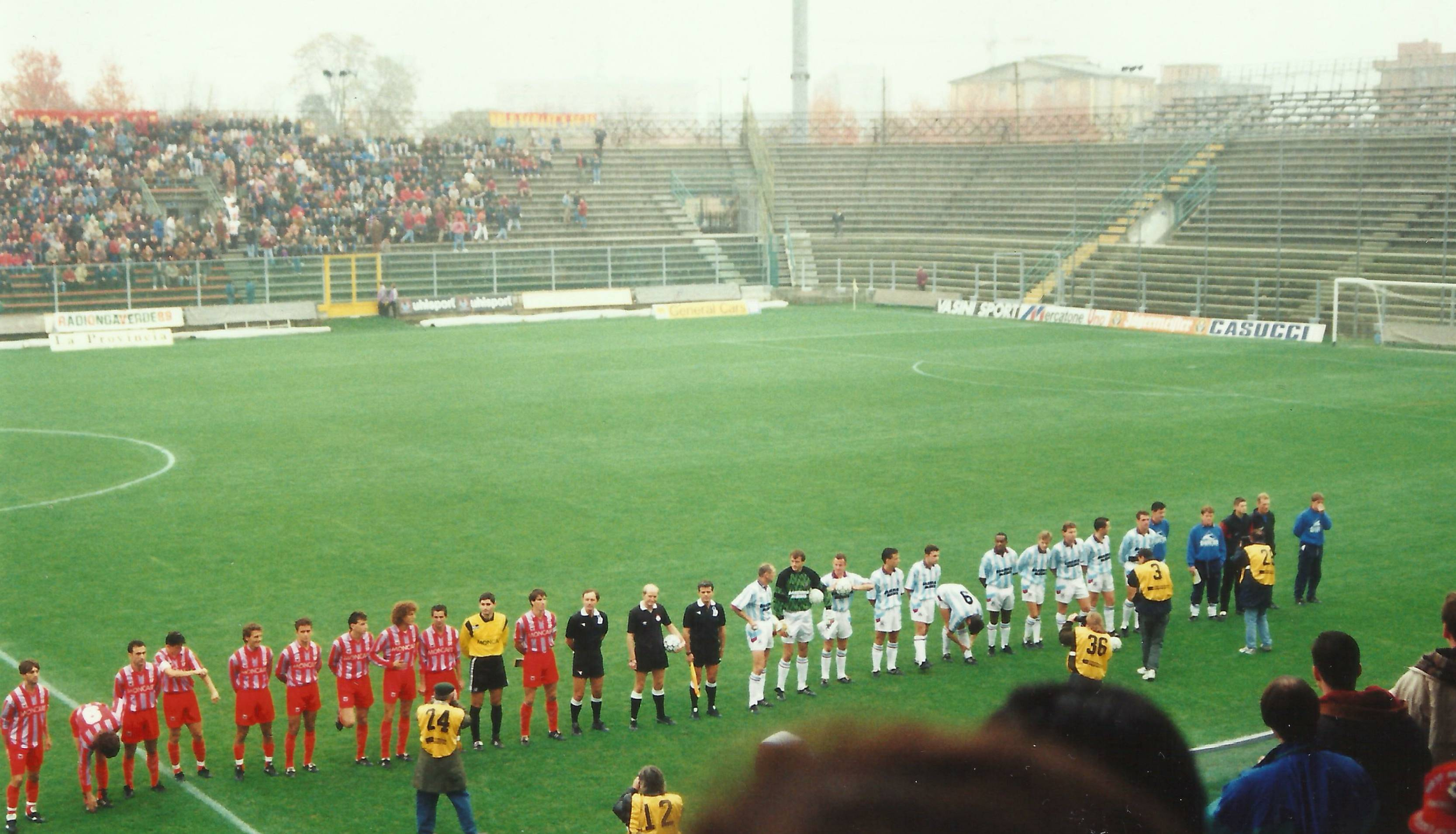
Cremonese and West Ham line-up at Stadio Giovanni Zini, Cremona in the Anglo-Italian Cup, November 1992

The revival of the Anglo-Italian Cup for the 1992–93 campaign saw West Ham, under the management of Billy Bonds, return to European competition for the first time since 1980–81. West Ham started the campaign in a domestic qualifying stage to decide which English clubs would play Italian sides. Their first game on 2 September 1992 was a 2–2 home draw against Bristol Rovers, with both West Ham goals scored by Julian Dicks. The second game was on 30 September against Southend United at Roots Hall. West Ham won the game 3–0 with goals from Dicks, Trevor Morley and Matty Holmes. As a result, They won their preliminary group and qualified for the full competition. This failed to attract interest from fans, however, with attendances as low as 800 away to Cosenza and 1,639 at Cremonese. Of the four games played against Italian opposition West Ham won two, drew and lost one game each. They lost 0–2 away to Cremonese in their opening group game, before beating Reggiana 2–0 at Upton Park, with both goals coming from Clive Allen. Against Cosenza, they won 1–0 away in Italy, with the single goal coming again from Allen. In their final match, West Ham drew 0–0 with Pisa at Upton Park. West Ham were eliminated after finishing third in the English section of the group, with only the best-placed English (Derby County) and best-placed Italian teams (Cremonese) progressing to the next round.

Season	Competition	Round	Opposition	Home	Attendance	Away	Attendance
1992–93	Anglo-Italian Cup	Preliminary Group 8	(England) Bristol Rovers	2–2	4,809	—N/a	—N/a
1992–93	Anglo-Italian Cup	Preliminary Group 8	(England) Southend United	—N/a	—N/a	3–0	6,482
1992–93	Anglo-Italian Cup	Group B	(Italy) Cremonese	—N/a	—N/a	0–2	1,639
1992–93	Anglo-Italian Cup	Group B	(Italy) Reggiana	2–0	6,872	—N/a	—N/a
1992–93	Anglo-Italian Cup	Group B	(Italy) Cosenza	—N/a	—N/a	1–0	800
1992–93	Anglo-Italian Cup	Group B	(Italy) Pisa	0–0	11,912	—N/a	—N/a

==== English Table ====
Team	Pld	W	D	L	GF	GA	GD	Pts
(England) Derby County	4	3	0	1	10	3	+7	9
(England) Tranmere Rovers	4	2	1	1	4	3	+1	7
(England) West Ham United	4	2	1	1	3	2	+1	7
(England) Bristol City	4	0	1	3	6	10	−4	1

==== Italian Table ====
Team	Pld	W	D	L	GF	GA	GD	Pts
(Italy) Cremonese	4	3	1	0	9	4	+5	10
(Italy) Pisa	4	1	1	2	4	7	-3	4
(Italy) Reggiana	4	1	1	2	2	6	−4	4
(Italy) Cosenza	4	1	0	3	3	6	−3	3
