= Gilbert Van Binst =

Belgian footballer (1951–2025)

Gilles Van Binst
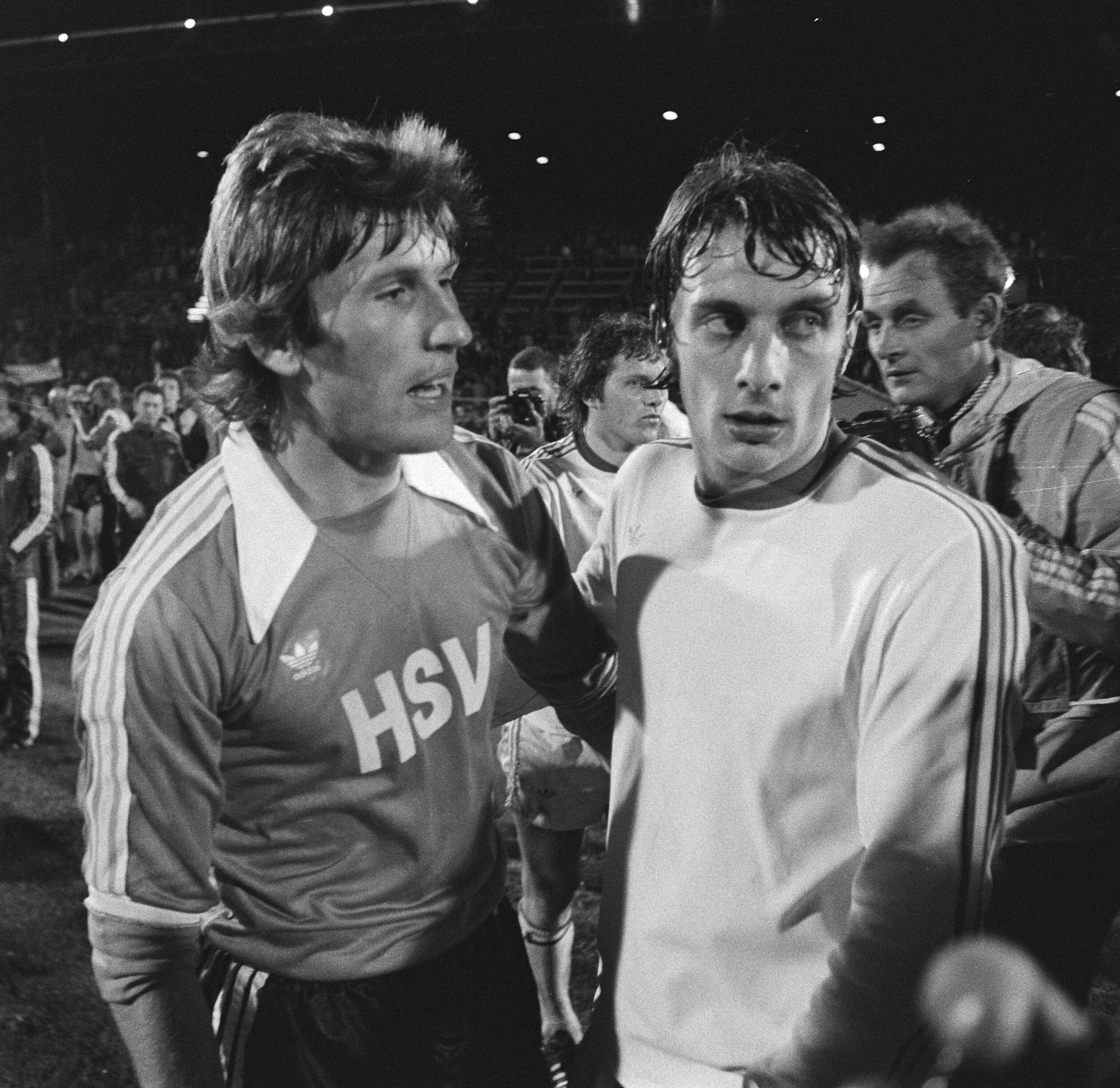
- Van Binst and Manfred Kaltz (left) after the 1977 European Cup Winners' Cup Final

Personal information
- Date of birth: 5 July 1951
- Place of birth: Machelen, Belgium
- Date of death: 3 January 2025 (aged 73)
- Place of death: Zaventem, Belgium
- Height: 1.77 m (5 ft 10 in)
- Position: Defender

Youth career
- 1963–1965: KFC Peutie
- 1965–1966: Vilvoorde FC
- 1966–1968: Anderlecht

Senior career*
Years	Team	Apps	(Gls)
1968–1980	Anderlecht	262	(28)
1980–1981	Toulouse	26	(1)
1981–1983	Club Brugge	31	(0)
Total		319	(29)

International career
1972–1977	Belgium	15	(1)

Managerial career
- 1983–1984: Club Brugge (Assistant)
- 1985–1986: Wallonia Namur
- 1986–1988: KWSC Lauwe
- 1992: SK Oostnieuwkerke
- * Club domestic league appearances and goals

Gilbert Van Binst (5 July 1951 – 3 January 2025) was a Belgian footballer who played as a defender.

== Club career ==
Van Binst played for over a decade for Anderlecht, beginning his professional career with the club in 1968. He won numerous domestic and continental honours during his time with the club, most famously scoring two goals in the win over Austria Wien in the 1978 European Cup Winners' Cup Final. He would move to France to play for Toulouse for one season in 1980. He returned to Belgium in 1981, finishing his career by playing for Anderlecht's city rivals Club Brugge.

== International career ==
Van Binst earned 15 caps for Belgium. He was a part of the squad that finished third at the 1972 European Championships on home soil.

== Death ==
Van Binst died in Zaventem on 3 January 2025, at the age of 73.

== Honours ==
Anderlecht

- Belgian First Division: 1971–72, 1973–74
- Belgian Cup: 1971–72, 1972–73, 1974–75, 1975–76; runner-up 1976–77
- Belgian League Cup: 1973, 1974
- European Cup Winners' Cup: 1975–76, 1977–78; runner-up 1976–77
- European Super Cup: 1976, 1978
- Inter-Cities Fairs Cup runner-up: 1969–70
- Amsterdam Tournament: 1976
- Tournoi de Paris: 1977
- Jules Pappaert Cup: 1977
- Belgian National Sports Merit Award: 1978

Club Brugge

- Belgian Cup runner-up: 1982–83

Belgium

- UEFA European Championship third place: 1972
