= Manfred Steiner (footballer) =

Austrian footballer (1950–2020)

Personal information
- Date of birth: 13 January 1950
- Place of birth: Murau, Austria
- Date of death: 21 October 2020 (aged 70)
- Height: 1.68 m (5 ft 6 in)
- Position: Centre-back

Senior career*
Years	Team	Apps	(Gls)
1970	Kapfenberger SV	10	(0)
1971–1984	Sturm Graz	312	(16)

International career
1975	Austria	2	(0)

Managerial career
- 1988: Sturm Graz (assistant)
- 1988: Sturm Graz
- * Club domestic league appearances and goals

Manfred Steiner (13 January 1950 – 21 October 2020) was an Austrian footballer who played as a centre-back for Sturm Graz and Kapfenberger SV. He made two appearances for the Austria national team in 1975.
