= Henk van Leeuwen =

Dutch footballer

Personal information
- Full name: Hendrik van Leeuwen
- Date of birth: 2 April 1951 (age 75)
- Place of birth: Rotterdam, Netherlands
- Position: Forward

Senior career*
Years	Team	Apps	(Gls)
1969–1972	Feijenoord		
1972–1974	Roda JC Kerkrade		
1974–1981	FC Den Haag	174	(63)
1981–1983	Drechtsteden '79		

International career
1978	Netherlands	2	(1)
- * Club domestic league appearances and goals

Hendrik van Leeuwen (born 2 April 1951) is a Dutch former footballer who played as a forward. He made two appearances for the Netherlands national team in 1978.
