= Nico Rohmann =

Luxembourgish footballer

Personal information
- Date of birth: 23 November 1952 (age 73)
- Place of birth: Luxembourg
- Position: Defender

Senior career*
Years	Team	Apps	(Gls)
1974–1978	US Rumelange		
1978–1980	Charleroi		
1980–1982	Jeunesse Esch		
1980–1982	San Diego Sockers	76	(5)
1981–1983	San Diego Sockers (indoor)	21	(4)
Total		97	(9)

International career
1977–1985	Luxembourg	24	(0)
- * Club domestic league appearances and goals

Nico Rohmann (born 23 November 1952) is a Luxembourgish former footballer who played at both professional and international levels as a defender.

== Career ==
Rohmann played club football in Luxembourg, Belgium and the United States for US Rumelange, Charleroi, Jeunesse Esch and the San Diego Sockers.

He also earned 24 caps for the Luxembourg national team between 1977 and 1985, appearing in 10 FIFA World Cup qualifying matches in the process.
