= 1975–76 West Ham United F.C. season =

English football team season

West Ham United
1975–76 season
- Chairman: Reg Pratt
- Manager: John Lyall & Ron Greenwood
- Stadium: Boleyn Ground
- First Division: 18th
- FA Cup: Third round
- League Cup: Fourth round
- FA Charity Shield: Runners-up
- European Cup Winners' Cup: Runners-up
- Top goalscorer: League: Alan Taylor (13); All: Alan Taylor (17)
- Highest home attendance: 39,202 (vs Eintracht Frankfurt, 14 April 1976)
- Lowest home attendance: 16,769 (vs Wolverhampton Wanderers, 3 April 1976)
- Average home league attendance: 27,345

In the 1975–76 season, West Ham United finished in 18th position in the First Division and reached the final of the European Cup Winners' Cup.

== Season summary ==
West Ham United were unbeaten in their first nine League games of the 1975–76 season and occupied second place in the autumn of 1975. However, in an abrupt downturn in form they collected just eight points and won only one League match after Christmas, leaving them in 18th, only six points away from the relegation places. Their FA Cup defence ended in the third round, when they lost at home to Liverpool.

West Ham saved their best form for their third foray into European competition. Despite failing to win any of their away fixtures, they reached the final of the Cup Winners' Cup, losing 4–2 to Anderlecht.

== League table ==
Pos	Team	Pld	W	D	L	GF	GA	GAv	Pts	Qualification or relegation
16	Aston Villa	42	11	17	14	51	59	0.864	39	
17	Arsenal	42	13	10	19	47	53	0.887	36	
18	West Ham United	42	13	10	19	48	71	0.676	36	
19	Birmingham City	42	13	7	22	57	75	0.760	33	
20	Wolverhampton Wanderers (R)	42	10	10	22	51	68	0.750	30	Relegation to the Second Division

Source: World Football
Rules for classification: 1) Points; 2) Goal average; 3) Goals scored
(R) Relegated

== Results ==
=== Football League First Division ===
Date	Opponent	Venue	Result	Attendance	Goalscorers
16 August 1975	Stoke City	A	2–1	23,744	Gould, A Taylor
19 August 1975	Liverpool	A	2–2	40,564	A Taylor (2)
23 August 1975	Burnley	H	3–2	28,048	A Taylor (2), Paddon
25 August 1975	Tottenham Hotspur	H	1–0	36,567	Robson
30 August 1975	Queens Park Rangers	A	1–1	28,408	Jennings
6 September 1975	Manchester City	H	1–0	29,752	Lampard
13 September 1975	Leicester City	A	3–3	21,413	Bonds, Lampard, Holland
20 September 1975	Sheffield United	H	2–0	28,744	T Taylor, Best
27 September 1975	Wolverhampton Wanderers	A	1–0	18,455	Paddon
4 October 1975	Everton	H	0–1	31,005	
11 October 1975	Newcastle United	H	2–1	30,400	Curbishley, A Taylor
18 October 1975	Middlesbrough	A	0–3	25,831	
25 October 1975	Manchester United	H	2–1	38,528	A Taylor, Gould
1 November 1975	Birmingham City	A	5–1	28,474	Brooking, Pendrey (o.g.), Lampard, A Taylor (2)
8 November 1975	Coventry City	H	1–1	29,501	Robson
15 November 1975	Derby County	A	1–2	31,172	Brooking
22 November 1975	Middlesbrough	H	2–1	26,914	Jennings, Holland
29 November 1975	Arsenal	H	1–0	31,012	A Taylor
6 December 1975	Norwich City	A	0–1	27,020	
13 December 1975	Burnley	A	0–2	14,907	
20 December 1975	Stoke City	H	3–1	21,135	Jennings (3)
26 December 1975	Aston Villa	A	1–4	51,300	Jennings
27 December 1975	Ipswich Town	H	1–2	32,741	T Taylor (pen)
10 January 1976	Leicester City	H	1–1	24,615	A Taylor
17 January 1976	Manchester City	A	0–3	32,147	
24 January 1976	Queens Park Rangers	H	1–0	26,677	A Taylor
31 January 1976	Liverpool	H	0–4	26,741	
7 February 1976	Tottenham Hotspur	A	1–1	32,832	Brooking
14 February 1976	Coventry City	A	0–2	16,173	
21 February 1976	Derby County	H	1–2	24,941	Brooking
23 February 1976	Leeds United	H	1–1	28,025	A Taylor
28 February 1976	Manchester United	A	0–4	57,240	
6 March 1976	Birmingham City	H	1–2	19,868	Curbishley
9 March 1976	Leeds United	A	1–1	28,453	Jennings
13 March 1976	Newcastle United	A	1–2	32,842	Jennings
20 March 1976	Arsenal	A	1–6	34,011	Jennings
27 March 1976	Norwich City	H	0–1	20,628	
3 April 1976	Wolverhampton Wanderers	H	0–0	16,769	
10 April 1976	Sheffield United	A	2–3	18,797	Jennings (2)
17 April 1976	Aston Villa	H	2–2	21,642	Robson, Brooking
19 April 1976	Ipswich Town	A	0–4	28,217	
24 April 1976	Everton	A	0–2	26,101	

=== Charity Shield ===
Date	Opponent	Venue	Result	Attendance	Goalscorers
9 August 1975	Derby County	N	0–2	59,000	

=== FA Cup ===
Round	Date	Opponent	Venue	Result	Attendance	Goalscorers
R3	3 January 1976	Liverpool	H	0–2	32,363	

=== League Cup ===
Round	Date	Opponent	Venue	Result	Attendance	Goalscorers
R2	9 September 1975	Bristol City	H	0–0	19,837	
R2 replay	24 September 1975	Bristol City	A	3–1	19,643	Brooking, Best, A Taylor
R3	8 October 1975	Darlington	H	3–0	19,844	Paddon, Robson, Bonds (pen)
R4	12 November 1975	Tottenham Hotspur	A	0–0	49,126	
R4 replay	24 November 1975	Tottenham Hotspur	H	0–2	38,443	

=== European Cup Winners' Cup ===
Round	Date	Opponent	Venue	Result	Attendance	Goalscorers
R1 1st leg	17 September 1975	Reipas Lahti	A	2–2	4,587	Brooking, Bonds
R1 2nd leg	1 October 1975	Reipas Lahti	H	3–0 (5–2 agg.)	24,131	Robson, Holland, Jennings
R2 1st leg	22 October 1975	Ararat Yerevan	A	1–1	66,662	A Taylor
R2 2nd leg	5 November 1975	Ararat Yerevan	H	3–1 (4–2 agg.)	30,399	Paddon, Robson, A Taylor
QF 1st leg	3 March 1976	Den Haag	A	2–4	26,000	Jennings (2)
QF 2nd leg	17 March 1976	Den Haag	H	3–1 (5–5 agg.)	29,829	A Taylor, Lampard, Bonds
SF 1st leg	31 March 1976	Eintracht Frankfurt	A	1–2	45,000	Paddon
SF 1st leg	14 April 1976	Eintracht Frankfurt	H	3–1 (4–3 agg.)	39,202	Brooking (2), Robson
F	5 May 1976	Anderlecht	N	2–4	58,000	Holland, Robson

=== Anglo-Italian League Cup ===
Date	Opponent	Venue	Result
3 September 1975	Fiorentina	A	0–1
10 December 1975	Fiorentina	H	0-1 (0–2 agg.)

== Players ==
Number		Player	Pos	Eur Apps	Eur Gls	Lge Apps	Lge Gls	FAC Apps	FAC Gls	LC Apps	LC Gls	CS Apps	CS Gls	Date Signed	Previous club
Cup Winners Cup Final Team
1	(England)	Mervyn Day	GK	9		41		1		5		1		1973	Academy
2	(England)	Keith Coleman	RB	6 (1)		26		1		1		0 (1)		1973	Sunderland
3	(England)	Frank Lampard	LB	9	1	37	3	1		4		1		1967	Academy
4	(England)	Billy Bonds (Capt)	CM	9	2	17(1)	1			5	1			1967	Charlton Athletic
5	(England)	Tommy Taylor	D	9		42	2			5		1		1970	Leyton Orient
6	(England)	John McDowell	D	7		36(1)				5		1		1970	Academy
7	(England)	Pat Holland	M	7	2	35	2	1		5		1		1969	Academy
8	(England)	Graham Paddon	M	9	2	39	2	1		5	1	1		1973	Norwich City
9	(England)	Billy Jennings	F	5 (2)	3	26(4)	11	1		1 (2)		1		1974	Watford
10	(England)	Trevor Brooking (Hammer of the Year)	CM	7	3	34	5	1		4	1	1		1967	Academy
11	(England)	Keith Robson	W	9	4	33	3			4	1	0 (1)		1974	Newcastle United
Substitute
12	(England)	Alan Taylor	CF	6 (1)	3	33(2)	13	1		4	1	1		1974	Rochdale
Important Players
6	(England)	Kevin Lock	CH	4		26		1		5		1		1971	Academy
10	(England)	Alan Curbishley	M	1 (1)		12(2)	1	1						1974	Academy
6	(England)	Mick McGiven	CH	1 (1)		6 (1)		1						1973	Sunderland
9	(England)	Bobby Gould	F	1		4 (1)	2					1		1973	Bristol City
Other Players
9	(Bermuda)	Clyde Best	F			5 (2)	1			2	1			1969	Academy
12	(England)	Johnny Ayris	RW			3 (6)	1			0 (1)	1			1970	Academy
11	(Cyprus)	Yılmaz Orhan	F			5								1975	Aveley
1	(Scotland)	Bobby Ferguson	GK			1								1967	Kilmarnock
6	(England)	Alan Wooler	M			1								1973	Reading
12	(England)	Geoff Pike	M			0 (3)								1975	Academy
