= 1978–79 West Ham United F.C. season =

English football team season

West Ham United
1978–79 season
- Chairman: Reg Pratt
- Manager: John Lyall
- Stadium: Boleyn Ground
- Second Division: 5th
- FA Cup: Third round
- League Cup: Second round
- Top goalscorer: League: Pop Robson (24); All: Robson (26)
- Highest home attendance: 35,802 (vs Brighton & Hove Albion, 10 March 1979)
- Lowest home attendance: 19,672 (vs Swindon Town, 30 August 1978)
- Average home league attendance: 25,779

For the 1978–79 West Ham United F.C. season in English football, West Ham United played in the Second Division following their relegation the previous season.

== Season summary ==
West Ham occupied a promotion place at the end of February, but after a loss of form that saw them win just one of their last seven League matches they finished in fifth place. They were knocked out of both domestic cup competitions by lower league opposition in the first round they entered.

In February 1979, West Ham broke the world record transfer fee for a goalkeeper when they signed Phil Parkes from Queens Park Rangers for £565,000.

== League table ==
Pos	Team	Pld	W	D	L	GF	GA	GD	Pts	Qualification or relegation
3	Stoke City (P)	42	20	16	6	58	31	+27	56	Promotion to the First Division
4	Sunderland	42	22	11	9	70	44	+26	55	
5	West Ham United	42	18	14	10	70	39	+31	50	
6	Notts County	42	14	16	12	48	60	−12	44	
7	Preston North End	42	12	18	12	59	57	+2	42	

Rules for classification: 1) Points; 2) Goal difference; 3) Goals scored
(P) Promoted

== Results ==
=== Football League Second Division ===
Date	Opponent	Venue	Result	Attendance	Goalscorers
19 August 1978	Notts County	H	5–2	25,387	Cross (3), Blockley (o.g.), Devonshire
23 August 1978	Newcastle United	A	3–0	27,233	Devonshire, Cross, Robson
26 August 1978	Crystal Palace	A	1–1	32,611	A Taylor
2 September 1978	Fulham	H	0–1	25,778	
9 September 1978	Burnley	A	2–3	12,303	Cross (2)
16 September 1978	Bristol Rovers	H	2–0	22,189	Robson, Brooking
23 September 1978	Sheffield United	H	2–0	24,361	Robson (2 pens)
30 September 1978	Sunderland	A	1–2	23,676	Cross
7 October 1978	Millwall	H	3–0	22,000	Robson (3; 1 pen)
14 October 1978	Oldham Athletic	A	2–2	10,143	Robson (2)
21 October 1978	Stoke City	H	1–1	27,859	Brooking
28 October 1978	Brighton & Hove Albion	A	2–1	32,634	Robson (2)
4 November 1978	Preston North End	H	3–1	23,579	Lampard, Devonshire, Cross
11 November 1978	Notts County	A	0–1	11,002	
18 November 1978	Crystal Palace	H	1–1	31,245	Bonds
21 November 1978	Fulham	A	0–0	26,556	
25 November 1978	Leicester City	A	2–1	16,149	Cross (2)
2 December 1978	Cambridge United	H	5–0	21,379	A Taylor, Robson (2), Bonds, Curbishley
9 December 1978	Wrexham	A	3–4	15,787	Cross, Lampard, Robson
16 December 1978	Charlton Athletic	H	2–0	23,833	Robson, Cross
26 December 1978	Orient	H	0–2	29,220	
30 December 1978	Blackburn Rovers	H	4–0	21,269	Robson, A Taylor, Cross, Curtis (o.g.)
20 January 1979	Bristol Rovers	A	1–0	12,418	Robson
10 February 1979	Sunderland	H	3–3	24,998	Cross (2), Robson
24 February 1979	Oldham Athletic	H	3–0	26,052	Holland, Martin, Robson
26 February 1979	Luton Town	A	4–1	14,205	Cross (2), Devonshire, Robson
3 March 1979	Stoke City	A	0–2	24,912	
10 March 1979	Brighton & Hove Albion	H	0–0	35,802	
17 March 1979	Preston North End	A	0–0	15,376	
24 March 1979	Newcastle United	H	5–0	24,650	Devonshire, Robson, Lampard, McDowell (2)
31 March 1979	Leicester City	H	1–1	23,992	Robson
2 April 1979	Sheffield United	A	0–3	17,720	
7 April 1979	Cambridge United	A	0–0	11,406	
9 April 1979	Luton Town	H	1–0	25,498	Carr (o.g.)
14 April 1979	Orient	A	2–0	17,517	Holland, Pike
16 April 1979	Cardiff City	H	1–1	29,058	Holland
21 April 1979	Charlton Athletic	A	0–0	22,816	
24 April 1979	Burnley	H	3–1	24,139	Bonds, Pike, Robson
28 April 1979	Wrexham	H	1–1	28,865	Bonds
5 May 1979	Blackburn Rovers	A	0–1	7,585	
11 May 1979	Cardiff City	A	0–0	13,140	
14 May 1979	Millwall	A	1–2	11,917	Robson

=== FA Cup ===
Round	Date	Opponent	Venue	Result	Attendance	Goalscorers
R3	9 January 1979	Newport County	A	1–2	14,124	Robson

=== League Cup ===
Round	Date	Opponent	Venue	Result	Attendance	Goalscorers
R2	30 August 1978	Swindon Town	H	1–2	19,672	Robson

== Players ==
Nation	Player	Pos	Lge Apps	Lge Gls	FAC Apps	FAC Gls	LC Apps	LC Gls	Date Signed	Previous club
(England)	Mervyn Day	GK	13		1				1973	Academy
(Scotland)	Bobby Ferguson	GK	11				1		1967	Kilmarnock
(England)	Phil Parkes	GK	18						1973	Q.P.R.
(England)	Phil Brignull	DF	0 (1)						1978	Academy
(England)	Paul Brush	DF	42		1		1		1977	Academy
(England)	Frank Lampard	DF	28 (1)	3	1		1		1967	Academy
(England)	Alvin Martin	DF	22	1	1				1976	Academy
(England)	John McDowell	DF	26 (2)	2	1				1969	Academy
(England)	Tommy Taylor	DF	32				1		1970	Leyton Orient
(England)	Billy Bonds (Capt)	MF	39	4	1		1		1967	Charlton Athletic
(England)	Trevor Brooking	MF	21	2	1				1967	Academy
(England)	Alan Curbishley	MF	26 (1)	1			1		1974	Academy
(England)	Alan Devonshire	MF	41	5	1		1		1976	Southall
(England)	Pat Holland	MF	39	3			1		1969	Academy
(England)	Geoff Pike	MF	10 (4)	1			0 (1)		1975	Academy
(England)	David Cross	FW	40	18	1		1		1977	West Bromwich Albion
(England)	Billy Jennings	FW	2 (2)						1974	Watford
(England)	Billy Lansdowne	FW	0 (1)						1979	Academy
(England)	Nicky Morgan	FW	2						1978	Academy
(England)	Pop Robson	FW	40	24	1	1	1	1	1976	Sunderland
(England)	Alan Taylor	FW	10 (3)	3	1		1		1974	Rochdale
