= 1977–78 West Ham United F.C. season =

English football team season

West Ham United
1977–78 season
- Chairman: Reg Pratt
- Manager: John Lyall
- Stadium: Boleyn Ground
- First Division: 20th (relegated)
- FA Cup: Fourth round
- League Cup: Second round
- Top goalscorer: League: Derek Hales (10); All: Pop Robson (11)
- Highest home attendance: 37,448 (vs Liverpool, 29 April 1978)
- Lowest home attendance: 19,260 (vs Coventry City, 1 April 1978)
- Average home league attendance: 25,655

In the 1977–78 season West Ham United were relegated from the First Division after twenty years in the top flight since their promotion in 1958.

== Season summary ==
Despite winning six of their last nine League matches, they paid the price for a terrible start to the season that had seen them win just one of their first twelve games, and were relegated when they lost their last match to Liverpool and Wolverhampton Wanderers beat Aston Villa. They finished one point behind Queens Park Rangers and went down to the Second Division alongside Newcastle United and Leicester City. They also suffered a heavy 6–1 defeat to QPR in the FA Cup, equalling their record margin of defeat in the competition at that time.

A season of few highlights saw the introduction to the first team of Alvin Martin and David Cross, both of whom went on to play significant parts in the club's revival in subsequent seasons.

== League table ==
Pos	Team	Pld	W	D	L	GF	GA	GD	Pts	Qualification or relegation
18	Ipswich Town	42	11	13	18	47	61	−14	35	Qualification for the European Cup Winners' Cup first round (Note: Ipswich Town qualified for the European Cup Winners' Cup as the 1977–78 FA Cup winners.)
19	Queens Park Rangers	42	9	15	18	47	64	−17	33	
20	West Ham United (R)	42	12	8	22	52	69	−17	32	Relegation to the Second Division
21	Newcastle United (R)	42	6	10	26	42	78	−36	22	Relegation to the Second Division
22	Leicester City (R)	42	5	12	25	26	70	−44	22	Relegation to the Second Division

Source: World Football
Rules for classification: 1) Points; 2) Goal difference; 3) Goals scored
(R) Relegated

== Results ==
=== Football League First Division ===
Date	Opponent	Venue	Result	Attendance	Goalscorers
20 August 1977	Norwich City	H	1–3	28,178	Robson (pen)
24 August 1977	Leicester City	A	0–1	18,310	
27 August 1977	Manchester City	H	0–1	25,278	
3 September 1977	Newcastle United	A	3–2	26,983	Jennings, A Taylor, Robson
10 September 1977	Queens Park Rangers	H	2–2	26,922	Holland, Lock
17 September 1977	Bristol City	A	2–3	21,180	Robson, Pike
24 September 1977	Everton	H	1–1	25,296	Dobson (o.g.)
1 October 1977	Arsenal	A	0–3	41,245	
3 October 1977	Middlesbrough	H	0–2	26,508	Jennings
8 October 1977	Nottingham Forest	H	0–0	26,126	
15 October 1977	Wolverhampton Wanderers	A	2–2	19,366	Pike, Robson
22 October 1977	Aston Villa	H	2–2	26,599	T Taylor, Hales
29 October 1977	Ipswich Town	A	2–0	27,308	Hales (2)
5 November 1977	Coventry City	A	0–1	23,276	
12 November 1977	West Bromwich Albion	H	3–3	23,601	Robson (pen), Devonshire (2)
19 November 1977	Derby County	A	1–2	23,273	Bonds
26 November 1977	Leeds United	H	0–1	26,883	
3 December 1977	Liverpool	A	0–2	39,659	
10 December 1977	Manchester United	H	2–1	20,759	Hales, Brooking
17 December 1977	West Bromwich Albion	A	0–1	18,868	
26 December 1977	Birmingham City	H	1–0	25,572	Curbishley
27 December 1977	Chelsea	A	1–2	44,083	Robson
31 December 1977	Leicester City	H	3–2	16,201	McDowell, Hales, Cross
2 January 1978	Norwich City	A	2–2	29,480	Devonshire, Hales
14 January 1978	Manchester City	A	2–3	43,627	Brooking, Cross
21 January 1978	Newcastle United	H	1–0	25,461	Hales
11 February 1978	Bristol City	H	1–2	19,934	Robson
18 February 1978	Everton	A	1–2	33,862	Hales
25 February 1978	Arsenal	H	2–2	31,675	A Taylor, Cross
4 March 1978	Nottingham Forest	A	0–2	33,924	
11 March 1978	Wolverhampton Wanderers	H	1–2	23,525	Hales
14 March 1978	Queens Park Rangers	A	0–1	20,394	
18 March 1978	Aston Villa	A	1–4	28,275	Brooking
24 March 1978	Ipswich Town	H	3–0	23,867	Cross (3)
25 March 1978	Chelsea	H	3–1	24,987	Brooking, Green, Holland
28 March 1978	Birmingham City	A	0–3	23,554	
1 April 1978	Coventry City	H	2–1	19,260	T Taylor, Holland
8 April 1978	Leeds United	A	2–1	22,953	Martin, Hales
15 April 1978	Derby County	H	3–0	25,424	Robson (2), Cross
22 April 1978	Manchester United	A	0–3	54,089	
25 April 1978	Middlesbrough	A	2–1	13,247	Cross (2)
29 April 1978	Liverpool	H	0–2	37,448	

=== FA Cup ===
Round	Date	Opponent	Venue	Result	Attendance	Goalscorers
R3	7 January 1978	Watford	H	1–0	36,745	Robson
R4	28 January 1978	Queens Park Rangers	H	1–1	35,566	Bonds
R4 replay	31 January 1978	Queens Park Rangers	A	1–6	24,057	Robson

=== League Cup ===
Round	Date	Opponent	Venue	Result	Attendance	Goalscorers
R2	30 August 1977	Nottingham Forest	A	0–5	18,224	

== Players ==
Nation	Player	Pos	Lge Apps	Lge Gls	FAC Apps	FAC Gls	LC Apps	LC Gls	Date signed	Previous club
First Team
(England)	Mervyn Day	GK	23				1		1973	Academy
(England)	Frank Lampard	LB	40		3		1		1967	Academy
(England)	Paul Brush	RB	23 (1)				1		1977	Academy
(England)	Billy Bonds (Capt)	CM	29	1	3	1			1967	Charlton Athletic
(England)	Tommy Taylor	D	42	2	3				1970	Leyton Orient
(England)	Alan Curbishley	M	31 (1)	1	3		1		1974	Academy
(England)	Alan Devonshire	LM	32 (2)	3	3		1		1976	Southall
(England)	Geoff Pike	M	25 (3)	2	0 (1)		1		1975	Academy
(England)	Trevor Brooking	CM	37	4	2				1967	Academy
(England)	Derek Hales	CF	23 (1)	10	3				1977	Derby County
(England)	Pop Robson	CF	37	9	3	2	1		1976	Sunderland
Other Players
(England)	David Cross	RW	21	9	3				1977	West Bromwich Albion
(Scotland)	Bobby Ferguson	GK	19		3				1967	Kilmarnock
(England)	Bill Green	CH	13	1			1		1976	Carlisle United
(England)	Pat Holland	M	18 (3)	3	1				1969	Academy
(England)	Billy Jennings	F	2	1					1974	Watford
(England)	Kevin Lock	CH	6	1			1		1971	Academy
(England)	Alvin Martin	CH	5 (2)	1					1976	Academy
(England)	John McDowell	D	12 (2)	1	3				1969	Academy
(England)	Mick McGiven	CH	4						1973	Sunderland
(England)	Anton Otulakowski	M	0 (5)						1976	Barnsley
(England)	John Radford	M	10				1		1976	Arsenal
(England)	Alan Taylor	CF	10 (1)	2	0 (1)		1		1974	Rochdale
