= 1976 European Cup Winners' Cup final =

- Match programme cover
- Event: 1975–76 European Cup Winners' Cup
Anderlecht	West Ham United
(Belgium)	(England)
4	2
- Date: 5 May 1976
- Venue: Heysel Stadium, Brussels
- Referee: Robert Wurtz (France)
- Attendance: 51,296

The 1976 European Cup Winners' Cup final was a football match between Anderlecht of Belgium and West Ham United of England. The final was held at Heysel Stadium in Brussels on 5 May 1976. It was the final match of the 1975–76 European Cup Winners' Cup tournament and the 16th European Cup Winners' Cup final. Anderlecht won 4–2 against the 1964–65 European Cup Winners' Cup winners to secure their first ever European trophy.

== Route to the final ==
(Belgium) Anderlecht					(England) West Ham United			
Opponent	Agg.	1st leg	2nd leg		Opponent	Agg.	1st leg	2nd leg
(Romania) Rapid București	2–1	0–1 (A)	2–0 (H)	First round	(Finland) Reipas Lahti	5–2	2–2 (A)	3–0 (H)
(Socialist Federal Republic of Yugoslavia) Borac Banja Luka	3–1	3–0 (H)	0–1 (A)	Second round	(Soviet Union) Ararat Yerevan	4–2	1–1 (A)	3–1 (H)
(Wales) Wrexham	2–1	1–0 (H)	1–1 (A)	Quarter-finals	(Netherlands) Den Haag	5–5 (a)	2–4 (A)	3–1 (H)
(East Germany) Sachsenring Zwickau	5–0	3–0 (A)	2–0 (H)	Semi-finals	(West Germany) Eintracht Frankfurt	4–3	1–2 (A)	3–1 (H)

== Match ==
=== Summary ===
Pat Holland put West Ham into the lead in the 28th minute. Just before half-time, Frank Lampard misjudged a back pass, allowing Peter Ressel to collect the ball and pass it to Rob Rensenbrink to score the equaliser. In attempting the backpass, Lampard tore a stomach muscle that required him to be substituted. Three minutes into the second-half, François Van der Elst scored, assisted by Rensenbrink. Keith Robson later equalised for West Ham from a cross by Trevor Brooking. Anderlecht were awarded a dubious penalty in the 73rd minute after Holland challenged Rensenbrink but appeared to win the ball cleanly; Rensenbrink scored from the penalty spot. With two minutes left, as West Ham came close to an equaliser, van der Elst ran through on the break to score Anderlecht's fourth goal.

=== Details ===
5 May 1976

Anderlecht (Belgium)	4–2	(England) West Ham United
Rensenbrink 42', 73' (pen.); Van der Elst 48', 88'	Report	Holland 28'; Robson 68'

Heysel Stadium, Brussels
Attendance: 51,296
Referee: Robert Wurtz (France)

R.S.C. Anderlecht	West Ham United

GK	1	(Netherlands) Jan Ruiter
DF	2	(Belgium) Michel Lomme
DF	3	(Belgium) Hugo Broos
DF	4	(Belgium) Gilbert Van Binst (c)
DF	5	(Belgium) Jean Thissen
MF	6	(Belgium) Jean Dockx
FW	7	(Belgium) François Van der Elst
MF	8	(Netherlands) Arie Haan
MF	9	(Netherlands) Peter Ressel
MF	10	(Belgium) Ludo Coeck	(substituted off) 32'
FW	11	(Netherlands) Rob Rensenbrink
Substitutes:
MF	15	(Belgium) Franky Vercauteren	(substituted on) 32'
Manager:
(Netherlands) Hans Croon

GK	1	(England) Mervyn Day
DF	2	(England) Keith Coleman
DF	3	(England) Frank Lampard	(substituted off) 46'
DF	4	(England) Billy Bonds (c)
DF	5	(England) Tommy Taylor
MF	6	(England) John McDowell
MF	7	(England) Pat Holland
MF	8	(England) Graham Paddon
FW	9	(England) Billy Jennings
MF	10	(England) Trevor Brooking
FW	11	(England) Keith Robson
Substitutes:
FW	12	(England) Alan Taylor	(substituted on) 46'
GK	13	(Scotland) Bobby Ferguson
DF	14	(England) Kevin Lock
MF	15	(England) Alan Curbishley
Manager:
(England) John Lyall

== See also ==
- 1975–76 European Cup Winners' Cup
- 1976 European Cup Final
- 1976 UEFA Cup Final
- R.S.C. Anderlecht in European football
- West Ham United F.C. in European football
