= 1980 FA Charity Shield =

Liverpool	West Ham United
1	0
- Date: 9 August 1980
- Venue: Wembley Stadium, London
- Referee: John Hunting (Leicester)
- Attendance: 90,000

The 1980 FA Charity Shield was the 58th FA Charity Shield, an annual football match played between the winners of the previous season's Football League and FA Cup competitions. The match took place on 9 August 1980 at Wembley Stadium and was played between 1979–80 Football League champions Liverpool and FA Cup winners West Ham United. It ended in a 1–0 victory for Liverpool, the only goal coming from Terry McDermott in the 17th minute from close range after the West Ham goalkeeper Phil Parkes spilled a shot from Alan Kennedy from the left of the penalty area.

== Match summary ==
Football League champions Liverpool won the game 1–0 with a single goal in the 17th minute from Terry McDermott. It was Liverpool's fifth success in the competition

== Match details ==
9 August 1980
15:00 UTC+1

Liverpool	1–0	West Ham United
McDermott 17'

Wembley Stadium, London
Attendance: 90,000

Liverpool	West Ham United

Liverpool:
GK	1	(England) Ray Clemence
DF	2	(England) Phil Neal
DF	3	(England) Alan Kennedy
DF	4	(England) Phil Thompson (c)
MF	5	(England) Ray Kennedy
DF	6	(Scotland) Alan Hansen
FW	7	(Scotland) Kenny Dalglish
MF	8	(England) Jimmy Case
FW	9	(England) David Johnson
MF	10	(England) Terry McDermott
MF	11	(Scotland) Graeme Souness
Substitutes:
MF	12	(England) Colin Irwin
MF	13	(England) Sammy Lee
DF	14	(Israel) Avi Cohen
FW	15	(England) David Fairclough
GK	16	(England) Steve Ogrizovic
Manager:
(England) Bob Paisley

West Ham United
GK	1	(England) Phil Parkes
DF	2	(Scotland) Ray Stewart
DF	3	(England) Paul Brush
DF	4	(England) Billy Bonds (c)
DF	5	(England) Alvin Martin
MF	6	(England) Alan Devonshire
MF	7	(England) Paul Allen
MF	8	(England) Pat Holland
FW	9	(England) David Cross
MF	10	(England) Trevor Brooking
FW	11	(England) Geoff Pike	Substituted off
Substitutes:
DF	12	(England) Frank Lampard
GK	13	(Scotland) Bobby Ferguson
MF	14	(England) Jimmy Neighbour
FW	15	(England) Nicky Morgan	Substituted on
Manager:
(England) John Lyall

Match rules

- 90 minutes, no extra time
- Five named substitutes
- Maximum of three substitutions

== See also ==
- 1979–80 Football League
- 1979–80 FA Cup
