= 1975 FA Cup final =

- Event: 1974–75 FA Cup
West Ham United	Fulham
2	0
- Date: 3 May 1975
- Venue: Wembley Stadium, London
- Referee: Pat Partridge (Bishop Auckland)
- Attendance: 100,000

The 1975 FA Cup final was the 94th final of the FA Cup. It took place on 3 May 1975 at Wembley Stadium and was contested by London clubs West Ham United and Fulham. The Fulham team contained two former England captains in former West Ham United captain Bobby Moore, making his last appearance at Wembley, and Alan Mullery.

West Ham United won 2–0, with both goals scored by Alan Taylor. The first came in the 60th minute when Fulham goalkeeper Peter Mellor parried Billy Jennings' shot into Taylor's path and Taylor's shot went in through Mellor's legs; the second came four minutes later when Taylor capitalised after Mellor failed to hold on to Graham Paddon's shot.

The 1975 West Ham United team remains the last all-English team to win the FA Cup. The match remains the only occasion that Fulham have appeared in an FA Cup final; it was the club's last major final for 35 years, until the 2010 UEFA Europa League Final.

== Background ==
West Ham United had won the FA Cup once previously in 1964 when they defeated Preston North End 3–2.

Fulham had never previously played in an FA Cup final. Their previous best run was to the semi-finals in 1907–08 (lost 6–0 to Newcastle United), 1935–36 (lost 2–1 to Sheffield United), 1957–58 (lost 5–3 to Manchester United in a replay) and 1961–62 (lost 2–1 to Burnley in a replay).

== Route to final ==
=== West Ham United ===
In the third round, West Ham United faced Southampton at The Dell and won 2–1. In the fourth round, they needed a replay to overcome Swindon Town. After a 1–1 draw at Upton Park, West Ham United progressed with a 2–1 win at the County Ground. They then defeated Queens Park Rangers 2–1 at Upton Park in the fifth round. West Ham United faced Arsenal at Highbury in the quarter-finals and won 2–0. In the semi-finals, they required a replay to overcome Ipswich Town. After a goalless draw at the neutral Villa Park in Birmingham, West Ham United won 2–1 at Stamford Bridge in London.

=== Fulham ===
Fulham faced Hull City in the third round. After a 1–1 draw at Craven Cottage and a 2–2 draw in the replay at Boothferry Park, Fulham advanced with a 1–0 win in the second replay at the neutral Filbert Street in Leicester. In the fourth round, they faced Nottingham Forest. A goalless draw at Craven Cottage was succeeded by a 1–1 draw at the City Ground and a subsequent 1–1 draw, again at Craven Cottage in the second replay. Fulham eventually advanced with a 2–1 win at the City Ground in the third replay. In the fifth round, Fulham defeated Everton 2–1 at Goodison Park. They then faced Carlisle United at Brunton Park in the quarter-finals and won 1–0. Fulham again required a replay in their semi-final against Birmingham City. After a 1–1 at the neutral Hillsborough Stadium in Sheffield, Fulham progressed to the final with a 1–0 win at Maine Road in Manchester.

== Match details ==
3 May 1975
15:00 BST

West Ham United	2–0	Fulham
A. Taylor 60', 64'	(Report)

Wembley Stadium, London
Attendance: 100,000
Referee: Pat Partridge

West Ham	Fulham

GK	1	(England) Mervyn Day
DF	2	(England) John McDowell
DF	3	(England) Frank Lampard Sr.
MF	4	(England) Billy Bonds (c)
DF	5	(England) Tommy Taylor
DF	6	(England) Kevin Lock
FW	7	(England) Billy Jennings
MF	8	(England) Graham Paddon
FW	9	(England) Alan Taylor
MF	10	(England) Trevor Brooking
MF	11	(England) Pat Holland
Substitute:
FW	12	(England) Bobby Gould
Manager:
(England) John Lyall

GK	1	(England) Peter Mellor
DF	2	(England) John Cutbush
DF	3	(England) John Fraser
MF	4	(England) Alan Mullery (c)
DF	5	(England) John Lacy
DF	6	(England) Bobby Moore
FW	7	(England) John Mitchell
MF	8	(Republic of Ireland) Jim Conway
FW	9	(England) Viv Busby
MF	10	(England) Alan Slough
MF	11	(England) Les Barrett
Substitute:
MF	12	(England) Barry Lloyd
Manager:
(England) Alec Stock

== Aftermath ==
This was the second time that West Ham United had won the FA Cup. As defending champions the following season, they were eliminated at the first hurdle after losing 2–0 to Liverpool at Upton Park in the third round. They would win the FA Cup for a third time in 1980.

Fulham have not played in an FA Cup final since this match. Their best run in the next 50 seasons was to the semi-finals in 2001–02 (lost 1–0 to Chelsea).
