= John Cutbush =

English footballer

Personal information
- Date of birth: 28 June 1949 (age 77)
- Place of birth: Malta
- Height: 5 ft 8 in (1.73 m)
- Position: Right back

Youth career
- –1966: Tottenham Hotspur

Senior career*
Years	Team	Apps	(Gls)
1966–1972	Tottenham Hotspur	0	(0)
1972–1977	Fulham	134	(3)
1977–1981	Sheffield United	129	(1)
1981	Wichita Wings		
Total		263	(4)
- * Club domestic league appearances and goals

John Cutbush (born 28 June 1949) is an English retired professional footballer who played as a right back. Cutbush was active in both England and the United States, and made over 250 career league appearances.

== Career ==
Born in Malta, Cutbush began his career in England with the youth team of Tottenham Hotspur. Cutbush never made a league appearance for Tottenham, and later played for Fulham, with whom he played in the 1975 FA Cup Final, and Sheffield United in the Football League, before moving to the United States to play indoor soccer with the Wichita Wings.

== Honours ==
Fulham

- FA Cup runner-up: 1974–75
