= Graham Paddon =

English footballer (1950–2007)

Personal information
- Full name: Graham Charles Paddon
- Date of birth: 24 August 1950
- Place of birth: Manchester, England
- Date of death: 19 November 2007 (aged 57)
- Place of death: Scratby, England
- Position: Midfielder

Youth career
- Coventry City

Senior career*
Years	Team	Apps	(Gls)
1968–1969	Coventry City	5	(1)
1969–1973	Norwich City	162	(19)
1973–1976	West Ham United	115	(11)
1976–1981	Norwich City	128	(6)
1978	→ Tampa Bay Rowdies (loan)	25	(5)
1981	→ Millwall (loan)	5	(1)
1982–1984	Eastern AA		
1984–1985	Alfreton Town	29	(0)
Total		469	(43)

International career
1976	England U23	1	(1)

Managerial career
- 1991: Stoke City (caretaker manager)
- * Club domestic league appearances and goals

Graham Charles Paddon (24 August 1950 – 19 November 2007) was an English footballer who played as a midfielder for Coventry City, Millwall, Norwich City and West Ham United.

== Playing career ==
Paddon was born in Manchester and began his career as an apprentice with Coventry City under Noel Cantwell. He made his senior debut in February 1969, coming on as a substitute in a 3–1 victory over Queens Park Rangers. He made five First Division appearances for the Midlands club, scoring one goal, before signing for Norwich City, then of the Second Division, in October 1969 for £25,000. He played in the Canaries' promotion-winning team of 1971–72, his eight goals helping the team to the league title. The following season, he helped the club to reach the 1973 League Cup Final. He scored all three goals in the quarter-final against Arsenal and saw victory in the two-legged semi-final against Chelsea, but was not able to stop Tottenham Hotspur winning the Final by a single goal.

After 198 appearances and 28 goals for the Canaries, Paddon joined West Ham United, also of the First Division, for £170,000 in December 1973 in a deal which saw Ted MacDougall move the other way. The deal saw Paddon become West Ham's most expensive player. Joining a team that included Billy Bonds and Trevor Brooking and was managed by Ron Greenwood, he made 26 appearances for the east London club during the 1973–74 season.

Paddon's first full season at West Ham, by that point managed by John Lyall, saw 54 appearances and 4 goals. He featured all of the games in the successful 1974–75 FA Cup run, with the second goal of the 2–0 victory in the Final against Fulham scored by Alan Taylor after 'keeper Peter Mellor failed to deal with a shot by Paddon. The season also featured what Paddon described afterwards as "the best goal I've ever scored", a 40-yarder against Wolverhampton Wanderers that found the net with some help from the wind. He managed 5 goals in 57 appearances during the 1975–76 season, including every game of the European Cup Winners' Cup campaign. He scored from 30 yards in the first leg of the semi-final against Eintracht Frankfurt, but the team were only able to pick up a runners-up medal in the Final against Anderlecht. He made a total of 152 appearances, scoring 15 goals, in his three years at West Ham. His exploits that season resulted in him being voted runner-up for Hammer of the Year, behind Brooking.

On 23 March 1976, Paddon made his only international appearance when he played for the England under-23 team as a permitted over-age player in a game against Hungary. He scored the final goal of a 3–1 victory.

Paddon rejoined Norwich, who by that point had returned to the top tier, for £110,000 in November 1976, but suffered a broken leg in only his third game back with the Norfolk club. It would be a full year before his return to first-team football. He went on to captain the club, who remained in the First Division until the 1980–81 season.

He spent time in the United States with the Tampa Bay Rowdies in 1978, and scored a goal against Norwich in an indoor friendly between the two sides on 3 May 1978 in St. Petersburg, Florida.

In all, Paddon made 290 League appearances and 25 scored goals over his two spells at Norwich. He spent some time on loan at Millwall during the 1981–82 season, where he made five League appearances and scored one goal. He finished his career in Hong Kong with Eastern AA and then with Northern Counties East club Alfreton Town, where he made 29 appearances.

== Style of play ==
Paddon was known for his creativity on the left side of midfield, with surging runs and using his powerful left foot to cross the ball into the strikers or shoot from long range. His captain at Norwich, Duncan Forbes, later remarked "He had the most fantastic left-foot. He didn't need to get very far over the halfway line before he looked up and unleashed a shot at goal. It was superb". West Ham goalkeeper Mervyn Day noted after his death that "I'll remember his dynamism, the balance he brought to the side but, above all else, the ferocity of his left foot in shooting practice".

He was also skilled at the long throw-in, Forbes commenting "he had a huge long throw. We used to practise moves at the old training pitch at Trowse. He would take the throw, I would flick it back with my head and there'd be someone coming in behind to score".

== Coaching career ==
In August 1985, Paddon joined the coaching staff at Portsmouth, working under Alan Ball. He moved to Stoke City to become Ball's assistant in October 1989. After Ball had been sacked in February 1991 Paddon was given the role as caretaker manager up until the end of the 1990–91 season. Stoke finished in 14th place in the Third Division which was unfortunately for Paddon Stoke's worst ever league finish. He returned to Portsmouth to work as Jim Smith's number two in the spring of 1991. In March 1995, the pair were sacked and Paddon later worked as a scout for Derby County, again under Jim Smith, as well as at Liverpool and Leicester City.

In 2003, Paddon joined DPMM FC in Brunei, taking charge of the team that competed in the 2005–06 Brunei Premier League.

== Death ==
Paddon died of a heart attack at his home in Norfolk on 19 November 2007.

== Career statistics ==
=== As a player ===
Club	Season	League			FA Cup		League Cup		Other^{[A]}		Total	
Club	Season	Division	Apps	Goals	Apps	Goals	Apps	Goals	Apps	Goals	Apps	Goals
Coventry City	1968–69	First Division	1	0	0	0	0	0	0	0	1	0
Coventry City	1969–70	First Division	4	1	0	0	0	0	0	0	4	1
Coventry City	Total		5	1	0	0	0	0	0	0	5	1
Norwich City	1969–70	Second Division	30	2	1	0	0	0	0	0	31	2
Norwich City	1970–71	Second Division	40	1	1	0	4	0	0	0	45	1
Norwich City	1971–72	Second Division	40	8	1	0	5	2	0	0	46	10
Norwich City	1972–73	First Division	38	7	3	0	7	5	6	0	54	12
Norwich City	1973–74	First Division	14	1	1	0	2	0	5	2	22	3
Norwich City	Total		162	19	7	0	18	7	11	2	198	28
West Ham United	1973–74	First Division	24	4	2	0	0	0	0	0	26	4
West Ham United	1974–75	First Division	40	4	8	0	3	0	3	0	54	4
West Ham United	1975–76	First Division	39	2	1	0	5	1	12	2	57	5
West Ham United	1976–77	First Division	12	1	0	0	3	1	0	0	15	2
West Ham United	Total		115	11	11	0	11	2	15	2	152	15
Norwich City	1976–77	First Division	3	0	0	0	0	0	0	0	3	0
Norwich City	1977–78	First Division	18	0	0	0	0	0	0	0	18	0
Norwich City	1978–79	First Division	17	1	0	0	0	0	0	0	17	1
Norwich City	1979–80	First Division	40	2	3	1	6	2	0	0	49	5
Norwich City	1980–81	First Division	42	3	2	0	4	0	0	0	48	3
Norwich City	1981–82	Second Division	8	0	0	0	0	0	3	0	11	0
Norwich City	Total		128	6	5	1	10	2	3	0	146	9
Tampa Bay Rowdies (loan)	1978	NASL	25	5	–		–		–		25	5
Millwall (loan)	1981–82	Third Division	5	1	0	0	0	0	0	0	5	1
Career Total			440	43	23	1	39	11	29	4	531	59

A. The "Other" column constitutes appearances and goals in the Anglo-Italian Cup, FA Charity Shield, Football League Group Cup, Texaco Cup and UEFA Cup Winners' Cup.

=== As a manager ===
Managerial record by club and tenure
Team	From	To	Record				
Team	From	To	P	W	D	L	Win %
Stoke City	24 February 1991	18 June 1991	18	6	3	9	33.3
Total			18	6	3	9	33.3

== Honours ==
Norwich City

- Football League Second Division: 1971–72
- Football League Cup runner-up: 1972–73

West Ham United

- FA Cup: 1974–75
- UEFA Cup Winners' Cup runner-up: 1975–76
