= Keith Coleman (footballer) =

English footballer

Personal information
- Full name: Keith Coleman
- Date of birth: 24 May 1951 (age 75)
- Place of birth: Washington, Tyne and Wear, England
- Position: Right back

Youth career
- Sunderland

Senior career*
Years	Team	Apps	(Gls)
1971–1973	Sunderland	49	(2)
1973–1977	West Ham	101	(0)
1977–1979	K.V. Mechelen		
1979–1980	Darlington	25	(0)
- * Club domestic league appearances and goals

Keith Coleman (born 24 May 1951) is an English retired footballer who played as a fullback. He collected an UEFA Cup Winners' Cup runners-up medal in 1976 while playing for West Ham United.

== Biography ==
Coleman was born on 24 May 1951 in Washington, Tyne and Wear. He began his career at Sunderland in 1971, where he made 49 appearances, scoring two goals. He joined West Ham in September 1973 for a transfer fee of £20,000 and made his debut in a home game against Burnley in October 1973. He competed for his position with John McDowell and Frank Lampard and made 122 appearances in all competitions, with the highlight being an appearance in the 1976 UEFA Cup Winners' Cup Final, which was won 4–2 by Anderlecht. He joined K.V. Mechelen of Belgium in 1977 and then Darlington in July 1979 where he made 25 appearances in the 1979–80 season. He took his FA coaching badge in 1980 and later was a scout for Sheffield Wednesday.
