= Keith Robson =

English footballer

Personal information
- Date of birth: 15 November 1953 (age 72)
- Place of birth: Hetton-le-Hole, County Durham, England
- Position: Midfielder

Senior career*
Years	Team	Apps	(Gls)
1971–1974	Newcastle United	14	(3)
1974–1977	West Ham United	87	(19)
1977	→ Team Hawaii (loan)	11	(4)
1977–1978	Cardiff City	21	(5)
1978–1981	Norwich City	65	(13)
1981–1983	Leicester City	9	(0)
1983	→ Carlisle United (loan)	11	(4)
- South China
- Corinthian-Casuals
- Wroxham

Managerial career
- 1993–1994: Wroxham (assistant)
- * Club domestic league appearances and goals

Keith Robson (born 15 November 1953 in Hetton-le-Hole, County Durham) is an English former professional footballer.

Robson, who was usually used as a winger or utility player, played for Newcastle United youth teams before signing with the first team in 1971. He played only fourteen games over three seasons before signing for West Ham United for £60,000 in 1974. He made his West Ham debut in a League Cup game against Tranmere Rovers on 18 September 1974.

Robson was a member of the team that finished runners-up of the European Cup Winners' Cup in 1976, scoring in the semi-final second leg game against Eintracht Frankfurt and in the final against Anderlecht. He spent time on loan with North American Soccer League team Team Hawaii for the franchise's single season under the moniker, playing with former Hammer Yılmaz Orhan. He played his last game for the east London club on 5 March 1977 against Sunderland.

Robson moved to Cardiff City in August 1977, having scored 19 goals in 87 league games for West Ham. However, his time in South Wales was plagued by disciplinary problems and, in December, he was heavily fined by the club and placed on the transfer list with manager Jimmy Andrews commenting he "had problems with the player since he came here". He went on to play for Norwich City, where he teamed up with ex-West Ham players Alan Taylor, Graham Paddon, Martin Peters and John McDowell. The £25,000 signing scored 13 goals in 65 games for the Carrow Road club before moving to Leicester City. He spent time on loan to Carlisle United where he played with another former Hammer, Pop Robson.

After a short spell in Hong Kong playing with the South China Athletic Association, Robson worked at Impress Metal Packing Co. and played for Norwich Busmen, Corinthian-Casuals and Wroxham, where he became assistant manager in 1993–94.
