= John Mitchell (footballer, born 1952) =

English footballer

Personal information
- Date of birth: 12 March 1952 (age 74)
- Place of birth: St Albans, England
- Position: Forward

Senior career*
Years	Team	Apps	(Gls)
1971–1972	St Albans City	47	(25)
1972–1978	Fulham	170	(57)
1978–1981	Millwall	81	(18)
1992–1993	St Albans City	1	(0)
Total		252	(75)
- * Club domestic league appearances and goals

John Mitchell (born 12 March 1952) is an English former footballer who played as a forward in the Football League.

At Fulham he played in the 1975 FA Cup final. During their run to the final Mitchell scored the winning goal in the last minute of extra time of the semi-final replay against Birmingham City, and he also scored in the original semi-final tie that finished 1–1.

== Honours ==
Fulham

- FA Cup runner-up: 1974–75
