= Pat Partridge =

English football referee (1933–2014)

Pat Partridge BEM
- Born: 30 June 1933; Billingham, County Durham, England
- Died: 31 October 2014 (aged 81); Cockfield, County Durham, England
- Other occupation: Farmer

Domestic
Years	League	Role
1957-58	North Eastern League	Referee
1958-65	Northern League	Referee
1965-66	Football League	Linesman
1966-81	Football League	Referee

International
Years	League	Role
1971-80	FIFA listed	Referee

Patrick Partridge (30 June 1933 – 31 October 2014) was an English football referee, and former President of the Association of Football League Referees and Linesmen. His occupation outside football was as a farmer.

== Early years ==
He originated from Billingham, County Durham, and had the same name as his father, Patrick Partridge, MBE.

== Career ==
He first became a referee in 1953, with the Durham County FA. During his period of compulsory National Service (1954–1956), he registered as an Army referee; during a military posting to Hong Kong, he was allowed to officiate in that country's Third and Fourth Divisions. Partridge returned to England and, for a short time from 1957, was appointed to referee games in the now-defunct North Eastern League. Following its disbandment in 1958, he moved to the Northern League to develop his career further. He was accepted as a Football League linesman for the 1965-66 season, and progressed to become a Football League referee in the following year.

In his 1979 co-authored biography with John Gibson, he recalled his first ever top-class Football League match as man-in-the-middle, when he awarded three penalty kicks in the game between Manchester City and Leicester City at Maine Road in March 1967, which Leicester won 3–1.

He also recounts a chain of events which led to a major change in the International Laws of Association Football. On 13 May 1967, Stoke City visited Old Trafford to play Manchester United, just after United had been confirmed as the old Division One champions. Paddy Crerand of United had an altercation with Peter Dobing of Stoke. Unknown to Partridge, TV cameras picked up Crerand's action of spitting over his shoulder at Tony Allen, another Stoke player. Partridge later received a letter from Alan Hardaker, the then secretary of the Football League, asking for his observations on the incident, but was unable to respond with conclusive evidence. Nevertheless, the International Board changed the Laws of the Game to put spitting on a par with violent conduct, and therefore a dismissible offence.

He was promoted to the FIFA list of referees in 1971, taking the place of the retiring Kevin Howley. Howley was another Teesside official who had played a key role in his early career. Just prior to this promotion the pair had run the line to Jack Taylor in the 1971 European Cup Final between Ajax and Panathinaikos at Wembley.^{‡} Although not chosen to officiate in the 1974 FIFA World Cup Finals, he did handle two friendly matches in Brazil as a precursor to that event. These were Brazil versus Czechoslovakia on 7 April 1974, and Brazil against Austria on 5 May 1974.

His greatest domestic honour was being awarded control of the 1975 FA Cup Final between West Ham and Fulham on 3 May 1975, which West Ham won 2–0, both goals being scored by Alan Taylor.

As a FIFA referee, he returned to Brazil to referee the second leg of the 1976 Intercontinental Cup in Mineirão, Belo Horizonte, between Cruzeiro and Bayern Munich. Bayern led 2-0 from the first leg, and a 0–0 draw in the latter game on 21 December 1976 meant that the German side took the Trophy that year. On 11 May 1977, he took charge of the European Cup Winners Cup Final between SV Hamburg and Anderlecht in the Olympisch Stadion, Amsterdam, which Hamburg won by 2–0.

1978 was by far Partridge's busiest year. He was appointed to that year's League Cup Final at Wembley between Nottingham Forest and Liverpool, which ended 0-0 after extra time. The replay was won 1-0 by Forest at Old Trafford from the award of a penalty kick by Partridge against Liverpool's Phil Thompson, Partridge believing Thompson's foul had taken place inside the penalty area, but television replays indicated it had not. After Partridge later compounded this error by disallowing Terry McDermott's equaliser for handball, Liverpool defender Tommy Smith famously remarked that Partridge "should be shot". This is also the match where the same player is attributed with the first use of the phrase "professional foul".

On 12 September 1978, he refereed an infamous meeting between Burnley and Celtic in the quarter final of the now-defunct Anglo-Scottish Cup, in which Steve Kindon gave Burnley the lead after 55 minutes. By the 80th minute, the mass of Celtic supporters showed their frustration to such a degree that Partridge led off both sets of players. Only a plea to the crowd from Kindon and Celtic manager Billy McNeill, at the referee's suggestion, allowed the game to resume. When it did, the score remained the same until the end.

Partridge was chosen as a FIFA representative to officiate during the 1978 World Cup Finals in Argentina. He was linesman for two matches, both in Group A: Argentina v. Hungary, which Argentina won 2–1; and France v. Hungary, which France won 3–1. He refereed just the one match in the Finals, the Second Stage Group B match between Peru and Poland, which finished 1–0 to Poland through a goal by Andrzej Szarmach.

In his book, Partridge remarked at length as to the antics of the Peruvian goalkeeper, Ramon Quiroga, during that match. Having earlier executed two perfect tackles on outfield players during the match, on or near the halfway line, Quiroga then pulled down Grzegorz Lato in his opponents' half in the second period, earning himself a caution, despite standing and bowing apologetically towards the referee after the misdemeanor.

The 1980 European Championships in Italy (the last tournament of his career) ended in his officiating in only one match throughout its duration. This was the encounter between Greece and Czechoslovakia on 14 June at the Stadio Olimpico in Rome. The Greeks lost by 3 goals to 1, finishing bottom of Group A. Partridge should have retired from refereeing directly after the Championships. However, the Football League had decided that the retirement age be raised to forty eight on an experimental basis (since confirmed).^{†} This allowed him one final season (1980–81) on the List.

== Life outside football ==
=== Before ===
Upon leaving school, he had started his professional life as an electrician, meeting his future wife Margaret at the one firm he worked for in that capacity, Head Wrightson Ltd, which operated from Thornaby at the time. They married on 11 March 1961, and by 1973 had moved to the farm in Cockfield, County Durham, which was run by Margaret's father. He and Margaret then took a full role in the running of the farm. In time, they renamed the farmhouse "Law One".

He was able to devote much more of his time to the farm business after being compulsorily required to end his involvement in football at the age of 48. He became Chairman of the Referees' Association and of the Association of Football League Referees and Linesmen, eventually taking up the position of President for the latter organisation.

He was able to concentrate on his golf as a major hobby, and joined the Celebrity Golf Tour to help raise money for charity. He also became a local magistrate and prison visitor after his refereeing career ended.

In December 2002, however, he was stricken with pneumonia - a potentially fatal condition at the age of 69. Fortunately for him, he was able to fully recover. Enough, in fact, to come out of football retirement on 19 October 2003.

As a spectator at the Northern Premier League match between Bishop Auckland and Prescot Cables, he watched as the match referee suffered an injury, causing one of his assistants to take his place in the middle. The replacement with the flag was deemed not up to the league standard, putting the future of the game in jeopardy. Having overheard all this, Partridge put himself forward to fulfill the assistant referee's duties as he had done many years ago, and ran the line in a 1–1 draw, at the age of 70 years and 4 months. This curiously mirrored the occasion in September 1972 when he refereed a match between Arsenal and Liverpool at Highbury. One of his linesmen tore a muscle and the flag was taken by TV expert, former player and qualified referee Jimmy Hill.

== Honours ==
On 11 May 2004, Partridge attended a North Riding FA dinner, at which he was honoured for 50 years membership of the Referees' Association.

He was awarded the British Empire Medal (BEM) in the 2014 Birthday Honours for services to football.

== Death ==
He died on 31 October 2014.

Preceded by UEFA Cup Winners' Cup Final 1976 (France) Robert Wurtz	UEFA Cup Winners' Cup Final Referees; Final 1977 (England) Pat Partridge	Succeeded by UEFA Cup Winners' Cup Final 1978 (West Germany) Heinz Aldinger
Preceded by Gordon Kew	FA Cup Final Referee; 1975	Succeeded by Clive Thomas
