= Les Barrett =

English footballer

Personal information
- Full name: Leslie Barrett
- Date of birth: 22 October 1947 (age 79)
- Place of birth: Wandsworth, London, England
- Position: Left winger

Senior career*
Years	Team	Apps	(Gls)
1965–1977	Fulham	424	(74)
1977–1978	Millwall	8	(1)
1978–1979	California Surf	44	(4)
1979	Woking	?	(?)
Total		476	(79)

International career
1967	England U23	1	(0)
- * Club domestic league appearances and goals

Les Barrett (born 22 October 1947) is an English former professional footballer, making the third-all-time record appearances for Fulham of 487 starts and 4 substitutions.

He scored a total of 90 goals for the club, and was the team's top scorer in Fulham's Third Division promotion season of 1970–71, with 15 goals. He was a fan-favourite at Fulham, and now lives a quiet life running a small market garden in Earlsfield. Whilst at Fulham he played in the 1975 FA Cup final.

== Honours ==
Fulham

- FA Cup runner-up: 1974–75
