= 1979–80 FA Cup =

Tournament details
- Country: England; Wales

Final positions
- Champions: West Ham United (3rd title)
- Runners-up: Arsenal

Tournament statistics
- Top goal scorer: Alan Sunderland (6 goals)

The 1979–80 FA Cup was the 99th season of the world's oldest football knockout competition, the Football Association Challenge Cup, or FA Cup. The final saw second division West Ham United defeat holders Arsenal 1–0.

== Qualifying rounds ==
Most participating clubs that were not members of the Football League competed in the qualifying rounds to secure one of 28 places available in the first round.

The winners from the fourth qualifying round were Blyth Spartans, Workington, Brandon United, Morecambe, Burscough, Mossley, Northwich Victoria, Moor Green, Nuneaton Borough, Kidderminster Harriers, AP Leamington, Enfield, Burton Albion, Harlow Town, Croydon, Wycombe Wanderers, Leytonstone & Ilford, Wealdstone, Barking, Chesham United, Gravesend & Northfleet, Merthyr Tydfil, Slough Town, Minehead, Fareham Town, Salisbury, Hungerford Town and Yeovil Town.

Appearing in the competition proper for the first time were Brandon United, Moor Green, Harlow Town, Croydon, Fareham Town and Hungerford Town, while the recently amalgamated Leytonstone & Ilford was appearing for the first time since Ilford had featured in the first and second rounds of the 1974–75 tournament after being a finalist in the last-ever FA Amateur Cup final held at the end of the previous season. Of the others, Kidderminster Harriers had last featured at this stage in 1968–69 and Salisbury had last done so in 1967–68.

Harlow Town participated in nine rounds of the tournament, overcoming Lowestoft Town, Hornchurch, Bury Town, Harwich & Parkeston, Margate, Leytonstone & Ilford, Southend United and (notably) Leicester City before Watford ended their run with a high-scoring defeat at Vicarage Road.

== First round proper ==
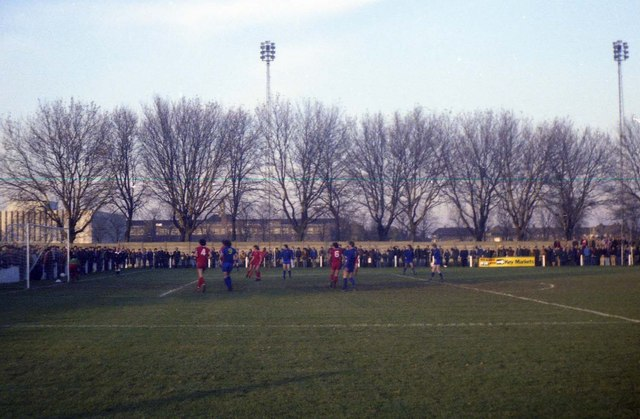
Mayesbrook Park hosting the first round match between Barking and Oxford United.

The 48 teams from the Football League Third and Fourth Divisions entered in this round along with the 28 non-league clubs from the qualifying rounds and Stafford Rangers, Kettering Town, Altrincham and Scarborough who were given byes. Ten teams from the new Alliance Premier League (later to be known as Conference National and the National League) qualified for this round, while Brandon United, from the Northern Alliance, was ostensibly the lowest-ranked club remaining in the competition.

The first round of games were played on 24 November 1979. Replays were played on 26–28 November.

Tie no	Home team	Score	Away team	Date
1	Enfield (6)	0–1	Yeovil Town (5)	24 November 1979
2	Blackpool	1–1	Wigan Athletic	24 November 1979
Replay	Wigan Athletic	2–0	Blackpool	28 November 1979
3	Chester	5–1	Workington (6)	24 November 1979
4	Darlington	1–1	Huddersfield Town	24 November 1979
Replay	Huddersfield Town	0–1	Darlington	27 November 1979
5	Barking (6)	1–0	Oxford United	24 November 1979
6	Rochdale	2–1	Scunthorpe United	24 November 1979
7	Reading	4–2	Kettering Town (5)	24 November 1979
8	Walsall	2–0	Stockport County	24 November 1979
9	Gillingham	0–0	Wimbledon	24 November 1979
Replay	Wimbledon	4–2	Gillingham	27 November 1979
10	Sheffield Wednesday	3–0	Lincoln City	24 November 1979
11	Grimsby Town	1–1	Chesterfield	24 November 1979
Replay	Chesterfield	2–3	Grimsby Town	27 November 1979
12	Stafford Rangers (5)	3–2	Moor Green (8)	24 November 1979
13	Swindon Town	4–1	Brentford	24 November 1979
14	Sheffield United	3–0	Burscough (8)	24 November 1979
15	Tranmere Rovers	9–0	AP Leamington (5)	24 November 1979
16	Wycombe Wanderers (6)	0–3	Croydon (6)	24 November 1979
17	Kidderminster Harriers (6)	0–2	Blackburn Rovers	24 November 1979
18	Barnsley	5–2	Hartlepool United	24 November 1979
19	Portsmouth	1–0	Newport County	24 November 1979
20	Carlisle United	3–3	Hull City	24 November 1979
Replay	Hull City	0–2	Carlisle United	28 November 1979
21	Altrincham (5)	3–0	Crewe Alexandra	24 November 1979
22	Blyth Spartans (8)	0–2	Mansfield Town	24 November 1979
23	Port Vale	1–3	Doncaster Rovers	23 November 1979
24	Minehead (6)	1–2	Chesham United (7)	24 November 1979
25	Halifax Town	2–0	Scarborough (5)	24 November 1979
26	Wealdstone (5)	0–1	Southend United	24 November 1979
27	Morecambe (6)	1–1	Rotherham United	24 November 1979
Replay	Rotherham United	2–0	Morecambe (6)	27 November 1979
28	York City	5–2	Mossley (6)	24 November 1979
29	Hereford United	1–0	Northampton Town	24 November 1979
30	Aldershot	4–1	Exeter City	24 November 1979
31	Peterborough United	1–2	AFC Bournemouth	24 November 1979
32	Harlow Town (6)	2–1	Leytonstone & Ilford (7)	24 November 1979
33	Colchester United	1–1	Plymouth Argyle	24 November 1979
Replay	Plymouth Argyle	0–1	Colchester United	27 November 1979
34	Nuneaton Borough (5)	3–3	Northwich Victoria (5)	24 November 1979
Replay	Northwich Victoria (5)	3–0	Nuneaton Borough (5)	26 November 1979
35	Gravesend & Northfleet (5)	0–1	Torquay United	24 November 1979
36	Salisbury (6)	1–2	Millwall	24 November 1979
37	Slough Town (6)	3–1	Hungerford Town (8)	24 November 1979
38	Burton Albion (6)	0–2	Bury	24 November 1979
39	Fareham Town (6)	2–3	Merthyr Tydfil (6)	24 November 1979
40	Brandon United (9)	0–3	Bradford City	24 November 1979

== Second round proper ==
The second round of games were intended to be played on 15 December 1979, but some matches were not played until 17–19 December and one was postponed until 5 January 1980. Replays took place at various dates after these games. Chesham United, from the Isthmian League First Division, was the lowest-ranked club in the round.

Tie no	Home team	Score	Away team	Date
1	Chester	1–0	Barnsley	18 December 1979
2	Croydon (6)	1–1	Millwall	15 December 1979
Replay	Millwall	3–2	Croydon (6)	18 December 1979
3	Darlington	0–1	Bradford City	15 December 1979
4	Bury	0–0	York City	15 December 1979
Replay	York City	0–2	Bury	18 December 1979
5	Yeovil Town (5)	1–0	Slough Town (6)	15 December 1979
6	Reading	3–1	Barking (6)	15 December 1979
7	Walsall	1–1	Halifax Town	15 December 1979
Replay	Halifax Town	1–1	Walsall	18 December 1979
Replay	Halifax Town	2–0	Walsall	24 December 1979
8	Blackburn Rovers	2–0	Stafford Rangers (5)	17 December 1979
9	Grimsby Town	2–0	Sheffield United	15 December 1979
10	Northwich Victoria (5)	2–2	Wigan Athletic	5 January 1980
Replay	Wigan Athletic	1–0	Northwich Victoria (5)	7 January 1980
11	Doncaster Rovers	1–2	Mansfield Town	15 December 1979
12	Tranmere Rovers	2–2	Rochdale	15 December 1979
Replay	Rochdale	2–1	Tranmere Rovers	18 December 1979
13	Carlisle United	3–0	Sheffield Wednesday	15 December 1979
14	Wimbledon	0–0	Portsmouth	18 December 1979
Replay	Portsmouth	3–3	Wimbledon	24 December 1979
Replay	Wimbledon	0–1	Portsmouth	5 January 1980
15	Southend United	1–1	Harlow Town (6)	15 December 1979
Replay	Harlow Town (6)	1–0	Southend United	18 December 1979
16	Chesham United (7)	1–1	Merthyr Tydfil (6)	19 December 1979
Replay	Merthyr Tydfil (6)	1–3	Chesham United (7)	22 December 1979
17	Torquay United	3–3	Swindon Town	18 December 1979
Replay	Swindon Town	3–2	Torquay United	22 December 1979
18	Hereford United	1–2	Aldershot	15 December 1979
19	Rotherham United	0–2	Altrincham (5)	15 December 1979
20	Colchester United	1–0	AFC Bournemouth	15 December 1979

== Third round proper ==
Teams from the Football League First and Second Division entered in this round. The third round of games in the FA Cup were mainly played on 5 January 1980, with some games taking place on 8–9 January and one on 14. Replays were intended for 8–9 January but again took place at various times. From Step 7 of the fledgling English Football Pyramid, Chesham United was again the lowest-ranked club in the round.

Tie no	Home team	Score	Away team	Date
1	Bristol City	6–2	Derby County	5 January 1980
2	Burnley	1–0	Stoke City	5 January 1980
3	Liverpool	5–0	Grimsby Town	5 January 1980
4	Preston North End	0–3	Ipswich Town	5 January 1980
5	Rochdale	1–1	Bury	8 January 1980
Replay	Bury	3–2	Rochdale	21 January 1980
6	Yeovil Town (5)	0–3	Norwich City	5 January 1980
7	Reading	2–0	Colchester United	5 January 1980
8	Leicester City	1–1	Harlow Town (6)	5 January 1980
Replay	Harlow Town (6)	1–0	Leicester City	8 January 1980
9	Notts County	1–3	Wolverhampton Wanderers	5 January 1980
10	Blackburn Rovers	1–1	Fulham	8 January 1980
Replay	Fulham	0–1	Blackburn Rovers	15 January 1980
11	West Bromwich Albion	1–1	West Ham United	5 January 1980
Replay	West Ham United	2–1	West Bromwich Albion	8 January 1980
12	Sunderland	0–1	Bolton Wanderers	5 January 1980
13	Luton Town	0–2	Swindon Town	5 January 1980
14	Everton	4–1	Aldershot	5 January 1980
15	Wrexham	6–0	Charlton Athletic	5 January 1980
16	Newcastle United	0–2	Chester	5 January 1980
17	Tottenham Hotspur	1–1	Manchester United	5 January 1980
Replay	Manchester United	0–1	Tottenham Hotspur	9 January 1980
18	Queens Park Rangers	1–2	Watford	5 January 1980
19	Bristol Rovers	1–2	Aston Villa	4 January 1980
20	Portsmouth	1–1	Middlesbrough	9 January 1980
Replay	Middlesbrough	3–0	Portsmouth	14 January 1980
21	Millwall	5–1	Shrewsbury Town	5 January 1980
22	Carlisle United	3–2	Bradford City	5 January 1980
23	Oldham Athletic	0–1	Coventry City	5 January 1980
24	Chelsea	0–1	Wigan Athletic	14 January 1980
25	Altrincham (5)	1–1	Orient	5 January 1980
Replay	Orient	2–1	Altrincham (5)	9 January 1980
26	Mansfield Town	0–2	Brighton & Hove Albion	5 January 1980
27	Cardiff City	0–0	Arsenal	5 January 1980
Replay	Arsenal	2–1	Cardiff City	8 January 1980
28	Halifax Town	1–0	Manchester City	5 January 1980
29	Chesham United (7)	0–2	Cambridge United	5 January 1980
30	Leeds United	1–4	Nottingham Forest	5 January 1980
31	Birmingham City	2–1	Southampton	5 January 1980
32	Swansea City	2–2	Crystal Palace	5 January 1980
Replay	Crystal Palace	3–3	Swansea City	8 January 1980
Replay	Swansea City	2–1	Crystal Palace	14 January 1980

== Fourth round proper ==
The fourth round of games were mainly played on 26 January 1980. Replays were played on 29 and 30 January. Harlow Town was the last non-league club left in the competition.

Tie no	Home team	Score	Away team	Date
1	Chester	2–0	Millwall	26 January 1980
2	Bristol City	1–2	Ipswich Town	26 January 1980
3	Bury	1–0	Burnley	26 January 1980
4	Watford	4–3	Harlow Town (6)	26 January 1980
5	Nottingham Forest	0–2	Liverpool	26 January 1980
6	Blackburn Rovers	1–0	Coventry City	26 January 1980
7	Bolton Wanderers	2–0	Halifax Town	26 January 1980
8	Wolverhampton Wanderers	1–1	Norwich City	26 January 1980
Replay	Norwich City	2–3	Wolverhampton Wanderers	30 January 1980
9	Everton	3–0	Wigan Athletic	26 January 1980
10	Swindon Town	0–0	Tottenham Hotspur	26 January 1980
Replay	Tottenham Hotspur	2–1	Swindon Town	30 January 1980
11	Carlisle United	0–0	Wrexham	26 January 1980
Replay	Wrexham	3–1	Carlisle United	29 January 1980
12	Arsenal	2–0	Brighton & Hove Albion	26 January 1980
13	Birmingham City	2–1	Middlesbrough	26 January 1980
14	Cambridge United	1–1	Aston Villa	26 January 1980
Replay	Aston Villa	4–1	Cambridge United	30 January 1980
15	Orient	2–3	West Ham United	26 January 1980
16	Swansea City	4–1	Reading	26 January 1980

== Fifth round proper ==
The fifth set of games were all played on 16 February 1980. Two replays were played on 19 and 20 February.

Tie no	Home team	Score	Away team	Date
1	Liverpool	2–0	Bury	16 February 1980
2	Blackburn Rovers	1–1	Aston Villa	16 February 1980
Replay	Aston Villa	1–0	Blackburn Rovers	20 February 1980
3	Bolton Wanderers	1–1	Arsenal	16 February 1980
Replay	Arsenal	3–0	Bolton Wanderers	19 February 1980
4	Wolverhampton Wanderers	0–3	Watford	16 February 1980
5	Everton	5–2	Wrexham	16 February 1980
6	Ipswich Town	2–1	Chester	16 February 1980
7	Tottenham Hotspur	3–1	Birmingham City	16 February 1980
8	West Ham United	2–0	Swansea City	16 February 1980

== Sixth round proper ==
The sixth round of games were played on 8 March 1980. There were no replays.

Tie no	Home team	Score	Away team	Date
1	Watford	1–2	Arsenal	8 March 1980
2	Everton	2–1	Ipswich Town	8 March 1980
3	Tottenham Hotspur	0–1	Liverpool	8 March 1980
4	West Ham United	1–0	Aston Villa	8 March 1980

== Semi finals ==
12 April 1980

Liverpool	0–0	Arsenal
	Report

Hillsborough, Sheffield
Referee: Keith Hackett, South Yorkshire

12 April 1980

West Ham United	1–1	Everton
Pearson 71'	Report	Kidd 42' (pen.); Kidd s/off 63'

Villa Park, Birmingham
Referee: Colin Seel, Carlisle

=== Replays ===
16 April 1980

Liverpool	1–1 (a.e.t.)	Arsenal
Fairclough 51'	Report	Sunderland 62'

Villa Park, Birmingham
Attendance: 40,579
Referee: Keith Hackett, South Yorkshire

16 April 1980
19:30 BST

West Ham United	2–1 (a.e.t.)	Everton
Devonshire 94'; Lampard 119'	Report	Latchford 114'

Elland Road, Leeds
Attendance: 40,720
Referee: C. Seel, Carlisle

=== Second replay ===
28 April 1980

Liverpool	1–1 (a.e.t.)	Arsenal
Dalglish 90+1'	Report	Sunderland 1'

Villa Park, Birmingham
Attendance: 42,975
Referee: Pat Partridge, County Durham

=== Third replay ===
1 May 1980

Liverpool	0–1	Arsenal
	Report	Talbot 11'

Highfield Road, Coventry
Attendance: 35,335
Referee: Pat Partridge, County Durham

== Final ==
10 May 1980

West Ham United	1–0	Arsenal
Brooking 13'

Wembley, London
Attendance: 100,000
Referee: George Courtney (County Durham)

West Ham	Arsenal

== Television coverage ==
The right to show FA Cup games were, as with Football League matches, shared between the BBC and ITV network. All games were shown in a highlights format, except the Final, which was shown live both on BBC1 and ITV. The BBC football highlights programme Match of the Day would show up to three games and the various ITV regional network stations would cover up to one game and show highlights from other games covered elsewhere on the ITV network. No games from Rounds 1 or 2 were shown. Occasional highlights of replays would be shown on either the BBC or ITV.

This was the first season of a 4-year deal between the FA/Football League and BBC/ITV where BBC and ITV would alternate between Saturday nights and Sunday afternoons for highlights. This season it was as it was under the previous contracts from 1964 to 1979 Saturday nights BBC1 and Sunday afternoons ITV.

These matches were.

Round	BBC1	ITV
Third round proper	Leeds United vs Nottingham Forest; Cardiff City vs Arsenal; Yeovil Town vs Norwich City^{1} Manchester United vs Tottenham Hotspur (replay)^{1}	Tottenham Hotspur vs Manchester United – LWT ^{1} Burnley vs Stoke City – Granada; Sunderland vs Bolton Wanderers – Tyne Tees; Halifax Town vs Manchester City – Yorkshire ^{1} Birmingham City vs Southampton – ATV
Fourth round proper	Nottingham Forest v Liverpool; Wolverhampton Wanderers vs Norwich City; Harlow Town vs Watford ^{1}	Arsenal vs Brighton & Hove Albion – LWT; Everton vs Wigan Athletic – Granada; Bolton Wanderers vs Halifax Town – Yorkshire; Swindon Town vs Tottenham Hotspur – ATV; Cambridge United vs Aston Villa – Anglia; Tottenham Hotspur vs Swindon Town (Replay)
Fifth round proper	Wolverhampton Wanderers v Watford; Blackburn Rovers vs Aston Villa; Everton vs Wrexham; Aston Villa vs Blackburn Rovers (Replay)	Tottenham Hotspur vs Birmingham City – LWT; Bolton Wanderers vs Arsenal – Granada; Ipswich Town vs Chester – Anglia
Sixth round proper	Tottenham Hotspur vs Liverpool; Watford vs Arsenal	West Ham United vs Aston Villa – LWT ^{1} Everton vs Ipswich Town – Granada ^{1}
Semi-finals	West Ham United vs Everton ^{1} Arsenal vs Liverpool (Replay); West Ham United vs Everton (Replay) ^{1}	Arsenal vs Liverpool; Arsenal vs Liverpool (2nd Replay); Arsenal vs Liverpool (3rd Replay)
Final	Arsenal vs West Ham United ^{1}	Arsenal vs West Ham United ^{1}

^{1}Footage available on YouTube
