= Michel Lomme =

Belgian footballer (born 1955)

Personal information
- Date of birth: 16 September 1955 (age 71)
- Place of birth: Uccle, Belgium
- Position: Right-back

Senior career*
| Years | Team | Apps | (Gls) |
| 1975–1977 | Anderlecht | | |
| 1977–1978 | Union Saint-Gilloise | | |
| 1978–1979 | Anderlecht | | |
| 1979–1980 | Union Saint-Gilloise | | |
| 1980–? | KSK Halle | | |
- * Club domestic league appearances and goals

Michel Lomme (born 16 September 1955) is a Belgian former professional footballer who played as right-back. He played in the final of the 1975–76 European Cup Winners' Cup against West Ham United.

== Honours ==
Anderlecht

- Belgian Cup: 1975–76
- European Cup Winners' Cup: 1975–76; runner-up 1976-77
- European Super Cup: 1976
- Amsterdam Tournament: 1976
- Jules Pappaert Cup: 1977
- Belgian Sports Merit Award: 1978
