= Alan Taylor (footballer, born 1953) =

English footballer (born 1953)

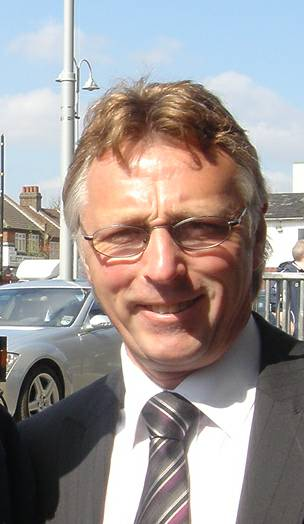
- Taylor at the Boleyn Ground in 2009

Personal information
- Full name: Alan David Taylor
- Date of birth: 14 November 1953 (age 73)
- Place of birth: Hinckley, England
- Height: 5 ft 7 in (1.70 m)
- Position: Striker

Senior career*
Years	Team	Apps	(Gls)
1973–1974	Rochdale	55	(8)
1974–1979	West Ham United	98	(25)
1979–1980	Norwich City	24	(5)
1980	Vancouver Whitecaps	26	(11)
1980–1981	Cambridge United	18	(4)
1981–1984	Vancouver Whitecaps	23	(10)
1984	Hull City	14	(3)
1984–1986	Burnley	64	(23)
1986–1988	Bury	62	(10)
1988	Norwich City	4	(1)
Total		388	(100)
- * Club domestic league appearances and goals

Alan David Taylor (born 14 November 1953) is an English former professional footballer best known for his goalscoring exploits with West Ham United in their FA Cup success of 1975, culminating in two goals in that season's final.

== Early career ==
Taylor was born in Hinckley in Leicestershire but when he was a child, his family moved to Lancashire. His career in football started as a youth player at Preston North End but he was released in 1970 following the club's relegation. He then took up a job in car repairs while playing non-league football in Lancashire. Eventually his reputation with Morecambe as a goalscorer prompted Rochdale into making a move for him, taking Taylor into the full-time game for the first time.

== West Ham United ==
=== First season ===
At the end of 1974, West Ham manager John Lyall signed Taylor for £40,000. He was able to play in West Ham's FA Cup campaign when they joined the competition at the third round stage in January 1975, even though Rochdale's lower league status meant that they had started two rounds earlier. Taylor had been injured during Rochdale's FA Cup matches and was therefore not cup-tied. West Ham progressed to the quarter finals and on 8 March 1975 Taylor scored both goals, in what was only his fifth West Ham game, as they beat Arsenal 2–0 at Highbury. The semi-final against Ipswich Town ended goalless and went to a replay at Stamford Bridge on 9 April 1975, with Taylor again scoring both goals in a 2–1 win, the second of which clinched a place in the Wembley final with just eight minutes to go. In the final on 3 May 1975, West Ham played Fulham, who were a division below them, and the game was tightly-contested until Taylor scored two goals which won West Ham the FA Cup. In the 61st minute, Billy Jennings hit a low, outswinging shot from 25 yards which Fulham goalkeeper Peter Mellor could only parry across his goal. Taylor, following up, had to check his run to reach the rebound, but managed to get his foot around the ball and place a low drive through Mellor's legs and into the net. Three minutes later, Graham Paddon again hit a shot from a wide left position at the Fulham goal, but this time it was more directly at Mellor, who stopped it but failed to hold on. Once more, Taylor was following up and he guided the rebound into the top of the net. Taylor made headlines as West Ham won 2–0, especially as he had scored three consecutive FA Cup braces and had been a player in the Fourth Division just six months previously. He was the subject of "rags to riches"-style features in the press after the final.

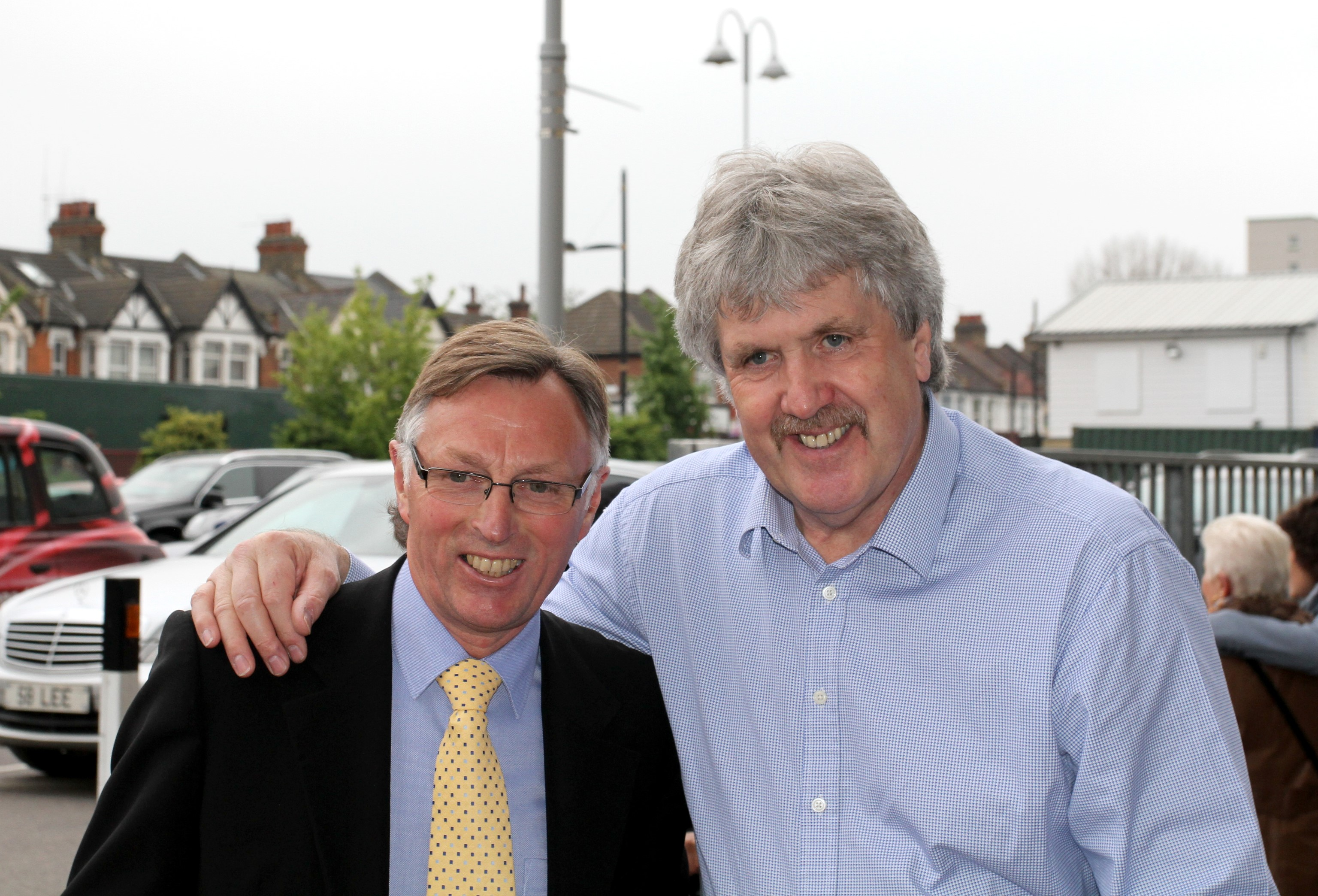
Alan Taylor with fellow ex-Hammer Phil Parkes at Upton Park 2 May 2015

=== 1975–76 European Cup Winner's Cup ===
The following season Taylor played in West Ham's 1975-76 UEFA Cup Winners' Cup campaign. He scored their goal in an away 1–1 draw with Ararat Erevan in the second round on 22 October 1975, in a 3–1 home win against the same team on 5 November 1975 and in the 3–1 home win against Den Haag in the third round on 17 March 1976. West Ham made the 1976 UEFA Cup Winners' Cup Final but lost 4–2 to Anderlecht in the Heysel Stadium. Taylor made a substitute appearance coming on for Frank Lampard.

=== Later West Ham career ===
The 1975–76 season had seen Taylor finish as West Ham's top scorer with 17 goals from 50 games. In the following three seasons he played many fewer games and scored few goals. In the 1978–79 season, his final season, he managed only 15 games and three goals. He played his final West Ham game on 5 May 1979 in a 1–0 away defeat to Blackburn Rovers, coming on as a substitute for John McDowell. He had played 124 games in all competitions scoring 36 goals.

== Around the clubs ==
Injuries took their toll on Taylor afterwards and he lost his place at West Ham, who were relegated in 1978. Taylor left for Norwich City in 1979, and had subsequent periods at Cambridge United, Hull City, Burnley and Bury, plus some time in Canada at Vancouver Whitecaps. He ended his career back at Norwich.

== Legacy ==
It took eleven years before another player — Ian Rush in 1986 – scored two goals in the FA Cup Final, although two (Ricardo Villa in 1981 and Bryan Robson in 1983) had done so in replays in the interim.

== Honours ==
West Ham United

- FA Cup: 1974–75
- European Cup Winners' Cup runner-up: 1975–76

Hull City

- Associate Members' Cup runner-up: 1983–84
