= Paul Brush =

English footballer (born 1958)

Personal information
- Date of birth: 22 February 1958 (age 68)
- Place of birth: Plaistow, England
- Height: 5 ft 11 in (1.80 m)
- Position: Full-back

Youth career
- West Ham United

Senior career*
Years	Team	Apps	(Gls)
1977–1985	West Ham United	151	(1)
1985–1988	Crystal Palace	50	(3)
1987–1990	Southend United	73	(1)
- Enfield
1993–1994	Chelmsford City	12	(0)
- Heybridge Swifts
Total		286	(5)

Managerial career
- 2001–2003: Leyton Orient
- * Club domestic league appearances and goals

Paul Brush (born 22 February 1958) is an English former professional footballer and coach who played in the Football League for West Ham United, Crystal Palace and Southend United. He is best known for his time with West Ham United, for whom he played from 1976 until 1985.

== Playing career ==
Brush came through West Ham United's academy to make his first-team debut as a 19-year-old, on 20 August 1977 in a 3–1 defeat against Norwich City in the First Division. He was an unused substitute for West Ham in the 1980 FA Cup Final at Wembley Stadium, when the Hammers became the last team (as of 2023) from outside the top flight to win the trophy. He was able to appear at Wembley just a few months later in the starting eleven for West Ham in the Charity Shield against Liverpool. In all, he made 151 League appearances for the east London club and scored one goal (against Queens Park Rangers on 1 January 1985), before leaving the club in September 1985 for Crystal Palace. He spent three seasons with Palace, followed by another three with Southend United, then moved into non-league football with clubs including Enfield, Chelmsford City and Heybridge Swifts.

== Coaching career ==
Brush joined Leyton Orient as youth coach in 1994, was appointed manager in October 2001, and was sacked after two years in charge with the club second bottom of the league. Steve Tilson, appointed manager of Southend United in late 2003, brought in Brush as his assistant, and the pair led the club to two successive promotions, from League Two to the Championship. After not recording a league win in 2010, the club slipped into the League One relegation zone and he was sacked as assistant manager on 8 March. Chairman Ron Martin stated he wanted a positive approach to the on-field activities. The next day former manager David Webb replaced Brush until the end of the season.

On 15 October 2010, he renewed his partnership with Tilson when he was appointed assistant manager at Lincoln City upon Tilson's appointment as manager. In October 2011 both Tilson and Brush were sacked by Lincoln City.

In 2012 Brush became an academy development coach at Tottenham Hotspur. From 2021 he has been a self-employed coach and scout and is a scout for Cambridge United.

== Honours ==
West Ham United

- FA Cup: 1979–80
