= Bobby Ferguson (footballer, born 1945) =

Scottish footballer

Personal information
- Full name: Robert Ferguson
- Date of birth: 1 March 1945 (age 81)
- Place of birth: Ardrossan, Scotland
- Position: Goalkeeper

Senior career*
Years	Team	Apps	(Gls)
1964–1967	Kilmarnock	73	(0)
1967–1980	West Ham United	240	(0)
1974	→ Sheffield Wednesday (loan)	5	(0)
1982	Adelaide City	22	(0)
Total		340	(0)

International career
1965–1966	Scotland	7	(0)
1966–1967	Scottish Football League XI	2	(0)
- * Club domestic league appearances and goals

Robert Ferguson (born 1 March 1945) is a Scottish former footballer, who played as a goalkeeper.

== Football career ==
=== Kilmarnock ===
Born in Ardrossan, Ferguson came through Willie Waddell's Kilmarnock youth system in the early 1960s. Ferguson took over in the first-team following an injury to Campbell Forsyth in 1964–65. He retained the goalkeeper's shirt for the remainder of the season, playing eight games and keeping four clean sheets.

In 1964–65 Heart of Midlothian F.C. fought out a championship title race with Waddell's Kilmarnock. In the era of two points for a win Hearts were three points clear with two games remaining. Hearts drew with Dundee United meaning the last game of the season with the two title challengers playing each other at Tynecastle would be a league decider. Kilmarnock needed to win by a two-goal margin to take the title. Hearts entered the game as favourites with both a statistical and home advantage. They also had a solid pedigree of trophy winning under Walker. Waddell's Kilmarnock in contrast had been nearly men. Four times in the previous five seasons they had finished league runners-up including Hearts' triumph in 1960. Killie had also lost three domestic cup finals during the same period including the 1962 League Cup Final defeat to Hearts. Hearts had won five of the six senior cup finals they played in under Walker. Even the final they had lost was in a replay after drawing the first game. Hearts' Roald Jensen hit the post after six minutes. Kilmarnock then scored twice through Davie Sneddon and Brian McIlroy after 27 and 29 minutes. Alan Gordon had an excellent chance to clinch the title for Hearts in second half injury time but was denied by a Ferguson diving save pushing the ball past the post. The 2–0 defeat meant Hearts lost the title by an average of 0.042 goals. Subsequently, Hearts were instrumental in pushing through a change to use goal difference to separate teams level on points. Ironically this rule change later denied Hearts the title in 1985–86. This is the only time to date Killie's have been Scottish champions.

Ferguson went on to make 73 league appearances for the club. During his time with Kilmarnock he won seven caps for Scotland.

=== West Ham United including Sheffield Wednesday loan ===
Ferguson was transferred east London club West Ham United for a fee of £65,000 in 1967, which at the time was a world record fee for a goalkeeper. He made his Hammers debut against Sheffield Wednesday on 19 August 1967, the first game of the 1967–68 season. Despite having to compete for the number one shirt with Peter Grotier and Mervyn Day, Ferguson still managed 276 appearances during his 13 years at West Ham. He spent time with Sheffield Wednesday on loan in 1973, making five appearances for them. The signing of Phil Parkes in February 1979 ultimately meant the end of his career at West Ham. He played his last game for the Upton Park club in a 2–1 defeat on 14 November 1979 against Chelsea, and left in 1980. He received a testimonial match in 1981, against Southampton, for which he earned £20,000. He also played reserve team football for West Ham as a winger.

== Adelaide City ==
In 1981 Ferguson emigrated to Australia. He played with Adelaide City for one year and then coached the club the following year. He later coached with Vacation Soccer Schools and Burnside Rugby Club.

== Career after football ==
In 1982, Ferguson ran a diving firm for six years, but gave up when a colleague was attacked by a shark.

== Honours ==
Kilmarnock

- Scottish league champions: 1964–65
