= Tommy Taylor (footballer, born 1951) =

English footballer and manager

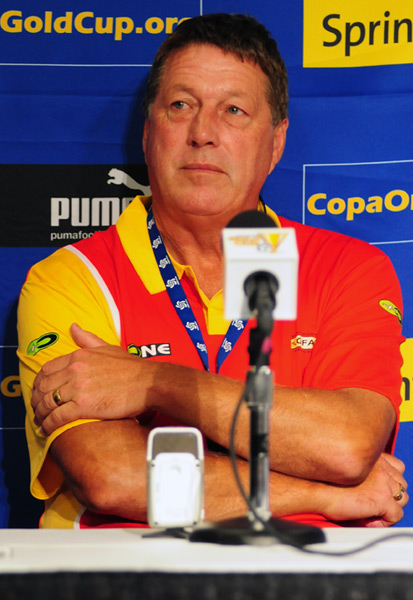

Personal information
- Full name: Thomas Frederick Taylor
- Date of birth: 26 September 1951 (age 75)
- Place of birth: Hornchurch, Essex, England
- Position: Defender

Senior career*
Years	Team	Apps	(Gls)
1966–1970	Leyton Orient	114	(4)
1970–1979	West Ham United	140	(8)
1977	→ Team Hawaii (loan)	19	(0)
1979–1982	Leyton Orient	116	(5)
1982–1983	Beerschot	27	(0)
Total		616	(17)

International career
1967	England Schoolboys	6	(0)
1969–1970	England Youth	7	(0)
1972–1975	England U23	11	(0)

Managerial career
- 1991: Margate
- 1995–1996: Cambridge United
- 1996–2001: Leyton Orient
- 2001–2002: Darlington
- 2003: Farnborough Town
- 2004–2006: King's Lynn
- 2007: Peterborough United (caretaker)
- 2007–2008: Boston United
- 2009–2010: Grenada
- 2010: CD Torrevieja
- 2011: Belper Town
- 2013–2014: PS Kemi Kings
- 2015–2016: Fløy
- 2022: Europa Point
- * Club domestic league appearances and goals

Thomas Frederick Taylor (born 26 September 1951) is an English football manager and former footballer. As a footballer, he played as a defender.

== Playing career ==
Taylor played for Leyton Orient, helping them to promotion to Division Two, and captained the England youth team. He won 13 caps for the England Under-23 team, but never made a senior appearance.

Taylor joined West Ham United in October 1970 and was a member of the team that won the FA Cup in 1975. In 1977, he played for Team Hawaii of North American Soccer League from May to August of this year on loan from West Ham. He returned to Orient in 1979 after losing his place in the Hammers side to Alvin Martin. He played a total of 396 games and scored eight goals for the Hammers.

Taylor had a spell in Belgium with K Beerschot.

== Managerial career ==
Taylor joined Charlton Athletic as youth coach. He moved into football management in New Zealand for three years, then joined Maidstone United as a coach in 1989.

Taylor became youth team manager at Cambridge United in 1993 and went on to manage the first team in 1995. A year later, he returned to Brisbane Road to manage Leyton Orient.

In 2001, after five years at the club, he left Leyton Orient and joined Darlington, leaving in October 2002. Taylor then joined Conference side Farnborough Town, officially taking on the manager's role in May 2003.

In November 2004, Taylor was appointed manager at King's Lynn. In 2006, he joined rivals Peterborough United as assistant to Keith Alexander. At the time of his departure King's Lynn were top of the Southern League. On 15 January 2007, following the departure of Alexander, he was appointed caretaker manager. With the job going to Darren Ferguson five days later, Taylor became number two once again, after overseeing one loss for the club.

In July 2007 he left Peterborough to become manager of Boston United, who had recently been double-relegated from League Two to the Conference North.

Taylor was appointed manager of the Grenada national football team in May 2009. His first game in charge of Grenada was a friendly against Panama on 10 June 2009. Taylor contacted Blackburn Rovers' Jason Roberts, Leeds United's Jermaine Beckford and Southampton's Bradley Wright-Phillips in the hope of convincing the players to become eligible for Grenada. He led Grenada during their first CONCACAF Gold Cup appearance in 2009, where they were knocked out at the group stage.

He joined CD Torrevieja, in Alicante, Spain, as Director of Football, in January 2010 but left three months later.

In May 2011 he was appointed as manager of Belper Town. In September of that year Taylor resigned as Belper manager after a poor start to the season which saw them exit the FA Cup to lower level opponents.

In 2013, Taylor was appointed as a manager of PS Kemi Kings who play in the Kakkonen, Finland's third tier.

In June 2019, Taylor was appointed as director of football for Histon.

== Honours ==
West Ham United

- FA Cup: 1974–75
