= Geoff Pike =

English footballer

Personal information
- Full name: Geoffrey Alan Pike
- Date of birth: 28 September 1956 (age 70)
- Place of birth: Lower Clapton, London, England
- Height: 5 ft 9 in (1.75 m)
- Position: Midfielder

Youth career
- Gidea Park Rangers
- West Ham United

Senior career*
Years	Team	Apps	(Gls)
1974–1987	West Ham United	291	(32)
1976	→ Hartford Bicentennials (loan)	19	(4)
1977	→ Connecticut Bicentennials (loan)	20	(3)
1987–1989	Notts County	82	(17)
1989–1991	Leyton Orient	44	(1)
- Fisher Athletic
1995–1996	Hendon	11	(0)
Total		467	(57)
- * Club domestic league appearances and goals

Geoffrey Alan Pike (born 28 September 1956) is an English former footballer who played as a midfielder. He spent the majority of his career at West Ham United.

Pike played his early football in Thurrock and later with Gidea Park Rangers. He joined West Ham United in 1974 and was a member of the side that reached the 1975 FA Youth Cup Final. He made his league debut on 6 March 1976 against Birmingham City. In 1976, West Ham loaned him to the Hartford Bicentennials of the North American Soccer League. He returned on loan in 1977, but by that time the team had moved and was now known as the Connecticut Bicentennials.

He played for the Upton Park club for twelve years, gaining an FA Cup winners medal in 1980, a League Cup runners-up medal in 1981 and promotion back to the top tier, after finishing as Division Two champions in 1980–81. Pike also featured in the side that finished third in the Football League First Division in 1985-86, just 4 points off the league title, which remains West Ham's highest ever league finish. He amassed 372 appearances and 41 goals for West Ham in all competitions, until his departure in 1987.

He qualified for the UEFA Pro Licence in 2004.

== Honours ==
West Ham United

- FA Cup: 1979–80
- Football League Cup runner-up: 1980–81

Individual

- PFA Team of the Year: 1987–88 Third Division
