= Pat Holland =

English footballer & manager (born 1950)

Personal information
- Full name: Patrick George Holland
- Date of birth: 13 September 1950 (age 76)
- Place of birth: Poplar, London, England
- Position: Winger

Senior career*
Years	Team	Apps	(Gls)
1969–1981	West Ham United	245	(23)
1971	→ Bournemouth & Boscombe Athletic (loan)	10	(0)
1977	→ Team Hawaii (loan)	16	(4)
Total		261	(27)

Managerial career
- 1988–1995: Tottenham Hotspur (Reserves)
- 1995–1997: Leyton Orient
- 1997–2006: Tottenham Hotspur (Academy)
- 2012: Arsenal U18
- * Club domestic league appearances and goals

Patrick "Patsy" Holland (born 13 September 1950) is an English former footballer who played for clubs West Ham United, Bournemouth & Boscombe Athletic and Team Hawaii. Holland has also coached and scouted for teams such as Leyton Orient, Tottenham Hotspur, Queens Park Rangers and Arsenal.

== Career ==
Holland was born in Poplar, East London. A midfielder, he made his professional debut for West Ham United in 1969. He became an integral player for the club playing in the team that won the 1975 FA Cup Final. He also played in the European Cup Winners Cup final of 1976, where he scored one of West Ham's goals in a 4–2 loss to Anderlecht.

Holland sustained a knee injury in a game against Notts County on 17 January 1981. Despite this, he earned a winner's medal as West Ham won the Second Division in 1981. As a result of his injury he played reserve team football but never again did so for the Hammers' first team. In all Holland made a total of 296 appearances for the East London club.

He then joined Leyton Orient as player-coach and later had spells at Queens Park Rangers as reserve team coach, and Orient as youth team coach. In 1988, he became reserve team coach at Tottenham Hotspur. In 1995, he left Spurs to be manager of Leyton Orient, who had just been relegated to Division Three. Despite being heavily backed by the new chairman, Holland presided over the club's low league standing in 1995–96, before being sacked in the wake of a poor start to the 1996–97 season. Subsequently, Holland went back to Spurs to take up the role of a coach within the club's academy.

Holland once again moved on from Tottenham in May 2006 to Millwall, joining as chief scout. He soon afterward took up the post of the assistant manager to Willie Donachie. Donachie was sacked by Millwall on 8 October 2007 after a start to the 2007–08 season that saw Millwall at the bottom of the League One table. Following the appointment of new Millwall manager, Kenny Jackett Holland left the club.

In July 2009, Holland left his role as scout for MK Dons following the departure of manager Roberto Di Matteo to West Bromwich Albion, and subsequent appointment of Paul Ince.

On 22 August 2012, Holland was appointed as the coach of Arsenal's under-18 team. However, he left his post at the club seven weeks later, citing personal reasons. With this being so, Holland went on working with Arsenal as a scout.

== Honours ==
West Ham United

- FA Cup: 1974–75
- Football League Second Division: 1980–81
