= Billy Jennings =

English footballer (born 1952)

Personal information
- Full name: William John Jennings
- Date of birth: 20 February 1952 (age 74)
- Place of birth: Hackney, London, England
- Position: Striker

Senior career*
Years	Team	Apps	(Gls)
1970–1974	Watford	93	(33)
1974–1979	West Ham United	99	(34)
1977	→ Chicago Sting (loan)	19	(6)
1979–1982	Orient	67	(21)
1982	Luton Town	2	(1)
- Dagenham
- Bishop's Stortford
- Heybridge Swifts
Total		280	(95)

International career
- England Youth
- * Club domestic league appearances and goals

Billy Jennings (born 20 February 1952) is an English former footballer who played as a striker in the Football League for Watford, West Ham United, Orient and Luton Town. He also played in the North American Soccer League for Chicago Sting.

A former youth player with Watford, Jennings made his professional debut for the Hornets on 10 April 1970, a third place play-off game against Manchester United in the 1969–70 FA Cup campaign at Highbury which the team lost 2–0. He made 10 League appearances that season, 16 in 1971–72, and 19 in 1972–73.

The 1973–74 season ended with Jennings as Third Division top scorer on 26 goals, and Watford Player of the Season. After 100 appearances for Watford, and England Youth international honours, Jennings signed for West Ham United for £110,000 in September 1974, an early signing for new manager John Lyall. The fee was almost double Watford's previous record for a received transfer fee, and was £5,000 less than West Ham's record spend.

Jennings scored on his Hammers debut on 7 September 1974, against Sheffield United, and was a member of the FA Cup winning team of 1974–75. The following season, West Ham got to the Final of the European Cup Winners' Cup, with Jennings scoring two goals in the away leg of club's quarter-final. The second-leg home game against ADO Den Haag saw the Hammers score three, to bring the aggregate score to 5–5, and go through on away goals.

In 1977, Jennings spent three months on loan at NASL club Chicago Sting, playing with fellow Englishman Ronnie Moore and Scot Willie Morgan. On his return, he suffers an Achilles injury, after which he failed to hold on to a regular place in the West Ham team. After 127 league and cup appearances and 41 goals for West Ham, he moved to Orient in August 1979.

Jennings scored 26 goals in 78 appearances for Orient before moving to Luton Town. Although he retired after two substitute appearances for the Hatters, he later played for Isthmian League clubs Dagenham, Bishop's Stortford and Heybridge Swifts.

Jennings later worked as a football agent, running the Premier Management agency, whose clients included former West Ham players Hayden Mullins and Kevin Nolan. He left the company in 2005.

== Honours ==
West Ham United

- FA Cup: 1974–75
