= Frank Lampard Sr. =

English footballer (born 1948)

Frank Lampard
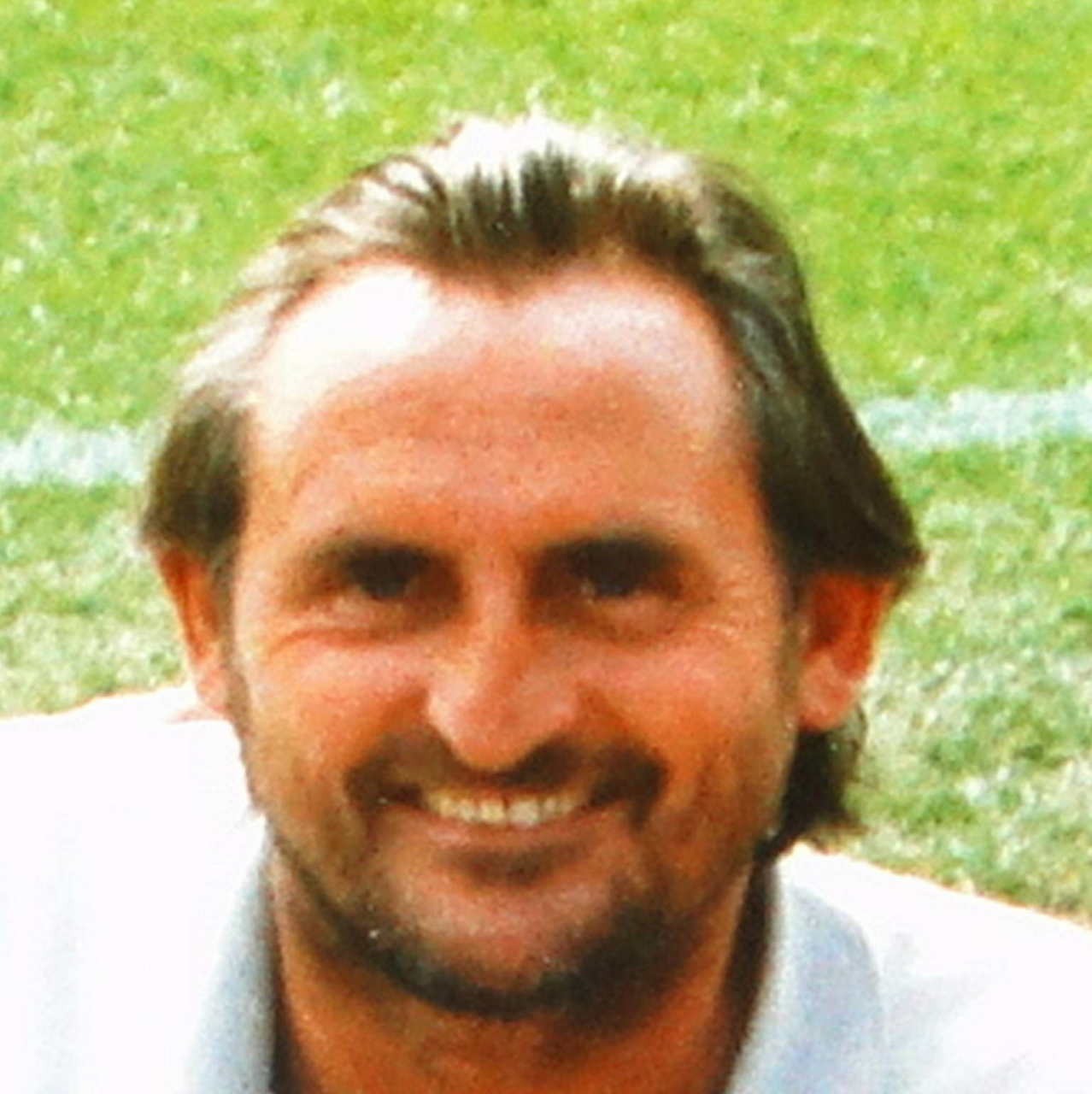
- Lampard in 1996

Personal information
- Full name: Frank Richard George Lampard
- Date of birth: 20 September 1948 (age 78)
- Place of birth: East Ham, England
- Position: Left-back

Youth career
- 1963–1967: West Ham United

Senior career*
Years	Team	Apps	(Gls)
1967–1985	West Ham United	551	(18)
1985–1986	Southend United	33	(1)
Total		584	(19)

International career
1971–1972	England U23	4	(0)
1972–1980	England	2	(0)

Managerial career
- 1994–2001: West Ham United (assistant)
- * Club domestic league appearances and goals

Frank Richard George Lampard (born 20 September 1948) is an English former professional football coach and player who played as a left-back.

He played most of his career for West Ham United, had a brief spell with Southend United, and was capped twice for England.

He is the father of former player and current Coventry City manager Frank Lampard.

== Early life ==
Lampard was born in East Ham, in 1948 to Frank Richard Lampard (1920–1953) and Hilda Drucilla (or Drusilla) Stiles (1928–2014). He has a sister, Gwendoline (born 1950), who is two years younger than him. He was only five years old when his father died in 1953, aged 33.

== Club career ==
Lampard started for the youth team of West Ham United in 1964. He debuted for West Ham United in November 1967 in a 3–2 home defeat by Manchester City, and quickly established himself in his preferred left-back position. Lampard was awarded a testimonial game by West Ham on 2 November 1976; a West Ham XI playing Fulham at the Boleyn Ground resulting in a 3–1 win for West Ham.

At club level, he won two FA Cups with West Ham, in 1975 and 1980, and the old second division title in 1981. By the time he left the club on a free transfer at the end of the 1984–85 season, Lampard had played 660 games, scored 22 goals and become one of the most celebrated players to pull on the claret and blue shirt. He wore the number 3.

He moved to Southend United for the 1985–86 season, then managed by another ex-West Ham star Bobby Moore and made 38 appearances for the Essex club before retiring.

== International career ==
At international level, Lampard won four England Under-23 caps and debuted for the England senior national team against Yugoslavia in October 1972.

== Managerial career ==
From 1994 to 2001, he returned to West Ham to serve as assistant manager under Harry Redknapp, his brother-in-law.

On 24 November 2008, Lampard was appointed as a football consultant to new Watford manager Brendan Rodgers. and then followed Rodgers to Reading in June 2009 to take up a similar role at the Madejski Stadium in June 2009. Lampard left Reading when Rodgers departed by mutual consent on 17 December 2009.

== Personal life ==
Lampard was married to Patricia Harris until her death on 24 April 2008 following complications from pneumonia. They had three children named Natalie, Claire and Frank Jr, who was also a professional footballer and manager.Patricia's twin sister is Sandra Redknapp, wife of English football manager Harry Redknapp. He is therefore also the uncle to former England and Premier League player Jamie Redknapp. In 2019, Lampard became the landlord of The Nightingale public house in Wanstead, London.

== Honours ==
West Ham United

- Football League Second Division: 1980–81
- FA Cup: 1974–75, 1979–80
- Football League Cup runner-up: 1980–81
