= Mervyn Day =

English footballer (born 1955)

Personal information
- Full name: Mervyn Richard Day
- Date of birth: 26 June 1955 (age 71)
- Place of birth: Chelmsford, England
- Height: 6 ft 2 in (1.88 m)
- Position: Goalkeeper

Youth career
- 1971–1973: West Ham United

Senior career*
Years	Team	Apps	(Gls)
1973–1979	West Ham United	194	(0)
1979–1983	Orient	170	(0)
1983–1985	Aston Villa	30	(0)
1985–1993	Leeds United	227	(0)
1992	→ Luton Town (loan)	4	(0)
1992	→ Sheffield United (loan)	1	(0)
1993–1994	Carlisle United	16	(0)
Total		640	(0)

International career
1971	England Youth	1	(0)
1974–1975	England U23	5	(0)

Managerial career
- 1996–1997: Carlisle United
- * Club domestic league appearances and goals

Mervyn Richard Day (born 26 June 1955) is an English former professional footballer who played in the Football League as a goalkeeper for West Ham United, Orient, Aston Villa, Leeds United, Luton Town, Sheffield United and Carlisle United. He later managed Carlisle United. He was formerly chief scout at Leeds United.

== Early life ==
Day was educated at Kings Road Primary School, attended also by another famous West Ham player, Geoff Hurst, and King Edward VI Grammar School, Chelmsford where he attained six 'O' levels.

== Playing career ==
Day represented Essex Schools at all levels and was picked for the England Schools squad six times, though he did not play. At aged 15 Ipswich Town, Tottenham Hotspur and West Ham United sent scouts to watch Day. Ron Greenwood's West Ham United signed Day on a youth contract in July 1971.

In February 1973, he signed a professional contract with West Ham and on 29 August 1973, he made his debut in a draw against Ipswich Town. Day became the first team goalkeeper soon after. In 1975, aged 19, he became the second-youngest goalkeeper to appear in an FA Cup Final at Wembley, in their victory over Fulham. He received the PFA Young Player of the Year Award that same season, the only goalkeeper to have won the award. In a competitive era of English goalkeeping, he was talked of as a possible future England goalkeeper. In 1976, he appeared in the Cup Winners' Cup Final which West Ham lost 4–2 to Anderlecht at a sold out Heysel Stadium. However, a loss of form and injuries saw him drop out of the side.

In July 1979, he moved to Orient for £100,000, where he replaced John Jackson.

When Eddie Gray, then manager of Leeds United, signed him in 1985, he proved to be an excellent buy and was a key figure in Billy Bremner's side in the 1987 run to the FA Cup semi-final and League play-offs. He remained first choice keeper for Howard Wilkinson, and picked up a Division 2 winners medal as promotion was finally achieved in 1990. With the re-signing of John Lukic, Day was relegated to the reserves and bench, and only made five more appearances for the first team, although he remained loyal to the club for three more seasons until he finally left Elland Road in 1993 after eight years. His final club was Carlisle United.

== Managerial and coaching career ==
After retiring, Day was manager of Carlisle United and led them to promotion into Division Two and a Football League Trophy win in 1997, but left shortly after due to a falling out with the chairman, Michael Knighton, who replaced Day as manager.

He was first team coach to Alan Curbishley at Charlton Athletic for many years before he and Curbishley both left the club at the end of the 2005–06 season. On 13 December 2006, he was again named as Curbishley's number two after the former was unveiled as the new West Ham manager but left the club at the same time as Curbishley in September 2008. On 20 July 2010, he rejoined Leeds United as chief scout to work alongside technical director Gwyn Williams. He left the position as chief scout at Leeds in March 2012 and worked as a co-commentator on ESPN's coverage of the Bundesliga. In November 2012, Day was appointed Scouting and Talent Identification Manager at Brighton and Hove Albion. On 2 July 2014, was appointed head of recruitment at West Bromwich Albion. On 30 June 2015, Day left his post as head of recruitment at West Bromwich Albion after a year in the job.

== Honours ==
=== As a player ===
West Ham United

- FA Cup: 1974–75

Leeds United

- Football League Second Division: 1989–90

=== As a manager ===
Carlisle United

- Football League Trophy: 1996–97
