= John McDowell (footballer) =

English footballer (born 1951)

Personal information
- Full name: John Alfred McDowell
- Date of birth: 7 September 1951 (age 75)
- Place of birth: East Ham, London, England
- Position: Defender

Youth career
- West Ham United

Senior career*
Years	Team	Apps	(Gls)
1969–1979	West Ham United	249	(8)
1979–1982	Norwich City	41	(1)
Total		290	(9)

International career
1970	England Youth	1	(0)
1972–1974	England U23	13	(0)
- * Club domestic league appearances and goals

John Alfred McDowell (born 7 September 1951) is an English former footballer who played in the Football League for West Ham United and Norwich City.

McDowell played for West Ham United as a youth. He made a single appearance for the England Youth team and went on to make 13 international appearances at under-23 level between 1972 and 1974.

He was a first-team regular for West Ham for ten years, missing only the 1976–77 season due to injury. He played as a defender, replacing Billy Bonds as right-back after the latter had switched to midfield. He made his league debut in October 1970 against Blackpool.

McDowell joined Norwich City in August 1979 for around £90,000, making his debut in a 4–2 win at Everton on 18 August 1979. He made 45 appearances for the club, scoring one goal. He joined the staff at Norwich in August 1981, coaching the reserve team, but left in May 1982 to become assistant manager at Bristol Rovers.

== Honours ==
West Ham United

- FA Cup: 1974–75
