= 1974–75 FA Cup =

Tournament details
- Country: England; Wales

Final positions
- Champions: West Ham United (2nd title)
- Runners-up: Fulham

Tournament statistics
- Top goal scorer(s): Viv Busby; Alan Taylor (6 goals)

The 1974–75 FA Cup was the 94th season of the world's oldest football cup competition, the Football Association Challenge Cup, commonly known as the FA Cup. West Ham United won the competition, defeating Second Division side Fulham 2–0 in the final at Wembley, London.

Matches were scheduled to be played at the stadium of the team named first on the date specified for each round, which was always a Saturday. If scores were level after 90 minutes had been played, a replay would take place at the stadium of the second-named team later the same week. If the replayed match was drawn further replays would be held until a winner was determined. If scores were level after 90 minutes had been played in a replay, a 30-minute period of extra time would be played.

== Calendar ==
Round	Date
Preliminary round	Saturday, 31 August 1974
First qualifying round	Saturday, 14 September 1974
Second qualifying round	Saturday, 5 October 1974
Third qualifying round	Saturday, 19 October 1974
Fourth qualifying round	Saturday, 2 November 1974
First round proper	Saturday, 23 November 1974
Second round proper	Saturday, 14 December 1974
Third round proper	Saturday, 4 January 1975
Fourth round proper	Saturday, 25 January 1975
Fifth round proper	Saturday, 15 February 1975
Sixth round proper	Saturday, 8 March 1975
Semi-finals	Saturday, 5 April 1975
Final	Saturday, 3 May 1975

== Qualifying rounds ==
Most participating clubs that were not members of the Football League competed in the qualifying rounds to secure one of 28 places available in the first round.

The winners from the fourth qualifying round were Blyth Spartans, Gateshead United, Bishop Auckland, Altrincham, Oswestry Town, Wigan Athletic, Marine, Farsley Celtic, Nuneaton Borough, Matlock Town, Stafford Rangers, Boston United, AP Leamington, Kettering Town, Ashford Town (Kent), Romford, Hitchin Town, Wycombe Wanderers, Chelmsford City, Slough Town, Tooting & Mitcham United, Wimbledon, Maidstone United, Leatherhead, Southwick, Weymouth, Cheltenham Town and Bath City.

Appearing in the competition proper for the first time were Farsley Celtic, AP Leamington, Maidstone United, Leatherhead and Southwick. Of the others, Bishop Auckland, Ashford Town (Kent) and Bath City had last featured at this stage in 1966–67, Tooting & Mitcham United had last done so in 1963-64, Oswestry Town and Matlcok Town had last done so in 1959–60, and Marine in 1947–48.

Gateshead United had relocated from South Shields during the summer of 1974 following the dissolution of Gateshead AFC. Although the club had qualified for the main draw of the Cup in each of the previous six seasons under its former name, this season marked the first time a club from Gateshead would be featuring in the first round since 1965–66.

== Results ==
=== First round proper ===
At this stage the 48 clubs from the Football League Third and Fourth Division joined the non-league clubs who came through the qualifying rounds. To complete this round, non-league sides Morecambe, Dartford, Bishop's Stortford and Ilford were given byes as the finalists from the previous season's FA Trophy and FA Amateur Cup respectively. During the 1974 close season the Football Association decided to abolish the distinction between amateur and professional clubs, resulting in the permanent cessation of the FA Amateur Cup. The annual finalists from the replacement competition for lower-level clubs, known as the FA Vase, would not receive byes to the first round of the FA Cup in subsequent seasons.

Matches were scheduled to be played on Saturday, 23 November 1974. Twelve matches were drawn, of which one required a second replay.

Tie no	Home team	Score	Away team	Date	Attendance	Notes
1	Ashford Town (Kent)	1–3	Walsall	27 November 1974	2,700	
2	Chesterfield	3–1	Boston United	23 November 1974	6,314	
3	Darlington	1–0	Workington	23 November 1974		
4	Dartford	2–3	Plymouth Argyle	23 November 1974	4,384	
5	Hartlepool	1–0	Bradford City	23 November 1974	3,677	
6	AFC Bournemouth	5–0	Southwick	23 November 1974		
7	Bury	4–2	Southport	23 November 1974		
8	Farsley Celtic	0–2	Tranmere Rovers	23 November 1974		^{[F]}
9	Rochdale	0–0	Marine	23 November 1974		
Replay	Marine	1–2	Rochdale	27 November 1974	2,540	
10	Watford	0–1	Colchester United	23 November 1974		
11	Grimsby Town	1–0	Huddersfield Town	23 November 1974		
12	Crewe Alexandra	2–2	Gateshead United	23 November 1974		
Replay	Gateshead United	1–0	Crewe Alexandra	25 November 1974	6,000	
13	Swindon Town	4–0	Reading	23 November 1974	13,365	
14	Shrewsbury Town	1–1	Wigan Athletic	23 November 1974		
Replay	Wigan Athletic	2–1	Shrewsbury Town	25 November 1974	11,860	
15	Bishop Auckland	5–0	Morecambe	23 November 1974		
16	Stockport County	0–0	Stafford Rangers	23 November 1974		
Replay	Stafford Rangers	1–0	Stockport County	26 November 1974	5,630	
17	Wycombe Wanderers	3–1	Cheltenham Town	23 November 1974		
18	Barnsley	1–2	Halifax Town	23 November 1974		
19	Brighton & Hove Albion	3–1	Aldershot	23 November 1974		
20	Hitchin Town	0–0	Cambridge United	23 November 1974		
Replay	Cambridge United	3–0	Hitchin Town	26 November 1974	2,827	
21	Wimbledon	1–0	Bath City	23 November 1974		
22	Exeter City	1–2	Newport County	23 November 1974		
23	Scunthorpe United	1–1	Altrincham	23 November 1974		
Replay	Altrincham	3–1	Scunthorpe United	25 November 1974		
24	Blyth Spartans	1–1	Preston North End	23 November 1974	8,500	
Replay	Preston North End	5–1	Blyth Spartans	26 November 1974	10,101	
25	Mansfield Town	3–1	Wrexham	23 November 1974		
26	Port Vale	2–2	Lincoln City	23 November 1974		
Replay	Lincoln City	2–0	Port Vale	27 November 1974	6,824	
27	Matlock Town	1–4	Blackburn Rovers	23 November 1974		
28	Oswestry Town	1–3	Doncaster Rovers	23 November 1974		
29	Torquay United	0–1	Northampton Town	23 November 1974		
30	Hereford United	1–0	Gillingham	26 November 1974	7,362	
31	Bishop's Stortford	0–0	Leatherhead	23 November 1974		
Replay	Leatherhead	2–0	Bishop's Stortford	26 November 1974	1,775	
32	Rotherham United	1–0	Chester	23 November 1974		
33	Romford	0–2	Ilford	23 November 1974		
34	Tooting & Mitcham United	1–2	Crystal Palace	27 November 1974	10,000	
35	Peterborough United	0–0	Weymouth	23 November 1974	8,984	
Replay	Weymouth	3–3	Peterborough United	4 December 1974	4,009	
2nd replay	Peterborough United	3–0	Weymouth	9 December 1974	9,077	^{[G]}
36	Chelmsford City	0–1	Charlton Athletic	23 November 1974		
37	Nuneaton Borough	2–2	Maidstone United	23 November 1974		
Replay	Maidstone United	2–0	Nuneaton Borough	26 November 1974	4,101	
38	Slough Town	1–4	Brentford	23 November 1974		
39	Swansea City	1–1	Kettering Town	26 November 1974	3,175	
Replay	Kettering Town	3–1	Swansea City	2 December 1974	5,973	
40	AP Leamington	1–2	Southend United	23 November 1974	3,000	

=== Second round proper ===
The matches were scheduled for Saturday, 14 December 1974. Five matches were drawn, with replays taking place later the same week.

Tie no	Home team	Score	Away team	Date	Attendance	Notes
1	Chesterfield	1–0	Doncaster Rovers	14 December 1974	5,267	
2	Hartlepool	0–0	Lincoln City	14 December 1974	2,838	
Replay	Lincoln City	1–0	Hartlepool	17 December 1974	4,985	
3	Rochdale	1–1	Tranmere Rovers	14 December 1974		
Replay	Tranmere Rovers	1–0	Rochdale	16 December 1974	3,244	
4	Blackburn Rovers	1–0	Darlington	14 December 1974		
5	Grimsby Town	1–1	Bury	14 December 1974		
Replay	Bury	2–1	Grimsby Town	17 December 1974		
6	Stafford Rangers	2–1	Halifax Town	14 December 1974		
7	Swindon Town	3–1	Maidstone United	14 December 1974	10,016	
8	Bishop Auckland	0–2	Preston North End	14 December 1974		
9	Ilford	0–2	Southend United	14 December 1974	3,486	
10	Wycombe Wanderers	0–0	AFC Bournemouth	14 December 1974		
Replay	AFC Bournemouth	1–2	Wycombe Wanderers	18 December 1974	5,407	
11	Brighton & Hove Albion	1–0	Brentford	14 December 1974		
12	Plymouth Argyle	2–1	Crystal Palace	14 December 1974	17,473	
13	Wimbledon	2–0	Kettering Town	14 December 1974		
14	Altrincham	3–0	Gateshead United	14 December 1974		
15	Newport County	1–3	Walsall	14 December 1974		
16	Rotherham United	2–1	Northampton Town	14 December 1974		
17	Wigan Athletic	1–1	Mansfield Town	14 December 1974		
Replay	Mansfield Town	3–1	Wigan Athletic	16 December 1974	11,249	
18	Peterborough United	3–0	Charlton Athletic	14 December 1974	9,642	
19	Leatherhead	1–0	Colchester United	14 December 1974		
20	Cambridge United	2–0	Hereford United	14 December 1974		

=== Third round proper ===
The 44 First and Second Division clubs entered the competition at this stage. The matches were scheduled Saturday, 4 January 1975. Eleven matches were drawn, of which two required second replays. Stafford Rangers became the first non-league club to defeat three Football League opponents in one tournament since Peterborough United in 1959–60.

Tie no	Home team	Score	Away team	Date	Attendance	Notes
1	Burnley	0–1	Wimbledon	4 January 1975	19,683	
2	Bury	2–2	Millwall	4 January 1975		
Replay	Millwall	1–1	Bury	7 January 1975	10,274	
2nd replay	Bury	2–0	Millwall	13 January 1975	4,000	^{[D]}
3	Liverpool	2–0	Stoke City	4 January 1975	48,723	
4	Preston North End	0–1	Carlisle United	4 January 1975		
5	Southampton	1–2	West Ham United	4 January 1975	24,615	
6	Leicester City	3–1	Oxford United	4 January 1975		
7	Notts County	3–1	Portsmouth	3 January 1975	14,723	
8	Nottingham Forest	1–1	Tottenham Hotspur	4 January 1975	23,355	
Replay	Tottenham Hotspur	0–1	Nottingham Forest	8 January 1975	27,996	
9	Blackburn Rovers	1–2	Bristol Rovers	4 January 1975		
10	Bolton Wanderers	0–0	West Bromwich Albion	4 January 1975		
Replay	West Bromwich Albion	4–0	Bolton Wanderers	8 January 1975	21,210	
11	Wolverhampton Wanderers	1–2	Ipswich Town	4 January 1975	28,542	
12	Sunderland	2–0	Chesterfield	4 January 1975	34,268	
13	Stafford Rangers	0–0	Rotherham United	4 January 1975	8,000	
Replay	Rotherham United	0–2	Stafford Rangers	7 January 1975	11,262	
14	Luton Town	0–1	Birmingham City	4 January 1975	17,543	
15	Everton	1–1	Altrincham	4 January 1975	34,519	
Replay	Altrincham	0–2	Everton	7 January 1975	35,530	^{[E]}
16	Swindon Town	2–0	Lincoln City	4 January 1975	11,971	
17	Sheffield United	2–0	Bristol City	4 January 1975		
18	Wycombe Wanderers	0–0	Middlesbrough	4 January 1975	12,000	
Replay	Middlesbrough	1–0	Wycombe Wanderers	7 January 1975	30,128	
19	Manchester City	0–2	Newcastle United	4 January 1975	37,625	
20	Fulham	1–1	Hull City	4 January 1975	8,897	
Replay	Hull City	2–2	Fulham	7 January 1975	11,850	
2nd replay	Fulham	1–0	Hull City	13 January 1975	4,929	^{[B]}
21	Coventry City	2–0	Norwich City	4 January 1975		
22	Brighton & Hove Albion	0–1	Leatherhead	4 January 1975		
23	Manchester United	0–0	Walsall	4 January 1975	43,353	
Replay	Walsall	3–2	Manchester United	7 January 1975	18,105	
24	Plymouth Argyle	2–0	Blackpool	4 January 1975	23,143	
25	Oldham Athletic	0–3	Aston Villa	4 January 1975		
26	Chelsea	3–2	Sheffield Wednesday	4 January 1975	24,679	
27	Southend United	2–2	Queens Park Rangers	4 January 1975	18,100	
Replay	Queens Park Rangers	2–0	Southend United	7 January 1975	21,484	
28	Mansfield Town	1–0	Cambridge United	4 January 1975		
29	Arsenal	1–1	York City	4 January 1975		
Replay	York City	1–3	Arsenal	7 January 1975	15,362	
30	Leeds United	4–1	Cardiff City	4 January 1975	31,572	
31	Peterborough United	1–0	Tranmere Rovers	4 January 1975	9,942	
32	Orient	2–2	Derby County	4 January 1975	12,490	
Replay	Derby County	2–1	Orient	8 January 1975	26,501	

=== Fourth round proper ===
The matches were scheduled for Saturday, 25 January 1975. Four matches were drawn, of which one, the tie between Fulham and Nottingham Forest, required three replays. Holders Liverpool were eliminated by Ipswich Town. Wimbledon, Stafford Rangers and Leatherhead were the last non-league clubs left in the competition.

Tie no	Home team	Score	Away team	Date	Attendance	Notes
1	Bury	1–2	Mansfield Town	25 January 1975		
2	Walsall	1–0	Newcastle United	25 January 1975	19,998	
3	Leatherhead	2–3	Leicester City	25 January 1975	32,000	^{[B]}
4	Aston Villa	4–1	Sheffield United	25 January 1975		
5	Middlesbrough	3–1	Sunderland	25 January 1975	39,400	
6	Derby County	2–0	Bristol Rovers	27 January 1975	27,980	
7	Stafford Rangers	1–2	Peterborough United	25 January 1975	31,160	^{[A]}
8	Ipswich Town	1–0	Liverpool	25 January 1975	34,709	
9	Queens Park Rangers	3–0	Notts County	24 January 1975	23,428	
10	Fulham	0–0	Nottingham Forest	28 January 1975	14,846	
Replay	Nottingham Forest	1–1	Fulham	3 February 1975	25,361	
2nd replay	Fulham	1–1	Nottingham Forest	5 February 1975	11,920	
3rd replay	Nottingham Forest	1–2	Fulham	10 February 1975	23,240	
11	Coventry City	1–1	Arsenal	25 January 1975		
Replay	Arsenal	3–0	Coventry City	29 January 1975	30,867	
12	West Ham United	1–1	Swindon Town	25 January 1975	35,679	
Replay	Swindon Town	1–2	West Ham United	28 January 1975	27,749	
13	Plymouth Argyle	1–3	Everton	25 January 1975	38,000	
14	Carlisle United	3–2	West Bromwich Albion	25 January 1975		
15	Chelsea	0–1	Birmingham City	25 January 1975	36,650	
16	Leeds United	0–0	Wimbledon	25 January 1975	46,230	
Replay	Wimbledon	0–1	Leeds United	10 February 1975	45,071	^{[C]}

=== Fifth round proper ===
The matches were scheduled for Saturday, 15 February 1975. Two matches were drawn, of which one required a second replay.

Tie no	Home team	Score	Away team	Date	Attendance	Notes
1	Derby County	0–1	Leeds United	18 February 1975	35,298	
2	Everton	1–2	Fulham	15 February 1975	45,233	
3	Ipswich Town	3–2	Aston Villa	15 February 1975	31,297	
4	West Ham United	2–1	Queens Park Rangers	15 February 1975	39,193	
5	Mansfield Town	0–1	Carlisle United	15 February 1975		
6	Arsenal	0–0	Leicester City	15 February 1975		
Replay	Leicester City	1–1	Arsenal	19 February 1975	35,000	
2nd replay	Leicester City	0–1	Arsenal	24 February 1975	39,025	
7	Peterborough United	1–1	Middlesbrough	15 February 1975	25,750	
Replay	Middlesbrough	2–0	Peterborough United	18 February 1975	34,303	
8	Birmingham City	2–1	Walsall	15 February 1975	45,881	

=== Sixth round proper ===
8 March 1975

Ipswich Town	0–0	Leeds United

Portman Road, Ipswich
Attendance: 38,010
Referee: E. Wallace
8 March 1975

Carlisle United	0–1	Fulham
		Barrett

Brunton Park, Carlisle
Attendance: 21,570
Referee: Gordon Hill
8 March 1975

Arsenal	0–2	West Ham United
		Taylor

Highbury, London
Attendance: 56,742
Referee: K. H. Burns
8 March 1975

Birmingham City	1–0	Middlesbrough
Hatton

St Andrew's, Birmingham
Attendance: 47,260
Referee: G. C. Kew

Replay

11 March 1975
19:30 GMT

Leeds United	1–1	Ipswich Town
McKenzie 90'		Johnson 17'

Elland Road, Leeds
Attendance: 50,074
Referee: E. Wallace

Second replay

25 March 1975

Ipswich Town	0–0	Leeds United

Filbert Street, Leicester
Attendance: 35,195
Referee: Jack Taylor

Third replay

27 March 1975

Leeds United	2–3	Ipswich Town
Clarke; Giles		Hamilton; Whymark; Woods

Filbert Street, Leicester
Attendance: 19,570
Referee: Jack Taylor

=== Semi-finals ===
5 April 1975
15:00

Fulham	1–1	Birmingham City
Mitchell 50'		Gallagher

Hillsborough, Sheffield
Attendance: 54,166
Referee: Bob Matthewson
5 April 1975
15:00

West Ham United	0–0	Ipswich Town

Villa Park, Birmingham
Attendance: 58,000
Referee: Clive Thomas

Replays

9 April 1975
19:30

Birmingham City	0–1 a.e.t	Fulham
		Mitchell 120'

Maine Road, Manchester
Attendance: 35,205
Referee: W. Gow
9 April 1975
19:30

Ipswich Town	1–2	West Ham United
Jennings 1' (o.g.)		A. Taylor

Stamford Bridge, London
Attendance: 45,344
Referee: Clive Thomas

=== Final ===
The final took place on Saturday, 3 May 1975 at Wembley and ended in a victory for West Ham United over Fulham by 2–0. Both goals were scored by Alan Taylor. The attendance was 100,000.

3 May 1975
15:00 BST

West Ham United	2–0	Fulham
A. Taylor 60', 64'

Wembley, London
Attendance: 100,000
Referee: Pat Partridge

West Ham	Fulham

== TV coverage ==
The right to show FA Cup games were, as with Football League matches, shared between the BBC and ITV network. All games were shown in a highlights format, except the Final, which was shown live both on BBC1 and ITV. The BBC football highlights programme Match Of The Day would show up to three games and the various ITV regional network stations would cover up to one game and show highlights from other games covered elsewhere on the ITV network. No games from rounds 1 or 2 were shown. Highlights of replays would be shown on either the BBC or ITV.

Third round BBC Orient v Derby County, Liverpool v Stoke City, Southampton v West Ham United ITV Wycombe Wanderers v Middlesbrough (LWT), Manchester City v Newcastle United (Granada & Tyne-Tees), Wolverhampton Wanderers v Ipswich Town (ATV), Southend United v Queens Park Rangers (Anglia), Leeds United v Cardiff City (Yorkshire & HTV), Brighton & Hove Albion v Leatherhead (Southern), Derby County v Orient (Midweek replay All Regions).

Fourth round BBC Leatherhead v Leicester City, Plymouth Argyle v Everton, Middlesbrough v Sunderland, Arsenal v Coventry (Midweek replay), Wimbledon v Leeds United (Monday night replay) ITV Ipswich Town v Liverpool (Anglia & Granada), West Ham United v Swindon Town (LWT & HTV), Coventry City v Arsenal (ATV), Leeds United v Wimbledon (Yorkshire).

Fifth round BBC Peterborough United v Middlesbrough, Arsenal v Leicester City, Mansfield Town v Carlisle United ITV West Ham United v Queens Park Rangers (LWT), Everton v Fulham (Granada), Ipswich Town v Aston Villa (Anglia), Birmingham City v Walsall (ATV), Derby County v Leeds United (Midweek All regions), Leicester City v Arsenal (Midweek 2nd replay All regions).

Sixth round BBC Arsenal v West Ham United, Birmingham City v Middlesbrough ITV Carlisle United v Fulham (Granada, LWT & Tyne-Tees), Ipswich Town v Leeds United (Anglia & Yorkshire), Leeds United v Ipswich Town (Midweek 2nd replay All regions)

Semi-Finals BBC Ipswich Town v West Ham United ITV Birmingham City v Fulham (All regions). (Neither BBC or ITV covered the replays. The goals were only shown as clips for TV news reports.)

Final Fulham v West Ham United shown live on both BBC and ITV.

== Notes ==
A.: Match played at Victoria Ground, Stoke-on-Trent.
B. ^{a} ^{b} : Match played at Filbert Street, Leicester.
C.: Match played at Selhurst Park, London.
D.: Match played at The Hawthorns, West Bromwich.
E.: Match played at Old Trafford, Manchester.
F.: Match played at Elland Road, Leeds.
G.: Match played at London Road, Peterborough.
