= 1973–74 West Ham United F.C. season =

English football team season

West Ham United
1973–74 season
- Chairman: Reg Pratt
- Manager: Ron Greenwood
- Stadium: Boleyn Ground
- First Division: 18th
- FA Cup: Third round
- League Cup: Second round
- Top goalscorer: League: Billy Bonds (13); All: Clyde Best, Bonds (13)
- Highest home attendance: 38,416 (vs Leeds United, 30 March 1974)
- Lowest home attendance: 16,513 (vs Stoke City, 22 December 1973)
- Average home league attendance: 28,388

In the 1973–74 season, West Ham United played in the First Division for the sixteenth consecutive season.

== Season summary ==
They made a poor start to the season, failing to win any of their first eleven League matches, and finishing at the bottom of the table by Christmas after losing at home to Stoke City. However, they rallied in the second half of the season, and a draw against Liverpool in their last fixture left them in 18th place, just one point ahead of relegated Southampton.

West Ham was knocked out of the FA Cup in a third-round replay by Third Division Hereford United. Hereford's team included Dudley Tyler, who had re-signed for them after leaving West Ham earlier in the season. The match had been tense; West Ham was only two minutes away from defeat at home before a solo goal by Pat Holland took the tie to a replay at Edgar Street, where Hereford came from behind to win 2–1.

West Ham's captain Bobby Moore, who was dropped the previous autumn, played his last match for the first team in the first FA Cup match against Hereford before moving to Fulham. The 1973–74 season was also Ron Greenwood's last full season as West Ham's manager.

== League table ==
Pos	Team	Pld	W	D	L	GF	GA	GAv	Pts	Qualification or relegation
16	Coventry City	42	14	10	18	43	54	0.796	38	
17	Chelsea	42	12	13	17	56	60	0.933	37	
18	West Ham United	42	11	15	16	55	60	0.917	37	
19	Birmingham City	42	12	13	17	52	64	0.813	37	
20	Southampton (R)	42	11	14	17	47	68	0.691	36	Relegation to the Second Division

Source: World Football
Rules for classification: 1) Points; 2) Goal average; 3) Goals scored
(R) Relegated

== Results ==
=== Football League First Division ===
Date	Opponent	Venue	Result	Attendance	Goalscorers
25 August 1973	Newcastle United	H	1–2	28,169	Robson
27 August 1973	Ipswich Town	H	3–3	23,335	Bonds, Brooking, Best
1 September 1973	Norwich City	A	2–2	25,706	Best, Robson
4 September 1973	Queens Park Rangers	A	0–0	28,360	
8 September 1973	Tottenham Hotspur	H	0–1	30,888	
10 September 1973	Queens Park Rangers	H	2–3	26,042	Robson, Bonds (pen)
15 September 1973	Manchester United	A	1–3	44,757	Bonds (pen)
22 September 1973	Leicester City	H	1–1	23,567	Robson
29 September 1973	Stoke City	A	0–2	16,395	
6 October 1973	Burnley	H	0–1	23,604	
13 October 1973	Everton	A	0–1	34,708	
20 October 1973	Coventry City	A	1–0	21,097	McDowell
27 October 1973	Derby County	H	0–0	31,237	
3 November 1973	Leeds United	A	1–4	36,869	MacDougall
10 November 1973	Sheffield United	H	2–2	21,243	Bonds, Brooking
17 November 1973	Wolverhampton Wanderers	A	0–0	19,587	
24 November 1973	Arsenal	H	1–3	28,287	Bonds
1 December 1973	Liverpool	A	0–1	34,857	
8 December 1973	Manchester City	H	2–1	20,790	Brooking, Doyle (o.g.)
15 December 1973	Birmingham City	A	1–3	23,787	Gould
22 December 1973	Stoke City	H	0–2	16,513	
26 December 1973	Chelsea	A	4–2	26,982	Lampard, Gould, Best (2)
29 December 1973	Tottenham Hotspur	A	0–2	33,172	
1 January 1974	Norwich City	H	4–2	32,259	Gould, Paddon (2), Brooking
12 January 1974	Manchester United	H	2–1	34,147	Bonds, Holland
19 January 1974	Newcastle United	A	1–1	27,216	Holland
2 February 1974	Birmingham City	H	0–0	27,948	
5 February 1974	Ipswich Town	A	3–1	25,747	Mills (o.g.), McDowell, Best
9 February 1974	Leicester City	A	1–0	27,032	Best
16 February 1974	Everton	H	4–3	29,347	Paddon, Best (2), Bonds
23 February 1974	Burnley	A	1–1	18,216	Paddon
2 March 1974	Chelsea	H	3–0	34,043	Bonds (3)
9 March 1974	Derby County	A	1–1	24,684	Bonds
16 March 1974	Coventry City	H	2–3	26,502	Bonds (2; 1 pen)
23 March 1974	Sheffield United	A	0–1	19,467	
30 March 1974	Leeds United	H	3–1	38,416	Best, Robson, Brooking
6 April 1974	Arsenal	A	0–0	37,868	
12 April 1974	Southampton	H	4–1	24,163	Robson (2), Best (2)
13 April 1974	Wolverhampton Wanderers	H	0–0	29,488	
15 April 1974	Southampton	A	1–1	26,515	Best
20 April 1974	Manchester City	A	1–2	29,700	Gould
27 April 1974	Liverpool	H	2–2	36,160	Lampard, Brooking

=== FA Cup ===
Round	Date	Opponent	Venue	Result	Attendance	Goalscorers
R3	5 January 1974	Hereford United	H	1–1	23,087	Holland
R3 replay	8 January 1974	Hereford United	A	1–2	17,423	Best

=== League Cup ===
Round	Date	Opponent	Venue	Result	Attendance	Goalscorers
R2	8 October 1973	Liverpool	H	2–2	25,840	MacDougall, Robson
R2 replay	29 October 1973	Liverpool	A	0–1	26,002	

== Players ==
Nation	Player	Pos	Lge Apps	Lge Gls	FAC Apps	FAC Gls	LC Apps	LC Gls	Date signed	Previous club
(England)	Mervyn Day	GK	33		2		2		1973	Academy
(Scotland)	Bobby Ferguson	GK	9						1967	Kilmarnock
(England)	Clive Charles	DF	1						1970	Academy
(England)	Keith Coleman	DF	31 (2)		1		2		1973	Sunderland
(England)	Frank Lampard	DF	42	2	2		2		1967	Academy
(England)	Kevin Lock	DF	9 (2)				2		1971	Academy
(England)	John McDowell	DF	33	2	1		2		1969	Academy
(England)	Mick McGiven	DF	21		2				1974	Sunderland
(England)	Bobby Moore	DF	22		1		1		1958	Academy
(England)	Tommy Taylor	DF	40		2		2		1970	Orient
(England)	Billy Bonds	MF	40	13	2		1		1967	Charlton Athletic
(England)	Trevor Brooking	MF	38	6			2		1967	Academy
(England)	Pat Holland	MF	20 (3)	2	1 (1)	1	0 (2)		1969	Academy
(Northern Ireland)	Bertie Lutton	MF	4 (2)		1				1973	Brighton & Hove Albion
(England)	Graham Paddon	MF	24	4	2				1973	Norwich City
(England)	Dudley Tyler	MF	8				1		1972	Hereford United
(England)	Alan Wooler	MF	1 (1)		1				1973	Reading
(England)	Johnny Ayris	FW	5				1		1970	Academy
(Bermuda)	Clyde Best	FW	34	12	2	1	2		1969	Academy
(United States)	Ade Coker	FW	0 (1)		1				1971	Academy
(England)	Bobby Gould	FW	11 (1)	4	1				1973	Bristol City
(Scotland)	Ted MacDougall	FW	14	1			1	1	1973	Manchester United
(England)	Pop Robson	FW	22	7			1	1	1971	Newcastle United
