= 1976–77 West Ham United F.C. season =

English football team season

West Ham United
1976–77 season
- Chairman: Reg Pratt
- Manager: John Lyall & Ron Greenwood
- Stadium: Boleyn Ground
- First Division: 17th
- FA Cup: Fourth round
- League Cup: Fourth round
- Top goalscorer: League: Pop Robson (14); All: Pop Robson (14)
- Highest home attendance: 32,079 (vs Derby County, 7 May 1977)
- Lowest home attendance: 17,889 (vs Barnsley, 1 September 1976)
- Average home league attendance: 26,015

West Ham United narrowly escaped relegation by finishing 17th in the First Division in the 1976–77 season.

== Season summary ==
Although West Ham ended their run of seven months without a League victory in August 1976 by beating Queens Park Rangers, they dropped to the bottom of the table after failing to win any of their other first twelve League games. At the start of April 1977, they still occupied last place, but after a succession of draws they beat Manchester United 4–2 at Upton Park in their last fixture to avoid relegation by two points, having lost just one of their last thirteen matches. Perversely, many of their better performances came against teams towards the top of the table: as well as doing a League double over Manchester United, they took three points off the champions Liverpool and also beat Arsenal at Highbury and Manchester City at home. Pop Robson, who had re-signed for the club from Sunderland, was their top scorer with 14 goals.

West Ham also struggled in the cups, and they were convincingly beaten by Aston Villa in the fourth round of the FA Cup.

== League table ==
Pos	Team	Pld	W	D	L	GF	GA	GD	Pts
15	Derby County	42	9	19	14	50	55	−5	37
16	Norwich City	42	14	9	19	47	64	−17	37
17	West Ham United	42	11	14	17	46	65	−19	36
18	Bristol City	42	11	13	18	38	48	−10	35
19	Coventry City	42	10	15	17	48	59	−11	35

Source: World Football
Rules for classification: 1) Points; 2) Goal difference; 3) Goals scored

== Results ==
=== Football League First Division ===
Date	Opponent	Venue	Result	Attendance	Goalscorers
21 August 1976	Aston Villa	A	0–4	39,012	
23 August 1976	Queens Park Rangers	H	1–0	31,668	Paddon
28 August 1976	Leicester City	H	0–0	24,960	
4 September 1976	Stoke City	H	1–2	19,131	A Taylor
11 September 1976	Arsenal	H	0–2	31,965	
18 September 1976	Bristol City	A	1–1	28,932	A Taylor
25 September 1976	Sunderland	H	1–1	24,319	Jennings
2 October 1976	Manchester City	A	2–4	37,795	A Taylor, Doyle (o.g.)
6 October 1976	Leeds United	H	1–3	21,909	Jennings
16 October 1976	Ipswich Town	H	0–2	24,534	
23 October 1976	Everton	A	2–3	23,163	McNaught (o.g.), Bonds
30 October 1976	West Bromwich Albion	A	0–3	19,856	
6 November 1976	Tottenham Hotspur	H	5–3	28,997	P Robson, Bonds, Jennings, Brooking, Curbishley
10 November 1976	Norwich City	A	0–1	24,762	
20 November 1976	Newcastle United	A	1–2	21,324	P Robson
27 November 1976	Manchester United	A	2–0	55,366	Brooking, Jennings
4 December 1976	Middlesbrough	H	0–1	20,184	
18 December 1976	Liverpool	H	2–0	24,175	Brooking, Jennings
27 December 1976	Birmingham City	A	0–0	39,978	
1 January 1977	Tottenham Hotspur	A	1–2	44,972	Brooking
3 January 1977	West Bromwich Albion	H	0–0	25,236	
22 January 1977	Aston Villa	H	0–1	27,577	
5 February 1977	Leicester City	A	0–2	16,201	
12 February 1977	Stoke City	H	1–0	20,160	P Robson
19 February 1977	Arsenal	A	3–2	38,221	A Taylor (2), Jennings
26 February 1977	Bristol City	H	2–0	29,713	Bonds (pen), Jennings
5 March 1977	Sunderland	A	0–6	35,357	
12 March 1977	Manchester City	H	1–0	24,974	P Robson
22 March 1977	Ipswich Town	A	1–4	27,315	P Robson (pen)
2 April 1977	Everton	H	2–2	22,518	P Robson (2)
4 April 1977	Queens Park Rangers	A	1–1	24,930	P Robson
8 April 1977	Birmingham City	H	2–2	28,167	Jennings, Pike
9 April 1977	Coventry City	A	1–1	15,816	P Robson
11 April 1977	Norwich City	H	1–0	27,084	Pike
16 April 1977	Newcastle United	A	0–3	30,967	
20 April 1977	Derby County	A	1–1	21,380	Pike (pen)
26 April 1977	Leeds United	A	1–1	16,891	P Robson
29 April 1977	Middlesbrough	A	1–1	16,500	P Robson
4 May 1977	Coventry City	H	2–0	25,461	P Robson, Pike (pen)
7 May 1977	Derby County	H	2–2	32,079	Pike, Jennings
14 May 1977	Liverpool	A	0–0	55,675	
16 May 1977	Manchester United	H	4–2	29,311	Lampard, Pike, P Robson (2)

=== FA Cup ===
Round	Date	Opponent	Venue	Result	Attendance	Goalscorers
R3	8 January 1977	Bolton Wanderers	H	2–1	24,147	Jennings, Pike
R4	29 January 1977	Aston Villa	A	0–3	46,954	

=== League Cup ===
Round	Date	Opponent	Venue	Result	Attendance	Goalscorers
R2	1 September 1976	Barnsley	H	3–0	17,889	Holland (2), Paddon
R3	21 September 1976	Charlton Athletic	A	1–0	32,898	A Taylor
R4	27 October 1976	Queens Park Rangers	H	0–2	24,565	

== Players ==
Nation	Player	Pos	Lge Apps	Lge Gls	FAC Apps	FAC Gls	LC Apps	LC Gls	Date signed	Previous club
First Team
(England)	Mervyn Day	GK	42		2		3		1973	Academy
(England)	Frank Lampard	LB	36	1	2		1		1967	Academy
(England)	Billy Bonds (Capt)	CM	41	3	2		3		1967	Charlton Athletic
(England)	Bill Green	CH	22		2		2		1976	Carlisle United
(England)	Tommy Taylor	D	36		2		3		1970	Leyton Orient
(England)	Kevin Lock	CH	25 (1)		2		2		1971	Academy
(England)	Alan Devonshire	LM	27 (1)	3			1		1976	Southall
(England)	Billy Jennings	F	27 (4)	9	2	1	2		1974	Watford
(England)	Trevor Brooking	CM	42	4	2		3		1967	Academy
(England)	Pop Robson	CF	30	14	2				1976	Sunderland
(England)	Alan Taylor	CF	24 (1)	5	1		2	1	1974	Rochdale
Other Players
(England)	Johnny Ayris	RW	1 (2)						1970	Academy
(England)	Keith Coleman	RB	12 (1)				2		1973	Sunderland
(England)	Alan Curbishley	M	8 (2)	1	1		1		1974	Academy
(England)	Pat Holland	M	6				1	2	1969	Academy
(England)	Mick McGiven	CH	15 (1)				2		1973	Sunderland
(Cyprus)	Yılmaz Orhan	F	1 (2)				1		1975	Aveley
(England)	Anton Otulakowski	M	10 (2)						1976	Barnsley
(England)	Graham Paddon	M	12	1			3	1	1973	Norwich City
(England)	Geoff Pike	M	20	6	1	1			1975	Academy
(England)	John Radford	M	18		1				1976	Arsenal
(England)	Keith Robson	W	7 (2)				1		1974	Newcastle United
