= 1974–75 West Ham United F.C. season =

English football team season

West Ham United
1974–75 season
- Chairman: Reg Pratt
- Manager: John Lyall & Ron Greenwood
- Stadium: Boleyn Ground
- First Division: 13th
- FA Cup: Winners
- League Cup: Third round
- Top goalscorer: League: Billy Jennings (13); All: Billy Jennings (14)
- Highest home attendance: 40,256 (vs Liverpool, 19 February 1975)
- Lowest home attendance: 15,854 (vs Tranmere Rovers, 18 September 1974)
- Average home league attendance: 30,077
Home colours

West Ham United won the FA Cup Final for the second time in the 1974–75 season.

== Season summary ==
West Ham United recorded a 2–0 victory in the final against a Fulham side including former Upton Park captain Bobby Moore. Both goals were scored by Alan 'Sparrow' Taylor. West Ham finished in 13th position in the First Division.

== League table ==
Pos	Team	Pld	W	D	L	GF	GA	GAv	Pts	Qualification or relegation
11	Queens Park Rangers	42	16	10	16	54	54	1.000	42	
12	Wolverhampton Wanderers	42	14	11	17	57	54	1.056	39	
13	West Ham United	42	13	13	16	58	59	0.983	39	Qualification for the European Cup Winners' Cup first round (Note: West Ham United qualified for the European Cup Winners' Cup as the 1974-75 FA Cup winners.)
14	Coventry City	42	12	15	15	51	62	0.823	39	
15	Newcastle United	42	15	9	18	59	72	0.819	39	

Source: World Football
Rules for classification: 1) Points; 2) Goal average; 3) Goals scored

== Results ==
=== Football League First Division ===
Date	Opponent	Venue	Result	Attendance	Goalscorers
17 August 1974	Manchester City	A	0–4	30,240	
19 August 1974	Luton Town	H	2–0	23,182	Lampard, Bonds
24 August 1974	Everton	H	2–3	22,486	Bonds (pen), McDowell
28 August 1974	Luton Town	A	0–0	16,931	
31 August 1974	Newcastle United	A	0–2	30,780	
7 September 1974	Sheffield United	H	1–2	20,977	Jennings
14 September 1974	Tottenham Hotspur	A	1–2	27,959	Lampard
21 September 1974	Leicester City	H	6–2	21,377	Jennings (2), Bonds, Gould (2), Robson
25 September 1974	Birmingham City	H	3–0	29,495	Paddon, Jennings, Robson
28 September 1974	Burnley	A	5–3	17,613	Robson (2), Brooking, Jennings, Bonds
5 October 1974	Derby County	H	2–2	32,900	Robson, Bonds
12 October 1974	Coventry City	A	1–1	22,519	Gould
15 October 1974	Everton	A	1–1	31,855	Gould
19 October 1974	Ipswich Town	H	1–0	33,543	Jennings
26 October 1974	Arsenal	A	0–3	41,004	
2 November 1974	Middlesbrough	H	3–0	28,915	Robson, Boam (o.g.), Paddon
9 November 1974	Carlisle United	A	1–0	14,141	Lampard
16 November 1974	Wolverhampton Wanderers	H	5–2	31,708	Bonds (pen), Brooking, Lampard, Jennings, Gould
23 November 1974	Liverpool	A	1–1	46,346	Robson
30 November 1974	Queens Park Rangers	A	2–0	28,356	Jennings, Paddon
7 December 1974	Leeds United	H	2–1	39,562	Gould, Jennings
14 December 1974	Manchester City	H	0–0	33,908	
21 December 1974	Chelsea	A	1–1	34,969	Gould
26 December 1974	Tottenham Hotspur	H	1–1	37,682	Robson
28 December 1974	Stoke City	A	1–2	33,498	Holland
11 January 1975	Leeds United	A	1–2	40,099	Robson
18 January 1975	Queens Park Rangers	H	2–2	28,772	Jennings, Bonds (pen)
1 February 1975	Carlisle United	H	2–0	26,805	Jennings, Holland
8 February 1975	Middlesbrough	A	0–0	29,179	
19 February 1975	Liverpool	H	0–0	40,256	
22 February 1975	Wolverhampton Wanderers	A	1–3	24,791	Gould
28 February 1975	Newcastle United	H	0–1	32,753	
15 March 1975	Burnley	H	2–1	28,830	Robson, Taylor
18 March 1975	Birmingham City	A	1–1	34,000	Taylor
22 March 1975	Sheffield United	A	2–3	25,527	Gould, Jennings
28 March 1975	Stoke City	H	2–2	29,811	Brooking, Jennings
29 March 1975	Chelsea	H	0–1	31,025	
1 April 1975	Leicester City	A	0–3	30,408	
12 April 1975	Derby County	A	0–1	31,336	
19 April 1975	Coventry City	H	1–2	27,431	Holland
26 April 1975	Ipswich Town	A	1–4	31,592	Holland
28 April 1975	Arsenal	H	1–0	30,195	Paddon

=== FA Cup ===
Round	Date	Opponent	Venue	Result	Attendance	Goalscorers
R3	4 January 1975	Southampton	A	2–1	24,615	Lampard, Gould
R4	25 January 1975	Swindon Town	H	1–1	35,679	Jennings 75'
R4 replay	28 January 1975	Swindon Town	A	2–1	27,749	Brooking, Holland
R5	15 February 1975	Queens Park Rangers	H	2–1	39,193	Holland, Robson
R6	8 March 1975	Arsenal	A	2–0	56,742	Taylor (2)
SF	5 April 1975	Ipswich Town	N	0–0	58,000	
SF replay	9 April 1975	Ipswich Town	N	2–1	45,344	Taylor (2)
F	3 May 1975	Fulham	N	2–0	100,000	Taylor 60', 64'

=== League Cup ===
Round	Date	Opponent	Venue	Result	Attendance	Goalscorers
R2	11 September 1974	Tranmere Rovers	A	0–0	8,638	
R2 replay	18 September 1974	Tranmere Rovers	H	6–0	15,854	Bonds (2; 1 pen), Gould (3), Ayris
R3	8 October 1974	Fulham	A	1–2	29,611	Brooking

== Players ==
Number		Player	Position	Lge Apps	Lge Gls	FAC Apps	FAC Gls	LC Apps	LC Gls	Date signed	Previous club
FA Cup Final Team
1	(England)	Mervyn Day	GK	42		8		3		1973	Academy
2	(England)	John McDowell	RB	33(1)	1	8		2		1970	Academy
3	(England)	Frank Lampard	LB	40	4	8	1	3		1967	Academy
4	(England)	Billy Bonds (Capt) (Hammer of the Year)	DCM	31	7	8		3	2	1967	Charlton Athletic
5	(England)	Tommy Taylor	CH	39		7		3		1970	Orient
6	(England)	Kevin Lock	CH	41(1)		8		3		1971	Academy
7	(England)	Billy Jennings	CF	32	13	8	1			1974	Watford
8	(England)	Graham Paddon	M	40	4	8		3		1973	Norwich City
9	(England)	Alan Taylor	CF	11(3)	2	4	6			1974	Rochdale
10	(England)	Trevor Brooking	CM	36	3	8	1	3	1	1967	Academy
11	(England)	Pat Holland	LW	18(4)	4	4(3)	2	1 (1)		1969	Academy
Important Players
9	(England)	Bobby Gould	F	31(3)	9	3	1	2	3	1973	Bristol City
2	(England)	Keith Coleman	RB	27(2)		1		1		1973	Sunderland
11	(England)	Keith Robson	LW	25	10	3	1	2		1974	Newcastle United
11	(Bermuda)	Clyde Best	F	12(3)		2		1		1969	Academy
Other Players
12	(England)	Johnny Ayris	F	2 (4)				3	1	1970	Academy
4	(England)	Alan Curbishley	M	1 (1)						1974	Academy
8	(England)	Alan Wooler	M	1						1973	Reading
