= 1972–73 West Ham United F.C. season =

English football team season

West Ham United
1972–73 season
- Chairman: Reg Pratt
- Manager: Ron Greenwood
- Stadium: Boleyn Ground
- First Division: 6th
- FA Cup: Fourth round
- League Cup: Third round
- Top goalscorer: League: Pop Robson (28); All: Robson (28)
- Highest home attendance: 38,804 (vs Leeds United, 14 April 1973)
- Lowest home attendance: 17,688 (vs Bristol City, 6 September 1972)
- Average home league attendance: 30,025
Home colours

In the 1972–73 season West Ham United finished sixth in the First Division, their highest League position under the management of Ron Greenwood and the joint-highest in their history at that time.

== Season summary ==
Pop Robson was the First Division's top scorer with 28 League goals, including eight doubles and a hat-trick, just one behind the post-war club record held by Geoff Hurst, who had left the Hammers for Stoke City the previous summer. In February 1973, Bobby Moore overtook Jimmy Ruffell's West Ham appearance record. He won his hundredth England cap in the same month.

West Ham continued their poor Cup record from previous seasons by losing in both the FA Cup and the League Cup to lower League opposition. Second Division Hull City beat them in the fourth round of the FA Cup, and the Hammers suffered a humiliating defeat at Fourth Division Stockport County in the League Cup.

== League table ==
Pos	Team	Pld	W	D	L	GF	GA	GAv	Pts	Qualification or relegation
4	Ipswich Town	42	17	14	11	55	45	1.222	48	Qualification for the UEFA Cup first round (Note: Tottenham Hotspur qualified for the UEFA Cup as the Football League Cup winners.)
5	Wolverhampton Wanderers	42	18	11	13	66	54	1.222	47	Qualification for the UEFA Cup first round
6	West Ham United	42	17	12	13	67	53	1.264	46	Qualification for the Watney Cup (Note: West Ham United and Stoke City qualified for the Watney Cup as the two teams with the most goals that had not already qualified for a European competition.)
7	Derby County	42	19	8	15	56	54	1.037	46	
8	Tottenham Hotspur	42	16	13	13	58	48	1.208	45	Qualification for the UEFA Cup first round

Source: World Football
Rules for classification: 1) Points; 2) Goal average; 3) Goals scored

== Results ==
=== Football League First Division ===
Date	Opponent	Venue	Result	Attendance	Goalscorers
12 August 1972	West Bromwich Albion	A	0–0	21,509	
14 August 1972	Coventry City	H	1–0	27,498	Best
19 August 1972	Leicester City	H	5–2	25,414	Moore, Coker, Robson (2), Tyler
22 August 1972	Wolverhampton Wanderers	A	0–3	21,958	
26 August 1972	Liverpool	A	2–3	50,491	Robson (2)
29 August 1972	Arsenal	A	0–1	43,802	
2 September 1972	Manchester United	H	2–2	31,939	Robson (2)
9 September 1972	Chelsea	A	3–1	34,392	Taylor, Moore, Bonds
16 September 1972	Norwich City	H	4–0	27,780	Brooking, Robson (2), Taylor
23 September 1972	Tottenham Hotspur	A	0–1	51,700	
30 September 1972	Birmingham City	H	2–0	26,482	Bonds, Best
7 October 1972	Ipswich Town	A	1–1	22,377	Best
14 October 1972	Sheffield United	H	3–1	25,379	Brooking, Robson (2)
21 October 1972	Manchester City	A	3–4	30,890	Best, Ayris, Moore
28 October 1972	Crystal Palace	H	4–0	28,894	Brooking (2), McDowell, Robson
4 November 1972	Wolverhampton Wanderers	H	2–2	29,524	Robson, Brooking
11 November 1972	Coventry City	A	1–3	27,189	McDowell
18 November 1972	Derby County	H	1–2	28,154	Robson
25 November 1972	Everton	A	2–1	27,558	Brooking, Best
2 December 1972	Newcastle United	H	1–1	23,785	Brooking
9 December 1972	Leeds United	A	0–1	30,270	
16 December 1972	Stoke City	H	3–2	23,269	Robson (2), Best
23 December 1972	Southampton	A	0–0	19,429	
26 December 1972	Tottenham Hotspur	H	2–2	37,397	Robson (2; 1 pen)
30 December 1972	Leicester City	A	1–2	19,341	Brooking
6 January 1973	Liverpool	H	0–1	34,480	
20 January 1973	Manchester United	A	2–2	50,878	Robson, Best
27 January 1973	Chelsea	H	3–1	33,336	Taylor, Robson (2)
10 February 1973	Norwich City	A	1–0	27,032	Robson
17 February 1973	West Bromwich Albion	H	2–1	26,071	Bonds, Robson
24 February 1973	Stoke City	A	0–2	21,855	
2 March 1973	Ipswich Town	H	0–1	37,004	
10 March 1973	Sheffield United	A	0–0	24,024	
17 March 1973	Manchester City	H	2–1	29,370	MacDougall, Robson
24 March 1973	Crystal Palace	A	3–1	36,915	Robson, Brooking, MacDougall
31 March 1973	Everton	H	2–0	25,531	Robson, Lock
7 April 1973	Newcastle United	A	2–1	24,030	MacDougall (2)
14 April 1973	Leeds United	H	1–1	38,804	Holland
20 April 1973	Southampton	H	4–3	33,039	Robson (3), Brooking
21 April 1973	Derby County	A	1–1	28,727	Lutton
23 April 1973	Birmingham City	A	0–0	36,942	
28 April 1973	Arsenal	H	1–2	37,368	Rice (o.g.)

=== FA Cup ===
Round	Date	Opponent	Venue	Result	Attendance	Goalscorers
R3	13 January 1973	Port Vale	A	1–0	20,619	Holland
R4	8 February 1973	Hull City	A	0–1	32,290	

=== League Cup ===
Round	Date	Opponent	Venue	Result	Attendance	Goalscorers
R2	6 September 1972	Bristol City	H	2–1	17,688	McDowell, Best
R3	4 October 1972	Stockport County	A	1–2	13,410	Best

== Players ==
Number		Player	Position	Lge Apps	Lge Gls	FAC Apps	FAC Gls	LC Apps	LC Gls	Date Signed	Previous club
First XI
1	(Scotland)	Bobby Ferguson	GK	31		2				1967	Kilmarnock
2	(England)	John McDowell	RB	38	2	2		2	1	1970	Academy
3	(England)	Frank Lampard	LB	38		2		2		1967	Academy
4	(England)	Billy Bonds	DCM	39	3	2		2		1967	Charlton Athletic
5	(England)	Tommy Taylor	CH	37	3	2		2		1970	Orient
6	(England)	Bobby Moore (Captain)	CH	42	3	2		2		1958	Academy
7	(England)	Dudley Tyler	RW	21	1	2		2		1972	Hereford
8	(Bermuda)	Clyde Best	CF	41(1)	7	2		2	2	1969	Academy
9	(England)	Pat Holland	LW	30(2)	1	2	1	2		1969	Academy
10	(England)	Trevor Brooking	ACM	40	11	2		2		1967	Academy
11	(England)	Pop Robson (Hammer of the Year)	CF	42	28	2		2		1970	Newcastle United
Other Players
5	(England)	Kevin Lock	D/M	14(4)	1	0 (1)				1971	Academy
7	(England)	Johnny Ayris	RW	13(2)	1					1970	Academy
1	(England)	Peter Grotier	GK	11				2		1968	Academy
9	(Scotland)	Ted MacDougall	CF	10	4					1972	Manchester United
3	(England)	Clive Charles	FB	7 (2)		0 (1)				1971	Academy
8	(Northern Ireland)	Bertie Lutton	F	4 (2)	1					1972	Brighton & Hove Albion
9	(Nigeria)	Ade Coker	CF	4	1					1971	Academy
12	(England)	Ronnie Boyce	F	0 (2)						1960	Academy
