= Ownership of West Ham United F.C. =

History of Owners of the UK football club West Ham United

West Ham United F.C. is a football club based in London. It was founded in 1900 by Arnold Hills, owner of Thames Ironworks and Shipbuilding Company. The club's forerunner, Thames Ironworks F.C. ceased to exist in 1900 with West Ham United being formed to take its place.

== Ownership ==
=== Family club ===
Since the founding of West Ham United in 1900 as a Limited company and then a Public limited company, until the sale to an Icelandic consortium in 2006, they were known as a "family owned" club. Martin Cearns, chairman from 1990 until 1992 and a board member until 2006, was the third member of the family to be chairman. His family had been associated with West Ham since its 1900 foundation. J.W.Y (Jimmy) Cearns worked for Thames Ironworks and Shipbuilding Company and was a founding member, and director (1900–1904, 1907–1934) of the club until 1934. His son, W.J. Cearns was chairman from 1935 until 1950. W.J. Cearns' son, L.C. (Len) Cearns, was a director from 1948, vice-chairman from 1950 and chairman from 1979 until 1990.

Len Cearns elder brother W.F. (Will) Cearns was a director from the death of their father in 1950. Will and Len's younger brother Brian R. Cearns was a director from 1962. Another member of the board which sold the club in 2006, Charles Warner, is the great grandson of club founder, Arnold Hills. The majority shareholder under the limited company with 1100 of the 4000 shares issued was Arnold Hills and on his death his descendants. Two unsuccessful attempts by the board were made to buy the shares in 1927 on Hills' death and in 1948 from his family. From 1924 until 1961, 1142 shares remained unsold giving the statutory five man board with only 403 shares between them the ability to consolidated their position dictating who would be sold shares and elected to the board as there was no interference from Hills or his descendants. In 1961 the board members each bought 200 of the unsold shares and 142 were sold to newly elected director R G Brandon at face value. Jack Petchey was a director at from June 1978 until 1989.

=== Terry Brown ===
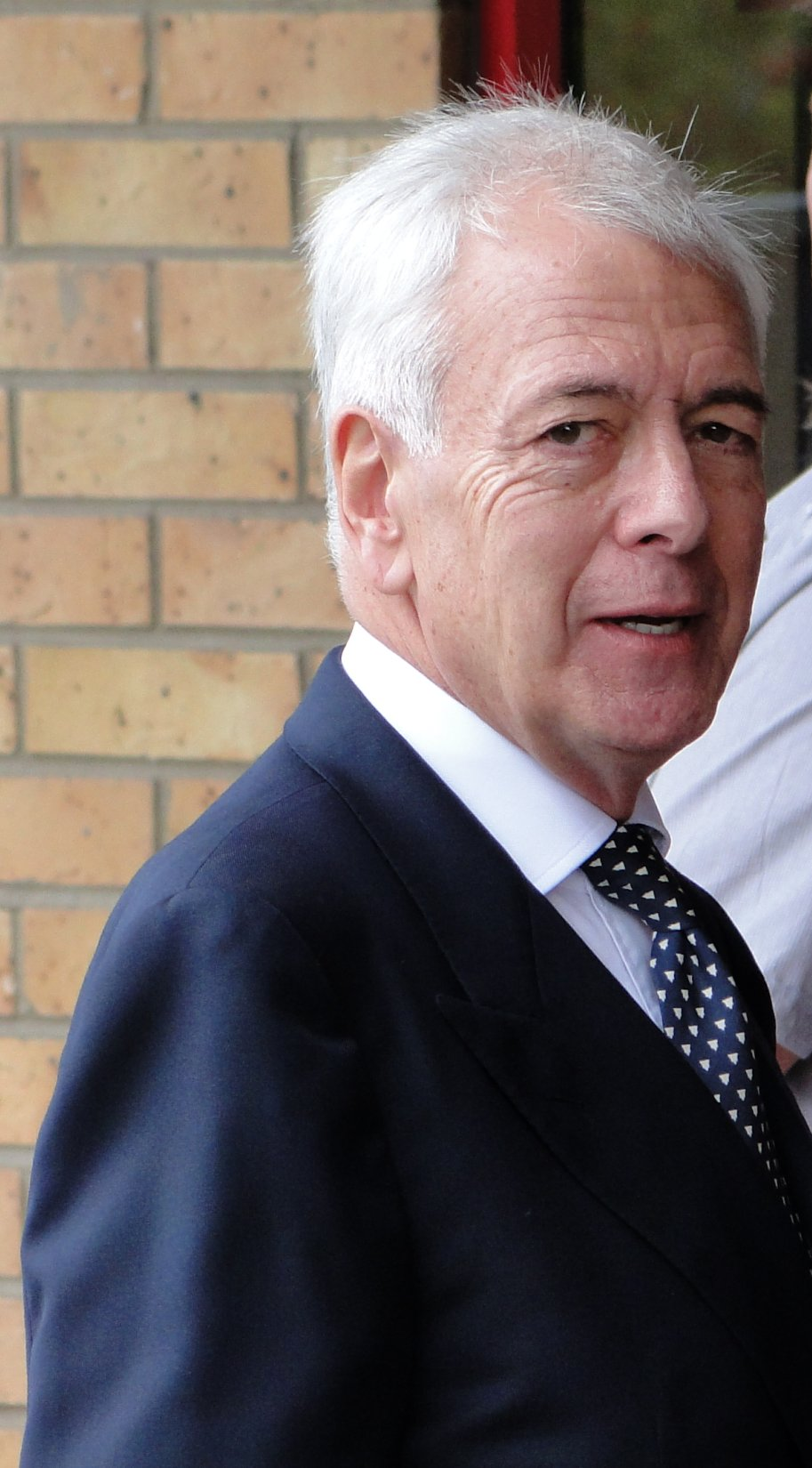
Honorary Life President, investor and former owner and chairman, Terry Brown

Terry Brown joined the board in November 1990 and was chairman from May 1992. Brown was criticised by some sections of the fans (including pressure group Whistle specifically formed for this purpose) due to a perception of financial and staff mismanagement. In 2006 he made £33.4m after selling the club for £85m to an Icelandic consortium.

=== Icelandic consortium ===
In 2006 Eggert Magnússon and Björgólfur Guðmundsson bought the club. On 18 September 2007, Magnússon stepped down as executive chairman but would still retain the role as club non-executive chairman overseeing a new management structure, and would keep his stake in the club.

On 13 December 2007, Magnússon left West Ham and his 5% holding was bought by club majority owner Björgólfur Guðmundsson.

On 8 June 2009 during the 2008–2012 Icelandic financial crisis, Icelandic CB Holding which is 70% owned by Straumur-Burdaras bank and 30% owned by Icelandic-based banks Byr and MP took over Hansa Holding, which had West Ham United as their only asset and filed for bankruptcy protection. Straumur was one of Hansa Holding's largest creditors. Straumur appointed one of their directors, Andrew Bernhardt, as the new chairman of CB Holding, a company set up to manage the affairs of West Ham United.

=== David Sullivan, David Gold and Vanessa Gold ===
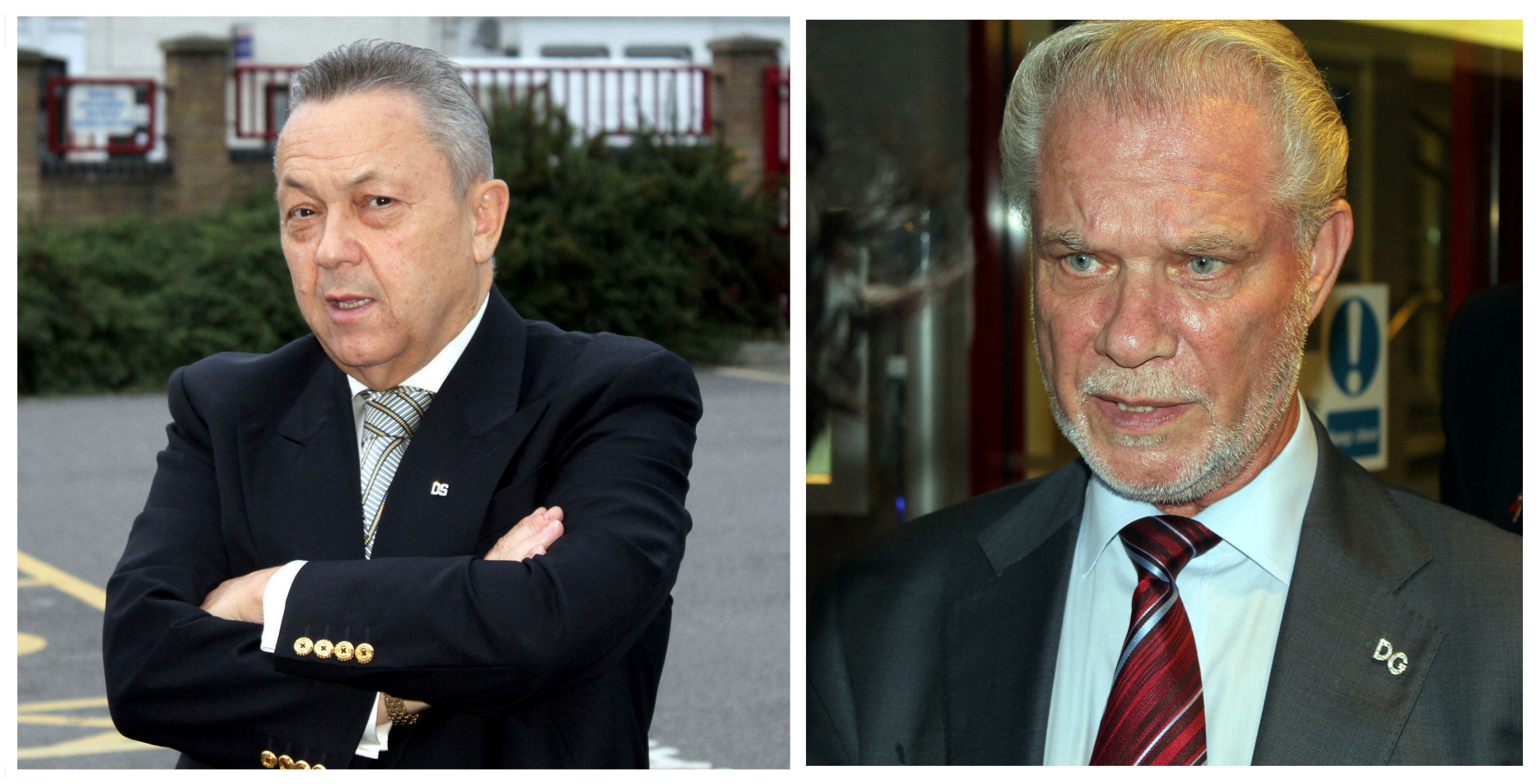
West Ham United co-owners, David Sullivan and David Gold

In January 2010, David Sullivan and David Gold acquired a 50% share in West Ham, from CB Holding, giving them overall operational and commercial control. At the end of May 2010 Gold and Sullivan purchased a further 10% stake in the club at a cost of £8 million (£4m to CB Holding, £4m towards club debts). Taking their controlling stake to 60%, they announced that in the near future they may open up shares for fans to purchase. On 9 August 2010, Gold and Sullivan increased their shares up to 30.6% each with "minority investors", (which included former owner Terry Brown, purchasing a further 3.8% of the club at a cost of around £3-4million) leaving Straumur Bank owning 35% of the club.

On 2 July 2013, it was announced Sullivan had acquired a further 25% of shares from CB Holdings (owned by the Icelandic bank), after restructuring the debt of the club, leaving Straumur Bank with just 10%. In order to clear club debts before a move to the Olympic Stadium in 2016, in December 2014 Sullivan announced the availability for sale of 20% of the club. The clearing of club debts, given in July 2013 as £70m, is pre-condition to moving to the Olympic Stadium.

Gold died on 4 January 2023, aged 86. Seven months later, Gold's daughter Vanessa became joint-chair with Sullivan. On 6 June 2026, Sullivan stood down as chairman.

=== Chairmen ===
| Years | Chairman | Notes |
|---|---|---|
| 1900–03 | Lazzeluer Johnson | Clerk, director 1900–1932. Subscriber to the Articles of Incorporation 5 July 1900. First chairman, taking over from Arnold Hills chairman of West Ham's predecessor, Thames Ironworks |
| 1903–04 | Edwin Smith | Timber converter, director 1900–1903. Subscriber to the Articles of Incorporation 5 July 1900. |
| 1904–09 | Joseph Grisdale | Coppersmith, director 1904–1909. |
| 1909–35 | William F White | Barge builder, director 1905–1935. |
| 1935–50 | William J Cearns | Contractor, director 1924–1950. Self-made millionaire from the construction industry. His eldest son, also William, served as a director from 1950 on the death of his father and vice-chairman from June 1979 until 1991 |
| 1950–79 | Reg Pratt | Timber merchant, director 1941–1979. Succeeded father F R Pratt, timber merchant, director 1924–1941. Oversaw the set-up of the youth teams and training methods which led to The Academy of Football and the establishment of training facilities at Chadwell Heath. In May 1959 negotiated the purchase of the freehold of the Boleyn Ground from the Roman Catholic Archdiocese of Westminster for £30,000. |
| 1979–90 | Len Cearns | Contractor, director 1948–1993; Son of William J Cearns he was vice-chairman from 1950 and his contracting company responsible for building the East stand in 1969, and relinquished his chairmanship to his son Martin in February 1990. |
| 1990–92 | Martin Cearns | A bank manager with Barclays Bank when he "inherited" the role from his father. Advocate of the Hammers Bond scheme He became vice-chairman on Terry Brown becoming chairman in May 1992 |
| 1992–2006 | Terry Brown | Became a director in November 1990 and chairman in May 1992. |
| 2006–07 | Eggert Magnússon | |
| 2007–09 | Björgólfur Guðmundsson | |
| 2009–10 | Andrew Bernhardt Non-executive chairman – CB Holding | West Ham were taken over by asset management company CB Holding following Guðmundsson's bankruptcy caused by the 2008–2012 Icelandic financial crisis. |
| 2010–2023 | David Sullivan and David Gold – joint | With the club valued at £105m, Sullivan and Gold buy 50%. They inherited £120m of debt from the previous owners. Gold died on 4 January 2023, aged 86. |
| 2023 | David Sullivan | Sullivan served as sole chairman for 7 months following Gold's death. |
| 2023–2026 | David Sullivan and Vanessa Gold – joint | In August 2023, David Gold's daughter, Vanessa, joined as co-chair alongside Sullivan |
| 2026– | Vanessa Gold | On 6 June 2026, Sullivan stood down as chairman. |
