= 1971 UEFA European Under-18 Championship =

Tournament details
- Host country: Czechoslovakia
- Dates: 22–30 May
- Teams: 16

Final positions
- Champions: England (4th title)
- Runners-up: Portugal
- Third place: East Germany
- Fourth place: Soviet Union

The UEFA European Under-18 Championship 1971 Final Tournament was held in Czechoslovakia.

Best player: Trevor Francis (ENG)

Best goalkeeper: António Fidalgo (POR)

== Qualification ==
=== Group 1 ===
Teams	Pld	W	D	L	GF	GA	GD	Pts
Belgium	4	3	1	0	10	3	+7	7
Netherlands	4	2	1	1	9	3	+6	5
Luxembourg	4	0	0	4	1	14	–13	0

Belgium	4–1	Luxembourg
Netherlands	4–0	Luxembourg
Belgium	1–0	Netherlands
Luxembourg	0–3	Belgium
Luxembourg	0–3	Netherlands
Netherlands	2–2	Belgium

=== Group 2 ===
Teams	Pld	W	D	L	GF	GA	GD	Pts
Sweden	2	2	0	0	9	1	+8	4
Norway	2	1	0	1	2	3	–1	2
Finland	2	0	0	2	1	8	–7	0

Sweden	6–1	Finland
Sweden	3–0	Norway
Norway	2–0	Finland

=== Group 3 ===
Teams	Pld	W	D	L	GF	GA	GD	Pts
Wales	4	2	2	0	9	2	+7	6
Scotland	4	2	1	1	7	4	+3	5
Iceland	4	0	1	3	4	14	–10	1

Iceland	1–1	Wales
Iceland	1–3	Scotland
Scotland	4–1	Iceland
Wales	6–1	Iceland
Scotland	0–2	Wales
Wales	0–0	Scotland

=== Group 4 ===
Teams	Pld	W	D	L	GF	GA	GD	Pts
Bulgaria	4	2	2	0	5	3	+2	6
Romania	4	1	2	1	3	3	0	4
Turkey	4	0	2	2	3	5	–2	2

Bulgaria	3–2	Turkey
Romania	0–0	Turkey
Bulgaria	1–0	Romania
Romania	1–1	Bulgaria
Turkey	1–2	Romania
Turkey	0–0	Bulgaria

=== Groups 5-8 ===
Team 1	Agg.	Team 2	1st leg	2nd leg
Portugal	3–2	France	3–2	0–0
Malta	0–2	Switzerland	0–0	0–2
West Germany	1–0	Italy	0–0	1–0
Poland	1–0	Hungary	0–0	1–0

13 February 1971

Portugal	3 – 2	France
Ibraim 10'; Eurico 43'; Nando 46'	Report

Tapadinha, Lisbon
25 March 1971

France	0 – 0	Portugal
	Report

== Teams ==
The following teams entered the tournament. Eight teams qualified (Q) and eight teams entered without playing qualification matches.

- Austria
- Belgium (Q)
- Bulgaria (Q)
- Czechoslovakia (host)
- East Germany
- England
- West Germany (Q)
- Greece
- Poland (Q)
- Portugal (Q)
- Soviet Union
- Spain
- Sweden (Q)
- Switzerland (Q)
- Wales (Q)
- Yugoslavia

== Group stage ==
=== Group A ===
Teams	Pld	W	D	L	GF	GA	GD	Pts
Portugal	3	3	0	0	3	0	+3	6
Spain	3	1	1	1	2	2	0	3
Switzerland	3	1	0	2	1	2	–1	2
Austria	3	0	1	2	1	3	–2	1

22 May	Austria	1–1	Spain
	Portugal	1–0	Switzerland
24 May	Portugal	1–0	Austria
	Spain	1–0	Switzerland
26 May	Switzerland	1–0	Austria
	Portugal	1–0	Spain

=== Group B ===
Teams	Pld	W	D	L	GF	GA	GD	Pts
Soviet Union	3	2	1	0	10	4	+6	5
Belgium	3	2	1	0	8	3	+5	5
Wales	3	0	1	2	3	5	–2	1
Bulgaria	3	0	1	2	2	11	–9	1

22 May	Soviet Union	5–0	Bulgaria
	Belgium	1–0	Wales
24 May	Soviet Union	2–2	Belgium
	Bulgaria	1–1	Wales
26 May	Soviet Union	3–2	Wales
	Belgium	5–1	Bulgaria

=== Group C ===
Teams	Pld	W	D	L	GF	GA	GD	Pts
East Germany	3	2	1	0	10	4	+6	5
Czechoslovakia	3	1	2	0	5	3	+2	4
Greece	3	1	0	2	6	10	–4	2
West Germany	3	0	1	2	3	7	–4	1

22 May	East Germany	5–1	Greece
	Czechoslovakia	0–0	West Germany
24 May	East Germany	2–2	Czechoslovakia
	Greece	4–2	West Germany
26 May	East Germany	3–1	West Germany
	Czechoslovakia	3–1	Greece

=== Group D ===
Teams	Pld	W	D	L	GF	GA	GD	Pts
England	3	2	1	0	2	0	+2	5
Yugoslavia	3	2	0	1	8	4	+4	4
Poland	3	0	2	1	2	6	–4	2
Sweden	3	0	1	2	3	5	–2	1

22 May	Poland	1–1	Sweden
	England	1–0	Yugoslavia
24 May	Yugoslavia	5–1	Poland
	England	1–0	Sweden
26 May	England	0–0	Poland
	Yugoslavia	3–2	Sweden

== Semifinals ==
28 May 1971

Portugal	2 – 1	East Germany
	Report

Ďolíček, Prague
28 May 1971

England	1 – 1	Soviet Union
	Report
Penalties
	4 – 2

Ďolíček, Prague

== Third place match ==
30 May 1971

East Germany	1 – 1	Soviet Union
	Report
Penalties
	5 – 3

Letná, Prague

== Final ==
30 May 1971

England	3 – 0	Portugal
Ayris; Eastoe; Eastoe	Report

Letná, Prague

ENGLAND: (England) Tilsed (England) Dugdale (England) Dillon (England) Parker (England) Shanks (England) McGuire (England) Busby (England) Ayris (England) Francis (England) Eastoe (England) Daley	PORTUGAL: (Portugal) António Fidalgo (Portugal) Franque (Portugal) Casquinha (Portugal) Pereira (Portugal) Jaime (Portugal) Shéu (Portugal) Alexandre (Portugal) Gregório Freixo (Portugal) Eurico (Portugal) Nando (Portugal) Rui Jordão

1971 UEFA European Under-18 Championship

England
Fourth title
