= 1993–94 FA Premier League =

Football season in England

FA Premier League
- Season: 1993–94
- Dates: 14 August 1993 – 8 May 1994
- Champions: Manchester United; 2nd Premier League title 9th English title
- Relegated: Sheffield United; Oldham Athletic; Swindon Town
- Champions League: Manchester United
- Cup Winners' Cup: Arsenal; Chelsea
- UEFA Cup: Blackburn Rovers; Newcastle United; Aston Villa
- Matches: 462
- Goals: 1,195 (2.59 per match)
- Top goalscorer: Andy Cole (34 goals)
- Best goalkeeper: David Seaman (19 clean sheets)
- Biggest home win: Newcastle United 7–1 Swindon Town (12 March 1994)
- Biggest away win: Swindon Town 0–5 Liverpool (22 August 1993); Swindon Town 0–5 Leeds United (7 May 1994)
- Highest scoring: Norwich City 4–5 Southampton (9 April 1994)
- Longest winning run: 8 games Manchester United
- Longest unbeaten run: 22 games Manchester United
- Longest winless run: 15 games Swindon Town
- Longest losing run: 7 games Tottenham Hotspur
- Highest attendance: 45,347; Aston Villa 2–1 Liverpool (7 May 1994)
- Lowest attendance: 4,739; Wimbledon 1–2 Coventry City (26 December 1993)
- Total attendance: 10,642,228
- Average attendance: 23,035

The 1993–94 FA Premier League (known as the FA Carling Premiership for sponsorship reasons) was the second season of the FA Premier League, the top division of professional football in England. Manchester United won the league by eight points over nearest challengers Blackburn Rovers, their second consecutive league title. Swindon Town finished bottom of the league in their first season of top-flight football and were relegated along with Sheffield United and Oldham Athletic. Manchester United also broke their own record of the most points in a season, set by themselves the previous season. This would be surpassed by Chelsea in the 2004–05 season.

== Overview ==
=== New league sponsors ===
From the start of the 1993–94 season, the FA Premier League was sponsored by Carling Breweries.

=== Transfers ===
Just before the start of the season, Roy Keane became the most expensive footballer signed by an English football team. The 22-year-old Irish midfielder left relegated Nottingham Forest for Manchester United for a fee of £3.75 million.

During the 1993–94 season, many players were transferred between Premier League clubs for fees exceeding £1 million. They included David White (Manchester City to Leeds United), David Rocastle (Leeds United to Manchester City), Roy Wegerle (Blackburn Rovers to Coventry City) and Tim Flowers (Southampton to Blackburn Rovers). At £2.5 million, Flowers became the most expensive goalkeeper in English football.

=== Summary ===
Manchester United led the 1993–94 Premier League for almost all of the season, eventually finishing as champions eight points ahead of runners-up Blackburn Rovers. They also won the FA Cup after beating Chelsea 4–0 in the final, thereby becoming only the fourth team to achieve this feat in the 20th century (after Tottenham in 1961, Arsenal in 1971 and Liverpool in 1986). Their lead of the Premier League stood at 11 points by the end of October and peaked at 16 points at one stage, but a run of bad results in March was followed by defeat at Blackburn at the beginning of April, which meant that they now led the league merely on goal difference. A return to form towards the end of April then saw United seal the league title with two games still to play.

Norwich City, Leeds United, Newcastle United, Everton and Aston Villa were among the sides who showed promise early in the season before Manchester United established a runaway lead. Norwich reached the third round of the UEFA Cup after famously beating Bayern Munich in the second round, but their league form slumped after manager Mike Walker departed to Everton in January, and the Norfolk side finished 12th. Everton's brief lead of the league in the opening stages of the season was followed by a slump in form, and manager Howard Kendall stepped down at the beginning of December with the Toffees now in the bottom half of the table. They only narrowly avoided relegation on the final day of the season. Aston Villa finished a disappointing 10th in the league, but won the Football League Cup for the fourth time.

Finishing runners-up in the Premier League were Blackburn Rovers, whose top scorer Alan Shearer found the net 31 times in the league. In third place came Newcastle United, whose 22-year-old striker Andy Cole was the Premier League's leading scorer with 34 goals in 40 games, with a total of 41 goals in all competitions. In fourth place came Arsenal, who achieved success in European competition with a 1–0 win over Parma in the Cup Winners' Cup final.

Swindon Town managed just five league wins all season and were relegated in bottom place having conceded 100 league goals in 42 games; their record for the most goals conceded in a Premier League season would last for three decades before it was surpassed by Sheffield United in 2024, though this is lower than the all-time record of 125 goals against Blackpool in the 1930-31 Football League, a season in which Manchester United were relegated, unlike Blackpool, with 115 goals conceded. Oldham Athletic, who had avoided relegation on goal difference the previous season, were relegated on the final day of the season after failing to win at Norwich City. The final relegation place went to Sheffield United, who were relegated from the top flight after a 3–2 defeat at Chelsea, with the winning goal coming in injury time (a draw would have been enough to survive, and a loss would have still been enough had Everton not won their final match, 3–2 at home to Wimbledon after coming from 0–2 down). Ipswich Town, who failed to win any of their final 11 games, avoided relegation by holding Blackburn to a goalless draw at Ewood Park, and were less than a minute from being relegated, only to be saved by Chelsea’s late win over Sheffield United.

== Teams ==
Twenty-two teams competed in the league—the top nineteen teams from the previous season and the three teams promoted from the First Division. The promoted teams were Newcastle United, West Ham United and Swindon Town. Newcastle United and West Ham United returned to the top flight after absences of four and one year, respectively, while Swindon Town played in the top flight for the first time. They replaced Crystal Palace, Middlesbrough and Nottingham Forest, who were relegated to the First Division after their top flight spells of four, one and sixteen years, respectively.

=== Stadiums and locations ===
Locations of the 1993–94 Premier League teams
Greater London Premier League football clubs
Greater Manchester Premier League football clubs

Team	Location	Stadium	Capacity
Arsenal	London (Highbury)	Highbury	38,419
Aston Villa	Birmingham	Villa Park	39,399
Blackburn Rovers	Blackburn	Ewood Park	31,367
Chelsea	London (Fulham)	Stamford Bridge	36,000
Coventry City	Coventry	Highfield Road	23,489
Everton	Liverpool (Walton)	Goodison Park	40,157
Ipswich Town	Ipswich	Portman Road	30,300
Leeds United	Leeds	Elland Road	40,204
Liverpool	Liverpool (Anfield)	Anfield	42,730
Manchester City	Manchester (Moss Side)	Maine Road	35,150
Manchester United	Manchester (Old Trafford)	Old Trafford	55,314
Newcastle United	Newcastle upon Tyne	St James' Park	36,649
Norwich City	Norwich	Carrow Road	27,010
Oldham Athletic	Oldham	Boundary Park	13,512
Queens Park Rangers	London (Shepherd's Bush)	Loftus Road	18,439
Sheffield United	Sheffield (Highfield)	Bramall Lane	32,702
Sheffield Wednesday	Sheffield (Owlerton)	Hillsborough Stadium	39,859
Southampton	Southampton	The Dell	15,200
Swindon Town	Swindon	County Ground	18,152
Tottenham Hotspur	London (Tottenham)	White Hart Lane	36,230
West Ham United	London (Upton Park)	Boleyn Ground	28,000
Wimbledon	London (Selhurst)	Selhurst Park (Note: Due to Wimbledon lacking a home stadium, they played their home games at Selhurst Park, which is the home stadium of Crystal Palace.)	26,309

=== Personnel and kits ===
(as of 8 May 1994)

Team	Manager	Captain	Kit manufacturer	Shirt sponsor
Arsenal	(Scotland) George Graham	(England) Tony Adams	Adidas	JVC
Aston Villa	(England) Ron Atkinson	(England) Kevin Richardson	Asics	Müller
Blackburn Rovers	(Scotland) Kenny Dalglish	(England) Tim Sherwood	Asics	McEwan's Lager
Chelsea	(England) Glenn Hoddle	(England) Dennis Wise	Umbro	Amiga
Coventry City	(England) Phil Neal	(England) Brian Borrows	Ribero	Peugeot
Everton	(Wales) Mike Walker	(England) Dave Watson	Umbro	NEC
Ipswich Town	(England) John Lyall	(England) Steve Palmer	Umbro	Fisons
Leeds United	(England) Howard Wilkinson	(Scotland) Gordon Strachan	Asics	Thistle Hotels
Liverpool	(England) Roy Evans	(Wales) Ian Rush	Adidas	Carlsberg
Manchester City	(England) Brian Horton	(England) Keith Curle	Umbro	Brother
Manchester United	(Scotland) Alex Ferguson	(England) Bryan Robson	Umbro	Sharp
Newcastle United	(England) Kevin Keegan	(England) Peter Beardsley	Asics	McEwan's Lager
Norwich City	(England) John Deehan	(England) Ian Butterworth	Ribero	Norwich and Peterborough
Oldham Athletic	(England) Joe Royle	(Republic of Ireland) Mike Milligan	Umbro	JD Sports
Queens Park Rangers	(England) Gerry Francis	(England) David Bardsley	Clubhouse	CSF
Sheffield United	(England) Dave Bassett	(England) Brian Gayle	Umbro	Laver
Sheffield Wednesday	(England) Trevor Francis	(England) Chris Waddle	Puma	Sanderson
Southampton	(England) Alan Ball	(England) Matt Le Tissier	Pony	Dimplex
Swindon Town	(Scotland) John Gorman	(England) Shaun Taylor	Loki	Burmah
Tottenham Hotspur	(Argentina) Osvaldo Ardiles	(England) Gary Mabbutt	Umbro	Holsten
West Ham United	(England) Billy Bonds	(England) Steve Potts	Pony	Dagenham Motors
Wimbledon	(Republic of Ireland) Joe Kinnear	(Wales) Vinnie Jones	Ribero	LBC

=== Managerial changes ===
Team	Outgoing manager	Manner of departure	Date of vacancy	Position in table	Incoming manager	Date of appointment
Chelsea	(England) David Webb	End of caretaker spell	11 May 1993	Pre-season	(England) Glenn Hoddle	4 June 1993
Ipswich Town	(England) John Lyall	Promoted to Director of Football	30 May 1993	Pre-season	(England) Mick McGiven	1 June 1993
Swindon Town	(England) Glenn Hoddle	Signed by Chelsea	4 June 1993	Pre-season	(Scotland) John Gorman	4 June 1993
Tottenham Hotspur	(England) Doug Livermore (England) Ray Clemence	Sacked	19 June 1993	Pre-season	(Argentina) Osvaldo Ardiles	19 June 1993
Manchester City	(England) Peter Reid	Sacked	26 August 1993	20th	(England) Tony Book (caretaker)	27 August 1993
Manchester City	(England) Tony Book	End of caretaker spell	28 August 1993	17th	(England) Brian Horton	28 August 1993
Coventry City	(England) Bobby Gould	Resigned	23 October 1993	14th	(England) Phil Neal	23 October 1993
Everton	(England) Howard Kendall	Resigned	4 December 1993	13th	(Scotland) Jimmy Gabriel (caretaker)	4 December 1993
Everton	(Scotland) Jimmy Gabriel	End of caretaker spell	6 January 1994	19th	(Wales) Mike Walker	6 January 1994
Norwich City	(Wales) Mike Walker	Signed by Everton	6 January 1994	8th	(England) John Deehan	6 January 1994
Southampton	(England) Ian Branfoot	Sacked	10 January 1994	21st	(England) Dave Merrington (caretaker)	10 January 1994
Southampton	(England) Dave Merrington	End of caretaker spell	20 January 1994	20th	(England) Alan Ball	20 January 1994
Liverpool	(Scotland) Graeme Souness	Sacked	28 January 1994	5th	(England) Roy Evans	30 January 1994
Ipswich Town	(England) Mick McGiven	Became assistant manager	15 February 1994	14th	(England) John Lyall	16 February 1994

== League table ==
Pos	Team	Pld	W	D	L	GF	GA	GD	Pts	Qualification or relegation
1	Manchester United (C)	42	27	11	4	80	38	+42	92	Qualification for the Champions League group stage
2	Blackburn Rovers	42	25	9	8	63	36	+27	84	Qualification for the UEFA Cup first round
3	Newcastle United	42	23	8	11	82	41	+41	77	Qualification for the UEFA Cup first round
4	Arsenal	42	18	17	7	53	28	+25	71	Qualification for the Cup Winners' Cup first round (Note: Arsenal qualified for the Cup Winners' Cup as the defending champions.)
5	Leeds United	42	18	16	8	65	39	+26	70	
6	Wimbledon	42	18	11	13	56	53	+3	65	
7	Sheffield Wednesday	42	16	16	10	76	54	+22	64	
8	Liverpool	42	17	9	16	59	55	+4	60	
9	Queens Park Rangers	42	16	12	14	62	61	+1	60	
10	Aston Villa	42	15	12	15	46	50	−4	57	Qualification for the UEFA Cup first round (Note: Aston Villa qualified for the UEFA Cup as League Cup winners.)
11	Coventry City	42	14	14	14	43	45	−2	56	
12	Norwich City	42	12	17	13	65	61	+4	53	
13	West Ham United	42	13	13	16	47	58	−11	52	
14	Chelsea	42	13	12	17	49	53	−4	51	Qualification for the Cup Winners' Cup first round (Note: Chelsea qualified for the Cup Winners' Cup as FA Cup runners-up, as winners Manchester United qualified for the Champions League.)
15	Tottenham Hotspur	42	11	12	19	54	59	−5	45	
16	Manchester City	42	9	18	15	38	49	−11	45	
17	Everton	42	12	8	22	42	63	−21	44	
18	Southampton	42	12	7	23	49	66	−17	43	
19	Ipswich Town	42	9	16	17	35	58	−23	43	
20	Sheffield United (R)	42	8	18	16	42	60	−18	42	Relegation to Football League First Division
21	Oldham Athletic (R)	42	9	13	20	42	68	−26	40	Relegation to Football League First Division
22	Swindon Town (R)	42	5	15	22	47	100	−53	30	Relegation to Football League First Division

Source: Premier League
Rules for classification: 1) points; 2) goal difference; 3) number of goals scored.
(C) Champions; (R) Relegated

== Results ==
Home \ Away	ARS	AVL	BLB	CHE	COV	EVE	IPS	LEE	LIV	MCI	MUN	NEW	NOR	OLD	QPR	SHU	SHW	SOU	SWI	TOT	WHU	WIM
Arsenal	—	1–2	1–0	1–0	0–3	2–0	4–0	2–1	1–0	0–0	2–2	2–1	0–0	1–1	0–0	3–0	1–0	1–0	1–1	1–1	0–2	1–1
Aston Villa	1–2	—	0–1	1–0	0–0	0–0	0–1	1–0	2–1	0–0	1–2	0–2	0–0	1–2	4–1	1–0	2–2	0–2	5–0	1–0	3–1	0–1
Blackburn Rovers	1–1	1–0	—	2–0	2–1	2–0	0–0	2–1	2–0	2–0	2–0	1–0	2–3	1–0	1–1	0–0	1–1	2–0	3–1	1–0	0–2	3–0
Chelsea	0–2	1–1	1–2	—	1–2	4–2	1–1	1–1	1–0	0–0	1–0	1–0	1–2	0–1	2–0	3–2	1–1	2–0	2–0	4–3	2–0	2–0
Coventry City	1–0	0–1	2–1	1–1	—	2–1	1–0	0–2	1–0	4–0	0–1	2–1	2–1	1–1	0–1	0–0	1–1	1–1	1–1	1–0	1–1	1–2
Everton	1–1	0–1	0–3	4–2	0–0	—	0–0	1–1	2–0	1–0	0–1	0–2	1–5	2–1	0–3	4–2	0–2	1–0	6–2	0–1	0–1	3–2
Ipswich Town	1–5	1–2	1–0	1–0	0–2	0–2	—	0–0	1–2	2–2	1–2	1–1	2–1	0–0	1–3	3–2	1–4	1–0	1–1	2–2	1–1	0–0
Leeds United	2–1	2–0	3–3	4–1	1–0	3–0	0–0	—	2–0	3–2	0–2	1–1	0–4	1–0	1–1	2–1	2–2	0–0	3–0	2–0	1–0	4–0
Liverpool	0–0	2–1	0–1	2–1	1–0	2–1	1–0	2–0	—	2–1	3–3	0–2	0–1	2–1	3–2	1–2	2–0	4–2	2–2	1–2	2–0	1–1
Manchester City	0–0	3–0	0–2	2–2	1–1	1–0	2–1	1–1	1–1	—	2–3	2–1	1–1	1–1	3–0	0–0	1–3	1–1	2–1	0–2	0–0	0–1
Manchester United	1–0	3–1	1–1	0–1	0–0	1–0	0–0	0–0	1–0	2–0	—	1–1	2–2	3–2	2–1	3–0	5–0	2–0	4–2	2–1	3–0	3–1
Newcastle United	2–0	5–1	1–1	0–0	4–0	1–0	2–0	1–1	3–0	2–0	1–1	—	3–0	3–2	1–2	4–0	4–2	1–2	7–1	0–1	2–0	4–0
Norwich City	1–1	1–2	2–2	1–1	1–0	3–0	1–0	2–1	2–2	1–1	0–2	1–2	—	1–1	3–4	0–1	1–1	4–5	0–0	1–2	0–0	0–1
Oldham Athletic	0–0	1–1	1–2	2–1	3–3	0–1	0–3	1–1	0–3	0–0	2–5	1–3	2–1	—	4–1	1–1	0–0	2–1	2–1	0–2	1–2	1–1
Queens Park Rangers	1–1	2–2	1–0	1–1	5–1	2–1	3–0	0–4	1–3	1–1	2–3	1–2	2–2	2–0	—	2–1	1–2	2–1	1–3	1–1	0–0	1–0
Sheffield United	1–1	1–2	1–2	1–0	0–0	0–0	1–1	2–2	0–0	0–1	0–3	2–0	1–2	2–1	1–1	—	1–1	0–0	3–1	2–2	3–2	2–1
Sheffield Wednesday	0–1	0–0	1–2	3–1	0–0	5–1	5–0	3–3	3–1	1–1	2–3	0–1	3–3	3–0	3–1	3–1	—	2–0	3–3	1–0	5–0	2–2
Southampton	0–4	4–1	3–1	3–1	1–0	0–2	0–1	0–2	4–2	0–1	1–3	2–1	0–1	1–3	0–1	3–3	1–1	—	5–1	1–0	0–2	1–0
Swindon Town	0–4	1–2	1–3	1–3	3–1	1–1	2–2	0–5	0–5	1–3	2–2	2–2	3–3	0–1	1–0	0–0	0–1	2–1	—	2–1	1–1	2–4
Tottenham Hotspur	0–1	1–1	0–2	1–1	1–2	3–2	1–1	1–1	3–3	1–0	0–1	1–2	1–3	5–0	1–2	2–2	1–3	3–0	1–1	—	1–4	1–1
West Ham United	0–0	0–0	1–2	1–0	3–2	0–1	2–1	0–1	1–2	3–1	2–2	2–4	3–3	2–0	0–4	0–0	2–0	3–3	0–0	1–3	—	0–2
Wimbledon	0–3	2–2	4–1	1–1	1–2	1–1	0–2	1–0	1–1	1–0	1–0	4–2	3–1	3–0	1–1	2–0	2–1	1–0	3–0	2–1	1–2	—

Source: Premier League
Legend: Blue = home team win; Yellow = draw; Red = away team win.

== Season statistics ==
=== Top scorers ===
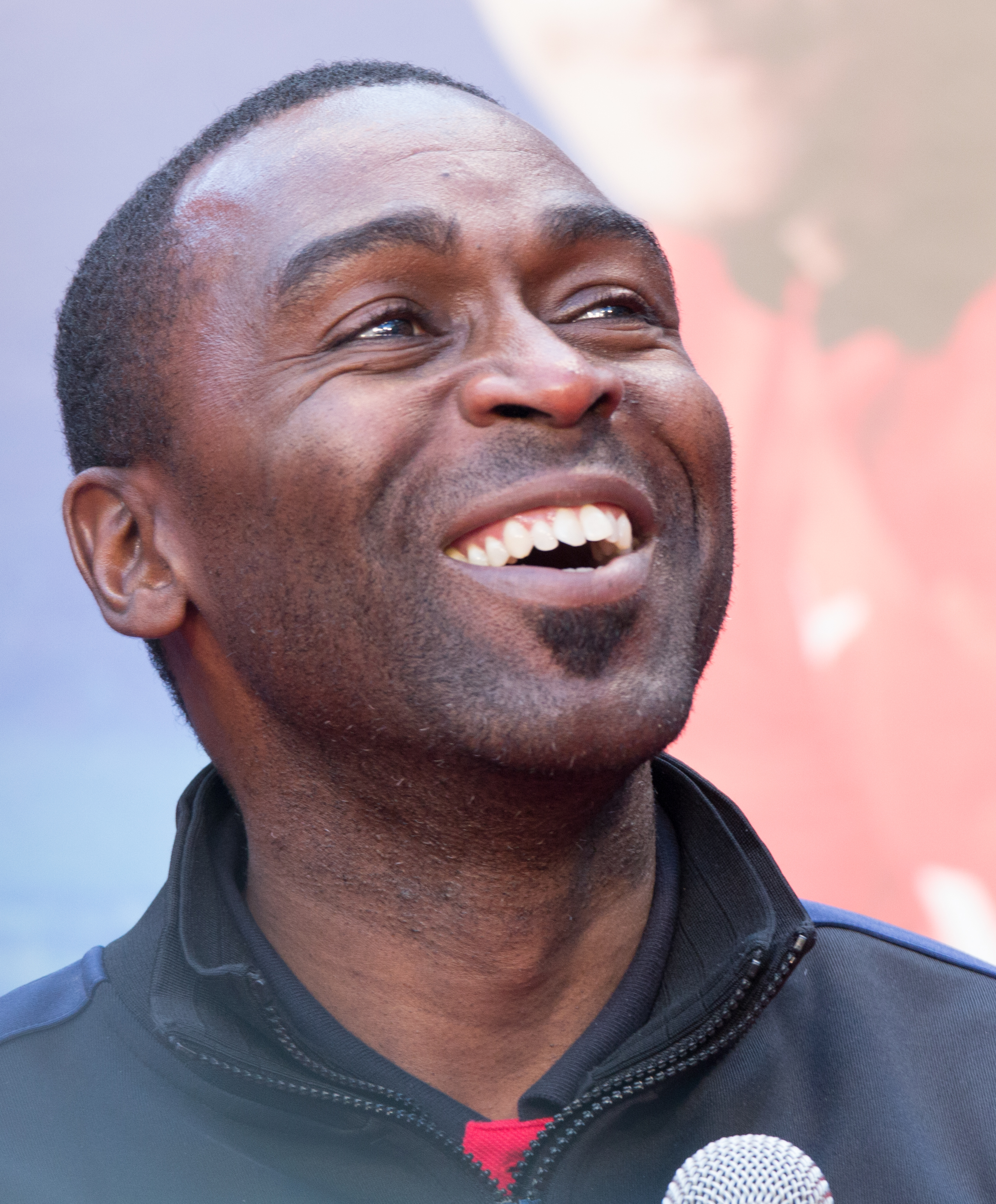
Newcastle's Andy Cole was the top scorer in the 1993–94 Premier League season, with 34 goals. In addition, he also assisted 13 goals for the club over the season.

Rank	Player	Club	Goals
1	(England) Andy Cole	Newcastle United	34
2	(England) Alan Shearer	Blackburn Rovers	31
3	(England) Matt Le Tissier	Southampton	25
3	(England) Chris Sutton	Norwich City	25
5	(England) Ian Wright	Arsenal	23
6	(England) Peter Beardsley	Newcastle United	21
7	(England) Mark Bright	Sheffield Wednesday	19
8	(France) Eric Cantona	Manchester United	18
9	(England) Dean Holdsworth	Wimbledon	17
9	(England) Rod Wallace	Leeds United	17
10	(England) Tony Cottee	Everton	16
10	(England) Les Ferdinand	Queens Park Rangers	16

==== Hat-tricks ====
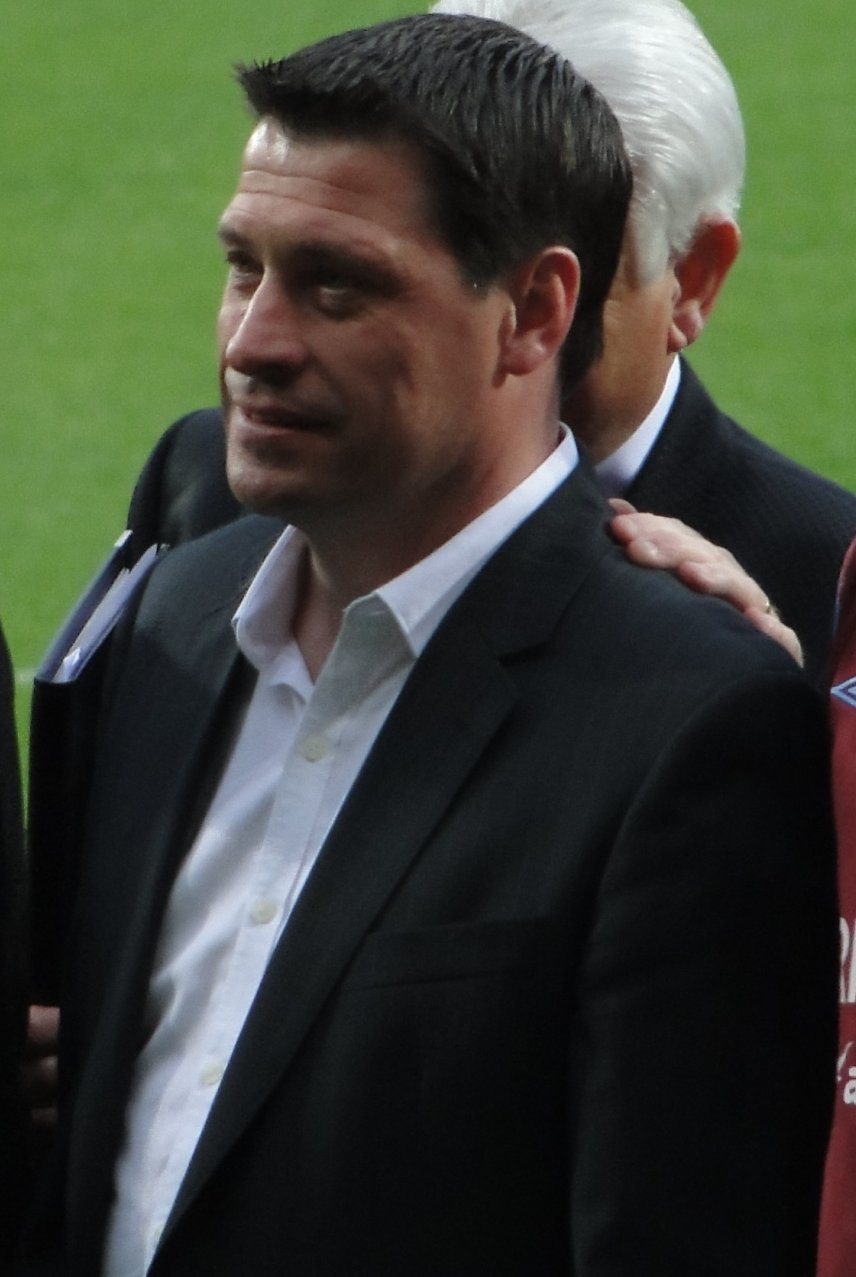
Tony Cottee was one of five players who scored more than one hat-trick in the 1993–94 Premier League season.

Player	For	Against	Result	Date
(England) Micky Quinn	Coventry City	Arsenal	3–0 (A)	14 August 1993
(England) Tony Cottee	Everton	Sheffield United	4–2 (H)	21 August 1993
(England) Kevin Campbell	Arsenal	Ipswich Town	4–0 (H)	11 September 1993
(Nigeria) Efan Ekoku^{4}	Norwich City	Everton	5–1 (A)	25 September 1993
(England) Alan Shearer	Blackburn Rovers	Leeds United	3–3 (A)	23 October 1993
(England) Peter Beardsley	Newcastle United	Wimbledon	4–0 (H)	30 October 1993
(England) Robbie Fowler	Liverpool	Southampton	4–2 (H)	30 October 1993
(England) Bradley Allen	Queens Park Rangers	Everton	3–0 (A)	20 November 1993
(England) Andy Cole	Newcastle United	Liverpool	3–0 (H)	21 November 1993
(England) Kevin Campbell	Arsenal	Swindon Town	4–0 (A)	27 December 1993
(England) Tony Cottee	Everton	Swindon Town	6–2 (H)	15 January 1994
(Norway) Jan Åge Fjørtoft	Swindon Town	Coventry City	3–1 (H)	5 February 1994
(Wales) Dean Saunders	Aston Villa	Swindon Town	5–0 (H)	12 February 1994
(England) Matt Le Tissier	Southampton	Liverpool	4–2 (H)	14 February 1994
(England) Andy Cole	Newcastle United	Coventry City	4–0 (H)	23 February 1994
(England) Ian Wright	Arsenal	Ipswich Town	5–1 (A)	5 March 1994
(England) Ian Wright	Arsenal	Southampton	4–0 (A)	19 March 1994
(England) Matt Le Tissier	Southampton	Norwich City	5–4 (A)	9 April 1994
(England) Dean Holdsworth	Wimbledon	Oldham Athletic	3–0 (H)	26 April 1994

Note: ^{4} – player scored 4 goals; (H) – Home; (A) – Away

=== Clean sheets ===
Rank	Player	Club	Clean sheets
1	(England) David Seaman	Arsenal	19
2	(Denmark) Peter Schmeichel	Manchester United	15
3	(Czech Republic) Luděk Mikloško	West Ham United	14
4	(England) Tim Flowers	Southampton / Blackburn Rovers	13
5	(Russia) Dmitri Kharine	Chelsea	11
5	(England) Steve Ogrizovic	Coventry City	11
5	(Netherlands) Hans Segers	Wimbledon	11
5	(Wales) Neville Southall	Everton	11
9	(England) Tony Coton	Manchester City	10
9	(Canada) Craig Forrest	Ipswich Town	10
9	(Scotland) Bryan Gunn	Norwich City	10

=== Discipline ===
==== Player ====
- Most yellow cards: 10
  - (England) Dane Whitehouse (Sheffield United)
- Most red cards: 2
  - (France) Eric Cantona (Manchester United)
  - (England) Chris Makin (Oldham Athletic)

==== Club ====
- Most yellow cards: 44
  - Sheffield United
- Fewest yellow cards: 12
  - Coventry City
- Most red cards: 4
  - Oldham Athletic
  - Sheffield United
- Fewest red cards: 0
  - Blackburn Rovers
  - Coventry City
  - Everton
  - Ipswich Town
  - Leeds United
  - Manchester City
  - Wimbledon

== Awards ==
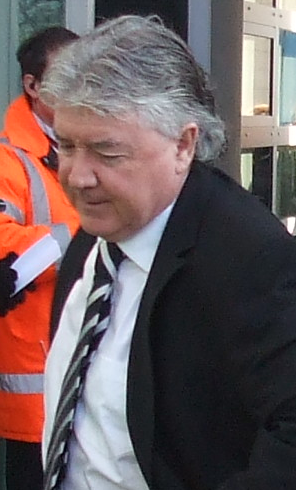
Joe Kinnear was Manager of the Month three times during the 1993–94 Premier League season.

=== Monthly awards ===
Month	Manager of the Month		References
Month	Manager	Club	References
August	(Scotland) Alex Ferguson	Manchester United	
September	(Republic of Ireland) Joe Kinnear	Wimbledon	
October	(Wales) Mike Walker	Norwich City	
November	(England) Kevin Keegan	Newcastle United	
December	(England) Trevor Francis	Sheffield Wednesday	
January	(Scotland) Kenny Dalglish	Blackburn Rovers	
February	(England) Joe Royle	Oldham Athletic	
March	(Republic of Ireland) Joe Kinnear	Wimbledon	
April	(Republic of Ireland) Joe Kinnear	Wimbledon	

=== Annual awards ===
PFA Team of the Year

Award	Winner	Club
Premier League Manager of the Season	(Scotland) Alex Ferguson	Manchester United
PFA Players' Player of the Year	(France) Eric Cantona	Manchester United
PFA Young Player of the Year	(England) Andy Cole	Newcastle United
FWA Footballer of the Year	(England) Alan Shearer	Blackburn Rovers

PFA Team of the Year
Goalkeeper	(England) Tim Flowers (Blackburn Rovers)			
Defenders	(Republic of Ireland) Gary Kelly (Leeds United)	(England) Gary Pallister (Manchester United)	(England) Tony Adams (Arsenal)	(Republic of Ireland) Denis Irwin (Manchester United)
Midfielders	(England) Paul Ince (Manchester United)		(Scotland) Gary McAllister (Leeds United)	(England) David Batty (Blackburn Rovers)
Forwards	(England) Alan Shearer (Blackburn Rovers)		(France) Eric Cantona (Manchester United)	(England) Peter Beardsley (Newcastle United)

== Attendances ==
Manchester United drew the highest average home attendance in the second edition of the Premier League.

#	Football club	Home games	Average attendance
1	Manchester United	21	44,244
2	Liverpool FC	21	38,503
3	Leeds United	21	34,495
4	Newcastle United	21	33,689
5	Arsenal FC	21	30,564
6	Aston Villa	21	29,015
7	Sheffield Wednesday	21	27,191
8	Tottenham Hotspur	21	27,160
9	Manchester City	21	26,709
10	Everton FC	21	22,868
11	West Ham United	21	20,593
12	Sheffield United	21	19,564
13	Chelsea FC	21	19,416
14	Norwich City	21	18,164
15	Blackburn Rovers	21	17,690
16	Ipswich Town	21	16,379
17	Swindon Town	21	15,248
18	Southampton FC	21	14,751
19	Queens Park Rangers	21	14,228
20	Coventry City	21	13,353
21	Oldham Athletic	21	12,477
22	Wimbledon FC	21	10,474

== See also ==
- 1993–94 in English football
