= Kevin Lock =

English footballer

Personal information
- Full name: Kevin Joseph Lock
- Date of birth: 27 December 1953 (age 72)
- Place of birth: Plaistow, England
- Height: 6 ft 0 in (1.83 m)
- Positions: Central defender; midfielder

Senior career*
Years	Team	Apps	(Gls)
1971–1978	West Ham United	132	(2)
1978–1985	Fulham	210	(27)
1985–1986	Southend United	10	(0)
Total		362	(29)

International career
1971–1972	England Youth	9	(0)
1973–1976	England U23	4	(0)

Managerial career
- 1997: Brentford (caretaker)
- * Club domestic league appearances and goals

Kevin Lock (born 27 December 1953) is an English former professional footballer who played as a central defender in the Football League, most notably for Fulham and West Ham United.

== Club career ==
Lock was born in Plaistow, Essex. He began his career with First Division club West Ham United as a ground staff boy in 1969. He made his debut against Sheffield United on 29 February 1972. After the departure of Bobby Moore in 1974, he broke into the team and was given Moore's number 6 shirt. Lock was a part of the team which emerged victorious in the 1975 FA Cup Final and had made 165 appearances and scored two goals by the time he departed Upton Park in May 1978. He dropped down to the Second Division to join Fulham for a £60,000 fee and made 233 appearances and scored 27 goals in seven seasons at Craven Cottage. Lock ended his career with Fourth Division club Southend United, after being signed by manager Bobby Moore on a free transfer. He made 11 appearances for the club, alongside another former Hammer, Frank Lampard.

== International career ==
Lock was capped by England at Youth and U23 level and was part of the 1971 and 1972 UEFA International Youth Tournament-winning squads. He was named in the senior squad for a Euro 1976 qualifier versus Portugal on 19 November 1975, but remained an unused substitute during the 1–1 draw.

== Coaching career ==
Lock began his coaching career in the Southend United youth system and remained with the club after the appointment of David Webb as manager in 1986. He followed Webb to Chelsea as first team coach in 1993 and then to Brentford later that year. Lock served the Bees as caretaker manager during the 1997–98 pre-season and managed the team to a 3–0 defeat versus Millwall on the opening day of the regular season. After the appointment of Eddie May as manager, he moved to the role of Football Coordinator and departed Griffin Park in May 1998. It was his final job in football.

== Personal life ==
On Saturday 21 February 1981, Lock was the best man at Fulham teammate Tony Mahoney's wedding in Grays and the pair played for Fulham later that day. After leaving football in 1998, Lock entered the pub trade.

== Career statistics ==
Appearances and goals by club, season and competition
Club	Season	League			FA Cup		League Cup		Europe		Other		Total	
Club	Season	Division	Apps	Goals	Apps	Goals	Apps	Goals	Apps	Goals	Apps	Goals	Apps	Goals
West Ham United	1971–72	First Division	3	0	0	0	0	0	—		—		3	0
West Ham United	1972–73	First Division	18	1	1	0	0	0	—		—		19	1
West Ham United	1973–74	First Division	11	0	0	0	2	0	—		1 (Note: Appearance in Watney Cup)	0	14	0
West Ham United	1974–75	First Division	42	0	8	0	3	0	—		—		53	0
West Ham United	1975–76	First Division	26	0	1	0	5	0	4 (Note: Appearances in UEFA Cup Winners' Cup)	0	3 (Note: 2 appearances in Anglo-Italian Cup, 1 appearance in FA Charity Shield)	0	39	0
West Ham United	1976–77	First Division	26	0	2	0	2	0	—		—		30	0
West Ham United	1977–78	First Division	6	1	2	0	2	0	—		—		10	1
West Ham United	Total		132	2	12	0	13	0	4	0	4	0	165	2
Fulham	1978–79	Second Division	39	3	3	0	2	0	—		—		44	3
Fulham	1979–80	Second Division	38	5	0	0	2	0	—		—		40	5
Fulham	1980–81	Third Division	29	5	6	0	1	0	—		—		36	5
Fulham	1981–82	Third Division	25	5	0	0	0	0	—		—		25	5
Fulham	1982–83	Second Division	34	2	0	0	3	0	—		—		37	2
Fulham	1983–84	Second Division	15	2	0	0	3	0	—		—		18	2
Fulham	1984–85	Second Division	30	5	1	0	2	0	—		—		33	5
Fulham	Total		210	27	10	0	13	0	—		—		233	27
Southend United	1985–86	Fourth Division	10	0	0	0	0	0	—		1 (Note: Appearance in Football League Trophy)	0	11	0
Career total			352	29	22	0	26	0	4	0	5	0	409	29

== Managerial statistics ==
Managerial record by team and tenure
Team	From	To	Record					Ref
Team	From	To	P	W	D	L	Win %	Ref
Brentford (caretaker)	5 August 1997	12 August 1997	1	0	0	1	0.0	
Total			1	0	0	1	0.0	—

== Honours ==
West Ham United

- FA Cup: 1974–75

Fulham

- Football League Third Division third-place promotion: 1981–82

England Youth

- UEFA International Youth Tournament: 1971, 1972
