= Len Cearns =

- Born: 1 March 1914; Romford, England
- Died: 28 October 1993 (aged 79)
- Occupation(s): Chairman, West Ham United
- Parent: W.J. Cearns /

Leonard Crittenden Cearns (1 March 1914 - 28 October 1993) was a chairman of English football club West Ham United.

Cearns was a member of a family which had been associated with West Ham since its 1900 foundation. J.W.Y Cearns was a founding member and director of the club until 1934. His son, W.J. Cearns, Len's father, was chairman from 1935 until 1950. Known as "Mr. Len" and "the father of West Ham", Cearns ran a construction company, joining the West Ham board in 1948 and taking the chairmanship in 1979 from Reg Pratt.

During the 1980s future chairmen David Sullivan and David Gold bought shares in the club to the value of £2m. Eager to keep control of the club with the Cearns and Pratt families, their further involvement was resisted by Cearns and the pair sold-up and later bought into Birmingham City. He was chairman until 1990 when he handed the role over to his son Martin. The last years of his time as chairman in 1989 and 1990 saw him sack West Ham's long-term manager John Lyall, after 34 years of service, and the recruitment of new manager Lou Macari in 1989 and successor, Billy Bonds in 1990. He continued as a director after relinquishing the chairmanship of West Ham, until his death in 1993.

Cearns served on the committees of the Football League, the Football Association and the Football Combination. He was also life vice-president of the Football League. He died 28 October 1993, a director of West Ham United for 45 years.
