= Vítor Pereira (footballer, born 1953) =

Portuguese footballer

Personal information
- Full name: Vítor Manuel Pereira
- Date of birth: 18 January 1953 (age 73)
- Place of birth: Barreiro, Portugal
- Position: Midfielder

Youth career
- 1967–1970: CUF

Senior career*
Years	Team	Apps	(Gls)
1970–1976	CUF	112	(0)
1976–1979	Boavista	35	(1)
1979–1980	Espinho	16	(0)
1980–1981	Sanjoanense	4	(0)
1981–1983	Quimigal	14	(0)
Total		181	(1)

International career
1974–1975	Portugal	2	(0)
- * Club domestic league appearances and goals

Vítor Manuel Pereira (born 18 January 1953 in Barreiro, Setúbal District) is a Portuguese former footballer who played as a midfielder.
