= Gregório Freixo =

Portuguese footballer

Personal information
- Full name: Gregório Francisco Penteado Freixo
- Date of birth: 8 September 1952 (age 74)
- Place of birth: Évora, Portugal
- Height: 1.75 m (5 ft 9 in)
- Position: Full-back

Senior career*
Years	Team	Apps	(Gls)
1971–1979	Académica	169	(12)
1979–1986	Vitória Guimarães	170	(16)
1986–1987	Marítimo	30	(2)
1987–1988	Covilhã	29	(1)
1988	Luso	1	(0)
Total		399	(31)

International career
1980–1983	Portugal	4	(0)

Managerial career
- 1988–1989: Luso
- 1998: Académica
- 1999: Académica
- 2009–2010: Esperança Coimbra
- * Club domestic league appearances and goals

Gregório Francisco Penteado Freixo (born 8 September 1952 in Évora) is a Portuguese former football full-back (right or left) and manager.
