= Alan Wooler =

English footballer (1953–2022)

Personal information
- Full name: Alan Thomas Wooler
- Date of birth: 17 August 1953
- Place of birth: Poole, Dorset, England
- Date of death: 29 March 2022 (aged 68)
- Height: 1.88 m (6 ft 2 in)
- Position: Defender

Youth career
- Manchester United
- Alton Town

Senior career*
Years	Team	Apps	(Gls)
–1971	Weymouth		
1971–1973	Reading	38	(0)
1973–1976	West Ham United	4	(0)
1974	→ Boston Minutemen (loan)	20	(0)
1975	→ Boston Minutemen (loan)	22	(2)
1976	→ Boston Minutemen (loan)	24	(0)
1976–1984	Aldershot	266	(3)
1977	→ HJK Helsinki (loan)	10	(0)
1979	→ HJK Helsinki (loan)	7	(0)
1980	→ HJK Helsinki (loan)	13	(4)
1981	→ HJK Helsinki (loan)	12	(2)
1982	→ Finnairin Palloilijat (loan)	24	
1983	→ Finnairin Palloilijat (loan)	29	(4)
1984	→ Finnairin Palloilijat (loan)	22	(2)
1985	→ Finnairin Palloilijat (loan)	21	(3)
1985–1986	Leatherhead		
1985–1989	Farnborough Town	18	(0)
1986	→ Malmin Palloseura (loan)		(4)
1987	→ Malmin Palloseura (loan)		(3)
1988	→ Malmin Palloseura (loan)		(8)
1989	→ Malmin Palloseura (loan)		(2)

Managerial career
- Millwall Ladies
- * Club domestic league appearances and goals

Alan Wooler (17 August 1953 – 29 March 2022) was an English footballer who played as a defender in England for Weymouth, Reading, West Ham United, Aldershot, Leatherhead and Farnborough Town. He also played in Finland for Malmin Palloseura, Finnairin Palloilijat and HJK Helsinki and in the US in the NASL for the Boston Minutemen. He was manager for the Millwall affiliate ladies team the Millwall Lionesses.

== Club career ==
An associate schoolboy player with Manchester United, Wooler played for Alton Town and Weymouth as an amateur in the Southern League.

=== Reading ===
Wooler signed for Reading in 1971 making his debut in December 1971.

=== West Ham United ===
Making 38 appearances for Reading Wooler moved on a free transfer to West Ham United in 1973 making his debut on 22 December 1973, as a substitute for Johnny Ayris, in a 2–0 home defeat to Stoke City. His next appearance came as a replacement for Bobby Moore in the FA Cup third round replay against Hereford United in January 1974. In a giant-killing, after a 1–1 draw at Upton Park, Hereford, recently elected to the Football League, beat First Division West Ham 2–1 at Edgar Street. In contrast, his third game came three days later as West Ham beat Manchester United 2–1 at Upton Park. Between 1974 and 1976 loan periods were arranged with Wooler playing for Boston Minutemen in the NASL.

=== Aldershot ===
Wooler made only two more appearances for West Ham before moving to Aldershot in 1976. Playing for eight seasons with Aldershot and on one occasion going two-and-a-half seasons without missing a first team game, Wooler played 305 games, in all competitions, scoring three goals; a total which puts him in 13th place in the Aldershot all-time appearance list.

=== Non-league and loans ===
From 1985 until 1989 Wooler moved into non-league football with Leatherhead and Farnborough Town. Between 1977 and 1989 Wooler regularly spent his summers playing for Finnish sides and turned-out for Malmin Palloseura, Finnairin Palloilijat and HJK Helsinki.

== Managerial career ==
Wooler was manager of Millwall Ladies team.

== Death ==
Wooler died in March 2022, aged 68 after being diagnosed with Myeloma.
