= Billy Bonds =

English footballer (1946–2025)

Billy Bonds MBE
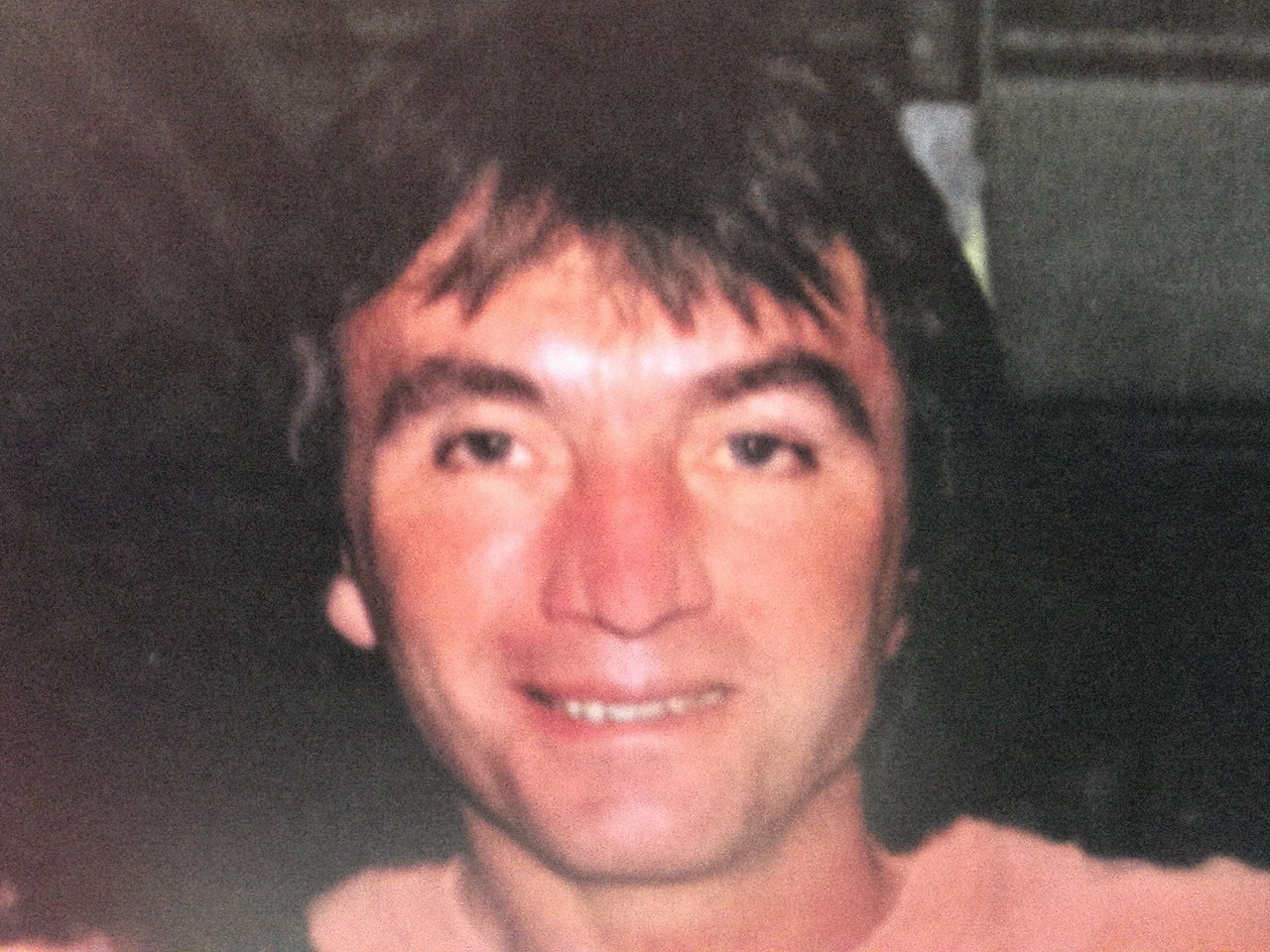
- Bonds in 1992

Personal information
- Full name: William Arthur Bonds
- Date of birth: 17 September 1946
- Place of birth: Woolwich, London, England
- Date of death: 30 November 2025 (aged 79)
- Height: 6 ft 0 in (1.83 m)
- Positions: Defender; midfielder

Youth career
- Charlton Athletic

Senior career*
Years	Team	Apps	(Gls)
1964–1967	Charlton Athletic	95	(1)
1967–1988	West Ham United	663	(48)
Total		758	(49)

Managerial career
- 1990–1994: West Ham United
- 1997–1998: Millwall
- * Club domestic league appearances and goals

William Arthur Bonds MBE (17 September 1946 – 30 November 2025) was an English professional footballer and manager, who was most often associated with West Ham United with whom he spent 27 years as player and manager. He played 799 first-team games for West Ham in a career spanning 21 seasons, winning two FA Cups with them. He died peacefully on 30 November 2025 whilst sleeping.

== Background ==
Born in Woolwich, south-east London, Bonds grew up in nearby Eltham, where he played for a Sunday boys' team, Moatbridge, and Kent Schoolboys and joined the groundstaff at Charlton Athletic after leaving school at 15. He played in the youth and A team and occasionally in the reserves before joining the playing staff shortly before his 18th birthday in September 1964.

== Club career ==
Bonds made his League debut for Charlton against Northampton Town in February 1965 and became a regular in the first team, going on to make 95 League appearances, scoring one goal, before being signed by Ron Greenwood for West Ham United for a fee of £50,000 in May 1967. He made his first appearance for West Ham in a testimonial match for Ken Brown in the same month and made his League debut against Sheffield Wednesday in the opening game of the 1967–68 season. He was ever-present in the 1968–69 and 1969–70 seasons and played 124 consecutive league games until injury ended his run of appearances in October 1970.

Bonds played his first three seasons as a right-back before Greenwood switched him to midfield in the 1970–71 season where he counterbalanced the skills of Trevor Brooking. Bonds was at his peak in the early 1970s, helping West Ham to the semi-final of the Football League Cup in the 1971–72 season, where they lost to Stoke City after a second replay, and topping the scorers list at West Ham in the 1973–74 season with 13 goals, including a hat-trick against Chelsea. After the departure of Bobby Moore in March 1974, Bonds was appointed to the captaincy and led the club to an FA Cup final victory over Fulham, for whom Bobby Moore was playing, in 1975 and to the final of the 1976 European Cup Winners' Cup despite a groin injury that interrupted the latter half of the 1974–75 season and part of the 1975–76 season. Greenwood moved Bonds from midfield to the back four as centre-half alongside Tommy Taylor shortly before the end of the 1976–77 season, where he was able to come out from defence with the ball.

Bonds experienced relegation with West Ham at the end of the 1977–78 season but led West Ham to a second FA Cup victory over First Division club Arsenal in 1980, becoming the only West Ham captain to lift the FA Cup on two occasions. In 1980–81, he led West Ham to the final of the League Cup, which was lost to Liverpool after a replay, and to promotion back to the First Division.

Bonds passed Bobby Moore's club record of appearances in 1982–83 and 'officially' retired in May 1984, relinquishing the captaincy to Alvin Martin. A spate of injuries to first-team players saw him return to the squad and make 26 league and cup appearances in 1984–85. He missed the entire 1985–86 season due to a toe injury but, having passed his 40th birthday, he was able to re-establish himself in the first-team during the 1986–87 season. A knee injury that forced him out of the last two games of the 1987–88 season led to a decision to finally retire in the summer of 1988, having played his last game at Southampton in April 1988 at the age of 41 years and 226 days.

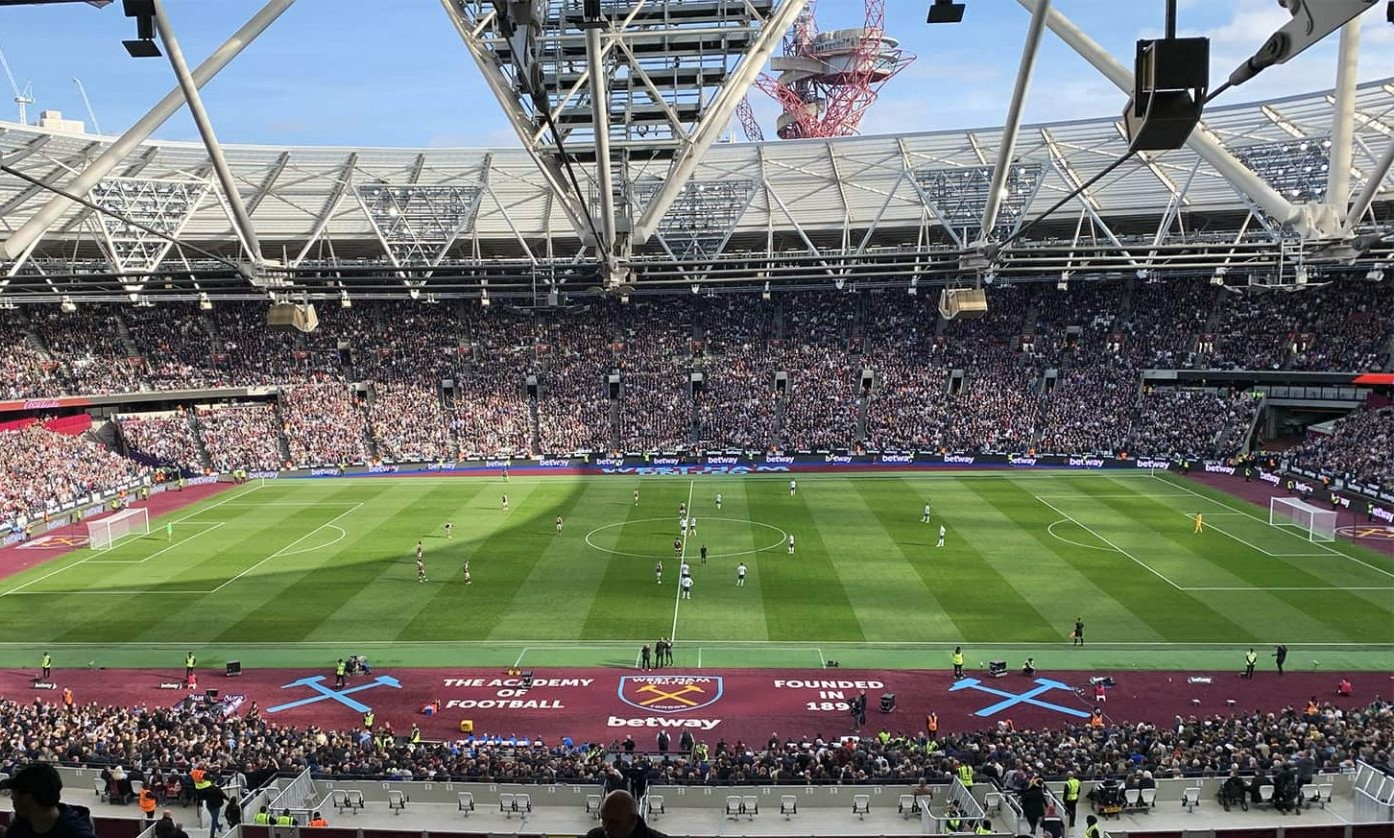
Billy Bonds stand at the London Stadium.

Bonds had remained at the club as a player for over 20 years, scoring 48 goals in a club record 663 League appearances. He established himself as a local hero and was the supporters' choice for 'Hammer of the Year' in 1971, 1974, 1975 and 1987. He was appointed Member of the Order of the British Empire (MBE) in January 1988 and was presented with the PFA Merit Award in April 1988 by his fellow professional players. In May 2013 Bonds was awarded West Ham United's first ever lifetime achievement award.

On 6 February 2019, it was announced that the East Stand at London Stadium would be renamed the Billy Bonds Stand. The unveiling took place ahead of West Ham's home fixture against Newcastle United on 2 March.

== International career ==
Bonds was capped twice at England Under-23 international level and was on the bench as a non-playing substitute for the senior international team for a World Cup qualifying match against Italy in November 1977. A collision with goalkeeper Phil Parkes in the last game of the 1980–1981 season broke two of Bonds' ribs, and ruled him out of selection for England against Brazil in May 1981. Bonds and Alvin Martin were in line to make their England debuts in that game.

== Managerial career ==
After Bonds retired as a player in 1988, West Ham manager John Lyall appointed him as youth coach. He unsuccessfully applied for the manager's post when Lyall left the club in July 1989 after West Ham had been relegated. However, when new manager Lou Macari resigned seven months later, Bonds was appointed manager in February 1990. In his first full season in charge, he took the club to promotion, when they finished as runners-up to Oldham Athletic in the 1990-91 season, also reaching the semi-finals of the FA Cup where they lost to Nottingham Forest. He was awarded a second testimonial in the same season.

West Ham were relegated in the 1991–92 season in bottom place, but the board kept faith in Bonds and he led them to promotion the following season, when they finished as runners-up to Newcastle United. Bonds guided West Ham to a 13th-place finish in the 1993–94 Premier League. He resigned in August 1994, just before the new season began, when he was replaced by Harry Redknapp. He had spells in coaching at Queens Park Rangers and Reading before making a return to management with Millwall in May 1997. He managed 53 games before being sacked by the club the following year as they finished in the bottom half of Division Two.

== Death ==
Bonds died on the morning of 30 November 2025, at the age of 79, following a long illness.

== Career statistics ==
Appearances and goals by club, season and competition
Club	Season	League			FA Cup		League Cup		Other		Total	
Club	Season	Division	Apps	Goals	Apps	Goals	Apps	Goals	Apps	Goals	Apps	Goals
Charlton Athletic	1964–65	Second Division	13	0	0	0	0	0	0	0	13	0
Charlton Athletic	1965–66	Second Division	40	0	1	0	2	0	0	0	43	0
Charlton Athletic	1966–67	Second Division	42	1	1	0	1	0	0	0	44	1
Charlton Athletic	Total		95	1	2	0	3	0	0	0	100	1
West Ham United	1967–68	First Division	37	1	3	0	2	0	0	0	42	1
West Ham United	1968–69	First Division	42	1	3	0	2	0	0	0	47	1
West Ham United	1969–70	First Division	42	3	1	0	2	0	0	0	45	3
West Ham United	1970–71	First Division	37	0	1	0	2	0	0	0	40	0
West Ham United	1971–72	First Division	42	3	4	0	10	2	–		56	5
West Ham United	1972–73	First Division	39	3	2	0	2	0	–		43	3
West Ham United	1973–74	First Division	40	13	2	0	1	0	1 (Note: Appearance in Watney Cup)	0	44	13
West Ham United	1974–75	First Division	31	7	8	0	3	2	3	2	45	11
West Ham United	1975–76	First Division	18	1	0	0	5	1	10	2	33	4
West Ham United	1976–77	First Division	41	3	2	0	3	0	0	0	46	3
West Ham United	1977–78	First Division	29	1	3	1	0	0	0	0	32	2
West Ham United	1978–79	Second Division	39	4	1	0	1	0	0	0	41	4
West Ham United	1979–80	Second Division	34	1	5	0	9	0	0	0	48	1
West Ham United	1980–81	Second Division	41	0	3	0	8	1	7	1	59	2
West Ham United	1981–82	First Division	29	1	2	1	4	0	0	0	35	2
West Ham United	1982–83	First Division	34	3	1	0	4	0	0	0	39	3
West Ham United	1983–84	First Division	27	0	1	0	2	0	0	0	30	0
West Ham United	1984–85	First Division	22	3	0	0	4	0	0	0	26	3
West Ham United	1985–86	First Division	0	0	0	0	0	0	–		0	0
West Ham United	1986–87	First Division	17	0	4	0	3	0	–		24	0
West Ham United	1987–88	First Division	22	0	2	0	0	0	–		24	0
West Ham United	Total		663	48	48	2	67	6	21	5	799	61
Career total			758	49	50	2	70	6	21	5	899	62

== Honours ==
West Ham United

- Football League Second Division: 1980–81
- FA Cup: 1974–75, 1979–80
- Football League Cup runner-up: 1980–81
- European Cup Winners' Cup runner-up: 1975–76

== Sources ==
- Northcutt, J.; R. Shoesmith (1993). West Ham United: A Complete Record. Derby: Breedon Books. p. 110. ISBN 1-873626-44-4. OCLC: 30031590.
- Hayes, D. (1998). The Upton Park Encyclopedia: an a-z of West Ham United. Edinburgh: Mainstream. pp. 24–25. ISBN 1-84018-043-9. OCLC: 60220812.
- Cameron, C. (2003). Home and Away with Charlton Athletic 1920–2004. London: Voice of the Valley. pp. 211–224. ISBN 0-9518125-2-1.
- Hogg, T. (2005). Who's Who of West Ham United. London: Profile Sports Media. p. 30. ISBN 1-903135-50-8. OCLC: 61478468.
- McDonald, T. (2007). West Ham In My Day. Essex: Football World. pp. 103–113. ISBN 978-0-9551176-8-8.
- Northcutt, J. (2007). The Claret & Blue Book of West Ham United. Brighton: Pitch. pp. 16–17. ISBN 978-1-905411-02-3.
- "Millwall History". Millwall Football Club Official Site. 16 August 2007.
