= Martin Cearns =

Football club chairman (1945–2024)

- Born: April 1945
- Died: May 2024 (aged 79)
- Occupation(s): Chairman, West Ham United

Martin William Cearns (April 1945 – May 2024) was an English football executive who served as chairman of West Ham United.

== Life and career ==
Cearns was born in April 1945. A bank manager with Barclays Bank, Cearns became a board member with West Ham, succeeding his father, Len Cearns, as chairman in 1990. He held the position until 1992, when he was succeeded by Terry Brown. Although no longer chairman, Cearns remained on the board until 1 December 2006, when he resigned following the club sale to Icelandic billionaire, Björgólfur Guðmundsson for £85 million. As part of the takeover, he received £7.76 million from the sale of his 1,844,000 shares in West Ham.

Cearns' time at West Ham is remembered for his advocacy, alongside Peter Storrie, of the Hammers Bond scheme—a financial bond which West Ham fans would have been forced to buy before being allowed to purchase a season ticket. The proposal led to demonstrations both inside and outside West Ham's ground, and to pitch invasions.

West Ham announced Cearns' death on 7 May 2024, at the age of 79.
