= Pop Robson =

English footballer (born 1945)

Personal information
- Full name: Bryan Stanley Robson
- Date of birth: 11 November 1945 (age 80)
- Place of birth: Sunderland, County Durham, England
- Height: 5 ft 8 in (1.73 m)
- Position: Centre forward

Youth career
- Clara Vale

Senior career*
Years	Team	Apps	(Gls)
1962–1971	Newcastle United	206	(82)
1971–1974	West Ham United	120	(47)
1974–1976	Sunderland	90	(34)
1976–1979	West Ham United	107	(47)
1979–1981	Sunderland	52	(23)
1981–1982	Carlisle United	48	(21)
1982–1983	Chelsea	15	(3)
1982–1983	→ Carlisle United (loan)	11	(4)
1983–1984	Sunderland	12	(3)
1984–1985	Carlisle United	13	(1)
1985–1986	Gateshead	3	(1)
Total		677	(265)

International career
- England U23

Managerial career
- 1984: Sunderland (caretaker)
- 1985: Carlisle United
- * Club domestic league appearances and goals

Bryan Stanley Robson, better known as Pop Robson (born 11 November 1945) is an English former footballer who played as a centre-forward. He played for Newcastle United, West Ham United, Sunderland, Chelsea and Carlisle United, and scored 265 goals in 674 league games. He also earned one cap for England under-23s.

== Nickname ==
As a child Robson had two friends; and together the trio were known as Snap, Crackle and Pop.

== Playing career ==
=== Early career ===
Born in Sunderland, County Durham, Robson played for Clara Vale in his youth. His first senior club was Newcastle United, and whilst there he won the Second Division title in 1964–65 and the 1969 Fairs Cup, forming a productive partnership with Welshman Wyn Davies.

=== West Ham United and Sunderland ===
In February 1971 he became West Ham United's record purchase when he signed for £120,000. He scored on his debut against Nottingham Forest on 24 February 1971. He was West Ham's leading scorer in two of his three seasons at Upton Park.

He made a return to the North-East to join Sunderland in July 1974 for £145,000.

He rejoined West Ham in October 1976. During his two spells at West Ham, he made 254 appearances, scoring 104 goals. He returned to Roker Park in June 1979 for £45,000, and was to eventually play for Sunderland in three separate stints, his goals twice helping them to promotion, as Football League Second Division champions in 1976 and runners-up in 1980.

=== Carlisle and Chelsea ===
Robson was employed as a player/coach by Carlisle United and Chelsea, and at Sunderland during his third spell there. He even stepped in as caretaker manager for one game during the 1983–84 season before the arrival of Len Ashurst. In 1982 Carlisle managed promotion back to the Second Division with a young Peter Beardsley alongside Robson in attack.

=== Third spells at Sunderland and Carlisle United ===
Robson is remembered by the Sunderland fans for the rescue act on the last day of the 1983–84 season at Leicester City. Recalled to lead the front line at the age of 38 years and 182 days, he scored his last goal for Sunderland in a 2–0 win that saved the team from relegation. In his three stays at the club he amassed 174 appearances (10 from the bench) and 67 goals. He also managed the club as caretaker for a single game in 1984 following the sacking of Alan Durban.

He finished his Football League career with a third spell at Carlisle, and in total he made 674 Football League appearances and scored 265 goals. Robson briefly played for non-league Gateshead after leaving Carlisle, scoring one goal during his stint at the club in 1985–86.

== Personal life ==
Robson is married to the former England international table tennis player Maureen Heppell.

== Coaching career ==
After finishing playing with Carlisle he coached at Hartlepool United, Manchester United, Leeds United and finally Sunderland until May 2004. In July 2011, Robson joined his former club Sunderland as the new chief scout.
