= Will Cearns =

English football club chairman (1882–1950)

- Born: William John Cearns; 13 March 1882; West Ham, England
- Died: 19 February 1950 (aged 67); Wanstead, London
- Occupations: Chairman, West Ham United; Managing Director, Wimbledon Stadium

William John Cearns (1882 – 19 February 1950) was a chairman of English football club West Ham United and managing director of Wimbledon Stadium.

== Early life ==
Cearns worked at the famous market in Smithfield, London, aged 14 before studying book-keeping at the West Ham Technical Institute.

== Football ==
Cearns was a member of a family which had been associated with West Ham since its 1900 foundation. His father, James "Jimmy" William Y. Cearns, worked for the Thames Ironworks and Shipbuilding Company and was on the first committee when a works team was formed in 1895. He was then one of the inaugural directors when the team went professional and became West Ham United in 1900. He remained a director until he died in 1934. Will was chairman from 1935 until his death in 1950.

Known as "the Cockney millionaire", Cearns was involved in the construction industry and was responsible for the first underground car park in the country. He was also prominent in funding the construction of West Ham's Boleyn Ground, (building the main grandstand) and a swimming pool in Wanstead High School.

== Greyhound racing ==
Cearns was one of the most significant figures in the early history of greyhound racing. In 1928 the South London Greyhound Racecourses Ltd began construction on Wimbledon Stadium. However financial difficulties halted the project until a consortium headed by Cearns whose firm had been responsible for the construction of the stadium stepped in with sufficient funds to save the project. He was the managing director at Southend Stadium and became the managing director at Wimbledon Stadium until his death in 1950. His son John took over the position and became chairman of the Greyhound Racing Association.

Cearns' achievements were remembered with a race inaugurated in 1950 at Wimbledon called the WJ Cearns Memorial Invitation.
