= Mick McGiven =

English footballer

Personal information
- Full name: Michael McGiven
- Date of birth: 7 February 1951 (age 75)
- Place of birth: Newcastle upon Tyne, England
- Height: 6 ft 0 in (1.83 m)
- Position: Defender

Youth career
- –: Sunderland

Senior career*
Years	Team	Apps	(Gls)
1969–1974	Sunderland	113	(9)
1974–1978	West Ham United	48	(0)
Total		161	(9)
- * Club domestic league appearances and goals

Mick McGiven (born 7 February 1951 in Newcastle upon Tyne) is a former professional footballer who played as a defender in the Football League for Sunderland and West Ham United. After retiring as a player he joined the coaching staff at West Ham United, then worked with Chelsea's youth team and served as assistant manager of Ipswich Town under John Lyall from 1990, helping Ipswich win promotion to the new FA Premier League as Second Division champions in 1992.

For the 1993-94 season, McGiven was named as head coach of Ipswich, although Lyall was still officially the club's manager. Ipswich started the season reasonably well, a notable success coming towards the end of November, when they travelled to Old Trafford to face defending champions and eventual double winners Manchester United in the league, and held the hosts to a goalless draw. However, Ipswich picked up just three points from their final 11 league games and only narrowly avoided relegation. For the 1994-95 season, Lyall reverted to having control of the first team, with McGiven once again serving as Lyall's assistant, but by the end of 1994 Lyall had resigned and McGiven had followed suit, as Ipswich headed towards relegation.

McGiven later returned to Chelsea where he performed a variety of roles with the club, including working as a scout. He retired from Chelsea in October 2018.
