= Trevor Brooking =

English footballer

Sir Trevor Brooking CBE
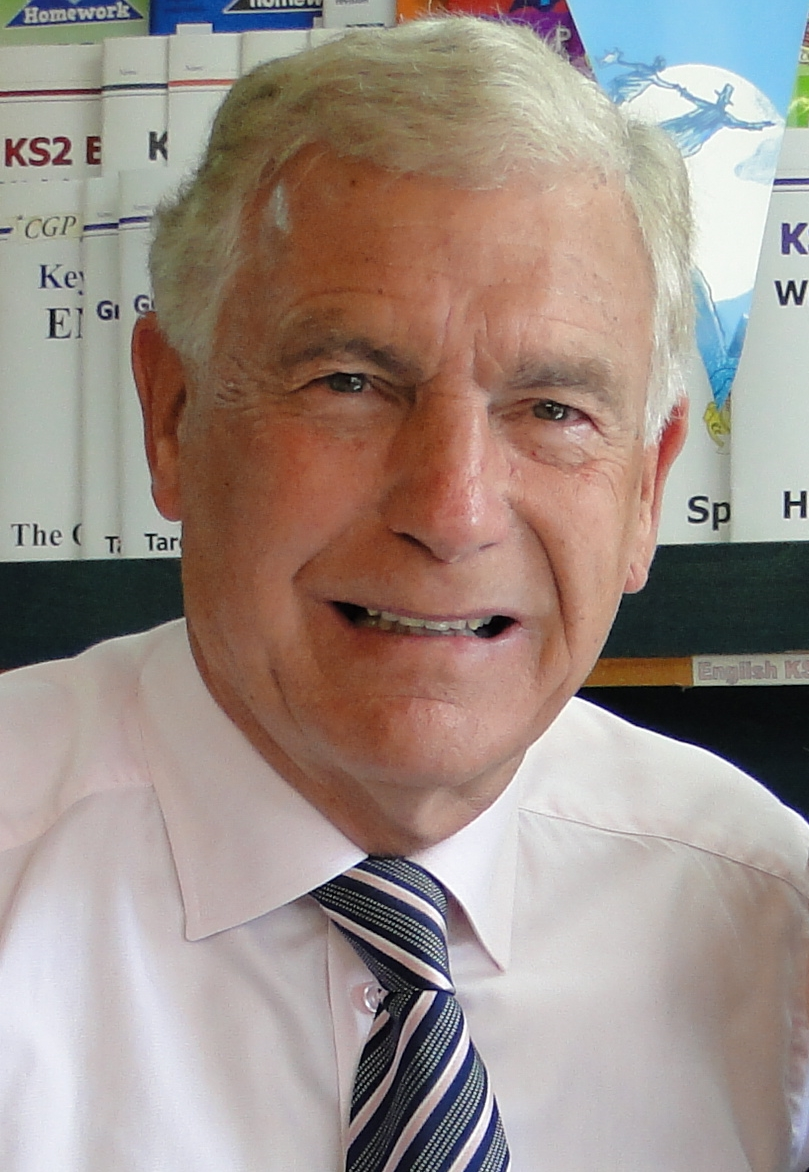
- Brooking at a book signing in 2014

Personal information
- Full name: Trevor David Brooking
- Date of birth: 2 October 1948 (age 78)
- Place of birth: Barking, Essex, England
- Height: 6 ft 0 in (1.84 m)
- Position: Midfielder

Youth career
- 1965–1966: West Ham United

Senior career*
Years	Team	Apps	(Gls)
1966–1984	West Ham United	528	(88)
1984	Manurewa	1	(0)
1985	Newcastle Blue Star	1	(0)
1985	Kelmscott	6	(0)
1985	Cork City	2	(0)
Total		538	(88)

International career
1964	England Schoolboys	1	(0)
1967	England Youth	6	(2)
1971	England U23	1	(1)
1974	The Football League XI	1	(1)
1974–1982	England	47	(5)

Managerial career
- 2003: West Ham United (caretaker)
- * Club domestic league appearances and goals

Sir Trevor David Brooking (born 2 October 1948) is a former England international footballer, manager, pundit and football administrator; he now works as director of football development in England.

Brooking spent almost his entire career at West Ham United, making 647 appearances for the club. He won the 1975 FA Cup and the 1980 FA Cup in which he scored the only goal. He was also the club's player of the season on four occasions and caretaker manager on two occasions in 2003. Brooking played 47 times for England, scoring five times. He was appointed a Member of the Order of the British Empire (MBE) in 1981, elevated to Commander of same order (CBE) in 1999, and knighted in 2004. In 2009, a stand at Upton Park was named after him. Since retiring from playing, he has taken up a number of positions in broadcasting as an on-air analyst and in football and sports administration.

== Club career ==
=== West Ham United ===
Trevor David Brooking was born on 2 October 1948 in Barking, Essex, to mother Margaret and father Henry Charles (known as Harry), who was a police officer in the Metropolitan Police. Brooking attended Ripple Infants School and left Ilford County High School with 11 O-levels and 2 A-levels. His father took him to see his first West Ham United game at Upton Park, a 1–1 draw against Liverpool on 19 April 1958, when he was nine years old. Aged fifteen he trained at both Tottenham and Chelsea. However, West Ham manager Ron Greenwood watched him with scout Wally St Pier, and Brooking was offered apprenticeships by all three clubs, with only West Ham allowing him to stay on at school to finish his studies. Despite his parents being offered £500 and a car by manager Tommy Docherty to gain his signature for Chelsea he remained at school signing an apprenticeship deal with West Ham on 24 July 1965, his parents receiving no fee.

In June 1967, Brooking made his senior debut in a friendly for West Ham against Grasshopper Zürich in Switzerland. His league debut came in place of wide-right Brian Dear on 29 August 1967 in a 3–3 draw with Burnley at Turf Moor. His first goal came on 26 December 1967 in a 4–2 away win at Leicester City. His first season saw him play 28 games, scoring nine goals. His second season saw 37 appearances and eight goals. His only hat-trick came on 6 April 1968 in a 5–0 home defeat of Newcastle.

In December 1969, during his third season, Brooking chipped a bone in his ankle in a game against Nottingham Forest. The club signed Peter Eustace for £90,000 to take his place; his recovery took longer than expected, and he considered giving up the game. However, he returned to playing and with the departure of Martin Peters to Tottenham in March 1970, Brooking became a regular in midfield. His place in the side came under threat in the 1971–72 season with the purchase of midfielder Tommy Taylor, and Brooking was transfer-listed at his request. However, the failure of the defensive partnership between Bobby Moore and Alan Stephenson saw Stephenson dropped and Taylor being moved into defence; Brooking remained an ever-present for the rest of the season and was voted Hammer of the Year.

During the 1972–73 season, Brooking came to the attention of Derby County manager Brian Clough, who offered West Ham £400,000 for Brooking and Moore. However, Greenwood refused to let the pair leave. Again, in 1974 Tottenham manager Bill Nicholson offered £425,000 for the signature of Brooking. According to Brooking in his autobiography, this move was not pursued as he felt Nicholson, a manager he admired, was coming to the end of his Tottenham career and was unsure which manager would follow him.

He won the FA Cup twice, in 1975 with Brooking scoring a vital goal in a 2–1 win in a fourth round replay away at Swindon Town and 1980; in the latter, he scored another vital goal in a 2–1 win in a third round replay against West Bromwich Albion and the only goal in a 1–0 win over Arsenal in the final with a header. Brooking scored what was considered goal of the year in the Golden Goals Competition on ITV, according to the panel (Dave Sexton, Pat Jennings, Vic Railton and Bernard Joy) for the 1976 British League season.

Brooking was a member of the West Ham team which won the Second Division in 1981. He also appeared in the 1975 FA Charity Shield, the 1976 European Cup Winners' Cup Final, the 1980 FA Charity Shield and the 1981 Football League Cup Final. His last game for West Ham came on 18 May 1984 in 1–0 home defeat by Everton. In total he made 647 appearances and scoring 102 times, wearing the number 10 jersey, his total appearances for West Ham beaten only by Billy Bonds, Bobby Moore and Frank Lampard Sr. He had a testimonial match against an England XI in October 1977.

=== Later career ===
During the 1984 New Zealand National Soccer League season, Brooking made a single appearance for Manurewa, playing in a 2–2 draw against Auckland University.

Brooking accepted an invitation to play for Blue Star in a Wearside League game against Coundon on 28 April 1985. Blue Star had paid for him to fly to Newcastle as their guest and reportedly paid him an appearance fee of £500.

In 1985, Brooking played six times for Western Australian club Kelmscott, also helping to coach the club's youth sides.

Later that year, Brooking played briefly for Cork City, making two appearances.

== International career ==
Brooking made his England debut on 3 April 1974 in a 0–0 draw against Portugal. He played 47 times, scoring five goals but only appeared twice in major tournaments. At Euro 1980 in Italy he played in England's opening game against Belgium which was a 1–1 draw, but was dropped for the second game, against Italy which England lost 1–0. Re-instated to the starting eleven against Spain he scored England's first goal in a 2–1 win. Due to injury World Cup 1982 was to see him limited to playing as a substitute against Spain on 5 July 1982. Playing for only the last half-hour of the game, Brooking forced one excellent save from the Spanish goalkeeper, Luis Arconada, but with England needing to win to qualify for the semi-final a 0–0 draw saw them eliminated. This was to be his final international appearance.

== Style of play ==
Brooking was primarily right-footed, but was comfortable on his left foot, due to repeated practice. He played as an attacking midfield player, known for his controlled passing and midfield authority. Early in his career he was vulnerable to being out-muscled by opposition players (leading his teammates to nickname him 'Cyril' after Cyril Lord the carpet salesman, as Ron Greenwood told him "you're always on the floor"). He lacked pace, leading to another nickname, Boog, after a slow baseball player called Boog Powell the team had witnessed during a tour of the US. He was rarely booked or sent off during his West Ham career and due to his gentlemanly approach to the game where he rarely contested a referee's decision he picked up another nickname, Hadleigh, after a television upper class and urbane detective played by Gerald Harper.

== Managerial career ==
In April 2003, after West Ham manager Glenn Roeder collapsed due to a brain tumour, Brooking, having long been on the board at West Ham, briefly took over as caretaker manager. The club were fighting relegation from the Premier League. Brooking took charge of three games. His first game resulted in a 1–0 win at Manchester City with a goal from Frédéric Kanouté. His second saw West Ham beat Chelsea 1–0, with a goal from Paolo Di Canio. The final game of the season saw West Ham draw 2–2 at Birmingham City resulting in relegation, albeit with 42 points, a record number for a relegated team in a 38-game season.

After the first three games of the 2003–04 season with West Ham now in the First Division, Roeder was sacked after West Ham suffered an away defeat to Rotherham United and Brooking was again installed as caretaker manager. He managed for eleven games, losing only once, to Gillingham, a 2–0 away defeat in which Jermain Defoe was sent off. In October 2003 he was replaced by Alan Pardew, who was appointed on his recommendation.

== Media career ==
In 1984, Brooking joined the BBC as a pundit, and has featured on radio and television commentary since, including the BBC's Match of the Day and coverage of World Cups and European Championships. He was also the co-commentator in the Pro Evolution Soccer video game series, alongside Peter Brackley until Pro Evolution Soccer 6.

== Football administration ==
Brooking was chair of the Eastern Region Council for Sport and Recreation from 1987 until 1997, and between 1999 and 2002 he was chairman of Sport England. In January 2004, he joined the Football Association as Director of Football Development, a role which gave him control of coaching and development in English football, as well as a role in appointing future England managers.

Brooking was a key part of the selection process for the successor of Sven-Göran Eriksson, revealed in May 2006 to be Steve McClaren. In 2004, he was knighted for his services to sport.

== Personal life ==
Brooking says he has an "aversion to alcohol," having "discovered in early life that it wasn't for me."

In June 1970, he married Hilkka, a Finnish au pair. The couple had two children: Collette and Warren. Hilkka, Lady Brooking died in June 2025.

In 1970, along with schoolfriend Colin McGowan, Brooking started a book binding company, Colbrook Plastics Limited in Stratford, East London. He was awarded an honorary doctorate from the University of Essex in 2001. In October 2014, his autobiography, Trevor Brooking, My Life in Football, was published.

== Legacy ==
=== Sir Trevor Brooking Stand ===
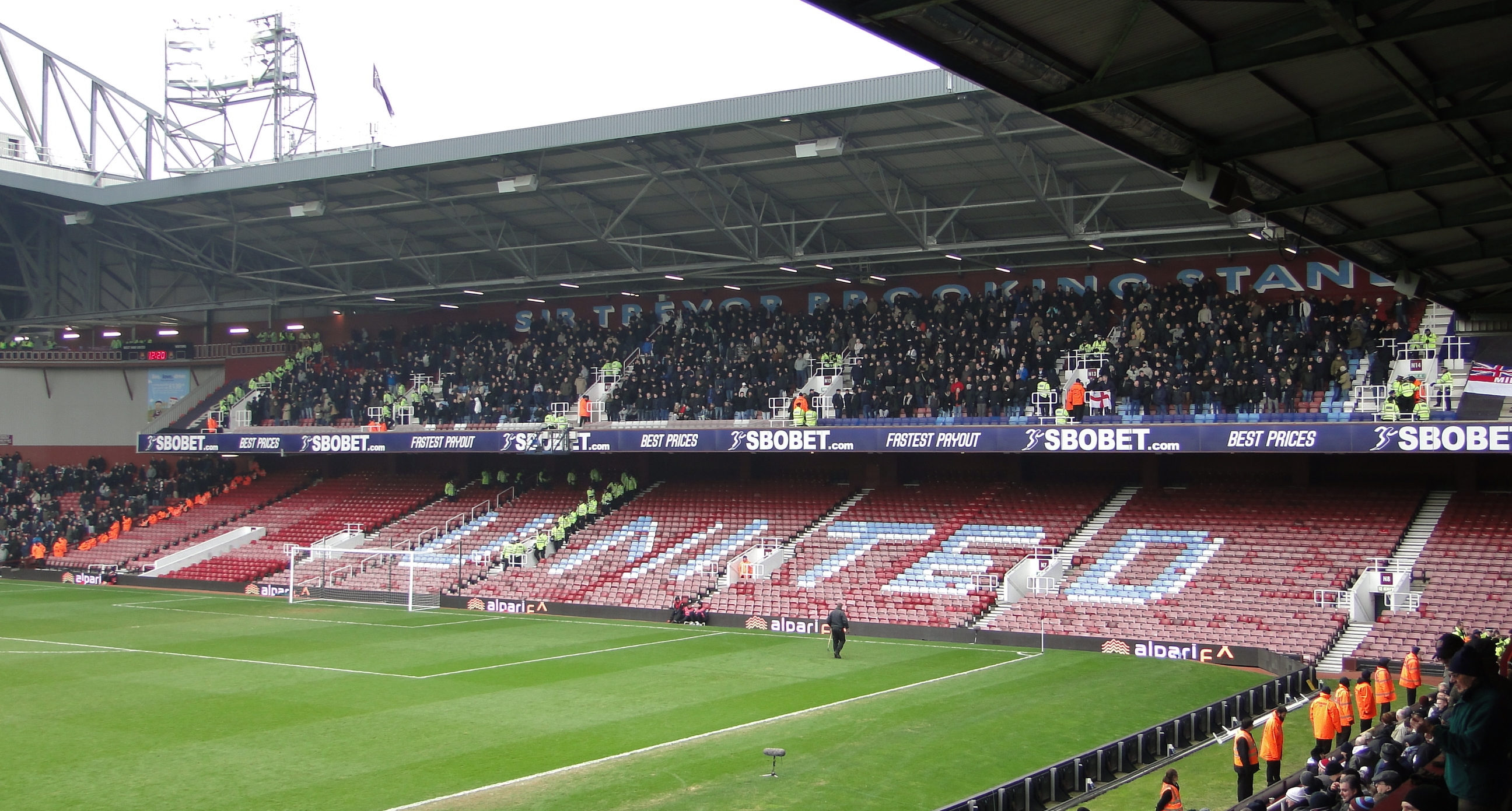
Millwall fans segregated in the upper tier of Boleyn Ground's Sir Trevor Brooking Stand

In 2009 West Ham United announced that from 8 August, the start of the 2009–10 season, 'The Centenary Stand' at Boleyn Ground would be named 'The Sir Trevor Brooking Stand' in his honour. The stand was used by away supporters and had been the scene for crowd disturbances. In 2009 in a match between West Ham and Millwall seats were torn out by Millwall fans and hurled towards West Ham fans. In subsequent seasons, Millwall fans were segregated to the upper tier of the stand and kept at least 30 yards from West Ham fans to prevent crowd disturbances.

A stand at the London Stadium is also named after Brooking and used by West Ham after their move from the Boleyn Ground from the start of the 2016–17 season.

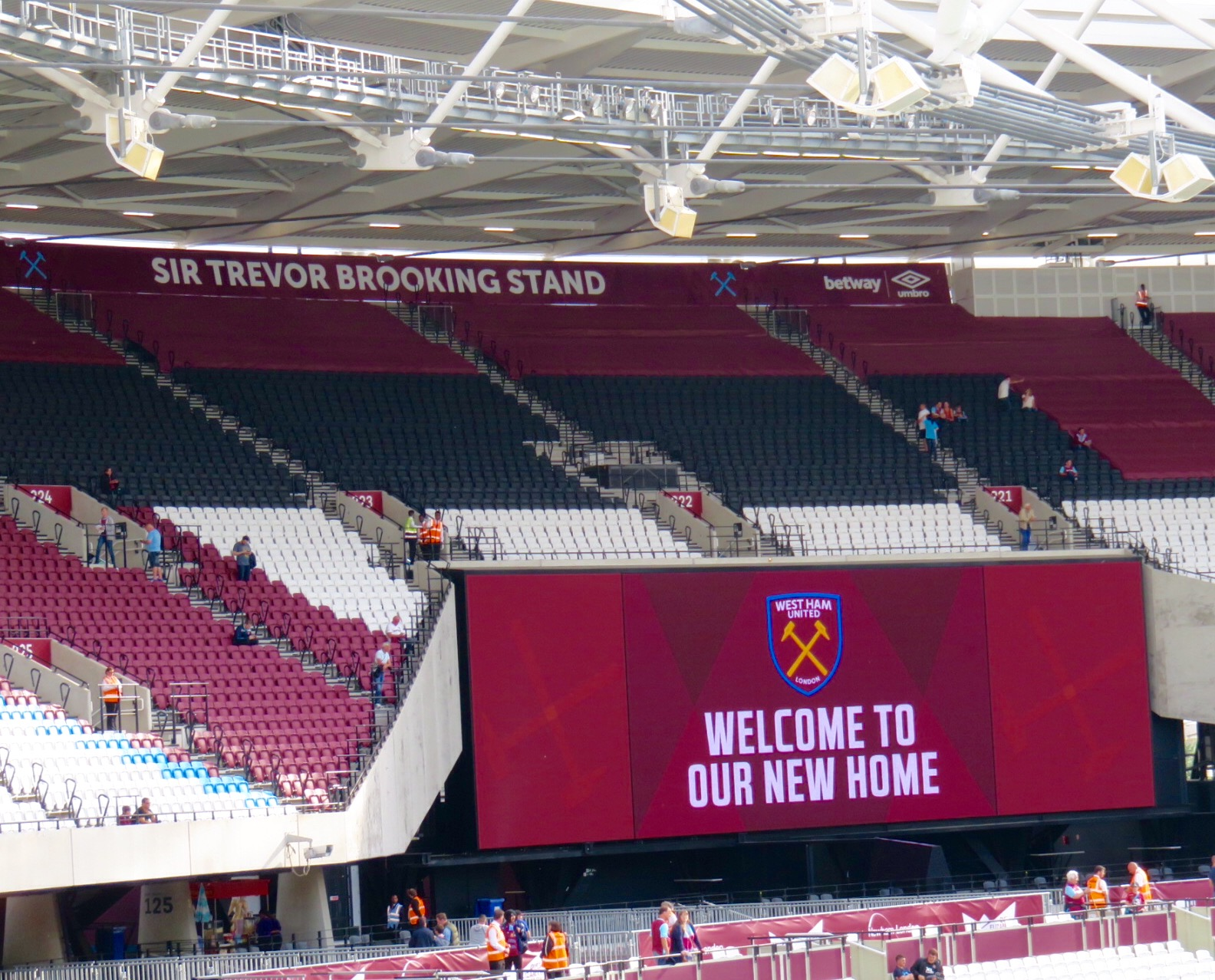
The Sir Trevor Brooking Stand at the London Stadium

It is obviously a terrific honour (to have the stand named after me), which I am very grateful for because this is my club. It will be my club forever. The great thing was being able to spend my whole career with West Ham, having a stint as caretaker manager and as a director. I still try and get to most of the home games. On my travels, if I am in a cab or something then everyone talks to me about West Ham because they know I am associated with the club. It is something I am only too pleased about whenever it happens. We have a very passionate and loyal support

— Sir Trevor Brooking speaking to whufc.com

== Career statistics ==
=== Club ===
Appearances and goals by club, season and competition
Club	Season	Division	League		FA Cup		League Cup		Other		Total	
Club	Season	Division	Apps	Goals	Apps	Goals	Apps	Goals	Apps	Goals	Apps	Goals
West Ham United	1967–68	First Division	25	9	3	0	0	0	0	0	28	9
West Ham United	1968–69	First Division	32	7	2	0	3	1	0	0	37	8
West Ham United	1969–70	First Division	21	4	0	0	2	0	0	0	23	4
West Ham United	1970–71	First Division	19	2	0	0	1	0	0	0	20	2
West Ham United	1971–72	First Division	40	6	4	0	10	1	0	0	54	7
West Ham United	1972–73	First Division	40	11	2	0	2	0	0	0	44	11
West Ham United	1973–74	First Division	38	6	0	0	2	0	1	0	41	6
West Ham United	1974–75	First Division	36	3	8	1	3	1	3	0	50	5
West Ham United	1975–76	First Division	34	5	1	0	4	1	10	3	49	9
West Ham United	1976–77	First Division	42	4	2	0	3	0	0	0	47	4
West Ham United	1977–78	First Division	37	4	2	0	0	0	0	0	39	4
West Ham United	1978–79	Second Division	21	2	1	0	0	0	0	0	22	2
West Ham United	1979–80	Second Division	37	3	7	2	8	1	2	0	54	6
West Ham United	1980–81	Second Division	36	10	3	0	7	0	6	0	52	10
West Ham United	1981–82	First Division	34	8	2	0	5	1	2	0	43	9
West Ham United	1982–83	First Division	1	0	0	0	0	0	0	0	1	0
West Ham United	1983–84	First Division	35	4	3	0	5	2	0	0	43	6
West Ham United	Total		528	88	40	3	55	8	24	3	647	102
Newcastle Blue Star	1984–85	Wearside League	1	0	0	0	0	0	0	0	1	0
Cork City	1985–86	League of Ireland	2	0	0	0	0	0	0	0	2	0
Career total			531	88	40	3	55	8	24	3	650	102

=== International ===
Appearances and goals by national team and year
National team	Year	Apps	Goals
England	1974	7	0
England	1975	1	0
England	1976	7	0
England	1977	4	1
England	1978	6	0
England	1979	8	0
England	1980	7	2
England	1981	4	2
England	1982	3	0
Total		47	5

Scores and results list England's goal tally first, score column indicates score after each Brooking goal

List of international goals scored
No.	Date	Venue	Opponent	Score	Result	Competition
1	16 November 1977	Wembley, London, England	Italy	2–0	2–0	1978 FIFA World Cup qualification
2	24 May 1980	Hampden Park, Glasgow, Scotland	Scotland	2–0	2–0	1980 British Home Championship
3	18 June 1980	Stadio San Paolo, Naples, Italy	Spain	1–0	2–1	UEFA Euro 1980
4	6 June 1981	Nepstadion, Budapest, Hungary	Hungary	1–0	3–1	1982 FIFA World Cup qualification
5	6 June 1981	Nepstadion, Budapest, Hungary	Hungary	2–1	3–1	1982 FIFA World Cup qualification

=== Managerial ===
Managerial record by team and tenure
Team	From	To	Record				
Team	From	To	P	W	D	L	Win %
West Ham United (caretaker)	24 April 2003	12 May 2003	3	2	1	0	66.7
West Ham United (caretaker)	24 August 2003	20 October 2003	11	7	3	1	63.6
Total			14	9	4	1	64.3

== Honours ==
West Ham United

- Football League Second Division: 1980–81
- FA Cup: 1974–75, 1979–80
- Football League Cup runner-up: 1980–81
- UEFA Cup Winners' Cup runner-up: 1975–76

Brooking was appointed as Member of the Order of the British Empire (MBE) in the 1981 Birthday Honours, promoted to Commander of same Order (CBE) in 1999, and knighted in 2004.

In November 2015, Brooking was awarded 'Global Football Ambassador' at the 4th annual Football Business Awards.

== Bibliography ==
- Brooking, Trevor; Hart, Michael (2014). My Life in Football. Simon & Schuster. ISBN 978-1-47113-044-1.
