= Reg Pratt =

English football club chairman

- Born: 20 June 1905; West Ham, England
- Died: 27 March 1984
- Occupations: Chairman, West Ham United

Clarence Reginald Harvey Pratt "Reg" Pratt (20 June 1905 - 27 March 1984) was a businessman and chairman of English football club West Ham United from 1950 until 1979.

Owner of a wood-yard in Upton Park, London, Pratt took over the chairmanship of West Ham in 1950 after the death of Will Cearns. Pratt had been a board member since 1941. One of his first jobs was to oversee the transition of managers from Charlie Paynter to Ted Fenton. Pratt moved Fenton into The Boleyn Ground several months before the anticipated end of Paynter's managership, to prepare him for the job. It was with Pratt's approval that Fenton, with Wally St Pier, set-up the youth teams and training methods which led to The Academy of Football and the establishment of training facilities at Chadwell Heath. In 1961 Pratt was responsible for the removal of Fenton and the appointment of Ron Greenwood. He retired from the chairmanship in May 1979, aged 74, after 29 years in the post becoming club president and handing over to Len Cearns. He died 27 March 1984.
