= Johnny Ayris =

English footballer (born 1953)

Personal information
- Full name: John Patrick Ayris
- Date of birth: 8 January 1953 (age 73)
- Place of birth: Wapping, England
- Height: 5 ft 5 in (1.65 m)
- Position: Right winger

Youth career
- Fulham
- West Ham United

Senior career*
Years	Team	Apps	(Gls)
1970–1977	West Ham United	57	(1)
1975	→ Cape Town City (loan)		
	Wimbledon	0	(0)
	Brentford	0	(0)

International career
1971	England Youth	7	(1)
- * Club domestic league appearances and goals

John Patrick Ayris (born 8 January 1953) is an English former football right winger.

== Club career ==
Ayris began his career at Fulham, before joining West Ham United after being spotted by a West Ham scout playing eight-a-side football in Mile End. On 3 October 1970, after excelling for West Ham's 'A' team in the Metropolitan League, Ayris made his debut for West Ham, at the age of 17, recording three assists for Geoff Hurst in a 3–1 home against Burnley. As a result of his impressive debut, manager Ron Greenwood offered Ayris a professional contract two days later. The following month, Ayris started in Bobby Moore's testimonial, scoring West Ham's second goal in a 3–3 draw against Scottish champions Celtic. On 11 September 1971, in a home game against Chelsea, Ayris was on the receiving end of a challenge from Ron Harris, leading to Ayris being substituted off. Hospital tests the following day confirmed Ayris had developed an air bubble on his lung. As a result of the challenge, Greenwood was reluctant to play Ayris regularly, wanting to protect Ayris and his diminutive figure against the First Division's more robust defenders.

In 1975, finding his first-team opportunities limited, Ayris spent three months on loan with South African side Cape Town City, missing West Ham's victory in the 1975 FA Cup Final as a result.

Ayris' last game for West Ham came on 16 October 1976, being substituted on in a 2–0 loss against Ipswich Town. In total, Ayris played 68 games in all competitions for West Ham, scoring two goals.

In the summer of 1977, Ayris signed for Wimbledon, who had been newly elected to the Football League. Ayris failed to make a league appearance for Wimbledon, later joining Brentford, for whom he also failed to make a league appearance for.

== International career ==
In 1971, Ayris made seven appearances for England Youth. Ayris' only goal for the side came in the 1971 UEFA European Under-18 Championship final in a 3–0 win against Portugal.
