= 1992–93 West Ham United F.C. season =

English football team season

West Ham United
1992–93 season
- Chairman: Terry Brown
- Manager: Billy Bonds
- Stadium: Boleyn Ground
- First Division: 2nd (promoted)
- FA Cup: Fourth round
- League Cup: Second round
- Top goalscorer: League: Morley (20); All: Morley (22)
- Average home league attendance: 16,001

During the 1992–93 English football season, West Ham United F.C. competed in the Football League First Division.

== Season summary ==
Having missed the first season of the new FA Premier League following relegation in 1991–92, West Ham made a swift return to the top flight by gaining promotion to Division One as runners-up under manager Billy Bonds. Promotion was clinched on the last day of the season with a 2–0 home win against Cambridge United with goals from David Speedie and Clive Allen.

Changes to the West Ham side for this successful campaign included Clive Allen (signed near the end of the previous campaign) featuring as Trevor Morley's strike partner following the departure of Frank McAvennie (with the previous season's top scorer Mike Small making nine goalless appearances before leaving the club), and the midfield featured two new players; Peter Butler and Mark Robson.

== Final league table ==
Pos	Team	Pld	W	D	L	GF	GA	GD	Pts	Qualification or relegation
1	Newcastle United (C, P)	46	29	9	8	92	38	+54	96	Promotion to the Premier League
2	West Ham United (P)	46	26	10	10	81	41	+40	88	Promotion to the Premier League
3	Portsmouth	46	26	10	10	80	46	+34	88	Qualification for the First Division play-offs
4	Tranmere Rovers	46	23	10	13	72	56	+16	79	Qualification for the First Division play-offs
5	Swindon Town (O, P)	46	21	13	12	74	59	+15	76	Qualification for the First Division play-offs

Source: rsssf.com
Rules for classification: 1) Points; 2) Goals scored; 3) Goal difference
(C) Champions; (O) Play-off winners; (P) Promoted

== Results ==
West Ham United's score comes first

=== Legend ===
Win	Draw	Loss

=== Football League First Division ===
Date	Opponent	Venue	Result	Attendance	Scorers
16 August 1992	Barnsley	A	1–0	6,798	C Allen
22 August 1992	Charlton Athletic	H	0–1	17,054	
29 August 1992	Newcastle United	A	0–2	29,855	
5 September 1992	Watford	H	2–1	11,921	M Allen, C Allen
12 September 1992	Peterborough United	A	3–1	10,657	C Allen, Keen, Morley
15 September 1992	Bristol City	A	5–1	14,130	C Allen (2), Robson, Morley (2)
20 September 1992	Derby County	H	1–1	11,493	Morley
27 September 1992	Portsmouth	A	1–0	12,388	C Allen
4 October 1992	Wolverhampton Wanderers	A	0–0	14,391	
11 October 1992	Sunderland	H	6–0	10,326	C Allen, Robson (2), Keen, Martin, Morley
17 October 1992	Bristol Rovers	A	4–0	6,187	C Allen, Dicks, Keen, Morley
24 October 1992	Swindon Town	H	0–1	17,842	
31 October 1992	Cambridge United	A	1–2	7,214	Morley
3 November 1992	Grimsby Town	A	1–1	9,119	Morley
7 November 1992	Notts County	H	2–0	12,345	C Allen, Morley
15 November 1992	Millwall	A	1–2	12,445	Robson
21 November 1992	Oxford United	H	5–3	11,842	Breacker, C Allen, Dicks (2), Morley
28 November 1992	Birmingham City	H	3–1	15,004	C Allen (2), Morley
4 December 1992	Tranmere Rovers	A	2–5	11,782	C Allen, Morley
12 December 1992	Southend United	H	2–0	15,739	C Allen, Morley
20 December 1992	Brentford	A	0–0	11,912	
26 December 1992	Charlton Athletic	A	1–1	8,337	Dicks
28 December 1992	Luton Town	H	2–2	18,786	Breacker, Dicks
10 January 1993	Derby County	A	2–0	13,737	Robson, Morley
16 January 1993	Portsmouth	H	2–0	18,127	Foster, Morley
27 January 1993	Bristol City	H	2–0	12,118	Robson, Morley
30 January 1993	Leicester City	A	2–1	18,838	Gale, Robson
6 February 1993	Barnsley	H	1–1	14,101	Jones
9 February 1993	Peterborough United	H	2–1	12,537	Butler, Jones
13 February 1993	Watford	A	2–1	13,115	Robson, Keen
21 February 1993	Newcastle United	H	0–0	24,159	
27 February 1993	Sunderland	A	0–0	19,068	
6 March 1993	Wolverhampton Wanderers	H	3–1	24,679	Dicks, Morley, Holmes
9 March 1993	Grimsby Town	H	2–1	13,170	Dicks (2)
13 March 1993	Notts County	A	0–1	10,272	
20 March 1993	Tranmere Rovers	H	2–0	16,369	Dicks (2)
23 March 1993	Oxford United	A	0–1	9,506	
28 March 1993	Millwall	H	2–2	15,723	Keen, Morley
3 April 1993	Birmingham City	A	2–1	19,053	Bishop, Brown
7 April 1993	Southend United	A	0–1	12,813	
11 April 1993	Leicester City	H	3–0	13,951	Keen, Speedie (2)
13 April 1993	Luton Town	A	0–2	10,959	
17 April 1993	Brentford	H	4–0	16,522	Butler, Keen, Morley, M Allen
24 April 1993	Bristol Rovers	H	2–1	16,682	Dicks, Speedie
2 May 1993	Swindon Town	A	3–1	17,004	Morley, C Allen, Brown
8 May 1993	Cambridge United	H	2–0	27,399	Speedie, C Allen

=== FA Cup ===
Round	Date	Opponent	Venue	Result	Attendance	Goalscorers
R3	2 January 1993	West Bromwich Albion	A	2–0	25,896	C Allen, Robson
R4	24 January 1993	Barnsley	A	1–4	13,716	Morley

=== League Cup ===
Round	Date	Opponent	Venue	Result	Attendance	Goalscorers
R2 First Leg	23 September 1992	Crewe Alexandra	H	0–0	6,981	
R2 Second Leg	7 October 1992	Crewe Alexandra	A	0–2 (lost 0–2 on agg)	5,427	

=== Anglo-Italian Cup ===
Round	Date	Opponent	Venue	Result	Attendance	Goalscorers
PR Group 8	2 September 1992	Bristol Rovers	H	2–2	4,809	Dicks (2)
PR Group 8	15 September 1992	Southend United	A	3–0	6,482	Dicks, Holmes, Morley
Group B	11 November 1992	U.S. Cremonese	A	0–2	1,639	
Group B	24 November 1992	A.C. Reggiana	H	2–0	6,872	C Allen (2)
Group B	8 December 1992	Cosenza Calcio 1914	A	1–0	800	C Allen
Group B	16 December 1992	Pisa S.C.	H	0–0	7,123	

== Squad ==
Note: Flags indicate national team as defined under FIFA eligibility rules; some limited exceptions apply. Players may hold more than one non-FIFA nationality.

Pos.	Nation	Player
GK	CZE	Ludek Miklosko (Note: Until 31 December 1992, Miklosko's nationality was Czechoslovakia.)
DF	ENG	Tim Breacker
DF	ENG	Steve Potts
DF	ENG	Alvin Martin
DF	ENG	Julian Dicks
MF	ENG	Martin Allen
MF	ENG	Mark Robson
MF	ENG	Peter Butler
FW	ENG	Trevor Morley
FW	ENG	Clive Allen
MF	ENG	Kevin Keen
DF	ENG	Tony Gale
MF	ENG	Ian Bishop
DF	ENG	Kenny Brown

Pos.	Nation	Player
MF	ENG	George Parris
FW	SCO	David Speedie
MF	ENG	Matty Holmes
FW	ENG	Mike Small
FW	ENG	Steve Jones
DF	ENG	Colin Foster
DF	ENG	Mitchell Thomas
FW	CAN	Alex Bunbury
FW	ENG	Simon Clarke
GK	ENG	Steve Banks
DF	ENG	Mike Basham
MF	IRL	Matt Holland
MF	ENG	Matthew Rush
MF	ENG	Danny Williamson
