= 1991–92 West Ham United F.C. season =

English football team season

West Ham United
1991–92 season
- Chairman: Terry Brown
- Manager: Billy Bonds
- Stadium: Boleyn Ground
- First Division: 22nd (relegated)
- FA Cup: Fifth round
- League Cup: Fourth round
- Full Members Cup: Semi-finals
- Top goalscorer: League: Small (13); All: Small (18)
- Average home league attendance: 21,342

During the 1991–92 English football season, West Ham United F.C. competed in the Football League First Division.

== Season summary ==
1991–92 was West Ham United's first season back in the First Division following promotion, ending a two-year absence from the top flight.

However, their return to the First Division lasted just one season and they were relegated in bottom place, missing out on a place in the new FA Premier League, which would be created for the 1992-93 season. Their chances of survival were not helped by the fact that key players Trevor Morley and Julian Dicks missed large stretches of the season due to injury and off-field issues, such as the infamous Bond Scheme, which exacerbated the club's poor league form.

The few bright spots of the season came in the final stages – after relegation was confirmed – in the shape of a 1–0 win over Manchester United which effectively ended the opposition's title hopes, and then came a 3–0 demolition of eighth-placed Nottingham Forest in which striker Frank McAvennie ended his second spell at Upton Park by scoring a hat-trick. The season could have ended very differently for the Hammers had they been able to show such fine form on a more regular basis.

== Final league table ==
Pos	Team	Pld	W	D	L	GF	GA	GD	Pts	Qualification or relegation
18	Norwich City	42	11	12	19	47	63	−16	45	Qualification for the FA Premier League
19	Coventry City	42	11	11	20	35	44	−9	44	Qualification for the FA Premier League
20	Luton Town (R)	42	10	12	20	38	71	−33	42	Relegation to the First Division (Note: From the 1992–93 season, the first tier became the Premier League, and the second tier, then known as the Second Division, was renamed to the First Division.)
21	Notts County (R)	42	10	10	22	40	62	−22	40	Relegation to the First Division
22	West Ham United (R)	42	9	11	22	37	59	−22	38	Relegation to the First Division

Source: World Football
Rules for classification: 1) Points; 2) Goal difference; 3) Goals scored
(R) Relegated

== Results ==
West Ham United's score comes first

=== Legend ===
Win	Draw	Loss

=== Football League First Division ===
Date	Opponent	Venue	Result	Attendance	Scorers
17 August 1991	Luton Town	H	0–0	25,079	
20 August 1991	Sheffield United	A	1–1	21,463	Small
24 August 1991	Wimbledon	A	0–2	10,081	
28 August 1991	Aston Villa	H	3–1	23,644	Small, Rosenior, Brown
31 August 1991	Notts County	H	0–2	20,093	
4 September 1991	Queens Park Rangers	A	0–0	16,616	
7 September 1991	Chelsea	H	1–1	18,875	Small
14 September 1991	Norwich City	A	1–2	15,348	Small
17 September 1991	Crystal Palace	A	3–2	21,363	Morley, Thomas, Small
21 September 1991	Manchester City	H	1–2	25,558	Brown
28 September 1991	Nottingham Forest	A	2–2	25,613	Small (2)
5 October 1991	Coventry City	H	0–1	21,817	
19 October 1991	Oldham Athletic	A	2–2	14,365	Small, McAvennie
26 October 1991	Tottenham Hotspur	H	2–1	23,946	Thomas, Small
2 November 1991	Arsenal	A	1–0	33,539	Small
17 November 1991	Liverpool	H	0–0	23,569	
23 November 1991	Manchester United	A	1–2	47,185	McAvennie
30 November 1991	Sheffield Wednesday	H	1–2	24,116	Breacker
7 December 1991	Everton	A	0–4	21,563	
21 December 1991	Sheffield United	H	1–1	19,287	Dicks (pen)
26 December 1991	Aston Villa	A	1–3	31,959	McAvennie
28 December 1991	Notts County	A	0–3	11,163	
1 January 1992	Leeds United	H	1–3	21,766	Dicks (pen)
11 January 1992	Wimbledon	H	1–1	18,485	Morley
18 January 1992	Luton Town	A	1–0	11,088	Small
1 February 1992	Oldham Athletic	H	1–0	19,012	Thomas
22 February 1992	Sheffield Wednesday	A	1–2	24,150	Small
29 February 1992	Everton	H	0–2	20,976	
3 March 1992	Southampton	A	0–1	14,548	
11 March 1992	Liverpool	A	0–1	30,821	
14 March 1992	Arsenal	H	0–2	22,640	
21 March 1992	Queens Park Rangers	H	2–2	20,401	Breacker, Small
28 March 1992	Leeds United	A	0–0	31,101	
1 April 1992	Tottenham Hotspur	A	0–3	31,809	
4 April 1992	Chelsea	A	1–2	20,684	C Allen
11 April 1992	Norwich City	H	4–0	16,896	Bishop, Rush (2), Dicks (pen)
14 April 1992	Southampton	H	0–1	18,298	
18 April 1992	Manchester City	A	0–2	25,601	
20 April 1992	Crystal Palace	H	0–2	17,710	
22 April 1992	Manchester United	H	1–0	24,197	Brown
25 April 1992	Coventry City	A	0–1	15,398	
2 May 1992	Nottingham Forest	H	3–0	20,629	McAvennie (3)

=== FA Cup ===
Round	Date	Opponent	Venue	Result	Attendance	Goalscorers
R3	4 January 1992	Farnborough Town	A	1–1	23,449	Dicks
R3R	14 January 1992	Farnborough Town	H	1–0	23,869	Morley
R4	25 January 1992	Wrexham	H	2–2	24,712	Morley, Dicks
R4R	4 February 1992	Wrexham	A	1–0	17,995	Foster
R5	15 February 1992	Sunderland	A	1–1	25,475	Small
R5R	26 February 1992	Sunderland	H	2–3	25,830	M Allen (2)

=== League Cup ===
Round	Date	Opponent	Venue	Result	Attendance	Goalscorers
R2 1st leg	24 September 1991	Bradford City	A	1–1	7,034	Small
R2 2nd leg	9 October 1991	Bradford City	H	4–0 (won 5–1 on agg)	17,232	Small, Morley, Keen, Parris
R3	29 October 1991	Sheffield United	A	2–0	11,144	McAvennie, Small (pen)
R4	4 December 1991	Norwich City	A	1–2	16,325	Small

=== Full Members Cup ===
Round	Date	Opponent	Venue	Result	Attendance	Goalscorers
R2	22 October 1991	Cambridge United	H	2–1	7,812	McAvennie, Parris
R3	26 November 1991	Brighton & Hove Albion	H	2–0	8,146	McAvennie (2)
S Area SF	7 January 1992	Southampton	A	1–2	6,861	Bishop 34'

== Squad ==
Number		Player	Position	Lge Apps	Lge Gls	FAC Apps	FAC Gls	LC Apps	LC Gls	Date signed	Previous club
1991–92 West Ham United First XI
1	(Czechoslovakia)	Ludek Miklosko	GK	36		3		4		February 1990	Banik Ostrava
2	(England)	Kenny Brown	D	25(2)	3	4		1		August 1991	Plymouth Argyle
3	(England)	Julian Dicks (Hammer of the Year)	D	23	3	6	2			March 1988	Birmingham City
4	(England)	Tim Breacker	D	33(1)	1	6		4		October 1990	Luton Town
5	(England)	Steve Potts	D	34		5		3		May 1984	Academy
6	(England)	Mitchell Thomas	D	34(1)	3	4		4		1991	Tottenham Hotspur
7	(England)	Ian Bishop (captain)	M	41	1	3		4		December 1989	Manchester City
8	(Scotland)	Frank McAvennie	F	16(4)	6	4		2 (1)	1	March 1989	Celtic
9	(England)	Mike Small	F	37(3)	13	4 (1)	1	4	4	1991	Brighton
10	(England)	Kevin Keen	M	20(9)		5		2	1	1986	Academy
11	(England)	Stuart Slater	M	41		6		4		1987	Academy
Important Players
4	(England)	Tony Gale	CB	24(1)		2		3 (1)		August 1983	Fulham
5	(England)	Colin Foster	CB	24		5	1	2		1989	Nottingham Forest
6	(England)	George Parris	D/M	20(1)				4	1	1985	Academy
11	(England)	Trevor Morley	CF	13(11)	2	2 (3)	2	2	1	December 1989	Manchester City
10	(England)	Martin Allen	M	14(5)		2	2	1 (1)		August 1989	Queens Park Rangers
8	(England)	Matthew Rush	M	3 (7)	2					1990	Academy
Other Players
10	(Sierra Leone)	Leroy Rosenior	CF	5 (4)	1					March 1988	Fulham
5	(England)	Alvin Martin	CB	7						July 1976	Academy
1	(England)	Tony Parks	GK	6		3				1991	Fulham
10	(England)	Clive Allen	CF	4	1					March 1992	Chelsea
6	(Netherlands)	Ray Atteveld	CB	1						February 1992	Everton
10	(England)	Dean Martin	CF	1 (1)		0 (1)				1991	Fisher Athletic
12	(England)	Simon Clarke	F	0 (1)						1990	Academy
14	(Republic of Ireland)	Chris Hughton	LB	0 (1)						1990	Tottenham Hotspur

== Reserve squad ==
Note: Flags indicate national team as defined under FIFA eligibility rules; some limited exceptions apply. Players may hold more than one non-FIFA nationality.

Pos.	Nation	Player
GK	ENG	Steve Banks
MF	NIR	Kevin Horlock

Pos.	Nation	Player
FW	ENG	Tony Cottee
FW	NIR	Iain Dowie

== Transfers ==
=== In ===
Date	Pos	Name	From	Fee
3 June 1991	MF	Dean Martin	Fisher Athletic	£25,000
2 August 1991	DF	Kenny Brown	Plymouth Argyle	£175,000
7 August 1991	DF	Mitchell Thomas	Tottenham Hotspur	£525,000
27 March 1992	FW	Clive Allen	Chelsea	£275,000

=== Out ===
Date	Pos	Name	To	Fee
5 August 1991	FW	Jimmy Quinn	AFC Bournemouth	£40,000
3 September 1991	FW	Iain Dowie	Southampton	£500,000
1 January 1992	FW	Mike Macari	Stoke City	Signed

Transfers in: ▼£1,000,000
Transfers out: ▲£540,000
Total spending: ▼£460,000
