= 1991–92 in English football =

Football in England
- Season: 1991–92

Men's football
- First Division: Leeds United
- Second Division: Ipswich Town
- Third Division: Brentford
- Fourth Division: Burnley
- FA Cup: Liverpool
- League Cup: Manchester United
- Charity Shield: Arsenal; Tottenham Hotspur (Shared)

Women's football
- National League Premier Division: Doncaster Belles
- National League Division One North: Bronte
- National League Division One South: Arsenal
- WFA Cup: Doncaster Belles
- National League Cup: Arsenal

The 1991–92 season was the 112th season of competitive football in England.

== Overview ==
=== First Division ===
The last league championship before the creation of the Premier League was won by Leeds United who overhauled Manchester United thanks to the efforts of, among others, Gordon Strachan, Lee Chapman, David Batty, Gary Speed, Gary McAllister and Eric Cantona. After runners-up Manchester United came newly promoted Sheffield Wednesday.

Defending champions Arsenal slipped to fourth place and were never a serious threat to retain their title. The previous season's runners-up Liverpool dropped to sixth, below Manchester City, in their first full season under the management of Graeme Souness. It was Liverpool's first finish outside the top two since 1981.

Newly promoted West Ham United were relegated in bottom place, with another newly promoted side – Notts County – following days later. The last day of the season saw Luton Town lose their top flight status after ten seasons.

=== Second Division ===
John Lyall took Ipswich Town back to the First Division after a six-year absence. The Suffolk club were followed by runners-up Middlesbrough, but it was play-off winners Blackburn Rovers whose promotion made the biggest headlines. Bankrolled by millionaire chairman Jack Walker and managed by former Liverpool boss Kenny Dalglish, Rovers beat Leicester City 1–0 in the play-off final to end a 26-year absence from the top flight.

The Second Division relegation places were occupied by Port Vale, Plymouth Argyle and Brighton & Hove Albion. Brighton had been losing finalists in the play-offs just twelve months before going down, but their fortunes had been ruined by financial problems and the loss of striker Mike Small to West Ham United in the 1991 close season.

=== Third Division ===
New manager Phil Holder guided Brentford to a surprise Third Division championship success, while Terry Cooper's Birmingham City occupied the runners-up spot. The play-offs were won by Chris Turner's Peterborough United.

The Third Division relegation zone was occupied by Shrewsbury Town, Bury, Torquay United and Darlington.

=== Fourth Division ===
Burnley won the Fourth Division title and became the second team, after Wolverhampton Wanderers, to have been the champions of all four divisions of the Football League. Also going up were Rotherham United, Mansfield Town and play-off winners Blackpool.

On 25 March 1992, Aldershot were declared bankrupt and obliged to resign from the Football League following a long battle to stay afloat – their record was expunged. Carlisle United finished bottom, but there was no relegation from the league in the 1991–92 season. Conference champions Colchester United returned to the league after a two-year absence.

=== FA Cup ===
Liverpool's Graeme Souness compensated for a disappointing season in the league by winning the FA Cup. They beat Second Division underdogs Sunderland 2–0 in the final.

=== League Cup ===
Manchester United missed out on the league title but achieved success in the League Cup with a 1–0 triumph against Nottingham Forest in the final.

== League tables ==
=== First Division ===
This was the last season of the Football League First Division as the top division of English football before the creation of the FA Premier League.

Leeds United and Manchester United fought a fierce duel for the title, with the leadership changing several times, before Leeds finally clinched the title. A key factor in their success was the new year arrival of French forward Eric Cantona, while a key factor in Manchester United's downfall was a shortage of goals in the second half of the season where they dropped points against several teams they had been widely expected to beat. Consolation for the unsuccessful title challenge at Old Trafford came in the shape of EFL Cup glory. Sheffield Wednesday's third-place finish was their highest for decades, while defending champions Arsenal finished fourth and suffered an early exit in the European Cup as well as a shock first hurdle exit from the FA Cup at the hands of Wrexham. Manchester City finished fifth for the second season in a row. Liverpool finished sixth but compensated for a disappointing league season by winning the FA Cup in their first full season under the management of Graeme Souness.

Two young players who made a major impact in the First Division were Ryan Giggs of Manchester United (voted PFA Young Player of the Year) and Steve McManaman of Liverpool.

FA Cup holders Tottenham Hotspur endured a disappointing season, finishing a lowly 15th in the league, their chances of further success not helped by the season-long absence of Paul Gascoigne through injury. Gascoigne's projected move to Lazio in Italy was finally confirmed at the season's end, when top scorer Gary Lineker followed Gascoigne out of the White Hart Lane exit door to finish his playing days in Japan.

Newly promoted West Ham United and Notts County went straight back down, joined by a Luton Town side who had enjoyed a memorable 10-year run in the top flight. Luton would not return to the top division until 2023. Coventry City narrowly avoided relegation after a decline in form during the final four months of the season after Terry Butcher was controversially sacked as manager in favour of Don Howe, who himself left in the close season to be replaced by Bobby Gould.

Oldham Athletic survived in their first top flight season for nearly 70 years.

Pos	Team	Pld	W	D	L	GF	GA	GD	Pts	Qualification or relegation
1	Leeds United (C)	42	22	16	4	74	37	+37	82	Qualification for the UEFA Champions League first round and qualification for the FA Premier League
2	Manchester United	42	21	15	6	63	33	+30	78	Qualification for the UEFA Cup first round and qualification for the FA Premier League (Note: Manchester United also won the League Cup – that UEFA Cup qualifying place was passed down to the third-placed League team.)
3	Sheffield Wednesday	42	21	12	9	62	49	+13	75	Qualification for the UEFA Cup first round and qualification for the FA Premier League
4	Arsenal	42	19	15	8	81	46	+35	72	Qualification for the FA Premier League
5	Manchester City	42	20	10	12	61	48	+13	70	Qualification for the FA Premier League
6	Liverpool	42	16	16	10	47	40	+7	64	Qualification for the European Cup Winners' Cup first round and qualification for the FA Premier League
7	Aston Villa	42	17	9	16	48	44	+4	60	Qualification for the FA Premier League
8	Nottingham Forest	42	16	11	15	60	58	+2	59	Qualification for the FA Premier League
9	Sheffield United	42	16	9	17	65	63	+2	57	Qualification for the FA Premier League
10	Crystal Palace	42	14	15	13	53	61	−8	57	Qualification for the FA Premier League
11	Queens Park Rangers	42	12	18	12	48	47	+1	54	Qualification for the FA Premier League
12	Everton	42	13	14	15	52	51	+1	53	Qualification for the FA Premier League
13	Wimbledon	42	13	14	15	53	53	0	53	Qualification for the FA Premier League
14	Chelsea	42	13	14	15	50	60	−10	53	Qualification for the FA Premier League
15	Tottenham Hotspur	42	15	7	20	58	63	−5	52	Qualification for the FA Premier League
16	Southampton	42	14	10	18	39	55	−16	52	Qualification for the FA Premier League
17	Oldham Athletic	42	14	9	19	63	67	−4	51	Qualification for the FA Premier League
18	Norwich City	42	11	12	19	47	63	−16	45	Qualification for the FA Premier League
19	Coventry City	42	11	11	20	35	44	−9	44	Qualification for the FA Premier League
20	Luton Town (R)	42	10	12	20	38	71	−33	42	Relegation to the First Division (Note: From the 1992–93 season, the first tier became the Premier League, and the second tier, then known as the Second Division, was renamed to the First Division.)
21	Notts County (R)	42	10	10	22	40	62	−22	40	Relegation to the First Division
22	West Ham United (R)	42	9	11	22	37	59	−22	38	Relegation to the First Division

Source: World Football
Rules for classification: 1) Points; 2) Goal difference; 3) Goals scored
(C) Champions; (R) Relegated

=== Second Division ===
The Second Division promotion race was an exciting one throughout the season, with the promise of extra wealth for the promoted clubs after the creation of the lucrative new FA Premier League was confirmed. The first team to secure promotion were champions Ipswich Town, who ended their six-year exile from the top flight. The second team to go up were Middlesbrough, who clinched runners-up spot on the final day. The final promotion place went to Blackburn Rovers, who had thrived since the takeover of the club by local millionaire Jack Walker the previous season, his masterstroke coming in the autumn of 1991 when he appointed Kenny Dalglish as manager and allowed him to spend millions on building a promotion-winning team. Blackburn had entered the new year looking all set to go up automatically, but a run of bad results meant that they had to win their final game of the season to qualify for the playoffs. They finally won promotion with a Wembley win over Leicester City, who had now played at the famous stadium five times and lost each time.

The Second Division promotion race had also seen a few unlikely contenders. Swindon Town, under the management of former England star Glenn Hoddle, had gone top of the table for the first time in their history in October, but an eighth-place finish was not enough for even a place in the playoffs. Southend United, playing at this level for the first time, briefly topped the table on New Year's Day, but eventually faded to finish in mid-table. Their brief lead of the table came at the expense of Cambridge United, another side hopeful of a unique third successive promotion. Unlike Southend, the East Anglian side remained in the hunt right up to the end of the season, finishing fifth and qualifying for the playoffs, but a heavy defeat to Leicester City in the semi-finals ended their dreams of playing in the new Premier League.

Sunderland failed to finish anywhere near the top of the Second Division but enjoyed a remarkable run to the final of the FA Cup, where they lost to Liverpool.

Port Vale were relegated after three years at this level, ultimately being undone by a poor second half of the season. Brighton suffered a shock relegation, only a year after appearing in the play-off final, as financial problems began to take their toll at the south coast club. Plymouth Argyle filled the final relegation spot, as a late improvement in form following the arrival of legendary England goalkeeper Peter Shilton as manager ultimately proved not to be enough to save the Pilgrims. Escaping relegation at Plymouth's expense were Newcastle United, who had spent most of the season hopelessly adrift in the relegation zone and looking doomed to their first-ever spell in the third tier, before having their own revival under Shilton's former England team-mate, Kevin Keegan.

Pos	Team	Pld	W	D	L	GF	GA	GD	Pts	Qualification or relegation
1	Ipswich Town (C, P)	46	24	12	10	70	50	+20	84	Promotion to the FA Premier League
2	Middlesbrough (P)	46	23	11	12	58	41	+17	80	Promotion to the FA Premier League
3	Derby County	46	23	9	14	69	51	+18	78	Qualification for the Second Division play-offs
4	Leicester City	46	23	8	15	62	55	+7	77	Qualification for the Second Division play-offs
5	Cambridge United	46	19	17	10	65	47	+18	74	Qualification for the Second Division play-offs
6	Blackburn Rovers (O, P)	46	21	11	14	70	53	+17	74	Qualification for the Second Division play-offs
7	Charlton Athletic	46	20	11	15	54	48	+6	71	Qualification for the First Division (Note: From the 1992–93 season, the first tier became the Premier League, the second tier - then known as the Second Division - was renamed to the First Division, and the third tier - then known as the Third Division - was renamed to the Second Division.)
8	Swindon Town	46	18	15	13	69	55	+14	69	Qualification for the First Division
9	Portsmouth	46	19	12	15	65	51	+14	69	Qualification for the First Division
10	Watford	46	18	11	17	51	48	+3	65	Qualification for the First Division
11	Wolverhampton Wanderers	46	18	10	18	61	54	+7	64	Qualification for the First Division
12	Southend United	46	17	11	18	63	63	0	62	Qualification for the First Division
13	Bristol Rovers	46	16	14	16	60	63	−3	62	Qualification for the First Division
14	Tranmere Rovers	46	14	19	13	56	56	0	61	Qualification for the First Division
15	Millwall	46	17	10	19	64	71	−7	61	Qualification for the First Division
16	Barnsley	46	16	11	19	46	57	−11	59	Qualification for the First Division
17	Bristol City	46	13	15	18	55	71	−16	54	Qualification for the First Division
18	Sunderland	46	14	11	21	61	65	−4	53	Qualification for the First Division
19	Grimsby Town	46	14	11	21	47	62	−15	53	Qualification for the First Division
20	Newcastle United	46	13	13	20	66	84	−18	52	Qualification for the First Division
21	Oxford United	46	13	11	22	66	73	−7	50	Qualification for the First Division
22	Plymouth Argyle (R)	46	13	9	24	42	64	−22	48	Relegation to the Second Division
23	Brighton & Hove Albion (R)	46	12	11	23	56	77	−21	47	Relegation to the Second Division
24	Port Vale (R)	46	10	15	21	42	59	−17	45	Relegation to the Second Division

Rules for classification: 1) Points; 2) Goal difference; 3) Goals scored
(C) Champions; (O) Play-off winners; (P) Promoted; (R) Relegated

=== Third Division ===
Brentford, who had played in the Third and Fourth Divisions for most of the postwar era, clinched the Third Division title to secure a place in the new Division One. They were joined by runners-up Birmingham City, who finally escaped from this division at the third attempt, and playoff winners Peterborough United, who won a second successive promotion to secure second-tier football for the very first time.

West Bromwich Albion, playing in the Third Division for the first time, were in the promotion race throughout the season but eventually finished seventh to miss out on the playoffs. Bolton Wanderers, who had only missed out on promotion on goal difference a year earlier, could only manage a mid table finish and sacked manager Phil Neal after nearly seven years in charge.

Newly promoted Darlington and Torquay United both suffered an instant relegation back to the league's basement division. They went down with Bury and Shrewsbury Town. The former had been in the playoffs a year earlier, while the latter had been in the Second Division three years earlier.

Pos	Team	Pld	W	D	L	GF	GA	GD	Pts	Promotion or relegation
1	Brentford (C, P)	46	25	7	14	81	55	+26	82	Promotion to the First Division (Note: From the 1992–93 season, the second tier - then known as the Second Division - was renamed to the First Division, the third tier - then known as the Third Division - was renamed to the Second Division, and the fourth tier - then known as the Fourth Division - was renamed to the Third Division.)
2	Birmingham City (P)	46	23	12	11	69	52	+17	81	Promotion to the First Division
3	Huddersfield Town	46	22	12	12	59	38	+21	78	Qualification for the Third Division play-offs
4	Stoke City	46	21	14	11	69	49	+20	77	Qualification for the Third Division play-offs
5	Stockport County	46	22	10	14	75	51	+24	76	Qualification for the Third Division play-offs
6	Peterborough United (O, P)	46	20	14	12	65	58	+7	74	Qualification for the Third Division play-offs
7	West Bromwich Albion	46	19	14	13	64	49	+15	71	Qualification for the Second Division
8	Bournemouth	46	20	11	15	52	48	+4	71	Qualification for the Second Division
9	Fulham	46	19	13	14	57	53	+4	70	Qualification for the Second Division
10	Leyton Orient	46	18	11	17	62	52	+10	65	Qualification for the Second Division
11	Hartlepool United	46	18	11	17	57	57	0	65	Qualification for the Second Division
12	Reading	46	16	13	17	59	62	−3	61	Qualification for the Second Division
13	Bolton Wanderers	46	14	17	15	57	56	+1	59	Qualification for the Second Division
14	Hull City	46	16	11	19	54	54	0	59	Qualification for the Second Division
15	Wigan Athletic	46	15	14	17	58	64	−6	59	Qualification for the Second Division
16	Bradford City	46	13	19	14	62	61	+1	58	Qualification for the Second Division
17	Preston North End	46	15	12	19	61	72	−11	57	Qualification for the Second Division
18	Chester City	46	14	14	18	56	59	−3	56	Qualification for the Second Division
19	Swansea City	46	14	14	18	55	65	−10	56	Qualification for the Second Division
20	Exeter City	46	14	11	21	57	80	−23	53	Qualification for the Second Division
21	Bury (R)	46	13	12	21	55	74	−19	51	Relegation to the Third Division
22	Shrewsbury Town (R)	46	12	11	23	53	68	−15	47	Relegation to the Third Division
23	Torquay United (R)	46	13	8	25	42	68	−26	47	Relegation to the Third Division
24	Darlington (R)	46	10	7	29	56	90	−34	37	Relegation to the Third Division

(C) Champions; (O) Play-off winners; (P) Promoted; (R) Relegated

=== Fourth Division ===
Burnley sealed the Fourth Division title to end their seven-year spell in the league's basement division and become only the second team after Wolverhampton Wanderers to win all four divisions of the English league. They were joined by newly relegated Rotherham United, Mansfield Town and playoff winners Blackpool.

After spending several years struggling to stay afloat, Aldershot were declared bankrupt and obliged to resign from the league on 25 March 1992, having played 36 games in the Fourth Division – their record was expunged. Carlisle United finished bottom of the Fourth Division, but there was no relegation from the league this season due to the continued expansion of the Football League, although Colchester United's return to the league after two years would make them its 93rd member rather than its 94th due to the demise of Aldershot.

However, there were doubts about the future of Maidstone United, who were struggling with huge debts and low crowds, after they were refused planning permission to build a new stadium on land they had bought in Maidstone. There were also problems with their tenancy of the Watling Street stadium in Dartford, which left them with the threat of being without a stadium for the 1992–93 season.

Pos	Team	Pld	W	D	L	GF	GA	GD	Pts	Promotion or relegation
1	Burnley (C, P)	42	25	8	9	79	43	+36	83	Promotion to the Second Division (Note: From the 1992–93 season, the third tier - then known as the Third Division - was renamed to the Second Division, and the fourth tier - then known as the Fourth Division - was renamed to the Third Division.)
2	Rotherham United (P)	42	22	11	9	70	37	+33	77	Promotion to the Second Division
3	Mansfield Town (P)	42	23	8	11	75	53	+22	77	Promotion to the Second Division
4	Blackpool (O, P)	42	22	10	10	71	45	+26	76	Qualification for the Fourth Division play-offs
5	Scunthorpe United	42	21	9	12	64	59	+5	72	Qualification for the Fourth Division play-offs
6	Crewe Alexandra	42	20	10	12	66	51	+15	70	Qualification for the Fourth Division play-offs
7	Barnet	42	21	6	15	81	61	+20	69	Qualification for the Fourth Division play-offs
8	Rochdale	42	18	13	11	57	53	+4	67	Qualification for the Third Division
9	Cardiff City	42	17	15	10	66	53	+13	66	Qualification for the European Cup Winners' Cup first round and qualification for the Third Division
10	Lincoln City	42	17	11	14	50	44	+6	62	Qualification for the Third Division
11	Gillingham	42	15	12	15	63	53	+10	57	Qualification for the Third Division
12	Scarborough	42	15	12	15	64	68	−4	57	Qualification for the Third Division
13	Chesterfield	42	14	11	17	49	61	−12	53	Qualification for the Third Division
14	Wrexham	42	14	9	19	52	73	−21	51	Qualification for the Third Division
15	Walsall	42	12	13	17	48	58	−10	49	Qualification for the Third Division
16	Northampton Town	42	11	13	18	46	57	−11	46	Qualification for the Third Division
17	Hereford United	42	12	8	22	44	57	−13	44	Qualification for the Third Division
18	Maidstone United	42	8	18	16	45	56	−11	42	Qualification for the Third Division
19	York City	42	8	16	18	42	58	−16	40	Qualification for the Third Division
20	Halifax Town	42	10	8	24	34	75	−41	38	Qualification for the Third Division
21	Doncaster Rovers	42	9	8	25	40	65	−25	35	Qualification for the Third Division
22	Carlisle United	42	7	13	22	41	67	−26	34	Qualification for the Third Division
23	Aldershot	0	0	0	0	0	0	0	0 (Note: Aldershot resigned from the Football League on 25 March 1992 and subsequently folded; the club's playing record of Pld36 W3 D8 L25 GF21 GA63 Pts17 was expunged.)	Club folded

(C) Champions; (O) Play-off winners; (P) Promoted

== Events ==
=== Premier League gets go-ahead ===
1991–92 was the last season of the four-division Football League. For 1992–93, the First Division would become the breakaway FA Premier League, and the Football League would contain just three divisions. The new league was seen as the last chance to maintain interest in a sport which had been blighted in recent years by numerous incidents of hooliganism and images of decay at football grounds which had contributed to the Bradford Fire Disaster and the Hillsborough Disaster.

=== Leeds grab title a decade after relegation ===
Leeds United won the last-ever league championship after a decade of relegation and before the creation of the FA Premier League, two years after returning to the top flight. Driving force in the title triumph was experienced midfielder Gordon Strachan, who helped Leeds overtake Strachan's former club Manchester United in the title race.

=== Dalglish makes comeback to deliver promised land to Blackburn ===
Blackburn Rovers, managed by former Liverpool manager Kenny Dalglish, won promotion to the new F.A Premier League to end a 26-year exile from the top flight of English football. Their triumph was sealed with a 1–0 win over Leicester City in the playoff final, thanks to a penalty from Mike Newell – a former Leicester striker.

=== Aldershot go bust ===
Aldershot, who had been plagued with financial problems for two years, finally went out of business on 25 March. Their Fourth Division record was expunged and their place in the Football League was taken over by Colchester United for the 1992–93 season. A new club Aldershot Town was formed almost immediately, and joined the Third Division of the Isthmian League for the following season.

=== League Cup win at last for United ===
Manchester United won the League Cup for the first time in their history after Brian McClair scored the only goal of the game in a 1–0 win over Nottingham Forest at Wembley. It was some consolation for their failed title challenge.

=== Souness delivers Cup glory for Reds ===
Liverpool won the FA Cup for the fifth time in their first full season under the management of Graeme Souness, beating Second Division underdogs Sunderland 2–0 in the final at Wembley. Ian Rush set a new record for scoring in FA Cup Finals at Wembley with his 5th goal.

=== Burnley enter the history books ===
Burnley won the last Fourth Division championship to join Wolves as only the second English team to have been champions of all four divisions of the English league. It was Burnley's first successful season after a period of misery which had almost seen them relegated to the Conference in 1987.

=== The Owls make an impressive comeback ===
Newly promoted Sheffield Wednesday finished third in the league and qualified for the UEFA Cup, confounding suggestions that 37-year-old player-manager Trevor Francis was too inexperienced to keep the Owls in the top flight.

=== Euro final returns to Wembley ===
Wembley hosted the European Cup final for the first time in 14 years. Barcelona of Spain beat Sampdoria of Italy 1–0.

=== Keegan rescues Newcastle ===
Newcastle United sacked manager Ossie Ardiles, just 36 hours after he was told by chairman John Hall that his job was safe. Hall appointed former striker Kevin Keegan as manager in hope of staving off relegation from the Second Division – and he succeeded.

== Awards ==
In his last season at Tottenham Hotspur before joining Nagoya Grampus Eight of Japan, Gary Lineker was voted FWA Footballer of the Year after scoring 35 goals in all competitions during the 1991–92 season.

The PFA Players' Player of the Year award went to Manchester United's central defender Gary Pallister.

The PFA voted Manchester United's 18-year-old winger Ryan Giggs as Young Player of the Year, ahead of Steve McManaman and Giggs' United teammate, Lee Sharpe. Like Pallister, Giggs also picked up a League Cup winner's medal, but just missed out on the league title.

== Successful managers ==
Leeds United manager Howard Wilkinson brought the league championship trophy to Elland Road just two seasons after they gained promotion to the First Division. As of 2025, Wilkinson remains the most recent English manager to have won the English league championship title.

Manchester United's Alex Ferguson added another trophy to the Old Trafford boardroom, this time the club's first-ever League Cup.

Graeme Souness marked his first full season as Liverpool manager with an FA Cup triumph.

Trevor Francis had a successful first season as player-manager of Sheffield Wednesday, who finished third in the league and qualified for the UEFA Cup to end a 28-year absence from European competitions.

John Lyall brought First Division football back to Ipswich Town for the first time since 1985–86.

Kenny Dalglish put together an impressive squad to win promotion to the new FA Premier League for fallen giant Blackburn Rovers.

Brian Little transformed Leicester City from relegation candidates the previous season into promotion contenders, reaching the play-off final in his first season in charge.

Phil Holder had a successful first season in management by winning the Third Division title with Brentford.

Chris Turner guided Peterborough United to a second successive promotion as they won the Third Division playoffs to claim a place in the second tier of the English league for the first time in their history.

Jimmy Mullen won the last-ever Fourth Division title with Burnley, who joined Wolverhampton Wanderers in the distinction of having been champions of all four divisions of the English league.

Roy McDonough steered Colchester United to title success in the Conference to return the club to the Football League after a two-year exile.

== Top goalscorers ==
=== First Division ===
- Ian Wright (Crystal Palace/Arsenal) – 29 goals

=== Second Division ===
- Duncan Shearer (Swindon Town/Blackburn Rovers)/David Speedie (Blackburn Rovers) – 23 goals

=== Third Division ===
- Dean Holdsworth (Brentford)/Iwan Roberts (Huddersfield Town) – 24 goals

=== Fourth Division ===
- Dave Bamber (Blackpool)/Phil Stant (Mansfield Town) – 26 goals

== Famous debutants ==
29 January 1992: Ray Parlour, 18-year-old midfielder, makes his debut for Arsenal in their 2–0 league defeat against Liverpool.

25 April 1992: David Unsworth, 18-year-old defender, comes on and scores as a substitute on his debut for Everton as they draw 3-3 with Tottenham Hotspur.

2 May 1992: Eddie Newton, 20-year-old midfielder, comes on and scores as a substitute on his debut for Chelsea in the final game of the league season as they lose 2–1 to Everton.

2 May 1992: Steve Stone, 20-year-old midfielder, comes on as a substitute on his debut for Nottingham Forest in the final game of the league season as they lose 3-0 to West Ham United.

== Women's football ==
=== Women's National League ===
==== National Division ====
Pos	Team	Pld	W	D	L	GF	GA	GD	Pts	Qualification or relegation
1	Doncaster Belles (C)	14	14	0	0	89	4	+85	28	
2	Red Star Southampton	14	10	1	3	32	18	+14	21	
3	Wimbledon	14	8	2	4	34	27	+7	18	
4	Knowsley United	14	6	5	3	31	30	+1	17	
5	Maidstone Tigresses	14	3	4	7	13	35	−22	10	
6	Ipswich Town	14	2	4	8	15	42	−27	8	
7	Millwall Lionesses	14	2	2	10	11	30	−19	6	
8	Notts Rangers	14	1	2	11	17	56	−39	4	Merged with Spondon to form Stanton Rangers

Source: WFA NL
(C) Champions

==== Division One North ====
Pos	Team	Pld	W	D	L	GF	GA	GD	Pts	Promotion or relegation
1	Bronte (C, P)	14	12	1	1	49	8	+41	25	Promotion to the Premier Division
2	Sheffield Wednesday	14	10	2	2	34	8	+26	22	
3	Davies Argyle	13	9	1	3	27	19	+8	17 (Note: Davies Argyle deducted two points for missing a fixture, away to Sunderland who were awarded the points.)	
4	Wolverhampton	14	5	2	7	23	30	−7	12	
5	Spondon	14	4	3	7	23	31	−8	11	Merged with Notts Rangers to form Stanton Rangers and moved to Premier Division
6	Sunderland	13	4	1	8	18	40	−22	11	
7	Cowgate Kestrels	14	5	0	9	19	20	−1	10	
8	Villa Aztecs	14	1	0	13	8	45	−37	2	

Source: WFA NL
(C) Champions; (P) Promoted

==== Division One South ====
Pos	Team	Pld	W	D	L	GF	GA	GD	Pts	Promotion or relegation
1	Arsenal (C, P)	14	11	3	0	99	11	+88	25	Promotion to the Premier Division
2	Abbeydale Alvechurch	14	11	2	1	58	7	+51	24	Moved to Division One North
3	Hassocks Beacon	14	7	4	3	57	32	+25	18	
4	Town & County	14	7	2	5	52	35	+17	16	
5	Reigate	14	4	3	7	31	34	−3	11	
6	Brighton & Hove Albion	14	4	1	9	22	50	−28	9	
7	Broadbridge Heath	14	4	1	9	20	56	−36	9	
8	Milton Keynes	14	0	0	14	5	119	−114	0	Moved to Division One North

Source: WFA NL
(C) Champions; (P) Promoted

=== WFA Cup ===
==== Final ====
25 April 1992
14:30 BST

Doncaster Belles	4–0	Red Star Southampton
Coultard 38'; Walker 47', 65', 78'	Report

Prenton Park, Birkenhead
Attendance: 250
Referee: M. Scott (Tyne & Wear)

== Notable retirements ==
- John Bailey, left-back who was part of Everton's 1984 FA Cup winning team, retired in January while playing for Bristol City in the Second Division.
- Alan Devonshire, midfielder who was influential in West Ham United's successes between 1976 and 1990, retired at the end of the season after completing his career with a two-season spell at Watford.
- Brian Talbot, 38-year-old former Arsenal and England midfielder, played his final league game as player-manager of Aldershot in the autumn.
- Dave Bennett, FA Cup winner with Coventry City in 1987 and runner-up with Manchester City in 1981, retired from professional football after breaking his leg while on loan at Shrewsbury Town from Swindon Town, although he returned to playing at non-league with Nuneaton Borough.

== Diary of the season ==
3 July 1991 – After a year in Spain with Real Sociedad, former Sheffield Wednesday striker Dalian Atkinson returns to England in a £1.6million move to Aston Villa. Mike Milligan ends his year-long spell at Everton and returns to Oldham Athletic for £600,000.

8 July 1991 – Chelsea pay Celtic £1.4million for defender Paul Elliott.

9 July 1991 – Leeds United sign striker Rod Wallace from Southampton for £1.6million and defender Tony Dorigo from Chelsea for £1.3million.

10 July 1991 – Lennie Lawrence ends nine years as manager of Charlton Athletic to become the new manager of Middlesbrough in place of Colin Todd. Charlton in turn announce that coaches Alan Curbishley and Steve Gritt will replace Lawrence as a co-managerial team. Everton striker Graeme Sharp ends 11 years at the club to sign for Oldham Athletic in a £500,000 deal, with Paul Warhurst heading out of Boundary Park in a £750,000 move to Sheffield Wednesday.

11 July 1991 – Former Liverpool striker John Aldridge returns to England in a £250,000 move to Tranmere Rovers, becoming their record signing after spending two years in Spain with Real Sociedad.

12 July 1991 – Ron Atkinson looks to the future when he signs 18-year-old defender Ugo Ehiogu for Aston Villa from West Bromwich Albion for £40,000. Former Tottenham Hotspur manager Peter Shreeves leaves Watford to return to White Hart Lane as a coach, having worked at Vicarage Road on the coaching staff of former Tottenham player Steve Perryman.

15 July 1991 – Mark Wright moves from Derby County to Liverpool for £2.2million. Denmark goalkeeper Peter Schmeichel joins Manchester United for £550,000.

19 July 1991 – Liverpool break the national transfer record by paying Derby County £2.9million for striker Dean Saunders.

20 July 1991 – Aston Villa sell David Platt to A.S. Bari of Italy for £6.5million – the most expensive fee for a British player, and more than double the latest record paid by a British club.

23 July 1991 – Nottingham Forest pay a club record £2million for Millwall striker Teddy Sheringham, who was the Football League's top goalscorer last season. Amstrad computer tycoon Alan Sugar joins forces with Tottenham Hotspur manager Terry Venables to take the club over; Venables becomes chief executive and hands over management of the first team to Peter Shreeves, who only returned to the club as a coach eleven days ago.

25 July 1991 – 37-year-old midfielder Jimmy Case moves from Southampton on a free transfer to AFC Bournemouth, who sell defender Shaun Teale to Aston Villa for £300,000. Second Division Middlesbrough sign striker Paul Wilkinson from Watford for £500,000.

26 July 1991 – Joe Royle further boosts Oldham Athletic's squad, ready for their first top flight season in almost 70 years, with a £400,000 move for Coventry City captain Brian Kilcline.

30 July 1991 – The Football Association wins High Court approval, ahead of the Football League, to launch the new Premier League from next season.

31 July 1991 – Coventry City pay £130,000 for 22-year-old striker Paul Furlong from Isthmian League side Enfield.

1 August 1991 – Liverpool sell Peter Beardsley to Everton for £1million. Tottenham Hotspur defender Mitchell Thomas moves to West Ham for £500,000, and announce that injured midfielder Paul Gascoigne is set to move to Italian club Lazio at the end of the season.

6 August 1991 – Keith Curle becomes the most expensive defender in Britain when he joins Manchester City from Wimbledon for £2.5million. Kevin Richardson becomes the third player to leave Real Sociedad for an English club this summer when he is sold to Aston Villa for £450,000.

7 August 1991 – Liverpool sell Steve Staunton to Aston Villa for £1.1million. Terry Cooper resigns as manager of Third Division club Exeter City and is replaced by Alan Ball.

9 August 1991 – Within 48 hours of leaving Exeter City, Terry Cooper is named as the new Birmingham City manager.

10 August 1991 – League champions Arsenal and FA Cup winners Tottenham Hotspur share the FA Charity Shield with a goalless draw at Wembley.

13 August 1991 – Mark Walters follows his former Rangers manager Graeme Souness to Liverpool in a £1.25million deal. Don Howe's brief return to Wimbledon's coaching staff ends when he announces his decision to leave the club with immediate effect, in response to manager Ray Harford's decision to resign from the club within the next six months. West Ham United prepare for their First Division comeback by signing striker Mike Small from Brighton & Hove Albion for £400,000.

15 August 1991 – Sheffield Wednesday pay a club record £1.2million for Rangers and England goalkeeper Chris Woods, while Liverpool sell defender Gary Gillespie to Celtic for £925,000 and Everton's Stuart McCall heads to Rangers for £1.2million. England winger Trevor Steven, formerly of Everton, moves to the French league champions Marseille, where he will play alongside fellow England international Chris Waddle, for £5million.

16 August 1991 – Tottenham Hotspur pay a club record £2.2million for Chelsea and Scotland striker Gordon Durie, while Coventry City pay a tiny fraction of that fee when signing Zimbabwean striker Peter Ndlovu from Highlanders for £10,000.

17 August 1991 – The Football League season begins. Arsenal begin their defence of the First Division title with a 1–1 home draw against Queens Park Rangers. Manchester United beat newly promoted Notts County 2–0 at Old Trafford. The new Aston Villa manager Ron Atkinson begins with a 3–2 away win over his old club Sheffield Wednesday. Tottenham Hotspur's new head coach Peter Shreeves begins his second spell in charge with a 3–2 win at Southampton. Oldham Athletic lose 2–1 to Liverpool at Anfield in their first top flight game for 68 years. Barnet begin their Football League career with a 7–4 home defeat by Crewe Alexandra in the Fourth Division.

19 August 1991 – Cardiff City pay a Fourth Division record fee of £100,000 for Chester City striker Carl Dale.

21 August 1991 – 19-year-old midfielder Steve McManaman scores his first goal for Liverpool in a 2–1 defeat against Manchester City at Maine Road.

22 August 1991 – Charlton Athletic announce that they will stay at Upton Park until at least January owing to delays on the renovation of The Valley, where they last played in September 1985.

28 August 1991 – Leeds United win 4–0 at Southampton in the league, with Gary Speed and Gordon Strachan both scoring twice from midfield.

29 August 1991 – Ian Porterfield boosts the Chelsea midfield with a £575,000 move for Sheffield United's Vinnie Jones.

30 August 1991 – Former Tottenham Hotspur full-back Cyril Knowles dies of cancer aged 47. Three months ago he retired as manager of Hartlepool United shortly after taking them to promotion to the Third Division.

31 August 1991 – August draws to a close with Manchester United top of the First Division with 11 points from their first five games. Liverpool, Manchester City, Nottingham Forest and Tottenham Hotspur occupy the next four places, while winless Sheffield United, Queens Park Rangers and Luton Town occupy the bottom three places in the top flight. Carlton Palmer becomes the unlikely first scorer of a hat-trick in this season's First Division, finding the net three times in a 4–1 home win for Sheffield Wednesday over QPR. Ipswich Town lead the way in the Second Division, with Bristol City second. The playoff zone is occupied by Cambridge United, Tranmere Rovers, Wolverhampton Wanderers and Leicester City. Nottingham Forest sign winger Kingsley Black from Luton Town for £1.5million.

2 September 1991 – Don Mackay becomes the first managerial casualty of the season when he is sacked by Blackburn Rovers after more than four years in charge. Coach Tony Parkes is appointed caretaker manager. Within hours of his dismissal, Graham Carr resigns from Fourth Division side Maidstone United (deep in debt and reportedly at threat of closure in only their third season as a Football League club) after eight months at the helm, with the club's general manager, Bill Williams taking over as first-team manager for the third time in his career.

7 September 1991 – 17-year-old winger Ryan Giggs scores his first league goal of the season in Manchester United's 3–0 home win over Norwich City. A mere 3,231 fans watch Wimbledon's home game against Luton Town – the lowest postwar attendance at a First Division game.

11 September 1991 – A year into his reign as England manager, Graham Taylor sees the national side lose for the first time when they go down 1–0 to a reunified Germany side in a friendly at Wembley.

14 September 1991 – Arsenal beat a Crystal Palace side containing their transfer target Ian Wright 4–1 in the league at Selhurst Park. Kevin Campbell scores twice.

16 September 1991 – Nigel Jemson, the striker whose goal won the League Cup for Nottingham Forest 17 months ago, moves to Sheffield Wednesday for £800,000.

18 September 1991 – Dean Saunders becomes the first player to score four goals in a European game for Liverpool as they defeat Kuusysi Lahti 6–1 at Anfield in the UEFA Cup first round first leg, but John Barnes suffers an achilles injury and is ruled out until the new year. Alan Smith of Arsenal also scores four in a 6–1 European win – at home to Austria Vienna in the European Cup first round first leg.

20 September 1991 – Tottenham Hotspur defender Terry Fenwick, 31, is sentenced to four months in prison for drink-driving.

21 September 1991 – First Division leaders Manchester United beat struggling Luton Town 5–0 at Old Trafford, with Brian McClair and Mark Hughes both scoring twice. Peter Beardsley scores a hat-trick in Everton's 3–0 home win over Coventry, and Gary Lineker scores four goals in Tottenham's 5–3 away win over Wimbledon.

23 September 1991 – Arsenal pay a club record £2.5million for Crystal Palace striker Ian Wright. Palace manager Steve Coppell uses the windfall from the transfer to pay Palace's record fee of £1.8million for Sunderland striker Marco Gabbiadini.

25 September 1981 – Ian Wright scores on his Arsenal debut in a 1–1 draw with Leicester City at Filbert Street in the second round first leg of the League Cup.

28 September 1991 – Ian Wright scores a hat-trick on his league debut for Arsenal in a 4–0 win at Southampton.

30 September 1991 – Manchester United lead the First Division by six points from Leeds United at the end of September. Sheffield United are bottom of the table, with only one league win from eleven games. The Second Division is being led by a thriving Middlesbrough side in their first season under the management of Lennie Lawrence. Ipswich Town occupy second place. Swindon Town, Wolverhampton Wanderers, Leicester City and Cambridge United occupy the playoff zone.

1 October 1991 – Leeds United suffer their first league defeat of the season when they are beaten 1–0 at Selhurst Park by Crystal Palace.

3 October 1991 – John McGrath, the former Preston North End manager, becomes Halifax Town's 23rd manager in 45 years as successor to Jim McCalliog.

4 October 1991 – Liverpool sign 19-year-old Welsh-born right back Rob Jones from Fourth Division Crewe Alexandra for £300,000.

5 October 1991 – Leeds United get their title challenge back on track with a 4–3 home win over struggling Sheffield United, although they are still three points behind leaders Manchester United, who have two games in hand. Steve Hodge and Mel Sterland both score twice. Luton Town's struggles continue when they lose 4–0 at Aston Villa. Sheffield Wednesday move fourth with a 4–1 home win over Crystal Palace. Terry Butcher, at 32 the youngest manager in the league, has got off to a good start to his second season as manager of Coventry City, who occupy fifth place after a 1–0 win at West Ham United.Tony Cottee becomes Everton's second hat-trick scorer of the league campaign, scoring all three goals in a 3–1 home win over Tottenham.

6 October 1991 – Rob Jones makes his debut for Liverpool in a goalless draw with Manchester United at Old Trafford. Mark Hughes is sent off for the hosts and Gary Ablett is sent off for the visitors.

7 October 1991 – In a shock move, Kenny Dalglish, who resigned as Liverpool manager earlier, makes his return to management at second division Blackburn Rovers. A similarly surprising move sees Ray Harford resign as manager of Wimbledon, who are placed eighth in the First Division, to become Dalglish's assistant at Ewood Park.

8 October 1991 – Wimbledon replace Ray Harford with Aston Villa's reserve team coach, Peter Withe. John Impey, who won promotion to the Third Division with Torquay United just weeks after his appointment as manager last season, is sacked after six months in the job after his side lost seven out of eight games in the league. 28-year-old player Wes Saunders is appointed caretaker manager – making him the youngest manager in the Football League. Winger Jimmy Carter moves from Liverpool to Arsenal for £500,000.

12 October 1991 – Kenny Dalglish has a dream start with his new team, Blackburn Rovers, who crush struggling Plymouth Argyle 5–2 and stand fourth in the league. Middlesbrough remain top despite being held to a goalless draw at home by seventh-placed Wolves. Ipswich, second in the table, are held to a 2–2 draw by Brighton at the Goldstone Ground. Cambridge United are third after an impressive 3–0 home win over Sunderland.

16 October 1991 – England beat Turkey 1–0 at Wembley in their penultimate 1992 European Championship qualifying game. Wales lose 4–1 to Germany in a game in which Dean Saunders is sent off and Ryan Giggs, still not 18 until the end of next month, becomes their youngest full international.

17 October 1991 – Everton buy 20-year-old defender Matt Jackson from Luton Town for £600,000.

19 October 1991 – Arsenal's four-match winning run in the league ends with a 1–1 draw against leaders Manchester United at Old Trafford. Second placed Leeds cut the gap at the top to two points with a 4–2 win at Notts County, although Alex Ferguson's men still have a game in hand. Liverpool's relatively short start to the season continues with a 2–2 draw at Chelsea and they still only occupy 10th place, although they have played fewer games than any of the teams above them. Sheffield United remain bottom despite a 4–2 home win over Nottingham Forest, only their second win in the league this season.

21 October 1991 – Fourth Division strugglers York City dismiss manager John Bird after winning just 2 of their first 11 games.

24 October 1991 – Justin Fashanu signs a trial contract with Newcastle United, who are battling against relegation from the Second Division. Kenny Dalglish makes his first signing for Blackburn Rovers, signing defender Alan Wright from Blackpool F.C. for £500,000 – a record fee for a Fourth Division player.

26 October 1991 – The last unbeaten start in the First Division ends when Manchester United lose their 13th game of the season 3–2 at Sheffield Wednesday. They also surrender their leadership of the First Division, which is taken by Leeds United after their 1–0 win over Oldham Athletic – the first time that Leeds have led the English league since they won the league title in Don Revie's last season as manager in 1974. Arsenal keep their hopes of retaining the league title on track with a 2–0 home win over Notts County, who are now just one place above the relegation zone after their fine start to the season gave way to a run of bad results. Manchester City are third in the league and four points off the top of the table after a 3–2 home win over Sheffield United.

29 October 1991 – York City appoint John Ward as their new manager. The club had initially been set to appoint Billy McEwan as successor to John Bird, but a dispute over wages and the personal recommendation of England manager Graham Taylor resulted in outgoing City chairman Michael Sinclair appointing Ward in his last major decision before handing his own role over to Douglas Craig.

31 October 1991 – The Second Division promotion race is still led by Middlesbrough, but second place is now occupied by a Cambridge United side in the hunt for a unique third successive promotion. The play-off zone is occupied by Charlton Athletic, Swindon Town, Ipswich Town and Derby County.

2 November 1991 – Billy Bremner is sacked as manager of Fourth Division strugglers Doncaster Rovers, who are kept off the bottom of the Football League only by an Aldershot side in massive financial turmoil. The club's youth coach, Steve Beaglehole replaces Bremner as manager. Manchester United regain their lead of the First Division with a 2–0 win over Sheffield United, who are still bottom of the table. Leeds are held to a goalless draw by Wimbledon, which means that Alex Ferguson's team are now leading the league by a single point and having a game in hand. Liverpool's erratic form continues with a 2–1 home defeat to Crystal Palace, while Manchester City maintain their title push with a 3–0 away win over struggling Southampton, whose 21-year-old striker Alan Shearer is now being strongly linked with a move to the likes of Manchester United and Liverpool.

4 November 1991 – Bryan Robson announces his retirement from international football after 90 full caps for England since 1980.

5 November 1991 – Benfica, the Portuguese champions, join the race to sign Paul Gascoigne and table a £6million bid for him.

6 November 1991 – Arsenal's European Cup quest is ended by Benfica. Manchester United's defence of the European Cup Winners' Cup ends with defeat by Atlético Madrid.

8 November 1991 – Kenny Dalglish's spending spree at Blackburn Rovers begins with a £700,000 move to bring defender Colin Hendry back to the club from Manchester City.

9 November 1991 – Cambridge United move to the top of the Second Division for the first time in their history after beating Ipswich Town 2–1, putting themselves on course for a unique third successive promotion.

11 November 1991 – Aldershot manager Brian Talbot resigns with the club well adrift at the bottom of the Fourth Division. With the club in no position to pay for a new manager, team captain Ian McDonald is appointed as player-manager for the rest of the season.

12 November 1991 – First Division strugglers Notts County pay a club record £750,000 for Sheffield United striker Tony Agana.

13 November 1991 – England secure qualification for the European Championship Finals by drawing 1–1 with Poland in Poznań.

14 November 1991 – Blackburn Rovers pay a club record £1.1million for Everton striker Mike Newell. The Football Association confirms that the Premier League will open next season with 22 clubs.

16 November 1991 – The Manchester derby ends in a goalless draw at Maine Road. Leeds go top of the First division with a 2–0 home win over QPR. Aston Villa move into fourth place with a 1–0 home win over Notts County.

17 November 1991 – Gary Lineker announces that he will retire from international football after the European Championships. The first top flight Steel City derby for almost a quarter of a century sees Sheffield United beat Sheffield Wednesday 2–0 at Bramall Lane.

18 November 1991 – Everton sign Rangers striker Mo Johnston for £1.5million.

20 November 1991 – Gary Lineker agrees to join Nagoya Grampus Eight of Japan for £1million on a two-year contract at the end of the season.

23 November 1991 – Justin Fashanu signs for Torquay United as manager Wes Saunders looks to boost his side's hopes of Third Division survival. In the First Division, Manchester United regain their lead with a 2–1 home win over West Ham United. Manchester City's title hopes are dented with a 2–2 draw at bottom-of-the-table Luton Town, who have won just two of their first 17 league games.

24 November 1991 – Leeds regain their lead of the First Division with a 4–1 away win over Aston Villa.

26 November 1991 – The first penalty shoot-out in FA Cup history sees Rotherham United eliminate Scunthorpe United after both Fourth Division clubs draw 3–3 in their first round replay.

28 November 1991 – Gordon Cowans leaves Aston Villa for the second time, this time signing for Blackburn Rovers in a £200,000 deal. His place in the Villa midfield is filled by Garry Parker from Nottingham Forest for £650,000.

30 November 1991 – Leeds United remain First Division leaders, with Manchester United still one point behind and with a game in hand. Third-placed Manchester City are eight points adrift of top place. Sheffield United, meanwhile, have climbed away from bottom place, and are now just one place and two points adrift of safety, ahead of Luton Town and Southampton. Cambridge United remain top of the Second Division, with Middlesbrough in second place. Derby County, Blackburn Rovers, Ipswich Town and Leicester City occupy the play-off places. Both of the top two First Division side win today, Leeds beating Everton 1–0 at home at Manchester United beating Crystal Palace 3–1 at Selhurst Park. Down in the Second Division, Cambridge United are still top after three weeks, one point ahead of second placed Middlesbrough and third placed Derby County. Middlesbrough missed the chance to go top with their 2–1 defeat at fourth placed Blackburn. Leicester City have broken into the Second Division playoff zone after a 2–1 win over Derby at the Baseball Ground. Newcastle United, among the pre-season promotion favourites, have made a dismal start to the season and are now 17th in the Second Division, having lost 3–0 at Barnsley.

3 December 1991 – Liverpool suffer a shock fourth round exit from the League Cup to Third Division Peterborough United, who beat them 1–0 at London Road.

4 December 1991 – Ossie Ardiles pays Leicester City £250,000 to bring Irish international striker David Kelly to Newcastle United.

5 December 1991 – Sunderland pay a club record £900,000 for West Bromwich Albion striker Don Goodman.

6 December 1991 – Chelsea sign striker Clive Allen from Manchester City for £250,000.

7 December 1991 – Leeds retain their lead of the First Division with a 2–0 win at Luton, with Manchester United keeping up the pressure with a 4–0 home win over Coventry City, who have slumped to 15th place in the table. Sheffield Wednesday climb into third place with a 3–0 home win over Chelsea. Manchester City's title challenge is fading fast with a 3–1 defeat at Aston Villa. Liverpool's frustrating season continues with a 1–1 draw at Southampton, restricting them to 10th place.

9 December 1991 – Bill Fox, president of the Football League and chairman of Blackburn Rovers, dies after a short illness at the age of 63. Former Manchester United and Arsenal striker Frank Stapleton moves into management as player-manager of Third Division side Bradford City.

11 December 1991 – Millwall receive the go-ahead to relocate to a new 20,000-seat stadium at Bermondsey. Construction work is expected to begin within the next few months and chairman Reg Burr is hoping to have his team playing in their new stadium for the 1993–94 season.

13 December 1991 – Liverpool pay Arsenal £1.5million for midfielder Michael Thomas, the player whose last minute goal deprived them of the league title in 1989.

14 December 1991 – Leeds drop two points in the league when Tottenham hold them to a 1–1 draw at Elland Road. Former Everton player Joe Royle hosts his former club for the first time as Oldham manager, and the newly promoted Latics hold their opponents to a 2–2 draw at Boundary Park. Blackburn go top of the Second Division for the first time this season with a 3–0 home win over Bristol Rovers.

15 December 1991 – In the only Football League action of the day, Manchester United return to the top of the First Division with a 3–1 win over Chelsea at Stamford Bridge.

18 December 1991 – Liverpool climb into fourth place in the league with a 2–1 win over Tottenham at White Hart Lane.

20 December 1991 – Luton Town achieve only their third league win of the season by beating Coventry 1–0 at Kenilworth Road. Southampton, second from bottom in the First Division, manage a 1–1 draw at home to Notts County, who have now fallen into the relegation zone. Newcastle United's woes continue with a 2–0 defeat at Plymouth Argyle, who climb out of the Second Division drop zone.

21 December 1991 – Ian Wright scores all four of Arsenal's goals as they beat Everton 4–2 in the league at Highbury. Chelsea defeat Oldham Athletic by the same scoreline at Stamford Bridge. Liverpool and Manchester City draw 2–2 at Anfield. QPR's upturn continues with a 1–0 at Norwich lifting them four positions into 13th place. Sheffield Wednesday keep up the pressure on the top two with a 2–0 home win over Wimbledon. Down in the Second Division, an exciting encounter at the Goldstone Ground sees Millwall beat Brighton 4–3, with the home side now battling against relegation just months after being in the playoff final and on the brink of the First Division. Wolves are just two points above the relegation zone.

22 December 1991 – Cambridge United miss out on the chance to regain their surprise lead of the Second Division when they are held to a 1–1 draw at Southend United, who occupy an impressive fifth place in the league halfway through their first season in the Second Division.

23 December 1991 – Manchester City pay Liverpool £900,000 for Steve McMahon.

26 December 1991 – Southend United take over at the top of the Second Division in their first season at this level, but within hours are displaced by Blackburn Rovers. In the First Division, Manchester United defeat Oldham Athletic 6–3 at Boundary Park, Leeds United are held 3–3 at home by Southampton, and Arsenal lose 1–0 at struggling Luton Town. Other exciting Boxing Day action includes a 3–1 home win for Aston Villa over West Ham United and Coventry's 3–0 win over Sheffield United at Bramall Lane. In the Second Division, Watford climb clear of the relegation zone with an impressive 4–0 win at Millwall.

28 December 1991 – The Merseyside derby ends in a 1–1 draw at Goodison Park. Luton Town's survival hopes are given a major boost when they beat Chelsea 2–0 at Kenilworth Road. Defending champions Arsenal are now seventh in the league and 15 points behind leaders Manchester United after they lose 1–0 to Manchester City at Maine Road. Notts County move clear of the drop zone with a 3–0 win over West Ham, which pushes the East Londoners into the bottom three. Blackburn fall off the top of the Second Division with a 2–1 defeat at third place Ipswich. Portsmouth close in on the playoff places by beating Middlesbrough 4–0 at Fratton Park. Bottom club Oxford United boost their survival hopes with a 3–0 home win over Sunderland.

29 December 1991 – Manchester United remain top of the First Division with a 1–1 draw at home to their nearest rivals Leeds United, who have now drawn four league games in a row.

30 December 1991 – Denis Smith is sacked after nearly five years at Sunderland. Malcolm Crosby takes over as caretaker manager.

31 December 1991 – The year draws to a close with Manchester United top of the table by two points and with two games in hand over second-placed Leeds United. Their closest challengers, Sheffield Wednesday and Manchester City, are nine points behind the leaders. The relegation zone is occupied by Southampton, West Ham United and Luton Town. In the Second Division, Cambridge United have restored their lead at the top, level on points with Blackburn Rovers, Ipswich Town and Middlesbrough. Southend United and Leicester City, just one point behind them, complete the top six.

1 January 1992 – Manchester United suffer a shock 4–1 home defeat by Queens Park Rangers, with Dennis Bailey scoring a hat-trick. Leeds United overtake them at the top of the First Division with a 3–1 away win over relegation-threatened West Ham United. The Second Division promotion race sees Blackburn regain their lead with a 2–1 home win over Cambridge United, who drop to sixth in the league. Southend maintain their promotion challenge with a 4–0 home win over Newcastle, who are now just one point clear of the drop zone and faced with the prospect of third-tier football for the first time in their history. Wolves continue their climb up the table with a 2–0 win at Grimsby, while Portsmouth's promotion hopes are hit by a 3–2 defeat at Plymouth, whose three points help them stay clear of the drop zone. Gary Lineker receives an OBE and Tom Finney an MBE in the New Year's Honours.

2 January 1992 – Maidstone United manager Bill Williams admits defeat in his attempt to revive the club's fortunes and reverts to his previous position as general manager. Williams' assistant Clive Walker is left with the task of turning things around for the club, who are kept off the foot of the table only by the shockingly awful seasons being experienced by Aldershot and Doncaster Rovers.

4 January 1992 – Arsenal, defending league champions, lose 2–1 at Wrexham, who finished bottom of the Fourth Division last season, in the FA Cup third round. Non-league Farnborough Town hold West Ham United to a 1–1 draw at Upton Park, while Crystal Palace are beaten 1-0 by Leicester City.

6 January 1992 – Terry Butcher, at 33 the youngest manager in the First Division, is sacked by Coventry City and replaced by his 56-year-old assistant Don Howe.

10 January 1992 – Notts County sell Paul Rideout to Rangers for £500,000.

11 January 1992 – Defender Gary Ablett makes the move across Stanley Park to join Everton from Liverpool for £750,000, on the same day that his new club loses 1–0 to Manchester United at Old Trafford, with an Andrei Kanchelskis goal taking Alex Ferguson's team back to the top of the league. Liverpool's improvement continues as a 2–1 home win over Luton Town takes them into third place, sending the visitors back into the relegation zone, while Sheffield United climb out with a 4–2 away win over bottom club Southampton. Coventry draw 2–2 at home with QPR in their first match under the management of Don Howe. Second Division leaders Blackburn beat Bristol City 4–0 at Ewood Park. Brighton keep their survival bid on track with a 3–1 home win over Barnsley. A mid-table clash at Roker Park sees Sunderland beat Millwall 6–2 with Don Goodman scoring a hat-trick. Newcastle have fallen into the relegation zone after being held to a 2–2 draw by Watford at Vicarage Road.

12 January 1992 – Lee Chapman takes Leeds back to the top of the First Division with a hat-trick against his old club Sheffield Wednesday in a 6–1 win at Hillsborough.

14 January 1992 – Holders Tottenham Hotspur are knocked out of the FA Cup by Aston Villa in a third round replay. West Ham United struggle to a 1–0 win in their replay against Farnborough Town.

15 January 1992 – Manchester United defeat Leeds United 1–0 in the FA Cup third round showdown between the leading two teams in the First Division.

18 January 1992 – Leeds United and Manchester United both drop points, with Crystal Palace holding the hosts to a 1–1 draw at Elland Road and Manchester United being held to a 1–1 draw by Notts County at Meadow Lane. Liverpool continue to recover their league form with a 3–2 win over Oldham at Boundary Park. Newcastle's Second Division campaign continues to go from bad to worse with a 4–3 home defeat to Charlton Athletic, who remain firmly in the hunt for a playoff place, as do a resurgent Wolves with a 3–0 home win over Watford.

19 January 1992 – Wimbledon sack Peter Withe after three months as manager and replace him with reserve team manager Joe Kinnear.

22 January 1992 – Bolton Wanderers sign 19-year-old midfielder Jason McAteer from Northern Premier League side Marine. Manchester United regain their lead of the First Division when a Mark Hughes goal gives them a 1–0 home win over Aston Villa.

25 January 1992 – Aston Villa beat Derby County 4–3 in the FA Cup fourth round at the Baseball Ground. Wrexham hold First Division West Ham United to a 2–2 draw at Upton Park.

30 January 1992 – Derby County pay a club record £1.2million for striker Marco Gabbiadini, just four months after he joined Crystal Palace.

31 January 1992 – Manchester United are still top of the First Division as January ends, with a two-point lead over Leeds United and a game in hand. After four straight league wins, Liverpool are third, but remain eight points off top place. Luton Town, Southampton and West Ham United occupy the bottom three places. The Second Division promotion race is being led by Blackburn Rovers, while Southend United's unlikely promotion challenge continues as they occupy second place. Ipswich Town, Middlesbrough, Leicester City and Cambridge United lie in the play-off zone. French striker Eric Cantona rejects the offer of a contract with Sheffield Wednesday after a trial period.

1 February 1992 – Frenchman Eric Cantona agrees to join Leeds United on the same day that his new club return to the top of the First Division with a 3–0 home win over Notts County, while Manchester United are held to a 1–1 draw by Arsenal at Highbury. Chelsea climb into sixth place with a 2–1 win over Liverpool at Anfield. Sheffield United climb into 17th place with a 5–2 win over Nottingham Forest at the City Ground. Blackburn remain top of the Second Division with a 2–1 home win over Swindon Town. Southend remain second with a 1–0 home win over Watford, with Ipswich still level on points with them after beating Millwall 3–2 away from home. Wolves beat Leicester 1–0 at home to move within three points on the playoffs.

4 February 1992 – Wrexham's FA Cup run ends with a 1–0 defeat at home to West Ham United in their fourth round replay. Manchester United sell out-of-favour goalkeeper Jim Leighton, who has played for the first team just once in the last 18 months, to Dundee for £250,000.

5 February 1992 – Swansea City winger Alan Davies, 30, is found dead in his car near his home in South Wales. Davies played for Manchester United in the 1983 FA Cup final, and later played for Newcastle United and Bradford City. Southampton knock Manchester United out of the FA Cup on penalties in a fourth round replay. Teddy Sheringham scores a hat-trick for Nottingham Forest as they beat Crystal Palace 4–2 in the League Cup quarter-final at the City Ground.

6 February 1992 – Newcastle United, second from bottom in the Second Division, sack manager Ossie Ardiles after 11 months in charge and replace him with former striker Kevin Keegan. Eric Cantona signs for Leeds United from Nîmes Olympique in a £900,000 deal after turning down a contract with Sheffield Wednesday.

7 February 1992 – Former Liverpool and England midfielder Terry McDermott is appointed as Kevin Keegan's assistant. Liverpool legend Bob Paisley resigns from the club's board of directors due to ill health, ending a 53-year association with the club.

8 February 1992 – Kevin Keegan starts his managerial career on a high note as Newcastle beat Bristol City 3–0 at home. Arsenal end a seven-match winless run in the league with a 1–0 win at Notts County, but Leeds United's title bid takes a blow when they suffer a 2–0 defeat at Oldham Athletic, with Manchester United's 1–1 home draw with Sheffield Wednesday being enough to keep them on top. Sheffield United's upturn continues with a 4–2 home win over Manchester City. Wimbledon beat Aston Villa 2–0 to ensure that they stay clear of the relegation zone and begin their recovery from dismal mid-season form. Blackburn's 3–2 win over Grimsby at Blundell Park ensures that their remain one point ahead at the top of the Second Division, despite second-placed Ipswich's 5–2 home win over Portsmouth. Swindon climb into fourth place with a 2–1 home win over Brighton. Down in the Third Division, a clash between local rivals sees West Bromwich Albion retain their lead of the table with a 3–0 away win over Birmingham City, who stand fourth in the table during their third season at this level.

9 February 1992 – With the club slipping back into the relegation zone after an initial run of good form under caretaker manager Wes Saunders, Third Division strugglers Torquay United take the bold move of appointing Yugoslav manager Ivan Golac until the end of the season.

13 February 1992 – Second Division strugglers Plymouth Argyle sack manager David Kemp.

15 February 1992 – Nottingham Forest thrash Bristol City 4–1 at the City Ground in the FA Cup fifth round. Chelsea beat Sheffield United 1–0 in a match in which Vinnie Jones is booked inside the first ten seconds of play. In the league, Arsenal keep their fading title hopes alive with a 7–1 home win over fellow outsiders Sheffield Wednesday at Highbury.

19 February 1992 – Alan Shearer scores on his full England debut in a 2-0 friendly win over France at Wembley. Also making his debut are Liverpool's Rob Jones and Everton's Martin Keown.

20 February 1992 – The Football Association confirms that it will launch the new FA Premier League for next season, contested between the 19 highest-placed teams in this season's final First Division table and the champions, runners-up and playoff winners in the Second Division.

21 February 1992 – Aston Villa pay a club record £1.7million for Oldham Athletic defender Earl Barrett.

22 February 1992 – Manchester United open up a four-point lead at the top of the First Division by beating Crystal Palace 2–0 at Old Trafford, with Mark Hughes scoring twice and Peter Schmeichel making a spectacular save from a Simon Rodger shot. Liverpool fall to a 3–0 defeat to Norwich City at Carrow Road.

23 February 1992 – Leeds are held to a 1–1 draw by Everton at Goodison Park, which means they are still three points behind Manchester United, who have a game in hand.

26 February 1992 – In a set of high-scoring FA Cup fifth round replays, Southampton beat Bolton Wanderers 3–2 at The Dell, Sunderland beat West Ham United 3–2 at Upton Park, Liverpool beat Ipswich Town 3–2 at Anfield and Portsmouth beat Middlesbrough 4–2 at Ayresome Park.

28 February 1992 – 20-year-old Australian goalkeeper Mark Bosnich joins Aston Villa after seven months back in his homeland following his departure from Manchester United. He joins Les Sealey, who joined Villa from Old Trafford last summer, at Villa Park. After a loan spell, Norwich City midfielder Tim Sherwood makes his move to Blackburn Rovers permanent for £500,000. The only league action of the day sees Cambridge United beat Bristol Rovers 6–1 in the Second Division at the Abbey Stadium.

29 February 1992 – February ends with Manchester United holding a two-point advantage over second placed Leeds United. Southampton, West Ham United and Luton Town remain in the bottom three. Blackburn Rovers still lead the race for a place in the new Premier League, while Ipswich Town are second . The play-off zone is occupied by Cambridge United, Southend United, Middlesbrough and Derby County. In the Third Division, referee Roger Wiseman is assaulted by a spectator during the Birmingham City–Stoke City promotion clash at St Andrew's, which ends in a 1–1 draw and sees Stoke top the Third Division.

2 March 1992 – Peter Shilton, at 42 the oldest player in the Football League, departs from Derby County after nearly five years to become player-manager of Plymouth Argyle. Birmingham City chairman Samesh Kumar vows to impose life bans on anyone convicted of taking part in the pitch invasion against Stoke City.

4 March 1992 – Welsh international midfielder Joey Jones, who plays for Wrexham at club level and turned out for Liverpool earlier in his career, announces his retirement as a player on his 37th birthday.

7 March 1992 – Nottingham Forest's hopes of a cup double are ended as they are beaten 1–0 by Portsmouth at Fratton Park in the FA Cup sixth round. In the league, Leeds go top of the First Division with a 3–1 win over Tottenham at White Hart Lane, which sends the hosts down to 17th place. Luton climb out of the relegation zone with a 1–1 draw at home to Crystal Palace. QPR beat Manchester City 4–0 at Loftus Road. Wimbledon's resurgence continues with a 2–0 home win over Notts County, who fall into the relegation zone. In the Second Division, Blackburn suffer a shock 3–0 away defeat to Bristol Rovers, allowing Ipswich Town to draw level on points with them by beating Watford 1–0 at Vicarage Road. Oxford climb out of the Second Division relegation zone with a dramatic 5–3 win over local rivals Swindon Town at the Manor Ground.

8 March 1992 – Liverpool's bid for a fifth FA Cup triumph remains on track as they beat Aston Villa 1–0 at Anfield.

9 March 1992 – Caretaker manager Joe Kinnear is placed in charge of Wimbledon on a permanent basis.

10 March 1992 – Sunderland hold Chelsea to a 1–1 draw at Stamford Bridge in the FA Cup sixth round. In the top-flight, Arsenal beat Oldham 2–1 while Steve Cherry is Notts' hero at home to Villa: the County custodian saves Steve Staunton's penalty kick in a goalless draw that sees the Nottingham club pull out of the bottom three. In Second Division action, league leaders Blackburn Rovers draw 2–2 with play-off hopefuls Southend United, while Newcastle United win away at high-flying Cambridge United.

11 March 1992 – Queens Park Rangers inflict another 4–1 defeat on a title-chasing side, this time Leeds United at Loftus Road. Derby County spend £1.3million on Leicester City striker Paul Kitson, while Manchester City sign Dutch defender Michel Vonk from HVV for £500,000.

12 March 1992 – Derby County spend another £1.3million on another striker – Tommy Johnson from Notts County – while Arsenal sell 20-year-old striker Andy Cole to Bristol City for £500,000 after a loan spell.

14 March 1992 – Lee Chapman scores his second hat-trick in just months as Leeds win 5–1 at home to Wimbledon, with Eric Cantona scoring twice to keep the leaders on top. Manchester United beat Sheffield United 2–1 at Bramall Lane, but are two points behind the leaders and have three games in hand. Luton keep out of the drop zone by holding Everton to a 1–1 draw at Goodison Park. Oldham head closer to securing a place in the new Premier League with a 4–3 home win over Notts County, who remain in the drop zone when a victory would have lifted them out of it. Sheffield Wednesday keep their faint title hopes alive with a 2–0 away win over Tottenham, who now occupy a dismal 18th place in the league and are just five points clear of the relegation zone. West Ham remain bottom after losing 2–0 at home to Arsenal. Blackburn remain top of the Second Division with a 3–0 win over Brighton at the Goldstone Ground, while Newcastle take a big step towards survival with a 3–1 home win over second-placed Ipswich. Cambridge United keep their automatic promotions hopes alive with a 2–1 win over Bristol City at Ashton Gate. Portsmouth keep on track for a playoff place with a 6–1 home win over Millwall.

15 March 1992 – The only league action of the day sees Southampton climb out the drop zone by beating Manchester City 1–0 at Maine Road, with Iain Dowie scoring the only goal of the game.

18 March 1992 – The FA Cup quarter-final replays see Norwich City beat Southampton 2–1 and Sunderland beat Chelsea 2–1. Bruce Rioch resigns after two years as Millwall manager to be replaced in the manager's seat by 35-year-old defender Mick McCarthy. In the Fourth Division, bottom club Aldershot are wound up in the High Court with debts in excess of £1million, but are given seven days to appeal against the verdict and have been allowed to continue in the Football League. Liverpool's UEFA Cup run ends in a 4–0 aggregate semi-final defeat by Genoa of Italy, who beat them 2–0 in both legs.

20 March 1992 – Derby County break their transfer record again by signing Notts County striker Tommy Johnson for £1.3million after a loan spell.

21 March 1992 – Chelsea player Vinnie Jones sets a Football League record by receiving a yellow card after only three seconds of the game against Sheffield United. The game ends in a 2–1 win for the Blades at Stamford Bridge. Tottenham are now 19th in the First Division after a 2–1 defeat to Liverpool at Anfield, although they are four points clear of 20th-placed Luton and have three games in hand. The bottom three of Luton, Notts County and West Ham all drop points. Darren Beckford scores a hat-trick for Norwich in a 4–3 win over Everton at Carrow Road. Blackburn remain top of the Second Division despite a 2–0 home defeat at home to Charlton Athletic, who climb three places to fifth. Middlesbrough's promotion hopes are boosted by a 4–0 home win over Brighton, who are still in the relegation zone.

22 March 1992 – In the only league action of the day, leaders Leeds draw 1–1 with Arsenal at Highbury. They currently have a two-point lead over Manchester United, but their nearest rivals still have two games in hand.

23 March 1992 – Kenny Dalglish takes his Blackburn Rovers spending to £5million in five months with a £750,000 move for Swindon Town striker Duncan Shearer.

25 March 1992 – Aldershot go out of business and are forced to resign from the Football League. Their resignation disrupts the League's plans to expand to 94 clubs for the following season, and it is announced that rather than promoting a second club from the Football Conference (or relegating the bottom-placed Fourth Division club to restore the League to 92 members), the following two seasons will proceed with a 93-club Football League, with further discussions on league reconstruction to take place for the 1994–95 season. Aldershot's resignation seemingly condemns Doncaster Rovers to the humiliation of finishing in bottom place, as they are now nine points adrift of second-bottom Carlisle United.

27 March 1992 – Clive Allen's three-month spell at Chelsea ends with a £275,000 move to relegation-threatened West Ham United.

28 March 1992 – Leeds drop two vital points when they are a held to a goalless draw by bottom club West Ham at Elland Road, but Manchester United also drop points when they are held to a goalless draw at QPR. Gordon Durie scores a hat-trick for Tottenham in their 4–3 home win over Coventry. West Ham are now eight points adrift of safety with nine games left to play. Notts County's survival hopes suffer a major blow with a 3–2 home defeat to Crystal Palace. Blackburn surrender their lead of the Second Division with a 2–1 defeat at Barnsley, with Ipswich going top as they beat Derby County 2–1.

29 March 1992 – Newcastle United's Second Division survival bid is given a major boost when they beat local rivals Sunderland 1–0 at home. In the last-ever Full Members Cup final, Nottingham Forest beat Southampton 3-2 after extra time at Wembley, but lose defender Stuart Pearce for the rest of the season with a knee injury.

31 March 1992 – The month ends with Manchester United still top of the league, now one point ahead of Leeds United and with a game in hand after two Paul Ince goals help them beat Norwich City 3–1 at Carrow Road. Luton Town and West Ham United remain in the relegation zone, and have been joined by Notts County. Four successive wins in March have seen Southampton move five points clear of danger. Ipswich Town have displaced Blackburn Rovers at the top of the Second Division, with the play-off zone occupied by Cambridge United, Middlesbrough, Leicester City and Charlton Athletic. Liverpool maintain fourth place in the First Division with a 4–0 home win over Notts County, who are now six points adrift of safety and having play more games than all the other teams in the bottom seven.

1 April 1992 – Southampton make it five league wins in a row by beating Everton 1–0 at Goodison Park. West Ham are now 11 points adrift of safety after losing 3–0 to Tottenham at White Hart Lane, with Gary Lineker scoring a hat-trick. A Second Division promotion crunch game at Filbert Street sees Leicester beat Middlesbrough 2–1.

2 April 1992 – Wimbledon beat Nottingham Forest 3–0 at Selhurst Park, meaning that they now only need five points from their final six games to be sure of survival and a place in the Premier League.

3 April 1992 – Northampton Town go into receivership with debts of £1million; the club's administrators sack manager Theo Foley.

4 April 1992 – Leeds United's title challenge suffers another blow as they lose 4–0 to Manchester City at Maine Road. Luton keep their survival hopes alive with a 2–1 home win over Wimbledon, cutting the gap between themselves and 19th-placed Coventry to five points. Aston Villa manage an impressive 5–2 away win over Tottenham. West Ham are pushed closer to relegation with a 2–1 defeat at Chelsea. Southampton beat QPR 2–1 to make it six league wins a row. Cambridge move back into the Second Division automatic promotion places at the expense of Blackburn by beating Millwall 1–0 at home.

5 April 1992 – Sunderland beat Norwich City 1–0 to reach their first FA Cup final since 1973, while Portsmouth draw 1–1 after extra time with Liverpool, whose manager Graeme Souness is rushed to hospital just hours after the game to undergo an emergency heart operation.

7 April 1992 – Ryan Giggs scores against Manchester City in the Manchester derby at Old Trafford for the second season running, but this time United fail to take all the points as their neighbours hold them to a 1–1 draw. With six games left to play, United now have a two-point lead over Leeds and a game in hand. Notts County slide closer to relegation with a 2–0 home defeat to Tottenham.

8 April 1992 – Sheffield Wednesday's title bid is effectively ended when they are held to a goalless draw at Coventry, whose two dropped points are a gift to 20th-placed Luton, who are now six points adrift of Don Howe's team and have a game in hand. Wimbledon climb four places to 10th with a 3–2 win over Liverpool at Anfield, Arsenal win 3–1 over Norwich at Carrow Road, and Southampton's six-match winning run ends with a 1–0 home defeat to Nottingham Forest. Leicester reach fifth place in the race for places in the new Premier League by beating Sunderland 3–2 at Filbert Street – a result which leaves the FA Cup finalists on the brink of the relegation zone, although they have games in hand over all of the bottom three teams.

11 April 1992 – Paul Merson scores a hat-trick in Arsenal's 4–1 home win over Crystal Palace. Leeds United beat Chelsea 3–0 to move one point ahead of Manchester United at the top of the league, although Alex Ferguson's men still have two games in hand. Notts County beat Coventry 1–0 to keep their survival hopes alive, but still need at least seven points from their final four games to stand any chance of avoiding relegation. West Ham beat Norwich 4–0 at Upton Park to give themselves fresh hope of survival, they are still nine points adrift to safety with six games left to play but have two games in hand over 19th-placed Coventry. Luton failed to take advantage of Coventry's latest defeat, crashing to a 5–1 defeat at Oldham in which Graeme Sharp scored four goals. At the top of the Second Division, Ipswich beat Newcastle 3–2 at Portman Road and will guarantee their place in the new Premier League if they pick up as little as five points from their last five games. Cambridge hold on to second place despite a 2–1 defeat at Wolves. Leicester keep their automatic promotion hopes alive with a 3–1 home win over Barnsley. Blackburn's dismal run of form continues as they lose 2–1 at Watford.

12 April 1992 – Manchester United defeat Nottingham Forest 1–0 in the League Cup final thanks to a Brian McClair goal in the first half.

13 April 1992 – Liverpool defeat Portsmouth on penalties after their FA Cup semi-final replay ends in a goalless draw.

14 April 1992 – Luton are now just three points adrift of safety after beating Nottingham Forest 2–1 at Kenilworth Road. Sheffield United peak in eighth place with a 2–0 win over Tottenham at Bramall Lane. West Ham lose 1–0 at home to Southampton, who are now almost certainly safe from relegation, but West Ham are left needing at least nine points from their final four games to stand any chance of avoiding relegation.

15 April 1992 – On the third anniversary of the Hillsborough disaster, Graeme Souness sparks outrage when he gives an exclusive front page interview with The Sun newspaper, which is still reviled on Merseyside following its controversial reporting of the tragedy in which 95 Liverpool fans died, celebrating his recovery from heart surgery and Liverpool's victory in the FA Cup semi-final. On the Football League scene, there is no action in the First Division but Middlesbrough clinch three vital points in the Second Division promotion race with a 2–1 win over Oxford United and Derby win 2–1 at Brighton, with both results impacting on the promotion and relegation issues.

16 April 1992 – Manchester United return to the top of the First Division when an Andrei Kanchelskis goal gives them a 1–0 home win over Southampton and a two-point lead over Leeds, with the advantage of a game in hand.

17 April 1992 – Cambridge United squander the chance of bouncing back into the Second Division automatic promotion places when they are held to a 2–2 draw at home to Portsmouth, whose own playoff push takes a major blow by the failure to win the game.

18 April 1992 – Liverpool hold Leeds United to a goalless draw at Anfield. Manchester United fail to take advantage as they can only manage a 1–1 draw at Luton Town, but remain two points clear at the top with a game in hand. The point equally was crucial for Luton, who are now just two points adrift of safety due to Coventry's 1–0 defeat at home to Everton. Sheffield Wednesday win 1–0 at Southampton and are still in with a faint chance of winning the league title just one season after promotion. Notts County claw back to being four points adrift of safety with a 1–0 win at Norwich, who suddenly find themselves in danger of relegation after a recent slump in league form.

19 April 1992 – Defender Mick McCarthy becomes player-manager of Millwall following the sacking of Bruce Rioch.

20 April 1992 – Ian Wright scores twice as Arsenal beat Liverpool 4–0 at Highbury. Leeds United are one point ahead of Manchester United, who have a game in hand, after a 2–0 home win over relegation threatened Coventry City, while Alex Ferguson's team lose 2–1 at home to Nottingham Forest. Sheffield Wednesday maintain their slim chance of snatching the title by recording a third straight victory, and are now just three points off top spot. West Ham's relegation is almost certain following a 2–0 home defeat to Crystal Palace, meaning that they will have to win their final three games of the season and hope that Coventry lose their remaining three games to survive even on goal difference. Luton squander their chance to climb out of the drop zone with a 2–1 defeat at QPR, while Notts County's 3–1 defeat at home to Sheffield United leaves them needing to win both of their remaining games to stand any chance of survival. In the Second Division, Newcastle have fallen back into the relegation zone and their 4–1 defeat at Derby is a big boost for their hosts in the push for promotion.

21 April 1992 – Businessman Max Griggs forms a new team, Rushden & Diamonds, from a merger of Rushden Town and Irthlingborough Diamonds, to play in the Midland Division of the Southern League next season. In the Second Division, Ipswich's promotion celebrations are put on hold when they are held to a goalless draw at home by Grimsby, but their now just need a single point from their final two games to guarantee promotion. Leicester's automatic promotion hopes are given a major boost by a 2–1 home win over Cambridge, which ends John Beck's team's hopes of automatic promotion, although they remain in the playoff places and in contention for a unique third successive promotion. Charlton edge Blackburn out of the playoff places on goal difference with a 1–1 draw at Port Vale, who would have climbed out of the relegation zone with a victory.

22 April 1992 – Manchester United's title hopes are left hanging by a thread when they lose 1–0 to West Ham United at Upton Park. They remain one point behind leaders Leeds United with two games remaining. The victory also delays West Ham's almost certain relegation.

25 April 1992 – Newly promoted clubs West Ham United and Notts County are both relegated from the First Division. County's relegation is confirmed by a 2–0 defeat to Manchester City at Maine Road, and West Ham are beaten 1–0 at Coventry, who stay out of the relegation zone despite Luton's 2–0 win over Aston Villa. Sheffield Wednesday miss the chance to go level with Leeds United at the top as they draw 1–1 with Crystal Palace. Ipswich become the first team to win promotion to the new Premier League when they draw 1–1 at Oxford United, which also seals them the Second Division title. Leicester would have gone into their final game needing just a point to achieve promotion had they managed to win at Charlton, but found themselves on the receiving end of a 2–0 defeat and also face the prospect of being pipped to automatic promotion by their local rivals Derby, who won 2–1 at Bristol City. Blackburn beat Millwall 2–1 at Ewood Park but remain one place outside the playoff places due to Charlton's win. Middlesbrough beat Bristol Rovers 2–1 at Ayresome Park and will go into their final game of the season in the automatic places on goal difference if they win their game in hand. Port Vale's 4–2 defeat at Cambridge leaves them needing to win their final game to stand any chance of survival.

26 April 1992 – Leeds United are confirmed as league champions for the first time in eighteen years, and just two years after winning promotion, thanks to a 3–2 win over Sheffield United and Manchester United's 2–0 defeat at Liverpool immediately afterwards.

27 April 1992 – FA Cup finalists Sunderland secure their Second Division survival with a goalless draw over Swindon at Roker Park.

28 April 1992 – After guiding Sunderland to the FA Cup final and Second Division survival, Malcolm Crosby receives the manager's job on a permanent basis. Middlesbrough move into second place in the Second Division with a 2–0 home win over Grimsby. Charlton lose 1–0 at home to Tranmere to give Blackburn the advantage of their game in hand in the race for a playoff place.

29 April 1992 – Blackburn climb back into the top six of the Second Division on goal difference with a 2–2 draw over Sunderland at Ewood Park. Brighton keep their survival hopes alive with a 2–1 home win over Portsmouth, whose playoff hopes are ended as a result.

30 April 1992 – Ipswich Town have sealed promotion to the new Premier League as Second Division champions, ending six years outside the top flight. Leicester City now occupy the second automatic promotion place, but face competition from Derby County and Middlesbrough. Cambridge United and Charlton Athletic complete the top six.

1 May 1992 – Dave Stringer resigns as manager of Norwich City after five seasons, with coach David Williams being put in temporary charge for the club's final game of the season.

2 May 1992 – Leeds United finish their title winning campaign with a 1–0 home win over Norwich City. Manchester United finish second after beating Tottenham Hotspur 3–1, with Gary Lineker scoring a consolation goal for the North London side to finish the season with 28 league goals. It is the last game to be played in front of the Stretford End terrace before it is replaced by an all-seater stand. Arsenal's Ian Wright leapfrogs Lineker as the First Division's top scorer, with 29 goals, by scoring a hat-trick against Southampton in a 5–1 win at Highbury, in the last game to be played in front of the existing North Bank. Luton Town's final game of the season ends in defeat by relegated Notts County, ending their 10-year stay in the top flight. Coventry City survive by two points despite losing to Aston Villa. In his final game for West Ham United, Frank McAvennie scores a hat-trick for the relegated East London side in their 3–0 home win over Nottingham Forest.David White scores a hat-trick for Manchester City in their 5–2 away win over Oldham. Liverpool finish sixth in the league – their lowest final position for 27 years – but maintain their record of finishing in the top eight every season since winning promotion in 1962. Middlesbrough clinch the second promotion place in the Second Division, winning 2–1 at Wolves. Newcastle achieve survival with a 2–1 at Leicester, who along with their local rivals Derby qualify for the playoffs. Cambridge's hopes of a unique third successive promotion remain alive as they qualify for the playoffs by finishing fifth. Blackburn seal the final playoff place with a 3–1 at Plymouth, who are relegated after six seasons in the Second Division. Oxford's survival is ensured by a 2–1 away win over Tranmere at Prenton Park, while Brighton are sent down by a 3–1 defeat at champions Ipswich and Port Vale go down in bottom place after losing 1–0 at home to Grimsby.

3 May 1992 – Gordon Strachan announces his retirement from international action with Scotland.

5 May 1992 – It is announced that England will host the 1996 UEFA European Football Championships. Bobby Gould is sacked as manager of West Bromwich Albion after they just missed out on the Third Division play-offs in their first season at this level.

7 May 1992 – Defender Des Walker moves from Nottingham Forest to Sampdoria of Italy for £1.5million.

8 May 1992 – Phil Neal, the former Liverpool captain, is sacked after more than six years as manager of Bolton Wanderers. Neal, 41, oversaw Bolton's relegation to the Fourth Division in 1987 but won them promotion after just one season, and last season he took them to the brink of promotion to the Second Division. However, he could only manage them to 13th place in this season's Third Division. Two more Third Division clubs make managerial appointments on the same day, as Ossie Ardiles returns to management with West Bromwich Albion, and Ivan Golac steps down as Torquay United manager after failing to keep them in the division. With Wes Saunders declining the chance to return to the Torquay manager's job on a permanent basis, the club appoint another senior player, Paul Compton as manager.

9 May 1992 – Liverpool lift the FA Cup for the fifth time in their history thanks to a 2–0 win over Sunderland at Wembley. The goals come from Michael Thomas and Ian Rush, who scores for a record fifth time in the final.

10 May 1992 – Mike Masters becomes the first American to score at Wembley, doing so for Colchester United in the F.A Trophy Final.

11 May 1992 – Former England manager Bobby Robson ends two years with PSV Eindhoven in the Netherlands to manage Sporting CP of Portugal.

15 May 1992 – Rob Jones pulls out of contention for a place in England's European Championship squad due to a shin splints injury. Peter Shreeves is dismissed as team manager of Tottenham Hotspur after one disappointing season back at the helm.

18 May 1992 – Graham Taylor announces England's 20-man squad for the European Championships.

19 May 1992 – Portsmouth accept a £700,000 offer from Liverpool for defender John Beresford.

21 May 1992 – Having secured Newcastle's survival in the Second Division, Kevin Keegan signs a three-year contract to become manager on a permanent basis.

23 May 1992 – Aldershot Town are formed in place of the bankrupt Aldershot FC, and are applying for a place in next season's Isthmian League Third Division. Blackpool become the second team to win promotion (Torquay United beating Blackpool 5v4 on 31st May 1991 - previous season) on penalties when they defeat Scunthorpe United 4–3 on penalties after a 1–1 draw in the Fourth Division playoff final.

24 May 1992 – Peterborough United win the Third Division playoff final with a 2–1 win over Stockport County to become founder members of the new Division One and reach the second tier of the English league for the first time in their 32 years as a Football League side.

25 May 1992 – Blackburn Rovers return to the top flight of English football after a 26-year exile after beating Leicester City in the Second Division playoff final. The only goal of the game is a penalty by former Leicester striker Mike Newell. Lee Dixon becomes the second right-back to pull out of the England squad, causing Graham Taylor to call upon the Rangers defender Gary Stevens.

27 May 1992 – Bobby Gould is appointed joint manager of Coventry City alongside Don Howe, who was his assistant when he managed Wimbledon to FA Cup glory in 1988. Derby County, who missed out on a place in the new Premier League after defeat in the playoffs, prepare for another promotion push by signing midfielder Mark Pembridge from Luton Town for £1.25million. Tottenham Hotspur announce that Doug Livermore will be taking charge of the first team from next season with Ray Clemence as his assistant, while chief executive Terry Venables will be involved in the coaching side of the club again.

29 May 1992 – Bruce Rioch returns to football as manager of Bolton Wanderers.

1 June 1992 – Tottenham Hotspur sign 19-year-old winger Darren Anderton from Portsmouth for £1.7million. Mike Walker is promoted from reserve team manager to succeed Dave Stringer as manager of Norwich City.

2 June 1992 – Demolition work begins on Manchester United's famous Stretford End, to make way for an all-seater replacement which will cost £12million to build and be completed next year.

3 June 1992 – England lose a third right-back when Gary Stevens suffers a stress fracture in a 2–1 friendly win over Finland in Helsinki. Their left winger John Barnes ruptures his Achilles tendon and is also ruled out of the European Championships.

5 June 1992 – England are given special permission to make additions to their European Championship squad after the official deadline, selecting Manchester City defender Keith Curle and QPR winger Andy Sinton as late additions to his squad.

9 June 1992 – England midfielder David Platt leaves Bari after one year and agrees to join their Italian league rivals Juventus for £6.5million. Harry Redknapp ends eight years as manager of Bournemouth and is succeeded by Tony Pulis. Aston Villa assistant manager Andy Gray resigns from the position to become a full-time pundit for Sky Sports in their coverage of the new Premier League.

10 June 1992 – More than a year after first trying to sign him, Lazio finally sign Paul Gascoigne from Tottenham Hotspur for a fee of £6.5million – a record sale for an English club and the joint highest fee for an English player following David Platt's transfer between two Italian clubs yesterday.

11 June 1992 – England begin their European Championship campaign with a goalless draw with Denmark in Malmö.

12 June 1992 – England are refused permission to make a further addition to their European Championship squad, after Mark Wright was ruled out by injury and manager Graham Taylor had wanted to select Tony Adams in his place.

14 June 1992 – England draw 0–0 with France in their second European Championship group game.

16 June 1992 – Kevin Keegan continues to plot Newcastle United's revival bid by signing midfielder Paul Bracewell from Sunderland for £250,000.

17 June 1992 – Despite taking an early lead thanks to David Platt, England bow out of the European Championships after two second-half goals put them 2–1 down to Sweden in Stockholm.

21 June 1992 – Chris Waddle rejects an offer to join Leeds United from Olympique Marseille. He is now expected to join Sheffield Wednesday for £900,000.

24 June 1992 – Don Howe resigns as joint manager of Coventry City, leaving Bobby Gould in sole charge.

== Retirements ==
- Alan Devonshire, Watford winger who spent most of his career at West Ham United and was capped eight times by England.
- Brian Talbot, former Arsenal and England midfielder, retired from professional football on his resignation as Aldershot's player-manager in November 1991.

== Deaths ==
- 12 July 1991 – Joe Robinson, 72, kept goal for Blackpool in the 1948 FA Cup Final defeat by Manchester United.
- 15 August 1991 – Ken Gunn, 82, played at wing-half for Swansea Town, Port Vale and Northampton in the 1930s.
- 18 August 1991 – Les McDowall, 78, played 117 league games and scored eight goals at wing-half for Manchester City between 1937 and 1949, having started his career at Sunderland. His career was disrupted by World War II. He then managed City for 13 years from 1950 to 1963, guiding them to FA Cup glory in 1956.
- 30 August 1991 – Cyril Knowles, 47, who played at left back for Tottenham and England during the late 1960s and early 1970s, died of brain cancer. Achieved Fourth Division promotion success with Darlington in 1985 and Hartlepool United in 1991.
- 27 September 1991 – Joe Hulme, 87, was a right-winger for Arsenal in Herbert Chapman's great interwar team. After the war, he was the manager of Tottenham Hotspur for four years.
- 29 September 1991 – Gordon Clayton, 51, who kept goal for Manchester United twice in the late 1950s, had only been appointed assistant manager of GM Vauxhall Conference side Northwich Victoria a few weeks before his sudden death.
- 5 November 1991 – Robert Maxwell, 68, Former Chairman of Oxford United & Derby County & Media Proprietor. Died after presumably falling overboard his luxury Yacht Lady Ghislaine.
- 12 November 1991 – Billy Behan, 80, made a solitary appearance in goal for Manchester United in the Second Division in March 1934. He spent most of his playing career in his native Ireland, where he later spent many years working as a referee.
- 19 November 1991 – Jackie Stamps, 72, scored 100 league goals for Derby County between 1939 and 1950 and scored twice in their 1946 FA Cup Final triumph, being prevented from enjoying more success at the club due to World War II.
- 4 December 1991 – Cliff Bastin, 79, played centre-forward during Arsenal's successful pre Second World War side and set a goalscoring record for the club which would be unbroken for some 60 years. Had played for Exeter City early in his career and a new stand at the club's St James Park ground was named after him.
- 1 January 1992 – Jack Badham, 72, played 175 league games as a left-back or left-half for Birmingham City between 1946 and 1957.
- 13 January 1992 – Mick Leach, 44, who died of cancer, played more than 300 games for Queens Park Rangers between 1965 and 1979. He helped them achieve their highest-ever league finish when they finished runners-up in the league title race at the end of the 1975–76 season, and continued at the club for the next three seasons before finishing his career with Cambridge United.
- 15 January 1992 – John Beattie, 79, played 278 games in the English and Scottish leagues, starting out in his native Scotland at Aberdeen in 1931 before turning out for Wolverhampton Wanderers, Blackburn Rovers, Birmingham City, Huddersfield Town and Grimsby Town, his senior career being effectively ended by World War II.
- 4 February 1992 – Alan Davies, 30, who played on the left wing for Manchester United in their 1983 FA Cup triumph, was found dead in his car in South Wales. He had committed suicide. At the time of his death, Davies was employed by Swansea City and his other clubs had included Newcastle United and Bradford City.
- 29 February 1992 – Willie Fagan, 75, began his playing career in his native Scotland with Celtic before moving south of the border to Preston in 1936, moving to Liverpool a year later and making 158 league appearances as a forward, scoring 47 goals, before ending his senior career at Anfield in 1952. He collected a league title winner's medal with Liverpool in 1947 but was prevented from enjoying more success on Merseyside due to his career being disrupted by World War II.
- 2 March 1992 – Jackie Mudie, 61, was capped 17 times for Scotland in the 1950s, scoring nine goals from centre-forward, but spent his whole senior playing career in England, including a 14-year spell at Blackpool beginning in 1947 which yielded 144 league goals and an FA Cup winner's medal in 1953. On leaving Bloomfield Road in 1961, he signed for Stoke City and finally retired as a player at Port Vale in 1967, where he had been joint manager alongside Stanley Matthews for two years. He died after a two-year battle against cancer.
- 18 March 1992 – Jack Kelsey, 63, kept goal for Arsenal and Wales during the postwar years and played until his career was ended by a back injury suffered against Brazil in 1962.
- April 1992 – Tommy Wilson, 61, scored for Nottingham Forest in their second FA Cup victory – when they beat Luton Town in the 1959 final at Wembley.
- 25 May 1992 – Daniel Yorath, 15, son of Wales manager Terry, collapsed and died as a result of a rare heart condition, just after joining the Leeds United youth team.
