= 1990–91 West Ham United F.C. season =

English football team season

West Ham United
1990–91 season
- Chairman: Martin Cearns
- Manager: Billy Bonds
- Stadium: Boleyn Ground
- Second Division: 2nd (promoted)
- FA Cup: Semi-finals
- League Cup: Third round
- Top goalscorer: League: Trevor Morley (12); All: Morley (17)
- Highest home attendance: 26,551 (v Notts County, 11 May 1991)
- Lowest home attendance: 15,870 (v Stoke City, 26 September 1990)
- Average home league attendance: 22,565

For the 1990–91 West Ham United F.C. season in English football, West Ham United finished 2nd in the league.

== Season summary ==
Billy Bonds in his first full season as manager guided West Ham back to the top flight of The Football League as the team finished second in the Second Division, one point behind Oldham Athletic, who pipped them to the title on the last day of the season. Oldham were the season's top scorers in the division with 83 goals.

West Ham finished the season with the meanest defence, conceding 34 goals. The second meanest defence belonged to 7th place Middlesbrough, containing Colin Cooper and Tony Mowbray, which conceded 47 goals. West Ham's two games against Middlesbrough ended in 0–0 draws.

West Ham also enjoyed their best FA Cup run since the triumph of 1980, reaching the semi-finals where they were beaten 4–0 by Nottingham Forest, denying them a Wembley final with local rivals Tottenham Hotspur who went on to win the trophy.

Trevor Morley was West Ham's leading scorer for 1990–91, with 12 goals in the league and 17 in all competitions, while Frank McAvennie showed full fitness after a long term injury by scoring 10 goals in the league (11 in all competitions) to finish the campaign as the club's second top scorer.

== Results ==
West Ham United's score comes first

=== Football League Second Division ===
Date	Opponent	Venue	Result	Attendance	Scorers
25 August 1990	Middlesbrough	A	0–0	20,680	
29 August 1990	Portsmouth	H	1–1	20,835	McAvennie
1 September 1990	Watford	H	1–0	19,872	Dicks (pen)
8 September 1990	Leicester City	A	2–1	14,605	James (o.g.), Morley
15 September 1990	Wolverhampton Wanderers	H	1–1	23,241	Martin
19 September 1990	Ipswich Town	H	3–1	18,764	Bishop, Quinn, Morley
22 September 1990	Newcastle United	A	1–1	25,462	Morley
29 September 1990	Sheffield Wednesday	A	1–1	28,786	Dicks
3 October 1990	Oxford United	H	2–0	18,125	Foster, Morley
6 October 1990	Hull City	H	7–1	19,472	Quinn (2), Potts, Dicks (2; 1 pen), Parris, Morley
13 October 1990	Bristol City	A	1–1	16,838	McAvennie
20 October 1990	Swindon Town	A	1–0	13,658	McAvennie
24 October 1990	Blackburn Rovers	H	1–0	20,003	Bishop
27 October 1990	Charlton Athletic	H	2–1	24,019	Allen (2)
3 November 1990	Notts County	A	1–0	10,871	Morley
10 November 1990	Millwall	A	1–1	20,591	McAvennie
17 November 1990	Brighton & Hove Albion	H	2–1	24,019	Slater, Foster
24 November 1990	Plymouth Argyle	A	1–0	11,490	McAvennie
1 December 1990	West Bromwich Albion	H	3–1	24,753	Parris, Morley, McAvennie
8 December 1990	Portsmouth	A	1–0	12,045	Morley
15 December 1990	Middlesbrough	H	0–0	23,705	
22 December 1990	Barnsley	A	0–1	10,348	
26 December 1990	Oldham Athletic	H	2–0	24,950	Morley, Slater
28 December 1990	Port Vale	H	0–0	23,603	
1 January 1991	Bristol Rovers	A	1–0	7,932	Quinn
12 January 1991	Watford	A	1–0	17,172	Morley
19 January 1991	Leicester City	H	1–0	21,652	Parris
2 February 1991	Wolverhampton Wanderers	A	1–2	19,454	McAvennie
24 February 1991	Millwall	H	3–1	20,503	McAvennie (2), Morley
2 March 1991	West Bromwich Albion	A	0–0	16,089	
5 March 1991	Plymouth Argyle	H	2–2	18,933	Marker (o.g.), Breacker
13 March 1991	Oxford United	A	1–2	8,225	Quinn
16 March 1991	Sheffield Wednesday	H	1–3	26,182	Quinn
20 March 1991	Bristol City	H	1–0	22,951	Gale
23 March 1991	Hull City	A	0–0	9,558	
29 March 1991	Oldham Athletic	A	1–1	16,932	Bishop (p)
1 April 1991	Barnsley	H	3–2	24,607	McAvennie, Dowie, Foster
6 April 1991	Port Vale	A	1–0	9,658	Bishop
10 April 1991	Brighton & Hove Albion	A	0–1	11,904	
17 April 1991	Ipswich Town	A	1–0	20,290	Morley
20 April 1991	Swindon Town	H	2–0	25,944	Parris, Dowie
24 April 1991	Newcastle United	H	1–1	24,195	Dowie
27 April 1991	Blackburn Rovers	A	1–3	10,808	Dowie
4 May 1991	Charlton Athletic	A	1–1	16,137	Allen
8 May 1991	Bristol Rovers	H	1–0	23,054	Slater
11 May 1991	Notts County	H	1–2	26,551	Parris

=== FA Cup ===
Round	Date	Opponent	Venue	Result	Attendance	Goalscorers
R3	5 January 1991	Aldershot	A	0–0	22,929	
R3R	16 January 1991	Aldershot	H	6–1	21,484	Morley (2), Slater, Parris, Bishop, Quinn
R4	26 January 1991	Luton Town	A	1–1	12,087	Parris 43'
R4R	30 January 1991	Luton Town	H	5–0	25,659	Parris 45', Bishop 53', McAvennie 54', Morley (2) 68', 83'
R5	15 February 1991	Crewe Alexandra	H	1–0	25,298	Quinn
R6	11 March 1991	Everton	H	2–1	28,161	Foster 33', Slater 60'
SF	14 April 1991	Nottingham Forest	N	0–4	40,041	

=== League Cup ===
Round	Date	Opponent	Venue	Result	Attendance	Goalscorers
R2 1st leg	26 September 1990	Stoke City	H	3–0	15,870	Dicks (pen), Keen, Quinn
R2 2nd leg	10 October 1990	Stoke City	A	2–1 (won 5–1 on agg)	8,411	Allen (2)
R3	31 October 1990	Oxford United	A	1–2	7,528	Morley

== Squad ==
Number		Player	Position	Lge Apps	Lge Gls	FAC Apps	FAC Gls	LC Apps	LC Gls	Date Signed	Previous club
West Ham United 1990–91 First XI
1	(Czechoslovakia)	Ludek Miklosko (Hammer of the Year)	GK	46		7		3		February 1990	Banik Ostrava
2	(England)	Steve Potts	RB	36(1)	1	7		2		May 1984	Academy
3	(England)	George Parris	LM	37(7)	5	7	3	2 (1)		1985	Academy
4	(England)	Tony Gale	CB	23(1)	1	7		0 (1)		August 1983	Fulham
5	(England)	Colin Foster	CB	36	3	3	1	3		1989	Nottingham Forest
6	(Republic of Ireland)	Chris Hughton	LB	32		7				1990	Tottenham
7	(England)	Ian Bishop (Captain)	CM	40	4	5 (1)	2	3		December 1989	Manchester City
8	(Scotland)	Frank McAvennie	CF	24(10)	10	3 (1)	1	0 (1)		March 1989	Celtic
9	(England)	Stuart Slater	RM	37(3)	3	7	2	2		1987	Academy
10	(England)	Kevin Keen	CM	36(4)		6 (1)		3	1	1986	Academy
11	(England)	Trevor Morley	CF	38	12	6	4	3	1	December 1989	Manchester City
Important Players
10	(England)	Martin Allen	M	28(12)	3	2		3	2	August 1989	Queens Park Rangers
8	(Northern Ireland)	Jimmy Quinn	CF	16(10)	6	3 (2)	2	3	1	December 1989	Bradford City
2	(England)	Tim Breacker	RB	23(1)	1	6				October 1990	Luton Town
5	(England)	Alvin Martin	CB	20	1			3		July 1976	Academy
3	(England)	Julian Dicks	LB	13	4			2	1	March 1988	Birmingham City
9	(Northern Ireland)	Iain Dowie	CF	12	4					March 1991	Luton Town
Other Players
5	(Scotland)	Ray Stewart	RB	5		0 (1)				September 1979	Dundee United
9	(England)	Matthew Rush	W	2 (3)				1		1990	Academy
9	(England)	Franz Carr	F	1 (2)						March 1991	Nottingham Forest
9	(England)	Simon Livett	M	1		0 (1)				1990	Academy
14	(England)	Leroy Rosenior	CF	0 (2)						March 1988	Fulham
12	(England)	Simon Clarke	F	0 (1)						1990	Academy
5	(England)	Stewart Robson	M	0 (1)		1				January 1987	Arsenal
