= Frank McAvennie =

Scottish footballer

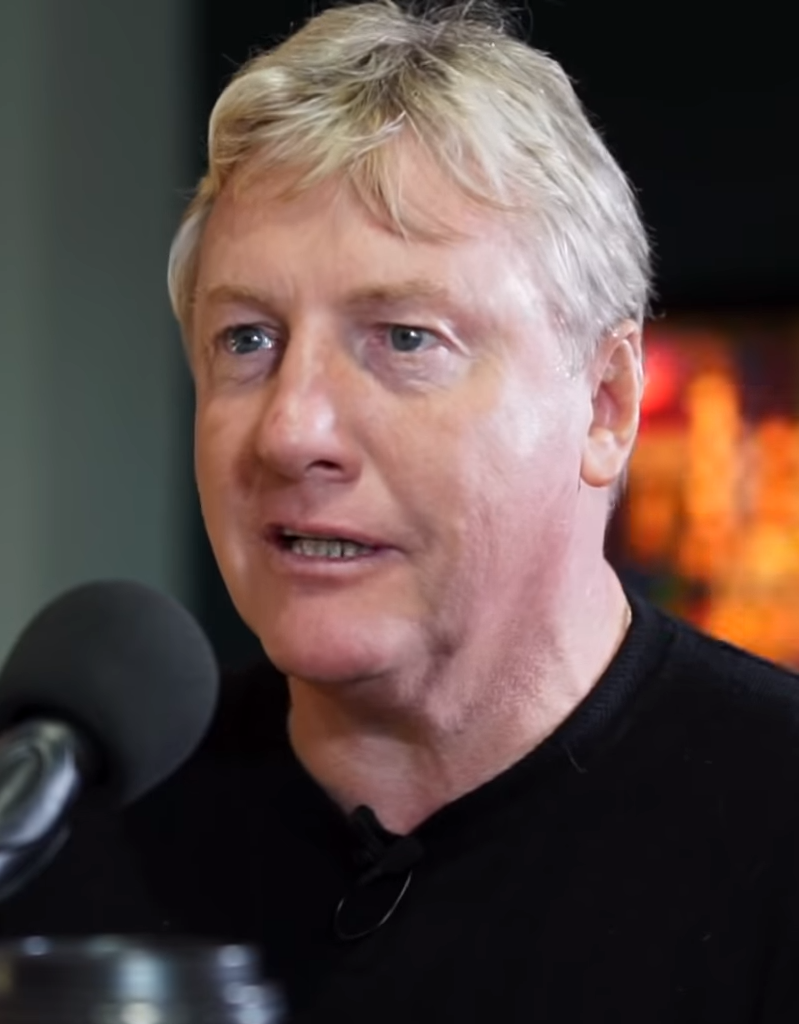
- McAvennie in 2018

Personal information
- Full name: Francis McAvennie
- Date of birth: 22 November 1959 (age 66)
- Place of birth: Glasgow, Scotland
- Height: 5 ft 9 in (1.75 m)
- Position: Striker

Youth career
- 1979–1980: Johnstone Burgh

Senior career*
Years	Team	Apps	(Gls)
1980–1985	St Mirren	135	(48)
1985–1987	West Ham United	85	(33)
1987–1989	Celtic	55	(27)
1989–1992	West Ham United	68	(16)
1992	Aston Villa	3	(0)
1992	Cliftonville	0	(0)
1992	South China	0	(0)
1992–1994	Celtic	30	(10)
1994	→ Swindon Town (loan)	7	(0)
1994	Falkirk	3	(2)
1994–1995	St Mirren	7	(0)
Total		393+	(136+)

International career
1982–1987	Scotland U21	4	(1)
1985–1988	Scotland	5	(1)
1987	Scotland B	1	(0)
- * Club domestic league appearances and goals

Francis McAvennie (born 22 November 1959) is a Scottish former professional footballer who played as a striker. He spent two spells playing for each of St Mirren, West Ham United and Celtic. With Celtic, he won the Scottish Premier Division in 1987–88 and the Scottish Cup in 1988. He was capped five times at senior level for Scotland during the 1980s, scoring one goal.

== Early life ==
Born in Glasgow, McAvennie grew up in Milton and attended St. Augustine's School there.

== Club career ==
=== Early career ===
McAvennie started his playing career in Scottish Junior League football. In 1979 during an amateur game with a local side, the 200 Club, in Kirkintilloch, McAvennie, playing well, came to the attention of local scouts. He was recommended to local junior side Johnstone Burgh signing for them for a £500 fee. He completed a trial for Partick Thistle playing in a single game where he was sent on as a substitute only to be substituted off in the same game and be told by manager Bertie Auld that he would never make a career in the game of football. Before turning professional, he had joined the Territorial Army and later had trials with the British Army but was not accepted for a role with them due to his inability to hit the target during shooting practices. He also had a spell working as a road sweeper. He did not move into professional football until he joined St Mirren in 1980, at the age of 20. His league debut came in the 1981–82 season in a 4–3 defeat of Airdrieonians. Playing as a midfielder, McAvennie scored two goals. In 1982, he was named Scottish PFA Young Player of the Year. He made 135 league appearances for them over the next five years, scoring 48 goals.

=== West Ham United ===
His strong form in Scotland attracted attention from English clubs and McAvennie had talks with Luton Town and their manager, David Pleat, in the summer of 1985. With talks progressing well McAvennie decided not to sign for Luton due to the attitude of their chairman, David Evans. With St Mirren then agreeing a fee with West Ham United, McAvennie met with their manager John Lyall and his staff at Toddington services on the M1 motorway, and he signed for them in June 1985 for £340,000. He made his West Ham debut on 17 August 1985, the opening game of the season, in a 1–0 away defeat to Birmingham City with his first two goals coming in his second game, a 3–1 home defeat of Queens Park Rangers. Originally signed as an attacking midfielder, he was played as an out-and-out striker after an injury to Paul Goddard in the opening game of the season. He went on to keep Goddard out of the team and spark his transfer from the club the following season. He formed a formidable partnership with young English striker Tony Cottee with McAvennie scoring 26 league goals and Cottee 20. One additional goal in both the League Cup and the FA Cup saw his tally rise to 28 goals in 51 appearances in all competitions. In his first season, he helped West Ham to their highest ever final position in English football when they came third, just four points behind champions Liverpool. His 26 goals in the league was only bettered by Gary Lineker, who found the net 30 times for second-placed Everton.

At this time McAvennie's success on the pitch came to the attention of TV producers. He appeared on the BBC's Wogan show, hosted by Terry Wogan, an event which McAvennie claims changed his life and introduced him to a celebrity lifestyle. He is quoted as saying "Then I signed for West Ham and money and girls were thrown at me and, hey, who was I to say no? Then I went on Wogan and it really took off. I was never under any illusions why it was happening. It wisnae because of my looks, it was because I was a footballer."

West Ham were denied UEFA Cup action for the following season due to the ban on English clubs in European competitions, which had started a year earlier due to the Heysel disaster. The following season was less successful as they finished 15th as McAvennie scored just seven league goals from 36 games and eleven from 47 games in all competitions. He began the 1987–88 season still at West Ham.

=== Celtic ===
McAvennie played eight games for the Hammers at the start of 1987–88, failing to score, before he moved to Celtic for a then club record fee of £750,000 on 2 October 1987. Graeme Souness had approached him to join rivals Rangers at the 1986 FIFA World Cup which would have made him the first high-profile Catholic player to play for the Protestant club, but he refused, being a supporter of Celtic. He made his debut for Celtic the following day in a 1–1 draw at home against Hibernian.

McAvennie made a slow start at Celtic and his progress was not helped when he got involved in an on-field fracas with Chris Woods, Terry Butcher and Graham Roberts in an Old Firm game in November 1987. McAvennie and Woods were sent off in the initial incident, whilst Butcher was sent off later in the game. All four were later reported to the Procurator Fiscal and appeared in court on disorder charges relating to their conduct in that game. McAvennie was found not guilty, Roberts not proven, whilst Butcher and Woods were both convicted of Breach of the Peace.

McAvennie eventually found his form at Parkhead, and his 15 goals in 1987–88 helped Celtic to a Scottish Premier Division and Scottish Cup double. That season (the club's centenary season), he was part of a formidable front trio with Andy Walker and Joe Miller. One of the high-points during the season for McAvennie were his two goals in Celtic's 2–0 win over Rangers in January 1988. The cup final in May was particularly memorable for McAvennie as he scored two late goals to beat Dundee United 2–1, the winning goal coming in the final minute.

The following season, 1988–89, was not a happy one for Celtic and the team finished in third place in the league behind winners Rangers and second-placed Aberdeen. McAvennie was one of Celtic's few form players that season and he had scored 11 goals by Christmas 1988, but a broken arm sustained in the New Year game at Ibrox against Rangers curtailed his goalscoring. McAvennie also wished to return to London to enable him to spend more time with then girlfriend, glamour model Jenny Blyth. After a public row with manager Billy McNeill over being dropped for a league match at Tynecastle in March 1989 against Hearts, Celtic relented to McAvennie's repeated requests for a transfer and sold him back to West Ham.

=== Back to West Ham ===
McAvennie returned to West Ham United in March 1989 in a £1.25 million deal, making him their record signing. His weekly wages were £2,200, his highest ever weekly wage as a footballer. According to Celtic manager Billy McNeill's autobiography, McAvennie wanted to return to London and his model girlfriend Jenny Blyth. McAvennie claims in his autobiography that Celtic were refusing to pay him a signing-on fee. Just before his return to Boleyn Ground, Celtic had accepted an offer from title chasing Arsenal, whose manager George Graham was looking for a proven goalscorer to partner Alan Smith. McAvennie turned down the chance to join Arsenal and accepted John Lyall's offer shortly afterwards. While Arsenal won the First Division, West Ham were relegated to the Second Division and McAvennie failed to score a single goal in the remaining nine games of the season. He has since admitted that his decision to join West Ham and not Arsenal was based on his love of the club and not on the likelihood of footballing success.

His second spell in London was not as successful as his previous one. Now playing in the Second Division, things got worse for both McAvennie and West Ham when the striker suffered a broken leg on the opening game of the season on 19 August 1989, following a challenge by Stoke City's Chris Kamara, which put him out until March 1990. He made his return on 31 March 1990 against Port Vale. By this time West Ham were 10th in the league and ultimately finished in seventh place missing out on the playoffs. This unsettling period at Upton Park also saw manager Lou Macari resign and being succeeded by Billy Bonds.

In the aftermath of his injury, it was alleged in the tabloid press that McAvennie had threatened legal action against Kamara. This did not materialise and McAvennie has stated he had no intention of litigation. Kamara's view was that his challenge was innocuous and perfectly good and that McAvennie has created "many lies and false recollections" concerning the tackle. McAvennie recalls in his autobiography, Scoring, An Expert's Guide, that Kamara had "come straight through him, crumpling him to the ground" and had then stood over him saying "Get up you Scottish bastard, this is a man's game". The tackle resulted in a broken leg, shattered ankle and torn ligaments for McAvennie who had two plates and a bolt inserted in his ankle and another plate in his leg. Incensed by the tackle some supporters of West Ham sent death threats to Kamara. Out injured, on pain-killers and with spare-time on his hands McAvennie visited London's nightclubs to take his mind off his injuries and the boredom of not playing football. At these venues he was introduced to cocaine to which he became addicted.

McAvennie was fully fit for the 1990–91 season. His first goal in his second spell for West Ham and his first since April 1987 game on 29 August 1990 in a 1–1 home game against Portsmouth; the second game of the season. West Ham won promotion from the Second Division and reached the 1990–91 FA Cup semi-finals. He played 34 league games and scored 10 goals, now partnering Trevor Morley up front (his previous West Ham strike partner Tony Cottee had departed to Everton in August 1988).

The 1991–92 season was a disappointing one for both West Ham and McAvennie. He scored only three league goals in the first half of the season with West Ham never out of the bottom three after Christmas. He also faced competition for a regular place from new signing Mike Small. On 2 May 1992, he signed off in style at West Ham, scoring a hat-trick in his final match against Nottingham Forest having come on as a substitute for Mitchell Thomas. West Ham had already been relegated in 22nd and bottom place. His tally in a frustrating season for both the player and the club was just six goals from 20 league games.

=== Aston Villa ===
McAvennie then accepted an offer from Ron Atkinson to sign for Aston Villa on a free transfer, but played just three games in the new Premier League, as the partnership of Dalian Atkinson and early season signing Dean Saunders saw Villa emerge as title challengers. Villa finally finished runners-up to Manchester United. McAvennie did not score for Villa. He left in January 1993 to rejoin Celtic, who were now lagging behind a dominant Rangers side on their way to a fifth successive league title.

=== Cliftonville and South China ===
McAvennie played one game for Irish League club Cliftonville in 1992, scoring in a Gold Cup semi-final. McAvennie was then offered a contract with Hong Kong side South China. Despite being well received by the local fans and management, he found the standard of football to be unchallenging. He played only one senior game for South China, then he returned to the United Kingdom.

=== Back to Celtic ===
On hearing of his exit from Hong Kong, John Lambie agreed terms with McAvennie to sign for Partick Thistle. Although a press conference to announce the signing was arranged at Firhill Stadium, Celtic manager, Liam Brady, hearing he was available, persuaded him to sign for his former club which he did in January 1993. He scored nine goals in 19 league games that season, though Celtic could only manage a third-place finish as Rangers secured their fifth successive title.

In 1993–94, McAvennie managed just 11 league appearances, scoring once, as he lost his place in the team following Liam Brady's departure and the appointment of Lou Macari as manager. In February 1994, Macari loaned McAvennie to English Premier League strugglers Swindon Town, and he made just seven league appearances and failed to score as the Robins were relegated in bottom place at the end the 1993–94 season in which they managed only five wins and conceded 100 goals. A highlight of his spell at the County Ground came on 19 March 1994 when he helped the Robins hold league leaders (and eventual double winners) Manchester United to a 2–2 draw.

=== Falkirk and St Mirren ===
McAvennie left Celtic for a second time and signed for Falkirk, newly promoted to the Scottish Premier Division for 1994–95, and scoring twice in three games before dropping down a division and returning to St Mirren on a free transfer on 14 October 1994. He played seven games for St Mirren that season, failing to score, before retiring as a player at the age of 35. In a professional career which had stretched for 15 years, he managed a total of 136 goals in the English and Scottish leagues, combined with many more in the cups and also in Europe for Celtic.

== International career ==
McAvennie was called into the Scotland national team in 1985 for the World Cup qualifying play-off with Australia at Hampden Park on 20 November. Following a 58th-minute goal by Davie Cooper, McAvennie scored in the 60th minute on his international debut. The game finished 2–0 to Scotland. In the return leg in Melbourne on 4 December 1985, which was McAvennie's second international appearance, the game finished 0-0, resulting in Scotland qualifying for the 1986 FIFA World Cup.

He was selected for the 1986 World Cup by interim national coach Alex Ferguson. He made two appearances in the World Cup in Mexico, both as a substitute and both defeats, to Denmark and to West Germany. He won five caps for Scotland, the last against Saudi Arabia in February 1988 in a 2–2 draw in Riyadh.

== Lifestyle ==
During his playing career, McAvennie reputedly enjoyed a playboy lifestyle involving drink, drugs and womanising. His lifestyle was the inspiration for a parody character played by Jonathan Watson in the Scottish comedy TV programme Only an Excuse?

In 2000, having been cleared in court of an incident involving the supply of controlled drugs, McAvennie found himself in severe financial difficulties and resorted to selling his medals to Celtic-supporting businessman Willie Haughey for a small sum; these were later returned to him in 2017.

On 12 January 2009, McAvennie received a four-month suspended sentence for affray following an incident in July 2008 in which he head-butted a man in Douglas on the Isle of Man after being provoked by a man later convicted of fraud.

== Career statistics ==
=== International ===
Scotland
Year	Apps	Goals
1985	2	1
1986	2	0
1988	1	0
Total	5	1

#	Date	Venue	Opponent	Score	Result	Competition	Ref
1	20 November 1985	Hampden Park, Glasgow, Scotland	Australia	2–0	2–0 Win	1986 World Cup qualifying play-off	

== Honours ==
=== Player ===
St Mirren

- Renfrewshire Cup: 1984–85

Celtic

- Scottish Premier Division: 1987–88
- Scottish Cup: 1987–88

West Ham United

- Football League Second Division runner-up: 1990–91

Individual

- PFA Scotland Young Player of the Year: 1981–82
- Hammer of the Year: 1985–86 (2nd)
