= Trevor Morley =

English footballer (born 1961)

Personal information
- Full name: Trevor William Morley
- Date of birth: 20 March 1961 (age 65)
- Place of birth: Nottingham, England
- Height: 5 ft 11 in (1.80 m)
- Position: Striker

Senior career*
Years	Team	Apps	(Gls)
1982–1985	Nuneaton Borough		
1985–1988	Northampton Town	107	(39)
1988–1989	Manchester City	72	(18)
1989–1995	West Ham United	178	(57)
1992	→ Brann (loan)	8	(4)
1993	→ Brann (loan)	6	(1)
1995	→ Brann (loan)	7	(4)
1995–1998	Reading	76	(31)
1998	Sogndal	5	(0)
Total		459	(154)

International career
1984–1985	England C	6	(0)

Managerial career
- SK Bergen Sparta
- * Club domestic league appearances and goals

Trevor William Morley (born 20 March 1961) is an English footballer manager, former professional player and pundit.

As a player, he was a striker who notably played top flight football for Manchester City and West Ham United. He also played in the Football League for Northampton Town and Reading, as well as for Norwegian clubs Brann and Sogndal. He had initially began his career with non-league side Nuneaton Borough.

He now resides in Norway and works as a pundit for TV 2. He also had a spell as manager of Norwegian fifth-tier side SK Bergen Sparta.

== Playing career ==
=== Non-league ===
Morley is the son of a former Nottingham Forest player and was rejected as a teenager by Derby County. Forced to move into non-league football with Corby Town and Nuneaton Borough with whom he won the Southern League title in 1982.

=== Northampton Town ===
In the summer of 1985 Morley moved to Northampton Town for £20,000 making his debut of Burnley on 17 August 1985. His move to Northampton arose after manager Graham Carr moved from Nuneaton to Northampton, and took Morley and Eddie McGoldrick with him. Morley captained Northampton, as they won the 1986–87 Fourth Division championship by a nine-point margin.

=== Manchester City ===
After scoring 39 league goals in 139 appearances for Northampton, Morley was signed by manager Mel Machin for Manchester City in January 1988 as part of an exchange deal that saw Tony Adcock move to the County Ground. The deal valued Morley at £235,000. He made his debut for City 23 January 1988 in a 2–0 home defeat by Aston Villa. He scored 18 league goals for Manchester City, including the equaliser at Bradford City on the last day of the 1988–89 season that meant Manchester City won promotion, a point ahead of Crystal Palace. On 23 September 1989, he put City 2–0 ahead in the famous 5–1 derby win over Manchester United in the First Division. When manager Machin was sacked by Manchester City chairman Peter Swales, his replacement Howard Kendall saw no place in his side for Morley.

=== West Ham United ===
Signed by manager Lou Macari at the end of 1989, Morley joined West Ham United from City in a deal that saw Ian Bishop also move to Upton Park, and Mark Ward travel in the other direction. Morley was valued at £450,000. Morley made his debut, along with Bishop, against Leicester City on 30 December 1989. His first goal came on 20 January 1990 in a 2–1 away win at Hull City. Morley was West Ham's top scorer, with 17 goals from 48 appearances for the 1990–91 season as they were promoted to the First Division having finished as runners-up to Oldham Athletic in the Second Division. The following season Morley scored only five goals from 32 appearances. Morley was stabbed by his wife in March 1991, missing eight league games from March until 10 April 1991. Manager Billy Bonds, in a difficult season, often used Mike Small and Clive Allen as the main strikers as West Ham finished bottom of the First Division. In the 1992–93 season with West Ham now back in the second tier of English football, Morley flourished. He was again top scorer with 22 goals from 49 appearances with West Ham again gaining promotion, this time to the Premier League as runners-up to Newcastle United. This season saw Morley's only sending-off as a West Ham player. In the Anglo-Italian Cup in a home game to Reggiana having received some rough treatment by Gianluca Francesconi, Morley struck out at the player and was sent off. His suspension only applied to games in the Anglo-Italian Cup. With West Ham now back in the top tier of English football Morley scored his first Premier League goal on 18 August 1993 in a 2–0 away win at Blackburn Rovers, a game which saw the debuts of Lee Chapman and David Burrows and Mike Marsh who had joined following the departure of Julian Dicks to Liverpool. In their first Premier League season West Ham finished 13th with Morley again the top scorer, this time with 16 goals from 49 games. Other notable goals by Morley this season came in a 1–0 home defeat of Chelsea, a 2–2 home draw with Manchester United, a 4–1 away win at Tottenham Hotspur and a 2–0 away win at Arsenal. In season 1994–95 Morley failed to score at all in 16 appearances. With goals now coming from Tony Cottee and midfielder Don Hutchison, Morley was allowed to leave, his last game coming on 14 May 1995, the last game of the season, in a 1–1 home draw with Manchester United. Needing a win to clinch the 1994–95 Premier League title, Manchester United could only draw, handing the title to Blackburn Rovers. Morley scored 70 goals in 215 league and cup appearances for the Upton Park club. He was voted Hammer of the Year in 1994.

=== Reading ===
Prior to joining Reading in the summer of 1995, Morley played on loan at SK Brann for his third summer stint. In 1996 Morley suffered a severe head injury playing against Portsmouth. Elbowed by Jon Gittens Morley's forehead was crumpled, a sliver of shattered bone entering his eye. He suffered a depressed fracture above his right eyebrow. The injury required forty staples, extensive surgery including facial reconstruction, four days in hospital and the insertion of six metal plates in his skull which will remain for the rest of his life. He was Reading's player of the season for season 1996–97. In November 1997 he memorably scored a late winner at Elland Road to knock Premier League side Leeds United out of the League Cup and put Reading in the quarter-finals. He also played for Sogndal in 1998.

== Personal life ==
Morley was stabbed by his wife in 1991, he later speculated that she was behind false accusations of him being in a homosexual relationship with friend and teammate Ian Bishop. Morley stated "The rumours about me being gay killed me for a while. I've got nothing against gays – I now have friends who are gay – but it's not nice to be called a homosexual when you aren't one. How many times does Robbie Williams have to come out and tell the world he isn't gay? The more you say it, the more people start to believe it's true... It ruined my football for a while. I'd go out onto the field and hide. I didn't want to be there... Hearing gay comments from some West Ham fans was hard to take."

He later had a spell scouting for Arsenal in Norway and, in 2000, took on the manager's role at SK Bergen Sparta of the Norwegian Fifth Division.

He currently lives in Norway, where he runs a not for-profit shelter for addicts and works as a football pundit for TV 2.

== Honours ==
Northampton Town

- Football League Fourth Division: 1986–87

Individual

- PFA Team of the Year: 1986–87 Fourth Division, 1990–91 Second Division
