= Simon Clarke (footballer) =

English footballer (born 1971)

Personal information
- Full name: Simon Nathan Clarke
- Date of birth: 23 September 1971 (age 55)
- Place of birth: Chelmsford, England
- Position: Left midfielder

Senior career*
Years	Team	Apps	(Gls)
1991–1993	West Ham United	3	(0)
1992	→ Kettering Town (loan)		
1993–1995	Kettering Town		
1995–2002	Hendon	251	(13)
2002–2005	Chelmsford City		
- * Club domestic league appearances and goals

Simon Nathan Clarke (born 23 September 1971) is an English former footballer who played, as a left midfielder.

== Career ==
Clarke was a product of West Ham United's youth system. He played for Chelmsford Schools before signing for West Ham, playing for their youth and reserve teams. He was limited to three substitute appearances for West Ham, his debut coming in the last minute of an away win against Watford in January 1991. He was to make only two further appearances for The Hammers before joining Kettering Town on loan in December 1992. He was released by West Ham in May 1993.

Following his release by West Ham, Clarke dropped into Non-League football, re-signing for former club Kettering in the summer of 1993, becoming a "regular goalscorer" during his second spell at the club. In 1995, after two years at Kettering, Clarke joined Hendon, making his debut in a 2–0 loss against rivals Enfield in the Isthmian League. In the 1996–97 season, Clarke won Hendon's supporters' player of the year award, after making 44 appearances in all competitions, scoring three times. Clarke once again won the award in the 2001–02 season, his final campaign at the club. In total, Clarke made 351 appearances for Hendon in all competitions, scoring 16 times. In 2002, Clarke signed for hometown club Chelmsford City, however missed the start of the 2002–03 season due to a broken leg. On 24 March 2003, Clarke started at Roots Hall as Chelmsford beat Aveley 5–0 in the Essex Senior Cup final. In 2005, Clarke departed the club.
