= Matthew Rush (footballer) =

Footballer (born 1971)

Personal information
- Full name: Matthew James Rush
- Date of birth: 6 August 1971 (age 55)
- Place of birth: Hackney, London, England
- Position: Winger

Youth career
- West Ham United

Senior career*
| Years | Team | Apps | (Gls) |
| 1990–1995 | West Ham United | 48 | (10) |
| 1993 | → Cambridge United (loan) | 10 | (0) |
| 1994 | → Swansea City (loan) | 13 | (7) |
| 1995–1997 | Norwich City | 3 | (0) |
| 1996–1997 | → Northampton Town (loan) | 14 | (7) |
| 1997–1998 | Oldham Athletic | 25 | (14) |
| 1999 | Dulwich Hamlet | | |
- Dagenham & Redbridge
| 2002 | Droylsden | | |
- Ashton United

International career
| 1991–1992 | Republic of Ireland U21 | 4 | (0) |
- * Club domestic league appearances and goals

Matthew James Rush (born 6 August 1971) is a former professional footballer who played as a winger.

He notably played in the Premier League for West Ham United, and in the Football League for Cambridge United, Swansea City, Norwich City, Northampton Town and Oldham Athletic. He also played non-league football for Dulwich Hamlet, Dagenham & Redbridge, Droylsden and Ashton United. Born in England, he was capped four times by the Republic of Ireland U21.

== Club career ==
=== West Ham United ===
Rush signed apprentice forms with West Ham United in 1988 and professional forms in March 1990. He made his debut for the first-team as a substitute in a 7–1 win over Hull City in a Second Division match in October 1990. He made five league appearances and one in the League Cup in the 1990–91 season, and also gained caps for the Republic of Ireland under-21 team, for whom he qualified through his Irish mother. West Ham were promoted to the First Division in 1991–92 and Rush made ten appearances, scoring two goals, both against Norwich City in April 1992, as West Ham battled against relegation and ultimately went down into the First Division again. His only appearances in the 1992–93 season came against Cosenza and Pisa in the Anglo-Italian Cup in December 1992 as manager Billy Bonds preferred experience to youth in a successful bid to get West Ham promoted again. Unable to break into the first-team, Rush joined Cambridge United on loan in March 1993 until the end of the season, where he made ten appearances.

West Ham were promoted to the Premiership at the end of the 1992–93 season but injuries and competition for places meant that Rush made only one appearance as substitute in the first half of the 1993–94 season. Billy Bonds sent him out on loan to Swansea City in January 1994, where he helped Swansea to progress to the semi-finals of the Autoglass Trophy. He was recalled to West Ham in March and started the final nine games of the season, scoring in the first against Ipswich Town with a strike from 25 yards. He signed a three-year contract in the summer of 1994, turning down interest from Kevin Keegan and Newcastle United. He made 26 league and cup appearances in the 1994–95 season, scoring twice. At the end of the season, manager Harry Redknapp was willing to release Rush and he joined Norwich City in August 1995.

=== Norwich City ===
Rush joined Norwich City in August 1995 for a fee of £350,000. Three days later, he badly ruptured his knee on his debut against Sunderland. He was loaned out to Northampton Town for five months in October 1996, where he made 13 appearances, scoring three goals. His first-team opportunities at Norwich were limited by his injury and a change of managers and he made just three appearances for Norwich before he was released in March 1997.

=== Oldham Athletic ===
Rush joined Oldham Athletic in March 1997 for a fee of £165,000. He made 30 league and cup appearances for Oldham until he sustained cruciate ligament injuries in a match against Carlisle United in April 1998 and he was forced to retire from professional football at the age of 27.

== International career ==
Born in London, England. Rush represented the Republic of Ireland at the under-21 level and was capped four times.

== Post-playing career ==
Rush enrolled on a sports science course at the University of East London, graduated with a degree in Sports Development and took up a post at a sports college in Manchester in 2001. While studying, he played football for non-league teams Dulwich Hamlet and Dagenham & Redbridge, and joined Droylsden in May 2002 as he wished to carry on playing on a part-time basis while working.

== Personal life ==
Rush lives in London. His daughter Lana (born 1997) competed in junior Wimbledon 2012 & 2013. Rush works as a PE Teacher in Isleworth and Syon school for boys.
