= Mitchell Thomas =

English footballer

Personal information
- Full name: Mitchell Antony Thomas
- Date of birth: 2 October 1964 (age 62)
- Place of birth: Luton, England
- Height: 6 ft 0 in (1.83 m)
- Position: Defender

Senior career*
Years	Team	Apps	(Gls)
1982–1986	Luton Town	107	(1)
1986–1991	Tottenham Hotspur	157	(6)
1991–1994	West Ham United	38	(3)
1994–1999	Luton Town	186	(5)
1999–2002	Burnley	99	(0)
Total		587	(15)

International career
1982	England Youth	3	(0)
1985–1986	England U21	3	(0)
- * Club domestic league appearances and goals

Mitchell Thomas (born 2 October 1964) is an English former footballer who played as a defender. While at Tottenham Hotspur he started in the 1987 FA Cup Final.

== Playing career ==
David Pleat brought Thomas into the Luton Town side from Limbury boys club in 1982. In 1985/86 Thomas played three games for England U21s in the European U21 championships. He played in a qualifier and one leg each of the quarter and semi finals, with two of his Luton Town colleagues Tim Breacker and Mike Newell. He was sold to Tottenham in July 1986 for a fee of £275,000, following the same movement of manager David Pleat. After his spell at Tottenham during which he played in the 1987 FA Cup Final, Thomas moved to West Ham Utd in August 1991 for £500,000 joining former Luton teammate Tim Breacker.

On transfer deadline day in March 1994, he returned to Luton Town on a free transfer, and he stayed there until the club went into receivership over the summer of 1999 and were forced to sell many players. Stan Ternent signed Thomas, for Burnley, for the start of the 1999-2000 season, which they ended by winning promotion. He remained at Turf Moor until retiring as a player in 2002.

== Since Retirement ==
Since retirement from playing, Thomas has played a part in the transfer of several players. His role was controversial resulting in investigations into the transfers of Jermain Defoe to Tottenham Hotspur and Shaun Wright-Phillips to Chelsea. Thomas was also embroiled in a controversy of this type when he was transferred to Tottenham.

== Honours ==
Tottenham Hotspur

- FA Cup runner-up: 1986–87

== External sources ==
- Mitchell Thomas at Soccerbase
- Luton sell Mitchell.
- "Goodbye to Mitchell" from Clarets-Mad.
- Mitchell Thomas at Clarets-Mad.
