= Mike Small (footballer) =

English footballer

Personal information
- Full name: Michael Anthony Small
- Date of birth: 2 March 1962 (age 64)
- Place of birth: Birmingham, England
- Position: Forward

Senior career*
Years	Team	Apps	(Gls)
- Bromsgrove Rovers
1981–1983	Luton Town	4	(0)
1982–1983	→ Peterborough United (loan)	4	(1)
1983–1985	Go Ahead Eagles	54	(19)
1985	Standard Liège	25	(2)
1986	→ NAC Breda (loan)	23	(2)
1986–1987	Go Ahead Eagles	24	(3)
1987–1988	Vitesse Arnhem	26	(12)
1988–1990	PAOK	31	(9)
1990–1991	Brighton & Hove Albion	39	(13)
1991–1993	West Ham United	49	(13)
1993–1994	→ Wolverhampton Wanderers (loan)	3	(1)
1994	→ Charlton Athletic (loan)	2	(0)
1994	BK Häcken	4	(0)
1994	Stevenage Borough		
1994–1995	Sligo Rovers	21	(9)
1997–1998	Derry City	1	(0)

International career
1981	England U20	5	(3)

Managerial career
- Haringey Borough
- Kingsbury Town
- * Club domestic league appearances and goals

Michael Anthony Small (born 2 March 1962) is an English former professional footballer who played as a forward.

== Playing career ==
Small began his professional career with Luton Town and made three substitute appearances for them in 1981–82. After a stint on loan at Peterborough United, Small played in Belgium with Standard Liège, the Netherlands with Vitesse Arnhem, NAC Breda and Go Ahead Eagles, and in Greece with PAOK. Small spent the 1990–91 season at Second Division side Brighton & Hove Albion and scored 21 goals, a total which made him the club's top scorer, helping them to reach the play-off final.

He joined West Ham United of the First Division in 1991 for a fee of £400,000. He made his debut against Luton on 17 August 1991 and scored 18 goals in his first season, but could not prevent the club being relegated, and found himself returning to the Second Division.

Small received a red card in the first game of the 1992–93 season and, with competition from Trevor Morley and recent arrival Clive Allen, rarely featured after that. He played his last game for West Ham against Notts County on 13 March 1993. Towards the end of his Hammers contract, Small spent time on loan to Wolverhampton Wanderers, where he scored against Sunderland, and also with Charlton Athletic in 1993–94.

He signed for Lawrie Sanchez at Sligo Rovers in November 1994 and scored on his League of Ireland debut at Cobh Ramblers

Small briefly returned to the league by signing for Derry City F.C. in January 1998 but only made one appearance.

== European competitions ==
Small had an eventful European career and in his first stint at Go Ahead Eagles he scored twice in the 1984 Intertoto Cup.

In the 1988–89 UEFA Cup Small played against Diego Maradona for PAOK FC

== Coaching career ==
Small went into non-league management at Haringey Borough of the Spartan South Midlands League Premier Division before going on to co-manage Kingsbury Town of the Isthmian League. He joined the management team at Waltham Forest in late 2007, only to depart at the turn of the year after a disagreement with the club's chairman.
