= 1988–89 West Ham United F.C. season =

English football team season

West Ham United
1988–89 season
- Chairman: Len Cearns
- Manager: John Lyall
- Stadium: Boleyn Ground
- First Division: 19th (relegated)
- FA Cup: Sixth round
- League Cup: Semi-finals
- Top goalscorer: League: Leroy Rosenior (7); All: Rosenior (11)
- Highest home attendance: 30,188 (v Liverpool, 29 October 1988)
- Lowest home attendance: 14,766 (v Southampton, 15 April 1989)
- Average home league attendance: 20,743
Home colours

For the 1988–89 West Ham United F.C. season in English football, West Ham United finished 19th in the league.

== Season summary ==
The 1988–89 season saw new signings Allen McKnight and David Kelly both begin their West Ham United careers, but neither supplied the club with the kind of form necessary to stay in the top flight.

On 22 March 1989, it looked as though Lyall had come up with the goods to save West Ham's top flight status when he recaptured Frank McAvennie from Glasgow Celtic for a club record fee of £1.1 million – just after the player had turned down the chance to sign for Arsenal, who went on to win the league. However, McAvennie failed to repeat the goalscoring heroics of his first spell at Upton Park as he didn't score a single goal in nine league appearances and the Hammers were relegated despite winning five of their final seven games.

The club finished in 19th place in the First Division and were relegated to the second tier of the Football League.

John Lyall was sacked as manager after 15 years on 5 June 1989, by which time he was the longest serving manager at any League club. It also ended his 34-year service with the club, which had started in 1955 when he signed for them as an apprentice player from school.

== League table ==
Pos	Team	Pld	W	D	L	GF	GA	GD	Pts	Qualification or relegation
16	Luton Town	38	10	11	17	42	52	−10	41	
17	Aston Villa	38	9	13	16	45	56	−11	40	
18	Middlesbrough (R)	38	9	12	17	44	61	−17	39	Relegation to the Second Division
19	West Ham United (R)	38	10	8	20	37	62	−25	38	Relegation to the Second Division
20	Newcastle United (R)	38	7	10	21	32	63	−31	31	Relegation to the Second Division

Source: World Football
Rules for classification: 1) Points; 2) Goal difference; 3) Goals scored
(R) Relegated

== Results ==
West Ham United's score comes first

=== Football League First Division ===
Date	Opponent	Venue	Result	Attendance	Scorers
27 August 1988	Southampton	A	0–4	18,407	
3 September 1988	Charlton Athletic	H	1–3	19,566	Keen (pen)
10 September 1988	Wimbledon	A	1–0	7,730	Ward
17 September 1988	Aston Villa	H	2–2	19,186	Mountfield (o.g.), Kelly
24 September 1988	Manchester United	A	0–2	39,941	
1 October 1988	Arsenal	H	1–4	27,658	Dickens
8 October 1988	Middlesbrough	A	0–1	19,608	
15 October 1988	Queens Park Rangers	A	1–2	14,566	Kelly
22 October 1988	Newcastle United	H	2–0	17,765	Dickens, Stewart (pen)
29 October 1988	Liverpool	H	0–2	30,188	
5 November 1988	Coventry City	A	1–1	14,651	Kelly
12 November 1988	Nottingham Forest	H	3–3	21,583	Kelly (2), Rosenior
19 November 1988	Luton Town	A	1–4	9,308	Martin
26 November 1988	Everton	H	0–1	22,176	
3 December 1988	Millwall	A	1–0	20,105	Ince
10 December 1988	Sheffield Wednesday	H	0–0	16,676	
17 December 1988	Tottenham Hotspur	H	0–2	28,365	
27 December 1988	Norwich City	A	1–2	17,491	Stewart (pen)
31 December 1988	Charlton Athletic	A	0–0	11,084	
2 January 1989	Wimbledon	H	1–2	18,346	Rosenior
14 January 1989	Derby County	A	2–1	16,796	Kelly, Brady
21 January 1989	Manchester United	H	1–3	29,822	Brady (pen)
4 February 1989	Arsenal	A	1–2	40,139	Dicks
25 February 1989	Queens Park Rangers	H	0–0	17,371	
11 March 1989	Coventry City	H	1–1	15,205	Ince
25 March 1989	Aston Villa	A	1–0	22,471	Ince
27 March 1989	Norwich City	H	0–2	27,265	
1 April 1989	Tottenham Hotspur	A	0–3	28,376	
8 April 1989	Derby County	H	1–1	16,560	Rosenior
11 April 1989	Middlesbrough	H	1–2	16,217	Keen
15 April 1989	Southampton	H	1–2	14,766	Brady (pen)
22 April 1989	Millwall	H	3–0	16,603	Dicks, Dickens, Parris
3 May 1989	Newcastle United	A	2–1	14,202	Keen, Ward
6 May 1989	Luton Town	H	1–0	18,606	Dickens
9 May 1989	Sheffield Wednesday	A	2–0	19,905	Dickens, Rosenior
13 May 1989	Everton	A	1–3	21,694	Slater
18 May 1989	Nottingham Forest	A	2–1	20,943	Rosenior (2)
23 May 1989	Liverpool	A	1–5	41,855	Rosenior

=== FA Cup ===
Round	Date	Opponent	Venue	Result	Attendance	Goalscorers
R3	8 January 1989	Arsenal	H	2–2	22,017	Dickens, Bould (o.g.)
R3R	11 January 1989	Arsenal	A	1–0	44,124	Rosenior
R4	28 January 1989	Swindon Town	A	0–0	18,627	
R4R	1 February 1989	Swindon Town	H	1–0	24,723	Rosenior
R5	18 February 1989	Charlton Athletic	A	1–0	18,785	Slater
R6	18 March 1989	Norwich City	H	0–0	29,119	
R6R	22 March 1989	Norwich City	A	1–3	25,785	Ince

=== League Cup ===
Round	Date	Opponent	Venue	Result	Attendance	Goalscorers
R2 1st leg	27 September 1988	Sunderland	A	3–0	13,691	Kelly (2), Rosenior
R2 2nd leg	12 October 1988	Sunderland	H	2–1 (won 5–1 on agg)	10,558	Kelly, Dickens
R3	1 November 1988	Derby County	H	5–0	14,226	Martin (2), Stewart (pen), Rosenior, Keen
R4	30 November 1988	Liverpool	H	4–1	26,971	Ince (2), Staunton (o.g.), Gale
QF	18 January 1989	Aston Villa	H	2–1	30,110	Ince, Kelly
SF1	12 February 1989	Luton Town	H	0–3	24,602	
SF2	1 March 1989	Luton Town	A	0–2 (lost 0–5 on agg)	12,020	

== Squad ==
Number		Player	Position	Lge Apps	Lge Gls	FAC Apps	FAC Gls	LC Apps	LC Gls	Date Signed	Previous club
West Ham United 1988–89 First XI
1	(Northern Ireland)	Allen McKnight	GK	23		4		6		1988	Celtic
2	(England)	Steve Potts	RB	23(5)		7		5 (1)		May 1984	Academy
3	(England)	Julian Dicks	LB	34	2	6		7		March 1988	Birmingham City
4	(England)	Tony Gale	CB	31		5		6	1	August 1983	Fulham
5	(England)	Alvin Martin (Captain)	CB	27	1	5		5	2	July 1976	Academy
6	(England)	Alan Dickens	CM	34(3)	5	5 (2)	1	6	1	1982	Academy
7	(England)	Mark Ward	RM	30	2	3		5 (1)		August 1985	Oldham Athletic
8	(Republic of Ireland)	David Kelly	CF	21 (4)	6	6		6 (1)	4	1988	Walsall
9	(Sierra Leone)	Leroy Rosenior	CF	26(2)	7	4	2	5	2	March 1988	Fulham
10	(Republic of Ireland)	Liam Brady	LM	21(1)	3	7		4 (1)		March 1987	Ascoli
11	(England)	Paul Ince (Hammer of the Year)	CM	32(1)	3	7	1	7	3	1986	Academy
Important Players
2	(England)	George Parris	FB	23(4)	1	1		3		1985	Academy
6	(England)	Kevin Keen	M	16(8)	3	0 (5)		1 (1)	1	1986	Academy
9	(England)	Stuart Slater	M/F	16(2)	1	3	1	1		1987	Academy
6	(England)	Alan Devonshire	LM	14(6)		7		4		October 1976	Southall
1	(England)	Phil Parkes	GK	13		3		1		February 1979	Queens Park Rangers
5	(England)	Paul Hilton	CB	9 (2)		0 (1)		2		1984	Bury
8	(Scotland)	Frank McAvennie	CF	8 (1)						March 1989	Celtic
Other Players
11	(England)	Stewart Robson	M	6				1		January 1987	Arsenal
2	(Scotland)	Ray Stewart	RB	5 (1)	2	2		1	1	September 1979	Dundee United
5	(England)	Gary Strodder	CB	4 (3)		2 (2)		1		March 1987	Lincoln
1	(Scotland)	Tom McAlister	GK	2						1981	Bristol Rovers
12	(Scotland)	Tommy McQueen	LB	0 (2)						March 1987	Aberdeen

== Transfers ==
=== Transfers in ===
Date	Position	Name	From	Fee
	F	David Kelly	Walsall	
	G	Allen McKnight	Celtic	
March 1989	F	Frank McAvennie	Celtic	£1,250,000

=== Transfers out ===
Date	Position	Name	From	Fee
	F	Tony Cottee	Everton	£2,200,000

== See also ==
- West Ham United F.C. by season
