= 1986–87 West Ham United F.C. season =

English football team season

West Ham United
1986–87 season
- Chairman: Len Cearns
- Manager: John Lyall
- Stadium: Boleyn Ground
- First Division: 15th
- FA Cup: Fifth round
- League Cup: Quarter-finals
- Full Members' Cup: Third round
- Top goalscorer: League: Tony Cottee (22); All: Cottee (29)
- Highest home attendance: 29,807 (vs Liverpool, 6 September 1986)
- Lowest home attendance: 13,514 (vs Sheffield Wednesday, 24 March 1987)
- Average home league attendance: 20,545
Home colours

For the 1986–87 West Ham United F.C. season in English football, West Ham United finished 15th in the league.

== Season summary ==
John Lyall had made no signings during the close season, and it stayed that way until Stewart Robson was added in January. He was joined two months later by other new signings Gary Strodder, Tommy McQueen and Ireland international Liam Brady.

In this season which saw many player ravaged by injury, several academy players got their chance to play, including Kevin Keen, Paul Ince and future captain Steve Potts.

The West Ham fans were so disappointed with the team's underachievement during the season that Billy Bonds was voted Hammer of the Year, even though he only made 17 league and 7 cup appearances for the team.

Tony Cottee was the club's top scorer with 22 league goals and 28 in all competitions, but his strike partner Frank McAvennie disappointed with just seven league goals (11 in all competitions) after being the top flight's second-highest scorer the previous campaign. This was a large factor in the Hammers finishing a lowly 15th in the league, just a year after finishing third and being just four points short of their first top division title.

== League table ==
| Pos | Team | Pld | W | D | L | GF | GA | GD | Pts |
|---|---|---|---|---|---|---|---|---|---|
| 13 | Sheffield Wednesday | 42 | 13 | 13 | 16 | 58 | 59 | −1 | 52 |
| 14 | Chelsea | 42 | 13 | 13 | 16 | 53 | 64 | −11 | 52 |
| 15 | West Ham United | 42 | 14 | 10 | 18 | 52 | 67 | −15 | 52 |
| 16 | Queens Park Rangers | 42 | 13 | 11 | 18 | 48 | 64 | −16 | 50 |
| 17 | Newcastle United | 42 | 12 | 11 | 19 | 47 | 65 | −18 | 47 |

Source: World Football
Rules for classification: 1) Points; 2) Goal difference; 3) Goals scored

== Results ==
West Ham United's score comes first

=== Football League First Division ===
| Date | Opponent | Venue | Result | Attendance | Scorers |
|---|---|---|---|---|---|
| 23 August 1986 | Coventry City | H | 1–0 | 21,368 | Gale |
| 25 August 1986 | Manchester United | A | 3–2 | 43,306 | McAvennie (2), Devonshire |
| 30 August 1986 | Oxford United | A | 0–0 | 11,684 | |
| 2 September 1986 | Nottingham Forest | H | 1–2 | 21,305 | McAvennie |
| 6 September 1986 | Liverpool | H | 2–5 | 29,807 | Stewart (pen), Cottee |
| 13 September 1986 | Queens Park Rangers | A | 3–2 | 19,257 | Cottee (3) |
| 20 September 1986 | Luton Town | H | 2–0 | 19,133 | Parris, Gale |
| 27 September 1986 | Sheffield Wednesday | A | 2–2 | 25,715 | Martin, Orr |
| 4 October 1986 | Watford | A | 2–2 | 17,120 | Dickens, McAvennie |
| 11 October 1986 | Chelsea | H | 5–3 | 26,859 | McAvennie, Stewart (2 pen), Cottee (2) |
| 18 October 1986 | Norwich City | A | 1–1 | 22,884 | Goddard |
| 25 October 1986 | Charlton Athletic | H | 1–3 | 24,141 | Cottee |
| 2 November 1986 | Everton | H | 1–0 | 19,094 | Dickens |
| 8 November 1986 | Arsenal | A | 0–0 | 36,084 | |
| 15 November 1986 | Wimbledon | A | 1–0 | 19,094 | Cottee |
| 22 November 1986 | Aston Villa | H | 1–1 | 21,959 | Cottee |
| 30 November 1986 | Newcastle United | A | 0–4 | 22,077 | |
| 6 December 1986 | Southampton | H | 3–1 | 18,111 | Ince, Devonshire, Cottee (pen) |
| 13 December 1986 | Manchester City | A | 1–3 | 19,067 | Martin |
| 20 December 1986 | Queens Park Rangers | H | 1–1 | 17,290 | Cottee (pen) |
| 26 December 1986 | Tottenham Hotspur | A | 0–4 | 39,019 | |
| 27 December 1986 | Wimbledon | H | 2–3 | 19,122 | Cottee, Hilton |
| 1 January 1987 | Leicester City | H | 4–1 | 16,625 | Cottee (2), Dickens, McAvennie |
| 3 January 1987 | Liverpool | A | 0–1 | 41,286 | |
| 24 January 1987 | Coventry City | A | 3–1 | 14,191 | Cottee (3) |
| 7 February 1987 | Oxford United | H | 0–1 | 15,220 | |
| 14 February 1987 | Nottingham Forest | A | 1–1 | 19,373 | Stewart (pen) |
| 28 February 1987 | Luton Town | A | 1–2 | 11,101 | Cottee |
| 7 March 1987 | Charlton Athletic | A | 1–2 | 10,100 | Robson |
| 14 March 1987 | Norwich City | H | 0–2 | 21,531 | |
| 21 March 1987 | Chelsea | A | 0–1 | 25,386 | |
| 24 March 1987 | Sheffield Wednesday | H | 0–2 | 13,514 | |
| 28 March 1987 | Watford | H | 1–0 | 16,485 | Parris |
| 8 April 1987 | Arsenal | H | 3–1 | 26,174 | Cottee (2; 1 pen), Brady |
| 11 April 1987 | Everton | A | 0–4 | 35,731 | |
| 14 April 1987 | Manchester United | H | 0–0 | 23,486 | |
| 18 April 1987 | Leicester City | A | 0–2 | 10,434 | |
| 20 April 1987 | Tottenham Hotspur | H | 2–1 | 23,971 | McAvennie, Cottee (pen) |
| 25 April 1987 | Aston Villa | A | 0–4 | 13,584 | |
| 2 May 1987 | Newcastle United | H | 1–1 | 17,844 | Ward |
| 4 May 1987 | Southampton | A | 0–1 | 16,810 | |
| 9 May 1987 | Manchester City | H | 2–0 | 18,413 | Cottee, Brady |

=== FA Cup ===
| Round | Date | Opponent | Venue | Result | Attendance | Goalscorers |
|---|---|---|---|---|---|---|
| R3 | 10 January 1987 | Orient | A | 1–1 | 19,225 | Hilton |
| R3R | 31 January 1987 | Orient | H | 4–1 | 19,424 | Parris, Keen, McAvennie, Cottee |
| R4 | 9 February 1987 | Sheffield United | H | 4–0 | 17,194 | McAvennie (2), Robson, Gale |
| R5 | 21 February 1987 | Sheffield Wednesday | A | 1–1 | | McAvennie 10' |
| R5R | 25 February 1987 | Sheffield Wednesday | H | 0–2 | | |

=== League Cup ===
| Round | Date | Opponent | Venue | Result | Attendance | Goalscorers |
|---|---|---|---|---|---|---|
| R2 1st leg | 23 September 1986 | Preston North End | A | 1–1 | 13,153 | Ward |
| R2 2nd leg | 7 October 1986 | Preston North End | H | 4–1 (won 5–2 on agg) | 12,742 | Cottee (3), Dickens |
| R3 | 29 October 1986 | Watford | A | 3–2 | 17,523 | Goddard, Dickens, Ward |
| R4 | 18 November 1986 | Oxford United | H | 1–0 | 20,530 | Cottee (pen) |
| R5 | 27 January 1987 | Tottenham Hotspur | H | 1–1 | 29,477 | Cottee |
| R5R | 2 February 1987 | Tottenham Hotspur | A | 0–5 | 41,995 | |

== Squad ==
| Number | | Player | Position | Lge Apps | Lge Gls | FAC Apps | FAC Gls | LC Apps | LC Gls | Date Signed | Previous club |
West Ham United 1986–87 First XI
| 1 | (England) | Phil Parkes | GK | 33 | | 5 | | 6 | | February 1979 | Queens Park Rangers |
| 2 | (Scotland) | Ray Stewart | RB | 23 | 4 | 3 | | 3 | | September 1979 | Dundee United |
| 3 | (England) | George Parris | LB | 35(1) | 1 | 5 | 1 | 6 | | 1985 | Academy |
| 4 | (England) | Tony Gale | CB | 32 | 2 | 4 | 1 | 4 | | August 1983 | Fulham |
| 5 | (England) | Billy Bonds (Captain) (Hammer of the Year) | CB | 13(4) | | 3 (1) | | 1 (2) | | 1967 | Charlton |
| 6 | (England) | Alan Devonshire | LM | 20 | 2 | 3 | | 4 | | October 1976 | Southall |
| 7 | (England) | Mark Ward | RM | 37 | 1 | 5 | | 6 | 2 | August 1985 | Oldham Athletic |
| 8 | (Scotland) | Frank McAvennie | CF | 36 | 7 | 4 | 4 | 5 | | June 1985 | St Mirren |
| 9 | (England) | Alan Dickens | CM | 31(5) | 3 | 2 (1) | | 4 | 2 | 1982 | Academy |
| 10 | (England) | Tony Cottee | CF | 42 | 22 | 5 | 1 | 6 | 5 | September 1982 | Academy |
| 11 | (Scotland) | Neil Orr | CM | 21(1) | 1 | 1 | | 4 | | January 1982 | Morton |
Important Players
| 11 | (England) | Stewart Robson | M | 18 | 2 | 3 | 1 | 2 | | January 1987 | Arsenal |
| 5 | (England) | Alvin Martin | CB | 16 | 2 | 1 | | 3 | | July 1976 | Academy |
| 5 | (England) | Paul Hilton | CB | 15(1) | 1 | 2 | 1 | 4 (1) | | 1984 | Bury |
| 2 | (England) | Steve Walford | LB | 13(1) | | 3 | | 4 (1) | | August 1983 | Norwich |
| 6 | (Republic of Ireland) | Liam Brady | M | 12 | 2 | | | | | March 1987 | Ascoli |
| 5 | (England) | Gary Strodder | CB | 12 | | | | | | March 1987 | Lincoln |
| 9 | (England) | Geoff Pike | M | 10(1) | | 4 | | 1 | | September 1974 | Academy |
| 6 | (England) | Kevin Keen | M | 7 (6) | | 1 (1) | 1 | 2 | | 1986 | Academy |
| 6 | (England) | Paul Ince | M | 7 (3) | 1 | 1 | | | | 1986 | Academy |
Other Players
| 1 | (Scotland) | Tom McAlister | GK | 9 | | | | | | 1981 | Bristol Rovers |
| 3 | (Scotland) | Tommy McQueen | LB | 9 | | | | | | March 1987 | Aberdeen |
| 2 | (England) | Steve Potts | RB | 8 | | | | | | May 1984 | Academy |
| 8 | (England) | Paul Goddard | CF | 3 (1) | 1 | | | 1 | 1 | 1980 | Queens Park Rangers |
| 12 | (Republic of Ireland) | Eamonn Dolan | CF | 0 (1) | | | | | | 1986 | Academy |
