= 1987–88 West Ham United F.C. season =

English football team season

West Ham United
1987–88 season
- Chairman: Len Cearns
- Manager: John Lyall
- Stadium: Boleyn Ground
- First Division: 16th
- FA Cup: Fourth round
- League Cup: Second round
- Top goalscorer: League: Tony Cottee (13); All: Cottee (15)
- Highest home attendance: 29,865 (vs Liverpool, 5 September 1987)
- Lowest home attendance: 14,975 (vs Southampton, 5 December 1987)
Home colours

For the 1987–88 West Ham United F.C. season in English football, West Ham United finished 16th in the league.

== Season summary ==
Again John Lyall waited until three quarters of the season had passed before bringing any new signings to the club. Even so, the two players he did eventually bring in, Julian Dicks and Leroy Rosenior, would play a major part in helping the club to just avoid relegation for the second season running.

Alan Dickens had to play most of the season as a striker as Frank McAvennie had signed for Celtic without a replacement being found until Rosenior's arrival.

West Ham finally finished in 16th place in the First Division.

Stewart Robson, a midfielder, won the club player of the year award, although Tony Cottee continued to score the most goals, with 13 in the league and 15 in all competitions. However, Cottee would be sold to Everton for a national record £2.2 million by the start of the following season, leaving manager Lyall with a big gap to fill in the forward positions as he had lost his two highest goalscorers within a year of each other.

== League table ==
Pos	Team	Pld	W	D	L	GF	GA	GD	Pts	Qualification or relegation
14	Norwich City	40	12	9	19	40	52	−12	45	
15	Derby County	40	10	13	17	35	45	−10	43	
16	West Ham United	40	9	15	16	40	52	−12	42	
17	Charlton Athletic	40	9	15	16	38	52	−14	42	
18	Chelsea (R)	40	9	15	16	50	68	−18	42	Qualified for Second Division play-offs

Source: World Football
Rules for classification: 1) Points; 2) Goal difference; 3) Goals scored
(R) Relegated

== Results ==
West Ham United's score comes first

=== Football League First Division ===
Date	Opponent	Venue	Result	Attendance	Scorers
15 August 1987	Queens Park Rangers	H	0–3	22,881	
22 August 1987	Luton Town	A	2–2	18,073	Brady, Stewart (pen)
29 August 1987	Norwich City	H	2–0	16,394	Cottee (2)
31 August 1987	Portsmouth	A	1–2	16,104	Strodder
5 September 1987	Liverpool	H	1–1	29,865	Cottee
12 September 1987	Wimbledon	A	1–1	8,507	Cottee
19 September 1987	Tottenham Hotspur	H	0–1	27,750	
26 September 1987	Arsenal	A	0–1	40,127	
3 October 1987	Derby County	H	1–1	17,226	Brady
10 October 1987	Charlton Athletic	H	1–1	15,757	Ince
17 October 1987	Oxford United	A	2–1	9,092	Caton (o.g.), Cottee
25 October 1987	Manchester United	H	1–1	19,863	Stewart (pen)
31 October 1987	Watford	A	2–1	14,427	Dickens, Cottee
7 November 1987	Sheffield Wednesday	H	0–1	16,277	
14 November 1987	Everton	A	1–3	29,405	Hilton
21 November 1987	Nottingham Forest	H	3–2	17,216	Cottee (2), Stewart (pen)
28 November 1987	Coventry City	A	0–0	16,740	
5 December 1987	Southampton	H	2–1	14,975	Keen, Dickens
12 December 1987	Chelsea	A	1–1	22,850	Parris
19 December 1987	Newcastle United	H	2–1	18,679	Robson, Ince
26 December 1987	Wimbledon	H	1–2	18,605	Stewart (pen)
28 December 1987	Tottenham Hotspur	A	1–2	39,456	Hilton
1 January 1988	Norwich City	A	1–4	20,069	Cottee
2 January 1988	Luton Town	H	1–1	16,716	Ince
16 January 1988	Queens Park Rangers	A	1–0	14,509	Dickens
6 February 1988	Liverpool	A	0–0	42,049	
13 February 1988	Portsmouth	H	1–1	18,639	Cottee
27 February 1988	Derby County	A	0–1	16,301	
5 March 1988	Oxford United	H	1–1	14,980	Ward
12 March 1988	Charlton Athletic	A	0–3	8,118	
19 March 1988	Watford	H	1–0	16,051	Rosenior
26 March 1988	Manchester United	A	1–3	37,269	Rosenior
2 April 1988	Sheffield Wednesday	A	1–2	18,435	Rosenior
4 April 1988	Everton	H	0–0	21,195	
12 April 1988	Arsenal	H	0–1	26,746	
20 April 1988	Nottingham Forest	A	0–0	15,775	
23 April 1988	Coventry City	H	1–1	17,733	Cottee
30 April 1988	Southampton	A	1–2	15,652	Cottee
7 May 1988	Chelsea	H	4–1	28,521	Rosenior (2), Hilton, Cottee
14 May 1988	Newcastle United	A	1–2	23,731	Robson

=== FA Cup ===
Round	Date	Opponent	Venue	Result	Attendance	Goalscorers
R3	9 January 1988	Charlton Athletic	H	2–0	22,043	Brady, Cottee
R4	30 January 1988	Queens Park Rangers	A	1–3	23,651	Cottee

=== League Cup ===
Round	Date	Opponent	Venue	Result	Attendance	Goalscorers
R2 1st leg	22 September 1987	Barnsley	A	0–0	10,330	
R2 2nd leg	6 October 1987	Barnsley	H	2–5aet (lost 2–5 on agg)	12,403	Robson, Keen

== Squad ==
Number		Player	Position	Lge Apps	Lge Gls	FAC Apps	FAC Gls	LC Apps	LC Gls	Date Signed	Previous club
West Ham United 1987-88 First XI
1	(Scotland)	Tom McAlister	GK	39		2		2		1981	Bristol Rovers
2	(Scotland)	Ray Stewart	RB	33	4	2				September 1979	Dundee United
3	(England)	George Parris	LB	27(3)	1			2		1985	Academy
4	(England)	Billy Bonds (Captain)	CB	22		2				1967	Charlton Athletic
5	(England)	Gary Strodder	CB	27(3)	1	2		2		March 1987	Lincoln City
6	(Republic of Ireland)	Liam Brady	LM	21(1)	2	2	1	2		March 1987	Ascoli
7	(England)	Mark Ward	RM	37	1	2		2		August 1985	Oldham Athletic
8	(England)	Alan Dickens	F	25(3)	3	1		0 (1)		1982	Academy
9	(England)	Paul Ince	CM	26(2)	3	0 (1)		2		1986	Academy
10	(England)	Tony Cottee	CF	40	13	2	2	2		September 1982	Academy
11	(England)	Stewart Robson (Hammer of the Year)	CM	37	2	2		2	1	January 1987	Arsenal
Important Players
6	(England)	Kevin Keen	M	19(4)	1			1	1	1986	Academy
6	(England)	Tony Gale	CB	17(1)		2				August 1983	Fulham
5	(England)	Alvin Martin	CB	15				2		July 1976	Academy
3	(Scotland)	Tommy McQueen	LB	10(2)		1		1 (1)		March 1987	Aberdeen
5	(England)	Paul Hilton	CB	9 (5)	3	1 (1)		0 (1)		1984	Bury
9	(England)	Leroy Rosenior	CF	9	5					March 1988	Fulham
Other Players
8	(Scotland)	Frank McAvennie	CF	8				1		June 1985	St Mirren
3	(England)	Julian Dicks	LB	8						March 1988	Birmingham City
2	(England)	Steve Potts	D	7 (1)		1		1		May 1984	Academy
12	(Republic of Ireland)	Eamonn Dolan	CF	1 (3)						1986	Academy
1	(England)	Phil Parkes	GK	1						February 1979	Queens Park Rangers
6	(England)	Alan Devonshire	LM	1						October 1976	Southall
4	(Scotland)	Neil Orr	CM	1						January 1982	Morton
12	(England)	Stuart Slater	M/F	0 (2)						1987	Academy
