= 1989–90 West Ham United F.C. season =

English football team season

West Ham United
1989–90 season
- Chairman: Len Cearns, Martin Cearns
- Manager: Lou Macari, Billy Bonds
- Stadium: Boleyn Ground
- Second Division: 7th
- FA Cup: Third round
- League Cup: Semi-finals
- Top goalscorer: League: Jimmy Quinn (13); All: Quinn & Julian Dicks (13)
- Highest home attendance: 25,892 (v Newcastle United, 11 November 1989)
- Lowest home attendance: 12,187 (v Birmingham City, 4 October 1989)
- Average home league attendance: 20,278
Home colours

For the 1989–90 West Ham United F.C. season in English football, West Ham United finished 7th in the league.

== Season summary ==
In the second game of the season, the West Ham fans chanted "We hate Paul Ince" after they discovered through a national newspaper of the player's transfer to Manchester United. Ince had reportedly been a transfer target for Alex Ferguson since the end of the previous campaign, the transfer finally being completed on 14 September 1989, by which time Ince had already played a Second Division game for the Hammers.

With the dismissal of long-serving manager John Lyall on 5 June 1989, speculation mounted about who was going to succeed him. AFC Bournemouth manager and former Hammers player Harry Redknapp were strongly linked to the vacancy, but Swindon Town's Lou Macari (who had taken the Wiltshire club to the verge of the First Division just three years after promotion from the Fourth Division) was unveiled as the club's new manager on 3 July 1989.

Macari lasted less than a year as manager. Amid allegations that he was involved in illegal payments at Swindon Town (a scandal which saw Swindon's promotion to the First Division being withdrawn at the end of the 1989–90 season), he resigned on 18 February 1990. Club legend Billy Bonds was appointed manager in his place and saw the Hammers complete their impressive run to the League Cup semi-finals for the second season in succession, but seventh place in the final league table was not quite enough for a play-off place. It could very well have been a different story had key striker Frank McAvennie not been absent for almost all of the campaign, breaking his leg on the opening day of the season against Stoke City and only managing four more league appearances that campaign when he made his comeback.

However, some new signings, including Ludek Miklosko, Trevor Morley and Ian Bishop, went on to become West Ham legends.

== Results ==
West Ham United's score comes first

=== Football League Second Division ===
Date	Opponent	Venue	Result	Attendance	Scorers
19 August 1989	Stoke City	A	1–1	16,058	Keen
23 August 1989	Bradford City	H	2–0	19,914	Slater (2)
26 August 1989	Plymouth Argyle	H	3–2	20,231	Kelly, Allen, Keen
2 September 1989	Hull City	A	1–1	9,235	Ward
9 September 1989	Swindon Town	H	1–1	21,469	Allen
16 September 1989	Brighton & Hove Albion	A	0–3	12,689	
23 September 1989	Watford	H	1–0	20,728	Dicks (pen)
26 September 1989	Portsmouth	A	1–0	12,632	Rosenior
30 September 1989	West Bromwich Albion	H	2–3	19,842	Dolan, Parris
7 October 1989	Leeds United	H	0–1	23,539	
14 October 1989	Sheffield United	A	2–0	20,822	Ward (2; 1 pen)
18 October 1989	Sunderland	H	5–0	20,901	Allen, Slater, Keen, Dolan (2)
21 October 1989	Port Vale	A	2–2	8,899	Keen, Slater
28 October 1989	Oxford United	H	3–2	19,177	Parris, Slater, Dicks
1 November 1989	AFC Bournemouth	A	1–1	9,979	Strodder
4 November 1989	Wolverhampton Wanderers	A	0–1	22,231	
11 November 1989	Newcastle United	H	0–0	25,892	
18 November 1989	Middlesbrough	H	2–0	18,720	Slater, Dicks (p)
25 November 1989	Blackburn Rovers	A	4–5	10,215	Brady, Dicks (p), Slater, Ward
2 December 1989	Stoke City	H	0–0	17,704	
9 December 1989	Bradford City	A	1–2	9,257	Ward
16 December 1989	Oldham Athletic	H	0–2	14,960	
26 December 1989	Ipswich Town	A	0–1	24,365	
30 December 1989	Leicester City	A	0–1	16,925	
1 January 1990	Barnsley	H	4–2	18,391	Allen, Keen (2), Dicks (p)
13 January 1990	Plymouth Argyle	A	1–1	11,671	Quinn
20 January 1990	Hull City	H	1–2	16,847	Morley
10 February 1990	Brighton & Hove Albion	H	3–1	19,101	Quinn, Dicks
18 February 1990	Swindon Town	A	2–2	16,105	Quinn (2)
24 February 1990	Blackburn Rovers	H	1–1	20,054	Quinn
3 March 1990	Middlesbrough	A	1–0	23,617	Allen
10 March 1990	Portsmouth	H	2–1	20,961	Allen, Dicks (p)
13 March 1990	Watford	A	1–0	15,683	Morley
17 March 1990	Leeds United	A	2–3	32,536	Morley, Chapman (o.g.)
21 March 1990	Sheffield United	H	5–0	21,629	Morley, Quinn (3), Allen
24 March 1990	Sunderland	A	3–4	13,896	Quinn (2), Morley
31 March 1990	Port Vale	H	2–2	20,507	Morley, Gale
4 April 1990	West Bromwich Albion	A	3–1	11,556	Quinn, Bishop, Keen
7 April 1990	Oxford United	A	2–0	8,371	Morley, Quinn
11 April 1990	AFC Bournemouth	H	4–1	20,202	Miller (o.g.), Bishop, Dicks (p), Allen
14 April 1990	Barnsley	A	1–1	10,344	Morley
17 April 1990	Ipswich Town	H	2–0	25,178	Allen, Keen
21 April 1990	Oldham Athletic	A	0–3	12,190	
28 April 1990	Newcastle United	A	1–2	31,496	Dicks (p)
2 May 1990	Leicester City	H	3–1	17,939	Rosenior, Keen, Morley
5 May 1990	Wolverhampton Wanderers	H	4–0	22,509	Keen, Morley, Robson, Brady

=== FA Cup ===
Round	Date	Opponent	Venue	Result	Attendance	Goalscorers
R3	6 January 1990	Torquay United	A	0–1	5,342	

=== League Cup ===
Round	Date	Opponent	Venue	Result	Attendance	Goalscorers
R2 1st leg	19 September 1989	Birmingham City	A	2–1	10,987	Allen, Slater
R2 2nd leg	4 October 1989	Birmingham City	H	1–1 (won 3–2 on agg)	12,187	Dicks
R3	25 October 1989	Aston Villa	A	0–0	20,989	
R3R	8 November 1989	Aston Villa	H	1–0	23,833	Dicks
R4	22 November 1989	Wimbledon	H	1–0	24,746	Allen 81'
QF	17 January 1990	Derby County	H	1–1	25,035	Dicks
QFR	24 January 1990	Derby County	A	0–0 aet	22,510	
QF2R	31 January 1990	Derby County	H	2–1	25,166	Slater, Keen
SF 1st leg	14 February 1990	Oldham Athletic	A	0–6	19,263	
SF 2nd leg	7 March 1990	Oldham Athletic	H	3–0 (lost 3–6 on agg)	15,431	Martin, Dicks (pen), Kelly

== Squad ==
Number		Player	Position	Lge Apps	Lge Gls	FAC Apps	FAC Gls	LC Apps	LC Gls	Date Signed	Previous club
West Ham United 1989-90 First XI
1	(England)	Phil Parkes	GK	22		1		9		February 1979	Queens Park Rangers
2	(England)	Steve Potts	RB	30(2)		1		8		May 1984	Academy
3	(England)	Julian Dicks (Hammer of the Year)	LB	40	9	1		9	4	March 1988	Birmingham City
4	(England)	Tony Gale	CB	36	1	1		7		August 1983	Fulham
5	(England)	Alvin Martin (Captain)	CB	31		1		10	1	July 1976	Academy
6	(England)	Kevin Keen	M	43(1)	10	1		10	1	1986	Academy
7	(Republic of Ireland)	Liam Brady	M	25(8)	2			8 (2)		March 1987	Ascoli
8	(England)	Stuart Slater	F	40	7			9 (1)	2	1987	Academy
9	(Northern Ireland)	Jimmy Quinn	CF	18(3)	13	1				December 1989	Bradford City
10	(England)	Martin Allen	M	39	9	1		6	2	August 1989	Queens Park Rangers
11	(England)	George Parris	M	35(3)	2	1		9		1985	Academy
Important Players
5	(England)	Colin Foster	CB	20(2)						1989	Nottingham Forest
11	(England)	Trevor Morley	CF	18(1)	10	1				December 1989	Manchester City
1	(Czechoslovakia)	Ludek Miklosko	GK	18				1		February 1990	Banik Ostrava
7	(England)	Mark Ward	RM	17(2)	5			4		August 1985	Oldham Athletic
4	(England)	Gary Strodder	CB	16	1			5		March 1987	Lincoln City
8	(England)	Ian Bishop	M	13(4)	2	1				December 1989	Manchester City
8	(Republic of Ireland)	David Kelly	CF	8 (8)	1			5 (2)	1	1988	Walsall
Other Players
9	(Republic of Ireland)	Eamonn Dolan	CF	8 (2)	3			4		1986	Academy
2	(England)	Stewart Robson	M	7	1			3		January 1987	Arsenal
1	(England)	Perry Suckling	GK	6						December 1989	Crystal Palace
3	(Scotland)	Tommy McQueen	LB	5 (2)				1 (2)		March 1987	Aberdeen
9	(England)	Leroy Rosenior	CF	4 (1)	2	0 (1)		2		March 1988	Fulham
6	(England)	Alan Devonshire	LM	3 (4)				0 (3)		October 1976	Southall
11	(England)	Justin Fashanu	F	2				0 (1)		November 1989	Manchester City
12	(Scotland)	Frank McAvennie	CF	1 (4)						March 1989	Celtic
11	(England)	Paul Ince	CM	1						1986	Academy
14	(England)	Paul Kelly	M	0 (1)						1989	Academy
12	(Scotland)	Ralph Milne	M					0 (1)		January 1990	Manchester United
