= 1984–85 West Ham United F.C. season =

English football team season

West Ham United
1984–85 season
- Chairman: Len Cearns
- Manager: John Lyall
- Stadium: Boleyn Ground
- First Division: 16th
- FA Cup: Sixth round
- League Cup: Third round
- Top goalscorer: League: Tony Cottee (17); All: Cottee (24)
Home colours

The 1984–85 West Ham United F.C. season was West Ham's fourth season in the First Division since their return in 1981. The club was managed by John Lyall and the team captain was Billy Bonds.

== Season summary ==
The season started well for West Ham and by the fifth game they were in second place in the league. They maintained moderate form and by the end of 1984 were in 12th place. However their form slumped considerably in 1985 and although they never occupied one of the relegation places, they spent several weeks just one place above. Two wins in the last three games saw them rise to 16th, only two points above a relegation place. Tony Cottee was the top scorer with 24 goals in all competitions. The next highest scorer was Paul Goddard with 14. Cottee also made the most appearance, 49 in all competitions. The season also saw the debut of Steve Potts and the last game for West Ham by Frank Lampard.

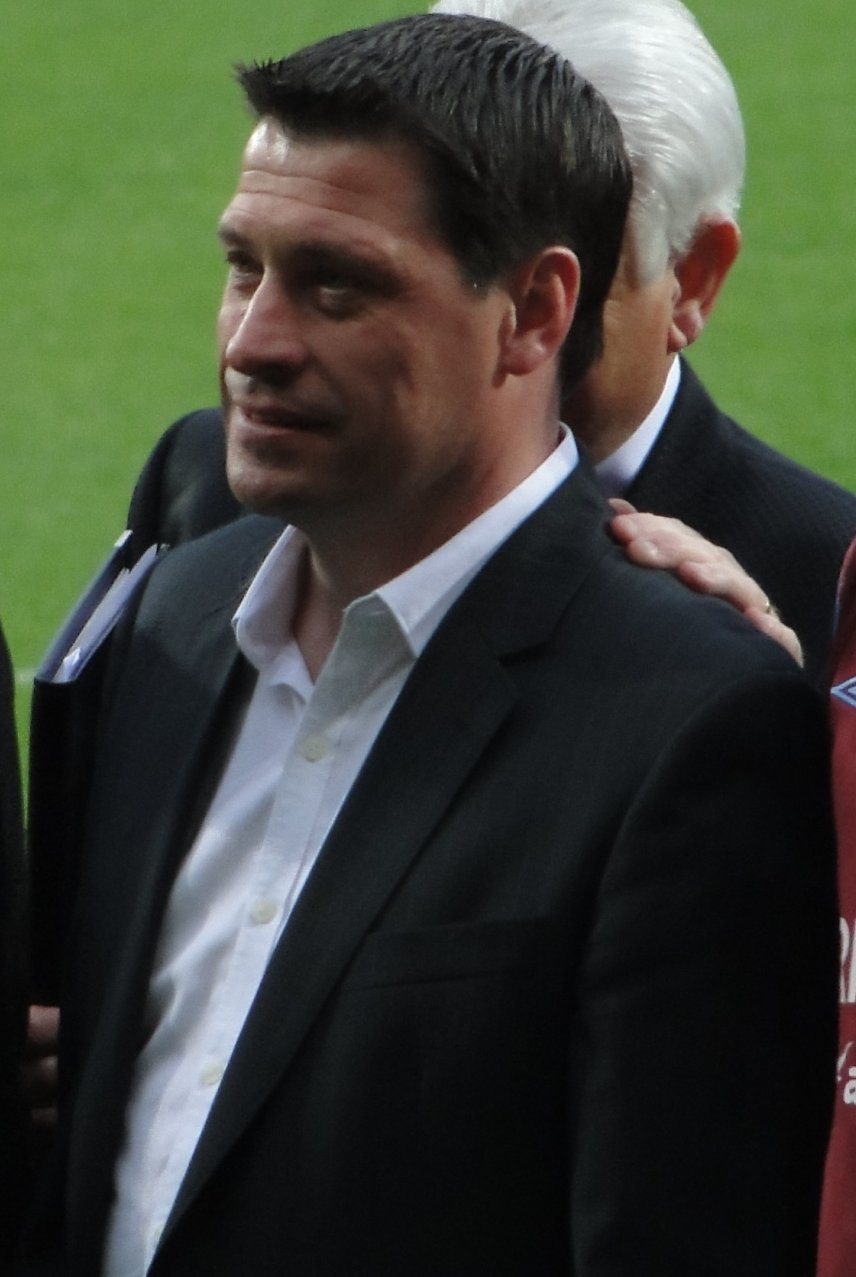
Leading scorer, Tony Cottee

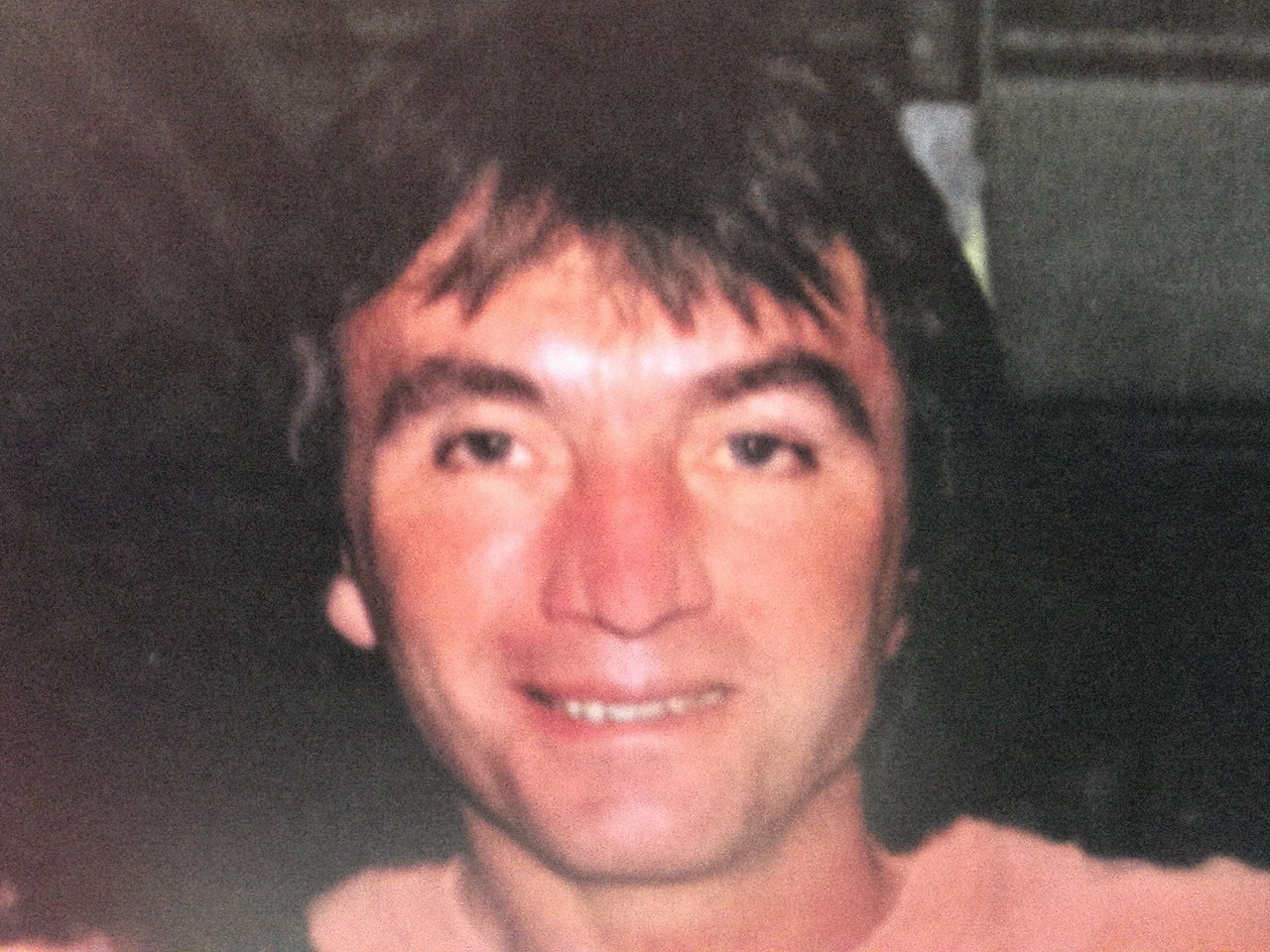
Club captain, Billy Bonds

== League table ==
Pos	Team	Pld	W	D	L	GF	GA	GD	Pts
14	Newcastle United	42	13	13	16	55	70	−15	52
15	Leicester City	42	15	6	21	65	73	−8	51
16	West Ham United	42	13	12	17	51	68	−17	51
17	Ipswich Town	42	13	11	18	46	57	−11	50
18	Coventry City	42	15	5	22	47	64	−17	50

Source: World Football
Rules for classification: 1) Points; 2) Goal difference; 3) Goals scored

== Results ==
West Ham United's score comes first

=== Legend ===
Win	Draw	Loss

=== Football League First Division ===
Date	Opponent	Venue	Result	Attendance	Scorers
25 August 1984	Ipswich Town	H	0–0	19,032	
27 August 1984	Liverpool	A	0–3	32,633	
1 September 1984	Southampton	A	3–2	18,448	Goddard (2), Dickens
4 September 1984	Coventry City	H	3–1	14,949	Stewart (2 pens), Cottee
8 September 1984	Watford	H	2–0	20,277	Barnes, Sinnott (og)
15 September 1984	Chelsea	A	0–3	32,411	
22 September 1984	Nottingham Forest	H	0–0	17,434	
29 September 1984	Newcastle United	A	1–1	29,966	Allen
6 October 1984	Leicester City	H	3–1	15,306	Stewart, Cottee, Bonds
13 October 1984	Manchester United	A	1–5	47,599	Goddard
20 October 1984	Stoke City	A	4–2	10,054	Martin, Goddard, Cottee, Berry (og)
27 October 1984	Arsenal	H	3–1	33,218	Goodard, Cottee, Pike
3 November 1984	Aston Villa	A	0–0	15,709	
10 November 1984	Everton	H	0–1	24,089	
17 November 1984	Sunderland	H	1–0	15,204	Cottee
24 November 1984	Luton Town	A	2–2	10,789	Martin, Whitton
1 December 1984	West Bromwich Albion	H	0–2	15,572	
8 December 1984	Norwich City	A	0–1	13,485	
15 December 1984	Sheffield Wednesday	H	0–0	14,896	
22 December 1984	Southampton	H	2–3	14,221	Cottee (2)
26 December 1984	Tottenham Hotspur	A	2–2	37,187	Cottee, Goddard
29 December 1984	Coventry City	A	2–1	10,732	Cottee (2)
1 January 1985	Queens Park Rangers	H	1–3	20,857	Brush
2 February 1985	Newcastle United	H	1–1	17,807	Allen
23 February 1985	Aston Villa	H	1–2	14,855	Goddard
2 March 1985	Arsenal	A	1–2	25,818	Cottee
15 March 1985	Manchester United	H	2–2	16,674	Cottee, Duxbury (og)
23 March 1985	Leicester City	A	0–1	11,375	
30 March 1985	Nottingham Forest	A	2–1	13,560	Goddard, Cottee
2 April 1985	Watford	A	0–5	17,839	
6 April 1985	Tottenham Hotspur	H	1–1	24,435	Dickens
8 April 1985	Queens Park Rangers	A	2–4	16,085	Cottee (2)
13 April 1985	Chelsea	H	1–1	19,003	Cottee
20 April 1985	Sunderland	A	1–0	15,622	Goddard
27 April 1985	Luton Town	H	0–0	17,303	
4 May 1985	West Bromwich Albion	A	1–5	8,834	Stewart
6 May 1985	Norwich City	H	1–0	16,233	Barnes
8 May 1985	Everton	A	0–3	32,606	
11 May 1985	Sheffield Wednesday	A	1–2	24,314	Cottee
14 May 1985	Stoke City	H	5–1	13,362	Stewart, Bonds (2), Pike, Hilton
17 May 1985	Ipswich Town	A	1–0	19,278	Cottee
20 May 1985	Liverpool	H	0–3	22,369	

=== FA Cup ===
Round	Date	Opponent	Venue	Result	Attendance	Goalscorers
R3	5 January 1985	Port Vale	H	4–1	11,452	Dickens, Goddard (3)
R4	4 February 1985	Norwich City	H	2–1	20,098	Stewart, Pike
R5	4 March 1985	Wimbledon	A	1–1	13,500	Cottee
R5 Replay	6 March 1985	Wimbledon	H	5–1	20,258	Allen, Cottee (3), Dickens
R6	9 March 1985	Manchester United	A	2–4	46,769	Hogg (og), Allen

=== League Cup ===
Round	Date	Opponent	Venue	Result	Attendance	Goalscorers
R2 First Leg	25 September 1984	Bristol City	A	2–2	15,894	Walford, Cottee
R2 Second Leg	9 October 1984	Bristol City	H	6–1 (won 8–3 on agg)	11,376	Walford, Whitton, Cottee (2), Goddard (2)
R3	31 October 1984	Manchester City	A	0–0	20,510	
R3 Replay	6 November 1984	Manchester City	H	1–2	17,462	Whitton

== Squad ==
Note: Flags indicate national team as defined under FIFA eligibility rules; some limited exceptions apply. Players may hold more than one non-FIFA nationality.

Pos.	Nation	Player
MF	ENG	Paul Allen
MF	ENG	Bobby Barnes
DF	ENG	Billy Bonds (captain)
FW	ENG	Greg Campbell
FW	ENG	Tony Cottee
MF	ENG	Alan Devonshire
MF	ENG	Alan Dickens
DF	ENG	Tony Gale
FW	ENG	Paul Goddard
DF	ENG	Paul Hilton
DF	ENG	Frank Lampard
DF	ENG	Alvin Martin

Pos.	Nation	Player
GK	SCO	Tom McAlister
DF	ENG	Keith McPherson
DF	SCO	Neil Orr
GK	ENG	Phil Parkes
MF	ENG	George Parris
MF	ENG	Geoff Pike
DF	ENG	Steve Potts
DF	SCO	Ray Stewart
FW	ENG	Dave Swindlehurst
DF	ENG	Steve Walford
FW	ENG	Steve Whitton
