= 1985–86 West Ham United F.C. season =

English football team season

West Ham United
1985–86 season
- Chairman: Len Cearns
- Manager: John Lyall
- Stadium: Boleyn Ground
- First Division: 3rd
- FA Cup: Sixth round
- League Cup: Third round
- Top goalscorer: League: Frank McAvennie (26); All: Frank McAvennie (28)
- Highest home attendance: 31,121 vs Ipswich Town (30 April 1986)
- Lowest home attendance: 9,282 vs Swansea City (24 September 1985 League Cup)
- Average home league attendance: 21,179
Home colours

The 1985–1986 season saw manager John Lyall lead West Ham United (known as "The Hammers") to their highest ever league finish, coming a close third behind Liverpool and Everton. They won 26 of their 42 games and finished with 84 points, two behind Everton and four behind eventual double winners Liverpool. The Hammers team of 1985–86 became known as The Boys of 86.

== Events of the season ==
=== August ===
The most notable pre-season changes to the West Ham side were midfielder Mark Ward and striker Frank McAvennie, signed from Oldham Athletic and St Mirren respectively.

Both players made their debuts on the opening day of the season in a 1–0 defeat by Birmingham City at St Andrew's. McAvennie played in midfield, but an injury to Paul Goddard gave the Scot the opportunity to establish himself as first choice strike partner to Tony Cottee, who was in his third full season as a regular player despite only being 21.

It was a slow start to the season for the Hammers as they managed just one win from their five games in August, a 3–1 defeat of London rivals Queens Park Rangers in which McAvennie scored his first two goals for the club. He added two more in a 2–2 draw with Liverpool on 31 August. The month ended with West Ham lying 17th in a table led by Manchester United, who had a 100% record.

=== September ===
Things got better for the Hammers in September, as they completed the month unbeaten in the league, beating Leicester City 3–0 and Nottingham Forest 4–2 at Upton Park, and drawing at Southampton, Sheffield Wednesday and Manchester City. They began their Milk Cup involvement by winning 3–0 at home to Swansea City in the second round first leg. The Hammers ended September in 13th place.

=== October ===
October was another successful month, as the Hammers completed an aggregate win over Swansea in the Milk Cup and also managed league successes over Newcastle United, Aston Villa and Ipswich Town which helped them climb to seventh by the end of the month. Manchester United still led the table, 10 points ahead of nearest challengers Liverpool and 15 ahead of the Hammers. Disappointment came in the Milk Cup on 29 October with a third round exit at Old Trafford.

=== November ===
The Hammers muscled in on the title challenge by winning all five of their games in November, bookended by a 2–1 win over defending champions Everton and a 4–0 demolition of relegation-threatened West Bromwich Albion. The Hammers ended the month in third place, a mere five points behind leaders Manchester United, raising hopes that the league title would arrive at the club at long last.

Frank McAvennie was now the Football League's highest scorer with 17 First Division goals.

=== December ===
December was a mixed month for West Ham. They managed wins over Queens Park Rangers and Birmingham, but were held to a goalless draw at Luton Town and then beaten 1–0 by Tottenham Hotspur at White Hart Lane on Boxing Day. The Hammers were still third in the league as 1985 drew to a close, level on points with second placed Liverpool and four adrift of a Manchester United side whose title bid appeared to be slowly falling apart after a blistering start to the season.

=== January ===
1986 began on a high note for the Hammers, as they eliminated neighbours Charlton Athletic from the FA Cup in the third round before winning 1–0 at Leicester in the league the following weekend. However, their title hopes suffered a blow in the next game on 18 January when they lost 3–1 to Liverpool at Anfield. They now found themselves fifth in the league and seven points behind leaders Manchester United, albeit with a game in hand.

The month ended with a goalless home draw against struggling Ipswich in the FA Cup fourth round.

=== February ===
The Hammers' 2–1 win over Manchester United on 2 February proved to be the turning point in the title race, as Ron Atkinson's side were deposed from the top of the table for the first time, allowing Everton go top. The FA Cup replay against Ipswich at Portman Road ended in another draw before West Ham won a second replay 1–0 in extra time. Due to severe weather, however, there was no more action for the Hammers that month.

=== March ===
West Ham went head to head with Manchester United in the race for the double as the two met in the FA Cup fifth round. The first match at Upton Park ended in a 1–1 draw, but the Hammers won the replay 2–0 at Old Trafford. However, the double dream died in the quarter-finals three days later when they were beaten 2–1 at Sheffield Wednesday.

The league title dream also appeared to be on the wane when the Hammers lost their next two games, but they ended the month on a high by avenging Sheffield Wednesday 1–0 before demolishing Chelsea 4–0 at Stamford Bridge (making a huge dent to their London rivals' title ambitions) and beating Tottenham 2–1 at Upton Park.

As March ended, the title challenge was firmly back on track – the Hammers were fifth in the league, 10 points adrift of leaders Liverpool but with the advantage of five games in hand.

=== April ===
April 1986 was one of the most memorable months in the history of West Ham United Football Club.

It began on a disappointing note with a 2–1 defeat at Nottingham Forest, but the Hammers showed no sign of tiredness and went into overdrive by winning eight of their next nine games, including an 8–1 demolition of Newcastle in which Alvin Martin joined the select group of defenders to score a hat-trick, scoring each goal against a different Newcastle goalkeeper!. They ended the month in third place, four points behind leaders Liverpool but with a game in hand. There was still a chance of title glory.

=== May ===
The final Saturday of the league season saw the Hammers win 3–2 at doomed West Bromwich Albion, but on the same day Liverpool sealed the title by winning at Chelsea. West Ham's final match of the season would be a straight shoot-out for second place between them and Everton. The contest was won by Everton, who triumphed 3–1.

Everton's prolific striker Gary Lineker also defeated Frank McAvennie in the contest for the title as First Division leading goalscorer, with Lineker on 30 goals and McAvennie on 26. West Ham had the best home record of all teams in the First Division in the 1985–86 season. Of 21 games they won 17 and lost only two.

There would be no chance of a UEFA Cup challenge the following season, as UEFA voted for the ban on English clubs in European competitions (imposed the previous year in the wake of the Heysel disaster) to continue for a second season. On a more positive note, West Ham held onto their key players for the 1986–87 season, despite a growing trend for the league's top players to move abroad in order to be able to play in European competitions.

== League table ==
Pos	Team	Pld	W	D	L	GF	GA	GD	Pts	Qualification or relegation
1	Liverpool (C)	42	26	10	6	89	37	+52	88	Disqualified from the European Cup
2	Everton (Note: Since the FA Cup winners, Liverpool, would have instead qualified for the European Cup, qualification would have instead been passed down to runners-up Everton.)	42	26	8	8	87	41	+46	86	Disqualified from the European Cup Winners' Cup
3	West Ham United	42	26	6	10	74	40	+34	84	Disqualified from the UEFA Cup
4	Manchester United	42	22	10	10	70	36	+34	76	Disqualified from the UEFA Cup
5	Sheffield Wednesday (Note: Since Everton would have instead qualified for the European Cup Winners' Cup, UEFA Cup qualification would have been passed down to Sheffield Wednesday.)	42	21	10	11	63	54	+9	73	Disqualified from the UEFA Cup

Source: World Football
Rules for classification: 1) Points; 2) Goal difference; 3) Goals scored
(C) Champions

== Results ==
West Ham United's score comes first

=== Football League First Division ===
Date	Opponent	Venue	Result	Attendance	Scorers
17 August 1985	Birmingham City	A	0–1	11,164	
20 August 1985	Queens Park Rangers	H	3–1	15,530	McAvennie (2), Dickens
24 August 1985	Luton Town	H	0–1	14,104	
26 August 1985	Manchester United	A	0–2	50,773	
31 August 1985	Liverpool	H	2–2	19,762	McAvennie (2)
3 September 1985	Southampton	A	1–1	14,477	McAvennie
7 September 1985	Sheffield Wednesday	A	2–2	19,287	McAvennie, Cottee
14 September 1985	Leicester City	H	3–0	12,125	McAvennie, Devonshire, Cottee
21 September 1985	Manchester City	A	2–2	22,001	Cottee, McCarthy (o.g.)
28 September 1985	Nottingham Forest	H	4–2	14,540	Cottee, McAvennie (2), Dickens
5 October 1985	Newcastle United	A	2–1	26,709	McAvennie, Cottee
12 October 1985	Arsenal	H	0–0	24,057	
19 October 1985	Aston Villa	H	4–1	15,034	McAvennie (2), Cottee (2)
26 October 1985	Ipswich Town	A	1–0	16,849	Cottee
2 November 1985	Everton	H	2–1	23,844	McAvennie (2)
9 November 1985	Oxford United	A	2–1	13,140	Cottee, Ward
16 November 1985	Watford	H	2–1	21,490	McAvennie, Ward
23 November 1985	Coventry City	A	1–0	11,042	McAvennie
30 November 1985	West Bromwich Albion	H	4–0	16,325	Cottee, Parris, Devonshire, Orr
7 December 1985	Queens Park Rangers	A	1–0	23,836	McAvennie
14 December 1985	Birmingham City	H	2–0	17,481	McAvennie, Stewart (pen)
21 December 1985	Luton Town	A	0–0	14,599	
26 December 1985	Tottenham Hotspur	A	0–1	33,835	
11 January 1986	Leicester City	A	1–0	11,359	McAvennie
18 January 1986	Liverpool	A	1–3	41,056	Dickens
2 February 1986	Manchester United	H	2–1	22,642	Ward, Cottee
15 March 1986	Arsenal	A	0–1	31,240	
19 March 1986	Aston Villa	A	1–2	11,579	Hunt (o.g.)
22 March 1986	Sheffield Wednesday	H	1–0	16,604	McAvennie
29 March 1986	Chelsea	A	4–0	29,955	Devonshire, Cottee (2), McAvennie
31 March 1986	Tottenham Hotspur	H	2–1	27,497	Cottee, McAvennie
2 April 1986	Nottingham Forest	A	1–2	17,498	Cottee
8 April 1986	Southampton	H	1–0	22,459	Martin
12 April 1986	Oxford United	H	3–1	23,956	Trewick (o.g.), McAvennie, Stewart (pen)
15 April 1986	Chelsea	H	1–2	29,361	Cottee
19 April 1986	Watford	A	2–0	16,651	Cottee, McAvennie
21 April 1986	Newcastle United	H	8–1	24,735	Martin (3; 1 pen), Stewart, Orr, Roeder (o.g.), Goddard, McAvennie
26 April 1986	Coventry City	H	1–0	27,251	Cottee
28 April 1986	Manchester City	H	1–0	27,153	Stewart (pen)
30 April 1986	Ipswich Town	H	2–1	31,131	Dickens, Stewart (pen)
3 May 1986	West Bromwich Albion	A	3–2	17,651	McAvennie, Cottee, Stewart (pen)
5 May 1986	Everton	A	1–3	40,073	Cottee

=== FA Cup ===
Round	Date	Opponent	Venue	Result	Attendance	Goalscorers
R3	5 January 1986	Charlton Athletic	A	1–0	13,037	Cottee
R4	25 January 1986	Ipswich Town	H	0–0	25,035	
R4R	4 February 1986	Ipswich Town	A	1–1aet	25,384	Cottee
R4RR	6 February 1986	Ipswich Town	A	1–0aet	14,515	Cottee
R5	5 March 1986	Manchester United	H	1–1	26,441	McAvennie
R5R	9 March 1986	Manchester United	A	2–0	30,441	Pike, Stewart (pen)
R6	12 March 1986	Sheffield Wednesday	A	1–2	35,522	Cottee

=== League Cup ===
Round	Date	Opponent	Venue	Result	Attendance	Goalscorers
R2 1st leg	24 September 1985	Swansea City	H	3–0	9,282	Cottee, McAvennie, Stewart (pen)
R2 2nd leg	8 October 1985	Swansea City	A	3–2 (won 6–2 on agg)	3,584	Stewart (2 pen), Cottee
R3	29 October 1985	Manchester United	A	0–1	32,057	

== Squad statistics ==
No.		Player	Position	Lge Apps	Lge Gls	FAC Apps	FAC Gls	LC Apps	LC Gls	Total Apps	Total Gls	Date signed	Previous club
West Ham United F.C. 1985–86 First XI (Most appearances)
1	(England)	Phil Parkes	GK	42		7		3		52	-	February 1979	Queens Park Rangers
2	(Scotland)	Ray Stewart	RB	39	6	6	1	3	3	48	10	September 1979	Dundee United
3	(England)	Steve Walford	LB	27		3		3		33	-	August 1983	Norwich
4	(England)	Tony Gale	CB	42		7		3		52	-	August 1983	Fulham
5	(England)	Alvin Martin (Captain)	CB	40	4	7		3		50	4	July 1976	Academy
6	(England)	Alan Devonshire	LM	38	3	6		3		47	3	October 1976	Southall
7	(England)	Mark Ward	RM	42	3	7		3		52	3	August 1985	Oldham Athletic
8	(Scotland)	Frank McAvennie	CF	41	26	7	1	3	1	51	28	June 1985	St Mirren
9	(England)	Alan Dickens	CM	40 (1)	4	7		3		50 (1)	4	1982	Academy
10	(England)	Tony Cottee (Hammer of the Year)	CF	41 (1)	20	7	4	3	2	51 (1)	26	September 1982	Academy
11	(Scotland)	Neil Orr	CM	33 (3)	2	1 (1)		3		37 (4)	2	January 1982	Morton
Players with 10+ appearances
3	(England)	George Parris	LB	23 (3)	1	7		0 (2)		30 (5)	1	1985	Academy
11	(England)	Geoff Pike	CM	10		5	1			15	1	September 1974	Academy
Other players with appearances
8	(England)	Paul Goddard	CF	1 (5)	1	0 (1)				1 (6)	1	August 1980	Queens Park Rangers
5	(England)	Paul Hilton	CB	2						2	-	1984	Bury
10	(England)	Greg Campbell	CF	1 (2)						1 (2)	-	1984	Academy
12	(England)	Bobby Barnes	CF	0 (1)						0 (1)	-	1980	Academy
12	(England)	Steve Potts	RB	0 (1)						0 (1)	-	May 1984	Academy
