= The Boys of 86 =

West Ham United team of the 1985–86 season

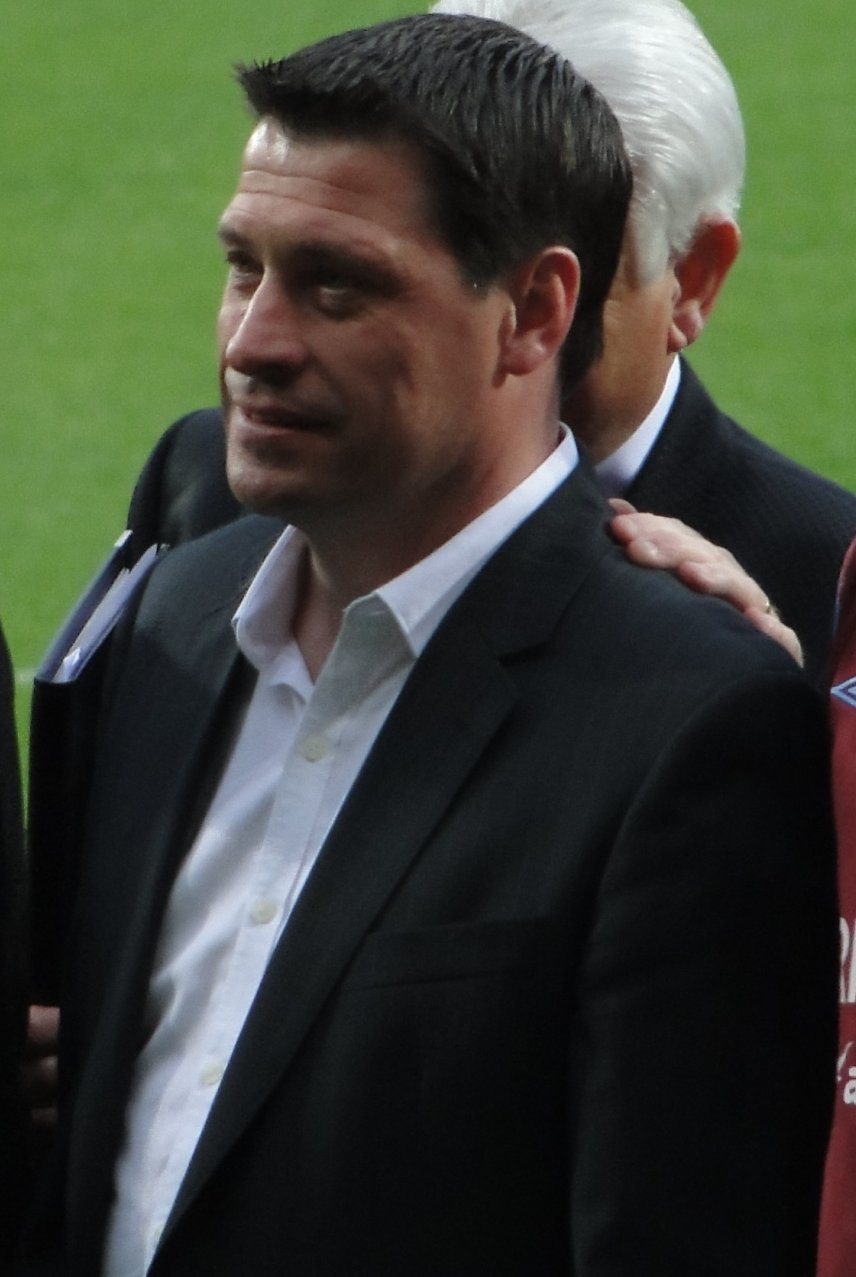
Tony Cottee, scorer of 20 league goals in 1985–86

The Boys of 86 are the West Ham United team of the 1985–86 season.

The West Ham team from this season achieved their highest ever position in the Football League, third in the First Division. They were challenging for the title throughout the season which has been described as West Ham's greatest ever season. With one game remaining they were second in the league eventually finishing third behind champions, Liverpool and Everton. The season is often used as a comparison for more modern West Ham United teams.

== Background ==
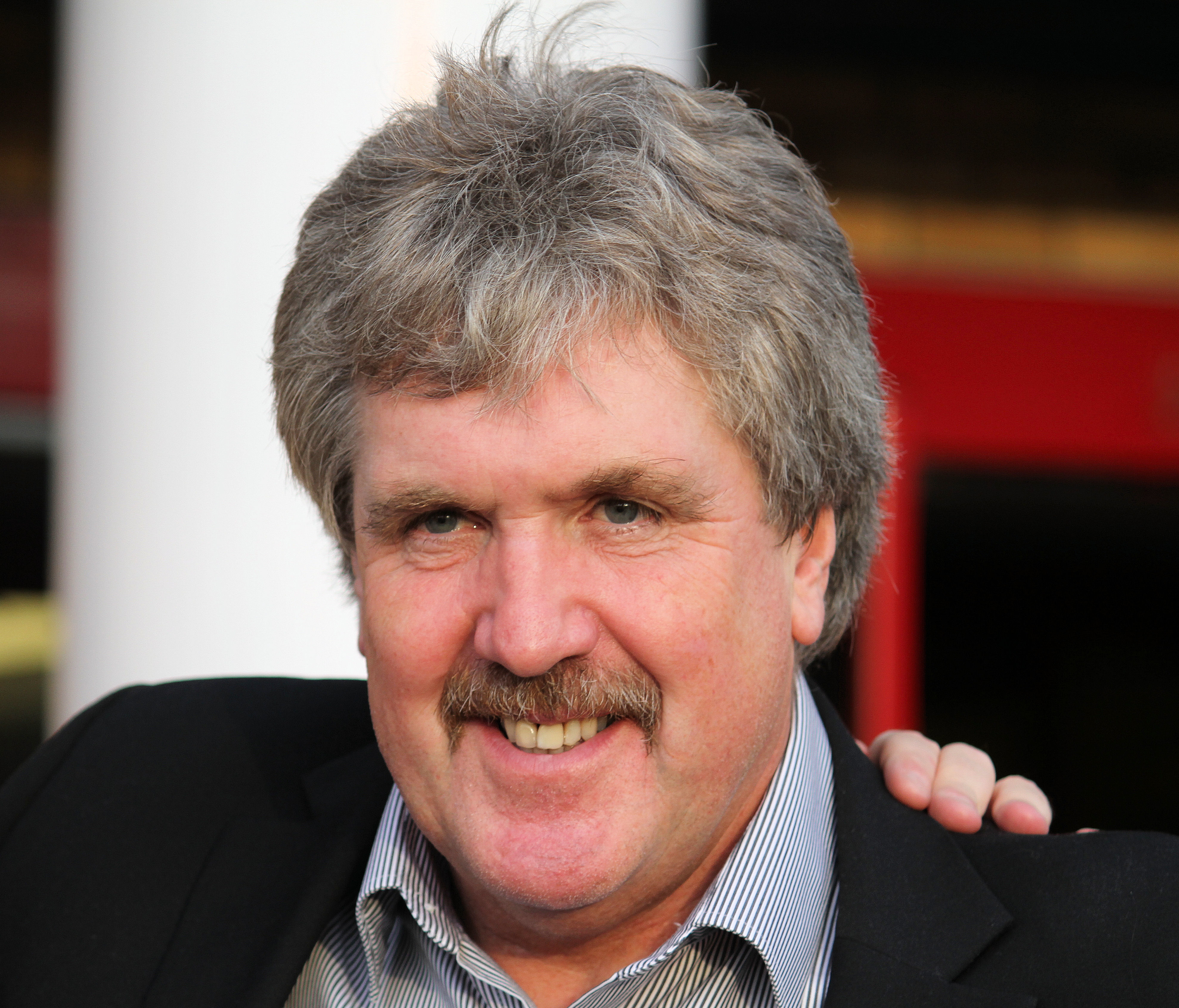
Phil Parkes played in goal for every game of the 1985–86 season.

Managed by John Lyall, West Ham had finished 16th in the previous season but additions of Frank McAvennie and Mark Ward combined with the partnership of McAvennie and Tony Cottee and the captaincy of Alvin Martin made West Ham genuine title challengers.

The season had started badly with one win from the first seven games. By the autumn the club had gone on a record 18 games undefeated including nine successive victories and by Christmas of 1985 they were described by journalist Joe Melling of the Daily Express as the "best team in the land". After three defeats in four games and a period when fixtures were badly affected by weather West Ham were 7th. However a 4–0 away win at Chelsea's Stamford Bridge, an 8–1 win against Newcastle United, in which Alvin Martin scored a hat-trick against three different goalkeepers, and a period when four games were played in one week, had West Ham four points behind Liverpool with a game in hand. The title was eventually won by Liverpool after Kenny Dalglish scored in a 1–0 victory over Chelsea in the last but one game of the season. In a final game of the season an exhausted West Ham team lost to Everton at Goodison Park to take third place.

Team member Tony Gale, who would later go on to win a Premier League title with Blackburn Rovers, said of the season, "I will never forget those days as long as I live. That was a dream team....wonderful to play in and wonderful to watch". McAvennie scored 26 league goals in the season with Cottee contributing 20. Nine players appeared in 38 or more games and only 17 outfield players were used all season, the importance of a "settled side" being given for the team's good performance.

== List of the Boys of 86 ==
- Tony Cottee
- Frank McAvennie
- Tony Gale
- Bobby Barnes
- Alan Dickens
- Neil Orr
- Mark Ward
- Alvin Martin
- George Parris
- Paul Goddard
- Geoff Pike
- Greg Campbell
- Alan Devonshire
- Phil Parkes
- Steve Walford
- Ray Stewart
- Paul Hilton
- Steve Potts

== Charity work ==
Since 1986, members of the team have regrouped to raise funds for charities such as for Great Ormond Street Hospital.

== Book and DVD ==
In 2005 a book, Boys of '86: The Untold Story of West Ham United's Greatest-Ever Season, by Tony McDonald and Danny Francis, was published. In 2011 a DVD was released telling the story of the season.
