= Rosenior =

Rosenior is a surname. Notable people with the surname include:

- Leroy Rosenior (born 1964), English football coach and pundit
- Liam Rosenior (born 1984), English footballer and manager, son of Leroy
