= Paul Ince =

English football player and manager (born 1967)

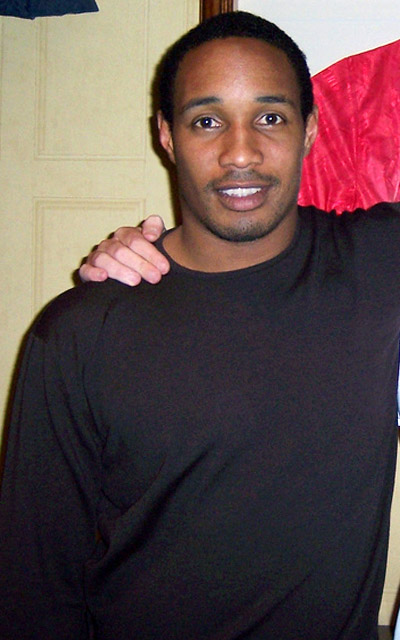
- Ince in 2006

Personal information
- Full name: Paul Emerson Carlyle Ince
- Date of birth: 21 October 1967 (age 59)
- Place of birth: Ilford, London, England
- Height: 1.78 m (5 ft 10 in)
- Position: Midfielder

Youth career
- 1982–1986: West Ham United

Senior career*
Years	Team	Apps	(Gls)
1986–1989	West Ham United	72	(7)
1989–1995	Manchester United	206	(25)
1995–1997	Inter Milan	54	(10)
1997–1999	Liverpool	65	(14)
1999–2002	Middlesbrough	93	(7)
2002–2006	Wolverhampton Wanderers	115	(10)
2006	Swindon Town	3	(0)
2007	Macclesfield Town	1	(0)
Total		609	(73)

International career
1989	England U21	2	(0)
1992	England B	1	(0)
1992–2000	England	53	(2)

Managerial career
- 2006–2007: Macclesfield Town
- 2007–2008: Milton Keynes Dons
- 2008: Blackburn Rovers
- 2009–2010: Milton Keynes Dons
- 2010–2011: Notts County
- 2013–2014: Blackpool
- 2022–2023: Reading
- * Club domestic league appearances and goals

Paul Emerson Carlyle Ince (/ɪns/; born 21 October 1967) is an English professional football manager and former player. A midfielder, Ince played professionally from 1986 to 2007, starting his career with West Ham United and later representing Manchester United, Liverpool, Middlesbrough, Wolverhampton Wanderers, Swindon Town and Macclesfield Town in England, as well as Inter Milan in Italy. With a combined total of 271 league appearances for the two, Ince is one of the few players, especially in the Premier League era, to have represented both of arch rivals Liverpool and Manchester United.

Ince spent the majority of his playing career at the highest level; after breaking through with his boyhood club West Ham United in the Second Division, he joined Manchester United in 1989, where he won the Premier League twice, the FA Cup twice and the Football League Cup once during his six-year spell at Old Trafford. After falling out with manager Alex Ferguson, Ince was sold to Inter Milan of Serie A in 1995, where he was a runner-up in the 1997 UEFA Cup. After two years in Italy, Ince returned to the Premier League with Liverpool, later also representing Middlesbrough and Wolverhampton Wanderers in the top flight.

Ince was capped 53 times by the England national team, scoring two goals. He played at UEFA Euro 1996, the 1998 FIFA World Cup and Euro 2000, and became the first black player to captain England.

After a spell as player-coach of Swindon, he retired from playing while player-manager of Macclesfield Town in 2007. He went on to manage Milton Keynes Dons (twice), Blackburn Rovers, Notts County, Blackpool and Reading. His son Tom is also a footballer.

== Club career ==
=== West Ham United ===
Paul Emerson Carlyle Ince was born in Ilford, Greater London. He grew up as a West Ham United supporter. He was spotted playing, aged 12, by West Ham manager John Lyall around the time that the club was in the Second Division and achieved a surprise FA Cup final triumph over Arsenal.

Ince signed for the Hammers as a trainee, aged 14. Lyall helped Ince through troubled school times eventually signing him as a YTS trainee, on leaving school, in 1984. He is a product of the West Ham youth team and made his debut in English football on 30 November 1986 against Newcastle United in the First Division. He became a regular player in 1987–88, proving himself to have all-round qualities of pace, stamina, uncompromising tackling and good passing ability. He also packed a powerful shot, and was awarded with England under-21 honours to go with the youth caps he acquired as an apprentice. He firmly established himself as the successor in West Ham's midfield for the veteran Billy Bonds, who retired at the end of the 1987–88 season. Unfortunately for Ince, West Ham were not enjoying one of their best spells when he broke into the team. Despite having won the FA Cup in 1980 and finished third in the league in 1986, they had failed to sustain their challenge for major honours and finished 15th in 1987 and 16th in 1988, and worse was to follow.

In August 1988, an eventful season for Ince began. In a struggling West Ham side, he shot to national recognition with two stunning goals in a shock 4–1 win over defending league champions Liverpool in the League Cup, and continued to score goals as the Hammers reached the semi-finals while having real trouble finding any form in the League. West Ham lost to Luton Town in the semi-finals and, despite frequent displays of individual brilliance from Ince, were relegated at the end of the season, which cost manager John Lyall his job after 15 years at the helm.

=== Manchester United ===
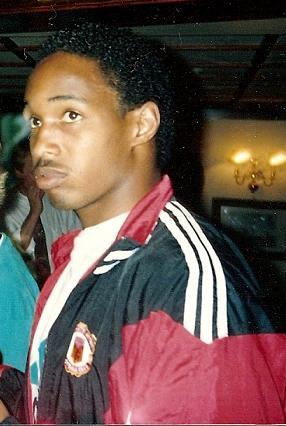
Ince in 1991

Ince played just once in the Second Division the following season before completing a highly controversial transfer to Manchester United for £1 million. Ince had been photographed in a Manchester United kit long before the transfer was complete, which appeared in the Daily Express. Ince received abuse from West Ham United fans for many years afterwards. The initial move was postponed after he failed a medical, but was quickly completed on 14 September 1989 after he later received the all-clear.

In an article in Four Four Two magazine, Ince said:

"I spoke to Alex Ferguson and the deal was close to being done. I then went on holiday, and my agent at the time, Ambrose Mendy, said it wasn't worth me coming back to do a picture in a United shirt when the deal was completed, so I should do one before I left, and it would be released when the deal was announced. Lawrence Luster of the Daily Star took the picture and put in the library. Soon after, their sister paper, the Daily Express, were looking for a picture of me playing for West Ham, and found the one of me in the United shirt in the pile. They published it and all hell broke loose. "I came back from holiday to discover West Ham fans were going mad. It wasn't really my fault. I was only a kid, I did what my agent told me to do, then took all the crap for it."

Ince eventually made his Manchester United debut in a 5–1 win over Millwall, although his next game for United came in a 5–1 Manchester derby defeat by Manchester City. Ince became a strong presence in the United midfield alongside Bryan Robson and Neil Webb, although the first season of this midfield partnership saw Robson and in particular Webb miss many games due to injury.

United won the FA Cup in his first season, defeating Crystal Palace 1–0 in a replay at Wembley after initially drawing 3–3. In both of these games, Ince was selected at right-back in favour of Viv Anderson, with his favoured central midfield position being occupied by Mike Phelan. Ince was man of the match for the replay.

Over the next four seasons, Robson's United career gradually wound down until he finally left to manage Middlesbrough in 1994. During this time, Ince found himself playing alongside several other different central midfielders, including Mike Phelan, Neil Webb and Darren Ferguson. One of his best games came in February 1994, when he scored in a 2–2 away draw with former club West Ham in the Premier League.

Ince won his second winners' medal when Manchester United defeated Barcelona in the final of the European Cup Winners Cup in Rotterdam in 1991, and received his third another year later when United beat Nottingham Forest in the 1992 League Cup final.

Manchester United continued to dominate the domestic game in 1993–94, enjoying an almost unbroken lead of the Premier League throughout the season, and Ince was the midfield general in the side which won the "double" of league and FA Cup in 1994. A year later Manchester United went to West Ham on the last day of the season, needing a win to retain their Premier League crown. They could only draw the game and Blackburn Rovers took the title. Ince's next game saw them lose the FA Cup final to Everton, leaving United without a major trophy for the first time in six seasons.

In June 1995, Ferguson sold Ince to Inter Milan for £7.5 million – at the time one of the biggest fees involving an English club- and a three-year deal of a reputedly £2 million annual salary. Ferguson had long sustained a tempestuous relationship with Ince, labelling him a "bottler" and a "big-time Charlie" (a statement Ferguson said later he regretted). Ince's nickname, The Guvnor, also rankled with Ferguson, who once berated him by saying, "There's only one guvnor around here, Incey, and it ain't you". Many fans saw this as the prime reason for Ince being sold, rather than on footballing or economic grounds.

While at United, Ince won two Premier League title medals as well as two FA Cup winner's medals and one winner's medal each in the European Cup Winners' Cup and Football League Cup. He had also collected runners-up medals in the League Cup twice and the FA Cup once.

=== Inter Milan ===
In the 1995–96 season, Inter failed to challenge for a 14th scudetto, finishing seventh in Serie A. Ince, though, had a successful first season, playing in all but four of Inter's league matches and performing well after a slow start which had started speculation that he could be on his way back to the Premier League as early as the November transfer window - with Arsenal and Newcastle United both reported to be interested. However, he would remain in Milan for two seasons.

The next year, Ince had another successful season with the nerazzurri, scoring 6 times in 24 matches in the championship – in which Inter finished third – and also playing his part in Inter's run through to the UEFA Cup Final. Ince scored in the third round second-leg match away to Boavista as Inter swept all before them before meeting Schalke 04 in the final. Ince was suspended for the away first-leg as Inter lost 1–0 but he returned to the line-up for the home match which the Italians won 1–0 thanks to a goal from Iván Zamorano. Schalke won 4–1 in the resulting penalty shoot-out.

Ince was offered a new, improved contract by club president Massimo Moratti, despite having two and a half years left on his current contract. Due to family reasons he was unable to accept the contract and returned to England with Liverpool.

=== Liverpool ===
In July 1997, Ince returned to England, joining Manchester United's rivals Liverpool. His new club's fans were divided over his links to United. In his first season at Anfield, he equalised in a 1–1 Merseyside Derby draw at home to Everton on 23 February 1998, and on 6 May he scored twice in a 4–0 win over newly crowned league champions Arsenal to secure third place. He equalised in a 2–2 comeback draw against United, who nonetheless won the treble.

According to Graeme Le Saux's autobiography, Ince's homophobic taunting and Le Saux's reaction during a 1997 match between Liverpool and Chelsea resulted in a long-running coolness between the two players. Ince won no honours in his two seasons with Liverpool, and remarked on his teammates "I just felt they were good players, but just wanted to go out all the time, and I just thought that wasn't the way. I thought they needed that professionalism on the pitch"; these players were dubbed the "Spice Boys" by the tabloid media for their off-field issues. He fell out with Liverpool manager Gérard Houllier in the summer of 1999, when he attempted to sign Marc-Vivien Foé without consulting him.

=== Middlesbrough ===
Houllier put Ince on the transfer list and the 31-year-old signed for Middlesbrough for £1 million in July 1999. He was signed by his former Manchester United midfield partner Bryan Robson.

Ince received 11, 9 and 10 yellow cards in his three respective seasons. On 22 October 2001, in a 2–0 home win over rivals Sunderland, he was sent off for putting his hands to Niall Quinn's face. The following 10 March, he scored in a 3–0 victory against Everton at the Riverside Stadium to put Boro into the semifinals of the FA Cup, but he missed the defeat to Arsenal in that round due to suspension.

In July 2002, Ince left Boro after turning down a two-year contract extension, citing the long commute from his home in the northwest. He played 106 games for Boro, scoring nine goals.

=== Wolverhampton Wanderers ===
In August 2002, Ince signed a one-year contract with Football League First Division side Wolverhampton Wanderers, who had just signed his former Manchester United teammate Denis Irwin. In his first season outside top-flight football, he helped the team to promotion via a 3–0 win over Sheffield United in the play-off final, assisting the second goal by Nathan Blake.

Ince and Irwin signed new one-year contracts to remain with Wolves for the 2003–04 FA Premier League season. The team finished bottom and he was sent off in the last game of the season, a 2–0 loss to Tottenham at Molineux.

With over 100 appearances to his name, Ince signed a new contract in June 2005. Through thigh problems, he missed four months between August and December.

In April 2006, Ince announced that he wanted to continue playing for Wolves for a further season after speaking with his friend Teddy Sheringham. However, following Ince's failure to get the manager's job at Wolves in July 2006 on Hoddle's resignation, the newly appointed manager, Mick McCarthy, decided not to offer Ince a new contract. Throughout his time with the club, Ince declared his intention to return, at some point in the future, as manager of Wolves.

== International career ==
Ince made his debut for the full England team on 9 September 1992 in a friendly match against Spain in Santander, losing 1–0. Ince made history during the tour of the US when, on his seventh cap against the host nation on 6 June 1993, he became England's first black captain in the absence of David Platt and Tony Adams. England lost 2–0.

Ince's only international goals came on his 12th appearance. These were two in a 7–1 win away to San Marino in the final game of the unsuccessful 1994 FIFA World Cup qualification, on 17 November 1993. During Euro 96 Ince was a member of Terry Venables' England team as the midfield ball winner and got the label of "Gazza's minder", whose job was to create room for Paul Gascoigne to exploit with his natural ball skills. Though the first group game ended in a disappointing 1–1 draw at Wembley against Switzerland, England went on to defeat Scotland 2–0 and then met the Netherlands and put on a display subsequently heralded as "the greatest in generations" and "the high point of the tournament for England". Ince was fouled for a penalty which gave England the lead and helped them towards a 4–1 win; he also picked up a yellow card which rendered him unavailable for the quarter-final against Spain, so David Platt replaced him in a match England won in a penalty shoot-out.

Venables put Ince back in the side for the semifinal against Germany, replacing the suspended Gary Neville as England switched systems to a back three, accommodating Ince in central midfield with Paul Gascoigne and David Platt. Ince was part of an England team that played well but the match rarely spent much time as one-way traffic in either direction, and it finished a 1–1 draw. England lost the penalty shoot-out when Gareth Southgate missed the sixth England penalty. Ince, along with fellow midfielders Steve McManaman and Darren Anderton and captain Tony Adams, received criticism for not taking a penalty before Southgate, and Ince also sat with his back to the action for the whole time.

Ince, in an incident reminiscent of Terry Butcher seven years earlier, started a crucial 1998 FIFA World Cup qualifier away to the Italy on 11 October 1997 with a white England shirt and ended it with a red one after his own blood soaked the shirt following a deep cut to his head. The game ended goalless and England had qualified. He was selected in the England squad for the finals in France. England got through the group but succumbed in the second round to Argentina, again after a penalty shoot-out. This time Ince did take a penalty but saw it saved.

Ince was sent off in a 2–1 loss against Sweden in England's first qualifying match for Euro 2000 on 5 September 1998. In his absence, manager Kevin Keegan chose David Batty in central midfield. When Batty himself was sent off against Poland, Ince returned for the playoff against Scotland.

In a warm up match for Euro 2000 against Malta, Ince came on as a substitute and won his 50th cap, and was subsequently named in the 22-man squad for the tournament. He duly played in all three of England's group games of the tournament – winning a penalty against Romania in the last game – but England lost two of three matches and were eliminated. He publicly said that he would not follow Alan Shearer into international retirement, given that he did not want to end his England career on a low note.

== Style of play ==
A tenacious, athletic, and hard-working player, Ince was known for his tireless running and ability to provide defensive support to his team in midfield.

== Managerial career ==
=== Swindon Town (player-coach) ===
Ince signed a one-year contract with Swindon Town as a player/coach on 31 August 2006. Swindon beat the likes of Birmingham City and West Bromwich Albion for his signature. A key factor in the transfer was Ince's long standing friendship with Town manager Dennis Wise, who had played alongside him in the England team during the 1990s. He made his first start for Swindon in his second game, the 2–1 victory over MK Dons on 12 September, winning a penalty. Having played one more game, he ended his contract by mutual consent on 6 October, citing long travel times from his home in Chester. He said he would remain for his coaching badges.

=== Macclesfield Town ===
On 23 October 2006, Ince was confirmed as the new player-manager of Macclesfield Town in succession to Brian Horton. However, he was ineligible to play for the Silkmen until January when the transfer window opened, as Swindon Town still held his registration. He joined Macclesfield with the club bottom of League Two, seven points off their nearest rivals. He then revived confidence and after a 3–0 win against Chester they managed to climb off the bottom of the table. They subsequently avoided relegation, albeit on the last day of the season. On 4 January 2007 Ince was named as League Two Manager of the Month for December. Ince retired as a player while at Macclesfield, where he only made one league appearance, as an 85th-minute substitute for Alan Navarro in a 1–1 home draw with Notts County on 5 May that saved the team from relegation.

=== Milton Keynes Dons ===
Ince was unveiled as the new Milton Keynes Dons manager along with his assistant Ray Mathias and fitness coach Duncan Russell on 25 June 2007. The Dons reached the top of their Division in September 2007 and other clubs began to take a serious interest. In October and November 2007, he denied rumours that he was being linked with managerless Premier League teams Wigan Athletic, Derby County and Championship team Norwich City.

Ince was named as League Two Manager of the Month in October and December 2007, and again in April 2008.

Ince's first silverware as manager came in the Football League Trophy final at Wembley on 30 March 2008, with MK Dons defeating Grimsby Town 2–0. He then secured the Dons' return to League One on 19 April after they beat Stockport County 3–2. A week later, the Dons became League Two champions after they beat Bradford City 2–1.

=== Blackburn Rovers ===
In the close-season it was speculated that Ince had been contacted by Blackburn Rovers in their search to appoint a new manager, something that Ince himself denied. However, the BBC reported that Ince would be named as Blackburn manager by the end of the week of 19 June. He was appointed on 22 June and became the first black British manager in England's top division. On the first day of the 2008–09 FA Premier League season, Blackburn won 3–2 against Everton at Goodison Park on 16 August. Ince's 2008 summer signings included England international goalkeeper Paul Robinson, Danny Simpson (Loan), Vince Grella, Carlos Villanueva (Loan), Robbie Fowler, Mark Bunn and Keith Andrews, spending over £10 million on Robinson, Grella and Andrews.

After winning just three games in 17, Ince was sacked on 16 December 2008 after just six months in charge. He had been with Blackburn only 177 days, one of the shortest reigns of a Premier League manager. Blackburn fans had been demanding his removal following a 5–3 loss to Manchester United at Old Trafford in the League Cup on 3 December. At the game, the crowd could be heard chanting "You don't know what you're doing" and "We want Incey out" as well as singing the name of their former manager Graeme Souness.

=== Return to Milton Keynes Dons ===
On 3 July 2009, Ince signed again for Milton Keynes Dons on a two-year deal. During Ince's second spell the Dons were less successful, finishing in 13th place in League One. On 16 April 2010, he announced that he would leave the job a year early, at the end of the 2009–10 season.

=== Notts County ===
Ince returned to management on 28 October 2010, signing a three-year deal with Notts County. On 3 April 2011 he left the club by mutual consent after a run of five successive defeats left them in 19th, two points above the relegation zone.

=== Blackpool ===
On 18 February 2013, Blackpool appointed Ince as manager on a one-year rolling contract. He had been watching the team, for which his son Tom played, in person for over a year. Ince took charge of his first match as Blackpool manager on 20 February 2013, a 2–0 defeat against Leeds United at Elland Road. He earned his first win on 9 March 2013, a 2–1 victory against Watford at Vicarage Road.

Under Ince, Blackpool made their best-ever start to a league season. Their victory at AFC Bournemouth on 14 September 2013 gave them 16 points out of a possible 18, with five wins and a draw in their first six games. Following the game at Bournemouth, Ince was given a five-match stadium ban by The Football Association for his conduct towards a match official in the tunnel after the game. The FA concluded that his behaviour had constituted violent conduct. He was also fined £4,000. Ince left Blackpool on 21 January 2014, after less than a year in charge, becoming their fourth-shortest-serving manager in their history (40 league games). Under his management, Blackpool won 12 out of 42 games and had not won since 30 November 2013.

=== Reading ===
On 19 February 2022, Ince and Michael Gilkes were announced as interim managers of Championship side Reading. On his debut three days later, the team won 2–1 at home to Birmingham City. Despite losing 3–0 to Hull City on 23 April, Ince guided Reading to safety with two games left to play, ensuring Championship football for the club in the 2022–23 season. In May 2022, Ince was given the manager's job on a permanent basis along with assistant Alex Rae who was also given a permanent role.

On 11 April 2023, Ince was sacked by Reading. At the time Reading were in 22nd in the Championship and had not won in their previous eight games.

== Personal life ==
Ince married Claire in 1990. They have two sons and a daughter. His eldest son, Tom, has played for the England national under-17 football team and for Ince's former club Liverpool. On 1 November 2010, Ince put through a two-month loan deal to bring Tom to Notts County and on 3 August 2011 Tom signed a two-year contract with Blackpool. The two were reunited in February 2022 when Ince became interim manager of Reading.

Ince is the uncle of singer Rochelle Humes and cousin to footballer Rohan Ince and Trinidadian goalkeeper Clayton Ince.

In June 2025, Ince was charged with drink driving after his Range Rover crashed into the central reservation in Neston, Wirral. In July 2025, Ince received a 12 month driving ban, was fined £5,000 and ordered to pay a £2,000 statutory surcharge and £85 costs.

== Career statistics ==
=== Club ===
Appearances and goals by club, season and competition
Club	Season	League			National cup (Note: Includes FA Cup, Coppa Italia)		League cup (Note: Includes Football League Cup)		Europe		Other		Total	
Club	Season	Division	Apps	Goals	Apps	Goals	Apps	Goals	Apps	Goals	Apps	Goals	Apps	Goals
West Ham United	1986–87	First Division	10	1	2	0	0	0	—		1 (Note: Appearance(s) in Full Members' Cup)	0	13	1
West Ham United	1987–88	First Division	28	3	1	0	2	0	—		1	0	32	3
West Ham United	1988–89	First Division	33	3	7	1	7	3	—		2	1	49	8
West Ham United	1989–90	Second Division	1	0	—		—		—		—		1	0
West Ham United	Total		72	7	10	1	9	3	—		4	1	95	12
Manchester United	1989–90	First Division	26	0	7	0	3	2	—		—		36	2
Manchester United	1990–91	First Division	31	3	2	0	6	0	7 (Note: Appearances in European Cup Winners' Cup)	0	1 (Note: Appearance in FA Charity Shield)	0	47	3
Manchester United	1991–92	First Division	33	3	3	0	7	0	3	0	1 (Note: Appearances in European Super Cup)	0	47	3
Manchester United	1992–93	Premier League	41	5	2	0	3	0	1 (Note: Appearances in UEFA Cup)	0	—		47	5
Manchester United	1993–94	Premier League	39	8	7	1	5	0	4 (Note: Appearances in UEFA Champions League)	0	1	0	56	9
Manchester United	1994–95	Premier League	36	5	6	0	0	0	5	0	1	1	48	6
Manchester United	Total		206	24	27	1	24	2	20	0	4	1	281	28
Inter Milan	1995–96	Serie A	30	3	5	0	—		0	0	—		35	3
Inter Milan	1996–97	Serie A	24	7	4	2	—		10	1	—		38	10
Inter Milan	Total		54	10	9	2	—		10	1	—		73	13
Liverpool	1997–98	Premier League	31	8	1	0	4	0	4	0	—		40	8
Liverpool	1998–99	Premier League	34	6	2	1	2	1	3	1	—		41	9
Liverpool	Total		65	14	3	1	6	1	7	1	—		81	17
Middlesbrough	1999–2000	Premier League	32	3	0	0	3	1	—		—		35	4
Middlesbrough	2000–01	Premier League	30	2	3	0	2	0	—		—		35	2
Middlesbrough	2001–02	Premier League	31	2	4	1	1	0	—		—		36	3
Middlesbrough	Total		93	7	7	1	6	1	—		—		106	9
Wolverhampton Wanderers	2002–03	First Division	37	2	3	1	2	0	—		3 (Note: Appearances in First Division play-offs)	0	45	3
Wolverhampton Wanderers	2003–04	Premier League	32	2	1	0	2	0	—		—		35	2
Wolverhampton Wanderers	2004–05	Championship	28	3	2	0	1	1	—		—		31	4
Wolverhampton Wanderers	2005–06	Championship	18	3	2	0	0	0	—		—		20	3
Wolverhampton Wanderers	Total		115	10	8	1	5	1	—		3	0	131	12
Swindon Town	2006–07	League Two	3	0	0	0	0	0	—		0	0	3	0
Macclesfield Town	2006–07	League Two	1	0	—		—		—		—		1	0
Total			609	72	64	7	50	8	37	2	11	2	771	91

=== International ===
Appearances and goals by national team and year
National team	Year	Apps	Goals
England	1992	3	0
England	1993	9	2
England	1994	3	0
England	1995	1	0
England	1996	10	0
England	1997	9	0
England	1998	9	0
England	1999	4	0
England	2000	5	0
Total		53	2

Scores and results list England's goal tally first, score column indicates score after each Ince goal.

List of international goals scored by Paul Ince
No.	Date	Venue	Opponent	Score	Result	Competition
1	17 November 1993	Stadio Renato Dall'Ara, Bologna, Italy	San Marino	1–1	7–1	1994 FIFA World Cup qualification
2	17 November 1993	Stadio Renato Dall'Ara, Bologna, Italy	San Marino	5–1	7–1	1994 FIFA World Cup qualification

== Managerial statistics ==
As of match played 10 April 2023

Managerial record by team and tenure
Team	From	To	Record				
Team	From	To	P	W	D	L	Win %
Macclesfield Town	23 October 2006	25 June 2007	35	14	8	13	40.0
MK Dons	25 June 2007	21 June 2008	55	33	12	10	60.0
Blackburn Rovers	21 June 2008	16 December 2008	21	6	4	11	28.6
MK Dons	6 July 2009	8 May 2010	56	23	9	24	41.1
Notts County	27 October 2010	3 April 2011	29	10	6	13	34.5
Blackpool	18 February 2013	21 January 2014	42	12	15	15	28.6
Reading	20 February 2022	11 April 2023	58	18	11	29	31.0
Total			296	116	65	115	39.2

== Honours ==
=== As a player ===
Manchester United

- Premier League: 1992–93, 1993–94
- FA Cup: 1989–90, 1993–94; runner-up: 1994–95
- Football League Cup: 1991–92; runner-up: 1990–91, 1993–94
- FA Charity Shield: 1990 (shared), 1993, 1994
- European Cup Winners' Cup: 1990–91
- European Super Cup: 1991

Inter Milan

- UEFA Cup runner-up: 1996–97

Wolverhampton Wanderers

- Football League First Division play-offs: 2003

England

- Tournoi de France: 1997

Individual

- West Ham United Hammer of the Year: 1988–89
- Sir Matt Busby Player of the Year: 1992–93
- Premier League Player of the Month: October 1994
- PFA Team of the Year: 1992–93 Premier League, 1993–94 Premier League, 1994–95 Premier League
- Domestic Team of the Decade – Premier League 10 Seasons Awards (1992–93 to 2001–02)

=== As a manager ===
Milton Keynes Dons

- Football League Two: 2007–08
- Football League Trophy: 2007–08

Individual

- Football League Two Manager of the Month: December 2006, October 2007, December 2007, April 2008
- Football League Championship Manager of the Month: August 2013
