= Paul Kelly (footballer, born 1969) =

English footballer

Personal information
- Full name: Paul Michael Kelly
- Date of birth: 12 October 1969 (age 57)
- Place of birth: Bexley, England
- Positions: Right-back; defensive midfielder

Youth career
- West Ham United
- 1984–1986: FA School of Excellence
- 1986–1990: West Ham United

Senior career*
Years	Team	Apps	(Gls)
1990–1991	West Ham United	1	(0)

International career
1985–1986	England U16	8	(2)
	England Youth	11	
- * Club domestic league appearances and goals

Paul Michael Kelly (born 12 October 1969) is an English former footballer who played as a right-back or defensive midfielder for West Ham United. He made a single appearance in the Football League.

Kelly played schoolboy football for England and spent two years at the FA School of Excellence at Lilleshall between 1984 and 1986. He made 11 appearances for England Youth.

After rejoining West Ham United as an apprentice, Kelly became a reserve team regular. He made a single Second Division appearance for West Ham, coming on as a second-half substitute for Steve Potts in a 1–2 defeat against Hull City on 20 January 1990. On 19 December, he made his only other first-team appearance, playing the full match against Luton Town in the second round of the 1990–91 Full Members' Cup, a match that ended in a 5–1 defeat.

He was released in May 1991 and was picked up by Gillingham, where he played in a pre-season friendly against his old club, but thereafter gave up football.

== Career statistics ==
Club	Season	League			FA Cup		League Cup		Other		Total	
Club	Season	Division	Apps	Goals	Apps	Goals	Apps	Goals	Apps	Goals	Apps	Goals
West Ham United	1989–90	Second Division	1	0	0	0	0	0	0	0	1	0
West Ham United	1990–91	Second Division	0	0	0	0	0	0	1 (Note: Appearance in Full Members' Cup)	0	1	0
Career total			1	0	0	0	0	0	1	0	2	0
