= Alan Dickens (footballer) =

English footballer (born 1964)

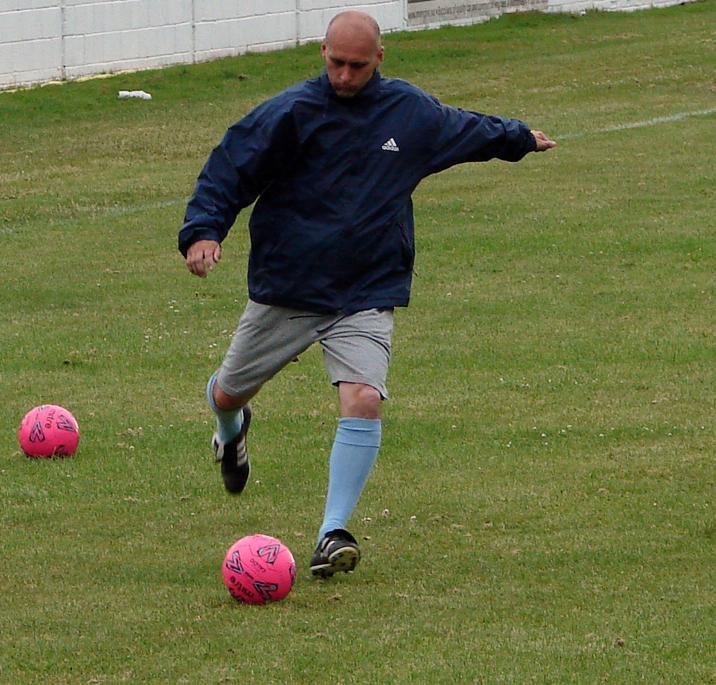
- Dickens at Barking during the 2009–10 season

Personal information
- Full name: Alan William Dickens
- Date of birth: 3 September 1964 (age 62)
- Place of birth: Plaistow, England
- Height: 5 ft 11 in (1.80 m)
- Position: Midfielder

Youth career
- 1979–1982: West Ham United

Senior career*
Years	Team	Apps	(Gls)
1982–1989	West Ham United	192	(23)
1989–1993	Chelsea	48	(1)
1992	→ West Bromwich Albion (loan)	3	(1)
1993	→ Brentford (loan)	15	(1)
1993–1994	Colchester United	32	(3)
1994–1995	Chesham United		
1995	Hayes	4	(0)
1995–1996	Collier Row		
1996–1997	Billericay Town		
1997–1998	Purfleet		

International career
1982–1983	England Youth	4	(0)
1984	England U21	1	(0)

Managerial career
- 2012: Barking
- * Club domestic league appearances and goals

Alan William Dickens (born 3 September 1964) is an English former professional footballer who played in the Football League as a midfielder. He played the majority of his football at West Ham United and Chelsea, and later played non-league football. He had a short spell as manager of Barking. He is now assistant manager of the Barking FC under 23s.

== Career ==
Dickens was born in Plaistow, Essex, and started training with West Ham United at under-11 level. He played for Newham, captaining the side, and Essex as a teenager. As well as training with West Ham, he spent Christmas and summer holidays training with Manchester United, then managed by former Hammer Dave Sexton. He decided to sign as a schoolboy for West Ham at the age of 15, and won the FA Youth Cup with his local club in 1981. He gained four caps for England Youth, and later played for the England under-21 team, against Finland on 16 October 1984.

He signed for the Hammers as an apprentice on 14 July 1981 and as a professional on 2 August 1982. He scored on his debut, a 2–1 win at Notts County on 18 December 1982, and managed 6 goals in 15 games in his debut season. He ended the season wearing the number 10 shirt usually taken by Trevor Brooking and was thought of by many as the natural successor to Brooking.

He played a key role in the 'Boys of 86' team that finished third in the First Division in the 1985–86 season. An injury to Paul Goddard in the first match of the season saw Dickens promoted from substitute, after which he missed just one match of the campaign. Although a central midfielder, Dicko had to play much of the 1987–88 season partnering Tony Cottee as a striker following the departure of Frank McAvennie in September 1986. Some relief was to come in March 1988, however, with the signing of Leroy Rosenior. He made a total of 231 league and cup appearances for the Hammers, scoring 29 goals, playing his last game for the club on 23 May 1989 against Liverpool.

West Ham were relegated to the Second Division at the end of the 1988–89 season and, after nearly 15 years with West Ham, Dickens made the move to newly-promoted Chelsea for £635,000, a fee set by a Football League tribunal that included his former manager John Lyall. He made 22 league appearances for the West London club during the 1989–90 season under Bobby Campbell, with his debut coming in a 1–0 away win against Wimbledon on 19 August 1989, the opening day of the season. He was regularly substituted during the first half of the campaign. He scored his first league goal in a 4–2 defeat at QPR on 9 December 1989, but made just one appearance between January and the end of the season (as a late replacement for Peter Nicholas in the last game of the season away to Millwall).

During his second season at Chelsea, Dickens failed to make a league start until mid-February. He did, however, keep his place in the side for the remainder of that campaign. Campbell's replacement at the end of the 1990–91 season, Ian Porterfield, signed Vinnie Jones and Dickens added just three games to his 1991–92 tally after Jones arrived early in the season. He played his last first-team game in February 1992, a 1–1 draw at Nottingham Forest, after which he appeared only for the reserve team.

After periods on loan to West Bromwich Albion and Brentford during the 1992–93 season, Dickens moved to Colchester United, signing on 4 September 1993, where he made 32 league appearances and scored 3 goals. He played his final game for the U's, aged 29, on 16 April 1994.

He later played non-league football with Chesham United, Hayes, Collier Row, Billericay Town and Purfleet.

After retirement from football, Dickens continued to live in Barking and went on to work as a black cab driver. He took his preliminary coaching badge through the Essex FA and started coaching the under-10 team that his son played in. He was assistant manager at Barking from November 2008 until April 2012, when he was appointed manager. He left the job in October of that year.

== Honours ==
West Ham United

- FA Youth Cup: 1980–81
