= Julian Dicks =

English footballer & manager (born 1968)

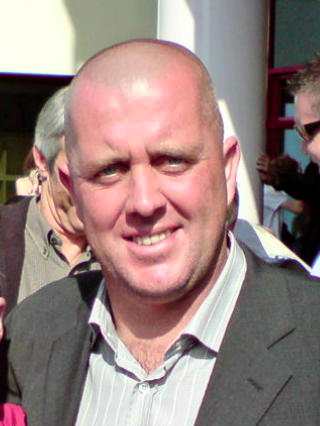
- Dicks at Upton Park in 2008

Personal information
- Full name: Julian Andrew Dicks
- Date of birth: 8 August 1968 (age 58)
- Place of birth: Bristol, England
- Height: 5 ft 10 in (1.78 m)
- Position: Left back

Team information
- Current team: Chelmsford City (coach)

Youth career
- 1982–1985: Birmingham City

Senior career*
Years	Team	Apps	(Gls)
1985–1988	Birmingham City	89	(1)
1988–1993	West Ham United	159	(29)
1993–1994	Liverpool	24	(3)
1994–1999	West Ham United	103	(21)
2001–2002	Canvey Island	4	(1)
Total		379	(55)

International career
1988	England U21	4	(0)
1992	England B	2	(0)

Managerial career
- 2009: Wivenhoe Town
- 2009–2011: Grays Athletic
- 2013: Sealand
- 2014–2015: West Ham United Ladies
- 2018–2019: Heybridge Swifts
- 2021: Heybridge Swifts
- 2024–2025: Heybridge Swifts
- * Club domestic league appearances and goals

Julian Andrew Dicks (born 8 August 1968) is an English football manager and former player who is currently a coach at National League South club Chelmsford City.

Playing from 1985 until 2002, he was a left back, notably in the Premier League for West Ham United and Liverpool. He was voted West Ham's player of the year four times between 1990 and 1997. He also played in the Football League for Birmingham City where he started his footballing career, ending it in 2002 in non-league football with Canvey Island. He became manager of Wivenhoe Town in 2009, before moving to Grays Athletic later that year. He was capped by both the England U21 and England B sides.

Dicks had a reputation for aggressive behaviour and being one of the hardest players in history, which brought him to the attention of referees, the press and footballing authorities. He adopted the nickname of "The Terminator". He was a tough tackler, and due to his strong shot was in regular demand as a penalty and free-kick taker.

== Early life ==
Dicks was born in Keynsham Hospital, Bristol to mother, Carol and father Ron who worked as a fork-lift truck driver for Courage Brewery. Ron played non-league football with Keynsham Town, Welton Rovers, Frome Town and Shepton Mallet whom he would also go on to manage. Dicks attended Novers Lane Primary School, in Knowle, Bristol and Merrywood Boys Secondary School also in Knowle. At age 11 he was watched by former Tottenham Hotspur manager, Bill Nicholson who was scouting for West Ham United, but was turned down as he "was not quick enough". At age 13 he was spotted playing by Ron Veal who was scouting for Aston Villa. Veal recommended him to Villa manager, Ron Saunders, however Saunders lost his job at Villa on 9 February 1982. When he was appointed as manager of Birmingham City nine days later, Veal also changed his employer. Saunders was impressed when he watched Dicks play and he was offered a footballing apprenticeship with Birmingham City in 1982 when Dicks turned 14.

== Club career ==
=== Birmingham City ===
He started his footballing career at Birmingham City, aged 14, having moved from his home in Bristol. Playing as an apprentice he worked his way through the youth and reserve set-ups before making his debut in 1985 in a 2–0 away defeat to Chelsea. In 1988, he was signed by manager John Lyall for West Ham United, for £300,000, giving him the chance of First Division football that Birmingham's relegation in 1986 had denied him. Although Dicks had been booked 33 times and sent-off once in all competitions, in his four seasons with Birmingham City, Lyall identified potential in the player enthusing "There was a great touch there. I wouldn't have signed just a physical player".

=== West Ham United ===
Dicks made his debut for West Ham on 2 April 1988 in a Division One game against Sheffield Wednesday. West Ham lost the game 2–1. He would go on to make eight appearances in the 1987-88 season, his first season with West Ham. The following season, he became a regular player and first choice left back for The Hammers, starting the first game of the season, a 4–0 away defeat to Southampton and playing 34 of a possible 38 games that season. The season also saw his first goal for the club in a 2–1 defeat at Highbury to Arsenal. It was a poor season for West Ham who were relegated to Division Two having finished one place off the bottom of the league in 19th place with 38 points. Relegation had seen the sacking of manager John Lyall and the appointment of Scot, Lou Macari. The new manager and Dicks exhibited a poor working relationship from the outset. Despite this, and with West Ham now playing second-tier football, Dicks retained his left back position and became their regular penalty taker following the exit of former first choice taker, Ray Stewart. Dicks became well known for his penalties. During his West Ham career he scored 35, missing four. His first penalty success came on 23 September 1989 proving to be the only goal in a win against Watford. A future regular captain of the West Ham side, this season also saw his first captaincy, in a League Cup game on 19 September 1989 against his former club, Birmingham City, with manager Macari telling him "I'm making you captain today and I'm making you penalty taker too". Dicks was often cautioned and sent off by referees. His first red-card was in a match versus Wimbledon in the Football League Cup in the 1989–90 season. It was an infamous encounter which included an on-pitch brawl between the opposing players. The fighting was sparked by a two-footed tackle by Wimbledon player, Dennis Wise on Dicks. Six players were booked with the game being described as "a disgrace to football" by journalist, Brian Woolnough. West Ham finished 7th in a season which saw the departure of Lou Macari and the appointment of former player, Billy Bonds as manager. Dicks and Bonds both had reputations as "hard men" and quarrelled frequently.

==== Injury ====
The 1990-91 season saw the start of Dicks' injury problems. On 13 October 1990, playing in a game against Bristol City at Ashton Gate, Dicks hit a dip on the edge of the pitch, his foot going over the edge resulting in a loss of feeling in his left leg. He continued to play but after the game he could barely walk. Against the medical assessment of John Green, who was soon to take over as club physiotherapist, he was told to "crash-on" and in the words of manager Bonds "if the knee goes, it goes". Green believed Dicks was in need of an operation on his knee cartilage. He was picked to play in the next game, against Swindon Town but lasted only 38 minutes. He played again in the next game on 24 October 1990, against Blackburn Rovers but again had to be substituted. A knee operation followed and he would not play again until 21 December 1991 by which time West Ham had been promoted back to the First Division.

==== Another relegation and promotion ====
He played in the second half of the 1991–92 season. Despite his presence, the team finished bottom of the First Division and missed out on the first season of the Premier League. The 1992–93 season was an eventful one for Dicks, mainly for the wrong reasons. He was sent off three times and picked up a string of bookings which saw him miss significant periods of the season and he was subsequently stripped of the captaincy by manager Bonds. His first dismissal came after he threw his elbow into the face of Newcastle United player Franz Carr. There had been no friction between the two players with Dicks saying of the incident "Not to this day do I know why I did it. I had it in my mind that I was going to elbow him, and that was it — bang!". Only four games passed before he was dismissed again. In a game against Wolverhampton Wanderers, Dicks clashed with Paul Birch and Steve Bull before being sent-off, with Billy Bonds having to stop him attacking Birch who was still on the ground. Barely three months passed before his third dismissal of the season. In January 1993 after two bad fouls on Derby County midfielder Ted McMinn he was sent-off, having to be escorted from the pitch by teammate Clive Allen. Despite his disciplinary problems he earned a Division One runners-up medal as West Ham reached the Premier League. Despite his dismissals he played 34 league games of a possible 46 in the promotion season, scoring eleven goals, placing third in the list of highest goal scorers for that season behind only Clive Allen and Trevor Morley.

=== Liverpool ===
Now playing in the Premier League for the first time, West Ham struggled in their first seven games. New signing Simon Webster had a long-term injury having had his leg broken by Dicks in a training session accident. Fellow new signee Dale Gordon had failed to make the impression on the side his transfer had intended. In a move engineered by West Ham's then-Assistant Manager Harry Redknapp, Dicks was transferred in order to bring in new players. Liverpool manager Graeme Souness, on the recommendation of Redknapp, watched Dicks play in a West Ham match against Swindon Town on 11 September 1993. Souness thought Dicks to be "my kind of player" and signed him for Liverpool that week in a swap deal which involved David Burrows and Mike Marsh moving to West Ham. Extra money received by West Ham from the transfer was used by Redknapp to buy veteran striker, Lee Chapman. Dicks' signing had been part of an effort by Souness to "toughen up" the Liverpool team as he had planned to pair him with fellow hard man, Neil Ruddock.

Dicks' debut on 18 September came in a high-profile game against local rivals, Everton at Goodison Park. In an eventful game, Liverpool lost 2–0. Former West Ham players, Mark Ward and Tony Cottee scored with Dicks' mistake on the ball allowing Cottee to control it and score. The game was also memorable for the on-pitch fighting of Liverpool teammates Steve McManaman and Bruce Grobbelaar. By now a regular in the Liverpool side, Dicks scored his opening goal, a shot from 25 yards, in a 3–0 away win against Oldham Athletic in January 1994. His discipline had also improved and he had yet to be booked whilst in Liverpool colours. Unfortunately for Dicks, Souness was proving to be an unpopular manager. He had dropped fan-favourites Ian Rush and John Barnes to the reserve team due to perceived under performance and he had tried to integrate too many young and inexperienced players for many fans' liking. In February 1994 after a shock FA Cup loss to Bristol City, a game in which Dicks did not play, the fans were calling for him to resign. Souness left Liverpool after three years in charge, in February 1994. He was replaced by Roy Evans who had always disliked Dicks and his style of play. Working under Souness he had kept his opinions to himself. Now with Evans as Liverpool manager Dicks found himself out of favour. Dicks and Evans and his assistants Ronnie Moran and Steve Heighway, disagreed over training methods, Dicks' fitness (they considered him to be overweight) and diet. Evans banished him to play with the reserve and to train with 15- and 16-year-olds. He played for Liverpool on 7 May 1994 in a 2–1 away defeat to Aston Villa. It proved to be his last first-team game for the club.

The pre-season of the 1994-95 season started badly for Liverpool and for Dicks. Picked to play in a friendly game against Bolton Wanderers at Burnden Park on 26 July 1994, Liverpool lost 4–1. Evans was again critical of Dicks' performance in the defeat; tired of such criticism he asked for a move from the club. He had played 28 games for Liverpool in all competitions, scoring three goals, although Dicks has the honour of being the last Liverpool player to score in front of the standing Spion Kop at Anfield in a 1–0 win against Ipswich Town near the end of the 1993–94 season. His Liverpool career lasted only 13 months, a short time considering his former manager Souness had said of Dicks, "if I was to pick the best 11 players I've ever worked with, he'd be one of them".

=== Return to West Ham ===
On re-signing Dicks, manager Harry Redknapp commented that he believed that his chairman thought he "was off his rocker" because Dicks was considerably heavier than when he had departed for Liverpool a year earlier. His first game in his second spell for the Hammers, on 22 October 1994, saw a 2–0 home win against Southampton and, in keeping with his reputation, Dicks was booked. Dicks played a major part in helping to keep West Ham in the Premier League in 1994–95 scoring five goals. The 1995–96 saw him equal highest goalscorer, with Tony Cottee, for West Ham in the Premier with ten league goals. This season also included a game as goalkeeper in a game against Everton on 19 December 1995. Dicks took over the goalkeeper's gloves after regular 'keeper, Ludek Miklosko had been sent-off for a foul on Daniel Amokachi. He let in two goals as Everton won 3–0. He was named Man of the Match. In 1996–97 he scored twice in a crucial London derby against Tottenham Hotspur on 24 February 1997 at The Boleyn Ground that West Ham won 4–3. Before the game West Ham had not won in nine games. The game signified the start of a fight back against relegation from the Premier League. West Ham had been in 18th place before the game but would go on the finish 14th at the end of the season.

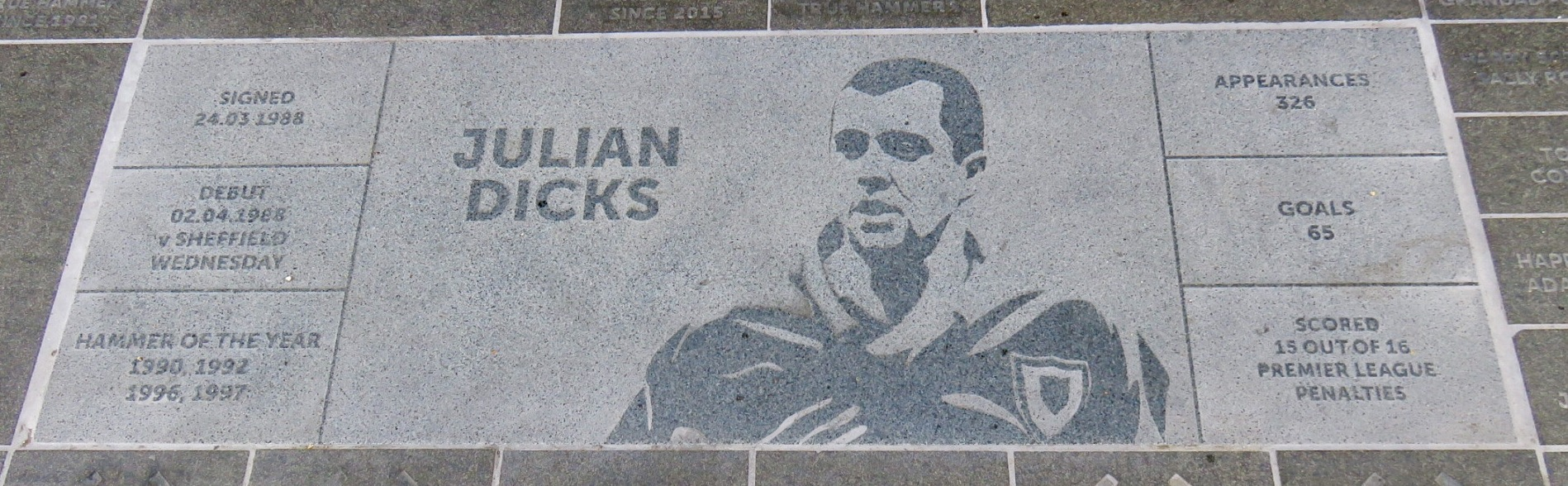
A commemorative stone for Dicks outside the London Stadium

Another knee injury resulted in him missing the entire 1997–98 season. He did return to action in the 1998–99 season and West Ham finished fifth to qualify for the UEFA Cup, but his injury problems failed to go away and he was restricted to just nine Premier League games. West Ham then terminated his contract and he retired from professional football after a 14-year career, 11 years of which had been spent at West Ham. In two spells at West Ham, he had played 315 competitive games and scored 64 goals, many of them penalties. His final appearance for the club came against Arsenal on 6 February 1999, with his final goal coming in the FA Cup against Swansea City on 2 January 1999.

In 2000 Dicks was granted a testimonial match by West Ham. On 13 August 2000 a West Ham eleven took on Spanish side Athletic Bilbao at the Boleyn Ground. The game was marred by a 17 player brawl in which West Ham player Igor Stimac was booked for a bad tackle and the West Ham captain for the day, Paolo Di Canio, slapped several Spanish players in the face. West Ham manager Harry Redknapp was ordered to remove Di Canio for the pitch to defuse the tension. Bilbao coach, Txetxu Rojo, was ordered to remove player Joseba Etxeberria for a similar reason. Bilbao won the game 2-1 Dicks received £200,000 from the game.

=== Canvey Island ===
In 2001, he made a brief return to football after signing for non-League Canvey Island. Only ten days after signing for Canvey Island, he was involved in an FA Cup shock. Playing against Football League side Wigan Athletic in the first round of the competition, Canvey turned-out 1-0 winners. The success continued in the next round. Again facing Football League opposition in Northampton Town, Canvey won 1–0 with a goal from Neil Gregory with a goal instigated with a move by Dicks.

== International career ==
Dicks made his debut for the England under-21 team in Lausanne, Switzerland in a friendly game against the Switzerland under-21 team on 28 May 1988. The game finished 1–1 with the England goal being scored by Paul Gascoigne. Dicks' performance convinced manager Dave Sexton to call him into the squad for the 1988 Toulon Tournament. He played in England's first game of the competition against the Mexico under-21 team in the Stade Mayol in Toulon on 5 June 1988. He was sent-off for a foul on a Mexican player. Undeterred by his sending-off, after missing one game through suspension, Sexton picked Dicks to play in the semi-final against the Morocco under-21 team and for the final against the France under-21 team which England lost 4–2. Four years later, in 1992, Dicks was called in to the England B team. He played only two games for the side; a 1–0 win in the Stadion Střelecký ostrov stadium, Budweis, Czechoslovakia against the Czechoslovakia team and a 1–1 draw in the Luzhniki Stadium, Moscow against the CIS team.

In 1995 England first team manager, Terry Venables, was putting together a squad to compete in Euro96 in England. Dicks' performances had earlier given rise to journalists to call for his inclusion in the squad. Two further disciplinary events ended such calls. On 11 September 1995 he was booked for stamping on the head of Chelsea's John Spencer in a 3–1 home defeat for West Ham. Spencer required eight stitches in his head. On 16 September 1995 at Highbury he was dismissed for the eighth time in his career for a foul on Arsenal's Ian Wright. The two incidents coming so close together caused the media to focus on the incident involving John Spencer. TV pundit Andy Gray and politician, radio journalist and Chelsea supporter, David Mellor called for FA to get involved. The game had been televised live on Sky TV and a recording of it was provided to the match referee, Robbie Hart who had booked Dicks during the game. The Sun newspaper ran a full back-page on the incident with several pictures of the challenge and of blood on Spencer's face. Mellor's radio program, 606, had focused so intently on the clash that combined with The Sun's coverage, public focus was sufficient for Dicks' daughters to be attacked at their school in Essex. The FA considered the video evidence provided and a report from referee Hart and Dicks was given a three-match ban. This ban put in doubt any future involvement in England squads due to concerns over his indiscipline and he was not called into the Euro 96 squad.

In 1997 with Glenn Hoddle now manager of England, Dicks met, by chance, his assistant, John Gorman whilst on holiday. Dicks claims Gorman had told him he would stand a better chance of being picked if he had grown his hair. Dicks frequently shaved his head sporting a skinhead hairstyle. Gorman also said that Dicks had been a candidate for selection for a game against Mexico in 1997. By this time Dicks had said he no longer wished to be considered for international selection.

== Coaching career ==
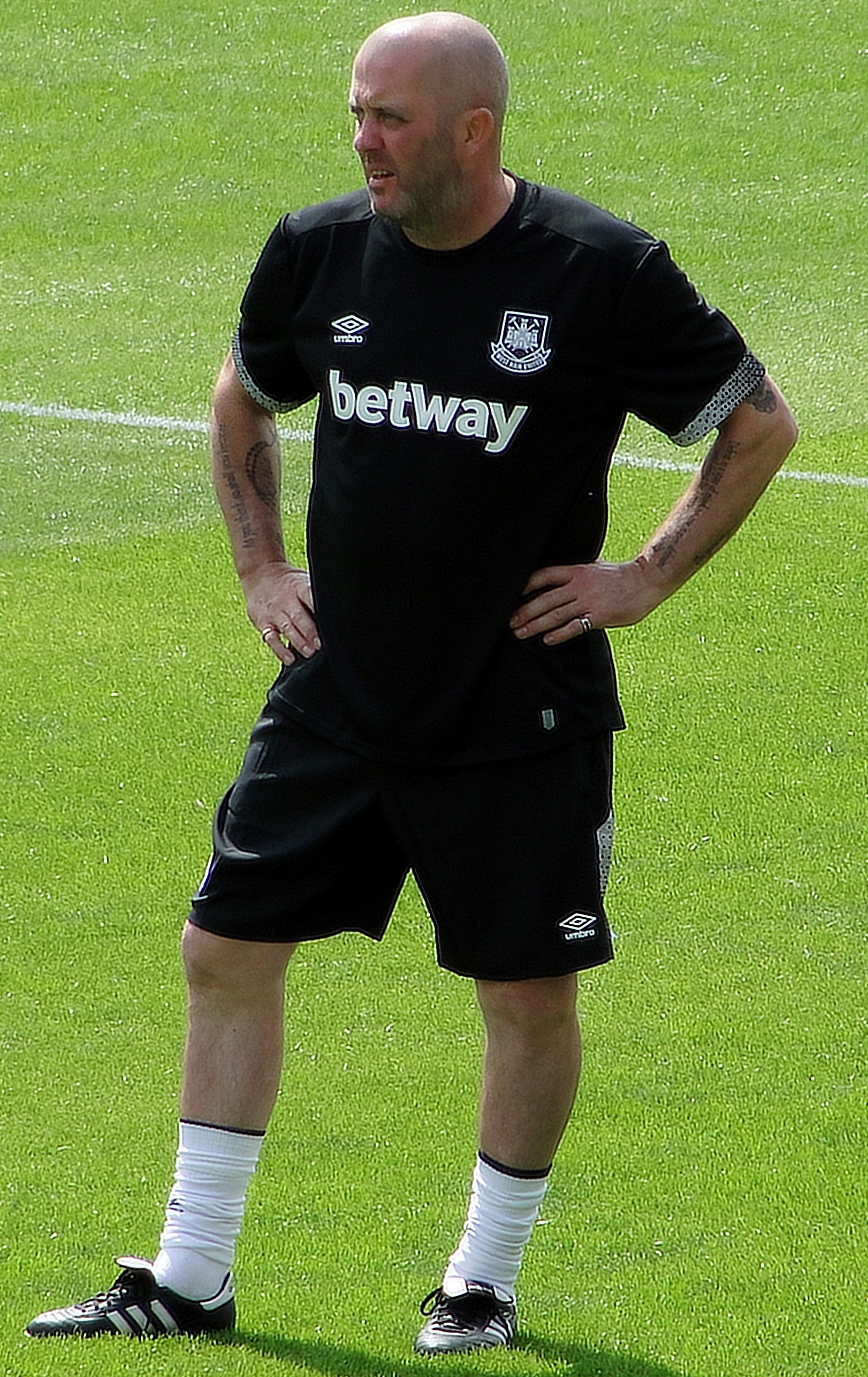
Dicks as coach for West Ham United, July 2015

=== Wivenhoe Town ===
Dicks returned to football on 5 January 2009 when he was appointed manager of Eastern Counties League side Wivenhoe Town, but left the club shortly after the end of that season by mutual consent.

=== Grays Athletic ===
Conference National club Grays Athletic announced Dicks as their new manager in mid-September 2009. In his first season at Grays, he was relegated from the Conference, whilst the club voluntarily dropped three levels to the Isthmian League Division One North. After finishing 10th in the following season, Dicks left Grays by mutual consent in May 2011.

=== Sealand ===
Dicks took take charge of the Sealand side at the Tynwald Hill International Football Tournament on the Isle of Man in July 2013.

=== West Ham United Ladies ===
On 19 June 2014, Dicks was appointed as a new manager of the West Ham United Ladies. His first competitive game was against Spurs Ladies. He helped to improve the team from their 10th-place finish that season and then to a sixth-placed finish in the 2014–15 season, along with a London FA Capital Women's Cup Final date against Charlton Athletic Ladies which West Ham ladies lost 5–0.

=== West Ham United ===
On 29 June 2015, Dicks was appointed first-team coach for his former team, West Ham United, under new manager and former teammate, Slaven Bilić. In June 2016, Dicks signed a contract to keep him on the coaching staff at West Ham for a further two years. When Bilić was sacked by West Ham in November 2017, Dicks also left the club.

=== Heybridge Swifts ===
On 4 October 2018, Dicks was appointed manager of Heybridge Swifts. His first two games as manager, against Mildenhall Town and Bury Town, resulted in wins for The Swifts. In May 2019, Heybridge Swifts won the 2018–19 Isthmian League Division One North play-off final against rivals Maldon & Tiptree, however were ineligible for promotion due to changes to the non-league pyramid system, leading Dicks to label the decision as "ridiculous". He left Heybridge to again work for Slaven Bilić, at West Bromwich Albion.

=== West Bromwich Albion ===
In July 2019, he joined the coaching staff at West Bromwich Albion. On 16 December 2020, following Bilić's sacking, Dicks left West Brom too.

=== Return to Heybridge Swifts ===
On 28 March 2021, Dicks' return to Heybridge Swifts as manager, from 1 July 2021, was announced by the club. On 3 July 2021, former Southend United manager Steve Tilson was named as his assistant manager, following Karl Duguid's departure from the club. On 15 September 2021, Dicks resigned from the role after suffering five consecutive defeats at the start of the season.

=== Watford ===
On 8 December 2022, Dicks was appointed assistant manager of EFL Championship side Watford, returning to England after a stint in the United States working as technical director at Carolina Velocity.

=== Third spell at Heybridge Swifts ===
On 27 May 2024, Dicks was appointed manager of Heybridge Swifts for a third time. On 12 October 2025, Heybridge announced Dicks had resigned as manager.

=== Chelmsford City ===
On 11 February 2026, Chelmsford City announced Dicks had joined the club's backroom coaching staff.

== Personal life ==
Dicks met his wife Kay in 1985 and they married in 1988. They had twin daughters Jessica and Katie in December 1988. The couple were married for 13 years until divorcing in 2001. His brother, Grantley is also a former footballer and coach. After retiring as a footballer, Dicks took up golf and soon turned professional, but was forced to give this career up due to his knee injury and the realisation that he did not have the ability to win tournaments. He went on to run the Shepherd and Dog Public House in Langham, near Colchester, Essex.

== Acting career ==
In 2014, he made a cameo appearance in the spoof football violence film The Hooligan Factory.

== Honours ==
Individual

- PFA Team of the Year: 1986–87 Second Division, 1989–90 Second Division
