= Gary Strodder =

English footballer

Personal information
- Date of birth: 1 April 1965 (age 61)
- Place of birth: Cleckheaton, England
- Height: 6 ft 1 in (1.85 m)
- Position: Centre back

Youth career
- Yorkshire Amateur

Senior career*
Years	Team	Apps	(Gls)
1982–1987	Lincoln City	132	(6)
1987–1990	West Ham United	65	(2)
1990–1995	West Bromwich Albion	140	(8)
1995–1999	Notts County	121	(10)
1998–1999	→ Rotherham United (loan)	3	(0)
1999–2001	Hartlepool United	61	(0)
- Guiseley
Total		522	(26)
- * Club domestic league appearances and goals

Gary Strodder (born 1 April 1965) is an English former professional footballer who played as a centre half.

== Career ==
Born in Cleckheaton, West Yorkshire, Strodder came through the youth system of Yorkshire Amateur. He joined Lincoln City in 1982, spending five years at the club and being voted the club's player of the year in 1986, before signing for West Ham United. After three years at West Ham, he moved on to West Bromwich Albion, who he helped to promotion via the playoff final at Wembley Stadium in a team managed by Argentinian and Tottenham Hotspur legend Ossie Ardiles. In 1996 he signed for Notts County, where he was selected for the Third Division PFA Team of the Year in 1997–98. In 1998–99 he had a spell on loan at Rotherham United, before joining Hartlepool United. In 2001 he dropped into non-League football with Guiseley. After retiring from playing he worked for the community development section at Leeds United, before going into business in Menorca.

== Honours ==
Lincoln City

- Football League Group Cup runner-up: 1982–83

West Bromwich Albion

- Football League Second Division play-offs: 1993

Notts County

- Football League Third Division: 1997–98

Individual

- PFA Team of the Year: 1997–98 Third Division
