= Leroy Rosenior =

English footballer, coach, and pundit

Leroy Rosenior MBE
Personal information
- Full name: Leroy De Graft Rosenior
- Date of birth: 24 August 1964 (age 62)
- Place of birth: London, England
- Height: 6 ft 1 in (1.85 m)
- Position: Forward

Senior career*
Years	Team	Apps	(Gls)
1982–1985	Fulham	54	(15)
1985–1987	Queens Park Rangers	38	(8)
1987–1988	Fulham	34	(20)
1988–1992	West Ham United	53	(15)
1990–1991	→ Fulham (loan)	11	(3)
1991–1992	→ Charlton Athletic (loan)	3	(0)
1992–1994	Bristol City	51	(12)
1994–1996	Fleet Town		
1996–1998	Gloucester City	28	(2)
Total		272	(75)

International career
- England U16
- England U21
1993	Sierra Leone	1	(0)

Managerial career
- 1996–1998: Gloucester City
- 2001–2002: Merthyr Tydfil
- 2002–2006: Torquay United
- 2006: Brentford
- 2007: Sierra Leone
- 2007: Torquay United
- * Club domestic league appearances and goals

Leroy De Graft Rosenior MBE (born 24 August 1964) is a football coach and pundit. He is a former footballer whose clubs included Fulham, Queens Park Rangers, Bristol City and West Ham United. Rosenior represented his birthplace England as a youth international, before formally switching to represent the Sierra Leone national team.

Rosenior has managed clubs including Gloucester City, Merthyr Tydfil, Torquay United, Brentford and was assistant to Gary Peters at Shrewsbury Town.

== Playing career ==
=== Club career ===
Rosenior was a forward for most of his career although towards the end of his playing days at Gloucester City he also turned out at centre-back, even in goal in a match against Kingstonian. He started at Fulham, also playing for Queens Park Rangers, West Ham United, Charlton Athletic, Bristol City and Fleet Town.

=== International career ===
He played for England at Under-16 and Under-21 levels but later changed allegiance to represent the Sierra Leone national team. In total he gained one cap for Sierra Leone, it came in the form of a 1994 African Nations Cup qualifying game versus Togo in Conakry on 9 January 1993. Togo later withdrew from the competition.

== Coaching and managerial career ==
After a period as Bristol City's youth team coach Rosenior's first managerial post was with Southern League Premier side Gloucester City. His first full season in charge saw Gloucester lose a third replay in the FA Trophy semi-final to Dagenham and Redbridge and defeat on the final day of the season to Salisbury City cost a place in the Football Conference, with local rivals Cheltenham Town being promoted. Rosenior left the following season, taking over Bristol City's reserve side.

Rosenior returned to non-league, managing Merthyr Tydfil before moving to Torquay United in July 2002. In his second season in charge he took Torquay to promotion to Football League One, but was unable to keep them there, experiencing relegation on the last day of the season. The return to Football League Two heralded the departure of Alex Russell and Adebayo Akinfenwa, two of the club's best players. After languishing near the bottom of the league for half the season, Leroy left the club by mutual consent in January 2006, after a 3–1 home defeat to Rochdale.

In March 2006, he was named first team coach at Shrewsbury Town, acting as assistant to manager Gary Peters. He left in June 2006 to take up the managerial position at Brentford, succeeding Martin Allen. 20 years earlier he had replaced Allen when he came on as a substitute in the 1986 League Cup final. Five months after his appointment, Rosenior left the club, after a run of 16 games without a win, which culminated in a 4–0 home defeat to Crewe Alexandra.

He was scheduled to take charge of the Sierra Leone national side for a friendly against Leyton Orient in May 2007, which they won 4–2. It was announced in May 2007 that he would take charge of Sierra Leone in their upcoming African Nations Qualifiers.

Rosenior was to return to Torquay United as head coach on 1 June 2007, replacing Keith Curle, but some 10 minutes after his appointment was announced on 17 May, the club was bought by a local consortium which installed Colin Lee as chief executive, who then appointed former Gulls player and Exeter City assistant manager Paul Buckle as manager.

== Life after coaching ==
Rosenior works as a presenter and pundit on G-Sports, an African pay-per-view channel, and for the BBC's coverage of the 2008 Africa Cup of Nations. Other punditry work has included BBC Radio 5 Live as well as The Football League Show and The League Cup Show on BBC television. He also appeared alongside fellow ex-pro Graeme Murty and presenter James Richardson in the BBC South, BBC South West and BBC West local Monday night football round-up show Late Kick Off.

Rosenior is a leading anti-racism campaigner in British football and travels the country working as an ambassador for the Show Racism The Red Card campaign. He was awarded an MBE in the 2019 New Year Honours, for his work in tackling discrimination in football and elsewhere in society.

== Personal life ==
His son, Liam, is a professional football manager and former player who was appointed as the head coach of Ligue 1 side Paris FC in July 2026, after a brief stint as manager of Chelsea earlier in the year. Leroy's eldest sister, Lauren, was the first black woman to win engineer of the year in the UK.

The experiences of his father, who immigrated from Sierra Leone to England, are one of the influences of Leroy's views against racism. The death of his idol and fellow footballer Justin Fashanu was another moment that shaped his views on the importance to promote education.

== Honours ==
=== Player ===
Queens Park Rangers

- Football League Cup runner-up: 1985–86

Individual

- PFA Team of the Year: 1987–88 Third Division
- Fulham Player of the Year: 1987
- Fulham Young Player of the Year: 1982

=== Manager ===
Torquay United

- Football League Third Division promotion: 2003–04
