= George Parris =

English footballer (born 1964)

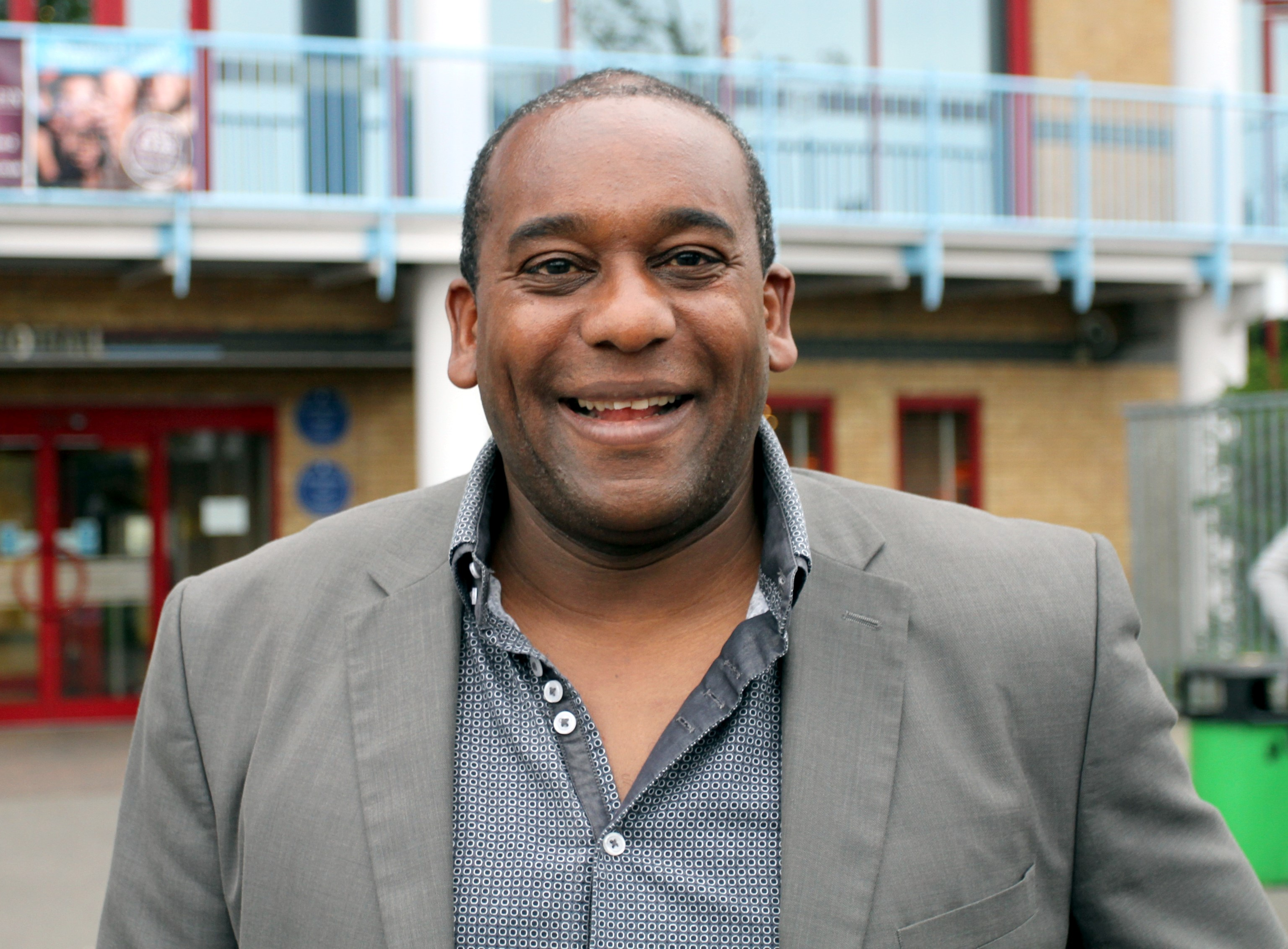
- Parris at Upton Park in 2015

Personal information
- Full name: George Michael Parris
- Date of birth: 11 September 1964 (age 62)
- Place of birth: Barking, England
- Height: 5 ft 9 in (1.75 m)
- Positions: Midfielder; defender

Senior career*
Years	Team	Apps	(Gls)
1982–1993	West Ham United	239	(12)
1993–1995	Birmingham City	39	(1)
1994	→ Brentford (loan)	5	(0)
1994	→ Bristol City (loan)	6	(0)
1995	→ Brighton & Hove Albion (loan)	18	(2)
1995	IFK Norrköping	4	(0)
1995–1997	Brighton & Hove Albion	56	(3)
1997	Southend United	1	(0)
1997	→ Kettering Town (loan)		
1997–1998	St Leonards		
- Shoreham

International career
- England Schoolboys

Managerial career
- Shoreham (player-manager)
- 2008–2009: Whitehawk
- 2016–2017: Brighton & Hove Albion Women
- * Club domestic league appearances and goals

George Michael R. Parris (born 11 September 1964) is an English former professional footballer who played as a midfielder or defender for West Ham United, Birmingham City, and Brighton & Hove Albion.

== Early life and education ==
George Michael R. Parris was born on 11 September 1964 in Barking, Essex.

He played district, county, and national football for Redbridge, Greater London, and England Under-15 as a schoolboy. He was invited to train at West Ham United when he was 13 and signed as an apprentice in July 1981 when he left Seven Kings High school.

== Career ==
=== West Ham United ===
Parris turned professional the following year in September 1982. A lengthy spell of reserve team football followed before he made his First Division debut in the final match of the 1984–85 season at home against Liverpool in May 1985. He made a handful of appearances in the first half of the 1985–86 season, then replaced the injured Steve Walford at left-back and impressed as the West Ham won 11 of their last 14 games to finish third in the table. Parris made 48 league and cup games appearances in the 1986–87 season. The arrival of left-back Tommy McQueen in March 1987 saw Parris move briefly to midfield but he returned to the left-back position for much of the 1987–88 season until the arrival of Julian Dicks in March 1988, whose form led to Parris playing at right-back or midfield for most of the rest of his career at West Ham.

He made 32 league and cup appearance in the 1988–89 season as West Ham reached the semi-finals of the League Cup but were relegated to Division Two, and 49 league and cup appearances in the 1989–90 season as West Ham again reached the semi-finals of the League Cup. He made 55 league and cup appearances in the 1990–91 season, returning to left-back when Julian Dicks suffered a severe knee injury in October 1990, scoring in four successive games in January 1991 and helping West Ham to promotion back to the First Division and to the semi-finals of the FA Cup. His performances that season saw him voted as runner-up to Ludek Miklosko as 'Hammer of the Year'. Parris made only 27 league and cup appearances in the 1991–92 season; he suffered a knee injury against Aston Villa on Boxing Day that required surgery, and then collapsed during his comeback game against Arsenal in March 1992 with a suspected heart-related problem. He returned to the first team in the opening game of the 1992–93 season against Barnsley and made 18 league and cup appearances before Birmingham City made an offer for him in March 1993. Parris had made 300 first-team appearances for West Ham, scoring 20 goals. In April 1995, after he had left the club, Parris was granted a testimonial by West Ham. Played in front of only 1,382 fans a West Ham team lost 3–2 to Ipswich Town at The Boleyn Ground.

During his time with West Ham, Parris was subjected to much racial abuse, including having a banana thrown at him. He picked it up and ate it, making a gesture as if to say "Thanks! I needed that!".

=== Birmingham City ===
Parris joined Birmingham City in March 1993 for a fee of £100,000, where he was made captain. Injuries and a change of manager in November 1993 saw him fall out of favour and he spent the 1994–95 season on loan at Brentford, Bristol City and Brighton & Hove Albion before being released. Parris had made 42 league and cup appearances for Birmingham City.

=== Brighton and Hove Albion ===
After a trial with Stoke and a short spell with Norrköping in Sweden, Parris signed a permanent deal with Brighton in September 1995 and stayed for two seasons. He was made captain and made 63 first-team appearances before being released on a free transfer in May 1997. He was best remembered for an impudent goal against Bristol Rovers in October 1995 when he came from behind the Rovers goalkeeper as he released the ball to dispossess him and score.

== Later career ==
After leaving Brighton, Parris played one league game on a non-contract basis for Southend and also played for non-league clubs Kettering Town, St Leonards, where he was also assistant manager, and Shoreham, where he was player-manager. After retiring from playing, he worked as a part-time activities organiser at the Ovingdean Hall School for deaf children in Sussex, and went on to work as a sports coach at the University of Sussex. In April 2008 he was appointed manager of Sussex County League club Whitehawk. As of 2012, Parris was also operating a soccer coaching school based in Brighton. In April 2016, Parris was appointed interim manager of Brighton & Hove Albion Women. He agreed to remain in post for the FA WSL Spring Series, before standing down to be replaced by Hope Powell.

== Autobiography ==
In 2005 his autobiography, "My Name is George...I am a Compulsive Gambler" was published. During his playing days Parris became addicted to gambling, amassing debts, after leaving West Ham to join Birmingham City.
