= Paul Hilton (footballer) =

English footballer

Personal information
- Date of birth: 8 October 1959 (age 67)
- Place of birth: Oldham, England
- Height: 6 ft 1 in (1.85 m)
- Position: Central defender

Youth career
- Chadderton

Senior career*
Years	Team	Apps	(Gls)
1978–1984	Bury	148	(39)
1984–1989	West Ham United	60	(7)
Total		208	(46)
- * Club domestic league appearances and goals

Paul Hilton (born 8 October 1959) is an English former professional footballer who played as a central defender making over 200 career appearances.

== Career ==
Born in Oldham, Hilton represented England at under 18 level and played for Chadderton, Bury and West Ham United. Hilton was signed by West Ham manager, John Lyall, after he had appeared for Bury in a 10-0 League Cup defeat by West Ham. At the end of his playing career he became a coach under West Ham manager Billy Bonds and was appointed as youth team and then reserve team coach. In 2001, he was appointed coach at Ipswich Town. Hilton has also spent time as youth coach at Gillingham and in 2011 he was appointed head of youth at Stevenage.
