= 1994–95 West Ham United F.C. season =

English football team season

West Ham United
1994–95 season
- Chairman: Terry Brown
- Manager: Harry Redknapp
- Stadium: Boleyn Ground
- FA Premier League: 14th
- FA Cup: Fourth round
- League Cup: Fourth round
- Top goalscorer: League: Tony Cottee (13); All: Tony Cottee (15)
- Highest home attendance: 24,783 vs Manchester United (14 May 1995, FA Premier League)
- Lowest home attendance: 13,553 vs Walsall (5 Oct 1994, League Cup)
- Average home league attendance: 20,118
Home colours

During the 1994–95 English football season, West Ham United F.C. competed in the FA Premier League.

== Season summary ==
Before the season started, the West Ham board of directors heard speculation that assistant manager Harry Redknapp was about to be offered his old job as Bournemouth manager. They reacted by dismissing manager Billy Bonds and promoting Redknapp to the manager's seat. Redknapp then earned the instant admiration of the Upton Park faithful by signing Don Hutchison and re-signing striker Tony Cottee, who returned to the club after six years at Everton. Redknapp also strengthened the squad over the next months by bringing in Julian Dicks, Les Sealey and Stan Lazaridis.

The Hammers spent much of the season battling against relegation, but a good run of form during the final month pulled them up to a secure 14th-place finish.

== Final league table ==
Pos	Team	Pld	W	D	L	GF	GA	GD	Pts	Qualification or relegation
12	Arsenal	42	13	12	17	52	49	+3	51	
13	Sheffield Wednesday	42	13	12	17	49	57	−8	51	Qualification for the Intertoto Cup group stage
14	West Ham United	42	13	11	18	44	48	−4	50	
15	Everton	42	11	17	14	44	51	−7	50	Qualification for the Cup Winners' Cup first round (Note: Everton qualified for the Cup Winners' Cup as FA Cup winners.)
16	Coventry City	42	12	14	16	44	62	−18	50	

Source: Premier League
Rules for classification: 1) points; 2) goal difference; 3) number of goals scored.
Notes:

Results summary

Overall								Home						Away					
Pld	W	D	L	GF	GA	GD	Pts	W	D	L	GF	GA	GD	W	D	L	GF	GA	GD
42	13	11	18	44	48	−4	50	9	6	6	28	19	+9	4	5	12	16	29	−13

Source: Statto

Results by matchday

Match	1	2	3	4	5	6	7	8	9	10	11	12	13	14	15	16	17	18	19	20	21	22	23	24	25	26	27	28	29	30	31	32	33	34	35	36	37	38	39	40	41	42
Ground	H	A	A	H	A	H	H	A	H	A	H	A	A	H	A	H	A	A	H	H	A	H	A	H	H	A	H	A	H	A	A	H	A	A	A	H	A	H	H	A	H	H
Result	D	L	L	L	D	W	L	W	W	L	W	L	L	W	L	L	L	D	W	D	L	W	L	L	L	W	D	L	L	W	L	D	D	W	D	W	D	W	D	L	W	D
Position	13	18	19	21	19	17	19	15	13	14	12	14	14	14	17	17	18	19	17	18	18	16	16	19	20	19	20	20	20	19	19	18	19	18	20	17	18	16	15	16	13	14

Source: Statto.com
A = Away; H = Home; W = Win; D = Draw; L = Loss

== Results ==
West Ham United's score comes first

=== Legend ===
Win	Draw	Loss

=== FA Premier League ===
Date	Opponent	Venue	Result	Attendance	Scorers
20 August 1994	Leeds United	H	0–0	18,610	
24 August 1994	Manchester City	A	0–3	19,150	
27 August 1994	Norwich City	A	0–1	19,110	
31 August 1994	Newcastle United	H	1–3	17,375	Hutchison (pen)
10 September 1994	Liverpool	A	0–0	30,907	
17 September 1994	Aston Villa	H	1–0	18,326	Cottee
25 September 1994	Arsenal	H	0–2	18,495	
2 October 1994	Chelsea	A	2–1	18,696	Allen, Moncur
8 October 1994	Crystal Palace	H	1–0	16,959	Hutchison
15 October 1994	Manchester United	A	0–1	43,795	
22 October 1994	Southampton	H	2–0	18,853	Rush, Allen
29 October 1994	Tottenham Hotspur	A	1–3	26,271	Rush
1 November 1994	Everton	A	0–1	28,353	
5 November 1994	Leicester City	H	1–0	18,780	Dicks (pen)
19 November 1994	Sheffield Wednesday	A	0–1	25,300	
26 November 1994	Coventry City	H	0–1	17,251	
4 December 1994	Queens Park Rangers	A	1–2	12,780	Boere
10 December 1994	Leeds United	A	2–2	28,987	Boere (2)
17 December 1994	Manchester City	H	3–0	17,286	Cottee (3)
26 December 1994	Ipswich Town	H	1–1	20,562	Cottee
28 December 1994	Wimbledon	A	0–1	11,212	
31 December 1994	Nottingham Forest	H	3–1	20,664	Holmes, Hughes, Cottee
2 January 1995	Blackburn Rovers	A	2–4	25,503	Cottee, Dicks
14 January 1995	Tottenham Hotspur	H	1–2	24,578	Boere
23 January 1995	Sheffield Wednesday	H	0–2	14,554	
4 February 1995	Leicester City	A	2–1	20,375	Cottee, Dicks (pen)
13 February 1995	Everton	H	2–2	21,081	Cottee (2)
18 February 1995	Coventry City	A	0–2	17,563	
25 February 1995	Chelsea	H	1–2	21,500	Hutchison
5 March 1995	Arsenal	A	1–0	36,295	Hutchison
8 March 1995	Newcastle United	A	0–2	34,595	
11 March 1995	Norwich City	H	2–2	21,464	Cottee (2)
15 March 1995	Southampton	A	1–1	15,178	Hutchison
18 March 1995	Aston Villa	A	2–0	28,682	Moncur, Hutchison
8 April 1995	Nottingham Forest	A	1–1	28,361	Dicks
13 April 1995	Wimbledon	H	3–0	21,804	Boere, Dicks (pen), Cottee
17 April 1995	Ipswich Town	A	1–1	18,882	Boere
30 April 1995	Blackburn Rovers	H	2–0	24,202	Hutchison, Rieper
3 May 1995	Queens Park Rangers	H	0–0	22,923	
6 May 1995	Crystal Palace	A	0–1	18,224	
10 May 1995	Liverpool	H	3–0	22,446	Hutchison (2), Holmes
14 May 1995	Manchester United	H	1–1	24,783	Hughes

=== FA Cup ===
Round	Date	Opponent	Venue	Result	Attendance	Goalscorers
R3	7 January 1995	Wycombe Wanderers	A	2–0	9,007	Brown, Cottee
R4	28 January 1995	Queens Park Rangers	A	0–1	17,694	

=== League Cup ===
Round	Date	Opponent	Venue	Result	Attendance	Goalscorers
R2 1st Leg	20 September 1994	Walsall	A	1–2	5,994	Ntamark (own goal)
R2 2nd Leg	5 October 1994	Walsall	H	2–0 (won 3–2 on agg)	13,553	Hutchison, Moncur
R3	26 October 1994	Chelsea	H	1–0	18,815	Hutchison 2'
R4	30 November 1994	Bolton Wanderers	H	1–3	18,190	Cottee

== Squad ==
Squad at end of season

Note: Flags indicate national team as defined under FIFA eligibility rules; some limited exceptions apply. Players may hold more than one non-FIFA nationality.

No.	Pos.	Nation	Player
1	GK	CZE	Luděk Mikloško
2	DF	ENG	Tim Breacker
3	DF	ENG	Julian Dicks (captain)
4	DF	ENG	Steve Potts (vice-captain)
5	DF	ENG	Alvin Martin
6	MF	ENG	Martin Allen
7	MF	ENG	Ian Bishop
8	DF	DEN	Marc Rieper
9	FW	ENG	Trevor Morley
10	MF	ENG	John Moncur
11	MF	ENG	Matty Holmes
12	DF	NIR	Keith Rowland
14	MF	ENG	Matthew Rush

No.	Pos.	Nation	Player
15	DF	ENG	Kenny Brown
16	FW	GER	Dieter Eckstein (on loan from Schalke)
17	MF	NIR	Michael Hughes (on loan from Strasbourg)
18	DF	ENG	Simon Webster
20	MF	ENG	Danny Williamson
21	GK	USA	Ian Feuer
22	DF	ENG	Adrian Whitbread
23	MF	ENG	Dale Gordon
24	MF	ENG	Paul Mitchell
25	FW	NED	Jeroen Boere
26	MF	ENG	Don Hutchison
27	FW	ENG	Tony Cottee
30	GK	ENG	Les Sealey

=== Left club during season ===
Note: Flags indicate national team as defined under FIFA eligibility rules; some limited exceptions apply. Players may hold more than one non-FIFA nationality.

No.	Pos.	Nation	Player
3	DF	ENG	David Burrows (to Everton)
8	MF	ENG	Peter Butler (to Notts County)
16	FW	ENG	Lee Chapman (to Ipswich Town)

No.	Pos.	Nation	Player
17	FW	ENG	Steve Jones (to Bournemouth)
19	FW	ENG	Mike Marsh (to Coventry City)
28	MF	IRL	Matt Holland (to Bournemouth)

=== Reserve squad ===
Note: Flags indicate national team as defined under FIFA eligibility rules; some limited exceptions apply. Players may hold more than one non-FIFA nationality.

No.	Pos.	Nation	Player
—	DF	ENG	Jamie Victory
—	MF	ENG	Scott Canham

No.	Pos.	Nation	Player
—	FW	ENG	Lee Hodges
—	FW	ENG	Mark Watson

== Transfers ==
=== In ===
Date	Pos	Name	From	Fee
22 June 1994	MF	Joey Beauchamp	Oxford United	£1,000,000
24 June 1994	MF	John Moncur	Swindon Town	£900,000
17 August 1994	DF	Adrian Whitbread	Swindon Town	£500,000
30 August 1994	MF	Don Hutchison	Liverpool	£1,500,000
7 September 1994	FW	Tony Cottee	Everton	Transfer
28 November 1994	GK	Les Sealey	Blackpool	Free transfer
6 May 1995	FW	Mark Watson	Sutton United	Signed
13 May 1995	DF	Marc Rieper	Brøndby	£1,100,000

=== Out ===
Date	Pos	Name	To	Fee
31 May 1994	DF	Tony Gale	Wealdstone	Free transfer
18 August 1994	MF	Joey Beauchamp	Swindon Town	£850,000
6 September 1994	DF	David Burrows	Everton	Transfer
4 October 1994	MF	Peter Butler	Notts County	£350,000
21 October 1994	FW	Steve Jones	Bournemouth	£150,000
30 December 1994	FW	Mike Marsh	Coventry City	£450,000
19 January 1995	FW	Lee Chapman	Ipswich Town	£70,000
25 April 1995	MF	Matt Holland	Bournemouth	Free transfer

Transfers in: ▼£5,000,000
Transfers out: ▲£1,870,000
Total spending: ▼£3,130,000

== Statistics ==
=== Appearances and goals ===
No.	Pos	Nat	Player	Total		FA Premier League		FA Cup		League Cup	
No.	Pos	Nat	Player	Apps	Goals	Apps	Goals	Apps	Goals	Apps	Goals
Goalkeepers
1	GK	(Czech Republic) CZE	Luděk Mikloško	48	0	42	0	2	0	4	0
Defenders
2	DF	(England) ENG	Tim Breacker	38	0	33	0	2	0	3	0
3	DF	(England) ENG	Julian Dicks	33	5	29	5	2	0	2	0
4	DF	(England) ENG	Steve Potts	48	0	42	0	2	0	4	0
5	DF	(England) ENG	Alvin Martin	28	0	24	0	2	0	2	0
8	DF	(Denmark) DEN	Marc Rieper	21	1	17+4	1	0	0	0	0
12	DF	(Northern Ireland) NIR	Keith Rowland	14	0	11+1	0	0	0	2	0
15	DF	(England) ENG	Kenny Brown	12	1	8+1	0	0+1	1	1+1	0
18	DF	(England) ENG	Simon Webster	5	0	0+5	0	0	0	0	0
22	DF	(England) ENG	Adrian Whitbread	11	0	3+5	0	0	0	2+1	0
Midfielders
6	MF	(England) ENG	Martin Allen	33	2	26+3	2	1	0	3	0
7	MF	(England) ENG	Ian Bishop	36	1	31	1	2	0	3	0
10	MF	(England) ENG	John Moncur	35	3	30	2	2	0	3	1
11	MF	(England) ENG	Matty Holmes	26	1	24	1	1	0	1	0
14	MF	(England) ENG	Matthew Rush	26	2	15+8	2	0	0	3	0
17	MF	(Northern Ireland) NIR	Michael Hughes	19	2	15+2	2	2	0	0	0
20	MF	(England) ENG	Danny Williamson	4	0	4	0	0	0	0	0
26	MF	(Scotland) SCO	Don Hutchison	27	11	22+1	9	0+1	0	3	2
Forwards
9	FW	(England) ENG	Trevor Morley	16	0	10+4	0	0+1	0	0+1	0
25	FW	(Netherlands) NED	Jeroen Boere	23	6	15+5	6	2	0	1	0
27	FW	(England) ENG	Tony Cottee	36	15	31	13	2	1	3	1
Players who left the club permanently or on loan during the season
3	DF	(England) ENG	David Burrows	4	0	4	0	0	0	0	0
8	MF	(England) ENG	Peter Butler	5	0	5	0	0	0	0	0
16	FW	(England) ENG	Lee Chapman	12	0	7+3	0	0	0	1+1	0
17	FW	(England) ENG	Steve Jones	2	0	1+1	0	0	0	0	0
19	FW	(England) ENG	Mike Marsh	19	0	13+3	0	0	0	3	0
