= 1995–96 West Ham United F.C. season =

English football team season

West Ham United F.C.
1995–96 season
- Chairman: Terry Brown
- Manager: Harry Redknapp
- Stadium: Upton Park
- FA Premier League: 10th
- FA Cup: Fourth round
- League Cup: Third round
- Top goalscorer: League: Tony Cottee/Julian Dicks (10); All: Tony Cottee (12)
- Highest home attendance: 24,324 vs Liverpool (22 November 1995, FA Premier League)
- Lowest home attendance: 15,375 vs Bristol Rovers (4 October 1995, League Cup)
- Average home league attendance: 22,340
Home colours

During the 1995–96 English football season, West Ham United competed in the FA Premier League.

== Season summary ==
West Ham progressed further following the previous season's 14th-place finish (and last-minute scramble away from relegation danger) and climbed to 10th place in the final table – their best finish since they came third in 1986. They were never in any danger of going down, but they never looked like challenging for a UEFA Cup spot. Nor did they make much of an impact in the cup competitions, though striker Tony Cottee showed little sign of his advancing years, coming joint top scorer with penalty taking left-back Julian Dicks.

Manager Harry Redknapp spent heavily over the summer, mostly on foreign players, in hope of building a West Ham side capable of chasing European qualification and major trophies.

The season also brought the debut of two teenage players - defender Rio Ferdinand and midfielder Frank Lampard.

== Final league table ==
Pos	Team	Pld	W	D	L	GF	GA	GD	Pts
8	Tottenham Hotspur	38	16	13	9	50	38	+12	61
9	Nottingham Forest	38	15	13	10	50	54	−4	58
10	West Ham United	38	14	9	15	43	52	−9	51
11	Chelsea	38	12	14	12	46	44	+2	50
12	Middlesbrough	38	11	10	17	35	50	−15	43

Source: Premier League
Rules for classification: 1) points; 2) goal difference; 3) number of goals scored.

== Results ==
West Ham United's score comes first

=== Legend ===
Win	Draw	Loss

=== FA Premier League ===
Date	Opponent	Venue	Result	Attendance	Scorers
19 August 1995	Leeds United	H	1–2	22,901	Williamson
23 August 1995	Manchester United	A	1–2	31,966	Bruce (own goal)
26 August 1995	Nottingham Forest	A	1–1	26,645	Allen
30 August 1995	Tottenham Hotspur	H	1–1	23,516	Hutchison
11 September 1995	Chelsea	H	1–3	19,228	Hutchison
16 September 1995	Arsenal	A	0–1	38,065	
23 September 1995	Everton	H	2–1	21,085	Dicks (2 pens)
2 October 1995	Southampton	A	0–0	13,568	
16 October 1995	Wimbledon	A	1–0	9,411	Cottee
21 October 1995	Blackburn Rovers	H	1–1	21,776	Dowie
28 October 1995	Sheffield Wednesday	A	1–0	23,917	Dowie
4 November 1995	Aston Villa	H	1–4	23,637	Dicks (pen)
18 November 1995	Bolton Wanderers	A	3–0	19,047	Bishop, Cottee, Williamson
22 November 1995	Liverpool	H	0–0	24,324	
25 November 1995	Queens Park Rangers	H	1–0	21,504	Cottee
2 December 1995	Blackburn Rovers	A	2–4	26,638	Dicks (pen), Slater
11 December 1995	Everton	A	0–3	31,778	
16 December 1995	Southampton	H	2–1	18,501	Cottee, Dowie
23 December 1995	Middlesbrough	A	2–4	28,640	Cottee, Dicks
1 January 1996	Manchester City	A	1–2	26,024	Dowie
13 January 1996	Leeds United	A	0–2	30,658	
22 January 1996	Manchester United	H	0–1	24,197	
31 January 1996	Coventry City	H	3–2	18,884	Cottee, Rieper, Dowie
3 February 1996	Nottingham Forest	H	1–0	21,257	Slater
12 February 1996	Tottenham Hotspur	A	1–0	29,781	Dani
17 February 1996	Chelsea	A	2–1	25,252	Dicks, Williamson
21 February 1996	Newcastle United	H	2–0	23,843	Williamson, Cottee
24 February 1996	Arsenal	H	0–1	24,217	
2 March 1996	Coventry City	A	2–2	17,459	Cottee, Rieper
9 March 1996	Middlesbrough	H	2–0	23,850	Dowie, Dicks (pen)
18 March 1996	Newcastle United	A	0–3	36,331	
23 March 1996	Manchester City	H	4–2	24,017	Dowie (2), Dicks, Dani
6 April 1996	Wimbledon	H	1–1	20,402	Dicks
8 April 1996	Liverpool	A	0–2	40,326	
13 April 1996	Bolton Wanderers	H	1–0	23,086	Cottee
17 April 1996	Aston Villa	A	1–1	26,768	Cottee
27 April 1996	Queens Park Rangers	A	0–3	18,828	
5 May 1996	Sheffield Wednesday	H	1–1	23,790	Dicks

=== FA Cup ===
Round	Date	Opponent	Venue	Result	Attendance	Goalscorers
R3	6 January 1996	Southend United	H	2–0	23,284	Moncur, Hughes
R4	7 February 1996	Grimsby Town	H	1–1	22,030	Dowie
R4R	14 February 1996	Grimsby Town	A	0–3	8,382	

=== League Cup ===
Round	Date	Opponent	Venue	Result	Attendance	Goalscorers
R2 1st Leg	20 September 1995	Bristol Rovers	A	1–0	7,103	Moncur
R2 2nd Leg	4 October 1995	Bristol Rovers	H	3–0 (won 4–0 on agg)	15,375	Dicks (pen), Bishop, Cottee
R3	25 October 1995	Southampton	A	1–2	11,059	Cottee

== First-team squad ==
Squad at end of season

Note: Flags indicate national team as defined under FIFA eligibility rules; some limited exceptions apply. Players may hold more than one non-FIFA nationality.

No.	Pos.	Nation	Player
1	GK	CZE	Luděk Mikloško
2	DF	ENG	Tim Breacker
3	DF	ENG	Julian Dicks
4	DF	ENG	Steve Potts
5	DF	ENG	Alvin Martin
7	MF	ENG	Ian Bishop
8	DF	DEN	Marc Rieper
9	FW	ENG	Tony Cottee
10	MF	ENG	John Moncur
11	FW	NED	Marco Boogers
12	DF	NIR	Keith Rowland
14	FW	NIR	Iain Dowie
15	DF	ENG	Kenny Brown
16	FW	POR	Dani (on loan from Sporting CP)

No.	Pos.	Nation	Player
17	MF	AUS	Stan Lazaridis
18	MF	ROU	Ilie Dumitrescu
19	MF	AUS	Robbie Slater
20	MF	ENG	Danny Williamson
21	GK	ENG	Peter Shilton
22	DF	ENG	Adrian Whitbread
23	MF	ENG	Dale Gordon
24	MF	NIR	Michael Hughes (on loan from RC Strasbourg)
26	MF	ENG	Frank Lampard
28	DF	CRO	Slaven Bilić
29	FW	ENG	Mark Watson
30	GK	ENG	Les Sealey
31	GK	ENG	Neil Finn
32	DF	ENG	Rio Ferdinand

=== Left club during season ===
Note: Flags indicate national team as defined under FIFA eligibility rules; some limited exceptions apply. Players may hold more than one non-FIFA nationality.

No.	Pos.	Nation	Player
6	MF	ENG	Martin Allen (to Portsmouth)
14	MF	ENG	Matthew Rush (to Norwich City)
16	MF	SCO	Don Hutchison (to Sheffield United)
18	MF	ENG	Simon Webster (retired)
21	GK	USA	Ian Feuer (to Luton Town)

No.	Pos.	Nation	Player
24	MF	ENG	Paul Mitchell (to Bournemouth)
25	FW	NED	Jeroen Boere (to Crystal Palace)
25	MF	USA	John Harkes (on loan from Derby County)
27	DF	ENG	Chris Whyte (on loan from Birmingham City)

=== Reserve squad ===
Note: Flags indicate national team as defined under FIFA eligibility rules; some limited exceptions apply. Players may hold more than one non-FIFA nationality.

No.	Pos.	Nation	Player
—	GK	AUS	Steve Mautone
—	DF	AUS	Chris Coyne
—	MF	ENG	Scott Canham

No.	Pos.	Nation	Player
—	MF	ENG	Darren Currie
—	MF	ENG	Emmanuel Omoyinmi

== Transfers ==
=== In ===
Date	Pos	Name	From	Fee
1 July 1995	FW	Marco Boogers	Sparta Rotterdam	£1,000,000
14 August 1995	MF	Robbie Slater	Blackburn Rovers	£600,000
8 September 1995	FW	Iain Dowie	Crystal Palace	£500,000
8 September 1995	MF	Stan Lazaridis	West Adelaide	£300,000
11 January 1996	GK	Peter Shilton	Coventry City	Free transfer
29 March 1996	GK	Steve Mautone	Canberra Cosmos	£30,000

=== Out ===
Date	Pos	Name	To	Fee
1 July 1995	DF	Jamie Victory	Bournemouth	Free transfer
15 August 1995	MF	Matty Holmes	Blackburn Rovers	£1,200,000
18 August 1995	MF	Matthew Rush	Norwich City	£330,000
7 September 1995	FW	Jeroen Boere	Crystal Palace	£375,000
3 November 1995	FW	Chris Moors	Torquay United	Free transfer
16 December 1995	GK	Ian Feuer	Luton Town	£580,000
10 January 1996	MF	Don Hutchison	Sheffield United	£1,200,000
7 February 1996	MF	Darren Currie	Shrewsbury Town	£70,000
22 February 1996	MF	Martin Allen	Portsmouth	£500,000
28 March 1996	MF	Paul Mitchell	Bournemouth	Free transfer

Transfers in: ▼£2,430,000
Transfers out: ▲£4,255,000
Total spending: ▲£1,825,000

== Statistics ==
=== Appearances and goals ===
No.	Pos	Nat	Player	Total		FA Premier League		FA Cup		League Cup	
No.	Pos	Nat	Player	Apps	Goals	Apps	Goals	Apps	Goals	Apps	Goals
Goalkeepers
1	GK	(Czech Republic) CZE	Luděk Mikloško	42	0	36	0	3	0	3	0
30	GK	(England) ENG	Les Sealey	2	0	1+1	0	0	0	0	0
31	GK	(England) ENG	Neil Finn	1	0	1	0	0	0	0	0
Defenders
2	DF	(England) ENG	Tim Breacker	24	0	19+3	0	0	0	2	0
3	DF	(England) ENG	Julian Dicks	40	11	34	10	3	0	3	1
4	DF	(England) ENG	Steve Potts	40	0	34	0	3	0	3	0
5	DF	(England) ENG	Alvin Martin	17	0	10+4	0	1	0	2	0
8	DF	(Denmark) DEN	Marc Rieper	42	2	35+1	2	3	0	2+1	0
12	DF	(Northern Ireland) NIR	Keith Rowland	25	0	19+4	0	1+1	0	0	0
15	DF	(England) ENG	Kenny Brown	3	0	3	0	0	0	0	0
22	DF	(England) ENG	Adrian Whitbread	3	0	0+2	0	1	0	0	0
28	DF	(Croatia) CRO	Slaven Bilić	13	0	13	0	0	0	0	0
32	DF	(England) ENG	Rio Ferdinand	1	0	0+1	0	0	0	0	0
Midfielders
7	MF	(England) ENG	Ian Bishop	41	2	35	1	3	0	3	1
10	MF	(England) ENG	John Moncur	24	2	19+1	0	1	1	3	1
17	MF	(Australia) AUS	Stan Lazaridis	6	0	2+2	0	0+1	0	1	0
18	MF	(Romania) ROU	Ilie Dumitrescu	3	0	2+1	0	0	0	0	0
19	MF	(Australia) AUS	Robbie Slater	26	2	16+6	2	1	0	3	0
20	MF	(England) ENG	Danny Williamson	33	4	28+1	4	3	0	0+1	0
23	MF	(England) ENG	Dale Gordon	2	0	0+2	0	0	0	0	0
24	MF	(Northern Ireland) NIR	Michael Hughes	33	1	28	0	3	1	2	0
26	MF	(England) ENG	Frank Lampard	2	0	0+2	0	0	0	0	0
Forwards
9	FW	(England) ENG	Tony Cottee	39	12	30+3	10	3	0	3	2
11	FW	(Netherlands) NED	Marco Boogers	4	0	0+4	0	0	0	0	0
14	FW	(Northern Ireland) NIR	Iain Dowie	39	9	33	8	3	1	3	0
16	FW	(Portugal) POR	Dani	9	2	3+6	2	0	0	0	0
29	FW	(England) ENG	Mark Watson	1	0	0+1	0	0	0	0	0
Players who left the club permanently or on loan during the season
6	MF	(England) ENG	Martin Allen	3	1	3	1	0	0	0	0
16	MF	(Scotland) SCO	Don Hutchison	12	2	8+4	2	0	0	0	0
25	FW	(Netherlands) NED	Jeroen Boere	1	0	0+1	0	0	0	0	0
25	MF	(United States) USA	John Harkes	13	0	6+6	0	1	0	0	0
