= 1996–97 West Ham United F.C. season =

English football team season

West Ham United
1996–97 season
- Chairman: Terry Brown
- Manager: Harry Redknapp
- Stadium: Upton Park
- FA Premier League: 14th
- FA Cup: Third round
- League Cup: Fourth round
- Top goalscorer: League: Paul Kitson (8); All: Paul Kitson/Julian Dicks (8)
- Highest home attendance: 25,064 (vs. Liverpool, 29 September)
- Lowest home attendance: 19,105 (vs. Aston Villa, 4 December)
- Average home league attendance: 23,242

During the 1996–97 English football season, West Ham United competed in the FA Premier League.

== Season summary ==
The season began with much excitement at Upton Park, as a whole host of foreign signings arrived. However, most of the acquisitions were short-lived and unsuccessful. Romanian striker Florin Răducioiu walked out in mid-season after scoring just two goals and Portuguese winger Paulo Futre played just nine games for the club before giving in to a knee injury and announcing his retirement in November.

It was a season of struggle for Harry Redknapp's team, but in the end, a new wave of players helped to keep West Ham in the FA Premier League on the last day of the season. Exciting young defender Rio Ferdinand broke into the side, while newly signed strikers Paul Kitson and John Hartson gave the attack the boost that Răducioiu and Futre had failed to deliver.

== Final league table ==
Pos	Team	Pld	W	D	L	GF	GA	GD	Pts
12	Derby County	38	11	13	14	45	58	−13	46
13	Blackburn Rovers	38	9	15	14	42	43	−1	42
14	West Ham United	38	10	12	16	39	48	−9	42
15	Everton	38	10	12	16	44	57	−13	42
16	Southampton	38	10	11	17	50	56	−6	41

Source: Premier League
Rules for classification: 1) points; 2) goal difference; 3) number of goals scored.

Results summary

Overall								Home						Away					
Pld	W	D	L	GF	GA	GD	Pts	W	D	L	GF	GA	GD	W	D	L	GF	GA	GD
38	10	12	16	39	48	−9	42	7	6	6	27	25	+2	3	6	10	12	23	−11

Source: Statto

Results by matchday

Match	1	2	3	4	5	6	7	8	9	10	11	12	13	14	15	16	17	18	19	20	21	22	23	24	25	26	27	28	29	30	31	32	33	34	35	36	37	38
Ground	A	H	H	A	A	H	A	H	A	H	H	A	A	H	A	H	H	A	H	H	A	H	H	A	A	H	A	H	A	A	A	H	A	H	A	H	H	A
Result	L	D	W	L	D	L	W	L	L	W	W	L	D	D	D	L	D	L	W	L	D	L	L	L	L	W	L	W	D	D	W	D	L	D	W	W	D	L
Position	16	17	11	15	16	17	13	15	16	13	10	12	12	13	12	15	14	15	16	16	17	18	18	18	18	17	18	17	17	16	15	16	17	18	16	15	12	14

Source: Statto.com
A = Away; H = Home; W = Win; D = Draw; L = Loss

== Results ==
West Ham United's score comes first

=== Legend ===
Win	Draw	Loss

=== FA Premier League ===
Date	Opponent	Venue	Result	Attendance	Scorers
17 August 1996	Arsenal	A	0–2	38,056	
21 August 1996	Coventry City	H	1–1	21,580	Rieper
24 August 1996	Southampton	H	2–1	21,227	M Hughes, Dicks (pen)
4 September 1996	Middlesbrough	A	1–4	30,060	M Hughes
8 September 1996	Sunderland	A	0–0	18,642	
15 September 1996	Wimbledon	H	0–2	21,294	
21 September 1996	Nottingham Forest	A	2–0	23,352	Bowen, M Hughes
29 September 1996	Liverpool	H	1–2	25,064	Bilić
12 October 1996	Everton	A	1–2	36,571	Dicks (pen)
19 October 1996	Leicester City	H	1–0	22,285	Moncur
26 October 1996	Blackburn Rovers	H	2–1	23,947	Berg (own goal), Porfírio
2 November 1996	Tottenham Hotspur	A	0–1	32,999	
16 November 1996	Newcastle United	A	1–1	36,552	Rowland
23 November 1996	Derby County	H	1–1	24,576	Bishop
30 November 1996	Sheffield Wednesday	A	0–0	22,321	
4 December 1996	Aston Villa	H	0–2	19,105	
8 December 1996	Manchester United	H	2–2	25,045	Răducioiu, Dicks (pen)
21 December 1996	Chelsea	A	1–3	28,315	Porfírio
28 December 1996	Sunderland	H	2–0	24,077	Bilić, Răducioiu
1 January 1997	Nottingham Forest	H	0–1	22,358	
11 January 1997	Liverpool	A	0–0	40,102	
20 January 1997	Leeds United	H	0–2	19,441	
29 January 1997	Arsenal	H	1–2	24,382	Rose (own goal)
1 February 1997	Blackburn Rovers	A	1–2	21,994	Ferdinand
15 February 1997	Derby County	A	0–1	18,057	
24 February 1997	Tottenham Hotspur	H	4–3	23,998	Dicks (2, 1 pen), Kitson, Hartson
1 March 1997	Leeds United	A	0–1	30,575	
12 March 1997	Chelsea	H	3–2	24,502	Dicks, Kitson (2)
15 March 1997	Aston Villa	A	0–0	35,992	
18 March 1997	Wimbledon	A	1–1	15,771	Lazaridis
22 March 1997	Coventry City	A	3–1	22,291	Hartson (2), Ferdinand
9 April 1997	Middlesbrough	H	0–0	23,988	
12 April 1997	Southampton	A	0–2	15,244	
19 April 1997	Everton	H	2–2	24,525	Kitson (2)
23 April 1997	Leicester City	A	1–0	20,327	Moncur
3 May 1997	Sheffield Wednesday	H	5–1	24,960	Kitson (3), Hartson (2)
6 May 1997	Newcastle United	H	0–0	24,617	
11 May 1997	Manchester United	A	0–2	55,249	

=== FA Cup ===
Round	Date	Opponent	Venue	Result	Attendance	Goalscorers
R3	4 January 1997	Wrexham	A	1–1	9,747	Porfírio
R3R	25 January 1997	Wrexham	H	0–1	16,763	

=== League Cup ===
Round	Date	Opponent	Venue	Result	Attendance	Goalscorers
R2 1st Leg	18 September 1996	Barnet	A	1–1	3,849	Cottee
R2 2nd Leg	25 September 1996	Barnet	H	1–0	15,264	Bilić
R3	23 October 1996	Nottingham Forest	H	4–1	19,402	Dowie (2), Porfírio, Dicks (pen)
R4	27 November 1996	Stockport County	H	1–1	20,061	Răducioiu
R4R	18 December 1996	Stockport County	A	1–2	9,834	Dicks

== First-team squad ==
Note: Flags indicate national team as defined under FIFA eligibility rules; some limited exceptions apply. Players may hold more than one non-FIFA nationality.

No.	Pos.	Nation	Player
1	GK	(Czech Republic) CZE	Luděk Mikloško
2	DF	(England) ENG	Tim Breacker
3	DF	(England) ENG	Julian Dicks (captain)
4	DF	(England) ENG	Steve Potts (vice-captain)
5	DF	(England) ENG	Richard Hall
6	MF	(England) ENG	Danny Williamson
7	MF	(England) ENG	Ian Bishop
8	DF	(Denmark) DEN	Marc Rieper
9	FW	(England) ENG	Paul Kitson
10	FW	(Wales) WAL	John Hartson
11	MF	(Northern Ireland) NIR	Steve Lomas
12	DF	(Northern Ireland) NIR	Keith Rowland
13	MF	(Portugal) POR	Hugo Porfírio (on loan from Sporting CP)

No.	Pos.	Nation	Player
14	FW	(Northern Ireland) NIR	Iain Dowie
16	MF	(England) ENG	John Moncur
17	MF	(Australia) AUS	Stan Lazaridis
21	GK	(England) ENG	Les Sealey
24	MF	(Northern Ireland) NIR	Michael Hughes
25	MF	(England) ENG	Lee Hodges
26	MF	(England) ENG	Frank Lampard
27	DF	(England) ENG	Rio Ferdinand
28	DF	(Croatia) CRO	Slaven Bilić
29	FW	(Nigeria) NGA	Emmanuel Omoyinmi
31	GK	(England) ENG	Neil Finn
32	MF	(England) ENG	Scott Mean
33	FW	(Republic of Ireland) IRL	Lee Boylan

=== Left club during season ===
Note: Flags indicate national team as defined under FIFA eligibility rules; some limited exceptions apply. Players may hold more than one non-FIFA nationality.

No.	Pos.	Nation	Player
9	FW	(England) ENG	Tony Cottee (to Selangor)
10	FW	(Portugal) POR	Paulo Futre (to Atlético Madrid)
11	FW	(Romania) ROU	Florin Răducioiu (to Espanyol)
15	DF	(England) ENG	Kenny Brown (to Birmingham City)
18	FW	(Romania) ROU	Ilie Dumitrescu (to América)
19	MF	(Australia) AUS	Robbie Slater (to Southampton)

No.	Pos.	Nation	Player
19	FW	(England) ENG	Mike Newell (on loan from Birmingham City)
20	DF	(Wales) WAL	Mark Bowen (to Shimizu S-Pulse)
21	GK	(England) ENG	Peter Shilton (to Leyton Orient)
22	DF	(England) ENG	Adrian Whitbread (to Portsmouth)
23	FW	(England) ENG	Steve Jones (to Charlton Athletic)
30	GK	(Australia) AUS	Steve Mautone (to Reading)

== Statistics ==
=== Appearances and goals ===
No.	Pos	Nat	Player	Total		FA Premier League		FA Cup		League Cup	
No.	Pos	Nat	Player	Apps	Goals	Apps	Goals	Apps	Goals	Apps	Goals
Goalkeepers
1	GK	(Czech Republic) CZE	Luděk Mikloško	41	0	36	0	2	0	3	0
21	GK	(England) ENG	Les Sealey	2	0	1+1	0	0	0	0	0
Defenders
2	DF	(England) ENG	Tim Breacker	30	0	22+3	0	2	0	3	0
3	DF	(England) ENG	Julian Dicks	38	8	31	6	2	0	5	2
4	DF	(England) ENG	Steve Potts	21	0	17+2	0	1	0	1	0
5	DF	(England) ENG	Richard Hall	7	0	7	0	0	0	0	0
8	DF	(Denmark) DEN	Marc Rieper	33	1	26+2	1	1	0	4	0
12	DF	(Northern Ireland) NIR	Keith Rowland	14	1	11+3	1	0	0	0	0
27	DF	(England) ENG	Rio Ferdinand	17	2	11+4	2	1	0	0+1	0
28	DF	(Croatia) CRO	Slaven Bilić	41	3	35	2	1	0	5	1
Midfielders
6	MF	(England) ENG	Danny Williamson	18	0	13+2	0	2	0	0+1	0
7	MF	(England) ENG	Ian Bishop	36	1	26+3	1	2	0	5	0
11	MF	(Northern Ireland) NIR	Steve Lomas	7	0	7	0	0	0	0	0
13	MF	(Portugal) POR	Hugo Porfirio	27	4	15+8	2	1+1	1	2	1
16	MF	(England) ENG	John Moncur	32	2	26+1	2	1	0	4	0
17	MF	(Australia) AUS	Stan Lazaridis	27	1	13+9	1	1	0	3+1	0
24	MF	(Northern Ireland) NIR	Michael Hughes	39	3	31+2	3	2	0	4	0
26	MF	(England) ENG	Frank Lampard	16	0	3+10	0	1	0	1+1	0
Forwards
9	FW	(England) ENG	Paul Kitson	14	8	14	8	0	0	0	0
10	FW	(Wales) WAL	John Hartson	11	5	11	5	0	0	0	0
14	FW	(Northern Ireland) NIR	Iain Dowie	28	2	18+5	0	0	0	5	2
29	FW	(Nigeria) NGA	Emmanuel Omoyinmi	1	0	0+1	0	0	0	0	0
33	FW	(Republic of Ireland) IRL	Lee Boylan	1	0	0+1	0	0	0	0	0
Players who left the club permanently or on loan during the season
9	FW	(England) ENG	Tony Cottee	5	1	2+1	0	0	0	2	1
10	FW	(Portugal) POR	Paulo Futre	9	0	4+5	0	0	0	0	0
11	FW	(Romania) ROU	Florin Răducioiu	12	3	6+5	2	0	0	1	1
18	MF	(Romania) ROU	Ilie Dumitrescu	10	0	3+4	0	0	0	2+1	0
19	MF	(Australia) AUS	Robbie Slater	3	0	2+1	0	0	0	0	0
19	FW	(England) ENG	Mike Newell	7	0	6+1	0	0	0	0	0
20	DF	(England) ENG	Mark Bowen	20	1	15+2	1	0	0	3	0
23	FW	(England) ENG	Steve Jones	11	0	5+3	0	2	0	0+1	0
30	GK	(Australia) AUS	Steve Mautone	3	0	1	0	0	0	2	0
