= 1999–2000 West Ham United F.C. season =

English football team season

West Ham United F.C.
1999–2000 season
- Chairman: Terry Brown
- Manager: Harry Redknapp
- Stadium: Upton Park
- FA Premier League: 9th
- FA Cup: Third round
- League Cup: Quarter-final
- UEFA Intertoto Cup: Winners
- UEFA Cup: Second round
- Top goalscorer: League: Paolo Di Canio (16); All: Paolo Di Canio (17)
- Highest home attendance: 26,044 (vs. Leeds United, 14 May)
- Lowest home attendance: 7,485 (vs. Heerenveen, 28 July)
- Average home league attendance: 25,093
Home colours	Away colours	Third colours

During the 1999–2000 season, West Ham United competed in the FA Premier League.

== Season summary ==
West Ham's involvement in the Intertoto Cup meant that they would have their shortest close-season in history. Only 62 days had passed since the last game of the previous season before West Ham took to the field against Jokerit of Finland.

West Ham had already played four games before the FA Premier League season began, and this match-fitness head-start on the rest of the division would see them in third place after five games.

Although they lost in the first leg of the Intertoto Cup Final 1–0 at home to Metz, West Ham managed to win the return leg 3–1 two weeks later and ensure UEFA Cup football.

Harry Redknapp regarded this result as his greatest night as West Ham's manager: "That was a great performance and a great day for West Ham, to win the Intertoto Cup and to be in the UEFA Cup and turning in such an outstanding performance against a good French team, to go over there and play so well and win 3–1. We took great support over to France and they enjoyed their day. Yeah, I think that was special. That was a real good day for me and West Ham's history."

Frank Lampard was West Ham's top European goalscorer with four in ten games. He was ever-present in West Ham's European campaign, along with Trevor Sinclair, Paolo Di Canio and captain Steve Lomas.

After making only one substitute appearance in West Ham's first Intertoto Cup game, Ian Wright was loaned to Nottingham Forest. Later in the season he signed a permanent deal at Celtic.

On 15 December 1999, West Ham played a League Cup quarter-final game against Aston Villa. The game went to extra time and a reserve player, Emmanuel Omoyinmi, was brought on as a substitute for Paulo Wanchope in the 113th minute. Unknown to Redknapp, Omoyinmi had previously played in the competition for Gillingham, where he had spent time on loan earlier in the season, and was thus ineligible to play. Although the Hammers won the game on penalties, the game was replayed after the Football League upheld a complaint by Villa. West Ham lost the replay 3–1. The error eventually led to the resignations of the club secretary Graham Mackrell and the football secretary Alison Dowd: "Whatever happens, I'm responsible for administration here at West Ham United. The buck does stop with me," said Mackrell.

26 March 2000 saw West Ham meet Wimbledon. The Hammers had only beaten the Dons at home twice in the previous ten meetings between the clubs. The 9th minute of the game saw Di Canio score what would become the BBC's "Goal of the Season" with an airborne volley. Frédéric Kanouté doubled West Ham's lead in the 59th minute, before Wimbledon pulled one back after 75 minutes with a 25-yard volley from former Hammer Michael Hughes.

West Ham's heaviest defeat of the season came on 1 April when they were demolished by table-toppers and eventual champions Manchester United. Wanchope opened the scoring in the 11th minute but Manchester United proceeded to score seven, including a Paul Scholes hat-trick.

This sparked West Ham into a run of three straight wins, culminating with their biggest win of the season on 22 April, when they beat Coventry City 5–0. Di Canio scored in the 48th and 67th minutes, with the other goals coming from Michael Carrick, Javier Margas and Kanouté.

The Boleyn Ground saw its largest attendance of the season (26,044) on the last day against Leeds United. The game ended 0–0, and West Ham finished 9th in the Premier League, putting them in the top nine for the third consecutive season. Redknapp said after the Leeds game: "It's been a good season again. People don't realise that West Ham have only finished in the top ten 14 times in its entire history and this is only the second time that we've done it three years running."

Di Canio was the season's leading scorer with 17 goals in all competitions. Sinclair made the most appearances with 49 in all competitions.

== Final league table ==
Pos	Team	Pld	W	D	L	GF	GA	GD	Pts	Qualification or relegation
7	Sunderland	38	16	10	12	57	56	+1	58	
8	Leicester City	38	16	7	15	55	55	0	55	Qualification for the UEFA Cup first round (Note: Leicester City qualified for the UEFA Cup as League Cup winners.)
9	West Ham United	38	15	10	13	52	53	−1	55	
10	Tottenham Hotspur	38	15	8	15	57	49	+8	53	
11	Newcastle United	38	14	10	14	63	54	+9	52	

Source: Premier League
Rules for classification: 1) points; 2) goal difference; 3) number of goals scored.
Notes:

Results summary

Overall								Home						Away					
Pld	W	D	L	GF	GA	GD	Pts	W	D	L	GF	GA	GD	W	D	L	GF	GA	GD
38	15	10	13	52	53	−1	55	11	5	3	32	23	+9	4	5	10	20	30	−10

Source: 1999–2000 FA Premier League table

== Results ==
West Ham United's score comes first

=== Legend ===
Win	Draw	Loss

=== FA Premier League ===
Date	Opponent	Venue	Result	Attendance	Scorers
7 August 1999	Tottenham Hotspur	H	1–0	26,010	Lampard
16 August 1999	Aston Villa	A	2–2	26,250	Southgate (own goal), Sinclair
21 August 1999	Leicester City	H	2–1	23,631	Wanchope, Di Canio
28 August 1999	Bradford City	A	3–0	17,926	Di Canio, Sinclair, Wanchope
11 September 1999	Watford	H	1–0	25,310	Di Canio
19 September 1999	Everton	A	0–1	35,154	
25 September 1999	Coventry City	A	0–1	19,993	
3 October 1999	Arsenal	H	2–1	26,009	Di Canio (2)
17 October 1999	Middlesbrough	A	0–2	31,862	
24 October 1999	Sunderland	H	1–1	26,022	Sinclair
27 October 1999	Liverpool	A	0–1	44,012	
30 October 1999	Leeds United	A	0–1	40,190	
7 November 1999	Chelsea	A	0–0	34,935	
21 November 1999	Sheffield Wednesday	H	4–3	23,015	Wanchope, Di Canio (pen), Foé, Lampard
27 November 1999	Liverpool	H	1–0	26,043	Sinclair
6 December 1999	Tottenham Hotspur	A	0–0	36,233	
18 December 1999	Manchester United	H	2–4	26,037	Di Canio (2)
26 December 1999	Wimbledon	A	2–2	21,180	Sinclair, Lampard
28 December 1999	Derby County	H	1–1	24,998	Di Canio
3 January 2000	Newcastle United	A	2–2	36,314	Lampard, Štimac
15 January 2000	Aston Villa	H	1–1	24,237	Di Canio
22 January 2000	Leicester City	A	3–1	19,019	Wanchope (2), Di Canio
5 February 2000	Southampton	A	1–2	15,257	Lampard
12 February 2000	Bradford City	H	5–4	25,417	Sinclair, Moncur, Di Canio (pen), Cole, Lampard
26 February 2000	Everton	H	0–4	26,025	
4 March 2000	Watford	A	2–1	18,619	Lomas, Wanchope
8 March 2000	Southampton	H	2–0	23,484	Wanchope, Sinclair
11 March 2000	Sheffield Wednesday	A	1–3	21,147	Lampard
18 March 2000	Chelsea	H	0–0	26,041	
26 March 2000	Wimbledon	H	2–1	20,050	Di Canio, Kanouté
1 April 2000	Manchester United	A	1–7	61,611	Wanchope
12 April 2000	Newcastle United	H	2–1	25,817	Wanchope (2)
15 April 2000	Derby County	A	2–1	31,202	Wanchope (2)
22 April 2000	Coventry City	H	5–0	24,719	Carrick, Margas, Di Canio (2), Kanouté
29 April 2000	Middlesbrough	H	0–1	25,472	
2 May 2000	Arsenal	A	1–2	38,093	Di Canio
6 May 2000	Sunderland	A	0–1	41,684	
14 May 2000	Leeds United	H	0–0	26,044	

=== FA Cup ===
Round	Date	Opponent	Venue	Result	Attendance	Goalscorers
R3	11 December 1999	Tranmere Rovers	A	0–1	13,629	

=== League Cup ===
Round	Date	Opponent	Venue	Result	Attendance	Goalscorers
R3	13 October 1999	AFC Bournemouth	H	2–0	22,067	Keller, Lampard
R4	30 November 1999	Birmingham City	A	3–2	17,728	Lomas, Kitson, Cole
R5	11 January 2000	Aston Villa	H	1–3 (a.e.t.)	25,592	Lampard

NOTE: This match was a replay after West Ham were ordered to replay the match after fielding an ineligible player in the original tie

=== Intertoto Cup ===
Round	Date	Opponent	Venue	Result	Attendance	Goalscorers	Referee
R3 1st leg	17 July 1999	Jokerit	H	1–0	11,098	Kitson	Miroslav Liba (Czech Republic)
R3 2nd leg	24 July 1999	Jokerit	A	1–1 (won 2–1 on agg)	7,667	Lampard	Valentin Ivanov (Russia)
SF 1st leg	28 July 1999	Heerenveen	H	1–0	7,485	Lampard	Edgar Steinborn (Germany)
SF 2nd leg	4 August 1999	Heerenveen	A	1–0 (won 2–0 on agg)	13,500	Wanchope	Pascal Garibian (France)
F 1st leg	10 August 1999	Metz	H	0–1	25,372		Manuel Díaz Vega (Spain)
F 2nd leg	24 August 1999	Metz	A	3–1 (won 3–2 on agg)	19,599	Sinclair, Lampard, Wanchope	Hellmut Krug (Germany)

=== UEFA Cup ===
Round	Date	Opponent	Venue	Result	Attendance	Goalscorers	Referee
R1 1st leg	16 September 1999	Osijek	H	3–0	25,331	Wanchope, Di Canio, Lampard	Paulo Paraty (Portugal)
R1 2nd leg	30 September 1999	Osijek	A	3–1 (won 6–1 on agg)	15,000	Kitson, Ruddock, Foé	Jack van Hulten (Netherlands)
R2 1st leg	21 October 1999	Steaua București	A	0–2	12,550		Claus Bo Larsen (Denmark)
R2 2nd leg	4 November 1999	Steaua București	H	0–0 (lost 0–2 on agg)	24,514		Lubomír Puček (Czech Republic)

== First-team squad ==
Squad at end of season

Note: Flags indicate national team as defined under FIFA eligibility rules; some limited exceptions apply. Players may hold more than one non-FIFA nationality.

No.	Pos.	Nation	Player
1	GK	TRI	Shaka Hislop
2	DF	ENG	Gary Charles
3	DF	ENG	Stuart Pearce
4	DF	ENG	Steve Potts
5	DF	CRO	Igor Štimac
6	DF	ENG	Neil Ruddock
7	MF	FRA	Marc Keller
8	MF	ENG	Trevor Sinclair
9	FW	ENG	Paul Kitson
10	FW	ITA	Paolo Di Canio
11	MF	NIR	Steve Lomas
12	FW	CRC	Paulo Wanchope
13	MF	CMR	Marc-Vivien Foé
14	FW	FRA	Frédéric Kanouté (on loan from Lyon)

No.	Pos.	Nation	Player
15	DF	ENG	Rio Ferdinand
16	MF	ENG	John Moncur
18	MF	ENG	Frank Lampard
19	DF	ENG	Ian Pearce
20	DF	ENG	Scott Minto
21	MF	ENG	Michael Carrick
22	GK	CAN	Craig Forrest
26	MF	ENG	Joe Cole
29	GK	USA	Ian Feuer
30	DF	CHI	Javier Margas
32	GK	ENG	Stephen Bywater
35	DF	IRL	Shaun Byrne
38	DF	ENG	Adam Newton

=== Left club during season ===
Note: Flags indicate national team as defined under FIFA eligibility rules; some limited exceptions apply. Players may hold more than one non-FIFA nationality.

No.	Pos.	Nation	Player
2	DF	ENG	Rob Jones (retired)
14	FW	ENG	Ian Wright (to Celtic)

No.	Pos.	Nation	Player
23	DF	AUS	Chris Coyne (to Dundee)
28	GK	YUG	Saša Ilić (on loan from Charlton Athletic)

=== Reserve squad ===
The following players did not make a first-team appearance this season.

Note: Flags indicate national team as defined under FIFA eligibility rules; some limited exceptions apply. Players may hold more than one non-FIFA nationality.

No.	Pos.	Nation	Player
17	MF	ENG	Leon Britton
24	FW	FRA	Samassi Abou
25	DF	ENG	Stevland Angus
27	FW	NGA	Emmanuel Omoyinmi
28	GK	ENG	Les Sealey
31	FW	TUR	Omer Riza
33	MF	ENG	Craig Etherington
34	FW	ENG	Gary Alexander
36	DF	ENG	Terrell Forbes
37	MF	NIR	Grant McCann
39	DF	ENG	Stephen Purches
40	MF	ENG	Jimmy Bullard
41	GK	IRL	Alex O'Reilly
42	FW	ENG	Jermain Defoe

No.	Pos.	Nation	Player
43	MF	AUS	Richard Garcia
44	FW	ENG	Gavin Holligan
45	DF	ENG	Ezomo Iriekpen
—	DF	CMR	Romarin Billong
—	DF	AUS	Steve Laurie
—	MF	AUS	Michael Ferrante
—	MF	FIN	Daniel Sjölund
—	FW	ENG	Amos Foyewa
—	FW	UGA	Moses Junju

== Statistics ==
No.		Player	Position	Euro apps	Euro gls	Lge apps	Lge gls	FAC apps	FAC gls	LC apps	LC gls	Date signed	Previous club
1999 UEFA Intertoto Cup second leg winning team
1	(Trinidad and Tobago)	Shaka Hislop	GK	9		22		1		3		July 1998	Newcastle United
8	(England)	Trevor Sinclair	RWB	10	1	36	7	1		2+1		January 1998	Queens Park Rangers
4	(England)	Steve Potts	CB	7+1		16+1		1		1		May 1984	Academy
11	(Northern Ireland)	Steve Lomas (captain)	CB	10		25	1	1		2	1	March 1997	Manchester City
15	(England)	Rio Ferdinand	CB	9		33		1		3		November 1995	Academy
7	(France)	Marc Keller	LWB	6+1		19+4				2+1	1	July 1998	Karlsruher SC
13	(Cameroon)	Marc-Vivien Foé	CM	5+1	1	25	1	1		3		January 1999	Lens
16	(England)	John Moncur	CM	5+1		20+2	1					June 1994	Swindon Town
18	(England)	Frank Lampard	CM	10	4	34	7	1		3	2	July 1995	Academy
10	(Italy)	Paolo Di Canio (Hammer of the Year)	CF	10	1	29+1	16	1		3		January 1999	Sheffield Wednesday
12	(Costa Rica)	Paulo Wanchope	CF	7+1	3	33+2	12	0+1		2		July 1999	Derby County
Substitute
26	(England)	Joe Cole	M	2+3		17+5	1	1		2+1	1	July 1997	Academy
Other players
5	(Croatia)	Igor Štimac	CB	2		24	1			2		August 1999	Derby County
20	(England)	Scott Minto	LWB	5		15+3		1		1		January 1999	Benfica
6	(England)	Neil Ruddock	CB	5	1	12+3		1		2+1		July 1998	Liverpool
30	(Chile)	Javier Margas	CB	2+1		15+3	1			1		July 1998	Universidad Católica
22	(Canada)	Craig Forrest	GK	1		9+2						July 1995	Ipswich Town
9	(England)	Paul Kitson	CF	3+5	2	4+6		0+1		0+2	1	February 1997	Newcastle United
Other players
14	(Mali)	Frédéric Kanouté	F			8	2					May 2000	Lyon
3	(England)	Stuart Pearce	CB			8						July 1999	Newcastle United
21	(England)	Michael Carrick	CM	0+1		4+4	1					July 1998	Academy
32	(England)	Stephen Bywater	GK			3+1						20 February 1998	Rochdale
29	(United States)	Ian Feuer	GK			3						February 2000	Cardiff City
2	(England)	Gary Charles	RB			2+2				1		October 1999	Benfica
2	(England)	Rob Jones	RB	1								July 1999	Liverpool
28	(Serbia and Montenegro)	Saša Ilić	GK			1						February 2000	Charlton Athletic
19	(England)	Ian Pearce	CB	1+1		1						September 1997	Blackburn Rovers
38	(England)	Adam Newton	CD	0+1		0+2						December 1997	Academy
17	(Australia)	Stan Lazaridis	LW	0+1								September 1995	West Adelaide
14	(England)	Ian Wright	CF	0+1								August 1998	Arsenal
35	(Republic of Ireland)	Shaun Byrne	LWB			0+1						July 1998	Academy

== Transfers ==
Signings for the 1999–2000 season included full-backs Gary Charles, for £1.2 million from Benfica, and 37-year-old former England International Stuart Pearce, who signed from Newcastle United on a free transfer. Also arriving was Croatian Igor Štimac, for £600,000, who followed his Derby County teammate Paulo Wanchope to Upton Park. West Ham had already spent £3.5 million the previous month to bring in the lanky Costa Rican.

All of these transfers had been funded by the £5.75 million sale of Eyal Berkovic to Celtic, and Stan Lazaridis' £1.9 million departure to Birmingham City. West Ham had only spent £300,000 for Lazaridis four years earlier.

Harry Redknapp had tried to bring Slaven Bilić back from Everton but the player failed a medical.

=== In ===
- (England) Gary Charles – (Portugal) Benfica, £1,200,000
- (England) Stuart Pearce – (England) Newcastle United, free
- (Croatia) Igor Štimac – (England) Derby County, £600,000
- (Costa Rica) Paulo Wanchope – (England) Derby County, £3,500,000

=== Out ===
- (Israel) Eyal Berkovic – (Scotland) Celtic, £5,750,000
- (Australia) Stan Lazaridis – (England) Birmingham City, £1,900,000
