= 1998–99 West Ham United F.C. season =

English football team season

West Ham United F.C.
1998–99 season
- Chairman: Terry Brown
- Manager: Harry Redknapp
- Stadium: Upton Park
- FA Premier League: 5th
- FA Cup: Third round
- League Cup: Second round
- Top goalscorer: Ian Wright (9)
- Highest home attendance: 26,044 (vs. Tottenham Hotspur, 28 November)
- Lowest home attendance: 23,153 (vs. Southampton, 28 September)
- Average home league attendance: 25,639

During the 1998–99 English football season, West Ham United F.C. competed in the FA Premier League.

== Season summary ==
In the 1998–99 season, the Hammers finished fifth in the FA Premier League, their second-best placing ever in the top-flight, securing UEFA Cup qualification to mark a return to European competitions after 19 years away.

New additions to the side for the season were goalkeeper Shaka Hislop, defender Neil Ruddock, Marc Keller and Arsenal goalscoring legend Ian Wright, while mid-season arrivals came in the shape of midfielder Marc-Vivien Foé, defender Scott Minto and striker Paolo Di Canio. During the course of the season, several key players left the club, including veteran defender Tim Breacker, unsettled striker John Hartson and winger Andy Impey. April saw the retirement of defender Richard Hall, who had struggled with injuries since his arrival from Southampton in July 1996.

The season also saw the emergence of highly promising midfielder Joe Cole, who played his first eight league games and made a further appearance in the FA Cup.

== Final league table ==
Pos	Team	Pld	W	D	L	GF	GA	GD	Pts	Qualification or relegation
3	Chelsea	38	20	15	3	57	30	+27	75	Qualification for the Champions League third qualifying round
4	Leeds United	38	18	13	7	62	34	+28	67	Qualification for the UEFA Cup first round
5	West Ham United	38	16	9	13	46	53	−7	57	Qualification for the Intertoto Cup third round
6	Aston Villa	38	15	10	13	51	46	+5	55	
7	Liverpool	38	15	9	14	68	49	+19	54	

Source: Premier League
Rules for classification: 1) points; 2) goal difference; 3) number of goals scored.

Results summary

Overall								Home						Away					
Pld	W	D	L	GF	GA	GD	Pts	W	D	L	GF	GA	GD	W	D	L	GF	GA	GD
38	16	9	13	46	53	−7	57	11	3	5	32	26	+6	5	6	8	14	27	−13

Source: 1998-99 FA Premier League table

== Results ==
West Ham United's score comes first

=== Legend ===
Win	Draw	Loss

=== FA Premier League ===
15 August 1998 1	Sheffield Wednesday	0–1	West Ham United	Sheffield
BST			Wright	Stadium: Hillsborough; Attendance: 30,236

22 August 1998 2	West Ham United	0–0	Manchester United	Upton Park (East London)
BST				Stadium: Boleyn Ground; Attendance: 26,039

29 August 1998 3	Coventry City	0–0	West Ham United	Coventry
BST				Stadium: Highfield; Attendance: 20,818

9 September 1998 4	West Ham United	3–4	Wimbledon	Upton Park (East London)
BST	Hartson; Wright,		Goal	Stadium: Boleyn Ground; Attendance: 25,311

12 September 1998 5	West Ham United	2–1	Liverpool	Upton Park (East London)
	Hartson; Berkovic		Goal	Stadium: Boleyn Ground; Attendance: 26,029

19 September 1998 6	Nottingham Forest	0–0	West Ham United	West Bridgford
BST				Stadium: City Ground; Attendance: 26,463

28 September 1998 7	West Ham United	1–0	Southampton	Upton Park (East London)
BST	Wright			Stadium: Boleyn Ground; Attendance: 23,153

3 October 1998 8	Blackburn Rovers	3–0	West Ham United	Blackburn
	Goal			Stadium: Ewood Park; Attendance: 25,213

17 October 1998 9	West Ham United	0–0	Aston Villa	Upton Park (East London)
				Stadium: Boleyn Ground; Attendance: 26,002

24 October 1998 10	Charlton Athletic	4–2	West Ham United	Charlton
			0' (o.g.) Rufus; Berkovic	Stadium: The Valley; Attendance: 20,043

31 October 1998 11	Newcastle United	0–3	West Ham United	Newcastle-upon-Tyne
			, Wright; Sinclair	Stadium: St. James' Park; Attendance: 36,744

8 November 1998 12	West Ham United	1–1	Chelsea	Upton Park (East London)
	Ruddock		Goal	Stadium: Boleyn Ground; Attendance: 26,023

14 November 1998 13	West Ham United	3–2	Leicester City	Upton Park (East London)
	Kitson; Lomas; Lampard		Goal	Stadium: Boleyn Ground; Attendance: 25,642

22 November 1998 14	Derby County	0–2	West Ham United	Derby
			Hartson; Keller	Stadium: Baseball Ground; Attendance: 31,366

28 November 1998 15	West Ham United	2–1	Tottenham Hotspur	Upton Park (East London)
	Sinclair,		Goal	Stadium: Boleyn Ground; Attendance: 26,044

5 December 1998 16	Leeds United	4–0	West Ham United	Leeds
	Goal			Stadium: Elland Road; Attendance: 36,320

12 December 1998 17	Middlesbrough	1–0	West Ham United	Middlesbrough
	Goal			Stadium: Riverside; Attendance: 34,623

19 December 1998 18	West Ham United	2–1	Everton	Upton Park (East London)
	Keller; Sinclair goals2=			Stadium: Boleyn Ground; Attendance: 25,998

26 December 1998 19	Arsenal	1–0	West Ham United	Islington (London)
	Goal			Stadium: Highbury; Attendance: 38,098

28 December 1998 20	West Ham United	2–0	Coventry City	Upton Park (East London)
				Stadium: Boleyn Ground; Attendance: 25,662

10 January 1999 21	Manchester United	4–1	West Ham United	Greater Manchester
	Goal		Lampard	Stadium: Old Trafford; Attendance: 55,180

16 January 1999 22	West Ham United	0–4	Sheffield Wednesday	Upton Park (East London)
			Goal	Stadium: Boleyn Ground; Attendance: 25,642

30 January 1999 23	Wimbledon	0–0	West Ham United	Croydon (South London)
				Stadium: Selhurst Park; Attendance: 23,035

6 February 1999 24	West Ham United	0–4	Arsenal	Upton Park (East London)
			Goal	Stadium: Boleyn Ground; Attendance: 26,042

13 February 1999 25	West Ham United	2–1	Nottingham Forest	Upton Park (East London)
	Pearce; Lampard		Goal	Stadium: Boleyn Ground; Attendance: 25,458

20 February 1999 26	Liverpool	2–2	West Ham United	Liverpool
	Goal		0' (pen.) Lampard; Keller	Stadium: Anfield Road; Attendance: 44,511

27 February 1999 27	West Ham United	2–0	Blackburn Rovers	Upton Park (East London)
	Pearce; Di Canio			Stadium: Boleyn Ground; Attendance: 25,529

6 March 1999 28	Southampton	1–0	West Ham United	Southampton
				Stadium: The Dell; Attendance: 15,240

13 March 1999 29	Chelsea	0–1	West Ham United	Fulham (West London)
			Kitson	Stadium: Stamford Bridge; Attendance: 34,765

20 March 1999 30	West Ham United	2–0	Newcastle United	Upton Park (East London)
	Di Canio; Kitson			Stadium: Boleyn Ground; Attendance: 25,997

2 April 1999 31	Aston Villa	0–0	West Ham United	Birmingham
				Stadium: Villa Park; Attendance: 36,813

5 April 1999 32	West Ham United	0–1	Charlton Athletic	Upton Park (East London)
	Goal			Stadium: Boleyn Ground; Attendance: 26,041

10 April 1999 33	Leicester City	0–0	West Ham United	Leicester
				Stadium: Filbert Street; Attendance: 20,402

17 April 1999 34	West Ham United	5–1	Derby County	Upton Park (East London)
	Di Canio; Berkovic; Wright; Ruddock; Sinclair		Goal	Stadium: Boleyn Ground; Attendance: 25,485

24 April 1999 35	Tottenham Hotspur	1–2	West Ham United	Tottenham (North London)
	Goal		Wright; Keller	Stadium: White Hart Lane; Attendance: 36,089

1 May 1999 36	West Ham United	1–5	Leeds United	Upton Park (East London)
	Di Canio		Goal	Stadium: Boleyn Ground; Attendance: 25,997

8 May 1999 37	Everton	6–0	West Ham United	Walton
	Goal			Stadium: Goodison Park; Attendance: 40,049

16 May 1999 38	West Ham United	4–0	Middlesbrough	Upton Park (East London)
	Lampard; Keller; Sinclair; Di Canio			Stadium: Boleyn Ground; Attendance: 25,902

=== FA Cup ===
Round	Date	Opponent	Venue	Result	Attendance	Goalscorers
R3	2 January 1999	Swansea City	H	1–1	26,039	Dicks
R3R	13 January 1999	Swansea City	A	0–1	10,116	

=== League Cup ===
Round	Date	Opponent	Venue	Result	Attendance	Goalscorers
R2 1st Leg	15 September 1998	Northampton Town	A	0–2	7,254	
R2 2nd Leg	22 September 1998	Northampton Town	H	1–0 (1–2 on agg)	25,435	Lampard

== Squad ==
No.		Player	Position	Lge apps	Lge Gls	FAC apps	FAC Gls	LC apps	LC Gls	Date signed	Previous club
West Ham United XI 1998–1999
12	(Trinidad and Tobago)	Shaka Hislop (Hammer of the Year)	GK	37	0	2	0	2	0	July 1998	Newcastle United
15	(England)	Rio Ferdinand	CB	31	0	1	0	1	0	November 1995	Academy
19	(England)	Ian Pearce	CB	33	0	1	0	2	0	September 1997	Blackburn Rovers
6	(England)	Neil Ruddock	CB	27	0	2	0	1	0	July 1998	Liverpool
8	(England)	Trevor Sinclair	RM	36	7	2		2		January 1998	Queens Park Rangers
11	(Northern Ireland)	Steve Lomas (captain)	CM	30		2				March 1997	Manchester City
18	(England)	Frank Lampard	CM	38	5	1	1	2		July 1995	Academy
7	(France)	Marc Keller	LM	17+4	5	0	0	1	0	July 1998	Karlsruher SC
29	(Israel)	Eyal Berkovic	AM	28+2	3	1+1		1		June 1997	Southampton
10	(Wales)	John Hartson	CF	16+1	4	2		1		February 1997	Arsenal
14	(England)	Ian Wright	CF	20+2	9	1		2		August 1998	Arsenal
Important players
10	(Italy)	Paolo Di Canio	CF	12+1	4					January 1999	Sheffield Wednesday
20	(England)	Scott Minto	LWB	14+1						January 1999	Benfica
9	(England)	Paul Kitson	CF	13+4	3					February 1997	Newcastle United
13	(Cameroon)	Marc-Vivien Foé	CM	13						January 1999	Lens
4	(England)	Steve Potts	CB	11+8		1		2		May 1984	Academy
17	(Australia)	Stan Lazaridis	LWB	11+4		2		1		September 1995	West Adelaide
3	(England)	Julian Dicks	D	9		2		1	1	October 1994	Liverpool
16	(England)	John Moncur	CM	6+8				1		June 1994	Swindon Town
Other players
20	(England)	Andy Impey	RWB	6+2				1		September 1997	Queens Park Rangers
30	(Chile)	Javier Margas	CB	3						July 1998	Universidad Católica
26	(England)	Joe Cole	M	2+6		0+1				July 1997	Academy
2	(England)	Tim Breacker	RB	2+1		1		0+1		October 1990	Luton Town
24	(France)	Samassi Abou	CF	2+1		0+1		1		October 1997	Cannes
22	(Canada)	Craig Forrest	GK	1+1						July 1995	Ipswich Town
27	(Nigeria)	Emmanuel Omoyinmi	F	0+3		1+1		0+1		May 1995	Academy
28	(Australia)	Chris Coyne	CB	0+1						January 1996	Perth SC
25	(England)	Lee Hodges	M	0+1						March 1995	Academy
40	(England)	Gavin Holligan	F	0+1						January 1999	Kingstonian
5	(England)	Richard Hall	CB			0+1				July 1996	Southampton

== Transfers ==
=== In ===
Date	Pos.	Name	From	Fee
13 July 1998	FW	(England) Ian Wright	(England) Arsenal	£500,000
30 July 1998	DF	(England) Neil Ruddock	(England) Liverpool	£100,000
30 July 1998	DF	(Chile) Javier Margas	(Chile) Universidad Católica	£1,800,000
25 November 1998	FW	(England) Gavin Holligan	(England) Kingstonian	£100,000
14 January 1999	DF	(England) Scott Minto	(Portugal) Benfica	£1,000,000
27 January 1999	FW	(Italy) Paolo Di Canio	(England) Sheffield Wednesday	£1,750,000
27 January 1999	MF	(Cameroon) Marc-Vivien Foé	(France) Lens	£4,000,000
9 February 1999	MF	(England) Jimmy Bullard	(England) Ebbsfleet United	£30,000

=== Out ===
Date	Pos.	Name	To	Fee
1 August 1998	DF	(England) Lee Goodwin	(England) Dagenham & Redbridge	Free transfer
24 November 1998	MF	(England) Andy Impey	(England) Leicester City	£1,600,000
25 December 1998	GK	(Czech Republic) Luděk Mikloško	(England) Queens Park Rangers	Nominal
14 January 1999	FW	(Wales) John Hartson	(England) Wimbledon	£7,500,000
10 February 1999	DF	(England) Tim Breacker	(England) Queens Park Rangers	Free transfer
12 March 1999	DF	(England) David Partridge	(Scotland) Dundee United	£40,000
24 May 1999	MF	(England) Joe Keith	(England) Colchester United	Free transfer

Transfers in: ▼£9,280,000
Transfers out: ▲£9,140,000
Total spending: ▼£140,000
