= Steve Potts (footballer) =

English footballer (born 1967)

Personal information
- Full name: Steven John Potts
- Date of birth: 7 May 1967 (age 59)
- Place of birth: Hartford, Connecticut, United States
- Height: 5 ft 7 in (1.70 m)
- Position: Defender

Team information
- Current team: West Ham United (U23 Head Coach)

Youth career
- 1983–1984: West Ham United

Senior career*
Years	Team	Apps	(Gls)
1985–2002	West Ham United	399	(1)
2002–2003	Dagenham & Redbridge	21	(0)
Total		420	(1)

International career
	England School Boy	11	(0)
1983–1984	England U17	12	(0)
1984–1985	England Youth	7	(0)

Managerial career
- 2011–2012: West Ham U16s
- 2012–2015: West Ham U18s
- 2015: West Ham U21s
- 2015–2018: West Ham U18s
- 2018–2019: West Ham U23s
- 2019–2023: West Ham U23s (assistant)
- 2023–2024: West Ham U21s
- 2024–2025: West Ham U21s (assistant)
- 2025–: West Ham United (first-team coach)
- * Club domestic league appearances and goals

Steven John Potts (born 7 May 1967) is an English football coach and former professional footballer who is the head coach of West Ham United under-23s.

As a player, he was a defender notably in the Premier League for West Ham United where he made 399 league appearances, scoring 1 goal over a seventeen-year spell at Upton Park. He retired in 2003 following a spell with non-league side Dagenham & Redbridge in what was the only season during his career that he did not play for West Ham. He also represented the England national team eleven times at youth level.

Following retirement, Potts has held a variety of coaching roles at the West Ham academy including head coach of the U16, U18 and U21 teams.

== Career ==
Potts started his career at West Ham United as an apprentice in 1983, making his first appearance against Queens Park Rangers on 1 January 1985. Known as Pottsy, he played for West Ham United for the next seventeen years. Primarily a fullback, Potts developed into a 'utility' player, he spent large portions of his career playing at centre-half despite being undersized for such a position. He also on occasion featured in midfield.

Potts was West Ham United Club captain for a three years between 1993 and 1996, and was voted Hammer of The Year in 1993 and 1995, and runner up in both 1992 and 1994. During his career he amassed a total of 505 appearances for the club (good enough for ninth place in the club's all-time appearance charts), scoring only one goal, in a 7–1 win against Hull City in 1990. His last competitive appearance for the club was on 7 March 2001 against Chelsea, although he stayed on until 2002. In 1997 he was awarded a testimonial by West Ham. The game was played on 2 August 1997 and was a 2–0 win against QPR.

Potts transferred to Dagenham & Redbridge on 13 September 2002 and played there for a full season before retiring from football. In August 2011 he was appointed as coach for the West Ham United under-16 team. Potts was promoted to manage the West Ham United under-18 team in December 2012, taking charge of a 1–0 victory over Tottenham Hotspur in his maiden game. In January 2015, Potts was named as West Ham United Under-21 team coach.

For the 2021–22 season, Potts was named assistant coach of the under-23 team.

== Personal life ==
In August 2007, he completed The Knowledge and qualified to drive a Hackney carriage. In 2008, he ran the London Marathon in aid of the charity Children with Leukaemia, raising £24,052.99 in the process.

He coached his sons, Daniel and Freddie, at the West Ham United academy, and both signed their first professional contracts at the club. Daniel has since signed for Luton Town.

== Career statistics ==
Appearances and goals by club, season and competition
Club	Season	League		FA Cup		League Cup		Other		Total	
Club	Season	Apps	Goals	Apps	Goals	Apps	Goals	Apps	Goals	Apps	Goals
West Ham United	1984–85	1	0	0	0	0	0	0	0	1	0
West Ham United	1985–86	1	0	0	0	0	0	0	0	1	0
West Ham United	1986–87	8	0	0	0	0	0	1	0	9	0
West Ham United	1987–88	8	0	1	0	1	0	1	0	11	0
West Ham United	1988–89	28	0	7	0	6	0	2	0	43	0
West Ham United	1989–90	32	0	1	0	7	0	2	0	42	0
West Ham United	1990–91	37	1	7	0	2	0	1	0	47	1
West Ham United	1991–92	34	0	5	0	3	0	2	0	44	0
West Ham United	1992–93	46	0	2	0	2	0	6	0	56	0
West Ham United	1993–94	41	0	6	0	3	0	0	0	50	0
West Ham United	1994–95	42	0	2	0	4	0	0	0	48	0
West Ham United	1995–96	34	0	3	0	3	0	0	0	40	0
West Ham United	1996–97	20	0	1	0	1	0	0	0	22	0
West Ham United	1997–98	23	0	5	0	4	0	0	0	32	0
West Ham United	1998–99	19	0	1	0	2	0	0	0	22	0
West Ham United	1999–2000	17	0	1	0	1	0	8	0	27	0
West Ham United	2000–01	8	0	0	0	3	0	0	0	11	0
West Ham United	Total	399	1	42	0	42	0	23	0	506	1
Dagenham & Redbridge	2002–03	21	0	1	0	2	0	0	0	24	0
Career total		420	1	43	0	44	0	23	0	530	1

== Honours ==
West Ham United

- UEFA Intertoto Cup: 1999
- Football League Second Division: Promotion 1990–91, 1992–93
