= Neil Finn (footballer) =

English footballer (born 1978)

Personal information
- Date of birth: 29 December 1978 (age 47)
- Place of birth: Rainham, Essex, England
- Height: 6 ft 0 in (1.83 m)
- Position: Goalkeeper

Youth career
- West Ham United

Senior career*
Years	Team	Apps	(Gls)
1995–1998	West Ham United	1	(0)
1998	→ Dorchester Town (loan)		
1998	Aldershot Town	0	(0)
2004–2010	Romford	126	(0)
- * Club domestic league appearances and goals as of 17:21, 29 July 2021 (UTC)

Neil Finn (born 29 December 1978) is a former professional footballer. He played one game for West Ham United in the Premier League during the 1995–96 season, aged 17, becoming at that time the youngest player to ever to appear in a Premier League match. He remains the youngest goalkeeper to play in the Premier League.

== Career ==
Finn was a product of the West Ham youth academy, and began his professional career as a trainee in August 1995. After just three reserve games, he became the then youngest player to ever to appear in a Premiership match on New Year's Day 1996 against Manchester City, when first-choice goalkeeper Luděk Mikloško was suspended and Les Sealey was injured. West Ham manager Harry Redknapp declared his anger with the league, saying they had lacked common sense in not allowing him to bring in a more experienced goalkeeper, and claimed he was told he must play an outfield player in goal. Recalling the event in 2017, Finn remembered there was a lot of media attention, while the City fans chanted "who the fucking hell are you?", and in an interview with a West Ham fansite praised Mikloško and Sealey for helping to settle his nerves before the match.

He won a runners-up medal in the 1996 FA Youth Cup final with Frank Lampard and Rio Ferdinand. He was offered a new contract in July 1997, but joined Dorchester Town on loan in March 1998 and was released by West Ham two months later. After a period out of the game, he joined non-league side Romford in 2004.
