= Stan Lazaridis =

Australian soccer player (born 1972)

Personal information
- Full name: Stan Lazaridis
- Date of birth: 16 August 1972 (age 54)
- Place of birth: Perth, Australia
- Height: 1.75 m (5 ft 9 in)
- Positions: Left winger; left-back

Youth career
- Olympic Kingsway

Senior career*
Years	Team	Apps	(Gls)
1991–1992	Floreat Athena	28	(2)
1992–1995	West Adelaide	73	(6)
1995–1999	West Ham United	69	(3)
1999–2006	Birmingham City	191	(8)
2006–2008	Perth Glory	13	(0)
Total		374	(19)

International career
1989	Australia U17	5	(2)
2000	Australia Olympic (O.P.)	3	(0)
1993–2006	Australia	60	(0)
Medal record
Representing Australia
Men's Association football
FIFA Confederations Cup
Runner-up	1997 Saudi Arabia
Bronze medal – third place	2001 South Korea-Japan
OFC Nations Cup
Winner	2000 Tahiti
Winner	2004 Australia
- * Club domestic league appearances and goals

Stan Lazaridis (born 16 August 1972) is an Australian former professional soccer player. He was predominantly a left winger though he was known to perform at left-back. He notably played for Birmingham City and West Ham United and made 58 official appearances for Australia and was in the Australian 2006 FIFA World Cup squad.

In 2024, Lazaridis was appointed director of football at Perth Glory.

== Club career ==
His reputation as a young left-footed teenager began with Olympic Kingsway where, despite his age, he intimidated many a defender with his change of pace.

Lazaridis made his senior debut for West Adelaide Hellas in the Australian National Soccer League in the 1992 season. His dribbling ability and pace drew much attention on the Australian scene. At the end of the 1995 season he earned a move to Europe when West Ham United manager Harry Redknapp encountered Lazaridis playing for West Adelaide during West Ham's pre-season tour of Australia in May, 1995. He signed for £300,000; a poor debut and consistent injury problems made his debut season difficult when he made only six appearances. He scored his first goal for West Ham in a 1–1 away draw with Wimbledon on 18 March 1997. Over four seasons, Lazaridis played just 87 games for West Ham United and scored three goals. In 1999, he dropped a division to sign for Birmingham City when manager Trevor Francis signed him in a deal worth an eventual £1.7 million. Settling much better at St Andrew's, he played an important role in guiding the team up to the Premiership for the 2002–03 season, scoring one of the penalties in the play-off final shootout to help them get promoted to the Premier League. While at Birmingham he played in the 2001 Football League Cup Final.

Following promotion (and despite a raft of new signings) Lazaridis remained a regular player for the Blues, scoring the winner against local rivals Aston Villa in March 2003 and a classic goal against Everton in February 2004. After seven successful years at Birmingham City, in which he had become a fan favourite, Lazaridis was released at the end of the 2005–06 season after making 222 appearances for the club. He then looked to finish his career in Australia with A-League club Perth Glory.

Lazaridis made only 11 appearances for the Perth club in 2006–07. His time there was tainted when in January 2007, Lazaridis returned a positive drug test for anti-androgen Finasteride, a prescription alopecia medication, which was banned at the time. Although perhaps slim comfort to Lazaridis finasteride was removed from the banned list in large measure as a result of the widespread discontent that followed his unfortunate case becoming public.

While noting his previous good character and making clear there was no evidence he had taken performance-enhancing drugs, he was found to have breached the rules and was given a 12-month suspension from football, mostly backdated. In March 2008, Perth Glory manager David Mitchell cut Lazaridis from the club's A-League roster, prompting the player to retire.

== International career ==
Lazridis made his debut appearance for the Australia national team in 1993 as they played Kuwait. He has 60 international appearances for the Socceroos and has one goal which he scored against Cook Islands. He played a major role in four world cup campaigns and was in the Australian squad at the 2006 FIFA World Cup in Germany. He was on the field playing as left winger for the infamous 2–2 draw between Australia and Iran, in Melbourne during 1998 World Cup qualifying. The game was the second leg of home and away games between Oceania and Asia for the right to play at the 1998 France World Cup. The first leg was played in Tehran, Iran in front of approximately 128 thousand people, and was a 1–1 draw. Iran went to the World Cup as they scored twice in Australia, and therefore won the tie overall on the ‘at the time’ away goals rule. Thanks FIFA. Lazaridis was also part of the Australian squad at the 2000 Sydney Olympic games.

== Career statistics ==
=== Club ===
Appearances and goals by club, season and competition
Club	Season	League			Cup (Note: Includes National Soccer League finals, FA Cup, Football League Cup and A-League Pre-Season Challenge Cup matches.)		Continental		Total	
Club	Season	Division	Apps	Goals	Apps	Goals	Apps	Goals	Apps	Goals
West Adelaide Hellas	1992–93	National Soccer League	26	2	2	1	0	0	28	3
West Adelaide Hellas	1993–94	National Soccer League	23	3	0	0	0	0	23	3
West Adelaide Hellas	1994–95	National Soccer League	20	0	2	0	0	0	22	0
West Adelaide Hellas	Total		69	5	4	1	0	0	73	6
West Ham United	1995–96	Premier League	4	0	2	0	0	0	6	0
West Ham United	1996–97	Premier League	22	1	5	0	0	0	27	1
West Ham United	1997–98	Premier League	28	2	7	0	0	0	35	2
West Ham United	1998–99	Premier League	15	0	3	0	0	0	18	0
West Ham United	1999–2000	Premier League	0	0	0	0	1	0	1	0
West Ham United	Total		69	3	17	0	1	0	87	3
Birmingham City	1999–2000	First Division	31	2	4	0	0	0	35	2
Birmingham City	2000–01	First Division	31	2	8	0	0	0	39	2
Birmingham City	2001–02	First Division	32	0	2	0	0	0	34	0
Birmingham City	2002–03	Premier League	30	2	2	0	0	0	32	2
Birmingham City	2003–04	Premier League	30	2	3	0	0	0	33	2
Birmingham City	2004–05	Premier League	20	0	2	0	0	0	22	0
Birmingham City	2005–06	Premier League	17	0	3	0	0	0	20	0
Birmingham City	Total		191	8	24	0	0	0	215	8
Perth Glory	2006–07	A-League	11	0	2	0	0	0	13	0
Perth Glory	2007–08	A-League	2	0	0	0	0	0	2	0
Perth Glory	Total		13	0	2	0	0	0	15	0
Career total			342	16	47	1	1	0	390	17

=== International ===
Appearances and goals by national team and year
National team	Year	Apps	Goals
Australia	1993	3	0
Australia	1994	4	0
Australia	1995	6	0
Australia	1996	0	0
Australia	1997	13	0
Australia	1998	0	0
Australia	1999	0	0
Australia	2000	9	0
Australia	2001	9	0
Australia	2002	0	0
Australia	2003	2	0
Australia	2004	8	0
Australia	2005	3	0
Australia	2006	3	0
Total		60	0

== Honours ==
Birmingham City

- Football League First Division play-offs: 2002
- Football League Cup runner-up: 2000–01

Australia

- FIFA Confederations Cup: runner-up, 1997; 3rd place, 2001
- OFC Nations Cup: 2000, 2004
