= Danny Williamson (footballer) =

English footballer (born 1973)

Personal information
- Full name: Daniel Williamson
- Date of birth: 5 December 1973 (age 52)
- Place of birth: West Ham, London, England
- Position: Midfielder

Youth career
- West Ham United

Senior career*
Years	Team	Apps	(Gls)
1992–1997	West Ham United	51	(5)
1993	→ Farnborough Town (loan)	6	(0)
1993	→ Doncaster Rovers (loan)	13	(1)
1997–2000	Everton	15	(0)
Total		85	(6)
- * Club domestic league appearances and goals as of 02:19, 8 July 2007 (UTC)

Daniel Williamson (born 5 December 1973) is an English former professional footballer who played as a midfielder.

He notably played in the Premier League for West Ham United and Everton, as well as in the Football League for Doncaster Rovers and for non-league side Farnborough Town. He suffered a foot injury in 1997 which would eventually lead him to prematurely retire three years later.

== Early life ==
Williamson was born in West Ham, London in December 1973. As a youth, he cheered on the Hammers from the North Bank at Upton Park. He played for Newham and Essex Schoolboys, signed schoolboy forms with West Ham, completed a two-year apprenticeship and signed professional forms in 1992. He was a strong-running right-footed attacking midfielder, who liked to play in a central position but was equally at home on the right-hand side.

== Club career ==
=== West Ham United ===
After signing professional forms with West Ham in July 1992, Williamson was loaned out to non-league side, Farnborough Town, making his debut in a 3–2 home defeat against Runcorn on 6 February 1993 and a total of six appearances between February and March 1993. He was loaned out again to Third Division side, Doncaster Rovers, in October 1993 where he made 16 league and cup appearances, scoring three goals. He played the final three games of the 1993/94 season for West Ham, making his debut in a 2–0 win at Arsenal on 30 April 1994 and scoring his first goal for the club in a 3–3 draw with Southampton on 7 May 1994. Competition for the midfield places from John Moncur and Don Hutchison and an ankle injury restricted him to only four appearances in 1994/95. However, he gained a regular place in the first-team in the 1995/96 season, when he made 37 league and cup appearances and scored four goals, helping West Ham to finish in the top-half of the table for the first time in ten years. Harry Redknapp said of him, "He was an outstanding passer of the ball. He had a terrific shot on him and I always thought he was going to be a very good player." Another ankle injury interrupted his season in 1996/97, when he made 18 league and cup appearances. His season ended in March 1997 after he had surgery on the ankle. He made a total of 58 league and cup appearances for West Ham, scoring five goals.

=== Everton ===
In August 1997, Williamson moved to Everton in an exchange for David Unsworth and £1 million as Howard Kendall sought to add creativity and strength to the Everton midfield and Harry Redknapp sought a left-sided centre-half to fill a gap created by a long-term injury to captain Julian Dicks. He made his debut for Everton in a 2–1 victory over West Ham on 23 August 1997 and went on to make a total of 17 appearances for Everton in the 1997/98 season. He picked up a foot injury against Wimbledon on 13 December 1997 and the injury, which required surgery, and subsequent complications led him to miss the rest of the 1997/98 season and the two following seasons 1998–1999 and 1999–2000.

Williamson did return to training in September 1999, declaring he was relieved to be showing that his injury problems were behind him. However, after breaking down again in training, he never played another first-team game for Everton and his playing contract with the club was terminated at the end of September 2000, nine months early, which also marked the end of his playing career.

Williamson's time at Everton was a costly one for the club. He was labelled as one of the highest rated English players at the time of purchase and made a bright start to his Everton career.

== Personal life ==
Williamson lives in Essex and works for a property company.

== Career stats ==
Club Performance
Club	Season	League		FA Cup		League Cup		Other		Total
Club	Season	App	Goals	App	Goals	App	Goals	App	Goals	App	Goals
West Ham United	1992–93	0	0	0	0	0	0	0	0	0	0
West Ham United	1993–94	3	1	0	0	0	0	0	0	3	1
West Ham United	1994–95	4	0	0	0	0	0	0	0	4	0
West Ham United	1995–96	29	4	3	0	1	0	0	0	33	4
West Ham United	1996–97	15	0	2	0	1	0	0	0	0	0
West Ham United	Subtotal	51	5	5	0	2	0	0	0	58	5
Farnborough Town (loan)	1992–1993	6	0	0	0	0	0	0	0	6	0
Farnborough Town (loan)	Subtotal	6	0	0	0	0	0	0	0	6	0
Doncaster Rovers (loan)	1993–1994	13	1	2	2	0	0	1	0	16	3
Doncaster Rovers (loan)	Subtotal	13	1	2	2	0	0	1	0	16	3
Everton	1997–98	15	0	0	0	2	0	0	0	17	0
Everton	1998–99	0	0	0	0	0	0	0	0	0	0
Everton	1999–00	0	0	0	0	0	0	0	0	0	0
Everton	2000–01	0	0	0	0	0	0	0	0	0	0
Everton	Subtotal	15	0	0	0	2	0	0	0	17	0
Total		85	6	7	2	4	0	1	0	97	8
