= Ian Feuer =

American soccer player (born 1971)

Personal information
- Full name: Ian Anthony Feuer
- Date of birth: May 20, 1971 (age 55)
- Place of birth: Las Vegas, Nevada, United States
- Height: 6 ft 7 in (2.01 m)
- Position: Goalkeeper

Youth career
- Las Vegas Generals
- 1988–1989: Club Brugge

Senior career*
Years	Team	Apps	(Gls)
1989–1993	Club Brugge	0	(0)
1992–1993	→ Molenbeek (loan)	19	(0)
1993	Los Angeles Salsa	17	(0)
1994–1996	West Ham United	0	(0)
1995	→ Peterborough United (loan)	16	(0)
1995	→ Luton Town (loan)	14	(0)
1995–1998	Luton Town	83	(0)
1998	New England Revolution	26	(0)
1999	→ Rushden & Diamonds (loan)	3	(0)
1999	Colorado Rapids	19	(0)
2000	Cardiff City	0	(0)
2000	West Ham United	3	(0)
2000–2002	Wimbledon	5	(0)
2001	→ Derby County (loan)	2	(0)
2002	Tranmere Rovers	2	(0)
2002	Wolverhampton Wanderers	0	(0)
Total		209	(0)

International career^{‡}
1992	United States	1	(0)

Managerial career
- 2003–2011: Pepperdine Waves (assistant)
- 2007–2013: LA Galaxy (assistant)
- 2013–: USC Trojans (assistant)
- * Club domestic league appearances and goals as of 24 November 2006 ‡ National team caps and goals as of 24 November 2006

Ian Anthony Feuer (born May 20, 1971) is an American former professional soccer player who played as a goalkeeper. He is currently a volunteer assistant coach for the USC Trojans women's soccer team.

Born in Las Vegas, he played youth soccer in his home state and California before moving to Belgium at the age of sixteen, joining the youth team at Club Brugge. He signed a professional contract with Brugge but never made a first-team appearance, spending part of the 1992–93 season on loan with Molenbeek where he made his senior debut and his performances saw him win his first and only cap for the United States in a friendly against Morocco.

He returned to the U.S. in 1993 to join American Professional Soccer League side Los Angeles Salsa where he was named rookie goalkeeper of the season. In 1994, he joined English Premier League side West Ham United where he spent two years as a reserve goalkeeper, spending time on loan at Peterborough United and Luton Town. Luton later made the transfer permanent, paying £580,000 to complete the deal, and he played in 90 consecutive league matches for the club before his run was ended by a shoulder injury.

Unable to regain his place in the first-team, he instead joined Major League Soccer side New England Revolution to replace the retiring Walter Zenga. After one season, Zenga returned to play for the team resulting in Feuer being traded to fellow MLS side Colorado Rapids, following a brief loan spell with English non-league club Rushden & Diamonds. He replaced first choice Marcus Hahnemann who was sold midway through the 2000 season before returning to England with Wimbledon. However, he made just four league appearances during two years at the club and retired in 2002 after brief spells with Tranmere Rovers and Wolverhampton Wanderers. He later worked as a goalkeeping coach in the U.S., including a six year spell at LA Galaxy.

== Early life ==
Feuer, one of six children of show business parents, was born and raised in Las Vegas, Nevada. His father Ron was born in New York and raised in The Bronx, leaving home at the age of sixteen. He became a musician and toured with singers Diana Ross and Paul Anka and appeared in Elvis Presley's last shows in Las Vegas. His mother Rusty was a showgirl in the city and had appeared in opening acts for Rat Pack singers Frank Sinatra and Sammy Davis Jr. before becoming an agent. While growing up, he developed a love for soccer after beginning to play at age 8 when he joined local youth club Los Gatos following an invite from his friend Anthony, nephew of Las Vegas gangster Anthony Spilotro, as the club were short of players.

He joined another local youth team, the Generals, and by the age of eleven, Feuer had grown significantly taller than most of his team but had been described by his youth coach Larry Griffiths as "the clumsiest, and he wasn't going to make the team". However, Griffiths son Aaron was a friend of Feuer and refused to play unless his friend was included in the team. Griffiths made the decision to convert Feuer into a goalkeeper and trained with him every Saturday to improve his game, building a soccer equivalent of a pitching machine to shoot balls at the young goalkeeper at times for up to eight hours a day. He would face hundreds of shots every hour from the machine and Griffiths praised his determination and noted the improvement in his game, stating "He went from being the worst player on the team to one of the best in the state at 15 years old."

During his time with the Generals, Feuer was banned from playing soccer in the U.S. after an altercation with a linesman during a match. Having conceded a goal that he believed was offside, he remonstrated with the linesman over the decision and made physical contact and was subsequently sent off. Although Feuer states that he placed his hand on the shoulder of the official in order to get his attention, he was charged with physically assaulting the linesman and received a one-year playing ban.

When Feuer and his family moved to Canoga Park in Southern California, he briefly gave up his goal of playing professional soccer with the sport less popular in the state although he did play for the team at Canoga Park High School in his sophomore year in 1986. He later attended training sessions at a local semi-professional club Autobahn who were coached by Rildo da Costa Menezes but was told he was too young to play for the senior team. He developed an interest in skateboarding and surfing, but later attended a soccer clinic run by Harald Schumacher, a childhood hero of his, in Tuscaloosa, Alabama where he was awarded the best goalkeeper out of hundreds of players. Schumacher recommended that Feuer move to Europe to develop his skills and he immediately took his advice, calling home to tell his parents of his intention to move to Belgium, where his family had visited years before.

== Playing career ==
=== Belgium ===
Feuer moved to Belgium in 1988, where his Las Vegas youth team had previously played in a youth tournament. When they visited, he stayed with a local Belgian family and the same family contacted a neighbour who was connected to reserve team coach Gilbert Marmenhout at Belgian First Division club Club Brugge. He was offered a trial and impressed enough to be offered a year long deal to play with the club's under-16 squad. Brugge also organised a foster home with a local woman for him to live nearby and he attended a Belgian school that specialised in printing, where he learned Dutch. Unable to drive due to his age, Feuer would cycle to training every day.

After nine months with the youth side, he received a call-up for the reserve team, who were short of goalkeepers due to injury and sickness, to travel to France to play in an under-23 tournament. His performances in the tournament led him to be offered a professional contract with Brugge on his return to Belgium and saw him named as third-choice goalkeeper for the senior team. In 1991, he joined Molenbeek, also of the Belgian First Division, on loan from Brugge. He played nineteen league matches for Molenbeek and the club made approaches to Brugge about signing Feuer on a permanent deal but were rejected.

While with Molenbeek, Feuer was called up to the U.S. national team and made his international debut when he came on for Mark Dodd in the 71st minute of a 3–1 defeat against Morocco in Casablanca on a March 18, 1992. He was also named on the U.S. roster at the 1992 Summer Olympics in Barcelona as second choice behind Brad Friedel but did not feature in the competition.

=== Return to U.S. ===
Having returned to Brugge, Feuer grew frustrated with his lack of playing time and was not being paid by the club but was unable to secure a transfer as Brugge refused to release him from his contract. However, he met Rick Davis, general manager of Los Angeles Salsa, who appealed to FIFA regarding the situation and secured Feuer's release from his contract. He returned to the U.S. and played for Salsa in their 1993 American Professional Soccer League season, making 17 regular season appearances for them and keeping four clean sheets. He missed seven matches during the season due to undergoing knee surgery in August 1993 before returning for a play-off semi-final match against Vancouver 86ers. The team eventually lost to the Colorado Foxes in the championship game. The Salsa were coached by Rildo Menezes, who had previously coached him as a youngster, and the Brazilian described Feuer as "the best goalie in the U.S.". He was named Rookie goalkeeper of the season whilst with Salsa and was the league's most successful goalkeeper in overtime shootouts. (Note: If tied at 90 minutes, instead of matches ending in a draw, APSL matches would play a further 15 minutes of overtime before a penalty shootout.)

=== Move to England ===
Feuer joined London based club West Ham United for an undisclosed fee for the 1994–95 season becoming the first American goalkeeper to move to the first tier of English football. He did not play any competitive matches for them, with Luděk Mikloško being their first choice keeper. West Ham instead loaned Feuer to Division Two club Peterborough United on 20 February 1995 and he was to play sixteen games for The Posh that season.

On 11 September 1995, Feuer began another loan spell, this time with First Division side Luton Town on an initial three-month deal. He debuted for them two days later against Millwall and started fourteen straight league matches for the Hatters up to a game against Tranmere Rovers on 2 December 1995. On 14 December, he joined Luton on a permanent basis for a fee of £580,000. His first game as a full Luton player was on 16 December 1995 versus Portsmouth. In total he played 38 league games for Luton in the 1995–96 season, being named the club's player of the year.

He established himself as the club's first choice as keeper, seeing time in 97 League matches overall for Luton, until he tore a muscle his right shoulder during a match against Southend United in August 1997, ending a 90 match consecutive appearance streak. During his time out with injury, Kelvin Davis was chosen to deputise and, on his return, Feuer was unable to force his way back into the side.

=== MLS ===
On March 24, 1998, Major League Soccer (MLS) signed Feuer from Luton Town. MLS allocated Feuer to the New England Revolution on a four-year contract following Walter Zenga's decision to retire from playing. Having agreed to the move in an attempt to force his way into the squad for the 1998 FIFA World Cup, he made his debut for the club in an overtime shootout defeat to D.C. United. He went on make 26 appearances in the 1998 season and became the tallest player in the history of MLS. During the offseason, Feuer returned to England on loan to join Football Conference club Rushden & Diamonds. The club had been searching for an experienced goalkeeper following injuries to Mark Gayle and Mark Smith, leaving youth team player Steve Corry as the squad's only available goalkeeper. He had been recommended to manager Brian Talbot by coach Terry Westley who had signed Feuer during his time in charge of Luton in 1995. He made his debut for the non-league side in a match against Farnborough Town on 22 December 1998 before keeping a clean-sheet in his league debut four days later against Stevenage Borough. However, Feuer contracted a bout of flu during the match against Stevenage and was forced to miss the club's following match against Woking before returning to the starting line-up for an FA Cup tie against Premier League side Leeds United. Despite struggling to eat for two days prior to the match, Feuer decided to play and was credited with an impressive performance to keep a clean sheet and was named man of the match to help earn his side a replay, eventually losing 3–1 on 13 January 1999. He played seven matches in all competitions during his loan spell and the club made an attempt to sign Feuer on a permanent basis but were unable to afford the fee that the MLS wanted for his release.

When he returned to New England he was traded to the Colorado Rapids for a future draft consideration on February 24, 1999. The Revs traded Feuer when Walter Zenga announced his intention to return to playing for New England. On his arrival in Colorado, he was initially the club's reserve goalkeeper behind Marcus Hahnemann. However, when Hahnemann moved to Fulham during the season, Feuer stepped into the nets for the Rapids last nineteen games of the season.

=== Return to England ===
In January 2000, Feuer signed with Cardiff City on a monthly contract as a backup keeper to provide cover for Jon Hallworth, although he did not play a match for the club. A month later, he rejoined West Ham United as manager Harry Redknapp sought cover for Shaka Hislop who had suffered a broken leg. He made his debut, six years after originally signing for the club, when he was drafted in to replace injured Canadian goalkeeper Craig Forrest in a Premier League match against Derby County on 15 April 2000, becoming the tallest goalkeeper to play in the league. He made a further two league appearances, before moving to Division One club Wimbledon at the end of the 1999–2000 season. He spent the next two seasons with Wimbledon as understudy to Kelvin Davis. However, the club did loan him to Premiership side Derby County during the 2001–02 season following an injury to first choice goalkeeper Mart Poom. He was one of several players released by Wimbledon at the end of the 2001–02 season as the club looked to reduce costs due to financial difficulties.

Following his release, Feuer spent time on trial at Wycome Wanderers and Leyton Orient, where he played in three pre-season matches and was offered a permanent contract by manager Paul Brush. However, he failed to respond to the club's contract offer and on August 12, 2002, Feuer signed a week by week contract with Tranmere Rovers when their starting keeper, Keith Welch, was injured. He remained there for two weeks, playing in league matches against Colchester United and Cheltenham Town, before being asked to go on a trial with Arsenal. He spent six weeks at the North London based club but a move was cancelled by his former agent who Feuer described as "dissatisfied". Feuer instead went on a trial with Wolverhampton Wanderers. He joined the club on a non-contract basis as cover for the injured Michael Oakes during September 2002 where he featured as an unused substitute in two league games. Less than a week later, Crystal Palace attempted to sign Feuer when Matt Clarke was injured. However, they could not come to terms with Feuer and pulled out of the deal. Feuer then retired from playing professionally and returned to the U.S. to start a coaching career. He was appointed goalkeeper coach for LA Galaxy in 2007, remaining in the role until 2013 when he was replaced by Matt Reis.

== Personal life ==
His sister Debra Feuer is an actress and married Mickey Rourke in 1981, before divorcing in 1989. Feuer performed the non-speaking role of the Predator in the 2007 film Aliens vs. Predator: Requiem.

== Career statistics ==
Appearances and goals by club, season and competition
Club	Season	League			National cup		League cup		Other (Note: Includes Football League Trophy, the FA Trophy and Football League and MLS play-off matches)		Total	
Club	Season	Division	Apps	Goals	Apps	Goals	Apps	Goals	Apps	Goals	Apps	Goals
Club Brugge	1989–90	Belgian First Division	0	0	0	0	0	0	0	0	0	0
Club Brugge	1990–91	Belgian First Division	0	0	0	0	0	0	0	0	0	0
Club Brugge	1991–92	Belgian First Division	0	0	0	0	0	0	0	0	0	0
Club Brugge	1992–93	Belgian First Division	0	0	0	0	0	0	0	0	0	0
Club Brugge	Total		0	0	0	0	0	0	0	0	0	0
Molenbeek (loan)	1991–92	Belgian First Division	19	0	0	0	0	0	0	0	19	0
Los Angeles Salsa	1993	APSL	17	0	0	0	—		0	0	17	0
West Ham United	1994–95	Premier League	0	0	0	0	0	0	0	0	0	0
West Ham United	1995–96	Premier League	0	0	0	0	0	0	0	0	0	0
West Ham United	Total		0	0	0	0	0	0	0	0	0	0
Peterborough United (loan)	1994–95	Second Division	16	0	0	0	0	0	0	0	16	0
Luton Town	1995–96 (Note: Feuer joined the club on an initial three-month loan deal before signing permanently in December 1995.)	First Division	38	0							38	0
Luton Town	1996–97	Second Division	46	0	2	0	6	0	1	0	55	0
Luton Town	1997–98	Second Division	13	0	1	0	1	0	2	0	17	0
Luton Town	Total		97	0	3	0	7	0	3	0	110	0
New England Revolution	1998	MLS	26	0	—		—		—		26	0
Rushden & Diamonds (loan)	1998–99	Conference	3	0	2	0	—		2	0	7	0
Colorado Rapids	1999	MLS	19	0	—		—		2	0	21	0
Cardiff City	2000–01	Third Division	0	0	0	0	0	0	0	0	0	0
West Ham United	2000–01	Premier League	3	0	0	0	0	0	0	0	3	0
Wimbledon	2001–02	First Division	0	0	0	0	0	0	0	0	0	0
Wimbledon	2001–02	First Division	5	0	2	0	1	0	0	0	8	0
Wimbledon	Total		5	0	2	0	1	0	0	0	8	0
Derby County (loan)	2001–02	Premier League	2	0	0	0	0	0	—		2	0
Tranmere Rovers	2002–03	Second Division	2	0	0	0	0	0	0	0	2	0
Wolverhampton Wanderers	2002–03	First Division	0	0	0	0	0	0	0	0	0	0
Career total			209	0	7	0	8	0	7	0	231	0
