= Adrian Whitbread =

English footballer and manager (born 1971)

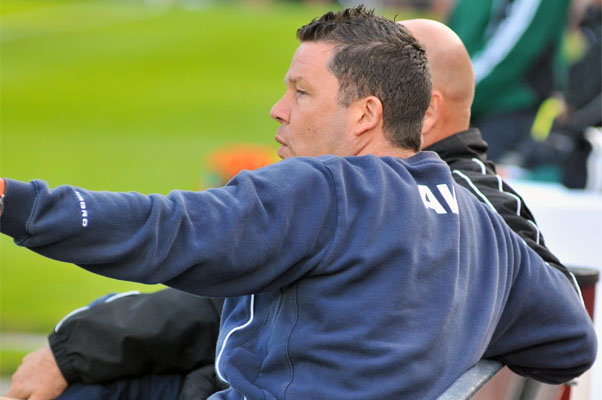
- Adrian Whitbread

Personal information
- Full name: Adrian Richard Whitbread
- Date of birth: 22 October 1971 (age 55)
- Place of birth: Epping, England
- Height: 6 ft 1 in (1.85 m)
- Position: Defender

Youth career
- ?–1989: Leyton Orient

Senior career*
Years	Team	Apps	(Gls)
1989–1993	Leyton Orient	125	(2)
1993–1994	Swindon Town	36	(1)
1994–1996	West Ham United	10	(0)
1995	→ Portsmouth (loan)	13	(0)
1996–2001	Portsmouth	134	(2)
2000–2001	→ Luton Town (loan)	9	(0)
2001	→ Reading (loan)	19	(0)
2001–2003	Reading	14	(0)
2003	→ Exeter City (loan)	7	(0)
Total		367	(5)

Managerial career
- 2012: Puerto Rico Islanders
- 2013–2014: Antigua Barracuda FC
- 2014–2015: Bahrain U23
- 2016–2017: Puerto Rico FC
- * Club domestic league appearances and goals

Adrian Richard Whitbread (born 22 October 1971) is an English football manager and former professional footballer.

As a player, he was a defender who notably played in the Premier League for Swindon Town and West Ham United. He also played in the Football League for Leyton Orient, Portsmouth, Luton Town, Reading and Exeter City before retiring from playing due to a persistent knee injury.

After his playing career ended, Whitbread became a coach. He had spells as assistant manager at Barnet, Brentford, Milton Keynes Dons and Leicester City. He has also coached overseas for Puerto Rico, Puerto Rico Islanders and Carolina Railhawks where he was head coach and for Antigua Barracuda FC, Bahrain U23 and Olympic team. Whitbread has frequently worked under the managership of Martin Allen and was most recently assistant manager at Chesterfield.

== Playing career ==
Whitbread began his professional career as a trainee with Leyton Orient in 1989. He captained the team at the age of 21, and helped Leyton Orient to promotion to the Football League Second Division in 1992. He made a total of 155 league and cup appearances for Leyton Orient in four seasons, before joining Swindon Town in July 1993 for £500,000, and made 38 league and cup appearances for Swindon in the 1993–94 season. Following Swindon's relegation from the Premier League, Whitbread joined West Ham United in August 1994 in part-exchange for Joey Beauchamp.

Whitbread's first-team opportunities at West Ham were limited and he made only 14 league and cup appearances. He went to Portsmouth on loan in November 1995 and eventually joined them on a permanent basis in October 1996 for £250,000. Following knee surgery in the summer of 2000, he was unable to obtain a regular place in the first-team and requested a transfer. He joined Luton Town on loan in November 2000, and then went on loan to Reading for the rest of the season in February 2001, before joining Reading on a permanent basis. He had made a total of 145 league and cup appearances for Portsmouth, in addition to 13 appearances while on loan to Portsmouth in 1995.

Whitbread signed a two-year contract with Reading in July 2001. He made 18 league and cup appearances before a knee injury sustained in training in December 2001 ruled him out of the rest of the 2001–02 season. He had a spell on loan at Exeter City in early 2003, where he made seven appearances, but a persistent knee injury forced his retirement from playing football in April 2003 without making any further appearances for Reading.

== Managerial career ==
After retiring, Whitbread joined Barnet in June 2003 as first-team coach, assisting Martin Allen. He later worked as assistant manager at Brentford, MK Dons, and Leicester City, all under Allen. He qualified for the UEFA Pro Licence in 2008.

Whitbread was named Assistant Coach of the Puerto Rico National Team and Puerto Rico Islanders in 2008. He held both positions through 2011. In December 2011, he was named head coach of Puerto Rico Islanders, now playing in the North American Soccer League. In 2013 Whitbread was appointed head coach of Antigua Barracuda FC. In April 2014 Whitbread was appointed as the Bahrain U23 & Olympic Head Coach. Whitbread re-joined Barnet as a first-team coach in the summer of 2015.

In August 2015, he was named as the inaugural coach of Puerto Rico FC. He served alongside Neil Sillett, who was the technical director. On 19 May 2017, he was relieved of coaching duties by Puerto Rico FC.

On his return to England, Whitbread assisted Allen at Barnet again, then followed him to Chesterfield in May 2018. He left Chesterfield in the following December following Allen's sacking.
