= Ian Bishop (footballer) =

English footballer

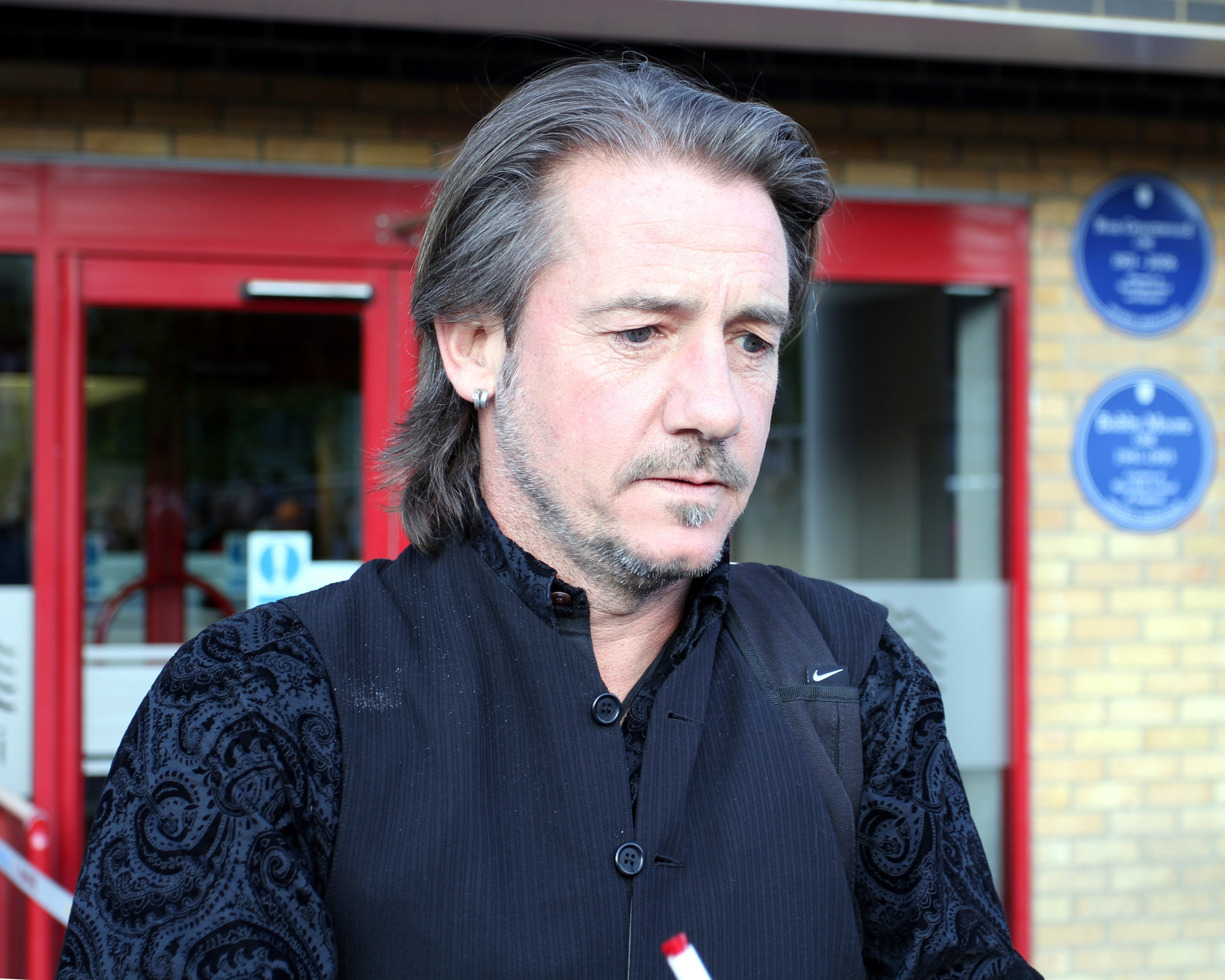
- Bishop at the Boleyn Ground, 2014

Personal information
- Full name: Ian William Bishop
- Date of birth: 29 May 1965 (age 61)
- Place of birth: Liverpool, England
- Height: 5 ft 11 in (1.80 m)
- Position: Midfielder

Youth career
- ?–1983: Everton

Senior career*
Years	Team	Apps	(Gls)
1983–1984	Everton	1	(0)
1984	→ Crewe Alexandra (loan)	4	(0)
1984–1988	Carlisle United	132	(14)
1988–1989	AFC Bournemouth	44	(2)
1989	Manchester City	19	(2)
1989–1998	West Ham United	255	(12)
1998–2001	Manchester City	78	(2)
2001	Miami Fusion	23	(0)
2002	Barry Town	2	(0)
2002–2003	Rochdale	8	(0)
2003–2004	Radcliffe Borough	10	(1)
2004	New Orleans Shell Shockers	16	(3)
Total		592	(36)

International career
- England B
- * Club domestic league appearances and goals

Ian William Bishop (born 29 May 1965) is an English former professional footballer who played as a midfielder.

He played in the Premier League for West Ham United and Manchester City, as well as in Major League Soccer for Miami Fusion and in the Football League with Everton, Crewe Alexandra, Carlisle United, AFC Bournemouth and Rochdale. He has also played in Wales for Barry Town, in the United States with New Orleans Shell Shockers and for non-league side Radcliffe Borough. He was capped once at England B level.

Since retirement, Bishop has worked as a technical director for Evergreen FC. He has also played as a professional poker player and now resides in Miami, Florida.

== Career ==
Bishop was born in inner city Liverpool but shortly afterwards moved to the new Cantril Farm housing estate, and on leaving school in July 1981 he joined Everton, turning professional for the 1983–84 season under the management of Howard Kendall – who had taken over during the same summer that Bishop had first joined the club.

However, he failed to break into the first team at Goodison Park, played just once in the First Division. He then tried his luck in the Fourth Division as one of Dario Gradi's first signings for Crewe Alexandra.

Bishop established his reputation at Carlisle United where he made 132 appearances from 1984 to 1988 before moving to AFC Bournemouth. He then signed for Manchester City in the summer of 1989 for £465,000 in a deal involving Paul Moulden on City's promotion to the First Division. Bishop was a good passer of the ball and in his 24 appearances for Manchester City in his first spell helped the team demolish their local rivals Manchester United 5–1 scoring City's third goal, on 23 September 1989. Despite being popular with the Manchester City supporters he was sold by then manager Howard Kendall to West Ham United in December 1989.

Bishop joined in the same week as Trevor Morley and Colin Foster, as manager Lou Macari continued to rebuild the West Ham squad. He spent the majority of his career at West Ham, playing 284 times between 1989 and 1998, scoring 16 goals and becoming something of a cult figure. Although Macari resigned before the season ended, he remained in favour under his successor Billy Bonds and then under the management of Harry Redknapp.

In early 1998, having become surplus to requirements at the Boleyn Ground, he returned to Manchester City, who were now battling against relegation to Division Two. His second spell at the club saw the team relegated to what was then Division Two, but then promoted to Division One and in the following season to the Premier League. Bishop was an integral player in the team which earned promotion to the Premier League but only played ten times for the club in the top flight as they fought an ultimately unsuccessful battle against relegation.

By the time City's relegation battle was lost, Bishop had headed across the Atlantic to sign for Miami Fusion. He played 23 games in the MLS before brief spells in the Northern Premier League with Burscough F.C. and Radcliffe Borough. He then finished his playing career with a stint at the New Orleans Shell Shockers in the USL Premier Development League.

== Personal life ==
Bishop claims that false accusations that he was gay and in a relationship with friend and teammate Trevor Morley was the reason behind him not being called up to the England team. Bishop said "Whether people think I was good enough or not, I wasn't going to displace Gazza (Paul Gascoigne), But other players did get caps and jumped ahead of me in the queue. And I heard rumours at the time that someone from the international set-up asked about my sexuality. My manager asked why I wasn't in the next England B squad. Why, after one game, was I not involved? He was my friend and I was watching him suffer. I was also getting abuse for no reason whatsoever."

Bishop now resides in Miami, Florida. He played in the Party Poker's World Series main event in the MGM Grand in Las Vegas.

Bishop previously served as the technical director for Evergreen Hammers FC, in Leesburg, Virginia (USA)

== Honours ==
Manchester City

- Football League Second Division play-offs: 1999

Individual

- PFA Team of the Year: 1990–91 Second Division
