= Les Sealey =

English footballer (1957–2001)

- Sealey in 1994

Personal information
- Full name: Leslie Jesse Sealey
- Date of birth: 29 September 1957
- Place of birth: Bethnal Green, London, England
- Date of death: 19 August 2001 (aged 43)
- Place of death: Southend-on-Sea, Essex
- Height: 1.85 m (6 ft 1 in)
- Position: Goalkeeper

Senior career*
Years	Team	Apps	(Gls)
1976–1983	Coventry City	158	(0)
1983–1990	Luton Town	207	(0)
1984	→ Plymouth Argyle (loan)	6	(0)
1990	→ Manchester United (loan)	2	(0)
1990–1991	Manchester United	31	(0)
1991–1993	Aston Villa	18	(0)
1992	→ Coventry City (loan)	2	(0)
1992	→ Birmingham City (loan)	12	(0)
1993–1994	Manchester United	0	(0)
1994	Blackpool	7	(0)
1994–1996	West Ham United	2	(0)
1996	Leyton Orient	12	(0)
1996–2001	West Ham United	2	(0)
1998	→ Bury (loan)	0	(0)
Total		459	(0)
- * Club domestic league appearances and goals

Leslie Jesse Sealey (29 September 1957 – 19 August 2001) was an English professional football player and coach.

He played as a goalkeeper, most notably in the top flight for Coventry City, Luton Town, Manchester United, Aston Villa, and West Ham United. He also played in the Football League for Plymouth Argyle, Birmingham City, Blackpool, Leyton Orient and Bury.

Following retirement, Sealey was appointed first team goalkeeping coach at West Ham United, a position he was in when he died of a heart attack on 19 August 2001.

== Career ==
Sealey joined Coventry City as an apprentice in 1975 and made his debut as a 19-year-old on 11 April 1977, in a 1–1 draw at Queens Park Rangers. He spent the next five seasons at the West Midlands club before joining Luton Town in 1983 for £100,000. He was a regular in the team for much of his time at Kenilworth Road, but he missed their 1988 League Cup triumph due to injury, his place being taken by Andy Dibble. A year later, Luton reached the final again and he was able to keep goal this time in a 3–1 defeat to Nottingham Forest in which Sealey had a poor game, including fouling Steve Hodge to concede a penalty (converted by Nigel Clough). He was dropped from the team for Luton's next game and replaced by Alec Chamberlain. Sealey never played for Luton again.

In December 1989, Sealey was loaned to Manchester United and made two league appearances during the final weeks of the season. He was named as goalkeeper for the 1990 FA Cup final replay against Crystal Palace after a poor display from Jim Leighton in the preceding 3–3 draw, and made several saves to help his side win 1–0. He later offered his winner's medal to Leighton, who had played throughout the cup run, but the FA subsequently granted medals to both players, who remained friends thereafter.

United signed Sealey on a permanent basis, and he was their regular goalkeeper throughout the 1990–91 season, keeping goal in their League Cup Final defeat to Sheffield Wednesday (in which he was injured, but refused to leave the field) and the Cup Winners' Cup Final victory over Barcelona the following month. He became a cult hero with United fans and got a standing ovation whenever he returned to Old Trafford. He was hoping to get a two-year contract, but was offered just a one-year deal and turned it down in favour of a transfer, and was signed by Aston Villa. For much of the first half of 1991–92, Sealey was Villa's first-choice goalkeeper, but he then lost his place to long-serving Nigel Spink and never played for the club again.

He had several games on loan at Birmingham City during the opening weeks of the 1992–93 season before returning to Manchester United on a free transfer in January 1993, this time as Peter Schmeichel's understudy.

In his second spell at Old Trafford, he made just two first-team appearances – once as a substitute when Schmeichel was sent off in the FA Cup Quarter-final against Charlton and the other in the League Cup final for which Schmeichel was suspended, which United lost 3–1 to his old club, Aston Villa. It meant his last four appearances for United were a Cup Winners Cup Final, two League Cup Finals and an FA Cup Quarter-final. He had, however, been an unused substitute for most of United's matches since his return to the club, though Gary Walsh was selected as substitute goalkeeper for the 1994 FA Cup final.

At the end of the season he was given a free transfer and joined Blackpool, but within six months he had left Bloomfield Road and returned to the Premiership with boyhood heroes West Ham.

Due to an injury crisis, Sealey made his Hammers debut as an outfield player, coming on as an attacking substitute against Arsenal in a 1-0 defeat on 16 September 1995. During his 18-month spell at the Boleyn Ground, he was understudy to Luděk Mikloško.

Sealey joined Third Division club Leyton Orient in 1996, and was their first-choice goalkeeper from the start of 1996–97.

In December 1996, the 39-year-old Sealey returned to West Ham in an exchange deal for 47-year-old Peter Shilton. He made his last first-team appearance on the final day of the 1996–97 season, fittingly against Manchester United at Old Trafford. He had come on as a substitute for Luděk Mikloško, West Ham's regular first-choice goalkeeper.

At the end of the 1997–98 season he was loaned out to Bury but did not make a first-team appearance. Upon his return to West Ham he was appointed as the club's goalkeeper coach, although he was still registered as a player during the 1999–00 season, taking him past his 42nd birthday in September 1999.

== Personal life ==
He was a nephew of Alan Sealey, another West Ham United player.

He was the father of footballers Joe and George Sealey. Joe notably played as a goalkeeper for West Ham United but at the age of 21 was forced to retire through injury.

== Death ==
Sealey was still employed as West Ham's goalkeeper coach when he died of a heart attack on 19 August 2001 at the age of 43. One of Sealey's pupils at West Ham was Stephen Bywater who wore the number 43 on his shirt as a tribute to his former coach. Also at the club were Sealey's sons, George and Joe.

== Honours ==
Luton Town

- Football League Cup runner-up: 1988–89
- Full Members' Cup runner-up: 1987–88

Manchester United

- FA Cup: 1989–90
- FA Charity Shield: 1990 (shared), 1993
- European Cup Winners' Cup: 1990–91
- Football League Cup runner-up: 1990–91, 1993–94
