= Michael Hughes (footballer) =

Northern Irish footballer

Personal information
- Full name: Michael Eamon Hughes
- Date of birth: 2 August 1971 (age 55)
- Place of birth: Larne, Northern Ireland
- Height: 5 ft 6 in (1.68 m)
- Position: Attacking midfielder

Team information
- Current team: Carrick Rangers (co-owner)

Youth career
- Carrick Rangers

Senior career*
Years	Team	Apps	(Gls)
1987–1988	Carrick Rangers	18	(1)
1988–1992	Manchester City	26	(1)
1992–1996	Strasbourg	83	(9)
1994–1995	→ West Ham United (loan)	17	(2)
1995–1996	→ West Ham United (loan)	28	(0)
1996–1997	West Ham United	38	(3)
1997–2002	Wimbledon	115	(13)
2002	→ Birmingham City (loan)	3	(0)
2003–2007	Crystal Palace	126	(7)
2007–2008	Coventry City	18	(0)
2009–2010	St Neots Town	?	(?)
Total		472	(36)

International career
1989–1990	Northern Ireland U23	2	(0)
1990	Northern Ireland U21	1	(0)
1991–2004	Northern Ireland	71	(5)

Managerial career
- 2011–2013: Carrick Rangers
- * Club domestic league appearances and goals

Michael Eamon Hughes (born 2 August 1971) is a Northern Irish football manager and former footballer who is a majority shareholder and co-owner of NIFL Premiership side Carrick Rangers.

As a player, he was an attacking midfielder who notably played top flight football for Manchester City, West Ham United, Wimbledon and Crystal Palace, including numerous seasons in the Premier League. He also played in Ligue 1 for Strasbourg and in the Football League for Birmingham City and Coventry City, having initially began his career in Northern Ireland with Carrick Rangers. He finished his career with non-league side St Neots Town. He was capped 71 times by Northern Ireland, scoring five times.

After retirement, Hughes returned to Carrick Rangers as first-team manager; he has also worked as the club's chief executive and co-owns the club.

== Club career ==
Hughes' career began with Carrick Rangers, before moving to Manchester City as a trainee. In August 1992, he moved to RC Strasbourg for a fee of £450,000. During his four years at Strasbourg, Hughes spent two years on loan to West Ham United. It was during the first of these two loan spells that Hughes would have a say in the outcome of the 1994–95 FA Premier League season. West Ham United were playing at home to Manchester United on the last day of the season. Manchester United's rivals for the title were Blackburn Rovers, who lost against Liverpool on the same day. That meant that had Manchester United beaten West Ham United, they would win the league. However Hughes put West Ham United ahead in the first half and despite a second half equaliser from Brian McClair, West Ham United held out to hand the title to Blackburn Rovers.

=== West Ham United ===
In July 1996, Hughes made the move to West Ham United permanent. In the process, he became the first British player to change clubs for free on a Bosman ruling. The following season Joe Kinnear took Hughes to Wimbledon in a £1.6 million deal.

=== Wimbledon ===
Hughes became embroiled in a contract dispute between Birmingham City and Wimbledon in 2002. In March 2002, Hughes played three matches for Birmingham on loan, but was injured before the club won promotion to the Premier League and a permanent switch fell through. Wimbledon then refused to take him back. The ensuing dispute over who held his registration continued for over a year and Hughes' career had to be put on hold. In October 2003, Hughes signed for Crystal Palace (who shared Selhurst Park with Wimbledon at the time) and an out-of-court settlement was reached with Birmingham.

=== Crystal Palace ===
At Palace, he quickly became a fans' favourite, and, for the 2004–05 season, Hughes was appointed team captain.

Following relegation, he was replaced in the role by defender Fitz Hall (a decision, by the Palace management, which proved unpopular). However, after a run of good form, Hughes was re-appointed team captain, in January 2006. He later lost the captaincy again, this time to Carl Fletcher. He was released by Palace in May 2007.

Peter Taylor commented on Hughes' Palace future claiming that: "Michael Hughes has basically been released, but his is slightly different because I'm really saying that something could also develop later on."

=== Coventry City ===
On 6 July 2007, Hughes joined his former manager Iain Dowie at Coventry City, signing a one-year contract.

On 22 May 2008, Michael Hughes was released by Coventry City following the expiry of his contract, having made 18 first team appearances during the 2007–08 season. Hughes fell out of favour with new Coventry manager Chris Coleman who eventually decided not to renew his contract.

=== St Neots Town ===
In March 2009, Michael joined St Neots Town as player-coach, working alongside former international teammate Steve Lomas.

== International career ==
Hughes won 71 international caps with the Northern Ireland national team, scoring five times.

== Managerial career ==
Hughes was appointed caretaker manager of Carrick Rangers after the sacking of Stephen Small. On 23 September 2013, Hughes stepped down as manager and was replaced by Gary Haveron. Hughes retained his position as the club's chief executive and majority shareholder.

== Career statistics ==
=== International ===
Appearances and goals by national team and year
National team	Year	Apps	Goals
Northern Ireland	1991	1	0
Northern Ireland	1992	6	1
Northern Ireland	1993	7	0
Northern Ireland	1994	7	0
Northern Ireland	1995	8	1
Northern Ireland	1996	6	0
Northern Ireland	1997	4	1
Northern Ireland	1998	6	0
Northern Ireland	1999	6	0
Northern Ireland	2000	3	1
Northern Ireland	2001	7	1
Northern Ireland	2002	4	0
Northern Ireland	2003	2	0
Northern Ireland	2004	4	0
Total		71	5

Scores and results list Northern Ireland's goal tally first, score column indicates score after each Hughes goal.

List of international goals scored by Michael Hughes
No.	Date	Venue	Opponent	Score	Result	Competition
1	2 June 1992	Weserstadion, Bremen, Germany	Germany	1–0	1–1	Friendly
2	3 September 1995	Estádio das Antas, Porto, Portugal	Portugal	1–1	1–1	UEFA Euro 1996 qualification
3	20 August 1997	Windsor Park, Belfast, Northern Ireland	Germany	1–0	1–3	1998 FIFA World Cup qualification
4	28 March 2000	Ta' Qali National Stadium, Ta' Qali, Malta	Malta	1–0	3–0	Friendly
5	5 September 2001	Windsor Park, Belfast, Northern Ireland	Iceland	2–0	3–0	2002 FIFA World Cup qualification

== Honours ==
Crystal Palace

- Football League First Division play-offs: 2004
