= John Moncur =

English footballer (born 1966)

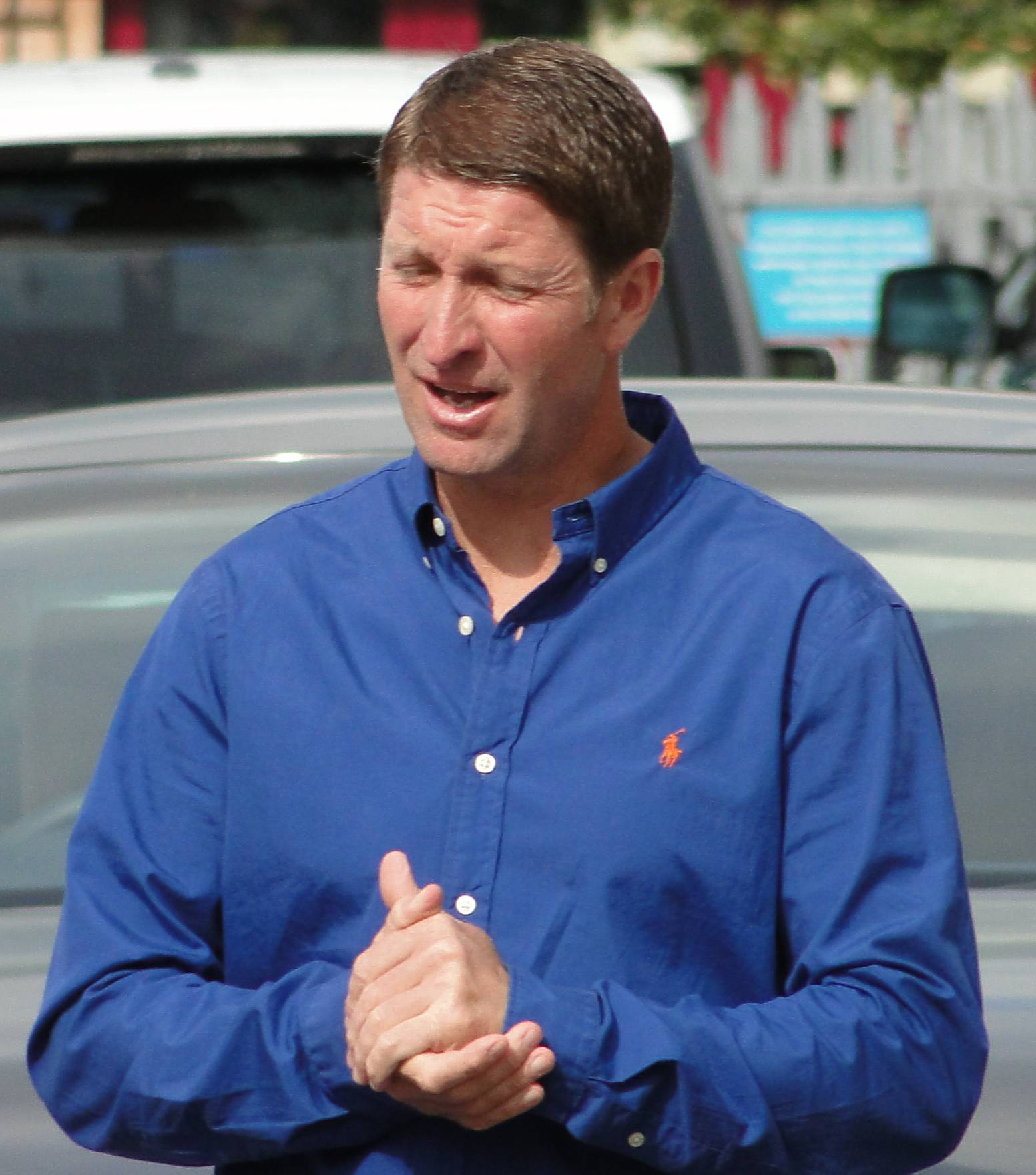
- Moncur in 2011

Personal information
- Full name: John Frederick Moncur
- Date of birth: 22 September 1966 (age 60)
- Place of birth: Stepney, England
- Height: 5 ft 7 in (1.70 m)
- Position: Midfielder

Youth career
- ?–1984: Tottenham Hotspur

Senior career*
Years	Team	Apps	(Gls)
1984–1992	Tottenham Hotspur	21	(1)
1986	→ Doncaster Rovers (loan)	4	(0)
1987	→ Cambridge United (loan)	4	(0)
1989	→ Portsmouth (loan)	7	(0)
1989	→ Brentford (loan)	5	(1)
1991	→ Ipswich Town (loan)	6	(0)
1992–1994	Swindon Town	58	(5)
1994–2003	West Ham United	176	(6)
Total		261	(13)

International career
1983	England U17	1	(0)
- * Club domestic league appearances and goals

John Frederick Moncur (born 22 September 1966) is an English football chairman and former professional player.

As a player he was a midfielder, notably playing top-flight football for Tottenham Hotspur, Swindon Town and West Ham United, with appearances for both the Robins and the Hammers coming in the Premier League. He also played in the English Football League for Doncaster Rovers, Cambridge United, Portsmouth, Brentford and Ipswich Town.

Following retirement, he became chairman of non-league side Grays Athletic; whilst at the club, he hired Julian Dicks as manager and Peter Shreeves as director of football.

== Career ==
After playing in Tottenham Hotspur's reserve side and having been loaned to several clubs, Swindon Town manager Glenn Hoddle signed Moncur for an £80,000 fee, towards the end of the 1991/92 season.

=== Swindon Town ===
He made his debut as a substitute in a 1–0 win over Port Vale on 4 August 1992, his full debut coming four days later, in a 1–1 draw at Millwall.

Moncur started the following season in the side, but injury spoiled most of the season; he made only fourteen appearances in the league, three of which were as a substitute. Returning to fitness before the play-off campaign started he rejoined the squad in place of Micky Hazard. Moncur played in the three play-off games — scoring a goal in the second leg of the semi-final at Tranmere Rovers, which helped assure Swindon's place at Wembley in the 1993 Football League First Division play-off final.

Moncur was almost ever-present in Swindon's Premier League campaign, missing just one game. He scored Swindon's first ever goal in the top flight, a 25-yard free-kick in an opening day 3–1 defeat at Sheffield United. In a notorious incident, Manchester United's Eric Cantona became frustrated when Moncur held him back after losing the ball, and stamped on Moncur's chest, an offence for which Cantona received a red card.

At the end of the season, with Swindon relegated, Moncur signed for West Ham United for £1 million in June 1994.

=== West Ham United ===
Moncur joined West Ham United in the summer of 1994 to bolster their midfield. Originally regarded as a classy midfield playmaker with a good passing ability, similar in style to Hammers' teammate Ian Bishop but with a combative style that often saw him in the referees' notebook. Moncur's first goal for West Ham came in a 2–1 away victory over London rivals Chelsea on 2 October 1994. He ended his first season with three goals in 35 appearances.

He was often a substitute for West Ham, particularly in his later career and was used sparing and strategically for the Hammers. Injuries further limited his appearances. Despite this, he became something of a cult figure at Upton Park due to his committed attitude and occasional flash of brilliance as well as reports of his humorous off-field antics. An indication of his popularity came in a fiery London derby against his former club Tottenham Hotspur on 24 April 1999 when he was sent off for two bookable offences, the latter a bad foul, and clenched his fists in defiance to the travelling West Ham supporters. West Ham eventually won the match 2–1. He was dismissed three times during his West Ham career.

Another memorable moment occurred when Moncur scored during West Ham's 5–4 victory over Bradford City in 2000 at Upton Park when Moncur scored with a rising drive from outside the penalty area, falling over as he did so. He then ran over to the West Ham fans and took his shirt off in celebration. When the celebrations died down, Moncur was unable to put his shirt back on and was seen running up the pitch with his shirt still only partially on and was, therefore, out of position as Bradford hit another goal immediately from the restart. This goal was his last for West Ham.

Moncur's last appearance came in a 3–1 defeat against Arsenal on 19 January 2003 away at Highbury. West Ham were relegated at the end of the season and Moncur retired from football after having played in the Premiership for 10 consecutive seasons.

== Personal life ==
Moncur is a Christian having turned to religion during his footballing career in order to help him deal with his anger. He has two sons who are also footballers; George currently plays for Bedford Town, and Freddy plays for Greys Athletic, both as midfielders.

In 2009 he became chairman of non-league side Grays Athletic; whilst at the club, he hired Julian Dicks as manager and Peter Shreeves as director of football.

He now works for a specialist recruitment company in the oil and gas industry.

== Honours ==
Swindon Town

- Football League First Division play-offs: 1993

West Ham United

- UEFA Intertoto Cup: 1999
