= Terry Brown (football chairman) =

English football executive (born July 1942)

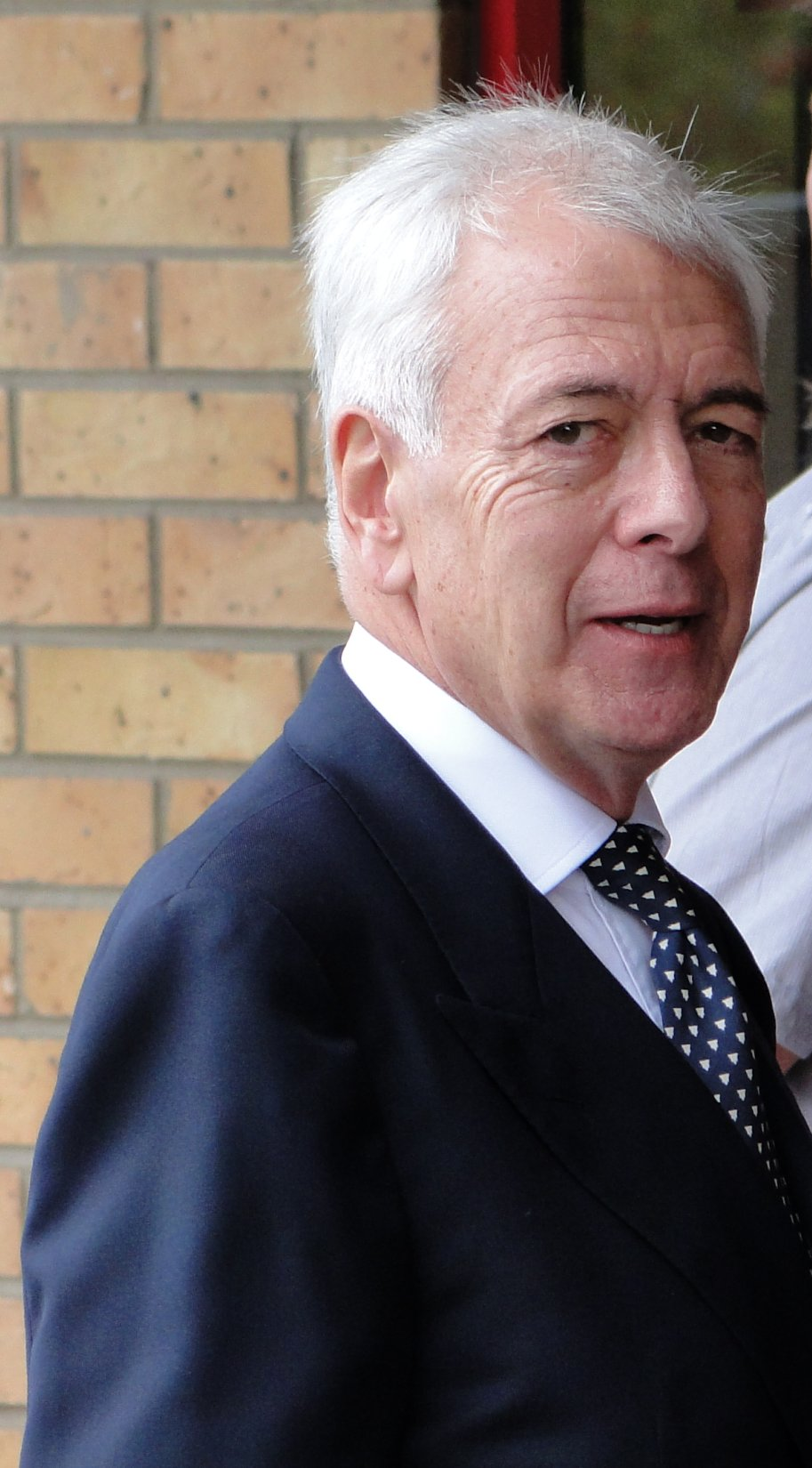
- Brown arriving at Upton Park August 2010
- Born: June 1942 (age 84)
- Occupations: Honorary Life President, West Ham United

Terence William Brown (born July 1942) is the former chairman and Honorary Life President of English Premier League football club West Ham United.

During his time as chairman of West Ham he was often portrayed as someone unpopular with West Ham fans. There were campaigns to remove him from his chairmanship and allegations of financial incompetence, during his chairmanship.

A group calling itself "Whistle" was created by fans of West Ham United that were critical of Brown, following the club's relegation in 2003 and the subsequent sale of many of their top players. In April 2004, the group published a dossier accusing the board of financial incompetence, and asking questions regarding the club's finances. Brown and West Ham threatened to initiate legal action towards its members. Brown denied there was a financial crisis at West Ham and urged "to ignore this nonsense and back our boys."

The group's aim was to seize control of the club and appoint a new management structure. But their attempts floundered as the existing directors retained the support of the club's major shareholders, the Warner and Cearns families. Legal proceedings were commenced against three members of Whistle. During 2004, two of the members submitted public apologies.

Brown's tenure as chairman ended in November 2006 with the sale of the club to an Icelandic consortium with businessman Eggert Magnússon as its chairman. Brown made £33.4m from the sale of his 7,392,000 shares in West Ham as part of this deal.

In his final full season as chairman he received £1,016,847 comprising salary of £490,800, bonus of £310,000, benefits in kind £13,807, and pension payments of £202,240.

On 13 August 2010, it was announced that Brown had acquired a small amount of shares from West Ham United's holding company WH Holding in conjunction with John Harris CBE and his son Daniel, known for building up the publicly listed Alba Group. Combined, their initial investment was £4,000,000. Brown is not on the West Ham board but is honorary life president.
