= Luděk Mikloško =

Czech footballer (1961–2026)

- Mikloško in 2016

Personal information
- Date of birth: 9 December 1961
- Place of birth: Prostějov, Czechoslovakia
- Date of death: 13 September 2026 (aged 64)
- Place of death: Ostrava, Czech Republic
- Height: 1.96 m (6 ft 5 in)
- Position: Goalkeeper

Youth career
- 1969–1975: FK Němčice nad Hanou
- 1975–1976: Železárny Prostějov
- 1976–1980: Baník Ostrava

Senior career*
| Years | Team | Apps | (Gls) |
| 1980–1982 | Hvězda Cheb | 23 | (0) |
| 1982–1990 | Baník Ostrava | 211 | (0) |
| 1990–1998 | West Ham United | 318 | (0) |
| 1998 | → Queens Park Rangers (loan) | 12 | (0) |
| 1998–2001 | Queens Park Rangers | 45 | (0) |
| Total | | 609 | (0) |

International career
| 1980–1982 | Czechoslovakia U21 | 24 | (0) |
| 1982–1992 | Czechoslovakia | 40 | (0) |
| 1983–1994 | Czechoslovakia Olympic | 2 | (0) |
| 1996–1997 | Czech Republic | 2 | (0) |
- * Club domestic league appearances and goals

Luděk Mikloško (9 December 1961 – 13 September 2026) was a Czech professional football player and coach.

As a player, Mikloško was a goalkeeper who spent eight years at West Ham United, where he made over 300 appearances and played in the Premier League. He also played in the Football League for Queens Park Rangers and in his native country for RH Cheb and Baník Ostrava. He was capped 40 times by Czechoslovakia and part of the team that competed at the 1990 FIFA World Cup. He was later capped twice by the Czech Republic.

Following his retirement, Mikloško returned to West Ham and worked as the club's goalkeeping coach before leaving in 2010. He had then moved back to the Czech Republic, where he died from stomach cancer in September 2026.

== Early life ==
Born on 9 December 1961 in Prostějov, Mikloško started playing football at home in Němčice nad Hanou. At the age of 13, he was scouted to be a goalkeeper for the youth league in his hometown.

== Club career ==
=== Czechoslovakia ===
Mikloško began his career with RH Cheb before joining reigning Czech champions Baník Ostrava in 1982. He left Czechoslovakia having made 234 appearances in the Czechoslovak First League.

=== West Ham United ===
Mikloško went to English side West Ham United on trial in December 1989. He transferred to West Ham United, managed by Lou Macari, for a fee of around £300,000 in February 1990. Mikloško made his league debut on 18 February in a 2–2 away draw against Swindon Town.

His fourth match was the second leg of the 1989–90 League Cup semi-final against Oldham Athletic. West Ham had lost the first leg 6–0, with Phil Parkes in goal in what proved to be his last game for West Ham after an eleven-year association with the club. From this point until the 1997–98 season, Mikloško was the first-choice goalkeeper.

Mikloško played 56 matches for West Ham in the 1990–91 season, including every league match, as they were promoted as runners-up from the Second Division. The club made the semi-finals of the FA Cup, before losing to Nottingham Forest, with him playing in all of their seven cup games. He was named Hammer of the Year in 1991, following a Man of the Match performance against Manchester United on the last day of the 1994–95 season, in which West Ham drew 1–1 with Manchester United at the Boleyn Ground to help secure United's rivals, Blackburn Rovers, their first league title in over 80 years. Mikloško conceded once before being sent off in a December 1995 away match against Everton after a foul on opponent Daniel Amokachi. As West Ham had no goalkeepers available as substitutes, defender Julian Dicks took over in goal, conceding twice in the second half as Everton won 3–0.

In his final season, Mikloško competed with Craig Forrest for the goalkeeper position. His last game came on 6 December 1997, a 2–0 away defeat against Derby County, scoring an own goal in the game. The following match, he was replaced in goal by Forrest.

=== Queens Park Rangers ===
Mikloško signed for Queens Park Rangers in 1998 for a nominal fee after a three-month loan spell. His last professional match occurred on 3 March 2001. In new coach Ian Holloway's first game in charge, QPR lost 3–1 at home to Sheffield United.

== International career ==
From 1980 to 1982, Mikloško represented Czechoslovakia under-21 24 times, being named best goalkeeper at the 1980 and 1982 editions of the Toulon Tournament. He made his debut for Czechoslovakia in a 3–1 friendly victory against Denmark on 27 October 1982. Between 1983 and 1984 he made two appearances for the Czechoslovakia Olympic team. Mikloško went to the 1990 FIFA World Cup with the Czechoslovakia squad, but did not play in the tournament. His final match for the national team took place on 2 April 1997 in a 2–1 home loss against FR Yugoslavia. Mikloško made 40 appearances for Czechoslovakia and two for the Czech Republic.

== Retirement and subsequent career ==
After his retirement, Mikloško returned to West Ham to take up a goalkeeping coaching role, but left the club in March 2010. He later returned to the Czech Republic and worked for a sporting investment agency. As of 2024, he was also employed as sporting director at his former club Baník Ostrava.

== Personal life and death ==
In 2021, Mikloško had an operation to remove a lump on his hip but a further tumour grew in his stomach. Having had radiotherapy which helped, further tumours meant chemotherapy would be required. In December 2024, he announced his decision to decline chemotherapy and withdraw from cancer treatment, saying that he wished to remain working in football.

Mikloško died on 13 September 2026, at the age of 64. West Ham, which Mikloško remained very fond of throughout his life, published his son's statement paying tribute to him upon his death.

== Honours ==
Individual

- Toulon Tournament Best Goalkeeper: 1980, 1982
- PFA Team of the Year: 1990–91 Second Division, 1992–93 First Division
