= 1991–92 Everton F.C. season =

English football club season

Everton
1991–92 season
- Chairman: David Marsh
- Manager: Howard Kendall
- Stadium: Goodison Park
- First Division: 12th
- FA Cup: Fourth Round
- League Cup: Fourth Round
- Full Members' Cup: Third Round
- Top goalscorer: League: Peter Beardsley (15); All: Peter Beardsley (20)
- Highest home attendance: 37,681 vs Liverpool (28 Dec 1991, First Division)
- Lowest home attendance: 4,588 vs Oldham Athletic (1 Oct 1991, Full Members' Cup)
- Average home league attendance: 23,148

During the 1991–92 English football season, Everton F.C. competed in the Football League First Division.

== Season summary ==
The summer of 1991 saw the departure of Everton hero Graeme Sharp, but the attack was bolstered by Peter Beardsley signed from Liverpool, Mo Johnston signed from Rangers while Alan Harper and Mark Ward also returned.

Despite these changes to the squad, in the 1991–92 season Everton continued to deteriorate, finishing 12th - their lowest finish for more than a decade.

== Final league table ==
Pos	Team	Pld	W	D	L	GF	GA	GD	Pts	Qualification or relegation
10	Crystal Palace	42	14	15	13	53	61	−8	57	Qualification for the FA Premier League
11	Queens Park Rangers	42	12	18	12	48	47	+1	54	Qualification for the FA Premier League
12	Everton	42	13	14	15	52	51	+1	53	Qualification for the FA Premier League
13	Wimbledon	42	13	14	15	53	53	0	53	Qualification for the FA Premier League
14	Chelsea	42	13	14	15	50	60	−10	53	Qualification for the FA Premier League

Source: World Football
Rules for classification: 1) Points; 2) Goal difference; 3) Goals scored

== Results ==
Everton's score comes first

=== Legend ===
Win	Draw	Loss

=== Football League First Division ===
Date	Opponent	Venue	Result	Attendance	Scorers
17 August 1991	Nottingham Forest	A	1–2	24,422	Pearce (own goal)
20 August 1991	Arsenal	H	3–1	31,200	Ward (2), Cottee
24 August 1991	Manchester United	H	0–0	36,085	
28 August 1991	Sheffield Wednesday	A	1–2	28,690	Watson
31 August 1991	Liverpool	A	1–3	39,072	Newell
3 September 1991	Norwich City	H	1–1	19,197	Ward
7 September 1991	Crystal Palace	H	2–2	21,065	Warzycha, Beardsley
14 September 1991	Sheffield United	A	1–2	19,817	Beardsley
17 September 1991	Manchester City	A	1–0	27,509	Beardsley
21 September 1991	Coventry City	H	3–0	20,542	Beardsley (3, 1 pen)
28 September 1991	Chelsea	A	2–2	19,038	Ebbrell, Beardsley
5 October 1991	Tottenham Hotspur	H	3–1	29,505	Cottee (3, 1 pen)
19 October 1991	Aston Villa	H	0–2	27,688	
26 October 1991	Queens Park Rangers	A	1–3	10,002	Cottee
2 November 1991	Luton Town	A	1–0	8,022	Warzycha
16 November 1991	Wimbledon	H	2–0	18,762	Cottee (pen), Watson
23 November 1991	Notts County	H	1–0	24,230	Cottee
30 November 1991	Leeds United	A	0–1	30,043	
7 December 1991	West Ham United	H	4–0	21,563	Cottee, Beagrie, Beardsley, Johnston
14 December 1991	Oldham Athletic	A	2–2	14,955	Sheedy, Nevin
21 December 1991	Arsenal	A	2–4	29,684	Warzycha, Johnston
26 December 1991	Sheffield Wednesday	H	0–1	30,788	
28 December 1991	Liverpool	H	1–1	37,681	Johnston
1 January 1992	Southampton	A	2–1	16,546	Ward, Beardsley
11 January 1992	Manchester United	A	0–1	46,619	
19 January 1992	Nottingham Forest	H	1–1	17,717	Watson
2 February 1992	Aston Villa	A	0–0	17,451	
8 February 1992	Queens Park Rangers	H	0–0	18,212	
23 February 1992	Leeds United	H	1–1	19,248	Jackson
29 February 1992	West Ham United	A	2–0	20,976	Johnston, Ablett
7 March 1992	Oldham Athletic	H	2–1	21,014	Beardsley (2)
10 March 1992	Wimbledon	A	0–0	3,569	
14 March 1992	Luton Town	H	1–1	16,707	Johnston
17 March 1992	Notts County	A	0–0	7,480	
21 March 1992	Norwich City	A	3–4	11,900	Johnston (2), Beardsley
1 April 1992	Southampton	H	0–1	15,201	
4 April 1992	Crystal Palace	A	0–2	14,338	
11 April 1992	Sheffield United	H	0–2	18,285	
18 April 1992	Coventry City	A	1–0	14,669	Beagrie
20 April 1992	Manchester City	H	1–2	21,101	Nevin
25 April 1992	Tottenham Hotspur	A	3–3	34,630	Beardsley (2), Unsworth
2 May 1992	Chelsea	H	2–1	20,163	Beardsley (pen), Beagrie

=== FA Cup ===
Round	Date	Opponent	Venue	Result	Attendance	Goalscorers
R3	4 January 1992	Southend United	H	1–0	22,606	Beardsley
R4	26 January 1992	Chelsea	A	0–1	21,152	

=== League Cup ===
Round	Date	Opponent	Venue	Result	Attendance	Goalscorers
R2 1st leg	24 September 1991	Watford	H	1–0	8,264	Beardsley
R2 2nd leg	8 October 1991	Watford	A	2–1 (won 3–1 on agg)	11,561	Newell, Beardsley
R3	30 October 1991	Wolverhampton Wanderers	H	4–1	19,065	Beagrie (2), Cottee, Beardsley
R4	4 December 1991	Leeds United	H	1–4	25,467	Atteveld

=== Full Members' Cup/Zenith Data Systems Cup ===
Round	Date	Opponent	Venue	Result	Attendance	Goalscorers
NR2	1 October 1991	Oldham Athletic	H	3–2	4,588	Watson, Newell, Cottee
NQF	27 November 1991	Leicester City	A	1–2	13,242	Beardsley

== Squad ==
Note: Flags indicate national team as defined under FIFA eligibility rules; some limited exceptions apply. Players may hold more than one non-FIFA nationality.

Pos.	Nation	Player
GK	WAL	Neville Southall
DF	ENG	Alan Harper
DF	ENG	Martin Keown
DF	ENG	Dave Watson
DF	ENG	Andy Hinchcliffe
MF	ENG	John Ebbrell
MF	ENG	Mark Ward
FW	ENG	Peter Beardsley
FW	SCO	Mo Johnston
FW	ENG	Tony Cottee
DF	ENG	Matt Jackson
MF	POL	Robert Warzycha
GK	AUS	Jason Kearton
MF	SCO	Pat Nevin

Pos.	Nation	Player
MF	ENG	Peter Beagrie
DF	ENG	Gary Ablett
MF	IRL	Kevin Sheedy
MF	NED	Raymond Atteveld
FW	ENG	Mike Newell
DF	WAL	Kevin Ratcliffe
FW	ENG	Stuart Barlow
DF	ENG	Neil McDonald
DF	NIR	Iain Jenkins
DF	ENG	David Unsworth
DF	ENG	Eddie Youds
MF	ENG	Ian Snodin
DF	ENG	Neil Moore

== Transfers ==
=== In ===
Date	Pos	Name	From	Fee
5 August 1991	FW	Peter Beardsley	Liverpool	£1,000,000
12 August 1991	DF	Alan Harper	Manchester City	£200,000
12 August 1991	MF	Mark Ward	Manchester City	£1,100,000
18 October 1991	DF	Matt Jackson	Luton Town	£600,000
20 November 1991	FW	Mo Johnston	Rangers	£1,500,000

=== Out ===
Date	Pos	Name	To	Fee
15 July 1991	MF	Marcus Ebdon	Peterborough United	Free transfer
17 July 1991	MF	Mike Milligan	Oldham Athletic	£600,000
15 August 1991	MF	Stuart McCall	Rangers	£1,200,000
1 October 1991	DF	Neil McDonald	Oldham Athletic	£500,000
15 November 1991	FW	Mike Newell	Blackburn Rovers	£1,100,000
15 November 1991	DF	Eddie Youds	Ipswich Town	£250,000

Transfers in: ▼£4,400,000
Transfers out: ▲£3,650,000
Total spending: ▼£750,000
