= 1990–91 Everton F.C. season =

English football club season

Everton
1990–91 season
- Chairman: Philip Carter (until 10 April 1991); David Marsh (from 10 April 1991)
- Manager: Colin Harvey (until 31 October 1990); Jimmy Gabriel (caretaker 3 November 1990); Howard Kendall (from 5 November 1990)
- Stadium: Goodison Park
- First Division: 9th
- FA Cup: Sixth Round
- League Cup: Third Round
- Full Members' Cup: Runners-up
- Top goalscorer: League: Tony Cottee (10); All: Tony Cottee (24)
- Highest home attendance: 40,201 (vs. Liverpool, 27 February 1991)
- Lowest home attendance: 4,609 (vs. Sunderland, 22 January 1991)
Home colours	Away colours

During the 1990–91 English football season, Everton F.C. competed in the Football League First Division. They finished 9th in the table, advanced to the 6th round of the FA Cup and were the runners-up in the Full Members' Cup, losing to Crystal Palace in the final at Wembley.

== Final League table ==
Pos	Team	Pld	W	D	L	GF	GA	GD	Pts	Qualification or relegation
7	Wimbledon	38	14	14	10	53	46	+7	56	
8	Nottingham Forest	38	14	12	12	65	50	+15	54	
9	Everton	38	13	12	13	50	46	+4	51	
10	Tottenham Hotspur	38	11	16	11	51	50	+1	49	Qualification for the Cup Winners' Cup qualifying round
11	Chelsea	38	13	10	15	58	69	−11	49	

Source: World Football
Rules for classification: 1) Points; 2) Goal difference; 3) Goals scored

== Results ==
Everton's score comes first

=== Legend ===
Win	Draw	Loss

=== Football League First Division ===
Date	Opponent	Venue	Result	Attendance	Scorers
25 August 1990	Leeds United	H	2–3	34,412	Nevin, Ebbrell
29 August 1990	Coventry City	A	1–3	12,902	Nevin
1 September 1990	Manchester City	A	0–1	31,456	
8 September 1990	Arsenal	H	1–1	29,919	Newell
15 September 1990	Sunderland	A	2–2	25,004	Sharp, Newell
22 September 1990	Liverpool	H	2–3	39,847	Hinchcliffe, McCall
29 September 1990	Southampton	H	3–0	23,093	Cottee 2, Ebbrell
7 October 1990	Nottingham Forest	A	1–3	25,790	McDonald
20 October 1990	Crystal Palace	H	0–0	24,504	
27 October 1990	Luton Town	A	1–1	10,047	Nevin
3 November 1990	Queens Park Rangers	H	3–0	22,352	Newell, Nevin, McDonald
10 November 1990	Sheffield United	A	0–0	21,447	
18 November 1990	Tottenham Hotspur	H	1–1	28,716	McCall
24 November 1990	Wimbledon	A	1–2	6,411	Sheedy (pen)
1 December 1990	Manchester United	H	0–1	32,400	
8 December 1990	Coventry City	H	1–0	17,472	McCall
16 December 1990	Leeds United	A	0–2	27,775	
22 December 1990	Norwich City	A	0–1	14,294	
26 December 1990	Aston Villa	H	1–0	27,804	Sharp
29 December 1990	Derby County	H	2–0	25,361	Newell, Nevin
1 January 1991	Chelsea	A	2–1	18,351	Sharp, Cundy J (og)
13 January 1991	Manchester City	H	2–0	22,774	Beagrie, Sheedy
19 January 1991	Arsenal	A	0–1	35,349	
2 February 1991	Sunderland	H	2–0	23,124	Sheedy, Beagrie,
9 February 1991	Liverpool	A	1–3	38,127	Nevin
23 February 1991	Sheffield United	H	1–2	28,148	Cottee
2 March 1991	Manchester United	A	2–0	45,656	Newell, Watson
16 March 1991	Southampton	A	4–3	15,410	Watson, Milligan, Newell, Cottee
23 March 1991	Nottingham Forest	H	0–0	23,078	
30 March 1991	Aston Villa	A	2–2	27,660	Warzycha 2
1 April 1991	Norwich City	H	1–0	20,485	Newell
10 April 1991	Wimbledon	H	1–2	14,590	Cottee
13 April 1991	Chelsea	H	2–2	19,526	Cottee, Ebbrell
20 April 1991	Crystal Palace	A	0–0	16,439	
24 April 1991	Tottenham Hotspur	A	3–3	21,675	Nevin, Stewart P (og), Cottee
4 May 1991	Luton Town	H	1–0	19,809	Cottee
8 May 1991	Derby County	A	3–2	12,403	Cottee 2, Sheedy
11 May 1991	Queens Park Rangers	A	1–1	12,508	Nevin

=== FA Cup ===
Round	Date	Opponent	Venue	Result	Attendance	Goalscorers
3	5 January 1991	Charlton Athletic	A	2–1	12,234	Sheedy 2
4	27 January 1991	Woking	H	1–0	34,724	Sheedy
5	17 February 1991	Liverpool	A	0–0	38,323	
5 (replay)	20 February 1991	Liverpool	H	4–4 (a.e.t.)	37,766	Sharp 2, Cottee 2
5 (2nd replay)	27 February 1991	Liverpool	H	1–0	40,201	Watson
QF	11 March 1991	West Ham United	A	1–2	28,162	Watson

=== League Cup ===
Round	Date	Opponent	Venue	Result	Attendance	Goalscorers
2:1	25 September 1990	Wrexham	A	5–0	9,072	Cottee 3, McDonald, Nevin
2:2	9 October 1990	Wrexham	H	6–0 (agg 11–0)	7,415	Sharp 3, Cottee, Ebbrell, McDonald
3	30 October 1990	Sheffield United	A	1–2	15,042	Pemberton J (og)

=== Full Members' Cup/Zenith Data Systems Cup ===
Round	Date	Opponent	Venue	Result	Attendance	Goalscorers
2	18 December 1990	Blackburn Rovers	A	4–1	5,410	Newell, Cottee, Watson 2
3	22 January 1991	Sunderland	H	4–1	4,609	Cottee 4
North SF	13 March 1991	Barnsley	A	1–0	10,287	Cottee
North F:1	19 March 1991	Leeds United	A	3–3	13,387	Beagrie, Warzycha, Milligan
North F:2	21 March 1991	Leeds United	H	3–1 (a.e.t.) (agg 6–4)	12,603	Cottee 2, Ebbrell
Final	7 April 1991	Crystal Palace	Wembley Stadium	1–4 (a.e.t.)	52,460	Warzycha 69'

== Squad ==
Note: Flags indicate national team as defined under FIFA eligibility rules; some limited exceptions apply. Players may hold more than one non-FIFA nationality.

Pos.	Nation	Player
GK	WAL	Neville Southall
DF	WAL	Kevin Ratcliffe
MF	ENG	John Ebbrell
MF	SCO	Stuart McCall
DF	ENG	Dave Watson
MF	SCO	Pat Nevin
DF	ENG	Neil McDonald
FW	SCO	Graeme Sharp
DF	ENG	Andy Hinchcliffe
DF	ENG	Martin Keown
FW	ENG	Tony Cottee
MF	NED	Raymond Atteveld
FW	ENG	Mike Newell

Pos.	Nation	Player
MF	IRL	Kevin Sheedy
MF	IRL	Mike Milligan
MF	ENG	Peter Beagrie
MF	POL	Robert Warzycha
DF	ENG	Eddie Youds
DF	ENG	Iain Jenkins
DF	ENG	Ian Snodin
MF	NIR	Norman Whiteside
FW	ENG	Stuart Barlow
MF	WAL	Marcus Ebdon
DF	ENG	Alan Harper
GK	AUS	Jason Kearton
