= 1989–90 Everton F.C. season =

English football club season

Everton
1989–90 season
- Chairman: Philip Carter
- Manager: Colin Harvey
- Stadium: Goodison Park
- First Division: 6th
- FA Cup: Fifth Round
- League Cup: Fourth Round
- Top goalscorer: League: Tony Cottee (13); All: Tony Cottee (15)
- Highest home attendance: 42,453 vs. Liverpool (23 September 1989)
- Lowest home attendance: 6,512 vs. Wimbledon (3 March 1990)
- Average home league attendance: 26,352

During the 1989–90 English football season, Everton F.C. competed in the Football League First Division. They finished 6th in the table with 59 points. The Toffees also advanced to the 5th round of the FA Cup and the 4th round of the League Cup.

== Final league table ==
Pos	Team	Pld	W	D	L	GF	GA	GD	Pts
4	Arsenal	38	18	8	12	54	38	+16	62
5	Chelsea	38	16	12	10	58	50	+8	60
6	Everton	38	17	8	13	57	46	+11	59
7	Southampton	38	15	10	13	71	63	+8	55
8	Wimbledon	38	13	16	9	47	40	+7	55

Source: World Football
Rules for classification: 1) Points; 2) Goal difference; 3) Goals scored

== Results ==
Everton's score comes first

=== Legend ===
Win	Draw	Loss

=== Football League First Division ===
Date	Opponent	Venue	Result	Attendance	Scorers
19 August 1989	Coventry City	A	0–2	17,981	
22 August 1989	Tottenham Hotspur	H	2–1	34,402	Newell, Sheedy
26 August 1989	Southampton	H	3–0	27,807	Whiteside, Newell, McCall
30 August 1989	Sheffield Wednesday	A	1–1	19,657	Sheedy
9 September 1989	Manchester United	H	3–2	37,916	Newell, Nevin, Sharp
16 September 1989	Charlton Athletic	A	1–0	11,491	Newell
23 September 1989	Liverpool	H	1–3	42,453	Newell
30 September 1989	Crystal Palace	A	1–2	15,943	Newell
14 October 1989	Millwall	H	2–1	26,125	Sheedy (pen), Whiteside
21 October 1989	Arsenal	H	3–0	32,917	Nevin 2, McDonald
28 October 1989	Norwich City	A	1–1	18,627	Cottee
5 November 1989	Aston Villa	A	2–6	17,637	Cottee, McGrath (og)
11 November 1989	Chelsea	H	0–1	33,737	
18 November 1989	Wimbledon	H	1–1	21,561	Sheedy (pen)
25 November 1989	Nottingham Forest	A	0–1	20,709	
2 December 1989	Coventry City	H	2–0	21,171	McCall, Watson
9 December 1989	Tottenham Hotspur	A	1–2	29,374	Cottee
17 December 1989	Manchester City	H	0–0	21,737	
26 December 1989	Derby County	A	1–0	21,314	McCall
30 December 1989	Queens Park Rangers	A	0–1	11,683	
1 January 1990	Luton Town	H	2–1	21,743	Whiteside, Sharp
13 January 1990	Southampton	A	2–2	19,381	Whiteside 2
20 January 1990	Sheffield Wednesday	H	2–0	25,545	Sheedy 2
3 February 1990	Liverpool	A	1–2	38,730	Sharp
10 February 1990	Charlton Athletic	H	2–1	21,442	Cottee, Whiteside
3 March 1990	Wimbledon	A	1–3	6,512	Sheedy
14 March 1990	Manchester United	A	0–0	37,398	
17 March 1990	Crystal Palace	H	4–0	19,274	Sharp, Cottee 2, Whiteside
21 March 1990	Millwall	A	2–1	11,495	Pointon, Cottee
24 March 1990	Norwich City	H	3–1	21,707	Cottee 2, Sharp
31 March 1990	Arsenal	A	0–1	35,223	
4 April 1990	Nottingham Forest	H	4–0	17,795	Cottee 2, Whiteside
7 April 1990	Queens Park Rangers	H	1–0	19,887	Cottee (pen)
14 April 1990	Luton Town	A	2–2	9,538	Cottee, Sharp
16 April 1990	Derby County	H	2–1	23,933	Atteveld, Sheedy
21 April 1990	Manchester City	A	0–1	32,144	
28 April 1990	Chelsea	A	1–2	18,879	Nevin
5 May 1990	Aston Villa	H	3–3	29,551	Cascarino (og), Newell, Sheedy

=== FA Cup ===
Round	Date	Opponent	Venue	Result	Attendance	Goalscorers
3	6 January 1990	Middlesbrough	A	0–0	2,075	
3 (replay)	10 January 1990	Middlesbrough	H	1–1 (a.e.t.)	24,352	Sheedy
3 (2nd replay)	17 January 1990	Middlesbrough	H	1–0	23,866	Whiteside
4	28 January 1990	Sheffield Wednesday	A	2–1	31,754	Whiteside 2
5	17 February 1990	Oldham Athletic	A	2–2	19,320	Sharp, Cottee
5 (replay)	21 February 1990	Oldham Athletic	H	1–1 (a.e.t.)	36,663	Sheedy (pen)
5 (2nd replay)	10 March 1990	Oldham Athletic	A	1–2 (a.e.t.)	19,346	Cottee

=== League Cup ===
Round	Date	Opponent	Venue	Result	Attendance	Goalscorers
2:1	19 September 1989	Leyton Orient	A	2–0	8,214	Newell, Sheedy
2:2	3 October 1989	Leyton Orient	H	2–2	10,128	Whiteside, Sheedy
3	24 October 1989	Luton Town	H	3–0	18,428	Newell 2, Nevin
4	22 November 1989	Nottingham Forest	A	0–1	21,324	

== Squad ==
Note: Flags indicate national team as defined under FIFA eligibility rules; some limited exceptions apply. Players may hold more than one non-FIFA nationality.

Pos.	Nation	Player
GK	WAL	Neville Southall
MF	SCO	Stuart McCall
MF	IRL	Kevin Sheedy
DF	ENG	Dave Watson
DF	ENG	Neil McDonald
FW	SCO	Graeme Sharp
DF	ENG	Ian Snodin
MF	NIR	Norman Whiteside
DF	WAL	Kevin Ratcliffe
FW	ENG	Tony Cottee

Pos.	Nation	Player
MF	SCO	Pat Nevin
FW	ENG	Mike Newell
DF	ENG	Martin Keown
DF	ENG	Neil Pointon
MF	NED	Raymond Atteveld
MF	ENG	John Ebbrell
MF	ENG	Peter Beagrie
MF	SWE	Stefan Rehn
DF	ENG	Mark Wright
GK	AUS	Jason Kearton
