= 1982–83 West Ham United F.C. season =

English football team season

West Ham United
1982–83 season
- Chairman: Len Cearns
- Manager: John Lyall
- Stadium: Boleyn Ground
- First Division: 8th
- FA Cup: Third round
- League Cup: Fifth round
- Top goalscorer: League: Paul Goddard (10); All: Goddard, François Van der Elst (12)
Home colours

The 1982–83 West Ham United F.C. season was West Ham United's second in the First Division, following promotion at the end of the 1980–81 season. The club was managed by John Lyall and the team captain was Billy Bonds.

== Season summary ==
The season started well for West Ham. By the end of the year they sat in 5th place in the league. A slump in form then occurred and they reached a low position of 14th at the end of March 1983. A late surge saw them win four of their final six games to finish in 8th place. Paul Goddard and François Van der Elst were joint top scorers with 12 goals in all competitions. The next highest scorer was penalty-taker Ray Stewart with 11. Phil Parkes made the most appearances – 50 in all competitions. The season also saw the début of Tony Cottee on 1 January 1983 in a 3–0 home win against Tottenham Hotspur, a game in which he scored.

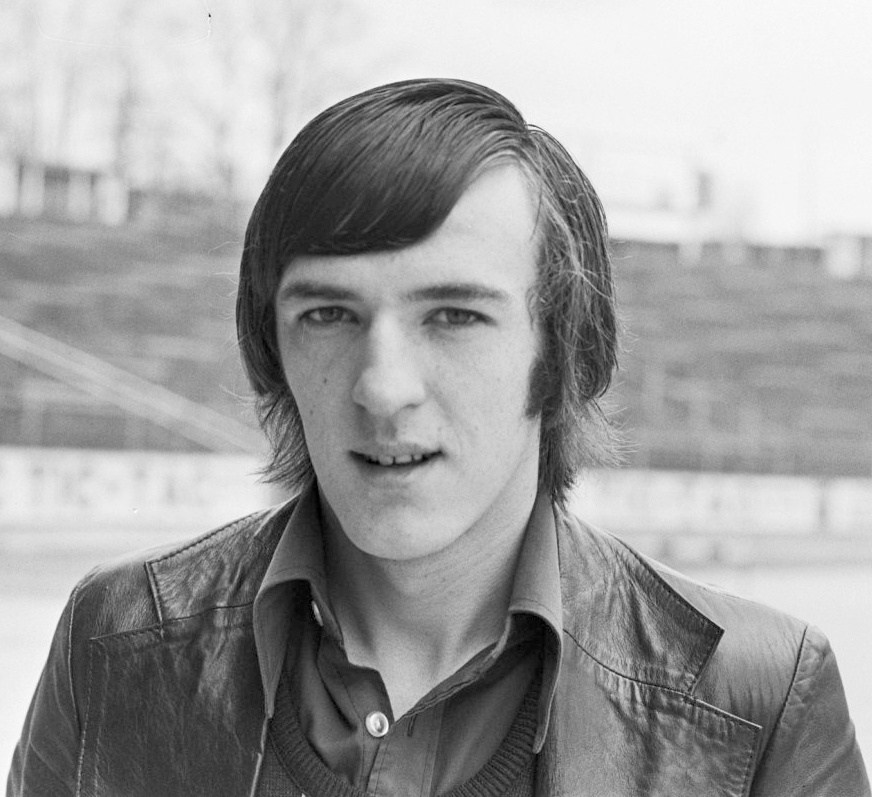
Joint-leading scorer François Van der Elst

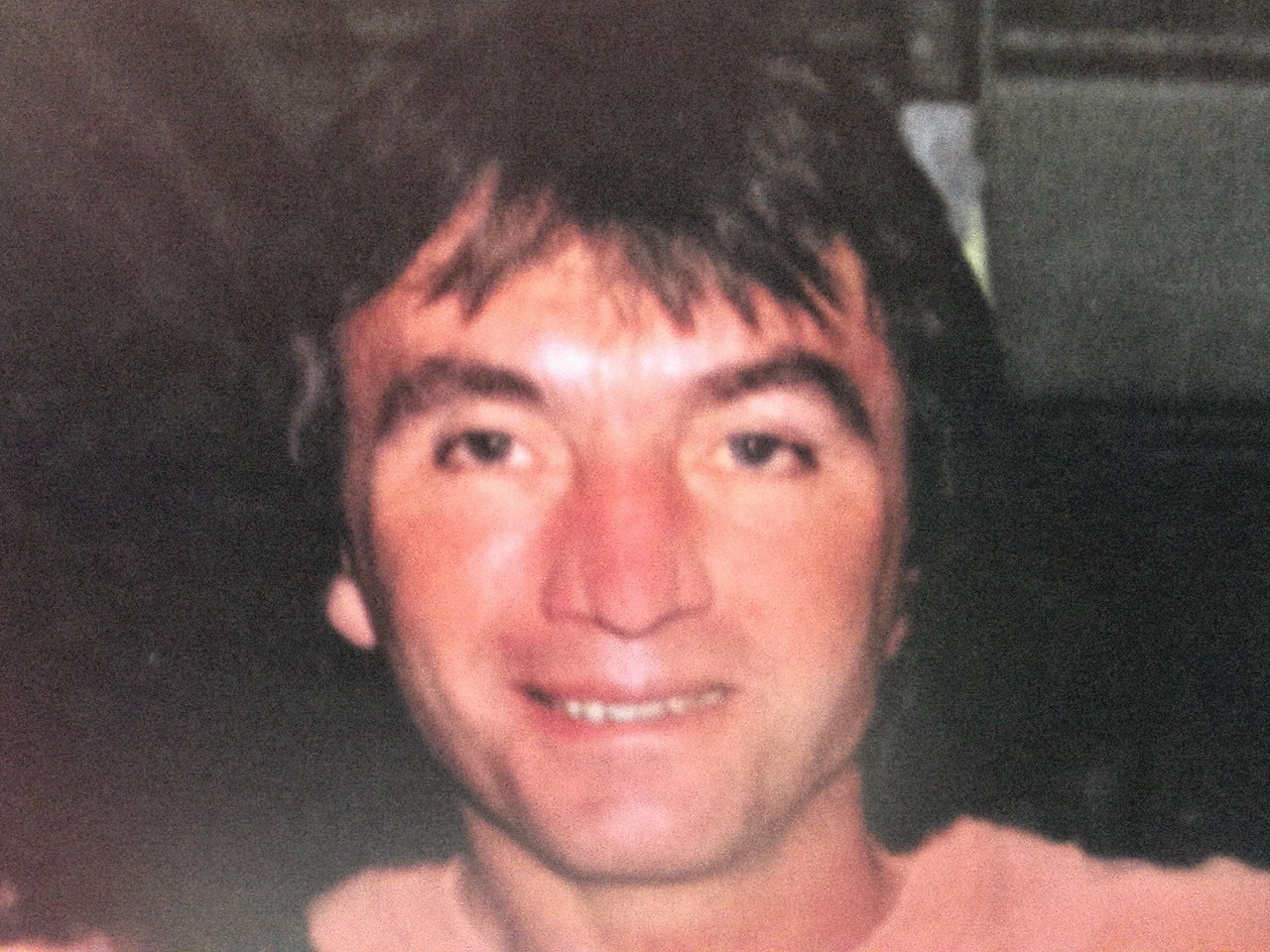
Club captain Billy Bonds

== League table ==
Pos	Team	Pld	W	D	L	GF	GA	GD	Pts	Qualification or relegation
6	Aston Villa	42	21	5	16	62	50	+12	68	Qualification for the UEFA Cup first round
7	Everton	42	18	10	14	66	48	+18	64	
8	West Ham United	42	20	4	18	68	62	+6	64	
9	Ipswich Town	42	15	13	14	64	50	+14	58	
10	Arsenal	42	16	10	16	58	56	+2	58	

Source: World Football
Rules for classification: 1) Points; 2) Goal difference; 3) Goals scored

== Results ==
West Ham United's score comes first

=== Legend ===
Win	Draw	Loss

=== Football League First Division ===
Date	Opponent	Venue	Result	Attendance	Scorers
28 August 1982	Nottingham Forest	H	1–2	24,796	Stewart
31 August 1982	Luton Town	A	2–0	13,403	Goddard, Bonds
4 September 1982	Sunderland	A	0–1	19,239	
7 September 1982	Ipswich Town	H	1–1	21,963	Lampard
11 September 1982	Birmingham City	H	5–0	18,754	Stewart, Martin, Van der Elst, Goddard, Clark
18 September 1982	West Bromwich Albion	A	2–1	15,204	Van der Elst, Clark
25 September 1982	Manchester City	H	4–1	23,833	Van der Elst, Goddard, Clark (2)
2 October 1982	Arsenal	A	3–2	30,487	Martin, Goddard, Van der Elst
9 October 1982	Liverpool	H	3–1	32,500	Martin, Clark, Pike
16 October 1982	Southampton	A	0–3	19,840	
23 October 1982	Brighton and Hove Albion	A	1–3	20,493	Devonshire
31 October 1982	Manchester United	H	3–1	31,684	Stewart, Goddard, Pike
6 November 1982	Stoke City	A	2–5	17,510	Stewart, Pike
13 November 1982	Norwich City	H	1–0	22,463	Clark
20 November 1982	Tottenham Hotspur	A	1–2	41,960	Van der Elst
27 November 1982	Everton	H	2–0	21,424	Bonds, Stevens (og)
4 December 1982	Aston Villa	A	0–1	24,658	
11 December 1982	Coventry City	H	0–3	19,321	
18 December 1982	Notts County	A	2–1	8,441	Dickens, Hunt (og)
27 December 1982	Swansea City	H	3–2	23,843	Stewart, Van der Elst, Goddard
29 December 1982	Watford	A	1–2	24,870	Stewart
1 January 1983	Tottenham Hotspur	H	3–0	33,383	Stewart, Cottee, Pike
4 January 1983	Luton Town	H	2–3	21,435	Clark, Cottee
15 January 1983	Nottingham Forest	A	0–1	17,031	
22 January 1983	West Bromwich Albion	H	0–1	19,887	
5 February 1983	Birmingham City	A	0–3	12,539	
26 February 1983	Southampton	H	1–1	19,626	Lampard
5 March 1983	Brighton and Hove Albion	H	2–1	16,850	Cottee, Dickens
12 March 1983	Liverpool	A	0–3	28,551	
19 March 1983	Stoke City	A	1–1	16,466	Bould (og)
22 March 1983	Manchester United	A	1–2	30,277	Devonshire
26 March 1983	Norwich City	A	1–1	17,369	Dickens
2 April 1983	Watford	H	2–1	22,647	Van der Elst, Swindlehurst
5 April 1983	Swansea City	A	5–1	13,282	Devonshire, Dickens (2), Pike (2)
9 April 1983	Sunderland	H	2–1	20,053	Goddard, Dickens
16 April 1983	Manchester City	A	0–2	23,015	
23 April 1983	Aston Villa	H	2–0	21,822	Bonds, Swindlehurst
30 April 1983	Everton	A	0–2	16,353	
3 May 1983	Ipswich Town	A	2–1	18,817	Stewart, Goddard
7 May 1983	Notts County	H	2–0	17,534	Van der Elst, Goddard
10 May 1983	Arsenal	H	1–3	28,920	Van der Elst
14 May 1983	Coventry City	A	4–2	11,214	Goddard, Swindlehurst, Cottee (2)

=== FA Cup ===
Round	Date	Opponent	Venue	Result	Attendance	Goalscorers
R3	8 January 1983	Manchester United	A	0–2	44,143	

=== League Cup ===
Round	Date	Opponent	Venue	Result	Attendance	Goalscorers
R2 First Leg	6 October 1982	Stoke City	A	1–1	18,079	Stewart
R2 Second Leg	26 October 1982	Stoke City	H	2–1 (won 3–1 on agg)	18,270	Goddard, Clark
R3	10 November 1982	Lincoln City	A	1–1	13,899	Goddard
R3 Replay	29 November 1982	Lincoln City	H	2–1	13,686	Stewart, Clark
R4	7 December 1982	Notts County	A	3–3	7,525	Van der Elst (3) 64', 74', 85'
R4 Replay	21 December 1982	Notts County	H	3–0	13,140	Stewart (pen) 30', Clark 64', Allen 88'
R5	18 January 1983	Liverpool	A	1–2	23,393	Allen 71'

== Squad ==
Note: Flags indicate national team as defined under FIFA eligibility rules; some limited exceptions apply. Players may hold more than one non-FIFA nationality.

Pos.	Nation	Player
MF	ENG	Paul Allen
MF	ENG	Bobby Barnes
DF	ENG	Billy Bonds (captain)
MF	ENG	Trevor Brooking
DF	ENG	Paul Brush
FW	SCO	Sandy Clark
FW	ENG	Tony Cottee
DF	SCO	George Cowie
MF	ENG	Alan Devonshire
MF	ENG	Alan Dickens
MF	ENG	Joe Gallagher

Pos.	Nation	Player
FW	ENG	Paul Goddard
DF	ENG	Frank Lampard
DF	ENG	Alvin Martin
FW	ENG	Nicky Morgan
MF	ENG	Jimmy Neighbour
DF	SCO	Neil Orr
GK	ENG	Phil Parkes
MF	ENG	Geoff Pike
DF	SCO	Ray Stewart
FW	ENG	Dave Swindlehurst
FW	BEL	François Van der Elst
