= 1983–84 West Ham United F.C. season =

English football team season

West Ham United
1983–84 season
- Chairman: Len Cearns
- Manager: John Lyall
- Stadium: Boleyn Ground
- First Division: 9th
- FA Cup: Fifth round
- League Cup: Fourth round
- Top goalscorer: League: Tony Cottee (15); All: Cottee (19)
Home colours

The 1983–84 West Ham United F.C. season was West Ham's third in the First Division since their return at the end of the 1980–81 season. The club was managed by John Lyall and the team captain was Billy Bonds.

== Season summary ==
The season started well for West Ham with them winning their first five games. They maintained good form until the end of 1983, when they were in third place in the league. They had not been lower than fifth place. A slump towards the end of the season saw them fall to their lowest place during the season, ninth place. Tony Cottee was the club's top scorer with 19 goals in all competitions. The next highest scorer was Dave Swindlehurst with 15. Steve Walford made the most appearances – 50 in all competitions. The season also saw the last game for West Ham by Trevor Brooking.

In the League Cup, West Ham recorded their biggest win in the competition when they beat Bury 10–0 in the second round second leg, to win the tie 12–1 on aggregate. The game was watched by only 10,896 people, the club's lowest home attendance for 30 years.

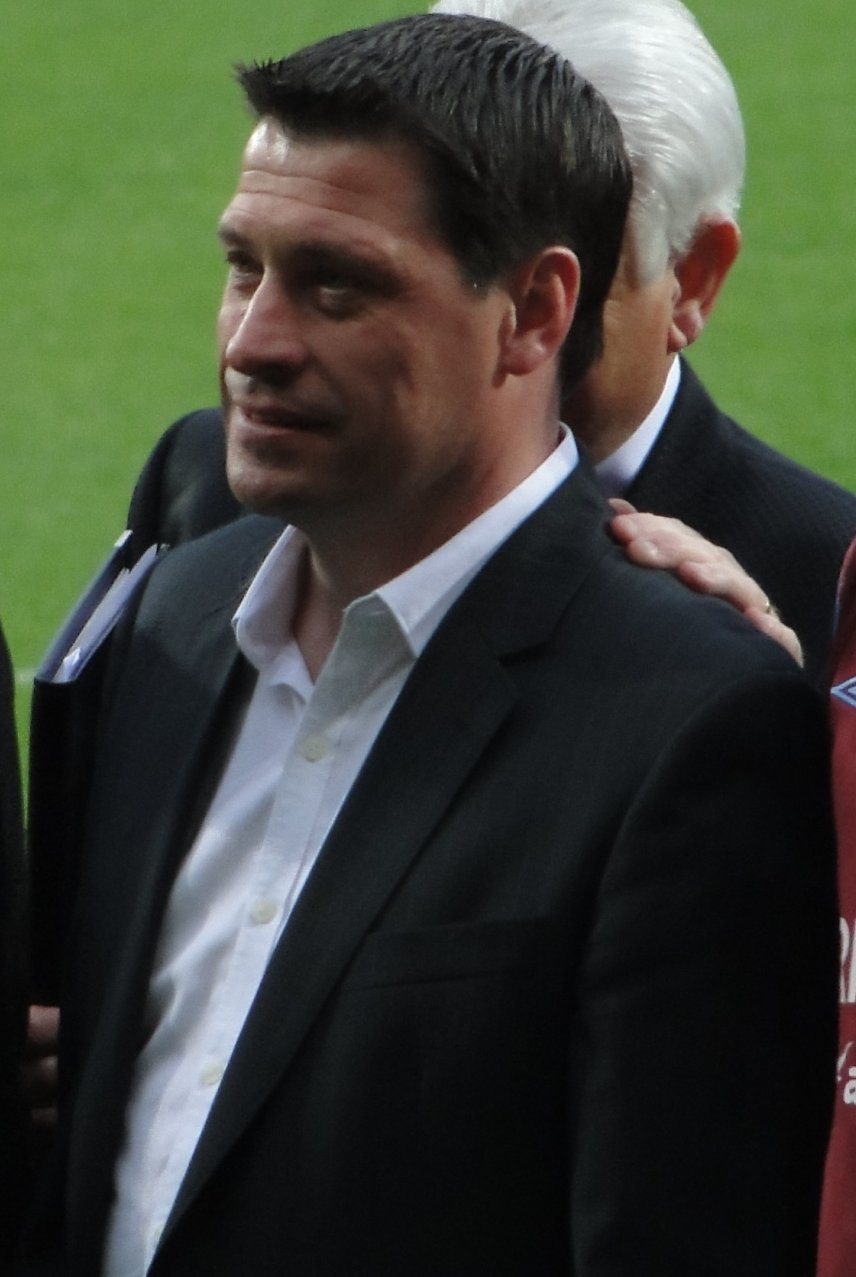
Leading scorer, Tony Cottee

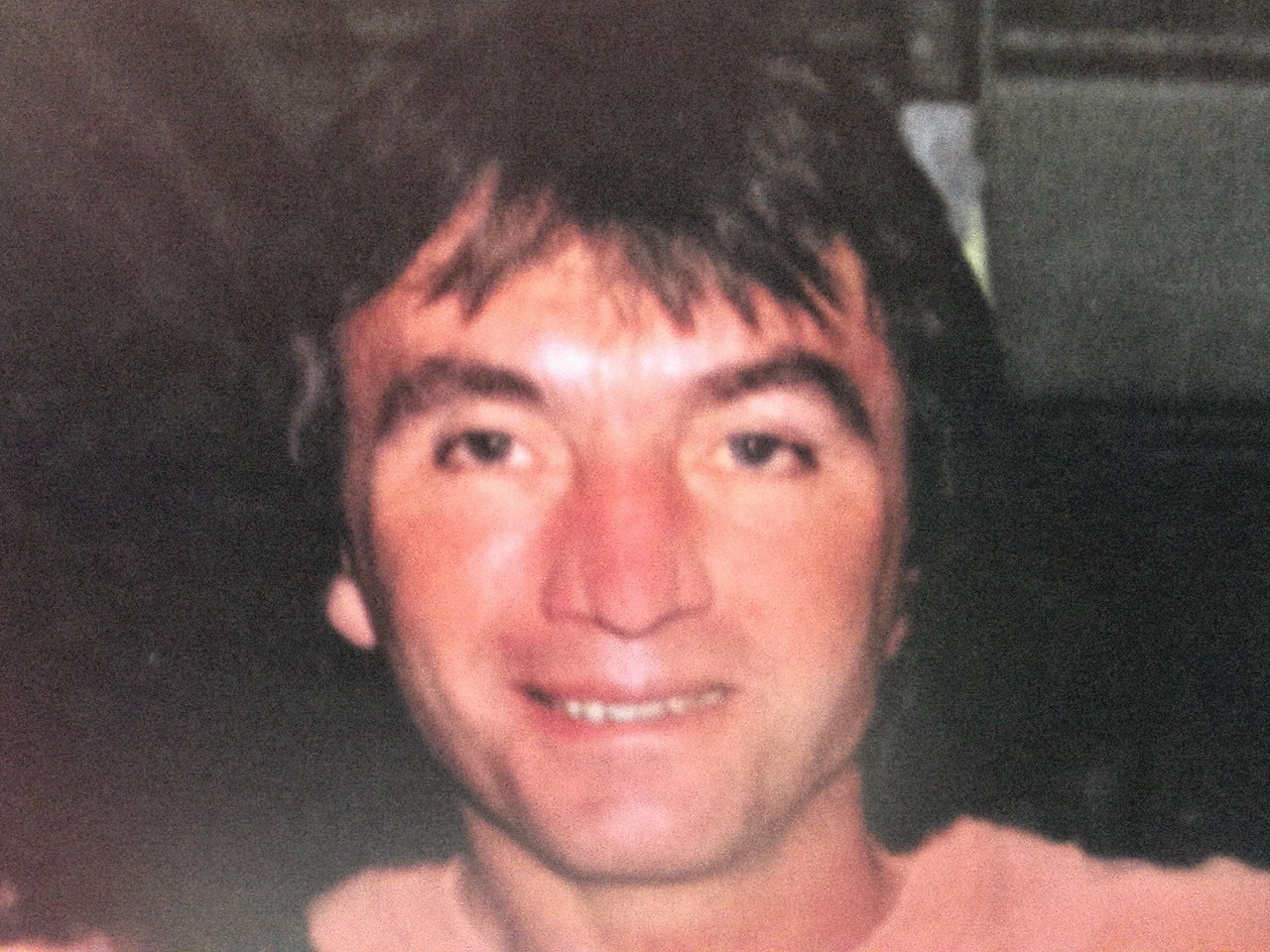
Club captain, Billy Bonds

== League table ==
Pos	Team	Pld	W	D	L	GF	GA	GD	Pts	Qualification or relegation
7	Everton	42	16	14	12	44	42	+2	62	Qualification for the European Cup Winners' Cup first round (Note: Everton qualified for the European Cup Winners' Cup as the 1983–84 FA Cup winners.)
8	Tottenham Hotspur	42	17	10	15	64	65	−1	61	Qualification for the UEFA Cup first round (Note: Tottenham Hotspur qualified for the UEFA Cup as the 1983–84 UEFA Cup winners.)
9	West Ham United	42	17	9	16	60	55	+5	60	
10	Aston Villa	42	17	9	16	59	61	−2	60	
11	Watford	42	16	9	17	68	77	−9	57	

Source: World Football
Rules for classification: 1) Points; 2) Goal difference; 3) Goals scored

== Results ==
West Ham United's score comes first

=== Legend ===
Win	Draw	Loss

=== Football League First Division ===
Date	Opponent	Venue	Result	Attendance	Scorers
27 August 1983	Birmingham City	H	4–0	19,729	Martin, Cottee (2), Swindlehurst
29 August 1983	Everton	A	1–0	20,999	Walford
3 September 1983	Tottenham Hotspur	A	2–0	38,042	Whitton, Swindlehurst
6 September 1983	Leicester City	H	3–1	22,131	Walford, Cottee, Swindlehurst
10 September 1983	Coventry City	H	5–2	23,077	Whitton (2), Swindlehurst (3)
17 September 1983	West Bromwich Albion	A	0–1	15,113	
24 September 1983	Notts County	H	3–0	20,613	Stewart, Goddard, Brooking
1 October 1983	Stoke City	A	1–3	13,643	Stewart
15 October 1983	Liverpool	H	1–3	32,535	Devonshire
22 October 1983	Norwich City	H	0–0	18,958	
28 October 1983	Watford	A	0–0	14,559	
5 November 1983	Ipswich Town	H	2–1	20,682	Swindlehurst (2)
12 November 1983	Wolverhampton Wanderers	A	3–0	12,062	Cottee, Swindlehurst, Brooking
19 November 1983	Sunderland	A	1–0	19,921	Swindlehurst
27 November 1983	Manchester United	H	1–1	23,255	Swindlehurst
3 December 1983	Aston Villa	A	0–1	21,297	
10 December 1983	Arsenal	H	3–1	25,118	Brooking, Whyte (og), Pike
17 December 1983	Nottingham Forest	A	0–3	14,440	
26 December 1983	Southampton	H	0–1	22,221	
27 December 1983	Luton Town	A	1–0	16,343	Cottee
31 December 1983	Tottenham Hotspur	H	4–1	30,939	Stewart, Martin, Cottee, Brooking
2 January 1984	Notts County	A	2–2	8,667	Stewart, Swindlehurst
14 January 1984	Birmingham City	A	0–3	10,334	
21 January 1984	West Bromwich Albion	H	1–0	17,213	Cottee
4 February 1984	Stoke City	H	3–0	18,775	Stewart, Cottee, Barnes
7 February 1984	Queens Park Rangers	A	1–1	20,102	Cottee
11 February 1984	Coventry City	A	2–1	13,290	Cottee, Bamber (og)
21 February 1984	Watford	H	2–4	21,263	Barnes, Swindlehurst
25 February 1984	Norwich City	A	0–1	15,937	
3 March 1984	Ipswich Town	A	3–0	17,384	Hilton, Cottee, Butcher (og)
10 March 1984	Wolverhampton Wanderers	H	1–1	18,111	Cottee
17 March 1984	Leicester City	A	1–4	13,533	Stewart
31 March 1984	Queens Park Rangers	H	2–2	21,099	Cottee, Pike
7 April 1984	Liverpool	A	0–6	38,369	
14 April 1984	Sunderland	H	0–1	16,558	
17 April 1984	Luton Town	H	3–1	15,430	Martin, Cottee (2)
21 April 1984	Southampton	A	0–2	20,846	
28 April 1984	Manchester United	A	0–0	44,124	
5 May 1984	Aston Villa	H	0–1	17,393	
7 May 1984	Arsenal	A	3–3	33,347	Hilton, Whitton (2)
12 May 1984	Nottingham Forest	H	1–2	18,458	Stewart
14 May 1984	Everton	H	0–1	25,452	

=== FA Cup ===
Round	Date	Opponent	Venue	Result	Attendance	Goalscorers
R3	7 January 1984	Wigan Athletic	H	1–0	16,000	Stewart
R4	28 January 1984	Crystal Palace	A	1–1	27,590	Swindlehurst
R4 Replay	31 January 1984	Crystal Palace	H	2–0	27,127	Barnes, Pike
R5	18 February 1984	Birmingham City	A	0–3	29,570	

=== League Cup ===
Round	Date	Opponent	Venue	Result	Attendance	Goalscorers
R2 First Leg	4 October 1983	Bury	A	2–1	15,894	Orr, Goddard
R2 Second Leg	25 October 1983	Bury	H	10–0 (12–1 on agg)	10,896	Stewart, Martin, Devonshire (2), Cottee (4), Brooking (2)
R3	8 November 1983	Brighton and Hove Albion	H	1–0	17,082	Swindlehurst
R4	30 November 1983	Everton	H	2–2	19,702	Mountfield (og) 34', Pike 87'
R4	6 December 1983	Everton	A	0–2	21,607	

== Squad ==
Note: Flags indicate national team as defined under FIFA eligibility rules; some limited exceptions apply. Players may hold more than one non-FIFA nationality.

Pos.	Nation	Player
MF	ENG	Paul Allen
MF	ENG	Bobby Barnes
DF	ENG	Billy Bonds (captain)
MF	ENG	Trevor Brooking
DF	ENG	Paul Brush
FW	ENG	Tony Cottee
MF	ENG	Alan Devonshire
MF	ENG	Alan Dickens
MF	ENG	Warren Donald
FW	ENG	Paul Goddard
DF	ENG	Paul Hilton

Pos.	Nation	Player
DF	ENG	Frank Lampard
DF	ENG	Alvin Martin
DF	SCO	Neil Orr
GK	ENG	Phil Parkes
MF	ENG	Geoff Pike
DF	SCO	Ray Stewart
FW	ENG	Dave Swindlehurst
DF	ENG	Steve Walford
FW	ENG	Steve Whitton
