= Mark Ward (footballer, born 1962) =

English footballer (born 1962)

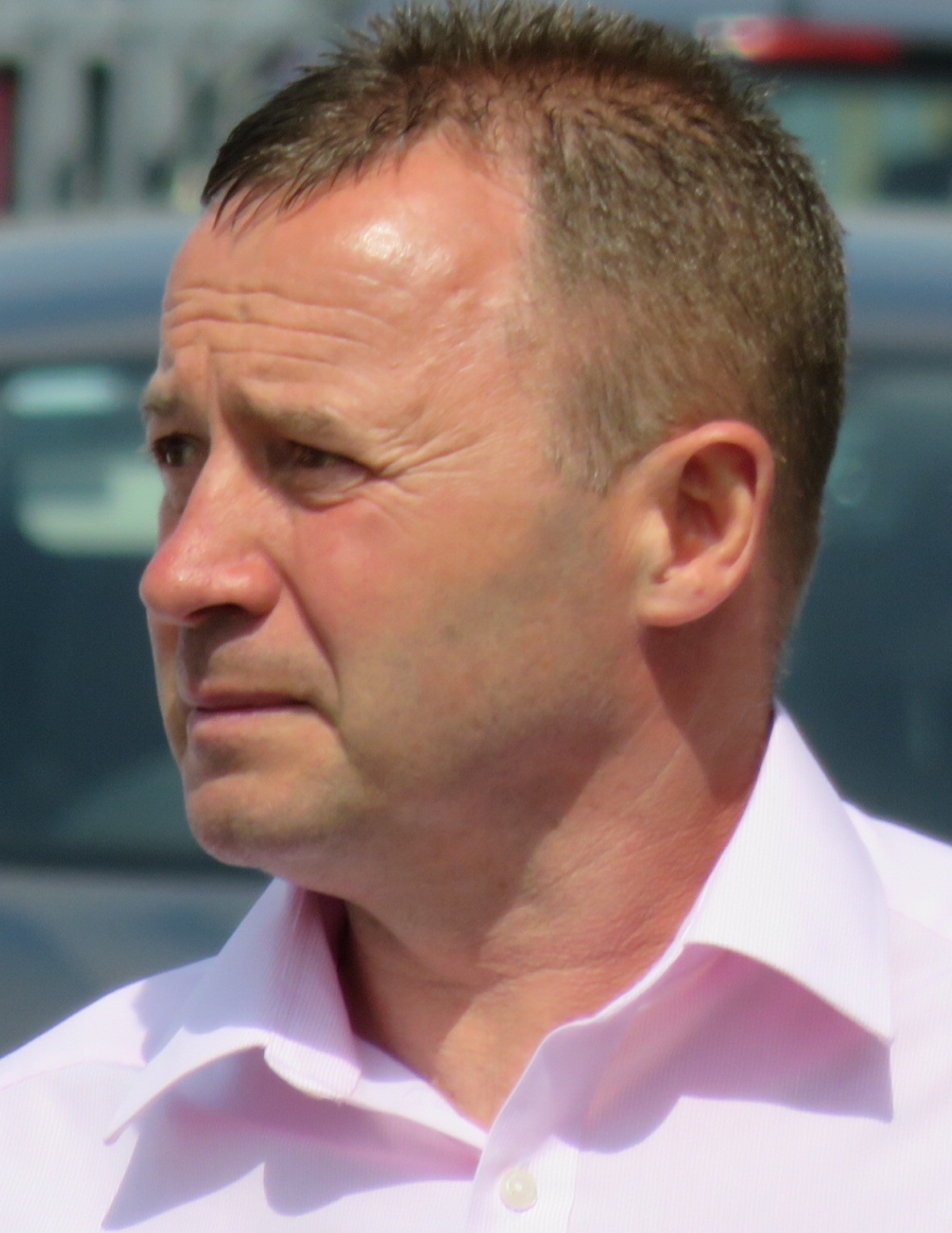
- Ward in 2016

Personal information
- Full name: Mark William Ward
- Date of birth: 10 October 1962 (age 64)
- Place of birth: Huyton, England
- Height: 5 ft 6 in (1.68 m)
- Position: Right winger

Youth career
- 1977–1980: Everton

Senior career*
Years	Team	Apps	(Gls)
1980–1981	Everton	0	(0)
1981–1983	Northwich Victoria		
1983–1985	Oldham Athletic	84	(12)
1985–1989	West Ham United	165	(12)
1989–1991	Manchester City	55	(14)
1991–1994	Everton	83	(6)
1994–1996	Birmingham City	63	(7)
1996	Huddersfield Town	8	(0)
1996	Ayr United	1	(0)
1997	Wigan Athletic	5	(0)
1997	Dundee	1	(0)
1998	Valur	5	(0)
- Altrincham
1999	Leigh RMI		
Total		470	(51)

International career
1983	England semi-pro	1	(0)

Managerial career
- 2000–2001: Altrincham
- * Club domestic league appearances and goals

Mark William Ward (born 10 October 1962) is an English former footballer.

== Playing career ==
Ward was born in Huyton, Lancashire, on 10 October 1962, the second eldest of seven children born to Billy and Irene Ward. His father's family originated from County Cork in Ireland. His father was a casual labourer and an accomplished sportsman, and had played reserve team football for Liverpool in the 1953–54 season. Ward was spotted by Everton at an early age, and joined the club's youth team before signing schoolboy forms in 1977. He then signed apprentice forms in 1979. He developed sciatica, but recovered and managed to score the winning goal against PSV Eindhoven in the final of the under-19 youth tournament in Groningen; he was also voted as the player-of-the-tournament. His success in the competition won him a professional contract with Everton. However, he was released without ever playing a first team game at Goodison Park after manager Gordon Lee told him he was too small to play top-flight football; Lee was sacked by Everton just hours after releasing Ward.

Ward signed a two-year contract with Northwich Victoria of the Alliance Premier League after impressing in a trial game, and the club also found him a job in a bakery. He established himself in the first team and scored the winning goal against Football League side Chester City in the first round of the FA Cup at Drill Field in the 1982–83 season. He also scored the winning goal past Dagenham in the semi-finals of the FA Trophy, to book John King's "Vics" a place at Wembley Stadium in the final. They lost 2–1 to Telford United in the final, and Ward spent most of the game as little more than a spectator after being taken out by left-back Tony Turner in the opening stages of the match. He made his only appearance for the England national semi-pro team on 4 June 1983, as a substitute in a 2–1 win over Scotland in the Four Nations Tournament.

He signed with Second Division club Oldham Athletic, with manager Joe Royle authorising an initial £9,500 transfer fee that would rise to £34,500 after Ward played 25 games for Oldham. He made his debut against Brighton & Hove Albion at Boundary Park on the opening day of the 1983–84 season on 27 August and scored the only goal of the game with a diving header. He went on to feature in the "Latics" every game of the 1983–84 and 1984–85 seasons, scoring 12 goals in 92 league and cup appearances.

Ward was signed by West Ham United manager John Lyall for a £250,000 fee in August 1985. He was signed to replace Paul Allen, who had been sold to Tottenham Hotspur for £400,000 earlier in the summer. He was ever-present on the right wing in his first season, as they finished third in the First Division. However, in subsequent seasons, star strikers Frank McAvennie and Tony Cottee left and West Ham were relegated at the end of 1988–89.

In December 1989, Ward signed for newly promoted Manchester City, who had just appointed Howard Kendall as manager after falling into the relegation zone. Ian Bishop and Trevor Morley signed for West Ham in exchange. Bizarrely, Ward's first six games for City included four against Millwall. City beat them in the league on 30 December 1989 but drew twice with them in the FA Cup before losing the second replay on 15 January 1990. City rose to finish 14th, with Ward scoring his first three goals for City in consecutive games in April.

Playing mainly on the left wing, Ward only missed two games in 1990–91, scoring 13 league and cup goals as City finished fifth. He scored both goals when City beat Sheffield United in the league on 19 January 1991, and then repeated the feat three days later to knock Sheffield United out of the Full Members Cup.

In the summer of 1991, he signed for Everton, rejoining Kendall who had moved in November 1990. Ward stayed for three seasons before moving down the divisions to play for Birmingham City (where he was a player-coach), Huddersfield Town, Ayr United, Wigan Athletic, Dundee, Valur, Altrincham, and Leigh RMI. Whilst at Birmingham he was part of the side that won the 1995 Football League Trophy Final.

== Imprisonment ==
After the end of his football career, he became involved in the supply of cocaine in Liverpool. He was arrested after 4.0 kg (8.8 lb) of cocaine were found during a raid at a house in Prescot, Merseyside, in May 2005. In October 2005, he was jailed for eight years. He was released from HM Prison Kirkham in May 2009, having served four years in Kirkham and in HM Prison Liverpool.

== Personal life ==
Ward married Jane Spruce in January 1983. They have one daughter.

== Career statistics ==
Appearances and goals by club, season and competition
Club	Season	League			FA Cup		Other		Total	
Club	Season	Division	Apps	Goals	Apps	Goals	Apps	Goals	Apps	Goals
Everton	1980–81	First Division	0	0	0	0	0	0	0	0
Oldham Athletic	1983–84	Second Division	42	6	1	0	3	0	46	6
Oldham Athletic	1984–85	Second Division	42	6	2	0	2	0	46	6
Oldham Athletic	Total		84	12	3	0	5	0	92	12
West Ham United	1985–86	First Division	42	3	7	0	3	0	52	3
West Ham United	1986–87	First Division	37	1	5	0	7	2	49	3
West Ham United	1987–88	First Division	37	1	2	0	3	0	42	1
West Ham United	1988–89	First Division	30	2	3	0	8	0	41	2
West Ham United	1989–90	Second Division	19	5	0	0	6	0	25	5
West Ham United	Total		165	12	17	0	27	2	209	14
Manchester City	1989–90	First Division	19	3	3	0	0	0	22	3
Manchester City	1990–91	First Division	36	11	3	0	6	2	45	13
Manchester City	Total		55	14	6	0	6	2	67	16
Everton	1991–92	First Division	37	4	2	0	3	0	42	4
Everton	1992–93	Premier League	19	1	0	0	0	0	19	1
Everton	1993–94	Premier League	27	1	2	0	4	1	33	2
Everton	Total		83	6	4	0	7	1	94	7
Birmingham City	1993–94	First Division	9	1	0	0	0	0	9	1
Birmingham City	1994–95	Second Division	41	3	4	0	10	1	55	4
Birmingham City	1995–96	First Division	13	3	0	0	5	0	18	3
Birmingham City	Total		63	7	4	0	15	1	82	8
Huddersfield Town	1995–96	First Division	8	0	0	0	0	0	8	0
Wigan Athletic	1996–97	Third Division	5	0	0	0	0	0	5	0
Career total			463	51	34	0	60	6	557	57

== Honours ==
Northwich Victoria

- FA Trophy runner-up: 1982–83

Birmingham City

- Football League Second Division: 1994–95
- Football League Trophy: 1994–95

Individual

- PFA Team of the Year: 1994–95 Second Division
