= 1992–93 Everton F.C. season =

English football club season

Everton
1992–93 season
- Chairman: David Marsh
- Manager: Howard Kendall
- Stadium: Goodison Park
- FA Premier League: 13th
- FA Cup: Third Round
- League Cup: Fourth Round
- Top goalscorer: League: Tony Cottee (12); All: Tony Cottee (13)
- Average home league attendance: 20,457
Home colours	Away colours	Third colours

During the 1992–93 English football season, Everton F.C. competed in the inaugural season of the FA Premier League.

== Season summary ==
1992–93 was the first year of the new FA Premier League, which took over from the Football League First Division as the highest division of English football. However Everton finished 13th, their lowest league finish for over a decade, and pressure grew upon Howard Kendall.

== Final league table ==
Pos	Team	Pld	W	D	L	GF	GA	GD	Pts
11	Chelsea	42	14	14	14	51	54	−3	56
12	Wimbledon	42	14	12	16	56	55	+1	54
13	Everton	42	15	8	19	53	55	−2	53
14	Sheffield United	42	14	10	18	54	53	+1	52
15	Coventry City	42	13	13	16	52	57	−5	52

Source: Premier League
Rules for classification: 1) points; 2) goal difference; 3) number of goals scored.

== Results ==
Everton's score comes first

=== Legend ===
Win	Draw	Loss

=== FA Premier League ===
Date	Opponent	Venue	Result	Attendance	Scorers
15 August 1992	Sheffield Wednesday	H	1–1	27,687	Horne
19 August 1992	Manchester United	A	3–0	31,901	Beardsley, Warzycha, Johnston
22 August 1992	Norwich City	A	1–1	14,150	Beardsley
25 August 1992	Aston Villa	H	1–0	22,372	Johnston
29 August 1992	Wimbledon	H	0–0	18,118	
5 September 1992	Tottenham Hotspur	A	1–2	26,503	Beardsley
12 September 1992	Manchester United	H	0–2	30,002	
15 September 1992	Blackburn Rovers	A	3–2	19,583	Cottee (2), Ebbrell
19 September 1992	Crystal Palace	H	0–2	18,080	
26 September 1992	Leeds United	A	0–2	27,915	
4 October 1992	Oldham Athletic	A	0–1	13,013	
17 October 1992	Coventry City	H	1–1	17,587	Beagrie
24 October 1992	Arsenal	A	0–2	28,052	
31 October 1992	Manchester City	H	1–3	20,242	Brightwell (own goal)
7 November 1992	Nottingham Forest	A	1–0	20,941	Rideout
21 November 1992	Chelsea	H	0–1	17,418	
28 November 1992	Ipswich Town	A	0–1	18,034	
7 December 1992	Liverpool	H	2–1	35,826	Johnston, Beardsley
12 December 1992	Sheffield United	A	0–1	16,266	
19 December 1992	Southampton	H	2–1	14,051	Beardsley (pen), Rideout
26 December 1992	Middlesbrough	H	2–2	24,391	Rideout, Beardsley (pen)
28 December 1992	Queens Park Rangers	A	2–4	14,802	Barlow (2)
9 January 1993	Crystal Palace	A	2–0	13,227	Jackson, Beardsley
16 January 1993	Leeds United	H	2–0	21,031	Cottee (2)
26 January 1993	Wimbledon	A	3–1	3,039	Cottee (2), Snodin
30 January 1993	Norwich City	H	0–1	20,301	
6 February 1993	Sheffield Wednesday	A	1–3	24,979	Cottee
10 February 1993	Tottenham Hotspur	H	1–2	16,164	Sansom
20 February 1993	Aston Villa	A	1–2	32,913	Beardsley (pen)
27 February 1993	Oldham Athletic	H	2–2	18,025	Beardsley (pen), Barlow
3 March 1993	Blackburn Rovers	H	2–1	18,086	Hendry (own goal), Cottee
7 March 1993	Coventry City	A	1–0	11,285	Ward
10 March 1993	Chelsea	A	1–2	12,739	Kenny
13 March 1993	Nottingham Forest	H	3–0	21,271	Cottee (2), Hinchcliffe
20 March 1993	Liverpool	A	0–1	44,619	
24 March 1993	Ipswich Town	H	3–0	15,638	Barlow, Jackson, Cottee
10 April 1993	Middlesbrough	A	2–1	16,627	Watson, Preki
12 April 1993	Queens Park Rangers	H	3–5	19,057	Cottee, Barlow, Preki
17 April 1993	Southampton	A	0–0	16,911	
1 May 1993	Arsenal	H	0–0	19,044	
4 May 1993	Sheffield United	H	0–2	15,197	
8 May 1993	Manchester City	A	5–2	25,180	Jackson, Beagrie (2), Beardsley, Preki

=== FA Cup ===
Round	Date	Opponent	Venue	Result	Attendance	Goalscorers
R3	2 January 1993	Wimbledon	A	0–0	7,818	
R3R	12 January 1993	Wimbledon	H	1–2	15,293	Watson

=== League Cup ===
Round	Date	Opponent	Venue	Result	Attendance	Goalscorers
R2 First Leg	22 September 1992	Rotherham United	A	0–1	7,736	
R2 Second Leg	7 October 1992	Rotherham United	H	3–0 (won 3–1 on agg)	10,302	Rideout (2), Cottee (pen)
R3	28 October 1992	Wimbledon	H	0–0	9,541	
R3R	10 November 1992	Wimbledon	A	1–0	3,686	Beardsley
R4	2 December 1992	Chelsea	H	2–2	14,457	Barlow 25', Beardsley 36'
R4R	16 December 1992	Chelsea	A	0–1	19,496	

== First-team squad ==
Note: Flags indicate national team as defined under FIFA eligibility rules; some limited exceptions apply. Players may hold more than one non-FIFA nationality.

Pos.	Nation	Player
GK	WAL	Neville Southall
GK	AUS	Jason Kearton
DF	ENG	Gary Ablett
DF	ENG	Alan Harper
DF	ENG	Andy Hinchcliffe
DF	ENG	Matt Jackson
DF	ENG	Iain Jenkins
DF	ENG	Martin Keown
DF	ENG	Neil Moore
DF	ENG	Kenny Sansom
DF	ENG	David Unsworth
DF	ENG	Dave Watson (captain)
MF	ENG	Peter Beagrie
MF	ENG	John Doolan

Pos.	Nation	Player
MF	ENG	John Ebbrell
MF	ENG	Paul Holmes
MF	ENG	Billy Kenny
MF	ENG	Chris Priest
MF	ENG	Ian Snodin
MF	ENG	Mark Ward
MF	WAL	Barry Horne
MF	POL	Robert Warzycha
MF	YUG	Preki
FW	ENG	Stuart Barlow
FW	ENG	Peter Beardsley
FW	ENG	Tony Cottee
FW	ENG	Paul Rideout
FW	SCO	Mo Johnston

== Transfers ==
=== In ===
- (Federal Republic of Yugoslavia) Preki - (United States) St. Louis Storm, £100,000, 1992
- (England) Paul Rideout - (Scotland) Rangers F.C., £583,000, 1992
- (Wales) Barry Horne - (England) Southampton F.C 1992
- (England) Kenny Sansom - (England) Coventry City F.C., 1993
- (England) Paul Holmes - (England) Birmingham City F.C., 1993

=== Out ===
- (Wales) Kevin Ratcliffe - (Scotland) Dundee F.C., 1992
- (England) Martin Keown - (England) Arsenal F.C., £3,00m, 1993
- (England) Kenny Sansom - (England) Brentford F.C., 1993
- (Scotland) Pat Nevin - (England) Tranmere Rovers, £450,000, 1992
- (England) Kenny Sansom - (England) Coventry City F.C., 1993
