= Martin Keown =

Former English footballer, coach, and scout

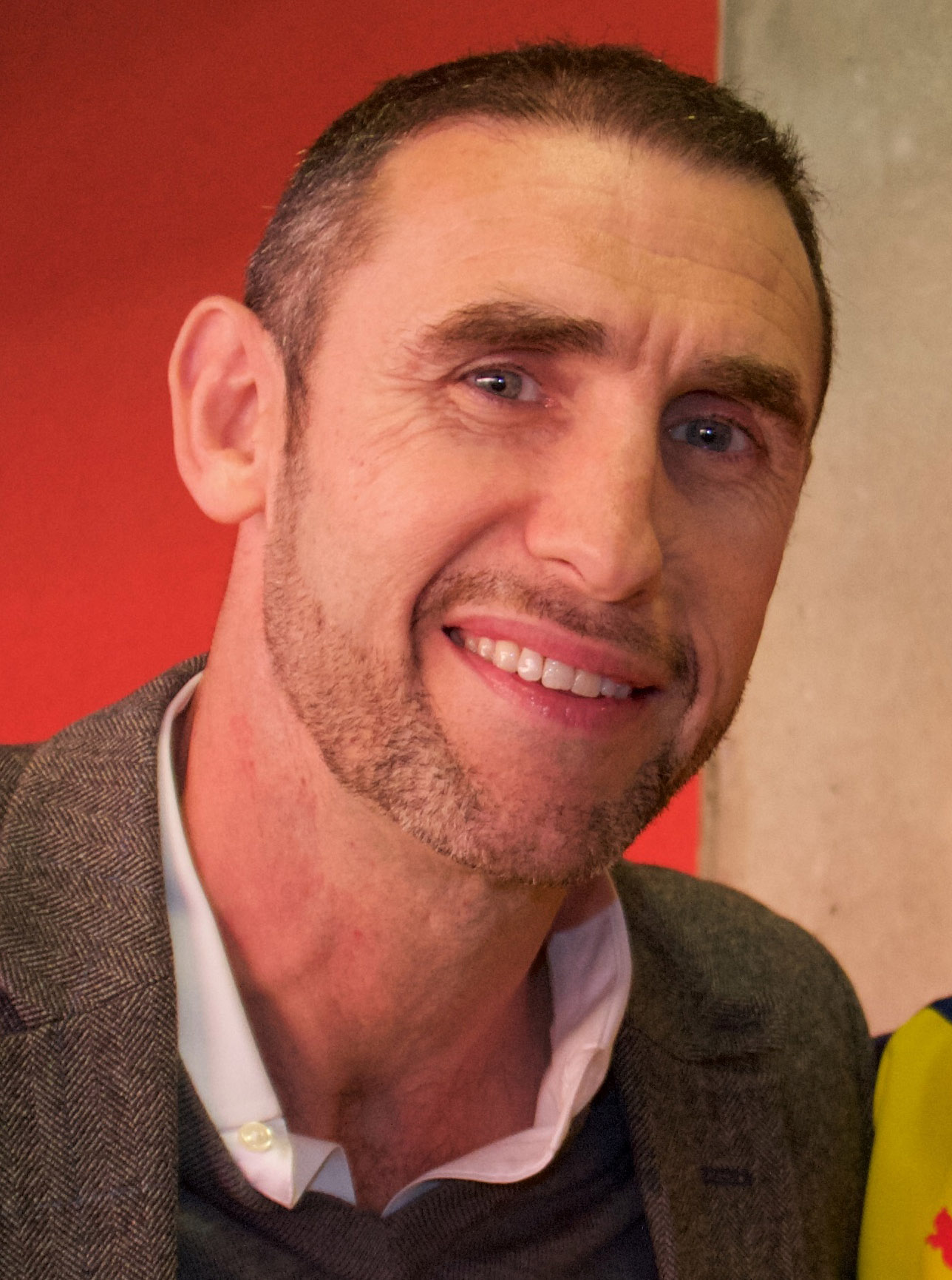
- Keown in 2015

Personal information
- Full name: Martin Raymond Keown
- Date of birth: 24 July 1966 (age 60)
- Place of birth: Oxford, England
- Height: 6 ft 1 in (1.85 m)
- Position: Centre back

Youth career
- 1980–1984: Arsenal

Senior career*
Years	Team	Apps	(Gls)
1984–1986	Arsenal	22	(0)
1985	→ Brighton & Hove Albion (loan)	23	(1)
1986–1989	Aston Villa	112	(3)
1989–1993	Everton	96	(0)
1993–2004	Arsenal	310	(4)
2004–2005	Leicester City	17	(0)
2005	Reading	5	(0)
2012	Wembley	0	(0)
Total		585	(8)

International career
1983	England U17	3	(0)
1983	England Youth	1	(0)
1987–1988	England U21	8	(0)
1991	England B	1	(0)
1992–2002	England	43	(2)
- * Club domestic league appearances and goals

Martin Raymond Keown (/ˈkiːoʊn/ KEE-ohn; born 24 July 1966) is an English football pundit and former professional footballer. A defender, he played from 1984 to 2005, notably in the Premier League for Arsenal, where he made over 400 appearances for the club and won ten honours.

Keown also played for Brighton & Hove Albion, Aston Villa, Everton, Leicester City and Reading. He made his England debut in 1992 against France and went on to win 43 caps for the national side over the next ten years, gradually forming a respected defensive partnership with Arsenal teammate Tony Adams at both club and international level. Keown represented England at four major international football finals: the 1998 and 2002 World Cups, as well as Euro 1992 and Euro 2000.

He is now a part-time scout and coach for Arsenal, as well as a pundit for the BBC and BT Sport. He came out of retirement in 2012 and briefly played for Combined Counties League Premier Division side Wembley in their FA Cup fixtures.

== Club career ==
=== Arsenal ===
A centre back from Oxford, Keown played for local sides and his local Gaelic football team as a boy, before joining Arsenal on a schoolboy contract in 1980, though he made his professional debut on loan at Brighton & Hove Albion in 1984. His debut for Arsenal came on 23 November 1985, when Don Howe was still their manager, and they drew 0–0 with West Bromwich Albion at The Hawthorns. He played 22 league games that season, mostly alongside Tommy Caton or David O'Leary, but when George Graham was appointed manager on 14 May 1986, he decided that Keown was not part of his plans to try to turn Arsenal into league title contenders and on 9 June 1986 he joined Aston Villa for £125,000. Graham offered him £50 a week less than Keown wanted and stated in 1993: "It seemed crazy that they wouldn't agree and although I didn't want to leave and they didn't want me to go, it became a matter of principle."

=== Aston Villa ===
Keown signed for Villa after a season in which they had narrowly avoided relegation to the Second Division, a mere four years after being European Cup winners and five years since being league champions. Manager Graham Turner was under a lot of pressure, and after their dismal form continued into the 1986–87 season he was sacked on 14 September 1986 and succeeded by Billy McNeill. Keown appeared in 36 league games that season, but he was unable to save Villa from finishing bottom of the First Division and being relegated after 12 successive seasons in the top flight.

Graham Taylor then arrived at Villa Park to succeed the sacked McNeill, and Keown was very much part of his rebuilding plans as he missed just two league games and scored three goals as Villa finished second in the Second Division and won promotion back to the top flight at the first attempt. Keown helped the team secure its top flight status the following season, but was sold to Everton on 7 August 1989, just before the start of the 1989–90 season, for a fee of £750,000.

=== Everton ===
Keown had a fine start to his Everton career, and they topped the table for a while in late autumn and there was hope that they could win the league title, but their form ebbed away after Christmas and they managed only a sixth-place finish. Keown managed 20 league appearances that campaign and a slightly better 24 in 1990–91, when Colin Harvey was replaced by Howard Kendall as manager in November. He missed just three league games in 1991–92, which brought another mid-table finish, and he played just 13 more league games for the Toffees before accepting a £2 million return to Arsenal in February 1993.

=== Return to Arsenal ===
Keown did not feature in Arsenal's historic FA Cup and League Cup double of 1993 due to being cup-tied. However, he did manage 16 Premier League appearances, playing in a number of positions. He and Andy Linighan were high quality defenders competing alongside Steve Bould and captain Tony Adams in the centre of one of the best English league defences of the 1990s, and Keown also filled in at right-back, left-back, and central midfield, demonstrating a versatility that would be called upon for several seasons.

Keown missed out on Arsenal's Cup Winners' Cup Final win over Parma the following year through injury although he did play a part in the overall campaign after appearing in earlier rounds. However, he did start the final the following season when Arsenal were narrowly beaten by Real Zaragoza after extra time.

He rarely missed a game in his first four full seasons back at Highbury, and in 1996-97, Arsène Wenger's first season at the club, he made 28 appearances as a defensive midfielder. The season ended painfully when he broke his shoulder playing for England in the 1997 Tournoi de France, ruling him out for five months. As a result, in the 1997–98 double winning campaign, 31-year-old Keown played just 18 times in the Premier League, employed entirely as a centre back. The season saw him claim the first two major trophies of his career after well over a decade of waiting.

In the following seasons, Keown became an integral part of Arsène Wenger's team. In a 2000–01 UEFA Champions League tie against FC Shakhtar Donetsk, Keown memorably scored two goals in the last five minutes to help Arsenal come back from 2–1 down to win 3–2. He won a second Double with the club in 2002, and remained a first team regular until the end of the 2002–03 season, when the Gunners won their ninth FA Cup but blew the chance of a unique fourth double due to a late loss of form in the league.

On 21 September 2003, during Arsenal and Manchester United's match at Old Trafford, Manchester United were awarded a late penalty with the score at 0–0. After Ruud van Nistelrooy's penalty hit the bar, Keown and Ray Parlour confronted van Nistelrooy, and Keown hit him on the back of the head. After the final whistle, Keown was then involved in a post-match melee; he was subsequently fined £20,000 and suspended for three games for his part in what is now known as the "Battle of Old Trafford". Arsenal would go on to end the 2003–04 season as unbeaten champions. Keown made 10 league appearances during the season, before being released on a free transfer in the summer of 2004 after 11 years in his second spell at the club.

=== Later career ===
He signed for Leicester City, but left after less than six months and signed for Reading in January 2005 until the end of the season, after which he retired. As part of a publicity stunt Keown, and a number of other former professional players, including Ray Parlour, Danny Dichio, Jaime Moreno, Graeme Le Saux, Claudio Caniggia and Brian McBride, joined non-league Wembley in order to take part in their 2012–13 FA Cup run. Wembley were knocked out in a replay by Uxbridge after beating Langford in the previous round.

== International career ==
Keown played U16 and U18 for England. When it was learned that his mother was Irish and his father Northern Irish, Jack Charlton made an inquiry as to his availability to play for the Republic of Ireland but Keown chose to represent the country of his birth. He was also eligible to play for Northern Ireland as his father was from County Fermanagh. He made his England debut in 1992 against France. With an injury to Mark Wright he was called up into England's squad for UEFA Euro 1992, and played in all three of England's matches.

Keown's early ascension to the England team under Graham Taylor did not continue under Terry Venables, who ignored him completely. Keown earned a recall from Glenn Hoddle in 1997, and went to the 1998 World Cup, but did not play. Keown became a regular under Kevin Keegan (captaining the side against Finland) and played in two of England's Euro 2000 matches.

By the time Sven-Göran Eriksson became manager, Keown's age was starting to count against him, though he went to the 2002 World Cup, again as a non-playing squad member. Keown retired from international football the day after England's exit at the hands of Brazil. In all he played 43 times for England, scoring two goals.

== Management and career outside football ==
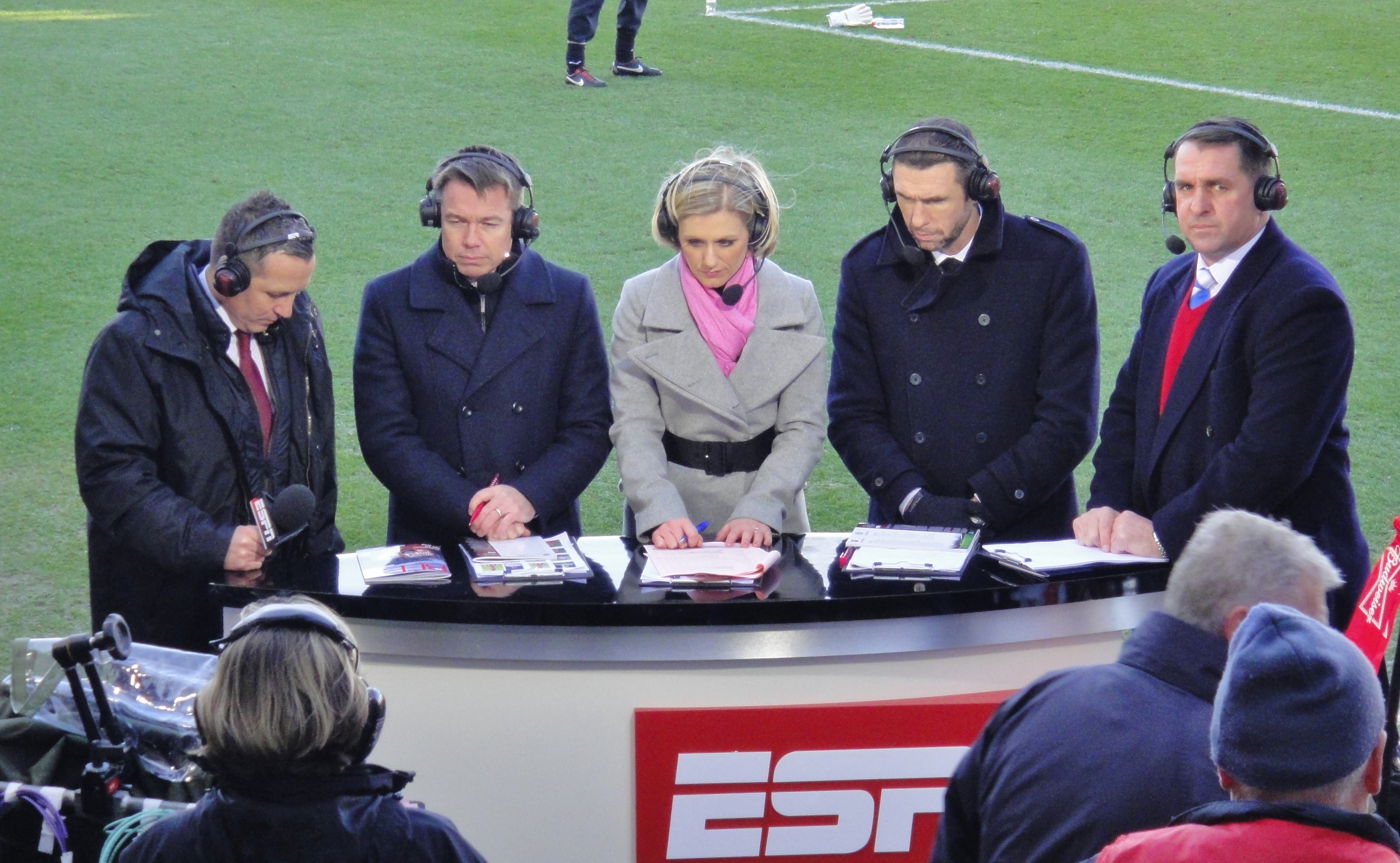
Keown (second from right) with ESPN in 2013

Keown joined the coaching staff of Newbury in August 2005, but is now coaching back at former club Arsenal where he is taking his coaching badges. Former Arsenal manager Terry Neill identified him as a key figure behind the success of Arsenal's inexperienced "new-look" defence (which the team resorted to after ongoing injury problems in the 2005–06 season, notably setting a record for minutes played without conceding in the Champions League). In 2007–08 Keown was also a coach for the Oxford University Blues Football team on a part-time basis.

Keown regularly appears as a pundit on the BBC's football coverage and Match of the Day, as well as covering the Champions League for Irish broadcaster TV3. He was also working for ESPN UK during the 2011 Emirates Cup.

== Career statistics ==
=== Club ===
Appearances and goals by club, season and competition
Club	Season	League			FA Cup		League Cup		Europe		Other		Total	
Club	Season	Division	Apps	Goals	Apps	Goals	Apps	Goals	Apps	Goals	Apps	Goals	Apps	Goals
Arsenal	1983–84	First Division	0	0	0	0	0	0	—		—		0	0
Arsenal	1984–85	First Division	0	0	0	0	0	0	—		—		0	0
Arsenal	1985–86	First Division	22	0	5	0	—		—		—		27	0
Arsenal	Total		22	0	5	0	0	0	—		—		27	0
Brighton & Hove Albion (loan)	1984–85	Second Division	16	0	—		—		—		—		16	0
Brighton & Hove Albion (loan)	1985–86	Second Division	7	1	—		2	1	—		2 (Note: Appearances in Full Members' Cup)	1	11	3
Brighton & Hove Albion (loan)	Total		23	1	—		2	1	—		2	1	27	3
Aston Villa	1986–87	First Division	36	0	2	0	4	0	—		0	0	42	0
Aston Villa	1987–88	Second Division	42	3	2	0	4	0	—		0	0	48	3
Aston Villa	1988–89	First Division	34	0	2	0	4	0	—		2	0	42	0
Aston Villa	Total		112	3	6	0	12	0	—		2	0	132	3
Everton	1989–90	First Division	20	0	4	0	2	0	—		—		26	0
Everton	1990–91	First Division	24	0	5	0	1	0	—		5	0	35	0
Everton	1991–92	First Division	39	0	2	0	4	0	—		1	0	46	0
Everton	1992–93	Premier League	13	0	2	0	4	0	—		—		19	0
Everton	Total		96	0	13	0	11	0	—		6	0	126	0
Arsenal	1992–93	Premier League	16	0	—		—		—		—		16	0
Arsenal	1993–94	Premier League	33	0	3	0	3	0	7 (Note: Appearances in UEFA Cup Winners' Cup)	0	1 (Note: Appearance in Charity Shield)	0	47	0
Arsenal	1994–95	Premier League	31	1	2	0	5	0	5	0	1 (Note: Appearance in European Super Cup)	0	44	1
Arsenal	1995–96	Premier League	34	0	2	0	5	1	—		—		41	1
Arsenal	1996–97	Premier League	33	1	3	0	3	0	2 (Note: Appearances in UEFA Cup)	0	—		41	1
Arsenal	1997–98	Premier League	18	0	7	0	2	0	0	0	—		27	0
Arsenal	1998–99	Premier League	34	1	4	0	0	0	5 (Note: Appearances in UEFA Champions League)	1	1	0	44	2
Arsenal	1999–2000	Premier League	27	1	2	0	0	0	9 (Note: Five appearances in UEFA Champions League, four appearances in UEFA Cup)	0	1	0	39	1
Arsenal	2000–01	Premier League	28	0	2	0	0	0	9	2	—		39	2
Arsenal	2001–02	Premier League	22	0	4	0	2	0	6	0	—		34	0
Arsenal	2002–03	Premier League	24	0	5	0	0	0	5	0	1	0	35	0
Arsenal	2003–04	Premier League	10	0	1	0	3	0	1	0	0	0	15	0
Arsenal	Total		310	4	35	0	23	1	49	3	5	0	422	8
Leicester City	2004–05	Championship	17	0	1	0	0	0	—		—		18	0
Reading	2004–05	Championship	5	0	—		—		—		—		5	0
Career total			585	8	60	0	48	2	49	3	15	1	757	14

=== International ===
Appearances and goals by national team and year
National team	Year	Apps	Goals
England	1992	9	1
England	1993	2	0
England	1997	4	0
England	1998	4	0
England	1999	8	0
England	2000	9	1
England	2001	4	0
England	2002	3	0
Total		43	2

Scores and results list England's goal tally first, score column indicates score after each Keown goal.

List of international goals scored by Martin Keown
No.	Date	Venue	Cap	Opponent	Score	Result	Competition
1	25 March 1992	Stadion Evžena Rošického, Prague, Czechoslovakia	2	Czechoslovakia	2–2	2–2	Friendly
2	3 June 2000	National Stadium, Ta' Qali, Malta	30	Malta	1–0	2–1	Friendly

== Honours ==
Aston Villa

- Football League Second Division runner-up: 1987–88

Everton

- Full Members' Cup runner-up: 1990–91

Arsenal

- Premier League: 1997–98, 2001–02, 2003–04
- FA Cup: 1997–98, 2001–02, 2002–03; runner-up: 2000–01
- FA Charity/Community Shield: 1998, 1999, 2002
- European/UEFA Cup Winners' Cup: 1993–94; runner-up: 1994–95
- UEFA Cup runner-up: 1999–2000

Individual

- Arsenal Player of the Season: 1995−96

== Personal life ==
Keown lives in and around Oxford with his wife Nicola. Keown's son Niall is also a footballer.
