= Tony Cottee =

English footballer (b. 1965)

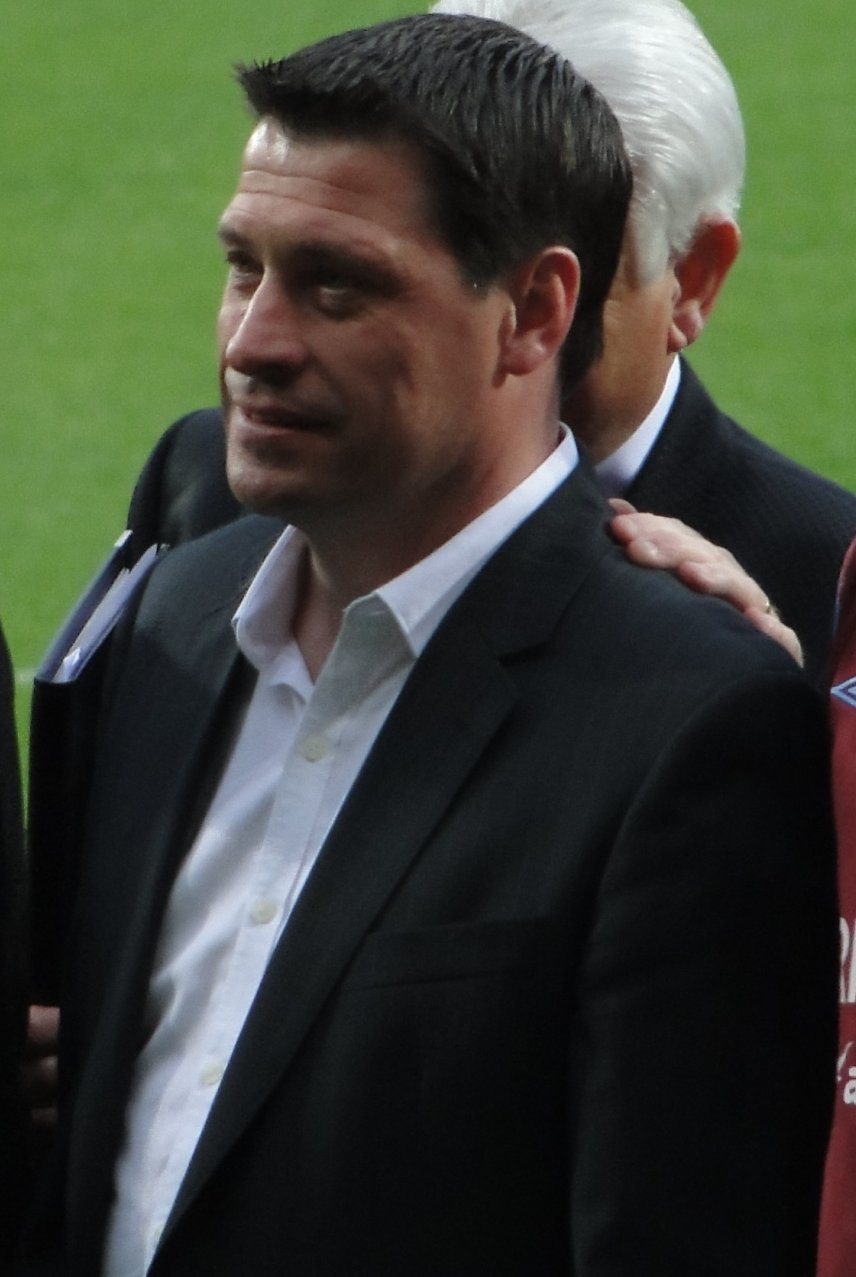
- Cottee at a testimonial for Tony Carr in 2010

Personal information
- Full name: Antony Richard Cottee
- Date of birth: 11 July 1965 (age 61)
- Place of birth: Forest Gate, London, England
- Height: 5 ft 7 in (1.70 m)
- Position: Striker

Senior career*
Years	Team	Apps	(Gls)
1982–1988	West Ham United	212	(92)
1988–1994	Everton	184	(72)
1994–1996	West Ham United	67	(23)
1996–1997	Selangor	24	(14)
1997–2000	Leicester City	85	(27)
1997	→ Birmingham City (loan)	4	(1)
2000	Norwich City	7	(1)
2000–2001	Barnet	16	(9)
2001	Millwall	2	(0)
Total		601	(239)

International career
1982	England Youth	3	(1)
1984–1987	England U21	8	(1)
1986–1989	England	7	(0)

Managerial career
- 2000–2001: Barnet
- * Club domestic league appearances and goals

Antony Richard Cottee (born 11 July 1965) is an English former professional footballer and manager who now works as a television football commentator.

As a player, he was a striker from 1982 until 2001, notably playing in the top flight of English football for West Ham United, Everton and Leicester City. He was capped seven times by England, and played in the Football League for Birmingham City, Norwich City and Millwall. He also had a spell in Malaysia with Selangor and spent a season as player-manager of Barnet.

He played in Everton's 1989 FA Cup final defeat to Liverpool, and won the League Cup with Leicester City in 2000. His final career tally was 579 league games and 226 goals. In all competitions, he played 712 games and 293 goals. He exceeded his ambition to score 200 league goals in his career, but fell just short of his target of 300 goals in all competitions. Still, he was one of the most prolific goalscorers that English football saw during the 1980s and 1990s.

== Playing career ==
=== West Ham United ===
Born in Forest Gate, London, Cottee began his career at West Ham, where he made his first team debut in the First Division against Tottenham Hotspur on 1 January 1983, at the age of 17, scoring in the process. He played a total of eight games in the 1982–83 season, scoring five goals. He established himself in the first team during the 1983–84 season, when still only 18, and scored 15 times in the league. He did even better in 1984–85, when he scored 17 First Division goals. By the age of 20, he had already managed an impressive 37 league goals.

He was a prolific scorer in first spell at West Ham, where he was voted the PFA Young Player of the Year in 1986, the year where West Ham finished third (their highest league finish to date) and came just four points away from the title. He scored 20 times in the league during that season, though his strike partner Frank McAvennie did even better with 26 league goals. Still, their 46-goal strike partnership was the most prolific in the league that season.

1986–87 saw Cottee score 22 league goals – which would be the highest of his career. However, Frank McAvennie alongside him could only manage seven league goals that season and this contributed to a downturn in West Ham's form as they finished 15th. Cottee managed a further 13 league goals in 1987–88, but McAvennie had been sold to Celtic early in the season and the failure of manager John Lyall to find an adequate replacement contributed to West Ham disappointing in the league again, finishing 16th. By this time, the 23-year-old Cottee had already managed 212 league games and 92 goals for Hammers.

=== Everton ===
Cottee briefly became the most expensive player to be signed by a British club when on 2 August 1988 he joined Everton in a £2.2 million deal (a fee eclipsed by Ian Rush's return to Liverpool from Juventus later that month).

He made his Everton debut on 27 August 1988, the opening day of the 1988–89 First Division campaign, in a 4–0 home win over Newcastle United in which he scored a hat-trick. He managed a further 10 league goals that season, though Everton were relatively disappointing in the league as they finished eighth – having been a top four club and twice champions in the previous four seasons. However, they did reach the FA Cup final and were paired with neighbours Liverpool at Wembley on 20 May 1989. It was a close contest but in the end Everton lost 3–2 in extra time. Earlier in the season Cottee and his colleagues and been on the receiving end of another Wembley defeat, this time to Nottingham Forest who beat them 4–3 in the final of the Full Members Cup, but Cottee still managed to get on the scoresheet twice.

Cottee spent his first season at Goodison Park playing alongside Graeme Sharp, but for 1989–90 manager Colin Harvey changed the formation to 4–3–3 and brought in Mike Newell as Everton's third striker. The season began very promisingly for Everton, who went top of the league on 21 October and stayed there until mid November, but their title hopes gradually disintegrated and they finished sixth while the title went to Liverpool. Cottee scored 13 league goals that season.

1990–91 was arguably Everton's worst season in a decade. Harvey was sacked on 31 October 1990 with the Toffees third from bottom in the First Division, and a week later Howard Kendall (who had guided them to two league titles, an FA Cup and a European Cup Winners' Cup in his first spell from 1981 to 1987) was appointed with Harvey returning as his assistant. Everton's form improved under Kendall and they finished ninth, also reaching the FA Cup quarter-finals and ousting Liverpool in the fifth round after two replays; Cottee was Everton's saviour in the first replay on 21 February as he scored a late equaliser which forced a 4–4 draw in Liverpool's last game before the resignation of manager Kenny Dalglish the following day. Cottee managed 10 league goals in the 1990–91 season.

1991–92 was another frustrating season for Cottee and Everton, after the upturn in form that had followed Howard Kendall's return as manager. By mid November he had two new strike partners in Peter Beardsley and Mo Johnston following the sale of both Graeme Sharp and Mike Newell, and while the revamped forward line was reasonably productive, the rest of the team struggled to match their standards. Cottee was restricted to eight goals from 24 games through injury, and Everton finished mid table once again. It was the first time since his debut season nine years earlier that he had scored less than 10 league goals in a season.

1992–93 saw Everton participate in the inaugural FA Premier League, and Cottee did better this time, scoring 12 goals.

He managed 16 league goals in 1993–94, including two hat-tricks, adding a further three goals in cup competitions. But the season almost ended in disaster for Everton who only narrowly avoided relegation just seven years after being league champions. Cottee scores Everton's first two hat-tricks in the Premier League, the first being in a 4–2 home win over Sheffield United early in the season, and then in a 6–2 home win over Swindon Town in January.

New manager Mike Walker, who arrived in January 1994, promised an overhaul of the squad and Cottee was soon being linked with a move back to West Ham after six years on Merseyside. During his absence, the Hammers had been relegated and promoted twice, but were now in the Premier League.

=== Return to West Ham ===
He returned to West Ham United on 7 September 1994 in a part exchange deal for defender David Burrows plus cash. Everton manager Mike Walker had signed Nigerian Daniel Amokachi fresh from World Cup duty and financed the move by selling Cottee, much to Everton fans' disapproval. He had played 184 league games in six years for the Toffees, scoring 76 goals, but had not won any major trophies, and Everton had never finished higher than sixth during his time there. His overall career tally for league goals now stood at 164.

Cottee made his second debut for the Hammers away to Liverpool and was sent off after 54 minutes, although his first season back at Upton Park brought 13 league goals as he helped West Ham fight off relegation and finished 14th in their first season under the management of Harry Redknapp. He had a further 10 goals in 1995–96 as the Hammers finished 10th – their highest finish since 1986 – but he then lost his place in the team to new arrivals Florin Raducioiu and Hugo Porfirio, managing just three games and failing to score in the Premier League before joining Selangor of Malaysia in October 1996. Over two spells at West Ham, he had scored 115 league goals. Added to his goals scored for Everton, he had now managed 187 league goals.

=== Selangor and Leicester City ===
In the autumn of 1996, he joined Malaysian club Selangor for £750,000, where he won the Malaysian FA Cup, his first trophy as a player. In August 1997, he signed for Leicester City for £500,000 where he was presented with his first chance of European football at the age of 32 as Leicester had an ultimately short lived campaign in that season's UEFA Cup. He managed 19 league games and scored four goals as the Foxes finished 10th, and one of those goals came in a shock 1–0 win over title chasing Manchester United at Old Trafford on 31 January 1998. He also had a loan spell at Birmingham City in Division One that season, and in his first taste of second-tier football managed to score one goal. In the semi-final of the 1998–99 Football League Cup against Sunderland Cottee scored three goals across the two legs (two in the first and one in the second) to help Leicester win 3–2 on aggregate. However they lost the final to Tottenham Hotspur.

In 1999–2000, aged 34, he finally won a major trophy in England as he helped Leicester defeat Tranmere Rovers 2–1 in the Football League Cup final. That season he scored 13 league goals, which remained the most Premier League goals scored by a Leicester player in a single season until the 2015–16 season, when Jamie Vardy surpassed his total. He remained at Filbert Street until 11 September 2000, by which time he had played a total of 85 league games for the Foxes and scored 27 goals. This brought his total career tally to 214 goals in the English top division, making him the 17th highest goal scorer in the history of English top flight football.

=== Later career ===
In September 2000, Cottee joined Norwich City as player-coach under recently appointed manager Bryan Hamilton, however this did not last long as Cottee struggled to meet the demands placed on him, scoring two goals against Blackpool in the League Cup and Sheffield United in the league.

A week after resigning from Barnet, Cottee signed for Millwall on transfer deadline day. During this season, which was his last as a player, Cottee played for a different team in each of the top four divisions of English football in the same season, a rare achievement last performed by goalkeeper Eric Nixon in 1986–87.

== Management career ==
After being released by Norwich on 31 October 2000, he took over as player-manager of Barnet, a team closer to his home in London. After winning his first game with the club 7–0 vs Blackpool, Barnet hit a run of poor form which left them facing relegation from the Football League. Cottee resigned on 16 March 2001, however his replacement, John Still (who left the club just before Cottee's appointment six months earlier), was unable to rescue the team from relegation. However, Cottee did manage an impressive nine goals from 16 Division Three games.

== International career ==
Cottee made his debut for England against Sweden on 10 September 1986 as a substitute and went on to win 7 caps, starting once against Scotland at Hampden Park in the 1989 Rous Cup in a 2–0 win.

== Personal life ==
Cottee has stated that he diligently maintains a scrapbook containing press cuttings of every goal he scored throughout his playing career.

=== Media career ===
He is currently a commentator with Sky Sports and occasional pundit for Malaysian network Astro, appearing on its 2010 World Cup and Premier League studio coverage in Kuala Lumpur.

=== Film career ===
Cottee made a cameo appearance in the 2018 action film, Final Score in which he was murdered on live television.

== Career statistics ==
Appearances and goals by club, season and competition
Club	Season	League			National cup (Note: Includes FA Cup, Malaysia FA Cup)		League cup		Continental		Other		Total	
Club	Season	Division	Apps	Goals	Apps	Goals	Apps	Goals	Apps	Goals	Apps	Goals	Apps	Goals
West Ham United	1982–83	First Division	8	5	1	0	0	0	—		—		9	5
West Ham United	1983–84	First Division	39	15	4	0	4	4	—		—		47	19
West Ham United	1984–85	First Division	41	17	5	4	4	3	—		—		50	24
West Ham United	1985–86	First Division	42	20	7	4	3	2	—		—		52	26
West Ham United	1986–87	First Division	42	22	5	1	6	5	–		1 (Note: Appearance(s) in Full Members' Cup)	1	54	29
West Ham United	1987–88	First Division	40	13	2	2	2	0	—		0	0	44	15
West Ham United	Total		212	92	24	11	19	14	—		1	1	256	118
Everton	1988–89	First Division	36	13	8	0	5	2	—		5 (Note: Four appearances and three goals in Full Members' Cup, one appearance in Football League Centenary Trophy)	3	54	18
Everton	1989–90	First Division	27	13	5	2	3	0	—		—		35	15
Everton	1990–91	First Division	29	10	4	2	3	4	—		6	8	42	24
Everton	1991–92	First Division	24	8	2	0	4	1	—		2	1	32	10
Everton	1992–93	Premier League	26	12	0	0	3	1	—		—		29	13
Everton	1993–94	Premier League	39	16	2	0	5	3	—		—		46	19
Everton	1994–95	Premier League	3	0	—		—		—		—		3	0
Everton	Total		184	72	21	4	23	11	—		13	12	241	99
West Ham United	1994–95	Premier League	31	13	2	1	3	1	—		—		36	15
West Ham United	1995–96	Premier League	33	10	3	0	3	2	—		—		39	12
West Ham United	1996–97	Premier League	3	0	—		2	1	—		—		5	1
West Ham United	Total		67	23	5	1	8	4	—		—		80	28
Selangor	1997	Liga Perdana	24	14	7	3	—		—		—		31	17
Leicester City	1997–98	Premier League	19	4	2	1	1	0	1 (Note: Appearance in UEFA Cup)	0	—		23	5
Leicester City	1998–99	Premier League	31	10	1	1	5	5	—		—		37	16
Leicester City	1999–2000	Premier League	33	13	2	0	3	0	—		—		38	13
Leicester City	2000–01	Premier League	2	0	—		—		—		—		2	0
Leicester City	Total		85	27	5	2	9	5	1	0	—		100	34
Birmingham City (loan)	1997–98	First Division	4	1	—		—		—		—		4	1
Norwich City	2000–01	First Division	7	1	—		3	1	—		—		10	2
Barnet	2000–01	Third Division	16	9	2	1	—		—		0	0	18	10
Millwall	2000–01	Second Division	2	0	—		—		—		—		2	0
Career total			601	239	64	22	62	35	1	0	14	13	742	309

== Honours ==
Everton

- FA Cup runner-up: 1988–89
- Full Members' Cup runner-up: 1988–89, 1990–91

Selangor

- Malaysia FA Cup: 1997

Leicester City

- Football League Cup: 1999–2000; runner-up: 1998–99

England

- Rous Cup: 1989

Individual

- PFA Young Player of the Year: 1985–86
