= Dave Swindlehurst =

English footballer

Personal information
- Full name: David Swindlehurst
- Date of birth: 6 January 1956 (age 70)
- Place of birth: Edgware, England
- Height: 6 ft 2 in (1.88 m)
- Position: Striker

Youth career
- ?–1973: Crystal Palace

Senior career*
Years	Team	Apps	(Gls)
1973–1980	Crystal Palace	237	(73)
1980–1983	Derby County	125	(32)
1983–1985	West Ham United	61	(16)
1985–1987	Sunderland	72	(11)
1987	Anorthosis Famagusta	13	(4)
1988	Wimbledon	2	(0)
1988–1989	Colchester United	12	(6)
1988–1989	→ Peterborough United (loan)	4	(1)
Total		526	(143)

International career
1974	England Youth	3	(1)
1976	England U21	1	(0)
	England B	1	(0)

Managerial career
- 1989–????: Bromley
- Molesey
- 2006–2008: Whyteleafe
- * Club domestic league appearances and goals

David Swindlehurst (born 6 January 1956 in Edgware, Middlesex) is an English former footballer who played as a striker. He came through the youth ranks at Crystal Palace and went on to play for several English and overseas clubs, including Derby County, West Ham United, Sunderland, Anorthosis Famagusta, Wimbledon, Colchester United and Peterborough United.

== Career ==
Swindlehurst came up through the ranks at Crystal Palace, playing youth football in the early 1970s with future West Ham United teammate Alan Devonshire. Starting his senior career in 1973, he played for Palace for eight seasons and scored 81 goals in 278 appearances. Swindlehurst first joined Derby County as a loan player, two months before his transfer was made permanent in April 1980. Derby paid £410,000, a then-record for the club.

West Ham manager John Lyall brought Swindlehurst to Upton Park for £160,000 in March 1983. Injuries hampered his chances of regular first-team football. He played his last game for West Ham on 27 April 1985 against Luton Town and after 71 League and cup games for the east Londoners, he moved on to Sunderland.

After a spell in Cyprus with Anorthosis Famagusta, Swindlehurst returned to London to play for Wimbledon, but he managed just two appearances in the season they won the 1988 FA Cup Final, beating Liverpool. He later played for Colchester United, and on loan at Peterborough United.

== Coaching career ==
After spells playing and managing at non-League Bromley and Molesey, he rejoined his former club Crystal Palace to take up a coaching role within the youth academy. He was promoted to reserve team manager in 2001, but was sacked in October 2002.

Swindlehurst joined Crawley Town as assistant manager in 2003. He was sacked in September 2005, and won an unfair dismissal claim against the club the following year. He took the manager's job at Isthmian League Division One South side Whyteleafe in December 2006, and remained there until the end of the following season.

== Honours ==
=== Club ===
Crystal Palace

- Football League Second Division Winner (1): 1978–79
