= Neil Orr =

Scottish footballer (born 1959)

Personal information
- Full name: Neil Ian Orr
- Date of birth: 13 May 1959 (age 67)
- Place of birth: Greenock, Scotland
- Height: 5 ft 10 in (1.78 m)
- Position: Defender

Senior career*
Years	Team	Apps	(Gls)
1975–1982	Morton	186	(1)
1982–1987	West Ham United	146	(4)
1987–1993	Hibernian	166	(3)
1993–1995	St Mirren	29	(1)
1995	Queen of the South	7	(1)
1997–2002	Edinburgh University		

International career
1980	Scottish Football League XI	1	(0)

Managerial career
- 1996: Dartmouth Big Green
- 1997–2002: Edinburgh University (player-manager)
- * Club domestic league appearances and goals

Neil Ian Orr (born 13 May 1959) is a Scottish former professional footballer, who played as a defender.

== Playing career ==
Orr, who was capped for Scotland under-21s and the Scottish Football League XI, played for Morton for seven years, racking up 196 appearances. He joined West Ham United in January 1982 for £400,000, making his debut on 9 January 1982 against Manchester United.

He made a total of 175 league and cup appearances for West Ham, scoring five goals. He went on to play for Hibernian and St Mirren, before ending his career at Queen of the South.

== Coaching career ==
Following his retirement from professional football, Orr spent time coaching in summer camps in the United States, and coached the Dartmouth Big Green women's soccer, before moving back to Scotland to take a player-manager role at Edinburgh University. As well as playing for the club, he worked as head coach and first team manager on a part-time basis of 25 hours per week for 10 months per season. He remained there for five seasons, during which time the club won the Queen's Park Shield three times, were runners up in the King Cup and were twice losing semi-finalists in the BUSA Cup. In 2000–01, EUAFC earned promotion to the East of Scotland Premier Division.

Orr left in the Summer of 2002 for a role as a Youth Development Officer with the Scottish Football Association in Midlothian. In 2011, he moved to Canberra, Australia and continued to work in football development.

== Personal life ==
He is the son of Scotland international Tommy Orr, who also played for Morton.
