= Raymond Atteveld =

Dutch football manager (born 1966)

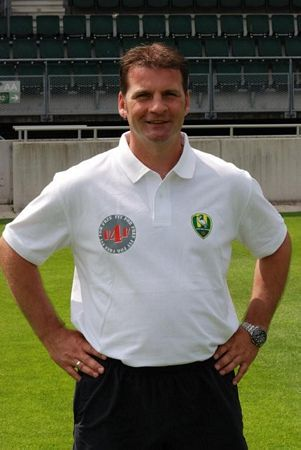
- Atteveld in 2009

Personal information
- Date of birth: 8 September 1966 (age 60)
- Place of birth: Amsterdam, Netherlands
- Positions: Full-back; midfielder

Senior career*
Years	Team	Apps	(Gls)
1985–1989	Haarlem	85	(6)
1989–1992	Everton	51	(1)
1992	→ West Ham United (loan)	1	(0)
1992	Bristol City	14	(1)
1993–1994	Waregem	14	(2)
1994–1995	Roda JC	27	(9)
1995–1997	Vitesse	42	(3)
1997–1999	FC Groningen	65	(10)
1999–2002	ADO Den Haag	27	(0)
Total		326	(32)

Managerial career
- 2007–2008: Roda JC
- 2009–2010: ADO Den Haag
- 2011: AEL Limassol
- 2019–2020: Beitar Tel Aviv Bat Yam
- 2020–2021: Maccabi Netanya
- * Club domestic league appearances and goals

Raymond Atteveld (born 8 September 1966) is a Dutch professional football manager. He works as director of football development for the Kazakhstan Football Federation.

== Playing career ==
Atteveld played for Haarlem before moving to England to join Everton.

He made his debut for Everton on 2 December 1989 against Coventry City, in a 2–0 home win. During his career at Everton, he made 41 league appearances from the outset and a further 10 as a substitute, scoring only one goal. Atteveld is one of seven Dutchmen to have played for Everton, the others being Andy van der Meyde, Sander Westerveld, Johnny Heitinga, Royston Drenthe, Davy Klaassen and Maarten Stekelenburg.

Atteveld was one of the first foreigners to get a regular first-team place in the Everton squad although he struggled to make a name of himself in the English game. Atteveld is remembered by Evertonians for stripping during an end of season lap of honour and throwing his kit into the crowd.

He joined West Ham United on loan, and became the first Dutch player in the club's history when he made played his only league game for the club on 22 February 1992, a 2–1 defeat at Sheffield Wednesday. He made two FA Cup appearances for the club, for the Fifth Round games against Sunderland on 15 February and 26 February.

The tough-tackling holding midfielder joined ambitious Vitesse in summer 1995 from high-flying Roda JC, only to move to FC Groningen a year later. In summer 1999, Atteveld left FC Groningen for ADO Den Haag.

== Managerial career ==
Atteveld worked as an assistant manager for Roda in 2006, until 2007, where he was promoted to manager/technical director after the departure of Huub Stevens. He qualified for the play-offs for European football, only to miss out going into Europe by 2 draws in the encounter with FC Utrecht. However, due to struggles within the board after the placement of a new technical director, he was sacked on 7 October 2008. On 17 April 2009, he replaced André Wetzel as the new ADO Den Haag manager/technical director. Atteveld managed to keep ADO Den Haag in the Dutch Premier league with scoring 12 goals in the last 4 games of that season. The following season, Atteveld now replaced Wetzel as Technical Director to finish the season. In that summer Atteveld refused to continue in his present role and therefore left the club on mutual terms in the summer of 2010. In February 2011 he moved abroad to coach Cypriot outfit AEL Limassol on an interim basis. AEL Limassol reached the play-offs under Atteveld. He mainly played with youngsters due to non salary payment of 1st team regulars. This working with the AEL youngsters resulted in Atteveld taking the Academy Director role the following seasons to come. As an Academy Director Atteveld introduced a successful playing style all throughout the club. 300% increase in National Team players was the result of this approach. Up until today, his philosophy and structure are still used within the club.

Atteveld later went on to supervise as Senior Academy consultant at FC Banants Yerevan in Armenia before moving to Kazakhstan in 2013. In Kazakhstan Atteveld was Academy Director for the U14 until U19 teams. During this time the Kazakh outfit, FC Kairat Almaty, broke all records regarding championships. Many players of the academy broke into the National Team of Kazakhstan. In the 2013–2014 season, 3 teams of the academy became champions of Kazakhstan. In 2014–2015, 4 teams took the championship, only to be improved by 5 championship-winning teams in 2015–2016. A record set for Kazakhstan by any club, and up until today FC Kairat Almaty still holds this record. At the beginning of the season 2016-2017 Atteveld was offered the role of Head Coach of FC Kairat Almaty B team, operating in Div. 2. Atteveld kindly declined for this position and went on to introduce his own Academy, the Dutch Total Football Academy in Almaty. A call from Maccabi Tel Aviv FC in Israel to strengthen their setup ended this private academy adventure early on.

In Israel, at the biggest club, Maccabi Tel Aviv FC, Atteveld arrived in September 2016 to take charge of the football development of the older Academy coaches and players for the U16, U17, and U19 teams. As a Performance Director, Atteveld introduced, among other things, the concept of Elite training for contract players within the academy while setting out an individual program for every player. Atteveld was tasked with leading a team in Div. 1 with prospects loaned from Maccabi Tel Aviv FC The club, named Beitar Tel Aviv Bat Yam, is operating in the 1st division and is presently the youngest team in this league (average age 20yrs). Now in 7th position, before the coronavirus brought a stop to the league. Teams within the positions 1-8 will qualify for the promotion play-offs at the end of the season to the Israeli PL. With 2 games to go before the regular season ends, Atteveld and Beitar Tel Aviv Bat Yam are in a perfect position to reach the promotion play-offs. During the winter break some players did move to the IPL, with more on the cards for the next season.

After his successful spell at Beitar Tel Aviv Bat Yam, Atteveld was asked to lead Israeli Premier League team FC Maccabi Netanya as a Head Coach/Manager. Atteveld signed a 1-year contract with an option to renew. At FC Maccabi Netanya, Atteveld was tasked by CEO Niv Goldstein, the present Israeli FA CEO, to change the Performance Culture in the club. This was done with huge success, judging by a historic ROI and with the youngest team in the Israeli PL. FC Maccabi Netanya narrowly missed out on reaching the upper play-offs by one point but went on to finish the lower play-off without losing a game. During this 1st season, multiple players were sold to Belgium Premier League and local giants Maccabi Tel Aviv. Atteveld was offered to renew his contract despite interest from other big names in the league. The following season started poorly as a result of selling off many players and Atteveld was released early on in the season.

Hapoel Rishon Lezion FC was the next brief stage in the Israeli 1st division. The cooperation didn't turn out well, and the interim spell was ended prematurely.

In the 2022–2023 season, Atteveld joined Ukrainian PL team FC Zorya Luhansk as an assistant coach, working with his long-time colleague Patrick van Leeuwen. To the surprise of many, Zorya Luhansk finished third in the Ukrainian Premier League and qualified for the EU Conference Group Stage. Players and coaches attracted interest from local giants and foreign teams, which resulted in transfers from players to local giants FC Shakhtar Donetsk, to Sunderland FC in the English Championship, and to the Polish Premier League as well. Both coaches were poached by FC Shakhtar Donetsk after this highly successful season.

Atteveld and van Leeuwen arrived at FC Shakhtar Donetsk for the 2023–2024 season in war-driven Ukraine. FC SD succeeded in the league, cup and UEFA Champions League group stage. Shakhtar was in a shared 2nd position after 2 games, together with FC Porto. In the league, FCSD was 3rd with one game in hand, which, if won, would bring them to the top of the table, while in the cup, the Ukrainian giants reached the 1/4 finals. It was a surprise to many, but Head Coach van Leeuwen was released following these impressive results, which led to Atteveld, loyal to Van Leeuwen, also leaving FC Shakhtar Donetsk.

During the winter break of the 2023–2024 season, there was talk of Atteveld returning to Zorya Luhansk, this time as Head Coach. If we believe the media, lengthy negotiations went on only for Raymond Atteveld, who surprisingly joined the Kazakhstan Football Federation as Director of Football Development. On 19–02–2024, Atteveld signed a long-term contract for the KFF to take on the challenging role of further developing football in Kazakhstan. Atteveld already had some history in Kazakhstan while working for giants FC Kairat Almaty as a U14-U19 Academy Director, who in that time broke all records regarding players reaching the 1st team, national teams, and championships.
