= Kevin Sheedy (Irish footballer) =

Republic of Ireland international footballer and manager

Personal information
- Full name: Kevin Mark Sheedy
- Date of birth: 21 October 1959 (age 67)
- Place of birth: Builth Wells, Wales
- Height: 1.75 m (5 ft 9 in)
- Position: Left midfielder

Youth career
- –1975: Hereford Lads Club

Senior career*
Years	Team	Apps	(Gls)
1975–1978	Hereford United	51	(4)
1978–1982	Liverpool	3	(0)
1982–1992	Everton	274	(67)
1992–1993	Newcastle United	37	(4)
1993–1994	Blackpool	26	(1)
Total		391	(76)

International career
1978–1981	Republic of Ireland U21	5	(0)
1984–1993	Republic of Ireland	46	(9)

Managerial career
- 2001: Tranmere Rovers (caretaker)
- 2021: Waterford
- * Club domestic league appearances and goals

Kevin Mark Sheedy (born 21 October 1959) is a football coach and former Republic of Ireland international player.

He spent the largest portion of his playing career with Everton – with whom he won the FA Cup, European Cup Winners' Cup and two Football League titles – and also played for Hereford United, Liverpool, Newcastle United and Blackpool. Born in Builth Wells, Wales, he played 46 times for the Republic of Ireland national team and scored the country's first ever goal in a FIFA World Cup finals.

== Club career ==
After playing for Hereford Lads Club as a boy, Sheedy started his career with Hereford United, followed by a short spell with Liverpool, where he played five competitive games in four years and scored two goals in the League Cup. He was sold to Everton for £100,000 in 1982. At Everton he made 357 appearances (12 as substitute) and scored 97 goals.

Sheedy's most notable achievements were as part of Everton's title winning teams in 1985 and 1987, and in 1985 the European Cup Winners' Cup, scoring in the final itself. In the 1980s Sheedy scored the most goals from free-kicks in the top-flight of the English football league. Perhaps his most famous free-kick moment came in an FA Cup tie against Ipswich Town in 1985 when he scored with a 19-yard free-kick into goalkeeper Paul Cooper's right-hand corner, but having been forced to re-take the kick, proceeded to curl the ball into the keeper's left-hand corner. He was selected in the PFA Team of the Year in both Everton championship winning years of 1985 and 1987.

Sheedy left Goodison Park in 1992 after 10 years on a free transfer to join Newcastle United, and helped them win the Division One title, and promotion to the Premier League, in 1992–93.

External videos
- Sheedy scores for Newcastle away at Peterborough

He ended his career with Blackpool in the 1993–94 Division Two campaign.

== International career ==
Sheedy was born in Wales to an Irish father and Welsh mother. He held Irish citizenship from birth and chose to play for the Republic of Ireland. His Irish citizenship stemmed from the fact that his father was from County Clare. He played 46 times for Ireland scoring nine goals, including one in a game in the 1990 World Cup against England. Ireland drew all three of their group games to qualify for the last 16 of the tournament, and subsequently beat Romania 5–4 on penalties, Sheedy scoring the first of Ireland's penalties. Ireland went on to lose 1–0 to hosts Italy in the quarter-final.

Sheedy was also part of the Euro 88 squad and played all three matches. He is also noted as the first-ever Republic of Ireland player to score a goal in the World Cup finals.

== Managerial career ==
Since retiring from playing, Sheedy has been assistant manager at Tranmere Rovers (and a short spell as joint-caretaker manager) and Hartlepool United. He joined Everton's coaching staff in July 2006, where he coached the academy team.

=== Al-Shabab ===
Sheedy spent three years working with the junior players in Saudi Arabia at Al-Shabab from 2017 from 2020.

=== Waterford ===
On 17 December 2020, Sheedy was appointed manager of League of Ireland Premier Division side Waterford, with Mike Newell as assistant. He was sacked from the post on 5 May 2021 with the club bottom of the table after nine games.

== Personal life ==
In late August 2012 Sheedy was diagnosed with bowel cancer. He revealed to the media that his family had a history of the disease.

== Career statistics ==
=== International ===
Appearances and goals by national team and year
National team	Year	Apps	Goals
Republic of Ireland	1983	2	1
Republic of Ireland	1984	1	0
Republic of Ireland	1985	5	1
Republic of Ireland	1986	2	0
Republic of Ireland	1987	1	0
Republic of Ireland	1988	7	2
Republic of Ireland	1989	6	0
Republic of Ireland	1990	9	2
Republic of Ireland	1991	8	1
Republic of Ireland	1992	4	1
Republic of Ireland	1993	2	1
Total		47	9

Scores and results list Republic of Ireland's goal tally first, score column indicates score after each Sheedy goal

List of international goals scored by Kevin Sheedy
Goal	Date	Venue	Opponent	Score	Result	Competition	Ref.
1	16 November 1983	Dalymount Park, Dublin, Ireland	Malta	6–0	8–0	UEFA Euro 1984 qualification	
2	2 June 1985	Lansdowne Road, Dublin, Ireland	Switzerland	3–0	3–0	1986 FIFA World Cup qualification	
3	22 May 1988	Lansdowne Road, Dublin, Ireland	Poland	1–0	3–1	Friendly	
4	19 October 1988	Lansdowne Road, Dublin, Ireland	Tunisia	4–0	4–0	Friendly	
5	16 May 1990	Lansdowne Road, Dublin, Ireland	Finland	1–1	1–1	Friendly	
6	11 June 1990	Stadio Sant'Elia, Cagliari, Italy	England	1–1	1–1	1990 FIFA World Cup	
7	11 September 1990	Stadion ETO, Győr, Hungary	Hungary	2–1	2–1	Friendly	
8	9 September 1992	Lansdowne Road, Dublin, Ireland	Latvia	1–0	4–0	1994 FIFA World Cup qualification	
9	1 February 1993	Tolka Park, Dublin, Ireland	Wales	1–1	2–1	Friendly	

== Honours ==
Everton

- Football League First Division: 1984–85, 1986–87
- FA Cup: 1983–84; runner-up: 1984–85, 1985–86, 1988–89
- FA Charity Shield: 1984, 1985, 1986 (shared), 1987
- European Cup Winners' Cup: 1984–85
- Football League Cup runner-up: 1983–84
- Full Members' Cup runner-up: 1988–89, 1990–91

Newcastle United

- Football League First Division: 1992–93

Individual

- PFA Team of the Year: 1984–85 First Division, 1986–87 First Division

== See also ==
- List of Republic of Ireland international footballers born outside the Republic of Ireland
