= Neil McDonald (footballer) =

English footballer (born 1965)

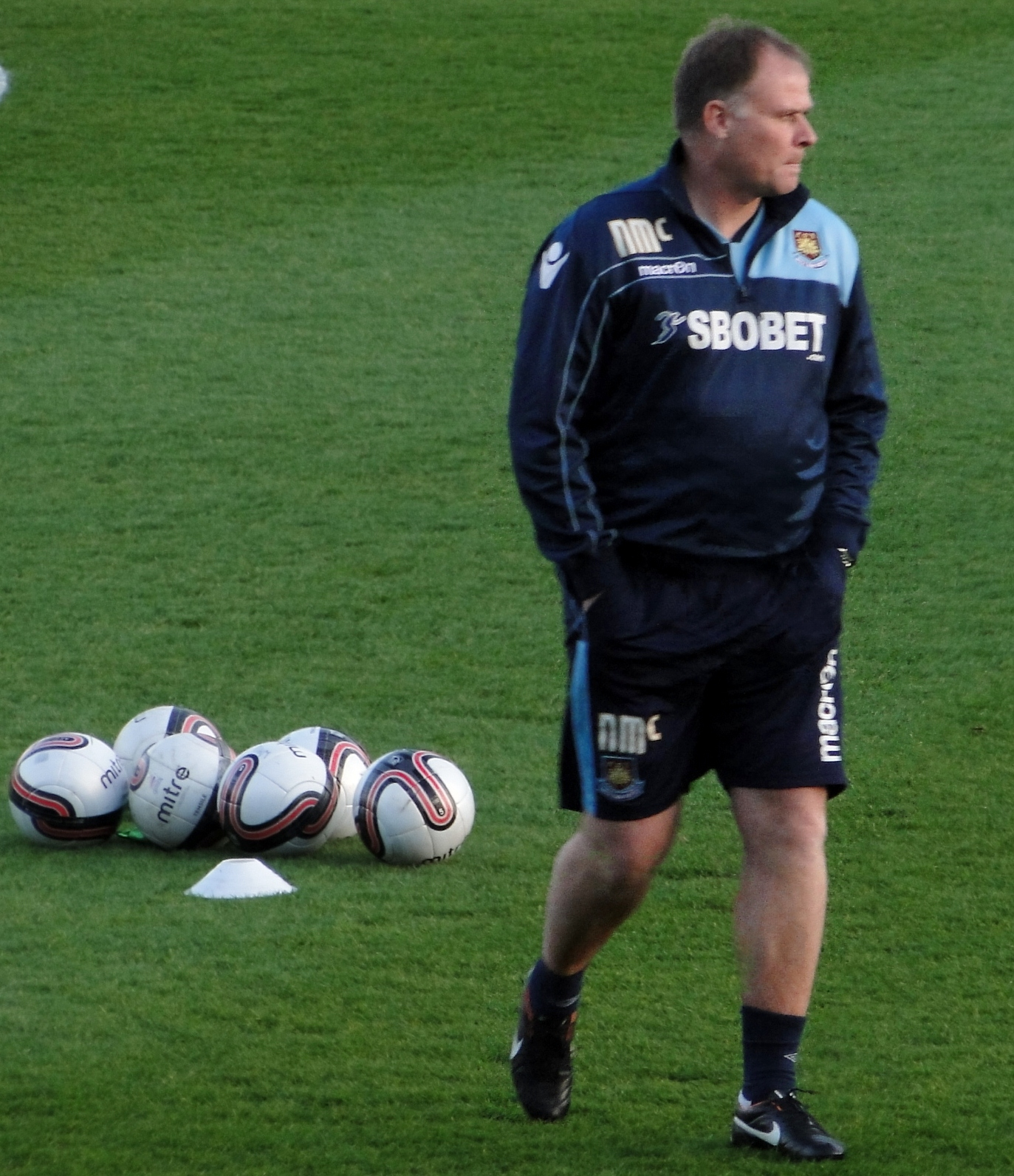
- McDonald as a coach with West Ham United in 2012

Personal information
- Full name: Neil Raymond McDonald
- Date of birth: 2 November 1965 (age 61)
- Place of birth: Wallsend, England
- Height: 5 ft 11 in (1.80 m)
- Positions: Right back; midfielder

Youth career
- Wallsend Boys Club
- Carlisle United

Senior career*
Years	Team	Apps	(Gls)
1983–1988	Newcastle United	180	(24)
1988–1991	Everton	90	(4)
1991–1994	Oldham Athletic	21	(1)
1994–1995	Bolton Wanderers	6	(0)
1995–1998	Preston North End	34	(0)
Total		331	(29)

International career
1983–1984	England Youth	5	(1)
1986–1987	England U21	5	(0)

Managerial career
- 2006–2007: Carlisle United
- 2007: Östersunds FK
- 2015–2016: Blackpool
- 2017–2018: Limerick
- 2022: Walsall (caretaker)
- 2025–2026: Barrow (caretaker)
- * Club domestic league appearances and goals

Neil Raymond McDonald (born 2 November 1965) is a football manager, coach and former player, in the right back and midfield positions. He was most recently caretaker manager at Barrow.

During his career he played for the England under 21 team. As a manager, he has been in charge at Carlisle United and Östersunds FK.

== Playing career ==
Born in Wallsend, North Tyneside, McDonald started his playing career at his local youth team Wallsend Boys Club before joining Carlisle United as a schoolboy, where he represented England at schoolboy level. He then joined Newcastle United as an apprentice where he went on to play over 200 league and cup games. He also was an England Youth and England under 21 international while at St. James'.

McDonald then joined Everton, for £525,000, in the summer of 1988. At Everton he played in the 1989 FA Cup Final against local rivals Liverpool. Everton lost the game 3–2.

McDonald's Everton career lasted 3 years with McDonald playing over 100 league and cup games. Memorable moments, apart from the 1989 FA Cup final appearance, were being part of the Everton side that topped the First Division in the late autumn of 1989 (though they were unable to sustain their title challenge in the long run and finished sixth) and being voted club player of the year for the 1990–91 season.

In October 1991 he joined Oldham Athletic, newly promoted to the top tier, for £500,000. He stayed there for three seasons, overseeing two successful battles against relegation before they were finally relegated from the FA Premier League in 1994. He also helped them reach the FA Cup semi finals in 1994, and they were 1–0 up against Manchester United in extra time at Wembley when a late equaliser from Mark Hughes forced a replay and put Oldham's dreams of a first ever FA Cup final appearance on ice. A few days later they were crushed 4–1 in the replay and McDonald was robbed of yet another chance of FA Cup glory.

After Oldham's relegation, he signed for Bolton Wanderers and helped them win promotion to the FA Premier League as Division One playoff winners in 1994–95, as well as reaching the Football League Cup final where they lost 2–1 to Liverpool. He was out of action for the most part of his time with Bolton with a broken ankle. but returned in time for their end of season Play Off, firstly he was sent off in their semi-final defeat against Wolves and then he was subbed at half time in Bolton's Play Off win over Reading at Wembley Stadium.

A £40,000 move took him to Preston North End in November 1995, and he remained at Deepdale until his retirement from playing at the end of the 1998–99 season. In his first season at Preston, they won promotion as Division Three champions, and by the time of his retirement three years later, they had qualified for the Division Two playoffs. Although they lost out that season, they won promotion a year later as champions. He ended his playing career at Preston a year after the appointment of David Moyes (later manager of McDonald's former club Everton) as manager.

== Coaching career ==
McDonald was a coach at several teams. His first coaching job was with Preston North End he started this in 1997 as a player/coach and taking the coaching role on a full-time basis in 1998. Then in the year 2000 he joined Sam Allardyce's backroom staff at Bolton Wanderers as first-team coach and earning his UEFA Pro Licence while at The Reebok. He joined Crystal Palace in 2005 to become Iain Dowie's assistant.

He subsequently became Carlisle United manager in summer 2006, following Paul Simpson's departure to Preston North End.

McDonald had a winning start in his first competitive match as manager, beating Doncaster Rovers 1–0 on 5 August 2006 at Brunton Park in League One. The team finished the season in 8th place, Carlisle's highest league placing in 20 years. McDonald was sacked from his post as Carlisle United manager on 13 August 2007, a statement on the club's website read "The board of Carlisle United regret to say that they have lost confidence in Neil McDonald and are terminating his contract forthwith."

On 11 September 2007 he took over as manager of Swedish club Östersunds FK, managing the team for a five-week period, during which he saved the club from relegation.

In November 2007 he joined Lincoln City, where former Newcastle teammate Peter Jackson had previously been appointed manager, as his assistant. This appointment didn't last long however, as a few months later in February 2008, McDonald was appointed as head coach under Gary McAllister at Leeds United.

On 18 December 2008 he was reunited with Sam Allardyce at Blackburn Rovers, as assistant manager. On 21 November 2009 it was announced that McDonald would take charge of three Blackburn Rovers matches against Bolton Wanderers, Fulham and Stoke City during which time manager Sam Allardyce would be undergoing heart surgery. He also took charge of a fourth match in the Football League Cup in which Rovers played league leaders Chelsea for a place in the semi-finals. Rovers won the game after a penalty shootout after a 3–3 draw. On 13 December 2010 McDonald was sacked by Blackburn's new owners along with Allardyce. Following his appointment as manager, on 1 June 2011, Allardyce announced McDonald as his assistant manager at West Ham United.

On 2 June 2015 he was announced as manager of Blackpool. Following Blackpool's relegation to League Two, McDonald left his role as Blackpool manager.

On 24 October 2016, McDonald was appointed as assistant head coach at Hull City. He left the club in January 2017, following the sacking of head coach Mike Phelan.

McDonald was announced as the new manager of League of Ireland Premier Division club Limerick on 18 May 2017.

On 4 January 2018, McDonald joined Scunthorpe United to become Graham Alexander's assistant.

On 30 May 2018, McDonald joined Swindon Town as assistant manager to Phil Brown.

On 12 November 2018, McDonald was sacked as assistant manager at Swindon Town

On 1 October 2019, McDonald joined Indian club Hyderabad in ISL as assistant manager to Phil Brown. On 11 January 2020, Phil Brown and McDonald was sacked by Hyderabad for poor performance of the newly formed club.

On 19 May 2021, McDonald was appointed assistant coach to Matt Taylor at Walsall. Following the sacking of Taylor on 9 February 2022, McDonald was put in temporary charge of the club. His first game in temporary charge saw his side end a seven-match losing streak against second placed Tranmere Rovers. On 15 February, following the appointment of Michael Flynn, McDonald departed the club.

On 21 March 2022, McDonald was appointed assistant manager, again to Phil Brown, at Barrow until the end of the 2021–22 season. McDonald had worked at the club the previous season, supporting Rob Kelly as Barrow avoided relegation, hoping to achieve a similar feat in the nine remaining matches of the campaign.

On 8 June 2023, McDonald has been appointed as assistant coach at Bengaluru FC.

On 16 January 2024, McDonald was appointed as assistant manager to Phil Brown at Kidderminster Harriers. The duo signed a new two-year deal following relegation at the end of the season.

On 1 August 2025, McDonald was announced as assistant first-team manager at Hartlepool United, as part of Simon Grayson's new backroom team ahead of the 2025–26 season. He left the club on 6 October.

He was named interim manager of Barrow on 10 December.

== Personal life ==
His daughter Ella McDonald is a professional tennis player.

== Managerial statistics ==
Updated 1 January 2026.

Team	Nat	From	To	Record				
Team	Nat	From	To	G	W	D	L	Win %
Carlisle United	(England)	17 June 2006	13 August 2007	51	19	14	18	37.25
Östersund	(Sweden)	11 September 2007	13 October 2007	5	2	2	1	40.00
Blackpool	(England)	2 June 2015	18 May 2016	50	13	10	27	26.00
Limerick	(Republic of Ireland)	18 May 2017	4 January 2018	26	10	5	11	38.46
Walsall (caretaker)	(England)	9 February 2022	15 February 2022	1	1	0	0	100.00
Barrow (caretaker)	(England)	10 December 2025	2 January 2026	5	1	1	3	20.00
Total				142	47	34	61	33.10

== Honours ==
Everton

- FA Cup runner-up: 1988–89
- Full Members' Cup runner-up: 1988–89, 1990–91

Bolton Wanderers

- Football League First Division play-offs: 1995
