= Peter Beagrie =

English footballer

Personal information
- Full name: Peter Sidney Beagrie
- Date of birth: 28 November 1965 (age 60)
- Place of birth: Middlesbrough, England
- Height: 5 ft 8 in (1.73 m)
- Position: Winger

Youth career
- Middlesbrough

Senior career*
Years	Team	Apps	(Gls)
1983–1986	Middlesbrough	33	(2)
1986–1988	Sheffield United	84	(11)
1988–1989	Stoke City	54	(7)
1989–1994	Everton	114	(11)
1991	→ Sunderland (loan)	5	(1)
1994–1997	Manchester City	52	(3)
1997–2001	Bradford City	132	(20)
1998	→ Everton (loan)	6	(0)
2001	→ Wigan Athletic (loan)	10	(1)
2001–2006	Scunthorpe United	172	(34)
2006	Grimsby Town	9	(0)
Total		671	(90)

International career
1987	England U21	2	(0)
1989	England B	2	(0)
- * Club domestic league appearances and goals

Peter Sidney Beagrie (born 28 November 1965) is an English former professional footballer, sports television pundit and commentator.

As a player, he was a left-winger in a career that lasted from 1983 to 2006. He played for ten different clubs at professional level notably appearing in the Premier League with Everton, Manchester City and Bradford City. He also played in the Football League for Middlesbrough, Sheffield United, Stoke City, Sunderland, Wigan Athletic and Scunthorpe United before ending his career in 2006 following a brief stint at Grimsby Town at the age of 40. Towards the end of his career, his five-year period at Scunthorpe yielded 172 appearances and 34 goals over a five-season stay, and was the most in both statistics for a single club during his career.

He was capped twice at England U21 level, before going on to win another two caps in 1989 for the England B team. He is well remembered for his somersault goal celebration.

== Club career ==
=== Middlesbrough ===
Born in Middlesbrough, Beagrie started his professional footballing career as an apprentice at Middlesbrough in 1983. Beagrie fell out of favour with the fans at Middlesbrough for being one of only two players (the other was then club captain Don O'Riordan) to cut ties with the club after liquidation in 1986.

=== Sheffield United ===
Beagrie arrived at Sheffield United in August 1986, being signed by then manager Billy McEwan for a tribunal agreed fee of £35,000. Played predominantly on the left wing Beagrie was virtually ever present during his two-year spell at Bramall Lane. Popular with United fans he was voted 'Player of the Year' at the end of his first season but at times could also be frustrating as he wasted possession and failed to gel with his teammates. When new manager Dave Bassett arrived in the summer of 1988 he deemed Beagrie too inconsistent and placed him on the transfer list. He left the Blades having made just short of 100 appearances and scored eleven goals. His next port of call was a £210,000 move to Stoke City.

=== Stoke City ===
Beagrie's arrival at the Victoria Ground was met with great approval by supporters and players alike with Chris Kamara stating: "He is the best winger in the country - even better than John Barnes". Beagrie didn't disappoint but he was often too quick for his own teammates who would miss-time their runs. In 1988–89 Beagrie top-scored with eight goals in 46 appearances. Stoke made a poor start to the 1989–90 season and with the club rock bottom the table they decided to sell Beagrie to Everton for a then record out-going fee of £750,000 in November 1989.

=== Everton and Manchester City ===
Beagrie remained with Everton through the forming of the Premier League, staying with The Toffees until March 1994 when he transferred to Manchester City for £1.1 million. His move to Maine Road was sparked by the arrival at Goodison Park of Anders Limpar, who had ironically been a target for City manager Brian Horton. Whilst at Everton he spent time on loan with Sunderland in 1991. Beagrie played under Alan Ball and Brian Horton while at Maine Road but suffered relegation from the Premier League in the 1995–96 season. City struggled in the Football League at first and the club soon found itself embroiled in another relegation battle, and in the end Beagrie and The Blues only managed a lower half mid table finish.

=== Bradford City ===
Beagrie was to leave the club at the end of the season and moved to City's First Division rivals Bradford City. He was sent out on loan to his former club Everton during his first season but returned to help the club win promotion to the Premier League in 1998–99. He also spent a spell on loan at Wigan Athletic, where he scored once against Wycombe Wanderers in 10 league appearances.

=== Scunthorpe United ===
Beagrie left Bradford at the end of the 2000–01 season when City lost their Premier League status; he would then drop down three leagues to join Scunthorpe United. He was a regular in the Scunthorpe team for the duration of his stay with the Iron. He moved on to the club's coaching staff aiding manager Brian Laws and his assistant Russ Wilcox. The club failed in their bid for promotion from the Third Division in the 2002–03 campaign after losing 6–3 on aggregate to rivals Lincoln City in the play-off semi final. The Iron and Beagrie gained promotion in the 2004–05 season and on his 40th birthday he made his 750th footballing appearance and scored his 100th goal for his ninth club playing for Scunthorpe in the 2005–06 season.

He was to make his final appearance for the Iron in a 1–1 away draw with Oldham Athletic on 6 May 2006. He was replaced in the 68th minute of the game by Steve Torpey and this would mark the end of an era for both player and club. In 2005, he was named as one of Scunthorpe's 'cult heroes' in a poll conducted by BBC Sport.

=== Grimsby Town ===
Beagrie left Scunthorpe United in June 2006, supposedly to concentrate on his media involvement with Sky Sports which had increased in latter years – but on 11 July 2006, he signed a one-year deal with Scunthorpe's local rivals, Grimsby Town in a player–coach capacity. His job was to aid new manager Graham Rodger and his new assistant Stuart Watkiss at Blundell Park. He made his first appearance for the club in a 1–0 friendly win over Gainsborough Trinity in a game in which he set up the only goal of the game for his former Bradford teammate Isaiah Rankin. His league debut for the club was in a 3–2 win over Boston United on the opening day of the season. Grimsby struggled to make ground in the early stages of the season, and Beagrie often found himself playing a cameo role in the first team . In October 2006, Beagrie's contract was cancelled by mutual consent. Following this his retirement from football was announced during the You're on Sky Sports programme on 30 October 2006.

== International career ==
He made two appearances for the England B team and also played twice for the England under-21 side.

== Media career ==
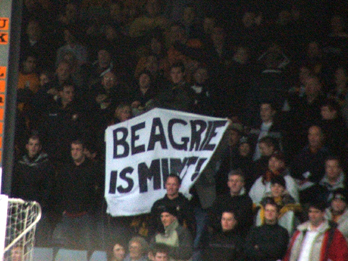
A banner reads "Beagrie is Mint!"

He is now known for his media work for both Sky Sports and the ITV programme Soccer Night. He also appears on the football phone-in show You're on Sky Sports, usually on Monday nights. Beagrie has also made numerous appearances on the Sky Sports programme Soccer AM and every time he is mentioned on the show its presenters and other crew members rejoice with the phrase "Peter Beagrie is Mint". He has a regular column on the Sky Sports website. Since 2010, he has done work for Norwegian TV2.

== Personal life ==
Beagrie lives in Harrogate, North Yorkshire with his son Sam and daughters, Rebecca and Charlotte. His wife Lynn died in 2015 after a five-year battle with cancer. In 1991, whilst playing for Everton, Beagrie was involved in a motorcycle crash during Everton's pre-season tour of Spain. Having left a bar, Beagrie flagged down a Spanish motorcyclist and convinced him to give him a lift to his hotel. Upon arriving at the hotel he did not wake the night porter. Beagrie then drove the motorcycle up the hotel steps and smashed right through the plate glass window. He required 50 stitches. He was drunk at the time.

On 16 August 2017 he was sacked by Sky Sports after being found guilty of assaulting his girlfriend. Beagrie who was drunk had also threatened to "rip the throat out" of his partner. Initially suspended by Sky he was sacked after the result of the court case.

== Career statistics ==
Appearances and goals by club, season and competition
Club	Season	League			FA Cup		League Cup		Other^{[A]}		Total	
Club	Season	Division	Apps	Goals	Apps	Goals	Apps	Goals	Apps	Goals	Apps	Goals
Middlesbrough	1984–85	Second Division	7	1	0	0	0	0	0	0	7	1
Middlesbrough	1985–86	Second Division	26	1	0	0	1	0	2	0	29	1
Middlesbrough	Total		33	2	0	0	1	0	2	0	36	2
Sheffield United	1986–87	Second Division	41	9	3	0	3	0	1	0	48	9
Sheffield United	1987–88	Second Division	43	2	2	0	2	0	4	0	51	2
Sheffield United	Total		84	11	5	0	5	0	5	0	99	11
Stoke City	1988–89	Second Division	41	7	3	1	2	0	0	0	46	8
Stoke City	1989–90	Second Division	13	0	0	0	2	0	0	0	15	0
Stoke City	Total		54	7	3	1	4	0	0	0	61	8
Everton	1989–90	First Division	19	0	3	0	0	0	0	0	22	0
Everton	1990–91	First Division	17	2	2	0	0	0	5	1	26	3
Everton	1991–92	First Division	27	3	2	0	2	2	1	0	32	5
Everton	1992–93	Premier League	22	3	0	0	4	0	0	0	26	3
Everton	1993–94	Premier League	29	3	2	0	3	1	0	0	35	3
Everton	Total		114	11	9	0	9	3	6	1	138	15
Sunderland (loan)	1991–92	Second Division	5	1	0	0	0	0	0	0	5	1
Manchester City	1993–94	Premier League	9	1	0	0	0	0	0	0	9	1
Manchester City	1994–95	Premier League	37	2	4	1	6	1	0	0	47	4
Manchester City	1995–96	Premier League	5	0	0	0	2	0	0	0	7	0
Manchester City	1996–97	First Division	1	0	1	0	0	0	0	0	2	0
Manchester City	Total		52	3	5	1	8	1	0	0	65	5
Bradford City	1997–98	First Division	34	0	1	0	2	0	0	0	37	0
Bradford City	1998–99	First Division	43	12	2	0	5	3	0	0	50	15
Bradford City	1999–2000	Premier League	35	7	2	0	2	0	0	0	39	7
Bradford City	2000–01	Premier League	19	1	1	0	0	0	1	0	21	1
Bradford City	Total		132	20	6	0	10	3	1	0	148	23
Everton (loan)	1997–98	Premier League	6	0	0	0	0	0	0	0	6	0
Wigan Athletic (loan)	2000–01	Second Division	10	1	0	0	0	0	2	0	12	1
Scunthorpe United	2001–02	Third Division	40	11	3	0	1	0	2	2	46	13
Scunthorpe United	2002–03	Third Division	34	5	0	0	0	0	2	0	37	5
Scunthorpe United	2003–04	Third Division	32	11	5	0	2	1	3	0	42	12
Scunthorpe United	2004–05	League Two	36	2	3	0	1	0	0	0	40	2
Scunthorpe United	2005–06	League One	30	5	3	0	1	0	1	0	35	5
Scunthorpe United	Total		172	34	14	0	5	1	8	2	199	37
Grimsby Town	2006–07	League Two	9	0	0	0	1	0	0	0	10	0
Career Total			671	90	42	2	43	8	24	3	780	103

A. The "Other" column constitutes appearances and goals in the Football League Trophy, Football League play-offs, and Full Members Cup.

== Honours ==
Individual

- PFA Team of the Year: 2001–02 Third Division, 2003–04 Third Division, 2004–05 Football League Two
