= List of Thames Ironworks F.C. records and statistics =

This is a list of Southern League, FA Cup and Test Match appearances made, and goals scored, by Thames Ironworks F.C. players from 1895 until 1900. This list does not include London League, friendly or reserve statistics.

== Player records ==
| No. | | Player | Pos | S Lg Apps | S Lg Gls | FA Apps | FA Gls | Test Apps | Test Gls | Total Apps | Total Gls | Date signed | Previous club |
Thames Ironworks F.C. 1895–1900 First XI (Most Appearances)
| 1 | (England) | Tommy Moore | GK | 48 | | 10 | | 3 | | 61 | | 1898 | Millwall |
| 2 | (Scotland) | Tommy Dunn | RB | 32 | | 7 | | 3 | | 42 | | 1898 | Chatham F.C. |
| 3 | (England) | Walter Tranter (Captain) | FB | 20 | | 5 | | 2 | | 27+ | | 1897 | Thames Ironworks Employee |
| 4 | (England) | Charlie Dove | RH | 29 | 3 | 10 | | 2 | | 41+ | 5 | 1895 | Thames Ironworks Employee |
| 5 | (Scotland) | Simon Chisholm | D | 15 | 1 | 5 | 2 | 2 | | 22+ | 3 | 1897 | Inverness |
| 6 | (Scotland) | Roddy McEachrane (Captain) | LH | 28 | | 7 | 2 | 1 | | 36 | 2 | 1898 | Thames Ironworks Employee |
| 7 | (England) | Henry Hird | RW | 20 | 3 | 7 | 1 | | | 27+ | 4 | 1897 | Stockton F.C. |
| 8 | (Scotland) | Kenny McKay | IR | 28 | 8 | 7 | 5 | 1 | | 36 | 13 | 1899 | Tottenham |
| 9 | (England) | Bill Joyce | CF | 27 | 8 | 7 | 7 | 1 | 3 | 35 | 18 | 1899 | Tottenham |
| 10 | (England) | Albert Carnelly | IL | 27 | 8 | 6 | 6 | 1 | | 34 | 14 | 1899 | Bristol City |
| 11 | (England) | Frank Taylor | LW | 14 | 1 | | | 1 | | 15 | 1 | 1899 | Harwich |
Players with 10+ appearances
| 5 | (England) | Willie Stewart | CH | 16 | | | | 1 | 1 | 17 | 1 | 1899 | Luton |
| 3 | (England) | Syd King | LB | 16 | | 7 | | | | 23 | | 1899 | New Brompton |
| 10 | (England) | George Gresham | IL | 14 | 4 | 7 | 1 | 1 | | 22+ | 5 | 1896 | Gainsborough Trinity |
| 7 | (Scotland) | Bob Allan | RW | 21 | 1 | | | 1 | | 22 | 1 | 1899 | Dundee |
| 2 | (Scotland) | Charlie Craig | FB/WH | 17 | | 4 | | 1 | | 22 | | 1899 | Dundee |
| 8 | (Scotland) | Jimmy Reid | IL | 14 | 9 | 4 | 2 | 1 | | 19+ | 11 | 1897 | Reading |
| 9 | (England) | David Lloyd | CF | 11 | 12 | 3 | | 2 | 2 | 16 | 14 | 1898 | 3rd Grenadier Guards F.C. |
| 5 | (Scotland) | Peter McManus | CH | 10 | | 4 | 1 | 1 | | 15 | 1 | 1898 | Warmley F.C. |
| 7 | (England) | J. Reynolds | W/IR | 12 | 5 | | | 2 | | 14 | 5 | 1898 | Gravesend |
| 3 | (England) | Adams | RW | 8 | 2 | 5 | | | | 13 | 2 | 1898 | - |
| 4 | (England) | James Bigden | RH/CH | 11 | | 2 | | | | 13 | | 1899 | - |
| 11 | (Scotland) | Patrick Leonard | LW | 10 | 7 | | | 2 | 1 | 12 | 8 | 1898 | Manchester City F.C. |
| 11 | (England) | Tom Bradshaw (Captain) | LW | 5 | | 7 | 2 | | | 12 | 2 | 1899 | Tottenham |
| 9 | (Scotland) | Henderson | CF/IL | 8 | 7 | | | 2 | 1 | 10 | 8 | 1898 | Warmley F.C. |
Other players with appearances
| 5 | (England) | McEwan | CH/RH | 8 | 2 | | | | | 8 | 2 | 1898 | - |
| 3 | (England) | Arthur Marjeram | FB | 8 | | | | | | 8 | | 1898 | Swanscombe F.C. |
| 9 | (Scotland) | Sam Hay | CF/IR | 6 | 2 | 1 | | | | 7+ | 2 | 1898 | Victoria |
| 11 | (England) | Len Walker | LW | 7 | | | | | | 7 | | 1899 | - |
| 10 | (England) | George Reid | IL/CF | 6 | 1 | | | | | 6 | 1 | 1898 | Warmley F.C. |
| 4 | (England) | Gilmore | D | 5 | 1 | | | | | 5 | 1 | 1898 | - |
| 5 | (England) | Alf Hitch | CH | 3 | | 2 | | | | 5 | | 1898 | Wellington Town |
| 11 | (England) | Cobb | LW | 2 | | 3 | | | | 5 | | 1898 | - |
| 5 | (England) | Frank Dandridge | CH | | | 4 | | | | 4+ | | 1896 | Reading |
| 8 | (England) | Edward Hatton | IR/CF | | | 4 | 1 | | | 4+ | 1 | 1896 | Reading |
| 5 | (England) | Turner | CH/U | 4 | | | | | | 4 | | 1899 | - |
| 2 | (England) | F. C. Chalkley | RB | | | 3 | | | | 3+ | | 1897 | Park Grove School |
| 11 | (England) | Edwards | LW | | | 3 | | | | 3+ | | 1897 | Thames Ironworks Employee |
| 1 | (England) | David Furnell | GK | | | 3 | | | | 3+ | | 1895 | Old Castle Swifts F.C. |
| 4 | (England) | George Neil | RH/LB | 2 | | 1 | | | | 3+ | | 1897 | West Norwood F.C. |
| 7 | (England) | Fred Corbett | RW | 3 | | | | | | 3 | | 1899 | - |
| 8 | (England) | Bird | IR | 1 | | 1 | | | | 2+ | | 1896 | Thames Ironworks Employee |
| 7 | (England) | Older | RW | | | 2 | | | | 2+ | | 1897 | Thames Ironworks Employee |
| 9 | (England) | Atkinson | CF | 2 | 2 | | | | | 2 | 2 | 1898 | - |
| 4 | (England) | Alec Gentle | RH/RW | 1 | | 1 | | | | 2 | | 1899 | New Brompton |
| 10 | (England) | Hounsell | IF | 2 | 1 | | | | | 2 | 1 | 1898 | - |
| 7 | (England) | Janes | RW | 2 | | | | | | 2 | | 1899 | - |
| 9 | (England) | Wenham | CF | 1 | 1 | | | | | 1 | 1 | 1898 | - |
| 11 | (England) | Darby | LW | | | 1 | | | | 1+ | | 1895 | Thames Ironworks Employee |
| 6 | (England) | Davie | LH | | | 1 | | | | 1+ | | 1896 | Reading |
| 10 | (England) | Freeman | IL | | | 1 | | | | 1+ | | 1895 | Thames Ironworks Employee |
| 5 | (England) | French | CH | | | 1 | | | | 1+ | | 1895 | Thames Ironworks Employee |
| 6 | (England) | Gillies | LH | | | 1 | | | | 1+ | | 1897 | Thames Ironworks Employee |
| 3 | (England) | Holstock | LB | | | 1 | | | | 1+ | | 1896 | Thames Ironworks Employee |
| 9 | (Scotland) | Jamie Lindsay | CF | | | 1 | | | | 1+ | | 1895 | Old Castle Swifts F.C. |
| 11 | (England) | Morrison | LW | | | 1 | | | | 1+ | | 1896 | Thames Ironworks Employee |
| 7 | (England) | Nicholls | RW | | | 1 | | | | 1+ | | 1896 | Thames Ironworks Employee |
| 6 | (Scotland) | Walter Parks | LH | | | 1 | | | | 1+ | | 1895 | Old Castle Swifts F.C. |
| 8 | (England) | H. Rossiter | IR | | | 1 | | | | 1+ | | 1896 | Reading |
| 8 | (England) | George Sage | IR | | | 1 | | | | 1+ | | 1895 | Old Castle Swifts F.C. |
| 1 | (England) | Southwood | GK | | | 1 | | | | 1+ | | 1896 | Thames Ironworks Employee |
| 2 | (Scotland) | Robert Stevenson (Captain) | RB | | | 1 | | | | 1+ | | 1895 | Old Castle Swifts F.C. |
| 4 | (England) | Stewart | RH | | | 1 | | | | 1+ | | 1895 | Thames Ironworks Employee |
| 3 | (England) | Taylor | LB | | | 1 | | | | 1+ | | 1897 | Thames Ironworks Employee |
| 2 | (England) | Tull | RB | | | 1 | | | | 1+ | | 1895 | Thames Ironworks Employee |
| 1 | (England) | Watson | GK | | | 1 | | | | 1+ | | 1895 | Thames Ironworks Employee |
| 3 | (England) | Williams | LB | | | 1 | | | | 1+ | | 1895 | Thames Ironworks Employee |
| 7 | (England) | John Thomas Archer Woods | RW | | | | | | | 1+ | | 1895 | Old Castle Swifts F.C. |
| 8 | (England) | Frank Brett | IR | 1 | | | | | | 1 | | 1898 | - |
| 11 | (England) | Buller | LW | 1 | | | | | | 1 | | 1898 | - |
| 11 | (England) | Foss | LW | 1 | | | | | | 1 | | 1898 | - |
| 1 | (England) | H. S. Sunderland | GK | 1 | | | | | | 1 | | 1898 | Millwall |
Other known players
| | (England) | Robert Heath | GK | | | | | | | 0+ | | 1897 | West Ham Garfield |
| | (England) | William Hickman | | | | | | | | 0+ | | 1895 | Old Castle Swifts F.C. |
| | (England) | Holmes | | | | | | | | 0+ | | 1896 | Reading |
| | (England) | Frank McCulloch | | | | | | | | 0+ | | 1895 | Old Castle Swifts F.C. |

== Record victories ==
- Southern League Division One:

Home: 4–0 v Chatham, 18 September 1899
Away: 3–0 v Sheppey United, 20 January 1900

- Southern League Division Two:

Home: 10–0 Maidenhead, 15 April 1899
Away: 4–0 Maidenhead F.C., 31 December 1898

- London League:

Home: 7–3 v Bromley, 15 January 1898
Away: 5–1 v Bromley F.C., 19 March 1898

- FA Cup:

Home: 6–1 v Royal Engineers, 23 September 1899
Away: 7–0 v Dartford, 28 October 1899

- Friendly:

Home: 7–1 v Lewisham St. Marys F.C., 28 December 1895
Away: 8–0 v Manor Park F.C., 28 September 1895

== Top appearance makers ==
- Most Appearances:

Tommy Moore (61) 1898–1900

- Most Appearances in a Season:

Roddy McEachrane (36) 1899–1900
Kenny McKay (36) 1899–1900

- Most FA Cup Appearances:

Charlie Dove (10) 1895–1900
Tommy Moore (10) 1898–1900

== Top goalscorers ==
- Top Scorer in a Season:

Bill Joyce (18) 1899–1900

- Top League Scorer in a Season:

David Lloyd (12) Southern League Division Two 1898–99

- Most Goals in One Match:

Henderson (4) v Uxbridge F.C. (h) 18 February 1899
Patrick Leonard (4) v Maidenhead (h) 15 April 1899
