= 1899–1900 Thames Ironworks F.C. season =

English football team season

Thames Ironworks
1899–1900 season
- Owner: Arnold Hills
- Club secretary: George Neil
- Stadium: Memorial Grounds
- Southern League Division One: 14th
- FA Cup: Fifth qualifying round
- Top goalscorer: League: Bill Joyce (8); Kenny McKay (8); Albert Carnelly (8); All: Bill Joyce (15)
- Highest home attendance: 13,000 v Millwall Athletic (23 December 1899)
Home colours

The 1899–1900 season was the last for Thames Ironworks before the club folded to be reformed as West Ham United.

== Kit ==
They adopted claret and blue 'uniforms' for the first time. Charlie Dove had got the kits for the club at a very cheap price of £3.10s. They had come from William Belton, who was a professional sprinter, as well as being one of the coaches at Thames Ironworks. During the summer of 1899, Belton had been at a fair in Birmingham, close to Villa Park, the home ground of Aston Villa. Belton had been challenged to a race against four Villa players, who wagered money that one of them would win. He defeated them, and when they were unable to pay the bet, one of the Villa players who was responsible for washing the team's kit offered a complete side's 'uniforms' to Belton in payment of the bet. The Aston Villa player subsequently reported to his club that the kit was 'missing'. Thames Ironworks, and West Ham United would continue to use their previous favoured colours of white, sky blue or navy for their away kit.

== Overview ==
To bolster the squad for their first season in Southern League Division One, Arnold Hills supplied a transfer fund of £1,000 (Note: Equivalent to £111,100 in today's pounds.) to club secretary Francis Payne, who chose to build the team by buying players already familiar with each other. From New Brompton he brought in right-half Alec Gentle and left-back Syd King who would go on to become West Ham United's first manager in 1902. Payne also raided Tottenham for three forward players, bringing in inside-right Kenny McKay, centre-forward Bill Joyce, who was described as having a "few fancy thrills" and left-winger Tom Bradshaw, who was appointed captain of the team. Bradshaw was a former England international, who holds the distinction of being Liverpool's first ever player to achieve international recognition. Players to leave in the club in the summer included the man Bradshaw had replaced in the team, Patrick Leonard, who returned to Manchester City. Walter Tranter was also sold to Chatham but he would return as a West Ham United player just a year later.

Whilst in pursuit of a Birmingham player, Francis Payne was accused by the Midlands club of illegally using an agent to tap up their player, and was charged with poaching by The Football Association. At the tribunal, The Football Association suspended the agent for two years, and Thames Ironworks for two weeks. The club also received a £25 fine. (Note: Equivalent to £2,778 in today's pounds.) Payne, who was absent from the proceedings, was suspended, and soon resigned his post as club secretary. He was replaced in the position by Irons defender George Neil, thus beginning a history of the team appointing from within.

Thames Ironworks lost their first fixture in the Southern League Division One 1–0 away at Reading on 16 September 1899, but managed their biggest league win of the season only two days later with 4–0 home win against Chatham. The game included two goals apiece for inside-forwards Albert Carnelly and new signing Kenny McKay. The Irons kept up their form for the FA Cup beating the amateur side, Royal Engineers at home 6–0 on 23 September, with a hat-trick from Bill Joyce, and a goal each from McKay, Roddy McEachrane and Jimmy Reid. A week later, Thames Ironworks featured in the next qualifying round of the FA Cup, this time beating Grays United 4–0 away, with goals from Joyce, McKay, Carnelly and centre-half Peter McManus.

During the third league match of season on 7 October, Tom Bradshaw sustained an injury in The Irons 1–0 home win over Bedminster that would begin a series of events that would see the condition of his health spiral downwards.

Thames Ironworks would see their good form continue in the third qualifying round of the FA Cup on 14 October, finally claiming the scalp of Sheppey United with a 4–2 home win that included two goals from Carnelly and two from Joyce. The fourth qualifying round followed two weeks later and The Irons recorded their biggest win of the season, trouncing Dartford away 7–0. There were braces for Carnelly and McKay, as well as a goal each for Joyce, McEachrane and Bradshaw.

However, The Irons good form soon ended on 4 November when in a league game they lost 7–0 at White Hart Lane to Tottenham. The indignation was increased by the fact that it was also their highest away attendance that season with 7,000 people at the game. Thames Ironworks managed to steady the ship with a 0–0 home draw against New Brompton on 11 November, in what would be Tom Bradshaw's last league game ever.

Only a week later, The Irons then had to play New Brompton again, this time away and in the next qualifying round of the FA Cup. The teams again served up a 0–0 draw and a replay was scheduled for the following week. On 23 November Thames Ironworks managed to break New Brompton's resolve, winning 2–0 with goals from Carnelly and McKay, setting up a next round tie against arch rivals Millwall Athletic. The clearly ailing Tom Bradshaw was rested for the next two games, in preparation for the tie against Millwall which was to follow 16 days later. The Irons league form continued to be erratic in those next two games with a 1–0 home win over Swindon being closely followed by 0–2 loss away at Bristol City.

The Irons' 9 December FA Cup game at home to Millwall attracted their biggest attendance of the season with 13,000 spectators making the fifth qualifying round tie. Captain Tom Bradshaw, after being absent for the previous two games got the only goal in a 1–2 defeat. This would be his last game for the club. Thames Ironworks lost again at home to Millwall on 23 December, this time in the Southern League and by two goals to nil. Again, another above average crowd of 12/000 were attracted to a game between these two London rivals. This loss was followed two days later by a Christmas Day 0–2 defeat against Queens Park Rangers. Also on 25 December, after lengthy illness, club captain Tom Bradshaw died. His cause of death was recorded as consumption. His passing was remembered by future West Ham manager Syd King, in his brief history of the club:

"The record of 1899–1900, however, would not be complete without some reference to poor Tom Bradshaw, who came from Spurs with Joyce. How well I remember that match with Queens Park Rangers during the Christmas holidays, when Joyce brought over the sad message to the Memorial Grounds that our comrade had died. Poor Tom was one of the cleverest wing forwards I have ever known and he was immensely popular with everybody." – Syd King, 'Book Of Football' (1906)

The disillusioned Thames Ironworks team would record seven successive defeats until 15 January 1900, when they drew away at Bristol Rovers 1–1, with Kenny McKay getting the all-important goal. The Irons managed to follow this up with a 3–0 win over Sheppey on 20 January, with goals coming from McKay, Carnelly and Joyce. A further four wins and three draws were just enough for Thames ironworks to avoid bottom place, and much of the credit for that should go to their forwards McKay, Carnelly and Joyce, who between them scored 90% of The Irons' goals.

The Irons won the last three games of the season. The first of these was on 9 April against the previous season's Southern League Division One champions Southampton, who had just reached the FA Cup Final and were sitting in third place in the division. Against the odds, Thames Ironworks recorded a 4–1 win with Bill Joyce's second hat-trick of the season and a goal from right-winger Bob Allan. On 17 April, The Irons completed the double over bottom club Sheppey United by a 4–2 margin. This time the goals came from McKay, Joyce, Taylor and an own goal. The last game of the season arrived on 28 April when, at the third time of asking that season, The Irons beat Millwall away 1–0 with a goal from Ken McKay. Thames Ironworks finished 14 out of 15 in the Southern League Division One and would be required to play a Test Match to preserve their divisional status. Only two days later at a game held at Tottenham's White Hart Lane Ground, The Irons faced a Fulham team featuring former centre-forward David Lloyd. Although only 600 fans turned up, Thames Ironworks won 5–1, with Bill Joyce claiming his third hat-trick of the season at his former stomping ground. The other goals came from centre-half Willie Stewart and an own goal. Thames Ironworks had survived their first season in the top division of the Southern League and their reserve team had also begun to gain ground, finishing fourth of ten in the London League Division One.

Bill Joyce and Roddy McEachrane were ever-presents during the 1899–1900 season with 36 appearances each. Bill Joyce, Kenny McKay and Albert Carnelly all scored 8 goals in the Southern League Division One, with Joyce getting a further 10 in FA Cup and Test Match games.

== Resignation from the league ==
In June 1900, club chairman Arnold Hill's Thames Ironworks and Shipbuilding Company acquired another engineering firm in financial takeover and became a limited company for the first time. 4,000 ten shilling shares (50p) (Note: Equivalent to £53 in today's pounds.) were sold to Iron Works staff and the general public, with Hills generous enough to match sales of any shares one-to-one. At the end of June, Thames Ironworks F.C. resigned from the Southern League and were officially wound up. On 5 July 1900 they reformed under the new name of West Ham United F.C. and accepted an offer of the Southern League place left vacant by Thames Ironworks. Lew Bowen, a Welsh clerk at the Iron Works Company was appointed as the first West Ham United club secretary. Bowen had previously written Thames Ironworks match reports for the Thames Iron Works Gazette, also known as TIWG. He would retain twelve Thames Ironworks players for the following season. These included goalkeeper Tommy Moore, full-backs Syd King and Charlie Craig, wing-halves Charlie Dove, Roddy McEachrane and James Bigden, left-wingers Frank Taylor and Len Walker and right-wingers Bob Allan and Fred Corbett. Former club secretary and Ironworks defender George Neil was also retained for the new season ahead. Tom Bradshaw's close friends Bill Joyce and Kenny McKay left for Portsmouth and Fulham respectively, while Albert Carnelly joined arch-rivals Millwall.

== Statistics ==
No.		Player	Pos	S Lg Apps	S Lg Gls	FA Apps	FA Gls	Test Apps	Test Gls	Total Apps	Total Gls	Date signed	Previous club
Thames Ironworks F.C. 1899–1900 First XI (Most Appearances)
1	(England)	Tommy Moore	GK	27		7		1		35		1898	Millwall
2	(Scotland)	Tommy Dunn	RB	21		7		1		29		1898	Chatham F.C.
3	(England)	Syd King	LB	16		7				23		1899	New Brompton
4	(England)	Charlie Dove	RH	15		5		1		21		1895	South West Ham
5	(Scotland)	Willie Stewart	CH	16				1	1	17	1	1899	Luton
6	(Scotland)	Roddy McEachrane	LH	28		7	2	1		36	2	1898	Thames Ironworks Employee
7	(Scotland)	Bob Allan	RW	21	1			1		22	1	1899	Dundee
8	(Scotland)	Kenny McKay	IR	28	8	7	5	1		36	13	1899	Tottenham Hotspur
9	(Scotland)	Bill Joyce	CF	27	8	7	7	1	3	35	18	1899	Tottenham Hotspur
10	(England)	Albert Carnelly	IL	27	8	6	6	1		34	14	1899	Bristol City
11	(England)	Frank Taylor	LW	14	1			1		15	1	1899	Harwich
Players with 8+ appearances
2	(Scotland)	Charlie Craig	FB/WH	17		4		1		22		1899	Dundee
4	(England)	James Bigden	RH/CH	11		2				13		1899	-
11	(England)	Tom Bradshaw (captain)	LW	5		7	2			12	2	1899	Tottenham Hotspur
5	(Scotland)	Peter McManus	CH	5		4	1			9	1	1898	Warmley F.C.
3	(England)	F.T. Adams	LB/RW	6	1	2				8	1	1898	-
Other players with appearances
11	(England)	Len Walker	LW	7						7		1899	-
4	(England)	Henry Gilmore	RH	4						4		1898	-
7	(England)	Henry Hird	RW	1		3				4		1897	Stockton F.C.
5	(England)	Robert Turner	CH/U	4						4		1899	-
7	(England)	Fred Corbett	RW	3						3		1899	-
10	(Scotland)	Jimmy Reid	IL	1		1	1			2	1	1897	Reading
4	(England)	Alec Gentle	RH/RW	1		1				2		1899	New Brompton
7	(England)	W. Janes	RW	2						2		1899	-
1	(England)	H. S. Sunderland	GK	1						1		1898	Millwall

== Bibliography ==
- Belton, Brian (2006). West Ham United Miscellany. Pennant Books. ISBN 0-9550394-4-4.
- Blows, Kirk; Hogg, Tony (2000). The Essential History of West Ham United. Headline. ISBN 0-7472-7036-8.
- Powles, John (2005). Iron in the Blood. Nottingham: Soccerdata. ISBN 1-899468-22-6. Archived from the original on 12 January 2018.
