= 1898–99 Thames Ironworks F.C. season =

English football team season

The 1898–99 season was Thames Ironworks' fourth season after the club's formation in 1895.

Thames Ironworks F.C. 1898–1899

During the summer of 1898, Thames Ironworks became a professional outfit for the first time, to match their new status as new members of the Southern League. It was a decision reluctantly taken by Ironworks chairman Arnold Hills, who had always believed in the classical ideal of competitive sport being for its own sake. But with the success the club had been enjoying, together with the increased crowds at their Memorial Grounds venue, he relented, and was quoted as saying "It may be necessary to introduce a little ferment of professional experience to leaven the heavy lump."

New signings came thick and fast and included the controversial capture of goalkeeper Tommy Moore from arch-rivals Millwall. This meant that there would be no place for keeper David Furnell in the squad, and he was allowed to transfer to Hammersmith Athletic. The team further strengthened defensively with the signing of George Neil from West Norwood, full-backs Tommy Dunn and Arthur Marjeram from Chatham and Swanscombe respectively and Scottish left-half Roddy McEachrane, who had played for Inverness Thistle alongside Irons wing-half Simon Chisholm, and had also worked at the actual Thames Iron Works. Thames Ironworks raided Warmley of three of the players, with centre half Peter McManus, along with forwards George Reid and Henderson all making the journey east. The team's attacking options were further increased with the signings of wingers J. Reynolds from Gravesend and Patrick Leonard from Manchester City, along with the snaring of centre forward David Lloyd from former rivals 3rd Grenadier Guards.

They kicked off the season on 10 September 1898 away to Shepherd's Bush, and were in fine form, beating the West London outfit 3–0, with two goals from Atkinson and one from Adams. The form continued with a 3–1 home win over Brentford a fortnight later, and a 2–0 FA Cup 1st qualifying round win soon followed when "The Irons" were again pitted against Royal Engineers Training Battalion.

October proved to be Thames Ironworks' difficult month during the season, when they failed to record a single win. They first lost away to Uxbridge 1–2, before facing Brighton United in the second qualifying round of the FA Cup. The Irons drew 0–0 away to the south coast, before losing the replay four days later 1–4, with the only goal being scored by Henry Hird. The month ended farcically when in a Southern League game on 29 October, they faced a Wycombe side who had lost their previous five matches. The Irons missed their train and arrives at the Buckinghamshire's Loakes Park ground an hour late. The obviously unsettled side eventually played the game in torrential rain and were two goals down after 15 minutes from goals scored by Jim Aldridge. Aldridge had completed his hat-trick by half time. Wycombe were 4–0 ahead before irons inside-forward Jimmy Reid pulled one back in the 88th minute.

This was to be Thames Ironworks' last defeat of the season, and they could go on to win an impressive 17 of their last 18 games, only drawing away at Watford 0–0. The year ended with The Irons biggest win of the season so far, in an away game against Maidenhead on 31 December 1898, which Thames Ironworks won 4–0. It was in this game that Charlie Dove completed the distinction of playing in every position for the club when he deputised for goalkeeper Tommy Moore, and it is perhaps even more impressive that he managed to keep a clean sheet.

Thames Ironworks played their first game of the new year at the Memorial Grounds on 14 January 1899, when they entertained Wycombe. This time, the Wycombe goalkeeper Ernie Wheeler missed the train, and the team began the game with only ten players on the pitch. Their full-back Henry Turner began in goal, and had soon conceded an own goal from one of his defenders. A Wycombe fan, who often filled in for them when they were unexpectedly short, took over as goalkeeper, but he was also soon beaten by a low shot from Irons centre-half McEwan. Irons centre forward David Lloyd then missed two chances, before grabbing a brace to put The Irons 4–0 up by half-time. The second half saw two penalties, one missed by Lloyd and one scored by Wycombe player Fred Keen, to make the final score 4–1 and a complete reverse of the scoreline in their previous encounter. Their great form would continue for the rest of the season, including a thrilling 4–3 win away to Wolverton London & North Western Railway, which also saw their lowest attendance of only 200, and an 8–1 home win over Chesham Town

Already confirmed as Southern League Division Two champions, having won the previous 14 games, Thames Ironworks showed little restraint for the final game of the season against Maidenhead on 15 April 1898. With their largest home crowd of the season, 3000 spectators saw The Irons demolish the bottom club of the division 10–0. The goals included four from Patrick Leonard, a hat-trick from David Lloyd and a brace from Jimmy Reid. The other goal was scored by Henderson.

Although they won the Southern League Second Division by 9 points, Thames Ironworks were required to play Test Matches to decide their promotion to Division One. The first came against Cowes from the Isle of Wight on 22 April. They had qualified for the Test Match by winning the South West section of the league structure, and the game was played at the supposedly neutral East Ferry Road ground of Irons' rivals Millwall. A 10,000 strong crowd saw Thames Ironworks win the game 3–1, with goals coming from David Lloyd, Patrick Leonard and Henderson. The Ironworks then had to face Sheppey United, who had finished 12th in the 13 team Southern League Division One, and had beaten The Irons two and a half years previously 8–0 in an FA Cup game. The game took place at Chatham's ground on 29 April and finished 1–1, with David Lloyd once again the goalscorer.

Before a replay could be staged, it was decided to enlarge the top division of the Southern League to 19 teams, thus enabling Thames Ironworks F.C., as well as Sheppey United, Bristol Rovers and Q.P.R. to join the higher tier.

Roddy McEachrane was the only ever-present in the team during the season, making 27 appearances.

The top goalscorer was David Lloyd with 14 goals. 12 of these were scored in the Southern League, with the other two coming in the Test Matches against Cowes and Sheppey.

== Squad ==
No.		Player	Pos	S Lg Apps	S Lg Gls	FA Apps	FA Gls	Ch/T Apps	Ch/T Gls	Total Apps	Total Gls	Date signed	Previous club
Thames Ironworks F.C. 1898–99 First XI (Most Appearances)
1	(England)	Tommy Moore	GK	21		3		2		26		1898	Millwall
2	(England)	Walter Tranter (Captain)	RB	20		3		2		25		1897	Thames Ironworks Employee
3	(Scotland)	Tommy Dunn	LB	11				2		13		1898	Chatham
4	(Scotland)	Simon Chisholm	RH	15	1	3		2		20	1	1897	Inverness
5	(England)	Charlie Dove	D	14	3	2		1		17	3	1895	Thames Ironworks Employee
6	(Scotland)	Roddy McEachrane	LH	22	1	3	1	2		27	2	1898	Thames Ironworks Employee
7	(England)	Henry Hird	RW	19	3	3	1			22	4	1897	Stockton
8	(Scotland)	Jimmy Reid	IR	13	9			1		14	9	1897	Reading
9	(England)	David Lloyd	CF	11	12	3		2	2	16	14	1898	3rd Grenadier Guards
10	(England)	George Gresham	IL	14	4	3	1	1		18	5	1896	Gainsborough Trinity
11	(England)	Patrick Leonard	LW	10	7			2	1	12	8	1898	Manchester City
Players with 6+ appearances
7	(England)	J. Reynolds	W/IR	12	5			2		14	5	1898	Gravesend
9	(Scotland)	R. Henderson	CF/IL	8	7			2	1	10	8	1898	Warmley
5	(England)	L. McEwan	CH/RH	8	2					8	2	1898	-
3	(England)	Arthur Marjeram	FB	8						8		1898	Swanscombe
9	(Scotland)	Sam Hay	CF/IR	6	2	1				7	2	1898	Victoria
10	(England)	George Reid	IL/CF	6	1					6	1	1898	Warmley
5	(Scotland)	Peter McManus	CH	5				1		6		1898	Warmley
Other players with appearances
9	(England)	F.T. Adams	CF/IL	2	1	3				5	1	1898	-
5	(England)	Alf Hitch	CH	3		2				5		1898	Wellington Town
11	(England)	R. Cobb	LW/IL	2		3				5		1898	-
4	(England)	George Neil	RH/LB	2		1				3		1897	West Norwood F.C.
9	(England)	W. Atkinson	CF	2	2					2	2	1898	-
10	(England)	Robert Hounsell	IF	2	1					2	1	1898	-
9	(England)	Wenham	CF	1	1					1	1	1898	Thames Ironworks Employee
8	(England)	Richard Bird	IR	1						1		1896	Thames Ironworks Employee
8	(England)	Frank Brett	IR	1						1		1898	Thames Ironworks Employee
11	(England)	Buller	LW	1						1		1898	-
11	(England)	L. Foss	LW	1						1		1898	-
11	(England)	Henry Gilmore	LW	1	1					1	1	1898	

== See also ==
- West Ham United F.C.

== Bibliography ==
- Belton, Brian (2006). West Ham United Miscellany. Pennant Books. ISBN 0-9550394-4-4.
- Blows, Kirk; Hogg, Tony (2000). The Essential History of West Ham United. Headline. ISBN 0-7472-7036-8.
- Powles, John (2005). Iron in the Blood. Nottingham: Soccerdata. ISBN 1-899468-22-6. Archived from the original on 12 January 2018.
