= List of West Ham United F.C. seasons =

West Ham won the league War Cup in 1940

Graph of West Ham seasons

These are the seasons of Thames Ironworks (1895–1900) and West Ham United from their year of formation to their most recent season. The club first competed in The Football League in 1919.

== League seasons ==
Season	League									FA Cup	EFL Cup (Note: The EFL Cup was first contested in the 1960–61 season.)	Europe / Other		Top goalscorer(s) (Note: Goals in all competitions (English Football League or Premier League, FA Cup, EFL Cup, European and FA Charity Shield/Community Shield) are counted.)	
Season	Division	Pld	W	D	L	GF	GA	Pts	Pos	FA Cup	EFL Cup	Europe / Other		Player(s)	Goals
1895–96										1Q		West Ham Charity Cup	W	George Gresham	10
1896–97	LL	12	7	2	3	17	17	16	2nd	1Q		West Ham Charity Cup	RU	George Gresham	2
1897–98	LL	16	12	3	1	47	15	27	1st	2Q				George Gresham	12
1898–99	SL Div 2	22	19	1	2	64	16	39	1st	2Q				David Lloyd	14
1899–1900	SL Div 1	28	8	5	15	30	45	21	14th	5Q				Bill Joyce	18
1900–01	SL Div 1	28	14	5	9	40	28	33	6th	R1				Billy Grassam	15
1901–02	SL Div 1	30	17	6	7	45	28	40	4th	4Q				Billy Grassam George Ratcliffe	10
1902–03	SL Div 1	30	9	10	11	35	49	28	10th	R1				Billy Grassam	19
1903–04	SL Div 1	34	10	7	17	38	43	27	12th	R1				Charlie Satterthwaite	18
1904–05	SL Div 1	34	12	8	14	48	42	32	10th	6Q				Billy Bridgeman	11
1905–06	SL Div 1	34	14	5	15	42	39	33	11th	R1				Harry Stapley	9
1906–07	SL Div 1	38	15	14	9	60	41	44	5th	R2				Harry Stapley	22
1907–08	SL Div 1	38	15	10	13	47	48	40	10th	R2				Harry Stapley	10
1908–09	SL Div 1	40	16	4	20	56	60	36	18th	R3				Danny Shea	20
1909–10	SL Div 1	42	15	15	12	69	56	45	9th	R3				Danny Shea	31
1910–11	SL Div 1	38	17	11	10	63	46	45	5th	R4				Danny Shea	28
1911–12	SL Div 1	38	13	7	18	64	69	33	13th	R3				Danny Shea	24
1912–13	SL Div 1	38	18	12	8	66	46	48	3rd	R2				George Hilsdon	17
1913–14	SL Div 1	38	15	12	11	61	60	42	6th	R3				Dick Leafe	21
1914–15	SL Div 1	38	18	9	11	58	47	45	4th	R1				Syd Puddefoot	18
No competitive football was played between 1915 and 1919 due to World War I
1919–20	Div 2	42	19	9	14	47	40	47	7th	R5				Syd Puddefoot	26
1920–21	Div 2	42	19	10	13	51	30	48	5th	R1				Syd Puddefoot	29
1921–22	Div 2	42	20	8	14	52	39	48	4th	R2				Syd Puddefoot	14
1922–23	Div 2	42	20	11	11	63	38	51	2nd	RU				Vic Watson	27
1923–24	Div 1	42	13	15	14	40	43	41	13th	R2				Billy Moore	10
1924–25	Div 1	42	15	12	15	62	60	42	13th	R5				Vic Watson	23
1925–26	Div 1	42	15	7	20	63	76	37	18th	R3				Vic Watson	20
1926–27	Div 1	42	19	8	15	86	70	46	6th	R4				Vic Watson	14
1927–28	Div 1	42	14	11	17	81	88	39	17th	R4				Jimmy Ruffell	19
1928–29	Div 1	42	15	9	18	86	96	39	17th	QF				Vic Watson	30
1929–30	Div 1	42	19	5	18	86	79	43	7th	QF				Vic Watson	50
1930–31	Div 1	42	14	8	20	79	94	36	18th	R3				Vivian Gibbins	19
1931–32	Div 1	42	12	7	23	62	107	31	22nd	R4				Vic Watson	25
1932–33	Div 2	42	13	9	20	75	93	35	20th	SF				Vic Watson	28
1933–34	Div 2	42	17	11	14	78	70	45	7th	R4				Vic Watson	29
1934–35	Div 2	42	26	4	12	80	51	56	3rd	R3				Jimmy Ruffell	20
1935–36	Div 2	42	22	8	12	90	68	52	4th	R3				Dave Mangnall	24
1936–37	Div 2	42	19	11	12	73	55	49	6th	R3				Len Goulden	15
1937–38	Div 2	42	14	14	14	53	52	42	9th	R3				Stan Foxall Archie Macaulay	10
1938–39	Div 2	42	17	10	15	70	52	44	11th	R5				Stan Foxall	19
No competitive football was played between 1939 and 1946 due to World War II
1945–46	N/A									R4				Almer Hall	19
1946–47	Div 2	42	16	8	18	70	76	40	12th	R3				Frank Neary	15
1947–48	Div 2	42	16	14	12	55	53	44	6th	R3				Eric Parsons	12
1948–49	Div 2	42	18	10	14	56	58	46	7th	R3				Ken Wright	11
1949–50	Div 2	42	12	12	18	53	61	36	19th	R4				Bill Robinson	24
1950–51	Div 2	42	16	10	16	68	69	42	13th	R4				Bill Robinson	29
1951–52	Div 2	42	15	11	16	67	78	41	12th	R4				Bert Hawkins	15
1952–53	Div 2	42	13	13	16	58	60	39	14th	R3				Fred Kearns	12
1953–54	Div 2	42	15	9	18	67	69	39	13th	R4				Tommy Dixon	19
1954–55	Div 2	42	18	10	14	74	70	46	8th	R3				John Dick	26
1955–56	Div 2	42	14	11	17	74	69	39	16th	QF				Billy Dare	25
1956–57	Div 2	42	19	8	15	59	63	46	8th	R4				John Dick	13
1957–58	Div 2	42	23	11	8	101	54	57	1st	R5				John Dick	26
1958–59	Div 1	42	21	6	15	85	70	48	6th	R3				John Dick	30
1959–60	Div 1	42	16	6	20	75	91	38	14th	R3				Malcolm Musgrove	20
1960–61	Div 1	42	13	10	19	77	88	36	16th	R3	R2			John Dick	19
1961–62	Div 1	42	17	10	15	76	82	44	8th	R3	R2			John Dick	23
1962–63	Div 1	42	14	12	16	73	69	40	12th	QF	R2			Geoff Hurst	15
1963–64	Div 1	42	14	12	16	69	74	40	14th	W	SF			Johnny Byrne	33
1964–65	Div 1	42	19	4	19	82	71	42	9th	R4	R2	Charity Shield	Shared	Johnny Byrne	30
1964–65	Div 1	42	19	4	19	82	71	42	9th	R4	R2	Cup Winners' Cup	W	Johnny Byrne	30
1965–66	Div 1	42	15	9	18	70	83	39	12th	R4	RU	Cup Winners' Cup	SF	Geoff Hurst	40
1966–67	Div 1	42	14	8	20	80	84	36	16th	R3	SF			Geoff Hurst	41
1967–68	Div 1	42	14	10	18	73	69	38	12th	R5	R4			Geoff Hurst	25
1968–69	Div 1	42	13	18	11	66	50	44	8th	R5	R3			Geoff Hurst	31
1969–70	Div 1	42	12	12	18	51	60	36	17th	R3	R3			Geoff Hurst	18
1970–71	Div 1	42	10	14	18	47	60	34	20th	R3	R3			Geoff Hurst	16
1971–72	Div 1	42	12	12	18	47	51	36	14th	R5	SF			Clyde Best	23
1972–73	Div 1	42	17	12	13	67	53	46	6th	R4	R3			Pop Robson	28
1973–74	Div 1	42	11	15	16	55	60	37	18th	R3	R2			Clyde Best Billy Bonds	13
1974–75	Div 1	42	13	13	16	58	59	39	13th	W	R3	Texaco Cup	GS	Billy Jennings	14
1975–76	Div 1	42	13	10	19	48	61	36	18th	R3	R4	Charity Shield	RU	Alan Taylor	17
1975–76	Div 1	42	13	10	19	48	61	36	18th	R3	R4	Cup Winners' Cup	RU	Alan Taylor	17
1976–77	Div 1	42	11	14	17	46	65	36	17th	R4	R4			Pop Robson	14
1977–78	Div 1	42	12	8	22	52	69	32	20th	R4	R2			Pop Robson	11
1978–79	Div 2	42	18	14	10	70	39	50	5th	R3	R2			Pop Robson	26
1979–80	Div 2	42	20	7	15	54	43	47	7th	W	QF			David Cross	18
1980–81	Div 2	42	28	10	4	79	29	66	1st	R3	RU	Charity Shield	RU	David Cross	32
1980–81	Div 2	42	28	10	4	79	29	66	1st	R3	RU	Cup Winners' Cup	QF	David Cross	32
1981–82	Div 1	42	14	16	12	66	57	58 (Note: The 1981–82 season saw the introduction of three points for a win.)	9th	R4	R3			David Cross	19
1982–83	Div 1	42	20	4	18	68	62	64	8th	R3	QF			Paul Goddard François Van der Elst	12
1983–84	Div 1	42	17	9	16	60	55	60	9th	R5	R4			Tony Cottee	19
1984–85	Div 1	42	13	12	17	51	68	51	16th	QF	R3			Tony Cottee	24
1985–86	Div 1	42	26	6	10	74	40	84	3rd	QF	R3			Frank McAvennie	28
1986–87	Div 1	42	14	10	18	52	67	52	15th	QF	R5	Full Members' Cup	R3	Tony Cottee	29
1987–88	Div 1	40	9	15	16	40	52	42	16th	R4	R3	Full Members' Cup	R1	Tony Cottee	15
1988–89	Div 1	38	10	8	20	37	62	38	19th	QF	SF	Full Members' Cup	R2	Leroy Rosenior	15
1989–90	Div 2	46	20	12	14	80	57	72	7th	R3	SF	Full Members' Cup	R3	Julian Dicks	14
1990–91	Div 2	46	24	15	7	60	34	87	2nd	SF	R3	Full Members' Cup	R1	Trevor Morley	17
1991–92	Div 1	42	9	11	22	37	59	38	22nd	R5	R4	Full Members' Cup	QF	Mike Small	18
1992–93	Div 1 (Note: Seasons prior to 1992–93 are the old league format, with Division 1 as the top flight. From 1992–93 onward is the present system with the Premier League as the highest level.)	46	26	10	10	81	41	88	2nd	R4	R2	Anglo-Italian Cup	GS	Trevor Morley	22
1993–94	Prem	42	13	13	16	47	58	52	13th	QF	R3			Trevor Morley	16
1994–95	Prem	42	13	11	18	44	48	50	14th	R4	R4			Tony Cottee	15
1995–96	Prem	38	14	9	15	43	52	51	10th	R4	R3			Tony Cottee	12
1996–97	Prem	38	10	12	16	39	48	42	14th	R3	R4			Julian Dicks Paul Kitson	8
1997–98	Prem	38	16	8	14	56	57	56	8th	QF	QF			John Hartson	24
1998–99	Prem	38	16	9	13	46	53	57	5th	R3	R2			Ian Wright	9
1999–2000	Prem	38	15	10	13	52	53	55	9th	R3	QF	Intertoto Cup	W	Paolo Di Canio	17
1999–2000	Prem	38	15	10	13	52	53	55	9th	R3	QF	UEFA Cup	R2	Paolo Di Canio	17
2000–01	Prem	38	10	12	16	45	50	42	15th	QF	R4			Frédéric Kanouté	14
2001–02	Prem	38	15	8	15	48	57	53	7th	R4	R2			Jermain Defoe	14
2002–03	Prem	38	10	12	16	42	59	42	18th	R4	R3			Jermain Defoe	11
2003–04	Div 1	46	19	17	10	67	45	74	4th	R5	R3			Jermain Defoe	15
2004–05	Champ	46	21	10	15	66	56	73	6th (Note: Promoted via the play-offs.)	R4	R3			Marlon Harewood	22
2005–06	Prem	38	16	7	15	52	55	55	9th	RU	R3			Marlon Harewood	16
2006–07	Prem	38	12	5	21	35	59	41	15th	R4	R3	UEFA Cup	R1	Bobby Zamora	11
2007–08	Prem	38	13	10	15	42	50	49	10th	R3	QF			Dean Ashton	11
2008–09	Prem	38	14	9	15	42	45	51	9th	R5	R3			Carlton Cole	11
2009–10	Prem	38	8	11	19	47	66	35	17th	R3	R3			Carlton Cole	10
2010–11	Prem	38	7	12	19	43	70	33	20th	QF	SF			Carlton Cole	11
2011–12	Champ	46	24	14	8	81	48	86	3rd	R3	R1			Carlton Cole	15
2012–13	Prem	38	12	10	16	45	53	46	10th	R3	R3			Kevin Nolan	10
2013–14	Prem	38	11	7	20	40	51	40	13th	R3	SF			Kevin Nolan	7
2014–15	Prem	38	12	11	15	44	47	47	12th	R5	R2			Diafra Sakho	11
2015–16	Prem	38	16	14	8	65	51	62	7th	QF	R3	Europa League	3Q	Dimitri Payet	12
2016–17	Prem	38	12	9	17	47	64	45	11th	R3	QF	Europa League	PO	Michail Antonio	9
2017–18	Prem	38	10	12	16	48	68	42	13th	R4	QF			Marko Arnautović	11
2018–19	Prem	38	15	7	16	52	55	52	10th	R4	R4			Marko Arnautović	11
2019–20	Prem	38	10	9	19	41	62	39	16th	R4	R3			Michail Antonio	10
2020–21	Prem	38	19	8	11	62	47	65	6th	R5	R4			Michail Antonio Tomáš Souček	10
2021–22	Prem	38	16	8	14	60	51	56	7th	R5	QF	Europa League	SF	Jarrod Bowen	18
2022–23	Prem	38	11	7	20	42	55	40	14th	R5	R3	Conference League	W	Michail Antonio	14
2023–24	Prem	38	14	10	14	60	74	52	9th	R3	QF	Europa League	QF	Jarrod Bowen	20
2024–25	Prem	38	11	10	17	46	62	43	14th	R3	R3			Jarrod Bowen	14
2025–26	Prem	38	10	9	19	46	65	39	18th	QF	R2			Jarrod Bowen	11

== Key ==
- Pld – Matches played
- W – Matches won
- D – Matches drawn
- L – Matches lost
- GF – Goals for
- GA – Goals against
- Pts – Points
- Pos – Final position
- LL – London League
- SL – Southern League
- Div 1 – Football League First Division
- Div 2 – Football League Second Division
- Prem – Premier League
- Champ – Football League Championship
- n/a – Not applicable
- Q1 – First qualifying round
- Q2 – Second qualifying round etc.
- PO – Play-off round
- GS – Group stage
- R1 – Round 1
- R2 – Round 2
- R3 – Round 3
- R4 – Round 4
- R5 – Round 5
- QF – Quarter-finals
- SF – Semi-finals
- RU – Runners-up
- W – Winners

Winners	Runners-up	Third place	Play-offs	Promoted	Relegated
