= 1898–99 Tottenham Hotspur F.C. season =

English football club season

Tottenham Hotspur
1898–99 season
- Manager: Frank Brettell
- Stadium: Northumberland Park
- Southern League: 7th
- United League: 4th
- Thames & Medway League: 4th
- FA Cup: 3rd round
- Top goalscorer: John Cameron (11)

The 1898–99 season was Tottenham's third season as a fully professional club and the 16th year in existence. They competed in three leagues this season along with a long run in the FA Cup. In the Southern League Tottenham finished in 7th place. This was the clubs final appearance in the United League where they finished in fourth place. This was also the only season that Tottenham played in the Thames & Medway League.

In the FA Cup Tottenham played Luton Town three times finally managing to beat them 2–0 at Tufnell Park. Making it through the first round with two games played against Newton Heath (Who later became Manchester United). The second round saw a home tie against Sunderland which Tottenham over come to progress to the third round to face Stoke only to lose 4–1.

== Squad ==
Note: Flags indicate national team as defined under FIFA eligibility rules; some limited exceptions apply. Players may hold more than one non-FIFA nationality.

Pos.	Nation	Player
GK	ENG	Charles Ambler
GK	SCO	Joseph Cullen
GK	RSA	Wilf Waller
DF	SCO	Edwin Downie
DF	SCO	Alex Hall
DF	SCO	Harry Erentz
DF	SCO	Robert Cain
DF	ENG	Jimmy Melia
MF	ENG	Tom Smith
MF	WAL	Jack Jones
MF	ENG	Ernest Payne

Pos.	Nation	Player
MF	SCO	Robert Stormont
MF	SCO	James McNaught
FW	SCO	Kenny McKay
FW	ENG	Harry Bradshaw
FW	ENG	Thomas Meade
FW	ENG	Tommy Atherton
FW	SCO	Bill Joyce
FW	SCO	Jimmy Hartley
FW	SCO	John Cameron
FW	ENG	Arthur Rule

== Transfers ==
=== In ===
Date from	Position	Nationality	Name	From	Fee	Ref.
May 1898	Forward	(Scotland)	John Cameron		Unknown	
May 1898	Forward	(England)	Tommy Atherton		Unknown	
May 1898	Forward	(Scotland)	Robert Cain		Unknown	

=== Out ===
Date from	Position	Nationality	Name	To	Fee	Ref.
December 1898	Forward	(Scotland)	James Davidson	Brighton United	Released	
1898	Full back	(England)	Joe Knowles	Sunderland	Released	

== Competitions ==
=== Southern League ===
==== Table ====
Pos	Team	Pld	W	D	L	GF	GA	GR	Pts
5	Reading	24	9	8	7	31	24	1.292	26
6	New Brompton	24	10	5	9	38	30	1.267	25
7	Tottenham Hotspur	24	10	4	10	40	36	1.111	24
8	Bedminster	24	10	4	10	35	39	0.897	24
9	Swindon Town	24	9	5	10	43	49	0.878	23

Source: rsssf.com
Rules for classification: The system of using goal average to separate two teams tied on points was used until the 1976-77 season. The points system: 2 points for a win, 1 point for a draw and 0 points for losing.

==== Results ====
10 September 1898 1	Tottenham Hotspur	1–1	Bedminster	Tottenham, London
				Stadium: Northumberland Park

17 September 1898 2	Tottenham Hotspur	3–2	Sheppey United	Tottenham, London
				Stadium: Northumberland Park

24 September 1898 3	Tottenham Hotspur	7–1; Game was void after Warmley resigned from the league.	Warmley	Tottenham, London
				Stadium: Northumberland Park

8 October 1898 4	Tottenham Hotspur	2–0	Chatham	Tottenham, London
				Stadium: Northumberland Park

22 October 1898 5	Millwall Athletic	4–2	Tottenham Hotspur	Isle of Dogs, London
				Stadium: The Athletic Grounds

5 November 1898 6	Tottenham Hotspur	3–0	Reading	Tottenham, London
				Stadium: Northumberland Park

26 November 1898 7	Royal Artillery Portsmouth	2–3	Tottenham Hotspur	Portsmouth
				Stadium: United Services Recreation Ground

3 December 1898 8	Bristol City	2–1	Tottenham Hotspur	Bristol, Gloucestershire
				Stadium: St John's Lane

17 December 1898 9	Sheppey United	3–2	Tottenham Hotspur	Isle of Sheppey, Kent
				Stadium: Botany Road

24 December 1898 10	Warmley	1–5; Game was void after Warmley resigned from the league.	Tottenham Hotspur	Warmley

26 December 1898 11	Southampton	1–1	Tottenham Hotspur	Southampton
	Wood			Stadium: County Ground

31 December 1898 12	Swindon Town	4–3	Tottenham Hotspur	Swindon, Wiltshire
				Stadium: County Ground

7 January 1899 13	Tottenham Hotspur	1–0	Royal Artillery Portsmouth	Tottenham, London
				Stadium: Northumberland Park

14 January 1899 14	Gravesend United	4–2	Tottenham Hotspur	Gravesend, Kent
				Stadium: Overcliffe Ground

21 January 1899 15	Brighton United	0–1	Tottenham Hotspur	Brighton, Sussex

4 February 1899 16	Reading	2–0	Tottenham Hotspur	Reading, Berkshire
				Stadium: Elm Park

18 February 1899 17	Tottenham Hotspur	3–2	Bristol City	Tottenham, London
				Stadium: Northumberland Park

13 March 1899 18	New Brompton	1–1	Tottenham Hotspur	Gillingham, Kent
				Stadium: Priestfield Stadium

18 March 1899 19	Tottenham Hotspur	3–0	New Brompton	Tottenham, London
				Stadium: Northumberland Park

25 March 1899 20	Tottenham Hotspur	1–3	Brighton United	Tottenham, London
				Stadium: Northumberland Park

31 March 1899 21	Tottenham Hotspur	0–1	Southampton	Tottenham, London
			Wood	Stadium: Northumberland Park

1 April 1899 22	Tottenham Hotspur	3–0	Gravesend United	Tottenham, London
				Stadium: Northumberland Park

3 April 1899 23	Tottenham Hotspur	1–1	Swindon Town	Tottenham, London
				Stadium: Northumberland Park

8 April 1899 24	Chatham	1–0	Tottenham Hotspur	Chatham, Kent

15 April 1899 25	Bedminster	1–0	Tottenham Hotspur	Ashton Gate, Bristol
				Stadium: Ashton Gate Stadium

22 April 1899 26	Tottenham Hotspur	3–1	Millwall	Tottenham, London
				Stadium: Northumberland Park

=== United League ===
==== Table ====
Pos	Club	P	W	D	L	F	A	Pts
1	Millwall Athletic	20	14	3	3	42	19	31
2	Southampton	20	12	1	7	52	32	25
3	Woolwich Arsenal	20	10	4	6	30	30	24
4	Tottenham Hotspur	20	11	2	7	36	25	24
5	Bristol City	20	11	0	9	43	31	22
6	Reading	20	8	5	7	36	25	21
7	Brighton United	20	10	1	9	41	42	21
8	Wellingborough	20	7	1	12	32	40	15
9	Kettering Town	20	8	1	11	25	38	15 (Note: Kettering Town were deduced two points.)
10	Rushden	20	6	1	13	26	45	13
11	Luton Town	20	2	3	15	24	71	7

==== Results ====
5 September 1898 1	Tottenham Hotspur	1–0	Luton Town	Tottenham, London
				Stadium: Northumberland Park

19 September 1898 2	Luton Town	3–4	Tottenham Hotspur	Luton, Bedfordshire
				Stadium: Dunstable Road

5 October 1898 3	Brighton United	1–2	Tottenham Hotspur	Brighton, Sussex

10 October 1898 4	Tottenham Hotspur	4–0	Southampton	Tottenham, London
				Stadium: Northumberland Park

15 October 1898 5	Bristol City	0–1	Tottenham Hotspur	Bristol, Gloucestershire
				Stadium: St John's Lane

9 November 1898 6	Reading	0–1	Tottenham Hotspur	Reading, Berkshire
				Stadium: Elm Park

12 November 1898 7	Tottenham Hotspur	2–1	Bristol City	Tottenham, London
				Stadium: Northumberland Park

5 December 1898 8	Tottenham Hotspur	3–0	Kettering Town	Tottenham, London
				Stadium: Northumberland Park

23 January 1899 9	Tottenham Hotspur	1–1	Reading	Tottenham, London
				Stadium: Northumberland Park

15 February 1899 10	Southampton	2–1	Tottenham Hotspur	Southampton, Hampshire
				Stadium: County Ground

20 February 1899 11	Tottenham Hotspur	1–2	Rushden	Tottenham, London
				Stadium: Northumberland Park

27 February 1899 12	Kettering Town	0–1	Tottenham Hotspur	Kettering, Northamptonshire
				Stadium: Rockingham Road

4 March 1899 13	Tottenham Hotspur	1–2	Millwall	Tottenham, London
				Stadium: Northumberland Park

11 March 1899 14	Woolwich Arsenal	2–1	Tottenham Hotspur	Plumstead, London
				Stadium: Manor Ground

27 March 1899 15	Rushden	0–0	Tottenham Hotspur	Rushden, Northamptonshire
				Stadium: Hayden Road

4 April 1899 16	Tottenham Hotspur	3–0	Brighton United	Tottenham, London
				Stadium: Northumberland Park

17 April 1899 17	Wellingborough	3–1	Tottenham Hotspur	Wellingborough, Northamptonshire

24 April 1899 18	Tottenham Hotspur	5–2	Wellingborough	Tottenham, London
				Stadium: Northumberland

26 April 1899 19	Millwall	3–1	Tottenham Hotspur	Isle of Dogs, London
				Stadium: The Athletic Grounds

29 April 1899 20	Tottenham Hotspur	3–2	Woolwich Arsenal	Tottenham, London
				Stadium: Northumberland Park

=== Thames & Medway ===
1898–99 season was the only season that Tottenham played in this league. The table is recorded in Phil Sour's Tottenham Hotspur The Official Illustrated History 1882–1995.

==== Table ====
Pos	Club	P	W	D	L	F	A	Pts
1	New Brompton	16	13	1	2	47	15	27
2	Gravesend United	16	12	1	3	53	21	25
3	Chatham	16	10	3	3	41	11	23
4	Tottenham Hotspur	16	11	0	5	34	28	22
5	Thames Ironworks	16	7	2	7	23	24	16
6	Sheppey United	16	7	1	8	31	31	15
7	RETB	16	2	2	12	24	49	6
8	Grays United	16	2	2	12	11	42	6
9	Dartford	16	2	0	14	21	64	4

==== Results ====
3 September 1898 1	Tottenham Hotspur	3–0	Thames Ironworks	Tottenham, London
				Stadium: Northumberland Park

26 September 1898 2	Sheppey United	2–3	Tottenham Hotspur	Isle of Sheppey, Kent
				Stadium: Botany Road

3 October 1898 3	Tottenham Hotspur	3–1	Gravesend United	Tottenham, London
				Stadium: Northumberland Park

17 October 1898 4	Tottenham Hotspur	2–1	New Brompton	Tottenham, London
				Stadium: Northumberland Park

26 October 1898 5	Dartford	2–3	Tottenham Hotspur	Dartford, Kent

2 November 1898 6	Royal Engineers Training Battalion	2–6	Tottenham Hotspur	Chatham, Kent

2 January 1899 7	Chatham	0–5	Tottenham Hotspur	Chatham, Kent

9 January 1899 8	Tottenham Hotspur	0–4	Chatham	Tottenham, London
				Stadium: Northumberland Park

16 January 1899 9	Tottenham Hotspur	3–0	Sheppey United	Tottenham, London
				Stadium: Northumberland Park

6 February 1899 10	Tottenham Hotspur	2–1	Grays United	Tottenham, London
				Stadium: Northumberland Park

8 March 1899 11	Gravesend United	0–3	Tottenham Hotspur	Gravesend, Kent
				Stadium: Overcliffe Ground

16 March 1899 12	Thames Ironworks	2–1	Tottenham Hotspur	London
				Stadium: Memorial Grounds

20 March 1899 13	Tottenham Hotspur	1–2	Royal Engineers Training Battalion	Tottenham, London
				Stadium: Northumberland Park

22 March 1899 14	Grays United	1–0	Tottenham Hotspur	Grays, Essex
				Stadium: New Recreation Ground

10 April 1899 15	New Brompton	5–4	Tottenham Hotspur	Gillingham, Kent
				Stadium: Priestfield Stadium

13 April 1899 16	Tottenham Hotspur	9–0	Dartford	Tottenham, London
				Stadium: Northumberland Park

=== FA Cup ===
==== Results ====
29 October 1898 3rd Qualifying	Tottenham Hotspur	4–0	Wolverton	Tottenham, London
	Bradshaw; McKay; Cameron; Joyce			Stadium: Northumberland Park; Attendance: 3,000

19 November 1898 4th Qualifying	Clapton	1–1	Tottenham Hotspur	Forest Gate, London
			Bradshaw	Stadium: The Old Spotted Dog Ground; Attendance: 7,000

23 November 1898 4th Qualifying reply	Tottenham Hotspur	2–1	Clapton	Tottenham, London
	John Cameron			Stadium: Northumberland Park

10 December 1898 5th Qualifying	Tottenham Hotspur	1–1	Luton Town	Tottenham, London
	Joyce			Stadium: Northumberland Park; Attendance: 12,000

10 December 1898 5th Qualifying reply	Luton Town	1–1	Tottenham Hotspur	Luton, Bedfordshire
			Joyce	Stadium: Dunstable Road; Attendance: 4,000

10 December 1898 5th Qualifying 2nd reply	Tottenham Hotspur	2–0	Luton Town	Tufnell Park
	Bradshaw; Cameron			Attendance: 8,000

28 January 1899 First round	Tottenham Hotspur	1–1	Newton Heath	Tottenham, London
	Joyce		Cassidy	Stadium: Northumberland Park; Attendance: 13,721

1 February 1899 First round replay	Newton Heath	3–5	Tottenham Hotspur	Clayton, Manchester
	Bryant		McKay; Joyce; McNaught; Smith	Stadium: Bank Street (football ground); Attendance: 6,000

11 February 1899 Second round	Tottenham Hotspur	2–1	Sunderland	Tottenham, London
	Bradshaw; Cameron			Stadium: Northumberland Park; Attendance: 12,371

25 February 1899 Third round	Stoke	4–1	Tottenham Hotspur	Stoke-on-Trent
	Kennedy; Molyneux; Schofield; Johnson		Bradshaw	Stadium: Victoria Ground; Attendance: 25,000

== Bibliography ==
- Soar, Phil (1995). Tottenham Hotspur The Official Illustrated History 1882–1995. Hamlyn. ISBN 0-600-58706-1.
- Goodwin, Bob (1992). The Spurs Alphabet. ACL & Polar Publishing (UK) Ltd. ISBN 0-9514862-8-4.
