= 1896–97 Thames Ironworks F.C. season =

English football team season

Thames Ironworks
1896–97 season
- Owner: Arnold Hills
- Club secretary: Francis Payne
- Stadium: Hermit Road (1896); Browning Road (1897)
- London League: 2nd
- FA Cup: First qualifying round
- Top goalscorer: League: H. Butterworth (4); All: George Gresham (6)
Home colours

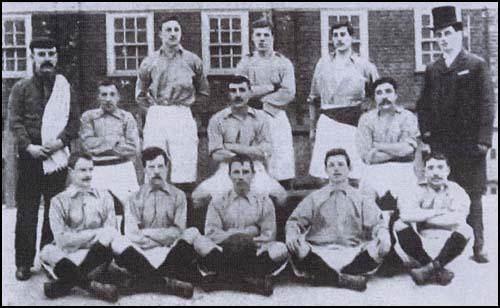
1897 team.

The 1896–97 season was Thames Ironworks' second season after the club's formation in 1895.

Thames Ironworks F.C. 1896–1897

"With reference to the forthcoming season, it has been decided to enter for the English Cup, London Senior Cup, West Ham Charity Cup, South Essex League senior and junior and if possible, one or two others. There will be very few dates left open for "friendly" matches, so it ought to be a good thing for the club financially." – Thames Iron Works Gazette

However, the most significant competition that Thames Ironworks would enter that season would be the London League, even though the West Ham area was still officially part of Essex at the time.

It was a seamless transition for the club to make as Thames Ironworks and Shipbuilding Co. Ltd owner Arnold Hills was also president of the London League, and along with Thames Ironworks F.C. committee chairman Francis Payne, helped to draft the competition's rules.

New signings for the season included Reading players Edward Hatton, Peter Davie and Frank Dandridge. H. Rossiter and Holmes, would also join from the Berkshire club, as well as many more Thames Iron Works employees that still provided the core of the team.

In their first ever competitive league fixture in the London League, staged at the Hermit Road ground, on 19 September 1896 Thames Ironworks beat the Vampires 3–0.

The following month, "The Irons" went out in the FA Cup first qualifying round for the second year running, losing 0–8 away to Kent Southern League team Sheppey United on 10 October 1897.

Shortly after their exit from the FA Cup they were handed an eviction notice from the Hermit Road ground. The club had violated their tenancy agreement by charging admission fees and building a perimeter fence and pavilion. Thames Ironworks had to play their next four fixtures at the grounds of their opponents, until a new home could be found. The first of these games was against eventual champions 3rd Grenadier Guards F.C. on 22 October 1896, which The Irons lost 1–4. The gloom continued on 5 December 1896, when Thames Ironworks lost in the first round of the Essex Senior Cup 2–3, in a narrowly fought game away to Leyton F.C.

At the turn of 1897 Arnold Hills had managed to lease a temporary piece of land for the team, located in Browning Road, East Ham. However, the new situation was not ideal, as explained by future Ironworks player and West Ham United F.C. manager Syd King in his 1906 book:

'"For some reason, not altogether explained, the local public at this place did not take kindly to them and the records show that Browning Road was a wilderness both in the manner of luck and support." – Syd King, 'Book Of Football' (1906)

Arnold Hills had already earmarked a large piece of land in Canning Town and would eventually spend £20,000 on the construction of an athletic ground with facilities for cycling and tennis as well as football but the ground would not be ready until the following season.

Travelling across the river to Kent again provided cup disappointment for "The Irons" on 13 February 1897, when they lost their second replay in the 5th round of London Senior Cup against Bromley 0–2. They managed to fare better locally, making the final of the West Ham Charity Cup for the second year running. On 20 March 1897 they narrowly lost the final 0–1 to West Ham Garfield. It was also around that time that Thames Ironworks' inspirational captain Robert Stevenson left to return to his native Scotland to play for Arthurlie.

Thames Ironworks' biggest defeat of the season came soon after, on 1 April 1897, when they lost for the second time to the champions-elect 3rd Grenadier Guards F.C. 0–5 at Browning Road. Yet it was only two days later, when in another home game, that "The Irons" recorded their biggest win of the season when they beat Crouch End 4–1. Another 5 days later would see the last game of the season, this time at home to Barking Woodville. The game ended 1–1.

In total Thames Ironworks won 11 of their 22 league and cup games in the 1896–1897 season, drawing on 4 occasions and losing 7.

They scored 39 goals and conceded 38.

Their first appearance in the London League had seen them finish 4th, but only temporarily. The 1st Scots Guards had withdrawn from the league during the season, and their record was deleted, and the London Welsh team had been suspended towards the end of the season. "The Irons" had not yet played London Welsh and as a result, and probably thanks also to Arnold Hills' presidency of the league and Francis Payne's drafting of the rules, Thames Ironworks F.C. were awarded two wins by default and finished the revised league as runners up. H. Butterworth ended the season as the club's top scorer in the league, with four goals from his six appearances.

== Squad ==
No.		Player	Position	FA Apps	FA Gls	Date signed	Previous club
Thames Ironworks F.C. 1896–97 FA Cup Team vs Sheppey
1	(England)	Southwood	GK	1		1896	Thames Ironworks Employee
2	(Scotland)	Robert Stevenson (captain)	RB	1		1895	Old Castle Swifts F.C.
3	(England)	Albert Holstock	LB	1		1896	Thames Ironworks Employee
4	(England)	Richard Bird	RH	1		1896	Thames Ironworks Employee
5	(England)	Frank Dandridge	CH	1		1896	Reading
6	(England)	Peter Davie	LH	1		1896	Reading
7	(England)	Albert Nicholls	RW	1		1896	Thames Ironworks Employee
8	(England)	H. Rossiter	IR	1		1896	Reading
9	(England)	Edward Hatton	CF	1		1896	Reading
10	(England)	George Gresham	IL	1		1896	Gainsborough Trinity
11	(England)	Johnny Morrison	LW	1		1896	Thames Ironworks Employee
Other known players
	(England)	Charlie Dove	RH			1895	Thames Ironworks Employee & South West Ham
	(England)	David Furnell	GK			1895	Old Castle Swifts F.C.
	(England)	T. Barnes	GK	1			
	(Scotland)	Sam Hay	F			1895	Victoria
	(England)	Holmes				1896	Reading

== See also ==
- West Ham United F.C.

== Bibliography ==
- Belton, Brian (2006). West Ham United Miscellany. Pennant Books. ISBN 0-9550394-4-4.
- Blows, Kirk; Hogg, Tony (2000). The Essential History of West Ham United. Headline. ISBN 0-7472-7036-8.
- Northcutt, John; Marsh, Steve (2015). West Ham United: The Complete Record. deCoubertin Books. ISBN 978-1-909245-27-3.
- Powles, John (2005). Iron in the Blood. Nottingham: Soccerdata. ISBN 1-899468-22-6. Archived from the original on 12 January 2018.
