= 1897–98 Thames Ironworks F.C. season =

English football team season

Thames Ironworks F.C. 1897–1898

The 1897–98 season was Thames Ironworks' third season after the club's formation in 1895.

Thames Ironworks' new venue, the Memorial Grounds, was opened on Jubilee Day, 1897, to coincide with the sixtieth anniversary of Queen Victoria on the throne. Thames' new home had cost £20,000 of Arnold Hills' money to build. It was situated close to where West Ham station now stands. Aside from a football pitch, the stadium contained a cycle track, a cinder running track and one of the largest outdoor swimming pools in England. It was said at the time that the grounds were "good enough to stage an English Cup Final." To coincide with this raised standard, for the first time ever the club committee had introduced players' insurance. This meant the players would be covered against loss of wages caused by injuries sustained from playing football.

On 11 September 1897, in their first game of the new season of the London League and also at their new ground, Thames beat Brentford 1–0. This was closely followed by the first two qualifying rounds of the FA Cup. On 18 September Thames overcame Redhill thanks to an own goal and a brace from Scottish defender Simon Chisholm. This was followed by a game against the Royal Engineers Training Battalion which Thames won 2–1 with goals from another of The Irons' Scotsmen Jimmy Reid and former Reading centre forward Edward Hatton.

Their cup form was matched by great league form as "The Irons" went on to win their first six London League games, the second of which was a 4–0 victory over Leyton F.C. A contemporary reporter wrote this at the time:

""LEYTON TOOK A WEAK TEAM TO CANNING TOWN AND LOST BY FOUR GOALS TO NIL — Nearly 2,000 spectators saw the match, which was commenced by the Ironworks in real earnest. Twenty-five minutes after the start the Ironworks, who so far had the best of matters, obtained their first point in the following manner: Hatton secured about fifty yards from goal and after dodging and wriggling through the whole of the Leyton defence, tested Sterling with a stinger that was only partially cleared and Hatton, pouncing on the ball again, promptly rushed it through.
Three minutes later, Gresham scored a second, so enabling the Thames to cross over with a deserved lead of two goals. For the best part of the game it was Thames' forwards v Leyton's defence and although beaten twice before the finish by Reid and Edwards, they were in no way disgraced.
Hatton was the most conspicuous of the Ironworks forwards, while Dove, Neil, Dandridge and Chisholm all played well in defence with goalkeeper Furnell having a very easy task." — TAM, Morning Leader, 6 October 1897.

There was a two-week break from fixture commitments before Thames Ironworks briefly resumed their FA Cup involvement in the third qualifying round. On 16 October 1897, they faced St Albans and lost the game 0–2. Disappointment soon faded, and it was perhaps in the third London League game away to champions 3rd Grenadier Guards, that "The Irons" found real belief in their ability to challenge for the London League. The managed to win 1–0 against a team who had beaten them 4–1 and 5–0 during the previous season.

On 27 November they faced Novacastrians F.C. in the first round of the London Senior Cup, which they won 1–0. The second round tie against 2nd Grenadier Guards was postponed after the Guards withdrew, and The Irons were granted a walkover. 1897 ended with "The Irons" top of the table and unbeaten in the London League, having only conceded five goals, three of them coming in a 3–3 thriller against local rivals Ilford.

It was another game against Ilford F.C. that kicked off the new year on 1 January 1898. This time, in front of their home crowd, "The Irons" won 4–0. January continued in a similar vein with a 4–2 win against Stanley F.C. being quickly followed by their highest scoring game of the season on 15 January, when a 'ten goal thriller' against Bromley F.C. went The Ironworks' way 7–3. On 22 January there was yet another game against rivals Ilford F.C., this time in the third round of the London Senior Cup. Revenge for their New Years Day's defeat was had, and Ilford triumphed over "The Irons" 3–1.

After two draws in late February and early March, their impressive league run continued with a 5–1 against Bromley on 19 March, and a 3–1 home win against 3rd Grenadier Guards F.C. on 2 April.

The penultimate fixture of the London League season was against second placed Brentford who were only one point behind "The Irons". The game caused much local interest, including a newspaper feature in the East Ham Echo prior to the game, containing an article on Thames Ironworks' rising star Charlie Dove. At Shooters Field on 23 April 1898, Thames lost the tie 0–1, and Brentford leap-frogged "The Irons" and were now one point ahead with one game left to play.

A final day victory away to 2nd Grenadier Guards on 30 April ensured that Thames Ironworks won the London League title by a single point, as fellow challengers Brentford F.C. had lost to Barking Woodville. Thames had finished the season with a 100% home record. In total they had won twelve and drawn three of their sixteen London League games, only losing in the game away to Brentford. On the way to the title they had scored 47 goals and conceded 15, the best offensive and defensive record in the division.

Thames Ironworks F.C. were also successful in their application to the Southern League and would begin the following season in Southern League Division Two.

== Squad ==
No.		Player	Position	FA Apps	FA Gls	Date signed	Previous club
Thames Ironworks F.C. 1897–98 First XI (Most appearances)
1	(England)	David Furnell	GK	3		1895	Old Castle Swifts F.C.
2	(England)	Fred Chalkley	RB	3		1897	Park Grove F.C.
3	(England)	Walter Tranter (captain)	LB	2		1897	Thames Ironworks Employee
4	(England)	Charlie Dove	RH	3		1895	Thames Ironworks Employee & South West Ham
5	(England)	Frank Dandridge	CH	3		1896	Reading
6	(Scotland)	Simon Chisholm	LH	2	2	1897	Inverness
7	(England)	Older	RW	2		1897	Thames Ironworks Employee
8	(England)	Edward Hatton	RF	3	1	1896	Reading
9	(Scotland)	Jimmy Reid	CF	3	1	1897	Reading
10	(England)	George Gresham	LF	3		1896	Gainsborough Trinity
11	(England)	A. Edwards	LW	3		1897	Thames Ironworks Employee
Other players with appearances
7	(England)	Henry Hird	RW	1		1897	Stockton F.C.
6	(England)	Gillies	LH	1		1897	Thames Ironworks Employee
3	(England)	William Taylor	LB	1		1897	Thames Ironworks Employee
Other known players
	(England)	George Neil	D			1897	West Norwood F.C.
	(Scotland)	Sam Hay	F			1895	Victoria
	(England)	Robert Heath	GK			1897	West Ham Garfield

== See also ==
- West Ham United F.C.

== Bibliography ==
- Belton, Brian (2006). West Ham United Miscellany. Pennant Books. ISBN 0-9550394-4-4.
- Blows, Kirk; Hogg, Tony (2000). The Essential History of West Ham United. Headline. ISBN 0-7472-7036-8.
- Powles, John (2005). Iron in the Blood. Nottingham: Soccerdata. ISBN 1-899468-22-6. Archived from the original on 12 January 2018.
