= George Neil =

English footballer

Personal information
- Full name: George Mitchell Neil
- Date of birth: 11 November 1874
- Place of birth: Poplar, England
- Date of death: 22 December 1904 (aged 30)
- Place of death: Southend-on-Sea, England
- Height: 5 ft 11 in (1.80 m)
- Position: Defender

Senior career*
Years	Team	Apps	(Gls)
1891–1894	Millwall Athletic		
1894–1896	West Norwood		
1896–1899	Thames Ironworks	2	(0)
1900	West Ham United	1	(0)
- * Club domestic league appearances and goals

George Mitchell Neil (Note: Recorded as George Neill in some sources) (11 November 1874 – 22 December 1904) was an English association footballer who played as a defender.

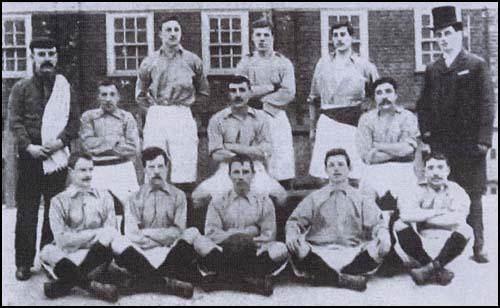
Neil (back row, left) with Thames Ironworks in 1897

Born in Poplar, London, Neil spent three seasons with Millwall Athletic playing mostly in their reserve team before signing for West Norwood in 1894. For two of his seasons, Neil was club captain. He was described as a "very accomplished full-back, who could play on either flank". Whilst still with West Norwood he played as a guest player for Thames Ironworks. The first occasion was one of the first ever games played under "electric light", at Hermit Road against West Bromwich Albion in March 1896. In October 1896 he played in the London League for West Norwood losing to Thames Ironworks. A press report of the time noted his performance as being of "worthy of special mention". The following week, on 24 October 1896, he made his Ironworks debut, in a London League game against Crouch End. Fixtures were infrequent for the side and by 1899 he had played only 18 games and scored one goal.

In 1899 he took over as club secretary from Francis Payne and arranged the important signings of Tom Bradshaw, Bill Joyce and Kenny McKay, all from Tottenham Hotspur. Concerned about costs, club owner Arnold Hills initially refused to approve the transfers. Hills had decided to raise capital for the parent company, Thames Ironworks and Shipbuilding Company, and to make the company a limited company. Part of this involved reorganizing the company football club. With the need now for Hills to satisfy shareholders, partly to save costs, Thames Ironworks folded to later become West Ham United. Neil was replaced as club secretary by Lew Bowen and would play only one more game for West Ham, on 13 October 1900 in a 2–0 home win against Watford, before his involvement with the club ended.

Neil died of consumption, at the age of 30, in December 1904.
