= Browning Road =

Sports venue in East Ham, London, England

- Interactive map of Browning Road
- Location: East Ham; London, England
- Coordinates: 51.5435°N 0.0552°E

Tenant
- Thames Ironworks (1896–1897)

Website
- https://www.whufc.com/club/history/former-homes/browning-road

Browning Road was the home ground of London football club Thames Ironworks, the team that would become West Ham United, towards the end of the 1896–97 season.

Thames Ironworks had been handed an eviction notice from their previous Hermit Road ground in October 1896 for violating their tenancy agreement and had to play their next four fixtures at the grounds of their opponents, until Thames' chairman Arnold Hills managed to lease a temporary piece of land for the team, located at Browning Road, East Ham.

Thames' first game at their new home came on 6 March 1897 in a 3–2 win over Ilford. However, the new situation was not ideal, as explained by future Ironworks player and West Ham United manager Syd King in his 1906 book:

For some reason, not altogether explained, the local public at this place did not take kindly to them and the records show that Browning Road was a wilderness both in the manner of luck and support."

— Syd King, Book of Football (1906)

With the club's presence never likely to be permanent, chairman Arnold Hills earmarked a large piece of land in Canning Town and would eventually spend £20,000 on the construction of the Memorial Grounds. On 8 April 1897 came not only Thames Ironworks' last game of the season but their last game at Browning Road. The game against Barking Woodville ended 1–1.
