= Thames Ironworks =

Thames Ironworks may refer to:

- Thames Ironworks and Shipbuilding Company, a shipyard and ironworks in east London
- Thames Ironworks F.C., the forerunner to West Ham United Football Club
