= H. Rossiter =

English footballer

Personal information
- Position: Inside forward

Senior career*
Years	Team	Apps	(Gls)
- Reading
1896–1898	Thames Ironworks		
- * Club domestic league appearances and goals

H. Rossiter was a footballer who played inside right for Reading before moving in 1896 to Thames Ironworks, the team that went on to become West Ham United. He played for the club during their initial season of 1895–96, with his first recorded appearance a friendly against Liverpool Casuals on 4 April 1896, in which he scored. He was a regular for "The Irons" in the 1896–97 season, playing in their FA Cup game of that year against Sheppey United, and well as London League fixtures. In 1897–98, he featured only for the reserves.
