= Pat Leonard =

Pat Leonard may refer to:

- Patrick Leonard, American songwriter
- Patricia Leonard, British singer with the D'Oyly Carte Opera Company
- Patrick Leonard (footballer), Scottish professional footballer
