= Frederick Chalkley =

English footballer

Personal information
- Full name: Frederick George Chalkley
- Date of birth: 12 July 1874
- Place of birth: Plaistow, England
- Date of death: 5 March 1953 (aged 78)
- Place of death: Romford, Essex, England
- Position: Full-back

Senior career*
Years	Team	Apps	(Gls)
–1896	Park Grove		
1896–1896	Thames Ironworks	9	(0)
1898–?	Monsteds Athletic		
- Clapton Orient
- * Club domestic league appearances and goals

Frederick George Chalkley (12 July 1874 – 5 March 1953) was an English footballer who played as a full-back for Thames Ironworks, the club that would later become known as West Ham United.

Born in Plaistow, Essex, Chalkley played for local team Park Grove, becoming club captain in 1893–94, before joining Thames Ironworks in August 1896. He played in the first game of the season, against Queens Park Rangers, but did not earn a permanent place until November 1896 from when he did not miss a game for the rest of the season. He lost his place in November 1897 and was relegated to playing for the second team. He made three FA Cup appearances for the club during the 1897–98 season.

In 1898, Chalkley left the Irons for London League side Monsteds Athletic. He also played for Clapton Orient, who later became known as Leyton Orient.
