= Dave Taylor (Thames Ironworks F.C. founder) =

Dave Taylor was one of the co-founders of Thames Ironworks, the team that became West Ham United, in 1895.

He was a foreman at the Thames Iron Works as well as being a local football referee. Taylor approached the Ironworks owner Arnold Hills with the idea of starting a works football team, and with his financial aid was able to announce on 29 June 1895 the following in the company's weekly journal:

"Mr. Taylor, who is working in the shipbuilding department, has undertaken to get up a football club for next winter and I learn that quoits and bowls will also be added to the attractions." - Thames Iron Works Gazette.

He organised the half-a-crown year's membership for fifty would-be players and spent that summer arranging the fixtures for the Thames Ironworks team and their reserves for the club's inaugural season of 1895–96.

Before Thames Ironworks played their first game Dave Taylor returned to refereeing and the organisational duties of the club were handed over to another Thames Iron Works employee, Ted Harsent, who became the first official club secretary.

== Bibliography ==
- Blows, Kirk; Hogg, Tony (2000). The Essential History of West Ham United. Headline. ISBN 0-7472-7036-8.
- Powles, John (2005). Iron in the Blood. Nottingham: SoccerData. ISBN 1-899468-22-6.

Preceded by No one	Thames Ironworks F.C. Co-founder; 1895	Succeeded by Ted Harsent (Club Secretary); 1895-1897
