= Lew Bowen =

English football executive

- Bowen while at West Ham United (taken from the 1901–02 Handbook)
- Born: Swansea
- Occupations: Club secretary, West Ham United (later financial director)
- Years active: 1900 – after 1903

Lew M. Bowen was the first club secretary of English football club West Ham United.

Born in Swansea, Bowen was a clerk at the Thames Ironworks and Shipbuilding Company and had reported on predecessor club Thames Ironworks F.C. for the Thames Ironworks Gazette. He was installed immediately following the new club's formation in June 1900.

Bowen remained at the club as financial director after Syd King was appointed secretary during the 1901–02 season. He would also perform the role of league delegate. In 1903, Bowen was involved in an application to the Football Association for West Ham's home, the Memorial Grounds, to host an FA Cup final or semi-final. "I think that we have fairly proved the possibilities of putting a crowd of over 100,000 in the Grounds. I believe the correct figures are 133,000 allowing for 16 inches for each person", he stated in a letter to the FA.
