= Sam Hay (footballer) =

Scottish footballer

Personal information
- Place of birth: Renfrewshire, Scotland
- Position: Inside right

Senior career*
| Years | Team | Apps | (Gls) |
| –1895 | Blantyre Victoria | | |
| 1895–1899 | Thames Ironworks | | |
- * Club domestic league appearances and goals

Sam Hay was a footballer who played inside-right for Thames Ironworks, the club that would later become West Ham United. He was born in Renfrewshire, Scotland, and played for Victoria, until being signed up by the Irons for the 1895–96 season, where he became a regular choice.

== See also ==
- Thames Ironworks F.C. season 1895–96
- Thames Ironworks F.C. season 1896–97
- Thames Ironworks F.C. season 1897–98
- Thames Ironworks F.C. season 1898–99
