= Edward Hatton (footballer) =

English footballer

Edward Hutton
Personal information
- Full name: Edward Hatton
- Position: Centre forward

Senior career*
Years	Team	Apps	(Gls)
189?–1896	Reading		
1896–1898	Thames Ironworks	6	(4)
- * Club domestic league appearances and goals

Edward Hatton, also known as E. G. Hatton, was a footballer who played centre forward for Reading F.C. and Thames Ironworks, the team that eventually became West Ham United. He joined Thames Ironworks in 1896, scoring a brace on his debut in a 3–1 win in a London League fixture against Vampires F.C.

During his two seasons at the club he played in six London League games, scoring four goals and in four FA Cup games, scoring one goal. He also made an appearance in the London Senior Cup, making a total of eleven senior appearances for the club and is known to have made appearances in at least two friendlies.

== See also ==
- 1896–97 Thames Ironworks F.C. season
- 1897–98 Thames Ironworks F.C. season

== Notes ==
1. In erroneous sources this players' name is also given as E. G. Hutton.
