= Harry Bradshaw (footballer, born 1873) =

English footballer (1873–1899)

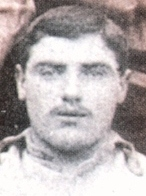

Personal information
- Full name: Thomas Henry Bradshaw
- Date of birth: 24 August 1873
- Place of birth: Liverpool, England
- Date of death: 25 December 1899 (aged 26)
- Place of death: Tottenham, England
- Position: Forward

Youth career
- 1889–1891: Liverpool Nomads

Senior career*
Years	Team	Apps	(Gls)
1891–1893	Northwich Victoria		
1893–1898	Liverpool	118	(45)
1898	Northwich Victoria		
1898–1899	Tottenham Hotspur		
1899	Thames Ironworks	5	(0)

International career
1897	England	1	(0)
- * Club domestic league appearances and goals

Thomas Henry Bradshaw (24 August 1873 – 25 December 1899) was an English international footballer who played in the outside-left and centre-forward positions for Liverpool, Northwich Victoria, Tottenham Hotspur and Thames Ironworks during the late 19th century.

== Life and playing career ==
Bradshaw was born in Liverpool and was signed for Liverpool from Northwich Victoria in October 1893 by manager John McKenna. Originally playing as a centre-forward, Bradshaw made his debut against Woolwich Arsenal, in a Second Division game, scoring the last goal in a 5–0 victory. He went on to score seven in the remaining fourteen matches of the 1893–94 season, helping Liverpool to the Second Division title and promotion to the top tier of English football, after a Test Match victory over Newton Heath.

During the following season Bradshaw was the only ever-present and scored seventeen times, in a Liverpool team that struggled and were eventually relegated back down to Division 2. Liverpool again topped the Second Division at the end of the 1895–96 season with Bradshaw scoring twelve goals from his new position on the left-wing, his versatility giving Liverpool an extra dimension to their attack.

Bradshaw gained one England cap when he played against Ireland on 20 February 1897 and holds the distinction of being Liverpool's first ever player to achieve international recognition.

Bradshaw left Liverpool in May 1898, returning briefly to Northwich Victoria before joining Tottenham Hotspur. His brief stay at Northumberland Road was marked with a little piece of history when his goal in an FA Cup tie in 1899 helped Spurs become the first lower division club ever to come from behind to beat top-flight opposition in the shape of Sunderland. Bradshaw then made the journey from North to east London that summer, joining Thames Ironworks, the team that would later become West Ham United. He was immediately appointed as the club's captain.

During a Southern League match on 7 October 1899, Bradshaw sustained an injury from a kick to the head in The Irons 1–0 win over Bedminster that would begin a series of events that would see the condition of his health deteriorate. He still managed to make a strong contribution, scoring a goal in The Irons biggest win of the season, 7–0 away to Dartford. Bradshaw played his last Southern League game ever, in a 0–0 home draw against New Brompton on 11 November. Only a week later, The Irons had to play New Brompton again, this time in the FA Cup, and a 0–0 draw was followed by 2–0 replay win, setting up a next round tie against Thames Ironworks' arch-rivals Millwall. The clearly ailing Bradshaw was rested for the next two games, in preparation for the tie against Millwall, which was to follow sixteen days later. In the game on 9 December, Bradshaw made his comeback, scoring the only goal in a 2–1 defeat. This would be his last ever game.

Bradshaw finally succumbed to his lengthy illness on Christmas Day 1899. His cause of death was recorded as consumption. Bradshaw's death was remembered by Thames Ironworks player and future West Ham manager Syd King, in his brief history of the club:

"The record of 1899–1900, however, would not be complete without some reference to poor Tom Bradshaw, who came from Spurs with Joyce. How well I remember that match with Queens Park Rangers during the Christmas holidays, when Joyce brought over the sad message to the Memorial Grounds that our comrade had passed away. Poor Tom was one of the cleverest wing forwards I have ever known and he was immensely popular with everybody." – Syd King, 'Book of Football' (1906)

Bradshaw's close friends Bill Joyce and Kenny McKay left for Portsmouth and Fulham respectively.

== Honours ==
Liverpool

- Football League Division Two winner: 1893–94, 1895–96

== Bibliography ==
- Belton, Brian (2006). West Ham United Miscellany. Pennant Books. ISBN 0-9550394-4-4.
- Blows, Kirk; Hogg, Tony (2000). The Essential History of West Ham United. Headline. ISBN 0-7472-7036-8.
- Powles, John (2005). Iron in the Blood. Nottingham: SoccerData. ISBN 1-899468-22-6.
