= Hermit Road =

Stadium in Canning Town, London, England

- Interactive map of Hermit Road
- Location: Canning Town; London, England
- Coordinates: 51°31′23.78″N 0°0′43.06″E

Tenants
- Old St Luke's (1892–1894); Old Castle Swifts (1894–1895); Thames Ironworks (1895–1896)

Website
- https://www.whufc.com/club/history/former-homes/hermit-road

Hermit Road was a stadium located in Canning Town in London, England. It was the first home ground of football club Thames Ironworks, the works team of the Thames Ironworks and Shipbuilding Company. The club would later be reformed as West Ham United.

The ground was used by Old St Luke's from 1892 and continued to be used after the club merged with Castle Swifts to become Old Castle Swifts, the first professional football club in Essex, for the 1894–95 season. Thames Ironworks took over the tenancy of the ground from Old Castle Swifts in the summer of 1895 after the club was wound up.

Future manager Syd King later described Hermit Road as a "cinder heap" and "barren waste". The ground employed a system of drainage sluices, which gave the look of it being surrounded by a moat. Canvas sheeting was originally used for fencing, to prevent non-paying spectators from seeing the games. This was later replaced.

Thames Ironworks played their first ever fixture of the 1895–96 season against Royal Ordnance reserves on 7 September 1895, the game ending 1–1. In Thames' first competitive game, they took on Chatham in a preliminary qualifying round of the FA Cup. The match had to be played at Chatham's ground in Kent as they had rated the Irons' Hermit Road Ground as unsuitable. Thames lost the game 5–0.

The ground was host to some of the first experiments with artificial lighting. Following a number of trials against local sides, 16 March 1896 saw a 'floodlit friendly' in Thames' first encounter with Woolwich Arsenal, in an epic encounter that they lost 3–5. These early attempts at floodlighting were set up using Thames Iron Works engineers and equipment, and caused an amount of notoriety. They were also used for the Irons' next game, in their first ever meeting with West Bromwich Albion, which they lost 2–4.

The 1896–97 season saw Thames Ironworks beat the Vampires 3–0 in their first ever London League fixture on 19 September 1896. Thames Ironworks' next game at Hermit Road would also be their last. It came on 8 October, when they beat 1st Scots Guards 1–0. (Note: Records for 1st Scots Guards were subsequently expunged after they withdrew from the league.) Later that month they were handed an eviction notice from Hermit Road by their landlords. The club had violated their tenancy agreement by charging admission fees and building a perimeter fence and pavilion. Thames Ironworks had to play their next four fixtures at the grounds of their opponents, until a new home could be found. At the turn of 1897, Thames' chairman Arnold Hills had managed to lease a temporary piece of land for the team, located in Browning Road, East Ham.

After the club were evicted from Hermit Road, West Ham Council acquired the land for a park with the assistance of funding, including from the Metropolitan Public Gardens Association, and was opened in 1899. The MPGA also provided 24 seats. The original features of the park have since disappeared; the park is called Hermit Road Recreation Ground.

== Bibliography ==
- Blows, Kirk; Hogg, Tony (2000). The Essential History of West Ham United. Headline. ISBN 0-7472-7036-8.
