= Arthur Marjeram =

English footballer

Personal information
- Full name: Arthur Eugene Marjeram
- Date of birth: 1877
- Place of birth: Brighton, England
- Date of death: August 1911 (aged 33–34)
- Position: Left-back

Senior career*
Years	Team	Apps	(Gls)
- Aston Villa
- Swanscombe
1898	Thames Ironworks	8	(0)
- * Club domestic league appearances and goals as of 08:18, 29 February 2012 (UTC)

Arthur Marjeram^{a} (1877 – August 1911) was an English footballer who played as a left-back for Aston Villa and Thames Ironworks.

== Club career ==
Marjeram started as an amateur player with Aston Villa before moving south to play for Swanscombe and then Thames Ironworks. He played in the first Thames Ironworks professional side on 1 September 1898 against Sheppey United which they lost 1–0 and in their inaugural Southern League fixture against Shepherd's Bush on 10 September 1898 which they won 3–0. He was a member of the side which won the 1898–99 Southern League Division Two

== Honours ==
Club - Thames Ironworks

1898–99 Southern League Division Two

== Notes ==
- ^ Note a: Several sources note the surname as "Marjoram". However the 1881, 1891 and 1901 censuses, the book West Ham Who's Who and John Powles book on Thames Ironworks, Iron in the Blood show "Marjeram".
