= Francis Payne =

English football administrator

Francis Payne was one of the men responsible for drafting the rules for the London League and became London League members Thames Ironworks F.C.'s club secretary in 1897, succeeding Ted Harsent in the post. The rules of the London League allowed "The Irons" to finish second rather than fourth owing to a "technicality".

He was also involved in other Iron Works sports, including athletics and tennis. Francis Payne was replaced by the man he succeeded as the football club secretary, Ted Harsent, after Thames Ironworks had gained entry to the Southern League in the summer of 1898.

== See also ==
- Thames Ironworks F.C. 1896-1897

Preceded by Ted Harsent; 1895-1897	Thames Ironworks F.C. Club Secretary; 1897-1898	Succeeded by Ted Harsent; 1898-1899
