= Tommy Dunn =

Scottish footballer (1873–1938)

Personal information
- Full name: Thomas Dunn
- Date of birth: 2 June 1873
- Place of birth: Falkirk, Scotland
- Date of death: 24 June 1938 (aged 65)
- Position: Full back

Senior career*
Years	Team	Apps	(Gls)
1891–1896	Wolverhampton Wanderers	88	(0)
1896–1897	Burnley	7	(0)
1897–1898	Chatham Town	?	(?)
1898–1900	Thames Ironworks	32	(0)
- * Club domestic league appearances and goals

Thomas Dunn (2 June 1873 – 24 June 1938) was a Scottish professional association footballer who played as a full-back.

Dunn played in the English Football League for Wolverhampton Wanderers and Burnley. After a spell at Southern League club Chatham Town, he joined Thames Ironworks, the club that would later be reformed as West Ham United. There, he helped the side to the Southern League Second Division title in 1898–99. He made 42 competitive appearances over his two seasons at the Irons.
