= Patrick Leonard (footballer) =

Scottish footballer

Personal information
- Date of birth: 1877
- Place of birth: Scotland
- Position: Forward

Senior career*
Years	Team	Apps	(Gls)
1896–1897	St Mirren	10	(2)
1897–1898	Manchester City	15	(4)
1898–1899	New Brompton	1	(0)
1899	Thames Ironworks	10	(7)
1899	Canning Town		
1899	Manchester City	1	(1)
Total		37	(14)
- * Club domestic league appearances and goals

Patrick Leonard (1877 – after 1899) was a Scottish professional footballer who played as a forward, primarily at outside left.

== Career ==
Leonard began his football career with St Mirren in his native Scotland before moving to England, where he joined Manchester City. He made 16 appearances during the 1897–98 season in the league and FA Cup, and then headed south again. He played for Southern League clubs New Brompton and then Thames Ironworks, for whom he scored eight goals from 10 games. In his first game, a friendly against Upton Park, Leonard scored a hat-trick. His first league goals for The Ironworks came on 21 January 1899 in an away game at Wolverton LNWR in what was their 13th game of a 22-game season. With Wolverton fellow contenders for promotion, 200 spectators saw Leonard score twice in a 4–3 victory.

His final goal and game was on 22 April 1899 in a 1898–99 Southern League Second Division decider against Cowes, to determine the overall winners. The game was played at a neutral venue, on a pitch behind The Lord Nelson pub on East Ferry Road, home of Millwall Athletic. This was despite the ground being only three miles from Memorial Grounds, home of Thames Ironworks and considerably further from Cowes' home ground on the Isle of Wight, a decision which had infuriated Cowes management. Leonard scored the third goal in a 3–1 victory after earlier goals for Thames Ironworks by David Lloyd and Henderson.

After a five-month spell with Canning Town, Leonard returned to Manchester City, for whom he made one last appearance, scoring the opening goal in a 4–1 defeat of Bury in September 1899.
