= Henry Hird =

English footballer

Personal information
- Date of birth: 1874
- Place of birth: West Hartlepool, England
- Position: Winger

Senior career*
Years	Team	Apps	(Gls)
1897–1900	Thames Ironworks	32 (Note: Includes Southern League and London League games. The club's first team competed in the London League in the 1897–98 season and the Southern League thereafter.)	(8)
- * Club domestic league appearances and goals

Henry Hird (born 1874) was an English association footballer who played as a winger.

== Football career ==
Born in West Hartlepool, Hird moved south to work for the Thames Ironworks and Shipbuilding Company as a plater in 1897. He was a fast and tricky player renowned for his accurate crosses and described as "an out and out right winger".

He joined Thames Ironworks for season 1897–98, his high quality crosses contributed towards the Ironworks winning the 1897–98 London League. Hird is thought to be the first Ironworks player to have been sent off. In his third game, a London League game against Leyton on 30 October 1897, Hird was dismissed by the referee for disputing the awarding of a penalty. He made just one appearance in the Southern Football League Division One and played for Ironworks until his last game on 14 October 1899. With this game, his career ended abruptly for an unknown reason.

== Career statistics ==
Appearances and goals by club, season and competition
Club	Season	League			FA Cup		Total	
Club	Season	Division	Apps	Goals	Apps	Goals	Apps	Goals
Thames Ironworks	1897–98	London League	12	5	1	0	13	5
Thames Ironworks	1898–99	Southern League Division Two	19	3	3	1	22	4
Thames Ironworks	1899–1900	Southern League Division One	1	0	3	0	4	0
Thames Ironworks	Total		32	8	7	1	39	9
