= Bill Joyce =

Scottish footballer

Personal information
- Full name: William Joyce
- Date of birth: 8 April 1877
- Place of birth: Prestonpans, Scotland
- Position: Centre-forward

Senior career*
Years	Team	Apps	(Gls)
1892–1895	Morton	28	(14)
1894–1897	Bolton Wanderers	30	(16)
1898–1899	Tottenham Hotspur	40	(33)
1899–1900	Thames Ironworks	27	(8)
1900–1901	Portsmouth		
1901–1903	Burton United		
1903–1904	Morton	15	(7)
1904–1905	Motherwell	9	(3)
Total		149	(81)
- * Club domestic league appearances and goals

William Joyce (born 8 April 1877) was a Scottish footballer who played as a centre-forward in the Football League for Bolton Wanderers and Burton United. He played in Thames Ironworks' final season before reforming as West Ham United, and also played for Morton, Tottenham Hotspur, Portsmouth and Motherwell.

Joyce started his career at Morton before moving to England and Bolton Wanderers in early 1895. He suffered a broken leg while with the club in 1896.

Joyce played for Tottenham in 1898–99 (taking over from Tommy Meade who was dropped due to wage increase demands), scoring 26 goals in 38 games. He signed for Thames Ironworks for the 1899–1900 season (the club's last season before becoming West Ham United), along with Spurs colleagues Harry Bradshaw and Kenny McKay, and made 27 Southern League appearances for the club, scoring 8 goals. He also averaged a goal a game in seven FA Cup appearances that season. His three goals in a 5–1 test match victory, against Fulham at White Hart Lane on 30 April 1900, assured a league place for the successor club the following season.

Joyce went on to join Portsmouth as a replacement for Sandy Brown. At the time of the 1901 UK census he was living in the city with his wife, daughter and a boarder – fellow Pompey player Tom Wilkie. A year later, he moved to Burton United and made 29 appearances over two seasons. He later returned to Morton and played for Motherwell.
