= Tommy Moore (footballer) =

English footballer

Personal information
- Full name: Thomas Moore
- Date of birth: 1877
- Place of birth: Stoke-on-Trent, Staffordshire, England
- Position: Goalkeeper

Senior career*
Years	Team	Apps	(Gls)
1895–1898	Millwall Athletic	36	(0)
1898–1900	Thames Ironworks	48	(0)
1900	West Ham United	4	(0)
1900–?	Grays		
- * Club domestic league appearances and goals

Thomas Moore (1877 – after 1900) was an English association footballer who played as a goalkeeper.

Born in Stoke-on-Trent, Moore played for Millwall Athletic before a controversial move to local rivals Thames Ironworks, making his debut on 10 September 1898 in a 3–0 away win against Shepherd's Bush. Moore was a member of the side which won the Southern Football League second division in 1898–99. The side conceded only 16 goals in 22 games, 21 of which saw Moore in goal. Regular appearances in the side continued until Thames Ironworks folded in 1900. Their successor club West Ham United included Moore in their second game of the season on 8 September 1900, a 3–1 defeat to Millwall Athletic. He replaced Hugh Monteith who had kept goal in the opening game of the season, a 7–0 defeat to Gravesend United. Moore would play only three further games for West Ham before he left to join Grays, his place as West Ham goalkeeper returning to Hugh Monteith. Although now playing football for what was a village side, Moore was a member of the Grays side which knocked West Ham, with Monteith in goal, out of the FA Cup on 16 November 1901 at the Memorial Grounds. This game is quoted as being West Ham's first defeat in a giant-killing.

== Playing style ==
Moore was known as "The Dancing Dervish". At a time when the rules of football allowed the goalkeeper to handle the ball anywhere within his own half, he would regularly punch the ball into the opponents' penalty area. The rules also allowed the 'keeper to advance up to six yards from his goal-line at a penalty kick. Moore would often advance the full six yards and in a match in 1899 against New Brompton, he saved a penalty from his six-yard line. Short for a goalkeeper at 5 ft 8ins, his agility made up for his lack in height.
