= Charlie Dove =

English footballer

Personal information
- Full name: Charles Dove
- Date of birth: 1879
- Height: 5 ft 11 in (1.80 m)
- Position: Defender

Youth career
- Forest Swifts Juniors
- Plaistow Melville

Senior career*
Years	Team	Apps	(Gls)
1895–1900	Thames Ironworks		
1900–1901	West Ham United		
1901–1903	Millwall		
- * Club domestic league appearances and goals

Charles Dove (1879–?) was an English footballer.

== Career ==
Dove was regarded as being very physically fit for a footballer; in 1895 he stood nearly 6 feet tall and weighed 12 stone, which was considered large for a sixteen-year-old from a working-class area of Essex. His main position was defender.

He played for many local teams, winning two medals as a right back with Park School. Upon leaving school he joined Forest Swifts Juniors as a centre forward, before moving on to captain Plaistow Melville. Dove continued to make his name at Upton Park and with South West Ham.

Dove was an employee of Thames Ironworks and Shipbuilding Co. Ltd, working as an apprentice to the riveters and playing for the newly formed Thames Ironworks in 1895. The half a crown (12½p) membership would have been a third of his weekly wage.

Dove completed the distinction of playing in every position for the club when he deputised for goalkeeper Tommy Moore in an away game against Maidenhead. He kept a clean sheet as Thames Ironworks won 4–0.

Dove was part of the Thames team that won successive London League and Southern League Division Two titles. One story suggests that he had a connection with the club adopting claret and blue as their colours. He had apparently got the kits for the club at the very cheap price of £3.10s from William Belton (great-grandfather of author Brian Belton), a professional sprinter, as well as being one of the coaches at Thames Ironworks. During the summer of 1899, Belton had been at a fair in Birmingham, close to Villa Park, the home ground of Aston Villa. He had been challenged to a race against four Villa players, who wagered money that one of them would win. Belton defeated them, and when they were unable to pay the bet one of the Villa players, who was responsible for washing the team's kit, offered a complete side's 'uniforms' to Belton in payment of the bet. The Aston Villa player subsequently reported to his club that the kit was 'missing'.

Dove would continue to be a major player for Thames Ironworks, and its later incarnation of West Ham United until his controversial transfer in 1901 to arch-rivals Millwall. He made 23 Southern League appearances for Millwall during the 1901–02 season, but played only three matches in 1902–03 before an injury ended his playing career. In total he made 49 appearances for Millwall.

After football, Dove returned to his work as a shipwright, spending his last years with a daughter in Hillingdon, West London. He died sometime after 1947/8. His son, Ernest, was a career soldier, rising from private to major RAOC, serving in the BEF in France 1939/40. A grandson, Jim, was in the Royal Signals Corps, later in the New Zealand equivalent and served in the Malaya Emergency (ref.Jim Dove, grandson b. 1930, retired to NSW).
