= George Gresham =

English footballer

Personal information
- Full name: George Gresham
- Date of birth: 1874
- Place of birth: Gainsborough, Lincolnshire, England
- Date of death: Unknown
- Position: Inside forward

Senior career*
Years	Team	Apps	(Gls)
- Gainsborough Trinity
1895–1898	Thames Ironworks		
- * Club domestic league appearances and goals

George Gresham (born 1874) was a footballer who played as an inside forward.

Gresham was born in Gainsborough, Lincolnshire and played for Gainsborough Trinity of the Midland League before moving in 1895 to Thames Ironworks, the team that later became West Ham United.

Gresham worked as a ships plater at Thames Ironworks and Shipbuilding Company and played for the works team, having previously played for Trinity in his hometown. In an experimental 'floodlit friendly' on 16 March 1896, Thames Ironworks faced Woolwich Arsenal for the first time. George Gresham scored twice, in a game that Woolwich Arsenal won 5–3.

He was a regular for three seasons for "The Irons", and was part of the team that were London League champions in the 1897–98 season and Southern League Division Two champions the following year.

== See also ==
- 1895–96 Thames Ironworks F.C. season
- 1896–97 Thames Ironworks F.C. season
- 1896–97 Thames Ironworks F.C. season
