= Memorial Grounds =

Stadium located in United Kingdom

Coordinates: 51.5281°N 0.0103°E

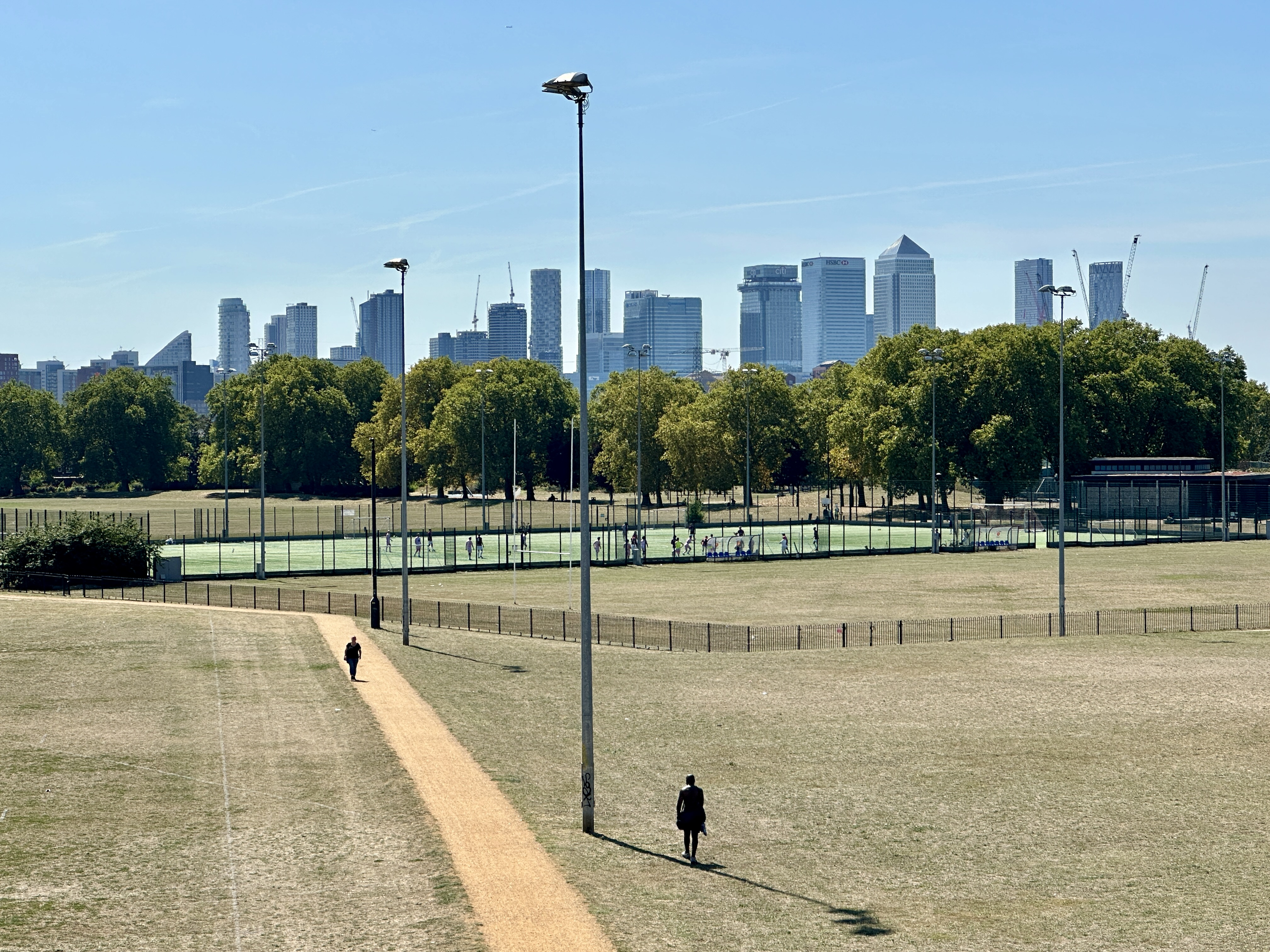
- View of Canary Wharf from the Memorial Recreation Ground
- Interactive map of Memorial Grounds
- Location: West Ham; London
- Operator: Thames Ironworks (1897 – 1900); West Ham United (1900 – 1904)

Construction
- Opened: 22 June 1897
- Closed: 1904
- Demolished: 1904
- Cost: £20,000 (1896–97)

Memorial Grounds was an outdoor stadium in West Ham that served as the home of Thames Ironworks F.C. from the beginning of the 1897–98 season, until the end of the 1899–1900 season. The team continued to play at the stadium, under its new name of West Ham United, until they moved to the Boleyn Ground in 1904. The Memorial Grounds stadium was situated at the east end of Memorial Avenue, close to where West Ham station now stands.

== Ground history ==
After being evicted from their previous permanent home at Hermit Road in October 1896, Thames' chairman Arnold Hills leased a temporary piece of land for the team at Browning Road, East Ham. However, the new situation was not ideal, so Hills earmarked a large section of land in West Ham for a new stadium to be built upon. The new home cost £20,000 of Arnold Hills' own money to build.

The Memorial Grounds was opened on Jubilee Day, 22 June 1897, to coincide with the sixtieth anniversary of Queen Victoria's coronation. Aside from a football pitch, the stadium contained a cycle track, a cinder running track, tennis courts and one of the largest outdoor swimming pools in England. It was said at the time that the grounds, with a capacity of 100,000 spectators, were "good enough to stage an English Cup Final."

In November 1897 Arnold Hills secured an agreement with London, Tilbury and Southend Railway (LT&SR) to build a station at Manor Road. The LT&SR board approved this in February 1898 and Mowlem's was given the contract to build a four platform station, allowing for the proposed quadrupling of the line. The station was completed in May 1900 but did not open until 1 February 1901 as West Ham.

On 11 September 1897, in their first game at their new ground, Thames beat Brentford 1–0. In West Ham United's first game at the grounds in front of 2,000 spectators, in the Southern League on 1 September 1900, they won 7–0 against Gravesend United, with Billy Grassam scoring four.

The Memorial Grounds was also home to National Cycle Union meets, hosted speedway and motorcycle racing, and had the longest swimming pool in Britain. The faint outline of the cycle track remained visible on aerial photographs prior to the building of new football pitches at its north end at the turn of the 21st century. The venue was the first football ground to stage a boxing match, on 31 July 1909 when Johnny Summers beat Jimmy Britt in the ninth round of a 20-round contest.

Nowadays, the site is a public park, known as Memorial Recreation Ground. It retains its sporting connection as the home of East London RFC, Kings Cross Steelers RFC and Newham Dockers Rugby League Club as well as having football facilities.

== See also ==
- Thames Ironworks F.C. 1897-1898
- Thames Ironworks F.C. 1898-1899
- Thames Ironworks F.C. 1899-1900
