= South West Ham F.C. =

South West Ham
- Full name: South West Ham Football Club
- Nickname(s): Pink Uns
- Founded: 1880s
- Dissolved: 1900s
- Ground: North Woolwich Road, Canning Town
Home colours

South West Ham Football Club was a football club based in Canning Town, England.

== History ==
South West Ham were formed in the 1880s as a club for the "healthy pursuit of football" for the working class demographic in the surrounding area. During the early years of the club, South West Ham helped produce future West Ham United players in Billy Barnes and Aubrey Fair. In 1895–96, South West Ham joined the South Essex League, finishing fourth. In 1896, South West Ham entered the FA Cup at the preliminary stage, losing 4–1 to Windsor & Eton. In 1899, the club entered the Eastern Suburban League. The club dissolved in the early 20th century.

== Ground ==
South West Ham played at the cricket ground occupied by South West Ham Cricket Club on North Woolwich Road in Canning Town.

== Records ==
- Best FA Cup performance: Preliminary round, 1896–97

== Honours ==
- South Essex League
  - Second Division (Western) champions: 1906–07
