= 3rd Grenadier Guards F.C. =

Former association football club in England

3rd Grenadier Guards F.C. were an English football team that played in the London League from as early as 1896 until 1898. During the 1896–97 season they were champions and during the 1897–98 season they finished 4th.

In the 1909–10 season they joined the Spartan League B Division. They gained promotion in their first season finishing third of sixth in their division. Participating in the Spartan League A Division for three more seasons they recorded finishes of 7th, 6th and 10th, before withdrawing in 1913.

== See also ==
- 3rd Grenadier Guards F.C. players
- Grenadier Guards
- 2nd Grenadier Guards F.C.
