= Kenny McKay =

Scottish footballer

Personal information
- Full name: Kenneth McKay
- Date of birth: c. 1876
- Place of birth: Wishaw, Lanarkshire, Scotland
- Position: Forward

Senior career*
Years	Team	Apps	(Gls)
–1896	Hamilton Academical		
1896–1898	Sheffield United	25	(4)
1898–1899	Tottenham Hotspur	17	(4)
1899–1900	Thames Ironworks	28	(8)
1900–1901	Wishaw United		
1901–?	Fulham		
- * Club domestic league appearances and goals

Kenneth McKay (circa 1876 – unknown) was a Scottish association footballer who played as a forward.

Born in Wishaw, McKay started his footballing career with Hamilton Academical before moving south to play for Sheffield United. In the 1897–98 season McKay was a member of the Sheffield side which won the 1897–98 First Division. McKay spent a single season with Tottenham Hotspur making his debut on 3 September 1898 in a 3–0 home win against Thames Ironworks at Northumberland Park. The next season, he moved to Thames Ironworks, his first goals coming on 18 September 1899 in a 4–0 home win against Chatham. The following season, he returned to Scotland, playing a single season with Wishaw United. 1901 saw him on the move again; this time back to London to play for Fulham for the 1901–02 season. In the 1902–03 season McKay was a member of the Fulham side which won the 1902–03 Southern League Second Division.
