= Arnold Hills =

English businessman, sportsman, philanthropist, and activist (1857–1927)

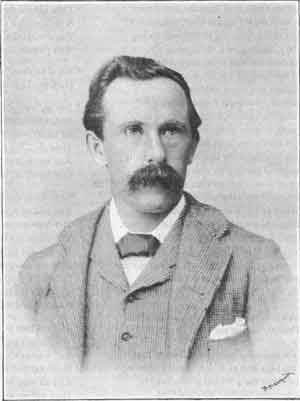
- Hills in 1889

Personal information
- Full name: Arnold Frank Hills
- Date of birth: 12 March 1857
- Place of birth: Denmark Hill, England
- Date of death: 7 March 1927 (aged 69)
- Place of death: Penshurst, England
- Position: Forward

Youth career
- Harrow School

Senior career*
Years	Team	Apps	(Gls)
- Oxford University
- Old Harrovians
- Wanderers

International career
1879	England	1	(0)
- * Club domestic league appearances and goals

Arnold Frank Hills (12 March 1857 – 7 March 1927) was an English businessman, sportsman, philanthropist, and activist. He played once for the England national football team in 1879. Hills was an advocate of temperance and vegetarianism, and served as president of the London Vegetarian Society and Vegetarian Federal Union.

== Biography ==
=== Early life ===
Hills was born in Denmark Hill, Surrey, on 12 March 1857, the son of Frank Clarke Hills, a manufacturing chemist, and Ann Ellen Hills (née Rawlings).

=== Sports career ===
Hills was a British mile champion, winning the 1878 AAC Championships title, and was the three-mile champion in 1879.

In his youth, he played football and cricket for Harrow School, where he captained the first XI. After leaving Harrow, he attended University College, Oxford, where he earned a B.A. in 1880 and two football blues. He played as a forward for Oxford University when the team finished runners-up to Wanderers in the 1877 FA Cup Final.

After leaving Oxford, Hills continued to play as an amateur for Old Harrovians and received a Corinthian's Cap while with the club. He played once for England, against Scotland on 5 April 1879 at the Kennington Oval, in a 5–4 England win.

=== Business career ===
Hills was influenced by Walter Besant's book All Sorts and Conditions of Men, and like the hero and heroine of that book, moved to the East End to be better able to understand and help his workforce. He lived for five years (1860-1885) among his workers in a small house in East India Dock Road in the Canning Town area of West Ham, and organised recreational centres for them. Although fully urbanised, West Ham was not served by the Metropolitan Board of Works or affected by government acts restricting pollution in London. As a consequence many of London's most polluting industries were channelled to the area and its infrastructure was very poor. Canning Town was notorious for its squalid conditions and open sewers.

The Little Tommy Lee sewer, an open sewer in Canning Town, c.1888

In 1896, he became the Managing Director of the yard, and at some point Chairman.

=== Founding of West Ham United ===
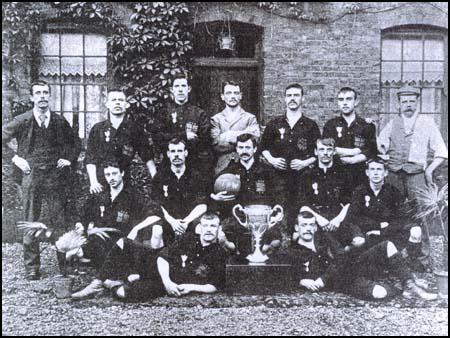
Thames Ironworks F.C. in 1896 with the West Ham Charity Cup. Arnold Hills at top left

In the summer of 1895, Hills and Dave Taylor helped found Thames Ironworks F.C., which later became West Ham United. The move would help improve industrial relations after a recent strike.

He would also establish and fund a number of other clubs and societies at the Ironworks including cricket, boxing, tennis, bowls, lacrosse, cycling, athletics, gymnastics, fencing and quoits. There was a choral society, an operatic society and orchestral and military bands. There was a Temperance League, an Ambulance Corps and a Literary and Debating Society. These societies were autonomous, having their own committees which fed into a Central Council.

Hills vision was for a club for, and of, the local community, and in particular of the Ironworks. He lamented West Ham’s shortage of playing fields and opportunities for sport generally, with most football being played in the gaps between factory and other industrial sites. Partly for this reason, he unsuccessfully campaigned for West Ham (already a fully urbanised part of London) to be part of the new County of London, so that it would have more funds available for objectives such as relieving poverty and establishing new parks.

Hills disliked professionalism, as he felt it introduced a “success at any cost” mindset that threatened the spirit of the game. He also felt that “mercenaries” would take away opportunities for local men to play, undermining the connection between the team and the area. The managing committee of the new club was much more relaxed about taking on professionals and this would lead to tension between them and their benefactor.

Despite his emphasis on participation in sport over spectator sport, Hills spent £20,000 of his own money to establish a large new park called the Memorial Grounds in 1897.The park included a vast new multi-sport stadium. There was a cycle and athletics track around the pitch and the new park had a large, 100 yard swimming pool and facilities for cricket and tennis. Hills and his wife would drive by break (a type of horse drawn vehicle) from their home at Monkhams, Woodford to watch games at the new ground. The Memorial Ground’s huge 120,000 maximum capacity (which was never approached and which was based on very crowded conditions) tended to aggravate the contradictory visions for the club as a high standard of football would be needed to attract large crowds.

On at least one occasion, Hills chartered transport to take fans to away games. In April 1897 he chartered a steamer to take the team, himself and the fans up the Thames to West London, for a fixture against Brentford.

In 1900, Hills proposed that West Ham be formed as a limited company and became its major shareholder. He encouraged business associates, family members, and his workers to invest, promising to buy one share for every share sold to the public. He rented the Memorial Grounds to the club on favourable terms. Hills told the new directors that he would not interfere in the running of the club and, despite being its largest single shareholder, did not attend annual general meetings, ask to address meetings, or present demands or suggestions.

=== Vegetarianism ===
Hills was the first president of the London Vegetarian Society, founded in 1888, and served on its executive committee with the young Mahatma Gandhi. He was also the first president of the Vegetarian Cycling and Athletic Club and president of the London Vegetarian Rambling Club. He founded The Vegetarian, an independent periodical, and the Vegetarian Federal Union in 1889, of which he was also president. He founded the Oriolet Fruitarian Hospital at Loughton, under the medical direction of Josiah Oldfield.

In an article titled "Milk and Eggs", Hills described milk, cream, butter, cheese, and eggs as "props of a transition period" rather than part of the vegetarian ideal. He argued that milk and eggs were foods naturally intended for young animals and human infants, and that adults should move beyond them. He criticised the use of milk, cream, butter, and especially cheese on physiological grounds, claiming that cheese was made indigestible by fermentation. Hills also rejected eggs as less digestible when cooked, and said that reliance on milk and eggs was justified only by social convenience. He urged vegetarian "experimentalists" to replace them with fruit, nuts, and grains.

In 1892, Hills authored Vital Food, in which he argued for a plant-based raw food diet.

=== Other interests ===
Hills campaigned for the restoration of the Thames Steamboat passenger service along the Thames.

=== Later life and death ===
Hills began to show progressive symptoms of a disease variously described as rheumatism, arthritis or a 'wasting disease', which left him completely incapacitated by 1906. The Daily Mail described him as "The invalid builder of dreadnoughts".Shortly before he died he had a slight recovery which meant he was once again able to move his hand enough to sign his name. His ill health was possibly the result of overwork.

With the closing of the ironworks, Hills retired to a new home called Hammerfield, at Penshurst, in Kent. In 1900 he donated £4000 to establish a village hall and club in Penshurst, in memory of his parents and brothers. The building included a reading room, entertainment room, temperance bar, billiard room, fitted stage and green room, and seating for 300 people.

Hills commissioned and funded Penshurst Village Hall

He died there in 1927, aged 69, and was buried at St Luke's Church at Chiddingstone Causeway in Penshurst. The church was been commissioned by his sister in law, Constance Hills, and Arnold Hills donated the land it was built on, and contributed to the building fund.

His shareholding in West Ham, 1,100 of 4,000 shares, passed to his family; 1,142 shares remained unsold until 1961.

== Legacy ==
Charles W. Forward's 1898 history of vegetarianism, Fifty Years of Food Reform, was dedicated to Hills.

In 2014, as part of its preparations for moving to the Olympic Stadium, West Ham announced that one of its corporate entertainment areas would be a private dining club named the Arnold Hills suite.

== Publications ==
- Vital Food (1892)
- Vegetarian Essays (1897)
- Essays on Vegetarianism (1910)
