= Syd King =

English footballer (1873–1933)

Personal information
- Date of birth: 1 August 1873
- Place of birth: Chatham, Kent, England
- Date of death: 14 February 1933 (aged 59)
- Place of death: England
- Position: Defender

Senior career*
Years	Team	Apps	(Gls)
–1897	Northfleet		
1897–1899	New Brompton		
1899–1900	Thames Ironworks	16	(0)
1900–1903	West Ham United	59	(0)

Managerial career
- 1902–1932: West Ham United
- * Club domestic league appearances and goals

Ernest Sydney "Syd" King (1 August 1873 – 14 February 1933) was an English footballer and manager, and one of the most important figures in the early history of West Ham United.

== Playing career ==
Born Chatham, Kent and educated at Watford Grammar School for Boys, he started his career as a full back with Northfleet and had been club captain. He once scored three own-goals when playing against Swindon Town.

He transferred to New Brompton in 1897 and spent two seasons there before joining Thames Ironworks in 1899. He was considered one of the best full backs in the Southern League and "The Irons" had to immediately turn down Derby County's offer for the player.

Syd' King recorded 16 appearances in their first season in the Southern League Division One, also making seven appearances in the FA Cup that year, an impressive run that ended in a 1–2 home defeat against arch-rivals Millwall Athletic.

In 1900 he was retained as a member of the squad after the club's transition to West Ham United, and continued to play for them until 1903, recording 59 league and 7 FA Cup appearances in total.

== Managerial career ==
The boss at West Ham was Syd King, an outsize, larger-than-life character with close-cropped grey hair and a flowing moustache. He was a personality plus man, a man with flair. Awe struck, I would tip-toe past his office but invariably he would spot me. "Boy," he would shout. "Get me two bottles of Bass." Down to the Boleyn pub on the corner I would go on my errand and when I got back to the office Syd King would flip me a two-shilling piece for my trouble."

— At Home With The Hammers (1960) by Ted Fenton, West Ham United player (1932-46) and manager (1950-61)

At the start of his last season as a player he had been appointed club secretary, although he was already considered to be a 'manager' of the club.

On the eve of the 1904–05 season a small postcard of the team photograph was issued and featured the following text from King on its reverse endorsing Oxo:

"When training, Oxo is the only beverage used by our team and all speak of the supreme strength and power of endurance which they have derived from its use." - E. S. King, Secretary, West Ham United F.C.

His tenure at West Ham included their election to the Football League in 1919, which coincided with a personal cheque from the board for £1,500 that paid tribute to his twenty years of service for the club. His basic wage was also raised to £10 a week.

February 1922 saw the controversial sale of West Ham legend Syd Puddefoot to Falkirk for a record £5,000. For negotiating the transfer, Syd King received a £300 bonus. By this time he was also on a £100 annual bonus.

The following season West Ham reached the FA Cup Final for the first time, losing to Bolton Wanderers but also assured their place in the top division finishing as Division Two runners up. An edition of local newspaper East Ham Echo proclaimed in 1923 that:

"Syd King is West Ham and West Ham is Syd King."

Following promotion Syd King instilled a period of consolidation for West Ham in the First Division, the highlight of which was the 1926–27 season when West Ham finished in 6th place in Division One. This performance was not equalled by the Hammers until the 1958–1959 season during Ted Fenton's tenure. Part of the reason that this consistency was possible, was due to Syd King signing players that went on to become West Ham legends and record holders, as well as England internationals, including Jimmy Ruffell, Ted Hufton and Vic Watson.

Syd King was appointed a shareholder of West Ham United in 1931, but the team was relegated in the 1931–32 season back to Division Two. On 5 November 1932 West Ham lost their ninth game of the next season, against Bradford Park Avenue, and at the same day's board meeting, according to one board member, "during the discussion on the team, (King) was "drunk and insubordinate." It was no secret that King "liked a drink", but he had already been appeased by the board many times over the issue. On the following day they announced that:

"It was unanimously decided that until further notice C. Paynter be given sole control of players and that E. S. King be notified accordingly."

It was also postulated by the board, but never confirmed, that King had been syphoning off West Ham funds for himself. He was suspended for three months without pay and also banned from entering the Boleyn Ground. Following a board meeting on 3 January 1933 his contract was terminated permanently, and he was given an ex-gratia payment of £3 a week.

== Death ==
Although comparatively rich for an ex-player working in football, King's reputation as well as his career were in tatters. Within a month of the sacking he committed suicide by drinking alcohol mixed with a corrosive liquid.

The inquest into his death declared that he had taken his life 'while of unsound mind', and had been suffering from persecution delusions. According to his son at the inquest, his depression had begun when the team were relegated in the summer of 1932, and that his paranoia had followed on from that.

== Personal life ==
King was a freemason, initiated into the Merchant Navy Lodge No 781 in 1905. He, along with 25 others including Henry Norris, unsuccessfully petitioned for an association football lodge in 1920.
