= Thames Ironworks F.C. =

Thames Ironworks
- Full name: Thames Ironworks Football Club
- Nicknames: The Irons; The Tee-totallers
- Founded: 1895
- Dissolved: 1900 (now West Ham United)
- Ground: Hermit Road 1895–1896; Browning Road 1896; Memorial Grounds 1897–1900 and until 1904 as West Ham Utd.
- Capacity: 17,000
- Chairman: Francis Payne
- Club Secretaries: Dave Taylor 1895; Ted Harsent 1895–1897; Francis Payne 1897–1899; George Neil 1899–1900
- League: London League 1896–1898; Southern League 1898–1900
Home colours

Thames Ironworks Football Club, the club that later became West Ham United, was founded by Thames Ironworks and Shipbuilding Company owner Arnold Hills and foreman Dave Taylor in 1895. Thames Ironworks took over the tenancy of The Old Castle Swifts' Hermit Road ground in Canning Town until their eventual eviction in October 1896. They would briefly play at Browning Road in East Ham, before moving to the Memorial Grounds, a stadium which was situated close to where West Ham station now stands. The ground was built at Arnold Hills's own expense, costing £20,000.

Thames Ironworks were West Ham Charity Cup winners in 1895–96 and London League runners up and champions in 1896–97 and 1897–98. They were promoted to Southern League Division One in 1898–99 as Southern League Division Two Champions. They retained their Southern League status the following season by beating Fulham 5–1 in a Test Match. At the end of June 1900, Thames Ironworks F.C. resigned from the Southern League and were officially wound up. On 5 July 1900 they reformed under the new name of West Ham United F.C. and accepted an offer of the Southern League place left vacant by Thames Ironworks.

== History ==
=== Formation ===
"In the summer of 1895, when the clanging of "hammers" was heard on the banks of Father Thames and the great warships were rearing their heads above the Victoria Dock Road, a few enthusiasts, with the love of football within them, were talking about the grand old game and the formation of a club for the workers of the Thames Iron Works Limited. There were platers and riveters in the Limited who had chased the big ball in the north country. There were men among them who had learned to give the subtle pass and to urge the leather goalwards. No thought of professionalism, I may say, was ever contemplated by the founders. They meant to run their club on amateur lines and their first principal was to choose their team from men in the works."

– Syd King, Thames Ironworks player and West Ham United manager 1902–1932.

Thames Ironworks F.C. was founded by Dave Taylor and Arnold Hills in 1895 as the works team of the Thames Iron Works, which was located in Limmo Peninsula in Canning Town, East London. Taylor was a foreman with the company and a local football referee. Thanks to Ironworks owner Arnold Hills' financial backing, he was able to announce on 29 June 1895 the following in the company's weekly journal:

"Mr. Taylor, who is working in the shipbuilding department, has undertaken to get up a football club for next winter and I learn that quoits and bowls will also be added to the attractions." – Thames Iron Works Gazette.

Fifty would-be players paid half-a-crown for a year's membership, and Taylor spent the summer arranging the fixtures for Thames Ironworks F.C. and their reserves. Before the Irons played their first game, Taylor returned to refereeing, handing over organizational duties to Ted Harsent, who became the first club secretary.

The birth of Thames Ironworks F.C. coincided with the demise of Old Castle Swifts, the first professional football club in Essex. Thames took over the tenancy of Castle Swifts' Hermit Road ground in Canning Town and signed a number of Old Castle Swifts players, including former Woolwich Arsenal full back Robert Stevenson, who became the club's first captain and is credited as being the team's first player of note.

=== 1895–1896 ===
The Ironworks played their first fixture against Royal Ordnance reserves on 7 September 1895, the game ending 1–1. One of the players likely to have been involved in this first game was Iron Works employee Charlie Dove, who had played at full-back and centre forward during his time as a junior player. Dove would be mainly used as a right-half, but would play every position for The Irons during his time with them. Looking to bolster their attacking strength, the Irons had also recruited Ironworks employee George Gresham, an inside-forward who had played for Gainsborough Trinity, who would go on to score many goals for the club in the following four seasons.

In what would be their first competitive game, Thames Ironworks took on Chatham Town in the first qualifying round of the FA Cup on 12 October, losing 0–5 before a crowd of 3,000.

Their biggest defeat came on 14 December when they lost in a friendly game away to Millwall Athletic 0–6. Millwall were also an 'Iron Works' side, whose south London company competed with Thames Iron Works for contracts. The rivalry between the two clubs would continue into the present day.

Following a number of trials against local sides, 16 March saw an experimental 'floodlit friendly' at the Hermit Road ground for Thames Ironworks, in their first encounter with Woolwich Arsenal that finished in favour of Woolwich Arsenal 5–3. These early attempts at floodlighting were set up using Thames Iron Works engineers and equipment, and caused an amount of notoriety. They were also used for "The Irons" next game against West Bromwich Albion, which they lost 2–4.

An epic confrontation followed as Thames Ironworks faced Barking in the final of the West Ham Charity Cup on 21 March 1896 at The Old Spotted Dog Ground in Upton Lane. Drawing 2–2, the match was replayed a week later, and again the teams drew, this time 0–0. Eventually the final was replayed for the second time on 20 April 1896 and "The Irons" won 1–0, lifting a trophy in their first season.

=== 1896–1897 ===
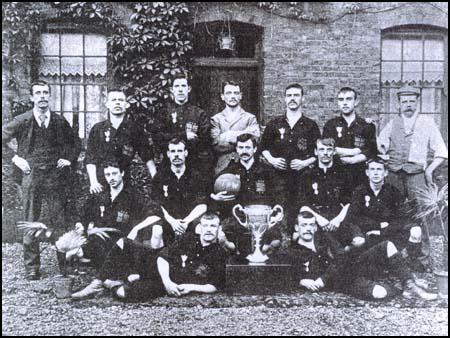
The Ironworks in 1896 with the West Ham Charity Cup.

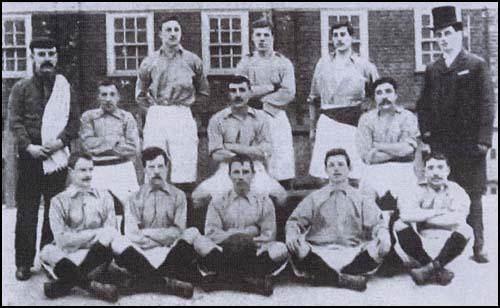
The Ironworks team of 1897.

Thames Ironworks F.C. entered the London League for the 1896–97 season, even though the West Ham area was still officially part of Essex at the time. However, it was a seamless transition for the club to make as Thames Ironworks owner Arnold Hills was also president of the London League, and along with Thames Ironworks F.C. committee chairman Francis Payne, helped to draft the competition's rules.

In their first competitive league fixture in the London League, staged at the Hermit Road ground, on 19 September 1896 Thames Ironworks beat the Vampires 3–0.

The following month, "The Irons" went out in the FA Cup first qualifying round for the second year running, losing 0–8 away to Kent Southern League team Sheppey United on 10 October 1897. Shortly after their exit from the FA Cup they were handed an eviction notice from the Hermit Road ground for violating their tenancy agreement and had to play their next four fixtures at the grounds of their opponents, until a new home could be found. The first of these games was against eventual champions 3rd Grenadier Guards on 22 October 1896, which they lost 1–4. By the turn of 1897 Arnold Hills had managed to lease a temporary piece of land for the team, located in Browning Road, East Ham.

"The Irons" managed to make the final of the West Ham Charity Cup for the second year running, and on 20 March 1896 they narrowly lost the final 0–1 to West Ham Garfield. It was also around that time that Thames Ironworks' inspirational captain Robert Stevenson left to return to his native Scotland to play for Arthurlie.

Thames Ironworks' biggest defeat of the season came soon after, on 1 April 1897, when they lost for the second time to the champions-elect 3rd Grenadier Guards 0–5 at Browning Road. Yet it was only two days later, when in another home game, that the Irons recorded their season's biggest league win when they beat Crouch End 4–1.

Their first appearance in the London League had seen them finish fourth, but only temporarily. The 1st Scots Guards had withdrawn from the league during the season, and their record was deleted, and the London Welsh team had been suspended towards the end of the season. The Irons had not yet played London Welsh and as a result, and probably thanks also to Arnold Hills' presidency of the league and Francis Payne's drafting of the rules, Thames Ironworks F.C. were awarded two wins by default and finished the revised league as runners up.

=== 1897–1898 ===
For their season in the London League, the club committee introduced players' insurance for the first time. This meant the players would be covered against loss of wages caused by injuries sustained from playing football. On 11 September 1897, in their first game of the new season of the London League and also at their new Memorial Grounds stadium, Thames beat Brentford 1–0. "The Irons" went on to win their first six London League games.

Thames Ironworks faced St Albans F.C. in the FA Cup on 16 October 1897 and lost the game 0–2. Disappointment soon faded, and it was perhaps in the third London League game away to champions 3rd Grenadier Guards, that "The Irons" found real belief in their ability to challenge for the London League. The managed to win 1–0 against a team who had beaten them 4–1 and 5–0 during the previous season. 1897 ended with Thames Ironworks top of the table and unbeaten in the London League, having only conceded five goals, three of them coming in a 3–3 thriller against local rivals Ilford.

Their highest scoring game of the season came on 15 January 1898, with a 'ten goal thriller' against Bromley going The Ironworks' way 7–3. Their impressive league run continued until the penultimate fixture of the London League season against second placed Brentford. Brentford were only one point behind "The Irons" and the game caused much local interest, including a newspaper article on Thames Ironworks' rising star Charlie Dove. At Shooters Field on 23 April 1898, Thames lost the tie 0–1, and Brentford leap-frogged "The Irons" and were now one point ahead with one game left to play.

A final day victory away to 2nd Grenadier Guards on 30 April ensured that Thames Ironworks won the London League title by a single point, as fellow challengers Brentford lost to Barking Woodville. Thames had finished the season with a 100% home record. In total they had won twelve and drawn three of their sixteen London League games, only losing in the game away to Brentford. On the way to the title they had scored 47 goals and conceded 15, the best offensive and defensive record in the division. Thames Ironworks F.C. were also successful in their application to the Southern League and would begin the following season in the Southern League Division Two.

=== 1898–1899 ===
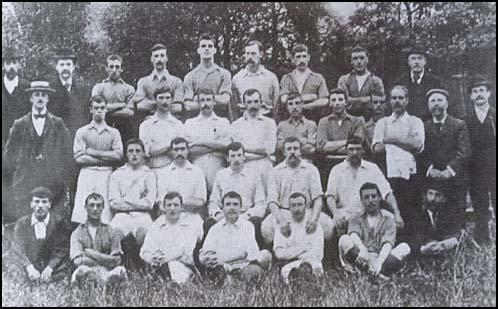
The 1899 team.

During the summer of 1898, Thames Ironworks F.C. became a professional outfit for the first time, to match their new status as members of the Southern League. New signings came thick and fast and included the controversial capture of goalkeeper Tommy Moore from arch-rivals Millwall Athletic. The team further strengthened defensively with the signing of Scottish left-half Roddy McEachrane, who worked at the Iron Works. The team's attacking options were increased with the signings of winger Patrick Leonard from Manchester City and the snaring of centre forward David Lloyd from former rivals 3rd Grenadier Guards.

They kicked off the season on 10 September 1898 away to Shepherd's Bush, and were in fine form, beating the West London outfit 3–0. In a Southern League game away to Wycombe Wanderers on 29 October, The Irons missed their train and arrived at the ground an hour late. The obviously unsettled side lost the game 1–4. This was to be Thames Ironworks' last defeat of the season, and they could go on to win an impressive 17 of their last 18 games, drawing the other game. In an away game against Maidenhead on 31 December 1898, which Thames Ironworks won 4–0, Charlie Dove completed the distinction of playing in every position for the club when he deputised for goalkeeper Tommy Moore.

Thames Ironworks played their first game of the new year at the Memorial Grounds on 14 January 1899, when they entertained Wycombe. This time, the Wycombe goalkeeper missed the train, and the team began the game with only ten players on the pitch. The final score of 4–1 was a complete reverse of their previous encounter.

Already confirmed as Southern League Division Two champions, having won the previous 14 games, Thames Ironworks showed little restraint for the final game of the season against Maidenhead on 15 April 1899. With the largest home crowd of the season of 3000 spectators, The Irons demolished the bottom club of the division 10–0. The goals included four from Patrick Leonard and a hat-trick from David Lloyd. Although they won the Southern League Second Division by 9 points, Thames Ironworks were required to play Test Matches to decide their promotion to Division One. The first came against Cowes Sports on 22 April. The game was played at the supposedly neutral East Ferry Road ground of Irons' rivals Millwall. A 10,000 strong crowd saw Thames Ironworks win the game 3–1, with goals coming from David Lloyd, Patrick Leonard and Henderson.

The Ironworks then had to face Sheppey United, who had finished 12th in the 13 team Southern League Division One, and had beaten The Irons two and a half years previously 8–0 in an FA Cup game. The game took place at Chatham Town's ground on 29 April and finished 1–1, with David Lloyd once again the goalscorer. Before a replay could be staged, it was decided to enlarge the top division of the Southern League to 19 teams, thus enabling Thames Ironworks F.C. to join the higher tier.

=== 1899–1900 ===
To bolster the squad for their first season in Southern League Division One, Arnold Hills supplied a transfer fund of £1,000 to club secretary Francis Payne, who raided Tottenham Hotspur for inside-right Kenny McKay, centre-forward Bill Joyce and left-winger Tom Bradshaw, who was immediately appointed captain of the team. Bradshaw was a former England international, who was Liverpool's first player to achieve international recognition. Payne also brought in left-back Syd King from New Brompton, who would go on to become West Ham's first manager in 1902. Players to leave the club in the summer included the men Bradshaw had replaced at outside-left and as captain. Patrick Leonard, returned to Manchester City and Walter Tranter, signed for Chatham Town but would return as a West Ham United player twelve months later. Before the season began, Francis Payne was suspended by The Football Association for tapping-up a Birmingham player and soon resigned his post as club secretary. He was replaced in the position by Irons defender George Neil, thus beginning a history of the team appointing from within.

Thames Ironworks lost their first fixture in the Southern League Division One 1–0 away at Reading on 16 September 1899, but managed their biggest league win of the season only two days later with 4–0 home win against Chatham Town. Thames Ironworks recorded their biggest win of the season, in the third qualifying round of the FA Cup on 28 October, trouncing Dartford away 7–0. However, The Irons good form soon ended on 4 November when in a league game they lost 7–0 at White Hart Lane to Tottenham Hotspur.

Thames Ironworks managed to steady the ship with a 0–0 home draw against New Brompton on 11 November. Only a week later, the teams met again in the fourth qualifying round of the FA Cup, and after another 0–0 draw at Priestfield, the replay went Thames Ironworks' way 2–0 at home. The win set up a tie against arch rivals Millwall. The clearly ailing Tom Bradshaw, whose health had steadily been deteriorating for some time, was rested for the next two games, in preparation for the tie against Millwall.

The Irons' 9 December FA Cup game at home to Millwall attracted their biggest attendance of the season with 13,000 Londoners making the tie. Tom Bradshaw, got the only goal in a 1–2 defeat that would be his last game for the club. On 25 December, after lengthy illness, Bradshaw died. His cause of death was recorded as consumption. The disillusioned Thames Ironworks team would record seven successive defeats but a further five wins and four draws would be enough for them to avoid bottom place.

"The Irons" won the last three games of the season, including a 4–1 victory over Southern League Division One Champions and FA Cup Finalists Southampton, with Bill Joyce's second hat-trick of the season making the difference. The last game of the season arrived on 28 April when The Irons beat Millwall away 1–0. Thames Ironworks finished 14 out of 15 in the Southern League Division One and would be required to play a Test Match to preserve their divisional status. Only two days later at a game held at Tottenham Hotspur's White Hart Lane Ground, The Irons faced a Fulham team featuring former centre-forward David Lloyd. Thames Ironworks won 5–1, with Bill Joyce claiming his third hat-trick of the season at his former stomping ground. Thames Ironworks had survived their first season in the top division of the Southern League.

=== West Ham United ===
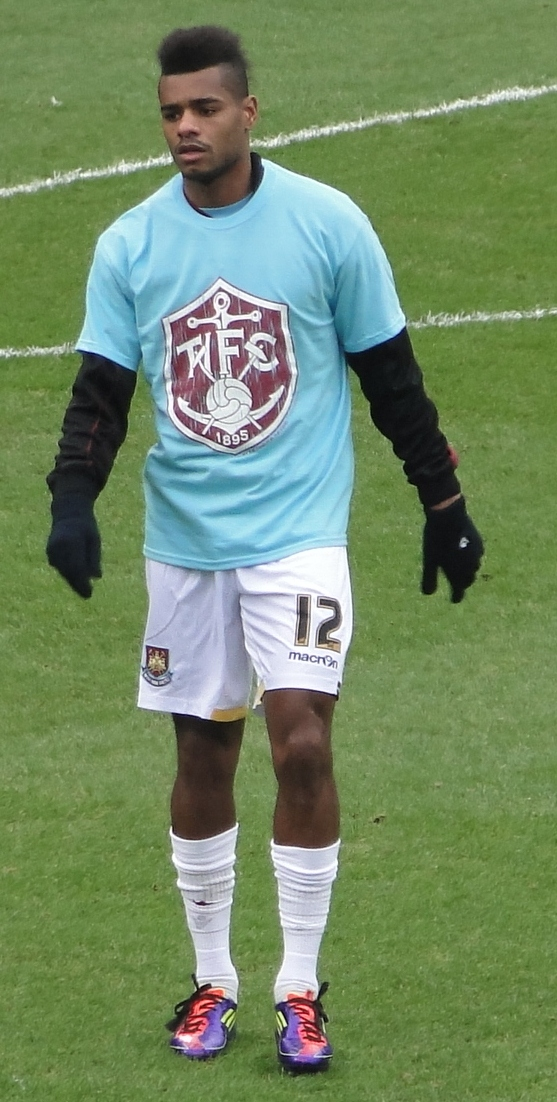
West Ham United player Ricardo Vaz Tê wearing a Thames Ironworks shirt, 2012

In June 1900, club chairman Arnold Hill's Thames Ironworks and Shipbuilding Company acquired another engineering firm in a financial takeover and became a limited company for the first time. 4,000 ten shilling shares (50p) were sold to Iron Works staff and the general public, with Arnold Hills generous enough to match sales of any shares one-to-one. At the end of June, Thames Ironworks F.C. resigned from the Southern League and were officially wound up.

On 5 July 1900 they reformed under the new name of West Ham United and accepted an offer of the Southern League place left vacant by Thames Ironworks. Lew Bowen, a Welsh clerk at the Iron Works Company was appointed as the first West Ham United club secretary. Bowen had previously written Thames Ironworks match reports for the Thames Iron Works Gazette, also known as TIWG. He would retain twelve Thames Ironworks players for the following season. These included goalkeeper Tommy Moore, full-backs Syd King and Charlie Craig, wing-halves Charlie Dove and Roddy McEachrane, as well as wingers Frank Taylor, Bob Allan and Fred Corbett. Former club secretary and Ironworks defender George Neil was also retained for the new season ahead. Tom Bradshaw's close friends Bill Joyce and Kenny McKay left for Portsmouth and Fulham respectively, while Albert Carnelly joined arch-rivals Millwall.

== Club badge and colours ==
The first, and only, known crest to be featured on a Thames Ironworks kit was the Union Flag with Thames Ironworks initials ("TIWFC") surrounding it.

The original colours of the team were dark blue due to Arnold Hills being a former student and football Blue of Oxford University, although the team used a variety of kits. They often used the claret and sky blue house colours of the actual Iron Works and would also wear all sky blue or white uniforms. They permanently adopted claret and blue for home games in the summer of 1899. Irons right-half Charlie Dove had got the kits for the club from William Belton, who was a professional sprinter of national repute, as well as being involved with the coaching at Thames Ironworks. Belton had been at a fair in Birmingham, close to Villa Park, the home ground of Aston Villa and was challenged to a race against four Villa players, who wagered money that one of them would win. Belton defeated them, and when they were unable to pay the bet, one of the Villa players who was responsible for washing the team's kit offered a complete side's 'uniforms' to him in payment of the bet. The Aston Villa player subsequently reported to his club that the kit was 'missing'. Thames Ironworks, and later West Ham United, would continue to use their previously favoured colours for their away kits. In recent years the club have committed to a sky blue-white-dark blue rotation, each kit having a one-season shelf life.

== Home venues ==
Thames Ironworks F.C. originally played at Hermit Road in Canning Town. They had taken over the tenancy from the defunct Old Castle Swifts. Hermit Road had been described as a 'cinder' heap' and 'barren waste'. It was surrounded by a moat and had canvas sheeting for fencing. On 12 October, Thames' had to play their first competitive game at the ground of Chatham Town in a preliminary qualifying round of the FA Cup as the opposing team had rated Hermit Road as "unsuitable".

In October 1897, Thames Ironworks were handed an eviction notice from the Hermit Road ground. The club had violated their tenancy agreement by charging admission fees and building a perimeter fence and pavilion. Thames Ironworks played their next few fixtures at the grounds of their opponents, until, at the turn of 1897, Arnold Hills managed to lease a temporary piece of land for the team, located in Browning Road, East Ham. However, the new situation was not ideal, as explained by future Ironworks player and West Ham United manager Syd King in his 1906 book:

"For some reason, not altogether explained, the local public at this place did not take kindly to them and the records show that Browning Road was a wilderness both in the manner of luck and support." -Syd King, Book of Football (1906)

Arnold Hills earmarked a large piece of land in Canning Town and would eventually spend £20,000 on the construction of a new stadium but the ground would not be ready until the following season. The Memorial Grounds were opened on Jubilee Day, 1897, to coincide with the sixtieth anniversary of Queen Victoria to the throne. It was situated close to where West Ham station now stands. The site retains its sporting connection in present times as the home of East London RFC and Phantoms RFC. Aside from a football pitch, the stadium contained a cinder running track for athletics, a cycle track and tennis courts, as well as one of the biggest outdoor swimming pools in England. It was said at the time that the grounds were "good enough to stage an English Cup Final." On 11 September 1897, in their first game of the new season of the London League and also at their new ground, Thames beat Brentford 1–0. West Ham United would continue to use the stadium until their move to the Boleyn Ground in 1904.

== Players ==
=== Player records ===
- These lists feature appearances & goals in the Southern League, London League, South Essex League, Thames & Medway Combination, FA Cup, London Senior Cup, Essex Senior Cup and West Ham Charity Cup. They do not include friendly or reserve statistics.

Appearances

1. 92 Charlie Dove 1895–1900
2. 88 Roddy McEachrane 1898–1900
3. 82 Tommy Moore 1898–1900
4. 69 George Gresham 1895–1899
5. 68 Walter Tranter 1897–1899
6. 53 Tommy Dunn 1899–1900
7. 52 Henry Hird 1897–1899
8. 49 Jimmy Reid 1897–1899
9. 49 Simon Chisholm 1897–1899
10. 46 Kenny McKay 1899–1900
- A more comprehensive list can be found at
  Thames Ironworks F.C. statistics

Goals

1. 30 George Gresham 1895–1899
2. 27 Jimmy Reid 1897–1899
3. 21 Bill Joyce 1899–1900
4. 20 David Lloyd 1898–1899
5. 20 Albert Carnelly 1899–1900
6. 17 Kenny McKay 1899–1900
7. 12 Henry Hird 1897–1899
8. 11 Charlie Dove 1895–1900
9. 10 R. Henderson 1898–1899
10. 10 Robert Hounsell 1897–1899

=== Club captains ===
Captain	Period
(Scotland) Robert Stevenson	1895–1897
(England) Walter Tranter	1897–1899
(England) Thomas Bradshaw	1899
(England) Charlie Dove	1899–1900

== Statistics ==
=== Honours ===
- Southern League Division Two Champions: 1898–99
- London League Champions: 1897–98, Runners Up: 1896–97
- West Ham Charity Cup Winners: 1895–96, Runners Up: 1896–97

=== League status ===
- 1896–1898: London League
- 1898–1899: Southern League Division Two
- 1899–1900: Southern League Division One

== In popular culture ==
Thames Ironworks F.C. is featured in the TV series Ripper Street series 4 episode 5 "Men of Iron, Men of Smoke".

== Bibliography ==
- Belton, Brian (2006). West Ham United Miscellany. Pennant Books. ISBN 0-9550394-4-4.
- Belton, Brian (2010). Founded on Iron. The History Press. ISBN 978-0-7524-2928-1.
- Blows, Kirk; Hogg, Tony (2000). The Essential History of West Ham United. Headline. ISBN 0-7472-7036-8.
- Northcutt, John; Marsh, Steve (2015). West Ham United: The Complete Record. deCoubertin Books. ISBN 978-1-909245-27-3.
- Powles, John (2005). Iron in the Blood. Nottingham: Soccerdata. ISBN 1-899468-22-6.
