= 1895–96 Thames Ironworks F.C. season =

English football team season

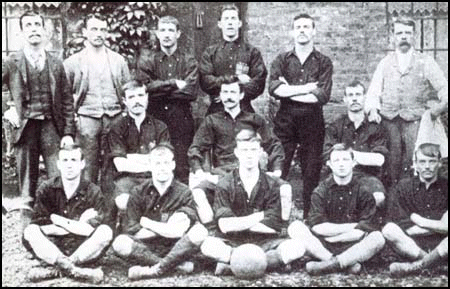
The Thames Ironworks founding team

Thames Ironworks F.C. 1895–96

"In the summer of 1895, when the clanging of "hammers" was heard on the banks of Father Thames and the great warships were rearing their heads above the Victoria Dock Road, a few enthusiasts, with the love of football within them, were talking about the grand old game and the formation of a club for the workers of the Thames Iron Works Limited. There were platers and riveters in the Limited who had chased the big ball in the north country. There were men among them who had learned to give the subtle pass and to urge the leather goalwards. No thought of professionalism, I may say, was ever contemplated by the founders. They meant to run their club on amateur lines and their first principal was to choose their team from men in the works."

– Syd King, Thames Ironworks player and West Ham United manager 1902–1932.

The 1895–96 season was the inaugural season of Thames Ironworks, the club that would later become West Ham United. The club was founded by Dave Taylor and Arnold Hills in 1895 as the works team of the Thames Ironworks and Shipbuilding Company. Taylor was a foreman at the Ironworks and a local football referee. Thanks to Ironworks owner Arnold Hills' financial backing, he was able to announce on 29 June 1895 the following in the company's weekly journal:

"Mr. Taylor, who is working in the shipbuilding department, has undertaken to get up a football club for next winter and I learn that quoits and bowls will also be added to the attractions." – Thames Iron Works Gazette.

Fifty would-be players paid half-a-crown for a year's membership, and Taylor spent the summer arranging the fixtures for Thames Ironworks F.C. and their reserves. Before the Irons played their first game Taylor returned to refereeing, handing over organizational duties to Ted Harsent.

The birth of Thames Ironworks F.C. coincided with the demise of Old Castle Swifts, the first professional football club in Essex. Thames took over the tenancy of Castle Swifts' Hermit Road ground in Canning Town and also signed four of their players. The Hermit Road ground had been described as a 'cinder heap' and 'barren waste'. It was surrounded by a moat and had canvas sheeting for fencing.

The Swifts that joined the Ironworks team were right-back and winger Robert Stevenson and forwards Jamie Lindsay and George Sage. Scotsman Bob Stevenson became the club's first ever captain and he is credited as being the team's first player of note. He would also play at full-back and centre-forward during his Irons career.

Looking to bolster their attacking strength, the Irons had also recruited Ironworks employee George Gresham, an inside-forward who had played for Gainsborough Trinity, who would go on to score many goals for the club in the following four seasons.

The original colours of the team were Oxford Blue due to Arnold Hills being a former student of the University of Oxford, although they used a variety of kits, often wearing navy blue or white. The Ironworks played their first ever fixture against Royal Ordnance reserves on 7 September 1895, the game ending 1–1.

Other players likely to have been involved in this first game were Iron Works employee Charlie Dove, who had played at full-back and centre forward during his time as a school player, and Essex cricketer John Wood, who was the cousin of jockey Fred Archer. Dove was mainly used as a defender by The Irons, but would play every position for them during his stay there.

The Irons' biggest win of the season came in their third friendly fixture on 28 September 1895 when they beat Manor Park 8–0.

The newly formed club had the audacity to enter the FA Cup competition, as recorded in the Thames Iron Works Gazette:

"Having some good men in the club, we somewhat presumptuously considered it would be wise to enter for the English Association Cup."

In Thames' first competitive game they took on Chatham in a preliminary qualifying round of the FA Cup . The match was played at Chatham's ground in Kent as they had rated the Irons' Hermit Road Ground as unsuitable. On 12 October before a crowd of 3,000 they lost to Chatham 5-0.

Their biggest defeat came on 14 December when they lost in an away game to Iron Works rivals Millwall 6-0.

25 December saw Thames Ironworks face South West Ham at home, and they won 4–1, beginning a run of ten straight wins that ended on 17 February 1896, when they lost to South London team Vampires F.C. 3-1.

In the semi-finals of the West Ham Charity Cup held on 15 February 1896, Thames Ironworks beat Park Grove 1–0, in a game staged in Plaistow. Park Grove protested over a technicality and forced a replay at Beckton Road, which The Ironworks won 3–0.

On 7 March Thames Ironworks played Fulham for the first time in a friendly, winning the game 5–1.

Following a number of trials against local sides, 16 March saw an experimental 'floodlit friendly' at the Hermit Road ground for Thames Ironworks, in their first encounter with Woolwich Arsenal. George Gresham scored twice, in an epic encounter that finished in favour of Woolwich Arsenal 5–3. George Gresham scored two of the Irons goals that day.

These early attempts at floodlighting were set up using Thames Iron Works engineers and equipment, and caused an amount of notoriety. They were also used for "The Irons" next game, in their first ever meeting with West Bromwich Albion, which they lost 4-2.

The following day, an epic confrontation followed as Thames Ironworks faced Barking in the final of the West Ham Charity Cup on 21 March 1896 at The Old Spotted Dog Ground in Upton Lane. Drawing 2–2, the match was replayed a week later, and again the teams drew, this time 0–0. Eventually the final was replayed for the second time on 20 April 1896 and the Irons won 1–0, lifting a trophy in their first ever season.

Thames Ironworks won 30 of their 47 games in the 1895–96 season, drawing 5 and losing 12.

They scored 136 goals and conceded 68.

== Squad statistics ==
No.		Player	Position	FA Apps	FA Gls	WHCC Apps	WHCC Gls	Friendly Apps	Friendly Gls	Total Apps	Total Gls	Date Signed	Previous Club
Thames Ironworks F.C. XI with most appearances
1	(England)	Hugh Graham	GK			4		18		22		1895	
2	(England)	Jas Taylor	RB (LB)					18		18		1895	
3	(England)	Joseph Hurst	LB (RB)					15		15		1895	
4	(England)	William Morton	RH (LH/CF)					18		18		1895	
5	(England)	Collins	CH (LH)					22	1	22	1	1895	
6	(England)	John Thomas Archer Woods	LH (OF/RH/IL)	1		4		18	1	23	1	1895	Old Castle Swifts F.C.
7	(Scotland)	Robert Stevenson (captain)	OR (CF/FB)			4	3	20	5	24	8	1895	Woolwich Arsenal & Old Castle Swifts F.C.
8	(England)	George Sage	IR (OF/IL)	1		4		15	1	20	1	1895	Old Castle Swifts F.C. & Thames Ironworks Employee
9	(England)	Charlie Dove	CF (IR/OR/CH)					18	6	18	6	1895	Thames Ironworks Employee & South West Ham
10	(England)	George Gresham	IL (OF/IR/LH)					22	10	22	10	1895	Gainsborough Trinity F.C.
11	(England)	William Chapman	OL (OR/IF/CH)			4		22	6	26	6	1895	St Luke's
Other players with appearances
5	(England)	A. Williams	CH (FB)	1		3		8		12		1895	Dartford
3	(England)	Barnabas French	LB (WH/CH)	1		4		4		9		1895	Thames Ironworks Employee
10	(England)	Billy Barnes (Note: Joined South West Ham half-way through the season and played in the West Ham Charity Cup final games as a guest.)	IL (OF)			3	1	5		8	1	1895	
4	(England)	Gillies	RH (LH)					8		8		1895	
1	(England)	Gibson	GK					7		7		1895	
9	(Scotland)	Jamie Lindsay	CF (FB/IR)	1		2		3		6		1895	Old Castle Swifts F.C. & Thames Ironworks Employee
6	(England)	Colin Stares	LH (RH/IR)					6		6		1895	
10	(England)	Johnny Stewart	IL (RH/OL)	1		4	1			5	1	1895	Old Castle Swifts F.C. & Thames Ironworks Employee
9	(England)	J. Fitzjohn	CF (OR/IR)					5	1	5	1	1895	
7	(England)	H. Rossiter	OR (IR/CF)					4	2	4	2	1895	
10	(England)	Thomas Freeman	IL (OL/CF)	1		1		2		4		1895	Thames Ironworks Employee
6	(England)	William Hickman	RH			4				4		1895	Old Castle Swifts F.C.
2	(England)	Catling	RB (LB)					3		3		1895	
6	(England)	Hilton	LH (RH)					3		3		1895	
7/11	(England)	Farrell	OF					2	1	2	1	1895	
10/11	(England)	Albert Nichols	IL/OL					2	1	2	1	1895	
2	(England)	Henry Tull	RB	1		1				2		1895	Thames Ironworks Employee
7	(England)	Fred Chamberlain	OR			2				2		1895	Thames Ironworks Employee
9/10	(England)	McArthur	CF/IL					2		2		1895	
2/3	(England)	George Neil (Note: Played for the club while registered to West Norwood.)	FB					2		2		1895	
11	(England)	Arthur Darby	OL	1						1		1895	Thames Ironworks Employee
6	(Scotland)	Walter Parks	LH	1						1		1895	Old Castle Swifts F.C. & Thames Ironworks Employee
1	(England)	John Watson	GK	1						1		1895	Thames Ironworks Employee
10	(England)	G. Patterson (Note: Member of the Thames Ironworks committee.)	IL					1		1		1895	Thames Ironworks Employee
8	(England)	C. Rossiter	IR					1		1		1895	
1	(England)	Woodford	GK					1		1		1895	
8	(England)	A. N. Other	IR					1		1		1895	
		Untraced				11	1	175	95	186	96		
		Own Goals					1		1		2		
		TOTAL		11		55	7	451	131	517	138		
Other known players
	(Scotland)	Sam Hay	F									1895	Victoria
	(England)	Frank McCulloch	F									1895	Old Castle Swifts F.C.

== Bibliography ==
- Belton, Brian (2006). West Ham United Miscellany. Pennant Books. ISBN 0-9550394-4-4.
- Blows, Kirk; Hogg, Tony (2000). The Essential History of West Ham United. Headline. ISBN 0-7472-7036-8.
- Powles, John (2005). Iron in the Blood. Nottingham: Soccerdata. ISBN 1-899468-22-6. Archived from the original on 12 January 2018.
