= List of West Ham United F.C. records and statistics =

This article lists records and statistics associated with West Ham United.

== Team records ==
=== Scoring records ===
- Biggest victory: 10–0 v Bury, Football League Cup (25 October 1983)
- Biggest league win: 8–0 v Rotherham United (8 March 1958), and v Sunderland (19 October 1968)
- Biggest defeat: 0–7 v Barnsley (1 September 1919), v Everton (22 October 1927), and v Sheffield Wednesday (28 November 1959)

=== League sequences ===
- Wins: 9 (19 October to 4 December 1985)
- Draws: 5 (7 September to 5 October 1968, and 15 October to 1 November 2003)
- Defeats: 9 (28 March to 29 August 1932)

(source:)

== Goalscorers ==
=== Leading first class goalscorers ===
Rank	Nat.	Player	West Ham Career	Total Goals
1	(England)	Vic Watson	1920–1935	326
2	(England)	Geoff Hurst	1959–1972	252
3	(Scotland)	John Dick	1953–1962	166
3	(England)	Jimmy Ruffell	1921–1937	166
5	(England)	Tony Cottee	1983–1988; 1994–1996	146
6	(England)	Johnny Byrne	1961–1967	107
7	(England)	Pop Robson	1970–1974; 1976–1979	104
8	(England)	Trevor Brooking	1967–1984	102
9	(England)	Malcolm Musgrove	1953–1963	100
9	(England)	Martin Peters	1962–1970	100

=== Other top goalscorers ===
Rank	Nat.	Player	West Ham Career	First Class Goals	Sth. League Goals	War-time Goals	Total Goals
1	(England)	George Foreman	1939–1946	1		187	188
2	(England)	Danny Shea	1908–1913; 1920–1921	1	121	64	186
3	(Scotland)	Billy Grassam	1900–1903; 1906–1909		68		68
4	(England)	Dick Leafe	1913–1922	7	37		44
5	(England)	Harry Stapley	1905–1908		41		41
6	(England)	Herbert Ashton	1908–1918		25	11	36
7	(England)	George Hilsdon	1904–1905; 1912–1915		35		35
8	(England)	George Webb	1908–1912		32		32
9	(England)	Fred Blackburn	1905–1913		28		28
9	(England)	Richard Dunn	1939–1948	2		26	28

=== Top goalscorers by season ===
For a list of top scorers by season see List of West Ham United F.C. seasons.

== Penalty shoot-outs ==
=== Competitive ===
Season	Date	Competition	Round	Opponent	Venue	Result	Score	Ref
2022–23	9 November 2022	EFL Cup	Third Round	Blackburn Rovers	H	Lost	9–10	
2021–22	27 October 2021	EFL Cup	Fourth Round	Man City	H	Won	5–3	
2015–16	23 July 2015	UEFA Europa League	Second Qualifying Round	Birkirkara	A	Won	5–3	
2014–15	13 January 2015	FA Cup	Third Round replay	Everton	H	Won	9–8	
2014–15	26 August 2014	Football League Cup	Third Round	Sheffield United	H	Lost	5–4	
2005–06	13 May 2006	FA Cup	Final	Liverpool	N	Lost	1–3	
2004–05	13 February 2005	FA Cup	Fourth Round replay	Sheffield United	A	Lost	1–3	
2002–03	1 October 2002	Football League Cup	Second Round	Chesterfield	A	Won	5–4	
2001–02	11 September 2001	Football League Cup	Second Round	Reading	A	Lost	5–6	
1997–98	17 March 1998	FA Cup	Sixth Round replay	Arsenal	H	Lost	3–4	
1997–98	25 February 1998	FA Cup	Fifth Round	Blackburn Rovers	A	Won	5–4	
1988–89	22 November 1988	Full Members Cup	Second Round	Watford	A	Lost	1–3	
1973–74	11 August 1973	Watney Cup	First Round	Bristol Rovers	A	Lost	5–6	

=== Friendly ===
Season	Date	Competition	Round	Opponent	Venue	Result	Score	Ref
2025–26	9 August 2025	BoyleSports Cup	Final	Lille	H	Won	5–4	
2024–25	10 August 2024	Betway Cup	Final	Celta Vigo	H	Won	6–5	
2019–20	3 August 2019	Betway Cup	Final	Athletic Bilbao	H	Lost	2–4	
2018–19	31 July 2018	Betway Cup	Final	Mainz 05	N	Won	7–6	
2014–15	2 August 2014	Schalke 04 Cup	Group Stage	Schalke 04	A	Won	7–6	
2010–11	7 August 2010	SBOBET Cup	Final	Deportivo La Coruña	H	Won	5–3	

== Honours ==
source;

=== European ===
- UEFA Cup Winners' Cup
  - Winners: 1964–65
  - Runners-up: 1975–76
- UEFA Europa Conference League
  - Winners: 2022–23
- UEFA Intertoto Cup
  - Winners: 1999
- Anglo-Italian League Cup
  - Runners-up: 1975

=== Domestic ===
==== Leagues ====
- First Division/Premier League (Tier 1)
  - Highest placing: 3rd, 1985–86
- Second Division/Championship (Tier 2)
  - Champions (2): 1957–58, 1980–81
  - Runners-up: 1922–23, 1990–91, 1992–93
  - Play-off winners: 2005, 2012
  - Play-off runners-up: 2004

==== Cups ====
- FA Cup
  - Winners (3): 1963–64, 1974–75, 1979–80
  - Runners-up: 1922–23, 2005–06
- EFL Cup/Football League Cup
  - Runners-up: 1965–66, 1980–81
- FA Community/Charity Shield
  - Winners: 1964 (shared)
  - Runners-up: 1975, 1980
- Football League War Cup
  - Winners: 1939–40

==== Other ====
- Southern League Division One:
  - Highest placing: 3rd, 1912–13
- Southern League Division Two
  - Champions: 1898–99
- Western League:
  - Champions: 1906–07
- London League:
  - Champions (2): 1897–98, 1901–02
  - Runners-up: 1896–97, 1902–03
- Southern Floodlit Cup:
  - Winners: 1956
  - Runners-up: 1960
- London Challenge Cup
  - Winners (9): 1925, 1926, 1930, 1947, 1949, 1953, 1957, 1968, 1969
- Essex Professional Cup:
  - Winners (3): 1951, 1955 (shared), 1959
  - Runners-up: 1952, 1958
- Southern Charity Cup
  - Runners-up: 1902
- West Ham Charity Cup
  - Winners: 1896
  - Runners-up: 1897
- Norfolk & Norwich Hospital Cup
  - Winners: 1924
  - Runners-up: 1925

==== Wartime ====
- London Combination:
  - Champions: 1916–17
  - Runners-up: 1915–16 (Supplementary Tournament), 1917–18
- Regional League South:
  - Runners-up: 1939–40, 1940–41
- London League:
  - Runners-up: 1943–44, 1944–45

==== Indoor ====
- London Fives
  - Winners: 1967, 1970, 1984
  - Runners-up: 1955, 1957, 1960, 1971, 1974, 1977, 1981

=== International ===
- International Soccer League
  - Winners: 1963
- American Challenge Cup
  - Runners-up: 1963

=== Friendly ===
- Bobby Moore Cup:
  - Winners: 2008
- SBOBET Cup:
  - Winners: 2010
- Ciutat de Barcelona Trophy:
  - Winners: 2013
- Betway Cup:
  - Winners: 2018, 2021

=== Other awards ===
- BBC Sports Personality of the Year Team Award: 1965
- Honorary Degree (awarded to the club) in 2009 by the University of East London
