= David Furnell =

English footballer

Dave Furnell
Personal information
- Full name: David Furnell
- Date of birth: June 1874
- Place of birth: West Ham, England
- Date of death: Unknown
- Position: Goalkeeper

Senior career*
Years	Team	Apps	(Gls)
1892–1894	Old St. Luke's		
1894–1895	Old Castle Swifts		
1895–1897	St Luke's		
1897–1898	Thames Ironworks	11	(0)
1898–?	Hammersmith Athletic		
- * Club domestic league appearances and goals

David Furnell (born June 1874) was an English footballer who played as a goalkeeper.

Furnell originally played for Old St Luke's either as a full back or half back before being converted to a goalkeeper. In 1894 the club merged with Castle Swifts F.C. to form Old Castle Swifts and Furnell remained there until they folded in 1895. He then spent a season and a half captaining St Luke's from Beckton before they also folded.

It was towards the end of the 1896–97 season that Furnell, who was already a labourer at the shipbuilding company joined Thames Ironworks, making his debut in the final London League game of the season, a 1–1 draw against Barking Woodville.

He became first choice keeper for the club during the 1897–98 season and helped them win the London League and promotion to the Southern League by keeping clean sheets in five of his ten games. By November 1897 his form was good enough to earn him recognition at a county level when he was selected to play for Essex against Middlesex, a game that Middlesex won 5–2. During that season he also played in all three of the club's FA Cup games, two games in the London Senior Cup, as well as at least ten friendlies, the last of which he played at left-half. In all, he played a minimum of 26 games for Thames Ironworks.

He moved on to Hammersmith Athletic in 1898–99.

== See also ==
- 1896–97 Thames Ironworks F.C. season
- 1897–98 Thames Ironworks F.C. season

== Notes ==
- In earlier Thames Ironworks and West Ham publications this player has been confused with George Fundell, a forward who also played for Old St. Luke's. He is, however, listed as David Furnell in Who's Who of West Ham United by Tony Hogg (2005, ISBN 1-903135-50-8) as well as in Iron in the Blood by John Powles (2005, ISBN 1-899468-22-6)
