= John T. Wood =

John T. Wood may refer to:

- John Taylor Wood (1830–1904), U.S. Navy, Confederate Navy
- John Travers Wood (1878–1954), U.S. Representative from Idaho
- John Turtle Wood (1821–1890), British architect, engineer, and archaeologist

== See also ==
- John Thomas Archer Wood (c. 1872–1954), English footballer
