= Old Castle Swifts F.C. =

Old Castle Swifts
- Full name: Old Castle Swifts Football Club
- Nickname: The Swifts
- Founded: 1892 as Castle Swifts F.C.
- Dissolved: 1895
- Ground: Dunottar Park 1892; Temple Meadows 1892–1894; Hermit Road 1894–1895
- Capacity: 1,000
- Chairman: Donald Currie
Home colours

Old Castle Swifts Football Club, the first professional football club in Essex, was formed by Scottish shipowner Donald Currie in September 1892 as Castle Swifts Football Club. The club's first home ground, located in West Ham, was named Dunottar Park, after the Castle Line company's ship Dunottar Castle. In 1894, Old Castle Swifts merged with Old St Luke's and was renamed. The club was wound up the following season. Its demise saw several players join the newly founded Thames Ironworks, the club that was later reformed as West Ham United.

== History ==
=== Formation ===
Old Castle Swifts Football Club was formed by Scottish shipowner Donald Currie in September 1892 as Castle Swifts Football Club. They were the works team of the ship repair yard of The Castle Shipping Line and initially the majority of the team were drawn from the mainly Scottish workforce, paid for the games they played.

Castles Swifts' first home ground, a field located opposite the West Ham Police Station in West Ham Lane, was called Dunottar Park, after the Castle Line's ship Dunottar Castle. The ground had perimeter fencing and admission was charged at 3d.

=== 1892–1893 ===
Castle Swifts did not remain long at Dunottar Park, having to find a new ground after a dispute with the landlord. One was soon located in fields beside Wakefield Street in East Ham, known as Temple Meadows, which lay in the grounds of Temple House, not far from East Ham railway station. The team would change into their kit in the nearby Denmark Inn (now the Denmark Arms), located on the Barking Road. The Denmark Arms would later be used by many West Ham United fans before matches at the Boleyn Ground.

In March 1893 they faced Barking Woodville in the final of the West Ham Charity Cup, held at Clapton's Spotted Dog ground. The Swifts were two goals down before coming back to win the tie 4–2, with the goals coming from outside-right Grundy, inside forwards Mitchell and Taylor and an own goal. A local newspaper made the following account of the final:

"After the match the crowd made a rush to the Grand Stand where the Mayor presented the large silver cup to the captain of the Castle Swifts and Mr. Comerford of the Cup Committee announced that 'the medals had not yet come to hand, but they would be forwarded to the winners as soon as possible'. With that the captain was lifted on to the shoulders of several of his followers and carried from the ground."

=== 1893–1894 ===
At the end of the 1893–94 season, the team merged with Old St Luke's, and the newly formed team was renamed as Old Castle Swifts, and used Old St Luke's ground in Hermit Road, Canning Town. Hermit Road had been described as a 'cinder heap' and 'barren waste'. It was surrounded by a moat and had canvas sheeting for fencing.

=== 1894–1895 ===
The Swifts officially became a professional outfit in November 1894, a move made after one of their players, Cunningham, was denied a return to amateur status. The club resigned from the London FA as a result.

Their demise came at the end of March 1895 when the club became bankrupt. Following this, the club played one further game, a pre-arranged fixture against St Luke's on 16 April, under the name of Old St Luke's.

=== Thames Ironworks ===
Arnold Hills, the Chairman of Thames Ironworks and Shipbuilding Co. Ltd, saw the opportunity to fund a works side, so provided the money, in order that he may take over the tenancy of the Hermit Road ground, and Thames Ironworks was born. For the Ironworks' initial season of 1895–96, a number of Old Castle Swifts players were absorbed into the newly formed team. Among them were half-backs William Morton, Walter Parks and John Woods, forwards Jamie Lindsay and George Sage, and full-back Robert Stevenson, who became the Ironworks' first ever captain. Goalkeeper David Furnell would also eventually join Thames Ironworks in 1897. The club later became West Ham United. The light blue shirts, white shorts and scarlet socks that were worn by Thames Ironworks from the 1897–98 season, and also by the early West Ham United team, are thought to have originated with Old Castle Swifts.

== Honours ==
- West Ham Charity Cup Winners 1892–93

== Players ==
Player	Position	Apps	Gls	Date signed	Previous club
Castle Swifts' 1892–93 West Ham Charity Cup-winning team
Lewis	GK	1+		1892
A. McFarlane	RB	1+		1892	Upton Park
Benbow	LB	1+		1892
Leith	RH	1+		1892
W. McFarlane	CH	1+		1892	Upton Park
Baird	LH	1+		1892
Murray	RW	1+		1892
Mitchell	IR	1+	1	1892
Fraser	CF	1+		1892
Taylor	IL	1+	1	1892
Grundy	LW	1+	1	1892
Other known players
H. Butterworth	CF	0+		1894	Old St. Luke's F.C.
Cooper		0+		1894
Craig	HB	0+		?
Cunningham		0+		1894	Millwall Athletic
David Furnell	GK	0+		1894	Old St. Luke's F.C.
William Hickman	LH	0+		1893	Old St. Luke's F.C.
Jamie Lindsay	FB/FW	0+		1894	Millwall Athletic
McLachlan (Note: McLachlan, Thompson and Tyler are known to have played in a friendly against Swindon Town on 16 March 1895.)	GK	0+		?
Frank McCulloch	FW	0+		1894	Millwall Athletic
John Morrison	I/OL	0+		1894	Old St. Luke's F.C.
William Morton	RH	0+		1894
Walter Parks	LH	0+		1893	Old St. Luke's F.C.
George Sage	IR	0+		1894	Old St. Luke's F.C.
Robert Stevenson	RB	0+		1895	Woolwich Arsenal
Johnny Stewart	HB/FW	0+		1894	Old St. Luke's F.C.
Thompson		0+		?
Tyler		0+		?
Willing		0+		1894	Millwall Athletic
John Thomas Archer Woods	WH/OR	0+		1893	Old St. Luke's F.C.
