= Johnny Stewart =

Johnny Stewart may refer to:

- Jonny Stewart (born 1990), Scottish footballer
- Johnny Stewart (footballer, born 1872) (1872–?), English footballer
- Johnny Stewart (rugby union) (born 1998), Irish rugby union player

== See also ==
- John Stewart (disambiguation)
