= Denmark Arms =

Pub in East Ham, London, England

The Denmark Arms
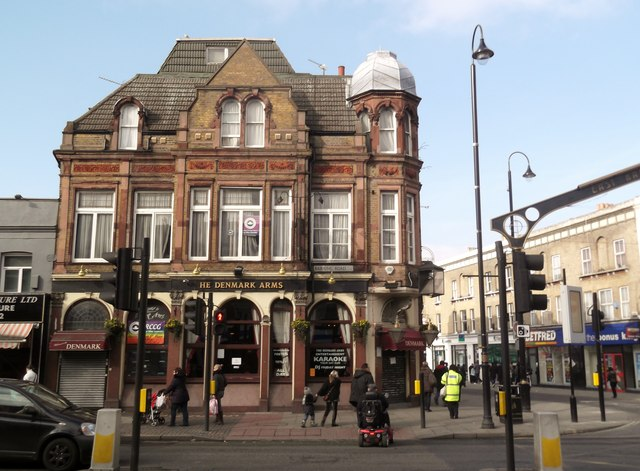

- Location within London Borough of Newham Location within Greater London

General information
- Location: 381 Barking Road, East Ham, London, England
- Coordinates: 51°31′59″N 0°03′14″E
- Construction started: 1890

Design and construction
- Designations

Listed Building – Grade II
- Official name: Denmark Arms Public House
- Designated: 20 July 1998
- Reference no.: 1375684

The Denmark Arms is a Grade II listed public house at 381 Barking Road, East Ham, London.

It was built in about 1890, and extended about 1900. It was formerly named the Denmark Inn.

In the 1890s, local football club Old Castle Swifts would use the Denmark Inn to change for matches at Temple Meadows in Wakefield Street. Much later, West Ham United fans would use the pub for pre-match drinks before attending games at the nearby Boleyn Ground.

The Denmark Arms closed on 30 July 2018.

In September 2018, the building was purchased by the Antic Collective company, and the Denmark Arms reopened on 15 November 2018, with plans announced to hold a pantomime and future theatre events in the pub's function room.
