= George Sage (footballer) =

English footballer (born c. 1872)

Personal information
- Date of birth: Q4 1872
- Place of birth: Woolwich, England
- Positions: Outside forward; inside forward

Senior career*
Years	Team	Apps	(Gls)
1892–1894	Old St Luke's		
1894–1895	Old Castle Swifts		
1895–1896	Thames Ironworks		
- * Club domestic league appearances and goals

George Sage (born c. December 1872) was an English footballer who played as an outside or inside forward. He was amongst the first players of Thames Ironworks, the club that would later be reformed as West Ham United.

Sage was born in Woolwich, London and lived in East Ham. He was employed as a boilermaker for Thames Ironworks and Shipbuilding Company and was well known on the local football scene. His first club, in the 1892–93 season, was Old St Luke's. Sage then played for Old Castle Swifts, which had merged with Old St. Lukes for the 1894–95 season and taken over their ground in Hermit Road, Canning Town. Swifts themselves collapsed as an entity in 1895 and Sage's contract was picked up by Thames Ironworks.

Sage could play in any forward position. He is likely to have played in Thames Ironworks' first ever game, against Royal Ordnance, and was a regular during the first half of the 1895–96 season. He played at least 20 games for the Irons that season and featured in five of the 'floodlit friendly' games that experimented with artificial lighting at Hermit Road, including the December clash against Old St Stephans. He was also part of the Thames Ironworks team that lost their first ever competitive fixture, a 5–0 defeat against Chatham Town in the FA Cup on 12 October 1895. Sage won the West Ham Charity Cup with the club in 1896, with Ironworks beating Barking 1–0 in the final played in Beckton.

The 1896–97 season saw Sage's appearances limited to just six games. Two of these were friendlies and a game each in the London League, the London Senior Cup, the Essex Senior Cup and the South Essex League. Sage's London League appearance, on 22 October 1896, had seen him score Ironworks only goal in a 4–1 defeat by 3rd Grenadier Guards.
