= Robert Stevenson (footballer, born 1869) =

Scottish footballer

Bob Stevenson

Personal information
- Full name: Robert Stevenson
- Date of birth: 10 May 1869
- Place of birth: Barrhead, Scotland
- Position: Right-half

Senior career*
Years	Team	Apps	(Gls)
1892–1894	Third Lanark	25	(2)
1894–1895	Woolwich Arsenal	7	(0)
1895	Old Castle Swifts		
1895–1897	Thames Ironworks		
1897–?	Arthurlie		
- * Club domestic league appearances and goals

Robert Stevenson (born 10 May 1869) was a Scottish footballer, a versatile full and half back who could also play at centre forward. He was the first captain of Thames Ironworks, who were later reformed as West Ham United.

== Career ==
Born in Barrhead, Scotland, Stevenson first played for Third Lanark in 1892–93, before joining Woolwich Arsenal in May 1894. He spent a single season with the Gunners, playing at half-back for the first seven Second Division matches of the 1894–95 season. Stevenson also briefly captained the club. In March 1895, Stevenson was allowed to join up with Old Castle Swifts, but they soon folded and he returned to Scotland.

On his return to England, Stevenson was called up to play for the newly established Thames Ironworks team for the 1895–96 season. His return to Hermit Road saw him instantly installed as their first ever club captain and went on to play for the Irons for a season and a half, covering full-back and centre-forward roles as well as his usual position of half-back.

Robert Stevenson, a full back of merit, who captained the Arsenal team in their early Second Division struggles, was among those who helped to build warships when the suggestion of a football club was made at the Thames Iron Works, and he was the first captain of the team. There was not much of him in the way of physique, but he was a wonderfully good player and invaluable as an advisor to the fathers of the club.

— Dickford and Gibson (1905), Association Football and the Men Who Made It.

The first season saw Stevenson score at least 8 goals in 20 games and gain a winner's medal in the West Ham Charity Cup. In February 1897, after 16 appearances and 5 goals in the Irons' second campaign of 1896–97, Stevenson left the club. He once again returned to Scotland and joined Arthurlie.
