= John Thomas Archer Wood =

English footballer

John Thomas Archer Wood (c. 1872 – 1954) was an English footballer who played right wing for Old Castle Swifts before joining Thames Ironworks, the team that became West Ham United, in their very first season of 1895–96. Woods is featured in Thames Ironworks' very first team photograph in 1895. John Woods was also the cousin of champion jockey Fred Archer.

Wood was born in Canning Town around 1872 to James William Wood and Ann Archer and baptised in June 1875.
