= Jamie Lindsay (footballer, born 1870) =

Scottish footballer

James Lindsay (born c. 1870) was a footballer who played at inside-forward or centre-forward.

Lindsay played for East Ham side Anchor and turned out for Millwall during 1893–94. He played for Old Castle Swifts until 1895, before transferring to the newly formed Thames Ironworks for the 1895–96 season. He played in a number of games for the club, probably including their first ever fixture against Royal Ordnance. He played in the club's first FA Cup game, against Chatham Town on 12 October 1895. He also played for the Ironworks in the final of the West Ham Charity Cup that season, although by this point he had moved to South West Ham and played as a guest.
