= West Ham United F.C. =

Association football club in England

West Ham United
- Full name: West Ham United Football Club
- Nicknames: The Irons; The Hammers
- Short name: West Ham
- Founded: 29 June 1895; 131 years ago, as Thames Ironworks; 5 July 1900; 126 years ago, as West Ham United
- Ground: London Stadium
- Capacity: 62,500
- Owner(s): Daniel Křetínský (43%); David Sullivan (38.8%); Vanessa Gold (9%); J. Albert "Tripp" Smith (8%); Other investors (1.1%)
- Chairwoman: Vanessa Gold
- Head coach: Scott Parker
- League: EFL Championship
- 2025–26: Premier League, 18th of 20 (relegated)
- Website: whufc.com
Home colours	Away colours	Third colours

West Ham United Football Club is a professional football club based in Stratford, East London, England. The club compete in the EFL Championship in the 2026–27 season. The club plays at the London Stadium, having moved from their former home, the Boleyn Ground, in 2016.

West Ham United was founded in 1895 as Thames Ironworks and reformed in 1900 as West Ham United. It moved to the Boleyn Ground, which remained its home ground for more than a century, in 1904. The team initially competed in the Southern League and Western League before joining the Football League in 1919. It was promoted to the top flight in 1923, when it was also losing finalist in the first FA Cup final held at Wembley. In 1940, the club won the inaugural Football League War Cup.

West Ham United has won five major honours in its history. Domestically, it has been winner of the FA Cup three times (1964, 1975 and 1980) and runner-up twice (1923 and 2006). In European competitions, the club has reached three major European finals winning the European Cup Winners' Cup in 1965, finishing runner-up in the same competitions in 1976, and winning the second edition of the Conference League in 2023. The club has also won one minor European trophy by winning the Intertoto Cup in 1999. West Ham United is one of eight clubs never to have fallen below the second tier of English football, spending 68 of 100 league seasons in the top flight, up to and including the 2025–26 season. The club's highest league position to date came in 1985–86, when it achieved third place in the then First Division.

Three West Ham players were members of the 1966 World Cup finals-winning England team: captain Bobby Moore and goalscorers Geoff Hurst and Martin Peters. The club has a long-standing rivalry with Millwall, and the fixture has gained notoriety for frequent incidents of football hooliganism. West Ham adopted their claret, sky blue and white colour scheme in the early 1900s, with the most common iteration of a claret shirt and sky blue sleeves first emerging in 1904.

== History ==
=== Origins ===
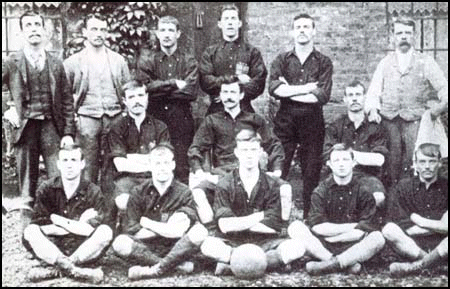
Earliest club shot, during its founding year as Thames Ironworks in 1895

The earliest generally accepted incarnation of West Ham United was founded in 1895 as Thames Ironworks F.C., the works team of the largest and last surviving shipbuilder on the Thames, Thames Ironworks and Shipbuilding Company, by foreman and local league referee Dave Taylor and owner Arnold Hills and was announced in the Thames Ironworks Gazette of June 1895. Thames Ironworks was based in Leamouth Wharf in Blackwall and Canning Town on both banks of the River Lea, where the Lea meets the Thames. Thames Ironworks built many ships and other structures, the most famous being HMS Warrior. The last ship built there was the dreadnought HMS Thunderer in 1912 and the yard shut soon after.

The repair yard of the Castle Shipping Line was a very near neighbour and their work team, initially known as the Castle Swifts, would informally merge with the Thames Ironworks own team. The team played on a strictly amateur basis for 1895 at least, with a team featuring a number of works employees. Thomas Freeman was a ships fireman and Walter Parks, a clerk. Johnny Stewart, Walter Tranter and James Lindsay were all boilermakers. Other employees included William Chapman, George Sage and Fred Chamberlain, as well as apprentice riveter Charlie Dove, who was to have a great influence on the club's future at a later date.

Thames Ironworks won the West Ham Charity Cup, contested by clubs in the West Ham locality, in 1895, then won the London League in 1897. They turned professional in 1898 upon entering the Southern League Second Division, and were promoted to the First Division at the first attempt. The following year they came second from bottom, but had established themselves as a fully-fledged competitive team. They comfortably fended off the challenge of local rivals Fulham in a relegation play-off, 5–1 in late April 1900 and retained their First Division status.

Following growing disputes over the running and financing of the club, in June 1900 Thames Ironworks F.C. was disbanded, then almost immediately relaunched as West Ham United F.C. – reflecting the West Ham, London district where they played – on 5 July 1900 with Syd King as their manager and future manager Charlie Paynter as his assistant. Because of the original "works team" roots and links (still represented upon the club badge), they are still known as "the Irons" or "the Hammers" amongst fans and the media.

=== Birth of West Ham United (1901–1961) ===
West Ham United joined the Western League for the 1901 season while also continuing to play in the Southern Division 1. In 1907, West Ham were crowned the Western League Division 1B Champions, and then defeated 1A champions Fulham 1–0 to become the Western League Overall Champions. The reborn club continued to play their games at the Memorial Grounds in Plaistow (funded by Arnold Hills) but moved to a pitch in the Upton Park area in the guise of the Boleyn Ground stadium in 1904. West Ham's first game in their new home was against fierce rivals Millwall (themselves an Ironworks team, albeit for a rival company) drawing a crowd of 10,000 and with West Ham running out 3–0 winners, and as the Daily Mirror wrote on 2 September 1904, "Favoured by the weather turning fine after heavy rains of the morning, West Ham United began their season most auspiciously yesterday evening; when they beat Millwall by 3 goals to 0 on their new enclosure at Upton Park."

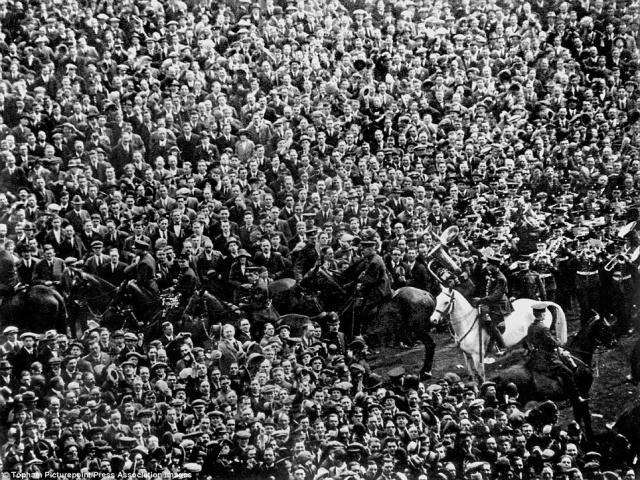
Billie the White Horse, saviour of the 1923 FA Cup final

In 1919, still under King's leadership, West Ham gained entrance to the Football League Second Division, their first game being a 1–1 draw with Lincoln City, and were promoted to the First Division in 1923, also making it to the first ever FA Cup final to be held at the old Wembley Stadium. Their opponents were Bolton Wanderers. This was also known as the "White Horse final", where nearly 300,000 people (according to Police estimates) came to see the match. Overcrowding led to the crowd spilling out on to the pitch, which had to be cleared prior to kick-off by "Billie", a giant white horse (actually grey) being ridden by PC George Scorey. The cup final match itself ended 2–0 to Bolton. The team enjoyed mixed success in the First Division but retained their status for ten years and reached the FA Cup semi-final in 1933.

In 1932, the club was relegated to the Second Division and long-term custodian Syd King was sacked after serving the club in the role of manager for 32 years, and as a player from 1899 to 1903. Following relegation, King had mental health problems. He appeared drunk at a board meeting and killed himself soon after. He was replaced with his assistant manager Charlie Paynter, who himself had been with West Ham in a number of roles since 1897 and who went on to serve the team in this role until 1950 for a total of 480 games. At the start of the 1939–1940 season, the club has assembled a group of players that Charlie Paynter believed was the most talented he'd managed. This included local men brought through the youth team such as Len Goulden, an England regular, and successful signings from the English and Scottish Leagues. There was hope for promotion and a successful new era until war broke out three matches into the season and league football was suspended for six years.

Although league competition was suspended, the War Cup was played in place of the FA Cup for the duration of hostilities. In June 1940 the club won its first major trophy, winning the War Cup by beating first division Blackburn Rovers 1–0 at Wembley Stadium. The club spent most of the next thirty years in the second division, first under Paynter and then later under the leadership of former player Ted Fenton. Fenton succeeded in getting the club promoted back to the top level of English football in 1958. With the considerable input of player Malcolm Allison, Fenton helped develop both the initial batch of future West Ham stars and West Ham's approach to the game.

=== Glory years (1961–1986) ===
Ron Greenwood was appointed as Fenton's successor in 1961 and soon led the club to two major trophies, winning the 1964 FA Cup Final. The team was led by the young Bobby Moore. West Ham also won the European Cup Winners' Cup the following year. During the 1966 World Cup, key members of the tournament winners England were West Ham players, including the captain, Bobby Moore; Martin Peters (who scored in the final); and Geoff Hurst, who scored the first hat-trick in a World Cup final. All three players had come through the youth team at West Ham.

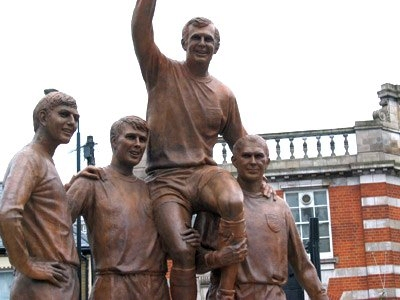
Champions statue on Barking Road

There is a "Champions" statue in Barking Road, opposite The Boleyn Tavern, commemorating West Ham's "three sons" who helped win the 1966 World Cup: Bobby Moore, Geoff Hurst and Martin Peters. Also included on the statue is Everton's Ray Wilson. After a difficult start to the 1974–75 season, Greenwood moved himself "upstairs" to become general manager and, without informing the board, appointed his assistant John Lyall as team manager. The result was instant success – the team scored 20 goals in their first four games and won the FA Cup, becoming the last team to win the FA Cup with an all-English side when they beat Fulham 2–0 in the 1975 final. The Fulham team included two former England captains, Alan Mullery and West Ham legend Bobby Moore. Lyall then guided West Ham to another European Cup Winners' Cup final in 1976, though the team lost the match 4–2 to Belgian side Anderlecht. Greenwood's tenure as general manager lasted less than three years, as he was appointed to manage England in the wake of Don Revie's resignation in 1977.

In 1978, West Ham were again relegated to the Second Division, but Lyall was retained as manager and led the team to victory in the 1980 FA Cup final with a 1–0 win against Arsenal, the most recent time a team from outside the top flight has won the FA Cup. They reached the final by defeating Everton in the semi-final. West Ham were promoted to the First Division in 1981, and finished in the top ten of the First Division for the next three seasons before achieving their highest-ever league finish of third in 1985–86; a group of players which came to be known as The Boys of 86.

=== Ups and downs (1986–2005) ===
However, the Hammers suffered relegation again in 1989, which resulted in Lyall's sacking. He was awarded an ex gratia payment of £100,000 (equivalent to £265,000 in 2025) but left the club in what Lyall described as "upsetting" circumstances, meriting only 73 words in a terse acknowledgement of his service in the club programme. Lyall left West Ham after 34 years' service.

Yearly performance of West Ham since joining the Football League

After Lyall, Lou Macari briefly led the team, though he resigned after less than a single season in order to clear his name of allegations of illegal betting while manager of Swindon Town. He was replaced by former player Billy Bonds. In Bonds' first full season, 1990–91, West Ham again secured promotion to the First Division. Now back in the top flight, Bonds saw West Ham through one of their most controversial seasons. With the club planning to introduce a bond scheme, there was crowd unrest. West Ham finished last and were relegated back to the Second Division after only one season. However, they rebounded strongly in 1992–93. With Trevor Morley and Clive Allen scoring 40 goals, they guaranteed themselves second place on the last day of the season with a 2–0 home win against Cambridge United, and with it promotion to the Premier League.

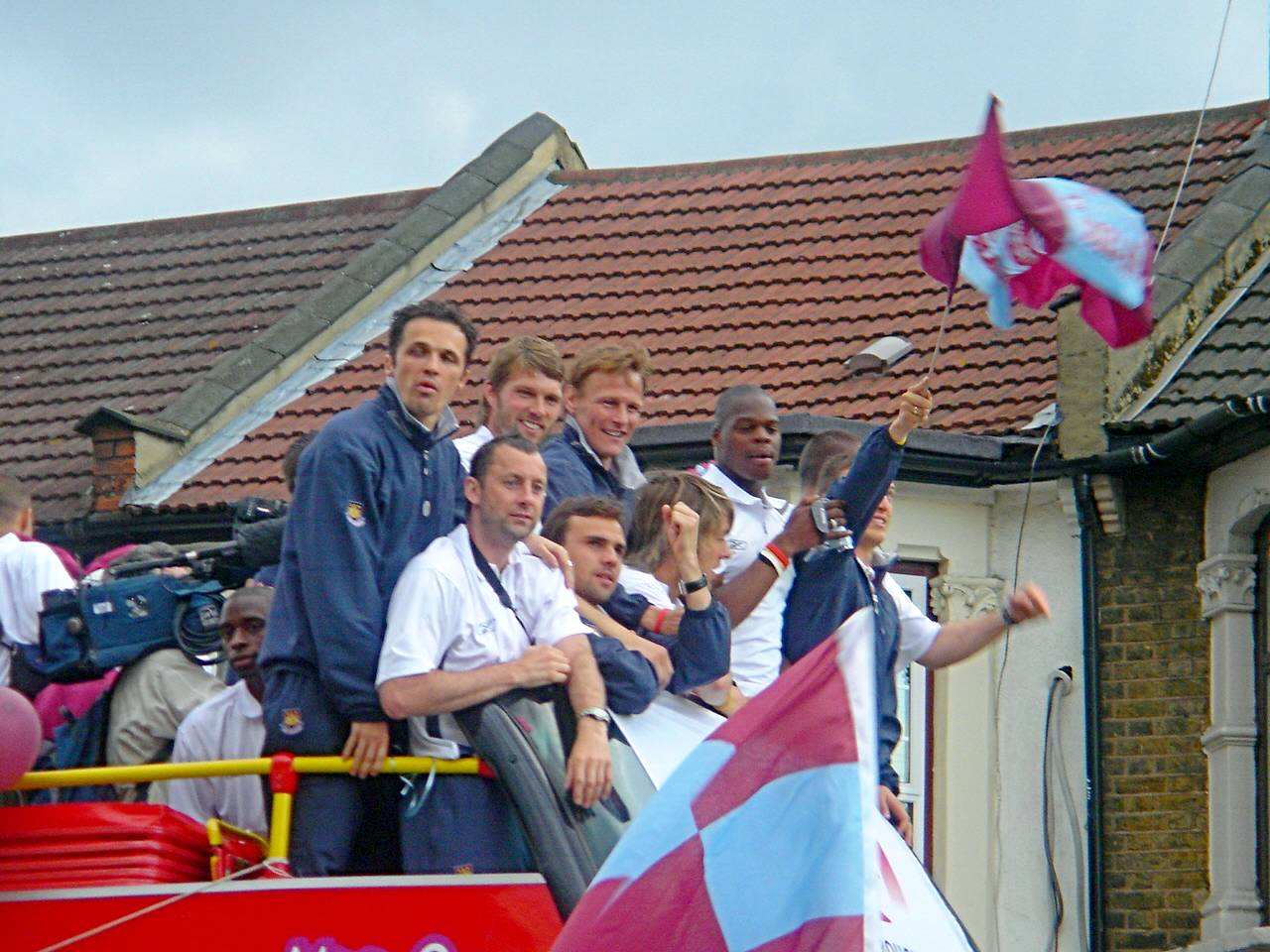
West Ham players on open-top bus near Upton Park celebrate winning the 2005 play-off final in Cardiff. From L-R Shaun Newton (crouching), Back row, Matthew Etherington, Jimmy Walker, Teddy Sheringham, Marlon Harewood, Front row Don Hutchison, Carl Fletcher, Elliott Ward and Mark Noble (with flag).

With the team in the Premier League, there was a need to rebuild the team. Oxford United player Joey Beauchamp was recruited for a fee of £1.2 million (equivalent to £2.6 million in 2025). Shortly after arriving at the club, however, he became unhappy, citing homesickness from his native Oxford as the reason. Bonds in particular found this attitude hard to understand compared to his own committed, never-say-die approach; providing for Bonds' further evidence of the decay in the modern game and modern player. Fifty-eight days later, Beauchamp was signed by Swindon Town for a club-record combined fee of £800,000 (equivalent to £1.7 million in 2025), which included defender Adrian Whitbread going in the opposite direction. Whitbread was valued at £750,000 (equivalent to £1.5 million in 2025) in the deal.

Assistant manager Harry Redknapp was also now taking a bigger role in the transfer of players, with the club's approval. With rumours of his old club AFC Bournemouth being prepared to offer him a position, the West Ham board and their managing director, Peter Storrie, made a controversial move. The board were anxious not to lose Redknapp's services and offered Bonds a place away from the day-to-day affairs of the club on the West Ham board. This would have allowed them to appoint Redknapp as manager. Bonds refused the post offered and walked away from the club. His accusations of deceit and manipulation by the board and by Redknapp have continued to cause ill-feeling. Peter Storrie claimed that they had handled the situation correctly, saying, "If Harry had gone to Bournemouth, there was a good chance Bill would have resigned anyway, so we were in a no-win situation. We're sad that Bill is going, and it's a big blow but it's time to move on and we have appointed a great manager." Redknapp became manager on 10 August 1994.

Redknapp's seven years as manager was notable for the turnover of players during his tenure and for the level of attractive football and success which had not been seen since the managership of John Lyall. Over 134 players passed through the club while he was manager, producing a net transfer fee deficit of £16 million, despite the £18 million sale (equivalent to £34.2 million in 2025) of Rio Ferdinand to Leeds United in 2000. Some were notably successful, such as the signings of Stuart Pearce, Trevor Sinclair, Paolo Di Canio, John Hartson, Eyal Berkovic and Ian Wright. Meanwhile, some were expensive, international players who failed at West Ham, such as Florin Raducioiu; Davor Šuker, who earned as much in wages as the revenue gained from one entire stand and yet made only eight appearances; Christian Bassila, who cost £720,000 (equivalent to £1.4 million in 2025) and played only 86 minutes of football; Titi Camara; Gary Charles, whose wages amounted to £4.4 million (equivalent to £8.2 million in 2025) but made only three starts for the club; Rigobert Song; Paulo Futre; and Marco Boogers, a player often quoted as one of the biggest failures in the Premier League. His first season in charge saw West Ham fighting the threat of relegation until the last few weeks, while his third season would also see another relegation battle. Always willing to enter the transfer market, Redknapp bought in the winter transfer window John Hartson and Paul Kitson, who added the impetus needed at the season's end.

In 1999, West Ham finished fifth, their highest position in the top flight since 1986. They also won the Intertoto Cup beating French club Metz to qualify for the 1999–2000 UEFA Cup. Things began to falter for Redknapp with the sale of Ferdinand to Leeds in November 2000. Redknapp used the transfer money poorly with purchases such as Ragnvald Soma, who cost £800,000 (equivalent to £1.5 million in 2025) and played only seven league games, Camara, and Song. Redknapp felt he needed more funds with which to deal in the transfer market. Chairman Brown lost patience with Redknapp due to his demands for further transfer funds. In June 2001, called to a meeting with Brown expecting to discuss contracts, he was fired. His assistant Frank Lampard left too, making the sale of his son, Frank Lampard Jr., inevitable; in the summer of 2001, he joined Chelsea for £11 million (equivalent to £20.7 million in 2025).

With several names, such as former player Alan Curbishley, now linked with the job, Chairman Brown recruited from within the club, appointing reserve team coach Glenn Roeder as manager on 9 May 2001. He had already failed in management with Gillingham, where he lost 22 of the 35 games he managed, and Watford. His first big signings were the return of Don Hutchison for £5 million (equivalent to £9.4 million in 2025) and Czech centre back Tomáš Řepka. Finishing seventh in his first season Roeder, in his office at Upton Park, suffered a blocked blood vessel in his brain. As Roeder needed medical help and recuperation, former stalwart Trevor Brooking stood in as caretaker manager. Despite not losing another game, the Hammers were relegated on the last day of the season at Birmingham City, with a record high for a relegated club of 42 points from a 38-game season. Ten seasons of top-tier football were over. Many top players, including Joe Cole, Di Canio and Kanouté, all left the club. The next season, now in the second tier, Roeder resumed his stint as manager. Results were still poor, however, and after an away defeat to Rotherham United, he was sacked on 24 August 2003. Brooking again took over as caretaker. He lost only one game, a 2–0 away defeat to Gillingham, and is known as "the best manager West Ham never had".

Former Crystal Palace player and manager of Reading, Alan Pardew was lined up to be the next bench boss. Reading and their chairman, John Madejski, however, were reluctant to let him leave. After serving a period of notice and gardening leave, and with West Ham paying Reading £380,000 (equivalent to £695,000 in 2025) in compensation, he was appointed manager on 18 October 2003, their tenth manager. Pardew set out to rebuild the side bringing in Nigel Reo-Coker, Marlon Harewood and Brian Deane. In his first season in charge, they made the playoff final only to lose to Crystal Palace. His signings of Bobby Zamora, Matthew Etherington and veterans Chris Powell and Teddy Sheringham saw West Ham finishing sixth and subsequently beat Preston North End 1–0 thanks to a Zamora goal in the 2005 playoff final, securing a return to the Premier League. After ensuring promotion, Pardew said, "It's a team effort. We defended well and we're back where we belong."

=== Final years at the Boleyn (2005–2016) ===
On their return to the top division, West Ham finished in ninth place, The highlight of the 2005–06 season, however, was reaching the FA Cup final and taking favourites Liverpool to a penalty shootout after a 3–3 draw. West Ham lost the shootout, but nonetheless gained entry to the following season's UEFA Cup as Liverpool had already qualified for the Champions League. In August 2006, West Ham completed a major coup on the last day of the transfer window after completing the signings of Carlos Tevez and Javier Mascherano. The club was eventually bought by an Icelandic consortium, led by Eggert Magnússon, in November 2006. Manager Alan Pardew was sacked after poor form during the season and was replaced by former Charlton Athletic manager Alan Curbishley.

The signings of Mascherano and Tevez were investigated by the Premier League, who were concerned that details of the transfers had been omitted from official records. The club was found guilty and fined £5.5 million in April 2007. However, West Ham avoided a points deduction which ultimately became critical in their avoidance of relegation at the end of the 2006–07 season. Following on from this event, Wigan Athletic chairman Dave Whelan, supported by other sides facing possible relegation, including Fulham and Sheffield United, threatened legal action. West Ham escaped relegation by winning seven of their last nine games, including a 1–0 win over Arsenal, and on the last day of the season defeated newly crowned League Champions Manchester United 1–0 with a goal by Tevez to finish 15th.

In the 2007–08 season, West Ham remained reasonably consistently in the top half of the league table, with Freddie Ljungberg in the team, despite a slew of injuries; new signing Craig Bellamy missed most of the campaign, while Kieron Dyer was out from August 2007. The last game of the season, at the Boleyn Ground, saw West Ham draw 2–2 against Aston Villa, ensuring a tenth-place finish three points ahead of rivals Tottenham Hotspur. It was a five-place improvement on the previous season, and most importantly West Ham were never under any realistic threat of relegation. After a row with the board over the sale of defenders Anton Ferdinand and George McCartney to Sunderland, manager Alan Curbishley resigned on 3 September 2008. His successor was former Chelsea striker Gianfranco Zola, who took over on 11 September 2008 to become the club's first non-British manager. In the 2008–09 season, West Ham finished ninth, a single place improvement.

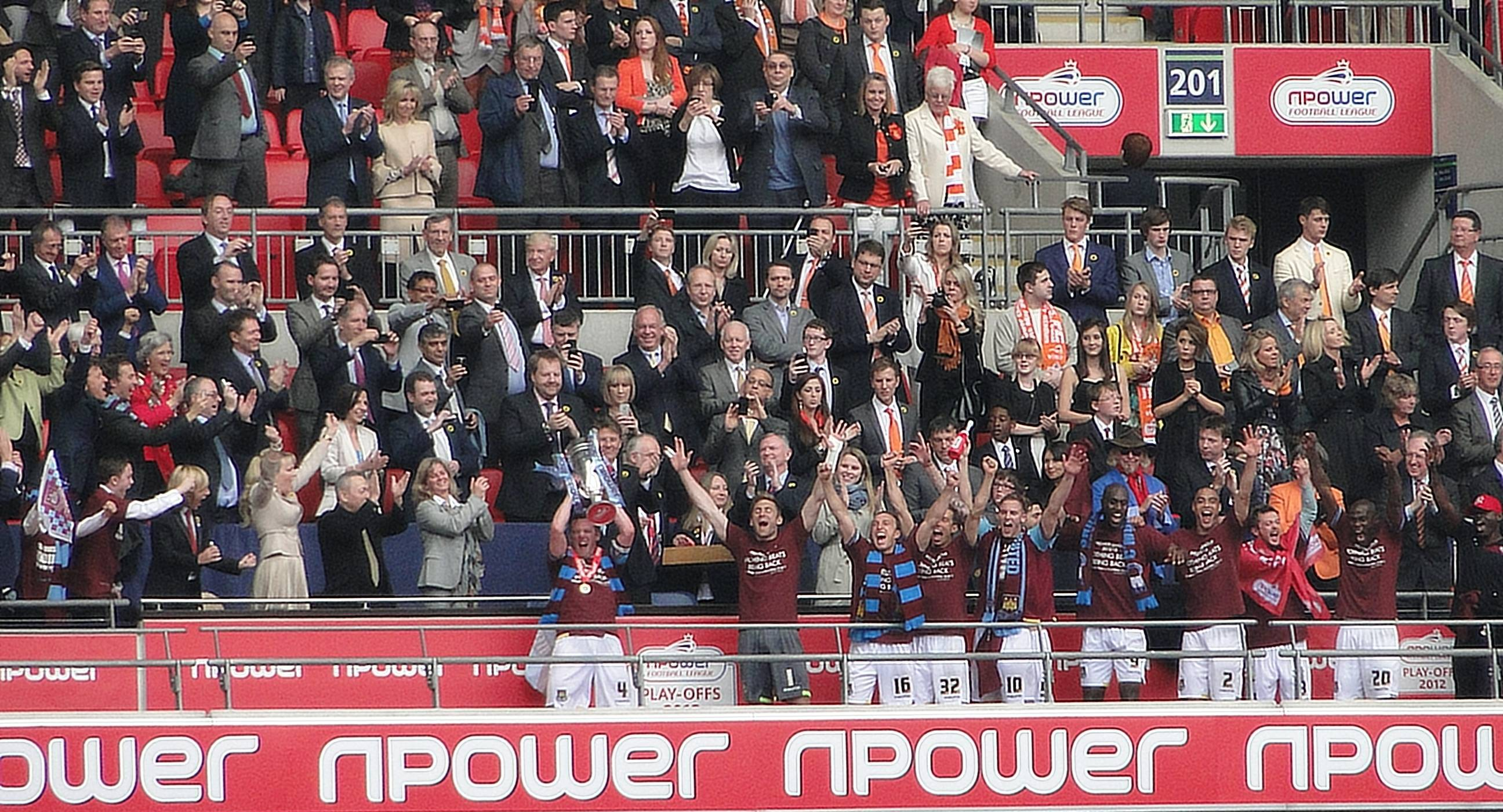
Kevin Nolan lifts the trophy after the 2012 Football League Championship play-off final.

In the 2009–10 season, West Ham started strongly with a 2–0 win over newly promoted Wolverhampton Wanderers, with goals from Mark Noble and newly appointed captain Matthew Upson. A League Cup match against old rivals Millwall brought about violent riots outside the ground as well as pitch invasions and crowd trouble inside Upton Park. In August 2009, the financial concerns of Icelandic owners parent companies left the current owners unable to provide any funds until a new owner was found. The club's shirt sponsor SBOBET provided the club with help to purchase a much needed striker, the Italian Alessandro Diamanti.

West Ham had a poor season which involved a prolonged battle against relegation. They finally secured their survival with two games remaining by defeating Wigan 3–2. The club managed to take 35 points from 38 games, seven fewer than the total they had when relegated seven years prior. On 11 May 2010, two days after the end of the 2009–10 season, West Ham announced the termination of Zola's contract with immediate effect. On 3 June 2010, Avram Grant signed a four-year deal to become the next manager of West Ham subject to a work permit. West Ham's form continued to be poor with the team seldom outside the relegation zone, placing Grant's future as manager under serious doubt. A 4–0 Football League Cup quarter-final win over Manchester United was an otherwise bright spot in a disappointing season. West Ham's form in the Premier League did not affect their form in the two domestic cups. The Hammers reached the semi-final of the League Cup before being eliminated by eventual winners Birmingham City as well as the quarter-final of the FA Cup before a 2–1 defeat at eventual runners-up Stoke City.

On 15 May 2011, West Ham's relegation to the Championship was confirmed after a comeback from Wigan at the DW Stadium. With West Ham leading 2–0 at half-time through two Demba Ba goals, Wigan battled back to win 3–2 thanks to an added-time strike from Charles N'Zogbia. Following the loss, West Ham announced the sacking of manager Avram Grant just one season into his tenure. On 1 June 2011, Sam Allardyce was appointed as manager as Grant's replacement. The club finished third in the 2011–12 Football League Championship with 86 points and took part in the play-offs. They beat Cardiff City in the play-off semi-final 5–0 on aggregate to reach the final against Blackpool at Wembley on 19 May 2012. Carlton Cole opened the scoring, and although Blackpool equalised early in the second half, Ricardo Vaz Tê scored the winner for West Ham in the 87th minute.

West Ham, on their return to the Premier League, signed former players James Collins and George McCartney on permanent deals, as well as record signing Matt Jarvis and Andy Carroll on loan. They won their first game of the season, on 18 August 2012, 1–0 against Aston Villa thanks to a Kevin Nolan goal. The highlight of the first half of the season was a 3–1 home win against reigning European champions Chelsea on 1 December 2012 which saw them in eighth position and 12th at the end of the year. On 22 March 2013, West Ham secured a 99-year lease deal on the Olympic Stadium, with it planned to be used as their home ground from the 2016–17 season. Tenth place was secured at the end of the season with nine home wins and only three away from home. Only 11 away goals were scored, the lowest of the entire league.

In 2013–14, West Ham finished 13th in the Premier League. They also reached the semi-finals of the League Cup before losing 9–0 on aggregate to eventual cup-winners Manchester City. A feature of the season were the criticisms of manager Sam Allardyce by supporters relating to his perceived negative playing tactics. West Ham finished 12th in the 2014–15 Premier League, one place higher than the previous season. Minutes after the last game of the season, on 24 May 2015, the club announced that Allardyce's contract would not be renewed and that they were seeking a new manager. By winning the Premier League Fair Play table for 2014–15, West Ham qualified for the 2015–16 UEFA Europa League, entering at the first qualifying round.

On 9 June 2015, former West Ham player Slaven Bilić was appointed as manager on a three-year contract. In Bilić's fourth game in charge, the team won at Anfield for the first time in 52 years, beating Liverpool 0–3, with goals from Manuel Lanzini, Mark Noble and Diafra Sakho. At the end of the season, West Ham finished 7th in the Premier League. The team broke several records for the club in the Premier League era, including the highest number of points (62), the highest number of goals in a season (65), the fewest games lost in a season (8) and the lowest number of away defeats (5). The season also marked the last season where the team played at the Boleyn Ground, with them moving to the London Stadium from next season – ending their 112-year stay at the stadium.

=== Move to London Stadium and European success (2016–2023) ===
Following Manchester United's win in the 2016 FA Cup final, West Ham took their Europa League place and qualified for the third qualifying round of the 2016–17 edition. At the end of the first season at the London Stadium, the team finished 11th, along with having to deal with the departure of star man Dimitri Payet. However, the team suffered a poor start to the following season, taking only two wins in their opening 11 games. Following a 4–1 defeat to Liverpool at home and with the team threatened by relegation, Bilić was sacked on 6 November 2017. He was replaced by former Sunderland boss David Moyes on a contract until the end of the season. The team battled inconsistent form for the rest of the season but managed to avoid relegation and finish 13th. Moyes was not offered a new contract and left the club on the expiration of it on 16 May 2018.

On 22 May 2018, the club appointed former Manchester City boss Manuel Pellegrini as the new manager on a three-year contract. In his first season in charge, the Hammers finished 10th, once again suffering from inconsistent form. However, after a poor first half to the following season, Pellegrini was sacked in December 2019 with the team only one point above the relegation zone. His last game in charge was a 2–1 home loss to Leicester City. He was replaced by David Moyes, who returned for a second spell in charge a day later.

On 22 July 2020, the club secured their Premier League status for another season, following a 1–1 draw away to Manchester United. Ahead of the 2020–21 season, West Ham's ownership attracted criticism, including from club captain Mark Noble who publicly criticized the sale of academy graduate Grady Diangana. Despite losing the opening two games of the season, West Ham's form improved and by the end of November, the club sat in fifth place. The club would not drop out of a European spot for the rest of the season and went on to qualify for the 2021–22 UEFA Europa League group stages after finishing in 6th. Moyes signed a new three-year contract on 12 June 2021.

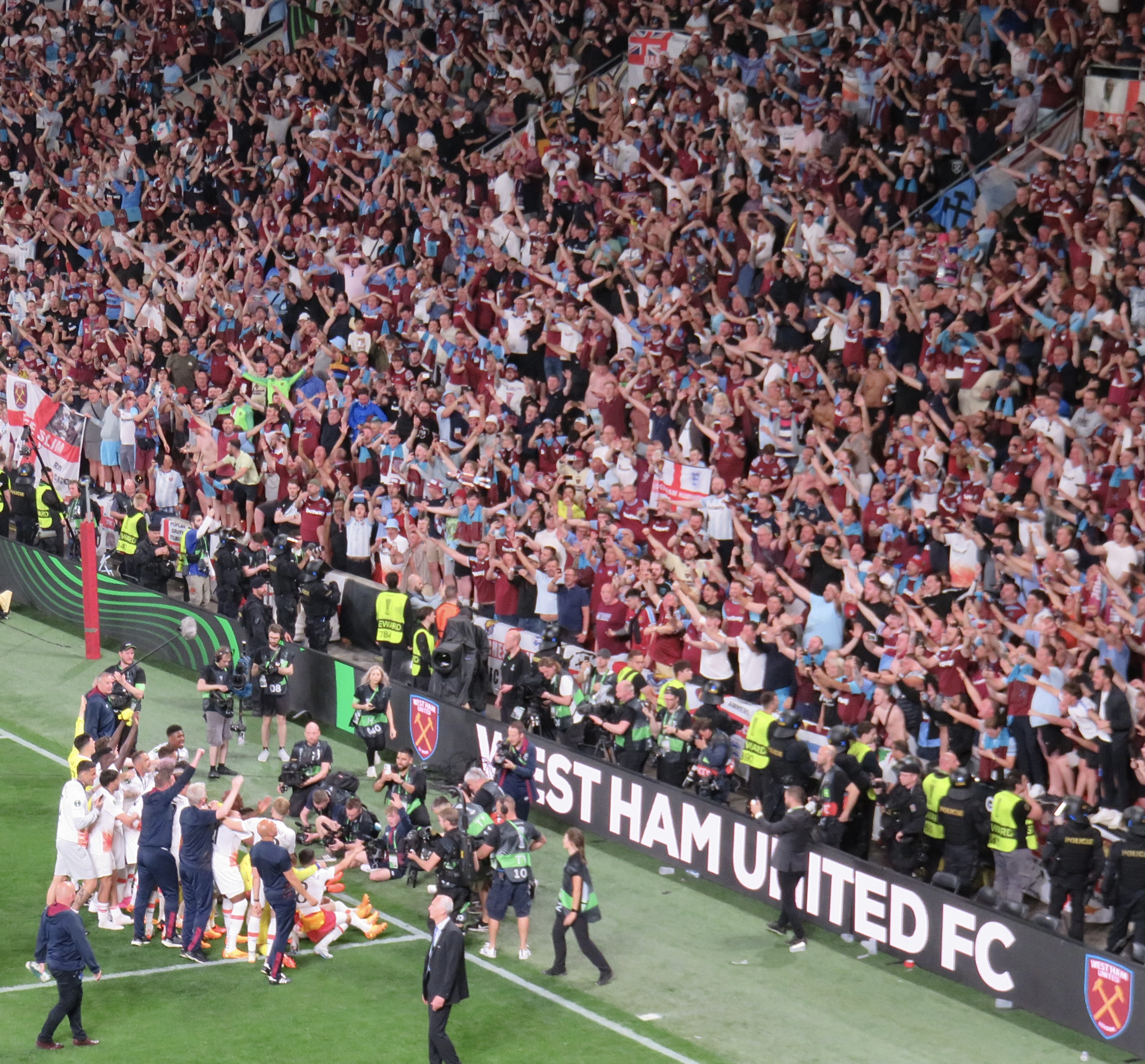
West Ham players, staff and fans celebrate winning the 2023 UEFA Europa Conference League final.

West Ham won their first three games of the year 2022, temporarily elevating the club to fourth place in the Premier League. The team beat Sevilla 2–1 on aggregate to reach a first European quarter-final in 41 years, followed by a 4–1 aggregate win over Lyon for a first such semi-final since 1976. Playing the same opposition they met in their 1976 European Cup Winners' Cup semi-final, Eintracht Frankfurt, West Ham were knocked out of the Europa League, following a 3–1 aggregate loss to the German side. At the end of the 2021–22 Premier League season, West Ham confirmed a second successive season of European football, qualifying for the UEFA Europa Conference League after finishing seventh. The season was also notable for being Mark Noble's final as a West Ham player, with the midfielder retiring from football after 18 years as a first team player at the club, making 550 appearances in all competitions, scoring 62 times. By finishing 7th in the 2021–22 Premier League, West Ham qualified for the 2022–23 Europa Conference League, entering at the play-off stage.

The 2022–23 campaign was a mixed bag. The club finished 14th in the Premier League, only securing their Premier League status with two games remaining and exiting the League Cup to lower league opposition in a season that saw manager David Moyes come under pressure. In January 2023, Mark Noble returned to the club as sporting director. Despite the troubles in West Ham's domestic campaign, they excelled in the Europa Conference League. The club progressed to the final unbeaten, winning 13 games and drawing just once. They went on to win the competition, defeating Fiorentina 2–1 in the final to claim their first major trophy since 1980 and their first European trophy in 58 years.

=== Moyes departure, managerial changes, and relegation (2023–present) ===
Despite having led West Ham to three consecutive European seasons for the first time in their history, reaching at least the quarter-finals of each and culminating in the 2023 success, Moyes was not offered a new contract. On 23 May 2024, the club named Julen Lopetegui as his replacement. However Lopetegui would be sacked on 8 January 2025 with the team in 14th position, seven points above the relegation positions; during his tenure, they lost nine of 20 Premier League games.

On 9 January Graham Potter was appointed as head coach signing a two–and–a–half year contract. This lasted until 27 September 2025 when Potter was sacked following poor results and performances over the second half of the 2024–25 season and the start of the 2025–26 season. Nuno Espírito Santo was appointed to take charge of the team, with West Ham 19th in the league.

By January 2026, Nuno's own managership was under question as they hit bottom three. After a stronger March and April which found them battling with Tottenham Hotspur and Nottingham Forest around the relegation zone, West Ham's defeat to Newcastle United on 17 May left them needing other results to go their way to avoid the drop. Despite a 3–0 win on the final day of the 2025–26 season at home to Leeds United, relegation rivals Tottenham Hotspur won against Everton, relegating West Ham.

== Crest ==
Club crest (1987–1998)

Club crest (1998–2016)

=== Thames Ironworks FC ===
The Thames Ironworks Team (1895–1900) used the Union Flag as its badge.

=== Rivet Hammers ===
The principal element of the badge is the crossed pair of rivet hammers, tools that were used in the shipbuilding industry. The Blackwall and Canning Town neighbourhoods surrounding the Thames Ironworks echoed to the sound of hammers; steam hammers, sledge hammers and rivet hammers.

Seven large mechanical steam hammers would punch small holes near the edges of the iron plates which would be joined to build the ships. The plates would be put in place and fixed together with rivets by teams of five, three inside the emerging vessel and two outside. Inside the ship one member of the team would heat the rivets till they were white hot and, using Iron Fingers (blacksmith's tongs), throw them to a second person, known as a "catch-boy" or "putter-in", who would pick the rivet up and place it the hole, also using tongs. The third person was known as the "holder-on" and he would then smash the rivet home with a sixteen-pound sledgehammer and then use his sledgehammer to hold the rivet in place while the men on the other side flattened the other end of the rivet.

Outside the ship, exposed to the elements, two men with rivet hammers – one right-handed, one left-handed – would hammer the protruding and still glowing rivet flat, so securing one of the many points necessary to link each of the ship's large plates. The crossed hammers were also incorporated into the coat of arms of the County Borough of West Ham and those of its successor, the modern London Borough of Newham. The Thames Ironworks lay partly within what is now the London Borough of Tower Hamlets. However, the blacksmith's tongs in that Borough's coat of arms represent the local saint, Dunstan, the patron saint of Stepney and metalworkers, rather than the Ironworks.

=== Tower ===
A yellow or white tower was added, intermittently, from the 1950s onwards. The primary reason for this seems to be to represent Anne Boleyn's Tower, the most notable feature of Green Street House, an originally Tudor group of buildings which stood next to the Boleyn Ground until demolished in 1955. Green Street House was also known as Boleyn Castle through an association with Anne Boleyn. The manor was reputedly one of the sites at which Henry VIII courted his second queen, though there is no documentary evidence to support the tradition. There are a number of other factors which may have influenced the inclusion of the stylised castle feature, for instance:

- to reflect the contribution made to the club by players of Old Castle Swifts
- The imposing towers, roofs and doorway of the Engineering Department of the Thames Ironworks bore a strong resemblance to the castle feature in earlier iterations of the badge.
- The first verse of the club's anthem, "I'm Forever Blowing Bubbles", begins "I'm dreaming dreams, I'm scheming schemes, I'm building castles high".
- The White Tower of the Tower of London as emblematic of East London. For hundreds of years, up until 1900, inner East London had been known as the Tower Division, an area which owed military service to the Tower of London. The (originally whitewashed) White Tower was used as insignia for the area, for instance on cap badges of local units of the army.
- In recognition of the 'West Ham Pals', the 13th Battalion of the Essex Regiment which was raised in Stratford in 1915 and saw extensive action and heavy losses on the Western Front in the World War I. The Battalion was formed from volunteers from West Ham and East London generally. Their war cry was "Up the Hammers". The cap badge of the Essex Regiment was the castle and key of Gibraltar, though the unit made an unsuccessful request to the War Office that crossed hammers could be used instead.
- The adoption (in 1904) of Boleyn Castle FC as the club's reserve side when they took over their grounds on the site.

=== Shield ===
A shield has been used in many iterations of the club badge, and the shape of the 2016 version matches the cross-section on the hull of HMS Warrior, the most famous ship built by the Thames Ironworks.

=== Iterations ===
The crest was redesigned and updated in the late 1990s, featuring a wider yellow castle with fewer cruciform "windows" along with the peaked roofs being removed; the tops of the towers had previously made the castle appear more akin to Disneyland's Sleeping Beauty's Castle than a functioning fortress. The designer also altered other details to give a more substantial feel to the iconography. When the club rebuilt the west stand of the Boleyn Ground (construction finished 2001–02) the "castle" from the redesigned badge was incorporated into the structure at the main entrance to the ground. A pair of towers were prominent features of the ground's appearance, both bearing large club badges.

A new badge was introduced following the end of the 2015–16 season, when the club moved into the Olympic Stadium. It removes the Boleyn Castle due to the club moving away, leaving just the crossed hammers, which the club says is inspired by the crest before and during the career of Bobby Moore. The word "London" was introduced below to "establish the club firmly on the international stage", and the more minimalist approach is to give a "strong statement that is instantly West Ham United". The shape of the crest is that of the hull of HMS Warrior, the first ironclad warship in the Royal Navy, which was built by Thames Ironworks.

== Colours ==
1895–96: First kit

The club originally wore navy blue, the sporting colours of Harrow School and Oxford University (see Oxford blue), both of which Thames Ironworks chairman Arnold Hills had attended and represented.

However, the team used a variety of kits, including sky blue shirts and white shorts from 1897 to 1899. The Irons permanently adopted claret and blue. the house colours of Thames ironworks, as home colours in 1903.

One story suggests that Thames Ironworks right-half Charlie Dove received the Aston Villa kit from William Belton, who was a professional sprinter of national repute, as well as being involved with the coaching at Thames Ironworks. Belton had been at a fair in Birmingham, close to Villa Park, the home ground of Aston Villa and was challenged to a race against four Villa players, who wagered money that one of them would win. Belton defeated them and, when they were unable to pay the bet, one of the Villa players who was responsible for washing the team's kit offered a complete team's "football kits" to Belton in payment. The Aston Villa player subsequently reported to his club that the kit was "missing". This, however, is often disputed. Thames Ironworks, and later West Ham United, retained the claret yoke/blue sleeves design, but also continued to use their previously favoured colours for their away kits.

== Terms and phrases ==
West Ham United does not have a club motto, but there are a number of well known inter-related phrases which capture the club's culture and philosophy:

- The West Ham Way: The 'West Ham Way' is an approach to football that is generally regarded as having developed from the innovative work of Ted Fenton, Malcolm Allison (the club captain) and others in the 1950s. Though not precisely defined, it can be broadly described as emphasising developing good players and good men thorough the youth system, honesty, commitment, some aggression and a preference for creative attacking football. There is significant continuity from the advice given to the team, by founder Arnold Hills, ahead of the 1896-1897 season, the club's second:

"As an old footballer myself, I would say, get into good condition at the beginning of the season, keep on the ball, play an unselfish game, pay heed to your captain, and whatever the fortunes of the first half of the game, never despair of winning, and never give up doing your very best to the last minute of the match. That is the way to play football, and better still, that is the way to make yourselves men."

— Arnold Hills letter to players, 16 March 1896

- Academy of Football: The term generally applies to the youth system which became a central part of the clubs philosophy and identity in the era of Ted Fenton and Malcom Allison in the 1950s and 1960s. The term is also applied to the club as a whole, in particular it has been applied to the meetings of players that club captain Malcolm Allison would hold at Cassettari's Café on Barking Road, a short distance from the Boleyn Ground. In these meetings players would exchange ideas on playing styles, formations and tactics, famously using pepperpots and other cafe paraphernalia as illustrative props.
- Moore than a Club: The term was coined in emulation of FC Barcelona, whose motto ‘More than a club’ describes how it sees itself as a family, a champion of the local community (partly through its charitable Foundation) and an expression of regional identity. It is also a play on words of the West Ham Academy's most famous graduate, Bobby Moore. West ham has its own West Ham United Foundation, serving East London and Essex.
- A Family Club: The club has long been described as a family club, and this has been described as meaning staff and supporters are part of the West Ham family. Historically, this has included an approach which has valued family values such loyalty, tradition and continuity, for instance in the appointment and retention of staff, such as board members, managers and coaches.

== Supporters, hooliganism and rivalries ==
=== Supporter songs ===
I'm forever blowing bubbles,

Pretty bubbles in the air.
They fly so high, nearly reach the sky,
Then like my dreams they fade and die.
Fortune's always hiding,
I've looked everywhere ...
I'm forever blowing bubbles,

pretty bubbles in the air.

— original lyrics to "Bubbles", from John Helliar

The team's supporters are famous for their rendition of the chorus of their team's anthem, "I'm Forever Blowing Bubbles" introduced to the club by former manager Charlie Paynter in the late 1920s. A Pears soap commercial featuring the curly haired child in the Millais' "Bubbles" was well known at the time. The child resembled a player, Billy J. "Bubbles" Murray, from local schoolboy team, Park School, where the headmaster was Cornelius Beal. Beal was known locally for his music and rhyme and wrote special words to the tune of "I'm Forever Blowing Bubbles" whenever any player was having a good game.

Beal was a friend of Paynter, while Murray was a West Ham trialist and played football at schoolboy level with a number of West Ham players such as Jim Barrett. Through this contrivance of association the club's fans took it upon themselves to begin singing the popular music hall tune before home games, sometimes reinforced by the presence of a house band requested to play the refrain by Charlie Paynter.

The 1975 FA Cup version – which contains the original lyrics, and features vocals from the team's then-current players – is always played before home games, with the home crowd joining in and carrying the song on after the music stops at the verse line "Fortune's always hiding". Bubbles was published as a waltz whereas during the game the crowd sing it in common time. When the players come onto the pitch, and at other times of celebration, as the song I'm forever blowing bubbles is being sung, around 60 bubble machines produce copious bubbles that rise high into the stadium. Since the 1950s, fans have also sung the East London pub song Knees Up Mother Brown. The song title is also the name of an internet forum related to the club.

Like other teams, the team also have a history of adopting or adapting popular songs of the day to fit particular events, themes, players or personas. These have included serious renditions of theatre and movie classics such as "The Bells are Ringing", along with more pun-laden or humorous efforts, such as chanting former player Paolo Di Canio's name to the canzone "La donna è mobile" by Giuseppe Verdi, or D.I. Canio to the tune of Ottawan's "D.I.S.C.O.", or the chant of "Who Let The Potts Out?" to the tune of Baha Men's "Who Let the Dogs Out?" when Steve Potts could be seen warming up to come on as substitute late on in his career, or "That's Zamora" to the tune of Dean Martin's 1953 "That's Amore" in honour of former striker Bobby Zamora. Other former players to be serenaded include Christian Dailly with vastly-altered lyrics to Frankie Valli's "Can't Take My Eyes Off You", Joe Cole and Carlton Cole with Spandau Ballet's "Gold" song title sung as "Cole" and Luděk Mikloško. A song for West Ham favourite Bobby Moore, "Viva Bobby Moore", is also sung based on The Business's "Oi!" rendition of the song, based on the Equals' 1969 release "Viva Bobby Joe". In 2016, supporters adapted the lyrics of Billy Ray Cyrus' "Achy Breaky Heart" in honour of Dimitri Payet.

Bow Bells are ringing, for the Claret and Blue,

Bow Bells are ringing, for the Claret and Blue,
When the Hammers are scoring, and the South Bank are roaring,
And the money is pouring, for the Claret and Blue,
Claret and Blue,
No relegation for the Claret and Blue,
Just celebration for the Claret and Blue,
One day we'll win a cup or two, or three,

Or four or more, for West Ham and the Claret and Blue.

— Supporters song to the tune of "The Bells are Ringing", circa 1960

=== Supporters ===
Much of the club’s support is concentrated in its East London home, and in the adjacent county of Essex, the main focus of the Cockney diaspora – the movement of East Londoners out of the capital. The club also partners with supporters clubs nationwide and around the world.

Fans gained national attention after giving a torrid time to David Beckham in his first away match of 1998–99 the season after the England midfielder was sent off for a petulant foul on Diego Simeone. Coinciding with the game, there were claims (and an image taken) that fans, organised by a hardcore, had hung an effigy of the player outside a local pub. Although it was later revealed that the pub was in South-East London, the heartland of West Ham's greatest rivals Millwall. The West Ham fans did, however, boo Beckham's every touch of the ball during the game.

Fans have barracked former players perceived to have abandoned the club or performed some disservice. Paul Ince, Frank Lampard, Jermain Defoe, Nigel Reo-Coker, Jesse Lingard and Mohammed Kudus have borne the brunt of verbal assaults. However, players such as Joe Cole, Michael Carrick, Rio Ferdinand, Bobby Zamora and Carlos Tevez who left on good terms received applause or standing ovations in recognition of their contributions to the club. Joe Cole subsequently rejoined West Ham from Liverpool midway through the 2012–13 season.

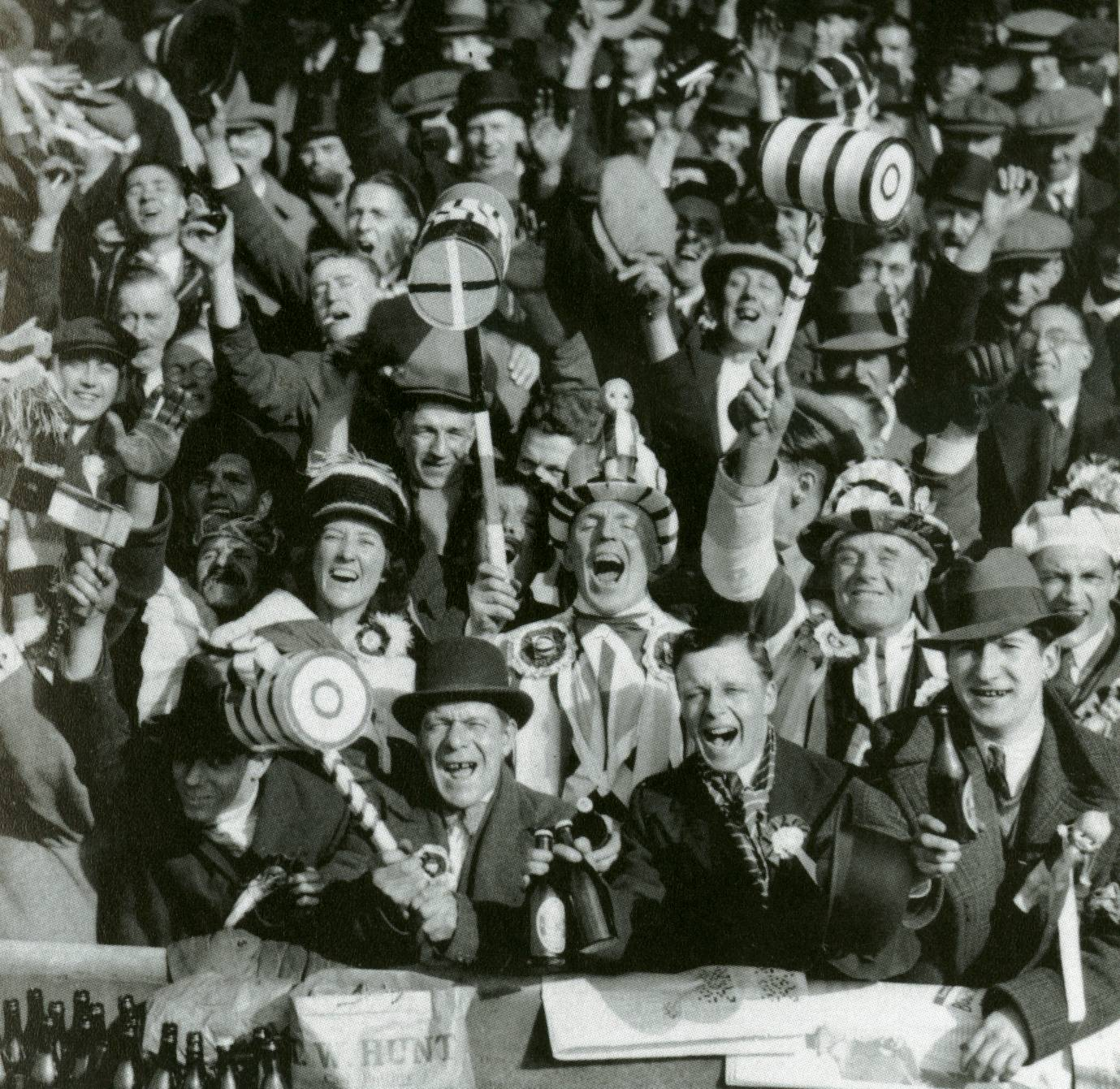
West Ham fans display their rosettes, scarves and novelty hammers at an FA Cup match in 1933.

=== Hooliganism ===
The origins of West Ham's links with hooliganism starts in the 1960s with the establishment of The Mile End Mob (named after an area of the East End of London). During the 1970s and 1980s (the main era for organised football-related violence), West Ham gained further notoriety for the levels of hooliganism in their fan base and antagonistic behaviour towards both their own and rival fans, and the police. During the 1970s in particular, rival groups of West Ham fans from neighbouring areas often did battle with each other at games, most often groups from the neighbouring districts of Barking and Dagenham.

The Inter City Firm were one of the first "casuals", so called because they avoided police supervision by not wearing football-related clothing and travelled to away matches on regular InterCity trains, rather than on the cheap and more tightly policed "football special" charter trains. The group were an infamous West Ham-aligned gang. As the firm's moniker "inter city" suggests violent activities were not confined to local derbies – the hooligans were content to cause trouble at any game, though nearby teams often bore the brunt. The 1989 film The Firm (starring Gary Oldman), as well as the 2005 film Green Street (starring Elijah Wood and Charlie Hunnam), are based upon West Ham hooligan firms.

=== Rivalries ===
West Ham have strong rivalries with several other clubs. Most of these are with other London clubs, especially with Tottenham Hotspur in an East versus North London rivalry and with Chelsea in an East versus West London rivalry. The rivalry between West Ham and Tottenham has been fuelled by players such as Michael Carrick, Martin Peters, Paul Allen, Jermain Defoe and Scott Parker leaving the Hammers to join Tottenham. The rivalry deepened with the appointment of former Hammers manager Harry Redknapp as Tottenham's manager. Since the 2006–07 Premier League season, West Ham have developed a strong rivalry with Yorkshire club Sheffield United due to the dubious circumstances surrounding the transfer of Carlos Tevez, who helped West Ham avoid relegation at Sheffield United's expense.

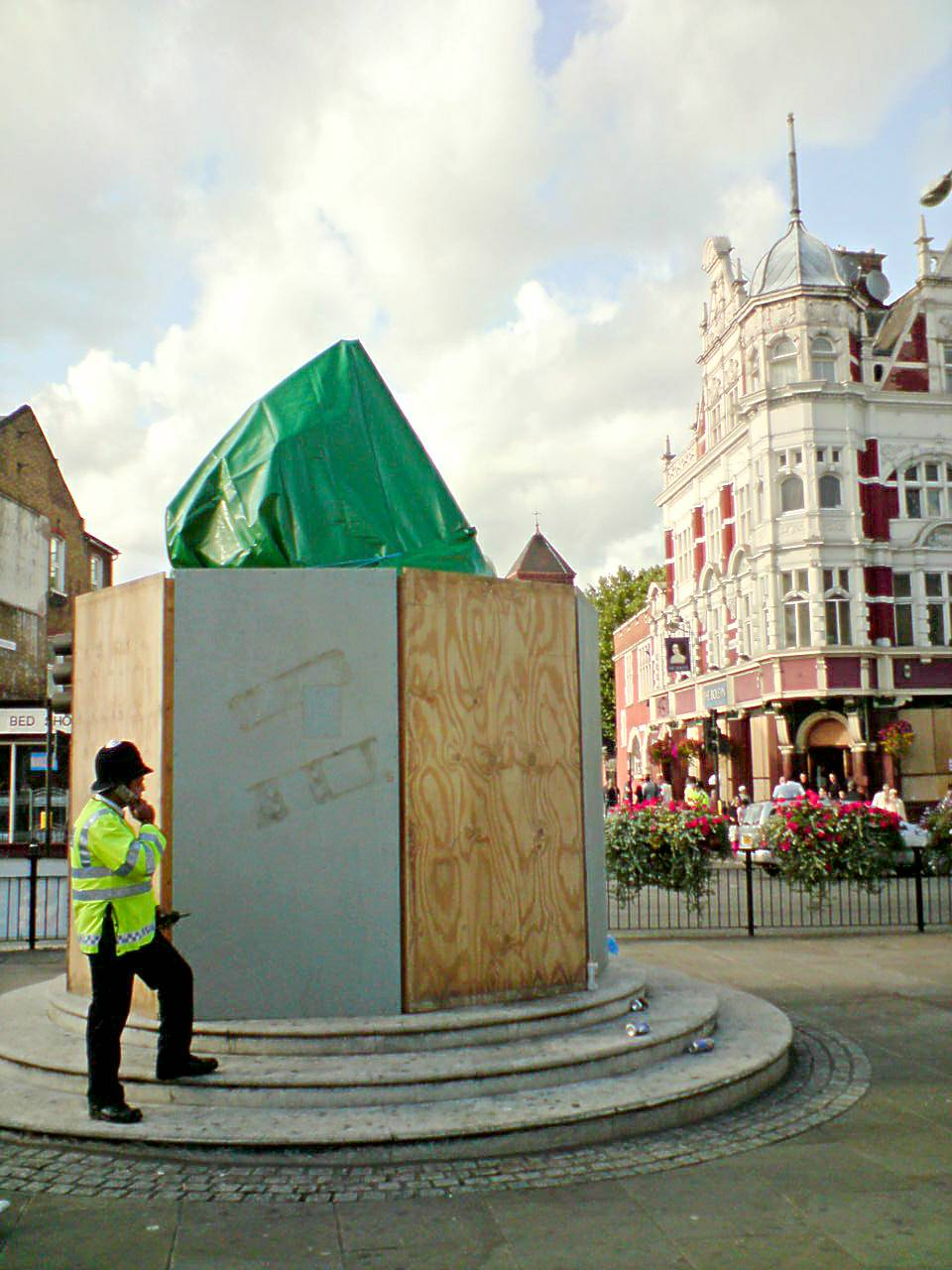
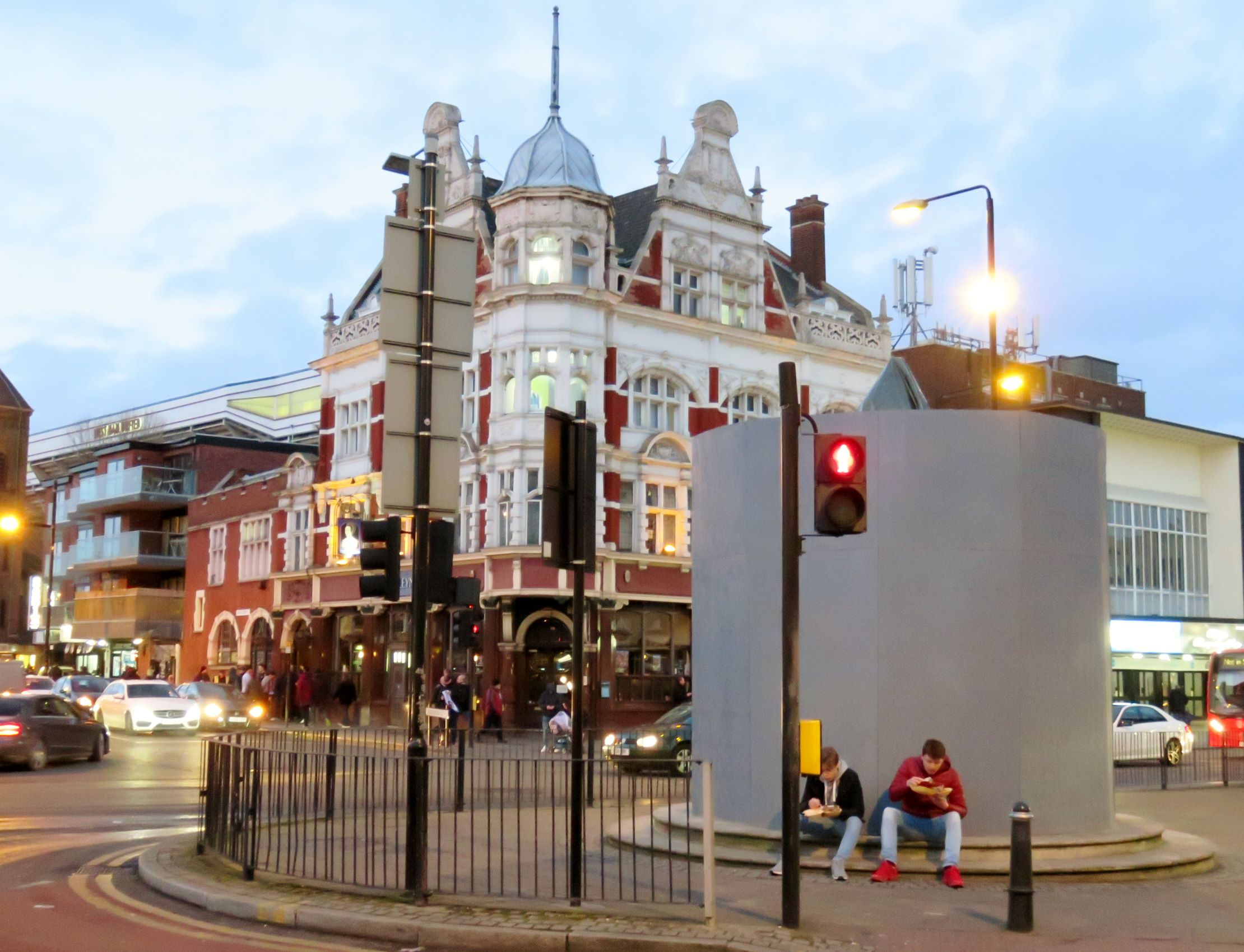
The "Champions" statue, of Moore, with the World Cup, Hurst, Peters and Ray Wilson, boarded-up for protection before the visits of Millwall on 25 August 2009 and Tottenham Hotspur in March 2016

The oldest and fiercest rivalry is with Millwall. The two sides are local rivals, having both been founded by employees of local companies, with players living in the same localities. The early history of both clubs are intertwined, with West Ham proving to be the more successful in a number of meetings between the two teams at the time, resulting in West Ham being promoted at the expense of Millwall. Millwall later declined to join the fledgling Football League while West Ham went on to the top division and an FA Cup final. Later in the 1920s, the rivalry was intensified during strike action which Isle of Dogs-based companies (i.e., Millwall fans) refused to support, breeding ill will between the two camps, the bitterness of this betrayal enduring for years. In 1972, a Millwall supporter died at New Cross station after falling out of a train during a fight with West Ham fans.

The rivalry between West Ham and Millwall has involved considerable violence and is one of the most notorious within the world of football hooliganism. The teams were drawn against each other in the second round of the 2009–10 League Cup and met on 25 August 2009 at Upton Park. This was the first time in four years that the two clubs had played each other, and the first ever in the League Cup. Clashes between fans occurred outside the ground, resulting in violence erupting up to half a mile away from the stadium, with serious injuries, including the stabbing of a Millwall supporter, damage to property and several arrests reported by police. There were also several pitch invasions by West Ham supporters which brought a temporary halt to the game. In January 2010, West Ham were fined after being found guilty of violent, threatening, obscene and provocative behaviour and of failing to prevent their fans entering the field of play. Millwall were cleared of all charges.

=== Nicknames ===
The team and supporters are known as The Hammers, in part because of the club's origins as Thames Ironworks. They are also known as The Irons.

== Stadium ==
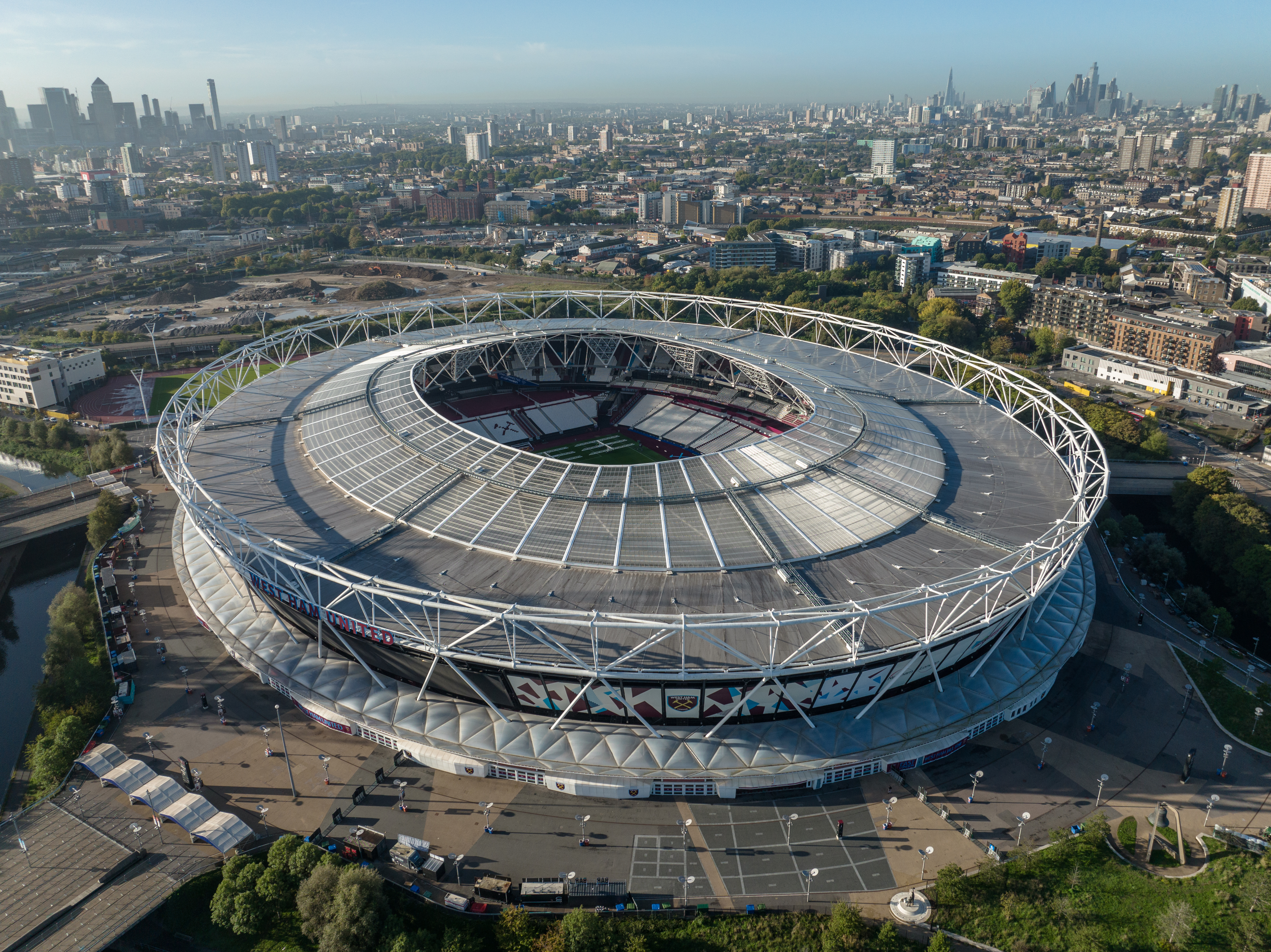
West Ham moved into the Olympic Stadium in 2016.

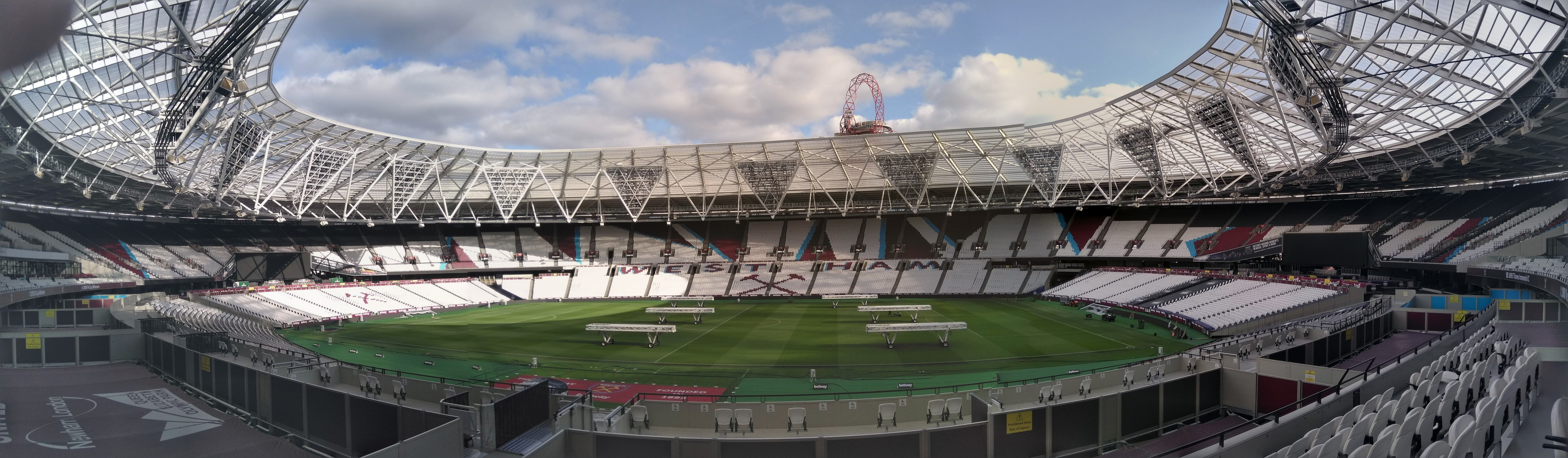
Panorama of the interior of the London Stadium

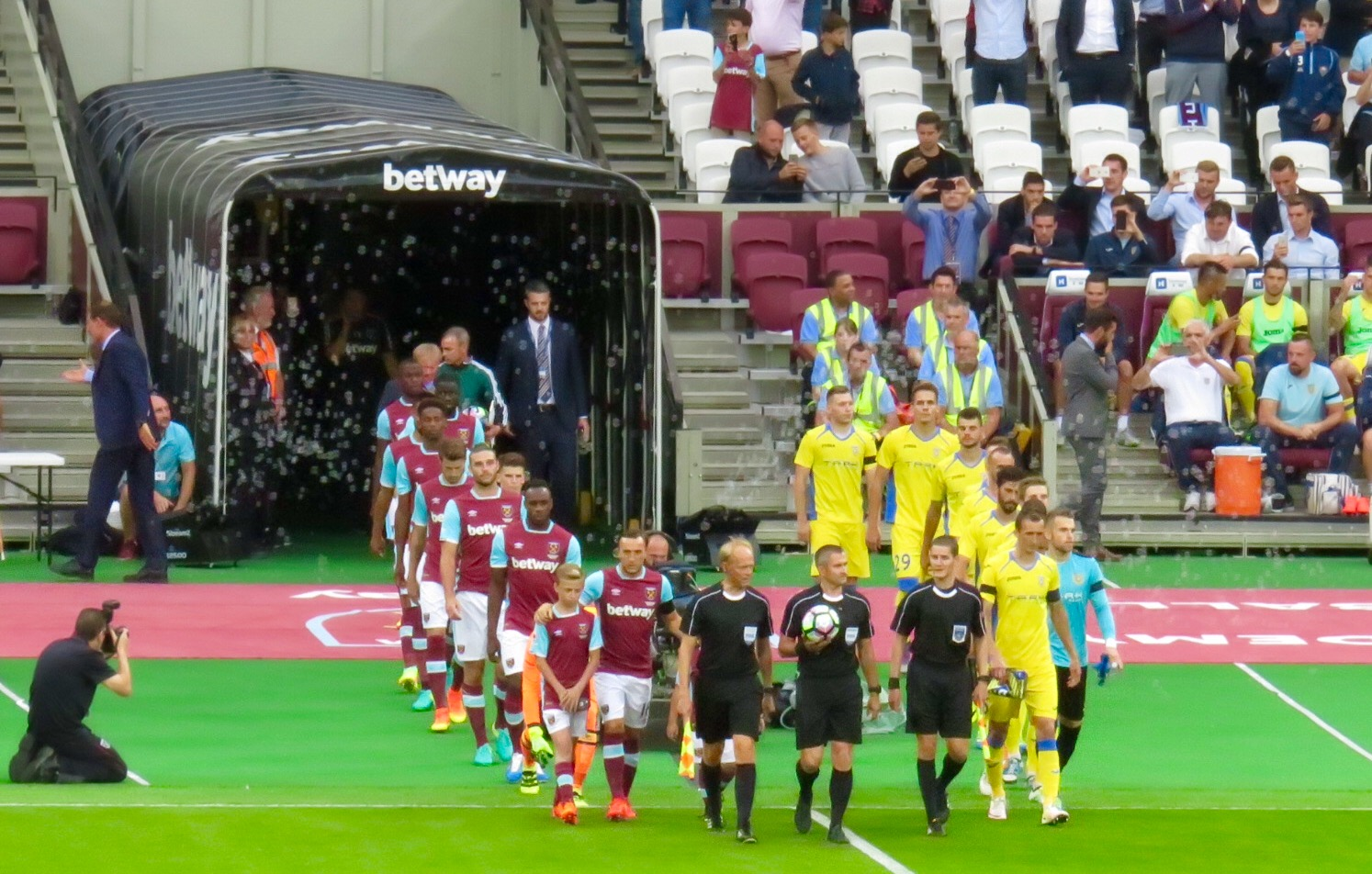
West Ham and Domžale enter the pitch for first ever football game at London Stadium.

Until 2016, West Ham were based at the Boleyn Ground, commonly known as Upton Park, in Newham, East London. The capacity of the Boleyn Ground was 35,016, and had been West Ham's ground since 1904. Prior to this, in their previous incarnation of Thames Ironworks, they played at Hermit Road in Canning Town and briefly at Browning Road in East Ham, before moving to the Memorial Grounds in Plaistow in 1897. They retained the stadium during their transition to becoming West Ham United and were there for a further four seasons before moving to the Boleyn Ground in 1904.

Former chairman Eggert Magnússon made clear his ambition for West Ham to move to the Olympic Stadium after the 2012 Summer Olympics, a desire reiterated by current chairmen Gold and Sullivan when they assumed control of the club stating that they felt it was a logical move for the government as it was in the borough of Newham.

In February 2010, however, the British Olympic Minister stated that West Ham would not get the stadium, and it would instead be used for track and field. On 17 May 2010, West Ham and Newham London Borough Council submitted a formal plan to the Olympic Park Legacy Company for the use of the Olympic Stadium following the 2012 Summer Olympics. The proposal was for a stadium with a capacity of 60,000 which would retain a competition athletics track. The proposal was welcomed by the chairman of UK athletics, Ed Warner, who said, "I think it will feel great as a football stadium and I speak as a football fan as well the chairman of UK Athletics. I think you'd find West Ham would cover the track in the winter season so it wouldn't look like you had a track between you and the pitch."

On 30 September 2010, the club formally submitted its bid for the Olympic Stadium with a presentation at 10 Downing Street, and on 8 October 2010 the world's largest live entertainment company, Live Nation, endorsed the club's Olympic Stadium plans. Three days after Live Nation's backing, UK Athletics confirmed its formal support for West Ham United and Newham Council in their joint bid to take over the Olympic Stadium in legacy mode. In November 2010, West Ham began a search for potential developers for "informal discussions" about what would happen to the ground if it were to win its bid to take over the Olympic Stadium after the 2012 Games. According to the club, the site could be vacated and open to redevelopment by summer 2014. On 11 February 2011, the Olympic Park Legacy Committee selected West Ham as the preferred club to move into the Olympic Stadium after the 2012 Games.

The decision in favour of West Ham's bid was unanimous, although controversial as local Premier League rivals Tottenham Hotspur had also been bidding for the venue. Hopes of moving to the stadium, however, were since placed under doubt following a legal challenge by Tottenham and Leyton Orient, with Leyton Orient – a perennial (since 1980) tier 3 to tier 5 club – fearful that having West Ham playing less than a mile away from their Brisbane Road ground could steal support from the club and put them out of business. Both clubs' appeals for a judicial review, however, were rejected on 23 June 2011. On 3 March 2011, West Ham's proposed move to the Olympic Stadium was formally approved by the British government and then-Mayor of London Boris Johnson.

On 8 June 2011, it was confirmed that the Westfield Shopping Centre had been in detailed talks with West Ham for naming rights of the new Olympic stadium which could be called the Westfield Stadium. West Ham announced plans to move from the Boleyn Ground from the 2014–15 season. In August 2011, an independent investigation initiated by the Olympic Park Legacy Company upheld the decision to award West Ham the Olympic Stadium after the 2012 Games. On 29 June 2011, however, Tottenham announced that they were returning to the High Court again to fight the decision to award West Ham the stadium, in an oral hearing, to try to overturn the original High Court appeal being rejected. On 25 August 2011, Tottenham and Leyton Orient were in fact granted a judicial review by the High Court into the Olympic Stadium bidding process. On 11 October 2011, the deal to award West Ham the Olympic Stadium collapsed over concerns of legal pressure, with the government deciding that the stadium will stay in public ownership. Six days later, Tottenham and Leyton Orient announced they had ended their legal challenge after the deal collapsed.

Once the original deal collapsed, a new process to select a tenant was begun. West Ham immediately announced plans to become tenants of the stadium. By March 2012, West Ham was one of the four bidders for the stadium. With a decision due by the Olympic Park Legacy Company in May 2012, Mayor of London Boris Johnson delayed the final selection of future tenants until completion of the 2012 Summer Olympics, stating that it was "overwhelmingly likely" that the tenants would be West Ham.

It was announced on 22 March 2013 that West Ham had signed a 99-year lease for the Olympic Stadium after the government agreed to put in an extra £1 million towards the costs of converting the site. The club's plan was to move into the stadium prior to the start of the 2016–17 season. Supporters of rival clubs had pressed for an inquiry into the granting of West Ham's tenancy, arguing that West Ham were being given an unfair advantage by the arrangement. In September 2015, however, the government rejected holding such an inquiry.

== The Academy of Football ==
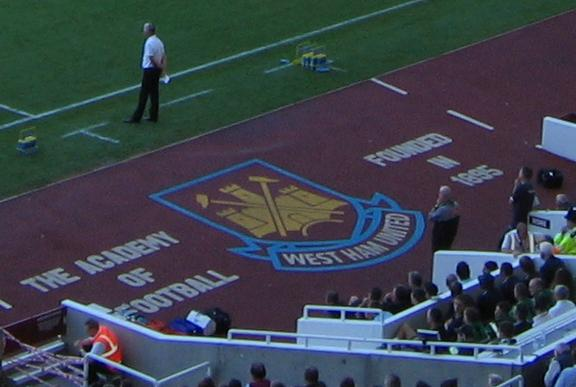
"Academy of Football"

The club promotes the popular idea of West Ham being "The Academy of Football", with the moniker adorning the ground's new stadium façade. The comment predominantly refers to the club's youth development system which was established by manager Ted Fenton during the 1950s, that has seen a number of international players emerge through the ranks. Most notably, the club contributed three players to the World Cup-winning England side of 1966, including club icon Bobby Moore, as well as Martin Peters and Geoff Hurst who between them scored all of England's goals in the eventual 4–2 victory. Other academy players that have gone on to play for England have included Trevor Brooking, Alvin Martin, Tony Cottee, Paul Ince, and Declan Rice.

Since the late 1990s, Rio Ferdinand, Frank Lampard, Joe Cole, Michael Carrick and Glen Johnson began their careers at West Ham and all went on to play for other clubs. Most recently, the likes of first teamers Mark Noble and James Tomkins, as well as Welsh international Jack Collison, have emerged through the Academy. Frustratingly for fans and managers alike, the club has struggled to retain many of these players due to (predominantly) financial reasons. West Ham, during the 2007–08 season, had an average of 6.61 English players in the starting line up, higher than any other Premier League club, which cemented their status as one of the few Premier League clubs left that were recognised to be bringing through young English talent and were recognised as having "homegrown players". Between 2000 and 2011, the club produced eight England players, as many as Manchester United and one fewer than Arsenal. Much of the success of the academy has been attributed to Tony Carr, who was West Ham youth coach between 1973 and 2014.

== Players ==
=== Current squad ===
As of 22 August 2026

Note: Flags indicate national team as defined under FIFA eligibility rules; some limited exceptions apply. Players may hold more than one non-FIFA nationality.

No.	Pos.	Nation	Player
1	GK	DEN	Mads Hermansen
2	DF	ENG	Kyle Walker-Peters
3	DF	ENG	Maximilian Kilman
4	MF	MEX	Edson Álvarez
5	DF	BRA	Morato (on loan from Nottingham Forest)
7	MF	BEL	Arne Engels
9	FW	SUR	Joël Piroe (on loan from Leeds United)
10	FW	ISR	Manor Solomon
11	FW	ARG	Taty Castellanos
14	MF	ENG	Divine Mukasa (on loan from Manchester City)
15	DF	GRE	Konstantinos Mavropanos
17	MF	MLI	Mohamadou Kanté
18	DF	ESP	Adama Boiro (on loan from Athletic Bilbao)
19	FW	BRA	Pablo

No.	Pos.	Nation	Player
20	FW	ENG	Jarrod Bowen (captain)
21	MF	VEN	Keiber Lamadrid
22	FW	CIV	Maxwel Cornet
23	GK	FRA	Alphonse Areola
27	MF	FRA	Soungoutou Magassa
28	MF	CZE	Tomáš Souček
30	DF	ENG	Oliver Scarles
34	DF	NED	Joël Veltman
35	MF	NOR	Edvin Austbø
49	GK	ENG	Finlay Herrick
58	DF	ENG	Airidas Golambeckis
61	MF	ENG	Lewis Orford
63	DF	ENG	Ezra Mayers
66	FW	ENG	Joshua Ajala

=== Out on loan ===
Note: Flags indicate national team as defined under FIFA eligibility rules; some limited exceptions apply. Players may hold more than one non-FIFA nationality.

No.	Pos.	Nation	Player
25	DF	FRA	Jean-Clair Todibo (at Lens until 30 June 2027)
29	DF	COD	Aaron Wan-Bissaka (at Aston Villa until 30 June 2027)

No.	Pos.	Nation	Player
42	DF	ENG	Kaelan Casey (at Stevenage until 30 June 2027)
—	FW	GER	Niclas Füllkrug (at Werder Bremen until 30 June 2027)

=== Retired numbers ===
- 6 (England) Bobby Moore, Defender (1958–74) – posthumous honour
- 38 (Australia) Dylan Tombides, Striker (2010–14) – posthumous honour

=== Club captains ===
Dates	Name	Notes
1895–97	(Scotland) Bob Stevenson	
1897–99	(England) Walter Tranter	
1899	(England) Tom Bradshaw	Bradshaw died on Christmas Day 1899.
1899–01	(England) Charlie Dove	
1901–03	Unknown	
c.1903–04	(England) Ernest Watts	
1904–07	(Scotland) David Gardner	
1907–11	(England) Frank Piercy	
1911–14	(England) Tommy Randall	
1914–15	(England) Dick Leafe	
1915–22	(England) Billy Cope	Also captained fixtures during World War I.
1922–25	(England) George Kay	
1925–26	(England) Billy Moore	
1926–28	(England) Jack Hebden	
1928–32	(England) Stanley Earle	
1932–37	(England) Jim Barrett	
1937–46	(England) Charles Bicknell	Remained captain for fixtures during World War II.
1946–51	(England) Dick Walker	Following his retirement, he helped to clean the boots of younger players
1951–57	(England) Malcolm Allison	Fell ill with tuberculosis after a game in 1957 and consequently had a lung removed
1957–60	(Republic of Ireland) Noel Cantwell	First captain not from the United Kingdom
1960–62	(Wales) Phil Woosnam	
1962–74	(England) Bobby Moore	
1974–84	(England) Billy Bonds	
1984–90	(England) Alvin Martin	
1990–92	(England) Ian Bishop	
1992–93	(England) Julian Dicks	
1993–96	(England) Steve Potts	
1996–97	(England) Julian Dicks	
1997–2001	(Northern Ireland) Steve Lomas	
2001–03	(Italy) Paolo Di Canio	First captain not from the British Isles
2003	(England) Joe Cole	
2003–05	(Scotland) Christian Dailly	
2005–07	(England) Nigel Reo-Coker	
2007–09	(Australia) Lucas Neill	First captain from outside Europe
2009–11	(England) Matthew Upson	
2011–15	(England) Kevin Nolan	
2015–22	(England) Mark Noble	
2022–23	(England) Declan Rice	
2023–24	(France) Kurt Zouma	
2024–	(England) Jarrod Bowen	

=== Hammer of the Year ===
The following is a list of recipients of the 'Hammer of the Year' award. The first award, to Andy Malcolm in 1957–58, was nominated by a journalist at The Stratford Express. Subsequent recipients would be awarded the title after a vote by supporters. Trevor Brooking was the first player for West Ham United to have been honoured with the title of Hammer of the Year three times in a row in 1976, 1977 and 1978. Scott Parker repeated this feat between 2009 and 2011. Brooking has won the award the most times, on five occasions: 1972, 1976, 1977, 1978 and 1984. Bobby Moore, Billy Bonds and Julian Dicks have each won it four times. Bobby Moore has been runner-up four times, while Billy Bonds and Tony Cottee have both been runners-up three times. Billy Bonds and Trevor Brooking's wins are notable in the amount of time between first and last Hammer of the Year award. Bonds has 16 years separating his wins whilst Brooking has 12.

Year	Winner	Runner-up
1958	(England) Andy Malcolm	–
1959	(England) Ken Brown	–
1960	(England) Malcolm Musgrove	–
1961	(England) Bobby Moore	–
1962	(Scotland) Lawrie Leslie	(Scotland) John Dick
1963	(England) Bobby Moore	(England) Jim Standen
1964	(England) Johnny Byrne	(England) Bobby Moore
1965	(England) Martin Peters	(England) Bobby Moore
1966	(England) Geoff Hurst	(England) Martin Peters
1967	(England) Geoff Hurst	(England) Bobby Moore
1968	(England) Bobby Moore	(England) Trevor Brooking
1969	(England) Geoff Hurst	(England) Billy Bonds
1970	(England) Bobby Moore	(England) Billy Bonds
1971	(England) Billy Bonds	(England) Bobby Moore
1972	(England) Trevor Brooking	(Scotland) Bobby Ferguson
1973	(England) Pop Robson	(England) Trevor Brooking
1974	(England) Billy Bonds	(England) Mervyn Day
1975	(England) Billy Bonds	(England) Mervyn Day
1976	(England) Trevor Brooking	(England) Graham Paddon
1977	(England) Trevor Brooking	(England) Alan Devonshire
1978	(England) Trevor Brooking	–
1979	(England) Alan Devonshire	(England) Pop Robson
1980	(England) Alvin Martin	(Scotland) Ray Stewart
1981	(England) Phil Parkes	(England) Geoff Pike
1982	(England) Alvin Martin	(England) Trevor Brooking
1983	(England) Alvin Martin	(England) Phil Parkes
1984	(England) Trevor Brooking	(England) Tony Cottee
1985	(England) Paul Allen	(England) Tony Cottee
1986	(England) Tony Cottee	(Scotland) Frank McAvennie
1987	(England) Billy Bonds	(England) Mark Ward
1988	(England) Stewart Robson	(England) Billy Bonds
1989	(England) Paul Ince	(England) Julian Dicks
1990	(England) Julian Dicks	(England) Stuart Slater
1991	(Czechoslovakia) Luděk Mikloško	(England) George Parris
1992	(England) Julian Dicks	(England) Steve Potts

Year	Winner	Runner-up
1993	(England) Steve Potts	(England) Kevin Keen
1994	(England) Trevor Morley	(England) Steve Potts
1995	(England) Steve Potts	(England) Tony Cottee
1996	(England) Julian Dicks	(Northern Ireland) Iain Dowie
1997	(England) Julian Dicks	(Croatia) Slaven Bilić
1998	(England) Rio Ferdinand	(Northern Ireland) Steve Lomas
1999	(Trinidad and Tobago) Shaka Hislop	(England) Ian Pearce
2000	(Italy) Paolo Di Canio	(England) Trevor Sinclair
2001	(England) Stuart Pearce	(Italy) Paolo Di Canio
2002	(France) Sébastien Schemmel	(England) Joe Cole
2003	(England) Joe Cole	(England) Jermain Defoe
2004	(England) Matthew Etherington	(England) Michael Carrick
2005	(England) Teddy Sheringham	(England) Mark Noble
2006	(Wales) Danny Gabbidon	(England) Marlon Harewood
2007	(Argentina) Carlos Tevez	(England) Bobby Zamora
2008	(England) Robert Green	(Northern Ireland) George McCartney
2009	(England) Scott Parker	(England) Robert Green
2010	(England) Scott Parker	(Italy) Alessandro Diamanti
2011	(England) Scott Parker	(England) Robert Green
2012	(England) Mark Noble	(England) James Tomkins
2013	(New Zealand) Winston Reid	(Finland) Jussi Jääskeläinen
2014	(England) Mark Noble	(Spain) Adrián
2015	(England) Aaron Cresswell	(Spain) Adrián
2016	(France) Dimitri Payet	(England) Michail Antonio
2017	(England) Michail Antonio	(Argentina) Manuel Lanzini
2018	(Austria) Marko Arnautović	(Republic of Ireland) Declan Rice
2019	(Poland) Łukasz Fabiański	(England) Declan Rice
2020	(England) Declan Rice	(Italy) Angelo Ogbonna
2021	(Czech Republic) Tomáš Souček	(Czech Republic) Vladimír Coufal
2022	(England) Declan Rice	(England) Jarrod Bowen
2023	(England) Declan Rice	(Algeria) Saïd Benrahma
2024	(England) Jarrod Bowen	(Ghana) Mohammed Kudus
2025	(Democratic Republic of the Congo) Aaron Wan-Bissaka	(England) Jarrod Bowen
2026	(Greece) Konstantinos Mavropanos	(Portugal) Mateus Fernandes

=== Lifetime Achievement Award ===
In 2013, West Ham United introduced a new annual award, the West Ham United Lifetime Achievement Award. The first award was presented to club-record appearance maker Billy Bonds, who picked up the award on the pitch at Upton Park before kick-off against Cardiff City on the opening day of the 2013–14 season. The 2014 award was presented to Sir Trevor Brooking, a record five-time winner of the Hammer of the Year award. Brooking received the award before the 2014–15 season curtain-raiser against Tottenham Hotspur on 16 August 2014. Brooking had already had the Centenary Stand at the Boleyn ground named after him in 2009. The 2015 award was awarded to Martin Peters. On 3 May 2016, it was announced via the club's official website that the fourth recipient of the award would be Sir Geoff Hurst, the club's second all-time leading goalscorer, and scorer of a hat-trick in the 1966 World Cup Final. Hurst would be honoured at the club's 2015/16 Player Awards Ceremony. Ken Brown became the sixth recipient of the award, in April 2018. The 2019 honour was awarded to midfielder Ronnie Boyce who made his debut for West Ham in 1960.

Year	Winner
2013	(England) Billy Bonds MBE
2014	(England) Sir Trevor Brooking
2015	(England) Martin Peters MBE
2016	(England) Sir Geoff Hurst
2017	(England) Bobby Moore OBE
2018	(England) Ken Brown
2019	(England) Ronnie Boyce

=== Mark Noble Young Hammer of the Year Award ===
In honour of Mark Noble, who was also the award winner in 2004, and had been serving the club since 2000 and retired in 2022, the Young Hammer of the Year award was renamed to Mark Noble Young Hammer of the Year Award on 9 May 2022.

Year	Winner
2003	(England) Glen Johnson
2004	(England) Mark Noble
2005	(England) Mark Noble (2)
2006	(England) Anton Ferdinand
2007	(England) Junior Stanislas
2008	(England) James Tomkins
2009	(England) Jack Collison
2010	(England) Zavon Hines
2011	(England) Freddie Sears
2012	(England) Dan Potts
2013	(England) George Moncur
2014	(England) Sam Howes
2015	(England) Reece Burke
2016	(England) Reece Oxford
2017	(Republic of Ireland) / (England) Declan Rice
2018	(Republic of Ireland) / (England) Declan Rice (2)
2019	(Republic of Ireland) / (England) Declan Rice (3)
2020	(England) Nathan Holland
2021	(England) Ben Johnson
2022	(England) Ben Johnson (2)
2023	(England) Divin Mubama
2024	(England) George Earthy
2025	(England) Oliver Scarles
2026	(England) Ezra Mayers

== Current staff ==
As of 6 June 2026

Staff and directors

Position	Name
Joint-chairs	Daniel Křetínský
Joint-chairs	Vanessa Gold
Director	Pavel Horský
Director	Peter Mitka
Director	Jiří Švarc
Director	Jack Sullivan
Director	Daniel Cunningham
Non-executive director	Daniel Harris
Non-executive director	Tripp Smith
Honorary life president	Terry Brown
Club secretary	Andrew Pincher
Chief finance officer	Andy Mollett
Projects & stadium operations director	Philippa Cartwright
Executive director, marketing & communications	Tara Warren
Club ambassador	Tony Carr MBE
Sporting director	Mark Noble

Coaching staff

Position	Name
Head coach	Scott Parker
Assistant coach	Jonathan Hill
First team coaches	Steve Potts
First team coaches	Gerard Prenderville
Goalkeeping coach	Billy Lepine
Director of player recruitment	Nils Koppen
Academy director	Kenny Brown
Head of coaching and player development	Greg Lincoln
Performance director	Richard Collinge
First team physiotherapist	Dominic Rogan
Lead fitness coach	Jordan Smith

== Managers ==
West Ham United have had 21 permanent managers in their history and an additional three caretaker managers.

Manager	Caretaker Manager	Period	G	W	D	L	Win %	Honours/Notes (major honours shown in bold)
(England) Syd King		1901–32	638	248	146	244	38.87	Club's longest serving manager (31 years). FA Cup runners-up 1923
(England) Charlie Paynter		1932–50	480	198	116	166	41.25	
(England) Ted Fenton		1950–61	484	193	107	184	39.87	Division Two Champions 1957–58
(England) Ron Greenwood		1961–74	613	215	165	233	35.07	**FA Cup winners 1964**, **UEFA Cup Winners Cup winners 1965.** League Cup runners-up 1966.
(England) John Lyall		1974–89	**708**	**277**	176	255	39.12	**FA Cup winners 1975, 1980.** Highest league finish in club's history (3rd in Division One 1985–86). UEFA Cup Winners' Cup runners-up 1976; League Cup runners-up 1981.
(Scotland) Lou Macari		1989–90	38	14	12	12	36.84	
	(England) Ronnie Boyce	1990	1	0	1	0	0.00	
(England) Billy Bonds		1990–94	227	99	61	67	43.61	
(England) Harry Redknapp		1994–01	327	121	85	121	37.00	UEFA Intertoto Cup joint winners 1999 (European qualification). Club's highest Premier League finish (5th, 1998–99)
(England) Glenn Roeder		2001–03	86	27	23	36	31.40	
	(England) Trevor Brooking	2003	14	9	4	1	**64.29**	
(England) Alan Pardew		2003–06	163	67	38	58	41.10	Championship Play-off Winners 2005, FA Cup runners-up 2006 (UEFA Cup qualification)
(England) Alan Curbishley		2006–08	71	28	14	29	39.44	
	(England) Kevin Keen	2008	1	0	0	1	0.00	
(Italy) Gianfranco Zola		2008–10	80	23	21	36	28.75	Club's first non-British manager.
(Israel) Avram Grant		2010–11	47	15	12	20	31.91	Club's first non EU manager.
	(England) Kevin Keen	2011	1	0	0	1	0.00	
(England) Sam Allardyce		2011–15	181	68	46	67	37.57	Championship Play-off Winners 2012.
(Croatia) Slaven Bilić		2015–17	111	42	30	39	37.84	
(Scotland) David Moyes		2017–18	31	9	10	12	29.03	
(Chile) Manuel Pellegrini		2018–19	64	24	11	29	37.50	
(Scotland) David Moyes		2019–2024	231	103	45	83	44.59	**UEFA Europa Conference League winners 2023.** Highest win percentage of club's permanent managers. Highest Premier League win percentage of club's Premier League era managers.
(Spain) Julen Lopetegui		2024–2025	22	7	5	10	31.82	
(England) Graham Potter		2025	25	6	5	14	24.00	
(Portugal) Nuno Espírito Santo		2025–2026	53	19	15	19	35.85	
(England) Scott Parker		2026-	2	0	1	1	00.00	

== Ownership and chairmen ==
In January 2010, David Sullivan and David Gold acquired a 50% share in West Ham, given them overall operational and commercial control. At the end of May 2010, Gold and Sullivan purchased a further 10% stake in the club at a cost of £8 million. Taking their controlling stake to 60%, they announced that they could open up shares for fans to purchase. On 9 August 2010, Gold and Sullivan increased their shares up to 30.6% each with "minority investors", (which included former owner Terry Brown, purchasing a further 3.8% of the club at a cost of around −4 million) leaving Icelandic Straumur Investment Bank owning 35% of the club.

On 2 July 2013, Sullivan acquired a further 25% of shares after restructuring the debt of the club, leaving Straumur Bank with just 10%. In order to clear club debts before a move to the Olympic Stadium in 2016, in December 2014 Sullivan announced the availability for sale of 20% of the club. The clearing of club debts, given in July 2013 as £70 million, was given as a pre-condition to a move to the Olympic Stadium. In September 2017, American billionaire J. Albert "Tripp" Smith, senior management director of Blackstone Inc., bought 10% of the shares of the club. On 10 November 2021, the club announced Czech billionaire Daniel Křetínský had acquired 27% of the shares of the club, reducing Gold and Sullivan's shares. Co-chairman David Gold died on 4 January 2023, leaving Sullivan as the sole chairman. Seven months later, Gold's daughter Vanessa became joint-chair with Sullivan. On 6 June 2026, Sullivan stood down as chairman.

== Honours ==
=== Domestic ===
League

- Second Division / First Division / Championship (level 2)
  - Champions: 1957–58, 1980–81
  - Runners-up: 1922–23, 1990–91, 1992–93
  - Play-off winners: 2005, 2012

Cups

- FA Cup
  - Winners: 1963–64, 1974–75, 1979–80
  - Runners-up: 1922–23, 2005–06
- League Cup
  - Runners-up: 1965–66, 1980–81
- FA Charity Shield
  - Winners: 1964 (shared)
  - Runners-up: 1975, 1980
- Football League War Cup
  - Winners: 1940

=== European ===
- European Cup Winners' Cup
  - Winners: 1964–65
  - Runners-up: 1975–76
- UEFA Conference League
  - Winners: 2022–23
- UEFA Intertoto Cup
  - Winners: 1999
- Anglo-Italian League Cup
  - Runners-up: 1975

=== International ===
- International Soccer League
  - Winners: 1963
- American Challenge Cup
  - Runners-up: 1963

=== Minor titles ===
- Southern League Division One: Highest placing: 3rd, 1912–13
- Southern League Division Two: 1898–99
  - London champions: 1898–99
- Western League: 1906–07
  - Section B champions: 1906–07
- London League: 1897–98, 1901–02
- London Challenge Cup
  - Winners: (9): 1924–25, 1925–26, 1929–30, 1946–47, 1948–49, 1952–53, 1956–57, 1967–68, 1968–69
    - Runners-up (5): 1912–13, 1932–33, 1954–55, 1957–58, 1958–59
- Southern Floodlit Cup: 1956
- Essex Professional Cup: 1951, 1955 (shared), 1959
- West Ham Charity Cup: 1896
- London Combination: 1916–17, runners-up: 1915–16 (Supplementary Tournament), 1917–18
- League South A runners-up: 1939–40
- League South C: runners-up: 1939–40
- Regional League South runners-up: 1940–41
- League South runners-up: 1943–44, 1944–45

=== Other awards ===
- BBC Sports Personality of the Year Team Award: 1965
- UNESCO Fair Play Trophy: 1966 (shared with 1860 Munich)
- Honorary Degree (awarded to the club) in 2009 by the University of East London

== Records and statistics ==
=== Attendance ===
- Record attendance: 62,478 vs Leeds United, Premier League, 21 May 2023
  - At the Boleyn Ground: 42,322 v Tottenham Hotspur, Division One, 17 October 1970
- Lowest league attendance: 4,373 v Doncaster Rovers, Division Two, 24 February 1955

=== Transfers ===
- Biggest transfer fee paid: £51.2 million to Lyon for Lucas Paquetá, 29 August 2022
- Biggest transfer fee received: £100 million from Arsenal for Declan Rice, 15 July 2023 (Note: Arsenal's transfer fee for Declan Rice may rise to £105 million depending on if performance-based criteria are met.)

=== Victories ===
- League:
- Premier League:
  - Home: 6–0 v Barnsley, 10 January 1998
  - Away: 5–0 v Derby County, 10 November 2007
- Division One:
  - Home: 8–0 v Sunderland, 19 October 1968
  - Away: 6–1 v Manchester City, 8 September 1962
- Division Two:
  - Home: 8–0 v Rotherham United, 8 March 1958
  - Away: 6–0 v Leicester City, 15 February 1923
- FA Cup:
  - Home: 8–1 v Chesterfield (round one), 10 January 1914
  - Away: 5–0 v Chatham Town (fifth qualifying round), 28 November 1903
- League Cup:
  - Home: 10–0 v Bury (round two second leg) (12–1 aggregate scoreline), 25 October 1983
  - Away: 5–1 v Cardiff City (semi-final second leg) (10–3 aggregate scoreline), 2 February 1966
  - Away: 5–1 v Walsall (round two), 13 September 1967
- European Cup Winners' Cup:
  - Home: 5–1 v Castilla CF (round one second leg) (6–4 aggregate scoreline), 1 October 1980
  - Away: 2–1 v Lausanne (quarter final second leg), (6–4 aggregate scoreline) 16 March 1965
- UEFA Cup/Europa League:
  - Home: 5–0 v Freiburg (round of 16 second leg), 14 March 2024
  - Away: 3–0 v Lyon (quarter final second leg), (4–1 aggregate score line) 14 April 2022

=== Defeats ===
- League:
- Premier League:
  - Home: 0–6 v Arsenal, 11 February 2024
  - Away: 0–6 v Everton, 8 May 1999
- Division One:
  - Home: 2–8 v Blackburn Rovers, 26 December 1963
  - Away: 0–7 v Sheffield Wednesday, 28 November 1959
- Division Two:
  - Away: 0–7 v Barnsley, 1 September 1919
- FA Cup:
  - Away: 0–6 v Manchester United (fourth round), 26 January 2003
- League Cup:
  - Away: 0–6 v Oldham Athletic (semi-final first leg), 14 February 1990
  - Away: 0–6 v Manchester City (semi-final first leg), 8 January 2014
- European Cup Winners' Cup:
  - Home: 1–4 v Dinamo Tbilisi (quarter final first leg) (2–4 aggregate scoreline), 4 March 1981
  - Away: 2–4 v FC Den Haag (quarter final first leg) (5–5 aggregate scoreline, West Ham won on away goals), 3 March 1976
  - Neutral: 2–4 v Anderlecht (Final), 5 May 1976
- UEFA Cup:
  - Home: 0–1 v Palermo (round one first leg), 14 September 2006
  - Away: 0–3 v Palermo (round one second leg), 28 September 2006

=== Club league highs and lows ===
Highest league finish

- 3rd in First Division (level 1), 1985–86

- Home:
  - Most:
  - Most home wins: 19 (1980–81)
  - Most home draws: 10 (1981–82)
  - Most home defeats: 10 (1988–89)
  - Most home goals scored: 59 (1958–59)
  - Most home goals conceded: 44 (1930–31)
  - Fewest:
  - Fewest home wins: 3 (1988–89)
  - Fewest home draws: 1 (1934–35, 1980–81)
  - Fewest home defeats: 1 (1957–58, 1980–81)
  - Fewest home goals scored: 19 (1988–89)
  - Fewest home goals conceded: 11 (1920–21, 1922–23)

- Away:
  - Most:
  - Most away wins: 13 (2011–12)
  - Most away draws: 10 (1968–69)
  - Most away defeats: 17 (1932–33)
  - Most away goals scored: 45 (1957–58)
  - Most away goals conceded: 70 (1931–32)
  - Fewest:
  - Fewest away wins: 1 (1925–26, 1932–33, 1937–38, 1960–61, 2009–10)
  - Fewest away draws: 1 (1982–83)
  - Fewest away defeats: 3 (1980–81)
  - Fewest away goals scored: 12 (1996–97)
  - Fewest away goals conceded: 16 (1990–91)

- Total:
  - Most:
  - Most wins: 28 (1980–81)
  - Most draws: 18 (1968–69)
  - Most defeats: 23 (1931–32)
  - Most goals scored: 101 (1957–58)
  - Most goals conceded: 107 (1931–32)
  - Fewest:
  - Fewest wins: 7 (2010–11)
  - Fewest draws: 4 (1934–35, 1964–65, 1982–83)
  - Fewest defeats: 4 (1980–81)
  - Fewest goals scored: 37 (1988–89, 1991–92)
  - Fewest goals conceded: 29 (1980–81)

=== Club goal records ===
- Most league goals in a season:
  - 101, Division Two (1957–58)
- Top league scorer in a season:
  - Vic Watson (42) Div. One (1929–30)
- Top scorer in a season:
  - Vic Watson (50) Div. One (1929–30)
- Most goals in one match:
  - Vic Watson (6) v Leeds United (h) 9 February 1929
  - Geoff Hurst (6) v Sunderland (h) 19 October 1968

Follow link to Official West Ham United Records Page

=== Player records ===
Appearances

1. 799 Billy Bonds (1967–88)
2. 670 Frank Lampard Sr. (1967–85)
3. 644 Bobby Moore (1958–74)
4. 643 Trevor Brooking (1967–84)
5. 600 Alvin Martin (1977–96)
6. 550 Mark Noble (2004–22)
7. 548 Jimmy Ruffell (1921–37)
8. 505 Steve Potts (1985–02)
9. 505 Vic Watson (1920–35)
10. 502 Geoff Hurst (1959–72)

Goals

1. 326 Vic Watson (1920–35)
2. 252 Geoff Hurst (1959–72)
3. 166 John Dick (1953–63)
4. 166 Jimmy Ruffell (1921–37)
5. 146 Tony Cottee (1983–88), (1994–96)
6. 107 Johnny Byrne (1961–67)
7. 104 Pop Robson (1970–74), (1976–79)
8. 102 Trevor Brooking (1967–84)
9. 100 Malcolm Musgrove (1953–63)
10. 100 Martin Peters (1962–70)

== In popular culture ==
- In the British sitcom Till Death Us Do Part and its follow-on and spin-off series Till Death... and In Sickness and in Health the character Alf Garnett's biggest passion in life was his local football team West Ham United and featured throughout the run of the show. There were a number of episodes that focused on Alfs support of West Ham such as Season 4's Episode 5 "Up The Hammers", and in particular his idolising of club heroes such as Bobby Moore and Martin Peters who both feature in the same episode.
- The 2022 action film Bullet Train features two British assassins – Tangerine and Lemon – who are diehard West Ham United fans. The film features several renditions of the club's theme song, including one featuring Engelbert Humperdinck as the singer.

== Bibliography ==
- Belton, Brian (2007). "BROWN OUT": The Biography of West Ham Chairmen, Terence Brown. Pennant Publishing Ltd. ISBN 978-1-906015-11-4.
- Belton, Brian (2006). West Ham United Miscellany. Pennant Books. ISBN 978-0-9550394-4-7.
- Blows, Kirk & Hogg, Tony (2000). The Essential History of West Ham United. Headline. ISBN 978-0-7472-7036-2.
- Hellier, John & Leatherdale, Clive (2000). West Ham United: The Elite Era – A Complete Record. Desert Island. ISBN 978-1-874287-31-5.
- Hogg, Tony (2005). Who's Who of West Ham United. Profile Sports Media. ISBN 978-1-903135-50-1.
- Kerrigan, Colm (1997). Gatling Gun George Hilsdon. Football Lives. ISBN 978-0-9530718-0-7.
- Korr, Charles (1986). West Ham United: the Making of a Football Club. University of Illinois Press. ISBN 978-0-252-01405-5.
- Nawrat, Chris & Hutchings, Steve (1996). The Sunday Times Illustrated History of Football. Hamlyn. ISBN 978-1-85613-341-8.
- Pickering, David (1994). The Cassell Soccer Companion. Cassell. ISBN 978-0-304-34231-0.
- Redknapp, Harry; Derek McGovern (1998). Harry Redknapp – My Autobiography. HarperCollins. ISBN 978-0-00-218872-2.
- Ward, Adam & Smith, Dave (2003). The Official West Ham United Dream Team. Hamlyn. ISBN 978-0-600-60835-6.
