= Tripp Smith =

American investment executive

- Born: J. Albert Smith; 1965 (age 60–61); Indianapolis, U.S.
- Education: University of Notre Dame
- Occupation: Business executive
- Spouse: Sheila
- Children: 4

J. Albert "Tripp" Smith (born 1965 or 1966) is an American investment executive who was the co-founder of GSO Capital Partners, the credit investment platform of The Blackstone Group. Since 2017, he has been part owner of the English football club West Ham United.

== Early life and education ==
Smith attended Brebeuf Jesuit Preparatory School in Indianapolis and graduated in 1987 from the University of Notre Dame.

== Career ==
With two colleagues from Donaldson, Lufkin & Jenrette and subsequently Credit Suisse First Boston, Bennett Goodman and Doug Ostrover, Smith founded GSO Capital Partners in 2005; its name derives from their initials. He continued at GSO after its acquisition by Blackstone in 2008, serving as managing director and leaving in 2018. In 2019, he started Iron Park Capital Partners.

He is a non-executive director of English football club West Ham United since purchasing a 10% stake in 2017. In 2020, there were rumors that he was forming a consortium to purchase a controlling interest in the club. In 2021, following Daniel Křetínský's purchase of a 27% stake in West Ham, Smith's shares were reduced to 8%.

== Personal life ==
Tripp and his wife, Sheila, have four children.
