= Johnny Stewart (footballer, born 1872) =

English footballer

Personal information
- Date of birth: 1872
- Place of birth: Newcastle-upon-Tyne, England
- Position: Half back

Senior career*
Years	Team	Apps	(Gls)
1892–1893	Old St Luke's		
1893–1894	Old Castle Swifts		
1895–1896	Thames Ironworks	0	(0)
- * Club domestic league appearances and goals

Johnny Stewart (1872- unknown) was an English association footballer who played as a half back.

Born in Newcastle-upon-Tyne, Stewart began his footballing career with Old St Luke's. When the club was amalgamated into Old Castle Swifts he continued to play for them until their demise in 1895. A boilermaker by trade, Stewart worked for Thames Ironworks and Shipbuilding Company and played for their works team, Thames Ironworks upon their creation in 1895. One of his first appearances was against a more experienced Chatham side in the FA Cup, which Chatham won 5–0. He did play all the games in the 1895–96 West Ham Charity Cup, including three games against Barking, gaining a winner's medal. His last game for the club was against Leyton in an Essex Senior Cup tie in 1896.
