= St Luke's F.C. (England) =

Defunct association football club in England

St Luke's
- Full name: St Luke's Football Club
- Nickname(s): Saints
- Founded: 1880s
- Dissolved: January 1897
- Ground: Beckton Road, Canning Town

St Luke's Football Club was a football club based in Canning Town, England.

== History ==
St Luke's were formed in the 1880s. In 1895, St Luke's entered the South Essex League, finishing second. In 1896–97, St Luke's entered the FA Cup, losing 3–1 against Ilford at home in the first qualifying round. In January 1897, St Luke's resigned from the South Essex League, dissolving in the process.

== Ground ==
St Luke's played on Beckton Road in Canning Town. The ground hosted the second replay of the 1896 West Ham Charity Cup final, where 4,000 spectators witnessed Thames Ironworks win their first trophy after beating Barking Woodville 1–0.

== Records ==
- Best FA Cup performance: First qualifying round, 1896–97
