= West Ham Charity Cup =

Defunct English football tournament

- Founded: 1887
- Abolished: 1931; 95 years ago
- Region: Essex
- Last champions: Leyton reserves (2nd title)
- Most championships: Clapton (8 titles)

The West Ham Charity Cup was an annual amateur football tournament which was contested by teams from West Ham and the surrounding area, an area of Essex that is now part of London. Only players that lived locally were eligible to compete.

== History ==
The competition was founded as the West Ham Hospital Cup in 1885 by George Hay, Mayor of the County Borough of West Ham, to raise funds for the local hospital, and ran until 1931.

In March 1893, Castle Swifts faced Barking Woodville in the final, held at Clapton's Old Spotted Dog Ground in Upton Lane. The Swifts were two goals down before coming back to win the tie 4–2, with the goals coming from outside-right Grundy, inside-forwards Mitchell and Taylor and an own goal. A local newspaper made the following account of the final:

"After the match the crowd made a rush to the Grand Stand where the Mayor presented the large silver cup to the captain of the Castle Swifts and Mr. Comerford of the Cup Committee announced that ‘the medals had not yet come to hand, but they would be forwarded to the winners as soon as possible’. With that the captain was lifted on to the shoulders of several of his followers and carried from the ground."

Three of the teams in the 1895–96 tournament were Barking, Park Grove and Thames Ironworks, who would later become West Ham United. In a semi-final in Plaistow, Thames Ironworks beat Park Grove 1–0. Park Grove protested a technicality and forced a replay at Beckton Road, which The Ironworks won 3–0. Thames Ironworks faced Barking in the final on 21 March 1896 at the Old Spotted Dog Ground, drawing 2–2. They rematched a week later, and again drew, 0–0. The final was replayed a final time on 20 April 1896 and the Irons won 1–0.

Three of the teams in the 1896–97 tournament were Manor Park, West Ham Garfield and the defending champions, Thames Ironworks, who beat Manor Park in the semi-final, and lost the 20 March 1897 final 0–1 to Garfield. Thanes Ironworks later became West Ham United.

In April 1902, Clapton Orient won the tournament by beating Clapton 1–0.

Clapton is the most successful club, having won the competition eight times.

The tournament was not held between 1915 and 1918.

== Finals ==
This section lists every final of the competition played since 1887, the winners, the runners-up, and the result.

=== Key ===
Match went to a replay
Match went to extra time
Shared trophy

Season	Winners	Result	Runner-up	Venue	Notes	Ref.
1887–88	Ilford	3–0	Woodville	Old Spotted Dog Ground		
1888–89	Ilford	1–1	Clapton	Old Spotted Dog Ground	Original final.	
1888–89	Ilford	2–1	Clapton	Old Spotted Dog Ground	Replay.	
1889–90	Clapton	1–0	Ilford	Old Spotted Dog Ground		
1890–91	Ilford	2–1	Clapton	Old Spotted Dog Ground		
1891–92	Ilford	4–0	Upton Park	Old Spotted Dog Ground		
1892–93	Castle Swifts	4–2	Woodville	Old Spotted Dog Ground		
1893–94	Woodville	1–0	St Luke's			
1894–95	Woodville	4–2	St Luke's	Old Spotted Dog Ground		
1895–96	Thames Ironworks	2–2	Barking	Old Spotted Dog Ground	Original final.	
1895–96	Thames Ironworks	0–0	Barking	Old Spotted Dog Ground	Replay.	
1895–96	Thames Ironworks	1–0	Barking	Beckton Road	Second replay.	
1896–97	West Ham Garfield	1–0	Thames Ironworks	Old Spotted Dog Ground		
1897–98	West Ham Garfield	1–0	Ilford			
1898–99	Ilford	4–0	West Ham Garfield	Old Spotted Dog Ground		
1899–1900	Woodford	3–0	Ilford	Granleigh Road		
1900–01	Woodford	1–0	Leyton			
1901–02	Clapton Orient	1–0	Clapton	Old Spotted Dog Ground		
1902–03	Clapton	2–0	Clapton Orient	Old Spotted Dog Ground	After extra-time.	
1903–04	Clapton	3–0	Woodford	Old Spotted Dog Ground		
1904–05	Romford	2–0	Clapton	Old Spotted Dog Ground		
1905–06	Wanstead	2–0	Clapton	Old Spotted Dog Ground		
1906–07	Clapton	2–1	Leytonstone	Old Spotted Dog Ground		
1907–08	Clapton	4–3	Romford	Old Spotted Dog Ground	After extra-time.	
1908–09	Romford	4–1	Leytonstone	Old Spotted Dog Ground		
1909–10	Leytonstone	4–0	Romford United			
1910–11	Romford United	3–2	Leytonstone	Old Spotted Dog Ground		
1911–12	Custom House	2–0	Romford United	Old Spotted Dog Ground		
1912–13	Leytonstone	3–2	Custom House	Old Spotted Dog Ground		
1913–14	Leytonstone	4–1	Clapton	Old Spotted Dog Ground		
1914–15	Leytonstone	1–0	Clapton reserves	Old Spotted Dog Ground		
1915–1918	No competition due to World War I.					
1918–19	Leytonstone	–	Clapton	Granleigh Road	(Note: Leytonstone mentioned as "Holders" in 1919–20 report.)	
1919–20	Barking Town	4–1	Leytonstone	Granleigh Road		
1920–21	Barking Town	6–1	Leytonstone	Old Spotted Dog Ground		
1921–22	Barking Town	2–1	Great Eastern Railway	Old Spotted Dog Ground		
1922–23	Custom House	1–0	Barking Town	Old Spotted Dog Ground		
1923–24	Clapton	4–1	Custom House	Old Spotted Dog Ground	(Note: Postponed until 6 September 1924.)	
1924–25	Clapton	2–1	Barking Town	Old Spotted Dog Ground	(Note: Postponed until at least 22 September 1925.)	
1925–26	Clapton; Barking Town	0–0			Trophy shared. (Note: Postponed until October 1926.)	
1926–27						
1927–28						
1928–29	Leytonstone	3–1	Custom House		(Note: Played on 16 September 1929.)	
1929–30	Leyton	3–0	Leytonstone		(Note: Played on 1 September 1930.)	
1930–31	Leyton reserves	1–0	Clapton reserves	Leyton Stadium	(Note: Played on 3 October 1931.)	

== Bibliography ==
- Blows, Kirk; Hogg, Tony (2000). The Essential History of West Ham United. Headline. ISBN 0-7472-7036-8.
- Powles, John (2005). Iron in the Blood. Nottingham: Soccerdata. ISBN 1-899468-22-6.
