= 1897–98 Tottenham Hotspur F.C. season =

English football club season

Tottenham Hotspur
1897–98 season
- Manager: John Cameron
- Stadium: Northumberland Park
- Southern League: 3rd
- United League: 2nd
- FA Cup: 4th Qualifying Round
- Top goalscorer: Bill Joyce (16)

The 1897–98 English football season was Tottenham Hotspur's second season in professional football. It was the club's and the 15th year since their inception. In the season Tottenham played in two leagues. The main campaign was played in the Southern Football League with midweek games in the United League. They also competed the FA Cup qualifying rounds. The first game was a 7–0 win at home against 2nd Coldstream Guards, the second was a 4–3 loss to Luton Town.

In the United League Tottenham also played Luton twice, Luton won the first game 5–0 and in the second game which finished in a draw 2–2 was described as a dirty game by the Weekly Herald. The referee was classed as being poor, penalising the wrong players, not noticing a handball goal and not being able to handle what was called "a dirty game". This led to some Tottenham supporters using foul language and some attacks on Luton players. Luton complained to the Football Association about the conduct at Northumberland Park, the result was that Tottenham had to play their next home game at Millwall's ground.

== Squad ==
Note: Flags indicate national team as defined under FIFA eligibility rules; some limited exceptions apply. Players may hold more than one non-FIFA nationality.

Pos.	Nation	Player
GK	ENG	Charles Ambler
GK	SCO	Joseph Cullen
DF	SCO	Edwin Downie
DF	SCO	Alex Hall
DF	ENG	Stanley Briggs
DF	ENG	Joe Knowles
DF	ENG	Lycurgus Burrows
DF	SCO	Jack Montgomary
MF	ENG	William Crump

Pos.	Nation	Player
MF	WAL	Jack Jones
MF	SCO	Johnny Madden
MF	SCO	Robert Tannahill
MF	SCO	Robert Stormont
FW	ENG	Thomas Meade
FW	SCO	Jimmy Davidson
FW	SCO	David Black
FW	SCO	Bill Joyce
FW	SCO	Jimmy Hartley

== Transfers ==
=== In ===
Date from	Position	Nationality	Name	From	Fee	Ref.
May 1897	Forward	(Scotland)	James Davidson	Burnley	Unknown	
May 1897	Full back	(England)	Joe Knowles	Sunderland	Unknown	

=== Out ===
Date from	Position	Nationality	Name	To	Fee	Ref.
December 1897	Full back	(England)	Lycurgus Burrows	Sheffield United	Unknown	

== Competitions ==
=== Southern League ===
==== Table ====
Pos	Team	Pld	W	D	L	GF	GA	GR	Pts
1	Southampton	22	18	1	3	53	18	2.944	37
2	Bristol City	22	13	7	2	67	33	2.030	33
3	Tottenham Hotspur	22	12	4	6	52	31	1.677	28
4	Chatham Town	22	12	4	6	50	34	1.471	28
5	Reading	22	8	7	7	39	31	1.258	23

Rules for classification: The system of using goal average to separate two teams tied on points was used until the 1976-77 season. The points system: 2 points for a win, 1 point for a draw and 0 points for losing.

==== Results ====
4 September 1897 1	Sheppey United	1–1	Tottenham Hotspur	Isle of Sheppey, Kent
				Stadium: Botany Road

18 September 1897 2	Tottenham Hotspur	2–0	Southampton	Tottenham, London
				Stadium: Northumberland Park

25 September 1897 3	Tottenham Hotspur	7–0	Millwall	Tottenham, London
				Stadium: Northumberland Park

2 October 1897 4	New Brompton	1–0	Tottenham Hotspur	Gillingham, Kent
				Stadium: Priestfield Stadium

9 October 1897 5	Tottenham Hotspur	2–0	Gravesend United	Tottenham, London
				Stadium: Northumberland Park

23 October 1897 6	Southampton	4–1	Tottenham Hotspur	Southampton
				Stadium: County Ground

6 November 1897 7	Reading	3–3	Tottenham Hotspur	Reading
				Stadium: Cricket Ground

13 November 1897 8	Tottenham Hotspur	2–2	Bristol City	Tottenham, London
				Stadium: Northumberland Park

27 November 1897 9	Bristol City	3–1	Tottenham Hotspur	Bristol
				Stadium: St John's Lane

18 December 1897 10	Wolverton	1–2	Tottenham Hotspur	Wolverton

15 January 1898 11	Tottenham Hotspur	4–0	Northfleet	Tottenham, London
				Stadium: Northumberland Park

22 January 1898 12	Tottenham Hotspur	7–1	Wolverton	Tottenham, London
				Stadium: Northumberland Park

29 January 1898 13	Chatham	4–2	Tottenham Hotspur	Chatham, Kent

5 February 1898 14	Swindon Town	3–0	Tottenham Hotspur	Swindon, Wiltshire
				Stadium: County Ground

19 February 1898 15	Northfleet	1–3	Tottenham Hotspur	Northfleet, Kent

26 February 1898 16	Tottenham Hotspur	1–1	Reading	Millwall, London (Note: The 26 February 1898 Southern League game was played at Millwall due to suspension of Northumberland Park after attacks on Luton players. Source:Tottenham Hotspur The Official Illustrated History 1882–1995)

5 March 1898 17	Gravesend United	1–2	Tottenham Hotspur	Gravesend, Kent
				Stadium: Overcliffe Ground

19 March 1898 18	Tottenham Hotspur	4–0	Sheppey United	Tottenham, London
				Stadium: Northumberland Park

2 April 1898 19	Tottenham Hotspur	3–1	New Brompton	Tottenham, London
				Stadium: Northumberland Park

9 April 1898 20	Tottenham Hotspur	2–1	Chatham	Tottenham, London
				Stadium: Northumberland Park

11 April 1898 21	Tottenham Hotspur	2–0	Swindon Town	Tottenham, London
				Stadium: Northumberland Park

16 April 1898 22	Millwall	3–1	Tottenham Hotspur	Isle of Dogs, London
				Stadium: The Athletic Grounds

=== United League ===
==== Table ====
Pos	Club	P	W	D	L	F	A	Pts
1	Luton Town	16	13	2	1	49	11	28
2	Tottenham Hotspur	16	8	5	3	40	21	21
3	Woolwich Arsenal	16	8	5	3	35	24	21
4	Kettering	16	8	1	6	28	25	19
5	Rushden Town	16	9	1	8	25	42	15
6	Southampton	16	6	3	7	23	24	12
7	Millwall	16	4	4	8	27	27	12
8	Wellingborough	16	3	3	10	16	42	9
9	Loughborough	16	1	2	13	8	42	4

==== Results ====
16 September 1897 1	Tottenham Hotspur	1–1	Kettering Town	Tottenham, London
				Stadium: Northumberland Park

29 September 1897 2	Loughborough	1–2	Tottenham Hotspur	Loughborough, Leicestershire
				Stadium: Athletic Ground

11 October 1897 3	Luton Town	5–0	Tottenham Hotspur	Luton, Bedfordshire
				Stadium: Dunstable Road

16 October 1897 4	Millwall	0–0	Tottenham Hotspur	Isle of Dogs, London
				Stadium: The Athletic Grounds

4 December 1897 5	Tottenham Hotspur	5–0	Wellingborough	Tottenham, London
				Stadium: Northumberland Park

25 December 1897 6	Tottenham Hotspur	3–2	Woolwich Arsenal	Tottenham, London
				Stadium: Northumberland Park

1 January 1898 7	Rushden Town	5–2	Tottenham Hotspur	Rushden, Northamptonshire
				Stadium: Hayden Road

8 January 1898 8	Tottenham Hotspur	3–1	Rushden Town	Tottenham, London
				Stadium: Northumberland Park

10 January 1898 9	Kettering Town	4–2	Tottenham Hotspur	Kettering, Northamptonshire
				Stadium: Rockingham Road

19 January 1898 10	Southampton	2–2	Tottenham Hotspur	Southampton, Hampshire
				Stadium: County Ground

3 February 1898 11	Tottenham Hotspur	2–2	Luton Town	Tottenham, London
				Stadium: Northumberland Park

12 March 1898 12	Tottenham Hotspur	3–2	Millwall	Tottenham, London
				Stadium: Northumberland Park

17 March 1898 13	Tottenham Hotspur	5–0	Loughborough	Tottenham, London
				Stadium: Northumberland Park

24 March 1898 14	Tottenham Hotspur	7–0	Southampton	Tottenham, London
				Stadium: Northumberland Park

8 April 1898 15	Woolwich Arsenal	1–0	Tottenham Hotspur	Plumstead, London
				Stadium: Manor Ground

23 April 1898 16	Wellingborough Town	2–2	Tottenham Hotspur	Wellingborough, London
				Stadium: Bassett's Close

=== FA Cup ===
==== Results ====
30 October 1897 Q3	Tottenham Hotspur	7–0	2nd Coldstream Guards	Tottenham, London
	Black; Crump; Joyce			Stadium: Northumberland Park; Attendance: 4,000

20 November 1897 Q4	Tottenham Hotspur	3–4	Luton Town	Tottenham, London
	Black; Joyce			Stadium: Northumberland Park; Attendance: 12,000

== Bibliography ==
- Soar, Phil (1995). Tottenham Hotspur The Official Illustrated History 1882–1995. Hamlyn. ISBN 0-600-58706-1.
- Goodwin, Bob (1992). The Spurs Alphabet. ACL & Polar Publishing (UK) Ltd. ISBN 0-9514862-8-4.
