= 1896–97 Tottenham Hotspur F.C. season =

English football club season

Tottenham Hotspur
1896–97 season
- Stadium: Northumberland Park
- Southern League: 4th
- United League: 8th
- FA Cup: Fifth Qualifying Round
- Top goalscorer: Robert Clements (10)

The 1897–98 English football season was Tottenham Hotspur's first season in professional football. Having turned professional, and they competed in two leagues during the season. The Southern League and the United League. In the FA Cup, Tottenham played three qualifying games and in the third, they went away to Luton, where they lost 3–0. There were also a total of 26 recorded friendly games played that season.

Tottenham turned professional in order to join the Football League but were rejected after coming bottom of a poll with just two votes. Instead, the club were then elected to the Southern League.

== Squad ==
Note: Flags indicate national team as defined under FIFA eligibility rules; some limited exceptions apply. Players may hold more than one non-FIFA nationality.

Pos.	Nation	Player
GK	ENG	Charles Ambler
GK	ENG	Thomas Hatfield
DF		Jimmy Allen
DF	SCO	James Mair
DF	ENG	William Almond
DF	ENG	Stanley Briggs
DF	ENG	Lycurgus Burrows
DF		James Devlin
DF	ENG	E Markham
-		James Collins
MF	ENG	William Crump

Pos.	Nation	Player
MF	ENG	Charles Lanham
FW	ENG	Ralph McElhaney
FW		James Milliken
DF	SCO	Jack Montgomary
FW	ENG	Willie Newbigging
-		Ernie Payne
FW	SCO	Robertson
FW		Frank Wilson
FW	SCO	Billy Fleming
FW	ENG	Robert Clements

== Competitions ==
=== United League ===
==== Table ====
Pos	Team	Pld	W	D	L	GF	GA	GD	Pts
4	Loughborough	14	6	1	7	29	31	−2	13
5	Rushden Town	14	6	1	7	25	42	−17	13
6	Kettering	14	4	4	6	23	24	−1	12
7	Wellingborough	14	3	3	8	17	39	−22	9
8	Tottenham Hotspur	14	1	4	9	25	34	−9	6

==== Results ====
19 September 1896 1	Millwall Athletic	6–5	Tottenham Hotspur

2 November 1896 2	Rushden Town	2–0	Tottenham Hotspur

9 November 1896 3	Woolwich Arsenal	2–1	Tottenham Hotspur

20 January 1897 4	Wellingborough	2–2	Tottenham Hotspur

25 February 1897 5	Tottenham Hotspur	2–2	Woolwich Arsenal

27 February 1897 6	Tottenham Hotspur	1–2	Loughborough

4 March 1897 7	Tottenham Hotspur	5–1	Rushden Town

13 March 1897 8	Tottenham Hotspur	1–2	Luton Town

15 March 1897 9	Kettering Town	1–1	Tottenham Hotspur

3 April 1897 10	Tottenham Hotspur	1–3	Millwall Athletic

10 April 1897 11	Luton Town	2–1	Tottenham Hotspur

17 April 1897 12	Tottenham Hotspur	1–1	Kettering Town

19 April 1897 13	Tottenham Hotspur	1–1	Wellingborough

24 April 1897 14	Loughborough	3–2	Tottenham Hotspur

=== Southern League ===
==== League table ====
Pos	Team	Pld	W	D	L	GF	GA	GAv	Pts
2	Millwall Athletic	20	13	5	2	63	24	2.625	31
3	Chatham Town	20	13	1	6	54	29	1.862	27
4	Tottenham Hotspur	20	9	4	7	43	29	1.483	22
5	Gravesend United	20	9	4	7	35	34	1.029	22
6	Swindon Town	20	8	3	9	33	37	0.892	19

Rules for classification: The system of using goal average to separate two teams tied on points was used until the 1976-77 season. The points system: 2 points for a win, 1 point for a draw and 0 points for losing.

==== Results ====
5 September 1896 1	Sheppey United	3–3	Tottenham Hotspur	Isle of Sheppey, Kent
				Stadium: Botany Road

12 September 1896 2	Wolverton	0–1	Tottenham Hotspur	Wolverton

3 October 1896 3	Gravesend United	1–3	Tottenham Hotspur	Gravesend, Kent
				Stadium: Overcliffe Ground

10 October 1896 4	Tottenham Hotspur	2–3	Chatham	Northumberland Park, London

17 October 1896 5	Tottenham Hotspur	4–0	Gravesend United	Northumberland Park, London

17 October 1896 6	Tottenham Hotspur	2–1; Game was void after Royal Ordnance resigned from the league.	Royal Ordnance	Northumberland Park, London

31 October 1896 7	Chatham	1–2	Tottenham Hotspur	Kent

7 November 1896 8	Tottenham Hotspur	3–2	Sheppey United	Northumberland Park, London

14 November 1896 9	Tottenham Hotspur	3–1	Swindon Town	Northumberland Park, London

28 November 1896 10	Tottenham Hotspur	1–3	Millwall Athletic	Northumberland Park, London

5 December 1896 11	Reading	2–1	Tottenham Hotspur	Reading, Berkshire
				Stadium: Elm Park

25 December 1896 12	Millwall Athletic	4–0	Tottenham Hotspur	Isle of Dogs, London
				Stadium: The Athletic Grounds

9 January 1897 13	Swindon Town	1–0	Tottenham Hotspur	Swindon
				Stadium: County Ground

13 February 1897 14	Tottenham Hotspur	5–0	Northfleet United	Northumberland Park, London

20 February 1897 15	New Brompton	2–1	Tottenham Hotspur	Gillingham, Kent
				Stadium: Priestfield Road

6 March 1897 16	Northfleet United	2–0	Tottenham Hotspur	Northfleet, Kent
				Stadium: Stonebridge Road

20 March 1897 17	Tottenham Hotspur	4–4	Reading	Northumberland Park, London

27 March 1897 18	Tottenham Hotspur	6–0	New Brompton	Northumberland Park, London

29 March 1897 19	Southampton	1–1	Tottenham Hotspur	Southampton
				Stadium: County Ground

1 April 1897 20	Tottenham Hotspur	2–0	Wolverton	Northumberland Park, London

8 April 1897 21	Tottenham Hotspur	2–2	Southampton	Northumberland Park, London

=== FA Cup ===
12 December 1896 3Q	Tottenham Hotspur	4–0	Old St. Stephens	Northumberland Park, London
	Clements; Payne			Attendance: 2,000

6 January 1897 4Q	Tottenham Hotspur	6–0	Maidenhead	Northumberland Park, London
	McElhaney; Newbigging; Payne; Crump			Attendance: 2,000

16 January 1897 5Q	Luton Town	3–0	Tottenham Hotspur	Luton
				Attendance: 5,000
