= 2015–16 National League =

National League
- Season: 2015–16

The 2015–16 National League season (known as the Vanarama National League for sponsorship reasons) was the first season under the new title of National League, the twelfth season consisting of three divisions and the thirty-seventh season overall.

The National League covers the top two levels of Non-League football in England. The National League is the fifth highest level of the overall pyramid, while the National League North and National League South exist at the sixth level. The top team and the winner of the play-off of the Premier division will be promoted to League Two, while the bottom four are relegated to the North or South divisions. The champions of the North and South divisions will be promoted to the Premier division, alongside the play-off winners from each division. The bottom three in each of the North and South divisions are relegated to the premier divisions of the Northern Premier League, Isthmian League or Southern League.

On 6 April 2015, it was announced that as of the 2015–16 season the League was to undergo a name change from the Football Conference to the National League. As well as the name change, the league's logo was re-designed and the league's broadcaster BT Sport signed a new three-year contract; the structure of the league and the title sponsor Vanarama remained the same.

== National League ==
National League
- Season: 2015–16
- Champions: Cheltenham Town (2nd divisional title)
- Promoted: Cheltenham Town; Grimsby Town
- Relegated: Altrincham; FC Halifax Town; Kidderminster Harriers; Welling United
- Top goalscorer: (Republic of Ireland) Pádraig Amond, Grimsby Town and (England) Dan Holman, Cheltenham Town (30 goals)
- Biggest home win: Grimsby Town 7–0 FC Halifax Town
- Biggest away win: FC Halifax Town 1–7 Cheltenham Town
- Highest scoring: Torquay United 3–7 Bromley; Chester 8–2 Aldershot Town
- Longest winning run: Forest Green Rovers and Cheltenham Town (9 matches)
- Longest unbeaten run: Cheltenham Town (21 matches)
- Longest winless run: Kidderminster Harriers (18 matches)
- Highest attendance: 7,650 Grimsby Town v Lincoln City
- Lowest attendance: 484 Braintree Town v Wrexham
- Average attendance: 5,214 Tranmere Rovers

=== Promotion and relegation ===
Teams promoted from 2014–15 Conference North

- Barrow (League champions)
- Guiseley (Play-off winners)

Teams promoted from 2014–15 Conference South

- Bromley (League champions)
- Boreham Wood (Play-off winners)

Teams relegated from 2014–15 League Two

- Cheltenham Town
- Tranmere Rovers

=== Stadia and locations ===
Locations of the 2015–16 National League clubs

Team	Stadium	Capacity
Aldershot Town	Recreation Ground	7,100
Altrincham	Moss Lane	6,085
Barrow	Holker Street	5,000
Boreham Wood	Meadow Park	4,502
Braintree Town	Cressing Road	4,145
Bromley	Hayes Lane	5,000
Cheltenham Town	Whaddon Road	7,066
Chester	Deva Stadium	6,000
Dover Athletic	Crabble Athletic Ground	6,500
Eastleigh	Ten Acres	5,200
FC Halifax Town	The Shay	14,061
Forest Green Rovers	The New Lawn	5,147
Gateshead	Gateshead International Stadium	10,000
Grimsby Town	Blundell Park	9,062
Guiseley	Nethermoor Park	3,000
Kidderminster Harriers	Aggborough Stadium	6,238
Lincoln City	Sincil Bank	10,120
Macclesfield Town	Moss Rose	6,355
Southport	Haig Avenue	6,008
Torquay United	Plainmoor	6,500
Tranmere Rovers	Prenton Park	16,789
Welling United	Park View Road	4,000
Woking	Kingfield Stadium	6,036
Wrexham	Racecourse Ground	10,771

=== League table ===
Pos	Team	Pld	W	D	L	GF	GA	GD	Pts	Promotion, qualification or relegation
1	Cheltenham Town (C, P)	46	30	11	5	87	30	+57	101	Promotion to EFL League Two
2	Forest Green Rovers	46	26	11	9	69	42	+27	89	Qualification for the National League play-offs
3	Braintree Town	46	23	12	11	56	38	+18	81	Qualification for the National League play-offs
4	Grimsby Town (O, P)	46	22	14	10	82	45	+37	80	Qualification for the National League play-offs
5	Dover Athletic	46	23	11	12	75	53	+22	80	Qualification for the National League play-offs
6	Tranmere Rovers	46	22	12	12	61	44	+17	78	
7	Eastleigh	46	21	12	13	64	53	+11	75	
8	Wrexham	46	20	9	17	71	56	+15	69	
9	Gateshead	46	19	10	17	59	70	−11	67	
10	Macclesfield Town	46	19	9	18	60	48	+12	66	
11	Barrow	46	17	14	15	64	71	−7	65	
12	Woking	46	17	10	19	71	68	+3	61	
13	Lincoln City	46	16	13	17	69	68	+1	61	
14	Bromley	46	17	9	20	67	72	−5	60	
15	Aldershot Town	46	16	8	22	54	72	−18	56	
16	Southport	46	14	13	19	52	65	−13	55	
17	Chester	46	14	12	20	67	71	−4	54	
18	Torquay United	46	13	12	21	54	76	−22	51	
19	Boreham Wood	46	12	14	20	44	49	−5	50	
20	Guiseley	46	11	16	19	47	70	−23	49	
21	FC Halifax Town (R)	46	12	12	22	55	82	−27	48	Relegation to National League North
22	Altrincham (R)	46	10	14	22	48	73	−25	44	Relegation to National League North
23	Kidderminster Harriers (R)	46	9	13	24	49	71	−22	40	Relegation to National League North
24	Welling United (R)	46	8	11	27	35	73	−38	35	Relegation to National League South

Rules for classification: 1) Points; 2) Goal difference; 3) Number of goals scored
(C) Champions; (O) Play-off winners; (P) Promoted; (R) Relegated

==== Play-offs ====
Semi-finals
2	Forest Green Rovers	1	1	2
5	Dover Athletic	0	1	1
3	Braintree Town	1	0	1
4	Grimsby Town (a.e.t.)	0	2	2

Final
2	Forest Green Rovers	1
4	Grimsby Town	3

==== First leg ====
4 May 2016	Dover Athletic	0–1	Forest Green Rovers	Crabble Athletic Ground, River
19:00		BBC Report	Williams 35'	Attendance: 2,071; Referee: Adrian Holmes

5 May 2016	Grimsby Town	0–1	Braintree Town	Blundell Park, Cleethorpes
19:00		BBC Report	Davis 53' (pen.)	Attendance: 5,271; Referee: John Brooks

==== Second leg ====
7 May 2016	Forest Green Rovers	1–1 (2–1 agg.)	Dover Athletic	The New Lawn, Nailsworth
19:30	Marsh-Brown 54'	BBC Report	Miller 49'	Attendance: 2,755; Referee: Michael Salisbury

8 May 2016	Braintree Town	0–2 (a.e.t.) (1–2 agg.)	Grimsby Town	Cressing Road, Braintree
15:00		BBC Report	Amond 75' (pen.); Bogle 110'	Attendance: 3,102; Referee: Simon Bennett

==== Final ====
15 May 2016	Forest Green Rovers	1–3	Grimsby Town	Wembley Stadium, London
16:00 (BST)	Marsh-Brown 60'	BBC Report	Bogle 42', 43'; Arnold 90+4'	Attendance: 17,198; Referee: Robert Jones

=== Results ===
Home \ Away	ALD	ALT	BRW	BOR	BRA	BRO	CHL	CHR	DOV	EAS	HAL	FGR	GAT	GRI	GUI	KID	LIN	MAC	SOU	TOR	TRA	WEL	WOK	WRE
Aldershot Town		2–0	0–1	1–2	2–1	1–1	0–2	3–1	1–1	1–2	3–2	0–3	1–2	3–4	1–0	1–0	1–2	0–3	1–2	0–0	0–0	1–0	0–1	0–1
Altrincham	4–0		1–0	1–0	0–4	0–0	2–1	0–3	1–2	1–1	1–3	0–1	2–3	2–1	1–1	2–2	3–3	0–0	1–1	1–1	2–1	5–0	3–1	1–1
Barrow	1–3	3–2		0–0	2–0	1–1	1–2	3–2	2–1	1–0	4–1	2–2	0–0	1–3	1–1	1–1	1–0	1–1	1–0	4–0	3–4	1–1	2–1	2–0
Boreham Wood	0–1	0–1	0–2		1–0	2–3	0–0	0–0	3–0	1–1	3–1	0–1	2–3	1–3	1–0	0–2	1–1	0–0	0–2	0–1	0–0	2–0	1–1	0–1
Braintree Town	1–2	3–0	1–1	0–2		1–0	1–0	2–0	1–0	2–0	2–0	1–1	0–0	0–0	0–1	2–1	1–3	1–0	1–0	0–0	0–0	1–0	2–1	1–0
Bromley	1–3	1–3	5–0	1–2	1–2		1–2	3–0	1–1	2–2	1–0	2–2	3–0	1–2	2–0	3–2	2–0	1–0	0–0	0–2	0–1	2–0	2–1	3–1
Cheltenham Town	0–0	1–0	2–1	4–1	1–1	4–1		3–1	3–2	1–1	2–0	1–1	0–0	3–1	5–0	2–0	3–1	2–0	3–0	1–0	0–1	2–0	4–0	2–1
Chester	8–2	1–1	1–2	2–2	1–0	1–1	1–1		1–1	1–0	2–1	1–2	4–2	1–1	1–1	3–1	2–3	0–2	0–0	4–1	0–1	4–0	1–2	3–2
Dover Athletic	5–2	2–1	3–1	2–1	0–0	2–3	1–2	0–0		1–2	1–0	0–1	4–0	1–1	0–0	3–2	4–1	2–1	1–2	5–0	0–0	2–1	2–0	2–1
Eastleigh	1–1	2–0	3–1	1–0	0–2	2–0	1–0	1–0	2–5		2–1	3–2	1–2	0–1	1–1	3–1	1–1	1–0	1–0	3–2	0–1	0–0	2–1	1–1
FC Halifax Town	0–2	1–0	3–1	3–2	3–6	2–2	1–7	0–1	4–2	0–0		0–2	1–1	4–2	1–1	1–1	2–2	1–1	2–2	2–3	1–1	1–1	0–3	2–0
Forest Green Rovers	0–0	2–0	4–0	1–0	1–0	2–1	2–2	2–1	3–1	2–1	0–1		0–1	0–1	3–0	3–0	3–1	2–1	2–1	3–1	0–2	1–0	1–2	0–0
Gateshead	3–2	2–2	1–1	2–1	2–3	3–1	1–1	1–0	2–3	2–1	1–4	0–1		1–0	3–0	1–1	2–0	0–3	0–1	1–2	1–4	1–2	1–5	2–1
Grimsby Town	4–1	5–0	4–1	0–0	0–1	4–1	0–1	1–2	1–0	0–0	7–0	1–1	2–1		1–1	1–0	2–0	0–2	1–0	2–2	1–1	3–1	3–1	1–0
Guiseley	0–4	1–0	3–1	1–1	1–1	2–0	0–2	3–3	0–1	1–4	2–1	0–1	0–2	2–2		1–0	0–1	0–3	1–1	4–3	2–2	2–0	4–4	3–1
Kidderminster Harriers	2–0	1–1	0–0	1–1	0–1	0–1	1–2	2–2	1–1	3–2	1–0	0–2	0–1	2–2	0–1		0–2	3–1	0–1	2–2	0–2	0–1	1–0	1–3
Lincoln City	2–0	1–1	2–2	3–1	2–0	0–1	1–1	2–1	2–3	3–0	0–1	0–1	1–1	1–1	1–0	1–2		5–3	3–1	2–0	1–0	1–1	2–3	1–1
Macclesfield Town	0–2	3–0	1–2	0–0	3–1	2–0	0–1	1–2	0–0	1–2	0–1	4–1	1–0	2–1	1–0	2–1	1–1		0–0	1–2	1–2	2–1	2–1	0–0
Southport	1–1	3–0	2–1	0–3	1–1	5–3	0–4	1–2	0–0	0–4	0–1	0–1	1–2	0–4	2–0	3–4	2–2	3–1		0–1	2–2	3–3	2–2	3–2
Torquay United	0–2	2–0	2–2	1–2	0–0	3–7	0–3	2–0	2–3	0–1	0–0	4–1	0–2	1–1	1–1	3–2	1–3	1–0	1–0		0–1	2–0	0–1	0–1
Tranmere Rovers	3–1	1–0	0–1	0–2	1–2	4–0	0–1	2–0	0–1	1–2	1–0	1–1	3–1	1–0	2–1	2–2	3–2	0–1	1–0	2–1		1–2	1–0	1–2
Welling United	0–1	1–1	1–2	0–3	1–2	1–2	1–1	2–1	1–2	2–2	2–0	1–1	0–1	0–4	1–0	1–2	2–1	0–1	0–1	1–1	1–1		2–1	0–2
Woking	2–1	2–0	2–2	0–0	1–1	2–0	0–1	5–2	0–1	2–1	1–1	2–1	1–1	1–3	0–1	1–1	3–1	2–5	1–2	2–2	4–1	2–0		0–1
Wrexham	3–0	3–1	4–1	1–0	2–3	2–0	2–1	3–0	0–1	2–3	3–1	2–2	4–0	0–0	3–3	2–0	3–1	2–3	0–1	3–1	2–2	1–0	1–3	

Updated to match(es) played on 30 April 2016. Source: Football Conference
Legend: Blue = home team win; Yellow = draw; Red = away team win.

=== Top scorers ===
As of matches played 30 April 2016

Rank	Player	Club	Goals
1	(Republic of Ireland) Pádraig Amond	Grimsby Town	30
1	(England) Dan Holman	Cheltenham Town	30
3	(England) Andy Cook	Barrow	24
4	(England) Ross Hannah	Chester	23
5	(England) Kristian Dennis	Macclesfield Town	22
5	(England) Daniel Wright	Cheltenham Town	22
7	(England) Moses Emmanuel	Bromley	20
7	(England) Matt Rhead	Lincoln City	20
7	(England) Ricky Miller	Dover Athletic	20
10	(England) James Norwood	Tranmere Rovers	19

== National League North ==
National League North
- Season: 2015–16
- Champions: Solihull Moors
- Promoted: Solihull Moors; North Ferriby United
- Relegated: Corby Town; Hednesford Town; Lowestoft Town

=== Promotion and relegation ===
Teams relegated from 2014–15 Conference Premier

- AFC Telford United
- Alfreton Town
- Nuneaton Town

Teams promoted from 2014–15 Northern Premier League Premier Division

- F.C. United of Manchester (League Champions)
- Curzon Ashton (Play-off Winners)

Teams promoted from 2014–15 Southern League Premier Division

- Corby Town (League Champions)

=== League table ===
Pos	Team	Pld	W	D	L	GF	GA	GD	Pts	Promotion, qualification or relegation
1	Solihull Moors (C, P)	42	25	10	7	84	48	+36	85	Promotion to National League
2	North Ferriby United (O, P)	42	22	10	10	82	49	+33	76	Qualification for the National League North play-offs
3	AFC Fylde	42	22	9	11	76	53	+23	75	Qualification for the National League North play-offs
4	Harrogate Town	42	21	9	12	73	46	+27	72	Qualification for the National League North play-offs
5	Boston United	42	22	5	15	73	60	+13	71	Qualification for the National League North play-offs
6	Nuneaton Town	42	20	13	9	71	46	+25	70 (Note: Nuneaton Town were deducted three points for fielding an ineligible player in their win over Corby Town on 27 February 2016.)	
7	Tamworth	42	16	15	11	55	45	+10	63	
8	Chorley	42	18	9	15	64	55	+9	63	
9	Stockport County	42	15	14	13	50	49	+1	59	
10	Alfreton Town	42	15	13	14	58	54	+4	58	
11	Curzon Ashton	42	14	15	13	55	52	+3	57	
12	Stalybridge Celtic	42	14	11	17	62	75	−13	53	
13	FC United of Manchester	42	15	8	19	60	75	−15	53	
14	Bradford (Park Avenue)	42	13	11	18	51	59	−8	50	
15	Gloucester City	42	12	14	16	39	49	−10	50	
16	Gainsborough Trinity	42	14	8	20	46	62	−16	50	
17	Worcester City	42	12	12	18	55	61	−6	48	
18	AFC Telford United	42	13	8	21	47	60	−13	47	
19	Brackley Town	42	11	13	18	45	54	−9	46	
20	Lowestoft Town (R)	42	12	10	20	48	69	−21	46	Relegation to the Isthmian League Premier Division
21	Hednesford Town (R)	42	8	14	20	50	77	−27	38	Relegation to the Northern Premier League Premier Division
22	Corby Town (R)	42	7	11	24	47	93	−46	32	Relegation to the Northern Premier League Premier Division

Source: Football Conference
Rules for classification: 1) Points; 2) Goal difference; 3) Number of goals scored
(C) Champions; (O) Play-off winners; (P) Promoted; (R) Relegated

==== Play-offs ====
Semi-finals
2	North Ferriby United	0	3	3
5	Boston United	2	0	2
3	AFC Fylde	1	1	2
4	Harrogate Town	0	1	1

Final
2	North Ferriby United (a.e.t.)	2
3	AFC Fylde	1

==== First leg ====
4 May 2016	Boston United	2–0	North Ferriby United	York Street, Boston
19:45	Roberts 23'; Mills 90+5'	Report		Attendance: 2,592

4 May 2016	Harrogate Town	0–1	AFC Fylde	Wetherby Road, Harrogate
19:45		Report	Rowe 53'	Attendance: 1,694

==== Second leg ====
8 May 2016	North Ferriby United	3–0 (3–2 agg.)	Boston United	Grange Lane, North Ferriby
15:00	King 11' (pen.); Denton 16'; Clarke 54'	Report		Attendance: 2,027

8 May 2016	AFC Fylde	1–1 (2–1 agg.)	Harrogate Town	Kellamergh Park, Fylde
15:00	Finley 11'	Report	Knowles 15'	Attendance: 1,384

==== Final ====
14 May 2016	North Ferriby United	2–1 (a.e.t.)	AFC Fylde	Grange Lane, North Ferriby
15:00	Brooksby 45+3'; Hone 95'	Report	Finley 24'	Attendance: 1,829

=== Results ===
Home \ Away	FYL	TEL	ALF	BOS	BRK	BPA	CHO	COR	CZA	FCU	GAI	GLO	HAR	HED	LOW	NFU	NUN	SOL	STL	STP	TAM	WRC
AFC Fylde		1–0	0–1	5–2	2–2	1–0	1–0	2–1	1–2	4–0	2–2	1–0	2–1	2–0	1–0	2–3	2–2	1–2	5–0	2–3	2–2	2–3
AFC Telford United	1–2		1–1	2–2	2–0	3–1	2–0	3–0	0–0	5–1	0–2	0–1	0–4	1–3	1–0	1–1	1–5	0–3	2–0	0–1	1–0	2–0
Alfreton Town	1–2	2–3		1–2	1–1	0–1	1–0	1–1	2–2	0–1	1–0	1–1	3–2	4–0	0–1	0–1	2–2	2–2	1–3	0–3	1–0	2–1
Boston United	0–3	1–0	2–1		1–2	3–0	1–2	2–0	2–1	3–1	1–0	1–0	3–3	3–1	4–1	1–2	2–1	1–4	0–3	4–0	1–1	1–1
Brackley Town	0–0	0–0	1–4	1–3		0–0	1–1	1–2	2–0	4–0	3–2	1–0	1–0	1–1	2–2	2–4	2–3	0–1	2–3	0–1	1–0	2–0
Bradford Park Avenue	1–2	1–0	2–2	1–2	1–0		1–0	1–0	4–2	3–1	1–4	1–1	3–1	1–1	3–0	4–4	2–3	1–1	3–1	0–0	0–2	3–1
Chorley	3–2	2–1	1–2	2–0	1–0	2–2		3–0	2–0	3–0	3–1	0–1	0–1	2–2	2–0	2–3	2–3	2–2	0–0	1–0	1–1	2–0
Corby Town	1–2	3–2	2–3	2–3	1–1	2–0	2–2		0–4	2–3	1–2	3–1	0–3	0–0	3–5	1–4	1–3	1–3	0–3	0–4	2–0	0–3
Curzon Ashton	0–2	1–0	0–2	0–2	1–1	2–1	4–2	2–2		0–0	3–0	1–1	1–2	3–2	4–1	0–3	1–0	1–3	0–0	0–0	2–0	3–1
F.C. United of Manchester	1–2	1–3	1–3	1–2	3–2	2–1	2–0	1–0	3–3		1–2	1–2	4–3	1–1	6–1	3–2	3–2	2–2	0–1	1–2	1–1	0–2
Gainsborough Trinity	0–2	1–1	1–1	1–0	1–0	0–1	2–1	1–1	0–2	0–1		3–3	2–1	3–1	1–1	2–0	1–0	1–6	3–1	0–1	0–2	1–1
Gloucester City	1–3	1–0	1–1	1–0	0–0	1–3	1–1	1–0	3–1	1–0	0–2		0–1	2–2	0–1	3–2	0–1	0–2	3–0	0–0	1–2	0–1
Harrogate Town	2–2	0–1	1–2	0–0	1–0	2–1	2–4	5–0	1–1	5–0	3–1	0–0		2–1	4–0	3–3	0–3	6–0	2–1	2–1	0–0	1–0
Hednesford Town	0–1	2–0	3–3	3–2	0–2	0–0	1–3	3–3	0–3	0–3	0–2	2–2	2–3		2–1	1–1	2–4	0–0	2–1	1–2	2–1	0–1
Lowestoft Town	3–1	3–0	1–0	3–0	1–2	3–0	2–0	2–2	0–0	1–4	1–0	1–1	1–2	0–0		0–3	0–1	2–2	0–2	2–2	0–4	2–1
North Ferriby United	3–0	2–0	0–1	4–3	2–1	1–0	4–0	5–0	0–0	1–0	4–0	3–0	0–1	1–1	0–0		1–2	1–1	1–0	2–0	3–1	3–3
Nuneaton Town	1–1	0–0	2–0	1–3	1–0	1–0	2–2	0–0	0–1	2–2	2–0	0–1	0–0	3–0	1–0	3–1		0–1	3–3	1–1	3–0	1–1
Solihull Moors	3–0	2–1	2–1	0–1	3–0	2–1	0–2	4–1	2–0	1–2	3–2	0–0	1–0	1–2	2–1	1–3	3–1		4–1	1–0	1–2	3–0
Stalybridge Celtic	1–1	5–5	1–1	0–5	3–1	1–1	0–1	2–3	1–1	1–0	0–0	1–0	0–1	4–2	3–1	2–0	2–5	1–3		1–1	3–5	3–1
Stockport County	0–4	0–1	1–0	2–1	1–1	2–0	1–3	2–2	0–0	1–2	2–0	3–0	1–2	3–0	0–2	1–1	1–1	2–4	0–3		1–1	0–0
Tamworth	3–1	2–1	1–2	1–2	1–2	0–0	2–1	0–0	2–1	1–1	2–0	2–2	1–0	1–0	1–1	1–0	1–1	1–1	1–1	1–1		3–0
Worcester City	2–2	3–0	1–1	2–1	0–0	3–1	2–3	1–2	2–2	0–0	2–0	1–2	0–0	1–4	2–1	2–0	0–1	2–2	5–0	2–3	1–2	

Updated to match(es) played on 30 April 2016. Source: Football Conference
Legend: Blue = home team win; Yellow = draw; Red = away team win.

=== Stadia and locations ===
Locations of the 2015–16 National League North clubs

Team	Stadium	Capacity
AFC Fylde	Kellamergh Park	3,180
AFC Telford United	New Bucks Head	6,300
Alfreton Town	North Street	3,600
Boston United	York Street	6,643
Brackley Town	St. James Park	3,500
Bradford Park Avenue	Horsfall Stadium	3,500
Chorley	The Chorley Group Victory Park Stadium	4,100
Corby Town	Steel Park	3,893
Curzon Ashton	Tameside Stadium	4,000
F.C. United of Manchester	Broadhurst Park	4,400
Gainsborough Trinity	The Northolme	4,304
Gloucester City	Whaddon Road	7,066
Harrogate Town	Wetherby Road	3,800
Hednesford Town	Keys Park	6,500
Lowestoft Town	Crown Meadow	3,000
North Ferriby United	Grange Lane	2,700
Nuneaton Town	Liberty Way	4,314
Solihull Moors	Damson Park	3,050
Stalybridge Celtic	Bower Fold	6,500
Stockport County	Edgeley Park	10,841
Tamworth	The Lamb Ground	4,000
Worcester City	Aggborough Stadium	6,302

=== Top scorers ===
As of matches played 30 April 2016

Rank	Player	Club	Goals
1	(England) Dayle Southwell	Boston United	24
1	(England) Danny Rowe	AFC Fylde	24
2	(England) Brendon Daniels	Harrogate Town	22
4	(England) Tom Denton	North Ferriby United	20
5	(Jamaica) Darren Stephenson	Chorley	18
6	(Netherlands) Akwasi Asante	Solihull Moors	17
6	(England) Liam King	North Ferriby United	17
8	(Nigeria) Chibuzor Chilaka	Bradford Park Avenue	16
8	(England) Greg Mills	Corby Town	16
10	(England) Lee Hughes	Worcester City	15
10	(England) Jake Reed	Lowestoft Town	15

== National League South ==
National League South
- Season: 2015–16
- Champions: Sutton United
- Promoted: Sutton United; Maidstone United
- Relegated: Basingstoke Town; Havant & Waterlooville; Hayes & Yeading United

=== Promotion and relegation ===
Teams relegated from 2014–15 Conference Premier

- Dartford

Teams transferred from 2014–15 Conference North

- Oxford City

Teams promoted from 2014–15 Isthmian League Premier Division

- Maidstone United (League Champions)
- Margate (Play-off Winners)

Teams promoted from 2014–15 Southern League Premier Division

- Truro City (Play-off Winners)

=== League table ===
Pos	Team	Pld	W	D	L	GF	GA	GD	Pts	Promotion, qualification or relegation
1	Sutton United (C, P)	42	26	12	4	83	32	+51	90	Promotion to National League
2	Ebbsfleet United	42	24	12	6	73	36	+37	84	Qualification for the National League South play-offs
3	Maidstone United (O, P)	42	24	5	13	55	40	+15	77	Qualification for the National League South play-offs
4	Truro City	42	17	14	11	62	55	+7	65	Qualification for the National League South play-offs
5	Whitehawk	42	18	10	14	75	62	+13	64	Qualification for the National League South play-offs
6	Hemel Hempstead Town	42	16	13	13	72	66	+6	61	
7	Maidenhead United	42	16	11	15	66	62	+4	59	
8	Dartford	42	16	11	15	58	56	+2	59	
9	Gosport Borough	42	15	11	16	53	63	−10	56	
10	Concord Rangers	42	15	10	17	66	68	−2	55	
11	Bishop's Stortford	42	15	10	17	56	63	−7	55	
12	Oxford City	42	13	15	14	70	60	+10	54	
13	Wealdstone	42	12	17	13	63	64	−1	53	
14	Bath City	42	14	11	17	50	61	−11	53	
15	Chelmsford City	42	15	7	20	66	64	+2	52	
16	Weston-super-Mare	42	14	9	19	63	76	−13	51	
17	Eastbourne Borough	42	13	11	18	60	63	−3	50	
18	St Albans City	42	13	10	19	58	65	−7	49	
19	Margate	42	13	8	21	51	73	−22	47	
20	Havant & Waterlooville (R)	42	12	11	19	52	75	−23	47	Relegation to the Isthmian League Premier Division
21	Hayes & Yeading United (R)	42	11	13	18	51	76	−25	46	Relegation to the Southern League Premier Division
22	Basingstoke Town (R)	42	9	11	22	46	69	−23	38	Relegation to the Southern League Premier Division

Source: BBC Sport
Rules for classification: 1) Points; 2) Goal difference; 3) Number of goals scored
(C) Champions; (O) Play-off winners; (P) Promoted; (R) Relegated

==== Play-offs ====
Semi-finals
2	Ebbsfleet United (a.e.t.)	2	1	3 (3)
5	Whitehawk	1	2	3 (2)
3	Maidstone United	2	1	3
4	Truro City	0	0	0

Final
2	Ebbsfleet United	2 (3)
3	Maidstone United (a.e.t.)	2 (4)

==== First leg ====
4 May 2016	Whitehawk	1–2	Ebbsfleet United	The Enclosed Ground, Whitehawk
19:45	Mills 82'	Report	Lewis 29'; Kedwell 74'	Attendance: 1,055

4 May 2016	Truro City	0–2	Maidstone United	Treyew Road, Truro
19:45			Healy 27'; Flisher 56'	Attendance: 1,705

==== Second leg ====
8 May 2016	Ebbsfleet United	1–2 (a.e.t.) (3–3 agg.) (3–2 p)	Whitehawk	Stonebridge Road, Northfleet
15:00	Clark 24'	Report	Arnold 4'; Mills 51'	Attendance: 1,942
	Penalties
	Parkes (penalty scored); Sheringham (penalty scored); Lewis (penalty missed); Godden (penalty scored)		(penalty scored) Martin; (penalty missed) Graham; (penalty missed) Rents; (penalty scored) Arnold; (penalty missed) Robinson

8 May 2016	Maidstone United	1–0 (3–0 agg.)	Truro City	Gallagher Stadium, Maidstone
15:00	Flisher 73'	Report		Attendance: 2,508

==== Final ====
14 May 2016	Ebbsfleet United	2–2 (a.e.t.) (3–4 p)	Maidstone United	Stonebridge Road, Northfleet
15:00	Kedwell 20' (pen.), 109' (pen.)	Report	Taylor 47'; Dumaka 120+1'	Attendance: 3,800
	Penalties
	Parkes (penalty scored); Sheringham (penalty scored); Bonner (penalty missed); Godden (penalty scored); Kedwell (penalty missed)		(penalty scored) Flisher; (penalty scored) Paxman; (penalty scored) Taylor; (penalty missed) Dumaka; (penalty scored) Sweeney

=== Results ===
Home \ Away	BAS	BAT	BST	CHE	CON	DAR	EAB	EBB	GOS	H&W	H&Y	HEM	MDH	MDS	MAR	OXC	SAC	SUT	TRU	WEA	WSM	WHI
Basingstoke Town		1–2	1–1	1–2	0–2	0–1	1–5	1–2	0–1	1–1	1–0	2–0	2–1	0–1	3–4	2–0	2–2	1–2	2–0	1–1	2–2	3–1
Bath City	3–1		2–2	2–0	0–1	0–4	1–0	1–1	0–1	5–0	2–3	1–1	2–1	0–2	2–0	1–3	1–0	1–3	0–3	2–1	2–1	0–3
Bishop's Stortford	1–2	3–2		1–2	3–2	1–2	1–1	1–2	2–0	3–0	3–4	1–0	0–2	0–1	4–1	3–0	2–1	0–2	0–3	2–1	0–1	2–1
Chelmsford City	0–2	3–1	4–1		5–2	0–1	0–3	0–9	6–1	2–2	4–0	0–1	4–1	3–0	2–3	0–4	2–1	0–2	1–2	0–2	2–3	4–3
Concord Rangers	5–0	1–2	2–2	1–0		2–3	4–1	3–6	7–0	0–1	0–3	0–3	2–0	1–2	2–1	0–2	1–2	0–3	1–2	2–2	4–1	1–2
Dartford	3–0	4–1	3–1	1–1	1–2		1–0	0–1	2–3	4–2	2–0	2–2	2–0	1–1	1–1	2–2	2–0	2–2	0–1	1–2	2–1	2–4
Eastbourne Borough	1–2	5–2	0–1	2–0	7–1	1–1		1–2	3–0	2–2	2–0	2–3	1–2	1–0	1–4	1–1	1–0	1–1	6–0	3–0	3–3	1–1
Ebbsfleet United	1–0	0–1	4–2	3–1	4–2	1–1	4–2		2–0	2–2	9–0	6–0	3–1	0–1	1–2	1–1	1–0	1–0	13–0	2–3	2–1	2–2
Gosport Borough	3–2	3–1	3–4	2–1	2–3	1–3	3–1	1–2		2–1	2–5	2–6	2–1	0–4	1–2	4–0	5–0	0–2	3–1	1–1	1–0	2–2
Havant & Waterlooville	1–0	1–1	2–1	0–1	2–1	2–0	4–0	1–4	1–3		1–0	1–2	3–1	2–1	2–0	2–1	1–1	0–2	0–3	1–2	1–1	2–3
Hayes & Yeading United	3–0	0–3	0–2	0–5	2–2	2–2	4–4	0–5	0–2	0–3		1–1	2–5	1–0	0–2	2–1	1–3	1–3	2–2	5–0	6–1	3–4
Hemel Hempstead Town	2–2	1–1	1–2	1–1	1–2	1–0	1–0	1–2	1–0	2–0	4–0		0–1	0–1	1–2	3–1	2–7	2–9	2–1	2–2	5–5	0–3
Maidenhead United	4–3	3–1	4–1	1–0	2–2	2–1	2–0	3–2	6–0	2–2	2–1	2–3		0–2	3–1	2–1	0–1	1–1	7–0	1–1	2–0	3–0
Maidstone United	3–1	1–0	1–1	0–1	2–2	1–2	2–1	0–2	2–1	1–0	3–1	2–1	1–2		2–1	0–1	1–0	1–2	2–1	1–0	3–1	0–1
Margate	2–1	1–1	1–1	4–1	0–1	0–2	0–1	0–2	1–0	4–1	1–2	4–3	3–2	1–0		0–2	0–1	0–4	1–1	0–3	0–2	2–6
Oxford City	2–2	1–1	3–1	2–2	5–1	2–1	2–2	1–1	1–2	1–3	2–2	0–2	0–4	2–3	1–1		4–1	0–1	1–2	3–2	3–0	0–4
St Albans City	3–0	0–1	1–1	1–1	2–2	4–0	3–1	0–2	1–3	6–0	1–1	2–2	3–2	1–2	3–0	1–3		0–3	0–1	1–0	2–1	6–0
Sutton United	2–0	1–1	2–0	2–0	2–2	2–0	2–1	2–0	1–0	3–0	0–1	2–2	2–2	0–2	4–1	1–1	5–0		2–2	5–2	5–0	2–2
Truro City	2–0	3–1	0–1	1–0	2–1	3–0	1–0	1–1	2–2	3–0	0–2	4–2	4–4	1–3	2–1	0–6	2–0	0–2		1–2	1–3	1–1
Wealdstone	4–4	2–0	3–1	0–5	1–2	2–1	0–1	1–2	1–1	3–2	3–0	0–0	0–0	2–2	4–1	2–2	1–1	0–2	4–4		2–3	2–2
Weston-super-Mare	2–1	1–1	1–1	0–3	0–3	2–1	1–2	2–1	0–4	3–2	0–2	2–4	2–0	1–2	1–0	5–2	4–1	0–2	2–2	1–2		1–2
Whitehawk	1–0	0–1	2–3	4–2	0–2	0–1	1–2	0–1	3–0	1–1	1–3	0–1	3–2	1–0	2–2	2–0	6–0	2–0	5–0	3–0	0–2	

Updated to match(es) played on 30 April 2016. Source: Football Conference
Legend: Blue = home team win; Yellow = draw; Red = away team win.

=== Stadium and locations ===
Locations of the 2015–16 National League South clubs (Greater London shown in more detail below)
Locations of the 2015–16 National League South clubs (Greater London)

Team	Stadium	Capacity
Basingstoke Town	The Camrose	6,000
Bath City	Twerton Park	8,840
Bishop's Stortford	Woodside Park	4,525
Chelmsford City	Melbourne Stadium	3,019
Concord Rangers	Thames Road	3,300
Dartford	Princes Park	4,100
Eastbourne Borough	Priory Lane	4,134
Ebbsfleet United	Stonebridge Road	5,011
Gosport Borough	Privett Park	4,500
Havant & Waterlooville	West Leigh Park	5,250
Hayes & Yeading United	York Road (groundshare with Maidenhead United)	3,000
Hemel Hempstead Town	Vauxhall Road	3,152
Maidenhead United	York Road	3,000
Maidstone United	Gallagher Stadium	3,063
Margate	Hartsdown Park	3,000
Oxford City	Court Place Farm	2,000
St Albans City	Clarence Park	4,500
Sutton United	Gander Green Lane	5,013
Truro City	Treyew Road	3,857
Wealdstone	The Vale	2,640
Weston-super-Mare	Woodspring Stadium	3,500
Whitehawk	The Enclosed Ground	2,000

=== Top scorers ===
As of matches played 30 April 2016

Rank	Player	Club	Goals
1	(England) Elliott Buchanan	Bishop's Stortford	28
2	(England) Matt Godden	Ebbsfleet United	26
3	(England) Danny Mills	Whitehawk	23
3	(England) Justin Bennett	Gosport Borough	23
5	(England) Dan Fitchett	Sutton United	20
6	(England) Scott Wilson	Weston-super-Mare	19
6	(England) Steve Cawley	Concord Rangers	19
8	(Grenada) Bradley Bubb	Oxford City	18
8	(England) Nathaniel Pinney	Eastbourne Borough	18
8	(England) Elliot Bradbrook	Dartford	18
8	(England) Louie Theophanous	St Albans City	18
