= Charles Ambler =

Charles Ambler may refer to:

- Charles Ambler (footballer) (1868–1952), English footballer
- Charles Ambler (barrister) (1721–1794), English barrister and politician
- Charles Henry Ambler (1876–1957), American historian, teacher, professor and civil servant
