= Bobby-Joe Taylor =

English footballer

Personal information
- Date of birth: 4 February 1995 (age 31)
- Place of birth: Ashford, England
- Positions: Defender; midfielder

Team information
- Current team: Farnham Town
- Number: 16

Youth career
- –2009: Chelsea
- 2009–2011: Gillingham
- 2011–2012: Cambridge United

Senior career*
Years	Team	Apps	(Gls)
2012–2015	Cambridge United	8	(0)
2013	→ St Neots Town (loan)	13	(1)
2014	→ Cambridge Regional College (loan)	3	(2)
2014	→ Arlesey Town (loan)	8	(1)
2015	→ Bishop's Stortford (loan)	12	(2)
2015–2017	Maidstone United	71	(8)
2017–2018	Aldershot Town	25	(1)
2018	Bromley	12	(0)
2018	→ Dover Athletic (loan)	4	(0)
2018–2020	Dover Athletic	52	(2)
2020–2021	Ebbsfleet United	16	(3)
2021–2025	Dorking Wanderers	125	(8)
2023	Dorking Wanderers B	1	(1)
2024–2025	→ Horsham (loan)	10	(0)
2025	→ Walton & Hersham (loan)	14	(3)
2025–	Farnham Town	54	(12)

International career^{‡}
2017	England C	2	(0)
- * Club domestic league appearances and goals as of 14:19, 20 November 2026 (UTC) ‡ National team caps and goals as of 31 May 2017

Bobby-Joe Taylor (born 4 February 1995) is an English professional footballer who plays as a defender or midfielder for National League South club Farnham Town.

== Club career ==
=== Cambridge United ===
After youth spells with Chelsea and Gillingham, Taylor joined Cambridge United in 2011. On 16 February 2013, Taylor made his Cambridge debut in their 3–1 away defeat against Mansfield Town replacing Jamie Reed in the 89th minute. After a first-team breakthrough in the previous season, Taylor instead spent loan spells at Southern League Premier Division sides St Neots Town and Arlesey Town during the 2013–14 campaign, in which he made a total of 25 appearances, scoring twice.

On 30 August 2014, Taylor made his Football League debut in Cambridge's 5–0 victory over Carlisle United, replacing Ryan Donaldson with five minutes remaining.

On 11 February 2015, Taylor joined Conference South side Bishop's Stortford on a one-month loan deal. Three days later, Taylor made his Bishop's Stortford debut in their 1–1 draw with Ebbsfleet United, playing the full 90 minutes. On 7 March 2015, Taylor scored his first goal for the club in their 4–1 away victory against Wealdstone, coming off the bench to seal Bishop's Stortford's fourth of the game.

=== Maidstone United ===
Taylor joined Maidstone United on a one-year contract in June 2015. In a first season that Taylor admitted was difficult at times, the left winger played his way into first team contention at just the right time, being an unlikely deputy at right back due to an injury to Callum Driver at the back end of the season. Taylor went on to star in the club's National League South play off semi final games against Truro City, back in his more natural left wing position, and scored a goal in the playoff final against Ebbsfleet United. The game ended 2–2 and Taylor was one of the Stones' successful penalty takers as the club beat the Fleet to the National League South promotion final trophy.

Taylor signed a further one-year contract with Maidstone in the summer of 2016 as they embarked in their first National League season since reformation. On the opening day of the 2016–17 campaign, Taylor scored his first league goal for the club in their 1–1 draw with recently relegated York City. Taylor went onto score seven more league goals, finishing the season just one behind top goalscorer; Jamar Loza. After an impressive campaign, Taylor received his first England C call-up along with teammate Kevin Lokko for their fixtures against Panjab and Jersey. On 17 May 2017, it was announced that Taylor would leave the club after failing to agree a new deal.

=== Aldershot Town ===
On 1 June 2017, preceding his release from Maidstone, Taylor joined fellow National League side Aldershot Town on a one-year deal.

He was released by Aldershot at the end of the 2017–18 season.

=== Dover Athletic ===
Taylor joined Dover Athletic on a one-month loan deal from Bromley on 25 October 2018. Taylor made his debut for "the Whites" on the 27 October in a 2–1 away defeat to fellow relegation-threatened side Braintree Town.

On 23 November 2018, Taylor permanently signed for the Kent club until the end of the 2018–19 season after a successful loan spell, during which Dover picked up only their second league win of the season.

Taylor joined Ebbsfleet United for the eventually aborted 2020–21 National League South season.

=== Dorking Wanderers ===
In May 2021, Taylor joined fellow National League South side Dorking Wanderers. On 21 May 2022, Taylor played in the National League South play-off final as Dorking defeated Ebbsfleet United to reach the National League for the first time.

On 19 November 2024, Taylor joined Isthmian League Premier Division side Horsham on a one-month loan deal. In February 2025, he joined Walton & Hersham on a further one-month loan.

On 14 May 2025, it was announced that Taylor would leave the club at the end of his contract in June.

=== Farnham Town ===
On 21 May 2025, Taylor joined newly promoted Southern League Premier Division South side Farnham Town.

== Career statistics ==
As of match played 14 November 2026

Appearances and goals by club, season and competition
Club	Season	League			FA Cup		League Cup		Other		Total	
Club	Season	Division	Apps	Goals	Apps	Goals	Apps	Goals	Apps	Goals	Apps	Goals
Cambridge United	2012–13	Conference Premier	1	0	0	0	—		0	0	1	0
Cambridge United	2013–14	Conference Premier	0	0	—		—		—		0	0
Cambridge United	2014–15	League Two	7	0	1	0	0	0	1 (Note: Appearance(s) in Football League Trophy)	0	9	0
Cambridge United	Total		8	0	1	0	0	0	1	0	10	0
St Neots Town (loan)	2013–14	SFL Premier Division	13	1	3	0	—		1 (Note: Appearance(s) in FA Trophy)	0	17	1
Arlesey Town (loan)	2013–14	SFL Premier Division	8	1	—		—		—		8	1
Bishop's Stortford (loan)	2014–15	Conference South	12	2	0	0	—		0	0	12	2
Maidstone United	2015–16	National League South	30	0	1	0	—		5 (Note: Two appearances in FA Trophy, three appearances and one goal in National League South play-offs)	1	36	1
Maidstone United	2016–17	National League	41	8	2	1	—		2	0	45	9
Maidstone United	Total		71	8	3	1	—		7	1	81	10
Aldershot Town	2017–18	National League	25	1	0	0	—		1	0	26	1
Bromley	2018–19	National League	12	0	1	0	—		0	0	13	0
Dover Athletic (loan)	2018–19	National League	4	0	0	0	—		0	0	4	0
Dover Athletic	2018–19	National League	23	0	0	0	—		1	0	24	0
Dover Athletic	2019-20	National League	29	2	3	0	—		0	0	32	2
Dover Athletic	Total		52	2	3	0	—		1	0	56	2
Ebbsfleet United	2020–21	National League South	16	3	1	0	—		2	0	19	3
Dorking Wanderers	2021–22	National League South	34	4	4	1	—		1	0	39	5
Dorking Wanderers	2022–23	National League	40	3	1	0	—		2	0	43	3
Dorking Wanderers	2023–24	National League	36	0	1	0	—		2	1	39	1
Dorking Wanderers	2024–25	National League South	15	1	0	0	—		0	0	15	1
Dorking Wanderers	Total		125	8	6	1	—		5	1	136	10
Dorking Wanderers B	2023–24	SCL Division One	1	1	—		—		0	0	1	1
Horsham (loan)	2024–25	Isthmian League Premier Division	10	0	0	0	—		2 (Note: One appearance in Surrey Senior Cup, one appearance in FA Trophy)	0	12	0
Walton & Hersham (loan)	2024–25	SFL Premier Division South	14	3	—		—		1 (Note: Appearance(s) in SFL Premier Division South play-offs)	1	15	4
Farnham Town	2025–26	SFL Premier Division South	40	11	5	1	—		4 (Note: Two appearances in FA Trophy, two appearances and one goal in SFL Premier Division South play-offs)	1	49	13
Farnham Town	2026–27	National League South	14	1	2	0	—		1	0	17	1
Farnham Town	Total		54	12	7	1	—		5	1	66	14
Career total			410	41	25	3	0	0	26	4	461	48
