= Danny Mills (footballer, born 1991) =

English semi-profesional footballer (born 1991)

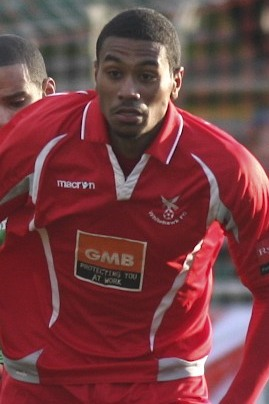
- Mills playing for Whitehawk in February 2013

Personal information
- Full name: Daniel Paul Mills
- Date of birth: 27 November 1991 (age 34)
- Place of birth: Croydon, England
- Height: 6 ft 4 in (1.93 m)
- Position: Striker

Team information
- Current team: Dulwich Hamlet

Youth career
- 2007–2008: Croydon

Senior career*
| Years | Team | Apps | (Gls) |
| 2008–2009 | Crawley Town | 2 | (0) |
| 2009–2012 | Peterborough United | 3 | (0) |
| 2009 | → Torquay United (loan) | 2 | (0) |
| 2009 | → Rushden & Diamonds (loan) | 1 | (0) |
| 2010 | → Histon (loan) | 18 | (1) |
| 2011 | → Kettering Town (loan) | 17 | (6) |
| 2011–2012 | → Tamworth (loan) | 20 | (3) |
| 2012 | → Kettering Town (loan) | 18 | (2) |
| 2012 | Carshalton Athletic | 10 | (1) |
| 2012–2017 | Whitehawk | 170+ | (88) |
| 2017–2019 | Ebbsfleet United | 10 | (1) |
| 2017–2018 | → Dartford (loan) | 23 | (6) |
| 2018–2019 | → Welling United (loan) | 37 | (9) |
| 2019– | Dulwich Hamlet | 206 | (63) |

Managerial career
- 2025: Dulwich Hamlet (caretaker)
- * Club domestic league appearances and goals as of 3:28, 28 August 2025 (UTC)

Daniel Paul Mills (born 27 November 1991) is an English footballer who plays as a striker for Dulwich Hamlet.

== Career ==
Born in Croydon, London, Mills started his career with the Croydon F.C. youth system in 2007 before signing for Conference National club Crawley Town in 2008. Mills scored 26 goals in 2008–2009 for Crawley's youth team and made two first-team appearances as a substitute, earning a trial at Rangers and a £15,000 move to Peterborough United.

=== Peterborough United ===
Mills made his Football League Two debut on loan at Torquay United on 26 September 2009, coming on as a substitute in the 74th minute for Elliot Benyon in a 1–2 defeat at Macclesfield Town, before joining Rushden & Diamonds on loan in October 2009. He made his Diamonds debut in an FA Cup tie at Workington on 24 October 2009, but after little opportunity in the first team, he returned to Peterborough United after just one month. Mills made his Peterborough United debut in a Championship fixture against Barnsley on 5 April 2010, which ended in a 2–2 draw and confirmed The Posh's relegation.

Mills joined Conference National side Histon on 30 July 2010 in a season long loan deal, making his debut at home to Altrincham on 9 October 2010 and scoring after coming on as a 90th-minute substitute. Following the result Mills spoke of his delight at scoring his first goal for Histon. Mills was re-called from his loan to Histon on 3 January 2011 and on 15 February 2011 joined Kettering Town on loan until the end of the season. Mills was then reunited with his former Kettering manager Marcus Law at Tamworth, in another loan deal before a further loan at Kettering Town.

=== Carshalton Athletic ===
After being released by Peterborough United in the summer of 2012, Mills moved back to his home town of Croydon to join Carshalton Athletic at the start of the 2012–13 Isthmian League Premier Division season. Used primarily as a striker, and occasionally on the right of a front three, he played 10 games and scored three goals – two in an FA Trophy qualifier against Heybridge Swifts and one against Kingstonian in a 2–1 league defeat.

=== Whitehawk ===
Mills joined newly promoted Whitehawk in November 2012 and helped The Hawks to the Isthmian League Premier Division title in his first season at the Enclosed Ground. Mills established himself as one of the leading goal scorers in Conference South the following year, despite The Hawks spending most of the 2013–2014 season battling against relegation. Mills finished the season as the club's top scorer, with 21 goals in all competitions, including five league goals in a 6–2 away win at Dorchester Town on 24 August 2013. Once the club had secured its place in the division for the next season, The Hawks activated a clause in Mills' contract to keep him at the club and in June 2014 turned down a five-figure bid from Conference South rivals Havant & Waterlooville.

Mills scored a further 18 league goals in 2014–2015 as well as the opening goal at Falmer Stadium in a 5–0 Sussex Senior Cup Final win over Lewes on 16 May 2015. In the summer of 2015, he signed a further two-year contract with Whitehawk, saying he was "staying at the club he loves".

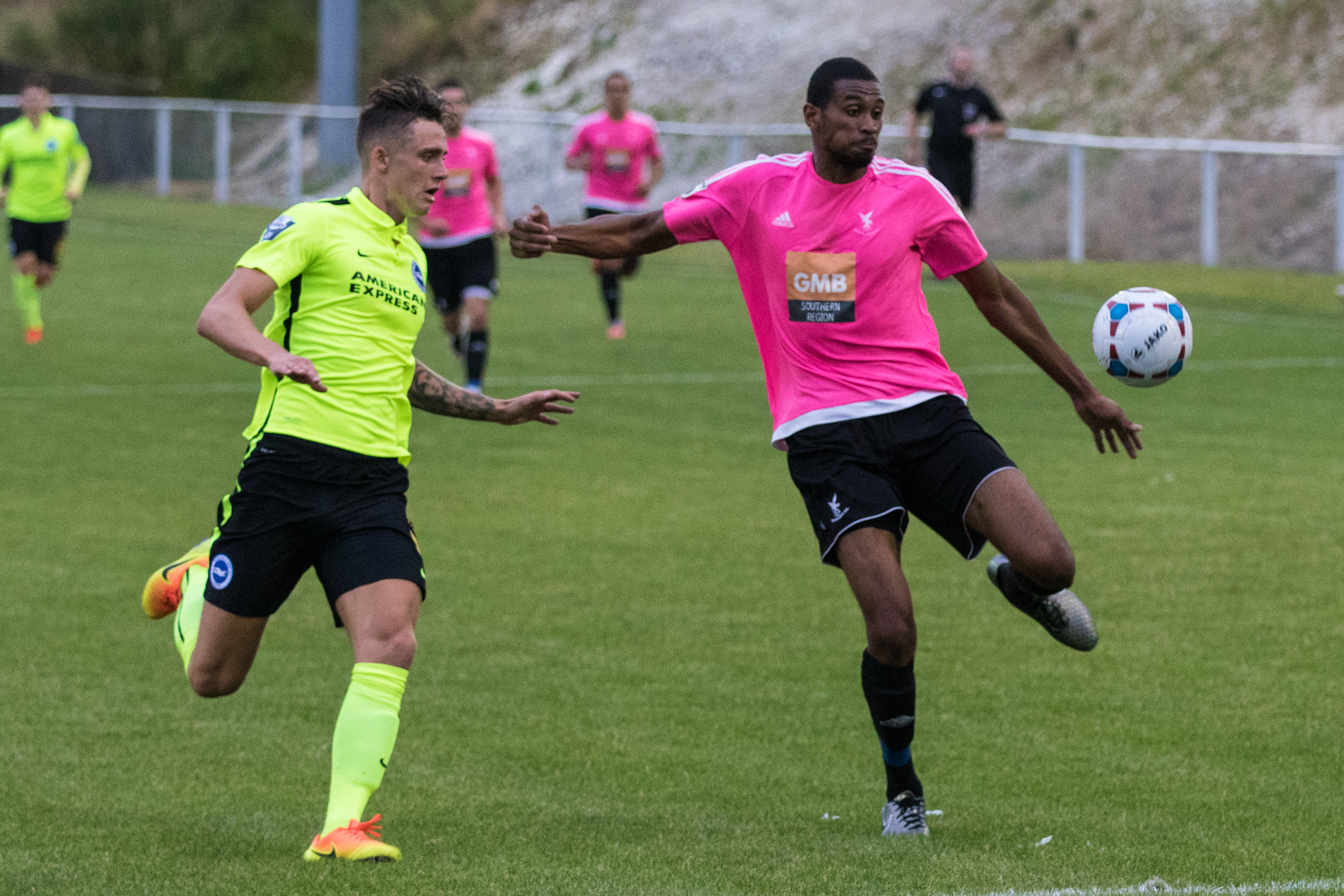
Mills (right) playing for Whitehawk in August 2016

Mills scored eight times in the FA Cup in 2015–16, including the opening goal to give Whitehawk the lead in the round 2 replay against Dagenham & Redbridge, televised live on BT Sport on 6 December 2015. In April 2016 Mills won the National League South player of the month award and was named in the league team of the season alongside teammates Sergio Torres and Nick Arnold, after finishing the season as The Hawks' top scorer with 22 league goals. In a 4–2 defeat at Truro City on 25 March 2017, Mills scored his 100th goal for the club in all competitions.

=== Ebbsfleet United ===
Mills joined Ebbsfleet United in June 2017. Mills, along with a number of other first-team players, was released by Ebbsfleet at the end of the 2018/19 season.

=== Dartford (loan) ===
On 1 December 2017, Mills signed on loan for Dartford until the end of January 2018, an arrangement which would subsequently be extended until the end of the 2017–18 season.

=== Welling United (loan) ===
On 20 July 2018, Mills signed on a season-long loan for Welling United.

=== Dulwich Hamlet ===
On 19 June 2019, Mills signed for Dulwich Hamlet.

== Career statistics ==
As of match played 27 April 2024

Appearances and goals by club, season and competition
| Club | Season | League | | | FA Cup | | League Cup | | Other | | Total | |
| Club | Season | Division | Apps | Goals | Apps | Goals | Apps | Goals | Apps | Goals | Apps | Goals |
|---|---|---|---|---|---|---|---|---|---|---|---|---|
| Crawley Town | 2008–09 | Conference Premier | 2 | 0 | 0 | 0 | — | | 0 | 0 | 2 | 0 |
| Peterborough United | 2009–10 | Championship | 3 | 0 | 0 | 0 | 0 | 0 | — | | 3 | 0 |
| Torquay United (loan) | 2009–10 | League Two | 2 | 0 | 0 | 0 | 0 | 0 | 0 | 0 | 2 | 0 |
| Rushden & Diamonds (loan) | 2009–10 | Conference Premier | 1 | 0 | 1 | 0 | — | | 0 | 0 | 2 | 0 |
| Histon (loan) | 2010–11 | Conference Premier | 18 | 1 | 1 | 0 | — | | 0 | 0 | 19 | 1 |
| Kettering Town (loan) | 2010–11 | Conference Premier | 17 | 6 | — | | — | | 0 | 0 | 17 | 6 |
| Tamworth (loan) | 2011–12 | Conference Premier | 20 | 3 | 2 | 0 | — | | 1 (Note: Appearances in the FA Trophy) | 0 | 23 | 3 |
| Kettering Town (loan) | 2011–12 | Conference Premier | 18 | 2 | — | | — | | 0 | 0 | 18 | 2 |
| Carshalton Athletic | 2012–13 | Isthmian Premier Division | 10 | 1 | ? | ? | — | | ? | ? | 10 | 1 |
| Whitehawk | 2012–13 | Isthmian Premier Division | ? | 12 | 0 | 0 | — | | 0 | 0 | ? | 12 |
| Whitehawk | 2013–14 | Conference South | 42 | 18 | 0 | 0 | — | | 3 | 2 | 45 | 20 |
| Whitehawk | 2014–15 | Conference South | 42 | 18 | 0 | 0 | — | | 0 | 0 | 42 | 18 |
| Whitehawk | 2015–16 | National League South | 44 | 25 | 4 | 3 | — | | 0 | 0 | 48 | 28 |
| Whitehawk | 2016–17 | National League South | 42 | 15 | 2 | 0 | — | | 3 | 1 | 47 | 16 |
| Whitehawk | | | 170+ | 88 | 6 | 3 | 0 | 0 | 6 | 3 | 182+ | 94 |
| Ebbsfleet United | 2017–18 | National League | 10 | 1 | 2 | 0 | — | | 0 | 0 | 12 | 1 |
| Dartford (loan) | 2017–18 | National League South | 23 | 6 | — | | — | | 3 (Note: Appearance in National League South Play-Offs) | 1 | 26 | 7 |
| Welling United (loan) | 2018–19 | National League South | 37 | 9 | 3 | 0 | — | | 7 (Note: Appearance(s) in London Senior Cup) | 4 | 47 | 13 |
| Dulwich Hamlet | 2019–20 | National League South | 31 | 13 | 3 | 2 | — | | 4 | 5 | 38 | 20 |
| Dulwich Hamlet | 2020–21 | National League South | 9 | 5 | 3 | 0 | — | | 2 | 1 | 13 | 6 |
| Dulwich Hamlet | 2021–22 | National League South | 37 | 13 | 1 | 0 | — | | 2 | 1 | 40 | 14 |
| Dulwich Hamlet | 2022–23 | National League South | 44 | 10 | 0 | 0 | — | | 1 | 1 | 45 | 11 |
| Dulwich Hamlet | 2023–24 | Isthmian League Premier Division | 39 | 13 | 2 | 0 | — | | 2 | 0 | 43 | 13 |
| Dulwich Hamlet | 2024–25 | Isthmian League Premier Division | 0 | 0 | 0 | 0 | — | | 0 | 0 | 0 | 0 |
| Dulwich Hamlet | Total | | 160 | 54 | 9 | 2 | 0 | 0 | 11 | 8 | 180 | 64 |
| Career total | | | 467 | 148 | 21 | 5 | 0 | 0 | 22 | 16 | 510 | 169 |

== Honours ==
Welling United

- London Senior Cup: 2018–19
