= Nick Arnold (footballer) =

English footballer (born 1993)

Personal information
- Full name: Nicholas Samuel Arnold
- Date of birth: 3 July 1993 (age 33)
- Place of birth: Tadley, England
- Height: 5 ft 11 in (1.80 m)
- Position: Right-back

Youth career
- 2007–2011: Reading

Senior career*
Years	Team	Apps	(Gls)
2011–2014	Reading	0	(0)
2013–2014	→ Wycombe Wanderers (loan)	31	(0)
2014	Woking	2	(0)
2014–2016	Whitehawk	63	(4)
2016–2019	Aldershot Town	38	(1)
2019–2020	Wealdstone	19	(0)
2020	Dartford	5	(0)
2020	Eastbourne Borough	0	(0)

International career^{‡}
2016–	England C	1	(0)
- * Club domestic league appearances and goals as of 18:10, 15 August 2020 (UTC) ‡ National team caps and goals as of 15 November 2016 (UTC)

Nicholas Samuel Arnold (born 3 July 1993) is an English footballer who most recently played as a right-back for National League South side Eastbourne Borough. He made his debut in the Football League in 2013.

== Club career ==
=== Reading ===
Arnold joined the Academy at Reading in 2007 and signed a scholarship agreement two years later before turning professional in 2011. He signed a new deal in summer 2012 before extending his contract for a further year on 14 June 2013.

After signing a new contract he immediately joined Wycombe Wanderers on a season-long loan and made his debut as a late substitute against Morecambe on 3 August. He made his full debut two weeks later, starting in the 1–0 home defeat to Mansfield Town. After 33 appearances in all competitions, he returned to Reading at the end of the season and was released by the club in May.

=== Woking ===
He trialled at Bradford City in the summer but did not join the club on a permanent basis and eventually signed for Conference Premier side Woking in August 2014. On 6 September 2014, Arnold made his Woking debut in a 3–1 home victory over Lincoln City, in which he replaced Chris Arthur with eight minutes remaining.

=== Whitehawk ===
After struggling to make an impression at Woking, Arnold joined Conference South side Whitehawk in October 2014. On 1 November 2014, Arnold made his Whitehawk debut in a 0–0 draw with Havant & Waterlooville, in which he played the full 90 minutes. On 20 December 2014, Arnold scored his first Whitehawk goal in a 2–0 away victory against Sutton United. Arnold played a key part in Whitehawk's playoff campaign, in which they were defeated 2–1 by Boreham Wood in the final through a goal from Junior Morias.

On 3 October 2015, Arnold scored his first goal of the 2015/16 campaign in a 6–0 home victory over St Albans City. On 8 May 2016, Arnold scored the opener in a play-off semi-final tie against Ebbsfleet United. The tie resulted in a 2–1 victory for Whitehawk therefore bringing it to a 3–3 result on aggregate. However, Whitehawk were unsuccessful once again in their promotion aim, with a 3–2 defeat on penalties. Arnold was named as right back in the Conference South league team of the season in both years he was at Whitehawk.

=== Aldershot Town ===
On 28 June 2016, Arnold joined National League side Aldershot Town on a one-year deal, after his contract at Whitehawk was set to expire. On 13 August 2016, Arnold made his Aldershot Town debut in a 2–0 victory against Wrexham, playing the full 90 minutes.

=== Wealdstone ===
In June 2019, Arnold joined Wealdstone.

=== Dartford ===
In January 2020, Arnold joined Dartford.

=== Eastbourne Borough ===
In October 2020, Arnold joined Eastbourne Borough.

== Career statistics ==
As of match played 15 August 2020.

Appearances and goals by club, season and competition
Club	Season	League			FA Cup		League Cup		Other		Total	
Club	Season	Division	Apps	Goals	Apps	Goals	Apps	Goals	Apps	Goals	Apps	Goals
Wycombe Wanderers (loan)	2013–14	League Two	31	0	0	0	0	0	2 (Note: Appearance(s) in Football League Trophy)	0	33	0
Woking	2014–15	Conference Premier	2	0	0	0	—		0	0	2	0
Whitehawk	2014–15	Conference South	26	2	0	0	—		3 (Note: Appearance(s) in Conference South play-offs)	0	29	2
Whitehawk	2015–16	National League South	37	2	4	0	—		2 (Note: Appearance(s) in National League South play-offs)	1	43	3
Whitehawk	Total		63	4	4	0	—		5	1	72	5
Aldershot Town	2016–17	National League	29	1	1	0	—		2 (Note: Appearance(s) in National League play-offs)	0	32	1
Aldershot Town	2017–18	National League	7	0	1	0	—		0	0	8	0
Aldershot Town	2018–19	National League	2	0	0	0	—		0	0	2	0
Aldershot Town	Total		38	1	2	0	—		2	0	42	1
Wealdstone	2019–20	National League South	19	0	3	0	—		2 (Note: One appearance in FA Trophy and one in Middlesex Senior Cup)	0	24	0
Dartford	2019–20	National League South	5	0	0	0	—		0	0	5	0
Eastbourne Borough	2020–21	National League South	0	0	1	0	—		0	0	1	0
Career total			158	5	10	0	0	0	11	1	179	6
