= 2016–17 National League =

National League
- Season: 2016–17

The 2016–17 National League season, known as the Vanarama National League for sponsorship reasons, was the second season under the new title of National League, thirteenth season consisting of three divisions and the thirty-eighth season overall.

The National League covers the top two levels of non-League football in England. The National League is the fifth highest level of the overall pyramid, while the National League North and National League South exist at the sixth level. The top team and the winner of the play-off of the Premier division will be promoted to League Two, while the bottom four are relegated to the North or South divisions. The champions of the North and South divisions will be promoted to the Premier division, alongside the play-off winners from each division. The bottom three in each of the North and South divisions are relegated to the premier divisions of the Northern Premier League, Isthmian League or Southern League. The fixtures were announced on 6 July 2016.

== National League ==
National League
- Season: 2016–17
- Champions: Lincoln City
- Promoted: Lincoln City; Forest Green Rovers
- Relegated: Braintree Town; North Ferriby United; Southport; York City
- Matches: 552
- Goals: 1,424 (2.58 per match)
- Top goalscorer: (England) Ricky Miller, Dover Athletic (40 goals)
- Biggest home win: Tranmere Rovers 9–0 Solihull Moors
- Biggest away win: Sutton United 0–6 Dover Athletic
- Highest scoring: Tranmere Rovers 9–0 Solihull Moors
- Longest winning run: Gateshead (7 matches)
- Longest unbeaten run: Lincoln City (13 matches)
- Longest winless run: Guiseley (13 matches)
- Longest losing run: North Ferriby United (8 matches)
- Highest attendance: 10,031 (Lincoln City v Macclesfield Town)
- Average attendance: 1,868

=== Promotion and relegation ===
The following teams changed divisions after the 2015–16 season. Solihull Moors were the first team to be promoted after North Ferriby United's 2–0 loss to Stalybridge Celtic on 13 April 2016 clinched them the National League North title. This will be their first season in the National League. Sutton United were promoted on 23 April 2016 after a 2–0 win over Chelmsford City, returning to the league for the first time in sixteen years.

Dagenham & Redbridge were relegated from League Two on 16 April 2016 after their 3–2 loss to Leyton Orient returning to the fifth tier after nine years in the Football League. York City were relegated on 23 April after their 3–0 loss to Accrington Stanley, returning to the league for the first time since the 2011–12 season. North Ferriby United's 2–1 win over AFC Fylde and Maidstone United's win on penalties over Ebbsfleet United made them the National League North and National League South play-off winners respectively. It is the first time both teams have competed in the league.

The six teams replace Cheltenham Town, Grimsby Town, FC Halifax Town, Altrincham, Kidderminster Harriers and Welling United. Cheltenham Town were promoted back to League Two at their first attempt after beating FC Halifax Town 2–0 on 16 April 2016. Grimsby Town were promoted back to the Football League after beating Forest Green Rovers 3–1 in the 2015–16 National League play-off final. Kidderminster Harriers and Welling United were relegated on the same day after defeats to Barrow and Chester.

On the final day of the season, Altrincham were relegated after losing 3–0 to Braintree Town, ending their two-year stay in the league. FC Halifax Town's 1–1 draw against Macclesfield Town was not enough to save them after Guiseley's 4–3 win over Torquay United, ending their three-year stay in the league.

=== Team changes ===
==== To National League ====
Promoted from 2015–16 National League North

- Solihull Moors
- North Ferriby United

Promoted from 2015–16 National League South

- Sutton United
- Maidstone United

Relegated from 2015–16 League Two

- Dagenham & Redbridge
- York City

==== From National League ====
Relegated to 2016–17 National League North

- FC Halifax Town
- Altrincham
- Kidderminster Harriers

Relegated to 2016–17 National League South

- Welling United

Promoted to 2016–17 League Two

- Cheltenham Town
- Grimsby Town

=== Stadia and locations ===
Locations of the 2016–17 National League clubs (Greater London shown in more detail below)
Locations of the 2016–17 National League clubs (Greater London)

Team	Location	Stadium	Capacity
Aldershot Town	Aldershot	Recreation Ground	7,100
Barrow	Barrow-in-Furness	Holker Street	5,045
Boreham Wood	Borehamwood	Meadow Park	4,502
Braintree Town	Braintree	Cressing Road	4,085
Bromley	London (Bromley)	Hayes Lane	5,300
Chester	Chester	Deva Stadium	6,500
Dagenham & Redbridge	London (Dagenham)	Victoria Road	6,078
Dover Athletic	Dover	Crabble Athletic Ground	5,885
Eastleigh	Eastleigh	Ten Acres	5,250
Forest Green Rovers	Nailsworth	The New Lawn	5,032
Gateshead	Gateshead	Gateshead International Stadium	11,800
Guiseley	Guiseley	Nethermoor Park	3,770
Lincoln City	Lincoln	Sincil Bank	10,120
Macclesfield Town	Macclesfield	Moss Rose	6,355
Maidstone United	Maidstone	Gallagher Stadium	4,200
North Ferriby United	North Ferriby	Grange Lane	2,200
Solihull Moors	Solihull	Damson Park	3,050
Southport	Southport	Haig Avenue	7,177
Sutton United	London (Sutton)	Gander Green Lane	5,013
Torquay United	Torquay	Plainmoor	6,500
Tranmere Rovers	Birkenhead	Prenton Park	16,789
Woking	Woking	Kingfield Stadium	6,036
Wrexham	Wrexham	Racecourse Ground	10,771
York City	York	Bootham Crescent	8,256

=== Managerial changes ===
Team	Outgoing manager	Manner of departure	Date of vacancy	Position in table	Incoming manager	Date of appointment
Eastleigh	Chris Todd	Dismissed	17 August 2016	24th	Ronnie Moore	19 August 2016
Guiseley	Mark Bower	Dismissed	21 August 2016	24th	Adam Lockwood	22 September 2016
Southport	Andy Bishop	Dismissed	3 September 2016	23rd	Steve Burr	8 September 2016
Tranmere Rovers	Gary Brabin	Dismissed	18 September 2016	5th	Paul Carden (Interim)	19 September 2016
Braintree Town	Jamie Day	Dismissed	25 September 2016	22nd	Hakan Hayrettin	27 September 2016
Tranmere Rovers	Paul Carden	End of Interim Spell	7 October 2016	9th	Micky Mellon	7 October 2016
Wrexham	Gary Mills	Dismissed	13 October 2016	15th	Dean Keates	25 October 2016
York City	Jackie McNamara	Became Chief Executive	16 October 2016	19th	Gary Mills	16 October 2016
Eastleigh	Ronnie Moore	Resigned	30 November 2016	9th	Martin Allen	1 December 2016
Southport	Steve Burr	Dismissed	30 January 2017	20th	Liam Watson (Interim)	30 January 2017
Eastleigh	Martin Allen	Dismissed	22 February 2017	15th	Richard Hill	22 February 2017

=== League table ===
Pos	Team	Pld	W	D	L	GF	GA	GD	Pts	Promotion, qualification or relegation
1	Lincoln City (C, P)	46	30	9	7	83	40	+43	99	Promotion to EFL League Two
2	Tranmere Rovers	46	29	8	9	79	39	+40	95	Qualification for the National League play-offs
3	Forest Green Rovers (O, P)	46	25	11	10	88	56	+32	86	Qualification for the National League play-offs
4	Dagenham & Redbridge	46	26	6	14	79	53	+26	84	Qualification for the National League play-offs
5	Aldershot Town	46	23	13	10	66	37	+29	82	Qualification for the National League play-offs
6	Dover Athletic	46	24	7	15	85	63	+22	79	
7	Barrow	46	20	15	11	72	53	+19	75	
8	Gateshead	46	19	13	14	72	51	+21	70	
9	Macclesfield Town	46	20	8	18	64	57	+7	68	
10	Bromley	46	18	8	20	59	66	−7	62	
11	Boreham Wood	46	15	13	18	49	48	+1	58	
12	Sutton United	46	15	13	18	61	63	−2	58	
13	Wrexham	46	15	13	18	47	61	−14	58	
14	Maidstone United	46	16	10	20	59	75	−16	58	
15	Eastleigh	46	14	15	17	56	63	−7	57	
16	Solihull Moors	46	15	10	21	62	75	−13	55	
17	Torquay United	46	14	11	21	54	61	−7	53	
18	Woking	46	14	11	21	66	80	−14	53	
19	Chester	46	14	10	22	63	71	−8	52	
20	Guiseley	46	13	12	21	50	67	−17	51	
21	York City (R)	46	11	17	18	55	70	−15	50	Relegation to National League North
22	Braintree Town (R)	46	13	9	24	51	76	−25	48	Relegation to National League South
23	Southport (R)	46	10	9	27	52	97	−45	39	Relegation to National League North
24	North Ferriby United (R)	46	12	3	31	32	82	−50	39	Relegation to National League North

Source: National League official site
Rules for classification: 1) Points; 2) Goal difference; 3) Number of goals scored; 4) Number of matches won; 5) Head-to-head results
(C) Champions; (O) Play-off winners; (P) Promoted; (R) Relegated

=== Results ===
Home \ Away	ALD	BRW	BOR	BRA	BRO	CHR	D&R	DOV	EAS	FGR	GAT	GUI	LIN	MAC	MDS	NFU	SOL	SOU	SUT	TOR	TRA	WOK	WRE	YOR
Aldershot Town		2–2	2–0	2–0	4–0	0–0	3–1	1–0	0–1	0–4	3–0	1–0	0–0	1–2	1–0	2–0	2–0	2–1	2–0	1–1	3–1	4–0	2–0	0–0
Barrow	1–0		1–1	2–1	1–1	3–2	2–1	2–3	4–0	2–3	0–0	3–0	3–0	1–1	3–0	3–1	2–1	0–1	0–0	0–0	2–1	2–2	1–1	2–0
Boreham Wood	1–1	1–1		0–1	0–0	1–1	1–3	5–0	0–1	1–0	0–4	0–0	2–0	2–4	0–1	1–0	0–0	2–0	1–0	2–0	0–1	2–1	0–1	1–1
Braintree Town	2–0	0–2	1–2		2–2	1–2	3–2	1–2	1–1	0–1	1–4	2–0	0–4	1–3	0–0	1–0	0–1	2–0	1–0	1–3	0–1	1–3	1–2	1–1
Bromley	2–2	4–1	1–0	0–5		0–1	1–3	0–2	0–5	1–5	3–2	1–1	1–1	0–1	2–0	3–0	0–1	3–1	1–0	1–0	0–2	2–1	4–3	3–0
Chester	2–0	1–2	0–2	1–0	1–1		3–0	5–0	0–1	1–2	1–2	2–0	2–5	2–3	1–3	3–0	0–3	2–2	4–0	1–0	2–3	2–3	1–1	0–2
Dagenham & Redbridge	1–0	1–4	0–2	3–0	2–1	3–2		2–0	4–0	2–1	0–5	1–2	1–0	1–1	0–2	2–0	4–4	3–0	2–2	0–1	0–0	1–1	3–0	1–0
Dover Athletic	1–2	3–1	1–4	6–1	1–0	3–1	1–2		3–0	4–3	2–0	2–0	2–0	2–2	1–1	2–0	0–0	3–0	3–1	1–2	1–4	3–1	1–1	2–2
Eastleigh	1–1	2–0	2–2	0–2	2–1	0–3	0–1	2–4		1–1	1–1	2–1	0–1	0–1	3–0	2–0	2–0	1–1	2–1	3–0	0–2	0–1	1–1	1–1
Forest Green Rovers	2–1	0–0	2–0	1–1	1–0	2–0	1–1	1–1	1–1		1–0	3–0	2–3	3–0	2–2	0–1	2–1	5–1	1–1	5–5	2–2	4–3	3–0	2–1
Gateshead	1–1	4–1	1–1	1–1	0–2	3–0	1–0	4–2	2–2	3–1		1–1	1–2	1–1	1–2	0–1	0–0	3–0	1–0	0–0	0–1	2–1	2–2	6–1
Guiseley	1–0	1–0	3–1	0–0	1–4	1–1	0–2	0–4	1–1	0–1	1–1		2–1	1–2	2–1	1–2	1–1	2–1	2–1	2–0	1–2	1–1	2–3	6–1
Lincoln City	3–3	1–2	2–0	3–0	1–0	1–0	2–0	2–0	0–0	3–1	3–0	3–1		2–1	2–0	6–1	0–0	4–0	1–3	2–1	2–1	3–2	1–0	1–1
Macclesfield Town	0–2	0–1	0–2	2–0	1–2	0–0	1–4	2–1	0–1	0–1	1–1	1–2	1–2		3–0	1–0	1–3	3–1	0–0	2–0	4–2	3–1	3–0	1–3
Maidstone United	0–2	2–1	1–0	2–1	0–2	4–2	0–1	1–4	2–1	1–4	0–2	1–1	0–0	2–1		1–2	2–4	4–2	1–1	2–1	0–1	0–3	2–2	1–1
North Ferriby United	0–3	0–1	2–4	0–0	1–2	0–1	0–4	1–2	2–1	0–3	1–0	3–2	0–1	0–2	0–2		1–4	0–1	2–1	1–0	1–4	2–1	0–0	0–1
Solihull Moors	0–2	2–4	1–1	3–3	1–0	3–2	2–5	2–3	2–0	0–1	0–2	3–2	0–1	2–3	2–0	2–0		4–0	3–0	0–1	0–3	2–2	0–1	1–2
Southport	1–1	1–4	1–0	4–5	1–2	0–1	1–4	0–1	4–3	2–0	0–3	0–1	1–1	1–2	3–2	2–4	0–0		1–1	1–2	1–1	2–1	3–2	2–0
Sutton United	2–0	0–0	1–0	1–2	2–0	5–2	1–0	0–6	1–1	1–2	3–0	1–0	1–1	2–0	2–2	5–1	1–3	2–2		2–0	1–0	4–1	1–0	2–2
Torquay United	0–0	1–1	0–1	3–1	1–0	0–1	1–0	2–1	2–3	4–3	3–1	1–2	1–2	1–1	2–3	2–0	3–0	1–2	2–3		0–0	1–2	1–1	2–0
Tranmere Rovers	2–2	2–0	2–1	1–0	2–2	2–2	0–2	1–0	2–1	0–1	0–1	1–0	0–1	1–0	2–1	1–0	9–0	4–1	3–2	2–1		3–1	2–0	1–0
Woking	1–2	1–1	0–0	2–3	2–1	3–1	1–3	1–0	3–3	0–1	3–0	0–0	1–3	1–0	2–4	1–1	2–1	0–0	2–1	3–1	0–3		2–0	1–1
Wrexham	0–2	2–2	2–1	0–1	2–1	0–0	0–1	0–0	0–0	3–1	0–2	3–1	1–2	0–3	1–3	1–0	1–0	1–0	1–0	1–1	0–1	2–1		2–1
York City	0–1	2–1	1–1	3–0	0–2	1–1	0–2	0–1	3–1	2–2	1–3	1–1	1–4	1–0	1–1	0–1	4–0	5–3	2–2	0–0	0–0	4–1	1–3	

Updated to match(es) played on 29 April 2017. Source: The National League
Legend: Blue = home team win; Yellow = draw; Red = away team win.

=== Play-offs ===
Semi-finals
2	Tranmere Rovers	3	2	5
5	Aldershot Town	0	2	2
3	Forest Green Rovers	1	2	3
4	Dagenham & Redbridge	1	0	1

Final
2	Tranmere Rovers	1
3	Forest Green Rovers	3

==== First leg ====
3 May 2017	Aldershot Town	0–3	Tranmere Rovers	Recreation Ground, Aldershot
19:00		Report	Stockton 3', 75'; Norwood 48'	Attendance: 5,614; Referee: Craig Hicks

4 May 2017	Dagenham & Redbridge	1–1	Forest Green Rovers	Victoria Road, Dagenham
19:00	Maguire-Drew 45+'	Report	Noble 29' (pen.)	Attendance: 2,208; Referee: Anthony Coggins

==== Second leg ====
6 May 2017	Tranmere Rovers	2–2 (5–2 agg.)	Aldershot Town	Prenton Park, Birkenhead
12:15	Stockton 20'; Norwood 90+4'	Report	Mensah 43'; Hughes 50' (o.g.)	Attendance: 10,241; Referee: Scott Oldham

7 May 2017	Forest Green Rovers	2–0 (3–1 agg.)	Dagenham & Redbridge	The New Lawn, Nailsworth
15:00	Doidge 34'; Marsh-Brown 45'	Report		Attendance: 3,237; Referee: Martin Coy

==== Final ====
14 May 2017	Tranmere Rovers	1–3	Forest Green Rovers	Wembley Stadium, London
15:00	Jennings 22'	Report	Woolery 12', 44'; Doidge 41'	Attendance: 18,801; Referee: Anthony Backhouse

=== Top scorers ===
As of matches played 29 April 2017

Rank	Player	Club	Goals
1	(England) Ricky Miller	Dover Athletic	40
2	(Wales) Christian Doidge	Forest Green Rovers	25
3	(England) Andy Cook	Tranmere Rovers	23
4	(England) Michael Cheek	Braintree Town	19
4	(England) Byron Harrison	Barrow	19
5	(England) Oliver Hawkins	Dagenham & Redbridge	18
5	(England) Danny Johnson	Gateshead	18
8	(England) James Alabi	Chester	17
8	(England) Gozie Ugwu	Woking	17
9	(England) Richie Bennett	Barrow	15
9	(England) Matt Rhead	Lincoln City	15
9	(England) Corey Whitely	Dagenham & Redbridge	15

== National League North ==
National League North
- Season: 2016–17
- Champions: AFC Fylde
- Promoted: AFC Fylde; FC Halifax Town
- Relegated: Altrincham; Stalybridge Celtic; Worcester City

=== Team changes ===
==== To National League North ====
Promoted from 2015–16 Northern Premier League Premier Division

- Darlington 1883
- Salford City

Relegated from 2015–16 National League

- FC Halifax Town
- Altrincham
- Kidderminster Harriers

==== From National League North ====
Relegated to 2016–17 Northern Premier League Premier Division

- Corby Town
- Hednesford Town

Relegated to 2016–17 Isthmian League Premier Division

- Lowestoft Town

Promoted to 2016–17 National League

- Solihull Moors
- North Ferriby United

=== Stadia and locations ===
Locations of the 2016–17 National League North clubs (Greater Manchester shown in more detail below)
Locations of the 2016–17 National League North clubs (Greater Manchester)

Team	Stadium	Capacity
AFC Fylde	Mill Farm Sports Village	6,000
AFC Telford United	New Bucks Head	6,300
Alfreton Town	North Street	3,600
Altrincham	Moss Lane	6,085
Boston United	York Street	6,643
Brackley Town	St. James Park	3,500
Bradford Park Avenue	Horsfall Stadium	3,500
Chorley	Victory Park	4,100
Curzon Ashton	Tameside Stadium	4,000
Darlington 1883	Blackwell Meadows	3,000
FC Halifax Town	The Shay	14,061
F.C. United of Manchester	Broadhurst Park	4,400
Gainsborough Trinity	The Northolme	4,304
Gloucester City	Whaddon Road (groundshare with Cheltenham Town)	7,066
Harrogate Town	Wetherby Road	3,800
Kidderminster Harriers	Aggborough Stadium	6,238
Nuneaton Town	Liberty Way	4,314
Salford City	Moor Lane	5,106
Stalybridge Celtic	Bower Fold	6,500
Stockport County	Edgeley Park	10,852
Tamworth	The Lamb Ground	4,000
Worcester City	Victoria Ground (groundshare with Bromsgrove Sporting)	4,895

=== League table ===
Pos	Team	Pld	W	D	L	GF	GA	GD	Pts	Promotion, qualification or relegation
1	AFC Fylde (C, P)	42	26	10	6	109	60	+49	88	Promotion to National League
2	Kidderminster Harriers	42	25	7	10	76	41	+35	82	Qualification for the National League North play-offs
3	FC Halifax Town (O, P)	42	24	8	10	81	43	+38	80	Qualification for the National League North play-offs
4	Salford City	42	22	11	9	79	44	+35	77	Qualification for the National League North play-offs
5	Darlington 1883	42	22	10	10	89	67	+22	76	(Note: Darlington 1883 were barred from the play-offs due to failing ground size regulations.)
6	Chorley	42	20	14	8	60	41	+19	74	Qualification for the National League North play-offs
7	Brackley Town	42	20	13	9	66	43	+23	73	
8	Stockport County	42	19	16	7	59	41	+18	73	
9	Tamworth	42	21	6	15	73	67	+6	69	
10	Gloucester City	42	18	10	14	69	61	+8	64	Transferred to National League South
11	Harrogate Town	42	16	11	15	71	63	+8	59	
12	Nuneaton Town	42	14	13	15	67	69	−2	55	
13	FC United of Manchester	42	14	12	16	69	68	+1	54	
14	Curzon Ashton	42	14	10	18	63	72	−9	52	
15	Boston United	42	12	11	19	54	72	−18	47	
16	Bradford (Park Avenue)	42	12	7	23	46	74	−28	43	
17	AFC Telford United	42	10	12	20	38	57	−19	42	
18	Alfreton Town	42	11	9	22	62	95	−33	42	
19	Gainsborough Trinity	42	8	12	22	51	84	−33	36	
20	Worcester City (R)	42	7	14	21	44	63	−19	35	Relegation to the Midland League Premier Division (Note: Worcester were relegated, and took a further voluntary demotion to the Midland League for financial reasons.)
21	Stalybridge Celtic (R)	42	8	5	29	40	89	−49	29	Relegation to the Northern Premier League Premier Division
22	Altrincham (R)	42	4	9	29	39	91	−52	21	Relegation to the Northern Premier League Premier Division

Source: National League official site
Rules for classification: 1) Points; 2) Goal difference; 3) Number of goals scored; 4) Number of matches won; 5) Head-to-head results
(C) Champions; (O) Play-off winners; (P) Promoted; (R) Relegated

=== Results ===
Home \ Away	FYL	TEL	ALF	ALT	BOS	BRK	BPA	CHO	CZA	DAR	HAL	FCU	GAI	GLO	HAR	KID	NUN	SLC	STL	STP	TAM	WRC
AFC Fylde		1–1	2–0	4–1	9–2	1–1	1–1	0–2	4–1	4–1	3–2	3–1	3–1	2–2	2–1	2–2	2–1	3–3	5–0	0–0	3–1	4–2
AFC Telford United	0–1		1–1	1–0	1–2	0–6	1–3	0–0	3–1	2–0	1–2	1–0	1–0	0–2	0–0	1–0	2–4	0–2	2–0	0–0	1–0	1–0
Alfreton Town	3–5	3–2		3–2	1–0	0–0	0–1	2–2	0–1	0–3	1–0	2–1	4–0	0–2	1–0	3–3	3–3	1–1	0–2	1–1	2–5	0–0
Altrincham	0–6	0–2	1–1		0–1	1–3	2–3	2–2	2–4	2–2	0–1	0–3	2–3	0–1	0–0	1–4	1–3	0–2	0–0	2–3	1–2	2–0
Boston United	0–3	3–0	3–2	0–1		2–3	1–0	3–1	3–1	1–2	1–4	2–3	1–1	2–2	0–3	1–1	1–3	2–0	0–1	0–2	3–0	0–0
Brackley Town	1–3	2–1	2–3	1–1	0–0		2–0	0–1	2–0	2–2	0–0	1–0	0–0	3–0	2–1	2–0	2–1	0–1	5–2	0–3	0–0	0–2
Bradford Park Avenue	1–4	1–1	1–0	2–1	0–2	2–1		0–3	4–4	1–2	1–3	0–0	5–1	0–1	2–3	1–3	1–1	0–2	0–1	0–2	0–0	0–3
Chorley	1–3	2–1	2–1	2–0	2–0	1–1	3–0		0–3	1–1	0–2	3–3	4–0	4–1	1–0	2–1	1–0	2–1	1–0	0–1	1–1	1–0
Curzon Ashton	3–2	1–1	5–0	2–3	4–2	0–0	1–2	1–1		1–2	4–2	1–2	1–2	0–0	1–0	1–6	2–1	0–2	0–0	1–2	1–5	1–1
Darlington 1883	1–1	1–0	3–4	3–1	4–1	1–0	1–0	2–0	1–3		3–2	4–2	5–2	2–0	2–3	0–1	1–2	2–2	4–1	2–1	3–2	5–1
FC Halifax Town	0–1	1–1	1–0	2–2	0–0	1–3	4–0	2–1	3–0	2–2		3–1	2–1	0–1	0–1	2–0	2–0	4–2	1–0	0–0	4–0	3–0
F.C. United of Manchester	2–3	0–0	4–3	1–1	1–1	1–2	2–3	3–3	0–0	2–3	0–3		5–1	2–4	2–2	1–0	3–0	0–3	2–2	2–0	1–0	1–1
Gainsborough Trinity	1–2	3–1	0–2	2–0	1–2	1–1	1–1	0–2	0–1	3–3	3–2	1–2		1–1	0–2	1–1	2–2	1–0	2–2	0–1	3–2	1–1
Gloucester City	1–5	3–0	4–0	5–0	3–1	1–3	1–0	2–2	0–2	1–2	0–2	2–3	4–1		1–1	1–2	2–2	3–2	2–1	0–1	2–0	3–0
Harrogate Town	3–3	2–1	6–3	2–2	2–0	1–2	1–0	2–1	2–2	1–4	0–3	3–1	1–3	3–1		0–2	3–1	3–3	3–1	0–1	3–4	3–0
Kidderminster Harriers	3–3	1–0	3–0	1–0	1–0	1–2	3–1	0–0	3–2	2–1	1–2	0–2	3–0	3–0	1–0		4–0	1–0	2–1	2–0	6–0	2–1
Nuneaton Town	4–1	1–1	4–1	4–1	2–2	2–2	1–2	1–1	0–1	1–1	2–3	1–4	2–1	1–1	2–1	0–2		0–1	2–1	1–1	1–0	1–1
Salford City	5–0	2–1	4–1	2–1	3–3	1–1	1–0	1–1	1–0	5–1	2–2	1–0	3–2	1–1	0–0	3–0	4–0		1–0	1–1	1–2	3–0
Stalybridge Celtic	2–1	0–2	2–3	0–2	3–3	0–1	4–3	0–1	1–2	0–1	1–0	2–4	3–2	1–3	2–4	1–0	0–4	0–4		1–3	0–4	0–1
Stockport County	1–2	1–1	4–3	3–0	1–1	2–4	1–2	0–0	3–1	3–3	1–1	2–1	1–0	1–1	1–1	0–1	1–1	2–1	3–1		2–1	1–0
Tamworth	1–0	2–1	4–1	2–1	1–0	2–1	5–1	0–1	3–2	2–1	2–6	1–1	1–0	3–1	3–2	3–4	1–2	2–0	2–1	2–2		1–0
Worcester City	1–2	2–1	5–3	3–0	0–2	1–2	0–1	0–1	1–1	2–2	1–2	0–0	2–2	2–3	2–2	0–0	2–3	1–2	4–0	0–0	1–1	

Updated to match(es) played on 29 April 2017. Source: The National League
Legend: Blue = home team win; Yellow = draw; Red = away team win.

=== Play-offs ===
Semi-finals
2	Kidderminster Harriers	1	0	1
6	Chorley	0	2	2
3	FC Halifax Town	1	1	2 (3)
4	Salford City	1	1	2 (0)

Final
6	Chorley	1
3	FC Halifax Town	2

==== First leg ====
3 May 2017	Chorley	0–1	Kidderminster Harriers	Victory Park, Chorley
19:45			Gnahoua 76'	Attendance: 2,487

3 May 2017	Salford City	1–1	FC Halifax Town	Moor Lane, Salford
19:45	Poole 86'		Peniket 37'	Attendance: 2,175

==== Second leg ====
7 May 2017	Kidderminster Harriers	0–2 (1–2 agg.)	Chorley	Aggborough Stadium, Kidderminster
15:00			Carver 19'; Roscoe 90+2'	Attendance: 3,407

7 May 2017	FC Halifax Town	1–1 (a.e.t.) (2–2 agg.) (3–0 p)	Salford City	The Shay, Halifax
15:00	Peniket 97'		Nottingham 107'	Attendance: 3,655
	Penalties
	Kosylo (penalty scored); Peniket (penalty missed); Sinnott (penalty scored); Brown (penalty scored)		(penalty missed) Poole; (penalty missed) Allen; (penalty missed) Walker

==== Final ====
13 May 2017	FC Halifax Town	2–1 (a.e.t.)	Chorley	The Shay, Halifax
15:00	Roberts 46'; Garner 103'	Report	Blakeman 60'	Attendance: 7,920

=== Top scorers ===
As of matches played 29 April 2017

Rank	Player	Club	Goals
1	(England) Danny Rowe	AFC Fylde	47
2	(England) Danny Newton	Tamworth	28
3	(England) Simon Ainge	Harrogate Town	22
4	(England) Danny Lloyd	Stockport County	21
5	(England) Joe Ironside	Nuneaton Town	20
6	(England) Luke Hopper	Gloucester City	19
7	(England) Dan Bradley	AFC Fylde	18
7	(Scotland) Mark Beck	Darlington 1883	18
9	(England) Tom Denton	FC Halifax Town	17

== National League South ==
National League South
- Season: 2016–17
- Champions: Maidenhead United
- Promoted: Maidenhead United; Ebbsfleet United
- Relegated: Bishop's Stortford; Gosport Borough; Margate

=== Team changes ===
==== To National League South ====
Promoted from 2015–16 Isthmian League Premier Division

- Hampton & Richmond Borough
- East Thurrock United

Promoted from 2015–16 Southern League Premier Division

- Poole Town
- Hungerford Town

Relegated from 2015–16 National League

- Welling United

==== From National League South ====
Relegated to 2016–17 Isthmian League Premier Division

- Havant & Waterlooville

Relegated to 2016–17 Southern League Premier Division

- Hayes & Yeading United
- Basingstoke Town

Promoted to 2016–17 National League

- Sutton United
- Maidstone United

=== Stadia and locations ===
Locations of the 2016–17 National League South clubs (Greater London clubs shown in more detail below)
Locations of the 2016–17 National League South clubs (Greater London)

Team	Stadium	Capacity
Bath City	Twerton Park	8,840
Bishop's Stortford	Woodside Park	4,525
Chelmsford City	Melbourne Stadium	3,019
Concord Rangers	Thames Road	3,300
Dartford	Princes Park	4,100
Eastbourne Borough	Priory Lane	4,151
East Thurrock United	Rookery Hill	4,000
Ebbsfleet United	Stonebridge Road	5,011
Gosport Borough	Privett Park	4,500
Hampton & Richmond	Beveree Stadium	3,500
Hemel Hempstead Town	Vauxhall Road	3,152
Hungerford Town	Bulpit Lane	2,500
Maidenhead United	York Road	3,000
Margate	Hartsdown Park	3,000
Oxford City	Court Place Farm	2,000
Poole Town	Tatnam Ground	2,500
St Albans City	Clarence Park	4,500
Truro City	Treyew Road	3,857
Wealdstone	Grosvenor Vale	3,607
Welling United	Park View Road	4,000
Weston-super-Mare	Woodspring Stadium	3,500
Whitehawk	The Enclosed Ground	2,175

=== League table ===
Pos	Team	Pld	W	D	L	GF	GA	GD	Pts	Promotion, qualification or relegation
1	Maidenhead United (C, P)	42	30	8	4	93	29	+64	98	Promotion to National League
2	Ebbsfleet United (O, P)	42	29	9	4	96	30	+66	96	Qualification for the National League South play-offs
3	Dartford	42	25	9	8	83	45	+38	84	Qualification for the National League South play-offs
4	Chelmsford City	42	23	13	6	89	47	+42	82	Qualification for the National League South play-offs
5	Poole Town	42	20	11	11	63	49	+14	71	(Note: Hungerford Town and Poole Town were barred from the play-offs due to failing ground size regulations.)
6	Hungerford Town	42	19	13	10	67	49	+18	70	(Note: Hungerford Town and Poole Town were barred from the play-offs due to failing ground size regulations.)
7	Hampton & Richmond Borough	42	19	12	11	81	56	+25	69	Qualification for the National League South play-offs
8	Wealdstone	42	18	12	12	62	58	+4	66	
9	Bath City	42	18	8	16	71	52	+19	62	
10	St Albans City	42	16	11	15	72	66	+6	59	
11	Eastbourne Borough	42	16	10	16	82	70	+12	58	
12	Hemel Hempstead Town	42	15	12	15	74	83	−9	57	
13	East Thurrock United	42	14	14	14	73	65	+8	56	
14	Oxford City	42	15	7	20	48	73	−25	52	
15	Weston-super-Mare	42	14	6	22	63	69	−6	48	
16	Welling United	42	12	7	23	64	69	−5	43	
17	Whitehawk	42	12	7	23	51	72	−21	43	
18	Concord Rangers	42	10	12	20	57	75	−18	42	
19	Truro City	42	11	7	24	53	99	−46	40	
20	Gosport Borough (R)	42	9	9	24	45	101	−56	36	Relegation to the Southern League Premier Division
21	Bishop's Stortford (R)	42	8	3	31	29	104	−75	27	Relegation to the Southern League Premier Division
22	Margate (R)	42	7	4	31	26	81	−55	25	Relegation to the Isthmian League Premier Division

Source: National League official site
Rules for classification: 1) Points; 2) Goal difference; 3) Number of goals scored; 4) Number of matches won; 5) Head-to-head results
(C) Champions; (O) Play-off winners; (P) Promoted; (R) Relegated

=== Results ===
Home \ Away	BAT	BST	CHE	CON	DAR	EAB	ETU	EBB	GOS	H&R	HEM	HUN	MDH	MAR	OXC	POO	SAC	TRU	WEA	WEL	WSM	WHI
Bath City		2–0	2–2	2–2	0–1	1–1	2–1	0–1	4–0	1–1	6–0	1–1	1–5	2–0	1–3	3–0	3–0	4–0	1–2	2–1	1–2	2–1
Bishop's Stortford	0–1		1–3	1–0	0–3	1–4	0–4	0–3	0–2	0–1	0–4	1–2	0–2	0–2	0–2	1–4	1–5	4–0	0–3	2–2	2–1	0–3
Chelmsford City	3–1	4–0		4–3	1–1	5–1	2–2	2–1	5–1	2–2	4–4	3–3	0–1	2–0	2–0	3–0	1–1	2–0	4–1	3–1	1–0	1–0
Concord Rangers	0–5	0–0	2–2		1–1	3–1	1–1	0–1	2–2	2–1	2–0	2–4	0–1	0–0	3–3	3–2	3–2	0–2	0–1	0–5	1–3	3–0
Dartford	2–0	4–0	0–1	2–1		4–3	6–1	2–1	0–0	3–1	2–0	2–0	0–0	4–0	1–0	2–1	0–2	5–3	2–2	2–1	3–2	3–1
Eastbourne Borough	1–2	1–0	1–5	2–1	2–3		4–0	0–0	2–0	2–2	3–0	2–2	1–2	2–1	4–0	0–0	3–2	2–0	5–1	7–3	3–4	4–2
East Thurrock United	2–0	2–2	1–2	1–1	1–1	1–1		1–1	5–1	2–1	2–3	0–1	0–0	1–0	2–1	1–2	1–1	5–1	1–1	1–1	5–1	2–3
Ebbsfleet United	1–0	8–0	2–0	4–0	1–0	4–1	6–1		2–0	1–1	2–2	1–0	2–3	4–0	1–0	4–0	3–1	4–2	4–1	5–1	2–1	1–1
Gosport Borough	1–0	0–1	0–6	2–5	0–4	3–1	1–5	1–0		1–1	0–6	1–4	0–2	1–0	0–1	0–2	4–0	3–1	1–3	1–1	1–1	2–3
Hampton & Richmond	2–1	4–1	0–2	1–0	4–1	3–1	1–2	1–1	2–2		3–3	2–0	2–3	1–0	0–1	0–2	4–0	2–2	1–1	3–1	0–2	0–2
Hemel Hempstead Town	3–3	3–2	2–2	2–1	2–2	0–4	1–1	1–1	1–2	1–0		2–0	2–1	3–2	2–0	2–4	2–2	0–1	1–3	2–0	0–5	2–0
Hungerford Town	2–2	2–0	1–1	2–1	2–0	0–2	3–0	1–1	3–3	1–3	3–0		1–1	1–0	2–0	0–1	0–0	5–0	2–0	1–0	2–1	3–1
Maidenhead United	2–1	6–0	1–0	2–0	5–0	2–1	2–1	1–2	3–0	0–0	5–0	2–2		2–0	6–1	1–1	1–1	2–0	2–0	3–0	3–0	2–1
Margate	1–0	0–3	0–2	1–5	0–2	1–1	2–1	0–1	2–0	2–4	2–1	1–1	0–3		0–5	0–2	0–2	2–1	0–1	0–3	3–1	0–2
Oxford City	1–1	3–1	2–0	2–2	1–1	1–0	0–1	1–3	1–2	0–5	1–0	0–6	1–3	1–0		0–1	2–1	1–1	0–3	2–1	0–0	1–0
Poole Town	1–0	1–0	4–0	2–1	2–3	1–1	1–1	0–2	7–0	3–3	1–1	1–1	1–0	1–0	1–3		1–0	2–0	1–1	2–1	2–0	3–1
St Albans City	1–4	0–1	2–1	2–0	1–0	1–0	2–2	0–3	2–1	2–4	2–2	5–0	2–2	1–1	2–4	4–0		5–0	0–3	3–2	3–0	3–1
Truro City	1–3	1–2	2–2	1–2	0–5	2–2	0–6	1–1	2–0	0–3	2–1	2–0	0–3	2–0	3–2	0–0	3–2		1–2	1–1	1–2	4–2
Wealdstone	0–1	5–0	1–1	1–1	0–4	1–4	1–0	2–4	2–1	2–4	1–1	3–0	2–1	2–1	1–1	2–2	2–2	1–2		0–1	1–0	0–0
Welling United	3–1	1–2	0–2	3–1	0–0	3–1	2–0	1–2	4–0	1–2	2–3	0–0	1–2	5–1	4–0	2–1	0–1	3–2	0–1		0–2	1–2
Weston-super-Mare	1–2	5–0	0–0	1–2	1–2	2–0	1–3	0–2	1–1	1–3	3–5	0–1	1–3	3–1	3–0	0–0	0–3	4–2	1–2	2–2		3–1
Whitehawk	0–2	1–0	0–1	0–0	1–0	1–1	2–3	0–3	4–4	1–3	1–4	1–2	1–2	2–0	3–0	2–0	1–1	2–4	0–0	1–0	0–2	

Updated to match(es) played on 29 April 2017. Source: The National League Official Website
Legend: Blue = home team win; Yellow = draw; Red = away team win.

=== Play-offs ===
Semi-finals
2	Ebbsfleet United	2	2	4
7	Hampton & Richmond Borough	1	1	2
3	Dartford	0	1	1
4	Chelmsford City	0	2	2

Final
2	Ebbsfleet United	2
4	Chelmsford City	1

==== First leg ====
3 May 2017	Hampton & Richmond Borough	1–2	Ebbsfleet United	Beveree Stadium, Hampton
19:45	Culley 45'		Rance 6'; McLean 43' (pen.)	Attendance: 1,689

3 May 2017	Chelmsford City	0–0	Dartford	Melbourne Stadium, Chelmsford
19:45				Attendance: 1,653

==== Second leg ====
7 May 2017	Ebbsfleet United	2–1 (4–2 agg.)	Hampton & Richmond Borough	Stonebridge Road, Northfleet
15:00	Clark 37'; McQueen 89'	Report	Federico 61'	Attendance: 2,102; Referee: Alan Dale

7 May 2017	Dartford	1–2 (1–2 agg.)	Chelmsford City	Princes Park, Dartford
15:00	Ofori-Acheampong 90+3'	Report	Theophanous 70'; Dickson 85'	Attendance: 2,622; Referee: Gary Parsons

==== Final ====
13 May 2017	Ebbsfleet United	2–1	Chelmsford City	Stonebridge Road, Northfleet
15:00	Winfield 72'; McQueen 76'	Report	Graham 55'	Attendance: 3,134; Referee: Richard Hulme

=== Top scorers ===
As of matches played 29 April 2017

Rank	Player	Club	Goals
1	(England) Dave Tarpey	Maidenhead United	44
2	(England) Jake Robinson	Hemel Hempstead Town	25
3	(England) Shaun Jeffers	Chelmsford City	21
4	(England) Adam Coombes	Welling United	20
4	(England) Elliott Romain	Eastbourne Borough	20
5	(England) Dayle Grubb	Weston-super-Mare	19
5	(England) Tom Wraight	East Thurrock United	19
8	(England) Steve Cawley	Concord Rangers	18
9	(England) Bradley Ash	Weston-super-Mare	16
9	(England) Elliot Benyon	Wealdstone	16
9	(England) Nicke Kabamba	Hampton & Richmond Borough	16
9	(England) Sean Marks	Maidenhead United	16
9	(England) Danny Mills	Whitehawk	16
