= Joe Knowles (footballer, born 1872) =

English footballer

Personal information
- Full name: Joseph Knowles
- Date of birth: 16 December 1872
- Place of birth: Monkwearmouth, England
- Date of death: 1955 (aged 83–84)
- Position: Full-back

Senior career*
| Years | Team | Apps | (Gls) |
| 1892–1896 | Monkwearmouth F.C. | | |
| 1896–1897 | Sunderland | 1 | (0) |
| 1897–1898 | Tottenham Hotspur | 19 | (0) |
| 1898–1899 | South Shields | | |
| 1899–1900 | Queen's Park Rangers | 29 | |
- * Club domestic league appearances and goals

Joseph Knowles (16 December 1872 – 1955) was an English professional footballer who played as a full-back for Sunderland.

== Career ==
Knowles started his career with Monkwearmouth before signing to Sunderland. He was at the club for two years and only made a single Football League appearances. He joined Tottenham Hotspur for the beginning of the 1897–98 season. His league debut for Spurs was the first game of the season against Sheppey United in the Southern League. After the season had finished he was released by the club.

He was part of the Queens Park Rangers team that beat Wolverhampton Wanderers, who were playing in the First Division, 1-0 in the FA Cup in a first round replay on 31 January 1900.
