= Jimmy Davidson (footballer, born 1873) =

Scottish footballer

Personal information
- Full name: James Wilkie Davidson
- Date of birth: 25 October 1873
- Place of birth: Edinburgh, Scotland
- Date of death: Unknown
- Height: 5 ft 7 in (1.70 m)
- Position: Inside forward

Senior career*
| Years | Team | Apps | (Gls) |
- Celtic
| 1895–1897 | Burnley | 20 | (2) |
| 1897 | → Lincoln City (loan) | 9 | (1) |
| 1897–1898 | Tottenham Hotspur | 17 | (5) |
| 1898–1899 | Brighton United | | |
| 1899–1902 | Burnley | 45 | (5) |
- * Club domestic league appearances and goals

James Wilkie Davidson (25 October 1873 – unknown) was a Scottish professional association footballer who played as an inside forward.

== Career ==
Davidson started his career at Celtic before moving to Burnley. In March 1897 Davidson also had a loan spell with Lincoln City. He helped Lincoln win the Lincolnshire Cup at the end of the season. Then in May 1897 he signed to Tottenham Hotspur for one season. On 4 September 1897 Davidson made his debut in a Southern League away game against Sheppey United which finished in a 3–3 draw. Davidson played regularly in the Southern and United League but didn't have his contract renewed at the end of the season and thus moved to Brighton United. After two years at Brighton he returned to Burnley.

== Honours ==
Lincoln City

- Lincolnshire Cup: 1897

== Appearances ==
Appearances and goals by club, season and competition
| Club | Season | Southern League | | United League | | FA Cup | | Other | | Total | |
| Club | Season | Apps | Goals | Apps | Goals | Apps | Goals | Apps | Goals | Apps | Goals |
|---|---|---|---|---|---|---|---|---|---|---|---|
| Tottenham Hotspur | 1897–98 | 17 | 5 | 13 | 1 | 0 | 0 | 16 | 9 | 46 | 15 |
