= Jack Montgomery (footballer) =

Scottish footballer

Personal information
- Full name: John Montgomery
- Date of birth: 18 June 1876
- Place of birth: Chryston, Scotland
- Date of death: 1940 (aged 63–64)
- Position: Full back

Senior career*
Years	Team	Apps	(Gls)
1895–1898	Tottenham Hotspur		
1898–1911	Notts County	316	(2)
Total		316	(2)
- * Club domestic league appearances and goals

John Montgomery (18 June 1876 – 1940) was a Scottish footballer who played in the Football League for Notts County.
