= Lycurgus Burrows =

English footballer (1875–1952)

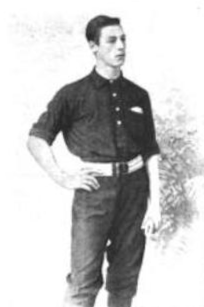
- In The Sketch, 22 April 1896

Personal information
- Date of birth: 26 June 1875
- Place of birth: Ashton-under-Lyne, Lancashire, England
- Date of death: 23 August 1952 (aged 77)
- Place of death: Gosforth, England
- Position: Full back

Youth career
- Melrose
- Woolwich Polytechnic

Senior career*
Years	Team	Apps	(Gls)
1892–1896	Woolwich Arsenal	10	(0)
1894–1897	Tottenham Hotspur	21	(1)
1897	Sheffield United		
- * Club domestic league appearances and goals

Lycurgus Burrows (26 June 1875 – 23 August 1952) was an English semi-professional footballer who played for Woolwich Arsenal, Tottenham Hotspur and Sheffield United.

== Career ==
Burrows was born in Ashton-under-Lyne in Greater Manchester on 26 June 1875. With his family moving around a lot, he first started playing football in Melrose in Scotland. The family then moved down to London where Burrows was playing football for Woolwich Polytechnic when he was spotted by Woolwich Arsenal.

Burrows' football league debut for Arsenal was on 6 February 1894 in a match against Rotherham Town. He played ten league games with Arsenal but in the time also played for Tottenham. Burrows' final recorded league game for Arsenal was a 4–3 win against Notts County in November 1895.

For Tottenham, Burrows went on to record a total of 119 appearances and three goals. In 1897 he moved to Sheffield United. According to Football League Players' Records 1888 to 1939 Burrows only had a trial at Sheffield United.

He died in Gosforth on 23 August 1952.
