= Steve Cawley =

English footballer

Personal information
- Full name: Steve Cawley
- Date of birth: 24 July 1991 (age 35)
- Place of birth: Biggleswade, England
- Positions: Forward; striker

Senior career*
Years	Team	Apps	(Gls)
2010–2012	Chesham United	42	(29)
2012–2013	Bishop's Stortford	39	(16)
2013–2018	Concord Rangers	204	(105)
2018–2020	Hemel Hempstead Town	34	(16)
2019–2020	→ Hitchin Town (loan)	15	(10)
2020–2023	Hitchin Town	62	(34)
- * Club domestic league appearances and goals

Steve Cawley is an English semi-professional footballer.

Cawley is best known for being captain and Concord Rangers talisman from 2014 to 2018.
