= Charles Ambler (footballer) =

English footballer

Personal information
- Full name: Charles James Ambler
- Birth name: Charles James Toby
- Date of birth: 13 August 1868
- Place of birth: Alverstoke, Hampshire, England
- Date of death: 5 September 1952 (aged 84)
- Place of death: Woolwich, London, England
- Height: 5 ft 10 in (1.78 m)
- Position: Goalkeeper

Senior career*
| Years | Team | Apps | (Gls) |
- Bostall Rovers
| 1891–1894 | Royal/Woolwich Arsenal | 0 | (0) |
| 1892–1893 | → Clapton (loan) | | |
| 1893–1894 | → Dartford (loan) | | |
| 1894 | → Luton Town (loan) | 0 | (0) |
| 1894–1895 | Tottenham Hotspur | 0 | (0) |
| 1895–1896 | Woolwich Arsenal | 1 | (0) |
| 1896–1900 | Tottenham Hotspur | 22 | (0) |
| 1900 | Gravesend United | | |
| 1900–1901 | New Brompton | | |
| 1901–1902 | West Ham United | 1 | (0) |
| 1902–1903 | Millwall | 9 | (0) |
- * Club domestic league appearances and goals

Charles James Ambler (born Charles James Toby; 13 August 1868 – 5 September 1952) was an English footballer who played as a goalkeeper. He made a single appearance in the Football League for Royal Arsenal and had two spells at Tottenham Hotspur, making 20 Southern League appearances in his second spell. He also played, mainly as a reserve team player, for West Ham United, where he made two first team appearances, and later with Millwall.

== Life and career ==
Born in Alverstoke, Hampshire, Ambler began his career at Bostall Rovers before signing as a professional with Royal Arsenal (soon after renamed Woolwich Arsenal) in 1891. He returned to the amateur ranks the following season, which, while nominally being registered as an Arsenal player, enabled him to play for a variety of clubs with no fixed tenure at any of them. In the period of 1891 to 1894, as well as playing in friendlies for Arsenal, he also played for Clapton, Dartford and Luton Town.

In October 1894, he was formally transferred to Tottenham Hotspur and made his debut in an FA Cup second qualifying round match against Wolverton on 3 November 1894. Spurs, at that point, were not competing in an organised league, which meant that Ambler could also play elsewhere. In October 1894, Ambler signed Southern League forms with Luton Town, but did not register an appearance before he then signed Football League forms with Woolwich Arsenal the following month. There, he made one Second Division appearance, against Newton Heath on 30 November 1895. Ambler had been selected due to the suspension of first-choice 'keeper Harry Storer. Arsenal lost the match 5–1. With no other league appearances to his name, he left Arsenal in the summer of 1896 and returned to Tottenham Hotspur.

Ambler was registered with Spurs from 1896 until 1900. His second spell saw Ambler make 22 Southern League appearances for the club, missing just one match of the 1896–97 season. In total, in both his spells at Tottenham, he made 132 first team appearances. (Note: In addition to Ambler's 34 appearances for Tottenham in the Southern League and FA Cup, he is credited with making 98 "other" appearances in Goodwin, 2017. Only 35 of these are broken down by competition in Goodwin, 2007.) He had spells at Gravesend and New Brompton before, in 1901, he joined east London club West Ham United. Used as a reserve, he played just two first team games for the club in November 1901. The first came as a result of a clash of fixtures, with the Irons due to play a Southern League game against Spurs on the same day as hosting Leyton in the FA Cup. The club chose to field its regulars for the league game and concede home advantage for the cup; the first team lost 1–0 while the second side, with Ambler in goal, won by the same scoreline. Thus, Ambler got his chance in the following Southern League game, against Queens Park Rangers, but with the game ending in a 2–1 defeat, this was to be his only appearance in the league.

He went on to play for Millwall after leaving the Irons in the summer of 1902 and made two Southern League appearances that season. In later life, he went back to using his birth name. He died in 1952.

== Career statistics ==
Appearances and goals by club, season and competition
| Club | Season | League | | | FA Cup | | Other | | Total | |
| Club | Season | Division | Apps | Goals | Apps | Goals | Apps | Goals | Apps | Goals |
|---|---|---|---|---|---|---|---|---|---|---|
| Royal Arsenal | 1892–93 | — | — | | 1 | 0 | — | | 1 | 0 |
| Tottenham Hotspur | 1894–95 | — | — | | 4 | 0 | 12 (Note: 7 appearances in FA Amateur Cup, 5 appearances in London Senior Cup) | 0 | 16 | 0 |
| Woolwich Arsenal | 1895–96 | Football League Second Division | 1 | 0 | — | | — | | 1 | 0 |
| Tottenham Hotspur | 1895–96 | — | — | | 5 | 0 | 1 (Note: Appearance in London Charity Cup) | 0 | 6 | 0 |
| Tottenham Hotspur | 1896–97 | Southern League | 20 | 0 | 3 | 0 | 15 (Note: 12 appearances in United League, 3 appearances in Wellingborough Charity Cup) | 0 | 38 | 0 |
| Tottenham Hotspur | 1897–98 | Southern League | 1 | 0 | — | | 1 (Note: Appearance in United League) | 0 | 2 | 0 |
| Tottenham Hotspur | 1898–99 | Southern League | 1 | 0 | — | | 4 (Note: 2 appearances in United League, 2 appearances in Thames & Medway League) | 0 | 5 | 0 |
| Tottenham Hotspur | 1899–1900 | Southern League | 0 | 0 | — | | 2 (Note: Appearances in Southern District Combination) | 0 | 2 | 0 |
| Tottenham Hotspur | Total | | 22 | 0 | 8 | 0 | 23 | 0 | 53 | 0 |
| West Ham United | 1901–02 | Southern League | 1 | 0 | 1 | 0 | — | | 2 | 0 |
| Millwall | 1902–03 | Southern League | 2 | 0 | — | | 7 (Note: 3 appearances in London League, 4 appearances in Western League) | | 9 | 0 |
| Career total | | | 26 | 0 | 14 | 0 | 42 | 0 | 82 | 0 |
