= Stonebridge Road =

Sports venue in Kent, England

Coordinates: 51°26′58″N 0°19′20″E

Stonebridge Road Stadium
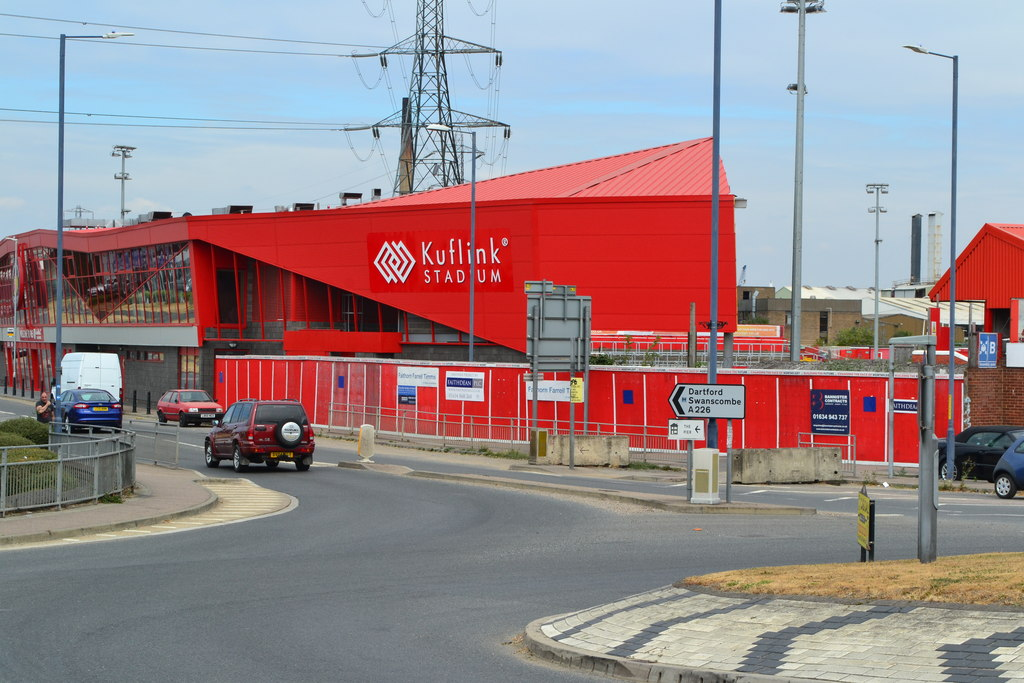
- Stonebridge Road in 2018
- Interactive map of Stonebridge Road Stadium
- Former names: The PHB Stadium; Kuflink Stadium
- Address: Stonebridge Road, Northfleet, DA11 9GN
- Location: Kent, United Kingdom
- Owner: Ebbsfleet United F.C.
- Capacity: 4,769 (2,179 seated)
- Surface: Grass
- Record attendance: 12,032 (vs Sunderland, 16 February 1963)
- Public transit: Northfleet railway station

Construction
- Opened: 2 September 1905
- Renovated: 1953, 2006, 2017, 2018

Tenants
- Northfleet United F.C. (1905–1946); Gravesend & Northfleet / Ebbsfleet United (1946–present); Dartford F.C. (2000–2006)

Website
- ebbsfleetunited.co.uk

Stonebridge Road is a multi-purpose stadium in Northfleet, Gravesend, Kent, England, also known as Morrow Stadium for sponsorship reasons. It is primarily used for football matches. Stonebridge Road was constructed in 1905, and was initially the home of Northfleet United F.C., which merged with Gravesend United in 1946. It is currently the home ground of Ebbsfleet United (formerly Gravesend & Northfleet FC). Thus, Stonebridge Road has been the home of Ebbsfleet and its predecessor football clubs for over 100 years.

Although one of the Fleet's local rivals, from 2000 to 2006 Dartford had a groundsharing agreement with Ebbsfleet United to use Stonebridge Road as its home. Gillingham used Stonebridge Road briefly for home matches in 1961.

== Ground details ==
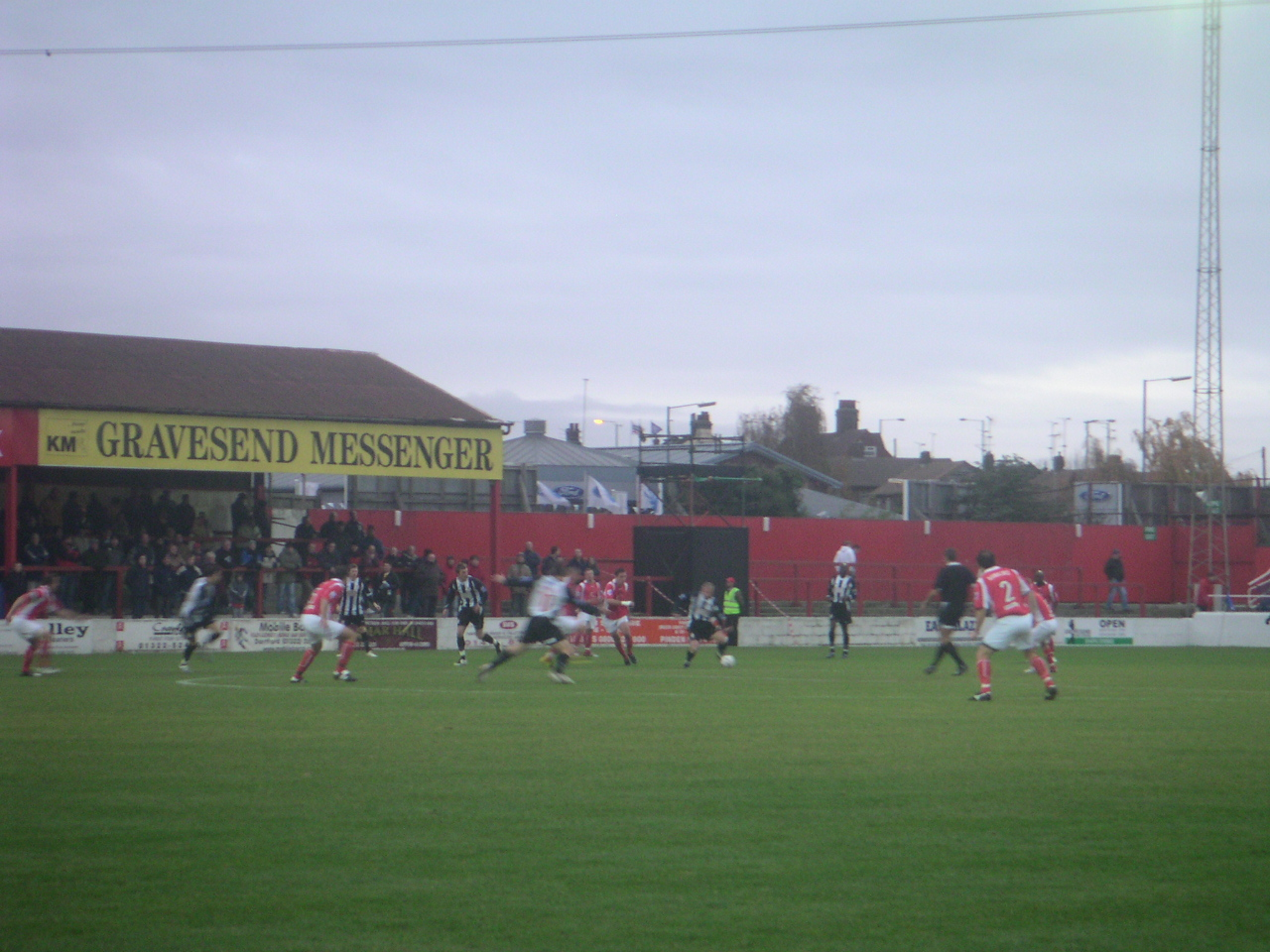
Stonebridge Road, November 2007

The stadium has a capacity of 4,769 people. The average attendance for Ebbsfleet United home ties at Stonebridge Road was 1,165 in the 2006-2007 season.

When the Fleet plays at Stonebridge Road, the home supporters typically sit in the Main Stand or in the Plough End. Both those seating areas are covered, although seats were not installed in the Plough End, which is also called the Northfleet End, until 2006. Home fans also stand in the terraced Stonebridge Road Stand, which runs along the length of the pitch on the side of the stadium closest to the street and which is also covered. Away supporters typically stand in the Swanscombe End, which is an open terrace.

The pitch size at Stonebridge Road is 112 by 72 yards for football matches, and the pitch is presently maintained by groundsman Peter Norton.

The postcode (for maps and directions) of Stonebridge Road is DA11 9GN.

== History ==
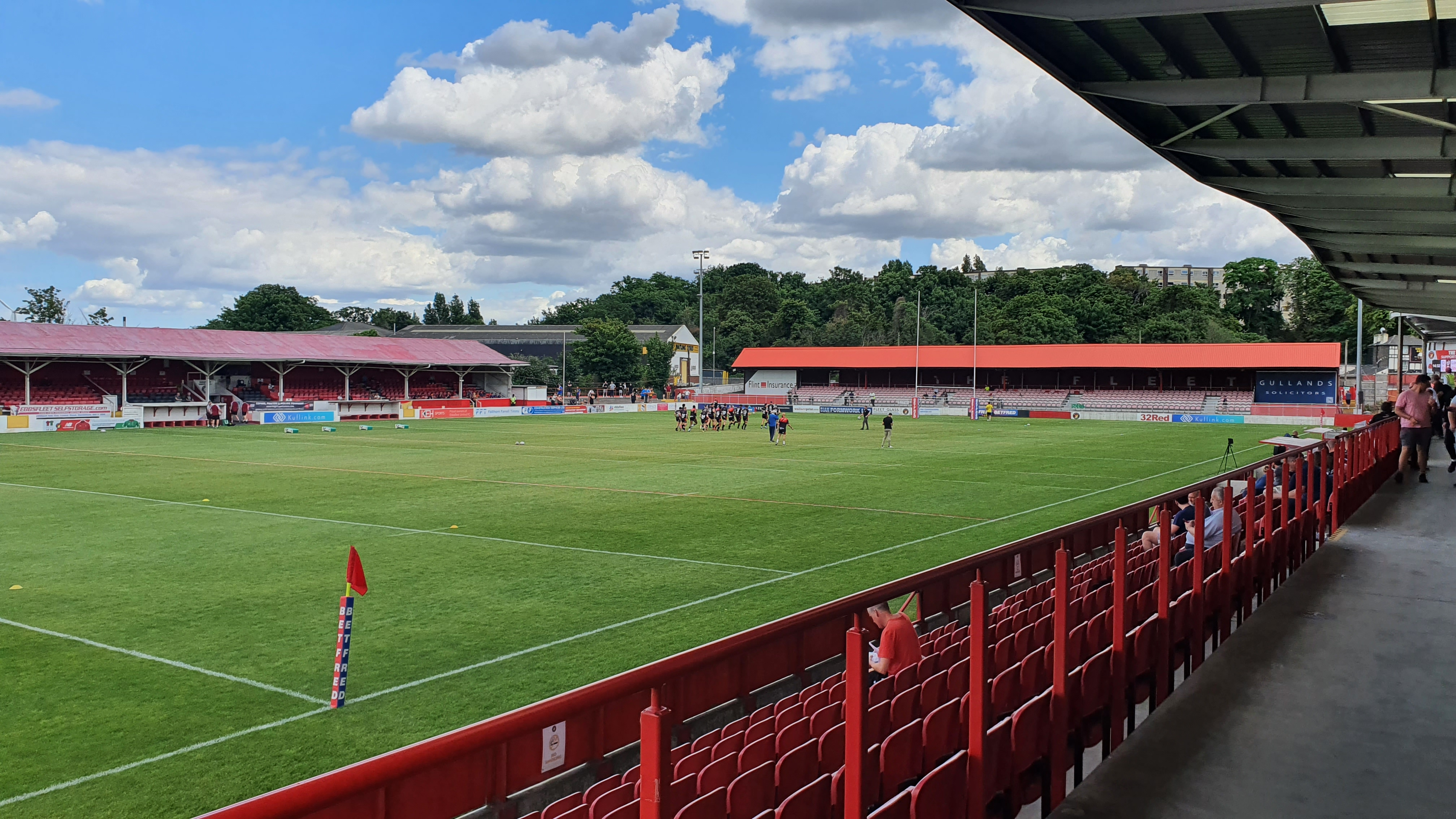
Stonebridge Road in rugby league configuration prior to a London Broncos match in July 2022

Ebbsfleet United, then called Gravesend and Northfleet F.C., played its first ever match after the merger of the two Kent clubs at Stonebridge Road in August 1946 against Hereford United. The Fleet won that first match 3–0 with more than 5,000 fans in attendance. The stadium's record attendance is 12,032, which was achieved against Sunderland in February 1963 in an FA Cup Fourth Round tie.

In April 2002, the Fleet gained promotion to the top level of non-league football, the Conference National, by defeating Bedford Town on the last day of the season at The New Eyrie. The season also saw the highest modern day attendance at Stonebridge Road, an official figure of 4,068 spectators was announced for the game was against title rivals Canvey Island, although unofficial estimates put the number closer to 6,000 fans.

Following the club's victory in the FA Trophy in May 2008, the parade honouring Ebbsfleet United's victorious squad started at Stonebridge Road.

In May 2013, KEH Sports Ltd, a group of Kuwaiti investors completed a take-over of Ebbsfleet United.

In July 2014, the construction company PHB agreed a sponsorship deal with the club to rename the stadium as The PHB Stadium, Stonebridge Road. A new sponsorship deal for stadium naming rights was struck in 2017 and the ground is currently The Kuflink Stadium.

== Future ==
In August 2009 proposals for a new stadium as part of redevelopments in the local areas were rejected by Kent County Council and Gravesham Borough Council. After the owners of the freehold put the site up for auction on 21 September, a group of former directors, Ebbsfleet supporters and MyFootballClub members set up a limited company to raise the funds to buy out the freehold.

On 17 September 2009, Gravesham Borough Council announced that they had bought the ground, to be leased to the club at £1 per year, but with the option of the Club purchasing it from the Council if sufficient funds can be raised.

In 2016, work began on a new multi-million pound redevelopment of the stadium with the demolition of the Liam Daish stand and adjoining terracing. The resulting structure on the Stonebridge Road side will house all of the operational and commercial offices, as well as hospitality and social facilities and seating. The new stand opened for supporters in December 2016 and was fully operational in November 2017.

Because National League requirements state a stadium capacity of 4,000 is in place, the club completed work on a £200,000 strengthening of the Swanscombe End terrace to bring the Kuflink Stadium up to a capacity of 4,769, from its previous 3,134.

In 2022, a development of Northfleet Harbourside was proposed, which included a new 8,000-seat stadium as part of a wider £1.3 billion regeneration of the area. Plans were approved locally in 2024 and would have involved demolition of Stonebridge Road. However, the proposal was called in by the Ministry for Housing, Communities and Local Government in February 2025 and, in August 2026, following a public enquiry, planning permission for the development was refused over fears it might expose residents to "highly toxic lead poisoning".
