= List of West Ham United F.C. players =

== Explanation of List ==
=== League appearances ===
League appearances and goals should include data for the following league spells, but should not include test or play-off matches:

- Southern League: 1898–99 to 1914–15
- Football League: 1919–20 to 1992–93, 2003–04 to 2004–05, 2011–12, 2026–27 to present
- Premier League: 1993–94 to 2002–03, 2005–06 to 2010–11, 2012–13 to 2025–26

=== European appearances ===
European appearances and goals should include data from the following campaigns:

- UEFA Cup Winners' Cup 1964–65, 1965–66, 1975–76, 1980–81
- UEFA Intertoto Cup 1999
- UEFA Cup/Europa League 1999–2000, 2006–07, 2015–16, 2016–17, 2021–22, 2023–24
- UEFA Conference League 2022–23

=== Other appearances ===
The figures for other appearances should include the following competitions:

- Southern League test matches 1898–99 and 1899–1900
- Southern Professional Floodlit Cup 1955–56 to 1959–60
- Charity Shield 1964, 1975, 1980
- Watney Cup 1973–74
- Texaco Cup 1974–75
- Anglo-Italian League Cup 1975–76
- Full Members Cup 1986–87 to 1991–92
- Anglo-Italian Cup 1992–93
- Football League play-offs 2004, 2005, 2012

== List of players ==
- Minimum of 100 club appearances to be included
- Bold indicates player is still with West Ham United
- Correct as of match played 7 November 2026, vs Blackburn Rovers

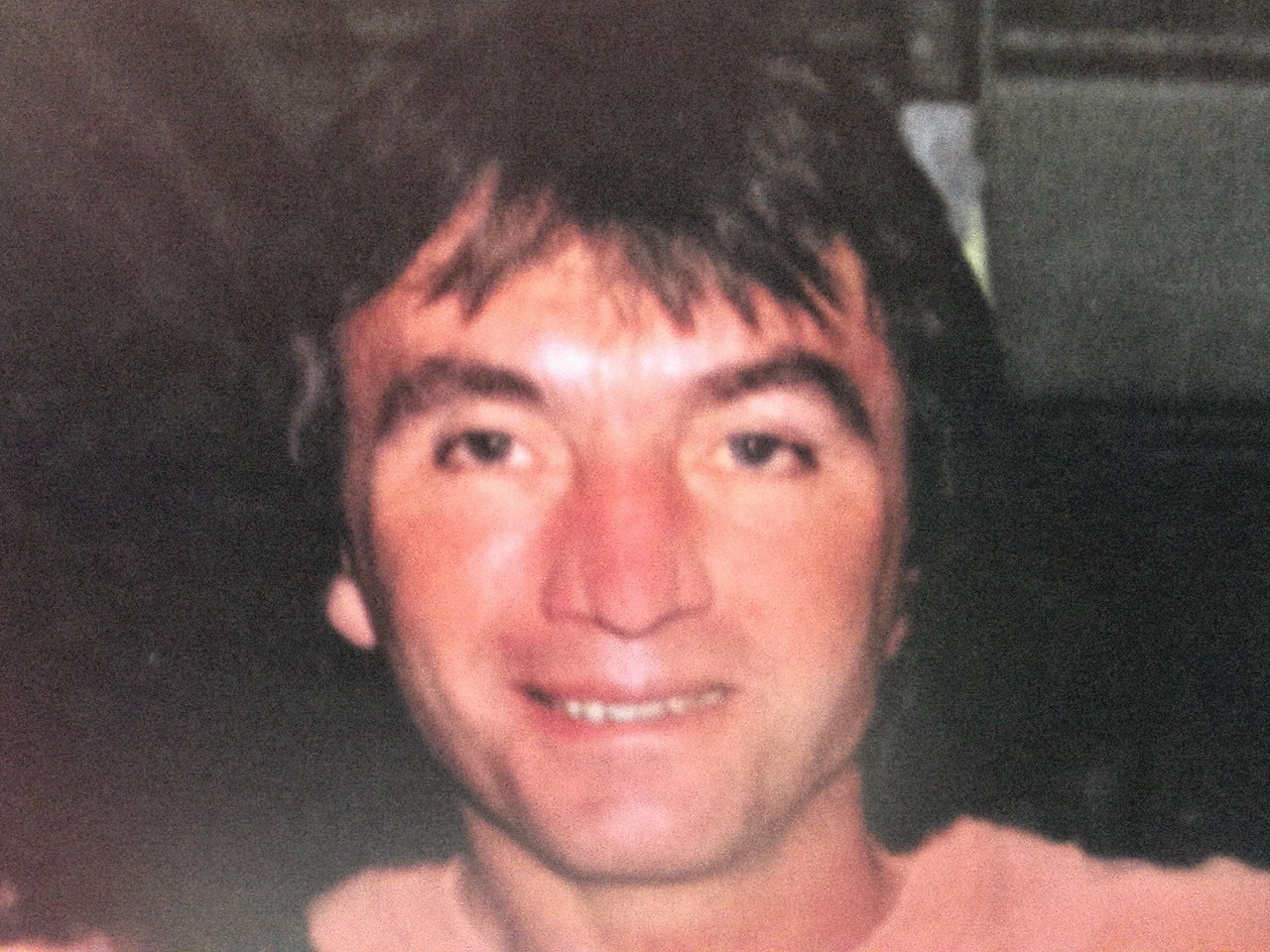
Billy Bonds, record club appearances (799)

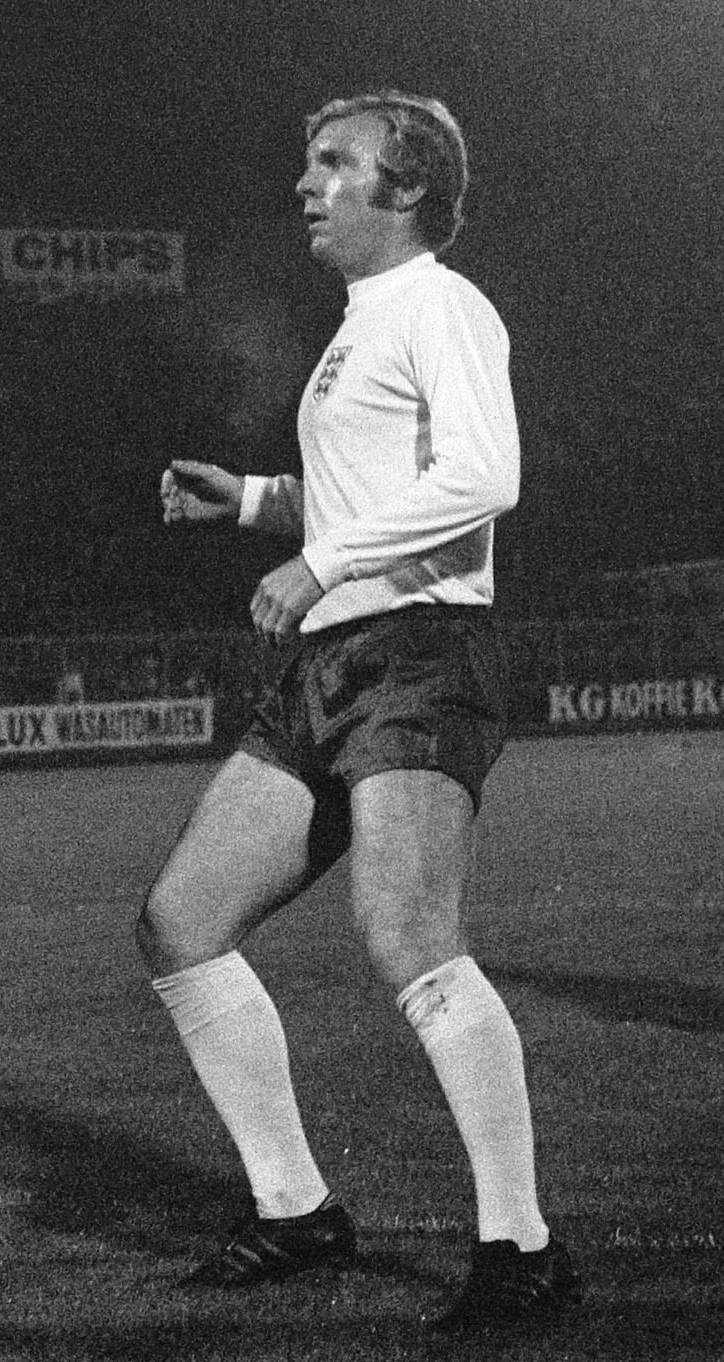
Bobby Moore, FIFA World Cup winning captain in 1966 with England

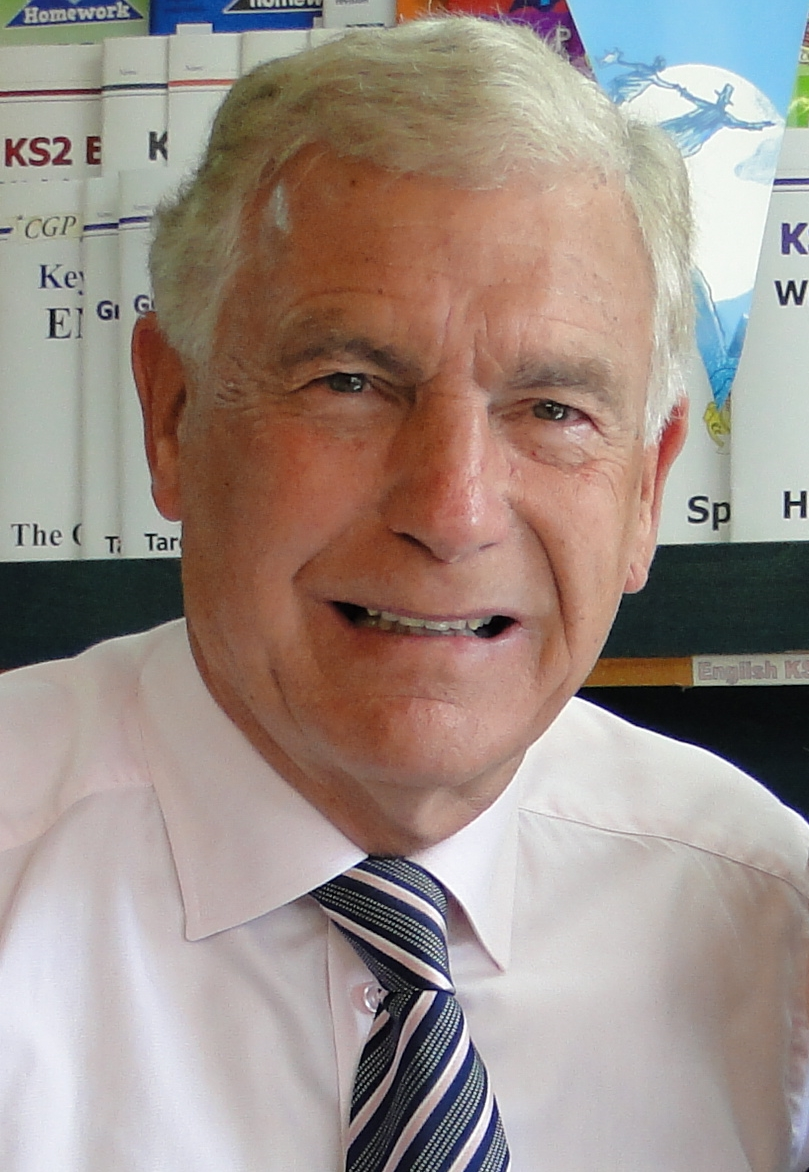
Sir Trevor Brooking, voted Hammer of the Year a record five occasions

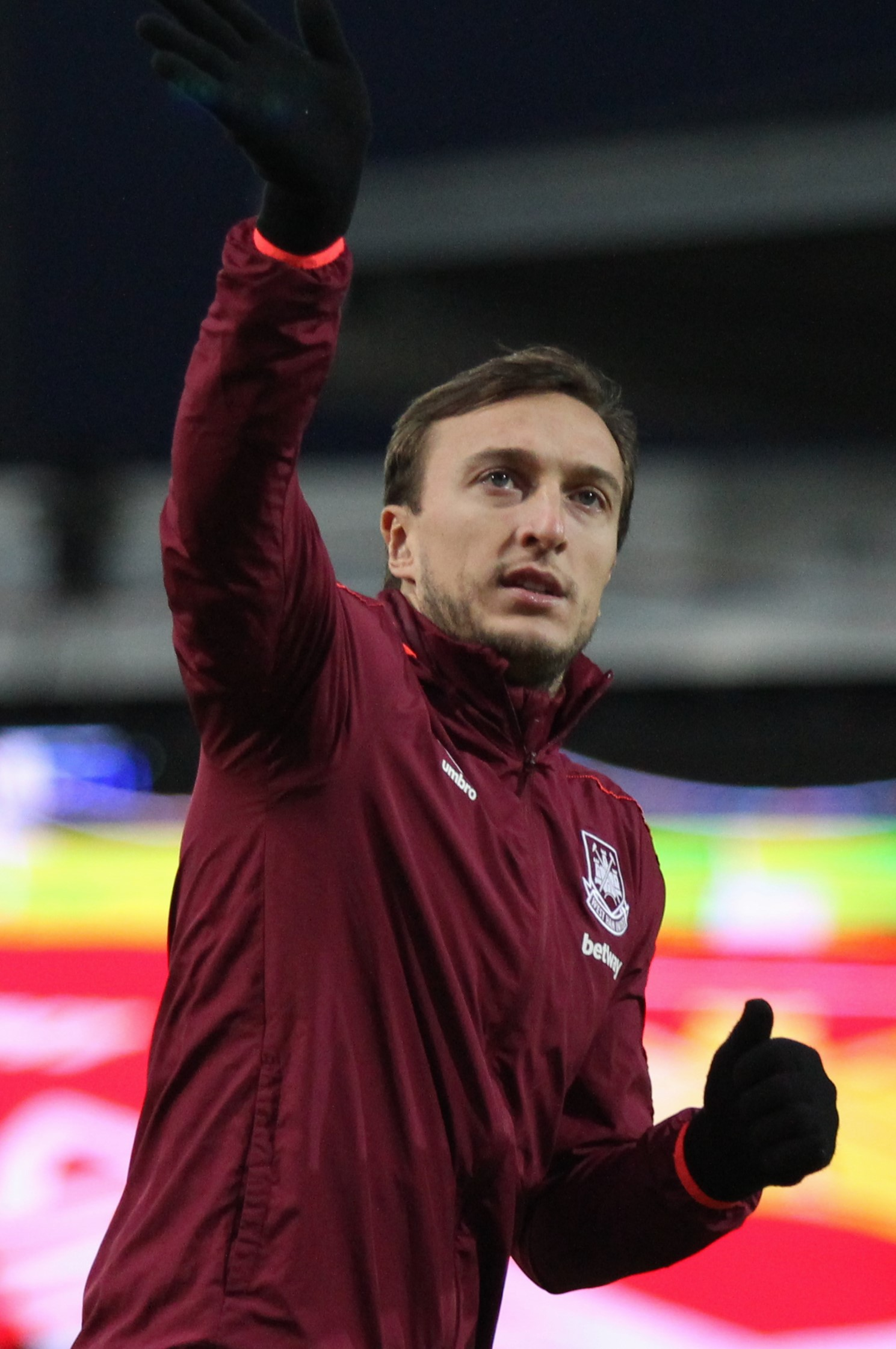
Mark Noble, record Premier League appearances (414)

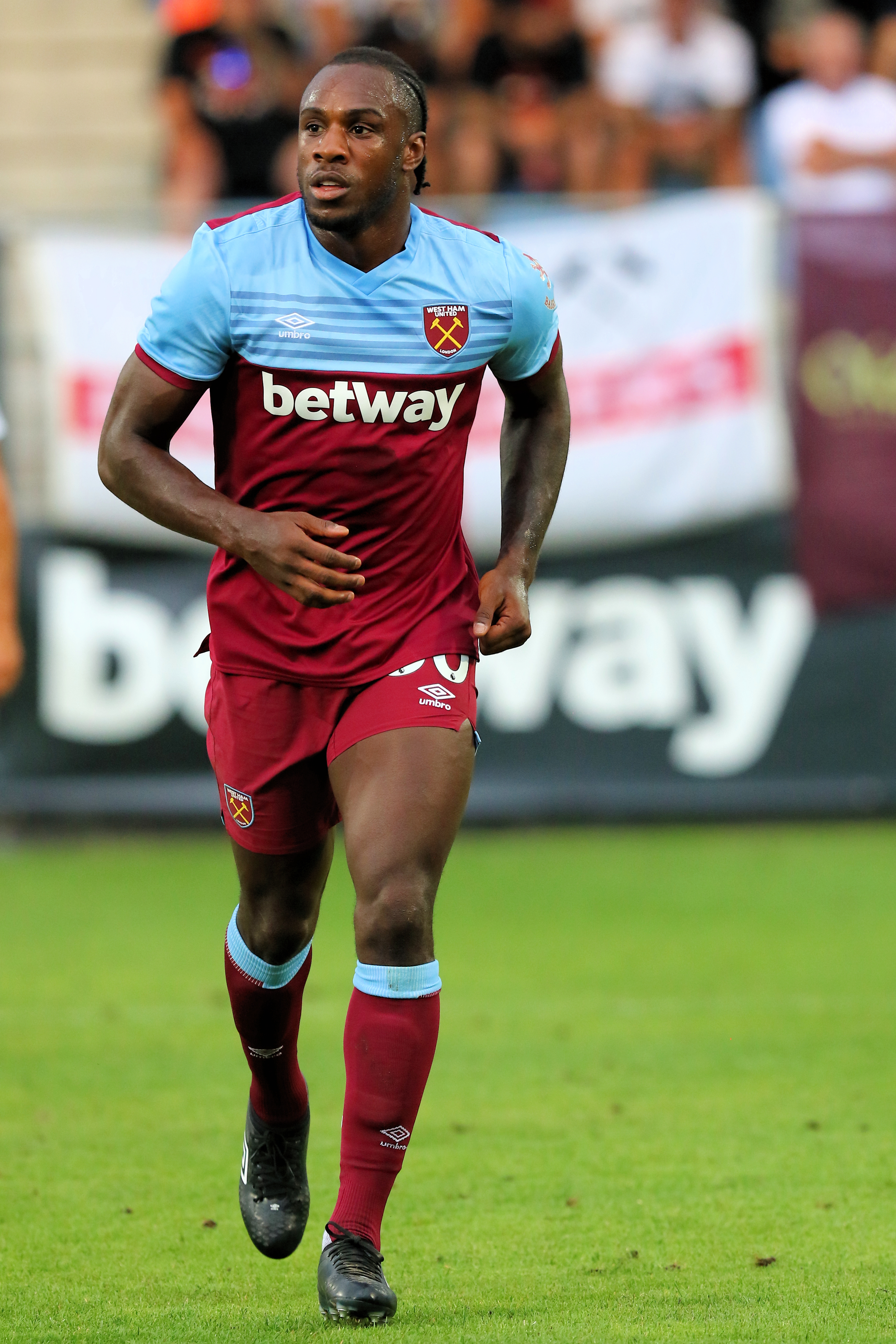
Michail Antonio, record Premier League goalscorer (68)

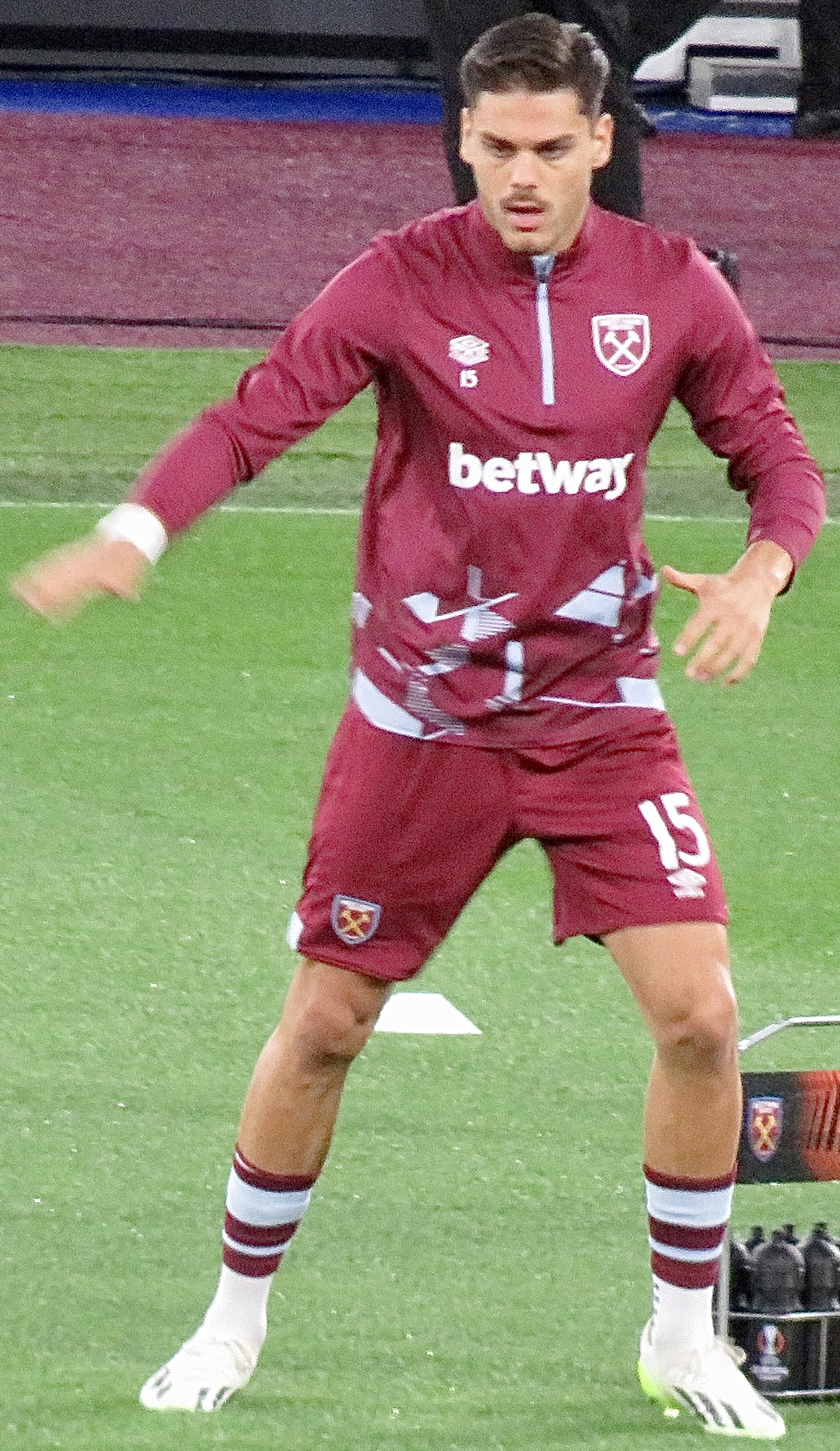
Konstantinos Mavropanos, current Hammer of the Year

#	Player	West Ham Career	Signed from	League Apps	FA Cup Apps	EFL Cup Apps	Euro Apps	Other Apps	Total Apps	Total Goals	Notes
1	(England) Billy Bonds	1967–1988	Charlton Athletic	663	48	67	15	6	799	61	Hammer of the Year: 1971, 1974, 1975, 1987
2	(England) Frank Lampard, Sr.	1967–1985	Academy	551	43	54	15	7	670	22	
3	(England) Bobby Moore	1958–1974	Academy	544	36	49	13	5	647	27	Hammer of the Year: 1961, 1963, 1968, 1970; Football Writers' Player of the Year: 1964
4	(England) Trevor Brooking	1967–1984	Academy	528	40	55	11	9	643	102	Hammer of the Year: 1972, 1976, 1977, 1978, 1984
5	(England) Alvin Martin	1977–1996	Academy	469	40	71	6	10	596	34	Hammer of the Year: 1980, 1982, 1983
6	(England) Mark Noble	2004–2022	Academy	472	32	25	15	6	550	62	Hammer of the Year: 2012, 2014
7	(England) Jimmy Ruffell	1921–1937	Academy	505	43	0	0	0	548	166	
8	(England) Steve Potts	1985–2002	Academy	399	42	42	8	15	506	1	Hammer of the Year: 1993, 1995
9	(England) Vic Watson	1920–1935	Wellingborough Town	462	43	0	0	0	505	326	
10	(England) Geoff Hurst	1959–1972	Academy	411	26	47	15	5	504	252	Hammer of the Year: 1966, 1967, 1969
11	(England) Ken Brown	1952–1967	Academy	386	26	28	15	13	468	4	Hammer of the Year: 1959
12	(England) Jim Barrett	1924–1945	Academy	442	25	0	0	0	467	53	
13	(England) Alan Devonshire	1976–1990	Southall	358	36	48	4	1	447	32	Hammer of the Year: 1979
14	(England) John Bond	1951–1965	Academy	381	30	13	4	16	444	37	
15	(England) Phil Parkes	1978–1990	Queens Park Rangers	344	34	52	6	4	440	0	Hammer of the Year: 1981
16	(Scotland) Ray Stewart	1979–1991	(Scotland) Dundee United	345	36	44	6	1	432	84	
17	(England) Ernie Gregory	1939–1960	Leytonstone	382	24	0	0	9	415	0	
18	(England) Tommy Taylor	1970–1979	Leyton Orient	340	21	26	9	7	403	8	
19	(England) Ted Hufton	1915–1932	Sheffield United	371	31	0	0	0	402	0	
20	(Czech Republic) Luděk Mikloško	1990–1998	(Czech Republic) Baník Ostrava	315	25	25	0	5	370	0	Hammer of the Year: 1991
21	(England) Aaron Cresswell	2014–2025	Ipswich Town	312	19	12	26	0	369	11	Hammer of the Year: 2015
22	(England) Tony Gale	1984–1994	Fulham	300	29	30	0	9	368	7	
22	(England) Geoff Pike	1975–1987	Academy	291	31	39	6	1	368	41	
24	(Scotland) John Dick	1953–1963	Crittall Athletic	326	21	4	0	13	364	176	
24	(England) Martin Peters	1962–1970	Academy	302	16	31	15	0	364	100	Hammer of the Year: 1965
26	(England) Tommy Yews	1923–1933	Hartlepool United	332	29	0	0	0	361	51	
27	(England) Ronnie Boyce	1960–1972	Academy	282	21	23	13	2	341	29	
28	(England) Jimmy Collins	1924–1936	Leyton	311	25	0	0	0	336	3	
28	(England) Tony Cottee	1983-1988; 1994-1996	Academy; Everton	279	29	27	0	1	336	146	Hammer of the Year: 1986; PFA Young Player of the Year: 1986
30	(England) Julian Dicks	1988-1993; 1994-1999	Birmingham City; Liverpool	262	23	30	0	11	326	65	Hammer of the Year: 1990, 1992, 1996, 1997
31	(Jamaica) Michail Antonio	2015–2025	Nottingham Forest	268	16	9	30	0	323	83	Hammer of the Year: 2017
32	(England) Andy Malcolm	1953–1962	Academy	283	21	2	0	13	319	4	Hammer of the Year: 1958
33	(England) Malcolm Musgrove	1953–1963	Academy	282	13	5	0	14	314	100	Hammer of the Year: 1960
33	(England) Dick Walker	1934–1953	Academy	295	19	0	0	0	314	2	
35	(England) Ian Bishop	1989–1998	Manchester City	254	23	22	0	5	304	17	
35	(England) Pat Holland	1969–1981	Academy	245	16	25	10	8	304	32	
37	(England) John McDowell	1970–1979	Academy	249	19	21	7	7	303	9	
38	(England) **Jarrod Bowen**	**2020–present**	**Hull City**	**246**	**12**	**12**	**28**	**0**	**298**	**94**	**Hammer of the Year: 2024**
38	(England) George Parris	1984–1993	Academy	239	21	30	0	8	298	18	
40	(England) Albert Cadwell	1923–1933	Academy	272	25	0	0	0	297	1	
41	(England) Tim Breacker	1990–1999	Luton Town	240	28	21	0	7	296	8	
42	(England) Carlton Cole	2006–2015	Chelsea	256	15	17	2	3	293	68	
43	(Czech Republic) **Tomáš Souček**	**2020–present**	**(Czech Republic) Slavia Prague**	**236**	**15**	**8**	**32**	**0**	**291**	**50**	**Hammer of the Year: 2021**
44	(England) Kevin Keen	1986–1993	Wycombe Wanderers	219	21	22	0	16	278	30	
45	(Republic of Ireland) Noel Cantwell	1952–1960	(Republic of Ireland) Cork Athletic	248	15	0	0	12	277	11	
45	(Scotland) Bobby Ferguson	1967–1980	(Scotland) Kilmarnock	240	17	19	0	1	277	0	
47	(England) Jackie Morton	1931–1939	Academy	258	17	0	0	0	275	57	
47	(England) Terry Woodgate	1938–1953	Academy	259	16	0	0	0	275	52	
49	(England) Stan Earle	1924–1932	Clapton	258	15	0	0	0	273	58	
50	(England) Joe Cockroft	1932–1941	Gainsborough Trinity	254	12	0	0	0	266	3	
50	(England) John Sissons	1962–1970	Academy	213	18	21	13	1	266	53	
52	(England) George Kay	1916–1926	(Northern Ireland) Distillery	237	22	0	0	0	259	17	
53	(England) Malcolm Allison	1951–1957	Charlton Athletic	238	17	0	0	3	258	10	
54	(England) Len Goulden	1933–1945	Leyton	242	14	0	0	0	256	53	
55	(England) Bryan 'Pop' Robson	1970-1974; 1976-1979	Newcastle United; Sunderland	227	12	15	0	1	255	104	Hammer of the Year: 1973
56	(England) Herbert Ashton	1908–1915	Accrington	224	25	0	0	0	249	27	
56	(Italy) Angelo Ogbonna	2015–2024	(Italy) Juventus	201	19	13	16	0	249	13	
58	(England) Declan Rice	2017–2023	Academy	204	11	9	21	0	245	15	Hammer of the Year: 2020, 2022, 2023
59	(England) James Tomkins	2008–2016	Academy	208	14	14	4	3	243	11	
60	(England) Robert Green	2006–2012	Norwich City	219	11	8	0	3	241	0	Hammer of the Year: 2008
61	(England) Fred Blackburn	1905–1913	Blackburn Rovers	218	20	0	0	0	238	28	
62	(England) Mervyn Day	1973–1979	Academy	194	14	14	9	6	237	0	PFA Young Player of the Year: 1975
63	(England) Jim Standen	1962–1968	Luton Town	178	20	23	14	1	236	0	
64	(England) Alan Dickens	1982–1989	Academy	192	22	17	0	3	234	30	
65	(England) Martin Allen	1989–1996	Queens Park Rangers	190	14	18	0	10	232	35	
66	(England) Frank Piercy	1904–1912	Middlesbrough	214	17	0	0	0	231	7	
67	(Northern Ireland) Steve Lomas	1997–2005	Manchester City	187	13	14	10	3	227	13	
68	(Argentina) Manuel Lanzini	2015–2023	(United Arab Emirates) Al Jazira	179	13	12	22	0	226	32	
69	(England) David Cross	1977–1982	West Bromwich Albion	179	14	24	6	1	224	97	
70	(New Zealand) Winston Reid	2010–2021	(Denmark) Midtjylland	194	14	7	4	3	222	10	Hammer of the Year: 2013
71	(Bermuda) Clyde Best	1969–1976	Academy	186	12	20	0	3	221	58	
72	(England) Danny Shea	1908-1913; 1920-1921	Academy; Blackburn Rovers	195	22	0	0	0	217	122	
73	(Poland) Łukasz Fabiański	2018–2026	(Wales) Swansea City	195	7	4	10	0	216	0	Hammer of the Year: 2019
74	(England) Peter Brabrook	1962–1968	Chelsea	167	17	23	7	1	215	43	
75	(Wales) James Collins	2005-2009; 2012-2018	(Wales) Cardiff City; Aston Villa	188	12	9	5	0	214	9	
75	(England) Trevor Morley	1989–1995	Manchester City	178	19	11	0	6	214	70	Hammer of the Year: 1994
77	(England) Paul Goddard	1980–1987	Queens Park Rangers	170	11	26	6	0	213	71	
77	(England) Hayden Mullins	2003–2009	Crystal Palace	180	17	10	0	6	213	7	
79	(Republic of Ireland) Frank O'Farrell	1950–1957	(Republic of Ireland) Cork United	197	13	0	0	1	211	8	
80	(England) Derek Parker	1944–1957	Grays Athletic	199	8	0	0	2	209	9	
80	(England) Mark Ward	1985–1990	Oldham Athletic	165	17	21	0	6	209	14	
82	(England) Johnny Byrne	1961–1967	Crystal Palace	156	18	19	12	1	206	108	Hammer of the Year: 1964
82	(England) Alfred Earl	1925–1933	Academy	191	15	0	0	0	206	0	
82	(England) Trevor Sinclair	1998–2003	Queens Park Rangers	177	8	11	10	0	206	38	
85	(England) George Kitchen	1905–1911	Everton	184	21	0	0	0	205	6	
85	(England) Tommy Randall	1907–1914	Academy	189	16	0	0	0	205	10	
87	(Spain) Pablo Fornals	2019–2024	(Spain) Villarreal	152	12	8	31	0	203	23	
87	(England) John Moncur	1994–2003	Swindon Town	175	8	14	6	0	203	9	
89	(England) Alf Chalkley	1931–1944	Academy	188	14	0	0	0	202	1	
89	(England) Billy Moore	1922–1929	Sunderland	181	21	0	0	0	202	48	
91	(England) Paul Allen	1979–1985	Academy	152	18	24	2	1	197	11	Hammer of the Year: 1985
92	(England) Matthew Etherington	2003–2009	Tottenham Hotspur	165	15	8	1	6	195	18	Hammer of the Year: 2004
93	(England) Syd Puddefoot	1912-1921; 1931-1933	Academy; Blackburn Rovers	180	14	0	0	0	194	107	
94	(Scotland) Christian Dailly	2001–2007	Blackburn Rovers	158	20	8	0	5	191	4	
95	(England) Joe Kirkup	1958–1966	Academy	165	8	7	7	3	190	6	
95	(Scotland) Frank McAvennie	1985-1987; 1989-1992	(Scotland) St Mirren (Scotland) Celtic	153	20	13	0	4	190	60	
97	(Czech Republic) Tomáš Řepka	2001–2006	(Italy) Fiorentina	122	10	8	0	6	188	0	
98	(England) Joe Cole	1999-2003; 2013-2014	Academy; Liverpool	157	12	13	5	0	187	18	Hammer of the Year: 2003
98	(England) Frank Lampard, Jr.	1996–2001	Academy	148	13	16	10	0	187	38	
100	(England) Paul Brush	1977–1985	Academy	151	17	13	4	1	186	1	
101	(England) Jack Burkett	1962–1967	Academy	142	18	17	7	1	185	4	
102	(England) Eddie Bovington	1960–1967	Academy	138	19	18	8	1	184	2	
103	(England) Billy Henderson	1921–1928	(Wales) Aberdare Athletic	162	21	0	0	0	183	1	
104	(Czech Republic) Vladimír Coufal	2020–2025	(Czech Republic) Slavia Prague	147	5	7	21	0	180	0	
105	(England) Ted Fenton	1932–1946	Academy	166	13	0	0	0	179	19	
105	(Scotland) Billy Grassam	1900-1903; 1905-1909	Port Vale; Leyton	169	10	0	0	0	179	68	
105	(England) Stuart Slater	1987–1992	Academy	141	16	17	0	5	179	18	
108	(England) Steve Forde	1937–1951	Rotherham United	170	6	0	0	0	176	1	
109	(Scotland) Neil Orr	1982–1987	(Scotland) Greenock Morton	146	11	18	0	0	175	5	
109	(England) Harry Redknapp	1965–1972	Academy	149	8	18	0	0	175	8	
111	(Scotland) Norman Corbett	1936–1950	(Scotland) Heart of Midlothian	166	8	0	0	0	174	3	
111	(England) Albert Walker	1932–1938	Barrow	162	12	0	0	0	174	0	
113	(England) Sid Bishop	1920–1927	Ilford	159	13	0	0	0	172	10	
113	(England) George Wright	1951–1958	Margate	161	9	0	0	2	172	0	
115	(England) Marlon Harewood	2003–2007	Nottingham Forest	142	14	6	2	6	170	56	
116	(England) Jack Tresadern	1913–1925	Barking Town	144	16	0	0	6	166	6	
117	(Scotland) Tommy Allison	1903–1909	Reading	156	9	0	0	0	165	7	
117	(England) Kevin Lock	1971–1978	Academy	132	12	13	4	4	165	2	
119	(England) Anton Ferdinand	2003–2008	Academy	138	14	7	1	3	163	5	
119	(England) Ian Pearce	1997–2004	Blackburn Rovers	142	11	8	2	0	163	10	
121	(England) Mike Grice	1956–1961	Colchester United	142	7	1	0	12	162	22	
122	(England) Michael Carrick	1999–2004	Academy	136	11	8	1	3	159	6	
123	(England) Rio Ferdinand	1996–2000	Academy	127	9	13	9	0	158	2	Hammer of the Year: 1998
124	(Trinidad and Tobago) Shaka Hislop	1998-2002; 2005-2006	Newcastle United; Portsmouth	121	14	13	9	0	157	0	Hammer of the Year: 1999
124	(England) Kevin Nolan	2011–2015	Newcastle United	141	6	4	3	3	157	31	
126	(Algeria) Saïd Benrahma	2020–2024	Brentford	110	9	6	30	0	155	24	
126	(England) George Carter	1919–1927	Academy	136	19	0	0	0	155	1	
128	(England) Charlie Bicknell	1936–1947	Bradford City	140	12	0	0	0	152	1	
128	(Northern Ireland) George McCartney	2006-2008; 2011-2014	Sunderland; Sunderland	133	5	11	0	3	152	2	
128	(England) Graham Paddon	1973–1976	Norwich City	115	11	11	9	6	152	15	
128	(England) Bobby Zamora	2004–2008	Tottenham Hotspur	130	9	5	2	6	152	40	
132	(England) Billy Cope	1914–1922	Oldham Athletic	141	10	0	0	0	151	0	
132	(Republic of Ireland) Tommy Moroney	1947–1953	(Republic of Ireland) Cork United	148	3	0	0	0	151	8	
132	(England) Eric Parsons	1947–1950	Academy	145	6	0	0	0	151	35	
135	(Spain) Adrián	2013–2019	(Spain) Real Betis	125	8	13	4	0	150	0	
135	(Wales) Phil Woosnam	1958–1962	Leyton Orient	138	5	4	0	3	150	31	
137	(Senegal) Cheikhou Kouyaté	2014–2018	(Belgium) Anderlecht	129	7	6	5	0	147	15	
137	(England) Steve Walford	1983–1987	Norwich City	115	14	17	0	1	147	4	
139	(England) Matthew Upson	2007–2011	Birmingham City	131	6	8	0	0	145	4	
140	(England) Andy Carroll	2012–2019	Liverpool	126	9	4	3	0	142	34	
140	(England) John Charles	1962–1970	Academy	118	1	20	4	0	142	2	
140	(England) Nigel Reo-Coker	2003–2007	Wimbledon	120	10	4	2	6	142	11	
143	(Italy) Paolo Di Canio	1999–2003	Sheffield Wednesday	118	5	8	10	0	141	51	Hammer of the Year: 2000
144	(England) Len Jarvis	1904–1909	Academy	133	7	0	0	0	140	5	
145	(Brazil) Lucas Paquetá	2022–2026	(France) Olympique Lyonnais	110	4	5	20	0	139	23	
145	(England) Dan Woodards	1905–1921	Academy	125	14	0	0	0	139	3	
147	(England) Viv Gibbins	1923–1931	Academy	129	9	0	0	0	138	63	
147	(England) Jack Young	1919–1925	Southend United	124	14	0	0	0	138	3	
149	(England) John Smith	1956–1960	Academy	125	5	0	0	6	136	23	
150	(England) Harry Hooper	1951–1956	Academy	119	11	0	0	1	131	44	
151	(England) Scott Parker	2007–2011	Newcastle United	113	6	10	0	0	129	12	Hammer of the Year: 2009, 2010, 2011; Football Writers' Player of the Year: 2011
152	(Democratic Republic of the Congo) Arthur Masuaku	2016–2023	(Greece) Olympiacos	105	7	12	4	0	128	2	
152	(England) Alan Sealey	1961–1967	Leyton Orient	107	8	6	7	0	128	26	
154	(England) Herman Conway	1934–1940	Burnley	122	5	0	0	0	127	0	
155	(England) Gerry Gazzard	1949–1953	Gravesend United	119	7	0	0	0	126	32	
156	(England) Frank Burton	1912–1921	Queens Park Rangers	114	11	0	0	0	125	6	
156	(England) Billy Dare	1954–1959	Brentford	111	8	0	0	6	125	52	
156	(England) Billy Jennings	1974–1979	Watford	99	11	5	7	3	125	39	
159	(France) **Alphonse Areola**	**2021–present**	(France) **Paris Saint-Germain**	**83**	**8**	**6**	**27**	**0**	**124**	**0**	
159	(England) Alan Taylor	1974–1979	Rochdale	98	8	8	7	3	124	36	
161	(England) Keith Coleman	1973–1977	Sunderland	101	3	6	7	5	122	0	
162	(Scotland) Jimmy Andrews	1951–1956	(Scotland) Dundee	114	6	0	0	1	121	22	
162	(Morocco) Issa Diop	2018–2022	(France) Toulouse	96	9	8	8	0	121	8	
162	(France) Julien Faubert	2007–2012	(France) Bordeaux	103	5	11	0	2	121	2	
162	(Scotland) Roddy McEachrane	1898–1902	(Scotland) Inverness Thistle	104	17	0	0	0	121	9	Includes 62 appearances for Thames Ironworks F.C.
162	(England) Charlie Walker	1936–1946	Arsenal	113	8	0	0	0	121	0	
167	(Republic of Ireland) Liam Brady	1986–1990	(Italy) Ascoli	89	9	17	0	4	119	10	
168	(Greece) **Konstantinos Mavropanos**	**2023–present**	(Germany) **VfB Stuttgart**	**96**	**6**	**7**	**9**	**0**	**118**	**9**	**Hammer of the Year: 2026**
168	(England) Sam Small	1937–1948	Birmingham City	108	10	0	0	0	118	40	
168	(England) Alan Stephenson	1967–1972	Crystal Palace	108	4	6	0	0	118	1	
171	(Wales) Jack Collison	2008–2014	Academy	100	7	4	0	3	117	14	
172	(England) Jack Hebden	1921–1927	Bradford City	110	6	0	0	0	116	0	
172	(Equatorial Guinea) Pedro Obiang	2015–2019	(Italy) Sampdoria	91	11	10	4	0	116	3	
174	(Wales) Danny Gabbidon	2005–2011	(Wales) Cardiff City	98	9	6	2	0	115	0	Hammer of the Year: 2006
174	(United States) Jonathan Spector	2006–2011	Manchester United	101	6	7	1	0	115	4	
174	(England) George Taylor	1938-1956	Gainsborough Trinity	115	0	0	0	0	115	0	
177	(England) Stan Foxall	1934–1945	Gainsborough Trinity	106	7	0	0	0	114	42	
178	(Italy) Emerson Palmieri	2022–2025	Chelsea	89	5	3	16	0	113	5	
179	(England) William Askew	1912–1916	Norwich City	104	8	0	0	0	112	2	
180	(England) Jack Yeomanson	1947–1951	Margate	106	5	0	0	0	111	1	
181	(England) Colin Foster	1989–1994	Nottingham Forest	93	9	5	0	3	110	6	
181	(Scotland) Don Hutchison	1994-1996; 2001-2005	Liverpool; Sunderland	98	5	6	0	1	110	18	
183	(Portugal) Luís Boa Morte	2007–2011	Fulham	91	8	10	0	0	109	2	
183	(England) James Bigden	1899–1904	Gravesend United	102	7	0	0	0	109	3	Includes 13 appearances for Thames Ironworks F.C.
183	(England) George Butcher	1909–1921	St Albans City	96	13	0	0	0	109	22	
183	(England) Ben Johnson	2019–2024	Academy	69	11	9	20	0	109	2	
187	(England) Jermain Defoe	2000–2004	Academy	93	5	7	0	0	105	41	
187	(England) Joseph Hughes	1911–1915	Academy	90	15	0	0	0	105	0	
187	(England) Harry Kinsell	1951–1955	Reading	101	4	0	0	0	105	2	
187	(Republic of Ireland) Joey O'Brien	2011–2016	Bolton Wanderers	91	5	4	5	0	105	3	
187	(England) Bill Robinson	1949–1951	Charlton Athletic	101	4	0	0	0	105	61	
192	(England) Bob Fairman	1909–1912	Birmingham City	91	12	0	0	0	103	0	
192	(France) Kurt Zouma	2021–2025	Chelsea	82	4	0	17	0	103	6	
194	(England) David James	2001–2004	Aston Villa	91	6	5	0	0	102	0	
194	(England) Ken Tucker	1947–1957	Finchley	91	6	5	0	0	102	0	
196	(England) Dick Leafe	1913–1922	Sheffield United	94	7	0	0	0	101	44	
196	(Denmark) Marc Rieper	1994–1998	(Denmark) Brøndby	90	4	7	0	0	101	5	
198	(Scotland) Tom McAlister	1981–1989	Swindon Town	85	7	7	0	1	100	0	

== West Ham United's England Internationals ==
To date, there have been forty-four players represent the senior England team whilst playing for West Ham United.

- Bold indicates player is still with West Ham United
  - Correct as of match played 15 November 2026, vs Spain

	Player	West Ham Career	England Caps	England Goals	First cap as WHU player
1	George Webb	1909–1912	2	1	Wales, 13 March 1911
2	Vic Watson	1920–1935	5	4	Wales, 5 March 1923
3	Jack Tresadern	1914–1924	2	0	Scotland, 14 April 1923
4	Billy Moore	1922–1929	1	2	Sweden, 24 May 1923
5	Billy Brown	1921–1924	1	1	Belgium, 1 November 1923
5	Ted Hufton	1919–1932	6	0	Belgium, 1 November 1923
7	Stan Earle	1924–1932	2	0	France, 17 May 1924
8	Jimmy Ruffell	1921–1937	6	0	Scotland, 17 April 1926
9	Jim Barrett	1924–1945	1	0	Ireland, 22 October 1928
10	Len Goulden	1932–1940	14	4	Norway, 14 May 1937
11	Jackie Morton	1931–1939	1	1	Czechoslovakia, 1 December 1937
12	Ken Brown	1952–1967	1	0	Northern Ireland, 18 November 1959
13	Bobby Moore	1958–1974	108	2	Peru, 20 May 1962
14	Johnny Byrne	1962–1967	11	8	Switzerland, 5 June 1963
15	Geoff Hurst	1959–1972	49	24	West Germany, 23 February 1966
16	Martin Peters	1959–1970	67	20	Yugoslavia, 4 May 1966
17	Frank Lampard, Sr.	1967–1985	2	0	Yugoslavia, 11 October 1972
18	Trevor Brooking	1967–1984	47	5	Portugal, 3 April 1974
19	Alan Devonshire	1976–1990	8	0	Northern Ireland, 20 May 1980
20	Alvin Martin	1977–1996	17	0	Brazil, 12 May 1981
21	Paul Goddard	1980–1987	1	1	Iceland, 2 June 1982
22	Tony Cottee	1983–1988; 1994–1996	7	0	Sweden, 10 September 1986
23	Rio Ferdinand	1996–2000	81	3	Cameroon, 15 November 1997
24	Ian Wright	1998–1999	33	9	Luxembourg, 14 October 1998
25	Stuart Pearce	1999–2001	78	5	Luxembourg, 4 September 1999
26	Frank Lampard, Jr.	1996–2001	106	29	Belgium, 10 October 1999
27	Michael Carrick	1999–2004	34	0	Mexico, 25 May 2001
27	Joe Cole	1999–2003; 2013–2014	56	10	Mexico, 25 May 2001
29	David James	2001–2004	53	0	Netherlands, 15 August 2001
30	Trevor Sinclair	1998–2003	12	0	Sweden, 10 November 2001
31	Paul Konchesky	2005–2007	2	0	Argentina, 12 November 2005
32	Kieron Dyer	2007–2011	33	0	Germany, 22 August 2007
33	Matthew Upson	2007–2011	21	2	Switzerland, 6 February 2008
34	Dean Ashton	2006–2009	1	0	Trinidad and Tobago, 1 June 2008
35	Carlton Cole	2006–2015	7	0	Spain, 11 February 2009
35	Robert Green	2006–2012	12	0	Spain, 11 February 2009
37	Scott Parker	2007–2011	18	0	Denmark, 9 February 2011
38	Andy Carroll	2012–2019	9	2	San Marino, 12 October 2012
39	Stewart Downing	2013–2015	35	0	Scotland, 18 November 2014
40	Aaron Cresswell	2014–2025	3	0	Spain, 15 November 2016
41	Joe Hart	2017–2018	75	0	Malta, 1 September 2017
42	Declan Rice	2017–2023	82	8	Czech Republic, 22 March 2019
43	Jesse Lingard	2021	32	6	San Marino, 25 March 2021
**44**	**Jarrod Bowen**	**2020–present**	**22**	**1**	Hungary, 4 June 2022

== Club captains ==
Dates	Captain
1895–1897	(Scotland) Robert Stevenson
1897–1899	(England) Walter Tranter
1899	(England) Harry Bradshaw
1899–1901	(England) Charlie Dove
1901–1902	(Scotland) Roddy McEachrane
1903–1904	(England) Ernest Watts
1904–1907	(Scotland) Dave Gardner
1907–1911	(England) Frank Piercy
1911–1914	(England) Tommy Randall
1914–1915	(England) Dick Leafe
1915–1922	(England) William Cope
1922–1925	(England) George Kay
1925–1926	(England) Billy Moore
1926–1928	(England) Jack Hebden
1928–1932	(England) Stan Earle
1932–1937	(England) Jim Barrett Sr.
1937	(England) Joe Cockcroft
1937–1945	(England) Charlie Bicknell
1945–1951	(England) Dick Walker
1951–1957	(England) Malcolm Allison
1957–1960	(Republic of Ireland) Noel Cantwell
1960–1962	(Wales) Phil Woosnam
1962–1974	(England) Bobby Moore
1974–1984	(England) Billy Bonds
1984–1989	(England) Alvin Martin
1989–1993	(England) Julian Dicks
1994–1995	(England) Steve Potts
1995–1997	(England) Julian Dicks
1997–2001	(Northern Ireland) Steve Lomas
2001–2003	(Italy) Paolo Di Canio
2003–2005	(Scotland) Christian Dailly
2005–2007	(England) Nigel Reo-Coker
2007–2009	(Australia) Lucas Neill
2009–2011	(England) Matthew Upson
2011–2015	(England) Kevin Nolan
2015–2022	(England) Mark Noble
2022–2023	(England) Declan Rice
2023–2024	(France) Kurt Zouma
2024–present	(England) Jarrod Bowen
