= 1932–33 West Ham United F.C. season =

English football team season

West Ham United
1932–33 season
- Chairman: William White
- Manager: Syd King/Charlie Paynter
- Stadium: Boleyn Ground
- First Division: First Division 22nd
- FA Cup: Semi-Final
- Top goalscorer: League: Vic Watson (24); All: Vic Watson (28)
Home colours

The 1932–33 season was West Ham's first season back in the Second Division following their relegation in the previous season. The club were managed at the start of the season by Syd King.

== Season summary ==
Two days after losing their ninth game of the season, on 7 November King was sacked. He was replaced by Charlie Paynter. King who was reputed to have had problems with alcohol and had previously turned up at board meetings drunk and had taken West Ham's relegation the previous season badly such that it had affected his mental health. A month after his sacking, King committed suicide by drinking alcohol laced with a "corrosive substance". An inquest into his death concluded that he had been suffering from paranoia and that he had taken his life "whilst of unsound mind".

In the league, they finished in 20th place just one place above a relegation spot having not been higher than 16th all season. Their defence was the poorest in the league ranking 22nd letting in 93 goals at an average of 2.21 goals every game. A run of four wins in their last five games moved them out of the relegation places with one game of the season remaining. This included their only away win of the season, at Old Trafford against Manchester United. The winning goal in a 2–1 victory was scored by Arthur Wilson who many years later recalled the goal; "It was a real belter from 30 yards. The ball hit the underside of the bar and struck the goalkeeper on the back of the neck before crossing the line. The force of the shot knocked him to the floor". The players were promised a continental tour if they managed to beat relegation. This did not materialize.

The club's top scorer was Vic Watson with 28 goals; 24 in the league and four in the FA Cup.

West Ham reached the semi-final of the FA Cup before losing to Everton whose goals were scored by Dixie Dean and Ted Critchley. Everton went on to contest, and win, an all Lancashire final against Manchester City.

=== Second Division ===
Pos	Team	Pld	W	D	L	GF	GA	GAv	Pts	Promotion or relegation
18	Lincoln City	42	12	13	17	72	87	0.828	37	
19	Burnley	42	11	14	17	67	79	0.848	36	
20	West Ham United	42	13	9	20	75	93	0.806	35	
21	Chesterfield (R)	42	12	10	20	61	84	0.726	34	Relegation to the Third Division North
22	Charlton Athletic (R)	42	12	7	23	60	91	0.659	31	Relegation to the Third Division South

Rules for classification: 1) Points; 2) Goal average; 3) Goals scored
(R) Relegated

== Results ==
West Ham United's score comes first

=== Legend ===
Win	Draw	Loss

=== Football League Second Division ===
Date	Opponent	Venue	Result	Attendance	Scorers
27 August 1932	Swansea City	A	0-1	15,247	
29 August 1932	Bradford City	H	2-4	10,964	Pollard, Mills
3 September 1932	Notts County	H	1-1	10,656	Puddefoot
7 September 1932	Bradford City	A	1-5	17,137	Watson
10 September 1932	Port Vale	A	0-4	9,582	
17 September 1932	Millwall	H	3-0	25,496	Watson (2), Morton
24 September 1932	Southampton	A	3-4	11,636	Watson, Morton (2)
1 October 1932	Bury	A	0-1	12,848	
8 October 1932	Lincoln City	A	0-6	9,887	
15 October 1932	Oldham Athletic	H	5-2	13,161	Norris (3), Watson, Morton
22 October 1932	Preston North End	A	1-4	8,525	Mills
29 October 1932	Burnley	H	4-4	12,009	Watson (3), Morton
5 November 1932	Bradford Park Avenue	A	0-3	14,861	
12 November 1932	Grimsby Town	H	5-2	11,481	Yews, Watson, Wilson (2), Jacobson (og)
19 November 1932	Stoke City	A	0-0	11,225	
26 November 1932	Charlton Athletic	H	7-3	18,347	Barrett, Yews, Watson (2), Wilson (2), Morton
3 December 1932	Nottingham Forest	A	2-2	7,399	Watson, Wilson
10 December 1932	Manchester United	H	3-1	13,435	Watson (2), Wilson
17 December 1932	Tottenham Hotspur	A	2-2	45,129	Morton, Whatley (og)
24 December 1932	Plymouth Argyle	H	2-2	21,312	Barrett, Morton
26 December 1932	Fulham	A	2-4	26,932	Watson, Puddefoot
27 December 1932	Fulham	H	1-1	32,237	Watson
31 December 1932	Swansea City	H	3-1	16,876	Barrett, Watson (2)
7 January 1933	Notts County	A	0-2	11,437	
21 January 1933	Port Vale	H	5-0	13,908	Barrett, Watson (2), Wilson (2)
31 January 1933	Millwall	A	0-1	4,063	
4 February 1933	Southampton	H	3-1	16,521	Watson, Wilson (2)
11 February 1933	Bury	A	1-6	7,516	Barrett
6 March 1933	Preston North End	H	1-1	8,648	Puddefoot
11 March 1933	Burnley	A	0-4	10,771	
13 March 1933	Oldham Athletic	A	2-3	7,159	Mills, Wood
20 March 1933	Bradford Park Avenue	H	2-1	7,258	Watson (2)
25 March 1933	Grimsby Town	A	1-2	8,546	Wilson
27 March 1933	Lincoln City	H	0-0	9,836	
1 April 1933	Stoke City	H	1-2	19,104	Barrett
8 April 1933	Charlton Athletic	A	1-3	21,487	Barrett
14 April 1933	Chesterfield	A	0-1	11,974	
15 April 1933	Nottingham Forest	H	4-3	16,925	Barrett, Wood, Goulden, Morton
17 April 1933	Chesterfield	H	3-1	18,394	Pollard, Watson, Morton
22 April 1933	Manchester United	A	2-1	14,958	Morton, Wilson
29 April 1933	Tottenham Hotspur	H	1-0	31,706	Wilson
6 May 1933	Plymouth Argyle	A	1-4	10,444	Hardie (og)

=== FA Cup ===
Round	Date	Opponent	Venue	Result	Attendance	Goalscorers
R3	14 January 1933	Corinthians	A	2-0	16,421	Pollard, Watson
R4	28 January 1933	West Bromwich Albion	H	2-0	37,222	Wilson, Watson
R5	18 February 1933	Brighton & Hove Albion	A	2-2	32,310	Musgrave, Watson
R5 Replay	22 February 1933	Brighton & Hove Albion	H	1-0	36,742	Morton
R6	4 March 1933	Birmingham City	H	4-0	44,242	Pollard, Wilson, Morton, Barkas (og)
Semi-Final	18 March 1933	Everton	Molineux	1-2	37,936	Watson

== Squad ==
Note: Flags indicate national team as defined under FIFA eligibility rules; some limited exceptions apply. Players may hold more than one non-FIFA nationality.

Pos.	Nation	Player
DF	ENG	Jim Barrett
MF	ENG	Albert Cadwell
DF	ENG	Alfred Chalkley
DF	ENG	Joe Cockroft
DF	ENG	Jimmy Collins
FW	ENG	Dickie Deacon
DF	ENG	Bob Dixon
DF	ENG	Alfred Earl
FW	ENG	Ted Fenton
DF	ENG	William Fryatt
DF	ENG	Reg Goodacre
FW	ENG	Len Goulden
FW	ENG	William Johnson
GK	SCO	Pat McMahon

Pos.	Nation	Player
FW	SCO	Hugh Mills
FW	ENG	Jackie Morton
MF	ENG	Joe Musgrave
MF	ENG	Fred Norris
FW	ENG	Walter Pollard
FW	ENG	Syd Puddefoot
FW	ENG	Jimmy Ruffell
MF	ENG	Wally St Pier
DF	ENG	Albert Walker
GK	ENG	George Watson
FW	ENG	Vic Watson
MF	ENG	Arthur Wilson
FW	ENG	Jim Wood
MF	ENG	Tommy Yews
