= 1931–32 West Ham United F.C. season =

English football team season

West Ham United
1931–32 season
- Chairman: William White
- Manager: Syd King
- Stadium: Boleyn Ground
- First Division: First Division 22nd
- FA Cup: Fourth round
- Top goalscorer: League: Vic Watson (23); All: Vic Watson (25)
Home colours

The 1931–32 season was West Ham's eighth season in the First Division since their promotion in season 1922–23. The club were managed by Syd King.

== Season summary ==
As a warm-up to the season West Ham completed a three match unbeaten tour of Switzerland and began the season with their first ever win at Bolton's Burnden Park. This would be one of only 12 wins all season which saw poor form for the team. February saw the return of Syd Puddefoot to the club, after ten years away, but his seven appearances and no goals did nothing to stave off relegation. West Ham gained a single point from their last 10 games, finished 22nd and bottom and were relegated to the Second Division. Vic Watson was the top scorer with 25 goals in all competitions. He was also top scorer in the league with 23. Jimmy Ruffell made the most appearances; 41 in all competitions.

Relegation for West Ham had a dramatic effect on the mental health of manager King. Suffering from delusions, these became chronic during the season and were a factor towards his sacking and death the following season.

West Ham made the fourth round of the FA Cup before being eliminated by Chelsea.

=== First Division ===
Pos	Team	Pld	W	D	L	GF	GA	GAv	Pts	Relegation
18	Middlesbrough	42	15	8	19	64	89	0.719	38	
19	Leicester City	42	15	7	20	74	94	0.787	37	
20	Blackpool	42	12	9	21	65	102	0.637	33	
21	Grimsby Town (R)	42	13	6	23	67	98	0.684	32	Relegation to the Second Division
22	West Ham United (R)	42	12	7	23	62	107	0.579	31	Relegation to the Second Division

Source: World Football
Rules for classification: 1) Points; 2) Goal average; 3) Goals scored
(R) Relegated

== Results ==
West Ham United's score comes first

=== Legend ===
Win	Draw	Loss

=== Football League First Division ===
Date	Opponent	Venue	Result	Attendance	Scorers
29 August 1931	Bolton Wanderers	A	1–0	15,740	Watson
31 August 1931	Chelsea	H	3–1	28,338	Norris, Weldon, Watson
5 September 1931	Middlesbrough	H	0–2	23,129	
7 September 1931	Sheffield United	A	0–6	11,055	
12 September 1931	Huddersfield	A	1–3	11,986	Watson
19 September 1931	Newcastle United	H	2–1	21,558	Watson, Ruffell
21 September 1931	Sheffield United	H	1–2	12,075	Ruffell
26 September 1931	Aston Villa	A	2–5	39,619	Wood, Tate (og)
3 October 1931	Leicester City	H	1–4	20,196	Weldon
10 October 1931	Liverpool	A	2–2	23,819	Weldon, Gibbins
17 October 1931	Manchester City	A	1–0	18,310	Ruffell
24 October 1931	Portsmouth	H	2–1	18,092	Ruffell (2)
31 October 1931	Derby County	A	1–5	10,424	Watson
7 November 1931	West Bromwich Albion	H	1–5	20,685	Ruffell
14 November 1931	Arsenal	A	1–4	41,028	Watson
21 November 1931	Blackpool	H	1–1	14,800	Ruffell
28 November 1931	Blackburn Rovers	A	4–2	8,426	Barrett, Phillips, Gibbins, Watson
5 December 1931	Everton	H	4–2	34,109	Ruffell (3), Wood
12 December 1931	Birmingham	A	1–4	19,725	Watson
19 December 1931	Sunderland	H	2–2	6,505	Barrett, Watson
25 December 1931	Grimsby	A	1–2	15,132	Barrett
26 December 1931	Grimsby Town	H	3–1	23,859	Watson, Ruffell (2)
2 January 1932	Bolton Wanderers	H	3–1	15,997	Ruffell, Watson (2)
16 January 1932	Middlesbrough	A	2–3	8,287	Watson (2)
30 January 1932	Newcastle United	A	2–2	31,942	Cadwell, Watson
1 February 1932	Huddersfield Town	H	1–1	8,631	Watson
6 February 1932	Aston Villa	H	2–1	25,438	Yews, Phillips
18 February 1932	Leicester City	A	1–2	9,983	Ruffell
20 February 1932	Liverpool	H	1–0	15,721	Ruffell
2 March 1932	Manchester City	H	1–1	13,524	Chalkley
5 March 1932	Portsmouth	A	0–3	14,031	
12 March 1932	Derby County	H	2–1	19,635	Watson, Ruffell
19 March 1932	West Bromwich Albion	A	1–3	19,002	Phillips
23 March 1932	Sheffield Wednesday	H	1–2	19,794	Ruffell
26 March 1932	Arsenal	H	1–1	34,852	Watson
28 March 1932	Sheffield Wednesday	A	1–6	14,848	Watson
2 April 1932	Blackpool	A	2–7	13,092	Morton, Watson
9 April 1932	Blackburn Rovers	H	1–3	10,136	Watson
16 April 1932	Everton	A	1–6	26,997	Cresswell (og)
23 April 1932	Birmingham	H	2–4	10,983	Watson, Weldon
30 April 1932	Sunderland	A	0–2	13,528	
7 May 1932	Chelsea	A	2–3	24,386	Yews, Barrett

=== FA Cup ===
Round	Date	Opponent	Venue	Result	Attendance	Goalscorers
R3	9 January 1932	Charlton Athletic	A	2–1	26,500	Watson (2)
R4	23 January 1932	Chelsea	A	1–3	36,657	Weldon

== Squad ==
Note: Flags indicate national team as defined under FIFA eligibility rules; some limited exceptions apply. Players may hold more than one non-FIFA nationality.

Pos.	Nation	Player
DF	ENG	Jim Barrett
MF	ENG	Albert Cadwell
DF	ENG	Alfred Chalkley
DF	ENG	Jimmy Collins
DF	ENG	Charlie Cox (captain)
DF	ENG	Bob Dixon
DF	ENG	Alfred Earl
FW	ENG	Vivian Gibbins
DF	ENG	Reg Goodacre
FW	ENG	Jim Harris
GK	ENG	Ted Hufton
FW	WAL	Wilf James
FW	ENG	Jackie Morton

Pos.	Nation	Player
FW	ENG	Joe Musgrave
MF	ENG	Fred Norris
FW	ENG	Wilf Phillips
FW	ENG	Walter Pollard
FW	ENG	Syd Puddefoot
MF	ENG	Wally St Pier
DF	ENG	Reg Wade
DF	ENG	William Wade
FW	ENG	Vic Watson
MF	ENG	Tony Weldon
FW	ENG	Jim Wood
MF	ENG	Tommy Yews
