= Puddefoot =

Puddefoot is a surname. Notable people with the surname include:

- Len Puddefoot (1898–1996), English footballer and manager
- Susanne Puddefoot (1934–2010), English journalist and editor
- Syd Puddefoot (1894–1972), English footballer and cricketer
- Walter Puddefoot, English footballer
