= Charles Cotton (footballer) =

English footballer (1880–1910)

Charlie Cotton
Personal information
- Full name: Francis Charles Thomas Cotton
- Date of birth: 23 December 1880
- Place of birth: East Stonehouse, Plymouth, England
- Date of death: 3 January 1910 (aged 29)
- Position: Goalkeeper

Senior career*
Years	Team	Apps	(Gls)
1897–1900	Sheppey United		
1900–1903	Reading		
1903	West Ham United	8	(0)
1903–1904	Liverpool	12	(0)
1904–1906	West Ham United	10	(0)
1906–1910	Southend United		
- * Club domestic league appearances and goals

Francis Charles Thomas Cotton (23 December 1880 – 3 January 1910) was an English footballer who played as a goalkeeper in the Football League for Liverpool. He also played for Sheppey United, Reading, West Ham United and Southend United.

Born in East Stonehouse, Cotton played for Sheppey United and Reading before moving to east London club West Ham United in the summer of 1903 along with Ernest Watts, Herbert Lyon and Tommy Allison. He made his debut against rival club Millwall on the opening day of the season. After eight Southern League appearances and one in the FA Cup, Cotton lost his place to Fred Griffiths and moved to Liverpool.

Cotton made his Liverpool debut against Nottingham Forest on 1 January 1904 and kept his place until a 5–2 defeat against Everton in the Merseyside derby on 1 April resulted in the return of Peter Platt in goal. He totalled 12 League appearances during 1903–04 and witnessed the club's relegation to the Second Division at the end of the season. He then returned to West Ham in September 1904, and made 10 appearances over two seasons, being kept out of the team for the most part by Matthew Kingsley. He left for Southend United upon the club's formation in 1906.

Cotton missed a single match in four seasons at Southend before he contracted Bright's disease. After a five-week illness, he died on 3 January 1910.
