= Charlie Cox (disambiguation) =

Charlie Cox (born 1982) is an English actor.

Charlie Cox may also refer to:

- Charlie Cox (footballer, born 1905) (1905–1978), English footballer
- Charlie Cox (footballer, born 1926) (1926–2008), Scottish footballer
- Charlie Cox (Australian footballer) (1873–1947), Australian rules footballer
- Charlie Cox (racing driver) (born 1960), Australia motor racing commentator

== See also ==
- Charles Cox (disambiguation)
