= Chalkley =

Chalkley is an English surname. It was originally given to people from a location most likely in Southern England, due to the abundance of chalk and the high occurrence of the surname in the area. Notable people with the surname include:

- Alfred Chalkley (1904–1971), English footballer
- Dean Chalkley (born 1968), English photographer
- Dominique Provost-Chalkley (born 1990), English actress
- Frederick Chalkley (1875–?), English association football player
- George Chalkley (1883–1963), English football player
