= Dick Leafe =

English footballer

Personal information
- Full name: Alfred Richard Leafe
- Date of birth: Q4 1891
- Place of birth: Boston, Lincolnshire, England
- Date of death: 9 May 1964 (aged 72)
- Place of death: Ramsgate, Kent, England
- Height: 5 ft 9 1/2 in (1.77 m)
- Position: Forward

Senior career*
Years	Team	Apps	(Gls)
1909	Boston Town		
1909	Grimsby Town	1	(0)
1910	Boston Town		
1910–1913	Sheffield United	28	(15)
1913–1922	West Ham United	94	(40)
- * Club domestic league appearances and goals

Alfred Richard Leafe (1891 – 9 May 1964) was a professional footballer who played in various forward positions in the Football League for Grimsby Town, Sheffield United and West Ham United. He also played for Boston Town. After retirement, he worked as assistant secretary at West Ham.

== Career ==
Leafe started his football career with Boston Town alongside his brother, Tom. He signed as an amateur for Football League Second Division club Grimsby Town in May 1909. He made a single appearance for the Lincolnshire club in 1909–10 and returned to Boston.

November 1910 saw Leafe sign for Sheffield United, where he scored 15 goals in his 28 First Division appearances during the 1911–12 season.

In 1913, Leafe made the move to West Ham United, then of the Southern League First Division. Manager Syd King brought in Leafe to replace Danny Shea, who had just been sold to Blackburn Rovers for £2,000 (at that point a British record).

He made his debut on 6 September 1913, a home game against Swindon Town that coincided with the opening of the new West Stand at Upton Park. He scored twice and followed this up with goals in the next three games. He ended the 1913–14 season as the club's top scorer with 20 goals in his 33 league appearances.

With Leafe moving to inside-left in order to accommodate centre-forward Syd Puddefoot, a partnership developed and in 1914–15, Puddefoot's 18 goals and Leafe's 13 contributed to a fourth-place finish and election to the Football League. This was despite both players being moved (Leafe to outside-right) to accommodate Arthur Stallard for the final two months of the season.

Leafe made five appearances in the London Combination after the outbreak of the First World War. When competitive football resumed, he played 15 games in 1919-20 for the club, who had been elected to the Football League Second Division, but did not score. In 1920–21, Leafe scored 7 goals in 13 games, but made just three appearances the following season after the signing of Vic Watson (who would go on to break West Ham's all-time goalscoring record). He retired from playing and took on the job of assistant secretary at the club. He remained in the role until the outbreak of the Second World War, when the club's management was forced to reduce staff numbers.

Leafe died in May 1964, aged 72.

== Bibliography ==
- Blows, Kirk; Hogg, Tony (2000). The Essential History of West Ham United. Headline. ISBN 0-7472-7036-8.
