= Frank Piercy =

English footballer (1879–1931)

Personal information
- Date of birth: 1879
- Place of birth: Haverton Hill, England
- Date of death: 1931 (aged 51–52)
- Position: Centre back

Senior career*
Years	Team	Apps	(Gls)
1899–1904	Middlesbrough	4	(0)
1904–1912	West Ham United	214	(7)
- * Club domestic league appearances and goals

Frank Piercy (1879–1931) was an English footballer who played for Middlesbrough and West Ham United as a centre back.

Piercy was born in Haverton Hill, near Stockton-on-Tees, County Durham, and upon leaving school he became a blacksmith playing amateur football in Southbank for a junior team in the Teessiders Minor League. He joined Middlesbrough in 1901 becoming a professional player. He played only four games for the club.

In 1904 manager Syd King signed Piercy for West Ham United from Middlesbrough, along with Christopher Carrick. He appointed him as captain in 1907 to replace David Gardner who had retired the previous season. Nicknamed "The Old War Horse" during his time at West Ham, Piercy had a tough tackling style and was regularly in trouble with referees. He was once suspended for a month, in September 1907, for punching an opposition player in a match against Swindon Town. In October with little regard for his previous suspension he was sent-off again in a match against Millwall. Piercy tackled Millwall's Charlie Comrie, resulting in him being carried from "the field in an unconscious state". Piercy was again suspended.

Despite his disciplinary problems Piercy became the first West Ham United player to play 200 games when he appeared on 17 April 1911 against Southampton. Tommy Randall replaced Piercy as captain for the 1911–12 season and on 20 January 1912 Piercy was injured against Plymouth Argyle in what turned out to be his final game for West Ham. After playing 214 games he retired from playing and was appointed assistant trainer under Charlie Paynter with responsibility for the reserve team. He was awarded two benefit or testimonial games. The first in 1910 when he was allowed to keep the gate receipts from a West Ham game against New Brompton and posthumously in 1931 when an Isthmian League side played West Ham on 1 October 1931. Piercy was also a member of Essex County bowls team, a cricketer for local teams and held a golf handicap of two.

He died in 1931.
