= Tommy Allison =

Scottish footballer

Personal information
- Date of birth: 1875
- Place of birth: Edinburgh, Scotland
- Date of death: 4 March 1961 (aged 85–86)
- Position: Wing-half

Youth career
- Strathclyde

Senior career*
Years	Team	Apps	(Gls)
1888–1901	New Brighton Tower	66	(1)
1901–1903	Reading		
1903–1909	West Ham United	156	(7)
- * Club domestic league appearances and goals

Tommy Allison (1875 – 4 March 1961) was a Scottish footballer who played as a left-half in the English Football League for New Brighton Tower, and in the Southern League for Reading and West Ham United.

Having won a Scottish junior cap with Strathclyde, Allison started his senior career in 1899 at Second Division club New Brighton Tower, where he made 66 league appearances. After New Brighton Tower folded in 1901, Allison moved to Reading. He spent two seasons at the Berkshire club before joining West Ham United, along with Charles Cotton, Herbert Lyon and Ernie Watts, for their final season at the Memorial Grounds in 1903–04.

After scoring on his West Ham debut, against Kettering Town in September 1903, Allison went on to make 156 Southern League appearances for the club, scoring seven goals, and often deputised as captain. He also made nine appearances in the FA Cup. He became the first West Ham player to receive a benefit match on 14 December 1907, a Western League fixture against Portsmouth. He played his final game for West Ham on 10 April 1909, a 3–1 home victory against Watford.
