= Harry Earle =

English footballer

Personal information
- Full name: Henry Thomas Earle
- Date of birth: 23 November 1868
- Place of birth: East Grinstead, England
- Date of death: 1951 (aged 82–83)
- Positions: Centre-half; goalkeeper

Senior career*
Years	Team	Apps	(Gls)
- Poplar Trinity
- Millwall Athletic
- Royal Arsenal
- Clapton
1904–1905	Notts County	23	(0)
- * Club domestic league appearances and goals

Henry Thomas Earle (23 November 1868 – 1951), known as Harry Earle, was an English footballer who played as a centre-half and goalkeeper for Millwall Athletic, Clapton and Notts County from the 1890s to the early part of the 20th century.

Earle was born in East Grinstead, and was employed at Godwin Road School in Forest Gate. Although he wasn't qualified as a teacher, he was eventually co-opted as such, due to his 33 years of service.

His appearance for Clapton once sparked an article in the local newspaper after he had requested permission to leave work early to attend a game. Previous requests had been declined, but this time, his request was granted following a vote. In the article, members of the West Ham School Board described football, and cricket, as being a waste of time. This denunciation of sport was supported by the local priest, Father Ring, who said that it was only a little less of a scandal than the drinking business.

Further controversy was to come when he was declared to be a professional by the Football Association. He had accepted a set of furniture from Clapton as a wedding gift and the FA had deemed this to be a form of payment. Both Earle and the club unsuccessfully appealed. As a result, Earle signed as a professional with Notts County, where he played in the Football League for one season. He continued to be the trainer of West Ham Schools throughout his playing career and beyond his retirement, leaving the role in 1912.

When he returned to the Old Spotted Dog Ground with his new club in 1905 for a friendly match, he encountered opposite number J. Wilding, who had once been the West Ham Schools goalkeeper under his charge. Wilding would go on to play for Clapton in two FA Amateur Cup finals.

Married to Emma Elizabeth Earle, he was the father of six children, one of whom, Stan Earle also played for Clapton, and for England as an Amateur and Full International and later, as a professional player, with West Ham United between 1924 and 1932.

Harry Earle died in 1951. His obituary, in the Stratford Express, was adamant that he had never once accepted a pay packet despite the imposition of his professional status.
