= Matt Kingsley (footballer) =

English footballer (1874–1960)

Personal information
- Full name: Matthew Kingsley
- Date of birth: 30 September 1874
- Place of birth: Edgworth, Lancashire, England
- Date of death: 27 March 1960 (aged 85)
- Place of death: Leigh, Lancashire, England
- Position: Goalkeeper

Senior career*
Years	Team	Apps	(Gls)
- Turton
1896–1898	Darwen		
1898–1904	Newcastle United	180	(0)
1904–1905	West Ham United	29	(0)
1905–1906	Queens Park Rangers	20	(0)
1906–1907	Barrow		
1907	Rochdale		

International career
1901	England	1	(0)
- * Club domestic league appearances and goals

Matthew Kingsley (30 September 1874 – 27 March 1960) was a footballer who played as goalkeeper for Darwen, Newcastle United, West Ham United, Queens Park Rangers, Barrow and Rochdale.

== Club career ==
In all, Kingsley made 180 appearances in six First Division seasons at Newcastle United and nine appearances in the FA Cup, which included an infamous cup exit at Southampton in 1900.

Kingsley lost his place to Jimmy Lawrence midway through the 1903–04 season and moved on to West Ham United. Kingsley departed West Ham after kicking former West Ham player Herbert Lyon in a game against Brighton & Hove Albion in March 1905, causing a crowd invasion and a near riot.

== International career ==
In 1901 he became the first player to receive a call-up to the England national team whilst at Newcastle. Kingsley played the full 90 minutes in a 6–0 victory for England against Wales in a British Home Championship at St James' Park on 18 March 1901.
