= Roy Goulden =

English footballer

Personal information
- Full name: Roy Leonard Goulden
- Date of birth: 22 September 1937 (age 89)
- Place of birth: Ilford, England
- Position: Inside forward

Youth career
- 1953–1959: Arsenal

Senior career*
Years	Team	Apps	(Gls)
1959–1961	Arsenal	1	(0)
1961–1962	Southend United	9	(2)
1962–1963	Ipswich Town	0	(0)
- Stevenage
- Gravesend & Northfleet
- Dunstable Town
Total		10	(2)
- * Club domestic league appearances and goals

Roy Leonard Goulden (born 22 September 1937) is an English former professional footballer who played as an inside forward.

== Career ==
Born in Ilford, Goulden is the son of ex-England international Len Goulden. He joined Arsenal in 1953, turned professional in September 1954, and made his debut in February 1959. After spells with Southend United and Ipswich Town, Goulden played non-league football with Stevenage, Gravesend & Northfleet and Dunstable Town.
