= Wally St Pier =

English footballer and scout

Personal information
- Full name: Stanley Walter St Pier
- Date of birth: 8 October 1904
- Place of birth: Beacontree Heath, Dagenham, England
- Date of death: 1989 (aged 84–85)
- Place of death: Daventry, England
- Position: Centre-half

Senior career*
Years	Team	Apps	(Gls)
19??–1929	Ilford		
1929–1933	West Ham United	24	(0)
- * Club domestic league appearances and goals

Stanley Walter St Pier (8 October 1904 – 1989) was an English footballer and scout.

== Career ==
St Pier arrived at West Ham United from Ilford in April 1929 making his senior debut in October 1929 against Leicester City. Spending most of his time as understudy to Jim Barrett, St Pier managed only 24 appearances for The Hammers before retiring from playing in 1932. St Pier was appointed club chief scout by manager Charlie Paynter and was responsible for the discovery of John Lyall, Bobby Moore, Geoff Hurst, Martin Peters, Pat Holland, Frank Lampard, Paul Brush, Alan Curbishley, Trevor Brooking and Mervyn Day amongst others, through his scouting network. Given a testimonial in May 1975, he retired in 1976 after 47 years service to West Ham.

== Death ==
St Pier died in 1989.
