= Stan Earle =

English footballer and manager

Personal information
- Full name: Stanley George James Earle
- Date of birth: 6 September 1897
- Place of birth: Stratford, England
- Date of death: 26 September 1971 (aged 74)
- Place of death: Colchester, England
- Height: 6 ft 1 in (1.85 m)
- Position: Inside right

Senior career*
Years	Team	Apps	(Gls)
–1922	Clapton		
1922–1924	Arsenal	4	(3)
1924–1932	West Ham United	258	(56)
1932–1933	Clapton Orient	15	(1)

International career
1922–1923	England Amateur	2	(1)
1924–1927	England	2	(0)

Managerial career
- Leyton
- * Club domestic league appearances and goals

Stanley George James Earle (6 September 1897 – 26 September 1971) was an English footballer who played as an inside-right in the Football League for Arsenal, West Ham United and Clapton Orient. He was capped for England at amateur and full levels.

Stan, the son of centre-half and goalkeeper Harry Earle, played for West Ham Schools as a youth. He featured for England Schoolboys in 1912, and captained Essex. He gained England Amateur caps against Ireland in 1922–23, and against Ireland and France in 1923–24. Earle featured for the FA XI against the Army in both seasons, and also represented the Isthmian League. He represented The Amateurs in the 1923 Charity Shield.

Earle played in the Isthmian League with Vivian Gibbins at Clapton, and joined Arsenal as an amateur in March 1922. He made four League appearances for the north London club, scoring three goals, and had his registration cancelled in July 1924.

Earle continued to play for Clapton and became club captain. He won the FA Amateur Cup with the club in 1924.

Earle left the Dog to join the professional ranks at West Ham United in August 1924. After 18 appearances and 6 goals in his first season, his second saw 38 appearances and 9 goals, including his first appearance for the club in the FA Cup, a 5–0 thrashing at the hands of Tottenham Hotspur. He was an ever-present in 1926–27, playing in all 45 league and cup games – an achievement matched only by Jim Barrett, Jimmy Collins and Vic Watson.

Earle made 37 appearances in 1928–29, including all of the games in that season's FA Cup run. He played his final game for West Ham on 23 April 1932, a 2–4 loss to Birmingham at Upton Park, and left having scored 58 goals in 273 First Division and FA Cup games during his eight years at the club.

He made two appearances for the full England team, the first in a 3–1 victory against France on 17 May 1924 where he played alongside his Clapton colleague Gibbins. After being selected as a reserve for England's game against Ireland on 24 October 1925, he didn't see further action with the national team until 1927, age 30. The 2–0 defeat against Northern Ireland saw Hammers goalkeeper Ted Hufton taken to hospital after a broken arm sustained in the first half.

Earle ended his career at Clapton Orient, and went on to coach Walthamstow Avenue and manage Leyton.

He served in the Royal Field Artillery and the Royal Garrison Artillery as a bombardier.
