= Charles Cox =

Charles Cox may refer to:

- Charles Cox (wrestler) (born 1957), Canadian Olympic wrestler
- Charles E. Cox (1860–1936), Indiana Supreme Court judge
- Charles Frederick Cox (1863–1944), Australian soldier
- Charles Winnans Cox (1882–1958), Canadian politician
- Charles Shipley Cox (1922–2015), American oceanographer
- Bud Cox (born Charles Cox, born 1960), American tennis player
- Sir Charles Cox (brewer) (1660–1729), English brewer and MP
- Charles Cox (businessman) (1731–1808), English businessman active in Harwich, Essex
- Charles Chapman Cox, American economist, appointed to the U.S. Securities and Exchange Commission under Ronald Reagan
- Charles Christopher Cox (born 1952), US politician and financial regulator
- Charles B. Cox (1810–1891), American businessman and Wisconsin politician

== See also ==
- Charlie Cox (disambiguation)
- Charles Coxe (1661–1728), MP for Cirencester, and for Gloucester
- Charles Westley Coxe, MP for Cricklade
- Charles Cocks (disambiguation)
