= Charles Cocks =

Charles Cocks may refer to:

- Charles Cocks, 1st Baron Somers (1725–1806), British politician; member of parliament for Reigate
- Charles Cocks (1646–1727), British member of parliament for Droitwich, and for and Worcester

== See also ==
- Charles Cox (disambiguation)
