= Dick Walker (footballer, born 1913) =

English footballer

Personal information
- Full name: Edward Richard Walter Walker
- Date of birth: 22 July 1913
- Place of birth: Hackney, England
- Date of death: February 1988 (aged 74)
- Height: 5 ft 11 in (1.80 m)
- Position: Centre-half

Youth career
- Becontree Athletic

Senior career*
Years	Team	Apps	(Gls)
1932–1933	West Ham United	0	(0)
1933–1934	Park Royal		
1934–1957	West Ham United	292	(2)
- * Club domestic league appearances and goals

Edward Richard Walter Walker (22 July 1913 – February 1988) was an English footballer who played for West Ham United.

He was born in Hackney, London.

Dick Walker's three decade association with West Ham began during the 1932–33 season. Playing for Becontree Athletic on Sunday mornings, Walker was spotted by a club scout and given a trial. He played for the club in the London Midweek League, but moved to west London club Park Royal for the following season.

After a home clash against Park Royal, West Ham re-signed the player and he made his first-team debut as right-half against Burnley on 27 August 1934. After featuring in a number of defensive positions, he finally settled into centre-half as replacement for Jim Barrett in 1936.

During World War II, Walker served with an infantry battalion who fought from El Alamein to Italy and was several times mentioned in dispatches. He played football for the Army whilst on duty in the Middle East and also took leave to play games for West Ham. Upon his return from action, he took the captaincy and played league football with the club until his final game on 18 February 1953, against Plymouth Argyle at Upton Park. He totalled 292 league appearances for the club, scoring two goals. The following four years would see Walker play more than 200 further reserve and A team games until the end of the 1956–57 season, when his playing contract was not renewed by Ted Fenton. He was then offered a job cleaning players' boots at £4 a week (equivalent to £100 in 2025). He received a testimonial in October 1957 against Sparta Rotterdam.

He left the club having made over 600 appearances including wartime competitions.

Walker went on to become coach to Dagenham and later joined Spurs as a scout.
