= Joe Cockroft =

English footballer

- Cockroft at West Ham United

Personal information
- Full name: Joseph Cockroft
- Date of birth: 20 June 1911
- Place of birth: Barnsley, England
- Date of death: 8 February 1994 (aged 82)
- Place of death: Heacham, England
- Height: 5 ft 7 1/2 in (1.71 m)
- Position: Wing half

Senior career*
Years	Team	Apps	(Gls)
	Wombwell	?	(?)
1931–1932	Rotherham United	3	(1)
1932–1933	Gainsborough Trinity	?	(?)
1933–1939	West Ham United	251	(3)
- → West Ham United (wartime)
- → Dartford (guest)
- → Sheffield Wednesday (guest)
1945–1948	Sheffield Wednesday	87	(2)
1948–1949	Sheffield United	12	(0)
1949–19??	Wisbech Town (player-manager)	?	(?)

Managerial career
- 1949–1952: Wisbech Town (player-manager)
- * Club domestic league appearances and goals

Joseph Cockroft (20 June 1911 – February 1994) was an English footballer who played in the Football League for Rotherham United, West Ham United, Sheffield Wednesday and Sheffield United.

Cockroft played for Yorkshire Paper Mills, Barnsley Old Boys, Ardsley Athletic, Wombwell, Rotherham United and then Gainsborough Trinity before moving to West Ham United, then of Division Two, in 1933.

Signed after a months trial from Gainsborough by Charlie Paynter, Cockroft made his West Ham debut on 14 April 1933, having made just four reserve appearances for the club. Drafted in after injuries to first-choice left-halves Albert Cadwell and Joe Musgrave, he made the position his own and rarely missed a game up to the outbreak of World War II.

Cockroft played as a left-half, but often switched positions with Len Goulden during matches to dumbfound oppositions. He was an ever-present in the team for the 1933–34, 1934–35, 1935–36 and 1936–37 seasons, making 217 consecutive appearances.

Cockroft played in the first three games of the 1939–40 season, but these were expunged from the records after the League was suspended following the outbreak of World War II. The war saw Cockroft's home destroyed in the Blitz. He was part of West Ham's War Cup-winning side of 1940, appearing in all 9 games including the final, and made 20 appearances in the League South. He guested for Sheffield Wednesday as direction of labour laws compelled his employment at Edgar Allen and Company, a steelworks in Sheffield. He made 198 wartime appearances for Wednesday, more than any other player, and scored 13 goals. He played for the Owls in the northern final of the War Cup in 1943, and went on to join the club after hostilities ended.

Cockroft spent almost three years at Hillsborough after the war, making a total of 97 appearances in all competitions. His debut came on 5 January 1946 in a goalless FA Cup 3rd round first leg game against Mansfield Town. He went on to play in all of the Owls' FA Cup games in the 1945–46 season; the club were eventually knocked out by Stoke City in the 5th round following comprehensive wins over York City and Mansfield.

He joined Sheffield United for £4,000 in November 1948 and became the oldest First Division debutant as a 37-year-old. He left a year later to take on a player-manager role at Wisbech Town. His tenure of 1,065 days makes him one of Wisbech's longest serving managers.

He was also an FA coach, outside of football, Cockroft had many other interests. He was a keen golfer, swimmer and motorist, and was also interested in anatomy. He was landlord of the Angel Inn, Wisbech. He retired to Hunstanton, Norfolk with his wife Winifred. He died on 8 February 1994. He had two children, a son Terry and daughter Joyce.

== Career statistics ==
Appearances and goals by club, season and competition
Club	Season	League			FA Cup		Total	
Club	Season	Division	Apps	Goals	Apps	Goals	Apps	Goals
Rotherham United	1930–31	Division 3 North	2	1	—		2	1
Rotherham United	1931–32	Division 3 North	1	0	—		1	0
Rotherham United	Total		3	1	—		3	1
West Ham United	1932–33	Division 2	6	0	0	0	6	0
West Ham United	1933–34	Division 2	42	0	2	0	44	0
West Ham United	1934–35	Division 2	42	0	2	0	44	0
West Ham United	1935–36	Division 2	42	1	2	0	44	1
West Ham United	1936–37	Division 2	42	1	2	0	44	1
West Ham United	1937–38	Division 2	38	0	1	0	39	0
West Ham United	1938–39	Division 2	39	1	3	0	42	1
West Ham United	Total		251	3	12	0	263	3
Sheffield Wednesday	1945–46	N/A	0	0	6	0	6	0
Sheffield Wednesday	1946–47	Division 2	33	1	2	0	34	1
Sheffield Wednesday	1947–48	Division 2	41	0	2	0	43	0
Sheffield Wednesday	1948–49	Division 2	13	1	0	0	13	1
Sheffield Wednesday	Total		87	2	10	0	97	2
Sheffield United	1948–49	Division 1	12	0	2	0	14	0
Career total			353	6	24	0	377	6
