= Roy Houghton =

English footballer (1921–2017)

Personal information
- Date of birth: 31 March 1921
- Place of birth: Billingborough, Lincolnshire, England
- Date of death: 14 December 2017 (aged 96)
- Place of death: Lincolnshire, England
- Position: Outside right

Senior career*
Years	Team	Apps	(Gls)
1937–1938	Notts County	8	(0)
- Grantham
- Boston United
1949–1952	Peterborough United	55	(13)
- * Club domestic league appearances and goals

Roy Houghton (31 March 1921 – 14 December 2017) was an English footballer who played as an outside-right in the Football League for Notts County.

Houghton made eight appearances for Notts County during the 1937–38 season. After spells at Grantham and Boston United, he joined Peterborough United, where he scored 14 goals in 59 Midland League and FA Cup games.

In October 1997, it was reported that Houghton, then aged 76, lived in Stamford, Lincolnshire. He died in Lincolnshire on 14 December 2017, aged 96. His cousins Eric Houghton and Reg Goodacre, were also footballers.
