= Charlie Cox (Australian footballer) =

Australian rules footballer

Personal information
- Full name: Charles Cavendish Stewart Cox
- Born: 18 February 1873; North Melbourne, Victoria
- Died: 26 August 1947 (aged 74); Brighton, Victoria

Playing career^{1}
Years	Club	Games (Goals)
1897	St Kilda	2 (0)
- ^{1} Playing statistics correct to the end of 1897.

Charles Cavendish Stewart Cox (18 February 1873 – 26 August 1947) was an Australian rules footballer who played with St Kilda in the Victorian Football League (VFL).
