= Hughie Jacobson =

English footballer

Personal information
- Full name: Hugh Jacobson
- Date of birth: 20 February 1903
- Place of birth: Hepscott, England
- Date of death: 1974 (aged 70–71)
- Height: 5 ft 9 1/2 in (1.77 m)
- Position: Full-back

Senior career*
Years	Team	Apps	(Gls)
1923–1924	Newbiggin Athletic		
1924–1925	Blyth Spartans		
1925–1935	Grimsby Town	360	(1)
1935–1937	Doncaster Rovers	43	(0)
- * Club domestic league appearances and goals

Hugh Jacobson (20 February 1903 – 1974) was an English professional footballer who played as a full-back.
