= Susanne Puddefoot =

Susanne Puddefoot (3 October 1934 – 13 September 2010) was an English journalist, editor and charity director. She was the first editor of the Times women's page.

== Biography ==
Puddefoot was born in Blackpool to Lillian (née Frankland) and Syd Puddefoot, a football manager who had previously played professional football for West Ham United, Falkirk and Blackburn Rovers. Her father had been managing in Turkey at Galatasaray, but they moved back to England for the birth. She was educated at Blackpool Collegiate School for Girls between 1945 and 1953 and then read medieval and modern languages (French and German) at Girton College, Cambridge. There, she was assistant editor of Granta and was involved with Varsity alongside the likes of Michael Winner, Gavin Lyall and Michael Frayn.

In 1956, she worked as a reporter and feature writer for the Lancashire Evening Post, before moving into the advertising industry with Young & Rubicam, Mather & Crowther and Colman, Prentis and Varley. She was also a film critic for the Times Educational Supplement.

In 1959, she married George Perry, whom she had worked under at Granta, and who later worked on the editorial team of The Sunday Times Colour Magazine.

Appointed by Sir William Haley, she joined The Times in 1966 and was the first to edit the newly conceived Women's Page. Her tenure oversaw a 30% increase in readership for the paper and the New Statesman described the page as "currently the best thing in British journalism". Amongst her recruitments to the paper were Katie Stewart and Suzy Menkes. She left The Times in 1969, after nearly four years at the paper, and became involved with the Centre for Contemporary Cultural Studies at the University of Birmingham. In 1970, she was published in Richard Boston's journalism critique The Press We Deserve.

She suffered from bipolar disorder and worked for mental health charity Mind as a director between 1992 and 1996, and again between 2000 and 2006.

In later life, she moved to Stonehouse, Plymouth where she died, aged 75, of pneumonia.

== Awards ==
She won a Special Award at the British Press Awards in 1967.
