= Alec Hardie =

Scottish footballer

Personal information
- Full name: Alexander Hardie
- Date of birth: 15 April 1900
- Place of birth: Kilsyth, Scotland
- Date of death: 1975 (aged 74–75)
- Place of death: Glasgow, Scotland
- Position: Left half

Senior career*
Years	Team	Apps	(Gls)
1922–1925	Third Lanark	9	(0)
1923–1925	→ Solway Star (loan)	38	(3)
1925–1926	Charlton Athletic	28	(3)
1926–1933	Plymouth Argyle	232	(4)
1933–1934	Exeter City	18	(1)
–	Truro City		
- * Club domestic league appearances and goals

Alexander Hardie (15 April 1900 – 1975) was a Scottish professional footballer who made 278 appearances in the English Football League playing for Charlton Athletic, Plymouth Argyle and Exeter City. He played as a left half.

Hardie was born in Kilsyth (then in Stirlingshire) and played for Scottish Football League clubs Third Lanark (Division One) and Solway Star (Division Three) before coming to England in 1925 to play for Charlton Athletic. In 1926 he joined Plymouth Argyle. He made 241 appearances for the club in all competitions over seven seasons, the last of which came in May 1933, after which he played in the League for one more season for Exeter City, and then played local football for Truro City.
