= Wilf James =

Welsh footballer

Personal information
- Full name: Wilfred James
- Date of birth: 19 February 1907
- Place of birth: Crosskeys, Wales
- Position: Inside left

Youth career
- Cross Keys School

Senior career*
Years	Team	Apps	(Gls)
- Abercarn Welfare
- Ynysddu Crusaders
1925–1927	Newport County	20	(8)
- Thorne Colliery
1927–1928	Owston Park Rangers		
1928–1930	Notts County		
1930–1932	West Ham United	40	(7)
1932–1933	Charlton Athletic	28	(3)
1933–????	Workington		
1935–1937	Carlisle United		

International career
1931	Wales	2	(0)
- * Club domestic league appearances and goals

Wilfred James (born 19 February 1907) was a Welsh professional footballer who played for Notts County, West Ham United and Charlton Athletic, and internationally for Wales.

Born in Crosskeys, Monmouthshire, James began his football career at Cross Keys School just after the First World War. He played for local sides before joining Newport County. He joined Notts County in October 1928 and scored 6 goals in 16 appearances, before moving to London club West Ham United in May 1930. He made 40 league appearances for West Ham over two seasons, scoring seven goals. He also played in one FA Cup game for the Irons, against Chelsea on 10 January 1931. He was transferred to Charlton Athletic on 26 February 1932 for £600. He later played for Workington and Carlisle United, where he played mostly for the reserves in the North Eastern League.

James played two matches for the Wales national football team. He played his first match on 22 April 1931 against Ireland and his last match on 5 December 1931 against Ireland.

== See also ==
- List of Wales international footballers (alphabetical)
