= George Chalkley =

English footballer

Personal information
- Full name: George Alfred Arthur Chalkley
- Date of birth: 29 May 1883
- Place of birth: Plaistow, England
- Date of death: 7 January 1963 (aged 79)
- Place of death: Plaistow, England
- Height: 5 ft 10 1/2 in (1.79 m)
- Position: Defender

Senior career*
| Years | Team | Apps | (Gls) |
| –1908 | Custom House | | |
| 1908–1909 | West Ham United | 7 | (0) |
| 1909–1910 | Hastings & St Leonards United | | |
| 1910–? | Southend United | | |
- * Club domestic league appearances and goals

George Alfred Arthur Chalkley (29 May 1883 – 7 January 1963) was an English footballer who played as a centre-half for West Ham United.

Born in Plaistow, George, was the brother of West Ham full-back Alf and Dartford left-back Charlie. He played for Custom House before joining West Ham United in 1908. He played seven Southern League games for the east London club during the 1908–09 season, the first a 1–0 victory at Upton Park against Southampton on 25 December 1908 and the last a 1–0 defeat at Luton Town on 30 January 1909.

Chalkley played for Hastings & St Leonards United for the 1909–10 campaign, the club's final season before they were dissolved. The following season, he signed for Southend.
