= Arthur Stallard =

English footballer

Personal information
- Birth name: Edward Arthur James Stallard
- Date of birth: September 1892
- Place of birth: Hackney, London, England
- Date of death: 30 November 1917 (aged 25)
- Place of death: Cambrai, France
- Position: Centre forward

Senior career*
Years	Team	Apps	(Gls)
–1913	Chatham		
1913–1917	West Ham United	37	(25)
- * Club domestic league appearances and goals

Edward Arthur James Stallard (September 1892 – 30 October 1917) was an English professional footballer who played as a centre forward in the Southern Football League for West Ham United.

== Personal life ==
Stallard served as a private in the London Regiment during the First World War. He was killed in action on 30 November 1917 during the Battle of Cambrai and is commemorated on the Cambrai Memorial to the Missing.

== Career statistics ==
Appearances and goals by club, season and competition
Club	Season	Division	League		FA Cup		Total	
Club	Season	Division	Apps	Goals	Apps	Goals	Apps	Goals
West Ham United	1913–14	Southern League First Division	2	1	0	0	2	1
West Ham United	1914–15	Southern League First Division	11	7	0	0	11	7
West Ham United	1915–16	London Combination	17	11	0	0	17	11
West Ham United	1916–17	London Combination	7	6	0	0	7	6
Career total			37	25	0	0	37	25
