= Reg Wade =

English footballer

Personal information
- Full name: Reginald Thomas Wade
- Date of birth: 1907
- Place of birth: Ilford, England
- Height: 6 ft 0 in (1.83 m)
- Position: Full back

Senior career*
Years	Team	Apps	(Gls)
1924–1925	Barking Town		
1925–1926	Millwall		
1926–1929	Ilford		
1929–1932	West Ham United	32	(0)
1932–1937	Aldershot	186	(1)
- * Club domestic league appearances and goals

Reginald Thomas Wade was an English professional footballer who made over 180 appearances in the Football League for Aldershot. He also played league football for West Ham United.

== Career statistics ==
Appearances and goals by club, season and competition
Club	Season	League			FA Cup		Total	
Club	Season	Division	Apps	Goals	Apps	Goals	Apps	Goals
West Ham United	1929–30	First Division	2	0	0	0	2	0
West Ham United	1930–31	First Division	28	0	1	0	29	0
West Ham United	1931–32	First Division	2	0	0	0	2	0
Career total			32	0	1	0	33	0

== Honours ==
Ilford

- FA Amateur Cup: 1928–29
