= Jack Hebden =

English footballer

Personal information
- Date of birth: 1900
- Place of birth: Castleford, England
- Height: 5 ft 8 in (1.73 m)
- Position: Right back

Senior career*
Years	Team	Apps	(Gls)
- Castleford Town
1919–1921	Bradford City	3	(0)
1921–1928	West Ham United	110	(0)
- Fulham
Total		113	(0)
- * Club domestic league appearances and goals

Jack T. Hebden (born 1900) was an English professional footballer who played as a right back.

== Career ==
Born in Castleford, Hebden played for Castleford Town, Bradford City, West Ham United and Fulham.

For Bradford City he made 3 appearances in the Football League.
