= Len Puddefoot =

English footballer and manager

- Puddefoot at West Ham United during the 1919–20 season.

Personal information
- Full name: Leonard Frederick Puddefoot
- Date of birth: 22 November 1898
- Place of birth: Limehouse, England
- Date of death: 1996 (aged 97–98)
- Place of death: Tower Hamlets, England
- Position: Forward

Senior career*
| Years | Team | Apps | (Gls) |
| 1919–1920 | West Ham United | 0 | (0) |
| 1921–1922 | Cette | | |
| 1922 | West Ham United | 0 | (0) |
| 1922 | Falkirk | 1 | (0) |

Managerial career
- 1927–1928: Örgryte
- * Club domestic league appearances and goals

Leonard Frederick Puddefoot (22 November 1898 – 1996) was an English football player and manager.

== Career ==
=== Playing career ===
Puddefoot started his career at West Ham United and appeared in the team photograph for the 1919–20 season. He played with French club Cette in the 1921–22 season.

He joined Falkirk from West Ham United on a month's trial, following his brother Syd, who had moved across the border for a then record transfer fee of £5,000 in February 1922. Puddefoot played a single game for the Scottish club, the first game of the 1922–23 season against Hibernian on 16 August 1922.

=== Coaching career ===
Puddefoot coached Swedish side Örgryte between 1927 and 1928. The team won the Allsvenskan that season, but due to the dual-league system at the time, they were not crowned champions.
