= Charlie Cox (footballer, born 1905) =

English footballer

Personal information
- Full name: William Charles Cox
- Date of birth: 31 July 1905
- Place of birth: West Ham, England
- Date of death: 1978 (aged 72–73)
- Positions: Left back; centre half; left half

Senior career*
| Years | Team | Apps | (Gls) |
- Glico Works
- Ilford
| 1927–1931 | West Ham United | 89 | (0) |
| 1932 | Southend United | | |
- * Club domestic league appearances and goals

William Charles Cox (31 July 1905 – 1978) was a footballer who played as a left back, centre half or left half for Southend United and West Ham United in the English Football League. He also played for Glico Works and Ilford.
