= Fred Norris (footballer) =

English footballer

Personal information
- Full name: Frederick Harold Norris
- Date of birth: 14 August 1903
- Place of birth: Aston, England
- Date of death: September 1962 (aged 59)
- Position: Inside forward

Senior career*
Years	Team	Apps	(Gls)
- Adelaide
- Halesowen Town
1926–1928	Aston Villa	9	(2)
1928–1933	West Ham United	65	(6)
1933–1934	Crystal Palace	12	(4)
- * Club domestic league appearances and goals

Frederick Harold Norris (14 August 1903 — September 1962) was an English footballer who played as an inside forward.

== Career ==
Norris began his career at Birmingham Victorian League side Adelaide, later joining Halesowen Town.

In February 1926, Norris signed for Aston Villa. Norris made nine Football League appearances at Aston Villa, scoring twice. In 1928, Norris signed for West Ham United. Over the course of five seasons at the club, Norris made 65 appearances, scoring six times, all in the league. In 1933, Norris signed for Crystal Palace. Norris made twelve appearances at the club, scoring four times. Norris later emigrated to France.
