= Tommy Randall =

English footballer

Personal information
- Date of birth: 25 March 1885
- Place of birth: Barking, England
- Date of death: 17 November 1946 (aged 61)
- Place of death: Tottenham, England
- Position: Defender

Youth career
- Barking

Senior career*
Years	Team	Apps	(Gls)
1906–1915	West Ham United	189	(9)
- * Club domestic league appearances and goals

Tommy Randall (25 March 1885 – 17 November 1946) was an English footballer who played as a defender for West Ham United.

== Playing career ==
Randall was born in Barking, Essex and started his football career with Barking in the South Essex League. Starting for West Ham as an amateur and playing as an inside-forward he scored on his debut against Fulham on 27 April 1907. Fans took an immediate dislike to Randall because of his slow, methodical approach to the game and he was subjected to constant barracking and was nicknamed "Old-Mother Randall". On the verge of giving the game up he was persuaded to play at left half-back. He was such a success that he signed a full-time contract for 30 shillings a week and gained a reputation as one of the best defenders in the league. Going on to captain West Ham, Randall made 205 appearances in all competitions, scoring ten goals.

He died in 1946.
