= Jackie Morton =

English footballer

Personal information
- Full name: John Morton
- Date of birth: 26 July 1914
- Place of birth: Sheffield, England
- Date of death: 8 March 1986 (aged 71)
- Place of death: Milton Keynes, England
- Height: 5 ft 9 in (1.75 m)
- Position: Forward

Senior career*
Years	Team	Apps	(Gls)
- Gainsborough Trinity
1931–1939	West Ham United	258	(54)

International career
1937	England	1	(1)
- * Club domestic league appearances and goals

John Morton (26 July 1914 – 8 March 1986), better known as Jackie Morton, was an English professional footballer who played as a forward in the Football League for West Ham United.

Morton made 275 appearances and scored 57 goals for the East London club until 1939, having signed from Gainsborough Trinity for £600 in 1931. Along with Joe Cockroft, he was an ever-present for the club during the 1933–34 season.

Morton had previously played for Woodburn Council School and Woodhouse Alliance, and signed pro with Gainsborough aged 17.

He gained a solitary cap for England in a 5–4 victory over Czechoslovakia on 1 December 1937, in which he scored the second England goal (Stanley Matthews scored his only international hat trick in this match).
