= Reg Goodacre =

English footballer (1908–1998)

Personal information
- Full name: Reginald Goodacre
- Date of birth: 24 July 1908
- Place of birth: Billingborough, England
- Date of death: 28 September 1998 (aged 90)
- Place of death: Boston, Lincolnshire, England
- Position: Right-back

Youth career
- Sleaford G.S.
- Lincoln City

Senior career*
Years	Team	Apps	(Gls)
- Billingborough
- Boston Town
1931–1933	West Ham United	20	(0)
1933–1934	Mansfield Town	18	(1)
1934–1935	Peterborough United	35	(0)
1935	Chesterfield		
1935–?	Gainsborough Trinity		
- * Club domestic league appearances and goals

Reginald Goodacre (24 July 1908 – 28 September 1998) was an English footballer who played as a right-back in the Football League for West Ham United and Mansfield Town.

Goodacre played non-league football with Boston Town before joining West Ham United for the 1930–31 season. His first game came against Manchester United on 14 February 1931, along with fellow debutant Joe Musgrave. He spent three seasons at Upton Park, the first two in the First Division where he made 16 appearances.

In 1932–33, he made a further four appearances for West Ham in the Second Division before leaving for Mansfield Town. There, he made 18 appearances in 1933–34, scoring one goal.

He then joined Midland League club Peterborough United and made 35 appearances in 1934–35.

After a short spell at Chesterfield, where he made no competitive appearances, he joined Gainsborough Trinity.

He was a cousin of professional footballers Eric Houghton and Roy Houghton.
