= Len Goulden =

English footballer (1912–1995)

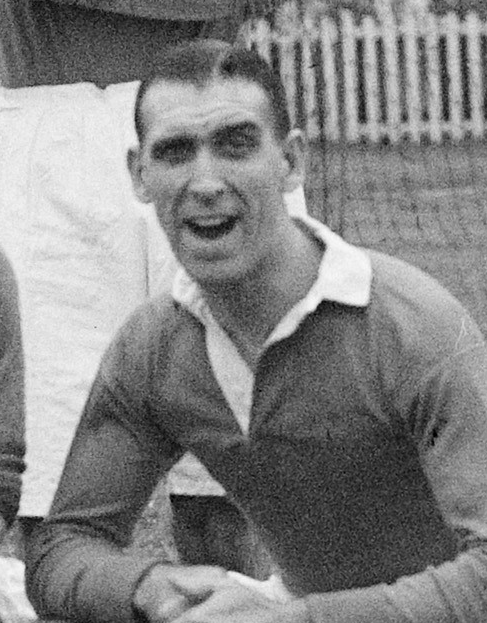
- Goulden in a Chelsea team photo, November 1947

Personal information
- Full name: Leonard Arthur Goulden
- Date of birth: 16 July 1912
- Place of birth: Homerton, London, England
- Date of death: 14 February 1995 (aged 82)
- Height: 5 ft 8 in (1.73 m)
- Position: Inside left

Senior career*
Years	Team	Apps	(Gls)
- Chelmsford City
1931–1932	Leyton		
1932–1940	West Ham United	242	(54)
1945–1950	Chelsea	99	(17)

International career
1937–1939	England	14	(4)

Managerial career
- 1952–1955: Watford
- 1965–1967: Banbury United
- * Club domestic league appearances and goals

Leonard Arthur Goulden (16 July 1912 – 14 February 1995) was an English footballer who played as an inside-left. His son Roy was also a footballer.

== Club career ==
Goulden was born at Homerton, in Hackney, London, and raised in nearby Plaistow. He signed for West Ham United as an amateur in 1931, but was sent out to Chelmsford City and Leyton to gain experience. During this time he supported himself by working at the Tate & Lyle sugar refinery in Silvertown. He signed professional forms with West Ham in 1933 and remained with the Hammers for six years, making over 250 appearances and scoring 55 goals from the inside-left position. He was an ever-present, along with Joe Cockroft, during the 1936–37 season.

His West Ham career was interrupted when World War II started and he never played another competitive match for the club, though he did win the Football League War Cup with them in 1940.

Following the conflict, he signed with west Londoners Chelsea for £4,500 and linked up well with fellow new signings Tommy Lawton and Tommy Walker – the trio scored 47 goals between them in 1946–47 – though the side failed to make to challenge for honours, coming closest in the FA Cup, when they lost to Arsenal in the semi-finals, despite having led 2–0. Goulden retired as a player in 1950, having made 111 Chelsea appearances and scored 17 goals.

== International career ==
=== Appearances and goals ===
Goulden won 14 England caps while a West Ham player, scoring four goals. He made his debut on 14 May 1937, against Norway in Oslo. England won 6–0 with Goulden scoring in the 85th minute; barging through the defence he scored with a left foot shot.

He also appeared in several wartime internationals, but these are not considered official full international matches.

=== Berlin 1938 ===
The match against Germany in Berlin in 1938 is notorious because the England team were pressured by the Foreign Office into giving the Nazi salute while the German national anthem was played. The team were furious:

The dressing room erupted. There was bedlam. All the England players were livid and totally opposed to this, myself included. Everyone was shouting at once. Eddie Hapgood, normally a respectful and devoted captain, wagged his finger at the official and told him what he could do with the Nazi salute, which involved putting it where the sun doesn't shine.

— Stanley Matthews, The Way It Was, 2000.,

However, the British ambassador, Nevile Henderson, insisted, believing that doing so would help defuse dangerously high international tensions.

There were 110,000 Germans watching the game, including Hermann Goering and Josef Goebbels, and Hitler had hoped to use the game for propaganda, in part because the German side included a player from the newly annexed Austria. Hitler was expected at the game, but it is believed that he did not attend.

Goulden, who was Jewish, and normally known for his creativity rather than his shooting ability; scored the final goal in England's 6–3 victory, a goal has been described as the East End's Jesse Owens moment and which teammate Stanley Matthews described as probably the greatest goal I ever saw.

I glanced across and saw Len Goulden steaming in just left of the centre of midfield, some 35 yards from goal. I arced around the ball in order to get some power behind the cross and picked my spot just ahead of Len. He met the ball at around knee height. My initial thought was that he'd control it and take it on to get nearer the German goal, but he didn't. Len met the ball on the run; without surrendering any pace, his left leg cocked back like the trigger of a gun, snapped forward and he met the ball full face on the volley. From 25 yards the ball screamed into the roof of the net with such power that the netting was ripped from two of the pegs by which it was tied to the crossbar. The terraces of the packed Olympic Stadium were as lifeless as a string of dead fish. "Let them salute that one," Len yelled as he carried on running, arms aloft.

— Stanley Matthews, The Way It Was, 2000.,

=== Other notable matches ===
A week after the Berlin game, England played Switzerland at Sportplatz Hardturm in Zurich. The match was started by a drop ball released from an aircraft - after circling the stadium, the aeroplane swooped over the pitch releasing the ball which landed almost exactly on the centre circle. The match finished 1–1.

On 26 October 1938, England played a Rest of Europe side managed by Vittorio Pozzo at Highbury in London, to celebrate the 75th anniversary of the Football Association. The match was the second ever to be shown on live on TV, though only the first half was shown. Goulden scored the final goal in a 3–0 victory. Sixty three years later, in 2001, FIFA retrospectively downgraded the match to unofficial, though the FA disputes this decision and continues to treat the match as official.

== Coaching and managerial career ==
Goulden remained at Chelsea until 1952, before moving to Hertfordshire in November 1952 for a management opportunity at Watford. His first match in charge was a 1–1 draw at home to Coventry, and by the end of 1952–53 Goulden had guided his team to a top-10 finish in the Third Division South. That summer he signed Dave Bewley, Roy Brown and Maurice Cook, all of whom went on to play key roles during his reign. After guiding Watford to 4th and 7th in the next two campaigns, Goulden stepped down to become a coach midway through the 1955–56 season. However, his successor and former player Johnny Paton's spell yielded just 2 wins from 15 games, including defeat at the hands of non-league clubs Aldershot and Bedford Town. Goulden took over for the remainder of the season, but was only able to salvage a 21st-placed finish.

After three years coaching overseas, Goulden returned to Watford in 1959, as part of new manager Ron Burgess's coaching staff. Burgess and Goulden's impact was immediate; Watford won promotion from the Fourth Division in 1960, and very nearly a second consecutive promotion in 1961. Goulden departed the following season, again coaching overseas, before returning to management in England with Banbury United in 1965. Goulden, assisted by his former player Maurice Cook, helped Banbury reach the Southern League for the first time in their history. After leaving in 1967, Goulden's final role in football came at Oxford United, where he managed the reserve team from 1969.

Goulden died on 14 February 1995, in Plaistow, London.
