= Syd Puddefoot =

English footballer (1894–1972)

- Puddefoot as a West Ham United player

Personal information
- Full name: Sydney Charles Puddefoot
- Date of birth: 17 October 1894
- Place of birth: Limehouse, England
- Date of death: 2 October 1972 (aged 77)
- Place of death: Essex, England (Note: England Football Online lists the place of death as 22 Bewley Court, Southend-on-Sea, and registered in Rochford, December 1972. War Hammers (Belton, 2014) puts the place of death at Rochford Hospital.)
- Height: 5 ft 10 1/2 in (1.79 m)
- Position: Forward

Youth career
- Condor Athletic
- –1912: Limehouse Town
- 1912–1913: West Ham United

Senior career*
Years	Team	Apps	(Gls)
1913–1922	West Ham United	158	(102)
1922–1925	Falkirk	113	(45)
1925–1932	Blackburn Rovers	250	(79)
1932–1933	West Ham United	22	(3)
Total		543	(229)

International career
1925–1926	England	2	(0)
- 1933–1934: Galatasaray
- 1935–1937: Northampton Town
- Cricket career
Cricket information
- Batting: Right-handed
- Bowling: Left arm medium
Domestic team information
- Years: Team
- 1922–1923: Essex
Career statistics
Competition	FC
Matches	8
Runs scored	101
Batting average	16.83
100s/50s	0/0
Top score	42
Balls bowled	198
Wickets	1
Bowling average	105
5 wickets in innings	0
10 wickets in match	0
Best bowling	1/34
Catches/stumpings	2/–
- Source: Cricinfo, 16 February 2011
- * Club domestic league appearances and goals

Sydney Charles Puddefoot (17 October 1894 – 2 October 1972) was an English footballer who played for West Ham United, Falkirk and Blackburn Rovers. He played mainly as a centre forward or inside right. He was also a cricketer for Essex. He went on to manage Galatasaray and Northampton Town.

== Club career ==
=== Early years and West Ham United ===
Puddefoot was born in Limehouse in the East End of London. He was a pupil at Park School in West Ham and played junior football with Condor Athletic and Limehouse Town before joining West Ham United as an amateur in June 1912. He then signed on as a professional in February 1913. Under the tutelage of coach and future manager Charlie Paynter, he quickly developed into a formidable force and scored 28 goals in 55 Southern League appearances for the club. He broke the club record for most individual goals scored in an FA Cup match, landing five (including a hat-trick in seven minutes) in an 8–1 mauling of Chesterfield in a first-round game on 10 January 1914. The record remains to this day and is also West Ham's biggest victory in the competition.

=== Wartime ===
Puddefoot worked at a munitions factory for most of World War I and was not called up for service until late on in the conflict. He made 126 appearances in the wartime London Combination and scored 100 goals, including seven against Crystal Palace in April 1918 (a record for the competition). On 8 September 1917, he played against QPR in their first game at Loftus Road, scoring a hat-trick.

During his service, he was stationed at Bridge of Allan in Stirlingshire and guested for Falkirk during his time in Scotland.

=== After the war and Falkirk ===
After the end of the war, Puddefoot played in the newly enlarged Football League Division Two for the 1919–20 season. He scored 21 goals for West Ham that season, and was selected to play for England in three Victory International games (he scored in all three). He then scored 29 goals in the 1920–21 season and 14 in 1921–22.

When will this folly on the part of football clubs come to an end? — The Football Post, on Puddefoot's transfer to Falkirk.

Puddefoot's exploits made him much sought after and Falkirk, who had witnessed the player first-hand, won the battle for his transfer on 7 February 1922. The fee of £5,000 was a world football transfer record, and represented the only time a Scottish team has broken the record. So eager were the Falkirk supporters to land their man that they themselves set up a public fund to raise money for the purchase. Puddefoot himself earned a £1000 signing-on fee. His younger brother Len followed him to Falkirk at the start of the following season for a month's trial, but only made a single appearance. (Note: Sources including Who's Who of West Ham United (Hogg, 2005) state that the move was part of the same deal.)

The record would last less than a month, however, as Warney Cresswell was transferred from South Shields to Sunderland for £5,500 on 3 March 1922.

Puddefoot spent three seasons at Brockville Park, scoring 45 goals in 113 league appearances.

=== Blackburn Rovers ===
Puddefoot joined Blackburn Rovers on 3 February 1925 for £4,000, making his debut at home to Arsenal on 7 February 1925. He won the FA Cup with Blackburn in 1928, starring in the 3-1 win over favourites Huddersfield Town.

In 1929, Puddefoot was among the first to take advantage of the new FA rule that allowed for personal hearings for disciplinary matters, after his sending off against Bolton Wanderers.

He left Blackburn, having scored 87 goals in 267 appearances in all competitions.

=== Return to West Ham United ===
On 26 February 1932, ten years after leaving his boyhood club, and at the age of 37, Syd returned to east London to help with the ultimately doomed effort to avoid relegation in the 1931–32 season. He made seven appearances that season without return, and managed three goals in 15 appearances the following season. He played his 192nd and final game for West Ham on 6 March 1933, scoring the last of his 107 goals for the club.

== International career ==
Puddefoot's three Victory International games did not count as official appearances. He did, however, gain official caps when he played twice for England in the British Home Championship, once in 1925 and once in 1926.

== Cricket career ==
Puddefoot played cricket for Essex. He appeared in eight first-class matches in 1922 and 1923, travelling back to Essex during summers while he was with Falkirk.

== Coaching career ==
After the end of his playing career, Puddefoot travelled to Turkey to manage Istanbul side Galatasaray for the 1933–34 season.

In February 1934, he was involved in an incident in which he was manhandled while trying to calm down players during a game. Play had to be suspended and police were called in when the crowd invaded the pitch. As a result, 17 of the 22 players who were involved in the match were suspended by the Turkish Football Association.

Puddefoot returned to England in 1934 for the birth of his child. He worked as an FA instructor to Kent Secondary Schoolboys, replacing Wally Hardinge in the role in 1935, but left to take on the managers role at Northampton Town. He joined the East Midlands club on 8 March 1935 and stayed for two years, resigning on 10 March 1937 after a disagreement over club policy. He left the club having won 41 of his 94 games in charge.

During World War II, he worked as a War Reserve Constable for the Blackpool Borough Police and went on to become a civil servant with the Ministry of Pensions. He later worked for Southend United.

== Personal life ==
He died in October 1972 after a three-week battle against pneumonia, just before what would have been his 78th birthday. He was survived by his wife, Lillian (née Frankland), and daughter, Susanne Puddefoot (1934–2010), a journalist who edited the Times Women's Page in the 1960s.

== Career statistics ==
#	Date	Venue	Opponent	Result	Competition	Scored
1	26 April 1919	Goodison Park	Scotland	2–2	Victory International	1
2	3 May 1919	Hampden Park	Scotland	3–4	Victory International	2
3	11 October 1919	Ninian Park	Wales	2–1	Victory International	1
4	24 October 1925	Windsor Park	Northern Ireland	0–0	British Home Championship	0
5	17 April 1926	Old Trafford	Scotland	0–1	British Home Championship	0

== Managerial statistics ==
Club	From	To	P	W	D	L	Win% (Note: Win% is rounded to two decimal places)	Honours	Notes
Galatasaray	Jan 1933	Sep 1934	31	16	7	8	51.61	Istanbul Kupası	
Northampton Town	Mar 1935	Mar 1937	98	43	16	39	43.88		

== Honours ==
Blackburn Rovers

- FA Cup: 1927–28
