= Tommy Yews =

English footballer

Personal information
- Full name: Thomas Peace Yews
- Date of birth: 28 February 1902
- Place of birth: Wingate, County Durham, England
- Date of death: August 1966 (aged 64)
- Position: Winger

Senior career*
Years	Team	Apps	(Gls)
- NER Durham
1920–1923	Hartlepool United	48	(3)
1923–1933	West Ham United	332	(46)
1933	Clapton Orient	3	
- * Club domestic league appearances and goals

Thomas Peace Yews (28 February 1902 – August 1966) was an English footballer, playing as a winger.

Yews was born in Wingate, County Durham and played for NER Durham before joining Hartlepool United in 1920.

Yews joined West Ham United for a fee of £150 in 1923 and played in the high-scoring Hammers team that included Vic Watson, and Jimmy Ruffell on the opposite wing. He made a total of 361 appearances for the Upton Park club, scoring 51 goals.

He left West Ham in 1933 and played three League games for Clapton Orient before retiring.
