= Herbert Lyon =

English footballer

Personal information
- Full name: Herbert Ernest Saxon Bertie Cordey Lyon
- Date of birth: 18 May 1875
- Place of birth: Mosborough, England
- Date of death: 1927 (aged 51–52)
- Height: 5 ft 7 in (1.70 m)
- Position: Inside forward

Senior career*
Years	Team	Apps	(Gls)
1895–1896	Overseal Town		
1896–1899	Gresley Rovers		
1899–1900	Leicester Fosse	14	(4)
1900–1901	Nelson		
1901–1902	Watford	30	(12)
1902–1903	Reading		
1903–1904	West Ham United	29	(4)
1904–1905	Brighton & Hove Albion	29	(5)
1905–1906	Swindon Town	34	(5)
1906–1907	Carlisle United		
1907–1908	Swindon Town	13	(1)
1908–1909	Blackpool	8	(2)
1909–19??	Walsall		
–	Tredegar		
- * Club domestic league appearances and goals

Herbert Ernest Saxon Bertie Cordey Lyon (18 May 1875 – 1927), known as Bertie or Bert Lyon, was an English footballer. Although predominantly an inside forward or centre forward, Mosborough-born Lyon played in most positions throughout his career. He never stayed at the same club for more than two consecutive seasons; during his career he played for Overseal Town, Gresley Rovers, Leicester Fosse, Nelson, Watford, Reading, West Ham United, Brighton & Hove Albion, Swindon Town, Carlisle United, Blackpool, Walsall and Tredegar.

Lyon joined Leicester Fosse from Gresley Rovers in January 1899. He was once selected to play a Football League First Division match as a goalkeeper, against Bolton Wanderers in March 1900, and kept a clean sheet in a goalless draw.

After a season at Nelson, of the Lancashire League, Lyon moved south to Hertfordshire, to play for Southern League First Division side Watford. He finished the 1901–02 season as the club's leading scorer, with 14 goals from 32 appearances; however, he departed at the end of the season. Indeed, between 1901 and 1909, he spent precisely one season at a club before moving on; namely Watford (1901–02), Reading (1902–03), West Ham (1903–04), Brighton & Hove Albion (1904–05), Swindon Town (1905–06 and 1907–08), Carlisle United (1906–07) and Blackpool (1908–1909).
