= Joe Musgrave =

English footballer (1908-1981)

Personal information
- Full name: Joseph William Musgrave
- Date of birth: 29 February 1908
- Place of birth: Sedgefield, England
- Date of death: 1981 (aged 72–73)
- Height: 5 ft 9 in (1.75 m)
- Positions: Left-half; inside left

Senior career*
Years	Team	Apps	(Gls)
- Willington
- Spennymoor United
1930–1936	West Ham United	36	(1)
1936–1938	Swindon Town	23	(3)
1938–1939	Hartlepools United	20	(3)
- Spennymoor United
- * Club domestic league appearances and goals

Joseph William Musgrave (29 February 1908 – 1981) was an English footballer who played as a left-half or inside-left in the Football League for West Ham United, Swindon Town and Hartlepools United.

Musgrave played non-league football with Willington and Spennymoor United before joining West Ham United in 1931. His first game came against Manchester United on 14 February, along with fellow debutant Reg Goodacre. He scored his first and only League goal for the club in a 3–2 win over Blackpool on 11 April 1931, and ended his debut season with seven First Division appearances.

Musgrave played mainly for the reserve team and managed just three League appearances in 1931–32. The following season, after the Hammers had been relegated to the Second Division, he made 23. He also made four appearances in the FA Cup and scored his only other goal for the club in a fifth-round tie against Brighton and Hove Albion on 18 February 1933. The following three seasons saw Musgrave make a further three appearances and he did not play any first-team football in 1934–35.

After seven seasons at Upton Park, he had made a total of 40 league and cup appearances for the club, scoring two goals. His last game came on 25 January 1936, a 2–0 win over Doncaster Rovers and he left the club for Swindon Town two days later.

Mugrave's two-season tenure at Swindon Town saw three goals in 23 Third Division South games, and a single FA Cup appearance. He went on to join Hartlepools United in 1938, where he matched that goal tally in 20 Third Division North appearances in 1931–32. A further appearance came in the Third Division North Cup against Darlington. After a single season at Pools, he returned to Spennymoor United.

== Career statistics ==
Club	Season	League			FA Cup		Other		Total	
Club	Season	Division	Apps	Goals	Apps	Goals	Apps	Goals	Apps	Goals
West Ham United	1930-31	First Division	7	1	0	0	—		7	1
West Ham United	1931-32	First Division	3	0	0	0	—		3	0
West Ham United	1932-33	Second Division	23	0	4	1	—		27	1
West Ham United	1933-34	Second Division	1	0	0	0	—		1	0
West Ham United	1934-35	Second Division	0	0	0	0	—		0	0
West Ham United	1935-36	Second Division	2	0	0	0	—		2	0
West Ham United	Total		36	1	4	1	—		40	2
Swindon Town	1936–37	Third Division South	17	2	0	0	—		17	2
Swindon Town	1937-38	Third Division South	6	1	1	0	—		7	1
Swindon Town	Total		23	3	1	0	—		24	3
Hartlepools United	1938–39	Third Division North	20	3	0	0	1 (Note: Appearance in the Third Division North Cup)	0	21	3
Career total			79	7	5	1	1	0	85	8
