= Alf Earl =

English footballer

Personal information
- Date of birth: 19 March 1903
- Place of birth: Earlsfield, England
- Date of death: 17 August 1951 (aged 48)
- Place of death: Carshalton, England
- Position: Full back

Senior career*
Years	Team	Apps	(Gls)
–1925	Summerstown		
1925–1933	West Ham United	191	(0)
1933–	Streatham Town		
- Souchaux
- * Club domestic league appearances and goals

Alfred Earl (19 March 1903 – 17 August 1951) was an English footballer who played as a right-back.

Earl was born in Earlsfield, London and joined West Ham United from Summerstown in 1925, and made a total of 191 League appearances for the east London club between 1925 and 1933. He went on to play for Streatham Town and later for French team Souchaux. He died in Carshalton on 17 August 1951.
