= Ernie Watts (footballer, born 1872) =

English footballer

Personal information
- Full name: Ernest Arthur Watts
- Date of birth: 11 April 1872
- Place of birth: Woolhampton, England
- Date of death: 1956
- Positions: Right half; goalkeeper

Senior career*
Years	Team	Apps	(Gls)
- Reading
1898	Notts County	17	(0)
- Reading
1903–1904	West Ham United	25	(1)
1904–1905	New Brompton	30	(0)
- Grays Athletic
- Reading
1906	Clapton Orient	2	(0)
- Reading
- * Club domestic league appearances and goals

Ernest Arthur Watts (11 April 1872 – 1956) was an English footballer of the late 19th and early 20th centuries.

Born in Woolhampton in Berkshire, his earliest known club was Reading, before he moved to Notts County, where he made 17 appearances in The Football League. He had a second spell with Reading and also played for West Ham United, where he was captain for the club's final season at the Memorial Grounds, before joining New Brompton in 1904, where he was a regular starter during the 1904–05 season. His later clubs included Grays Athletic and Clapton Orient, as well as two more spells with Reading.

Watts was a soldier and played for the Royal Berkshire Regiment Cricket XI, as well as playing minor counties cricket for Berkshire from 1896 to 1908, making 85 appearances in the Minor Counties Championship.
