= Alfred Chalkley =

English footballer

Personal information
- Full name: Alfred George Chalkley
- Date of birth: 16 August 1904
- Place of birth: Plaistow, Essex, England
- Date of death: 11 June 1971 (aged 66)
- Place of death: Tasburgh, Norfolk
- Position: Full-back

Senior career*
Years	Team	Apps	(Gls)
1931–1937	West Ham United	188	(1)

International career
1917	England Boys	1	(0)
- * Club domestic league appearances and goals

Alfred George Chalkley (16 August 1904 – 11 June 1971) was an English footballer who played as a full-back for West Ham United.

Chalkley, brother of West Ham centre-half George and Dartford left-back Charlie, was born in Plaistow. He played schoolboy football as an outside-left, and was capped for England Boys against Scotland in 1917, although he served with the Army during World War I and later became a steel erector.

Chalkley signed professional forms with West Ham in 1931 after impressing in a trial game and played 29 games of the 1931–32 season. His Division One debut came in the first game of the season, a 1–0 away loss against Bolton Wanderers on 29 August 1931, in front of 15,740 people. Two days later, he experienced a home crowd of 28,338, and a 3–1 win against Chelsea. His only goal came against Manchester City on 2 March 1932, a clearance from his own penalty area that somehow managed to clear City 'keeper Len Langford.

He went on to make 202 League and FA Cup appearances for the Irons, and was an ever-present during the 1934–35 season. Chalkley's final appearance for the West Ham first team was against Fulham on 7 November 1936. After that, he featured regularly for the London Combination side up until January 1944.

During World War II, he made 34 appearances in the Football League South, 18 in the London League, 2 in the League South Cup, 11 in the London War Cup and 5 in the Football League War Cup.

Chalkley represented the London FA in a game against Diables Rouges of Belgium, and also played for the London Combination three times.

He retired from football after leaving West Ham.
