= Albert Cadwell =

English footballer

Personal information
- Full name: Albert Frank Cadwell
- Date of birth: 1 November 1900
- Place of birth: London, England
- Date of death: 13 July 1944 (aged 43)
- Place of death: Cambridge, England
- Position: Left-half

Senior career*
Years	Team	Apps	(Gls)
1922–1923	Nunhead		
1923–1933	West Ham United	272	(1)
- * Club domestic league appearances and goals

Albert Cadwell (1 November 1900 – 13 July 1944) was an English footballer who played for West Ham United as a left-half.

Cadwell was born in Edmonton, London, and joined West Ham from Nunhead during the 1923–24 season, the east London club's first season in Division One.

He played his first game for West Ham against Chelsea on 20 October 1923. Succeeding Jack Tresadern as first choice left-half, he made 297 league and cup appearances for the club between 1923 and 1933. His last game was against Charlton Athletic on 8 April 1933.

Cadwell represented the Football League in a game against the Irish League in 1930, and also played for London and Surrey.
