= Charlie Paynter =

English footballer and manager

Personal information
- Full name: Charles Paynter
- Date of birth: 28 July 1879
- Place of birth: Swindon, England
- Date of death: 1 December 1970 (aged 91)
- Place of death: England

Senior career*
Years	Team	Apps	(Gls)
- Victoria Swifts
- South West Ham
1901–1902	West Ham United	0	(0)

Managerial career
- 1932–1950: West Ham United
- * Club domestic league appearances and goals

Charlie Paynter (28 July 1879 in Swindon – 1 December 1971) was the manager of West Ham United from 1932 to 1950.

He moved to Plaistow with his family as a child. He played for the local teams Victoria Swifts and South West Ham, but while still a teenager he also developed an interest in physiotherapy. Paynter first became involved with West Ham United in 1897 as unpaid help. In the 1900–01 season Paynter joined the club as a player although he never played for the first-team. He sustained a knee injury in a match against Woolwich Arsenal which ended his career and the club appointed him reserve-team trainer in 1902. He was then promoted to first-team trainer, replacing Syd King, who was appointed first team manager.

When King was sacked in 1933, Paynter replaced him. At the time of his appointment the club were near the foot of the Second Division table and in serious danger of a second successive relegation, which was avoided by just one point at the end of the season, with the club finishing 20th, which remains their lowest-ever finish in the league. Their form improved over the seasons that followed, resulting in them finishing third in 1934-35 and only missing out on promotion due to goal average, and finishing fourth the following year. The team's form tailed off in the years ahead, though they still generally finished safely in mid-table. However, his final season in charge, 1949-50 saw another relegation struggle, after which Paynter decided to retire and allow his assistant manager, Ted Fenton to take over.

== Managerial statistics ==
Team	Nat	From	To	Record				
Team	Nat	From	To	G	W	L	D	Win %
West Ham United	(England)	1 November 1932	1 August 1950	480	198	166	116	41.25
