= Jim Barrett Sr. =

English footballer (1907–1970)

Jim Barrett

Personal information
- Full name: James William Barrett
- Date of birth: 19 January 1907
- Place of birth: Stratford, England
- Date of death: 25 November 1970 (aged 63)
- Place of death: Southwark, England
- Height: 5 ft 11 1/2 in (1.82 m)
- Position: Central defender

Youth career
- Fairbairn House
- West Ham United

Senior career*
Years	Team	Apps	(Gls)
1923–1939	West Ham United	442	(49)

International career
1928	England	1	(0)
- * Club domestic league appearances and goals

James William Barrett (19 January 1907 – 25 November 1970) was an English footballer who played for West Ham United.

Born in Stratford, London, Barrett began playing football at the city's Park School, after moving from Abbey School because it lacked a team. He played at Park with Billy "Bubbles" Murray, who is linked with the history of West Ham's anthem "I'm Forever Blowing Bubbles".

He played his first game at Upton Park for West Ham Boys against Liverpool in the English Shield Final of 1920–21.

He signed professional forms with the east London club in 1923 at the age of 16, but didn't play his first senior game until 28 March 1925, against Spurs at White Hart Lane. He was an ever-present during the 1925–26 and 1926–27 seasons, and was also the club's top appearance maker for the 1930–31 and 1932–33 seasons. He went on to make a total of 467 appearances for West Ham, scoring 53 goals.

Barrett's only international appearance came against Northern Ireland in 1928, where he lasted four minutes before succumbing to injury making his appearance the shortest ever international career.

Big Jim's son, James Guy Barrett, also played for West Ham, and he had the opportunity of playing with Jim Jr. while in charge of the A team in 1945–46.

== See also ==
- One-club man
