= 2025–26 National League =

The 2025–26 National League season, known as the Enterprise National League for sponsorship reasons, is the 11th season under the title of the National League, the 22nd season consisting of three divisions, and the 47th season overall.

Enterprise Rent-A-Car were confirmed as the new sponsors for the National League on 23 June 2025 after agreeing a multi-year deal, replacing Vanarama.

Locations of the 2025–26 National League (Red) and Division North (Blue) and South (Green) clubs

== National League ==
National League
- Season: 2025–26
- Champions: York City
- Promoted: York City; Rochdale
- Relegated: Brackley Town; Morecambe; Braintree Town; Truro City
- Matches: 552
- Goals: 1,610 (2.92 per match)
- Top goalscorer: (England) Ollie Pearce (31 goals)
- Biggest home win: Wealdstone 7–0 Hartlepool United (31 March 2026)
- Biggest away win: Sutton United 0–5 Morecambe (7 March 2026)
- Highest scoring: Scunthorpe United 3–6 Boston United (14 February 2026)
- Longest winning run: York City (9 games)
- Longest unbeaten run: York City (24 games)
- Longest winless run: Gateshead (16 games)
- Longest losing run: Gateshead (13 games)
- Highest attendance: 10,860; Carlisle United 1–1 Eastleigh (15 November 2025)
- Lowest attendance: 413; Gateshead 1–0 Braintree Town (4 March 2026)
- Total attendance: 1,482,316
- All statistics correct as of 24 March 2026.

Twenty-four teams compete in the league – eighteen returning teams from the previous season, two teams relegated from EFL League Two, two teams promoted from the National League North and two teams promoted from the National League South.

Morecambe were suspended in July 2025 after the club failed to reach a deadline on their finances to the league, with their opening fixtures in the competition postponed. The club's suspension was lifted three weeks later after the club was taken over by the Panjab Warriors consortium, allowing them to take part. On the final match day the top 2 teams Rochdale and York City played each other in a game where the winner won the National League. In that game Rochdale scored in the 96th minute, only for York City to equalize in the 106th.

=== Team changes ===
To National League

Promoted from National League North

- Brackley Town
- Scunthorpe United

Promoted from National League South

- Truro City
- Boreham Wood

Relegated from League Two

- Carlisle United
- Morecambe

From National League

Promoted to League Two

- Barnet
- Oldham Athletic

Relegated to National League North

- AFC Fylde

Relegated to National League South

- Dagenham & Redbridge
- Maidenhead United
- Ebbsfleet United

=== Stadiums and locations ===
Locations of the 2025–26 National League clubs

Team	Location	Stadium	Capacity
Aldershot Town	Aldershot	The Recreation Ground	7,100
Altrincham	Altrincham	Moss Lane	7,700
Boreham Wood	Borehamwood	Meadow Park	4,502
Boston United	Boston	Boston Community Stadium	5,061
Brackley Town	Brackley	St. James Park	3,500
Braintree Town	Braintree	Cressing Road	4,222
Carlisle United	Carlisle	Brunton Park	17,949
Eastleigh	Eastleigh	Ten Acres	5,250
FC Halifax Town	Halifax	The Shay	10,400
Forest Green Rovers	Nailsworth	The New Lawn	5,147
Gateshead	Gateshead	Gateshead International Stadium	11,800
Hartlepool United	Hartlepool	Victoria Park	7,856
Morecambe	Morecambe	Mazuma Mobile Stadium	6,476
Rochdale	Rochdale	Spotland Stadium	10,249
Scunthorpe United	Scunthorpe	Glanford Park	9,088
Solihull Moors	Solihull	Damson Park	5,500
Southend United	Southend-on-Sea	Roots Hall	12,392
Sutton United	London (Sutton)	Gander Green Lane	5,013
Tamworth	Tamworth	The Lamb Ground	4,565
Truro City	Truro	Truro City Stadium	3,600
Wealdstone	London (Ruislip)	Grosvenor Vale	4,085
Woking	Woking	Kingfield Stadium	6,036
Yeovil Town	Yeovil	Huish Park	9,566
York City	York	York Community Stadium	8,500

=== Personnel and sponsoring ===
Team	Manager	Captain	Kit manufacturer	Shirt sponsor (front)
Aldershot Town	(England) John Coleman	(England) Theo Widdrington	Erreà	Bridges Estate Agents
Altrincham	(Wales) Neil Gibson	(England) Lewis Baines	Puma	AO World
Boreham Wood	(England) Luke Garrard	(England) Jack Payne	Puma	Mangata Developments
Boston United	(England) Paul Hurst	Rotate in	Umbro	Kia
Brackley Town	(England) Andy Whing	(England) Gareth Dean	Puma	Going Plural
Braintree Town	(England) Steve Pitt	(England) George Langston	Andreas Carter Sports	Andreas Carter Sports
Carlisle United	(Wales) Mark Hughes	(England) Charlie Wyke	Umbro	Aqua Pura
Eastleigh	(England) Richard Hill (interim)	(Jamaica) Jordan Cousins	Erreà	Utilita
FC Halifax Town	(England) Adam Lakeland	(England) Sam Johnson	Adidas	Nuie
Forest Green Rovers	(Wales) Robbie Savage	(England) Jordan Moore-Taylor	Reflo	Ecotricity
Gateshead	(Republic of Ireland) Rob Elliot	(England) Kenton Richardson	Patrick	Gateshead Central
Hartlepool United	(England) Nicky Featherstone	(England) Tom Parkes	Meyba	Utilita
Morecambe	(England) Jim Bentley	(Cameroon) Yann Songo'o	Terrace	LBD Modular Systems Ltd
Rochdale	(Scotland) Jimmy McNulty	(England) Ethan Ebanks-Landell	O'Neills	Crown Oil Ltd
Scunthorpe United	(England) Andy Butler	(England) Andrew Boyce	Meyba	HITEK Electronic Materials Limited
Solihull Moors	(England) Chris Millington	(England) Alex Whitmore	Macron	Taxbuddi
Southend United	(Republic of Ireland) Kevin Maher	(England) Nathan Ralph	Macron	c2c
Sutton United	(England) Chris Agutter	Rotate in	O'Neills	Echo Laser BPH therapy
Tamworth	(England) Andy Peaks	(England) Ben Milnes	Macron	Bradley Scott Windows
Truro City	(England) John Askey	(England) Connor Riley-Lowe	Kappa	Jacuzzi
Wealdstone	(Republic of Ireland) Gary Waddock	(England) Jack Cook	Kelme	Brunel University London
Woking	(England) Jermain Defoe	(Northern Ireland) Dale Gorman	Erreà	Nuffield Health
Yeovil Town	(England) Billy Rowley	(England) Jake Wannell	Erreà	Bradfords Buildings Supplies
York City	(England) Stuart Maynard	(England) Callum Howe	Hummel	Titan Wealth

=== Managerial changes ===
Team	Outgoing manager	Manner of departure	Date of vacancy	Position in table	Incoming manager	Date of appointment
Wealdstone	(Wales) Neil Gibson	Mutual consent	26 May 2025	Pre-season	(Guyana) Sam Cox	5 June 2025
FC Halifax Town	(England) Chris Millington	Resigned	27 May 2025	Pre-season	(England) Adam Lakeland	14 June 2025
Gateshead	(Northern Ireland) Carl Magnay	Resigned	2 June 2025	Pre-season	(England) Alun Armstrong	16 June 2025
Hartlepool United	(Australia) Anthony Limbrick	Sacked	12 June 2025	Pre-season	(England) Simon Grayson	12 June 2025
Forest Green Rovers	(England) Steve Cotterill	Sacked	26 June 2025	Pre-season	(Wales) Robbie Savage	1 July 2025
Morecambe	(Scotland) Derek Adams	Sacked	18 August 2025	18th	(England) Ashvir Singh Johal	19 August 2025
Yeovil Town	(England) Mark Cooper	Sacked	26 August 2025	18th	(England) Danny Webb	12 September 2025
York City	(England) Adam Hinshelwood	Sacked	28 August 2025	12th	(England) Stuart Maynard	28 August 2025
Solihull Moors	(England) Matt Taylor	Sacked	3 September 2025	24th	(England) Chris Millington	1 October 2025
Sutton United	(Wales) Steve Morison	Sacked	17 September 2025	22nd	(England) Chris Agutter	2 October 2025
Eastleigh	(England) Kelvin Davis	Sacked	20 September 2025	16th	(England) Scott Bartlett	24 September 2025
Yeovil Town	(England) Danny Webb	Resigned	22 September 2025	17th	(England) Richard Dryden (interim)	22 September 2025
Hartlepool United	(England) Simon Grayson	Sacked	12 October 2025	12th	(England) Nicky Featherstone (Note: Featherstone was initially appointed caretaker manager before being appointed permanently on 5 December 2025)	12 October 2025
Aldershot Town	(England) Tommy Widdrington	Resigned	14 October 2025	19th	(England) John Coleman	24 October 2025
Altrincham	(England) Phil Parkinson	Sacked	23 October 2025	20th	(Wales) Neil Gibson (Note: Gibson was originally appointed interim manager before being appointed permanently on 25 November 2025.)	24 October 2025
Yeovil Town	(England) Richard Dryden	End of interim spell	25 November 2025	17th	(England) Billy Rowley	25 November 2025
Gateshead	(England) Alun Armstrong	Club restructuring	2 January 2026	24th	(Republic of Ireland) Rob Elliot	2 January 2026
Boston United	(Republic of Ireland) Graham Coughlan	Sacked	11 January 2026	17th	(England) Paul Hurst	14 January 2026
Brackley Town	(England) Gavin Cowan	Signed by Shrewsbury Town	29 January 2026	15th	(England) Andy Whing	17 February 2026
Morecambe	(England) Ashvir Singh Johal	Mutual consent	30 January 2026	23rd	(England) Jim Bentley	1 February 2026
Eastleigh	(England) Scott Bartlett	Sacked	21 February 2026	18th	(England) Richard Hill (interim)	24 February 2026
Wealdstone	(Guyana) Sam Cox	Sacked	22 February 2026	17th	(Republic of Ireland) Gary Waddock	27 February 2026
Woking	(England) Neal Ardley	Sacked	1 March 2026	17th	(England) Jermain Defoe	29 March 2026

=== Table ===
Pos	Team	Pld	W	D	L	GF	GA	GD	Pts	Promotion, qualification or relegation
1	York City (C, P)	46	33	9	4	114	41	+73	108	Promotion to EFL League Two
2	Rochdale (O, P)	46	33	7	6	88	41	+47	106	Qualification for National League play-off semi-finals
3	Carlisle United	46	29	8	9	87	51	+36	95	Qualification for National League play-off semi-finals
4	Boreham Wood	46	27	9	10	95	58	+37	90	Qualification for the National League play-off quarter-finals
5	Scunthorpe United	46	23	13	10	77	62	+15	82	Qualification for the National League play-off quarter-finals
6	Southend United	46	23	12	11	83	47	+36	81	Qualification for the National League play-off quarter-finals
7	Forest Green Rovers	46	23	12	11	82	52	+30	81	Qualification for the National League play-off quarter-finals
8	FC Halifax Town	46	20	10	16	69	66	+3	70	
9	Hartlepool United	46	18	14	14	54	59	−5	68	
10	Woking	46	16	15	15	69	54	+15	63	
11	Tamworth	46	17	11	18	63	71	−8	62	
12	Boston United	46	15	14	17	63	67	−4	59	
13	Altrincham	46	17	6	23	55	65	−10	57	
14	Solihull Moors	46	14	14	18	71	72	−1	56	
15	Wealdstone	46	15	11	20	67	74	−7	56	
16	Yeovil Town	46	15	6	25	48	68	−20	51	
17	Eastleigh	46	13	11	22	57	80	−23	50	
18	Gateshead	46	14	8	24	54	90	−36	50	
19	Sutton United	46	11	14	21	59	79	−20	47	
20	Aldershot Town	46	13	7	26	69	87	−18	46	
21	Brackley Town (R)	46	10	12	24	40	75	−35	42	Relegation to National League North
22	Morecambe (R)	46	9	11	26	66	103	−37	38	Relegation to National League North
23	Braintree Town (R)	46	8	12	26	38	76	−38	36	Relegation to National League South
24	Truro City (R)	46	8	10	28	42	72	−30	34	Relegation to National League South

Source: National League official site
Rules for classification: 1) Points; 2) Goal difference; 3) Number of goals scored; 4) Number of matches won; 5) Head-to-head results
(C) Champions; (O) Play-off winners; (P) Promoted; (R) Relegated

=== Play-offs ===
Quarter-finals
5	Scunthorpe United	1
6	Southend United	0
4	Boreham Wood (a.e.t.)	1
7	Forest Green Rovers	0

Semi-finals
2	Rochdale	2
5	Scunthorpe United	1
3	Carlisle United	1
4	Boreham Wood (a.e.t.)	2

Final
2	Rochdale (p)	2 (3)
4	Boreham Wood	2 (1)

==== Quarter-finals ====
28 April 2026	Scunthorpe United	1–0	Southend United	Scunthorpe
19:45 BST	Roberts 5'			Stadium: Glanford Park; Attendance: 6,248

29 April 2026	Boreham Wood	1–0 (a.e.t.)	Forest Green Rovers	Borehamwood
19:45 BST	Brunt 105+3'			Stadium: Meadow Park; Attendance: 2,452

==== Semi-finals ====
3 May 2026	Carlisle United	1–2 (a.e.t.)	Boreham Wood	Carlisle
12:30 BST	Feeney 40'		Abdulmalik 28'; Brunt 106'	Stadium: Brunton Park; Attendance: 13,814

3 May 2026	Rochdale	2–1	Scunthorpe United	Rochdale
15:00 BST	Evans 3' (o.g.); Rodney 57'		Howe 81'	Stadium: Spotland Stadium; Attendance: 7,552

==== Final ====
10 May 2025
15:00 BST

Boreham Wood	2–2 (a.e.t.)	Rochdale
Rush 22'; Abdulmalik 69'	Report	Smith 78'; Dieseruvwe 90+7'
Penalties
Reynolds (penalty missed); Sousa (penalty scored); Rush (penalty missed); Coxe (penalty missed)	1–3	(penalty scored) Beckwith; (penalty scored) Francis; (penalty scored) Perry

Wembley Stadium, London
Attendance: 17,740
Referee: Andrew Humphries

=== Results ===
Home \ Away	ALD	ALT	BOR	BOS	BRK	BTR	CRL	EAS	HAL	FGR	GAT	HAR	MOR	ROC	SCU	SOL	SOU	SUT	TAM	TRU	WEA	WOK	YEO	YOR
Aldershot Town	—	2–1	1–2	2–3	2–2	1–1	0–2	2–3	3–2	2–3	0–1	1–0	4–0	0–2	3–1	1–5	0–2	2–2	1–2	0–2	4–1	1–2	1–4	0–3
Altrincham	3–2	—	3–1	1–0	2–1	2–1	1–2	1–0	0–1	1–2	3–1	0–2	1–1	0–3	4–2	2–0	1–0	2–1	1–2	2–0	1–0	1–3	0–1	1–2
Boreham Wood	1–0	3–1	—	1–2	5–3	2–1	2–0	2–0	2–1	1–1	3–0	3–0	3–0	0–2	1–3	2–1	1–1	1–0	1–2	2–1	5–1	1–0	3–2	3–2
Boston United	0–2	2–2	0–2	—	1–2	2–0	1–2	1–2	0–1	0–0	1–0	3–1	0–4	1–3	1–1	1–2	3–3	1–0	0–0	1–0	2–1	2–2	2–1	0–1
Brackley Town	2–1	0–2	1–3	1–1	—	1–1	0–1	1–0	1–1	1–0	0–0	0–0	0–2	2–1	1–1	1–1	0–3	1–0	0–1	1–0	0–2	1–4	2–1	2–3
Braintree Town	1–2	0–0	0–3	0–0	0–1	—	1–2	2–1	3–0	0–0	1–2	0–0	1–0	1–2	2–3	0–0	0–1	0–0	1–2	2–0	1–4	0–0	1–0	2–3
Carlisle United	2–0	3–1	3–3	6–2	3–0	5–0	—	1–1	2–0	4–2	0–0	3–1	1–0	0–2	3–2	1–1	2–2	3–0	2–1	3–0	2–0	1–3	3–0	0–3
Eastleigh	1–4	2–1	2–2	2–0	2–1	1–3	1–2	—	2–3	2–4	0–2	0–2	2–1	1–3	1–1	1–1	2–1	0–2	1–1	2–1	2–2	1–1	2–1	2–4
FC Halifax Town	4–2	2–1	3–2	2–1	2–0	4–0	0–1	2–2	—	1–2	1–2	0–1	1–0	2–2	1–2	3–0	2–6	2–2	2–2	1–0	2–2	1–1	3–2	1–1
Forest Green Rovers	2–1	1–1	2–1	2–3	4–0	3–1	1–3	1–0	2–1	—	3–1	1–0	5–0	0–1	1–1	1–1	2–1	4–0	4–2	1–1	2–0	4–2	2–0	1–1
Gateshead	3–3	0–2	0–3	1–3	1–2	1–0	0–3	1–3	1–2	0–2	—	0–1	4–4	0–2	2–0	0–2	0–3	1–1	2–1	2–2	1–0	0–3	2–1	3–1
Hartlepool United	0–3	1–0	0–0	1–1	0–0	2–0	3–1	1–0	0–1	2–1	2–1	—	1–1	0–0	1–2	2–0	4–3	0–2	1–1	3–1	1–1	3–0	0–2	1–2
Morecambe	0–2	2–1	0–3	0–3	2–0	1–1	2–2	4–0	1–2	1–3	2–5	2–3	—	1–2	2–2	0–2	0–3	2–2	2–2	1–2	4–3	0–2	0–0	0–1
Rochdale	1–0	2–1	4–1	1–0	3–2	2–0	1–0	2–0	1–2	2–1	4–0	1–2	2–4	—	1–1	4–1	2–1	1–0	3–2	2–0	2–1	3–0	3–0	1–1
Scunthorpe United	2–1	2–1	1–1	3–6	1–0	1–1	0–1	0–1	1–1	3–2	2–0	0–0	3–1	2–2	—	3–3	1–0	1–2	3–1	4–0	2–1 (Note: The National League awarded Scunthorpe United 3 points after the Scunthorpe United v Wealdstone match was abandoned in the 82nd minute with the score at 2–1. The goals scored in the match were not added to the league table.)	3–1	1–0	0–3
Solihull Moors	1–5	1–0	4–1	0–3	1–0	2–0	3–3	2–3	0–3	2–2	1–2	3–4	4–4	0–1	3–0	—	1–2	4–1	7–1	4–0	1–1	0–3	0–1	0–2
Southend United	3–0	3–0	0–2	1–1	2–0	3–2	1–2	4–1	3–0	2–0	1–1	1–1	5–1	3–2	0–2	0–0	—	1–0	2–0	1–1	2–1	1–1	2–1	0–0
Sutton United	0–0	1–2	3–4	1–1	1–1	1–1	2–1	2–1	2–0	1–1	4–2	3–3	0–5	1–2	2–3	0–0	0–3	—	2–3	0–3	3–0	2–1	1–2	1–2
Tamworth	1–1	5–1	3–2	1–3	1–1	5–1	2–1	1–0	0–2	1–0	3–1	1–1	1–1	1–2	1–2	1–0	2–1	0–1	—	2–0	1–1	0–1	1–0	0–1
Truro City	2–2	0–1	0–0	3–0	3–3	2–3	0–1	0–2	2–1	1–1	1–2	0–1	5–0	0–1	1–2	1–1	0–1	2–3	0–0	—	2–0	0–2	1–0	0–2
Wealdstone	3–0	1–1	0–4	1–1	2–1	1–0	0–1	0–0	2–1	1–1	2–2	7–0	2–3	1–3	1–1	5–1	3–2	4–2	3–2	2–0	—	1–0	0–2	0–3
Woking	3–2	1–1	2–2	1–1	2–0	0–1	0–2	3–3	0–1	0–2	5–0	4–0	5–1	0–0	1–2	0–0	1–1	1–1	3–1	2–2	1–2	—	1–0	1–1
Yeovil Town	1–2	1–0	0–3	2–1	2–1	3–1	1–1	1–1	0–0	0–2	3–4	0–0	3–2	1–1	0–3	1–4	0–1	3–2	2–0	1–0	0–2	1–0	—	1–3
York City	5–1	2–1	2–2	2–2	4–0	5–0	5–0	3–1	4–1	2–1	4–0	3–2	4–2	4–1	1–3	0–1	1–1	2–2	4–0	4–0	4–0	1–0	3–0	—

Legend: Blue = home team win; Yellow = draw; Red = away team win.
For upcoming matches, an "a" indicates there is an article about the rivalry between the two participants.

=== Season statistics ===
As of 25 April 2026

=== Top goalscorers ===
Rank	Player	Club	Goals
1	(England) Ollie Pearce	York City	34
2	(England) Emmanuel Dieseruvwe	Rochdale	26
3	(England) Matt Rush	Boreham Wood	25
4	(England) Will Harris	FC Halifax Town	22
5	(England) Regan Linney	Carlisle United	19
5	(England) Jack Nolan	Morecambe	19
7	(England) Callum Roberts	Scunthorpe United	18
7	(England) Josh Stones	York City	18
7	(England) Danny Whitehall	Scunthorpe United	18
10	(England) Aaron Blair	Eastleigh	17
10	(Scotland) Andrew Dallas	Southend United	17

=== Hat-tricks ===
Player	For	Against	Result	Date
(England) Regan Linney	Carlisle United	Braintree Town	5–0	25 August 2025
(England) Will Harris	FC Halifax Town	Solihull Moors	3–0	22 November 2025
(England) Joe Grey	York City	Aldershot Town	5–1	29 November 2025
(England) Ollie Pearce	York City	Truro City	4–1	20 December 2025
(England) Joe Sbarra	Solihull Moors	Tamworth	7–1	26 December 2025
(Republic of Ireland) Georgie Kelly	Carlisle United	Solihull Moors	3–3	17 January 2026
(England) Ollie Pearce	York City	Braintree Town	5–0	24 January 2026
(England) Tom Cursons	Boston United	Scunthorpe United	3–6	14 February 2026
(England) Danny Whitehall	Scunthorpe United	Solihull Moors	3–3	28 February 2026
(England) Jack Nolan	Morecambe	Sutton United	0–5	7 March 2026
(Kenya) Micah Obiero	Wealdstone	Hartlepool United	7–0	31 March 2026
(Republic of Ireland) James Clarke	Boreham Wood	Wealdstone	5–1	3 April 2026
(England) Matt Rush	Boreham Wood	Hartlepool United	3–0	11 April 2026

=== Monthly awards ===
Each month the Enterprise National League announces their official Player of the Month and Manager of the Month.

Month	Manager of the Month		Player of the Month		Reference
August	(Scotland) Jimmy McNulty	Rochdale	(England) Emmanuel Dieseruvwe	Rochdale	
September	(England) Luke Garrard	Boreham Wood	(England) Emmanuel Dieseruvwe	Rochdale	
October	(Wales) Mark Hughes	Carlisle United	(England) Abdul Abdulmalik	Boreham Wood	
November	(England) Stuart Maynard	York City	(England) Ollie Pearce	York City	
December	(England) Luke Garrard	Boreham Wood	(England) Josh Hmami	FC Halifax Town	
January	(England) Stuart Maynard	York City	(England) Ollie Pearce	York City	
February	(England) Paul Hurst	Boston United	(England) Tom Cursons	Boston United	
March	(Republic of Ireland) Rob Elliot	Gateshead	(England) Jack Nolan	Morecambe	
April	(England) Luke Garrard	Boreham Wood	(England) Oli Coker	Southend United	

=== Annual awards ===
Award	Winner	Club	Ref.
Player of the Season	(England) Ollie Pearce	York City	
Young Player of the Season	(England) Abdul Abdulmalik	Boreham Wood	
Manager of the Season	(England) Stuart Maynard	York City	

National League Team of the Season

Pos.	Player	Club	Ref.
GK	(England) Oliver Whatmuff	Rochdale	
RB	(England) Gus Scott-Morriss	Southend United	
CB	(England) Morgan Feeney	Carlisle United	
CB	(England) Kyron Gordon	Rochdale	
LB	(England) Malachi Fagan-Walcott	York City	
RW	(England) Callum Roberts	Scunthorpe United	
CM	(England) Alex Hunt	York City	
CM	(England) Zak Brunt	Boreham Wood	
LW	(England) Abdul Abdulmalik	Boreham Wood	
CF	(England) Ollie Pearce	York City	
CF	(England) Emmanuel Dieseruvwe	Rochdale	

== National League North ==
National League North
- Season: 2025–26
- Champions: AFC Fylde
- Promoted: AFC Fylde; Kidderminster Harriers
- Relegated: Leamington; Peterborough Sports; Curzon Ashton; Alfreton Town
- Matches: 552
- Goals: 1,686 (3.05 per match)

The National League North consists of 24 teams.

=== Team changes ===
To National League North

Relegated from the National League

- AFC Fylde

Promoted from the Northern Premier League Premier Division

- Macclesfield
- Worksop Town

Promoted from the Southern League Premier Division Central

- Bedford Town
- AFC Telford United

Promoted from the Southern League Premier Division South

- Merthyr Town

From National League North

Promoted to the National League

- Brackley Town
- Scunthorpe United

Relegated to the Northern Premier League Premier Division

- Warrington Town
- Rushall Olympic

Relegated to the Southern League Premier Division Central

- Needham Market

Relegated to the Northern Counties East Football League Premier Division

- Farsley Celtic

=== Stadiums and locations ===
Locations of the National League North 2025–26 teams
Locations of the National League North 2025–26 teams in NW England

Team	Location	Stadium	Capacity
AFC Fylde	Wesham	Mill Farm Sports Village	6,000
AFC Telford United	Telford	New Bucks Head	6,300
Alfreton Town	Alfreton	North Street	3,600
Bedford Town	Bedford	The Eyrie	3,000
Buxton	Buxton	The Silverlands	5,200
Chester	Chester	Deva Stadium	5,400
Chorley	Chorley	Victory Park	4,100
Curzon Ashton	Ashton-under-Lyne	Tameside Stadium	4,000
Darlington	Darlington	Blackwell Meadows	3,300
Hereford	Hereford	Edgar Street	5,250
Kidderminster Harriers	Kidderminster	Aggborough	6,238
King's Lynn Town	King's Lynn	The Walks	8,200
Leamington	Leamington	New Windmill Ground	3,050
Macclesfield	Macclesfield	Moss Rose	5,300
Marine	Crosby	Rossett Park	2,200
Merthyr Town	Merthyr Tydfil	Penydarren Park	4,000
Oxford City	Oxford (Marston)	Marsh Lane	3,500
Peterborough Sports	Peterborough	Lincoln Road	2,300
Radcliffe	Radcliffe	Stainton Park	3,500
Scarborough Athletic	Scarborough	Scarborough Sports Village	3,251
South Shields	South Shields	Mariners Park	4,000
Southport	Southport	Haig Avenue	6,008
Spennymoor Town	Spennymoor	The Brewery Field	4,300
Worksop Town	Worksop	Sandy Lane	2,500

=== Personnel and sponsoring ===
Team	Manager	Captain	Kit manufacturer	Shirt sponsor (front)
AFC Fylde	(Republic of Ireland) Craig Mahon	(Republic of Ireland) Corey Whelan	Surridge Sport	VetPlus
AFC Telford United	(England) Kevin Wilkin	(England) Alex Fletcher	Nike	Capgemini
Alfreton Town	(England) Jake Buxton	(England) Adam Lund	AlphaFC	Phantom
Bedford Town	(England) Lee Bircham	(England) Tyrone Marsh	Kappa	Harrisons Accountancy
Buxton	(Republic of Ireland) John McGrath	(England) Connor Kirby	Adidas	Buxton Natural Mineral Water
Chester	(Wales) Connell Rawlinson (interim)	(Wales) Declan Weeks	Hope + Glory	MBNA
Chorley	(England) Andy Preece	(England) Matthew Urwin	Puma	PAR Group
Curzon Ashton	(Northern Ireland) Adam Barton	(England) Jimmy Spencer	Adidas	Pinnacle Electrical Supplies
Darlington	(England) Steve Watson	(England) Tom Platt	Macron	Ebac
Hereford	(Australia) Aaron Downes	(England) Lewis Hudson	MandM	Dawleys
Kidderminster Harriers	(England) Adam Murray	(England) Amari Morgan-Smith	Scimitar	Adam Hewitt Ltd
King's Lynn Town	(Scotland) Paul Caddis	(England) Michael Clunan	Capelli Sport	Charmed Interiors
Leamington	(England) Scott Easterlow	(England) Adam Walker	Surridge Sport	G&R Scaffolding
Macclesfield	(England) John Rooney	(England) Paul Dawson	Adidas	Duck and Cover
Marine	(England) Bobby Grant	(England) Josh Wardle	Malooka	Marine Travel
Merthyr Town	(Wales) Paul Michael	(Wales) Matthew Harris	Macron	Vortex Competitions
Oxford City	(England) Ross Jenkins	(England) Josh Ashby	Macron	University of Oxford
Peterborough Sports	(England) Michael Gash	(England) Dan Jarvis	Stanno	Vital Energi
Radcliffe	(England) Bernard Morley	(England) George Glendon	Puma	Manchester Brick Specialists
Scarborough Athletic	(England) Jonathan Greening	(England) Will Thornton	Adidas	One Stop
South Shields	(England) Ian Watson	(England) Robbie Tinkler	Umbro	VW
Southport	(Guyana) Neil Danns	(Northern Ireland) Tom Moore	Macron	Birkdale Insurance Group
Spennymoor Town	Vacant	(England) Glen Taylor	Erreà	AMGT Developments
Worksop Town	(England) Craig Parry	(Algeria) Hamza Bencherif	Surridge Sport	Vortex Contract Management

=== Managerial changes ===
Team	Outgoing manager	Manner of departure	Date of vacancy	Position in table	Incoming manager	Date of appointment
Marine	(England) Neil Young	Club restructuring	26 April 2025	Pre-season	(England) Bobby Grant	10 May 2025
Southport	(Northern Ireland) David Morgan	End of interim spell	26 April 2025	Pre-season	(Guyana) Neil Danns	12 May 2025
AFC Fylde	David Longwell & (England) Chris Neal	End of interim spell	5 May 2025	Pre-season	(Republic of Ireland) Craig Mahon	13 June 2025
Kidderminster Harriers	(England) Phil Brown	Sacked	7 May 2025	Pre-season	(England) Adam Murray	20 May 2025
King's Lynn Town	(England) Adam Lakeland	Sacked	14 May 2025	Pre-season	(England) James Rowe	22 May 2025
South Shields	(England) Elliott Dickman	Sacked	14 May 2025	Pre-season	(England) Ian Watson	28 May 2025
Curzon Ashton	(Republic of Ireland) Craig Mahon	Signed by AFC Fylde	13 June 2025	Pre-season	(England) Mark Bradshaw	20 June 2025
Macclesfield	(Wales) Robbie Savage	Signed by Forest Green Rovers	1 July 2025	Pre-season	(England) John Rooney	1 July 2025
Alfreton Town	(England) Billy Heath	Resigned	3 September 2025	22nd	(England) Jake Buxton	17 October 2025
Peterborough Sports	(England) Michael Gash and Luke Steele	Sacked	10 September 2025	24th	(England) Phil Brown	11 September 2025
King's Lynn Town	(England) James Rowe	Resigned	24 September 2025	9th	(England) Ian Culverhouse	28 October 2025
Leamington	(England) Paul Holleran	Resigned	31 December 2025	24th	(England) Scott Easterlow	11 March 2026
Hereford	(Scotland) Paul Caddis	Sacked	11 February 2026	23rd	(Australia) Aaron Downes	16 February 2026
Spennymoor Town	(England) Graeme Lee	Sacked	22 February 2026	13th	(England) Tommy Miller & (England) Matthew Dolan (interim)	23 February 2026
Chester	(England) Calum McIntyre	Mutual consent	28 February 2026	10th	(Wales) Connell Rawlinson (interim)	1 March 2026
Peterborough Sports	(England) Phil Brown	Club restructure	3 March 2026	21st	(England) Michael Gash	3 March 2026
King's Lynn Town	(England) Ian Culverhouse	Mutual consent	4 March 2026	19th	(Scotland) Paul Caddis	5 March 2026
Curzon Ashton	(England) Mark Bradshaw	Sacked	18 March 2026	16th	(Northern Ireland) Adam Barton	20 March 2026

=== Table ===
Pos	Team	Pld	W	D	L	GF	GA	GD	Pts	Promotion, qualification or relegation
1	AFC Fylde (C, P)	46	32	4	10	112	51	+61	100	Promotion to the National League
2	South Shields	46	28	11	7	99	43	+56	95	Qualification for the National League North play-off semi-finals
3	Kidderminster Harriers (O, P)	46	25	12	9	74	51	+23	87	Qualification for the National League North play-off semi-finals
4	Macclesfield	46	24	7	15	81	68	+13	79	Qualification for the National League North play-off quarter-finals
5	Buxton	46	22	7	17	83	61	+22	73	Qualification for the National League North play-off quarter-finals
6	Scarborough Athletic	46	19	16	11	61	52	+9	73	Qualification for the National League North play-off quarter-finals
7	Chester	46	20	13	13	66	64	+2	73	Qualification for the National League North play-off quarter-finals
8	Merthyr Town	46	22	4	20	95	86	+9	70	
9	Darlington	46	20	9	17	78	68	+10	69	
10	Spennymoor Town	46	19	11	16	62	69	−7	68	
11	AFC Telford United	46	17	14	15	85	65	+20	65	
12	Marine	46	18	8	20	62	72	−10	62	
13	Radcliffe	46	18	6	22	76	83	−7	60	
14	Southport	46	16	12	18	64	71	−7	60	
15	Chorley	46	15	12	19	66	65	+1	57	
16	Worksop Town	46	16	9	21	66	74	−8	57	
17	Oxford City	46	15	11	20	62	67	−5	56	
18	Bedford Town	46	13	14	19	66	77	−11	53	
19	King's Lynn Town	46	12	16	18	56	64	−8	52	
20	Hereford	46	14	10	22	64	79	−15	52	
21	Curzon Ashton (R)	46	13	13	20	67	88	−21	52	Relegation to the Northern Premier League Premier Division
22	Alfreton Town (R)	46	12	14	20	49	82	−33	50	Relegation to the Northern Premier League Premier Division
23	Peterborough Sports (R)	46	10	9	27	51	96	−45	39	Relegation to the Southern League Premier Division Central
24	Leamington (R)	46	7	8	31	41	90	−49	29	Relegation to the Southern League Premier Division Central

Source: National League official site
Rules for classification: 1) Points; 2) Goal difference; 3) Number of goals scored; 4) Number of matches won; 5) Head-to-head results
(C) Champions; (O) Play-off winners; (P) Promoted; (R) Relegated

=== Play-offs ===
Quarter-finals
5	Buxton	4
6	Scarborough Athletic	2
4	Macclesfield	2
7	Chester	1

Semi-finals
2	South Shields	1
5	Buxton	0
3	Kidderminster Harriers	3
4	Macclesfield	1

Final
2	South Shields	0
3	Kidderminster Harriers	2

==== Quarter-finals ====
28 April 2026	Buxton	4–2	Scarborough Athletic	Buxton
19:45 BST	Coleman 60', 75'; Brennan 66'; Mee 87'		Walker 67'; Green 90+1'	Stadium: The Silverlands; Attendance: 2,035

29 April 2026	Macclesfield	2–1	Chester	Macclesfield
19:45 BST	Kay 66'; Duffy 90+6'		Woods 36'	Stadium: Moss Rose; Attendance: 3,548

==== Semi-finals ====
2 May 2026	Kidderminster Harriers	3–1	Macclesfield	Kidderminster
12:30 BST	Faakye 20'; Donnelly 45+4'; Thompson 90'		Matheson 90+2'	Stadium: Aggborough Stadium; Attendance: 4,426

2 May 2026	South Shields	1–0	Buxton	South Shields
16:00 BST	Blackett 41'			Stadium: Mariners Park; Attendance: 2,329

==== Final ====
9 May 2026

South Shields	0–2	Kidderminster Harriers
		Donnelly 35'; Cooper 37'

Mariners Park, South Shields
Attendance: 3,628

=== Results ===
Home \ Away	FYL	TEL	ALF	BED	BUX	CHE	CHO	CZA	DAR	HER	KID	KLT	LEA	MAC	MAR	MER	OXF	PET	RAD	SCA	SSH	SPT	SPE	WRK
AFC Fylde	—	2–1	3–0	1–0	1–2	2–2	1–0	5–1	4–1	2–1	2–1	4–1	1–1	5–1	2–0	1–0	3–2	5–2	4–3	2–1	2–4	4–0	5–0	2–3
AFC Telford United	1–3	—	4–1	2–2	0–1	3–1	2–2	1–1	1–1	3–0	1–2	2–1	1–2	3–0	0–2	2–4	4–0	3–2	2–0	4–1	1–1	2–2	3–0	2–1
Alfreton Town	0–1	1–0	—	1–2	2–2	0–2	1–0	3–3	0–3	2–1	1–1	1–1	2–1	0–2	2–0	3–2	1–1	0–2	1–1	2–1	0–2	1–1	2–1	1–1
Bedford Town	0–2	3–1	2–2	—	3–0	1–2	2–0	2–2	3–4	2–2	0–0	4–2	3–1	1–2	1–1	3–4	1–0	4–1	1–0	1–1	1–2	2–3	0–3	0–2
Buxton	0–3	0–2	6–0	3–0	—	1–2	3–2	2–3	1–0	1–2	1–3	1–2	4–1	2–4	4–0	1–2	2–1	0–0	2–1	2–0	1–1	1–2	1–2	3–1
Chester	1–0	2–1	2–2	1–2	1–0	—	3–3	1–1	2–1	1–1	1–1	0–0	2–0	2–0	1–1	2–2	2–1	3–2	1–3	1–1	1–3	1–2	2–1	0–1
Chorley	2–0	3–1	0–1	1–0	1–2	3–0	—	0–1	1–2	4–2	2–1	4–0	1–1	3–2	2–1	0–2	3–3	0–1	0–1	2–2	1–1	4–2	0–0	2–1
Curzon Ashton	1–3	0–8	2–1	2–2	0–4	0–1	2–0	—	1–2	2–1	0–1	3–0	1–1	0–2	4–1	0–3	2–2	1–0	0–3	1–2	1–2	1–3	2–2	3–1
Darlington	1–3	2–2	3–1	2–0	0–2	1–1	2–3	3–3	—	1–1	0–2	1–1	1–0	1–2	2–3	3–1	1–3	5–2	3–0	1–2	1–2	2–0	1–0	5–1
Hereford	1–4	1–1	2–0	2–2	0–2	5–2	1–4	3–3	1–0	—	0–1	0–2	5–1	0–2	2–1	3–0	1–2	2–2	3–1	1–2	2–1	1–2	1–2	2–1
Kidderminster Harriers	1–0	3–0	1–0	2–1	2–2	1–1	3–1	1–0	1–2	2–1	—	4–1	3–2	1–1	4–0	0–0	1–1	4–0	1–5	1–0	1–0	1–1	1–0	2–2
King's Lynn Town	1–2	1–1	0–2	0–1	3–2	0–2	1–1	0–0	1–1	0–0	0–1	—	2–0	1–1	1–0	4–0	1–2	2–2	1–3	2–3	3–0	2–0	0–1	0–1
Leamington	1–1	1–3	1–2	2–2	0–1	0–2	1–0	2–1	0–1	1–2	2–3	2–5	—	0–1	0–1	1–2	0–0	4–2	2–1	1–2	0–2	2–1	0–2	1–2
Macclesfield	1–4	1–1	1–1	2–1	0–2	0–2	1–2	3–2	2–1	3–1	5–1	4–0	3–1	—	0–1	1–3	3–0	3–1	2–1	1–1	1–0	2–1	0–2	3–1
Marine	0–1	2–1	2–3	2–1	2–1	2–1	2–1	0–4	1–4	0–1	2–0	1–1	5–0	2–4	—	1–3	0–0	0–1	3–0	1–1	2–2	4–2	0–2	4–2
Merthyr Town	2–4	1–4	6–2	7–1	1–3	1–2	2–3	2–1	3–1	2–2	0–1	1–0	4–1	1–2	1–3	—	1–1	2–0	0–5	1–3	3–1	2–0	2–3	2–0
Oxford City	1–0	0–0	5–0	1–2	2–1	1–2	2–0	1–2	5–1	3–0	3–2	0–1	1–1	2–1	0–2	1–3	—	2–0	1–5	0–2	1–3	1–2	1–2	2–0
Peterborough Sports	0–5	2–3	1–1	3–1	1–2	3–0	2–1	1–1	0–1	0–2	2–1	2–2	0–0	4–3	0–0	0–3	0–0	—	3–0	0–4	0–3	0–1	1–3	0–1
Radcliffe	3–3	2–2	3–1	0–0	1–5	1–3	2–2	3–3	3–1	1–0	1–3	0–1	2–1	1–0	4–1	1–3	1–0	2–1	—	1–4	2–5	1–2	0–2	2–1
Scarborough Athletic	2–1	1–1	0–0	2–2	2–1	1–0	0–0	1–0	0–1	0–0	0–2	1–1	2–0	2–2	1–2	2–1	1–0	3–1	0–3	—	2–2	2–0	1–0	0–0
South Shields	2–1	2–2	3–0	1–1	2–2	4–0	2–0	3–0	0–1	2–1	1–2	1–1	3–0	4–1	1–0	4–1	4–1	2–1	3–0	4–0	—	1–0	6–0	3–1
Southport	2–3	2–0	2–1	3–1	0–0	2–2	1–1	2–4	2–2	5–1	2–2	0–0	1–2	1–2	2–1	1–0	1–3	2–3	2–0	1–1	0–0	—	2–0	1–1
Spennymoor Town	0–5	0–2	1–1	0–0	2–2	1–2	1–0	4–1	0–4	2–0	3–1	0–5	2–0	0–0	1–1	6–4	1–1	1–0	2–3	1–1	1–1	2–0	—	0–1
Worksop Town	1–0	3–1	1–0	0–2	1–2	2–1	1–1	0–1	1–1	2–3	1–1	2–2	2–0	2–4	1–2	3–5	1–2	8–0	2–0	1–0	0–3	2–0	3–3	—

Source: National League North Results Grid
Legend: Blue = home team win; Yellow = draw; Red = away team win.
For upcoming matches, an "a" indicates there is an article about the rivalry between the two participants.

=== Season statistics ===
As of 25 April 2026

=== Top goalscorers ===
Rank	Player	Club	Goals
1	(England) Paul Blackett	South Shields	29
2	(England) Rio Clegg	Radcliffe	27
2	(England) Danny Ormerod	AFC Fylde	27
4	(England) Tyrone Marsh	Bedford Town	26
5	(Wales) Ricardo Rees	Merthyr Town	25
6	(England) Glen Taylor	Spennymoor Town	23
7	(England) Luca Thomas	AFC Fylde	22
8	(Suriname) Cedric Main	Darlington	20

=== Hat-tricks ===
Player	For	Against	Result	Date
(Germany) Michael Gyasi	King's Lynn Town	Spennymoor Town	0–5	19 August 2025
(England) Rio Clegg	Radcliffe	Oxford City	1–5	30 August 2025
(England) Tom Handley	Merthyr Town	Macclesfield	1–3	2 September 2025
(England) Rio Clegg	Radcliffe	Merthyr Town	0–5	20 September 2025
(Saint Kitts and Nevis) Omari Sterling-James	Hereford	Curzon Ashton	3–3	1 November 2025
(Wales) Ricardo Rees^{4}	Merthyr Town	AFC Telford United	2–4	4 November 2025
(Wales) Ricardo Rees	Merthyr Town	Alfreton Town	6–2	22 November 2025
(England) DJ Sturridge	Oxford City	Darlington	5–1	6 December 2025
(England) Cedwyn Scott	South Shields	Spennymoor Town	6–0	26 December 2025
(England) Brad Holmes	Curzon Ashton	Southport	2–4	30 December 2025
(England) Cawley Cox	Merthyr Town	Worksop Town	3–5	10 January 2026
(England) Shaq Coulthirst	Peterborough Sports	Chester	3–0	24 January 2026
(England) Dylan Allen-Hadley	AFC Telford United	Merthyr Town	1–4	27 January 2026
(England) D'Mani Mellor	Macclesfield	Kidderminster Harriers	5–1	3 February 2026
(Turkey) Jonathan Ustabaşi	AFC Fylde	Spennymoor Town	5–0	10 February 2026
(England) Tony Weston	Curzon Ashton	Marine	4–1	10 February 2026
(England) Tyrone Marsh^{4}	Bedford Town	Peterborough Sports	4–1	24 February 2026
(England) George Munday	Hereford	Leamington	5–1	10 March 2026
(England) Oliver Greaves	Worksop Town	Peterborough Sports	8–0	18 April 2026
(England) Szhem Whyte-Hall	Worksop Town	Peterborough Sports	8–0	18 April 2026

=== Monthly awards ===
Each month the Enterprise National League announces their official Player of the Month and Manager of the Month.

Month	Manager of the Month		Player of the Month		Reference
August	(England) Ian Watson	South Shields	(Germany) Michael Gyasi	King's Lynn Town	
September	(England) Ian Watson	South Shields	(England) Rio Clegg	Radcliffe	
October	(Republic of Ireland) John McGrath	Buxton	(England) Nathan Ashmore	Bedford Town	
November	(England) Paul Michael	Merthyr Town	(Wales) Ricardo Rees	Merthyr Town	
December	(England) Adam Murray	Kidderminster Harriers	(England) Matty Stenson	AFC Telford United	
January	(England) John Rooney	Macclesfield	(England) David Davis	Kidderminster Harriers	
February	(Republic of Ireland) Craig Mahon	AFC Fylde	(England) Jonathan Ustabaşi	AFC Fylde	
March	(England) John Rooney	Macclesfield	(England) Tom Whelan	AFC Fylde	
April	(England) Adam Murray	Kidderminster Harriers	(England) Rio Clegg	Radcliffe	

=== Annual awards ===
Award	Winner	Club	Ref.
Player of the Season	(England) Danny Ormerod	AFC Fylde	
Young Player of the Season	(England) Danny Ormerod	AFC Fylde	
Manager of the Season	(Republic of Ireland) Craig Mahon	AFC Fylde	

National League North Team of the Season

Pos.	Player	Club	Ref.
GK	(Wales) Christian Dibble	Kidderminster Harriers	
RB	(England) Joe Foulkes	Kidderminster Harriers	
CB	(England) Paul Dawson	Macclesfield	
CB	(England) Robbie Tinkler	South Shields	
LB	(England) Oliver Bainbridge	South Shields	
CM	(Wales) Lewys Twamley	Merthyr Town	
CM	(England) Tom Whelan	AFC Fylde	
CM	(England) Luca Thomas	AFC Fylde	
CF	(England) Tyrone Marsh	Bedford Town	
CF	(England) Danny Ormerod	AFC Fylde	
CF	(England) Paul Blackett	South Shields	

== National League South ==
National League South
- Season: 2025–26
- Champions: Worthing
- Promoted: Worthing; Hornchurch
- Relegated: Eastbourne Borough; Enfield Town; Chippenham Town; Bath City
- Matches: 552
- Goals: 1,577 (2.86 per match)
- Biggest home win: Maidstone United 8-0 Enfield Town, 24 February 2026
- Biggest away win: Salisbury 0-6 Maidenhead United, 25 November 2025
- Highest scoring: Salisbury 5-4 Worthing, 10 January 2026 Maidstone United 5-4 Hornchurch, 6 April 2026 Worthing 7-2 Dagenham & Redbridge F.C., 11 April 2026

The National League South also consists of 24 teams.

=== Team changes ===
To National League South

Relegated from the National League

- Dagenham & Redbridge
- Maidenhead United
- Ebbsfleet United

Promoted from the Isthmian League Premier Division

- Horsham
- Dover Athletic

Promoted from the Southern League Premier Division South

- AFC Totton

From National League South

Promoted to the National League

- Truro City
- Boreham Wood

Relegated to the Isthmian League Premier Division

- St. Albans City
- Welling United
- Aveley

Relegated to the Southern League Premier Division South

- Weymouth

=== Stadiums and locations ===
Locations of the National League South 2025–26 teams (Greater London shown in more detail below)
Locations of the National League South 2025–26 teams (Greater London clubs)

Team	Location	Stadium	Capacity
AFC Totton	Totton	Testwood Stadium	3,000
Bath City	Bath (Twerton)	Twerton Park	8,840
Chelmsford City	Chelmsford	Melbourne Stadium	3,502
Chesham United	Chesham	The Meadow	5,000
Chippenham Town	Chippenham	Hardenhuish Park	3,000
Dagenham & Redbridge	London (Dagenham)	Victoria Road	6,078
Dorking Wanderers	Dorking	Meadowbank Stadium	4,250
Dover Athletic	Dover	Crabble Athletic Ground	6,500
Eastbourne Borough	Eastbourne	Priory Lane	4,151
Ebbsfleet United	Northfleet	Stonebridge Road	4,800
Enfield Town	London (Enfield)	Queen Elizabeth II Stadium	3,000
Farnborough	Farnborough	Cherrywood Road	7,000
Hampton & Richmond Borough	London (Hampton)	Beveree Stadium	3,500
Hemel Hempstead Town	Hemel Hempstead	Vauxhall Road	3,152
Hornchurch	London (Upminster)	Hornchurch Stadium	3,500
Horsham	Horsham	Hop Oast Stadium	3,000
Maidenhead United	Maidenhead	York Road	4,000
Maidstone United	Maidstone	Gallagher Stadium	4,200
Salisbury	Salisbury	Raymond McEnhill Stadium	5,000
Slough Town	Slough	Arbour Park	2,000
Tonbridge Angels	Tonbridge	Longmead Stadium	3,000
Torquay United	Torquay	Plainmoor	6,500
Weston-super-Mare	Weston-super-Mare	Woodspring Stadium	3,500
Worthing	Worthing	Woodside Road	4,000

=== Personnel and sponsoring ===
Team	Manager	Captain	Kit manufacturer	Shirt sponsor (front)
AFC Totton	(England) Scott Rendell (interim)	(England) Mike Carter	Macron	Garmin
Bath City	(England) Scott Bartlett	(England) Kieran Parselle	Macron	Bath Spa University
Chelmsford City	(England) Ricky Holmes (interim)	(England) Dominic Odusanya	Surridge Sport	European Medical Journal
Chesham United	(England) James Duncan (England) Michael Murray	(England) Tyrone Marsh	Karuta	Taskmaster
Chippenham Town	(England) Gary Horgan	(England) Luke Haines	Uhlsport	Thornbury Surfacing
Dagenham & Redbridge	(England) Andy Carroll (interim)	(France) Timothée Dieng	Umbro	West & Coe
Dorking Wanderers	(England) Marc White	(England) Charlie Carter	Macron	OLBG.com
Dover Athletic	(England) Jake Leberl	(England) Mitch Walker	VX3	Megger
Eastbourne Borough	(England) Steve King	(England) Harry Phipps	Erreà	Norwegian Cruise Line
Ebbsfleet United	(England) Josh Wright	(Germany) Max Ehmer	Admiral	Virtue Clean Energy
Enfield Town	(England) Gavin MacPherson	(England) Mickey Parcell	Macron	Powerday
Farnborough	(England) Spencer Day	(England) Ollie Robinson	O'Neills	Tratech Consulting
Hampton & Richmond Borough	(England) Alan Dowson	(England) Alan Massey	Erreà	tytl
Hemel Hempstead Town	(England) Lee Allinson	(England) Kyle Ajayi	Erreà	L Lynch
Hornchurch	(Republic of Ireland) Daryl McMahon	(England) Tom Wraight	Macron	BF Mulley & Son
Horsham	(England) Dominic di Paola	(England) Jack Brivio	Joma	Lines & James
Maidenhead United	(England) Ryan Peters (interim)	(England) Will de Havilland	Kelme	CALM
Maidstone United	(Cameroon) George Elokobi	(England) Sam Corne	Macron	Manchett
Salisbury	(England) Brian Dutton	(England) Josh Sommerton	Macron	Retain Healthcare
Slough Town	(England) Scott Davies	(Kenya) Henry Ochieng	Macron	Stoke Park
Tonbridge Angels	(Republic of Ireland) Alan Dunne	(England) Scott Wagstaff	Hope & Glory	Halcyon Wealth
Torquay United	(England) Jimmy Ball	(England) Sam Dreyer	VX3	Rev Comps
Weston-super-Mare	(England) Scott Rogers	(Wales) Emlyn Lewis	Uhlsport	Avalis Glacier Water
Worthing	(England) Adam Hinshelwood	(England) Joel Colbran	Macron	Drip

=== Managerial changes ===
Team	Outgoing manager	Manner of departure	Date of vacancy	Position in table	Incoming manager(s)	Date of appointment
Chelmsford City	(England) Robbie Simpson	Resigned	11 January 2025	Pre-season	(Wales) Angelo Harrop	19 May 2025
Tonbridge Angels	(England) Scott Wagstaff	End of interim spell	26 April 2025	Pre-season	(England) Craig Nelson	26 April 2025
Dagenham & Redbridge	(England) Lewis Young	Sacked	8 May 2025	Pre-season	(England) Lee Bradbury	4 June 2025
Eastbourne Borough	(England) Adam Murray	Resigned	16 May 2025	Pre-season	(England) Matt Gray	23 May 2025
Tonbridge Angels	(England) Craig Nelson	Sacked	21 September 2025	15th	(Republic of Ireland) Alan Dunne	22 September 2025
Weston-super-Mare	(England) Scott Bartlett	Signed by Eastleigh	24 September 2025	2nd	(England) Scott Rogers	10 October 2025
Worthing	(England) Chris Agutter	Signed by Sutton United	2 October 2025	11th	(England) Adam Hinshelwood	9 October 2025
Eastbourne Borough	(England) Matt Gray	Sacked	7 October 2025	22nd	(England) Tommy Widdrington	16 October 2025
Maidenhead United	(England) Alan Devonshire	Resigned	30 November 2025	13th	(England) Ryan Peters (interim)	30 November 2025
Hampton & Richmond	(England) Alan Julian	Mutual consent	1 December 2025	22nd	(England) Alan Dowson	8 December 2025
Eastbourne Borough	(England) Tommy Widdrington	Sacked	18 February 2026	24th	(England) Steve King	9 March 2026
Torquay United	(England) Paul Wotton	Sacked	1 March 2026	4th	(England) Jimmy Ball	18 March 2026
Dagenham & Redbridge	(England) Lee Bradbury	Sacked	18 March 2026	12th	(England) Andy Carroll (interim)	18 March 2026
AFC Totton	(England) Jimmy Ball	Signed by Torquay United	18 March 2026	13th	(England) Scott Rendell (Note: Rendell was originally appointed interim manager before being given the role permanently on 21 April 2026.)	18 March 2026
Bath City	(England) Darren Way	Sacked	22 March 2026	22nd	(England) Scott Bartlett	26 March 2026
Chelmsford City	(Wales) Angelo Harrop	Sacked	2 April 2026	11th	(England) Ricky Holmes (interim)	2 April 2026

=== Table ===
Pos	Team	Pld	W	D	L	GF	GA	GD	Pts	Promotion, qualification or relegation
1	Worthing (C, P)	46	25	9	12	99	52	+47	84	Promotion to the National League
2	Hornchurch (O, P)	46	23	12	11	81	64	+17	81	Qualification for the National League South play-off semi-finals
3	Torquay United	46	24	8	14	87	62	+25	80	Qualification for the National League South play-off semi-finals
4	Dorking Wanderers	46	23	10	13	78	61	+17	79	Qualification for the National League South play-off quarter-finals
5	Hemel Hempstead Town	46	23	10	13	55	48	+7	79	Qualification for the National League South play-off quarter-finals
6	Weston-super-Mare	46	23	9	14	61	48	+13	78	Qualification for the National League South play-off quarter-finals
7	Maidenhead United	46	22	11	13	66	41	+25	77	Qualification for the National League South play-off quarter-finals
8	Maidstone United	46	22	11	13	72	50	+22	77	
9	Ebbsfleet United	46	22	11	13	73	54	+19	77	
10	Chelmsford City	46	21	10	15	73	62	+11	73	
11	Chesham United	46	21	9	16	68	55	+13	72	
12	AFC Totton	46	20	6	20	60	79	−19	66	
13	Dagenham & Redbridge	46	17	13	16	61	62	−1	64	
14	Tonbridge Angels	46	16	12	18	66	65	+1	60	
15	Horsham	46	15	14	17	53	54	−1	59	
16	Slough Town	46	15	9	22	69	87	−18	54	
17	Salisbury	46	14	11	21	50	65	−15	53	
18	Hampton & Richmond Borough	46	14	11	21	56	72	−16	53	
19	Farnborough	46	14	11	21	72	92	−20	53	
20	Dover Athletic	46	13	11	22	60	75	−15	50	
21	Bath City (R)	46	10	13	23	50	77	−27	43	Relegation to the Southern League Premier Division South
22	Chippenham Town (R)	46	11	9	26	53	80	−27	42	Relegation to the Southern League Premier Division South
23	Enfield Town (R)	46	9	13	24	55	82	−27	40	Relegation to the Isthmian League Premier Division
24	Eastbourne Borough (R)	46	9	9	28	59	90	−31	36	Relegation to the Isthmian League Premier Division

Source: National League official site
Rules for classification: 1) Points; 2) Goal difference; 3) Number of goals scored; 4) Number of matches won; 5) Head-to-head results
(C) Champions; (O) Play-off winners; (P) Promoted; (R) Relegated

=== Play-offs ===
Quarter-finals
5	Hemel Hempstead Town	1 (5)
6	Weston-super-Mare (p)	1 (6)
4	Dorking Wanderers	2
7	Maidenhead United	0

Semi-finals
2	Hornchurch	2
6	Weston-super-Mare	0
3	Torquay United	4
4	Dorking Wanderers	2

Final
2	Hornchurch (a.e.t.)	3
3	Torquay United	2

==== Quarter-finals ====
28 April 2026	Hemel Hempstead Town	1–1 (a.e.t.) (5–6 p)	Weston-super-Mare	Hemel Hempstead
19:45 BST	White 90+3'		Britton 74'	Stadium: Vauxhall Road; Attendance: 2,357
	Penalties
	Noel-Williams (penalty scored); Wilkinson (penalty scored); White (penalty missed); Cook-Appiah (penalty scored); Lorentzen-Jones (penalty scored); Dyer (penalty scored); Lomas (penalty missed)		(penalty scored) Coulson; (penalty scored) Britton; (penalty scored) Backwell; (penalty scored) Chamberlain; (penalty missed) Lewis; (penalty scored) Pecover; (penalty scored) Martin

29 April 2026	Dorking Wanderers	2–0	Maidenhead United	Dorking
19:45 BST	Rutherford 21'; Sidwell 43'			Stadium: Meadowbank Stadium; Attendance: 3,194

==== Semi-finals ====
2 May 2026	Torquay United	4–2	Dorking Wanderers	Torquay
12:30 BST	Moore 21', 59'; Young 31', 77'		Knight 83'; Rutherford 89'	Stadium: Plainmoor; Attendance: 4,800

2 May 2026	Hornchurch	2–0	Weston-super-Mare	Upminster
16:00 BST	Rees 51'; Sandat 61'			Stadium: Hornchurch Stadium; Attendance: 3,500

==== Final ====
9 May 2026
15:00 BST

Hornchurch	3–2 (a.e.t.)	Torquay United
Poleon 45' (pen.); Hearn 90+3'; Ling 117'		Moore 6', 78'

Hornchurch Stadium, Upminster
Attendance: 3,500
Referee: Matthew Norton

=== Results ===
Home \ Away	TOT	BAT	CHL	CHS	CHI	D&R	DOR	DOV	EAB	EBB	ENF	FAR	HRB	HHT	HNC	HRM	MHD	MST	SAL	SLO	TON	TRQ	WSM	WOR
AFC Totton	—	2–1	2–1	1–1	1–1	0–5	2–1	3–0	2–1	0–2	3–2	1–6	1–1	2–1	1–0	3–0	2–1	0–1	2–1	1–1	3–0	1–0	3–1	0–3
Bath City	2–0	—	0–1	4–2	1–0	0–0	1–2	1–2	2–0	2–2	1–1	0–1	0–4	0–3	2–2	0–2	0–4	2–3	2–0	0–1	1–1	0–0	0–0	3–2
Chelmsford City	1–1	7–1	—	2–1	2–1	1–4	1–1	1–2	1–3	0–1	3–0	2–5	1–0	1–0	2–0	1–0	1–1	1–1	2–2	2–0	1–0	0–2	1–0	1–2
Chesham United	1–2	0–0	0–2	—	2–1	0–1	2–1	0–1	1–0	4–1	4–1	3–2	1–2	1–0	1–2	0–0	1–1	4–2	0–1	4–1	1–0	1–0	4–0	1–2
Chippenham Town	2–0	3–2	0–1	1–4	—	0–1	2–2	1–1	5–2	1–4	1–0	2–2	1–1	0–1	1–3	1–3	1–0	1–0	2–2	2–1	1–0	1–0	1–2	1–0
Dagenham & Redbridge	0–2	1–0	3–3	3–1	4–2	—	1–0	2–0	2–0	0–2	3–2	0–0	3–1	2–1	2–3	1–2	1–0	1–2	0–1	0–0	2–2	1–0	0–0	2–5
Dorking Wanderers	2–1	1–3	1–1	1–1	2–1	0–0	—	2–0	4–2	3–1	2–1	5–3	0–3	2–1	1–0	2–0	1–0	3–1	3–0	2–0	4–1	3–1	3–2	1–2
Dover Athletic	2–3	1–0	0–1	2–2	1–2	2–2	2–2	—	2–5	1–2	4–1	1–3	3–3	1–2	4–1	1–1	1–2	0–2	2–0	2–0	2–0	2–3	1–1	1–1
Eastbourne Borough	2–3	2–2	1–2	1–2	2–2	1–2	1–2	0–1	—	1–3	1–1	1–2	6–0	0–0	1–2	0–2	0–1	3–1	0–0	1–1	1–1	4–2	1–2	0–3
Ebbsfleet United	4–0	1–1	1–0	2–1	1–0	1–0	2–1	4–0	2–2	—	2–2	2–2	4–0	2–2	1–1	1–2	3–0	1–0	2–0	2–1	1–0	3–0	1–3	1–2
Enfield Town	0–1	1–1	0–4	3–4	1–0	0–0	2–4	3–1	1–2	3–1	—	5–1	1–1	0–0	0–1	2–1	0–0	2–1	1–2	5–2	1–1	1–2	0–1	1–1
Farnborough	4–2	2–2	4–2	0–1	2–1	2–3	2–0	1–2	1–1	1–1	0–5	—	0–2	2–3	2–2	2–0	1–0	0–2	1–0	2–0	1–6	1–3	1–3	1–0
Hampton & Richmond Borough	2–0	1–2	1–3	0–1	1–1	2–1	0–2	2–1	1–2	3–2	1–0	3–1	—	1–2	2–2	2–0	1–3	0–0	0–0	2–3	0–3	2–2	0–1	1–0
Hemel Hempstead Town	2–0	1–0	2–1	0–3	3–2	1–0	2–0	1–2	3–1	0–0	3–0	1–0	0–3	—	0–4	1–1	0–0	1–1	1–1	0–3	1–0	2–1	3–0	1–0
Hornchurch	1–1	3–2	3–3	1–1	3–0	3–0	1–0	0–0	2–0	1–0	2–2	3–1	2–1	0–1	—	1–1	0–0	1–2	1–0	2–3	3–2	1–2	3–2	2–1
Horsham	0–2	2–1	2–3	1–2	3–2	1–1	3–0	1–1	2–0	1–1	1–0	2–2	0–0	2–0	0–2	—	1–2	0–0	1–1	1–0	0–1	2–1	1–1	3–4
Maidenhead United	2–0	3–0	2–1	1–2	3–0	2–0	2–0	1–0	0–1	2–3	3–0	2–2	2–1	2–2	2–0	2–1	—	2–1	2–1	1–3	1–1	1–2	1–2	1–0
Maidstone United	3–1	2–0	0–0	0–0	3–0	2–1	1–1	1–0	3–0	3–0	8–0	1–0	2–0	0–1	5–4	0–3	0–1	—	1–0	1–2	1–2	1–1	2–1	2–1
Salisbury	3–1	0–1	3–0	1–2	1–0	0–0	0–2	2–1	2–0	1–1	2–0	1–0	1–1	1–0	3–3	2–1	0–6	0–1	—	2–1	1–3	0–1	1–2	5–4
Slough Town	3–2	2–3	5–0	3–0	3–2	3–2	1–2	1–1	2–1	2–0	1–1	2–0	1–3	0–1	2–5	0–0	2–2	1–4	3–3	—	2–3	1–5	1–0	1–2
Tonbridge Angels	4–1	2–1	2–4	0–0	3–2	2–2	2–2	2–1	3–4	1–2	1–2	3–3	2–0	1–3	0–1	1–2	0–1	1–1	3–2	0–0	—	1–2	0–0	1–0
Torquay United	3–1	4–1	0–5	2–1	3–0	0–0	2–2	3–2	7–0	1–0	3–1	2–2	4–1	1–2	1–2	2–0	1–1	1–1	2–1	4–2	1–2	—	3–1	3–2
Weston-super-Mare	1–0	2–1	0–0	1–0	1–0	3–0	1–1	1–2	3–1	1–0	1–0	4–1	2–0	0–0	1–2	1–0	1–0	3–0	1–0	5–1	0–1	0–3	—	2–3
Worthing	4–0	1–1	2–0	2–0	2–2	7–2	3–2	3–1	2–1	2–0	0–0	5–0	3–0	4–0	5–0	1–1	0–0	3–3	2–0	4–1	0–1	3–1	1–1	—

Source: National League South Results Grid
Legend: Blue = home team win; Yellow = draw; Red = away team win.
For upcoming matches, an "a" indicates there is an article about the rivalry between the two participants.

=== Season statistics ===
As of 18 April 2026

=== Top goalscorers ===
Rank	Player	Club	Goals
1	(England) Brad Dolaghan	Worthing	23
2	(Colombia) Angelo Balanta	Hornchurch	21
3	(Montserrat) Lyle Taylor	Chelmsford City	20
4	(England) Louis Britton	Weston-super-Mare	19
5	(Poland) Wiktor Makowski	Slough Town; Worthing	17
6	(England) Dominic Samuel	Ebbsfleet United	16
6	(England) Josh Umerah	Maidenhead United	16
6	(Scotland) Jordan Young	Torquay United	16

=== Hat-tricks ===
Player	For	Against	Result	Date
(England) Brad Dolaghan	Worthing	AFC Totton	4–1	11 November 2025
(England) Louis Dennis	Torquay United	Eastbourne Borough	7–0	22 November 2025
(Jamaica) Lamar Reynolds	Enfield Town	Farnborough	5–1	22 November 2025
(England) Pemi Aderoju^{4}	Eastbourne Borough	Hampton & Richmond Borough	6–0	29 November 2025
(England) Andy Carroll	Dagenham & Redbridge	AFC Totton	0–5	29 November 2025
(England) Charlie Carter	Dorking Wanderers	Eastbourne Borough	4–2	6 December 2025
(England) Luke Coulson	Weston-super-Mare	Farnborough	4–1	3 January 2026
(England) Riley Court	Maidstone United	Enfield Town	8–0	24 February 2026
(England) Kai Yearn^{4}	Chesham United	Maidstone United	4–2	21 March 2026
(England) Stanley Leech	Dagenham & Redbridge	Hampton & Richmond Borough	3–1	28 March 2026
(England) Dylan Morgan	Torquay United	Bath City	4–1	6 April 2026
(England) Scott Wilson	Bath City	Chesham United	4–2	11 April 2026

=== Monthly awards ===
Each month the Enterprise National League announces their official Player of the Month and Manager of the Month.

Month	Manager of the Month		Player of the Month		Reference
August	(Republic of Ireland) Daryl McMahon	Hornchurch	(England) Louis Britton	Weston-super-Mare	
September	(England) Scott Bartlett	Weston-super-Mare	(England) Max Harris	Weston-super-Mare	
October	(England) Dominic Di Paola	Horsham	(England) John Gilbert	Maidstone United	
November	(England) Adam Hinshelwood	Worthing	(England) Brad Dolaghan	Worthing	
December	(England) Josh Wright	Ebbsfleet United	(England) Charlie Carter	Dorking Wanderers	
January	(England) Paul Wotton	Torquay United	(Colombia) Angelo Balanta	Hornchurch	
February	(England) Marc White	Dorking Wanderers	(Montserrat) Lyle Taylor	Chelmsford City	
March	(England) Lee Allinson	Hemel Hempstead Town	(England) Teddy Jenks	Worthing	
April	(England) Adam Hinshelwood	Worthing	(Colombia) Ángelo Balanta	Hornchurch	

=== Annual awards ===
Award	Winner	Club	Ref.
Player of the Season	(Colombia) Ángelo Balanta	Hornchurch	
Young Player of the Season	(Poland) Wiktor Makowski	Worthing	
Manager of the Season	(England) Adam Hinshelwood	Worthing	

National League South Team of the Season

Pos.	Player	Club	Ref.
GK	(England) Arthur Nasta	Hornchurch	
CB	(Scotland) Brennan Camp	Dorking Wanderers	
CB	(England) Joe Cook	Worthing	
CB	(England) Joel Colbran	Worthing	
RM	(England) Razzaq Coleman De-Graft	Worthing	
CM	(England) Charlie Carter	Dorking Wanderers	
CM	(Scotland) Jordan Young	Torquay United	
LM	(Colombia) Ángelo Balanta	Hornchurch	
CF	(Poland) Wiktor Makowski	Worthing	
CF	(England) Brad Dolaghan	Worthing	
CF	(Montserrat) Lyle Taylor	Chelmsford City	

== See also ==
- 2025–26 Premier League
- 2025–26 EFL Championship
- 2025–26 EFL League One
- 2025–26 EFL League Two
- 2025–26 EFL Cup
- 2025–26 FA Cup
- 2025–26 EFL Trophy
- 2025–26 Isthmian League Premier
- 2025–26 Northern Premier League Premier
- 2025–26 Southern League Premier Central
