= Ricardo Rees =

Welsh footballer

Personal information
- Full name: Ricardo Estaban Rees
- Date of birth: 29 December 1999 (age 26)
- Place of birth: Newport, Wales
- Position: Striker

Team information
- Current team: Forest Green Rovers
- Number: 10

Youth career
- 2016–2020: Bristol City

Senior career*
Years	Team	Apps	(Gls)
2018–2020	Bristol City	0	(0)
2018	→ Bath City (loan)	1	(0)
2019	→ Salisbury (loan)	1	(0)
2020–2022	Yate Town	39	(5)
2022–2025	Merthyr Town	147	(112)
2025–	Forest Green Rovers	21	(9)
- * Club domestic league appearances and goals as of 07:01, 16 September 2026 (UTC)

Ricardo Estaban Rees (born 29 December 1999) is a Welsh professional footballer who plays as a striker for National League club Forest Green Rovers.

== Career ==
=== Early career ===
Rees started his career with Cardiff City, before moving on to Bristol City, joining them in 2016 after winning a scholarship. In April 2018, he was offered professional terms with the club. On 18 October 2018, Rees joined National League South club Bath City on a one-month youth loan. In October 2019, he joined Southern League Premier Division South club Salisbury on a one-month loan. He was released by Bristol City in summer 2020, having never made a professional appearance. He joined Southern League Premier Division South club Yate Town in October 2020.

=== Merthyr Town ===
In June 2022, Rees joined Southern League Premier Division South club Merthyr Town. He was part of the Merthyr team that reached the FA Cup first round for the first time since 2005 in November 2022. In April 2023, he signed a one-year contract extension with the club. In the final match of the 2023–24 season, Rees scored five goals in a 7–1 win over Harrow Borough as The Martyrs missed out on a play-off spot. He committed his future to the club during the close season despite interest higher up the English football pyramid.

He was top goalscorer for Merthyr in his first three seasons, including scoring 33 league goals as the club won the Southern League Premier Division South title and earned promotion to the National League North for the first time since their reformation in 2010. He scored his 100th goal for the club on 6 September 2025, the first of two goals he would score in a 2–0 home league win against Worksop Town.

=== Forest Green Rovers ===
On 31 December 2025, Rees joined National League club Forest Green Rovers for an undisclosed fee. He scored twice on his debut in a 2–1 league win against FC Halifax Town on 3 January 2026. He was sent off for a second bookable offence on his second appearance for the club in a 1–1 league draw away against Sutton United.

== Personal life ==
Rees attended Cwmcarn High School.

== Career statistics ==
As of match played 15 September 2026

Appearances and goals by club, season and competition
Club	Season	League			FA Cup		League cup (Note: Includes EFL Cup, Welsh League Cup)		Other		Total	
Club	Season	Division	Apps	Goals	Apps	Goals	Apps	Goals	Apps	Goals	Apps	Goals
Bristol City	2018–19	Championship	0	0	0	0	0	0	0	0	0	0
Bristol City	2019–20	Championship	0	0	0	0	0	0	0	0	0	0
Bristol City	Total		0	0	0	0	0	0	0	0	0	0
Bath City (loan)	2018–19	National League South	1	0	0	0	—		1 (Note: Appearance in Somerset Premier Cup)	0	2	0
Salisbury (loan)	2019–20	SL Premier Division South	1	0	—		—		2 (Note: Appearance(s) in FA Trophy)	0	3	0
Yate Town	2020–21	SL Premier Division South	5	0	0	0	—		0	0	5	0
Yate Town	2021–22	SL Premier Division South	34	5	6	0	—		5 (Note: One appearance in Southern League Cup; four appearances, two goals in Gloucestershire Senior Cup)	2	45	7
Yate Town	Total		39	5	6	0	0	0	5	2	50	7
Merthyr Town	2022–23	SL Premier Division South	42	19	6	2	—		1	0	49	21
Merthyr Town	2023–24	SL Premier Division South	42	35	4	2	—		2	1	48	38
Merthyr Town	2024–25	SL Premier Division South	39	33	1	1	1	1	1	0	42	35
Merthyr Town	2025–26	National League North	24	25	2	0	—		1	1	27	26
Merthyr Town	Total		147	112	13	5	1	1	5	2	166	120
Forest Green Rovers	2025–26	National League	13	6	—		—		1 (Note: Appearance in National League play-offs)	0	14	6
Forest Green Rovers	2026–27	National League	8	3	0	0	—		0	0	8	3
Forest Green Rovers	Total		21	9	0	0	—		1	0	22	9
Career total			207	125	19	5	1	1	14	4	241	135

== Honours ==
Bristol City

- Gloucestershire Senior Cup: 2017–18

Merthyr Town

- Southern League Premier Division South: 2024–25

Yate Town

- Gloucestershire Senior Cup: 2021–22
