= Solihull Moors F.C. =

English football club in the West Midlands

Coordinates: 52°26′19.99″N 1°45′26.07″W

Solihull Moors
- Full name: Solihull Moors Football Club
- Nickname: The Moors
- Founded: 10 July 2007; 19 years ago
- Ground: Damson Park
- Capacity: 5,500
- Chairman: Darryl Eales
- Head coach: Chris Millington
- League: National League
- 2025–26: National League, 14th of 24
- Website: solihullmoorsfc.co.uk
| Home colours | Away colours |

Solihull Moors Football Club is a professional association football club based in Solihull, England. The club currently competes in the National League, the fifth level of the English football league system, after achieving promotion from the National League North in the 2015–16 season.

The club was founded in 2007 by the merger of Moor Green (founded in 1901) and Solihull Borough (founded in 1953). The Moors entered the Conference North, the sixth tier of English football in 2007 where they remained until their promotion in 2016 under Marcus Bignot. After avoiding relegation in 2016–17 and 2017–18, the Moors narrowly missed out on promotion to League Two for the first time ever by finishing in third place before losing the play-off final to Grimsby Town, then once again losing the 2024 play-off final to Bromley. They also reached the FA Trophy final that season, but lost to Gateshead. Solihull Moors play their home matches at Damson Park.

== History ==
=== Formation and early years ===
On 10 July 2007, the club was formally announced as being merged and details of the new club logo and kits for the forthcoming season were released. In one of their first games Solihull Moors beat Birmingham City reserves. This fixture happened annually as part of an agreement which allowed Birmingham to play their reserve games at Solihull's ground. With the overhaul of reserve football in England, Birmingham City's development squads now play their fixtures at their club's training facilities rather than at Solihull Moors. The Birmingham City Women's team of the FA Women's Championship have played at the ground since 2014.

In November 2007, the club announced a partnership with National Division One rugby union club Pertemps Bees. The deal was intended to see the two clubs share the Damson Park facilities as well as the formation of community and coaching projects for Solihull. This was finally made official in 2010. The groundsharing arrangement came to an end in 2012, as Bees dropped into the fourth tier of English Rugby Union.

Throughout the 2007–08 Conference North campaign, then-manager Bob Faulkner kept much of the same squad that had represented Moor Green the previous season, with some summer additions from elsewhere. No Solihull Borough players were retained. Solihull Moors' first ever league goal was an equaliser scored from range by Darren Middleton, in a game that also saw Moors score their first ever league point, a 1–1 home draw with Barrow in their first ever competitive game. Moors had to wait two further weeks for a first ever competitive win, beating Gainsborough Trinity 3–1 at home. The club finished their first ever season in seventeenth position in the Conference North, securing survival with a win away at Blyth Spartans in April 2008. In their first FA Cup campaign, Solihull Moors reached the Fourth Qualifying Round before being dispatched 5–0 by Rushden & Diamonds, then of the Football Conference.

A number of changes were made to the Solihull Moors squad ahead of the 2008–09 season, with 8 summer signings made. Progress for the first team was slight, however, with the Moors managing sixteenth place in the league. The youth side, in contrast, made enormous strides, finishing as Midland Floodlit Youth League champions, and reaching the second round of the FA Youth Cup, before losing a close tie 2–0 to the academy side of professional club Tranmere Rovers. The cup run saw Solihull beat Wellington 18–0 during qualification. Five of that season's impressive youth crop signed for the senior squad during the close season.

A topsy-turvy 2009–10 season saw Moors go from relegation candidates in mid-September to mid-table by the new year, before slipping to a more customary seventeenth position by the end of the season. A seemingly revolving-door transfer policy reflected the difficulty of the season for Solihull Moors on the pitch.

On 7 February 2011, Moors manager Bob Faulkner died of cancer aged 60, after almost 25 years of managing Moor Green and Solihull Moors combined. Micky Moore, his assistant and also former Solihull Borough manager, was the initial replacement, however he resigned on 21 June 2011 to take up the full-time position of assistant manager at Mansfield Town. Moors finished seventh in the Conference North that season, then their best finish since the formation of the club. Under Faulkner and Moore's leadership, a squad that boasted the attacking prowess of Adam Cunnington and Matt Smith only narrowly missed out on the playoffs, following a late season collapse as momentum faded. At this point, extra seating was installed at Damson Park in anticipation of promotion challenges to come. The club also reached the final of the Birmingham Senior Cup for the first time during this season, losing 2–0 to West Bromwich Albion at The Hawthorns.

=== Marcus Bignot (2011–16) ===
Marcus Bignot was announced as the new manager of Solihull Moors on 27 June 2011. The ex-Crewe, Bristol Rovers, QPR and Millwall defender arrived at the club a week after the departure of Moore. With some players integral to the strong performance in the previous season having moved on, he inherited a youthful squad that lacked experience, which won none of its pre-season friendlies. The first seven games of the season ended in defeat. Using his connections in the game, Bignot brought in several new players and immediately results started to improve, so much so that by January the possibility of the playoffs seemed achievable. However, it proved impossible to maintain the momentum and by the end of the season the club finished just above the drop zone, in nineteenth place.

After a difficult first season under Bignot, the Moors continued their progress on the pitch towards challenging for promotion from the Conference North. The club finished ninth in 2013, followed by an eighth-place finish in 2014. 2014 also saw the introduction of a more robust club infrastructure at Solihull Moors, with the number of teams within the club's youth and junior structure rising from 3 to 27. Efforts to promote the club within the local community and increase attendances also slowly began to pay off at this point, with attendances up 80% on previous years. Moors had a more difficult 2014–15 season, managing only twelfth in the Conference North. However, 2014–15 also brought new opportunities for the club, with Birmingham City Ladies joining the Moors at Damson Park.

The Moors reached new heights under Bignot in 2015–16, winning the National League North title and securing promotion for the first time to the National League. The team finished the season with 85 points, winning the league comfortably with three games to spare. Promotion was secured on a night that Solihull were not even playing, as a defeat for North Ferriby United at Stalybridge Celtic mathematically confirmed their championship. Solihull also lifted the Birmingham Senior Cup for the first time–at the second time of asking–defeating Birmingham City 2–1 at St Andrew's.

Solihull Moors began their first National League campaign away at Sutton United on 6 August 2016, winning their first match at national level 3–1. Moors have since had their first ever televised game, winning 4–0 at home to Southport in front of the cameras on 4 October 2016. Solihull also booked their place in the first round of the FA Cup for the first time, after beating Kettering Town at home in the Fourth Qualifying Round. In the first round the team defeated Yeovil Town of League Two. In November, Bignot left to take the manager's job at Grimsby Town.

=== Relegation struggles (2016–18) ===
Moors appointed former Hednesford Town and Redditch United manager Liam McDonald, who guided the team to 16th in their maiden campaign in the fifth tier. The Moors were knocked out of the FA Cup in the second round by League Two side Luton Town, losing 6–2 having led 2–0 at half time. The Moors had a poor start to the 2017–18 season, resulting in McDonald leaving the club by mutual consent in October 2017. McDonald was replaced by Richard Money, who himself left the club later that month and was replaced by Mark Yates and his assistant Tim Flowers in November. Yates and Flowers pulled off a "great escape" with a run of 12 wins in 29 matches, resulting in the club rising from bottom of the league at Christmas, to 18th place by the end of the season, securing safety by six points. This achievement led to newly promoted League Two Macclesfield Town appointing Yates as their new manager, with Flowers taking the top job at Moors.

=== Established National League side (2018–) ===
In the 2018–19 National League season Solihull achieved their best ever league finish, coming second with a total of 86 points. Under Flowers, the Moors spent the entire season at or around the top of the league. They ultimately had to settle for second place and a place in the play-offs as they missed out on the title by three points. The Moors were knocked out of the play-offs by AFC Fylde in their semi-final at Damson Park, a second-minute goal from Danny Philliskirk proving the difference. The club also reached the second round of the FA Cup where they held Blackpool to a 0–0 draw in the televised home leg in front of a record crowd but lost the replay at Bloomfield Road 3–2, conceding an extra time penalty. In the following FA Cup campaign, the Moors were eliminated by League One side Rotherham United in the second round despite leading 3–0 in the 76th minute before conceding four late goals. Following disruption caused by the COVID-19 pandemic, the 2019–20 season was halted in March 2020 with Solihull finishing in 9th place. In 2021–22, Solihull finished third and went on to win their play-off semi-final, but lost the final after extra-time to Grimsby Town. In the 2023–24 season, they reached the play-off final again, this time losing on penalties to Bromley at Wembley Stadium. They also reached the FA Trophy final for the first time in their history that season, but again lost on penalties, this time to Gateshead after a 2–2 draw in the following week.

== Stadium ==
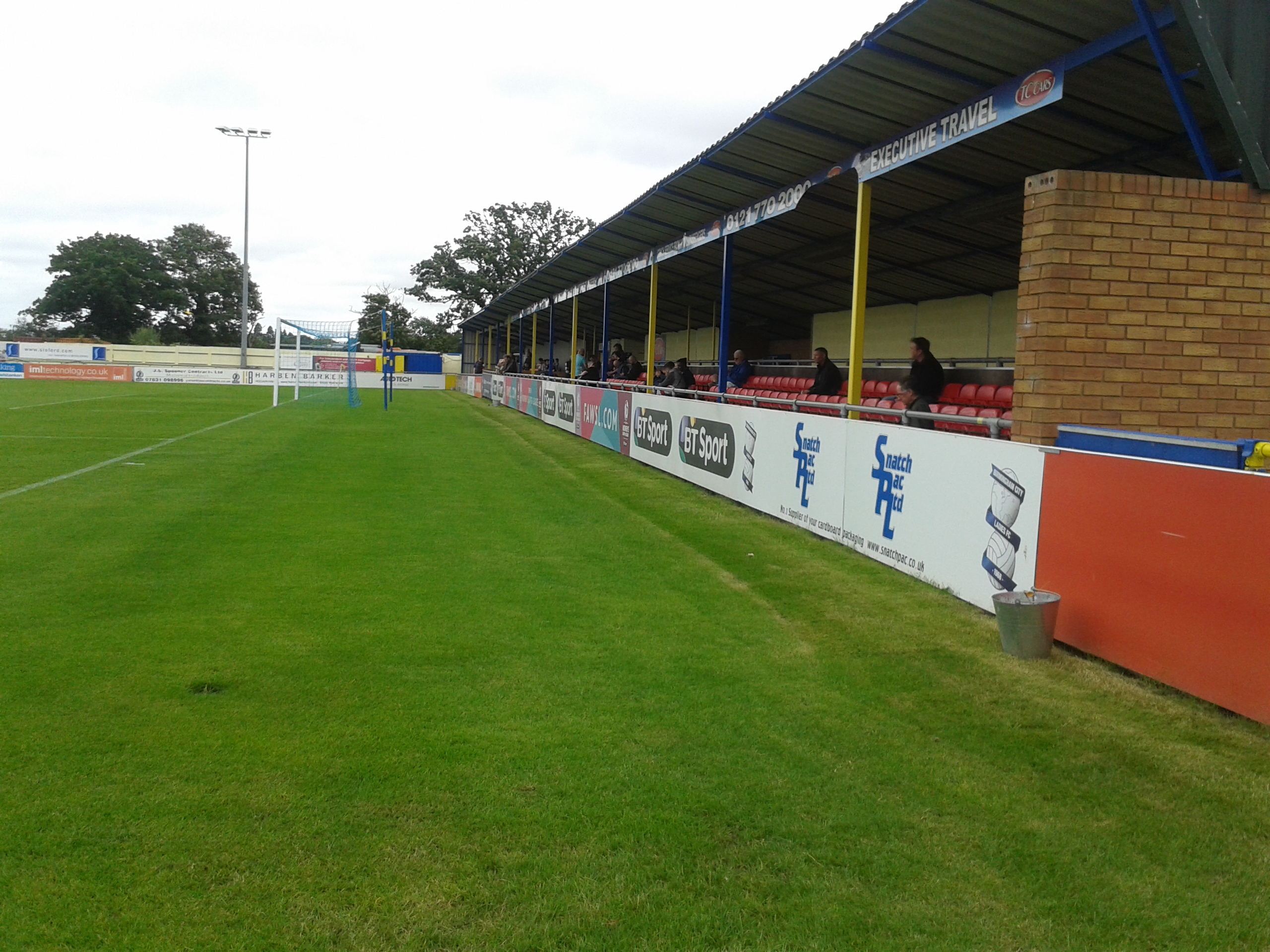
The stand behind the goal at Damson Park, July 2016

The Gold Exchange Stadium is situated on Damson Parkway in the Damsonwood area of town, about two miles (3 km) north of Solihull town centre, next to the Land Rover car plant.

The ground has two seated stands on either side of the pitch, and a covered stand of mixed seating and terracing at the south-eastern end of the ground, where all six entrances are located. The main stand lies on the south-western side of the ground and is connected to the clubhouse. The clubhouse contains two separate bar areas, and features a pie & chips shop on match days. The stand has seating at the bottom, and a balcony above reserved for sponsors and club officials. In 2019, boxes were added. Adjacent to the main stand is an area of hard standing with a raised toilet block. The steps leading to the entrances to the toilet facilities provide the only small area of terracing at that end of the ground and, when their side is attacking that end of the pitch, are popular with a group of Solihull Moors fans calling themselves "The Number 2 Crew".

Turnstiles open into the area next to the main stand, which also hosts the club shop and a hot food concession, the hard standing area on the opposite side of the pitch from the main stand, and into the other large stand. This area, known as "The Shed"—or sometimes also "The Tuck Shop End" to supporters—is currently officially titled the "Jerroms Stand" for sponsorship reasons. As its nickname suggests, it is home to the club tuck shop, which sells refreshments throughout the match but not hot food.

Much of the rest of the ground is undeveloped hard standing. Nearest to the turnstiles on the north-east side of the ground, is a toilet block and, sometimes, a second hot food stall, depending on segregation requirements and demand. Opposite the main stand is a single step of terracing that straddles the halfway line of the pitch. Further along that side, in the opposite direction from the Jerroms Stand, is a smaller area of covered seating that was erected in 2016. The furthest end of the ground from the turnstiles is all hard standing, and is known as the "Forest Stand" for sponsorship reasons.

Damson Park welcomed Birmingham City Ladies for the first time in the 2014–15 FA Women's Super League season, who also competed in the UEFA Women's Champions League. Birmingham City Ladies tend to play their WSL matches on Sundays, therefore avoiding clashes with Solihull Moors fixtures.

In April 2017, the stadium received Grade A status from the FA Ground Grading Technical Panel. The stadium seats 770 across its three different seated areas. On 7 October 2017, Richard Money took charge of his first game for Moors, with a then-record attendance of 2,658.

== Colours ==
Solihull Moors alternate their away kits each season to match the colours of the previous home kits of Moor Green and Solihull Borough.

== Players ==
=== Current squad ===
As of 7 November 2026

Note: Flags indicate national team as defined under FIFA eligibility rules; some limited exceptions apply. Players may hold more than one non-FIFA nationality.

| No. | Pos. | Nation | Player |
|---|---|---|---|
| 1 | GK | SCO | Max Metcalfe |
| 2 | DF | WAL | Justin Hanks |
| 4 | MF | ENG | Jamie Andrews |
| 5 | DF | IRL | Jevon Mills |
| 6 | DF | ENG | Alex Whitmore |
| 7 | MF | ENG | Joe Sbarra |
| 8 | MF | SCO | Scott High |
| 9 | FW | ENG | Jacob Wakeling |
| 11 | MF | ENG | Ben Worman |
| 12 | GK | ENG | Nathaniel Ford |
| 14 | MF | ENG | Henry Rylah (on loan from Charlton Athletic) |
| 15 | DF | ENG | Matty Carson |
| 17 | FW | ENG | Charlie Footes |
| 18 | DF | ENG | Ryan Woods (on loan from Oldham Athletic) |
| 20 | MF | ENG | Rio Shipston |
| 21 | DF | ENG | Oscar Rutherford |

| No. | Pos. | Nation | Player |
|---|---|---|---|
| 22 | FW | ENG | Ben Wodskou |
| 23 | DF | ENG | Tyrell Warren |
| 24 | DF | ENG | Carter Pinnington (on loan from West Bromwich Albion) |
| 25 | MF | KOS | Florent Hoti |
| 26 | DF | ENG | Tyler French |
| 27 | FW | ENG | Callum McFarlane |
| 28 | DF | ENG | Charlie Watts |
| 29 | DF | ENG | Junior Tiensia |
| 30 | MF | ENG | Flynn Coffey |
| 31 | FW | ENG | Ashton Lance-Pencheon |
| 32 | MF | ENG | Luca Hancock |
| 33 | DF | ENG | Chey Dunkley (on loan from Chesterfield) |
| 34 | FW | COD | Elias Kachunga |
| 35 | DF | ENG | Marvin Johnson |
| 38 | GK | ENG | Sam Johnson (on loan from FC Halifax Town) |
| 40 | FW | ENG | Elijah Hyde-Moore |

=== Out on loan ===
Note: Flags indicate national team as defined under FIFA eligibility rules; some limited exceptions apply. Players may hold more than one non-FIFA nationality.

| No. | Pos. | Nation | Player |
|---|---|---|---|
| 3 | DF | ENG | Cameron Green (at Chelmsford City until 5 December 2026) |
| 10 | FW | IRL | Conor Wilkinson (at Boreham Wood until end of 2026-27 season) |
| 19 | MF | ENG | Kian Ryley (at AFC Telford United until 14 November 2026) |

== Current management ==
| Position | Name |
|---|---|
Director of football
| Head coach | Chris Millington |
| First team coach | James Quinn |
| Goalkeeper coach | Kevin Poole |

== Seasons ==
| Year | League | Level | P | W | D | L | F | A | GD | Pts | Position | Leading league scorer | Goals | FA Cup | FA Trophy | Average attendance |
|---|---|---|---|---|---|---|---|---|---|---|---|---|---|---|---|---|
| 2007–08 | Conference North | 6 | 42 | 12 | 11 | 19 | 50 | 76 | −26 | 47 | 17th of 22 | Darren Middleton | 11 | QR4 | QR3 | 300 |
| 2008–09 | Conference North | 6 | 42 | 13 | 10 | 19 | 49 | 73 | −24 | 49 | 16th of 22 | Jake Edwards | 9 | QR2 | QR3 | 232 |
| 2009–10 | Conference North | 6 | 40 (Note: Farsley Celtic resigned from the league mid-season and their record was subsequently expunged, leaving 21 teams in the league.) | 11 | 9 | 20 | 47 | 58 | −11 | 42 | 17th of 21 | Jake Edwards | 7 | QR3 | QR3 | 248 |
| 2010–11 | Conference North | 6 | 42 | 18 | 10 | 12 | 66 | 49 | +17 | 64 | 7th of 22 | Ryan Beswick | 13 | QR3 | QR3 | 317 |
| 2011–12 | Conference North | 6 | 42 | 13 | 10 | 19 | 44 | 54 | −10 | 49 | 19th of 22 | Lee Morris | 6 | QR4 | R1 | 323 |
| 2012–13 | Conference North | 6 | 42 | 17 | 9 | 16 | 57 | 53 | +4 | 56 (Note: Solihull Moors deducted 3 points for fielding an ineligible player.) | 9th of 22 | Omar Bogle | 15 | QR3 | R2 | 239 |
| 2013–14 | Conference North | 6 | 42 | 17 | 14 | 11 | 63 | 52 | +11 | 65 | 8th of 22 | Omar Bogle | 18 | QR4 | QR3 | 430 |
| 2014–15 | Conference North | 6 | 42 | 16 | 7 | 19 | 68 | 63 | +5 | 55 | 12th of 22 | Omar Bogle | 29 | QR2 | R1 | 463 |
| 2015–16 | National League North | 6 | 42 | 25 | 10 | 7 | 84 | 48 | +36 | 85 | 1st of 22; Promoted as champions | Akwasi Asante | 17 | QR3 | R1 | 671 |
| 2016–17 | National League | 5 | 46 | 15 | 10 | 21 | 62 | 75 | −13 | 55 | 16th of 24 | Akwasi Asante | 11 | R2 | R1 | 1,009 |
| 2017–18 | National League | 5 | 46 | 14 | 12 | 20 | 49 | 60 | −11 | 54 | 18th of 24 | Oladapo Afolayan | 11 | R1 | R2 | 879 |
| 2018–19 | National League | 5 | 46 | 25 | 11 | 10 | 73 | 43 | +30 | 86 | 2nd of 24 | Adi Yussuf | 14 | R2 | QF | 1,381 |
| 2019–20 | National League | 5 | 38 | 15 | 10 | 13 | 48 | 37 | +11 | 55 | 9th of 24 (Note: Season was ended early due to the COVID-19 pandemic with final positions being determined on a points-per-game (PPG) basis. Solihull Moors' PPG was 1.45.) | Paul McCallum | 10 | R2 | R1 | 1,531 |
| 2020–21 | National League | 5 | 42 | 19 | 7 | 16 | 58 | 48 | +10 | 64 | 11th of 23 | James Ball | 9 | R2 | R4 | N/A |
| 2021–22 | National League | 5 | 44 | 25 | 12 | 7 | 83 | 45 | +38 | 87 | 3rd of 23 | Andrew Dallas | 19 | R1 | QF | 1,952 |
| 2022–23 | National League | 5 | 46 | 15 | 13 | 18 | 62 | 66 | -4 | 58 | 15th of 24 | Andrew Dallas | 13 | R1 | R4 | 1,689 |
| 2023–24 | National League | 5 | 46 | 21 | 13 | 12 | 71 | 62 | +9 | 76 | 5th of 24 | Josh Kelly | 13 | R1 | RU | |
| 2024–25 | National League | 5 | 46 | 16 | 10 | 20 | 61 | 67 | -6 | 58 | 14th of 24 | Jack Stevens | 13 | R2 | R3 | |

== Honours ==
League

- National League North (level 6)
  - Champions: 2015–16

Cup

- FA Trophy
  - Runners-up: 2023–24
- Birmingham Senior Cup
  - Winners: 2015–16

== Records ==
- Best FA Cup performance: Second Round, 2016–17, 2018–19, 2019–20, 2020–21, 2024–25
- Best FA Trophy performance: Runners-up, 2023–24
- Best Conference League Cup performance: Northern Section - Second Round, 2008–09; Group stage, 2024–25
- Best Birmingham Senior Cup performance: Winners, 2015–16
- Best Scottish Challenge Cup performance: Fourth Round, 2019–20
- Best league performance: 2nd, National League, 2018–19
- Worst league performance: 19th, Conference North 2011–12
- Biggest league defeat: 9–0 vs. Tranmere Rovers, 8 April 2017
- Biggest league win: 7–1 vs. Tamworth, 26 December 2025
- Biggest cup defeat: 5–0 vs. Rushden & Diamonds, 27 October 2007
- Biggest cup win: 4–0 vs. Worksop Town, 12 October 2013
- Record attendance: 4,026 vs. Chesterfield, 29 May 2022

== See also ==
- Category:Solihull Moors F.C. players
