= 2023 FA Trophy final =

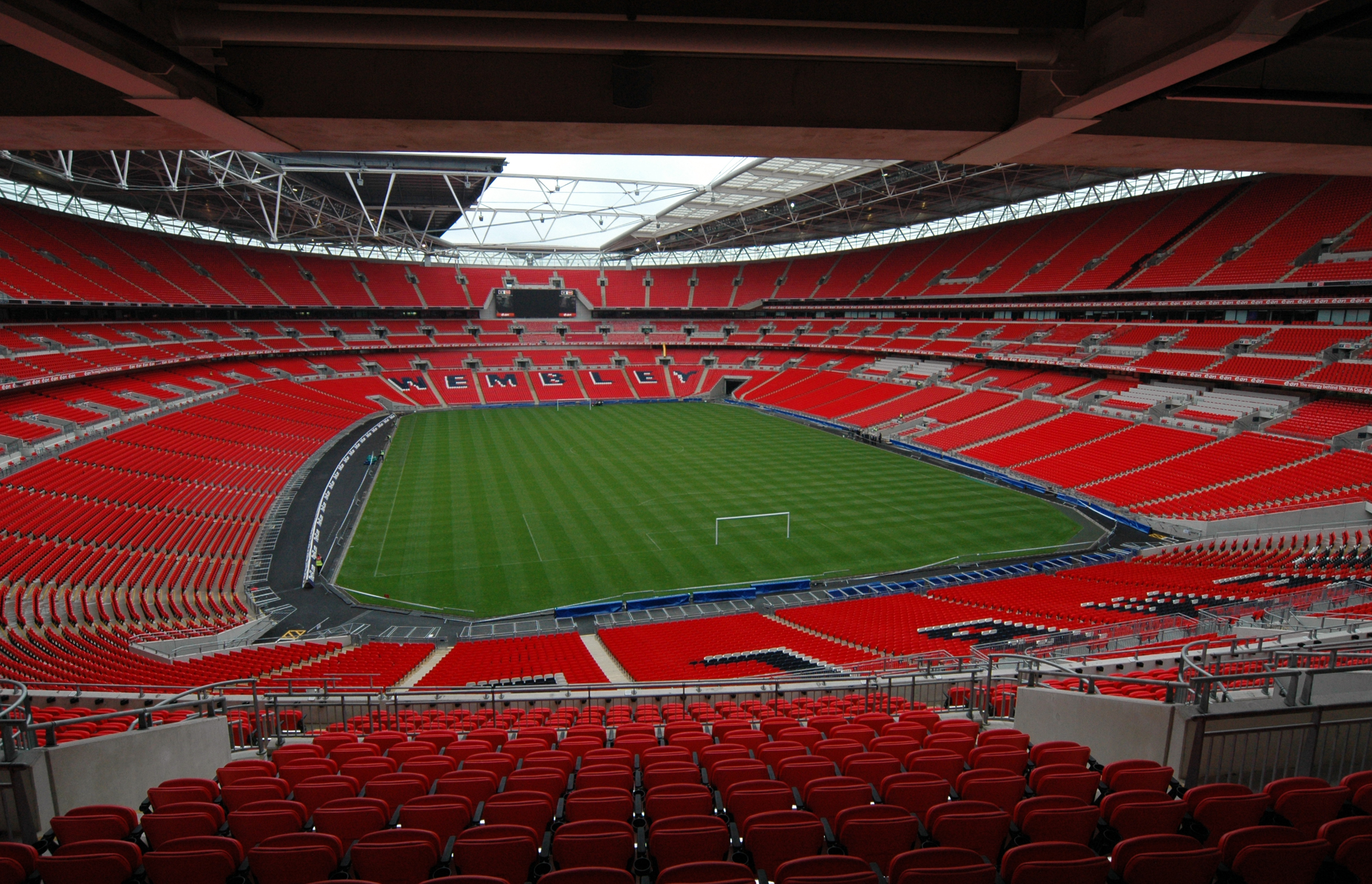
- Wembley Stadium hosted the final
- Event: 2022–23 FA Trophy
FC Halifax Town	Gateshead
1	0
- Date: 21 May 2023
- Venue: Wembley Stadium, London
- Referee: Darren England
- Attendance: 27,374

The 2023 FA Trophy final was an association football match played at Wembley Stadium, London, on 21 May 2023. It was contested between FC Halifax Town and Gateshead. It was Halifax's second final following their victory in 2016 which was their only previous visit to the national stadium, and Gateshead's first FA Trophy final and first visit to Wembley since 2014. Halifax defeated Gateshead 1–0 to win their second title.

FC Halifax Town defeated Guiseley, Harrow Borough, Maidenhead United, Aldershot Town, and Altrincham en route to the final. Gateshead defeated Gloucester City, Oldham Athletic, Banbury United, Farsley Celtic and Barnet en route to the final.

As part of Non-League Finals Day, the final of the FA Vase was played on the same day at the same venue. Both matches were televised in the UK on BT Sport.

== Route to the Final ==
=== FC Halifax Town ===
20 December 2022 3R	Guiseley	0–1	FC Halifax Town	Guiseley
19:45 GMT		Report	Arthur 19'	Stadium: Nethermoor Park; Attendance: 682

31 January 2023 4R	Harrow Borough	2–2 (5–6 p)	FC Halifax Town	Harrow
19:45 GMT	Moore 66', 90+4'	Report	Harker 44', 86'	Stadium: Earlsmead Stadium; Attendance: 293
	Penalties
	Leonard (penalty scored); Adenola (penalty missed); Biler (penalty scored); Moore (penalty scored); Assidjo (penalty scored); Williams (penalty scored); Bloom (penalty missed)		Senior (penalty missed); Harker (penalty scored); Dieseruvwe (penalty scored); Alli (penalty scored); Clarke (penalty scored); Stott (penalty scored); Keane (penalty scored)

11 February 2023 5R	Maidenhead United	0–0 (4–5 p)	FC Halifax Town	Maidenhead
15:00 GMT		Report		Stadium: York Road
	Penalties
	De Havilland (penalty scored); Barratt (penalty scored); Ferdinand (penalty scored); Nathaniel-George (penalty scored); McCoulsky (penalty missed)		Dieseruvwe (penalty scored); Harker (penalty scored); Stott (penalty scored); Alli (penalty scored); Slew (penalty scored)

11 March 2023 QF	Aldershot Town	0–2	FC Halifax Town	Aldershot
15:00 GMT		Report	Alli 12'; Gilmour 89'	Stadium: Recreation Ground; Attendance: 2,108

1 April 2023 SF	Altrincham	1–1 (2–3 p)	FC Halifax Town	Altrincham
15:00 BST	Hulme 45'	Report	Alli 90+5'	Stadium: Moss Lane; Attendance: 4,771
	Penalties
	Osborne (penalty scored); Hugill (penalty scored); Jones (penalty missed); Oyedele (penalty missed); Sinclair (penalty missed)		Senior (penalty missed); Summerfield (penalty scored); Stott (penalty scored); Dieseruvwe (penalty scored)

=== Gateshead ===
20 December 2022 3R	Gateshead	5–1	Gloucester City	Gateshead
19:45 GMT	Bailey 20', 26'; Ward 37'; Jarvis 42'; Elliott 65'	Report	Obadeyi 78'	Stadium: Gateshead International Stadium; Attendance: 253

14 January 2023 4R	Oldham Athletic	1–3	Gateshead	Oldham
15:00 GMT	Clarke 35' (red card) 87'	Report	Conteh 13'; Tinkler 86'; Olley 89'	Stadium: Boundary Park; Attendance: 2,228
Note: Tie was switched due to floodlight maintenance at Gateshead International Stadium

11 February 2023 5R	Banbury United	0–1	Gateshead	Banbury
15:00 GMT	Williams (red card) 90+6'	Report	Harris 12'; Magnay (red card) 90+6'	Stadium: Spencer Stadium; Attendance: 840

11 March 2023 QF	Gateshead	0–0 (4–2 p)	Farsley Celtic	Gateshead
15:00 GMT		Report		Stadium: Gateshead International Stadium; Attendance: 1,119
	Penalties
	Campbell (penalty scored); Martin (penalty missed); Ward (penalty scored); Storey (penalty scored); Conteh (penalty scored)		Mulhern (penalty scored); Clayton (penalty missed); Johnson (penalty missed); Scales (penalty scored)

1 April 2023 SF	Gateshead	3–3 (4–1 p)	Barnet	Gateshead
15:00 BST	Campbell 4'; Storey 24'; Olley 37'	Report	Fernandez 40'; Pritchard 80', 90+12'	Stadium: Gateshead International Stadium; Attendance: 2,897
	Penalties
	Campbell (penalty scored); Ward (penalty scored); Olley (penalty scored); Storey (penalty scored)		Pritchard (penalty scored); Kabamba (penalty missed); De Havilland (penalty missed)

== Match ==
=== Details ===
21 May 2023
16:15 BST

FC Halifax Town	1–0	Gateshead
Cooke 44'	Report

Wembley Stadium, London
Attendance: 27,374
Referee: Darren England

GK	1	(England) Sam Johnson
RB	2	(United States) Tylor Golden
CB	5	(England) Jesse Debrah	(substituted off) 62'
CB	6	(England) Jamie Stott
CB	3	(England) Jack Senior (c)
LB	18	(Belize) Angelo Cappello	(substituted off) 73'
CM	14	(England) Jack Hunter
CM	20	(England) Harvey Gilmour
AM	19	(England) Jamie Cooke	(substituted off) 90'
AM	21	(Republic of Ireland) Millenic Alli
CF	17	(England) Rob Harker
Substitutes:
DF	15	(England) Tom Clarke
DF	39	(England) Frankie Sinfield
MF	4	(England) Luke Summerfield	(substituted on) 62'
MF	10	(England) Matt Warburton	(substituted on) 73'
MF	37	(England) Ted Lavelle
FW	28	(England) Max Wright	(substituted on) 90'
FW	29	(England) Fidel O'Rourke
Manager:
(England) Chris Millington

GK	31	(England) James Montgomery
RB	2	(England) Robbie Tinkler
CB	5	(England) Kenton Richardson (substituted off) 82'
CB	6	(England) Louis Storey
LB	32	(Northern Ireland) Carl Magnay
CM	42	(Sierra Leone) Kamil Conteh
CM	8	(England) Owen Bailey
CM	10	(England) Greg Olley (c)
FW	11	(England) Adam Campbell
FW	15	(England) Aaron Martin (substituted off) 84'
FW	12	(England) Dan Ward
Substitutes:
GK	1	(England) Filip Marschall
GK	45	(Italy) Mauro Asikaogu
MF	38	(England) Dylan Archer
MF	40	(England) Ben Franklin
FW	19	(England) Will Harris (substituted on) 82'
FW	27	(England) Lewis Knight
FW	39	(England) Oli Thompson (substituted on) 84'
Manager:
(England) Mike Williamson
