= Carl Magnay =

British footballer (born 1989)

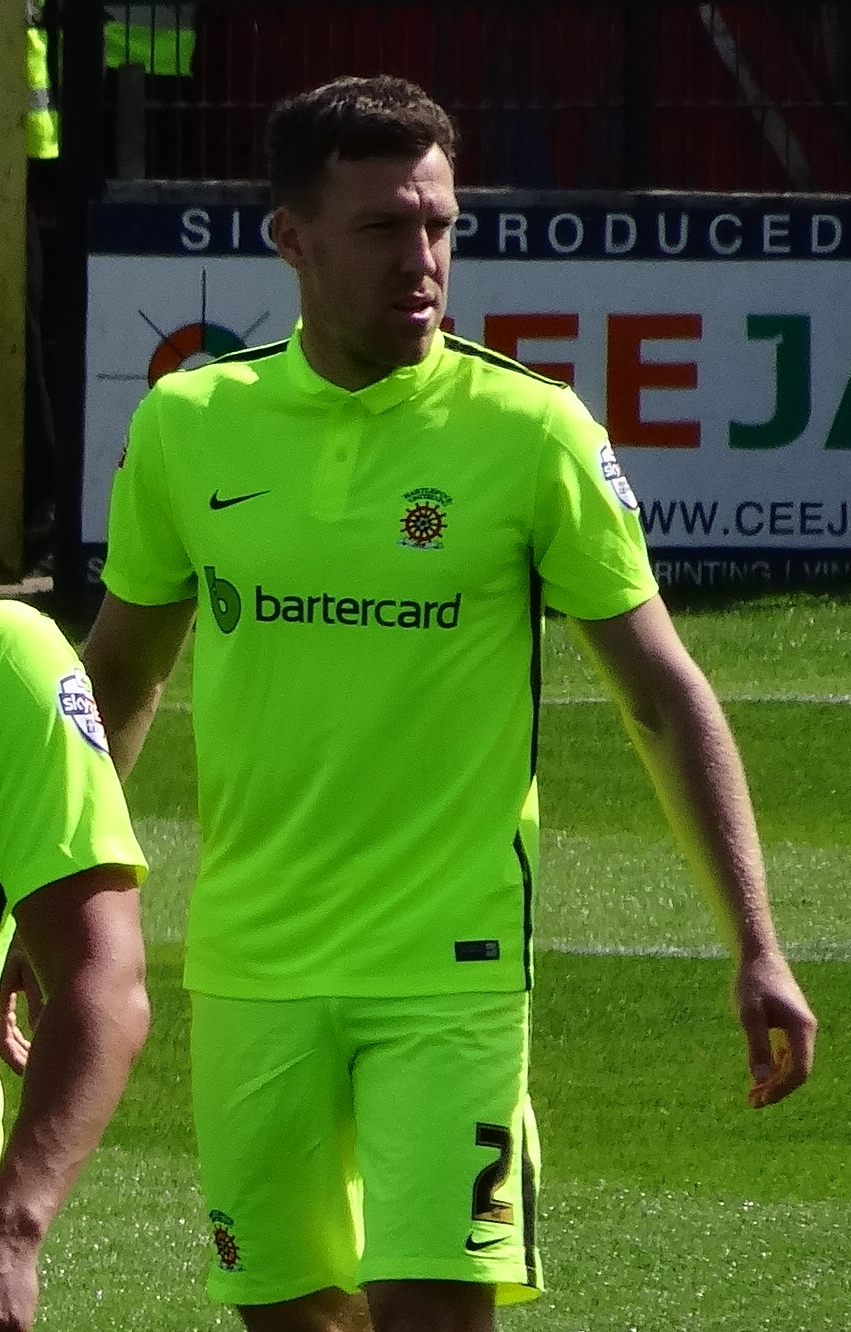
- Magnay playing for Hartlepool United in 2015

Personal information
- Full name: Carl Ronald Joseph Magnay
- Date of birth: 20 January 1989 (age 37)
- Place of birth: Gateshead, England
- Position: Full back

Team information
- Current team: Rochdale (assistant manager)

Youth career
- Leeds United
- Birtley Town
- Esh Winning
- 2007–2009: Chelsea

Senior career*
Years	Team	Apps	(Gls)
2009–2011	Chelsea	0	(0)
2009	→ Milton Keynes Dons (loan)	1	(0)
2009	→ Northampton Town (loan)	1	(0)
2012–2014	Gateshead	67	(3)
2014–2015	Grimsby Town	42	(1)
2015–2019	Hartlepool United	110	(4)
2019–2021	Spennymoor Town	38	(0)
2022–2023	Gateshead	38	(1)
Total		297	(9)

International career
2009	Northern Ireland U21	1	(0)

Managerial career
- 2024–2025: Gateshead
- * Club domestic league appearances and goals

Carl Ronald Joseph Magnay (born 20 January 1989) is a former professional footballer who played as a defender. He is the assistant manager at EFL League Two side Rochdale.

Born in Gateshead, Magnay joined Chelsea in 2007. After loan spells with Milton Keynes Dons and Northampton Town, he departed Chelsea and joined his home town club Gateshead. After three seasons with Gateshead, he spent one season with Grimsby Town where he won the club's Player of the Season award. In 2015, he joined League Two club Hartlepool United. Magnay became club captain in his third season with Hartlepool before departing at the end of his fourth season. He subsequently joined non-League Spennymoor Town in 2019. After three seasons with Spennymoor, he rejoined Gateshead. In this spell, Gateshead earned promotion from the National League North as champions. He retired in 2023.

Magnay has also represented Northern Ireland at under-21 level, earning one cap.

== Career ==
=== Chelsea ===
Born in Gateshead, Tyne and Wear, Magnay was the winner of the second series of the Sky One talent search Football Icon. Prior to this Magnay was part of Leeds United's academy and also played part-time for Birtley Town and Esh Winning. Magnay's father was the secretary at Birtley Town and he received a phone call from Sky explaining that they were looking for players to take part. Magnay attended alongside his friend Mark Anderson. Before appearing on Football Icon, Magnay had been on trial with Middlesbrough. On 30 July 2007, ChelseaTV Online conducted an interview with Magnay, where it was revealed he had signed professional forms with the club.

In January 2009 he was loaned to League One team Milton Keynes Dons. He made his debut for the Dons on 31 January against Cheltenham Town. He made only one other appearance and in total played 7 minutes for MK. On 9 March 2009 Magnay was signed by Northampton Town on a one-month loan deal. He made his debut in the 1–0 defeat at Millwall.

In pre-season ahead of the 2009–10 Premier League campaign, Magnay was a part of the Chelsea Reserves team that took part in a training ground brawl with United Arab Emirates side Al-Ahli.

In March 2010 Magnay suffered a serious injury in a reserve team game against Charlton Athletic, damaging his anterior cruciate ligament, medial collateral ligament and cracking his kneecap.

On 16 June 2011, it was announced that Magnay had been released by Chelsea having made no senior appearances in a spell plagued by injury. Also, Chelsea reserve team coach Steve Holland made this comment in an article which confirmed the departure of two other players: "Carl Magnay will remain at Chelsea for the rest of this year and he is well informed of how the club see him. He is another who had an awful run of injuries and we try to look after our players. Hopefully over the next six months we can help place him at a good level of football."

=== Gateshead ===
In January 2012, Magnay appeared on trial at Gateshead, playing for Gateshead's reserve side in a Durham Challenge Cup match against Norton & Stockton Ancients on 11 January and a Central League game against Hartlepool United Reserves on 25 January. On 27 January 2012, he signed for Gateshead on a contract until the end of the season. He made his debut on 6 March, as an 86th-minute substitute in a 2–0 win over Hayes & Yeading United. He agreed a new one-year contract with the club in May 2012 to cover the 2012–13 season. Magnay scored his first career goal on 29 January 2013 against Barrow in the FA Trophy. He scored his first league goal on 13 April 2013 against Hereford United. Magnay started in the 2014 Conference Premier play-off final against Cambridge United, a 2–1 defeat. After making 77 appearances for the club, Magnay was released at the end of the 2013–14 season.

=== Grimsby Town ===
On 15 July 2014, Magnay signed for Conference Premier side Grimsby Town on a one-year contract. On 26 April 2015, he picked up six awards including "Supporters Player of the Year" award, at the club's annual presentation.

=== Hartlepool United ===
On 1 June 2015, Magnay joined Hartlepool United after a successful spell at Grimsby where he helped his team finish third in the Conference Premier. On 5 September 2015, Magnay was accused of spitting at a spectator after receiving a red card in a defeat to Wycombe Wanderers. He was suspended by the FA for six matches and fined £750. Magnay made 33 league appearances in his first season for Hartlepool. He scored twice in a 3–3 draw at Crewe Alexandra. In September 2016, Magnay ruptured his anterior cruciate ligament in a match with Mansfield Town.

At the start of the 2017–18 season, he was named Hartlepool's captain by new boss Craig Harrison. In March 2018, Magnay made headlines when scored a goal from 40-yards for Hartlepool on live TV in a relegation battle against Barrow. Magnay signed a new one-year deal with the club at the end of the 2017–18 season.

Magnay was replaced by Andrew Davies as club captain at the start of the 2018–19 season by the club's new manager Matthew Bates. Bates said of the appointment: "Carl (Magnay) hasn't done anything wrong but I spoke to him during the summer and made it clear it was nothing against him but told him I was looking to bring in someone with more experience."

=== Spennymoor Town ===
On 16 July 2019, Spennymoor Town announced the signing of Magnay. Magnay stated that he switched to part-time football so that he could pursue coaching and scouting opportunities.

On 9 December 2021, Magnay departed Spennymoor by mutual consent. He made 42 appearances in all competitions for the Moors.

=== Return to Gateshead ===
On 7 January 2022, Magnay re-signed for National League North side Gateshead on a short-term contract until the end of the 2021–22 season making the switch back to full-time football. His first goal, in his second spell, came in a 2–2 draw against Chorley on 2 May 2022. The result meant that Gateshead had secured the National League North title. At the end of the season, Magnay signed a new one–year deal with the club.

Magnay played in the 2023 FA Trophy final for Gateshead at Wembley, but lost 1–0 to FC Halifax Town. On 11 July 2023, it was announced he had signed a new one–year contract with Gateshead.

On 28 November 2023, Magnay decided to retire from professional football following a long-term injury sustained in training. This decision came after he had sustained an anterior cruciate ligament injury in October 2023. Upon retiring he said: "It was difficult – it wasn't the way I wanted to finish my career, via an injury. It was difficult to process for a couple of weeks and took a while to sink in, purely because it was taken out of my hands. It was something that I was preparing for anyway, and thankfully it came at a time where I've transitioned straight into the coaching side of it."

== International career ==
Due to having Northern Irish grandparents, English-born Magnay was eligible to represent Northern Ireland or the Republic of Ireland. He made his international debut for the Northern Ireland U21 team on 11 August 2009, in an away friendly against Portugal's U-21 team.

== Coaching career ==
In January 2015, while earning his coaching badges, Magnay started coaching at Pro Player Football Academy. In September 2019, Magnay began working for his former club Chelsea as a youth talent scout in the north of England.

Following his retirement from football on 28 November 2023, he remained at Gateshead as a part of the coaching staff.

On 14 June 2024, Magnay joined his former manager Mike Williamson as a first-team coach at League Two club Milton Keynes Dons.

On 19 September 2024, Magnay once again followed Williamson, joining the coaching staff of Carlisle United.

In October 2024, Magnay took up his first managerial role when he was appointed manager at National League side Gateshead. After winning every league game in December 2024, Magnay won the league's Manager of the Month award. On 2 June 2025, Magnay resigned, after a disappointing end to the season; missing out on the play-offs by one point. Magnay was defended in the press by club captain Greg Olley with Olley criticising the club's ownership and stating that Magnay had not received enough support from the board. The following day after leaving Gateshead, he was appointed assistant manager of South Shields.

On 10 June 2026, Magnay left South Shields alongside manager Ian Watson to take up the role of assistant manager at newly promoted EFL League Two side Rochdale.

== Career statistics ==
=== Club ===
Appearances and goals by club, season and competition
Club	Season	League			FA Cup		League Cup		Other		Total	
Club	Season	Division	Apps	Goals	Apps	Goals	Apps	Goals	Apps	Goals	Apps	Goals
Chelsea	2007–08	Premier League	0	0	0	0	0	0	0	0	0	0
Chelsea	2008–09	Premier League	0	0	0	0	0	0	0	0	0	0
Chelsea	2009–10	Premier League	0	0	0	0	0	0	0	0	0	0
Chelsea	2010–11	Premier League	0	0	0	0	0	0	0	0	0	0
Chelsea	2011–12	Premier League	0	0	0	0	0	0	0	0	0	0
Chelsea	Total		0	0	0	0	0	0	0	0	0	0
Milton Keynes Dons (loan)	2008–09	League One	1	0	0	0	0	0	0	0	1	0
Northampton Town (loan)	2008–09	League One	1	0	0	0	0	0	0	0	1	0
Gateshead	2011–12	Conference Premier	4	0	0	0	0	0	0	0	4	0
Gateshead	2012–13	Conference Premier	33	1	1	0	0	0	2 (Note: Appearance(s) in FA Trophy)	1	36	2
Gateshead	2013–14	Conference Premier	30	2	2	0	0	0	5 (Note: Two appearances in FA Trophy, three appearances in Conference Premier play-offs)	0	37	2
Gateshead	Total		67	3	3	0	0	0	7	1	77	2
Grimsby Town	2014–15	Conference Premier	42	1	0	0	0	0	0	0	3	0
Hartlepool United	2015–16	League Two	33	1	2	0	2	0	0	0	37	1
Hartlepool United	2016–17	League Two	13	2	0	0	1	0	0	0	14	2
Hartlepool United	2017–18	National League	35	1	0	0	0	0	0	0	35	1
Hartlepool United	2018–19	National League	29	0	3	1	0	0	2	0	34	1
Hartlepool United	Total		110	4	5	1	3	0	2	0	120	5
Spennymoor Town	2019–20	National League North	23	0	1	0	0	0	0	0	24	0
Spennymoor Town	2020–21	National League North	3	0	0	0	0	0	2	0	5	0
Spennymoor Town	2021–22	National League North	12	0	0	0	0	0	1	0	13	0
Spennymoor Town	Total		38	0	1	0	0	0	3	0	42	0
Gateshead	2021–22	National League North	15	1	0	0	0	0	0	0	15	1
Gateshead	2022–23	National League	20	0	2	0	0	0	5	0	27	0
Gateshead	2023–24	National League	3	0	0	0	0	0	0	0	3	0
Gateshead	Total		38	1	2	0	0	0	5	0	45	1
Career total			297	9	11	1	3	0	17	1	328	11

== Honours ==
=== As a player ===
Gateshead

- National League North: 2021–22
- FA Trophy runner-up: 2022–23

Individual

- Grimsby Town Supporters' Player of the Year: 2014–15

=== As a manager ===
Individual

- National League Manager of the Month: December 2024
