= Jimmy Ball (football manager) =

English football manager

Personal information
- Full name: James Alan Ball
- Date of birth: 4th September 1975 (age 51)

Team information
- Current team: Torquay United (manager)

Youth career
- Exeter City
- Southampton

Senior career*
Years	Team	Apps	(Gls)
- BAT Sports

Managerial career
- 2021: Forest Green Rovers (interim)
- 2022–2026: AFC Totton
- 2026–: Torquay United
- * Club domestic league appearances and goals

James Alan Ball (born 1975) is an English football coach who is the manager of Torquay United. Previously Ball had been employed with Forest Green Rovers as an under-18 team coach and interim manager of the first team as well as the manager of AFC Totton.

== Playing career ==
Ball was a youth player at Exeter City and Southampton during his father's managerial stints at the clubs. Ball later played senior football for BAT Sports.

== Coaching career ==
Following his playing spell, Ball moved into coaching, coaching at Christchurch and Winchester City. In 2014, following coaching spells at Portsmouth and Irish club Shelbourne, Ball moved to the United States, to coach Puget Sound Gunners. Ball later returned to England, coaching in the academies at Blackburn Rovers and Stoke City.

On 11 April 2021, following the sacking of Mark Cooper and whilst working as the club's under-18 manager, Ball was appointed interim manager of Forest Green Rovers until the end of the 2020–21 season. After having narrowly missed out on promotion to League One through the playoffs, Rob Edwards was appointed head coach, and Ball went back to coach the under-18s team. He left the club with mutual consent in September 2021.

Ball was appointed first-team coach at League Two club Stevenage on 4 January 2022.

In March 2022, Ball was appointed as manager of Southern Football League side AFC Totton. In January 2024, he was linked to a return to former club Forest Green Rovers. The 2024–25 season saw the club promoted to the National League South for the first time in the club's history, defeating Gloucester City in the play-off final.

On 18 March 2026, Ball was appointed manager of fellow National League South club Torquay United.

== Personal life ==
Ball is the son of former 1966 World Cup winner Alan Ball Jr. and the grandson of Alan Ball Sr. All three family members have managed in the Football League.

== Managerial statistics ==
As of match played 15 August 2026

Managerial record by team and tenure
Team	From	To	Record				
Team	From	To	P	W	D	L	Win %
Forest Green Rovers	11 April 2021	27 May 2021	8	4	2	2	50.0
AFC Totton	22 March 2022	18 March 2026	204	115	46	43	56.4
Torquay United	18 March 2026	Present	12	7	2	3	58.3
Total			224	126	50	48	56.3

== Honours ==
AFC Totton

- Southern League Premier Division South play-offs: 2024–25
