= Chris Millington =

English football manager (born 1975)

Personal information
- Date of birth: 8 September 1975 (age 51)
- Place of birth: Manchester, England

Team information
- Current team: Solihull Moors

Managerial career
- Years: Team
- 2022–2025: FC Halifax Town
- 2025–: Solihull Moors

Chris Millington (born 8 September 1975) is an English football coach. He is the manager of National League club Solihull Moors.

== Coaching career ==
Millington played as a midfielder as a youngster, including a spell at Manchester City, but did not have a professional playing career. He then began his coaching career at Altrincham U18s before working at a number of clubs at both youth and first team level, including Curzon Ashton, Macclesfield and Stockport County.

He then worked with Pete Wild in the Oldham Athletic academy after meeting whilst studying together for their UEFA A License. Millington was then appointed his assistant during Wild's two caretaker spells of the first team.

In July 2019, Wild was named as the new first team manager of FC Halifax Town. The following month, Millington was announced as his assistant. The pair worked together at the West Yorkshire club for three seasons until Wild moved to manage League Two side Barrow in May 2022.

The day after Wild's departure, Millington was confirmed as his replacement as first team manager. In his first season with the Shaymen, he led them to an 11th placed league finish and victory in the 2023 FA Trophy final at Wembley Stadium.

Millington's second season as manager saw Halifax finish 7th in the league, qualifying for the play-offs. His side ultimately lost 4–2 in the quarter finals to eventual finalists Solihull Moors. They were eliminated at the same stage of the play-offs in the following season, losing 4–0 to Oldham Athletic. On 27 May 2025, following the defeat to Oldham, Millington resigned as manager of Halifax.

On 1 October 2025, Millington was appointed manager of fellow National League club Solihull Moors.

== Managerial statistics ==
As of match played 21 November 2026

Managerial record by team and tenure
Team	From	To	Record				
Team	From	To	P	W	D	L	Win %
FC Halifax Town	28 May 2022	27 May 2025	141	54	40	47	38.3
Solihull Moors	1 October 2025	Present	60	21	12	27	35.0
Total			201	75	52	74	37.3

== Honours ==
=== As a manager ===
FC Halifax Town

- FA Trophy: 2022–23
