= Cedric Main =

Dutch footballer (born 1997)

Personal information
- Full name: Cedric Julien Main
- Date of birth: 15 July 1997 (age 29)
- Place of birth: French Guiana
- Height: 1.80 m (5 ft 11 in)
- Position: Forward

Team information
- Current team: AFC Fylde
- Number: 19

Senior career*
Years	Team	Apps	(Gls)
–2018	Ajax Zaterdag		
2018–2020	La Nucía	9	(0)
2020	Almagro	9	(5)
2021	FC United of Manchester	15	(3)
2021–2022	South Shields	16	(2)
2022–2023	Blyth Spartans	39	(6)
2023–2024	York City	0	(0)
2023	→ Blyth Spartans (loan)	14	(7)
2024–2026	Darlington	98	(36)
2026–	AFC Fylde	0	(0)
- * Club domestic league appearances and goals as of 16:26, 9 May 2026 (UTC)

Cedric Julien Main (born 15 July 1997) is a Dutch footballer who plays as a forward for National League club AFC Fylde.

== Early life ==
Main started playing football at the age of eleven.

== Career ==
Main started his career with Dutch side Ajax Zaterdag. In 2018, he signed for Spanish side La Nucía. In 2020, he signed for Spanish side Almagro. In 2021, he signed for English side FC United of Manchester. After that, he signed for English side South Shields. In 2022, he signed for English side Blyth Spartans. He helped the club escape relegation. In 2023, he signed for English side York City. After that, he was sent on loan to English side Blyth Spartans. In 2024, he signed for English side Darlington. On 27 January 2024, he debuted for the club during a 2–0 win over Hereford. On 9 May 2026, it was announced that Cedric would leave Darlington to join AFC Fylde on a free transfer.

== Style of play ==
Main mainly operates as a striker. He is known for his speed and strength. He has been described as "boasts bright dribbling and creative statistics that suggest his ability to set up goals trumps his unpromising scoring record".

== Personal life ==
Main was born in French Guiana to Surinamese parents. He obtained a French passport.
