= FC Halifax Town =

Association football club in Halifax, England

- Full name: FC Halifax Town
- Nickname: The Shaymen
- Founded: 2008; 18 years ago
- Ground: The Shay
- Capacity: 10,401 (5,108 seated) (5,293 declared as safe standing capacity for North and South stands)
- Chairman: David Bosomworth
- Manager: John McGrath
- League: National League
- 2025–26: National League, 8th of 24
- Website: fchalifaxtown.com
Home colours	Away colours	Third colours

FC Halifax Town is a professional association football club based in Halifax, West Yorkshire, England. They currently compete in the National League, the fifth level of English football league system.

They replaced Halifax Town, which went into administration in the 2007–08 season. FC Halifax were initially placed in the Northern Premier League Division One North, the eighth tier of English football ahead of the 2008–09 season. Under manager Neil Aspin, the club won three promotions, reaching the top division of non-League football by 2013. FC Halifax won the FA Trophy in 2015–16 but were relegated to the National League North in the same season before returning to the National League immediately thanks to a play-off win against Chorley. FC Halifax also won the FA Trophy in the 2022–23 season. They play at The Shay.

== History ==
=== Formation ===
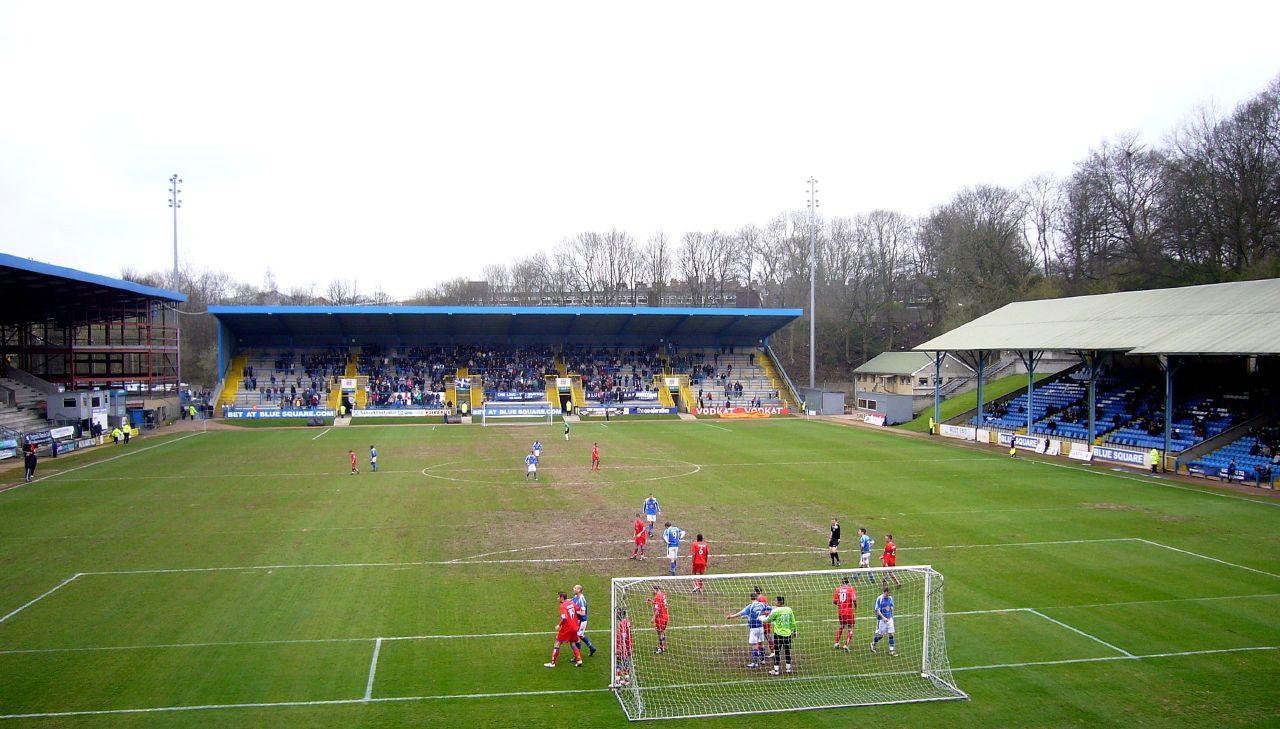
The Shay, the home ground of Halifax Town

Huge tax debts buried Halifax Town A.F.C. after almost 100 years as a football club. In May 2008, it was revealed that Halifax owed over £814,000 to Her Majesty's Revenue and Customs. It was originally thought the club owed the taxman around £500,000, which might have left scope for a deal. At a meeting of the FA, discussing the makeup of the football pyramid for the 2008–09 season, it was decided that FC Halifax Town would be placed in the Northern Premier League Division One North (the eighth tier of English football) despite various appeals.

=== Northern Premier League (2008–2011) ===
The club's first game under the new name FC Halifax Town was a friendly defeat against Tamworth on 19 July 2008. The Shaymen's first competitive match came in a 3–0 loss to Bamber Bridge. FC Halifax's first ever season was filled with inconsistency: ending outside the play-off positions in 8th place.

In April 2009, Neil Aspin was appointed as the new manager, which would prove to be an excellent appointment. His first season in charge was a successful one; winning the league with 100 points (scoring 108 goals in the process). Halifax reached the FA Cup 4th qualifying round that season: eventually losing to Wrexham in front of a record crowd of 2,843. The title was sealed with a 2–2 home draw against Clitheroe.

Halifax started the 2010–11 season in the Northern Premier League, (the 7th tier of English football). New-signing Jamie Vardy (who would later play for Leicester City and the England National Team) helped fire Halifax to back-to-back promotions to the Conference North as top scorer with 22 goals. Once again, Halifax would lose in the fourth qualifying round of the FA Cup to a fifth tier side; this time it would be a narrow defeat to Mansfield Town. On New Year's Day 2011, Town beat FC United of Manchester 4–1 at the Shay which attracted a crowd of 4,023, an attendance that at the time held the record crowd for the Northern Premier League. They finally won the title after winning 2–0 at Retford United and gained automatic promotion to the Conference North.

=== Conference North years (2011–2013) ===
Four games into the 2011-12 season, star-striker Jamie Vardy signed for Fleetwood Town. Vardy was replaced as Halifax's main striker by Lee Gregory (who would later play for Millwall and Stoke City in the Championship). Halifax had a sluggish start to their first ever season in the 6th tier. For the first ever time, Halifax reached the 1st round of the FA Cup: a televised home tie against League One leaders Charlton Athletic. The result was a 4–0 defeat in front of 4,601 supporters. The club rose from 13th at the start of the match to 3rd by the end of the season. Halifax lost in the play-offs to Gainsborough Trinity (3–2 on aggregate).

The 2012–13 season was the club's second consecutive season in the 6th tier. The season was defined by successful cup-runs and another promotion. In the FA Cup, Halifax took Conference Premier side Lincoln City to a replay in the 4th qualifying round. In the FA Trophy Halifax reached the quarter-finals of the tournament, eventually losing out to 5th tier side Dartford. Due to Town's cup-runs and postponements from poor weather caused a huge back-log in fixtures. By February, Halifax had ten games in hand on certain teams. Halifax had a difficult run at the end of the season (despite playing 12 games in 27 days), reaching the play-offs in 5th. In the play-off semi-final, Halifax won 3–1 (on aggregate) against local side Guiseley. The play-off final was won 1–0 against Brackley Town with a solitary goal by Lee Gregory.

=== National League years (2013–) ===
Chart of yearly table positions of Halifax Town in the football league.

The National League (5th tier) was the highest level that the newly formed FC Halifax Town side had played at since formation. Neil Aspin started the 2013–14 season by signing a two-year contract. Their first season in the 5th tier started with a disappointing 5–1 defeat to Cambridge United. Town's first win in the 5th tier was against Wrexham. From March onwards, the Shaymen won 9 of 10 matches (keeping 7 clean-sheets) Halifax finished their first season in the Conference play-off positions (the highest placed semi-professional team in the country). Halifax lost 2–1 to Cambridge United in the play-off semi-final, rounding off a sensational first season in the 5th tier.

During pre-season, Lee Gregory was sold for £250,000 to Millwall after being Halifax's top scorer for three consecutive seasons (scoring 18, 20 and 29 goals respectively). Halifax started the new season with five consecutive wins, placing the Shaymen at the top of the league. In the 1st round of the FA Cup, Halifax were drawn against old rivals Bradford City. The televised match attracted 8,042 spectators (FC Halifax Town's record attendance): which Town lost 2–1. Eventually, form dropped off in the league with too many draws (15), leaving Halifax Town in 9th place at the end of the season.

The Shaymen's third season in the National League was a poor one, culminating in relegation back to the 6th tier. Neil Aspin was sacked and replaced by Darren Kelly. Kelly oversaw disastrous results against Grimsby Town (7–0), Cheltenham Town (7–1) and Braintree Town (6–3). Kelly left the club by mutual agreement after 47 days in charge. Jim Harvey became caretaker manager, he turned the club's fortunes around but could not prevent Halifax's relegation back to the National League North following a draw against Macclesfield Town. Meanwhile, Halifax reached the 2016 FA Trophy final, defeating Grimsby Town 1–0 at Wembley Stadium.

Harvey was replaced by North Ferriby United manager Billy Heath. Town made an immediate return to the National League, finishing in 3rd place. Halifax met Salford City in the play-off semi-final, drawing 1–1 (winning 3–0 on penalties). In the play-off final, Halifax beat Chorley 2–1 after extra time in front of nearly 8,000 fans.

Halifax's return to the National League was largely uneventful. Despite mid-season doubts, Halifax were never in serious danger of relegation. Billy Heath was replaced by Jamie Fullarton mid-season who guided them to 16th place. For the second consecutive season, Halifax finished the season in 16th place. Halifax were top of the league at the end of August having just switched to a hybrid full-time model. The highlight of the season was an impressive win against League Two side Morecambe.

In 2018, it was announced that FC Halifax would become full-time. During pre-season, Jamie Fullarton was replaced with Pete Wild. This time though, the positive start to the season did not end like in previous seasons. By March, the COVID-19 pandemic forced the cancellation of the season. The final league position was decided on a points per game decision, meaning Halifax would end up in the play-off positions. However, the Shaymen lost 2–1 in the play-offs to Boreham Wood. Halifax finished the following season in 10th place – four points outside the play-offs. Due to the recent coronavirus pandemic, the vast majority of fixtures were played behind closed doors during 2020–21.

In the 2021–22 season, FC Halifax posted their highest ever league finish of 4th place, qualifying for the play-offs. In the play-off eliminator, they lost 2–1 at home to Chesterfield. At the end of the season, Pete Wild left for League Two side Barrow. Wild was replaced by Chris Millington. Under Millington, FC Halifax finished 11th and won the 2023 FA Trophy final at Wembley, defeating Gateshead 1–0. They reached the National League play-offs in the 2023–24 season after finishing 7th, but lost 4–2 to Solihull Moors in the eliminator. They were eliminated at the same stage of the play-offs in the following season, losing 4–0 to Oldham Athletic. Following the defeat, Chris Millington announced his resignation as manager. In June 2025 Adam Lakeland was appointed as the new manager; he left in April 2026 to become manager of Morecambe after guiding the Shaymen to an 8th-place finish. John McGrath was announced as Lakeland’s replacement in May 2026.

== Club identity ==
Period	Kit Manufacturer	Home Shirt Sponsor	Away Shirt Sponsor
2008–2009	Vandanel	Grand Union Railway	Halton Group
2009–2010	Vandanel	Doodson Broking Group	Halton Group
2010–2011	Vandanel	Doodson Broking Group	Polyframe
2011–2012	Vandanel	Doodson Broking Group	Polyframe
2012–2013	Vandanel	Doodson Broking Group	Polyframe
2013–2014	Sondico	Doodson Broking Group	MBi Consulting
2014–2015	Adidas	Doodson Broking Group	MBi Consulting
2015–2016	Adidas	MBi Consulting	Integro Doodson
2016–2017	Adidas	Northern Powerhouse Developments	GB Architectural Cladding Products
2017–2018	Adidas	Northern Powerhouse Developments	GB Architectural Cladding Products
2018–2019	Adidas	Northern Powerhouse Developments	GB Architectural Cladding Products
2019–2020	Adidas	Core Facility Services	Nuie Bathrooms
2020–2021	Adidas	Core Facility Services	Nuie Bathrooms
2021–2022	Adidas	Core Facility Services	Nuie Bathrooms

Halifax Town's traditional colours are blue and white. The club does not have any particular, identifiable style and as such there can be quite a change of style season upon season. For the majority of Halifax Town's existence the club has opted for blue shirts, blue shorts and blue socks with various different styles on the shirt. This rhythm was interrupted between 2011 and 2014 as in the 2011–12 season the kit was blue with black trim as opposed to white, between 2012 and 2014 the club wore blue shirts, white shorts and blue sock; in the 2019–20 season the kit was blue with golden trim before moving back to a blue kit with white trimmings for 2020–21, which continued into 2021–22. As Halifax Town (AFC) the kit was also variable, including full blue, blue with white shorts, blue and white stripes and in the 1970s the kit included orange and even full white kits with orange Away kits have no set standard or style nor colour and can come in a wide range of styles, such as the 2019–20 away kit which was orange with light blue trim which was exchanged for a pink and black kit or a gold and white shirt with hints of burgundy with burgundy socks and shorts in 2020–21, even the 1996–97 white away kit with purple trimmings or, finally, the black and white 2011–12 away kit with lime trimmings.

== Ground ==
FC Halifax play at The Shay, which has a capacity of 14,081 (5,830 standing).

== Rivalries ==
Club	Last match	Season
Bradford City	L 2–1	2014–15
York City	L 4-1	2025–26
Huddersfield Town	D 0–0	2001–02
Rochdale	D 2-2	2025–26
Burnley	L 1–0	1991–92

According to a survey conducted in 2003, Halifax's three main rivals were Burnley, Rochdale and Huddersfield Town. The rivalry with Burnley began in the 1980s when Burnley dropped into the Fourth Division and a number of intense affairs between the two clubs when the teams played sparked a rivalry. Despite not having met since and rarely beforehand, Halifax fans still view Burnley as being the club's biggest rival and make reference to it in several chants. Halifax met Rochdale well over 100 times in the Football League and like the Burnley rivalry has formed due to the Yorkshire-Lancashire connection and being one of the nearest towns to Halifax, albeit over the Pennines. Rochdale are the club's oldest traditional rival and many of the older generation of supporters still see them as the primary rival. The Huddersfield rivalry comes from the proximity between the two towns, being just eight miles apart. Like Burnley, the two clubs have rarely met due to Huddersfield usually being in a higher division but the fans still see there as being a rivalry.

Other rivals include Bradford City, Bradford Park Avenue and York City. Despite Bradford being a similar distance away from Halifax as Huddersfield is and having met each other far more times, is not considered as fierce a rivalry. York, although around 35 miles away, have a competitive rivalry with Halifax, particularly as the two were the only Yorkshire representatives when playing in the Conference Premier in the mid-2000s. Barnsley and Oldham Athletic were both considered rivals in the past; Barnsley have not played Halifax in a league fixture since the 1970s.

When Halifax were demoted to the regional leagues some of the local clubs tried to form competitive rivalries but none of them really took off. The biggest of these rivalries was arguably with Guiseley as the clubs met several times and during Halifax's time in the Conference North the two clubs were both pushing for the play-offs. The rivalry has since declined and has become more of a friendly one as several ex-Halifax players now play and manage there. A small rivalry formed with Chester during their season in the Conference North as the two clubs were the two big, ex-league clubs and had gone through an almost identical fate, having been liquidated and demoted three leagues. Smaller rivalries were also formed briefly with FC United of Manchester and Harrogate Town.

== Records and statistics ==
=== Player records ===
As of 21 May 2023

- Most league goals in a season – 29: Lee Gregory, (2013–14)
- Most league goals in total – 89: Lee Gregory, (2010–14)
- Most goals in a season – 40: James Dean, (2009–10)
- Most goals in total – 102: Lee Gregory, (2010–14)
- Most goals scored in a single game by one player – 4: Lee Gregory, v Gloucester City (15 September 2012), v Worcester City (2 March 2013)
- Most league appearances – 302, Sam Johnson (2015–16, 2017, 2017–)
- Most appearances – 348, Sam Johnson (2015–16, 2017, 2017–)
- Fastest goal – 25 seconds, Jon Worthington, v Gloucester City (15 September 2012)
- Oldest player – Nigel Jemson, aged 39 years and 258 days v Chorley (25 April 2009)
- Youngest player – Andrew Villerman, aged 17 years and 179 days v Newcastle Blue Star (21 March 2009)
- Oldest goalscorer – Nigel Jemson, aged 39 years and 251 days v Trafford (18 April 2009)
- Youngest goalscorer – David Brooks, aged 18 years and 59 days v Aldershot Town (5 September 2015)

=== Team records ===
As of 16 October 2024

- Highest league finish – 4th in National League, 2021–22
- Highest attendance – 8,042, v Bradford City, FA Cup 1st round, 9 November 2014
- Lowest attendance – 195, v Sunderland A.F.C u21s, National League Cup, 28 January 2025
- Lowest league attendance – 778, v Warrington Town, Northern Premier League Division One North, 16 September 2008
- Highest average attendance – 2,141, 2019–20 season
- Highest league win – 8–1, v Ossett Town, 18 January 2011. 7–0, v Hinckley United, 5 March 2013
- Worst league defeat – 0–7, v Grimsby Town, 13 October 2015
- Most goals in a game – 9, v Ossett Town, 18 January 2011, v Braintree Town, 14 November 2015, v Ossett Albion, 8 November 2016
- Longest league unbeaten run – 19, 2 March 2010 – 24 August 2010
- Most league games won in a row – 10, 18 September 2010 – 16 November 2011
- Most league games without winning – 12, 3 April 2015 – 29 August 2015
- Most league games lost in a row – 8, 11 April 2015 – 18 August 2015
- Most league games drawn in a row – 6, 7 March 2015 – 24 March 2015
- Most consecutive league clean sheets – 7, 15 March 2014 – 15 April 2014
- Most clean sheets in a season – 21, 2021–22

== Players ==
=== Current squad ===
As of 7 November 2026

Note: Flags indicate national team as defined under FIFA eligibility rules; some limited exceptions apply. Players may hold more than one non-FIFA nationality.

No.	Pos.	Nation	Player
2	DF	ENG	Max Bardell
3	DF	ENG	Raheem Conte
4	MF	ENG	Will Hugill
5	DF	ENG	Shaun Hobson
6	DF	ENG	Mackenzie Maltby
7	MF	ENG	Owen Bray
8	DF	ENG	Will Flint
9	FW	IRL	Conor Carty
10	MF	IRL	Zak Gilsenan
11	MF	ENG	Connor Douglas
13	GK	ENG	Kobe Mathers
14	FW	ENG	Amari Morgan-Smith
15	MF	ENG	Luke Brooks

No.	Pos.	Nation	Player
16	DF	BER	Deniche Hill
17	MF	ENG	Ben Tollitt
19	MF	ENG	AJ Warburton
20	MF	ENG	Tayt Trusty
21	MF	ENG	Theo Wainman
22	FW	ENG	David Kawa
23	DF	ENG	Dylan Crowe
24	MF	ENG	Tommy McDermott
27	MF	WAL	Cruz Allen (on loan from Derby County)
30	MF	ENG	Cody Johnson
31	DF	ENG	Lucas Houghton (on loan from Blackburn Rovers)
33	GK	ENG	True Grant (on loan from Stoke City)

=== Out on loan ===
Note: Flags indicate national team as defined under FIFA eligibility rules; some limited exceptions apply. Players may hold more than one non-FIFA nationality.

No.	Pos.	Nation	Player
1	GK	ENG	Sam Johnson (at Solihull Moors until 3 January 2027)

== Club officials ==
Board

- Chairman: David Bosomworth
- Directors: Bobby Ham, Stuart Peacock
- Associate Directors: Pete Hemingway
- Club secretary: Tony Allan
- President: Robert Holmes
- Vice-president: Geoff Cope & Lester
- Honorary Vice-presidents: Kemp & Queenie

Management and backroom staff

- Manager: Adam Lakeland
- Assistant manager: Sam Walker
- Goalkeeping coach: Paul Oakes
- Physiotherapist: Aaron Scholes
- Doctor: Donald Young

=== Managerial history ===
As of 27 May 2025

All competitions except West Riding County Cup

Name	From	To	Played	Won	Drawn	Lost	Win %
Jim Vince	2 July 2008	9 April 2009	46	22	10	14	47.83
Nigel Jemson (Caretaker)	9 April 2009	25 April 2009	4	0	3	1	0.00
Neil Aspin	28 April 2009	17 September 2015	332	178	78	76	53.61
Gareth McClelland (Caretaker)	17 September 2015	1 October 2015	3	0	2	1	0.00
Darren Kelly	1 October 2015	17 November 2015	10	2	1	7	20.00
Jim Harvey (Caretaker)	17 November 2015	22 December 2015	5	3	2	0	60.00
Jim Harvey	22 December 2015	24 May 2016	29	12	9	8	41.38
Billy Heath	24 May 2016	31 January 2018	88	38	23	27	43.18
Neil Young (Caretaker)	31 January 2018	20 February 2018	3	1	1	1	33.33
Jamie Fullarton	20 February 2018	15 July 2019	65	20	27	18	30.80
Steve Nichol and Nathan Clarke (Co-Caretakers)	15 July 2019	24 July 2019	0	0	0	0	0.00
Pete Wild	24 July 2019	26 May 2022	139	65	28	46	46.76
Chris Millington	28 May 2022	27 May 2025	141	54	40	47	38.30
Adam Lakeland	14 June 2025	30 April 2026	2	0			2
John McGrath	19 May 2026	Present	0	0	0	0	0

== Honours ==
FC Halifax Town's honours include:

League

- National League North (level 6)
  - Play-off winners: 2013, 2017
- Northern Premier League Premier Division (level 7)
  - Champions: 2010–11
- Northern Premier League Division One North (level 8)
  - Champions: 2009–10

Cup

- FA Trophy
  - Winners: 2015–16, 2022–23
- West Riding County Cup
  - Winners: 2012–13
