= 2025–26 Boreham Wood F.C. season =

Boreham Wood
2025–26 season
- Chairman: Danny Hunter
- Manager: Luke Garrard
- Stadium: Meadow Park
- National League: 4th
- Play-offs: Runners-up
- FA Cup: Third round
- FA Trophy: Third round
- National League Cup: Winners
- Top goalscorer: League: Matt Rush (25); All: Matt Rush (33)
- Highest home attendance: 2,803 vs West Ham United U21 (17 March 2026, National League Cup)
- Lowest home attendance: 402 vs Wolverhampton Wanderers U21 (2 December 2025, National League Cup)
- Average home league attendance: 1,238

The 2025-26 Boreham Wood F.C. season was Boreham Wood's 78th season in existence, and their first season back in the National League after promotion from the National League South in the 2024–25 season. The club competed in the National League, the FA Cup, FA Trophy, and the National League Cup. It was Luke Garrard's second season in charge of Boreham Wood since his reappointment on 13 September 2024, and his eleventh season overall with the club.

On 10 May 2026, Boreham Wood lost the National League Play-off final on penalties against Rochdale. After initially being 2–0 up on the 78 minute mark thanks to goals from Matt Rush and Abdul Abdulmalik, they conceded two goals to send the game to extra time - one from Tyler Smith, and a 90+7 minute equaliser from Emmanuel Dieseruvwe. Érico Sousa scored Boreham Wood's only successful penalty, with Cameron Coxe hitting the crossbar, and Callum Reynolds and Matt Rush seeing efforts saved by Rochdale goalkeeper Oliver Whatmuff.

== Pre-season and friendlies ==
The club announced that fifteen of the players from the previous season would remain at the club, with five players leaving upon the expiration of their contract, and two loanees returning to their parent clubs. Josef Yarney and Jayden Richardson were both offered new contracts, but opted to leave the club.

The club announced their first signing on 3 June 2025, with former loanee Junior Dixon joining the club on a permanent deal following the conclusion of his contract at Birmingham City. The club announced five more signings before the start of the season, with Joe Newton, Aaron Henry, Luke Norris, and Tom White all signing on permanent deals, and Jeff King joining on loan from fellow National League side York City until January. Boreham Wood made several more signing before the end of the transfer window.

Boreham Wood confirmed nine pre-season friendlies against Luton Town, Watford, an Arsenal XI, Billericay Town, a Tottenham Hotspur XI, Maidenhead United, West Ham United U21, and Wingate & Finchley, and Dagenham & Redbridge.

Win Draw Loss

5 July 2025 Friendly	Boreham Wood	0–3	Luton Town	Borehamwood
13:00 BST		Report	Woodrow 10'; Fanne 55', 77'	Stadium: Meadow Park

8 July 2025 Friendly	Boreham Wood	0–2	Watford	Borehamwood
19:30 BST		Report	Louza 27'; Nabizada 70'	Stadium: Meadow Park

12 July 2025 Friendly	Boreham Wood	2–2	Arsenal XI	Borehamwood
15:00 BST	Rush 2'; Dixon 83'	Report	Marciniak 11'; Hashi 21'	Stadium: Meadow Park

15 July 2025 Friendly	Billericay Town	3–1	Boreham Wood	Billericay
19:45 BST	Long 14', 53'; Kelman 80'	Report	Henry 44'	Stadium: New Lodge

19 July 2025 Friendly	Boreham Wood	2–2	Tottenham Hotspur	Borehamwood
15:00 BST	Clayden 47', 60'	Report	Elliott-Parris 76'; Olusesi 84'	Stadium: Meadow Park

22 July 2025 Friendly	Maidenhead United	3–1	Boreham Wood	Maidenhead
19:30 BST	Umerah 5'; Onariase 7'; Barratt 51'	Report	Rush 39', 70'	Stadium: York Road

25 July 2025 Friendly	Boreham Wood	1–2	West Ham United U21	Borehamwood
19:30 BST	Sousa 30'	Report	Antonio 3', 22'	Stadium: Meadow Park

29 July 2025 Friendly	Wingate & Finchley	0–2	Boreham Wood	Finchley
19:30 BST		Report	Whelan 49'; Dixon 75'	Stadium: Maurice Rebak Stadium

2 August 2025 Friendly	Dagenham & Redbridge	1–3	Boreham Wood	Dagenham
15:00 BST	Wilson 67'	Report	Norris 32'; Abdulmalik 53'; Rush 83'	Stadium: Chigwell Construction Stadium

== Competitions ==
Boreham Wood will play in the National League in the 2025–26 season, as well as in three cup competitions, joining the FA Cup in the Fourth Qualifying Round, the FA Trophy in the Third Round, and the National League Cup in the Group Stage.

=== National League ===
Pos	Team	Pld	W	D	L	GF	GA	GD	Pts	Promotion, qualification or relegation
2	Rochdale (O, P)	46	33	7	6	88	41	+47	106	Qualification for National League play-off semi-finals
3	Carlisle United	46	29	8	9	87	51	+36	95	Qualification for National League play-off semi-finals
4	Boreham Wood	46	27	9	10	95	58	+37	90	Qualification for the National League play-off quarter-finals
5	Scunthorpe United	46	23	13	10	77	62	+15	82	Qualification for the National League play-off quarter-finals
6	Southend United	46	23	12	11	83	47	+36	81	Qualification for the National League play-off quarter-finals

Source: National League official site
Rules for classification: 1) Points; 2) Goal difference; 3) Number of goals scored; 4) Number of matches won; 5) Head-to-head results
(O) Play-off winners; (P) Promoted

==== Results summary ====
Overall								Home						Away					
Pld	W	D	L	GF	GA	GD	Pts	W	D	L	GF	GA	GD	W	D	L	GF	GA	GD
46	27	9	10	95	58	+37	90	17	2	4	48	24	+24	10	7	6	47	34	+13

Last updated: 22 April 2026.

==== Matches - Regular Season ====
Boreham Wood's fixtures were announced on 9 July 2025.

9 August 2025 1	Boreham Wood	0–2	Rochdale	Borehamwood
15:00 BST		Report	Dieseruvwe 49', 52'	Stadium: Meadow Park; Attendance: 1,151; Referee: Wayne Cartmel

16 August 2025 2	Carlisle United	3–3	Boreham Wood	Carlisle
15:00 BST	Kelly 49'; Linney 53', 71'	Report	Norris 40', 79'; O'Connell 84'	Stadium: Brunton Park; Attendance: 8,741; Referee: James Westgate

20 August 2025 3	Boreham Wood	2–1	Braintree Town	Borehamwood
19:45 BST	Norris 31' (pen.), 67'	Report	Marshall-Miranda 45+4'; Terry (yellow card) 21' (yellow-red card) 81'	Stadium: Meadow Park; Attendance: 974; Referee: Harry Wager

25 August 2025 4	Boreham Wood	2–1	Truro City	Borehamwood
15:00 BST	White 27'; Rush 90+3'	Report	Dean 34'	Stadium: Meadow Park; Attendance: 958; Referee: Callum Walchester

30 August 2025 5	Hartlepool United	0–0	Boreham Wood	Hartlepool
15:00 BST		Report		Stadium: Victoria Park; Attendance: 3,612; Referee: Jamie O'Connor

3 September 2025 6	Sutton United	3–4	Boreham Wood	Sutton
19:45 BST	Harris 32'; Simper 44'; Pruti 90+5'	Report	King 10'; Abdulmalik 65'; Brunt 85' (pen.); Érico Sousa 90+3'	Stadium: VBS Community Stadium; Attendance: 1,852; Referee: Jason Richardson

6 September 2025 7	Boreham Wood	3–0	Morecambe	Borehamwood
15:00 BST	Richardson 7'; Rush 36', 66'	Report	Agyemang (yellow card) 26' (yellow-red card) 45+3'	Stadium: Meadow Park; Attendance: 1,035; Referee: Isaac Searle

13 September 2025 8	Boreham Wood	3–1	Altrincham	Borehamwood
15:00 BST	Érico Sousa 17', 28'; Brunt 44' (pen.)	Report	Knowles 58'; Weaver (red card) 90+3'	Stadium: Meadow Park; Attendance: 921; Referee: Aji Ajibola

20 September 2025 9	Boston United	0–2	Boreham Wood	Boston
15:00 BST		Report	Brunt 49'; Abdulmalik 61'	Stadium: Jakemans Community Stadium; Attendance: 1,812; Referee: Oliver Mackey

24 September 2025 10	Scunthorpe United	1–1	Boreham Wood	Scunthorpe
19:45 BST	Roberts 74'	Report	Rush 1'	Stadium: Attis Arena; Attendance: 3,602; Referee: Gareth Rhodes

27 September 2025 11	Boreham Wood	1–0	Woking	Borehamwood
12:30 BST	Rush 33'	Report		Stadium: Meadow Park; Attendance: 1,208; Referee: Richard Eley

30 September 2025 12	Boreham Wood	1–1	Southend United	Borehamwood
19:45 BST	Rush 69'	Report	Walker 81'	Stadium: Meadow Park; Attendance: 1,839; Referee: Alex Chilowicz

4 October 2025 13	Yeovil Town	0–3	Boreham Wood	Yeovil
15:00 BST		Report	Abdulmalik 20'; Rush 45+7'; Ilesanmi 63'	Stadium: Huish Park; Attendance: 2,660; Referee: Niall Smith

18 October 2025 14	Boreham Wood	2–0	Eastleigh	Borehamwood
15:00 BST	Abdulmalik 53'; Richardson 81'	Report		Stadium: Meadow Park; Attendance: 1,021; Referee: Elliott Swallow

21 October 2025 15	York City	2–2	Boreham Wood	York
19:45 BST	Newby 45+5'; Fallowfield 89'	Report	Rush 2', 66'	Stadium: LNER Community Stadium; Attendance: 5,193; Referee: Declan Brown

25 October 2025 16	Forest Green Rovers	2–1	Boreham Wood	Nailsworth
15:00 BST	Buyabu 34'; Bunker 75' (pen.)	Report	Rush 65'	Stadium: Bolt New Lawn; Attendance: 1,825; Referee: Zac Kennard-Kettle

4 November 2025 17	Boreham Wood	1–0	Aldershot Town	Borehamwood
19:45 BST	Abdulmalik 16'	Report		Stadium: Meadow Park; Attendance: 931; Referee: Matthew Scholes

8 November 2025 18	Brackley Town	1–3	Boreham Wood	Brackley
15:00 BST	Lowe 89'	Report	Rush 45+1'; Abdulmalik 61'; Érico Sousa 86'	Stadium: St James Park; Attendance: 1,050; Referee: Callum Walchester

15 November 2025 19	Boreham Wood	1–2	Tamworth	Borehamwood
15:03 BST	Rush 20'	Report	Milnes 29'; Duku 72'	Stadium: Meadow Park; Attendance: 1,353; Referee: William Finnie

22 November 2025 20	Gateshead	0–3	Boreham Wood	Gateshead
15:00 BST		Report	Brunt 5' (pen.), 75'; Booty 90+4'	Stadium: Gateshead International Stadium; Attendance: 549; Referee: Melissa Burgin

29 November 2025 21	Boreham Wood	2–1	Halifax Town	Borehamwood
17:30 BST	Richardson 19'; Érico Sousa 67'	Report	Devonport 90+5'	Stadium: Meadow Park; Attendance: 943; Referee: Lewis Sandoe

21 December 2025 22	Boreham Wood	2–0	Carlisle United	Borehamwood
16:00 BST	Brunt 31'; Abdulmalik 37'	Report		Stadium: Meadow Park; Attendance: 1,866; Referee: Isaac Searle

26 December 2025 23	Wealdstone	0–4	Boreham Wood	Ruislip
15:00 BST		Report	Abdulmalik 2'; Rush 27'; Richardson 52', 82'	Stadium: Grosvenor Vale; Attendance: 1,982; Referee: Kirsty Dowle

30 December 2025 24	Boreham Wood	2–1	Solihull Moors	Borehamwood
19:45 BST	Booty 10'; Rush 39'	Report	Sbarra 26'	Stadium: Meadow Park; Attendance: 1,011; Referee: Aji Ajibola

17 January 2026 25	Braintree Town	0–3	Boreham Wood	Braintree, Essex
15:00 BST		Report	Brunt 20'; Rush 31'; Clayden 49'	Stadium: Rare Breed Meat Co. Stadium; Attendance: 748; Referee: Declan Bourne

20 January 2026 26	Boreham Wood	1–3	Scunthorpe United	Borehamwood
19:45 BST	Norris 84'	Report	O'Connell 27' (o.g.); Roberts 39'; Reynolds 45+4' (o.g.)	Stadium: Meadow Park; Attendance: 1,081; Referee: Robert Massey-Ellis

24 January 2026 27	Altrincham	3–1	Boreham Wood	Altrincham
15:00 BST	Crankshaw 13'; Khan 48'; Cooper 75'	Report	Booty 81'	Stadium: J. Davidson Stadium; Attendance: 1,643; Referee: Gareth Rhodes

31 January 2026 28	Boreham Wood	1–2	Boston United	Borehamwood
15:00 BST	Abdulmalik 45+1'	Report	John-Lewis 52' (pen.); Hiwula 81'	Stadium: Meadow Park; Attendance: 1,157; Referee: Alan Dale

3 February 2026 29	Rochdale	4–1	Boreham Wood	Rochdale
19:45 BST	Rodney 6'; Dieseruvwe 29', 50'; Henderson 75'	Report	Brunt 71' (pen.)	Stadium: Crown Oil Arena; Attendance: 2,356; Referee: Simon Mather

11 February 2026 30	Boreham Wood	3–2	Yeovil Town	Borehamwood
19:45 BST	Brunt 32', 52'; Henry 90+2'	Report	Wannell 27'; Ferguson (yellow card) 49' (yellow-red card) 64'; Daly 71'	Stadium: Meadow Park; Attendance: 539; Referee: Harrison Blair

14 February 2026 31	Eastleigh	2–2	Boreham Wood	Eastleigh
15:00 BST	Blair 10'; Tabor 56'	Report	Brunt 20'; Richardson 25'	Stadium: Silverlake Stadium; Attendance: 2,092; Referee: James Durkin

21 February 2026 32	Boreham Wood	1–1	Forest Green Rovers	Borehamwood
15:00 BST	Richardson 52'	Report	McAllister 65' (pen.); Osude (red card) 83'	Stadium: Meadow Park; Attendance: 1,141; Referee: Neil Hair

24 February 2026 33	Southend United	0–2	Boreham Wood	Southend-on-Sea
19:45 BST		Report	Abdulmalik 11'; Rush 75'	Stadium: Roots Hall; Attendance: 7,332; Referee: Craig Hicks

28 February 2026 34	Tamworth	3–2	Boreham Wood	Tamworth
15:00 BST	Lynch 24', 61'; Mols 52'	Report	Rush 58', 76'	Stadium: The Lamb Ground; Attendance: 1,009; Referee: Melissa Burgin

3 March 2026 35	Boreham Wood	3–2	York City	Borehamwood
19:45 BST	Richardson 48'; Coxe 78'; O'Connell 87'	Report	Pearce 6'; Stones (yellow card) 45+2' (yellow-red card) 61'; Banks 90+2'	Stadium: Meadow Park; Attendance: 1,801; Referee: Lewis Sandoe

7 March 2026 36	Boreham Wood	5–3	Brackley Town	Borehamwood
12:30 BST	Rush 5', 84'; Richardson 12'; Abdulmalik 21'; Brunt 69' (pen.)	Report	Byrne 45+5'; Wodskou 49'; Brown 55'	Stadium: Meadow Park; Attendance: 980; Referee: Matthew Scholes

10 March 2026 37	Woking	2–2	Boreham Wood	Woking
19:45 BST	Akinola 56'; Drewe 81'	Report	Rush 21', 90+6'; Marshall-Miranda (yellow card) 6' (yellow-red card) 29'	Stadium: Laithwaite Community Stadium; Attendance: 1,249; Referee: Sam Mulhall

14 March 2026 38	Halifax Town	3–2	Boreham Wood	Halifax
15:00 BST	Hmami 20'; Smith 32'; Bray 86'	Report	Brunt 25'; Richardson 54'	Stadium: The Shay; Attendance: 1,254; Referee: James Westgate

21 March 2026 39	Boreham Wood	3–0	Gateshead	Borehamwood
15:00 BST	Ayinde 12'; John 38' (o.g.); Brunt 46'	Report		Stadium: Meadow Park; Attendance: 1,054; Referee: Wayne Cartmel

24 March 2026 40	Aldershot Town	1–2	Boreham Wood	Aldershot
19:45 BST	Peart 22'	Report	Rush 3'; Booty 16'	Stadium: EBB Stadium; Attendance: 1,366; Referee: Adrian Quelch

28 March 2026 41	Truro City	0–0	Boreham Wood	Truro
15:00 BST		Report		Stadium: Truro City Stadium; Attendance: 1,914; Referee: Declan Brown

3 April 2026 42	Boreham Wood	5–1	Wealdstone	Borehamwood
15:00 BST	Clarke 33', 42', 74' (pen.); Brunt 53'; Abdulmalik 79'	Report	Adarkwa 48'	Stadium: Meadow Park; Attendance: 1,611; Referee: Ben Atkinson

6 April 2026 43	Solihull Moors	4–1	Boreham Wood	Solihull
15:00 BST	Baines 27'; Lipsiuc 36', 48'; Sbarra 54'	Report	Landers 81'	Stadium: Damson Park; Attendance: 943; Referee: Aaron Farmer

11 April 2026 44	Boreham Wood	3–0	Hartlepool United	Borehamwood
12:30 BST	Rush 50', 55', 90+3'	Report		Stadium: Meadow Park; Attendance: 1,209; Referee: William Davis

18 April 2026 45	Morecambe	0–3	Boreham Wood	Morecambe
15:00 BST		Report	Abdulmalik 27'; Newton 90'; Richardson 90+4'	Stadium: Mazuma Mobile Stadium; Attendance: 3,497; Referee: Dean Watson

25 April 2026 46	Boreham Wood	1–0	Sutton United	Borehamwood
12:30 BST	Ayinde 28'	Report		Stadium: Meadow Park; Attendance: 1,471; Referee: Lee Swabey

==== Play-offs ====
Boreham Wood entered the play-offs after finishing 4th in the National League. This meant that they would face the team who finished in 7th, which was Forest Green Rovers. After defeating Forest Green, Boreham Wood are set to face Carlisle United on 3 May 2026, with the winner facing either Rochdale or Scunthorpe United in the final on 10 May 2026 at Wembley Stadium.

29 April 2026 Promotion Play-offs Qualifying Round	Boreham Wood	1–0	Forest Green Rovers	Borehamwood
19:45 BST	Brunt 105+3'	Report		Stadium: Meadow Park; Attendance: 2,452; Referee: Kirsty Dowle

3 May 2026 Promotion Play-offs Semi Final	Carlisle United	1–2 (a.e.t.)	Boreham Wood	Carlisle
12:30 BST	Feeney 40'; Luamba (red card) 96'	Report	Abdulmalik 28'; Brunt 106'	Stadium: Brunton Park; Attendance: 13,814; Referee: Martin Woods

10 May 2026 Promotion Play-offs final	Boreham Wood	2–2 (a.e.t.) (1–3 p)	Rochdale	London
15:00 BST	Rush 22'; Abdulmalik 69'	Report	Smith 78'; Dieseruvwe 90+7'	Stadium: Wembley Stadium; Referee: Andrew Humphries
	Penalties
	Reynolds (penalty missed); Sousa (penalty scored); Rush (penalty missed); Coxe (penalty missed)		Beckwith (penalty scored); Francis (penalty scored); Perry (penalty scored)

=== FA Cup ===
On 29 September 2025, Boreham Wood were drawn away to Eastbourne Borough in the FA Cup fourth round qualifying.

11 October 2025 Fourth qualifying round	Eastbourne Borough	0–3	Boreham Wood	Eastbourne
15:00 BST		Report	Rush 47'; Abdulmalik 65'; Dixon 90'	Stadium: The Connect Management Stadium; Attendance: 1,019

1 November 2025 First round	Boreham Wood	3–0	Crawley Town	Borehamwood
15:00 BST	Rush 9'; Brunt 15' (pen.); Abdulmalik 72'	Report	Loft (red card) 45+3'	Stadium: Meadow Park; Attendance: 1,536; Referee: Sam Mulhall

7 December 2025 Second round	Boreham Wood	3–0	Newport County	Borehamwood
14:30 BST	King 32'; Booty 35'; Rush 59'	Report		Stadium: Meadow Park; Attendance: 1,875; Referee: Paul Howard

10 January 2026 Third round	Boreham Wood	0–5	Burton Albion	Borehamwood
15:00 BST		Report	Lofthouse 35'; O'Connell 41' (o.g.); Tavares 67'; Williams 82'; McKiernan 90+2'	Stadium: Meadow Park; Attendance: 2,201; Referee: Andrew Humphries

=== FA Trophy ===
On 17 November 2025, Boreham Wood were drawn at home against fellow National League side Brackley Town, with the game set to take place on 13 December 2025.

13 December 2025 Third round	Boreham Wood	3–3 (1–3 p)	Brackley Town	Borehamwood
15:00 BST	Brunt 6'; King 67'; Érico Sousa 90+4'	Report	Lowe 34'; Morrison 43'; Lyttle 74'	Stadium: Meadow Park; Attendance: 458; Referee: Harrison Blair
	Penalties
	Booty (penalty scored); Rush (penalty missed); Brunt (penalty missed); O'Connell (penalty missed)		(penalty missed) Byrne; (penalty scored) Price; (penalty scored) Lyttle; (penalty scored) Roberts

=== National League Cup ===
==== Group Stage ====
On 14 July 2025, Boreham Wood were drawn into Group B of the 2025-26 National League Cup, alongside Braintree Town, Wealdstone, Forest Green Rovers, Nottingham Forest U21, West Bromwich Albion U21, Leicester CIty U21, and Wolverhampton Wanderers U21. Due to the format of the competition, Boreham Wood would play four home games in the group stage, against the under 21 sides in the group, which was the case for Braintree, Wealdstone, and Forest Green.

12 August 2025 1	Boreham Wood	2–0	Nottingham Forest U21	Borehamwood
19:00 BST	Clayden 65'; Rush 80'	Report		Stadium: Meadow Park; Attendance: 418; Referee: Harrison Blair

9 September 2025 2	Boreham Wood	3–1	West Bromwich Albion U21	Borehamwood
19:00 BST	Dixon 45+4'; Clayden 61'; Érico Sousa 67'	Report	Ntege 36'	Stadium: Meadow Park; Attendance: 443; Referee: Sam Mulhall

25 November 2025 3	Boreham Wood	4–3	Leicester City U21	Borehamwood
19:00 BST	Richardson 8', 38'; Norris 65' (pen.); Benton 70'	Report	Gray 17'; Evans 19'; Otchere 28'	Stadium: Meadow Park; Attendance: 404; Referee: Niall Smith

2 December 2025 4	Boreham Wood	4–0	Wolverhampton Wanderers U21	Borehamwood
19:00 BST	Norris 1'; Richardson 44'; Benton 56'; Booty 90+1'	Report		Stadium: Meadow Park; Attendance: 402; Referee: Andrew Humphries

==== Knockout phase ====
27 January 2026 Quarter-finals	Boreham Wood	5–2	Brackley Town	Borehamwood
19:00 BST	Rush 4', 18'; Ilesanmi 32'; Clayden 54'; Coxe 90+4'	Report	Hall 60'; Roberts 77'	Stadium: Meadow Park; Attendance: 509; Referee: Wayne Cartmel

17 February 2026 Semi-finals	Boreham Wood	2–0	Truro City	Borehamwood
19:30 BST	Booty 85'; Rush 90+10'	Report	Pyke (red card) 60'	Stadium: Meadow Park; Attendance: 678; Referee: Andrew Humphries

17 March 2026 Final	Boreham Wood	2–2 (7–6 p)	West Ham United U21	Borehamwood
19:00 BST	Abdulmalik 49'; Henry 90+3'	Report	Orford 26'; Landers 45'	Stadium: Meadow Park; Attendance: 2,803; Referee: Elliott Swallow
	Penalties
	Brunt (penalty scored); Rush (penalty scored); Henry (penalty scored); Coxe (penalty scored); Érico Sousa (penalty scored); Bush (penalty scored); O'Connell (penalty scored)		(penalty scored) Ajala; (penalty scored) Orford; (penalty scored) Golambeckis; (penalty scored) Briggs; (penalty scored) Cummings; (penalty scored) Battrum; (penalty missed) Caliste

== Squad statistics ==
As of match played 3 May 2026

No.	Pos.	Nat.	Name	League		Play-offs		FA Cup		FA Trophy		National League Cup		Total		Discipline	
No.	Pos.	Nat.	Name	Apps	Goals	Apps	Goals	Apps	Goals	Apps	Goals	Apps	Goals	Apps	Goals	Yellow card	Red card
2	DF	WAL	Cameron Coxe	15+19	1	0+3	0	1+2	0	0	0	6+1	1	21+25	2	6	0
3	DF	ENG	Femi Ilesanmi	31+9	1	3	0	+2	0	0	0	5+1	1	39+12	2	5	1
4	MF	ENG	Jack Payne	0+1	0	0	0	0+1	0	0	0	2+1	0	2+2	0	0	0
5	DF	ENG	Chris Bush	46	0	3	0	4	0	1	0	6+1	0	60+1	0	10	0
6	DF	ENG	Charlie O'Connell	46	2	3	0	4	0	1	0	6+1	0	60+1	2	8	0
7	MF	POR	Érico Sousa	20+7	5	0+2	0	2+1	0	0+1	1	1+3	1	23+14	7	1	0
8	MF	ENG	Zak Brunt	40+2	13	3	2	4	1	1	1	2+4	0	50+6	17	5	0
10	FW	ENG	Abdul Abdulmalik	44+1	13	3	2	4	2	1	0	2+1	1	54+2	18	2	0
11	FW	IRE	Leon Ayinde	5+8	2	3	0	0	0	0	0	1+1	0	9+9	2	3	0
12	DF	ENG	Joe Newton	15+19	1	0	0	4	0	1	0	5+1	0	25+20	1	1	1
14	MF	ENG	Aaron Henry	1+5	1	0+1	0	0	0	0	0	3+1	1	4+7	2	0	0
15	DF	IRE	James Clarke	8	3	3	0	0	0	0	0	0	0	11	3	2	0
16	DF	ENG	Callum Reynolds	27+7	0	0+3	0	4	0	1	0	3+1	0	35+11	0	6	0
17	MF	ENG	Charles Clayden	12+18	1	0	0	0+3	0	0+1	0	4+1	3	16+23	4	0	0
18	FW	ENG	Luke Norris	7+12	5	0	0	0+3	0	1	0	2+1	2	10+16	7	3	0
19	MF	ENG	Tom White	29+4	1	3	0	2	0	0	0	1	0	35+4	1	7	0
20	MF	ENG	Lewis Richardson	17+19	11	0+3	0	2+2	0	1	0	4+1	3	24+25	14	1	0
21	MF	SPA	Marley Marshall-Miranda	9+6	0	0	0	0+1	0	0	0	0	0	9+7	0	4	1
22	GK	ENG	Ted Curd	24	0	3	0	2	0	1	0	4	0	34	0	0	0
23	MF	ENG	Regan Booty	23+2	4	3	0	2	1	1	0	5	2	34+2	7	4	1
24	DF	ENG	Junior Robinson	3+2	0	0	0	0+1	0	0	0	0	0	3+3	0	2	0
25	DF	ENG	Ollie Kensdale	4	0	0	0	0+1	0	0	0	2	0	6+1	0	1	0
26	FW	SCO	Josh Landers	1+5	1	0+3	0	0	0	0	0	0	0	1+8	1	0	0
32	FW	ENG	Matt Rush	41+5	25	3	1	4	3	0+1	0	3+4	4	51+10	33	3	0
Player(s) who featured but departed the club during the season:
1	GK	ENG	Nathan Ashmore	12	0	0	0	1	0	0	0	3	0	16	0	0	0
8	MF	ENG	Tom Whelan	0+2	0	0	0	0	0	0	0	1	0	1+2	0	0	0
9	FW	ENG	Junior Dixon	0+12	0	0	0	0+1	1	0	0	2	1	2+13	2	0	0
11	MF	ENG	Jon Benton	0+8	0	0	0	0+1	0	0+1	0	4	2	4+10	2	1	0
15	DF	ENG	Jeff King	19+3	1	0	0	3	1	1	1	2+2	0	25+5	3	6	0
22	GK	ENG	Finlay Herrick	10	0	0	0	1	0	0	0	0	0	11	0	0	0

== Transfers ==
=== In ===
Date	Pos.	Name	From	Fee	Ref.
1 July 2025	FW	(England) Junior Dixon	(England) Birmingham City	Free	
1 July 2025	DF	(England) Joe Newton	(England) Solihull Moors	Free	
2 July 2025	MF	(England) Aaron Henry	(England) Charlton Athletic	Free	
24 July 2025	FW	(England) Luke Norris	(England) Tranmere Rovers	Free	
5 August 2025	MF	(England) Tom White	(England) Morecambe	Free	
1 September 2025	MF	(England) Lewis Richardson	(England) Burnley	Free	
13 November 2025	MF	(England) Zak Brunt	(England) Barnet	Undisclosed	
17 December 2025	MF	(Spain) Marley Marshall-Miranda	(England) Braintree Town	Free	
9 January 2026	DF	(England) Ollie Kensdale	(England) Barnet	Undisclosed	
14 January 2026	MF	(England) Regan Booty	(England) Barrow	Undisclosed	
11 March 2026	DF	(Republic of Ireland) James Clarke	(England) Solihull Moors	Undisclosed	

=== Out ===
Date	Pos.	Name	To	Fee	Ref.
19 August 2025	MF	(England) Tom Whelan	(England) AFC Fylde	Undisclosed	
29 December 2025	MF	(England) Jon Benton	(England) Billericay Town	Free	

=== Loaned in ===
Date from	Date to	Pos.	Name	From	Ref.
3 July 2025	1 January 2026	DF	(England) Jeff King	(England) York City	
28 August 2025	13 November 2025	MF	(England) Zak Brunt	(England) Barnet	
1 September 2025	29 October 2025	GK	(England) Finlay Herrick	(England) West Ham United	
12 November 2025	31 May 2026	GK	(England) Ted Curd	(England) Chelsea	
17 November 2025	13 January 2026	MF	(England) Regan Booty	(England) Barrow	
9 January 2026	31 May 2026	DF	(England) Junior Robinson	(England) West Ham United	
13 February 2026	15 March 2026	FW	(Republic of Ireland) Leon Ayinde	(England) Ipswich Town	
26 March 2026	31 May 2026	FW	(Scotland) Josh Landers	(England) West Ham United	

=== Loaned out ===
Date from	Date to	Pos.	Name	To	Ref.
1 October 2025	29 October 2025	GK	(England) Nathan Ashmore	(England) Bedford Town	
11 November 2025	26 January 2026	GK	(England) Nathan Ashmore	(England) Bedford Town	
11 November 2025	10 January 2026	FW	(England) Junior Dixon	(England) Hampton & Richmond	
21 November 2025	28 January 2026	MF	(England) Aaron Henry	(England) Hornchurch	
17 January 2026	31 May 2026	FW	(England) Junior Dixon	(England) Chatham Town	
20 February 2026	26 April 2026	GK	(England) Nathan Ashmore	(England) Bedford Town	

=== Released / Out of Contract ===
Date	Pos.	Name	Subsequent club	Join date	Ref.
1 July 2025	DF	(England) David Agbontohoma	(England) Maidstone United	8 July 2025	
1 July 2025	FW	(Ghana) Kwesi Appiah	(England) Ebbsfleet United	1 July 2025	
1 July 2025	DF	(England) Josh Hare	(England) Hornchurch	1 July 2025	
1 July 2025	FW	(England) Tyrone Marsh	(England) Bedford Town	1 July 2025	
1 July 2025	DF	(England) Jayden Richardson	(Scotland) St. Mirren	1 July 2025	
1 July 2025	MF	(Tanzania) Mo Sagaf	(England) Eastbourne Borough	5 August 2025	
1 July 2025	DF	(England) Josef Yarney	(England) Macclesfield	7 July 2025	

== Awards ==
=== National League Player of the Month ===
Month	Player	Ref.
October	(England) Abdul Abdulmalik	

=== National League Manager of the Month ===
Month	Manager	Ref.
September	(England) Luke Garrard	
December	(England) Luke Garrard	
April	(England) Luke Garrard	

=== National League Team of the Season ===
Pos	Player	Ref.
MF	(England) Zak Brunt	
MF	(England) Abdul Abdulmalik	
