= 2026 National League play-off final =

- Event: 2025–26 National League
Boreham Wood	Rochdale
2	2
- After extra time Rochdale won 3–1 on penalties
- Date: 10 May 2026
- Venue: Wembley Stadium, London
- Referee: Andrew Humphries
- Attendance: 17,740

The 2026 National League play-off final, known as the Enterprise National League Promotion Final for sponsorship reasons, was an association football match played on 10 May 2026 at Wembley Stadium, London, between Boreham Wood and Rochdale.

The match determined the second and final team to gain promotion from the National League, the fifth tier of English football, to EFL League Two. The champions of the 2025–26 National League season gained automatic promotion to EFL League Two, while the teams placed from second to seventh took part in the play-offs; Boreham Wood finished in fourth position while Rochdale finished in second position. Carlisle United and Scunthorpe United were the losing semi-finalists, while Southend United and Forest Green Rovers had lost at the quarter-final stage.

== Route to the final ==
National League final table, leading positions
Pos	Team	Pld	W	D	L	GF	GA	GD	Pts
1	York City	46	33	9	4	114	41	+73	108
2	Rochdale	46	33	7	6	88	41	+47	106
3	Carlisle United	46	29	8	9	87	51	+36	95
4	Boreham Wood	46	27	9	10	95	58	+37	90
5	Scunthorpe United	46	23	13	10	77	62	+15	82
6	Southend United	46	23	12	11	83	47	+36	81
7	Forest Green Rovers	46	23	12	11	82	52	+30	81

=== Quarter-finals ===
28 April 2026	Scunthorpe United	1–0	Southend United	Scunthorpe
19:45 BST	Roberts 5'			Stadium: Attis Arena; Attendance: 6,248

29 April 2026	Boreham Wood	1–0 (a.e.t.)	Forest Green Rovers	Borehamwood
19:45 BST	Brunt 105+3'			Stadium: Meadow Park; Attendance: 2,452

==== Semi-finals ====
3 May 2026	Carlisle United	1–2 (a.e.t.)	Boreham Wood	Carlisle
12:30 BST	Feeney 40'		Abdulmalik 28'; Brunt 106'	Stadium: Brunton Park; Attendance: 13,814

3 May 2026	Rochdale	2–1	Scunthorpe United	Rochdale
15:00 BST	Evans 3' (o.g.); Rodney 57'		Howe 81'	Stadium: Spotland Stadium; Attendance: 7,552

== Match ==
=== Details ===
10 May 2025
15:00 BST

Boreham Wood	2–2 (a.e.t.)	Rochdale
Rush 22'; Abdulmalik 69'	Report	Smith 78'; Dieseruvwe 90+7'
Penalties
Reynolds (penalty missed); Sousa (penalty scored); Rush (penalty missed); Coxe (penalty missed)	1–3	(penalty scored) Beckwith; (penalty scored) Francis; (penalty scored) Perry

Wembley Stadium, London
Attendance: 17,740
Referee: Andrew Humphries

GK	22	(England) Ted Curd
RB	15	(Republic of Ireland) James Clarke
CB	6	(England) Charlie O'Connell
CB	5	(England) Chris Bush	(yellow card) 57'
LB	3	(England) Femi Ilesanmi		(substituted off) 105'
CM	23	(England) Regan Booty		(substituted off) 70'
CM	19	(England) Tom White (c)		(substituted off) 103'
RW	11	(Republic of Ireland) Leon Ayinde		(substituted off) 82'
AM	8	(England) Zak Brunt		(substituted off) 91'
LW	10	(England) Abdul Abdulmalik		(substituted off) 82'
CF	32	(England) Matt Rush
Substitutes:
GK	1	(England) Nathan Ashmore
DF	2	(Wales) Cameron Coxe		(substituted on) 82'
DF	16	(England) Callum Reynolds		(substituted on) 70'
MF	7	(Portugal) Érico Sousa		(substituted on) 105'
MF	14	(England) Aaron Henry		(substituted on) 103'
FW	20	(England) Lewis Richardson		(substituted on) 82'
FW	26	(Scotland) Josh Landers		(substituted on) 91'
Manager:
(England) Luke Garrard

GK	1	(England) Oliver Whatmuff
CB	2	(England) Kyron Gordon
CB	6	(England) Ethan Ebanks-Landell (c)
CB	25	(England) Callum Perry
RM	14	(England) Tobi Adebayo-Rowling		(substituted off) 75'
CM	4	(England) Ryan East		(substituted off) 86'
CM	8	(England) Harvey Gilmour		(substituted off) 90'
LM	12	(England) Luke Hannant		(substituted off) 75'
RW	18	(England) Aidan Barlow		(substituted off) 46'
CF	9	(England) Emmanuel Dieseruvwe
LW	10	(England) Devante Rodney		(substituted off) 75'
Substitutes:
DF	33	(England) Sam Beckwith		(substituted on) 75'
DF	35	(England) Archie Baptiste
MF	16	(England) Casey Pettit		(substituted on) 86'
MF	17	(England) Joe Pritchard	(yellow card) 120+1'	(substituted on) 46'
MF	36	(England) Edward Francis		(substituted on) 90'
FW	38	(England) Tyler Smith		(substituted on) 75'
FW	40	(England) Ian Henderson		(substituted on) 75'
Manager:
(England) Jimmy McNulty

== Broadcasting ==
The match was televised live on DAZN. Audio commentary was provided by BBC Local Radio, with BBC Three Counties Radio covering the game for Boreham Wood and BBC Radio Manchester doing so for Rochdale.
