= 2025–26 National League Cup =

Tournament details
- Country: England
- Teams: 32

Final positions
- Champions: Boreham Wood (1st title)
- Runners-up: West Ham United U21

Tournament statistics
- Matches played: 71
- Goals scored: 233 (3.28 per match)
- Attendance: 47,812 (673 per match)
- Top goal scorer(s): (England) Joshua Ajala (West Ham United U21) (England) Owen Devonport (FC Halifax Town) (Lebanon) Hady Ghandour (Aldershot Town) (England) Connor Hall (Brackley Town) (England) Oliver Lynch (Tamworth) (England) Sean Neave (Newcastle United U21) (England) Matt Rush (Boreham Wood) (4 goals each)
- All statistics correct as of 17 March 2026.

The 2025–26 National League Cup, is the 27th season in the history of the competition, and the second since its revival in 2024–25. It is a knock-out tournament between clubs in the National League, the fifth tier of the English football league system, and 16 professional under-21 teams playing in Premier League 2.

A prize fund of £1 million is distributed to non-league clubs in the fifth and sixth tiers, with the intention to provide younger players from the PL2 with senior experience. The relaunch of the competition has otherwise been controversial, with criticism and negativity from non-league clubs and their supporters.

== Participating clubs ==
- 16 invited clubs from the National League.
- 16 invited Premier League 2 under-21 teams.

	National League	Premier League 2
Clubs	Aldershot Town; Boreham Wood (Note: Morecambe were originally allocated to Group A On 30 July, Morecambe were replaced due to being suspended from the National League due to financial reasons. The National League announced Boreham Wood would join Group B, while Brackley Town were moved to Group A in Morecambe's place.); Boston United; Brackley Town; Braintree Town; FC Halifax Town; Forest Green Rovers; Gateshead; Rochdale; Scunthorpe United; Solihull Moors; Sutton United; Tamworth; Truro City; Wealdstone; Woking	Blackburn Rovers; Brighton & Hove Albion; Burnley; Everton; Fulham; Leeds United; Leicester City; Manchester United; Middlesbrough; Newcastle United; Nottingham Forest; Southampton; Sunderland; West Bromwich Albion; West Ham United; Wolverhampton Wanderers
Total	16	16

== Competition format ==
League phase

- Four groups of eight teams.
- All groups will include four National League sides and four academy sides.
- All National League clubs will play each academy side once, and all academy sides will play each National League side once (academy sides will play all group matches away from home).
- Clubs will be awarded three points for a win and one point for a draw. Drawn matches will end in a penalty shoot-out with an extra point for the winners.
- The top two teams in each group will progress to the knockout stage.

Knockout stage

- In Round 2, the group winners will be seeded and the group runners-up will be unseeded in the draw.
- In Round 2, teams who played in the same group as each other in the group stage will be kept apart.

== Broadcasting ==
The National League announced all fixtures would be streamed live and free on the National League YouTube channel.

== Group stage ==
The group stage draw was made on 14 July 2025.

=== Group A ===
Pos	Div	Team	Pld	W	PW	PL	L	GF	GA	GD	Pts	Qualification
1	NL	Tamworth	4	4	0	0	0	12	1	+11	12	Advance to knockout stage
2	NL	Brackley Town	4	3	0	1	0	7	3	+4	10	Advance to knockout stage
3	NL	Rochdale	4	3	0	0	1	6	5	+1	9	
4	NL	Solihull Moors	4	2	1	0	1	6	3	+3	8	
5	ACA	Everton U21	4	1	1	0	2	4	5	−1	5	
6	ACA	Manchester United U21	4	1	0	0	3	4	9	−5	3	
7	ACA	Burnley U21	4	0	0	1	3	2	8	−6	1	
8	ACA	Blackburn Rovers U21	4	0	0	0	4	2	9	−7	0	

Source: Premier League

12 August 2025	Solihull Moors	1–2	Everton U21	Solihull
19:00 BST (UTC+1)	Holmes 10'	Report	Graham 76', 90'	Stadium: Damson Park; Attendance: 942; Referee: Richard Eley

12 August 2025	Brackley Town	2–0	Blackburn Rovers U21	Brackley
19:45 BST (UTC+1)	Hall 8'; Waldron 55'	Report		Stadium: St. James Park; Attendance: 546; Referee: Matthew Scholes

13 August 2025	Rochdale	2–1	Burnley U21	Rochdale
13:00 BST (UTC+1)	Henderson 57'; Amantchi 78'	Report	McMahon-Brown 75'	Stadium: Spotland Stadium; Attendance: 1,452; Referee: Aaron Jackson

16 September 2025	Rochdale	3–2	Blackburn Rovers U21	Rochdale
19:00 BST (UTC+1)	McBride 7'; Gomez Mancini 53'; Burger 76'	Report	Houghton 12'; Wood 33'	Stadium: Spotland Stadium; Attendance: 1,135; Referee: Gareth Thomas

16 September 2025	Solihull Moors	0–0 (5–4 p)	Burnley U21	Solihull
19:00 BST (UTC+1)		Report		Stadium: Damson Park; Attendance: 476; Referee: Declan Brown
	Penalties
	Bowen (penalty scored); Tipton (penalty scored); McFarlane (penalty scored); Jackson (penalty scored); Whyte-Hall (penalty scored)		(penalty scored) Bevan; (penalty scored) Clark; (penalty scored) Campbell; (penalty scored) Pouani; (penalty missed) Pimlott

16 September 2025	Brackley Town	2–1	Manchester United U21	Brackley
19:30 BST (UTC+1)	Waldron 7'; Hall 25'	Report	Devaney 90+4'	Stadium: St. James Park; Attendance: 2,942; Referee: Kirsty Dowle

16 September 2025	Tamworth	2–1	Everton U21	Tamworth
19:45 BST (UTC+1)	Mols 15'; Lynch 86'	Report	Graham 66'	Stadium: The Lamb Ground; Attendance: 426; Referee: Richie Watkins

21 October 2025	Solihull Moors	1–0	Blackburn Rovers U21	Solihull
19:00 BST (UTC+1)	McFarlane 78'	Report		Stadium: Damson Park; Attendance: 275; Referee: Dale Baines

21 October 2025	Brackley Town	1–1 (2–4 p)	Everton U21	Brackley
19:45 BST (UTC+1)	Waldron 80'	Report	Davis 88'	Stadium: St. James Park; Attendance: 928; Referee: Harrison Blair
	Penalties
	Byrne (penalty scored); Hall (penalty missed); Lyttle (penalty missed); Roberts (penalty scored)		(penalty missed) Beaumont-Clark; (penalty scored) Finney; (penalty scored) Akarakiri; (penalty scored) Loney; (penalty scored) Benjamin

21 October 2025	Tamworth	4–0	Burnley U21	Tamworth
19:45 BST (UTC+1)	Enoru 1'; Sayer 63'; Mols 66'; Lynch 84'	Report		Stadium: The Lamb Ground; Attendance: 362; Referee: Melissa Burgin

28 October 2025	Rochdale	0–2	Manchester United U21	Rochdale
19:00 GMT (UTC+0)		Report	Obi 11'; Scanlon 90+4'	Stadium: Spotland Stadium; Attendance: 2,960; Referee: Aaron Jackson

25 November 2025	Rochdale	1–0	Everton U21	Rochdale
19:00 GMT (UTC+0)	Burger 51'	Report		Stadium: Spotland Stadium; Attendance: 635; Referee: Matthew Scholes

25 November 2025	Solihull Moors	4–1	Manchester United U21	Solihull
19:00 GMT (UTC+0)	Sonupe 42'; Lipsiuc 44'; Stevenson 53'; Bowen 90'	Report	Mantato 35'	Stadium: Damson Park; Attendance: 1,522; Referee: Matthew McQuillan

25 November 2025	Brackley Town	2–1	Burnley U21	Brackley
19:45 GMT (UTC+0)	Stewart 22'; Hall 24'	Report	Bevan 81'	Stadium: St. James Park; Attendance: 353; Referee: Richard Aspinall

25 November 2025	Tamworth	3–0	Blackburn Rovers U21	Tamworth
19:45 GMT (UTC+0)	Bates 3'; Curley 27'; Lynch 65'	Report		Stadium: The Lamb Ground; Attendance: 251; Referee: Gareth Thomas

16 December 2025	Tamworth	3–0	Manchester United U21	Tamworth
19:45 GMT (UTC+0)	Duku 4'; Lynch 15'; Enoru 73'	Report		Stadium: The Lamb Ground; Attendance: 1,022; Referee: Kavan Hurn

=== Group B ===
Pos	Div	Team	Pld	W	PW	PL	L	GF	GA	GD	Pts	Qualification
1	NL	Boreham Wood	4	4	0	0	0	13	4	+9	12	Advance to knockout stage
2	NL	Braintree Town	4	3	0	0	1	8	5	+3	9	Advance to knockout stage
3	NL	Wealdstone	4	3	0	0	1	6	4	+2	9	
4	NL	Forest Green Rovers	4	2	0	1	1	8	6	+2	7	
5	ACA	Nottingham Forest U21	4	2	0	0	2	3	3	0	6	
6	ACA	West Bromwich Albion U21	4	1	0	0	3	5	10	−5	3	
7	ACA	Leicester City U21	4	0	1	0	3	6	10	−4	2	
8	ACA	Wolverhampton Wanderers U21	4	0	0	0	4	5	12	−7	0	

Source: Premier League

12 August 2025	Boreham Wood	2–0	Nottingham Forest U21	Borehamwood
19:00 BST (UTC+1)	Clayden 65'; Rush 80'	Report		Stadium: Meadow Park; Attendance: 418; Referee: Harrison Blair

12 August 2025	Braintree Town	2–0	Leicester City U21	Braintree
19:00 BST (UTC+1)	Cooper 31'; Hubbard 62'	Report		Stadium: Cressing Road; Attendance: 291; Referee: George Laflin

12 August 2025	Wealdstone	2–1	Wolverhampton Wanderers U21	Ruislip
19:00 BST (UTC+1)	Hassan 12'; Tshikuna 19'	Report	Holman 4'	Stadium: Grosvenor Vale; Attendance: 215; Referee: Aji Ajibola

13 August 2025	Forest Green Rovers	3–1	West Bromwich Albion U21	Nailsworth
19:00 BST (UTC+1)	Marquez 29'; Knowles 60'; Conteh 86'	Report	Bostock 66'	Stadium: The New Lawn; Attendance: 417; Referee: Lewis Sandoe

9 September 2025	Boreham Wood	3–1	West Bromwich Albion U21	Borehamwood
19:00 BST (UTC+1)	Dixon 45+4'; Clayden 61'; Sousa 67'	Report	Ntege 36'	Stadium: Meadow Park; Attendance: 443; Referee: Sam Mulhall

16 September 2025	Braintree Town	1–0	Nottingham Forest U21	Braintree
19:00 BST (UTC+1)	Cooper 9'	Report		Stadium: Cressing Road; Attendance: 244; Referee: Callum Walchester

16 September 2025	Forest Green Rovers	3–2	Wolverhampton Wanderers U21	Nailsworth
19:00 BST (UTC+1)	Marquez 45+3'; Moore 62'; Cardwell 67'	Report	Mané 53'; Ángel 87'	Stadium: The New Lawn; Attendance: 317; Referee: Matthew Scholes

16 September 2025	Wealdstone	2–1	Leicester City U21	Ruislip
19:00 BST (UTC+1)	Hassan 24'; Kretzschmar 84'	Report	Briggs 37'	Stadium: Grosvenor Vale; Attendance: 226; Referee: Emily Heaslip

21 October 2025	Braintree Town	2–3	West Bromwich Albion U21	Braintree
19:00 BST (UTC+1)	Blackwell 12'; Davis 51'	Report	Mandey 36'; Mohammed 54'; McDonald 90+2'	Stadium: Cressing Road; Attendance: 169; Referee: Harry Wager

21 October 2025	Forest Green Rovers	2–2 (3–5 p)	Leicester City U21	Nailsworth
19:00 BST (UTC+1)	Haughton 11'; Marquez 70'	Report	Evans 9'; Onanaye 17'	Stadium: The New Lawn; Attendance: 340
	Penalties
	Marquez (penalty scored); Haughton (penalty missed); Balagizi (penalty scored); Bamba (penalty scored)		(penalty scored) Evans; (penalty scored) Aluko; (penalty scored) Daniels; (penalty scored) Richards; (penalty scored) Onanaye

21 October 2025	Wealdstone	0–2	Nottingham Forest U21	Ruislip
19:00 BST (UTC+1)		Report	Sillah 57', 90+2'	Stadium: Grosvenor Vale; Attendance: 168; Referee: Aaron Farmer

25 November 2025	Boreham Wood	4–3	Leicester City U21	Borehamwood
19:00 GMT (UTC+0)	Richardson 8', 38'; Norris 65' (pen.); Benton 70'	Report	Gray 17'; Evans 19'; Otchere 28'	Stadium: Meadow Park; Attendance: 404; Referee: Niall Smith

25 November 2025	Braintree Town	3–2	Wolverhampton Wanderers U21	Braintree
19:00 GMT (UTC+0)	Blackwell 9'; Kamara 66'; Emmanuel-Thomas 83'	Report	Edozie 28'; Pond 70'	Stadium: Cressing Road; Attendance: 206; Referee: Alan Dale

25 November 2025	Forest Green Rovers	0–1	Nottingham Forest U21	Nailsworth
19:00 GMT (UTC+0)		Report	Thompson 50'	Stadium: The New Lawn; Attendance: 265; Referee: Lewis Sandoe

25 November 2025	Wealdstone	2–0	West Bromwich Albion U21	Ruislip
19:00 GMT (UTC+0)	Olomola 3'; Nkrumah 60'	Report		Stadium: Grosvenor Vale; Attendance: 125; Referee: Charles Breakspear

2 December 2025	Boreham Wood	4–0	Wolverhampton Wanderers U21	Borehamwood
19:00 GMT (UTC+0)	Norris 1'; Richardson 44'; Benton 56'; Booty 90+1'	Report		Stadium: Meadow Park; Attendance: 402; Referee: Andrew Humphries

=== Group C ===
Pos	Div	Team	Pld	W	PW	PL	L	GF	GA	GD	Pts	Qualification
1	ACA	West Ham United U21	4	3	1	0	0	13	4	+9	11	Advance to knockout stage
2	NL	Truro City	4	3	0	0	1	7	5	+2	9	Advance to knockout stage
3	NL	Woking	4	2	1	0	1	5	4	+1	8	
4	ACA	Brighton & Hove Albion U21	4	2	0	1	1	5	6	−1	7	
5	NL	Aldershot Town	4	1	0	1	2	7	11	−4	4	
6	NL	Sutton United	4	1	0	1	2	8	13	−5	4	
7	ACA	Fulham U21	4	1	0	0	3	8	5	+3	3	
8	ACA	Southampton U21	4	0	1	0	3	7	12	−5	2	

Source: Premier League

12 August 2025	Aldershot Town	1–2	Brighton & Hove Albion U21	Aldershot
19:00 BST (UTC+1)	Ghandour 71'	Report	Hargreaves 78' (o.g.); Nti 81'	Stadium: The Recreation Ground; Attendance: 576; Referee: Harry Wager

12 August 2025	Sutton United	0–7	Fulham U21	Sutton
19:00 BST (UTC+1)		Report	Olyott 22', 74'; Loupalo-Bi 47', 51', 81'; Works 72'; Zepa 87'	Stadium: Gander Green Lane; Attendance: 806; Referee: Kirsty Dowle

13 August 2025	Truro City	3–2	Southampton U21	Truro
19:00 BST (UTC+1)	Love-Holmes 7'; Jephcott 38'; Johnson-Fisher 85'	Report	Love-Holmes 20' (o.g.); Armitage 69'	Stadium: Truro City Stadium; Attendance: 1,909; Referee: Elliott Swallow

13 August 2025	Woking	0–2	West Ham United U21	Woking
19:00 BST (UTC+1)		Report	Orford 90'; Kanté 90+7'	Stadium: Kingfield Stadium; Attendance: 241; Referee: Aaron Farmer

16 September 2025	Sutton United	1–2	Brighton & Hove Albion U21	Sutton
19:00 BST (UTC+1)	Nadesan 87'	Report	Nti 66'; Barclay 74'	Stadium: Gander Green Lane; Attendance: 437; Referee: Wayne Cartmel

16 September 2025	Truro City	1–0	Fulham U21	Truro
19:00 BST (UTC+1)	Jephcott 71'	Report		Stadium: Truro City Stadium; Attendance: 1,114; Referee: Ross Martin

16 September 2025	Woking	2–1	Southampton U21	Woking
19:00 BST (UTC+1)	Kelly 29'; Okunola 33' (o.g.)	Report	Sillah Dibaga 54'	Stadium: Kingfield Stadium; Attendance: 212; Referee: Jason Richardson

21 October 2025	Aldershot Town	3–3 (2–4 p)	Southampton U21	Aldershot
19:00 BST (UTC+1)	Ghandour 8', 77'; Nelson 40'	Report	Sesay 5'; Dipepa 22'; Merry 59'	Stadium: The Recreation Ground; Attendance: 371; Referee: Wayne Cartmel
	Penalties
	Ghandour (penalty scored); Mullins (penalty missed); Nelson (penalty scored); Penney (penalty missed)		(penalty scored) Merry; (penalty scored) Daley; (penalty scored) Dobson-Ventura; (penalty scored) Nutter

21 October 2025	Sutton United	3–3 (3–4 p)	West Ham United U21	Sutton
19:00 BST (UTC+1)	Boutin 59'; Harris 85'; Njoku 90+1'	Report	Adiele 35', 37'; Ajala 88' (pen.)	Stadium: Gander Green Lane; Attendance: 633; Referee: Paul Howard
	Penalties
	Harris (penalty scored); Njoku (penalty missed); Muller (penalty scored); Bell (penalty scored); Dabre (penalty missed)		(penalty scored) Golambeckis; (penalty scored) Ajala; (penalty scored) Adiele; (penalty scored) Battrum

21 October 2025	Truro City	3–0	Brighton & Hove Albion U21	Truro
19:00 BST (UTC+1)	Sanogo 25', 90+6'; Johnson-Fisher 56'	Report		Stadium: Truro City Stadium; Attendance: 1,297; Referee: Lewis Sandoe

21 October 2025	Woking	2–0	Fulham U21	Woking
19:00 BST (UTC+1)	Andrews 74'; Turner 82'	Report		Stadium: Kingfield Stadium; Attendance: 262; Referee: Isaac Searle

25 November 2025	Aldershot Town	2–1	Fulham U21	Aldershot
19:00 GMT (UTC+0)	Ghandour 38'; Henry 45+2'	Report	Kusi-Asare 42'	Stadium: The Recreation Ground; Attendance: 227; Referee: Aaron Jackson

25 November 2025	Sutton United	4–1	Southampton U21	Sutton
19:00 GMT (UTC+0)	Simper 9'; Jennings 57'; Njoku 90+3'; Dabre 90+6'	Report	Kakay 27'	Stadium: Gander Green Lane; Attendance: 505; Referee: Kirsty Dowle

25 November 2025	Truro City	0–3	West Ham United U21	Truro
19:00 GMT (UTC+0)		Report	Earthy 15'; Marshall 24'; Kanté 83'	Stadium: Truro City Stadium; Attendance: 2,266; Referee: Harrison Blair

25 November 2025	Woking	1–1 (4–2 p)	Brighton & Hove Albion U21	Woking
19:00 GMT (UTC+0)	Kelly 90' (pen.)	Report	Ibrahim 56'	Stadium: Kingfield Stadium; Attendance: 174; Referee: Aaron Farmer
	Penalties
	Sanderson (penalty scored); Kelly (penalty scored); Turner (penalty scored); Andrews (penalty scored)		Belmont (penalty missed); West (penalty scored); Ibrahim (penalty missed); Kasvosve (penalty scored)

23 December 2025	Aldershot Town	1–5	West Ham United U21	Aldershot
19:00 GMT (UTC+0)	Rai 49'	Report	Ajala 6'; Golambeckis 12'; Orford 25'; Earthy 62'; Battrum 90+1'	Stadium: The Recreation Ground; Attendance: 729; Referee: Harrison Blair

=== Group D ===
Pos	Div	Team	Pld	W	PW	PL	L	GF	GA	GD	Pts	Qualification
1	NL	Boston United	4	3	0	0	1	11	4	+7	9	Advance to knockout stage
2	NL	FC Halifax Town	4	2	1	1	0	6	2	+4	9	Advance to knockout stage
3	ACA	Newcastle United U21	4	2	0	1	1	7	6	+1	7	
4	NL	Scunthorpe United	4	2	0	0	2	8	8	0	6	
5	ACA	Leeds United U21	4	2	0	0	2	6	8	−2	6	
6	ACA	Sunderland U21	4	1	1	1	1	5	8	−3	6	
7	ACA	Middlesbrough U21	4	1	0	0	3	6	7	−1	3	
8	NL	Gateshead	4	0	1	0	3	4	10	−6	2	

Source: Premier League

9 August 2025	Boston United	2–1	Middlesbrough U21	Boston
13:00 BST (UTC+1)	John-Lewis 61' (pen.); Donnelly 73'	Report	Howells 50'	Stadium: Boston Community Stadium; Attendance: 733; Referee: Matthew McQuillan

12 August 2025	Boston United	4–0	Leeds United U21	Boston
19:00 BST (UTC+1)	Grist 47'; Donnelly 62', 90+4'; Lankshear 65'	Report		Stadium: Boston Community Stadium; Attendance: 830; Referee: Alan Dale

12 August 2025	Scunthorpe United	2–3	Sunderland U21	Scunthorpe
19:00 BST (UTC+1)	Ubaezuonu 6'; Dawson 30'	Report	Poveda 45+1'; Samuel-Ogunsuyi 71'; Whittaker 90+2'	Stadium: Glanford Park; Attendance: 979; Referee: Gareth Thomas

13 August 2025	Gateshead	3–4	Newcastle United U21	Gateshead
19:30 BST (UTC+1)	Adom 11'; Chapman 21'; Bone 49'	Report	Neave 15'; Fitzgerald 70'; Richardson 82' (o.g.); Heffernan 90'	Stadium: Gateshead International Stadium; Attendance: 505; Referee: Richard Aspinall

9 September 2025	FC Halifax Town	2–1	Middlesbrough U21	Halifax
19:00 BST (UTC+1)	Cooke 43'; Devonport 84'	Report	Finch 39'	Stadium: The Shay; Attendance: 207; Referee: Declan Brown

16 September 2025	Boston United	4–0	Sunderland U21	Boston
19:00 BST (UTC+1)	Kindon 24' (o.g.); John-Lewis 28'; Cropper 38'; Donnelly 38'	Report		Stadium: Boston Community Stadium; Attendance: 486; Referee: Aaron Bannister

16 September 2025	Scunthorpe United	1–3	Leeds United U21	Scunthorpe
19:00 BST (UTC+1)	Ubaezuonu 47'	Report	Gray 34', 73', 88'	Stadium: Glanford Park; Attendance: 1,016; Referee: Jamie O'Connor

17 September 2025	Gateshead	0–2	Middlesbrough U21	Gateshead
19:30 BST (UTC+1)		Report	Carbon 5'; Bakre 52'	Stadium: Gateshead International Stadium; Attendance: 226; Referee: Aaron Jackson

8 October 2025	Boston United	1–3	Newcastle United U21	Boston
19:00 BST (UTC+1)	Maguire 47'	Report	Neave 16' (pen.), 30', 40'	Stadium: Boston Community Stadium; Attendance: 630; Referee: Emily Heaslip

21 October 2025	FC Halifax Town	3–0	Leeds United U21	Halifax
19:00 BST (UTC+1)	Devonport 25', 52', 80'	Report		Stadium: The Shay; Attendance: 524; Referee: Matthew McQuillan

21 October 2025	Gateshead	1–1 (4–3 p)	Sunderland U21	Gateshead
19:30 BST (UTC+1)	Telford 41'	Report	Ba 60'	Stadium: Gateshead International Stadium; Attendance: 158; Referee: Richard Aspinall
	Penalties
	Home (penalty scored); John (penalty scored); Hurst (penalty missed); Bone (penalty missed); Flint (penalty scored); Nouble (penalty scored)		(penalty scored) Middlemas; (penalty missed) Jones; (penalty missed) Matete; (penalty scored) Moore; (penalty scored) Ba; (penalty missed) Walsh

28 October 2025	Scunthorpe United	3–2	Middlesbrough U21	Scunthorpe
19:00 GMT (UTC+0)	Howe 38'; Sellars-Fleming 65'; Beck 88'	Report	Finch 77'; Smith 82'	Stadium: Glanford Park; Attendance: 428; Referee: Andrew Miller

25 November 2025	FC Halifax Town	1–1 (3–5 p)	Sunderland U21	Halifax
19:00 GMT (UTC+0)	Tarima 17'	Report	Ba 63'	Stadium: The Shay; Attendance: 201; Referee: Paul Marsden
	Penalties
	Alimi-Adetoro (penalty scored); Hugill (penalty scored); Mills (penalty scored); Emmerson (penalty missed)		Jones (penalty scored); Middlemas (penalty scored); Garagusian (penalty scored); Jones (penalty scored); Lightfoot (penalty scored)

26 November 2025	Gateshead	0–3	Leeds United U21	Gateshead
19:30 GMT (UTC+0)		Report	Pickles 26', 81'; Render 51'	Stadium: Gateshead International Stadium; Attendance: 120; Referee: Gareth Rhodes

2 December 2025	Scunthorpe United	2–0	Newcastle United U21	Scunthorpe
19:00 GMT (UTC+0)	Oteh 33'; Howe 80'	Report		Stadium: Glanford Park; Attendance: 369; Referee: James Bancroft

16 December 2025	FC Halifax Town	0–0 (7–6 p)	Newcastle United U21	Halifax
19:00 GMT (UTC+0)		Report		Stadium: The Shay; Attendance: 246; Referee: Callum Jones
	Penalties
	Harris (penalty scored); Mills (penalty scored); Alimi-Adetoro (penalty scored); Jenkins (penalty scored); Kawa (penalty missed); Johnson (penalty missed); Cummings (penalty scored); Latty-Fairweather (penalty scored); Emmerson (penalty scored)		(penalty scored) Harrison; (penalty scored) Parkinson; (penalty missed) Brayson; (penalty scored) Bailey; (penalty scored) McArthur; (penalty missed) Palmer; (penalty scored) Charlton; (penalty scored) Heffernan; (penalty missed) Thompson

== Quarter-finals ==
Teams who played in the same group in the group stage are kept apart.

27 January 2026	Boston United	1–2	West Ham United U21	Boston
19:00 GMT (UTC+0)	Hiwula 28'	Report	Battrum 13'; Adiele 85'	Stadium: Boston Community Stadium; Attendance: 688; Referee: Richard Eley

27 January 2026	Boreham Wood	5–2	Brackley Town	Borehamwood
19:00 GMT (UTC+0)	Rush 4', 18'; Ilesanmi 32'; Clayden 54'; Coxe 90+4'	Report	Hall 60'; Roberts 77'	Stadium: Meadow Park; Attendance: 509; Referee: Wayne Cartmel

27 January 2026	Truro City	1–1 (3–0 p)	Braintree Town	Truro
19:00 GMT (UTC+0)	Charsley 78'	Report	Terry 90+5'	Stadium: Truro City Stadium; Attendance: 1,023; Referee: Harrison Blair
	Penalties
	Harvey (penalty scored); Dean (penalty scored); Jephcott (penalty scored)		(penalty missed) Walker; (penalty missed) Vennings; (penalty missed) Emmanuel-Thomas

27 January 2026	Tamworth	1–0	FC Halifax Town	Tamworth
19:45 GMT (UTC+0)	Maher 57'	Report		Stadium: The Lamb Ground; Attendance: 476; Referee: Richie Watkins

== Semi-finals ==
West Ham United U21 were the only remaining semi-finalist who plays in Premier League 2. The semi-finals were scheduled to be played on 17 February.

17 February 2026	Boreham Wood	2–0	Truro City	Borehamwood
19:30 GMT (UTC+0)	Booty 85'; Rush 90+10'	Report		Stadium: Meadow Park; Attendance: 678; Referee: Andrew Humphries

17 February 2026	Tamworth	1–3	West Ham United U21	Tamworth
19:30 GMT (UTC+0)	Maher 65'	Report	Fearon 4'; Ajala 90+3', 90+7'	Stadium: The Lamb Ground; Attendance: 1,341; Referee: James Oldham

== Final ==
17 March 2026
19:00 GMT (UTC+0)

Boreham Wood	2–2	West Ham United U21
Abdulmalik 49'; Henry 90+3'	Report	Orford 26'; Landers 45'
Penalties
Brunt (penalty scored); Rush (penalty scored); Henry (penalty scored); Coxe (penalty scored); Sousa (penalty scored); Bush (penalty scored); O'Connell (penalty scored)	7–6	(penalty scored) Ajala; (penalty scored) Orford; (penalty scored) Golambeckis; (penalty scored) Briggs; (penalty scored) Cummings; (penalty scored) Battrum; (penalty missed) Caliste

Meadow Park, Borehamwood
Attendance: 2,803
Referee: Elliott Swallow
