= Emmanuel Dieseruvwe =

English footballer (born 1995)

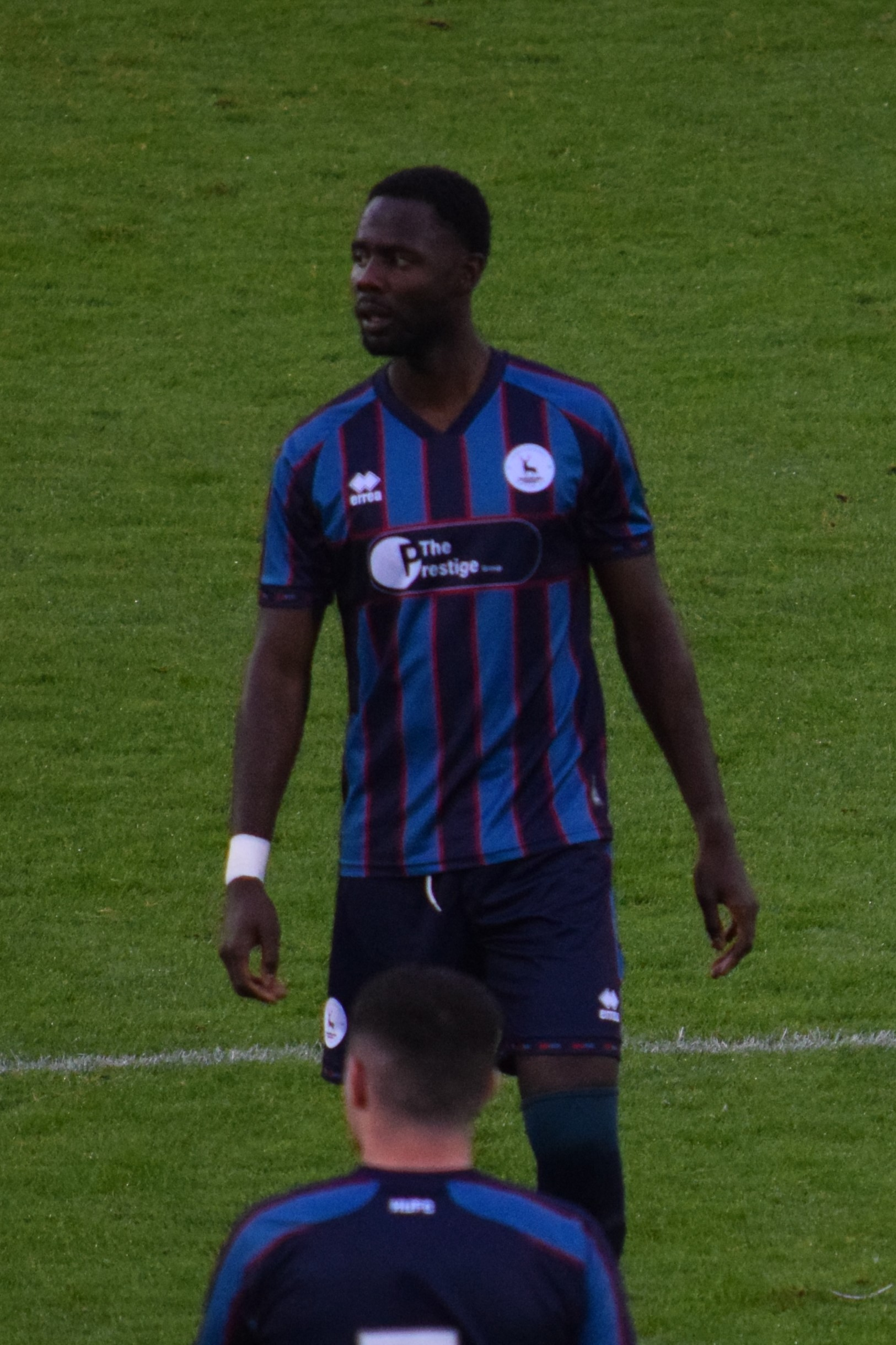
- Dieseruvwe playing for Hartlepool United in 2023

Personal information
- Full name: Emmanuel Aghogho Oluwafemi Dieseruvwe
- Date of birth: 20 February 1995 (age 31)
- Place of birth: Leeds, England
- Height: 6 ft 5 in (1.95 m)
- Position: Forward

Team information
- Current team: Rochdale
- Number: 9

Youth career
- –2013: Sheffield Wednesday

Senior career*
| Years | Team | Apps | (Gls) |
| 2013–2015 | Sheffield Wednesday | 0 | (0) |
| 2013 | → Hyde (loan) | 7 | (0) |
| 2013 | → Fleetwood Town (loan) | 4 | (0) |
| 2015 | → Chesterfield (loan) | 1 | (0) |
| 2015–2016 | Chesterfield | 25 | (0) |
| 2016 | → Mansfield Town (loan) | 10 | (1) |
| 2016–2017 | Kidderminster Harriers | 29 | (4) |
| 2017 | → Boston United (loan) | 7 | (1) |
| 2017–2021 | Salford City | 81 | (9) |
| 2018 | → Chester (loan) | 7 | (0) |
| 2020 | → Oldham Athletic (loan) | 4 | (0) |
| 2021–2022 | Tranmere Rovers | 6 | (0) |
| 2022 | → Grimsby Town (loan) | 13 | (5) |
| 2022–2023 | FC Halifax Town | 42 | (13) |
| 2023–2025 | Hartlepool United | 85 | (39) |
| 2025– | Rochdale | 40 | (26) |

International career
| 2024 | England C | 1 | (0) |
- * Club domestic league appearances and goals as of 20:46, 10 May 2026 (UTC)

Emmanuel Aghogho Oluwafemi Dieseruvwe (born 20 February 1995) is an English professional footballer who plays as a forward for EFL League Two club Rochdale.

Beginning his career with Sheffield Wednesday, Dieseruvwe has played for Chesterfield, Salford City and Tranmere Rovers with loan spells at Hyde, Fleetwood Town, Mansfield Town, Kidderminster Harriers, Boston United, Chester, Oldham Athletic, Grimsby Town and FC Halifax Town.

== Club career ==
=== Sheffield Wednesday ===
Born in Leeds, England, Dieseruvwe started his career at Sheffield Wednesday. In 2013, having progressed through the Yorkshire club's youth academy, Dieseruvwe signed his first professional contract at the club.

After being told by Manager Dave Jones that he needed to be loaned out for first team football, Dieseruvwe was loaned to Hyde on a month-long youth loan deal.

After making seven appearances for Hyde, Dieseruvwe joined Fleetwood Town on a month-long youth loan deal. Dieseruvwe made his Football League debut for Fleetwood Town on 2 November 2013, as an 83rd-minute substitute in a 4–1 win over Newport County. Soon after, Dieseruvwe's loan spell at Fleetwood was extended until 2 February 2014. After making six appearances for Fleetwood Town, it was announced on 20 January 2014 that Dieseruvwe was to return to Sheffield Wednesday.

=== Chesterfield ===
After expressing his desire to be loaned out in determination of making a breakthrough at Sheffield Wednesday, Dieseruvwe joined Chesterfield on 3 January 2015 on a youth loan deal. Upon moving to Chesterfield, Dieseruvwe described the move as "a big chance" and "another step up". On 17 January 2015, Dieseruvwe made his Chesterfield debut, in a 3–1 loss against Swindon Town. Soon after, Dieseruvwe told of being settled at Chesterfield.

On 2 February 2015, Dieseruvwe made his loan move permanent by signing an 18-month contract. Dieseruvwe's first game after signing for the club on a permanent basis came on 7 February 2015, coming on as a substitute for Armand Gnanduillet, in a 1–0 win over Notts County. On 11 August 2015, Dieseruvwe scored his first goal for Chesterfield, the equaliser in an eventual 3–1 defeat to Carlisle United, though he was later sent off in extra-time.

=== Kidderminster Harriers ===
He then joined National League North team Kidderminster Harriers, signing a one-year contract, with manager John Eustace saying the club was "excited" with Dieseruvwe's signing. He moved on loan to Boston United in March 2017, making his début against Worcester City. He was released by Kidderminster in May upon the expiration of his contract.

=== Salford City ===
He then signed in May 2017 for Salford City. On 11 May 2019, Dieseruvwe opened the scoring in the 2019 National League play-off final, with Salford going on to win the game against AFC Fylde 3–0 and reach the English Football League for the first time in the club's history. On 3 August, Dieseruvwe scored Salford's first ever Football League goal, which came in the first match of the 2019–20 season against Stevenage. He went on to score a second goal that day as the 'Ammies' recorded a 2–0 victory. On 8 December 2020, he came on as a substitute and scored two goals in the EFL Trophy second round fixture against Leicester City U21s, a game which went to a penalty shoot-out after a 3–3 draw; Dieseruvwe missed Salford's first penalty and ultimately exited the competition 6–5 in the shootout.

==== Loans and departure ====
On 26 October 2018, he joined National League North side Chester on loan for one month. At the end of the 2018–19 season he extended his contract with Salford, signing a new two-year contract. Dieseruvwe joined Oldham Athletic on loan on 10 January 2020 for the rest of the 2019–20 season.

At the end of the 2020–21 season, it was announced that he would be leaving the club.

=== Tranmere Rovers ===
On 28 June 2021, Dieseruvwe signed for fellow League Two side Tranmere Rovers on a one-year deal.

Before his loan spell had even ended, on 10 May 2022 Dieseruwve didn't make Tranmere's retained list for the 2022–23 season, with the club announcing he was to be released at the end of his contract.

==== Loan to Grimsby Town ====
On 18 February 2022, Dieseruvwe joined National League side Grimsby Town on loan for the remainder of the 2021–22 season.

On the final day of the 2021–22 season, Dieseruwve scored a hat-trick for Grimsby in a 4–4 draw away at Eastleigh that saw the Mariners progress into the National League play-offs. On 23 May, he scored the winning goal in extra time as Grimsby knocked Notts County out of the play-offs at Meadow Lane. He scored again in the play-off semi-final in a 5–4 away victory over Wrexham to progress into the play-off final at the London Stadium.

Dieseruvwe played in the 2022 National League play-off final as Grimsby beat Solihull Moors 2–1 at the London Stadium to return to the Football League.

=== FC Halifax Town ===
On 1 July 2022, Dieseruvwe signed for FC Halifax Town ahead of the 2022–23 season following his release by Tranmere. He scored his first two goals for The Shaymen in a 2–0 home win against Gateshead on 13 September. Dieseruvwe was a member of the FC Halifax team that won the 2022–23 FA Trophy, however, he missed the final through suspension.

Dieseruvwe finished as top scorer for FC Halifax Town in season 2022–23 with 13 goals. It was announced on 2 July 2023 that he had rejected a new contract offer and had left the club.

=== Hartlepool United ===
On 4 July 2023, Dieseruvwe signed for Hartlepool United ahead of the 2023–24 season following his release by FC Halifax. Dieseruvwe scored a brace on his Hartlepool debut in a 2–1 home win against Gateshead. Five goals across the course of August saw him awarded the league's Player of the Month award. On 20 February 2024, Dieseruvwe scored his 20th and 21st goal of the season in a 3–2 victory against Altrincham, becoming the first Hartlepool player to score 20 or more goals in a season since the 2008–09 season. He finished the 2023–24 season with a career best of 25 goals in all competitions.

On 5 October 2024, Dieseruvwe scored his first hat-trick for Pools in a 4–3 home win against Sutton United. This made him the first player in the club's history to score a hat-trick in a league game after coming on a substitute. He entered double digits for the 2024–25 season with a goal in a 4–3 away win against Solihull Moors on 23 November. At the end of the season, he was offered a new contract with Hartlepool.

=== Rochdale ===
On 4 July 2025, Dieseruvwe opted to sign for National League club Rochdale on a two-year deal. Dieseruvwe scored twice on his debut, in a 2–0 win against Boreham Wood. Having scored a total of five goals in the opening month of the season, he was named National League Player of the Month for August 2025. On 10 May 2026, Dieseruvwe scored a late equaliser in the seventh minute of injury time in the 2026 National League play-off final against Boreham Wood; Rochdale won the penalty shootout winning the club promotion to League Two. He scored 26 league goals in his debut season for the club and, as a result, was named in the 2025–26 National League Team of the Year.

== International career ==
Born in England, Dieseruvwe is of Nigerian descent. On 6 March 2024, Dieseruvwe was called up to the England C squad for an upcoming friendly against the Wales C team. He was a 61st minute substitute for England in that match in a 1–0 defeat.

== Career statistics ==
As of match played 10 May 2026

Appearances and goals by club, season and competition
| Club | Season | League | | | FA Cup | | League Cup | | Other | | Total | |
| Club | Season | Division | Apps | Goals | Apps | Goals | Apps | Goals | Apps | Goals | Apps | Goals |
|---|---|---|---|---|---|---|---|---|---|---|---|---|
| Hyde (loan) | 2013–14 | Conference Premier | 7 | 0 | 0 | 0 | — | | 0 | 0 | 7 | 0 |
| Fleetwood Town (loan) | 2013–14 | League Two | 4 | 0 | 1 | 0 | 0 | 0 | 1 (Note: Appearance(s) in Football League Trophy) | 0 | 6 | 0 |
| Chesterfield (loan) | 2014–15 | League One | 1 | 0 | 1 | 0 | 0 | 0 | 0 | 0 | 2 | 0 |
| Chesterfield | 2014–15 | League One | 8 | 0 | 0 | 0 | 0 | 0 | 0 | 0 | 8 | 0 |
| Chesterfield | 2015–16 | League One | 16 | 0 | 1 | 0 | 1 | 1 | 1 | 0 | 19 | 1 |
| Chesterfield | Total | | 25 | 0 | 2 | 0 | 1 | 1 | 1 | 0 | 29 | 1 |
| Mansfield Town (loan) | 2015–16 | League Two | 10 | 1 | — | | — | | 0 | 0 | 10 | 1 |
| Kidderminster Harriers | 2016–17 | National League North | 29 | 4 | 2 | 1 | — | | 2 (Note: Appearance(s) in FA Trophy) | 1 | 33 | 6 |
| Boston United (loan) | 2016–17 | National League North | 7 | 1 | — | | — | | — | | 7 | 1 |
| Salford City | 2017–18 | National League North | 26 | 3 | 0 | 0 | — | | — | | 26 | 3 |
| Salford City | 2018–19 | National League | 21 | 3 | 0 | 0 | — | | 6 (Note: Four appearances, three goals in FA Trophy and two appearances and one goal in National League Play-offs) | 4 | 27 | 7 |
| Salford City | 2019–20 | League Two | 20 | 3 | 2 | 0 | 1 | 0 | 4 (Note: Appearance(s) in EFL Trophy) | 0 | 27 | 3 |
| Salford City | 2020–21 | League Two | 14 | 0 | 2 | 1 | 0 | 0 | 4 (Note: Includes appearance in 2019–20 EFL Trophy final which was postponed until 13 March 2021 due to the COVID-19 pandemic.) | 3 | 20 | 4 |
| Salford City | Total | | 81 | 9 | 4 | 1 | 1 | 0 | 14 | 7 | 100 | 18 |
| Chester (loan) | 2018–19 | National League North | 7 | 0 | — | | — | | — | | 7 | 0 |
| Oldham Athletic (loan) | 2019–20 | League Two | 4 | 0 | — | | — | | — | | 4 | 0 |
| Tranmere Rovers | 2021–22 | League Two | 6 | 0 | 2 | 0 | 1 | 0 | 3 | 0 | 12 | 0 |
| Grimsby Town (loan) | 2021–22 | National League | 13 | 5 | 0 | 0 | — | | 2 (Note: Appearance(s) in National League play-offs) | 2 | 15 | 7 |
| FC Halifax Town | 2022–23 | National League | 42 | 13 | 1 | 0 | — | | 0 | 0 | 43 | 13 |
| Hartlepool United | 2023–24 | National League | 39 | 23 | 1 | 0 | — | | 1 | 2 | 41 | 25 |
| Hartlepool United | 2024–25 | National League | 46 | 16 | 2 | 1 | — | | 1 | 0 | 49 | 17 |
| Hartlepool United | Total | | 85 | 39 | 3 | 1 | 0 | 0 | 2 | 2 | 90 | 42 |
| Rochdale | 2025–26 | National League | 40 | 26 | 1 | 1 | — | | 2 | 1 | 43 | 28 |
| Career total | | | 357 | 98 | 16 | 4 | 3 | 1 | 27 | 13 | 400 | 116 |

== Honours ==
Salford City

- National League play-offs: 2019
- National League North 2017–18
- EFL Trophy: 2019–20

Grimsby Town

- National League play-offs: 2022

FC Halifax Town

- FA Trophy: 2022–23

Rochdale

- National League play-offs: 2026

Individual

- National League Team of the Season: 2025–26
- National League Player of the Month: August 2023, August 2025
