= Leon Ayinde =

Irish footballer (born 2004)

Personal information
- Full name: Leon Zion Oluwatobi Ayinde
- Date of birth: 5 September 2004 (age 22)
- Place of birth: Cork, Ireland
- Height: 1.78 m (5 ft 10 in)
- Position: Winger

Team information
- Current team: Doncaster Rovers
- Number: 11

Youth career
- St. Mary's
- 2018–2023: Cork City
- 2023–2026: Ipswich Town

Senior career*
Years	Team	Apps	(Gls)
2023–2026	Ipswich Town	0	(0)
2024–2025	→ Rochdale (loan)	27	(2)
2026	→ Boreham Wood (loan)	13	(2)
2026–	Doncaster Rovers	6	(1)

International career^{‡}
- Republic of Ireland U17
2025–2026	Republic of Ireland U21	5	(1)
- * Club domestic league appearances and goals as of 18:39, 20 May 2026 (UTC) ‡ National team caps and goals as of 23:56, 17 November 2026 (UTC)

Leon Zion Oluwatobi Ayinde (born 5 September 2004) is an Irish professional footballer who plays as a winger for EFL League One club Doncaster Rovers and is a Republic of Ireland youth international.

Ayinde was born in Cork and played youth football with Leeds AFC Cork, St. Mary's and Cork City before being signed by Ipswich Town. He has also spent time on loan with Rochdale.

== Youth career ==
Ayinde played schoolboy football with Leeds AFC Cork, winning the Cork Schoolboys League U13 player of the year followed by a spell with Munster Senior League side St. Mary's, before joining by local League of Ireland club Cork City at Under-14 level.

== Club career ==
=== Cork City ===
On 28 March 2022 Ayinde made his senior debut for Cork at the age of 17 in the Munster Senior Cup in a 3–0 win over Midleton.

=== Ipswich Town ===
On 31 January 2023, Ayinde was signed by EFL Championship side Ipswich Town. Ayinde made his first appearance on the bench for Ipswich on 9 August 2023 in an EFL Cup match vs Bristol Rovers.

==== Rochdale (loan) ====
On 30 August 2024, it was announced that Ayinde had joined National League side Rochdale on loan for half a season. On January 8 it was announced that Anyinde's loan had been extended until the end of the season.

==== Boreham Wood (loan) ====
On 13 February 2026, Ayinde joined National League side Boreham Wood on loan until the end of the season. Ayinde played in the 2025–26 National League Cup final, as Boreham Wood defeated the West Ham United U21s on penalties to win the cup.

=== Doncaster Rovers ===
On 20 May 2026, Ayinde agreed to join League One club Doncaster Rovers on a two-year deal from 1 July.

== International career ==
Ayinde is eligible to play for both the Republic of Ireland and Nigeria.

In October 2025 Ayinde received his first call-up to the Republic of Ireland U21s, with him making his debut in his hometown of Cork at Turners Cross in a Euros qualifier against Slovakia. Ayinde was brought on as a substitute in the 68th minute however after only six minutes he had to be taken off due to an injury.

== Career statistics ==
As of end of 2025–26 season

Appearances and goals by club, season and competition
Club	Season	League			National cup (Note: Includes FAI Cup, FA Cup)		League cup (Note: Includes EFL Cup, National League Cup)		Other		Total	
Club	Season	Division	Apps	Goals	Apps	Goals	Apps	Goals	Apps	Goals	Apps	Goals
Cork City	2022	LOI First Division	0	0	0	0	—		2 (Note: Appearances in Munster Senior Cup)	0	2	0
Ipswich Town	2023–24	Championship	0	0	0	0	0	0	—		0	0
Ipswich Town	2024–25	Premier League	0	0	—		—		—		0	0
Ipswich Town	2025–26	Championship	0	0	0	0	0	0	—		0	0
Ipswich Town	Total		0	0	0	0	0	0	0	0	0	0
Rochdale (loan)	2024–25	National League	27	2	0	0	2	1	5 (Note: 4 Appearances in FA Trophy and 1 Appearance in National League Play-Offs)	0	34	3
Boreham Wood (loan)	2025–26	National League	13	2	0	0	2	0	3 (Note: Appearance(s) in National League play-offs)	0	18	2
Doncaster Rovers	2026–27	EFL League One	0	0	0	0	0	0	0	0	0	0
Career total			40	4	0	0	4	1	10	0	54	5

== Honours ==
Boreham Wood

- National League Cup: 2025–26
