= Ted Curd =

English association football player

Personal information
- Full name: Ted Noah Curd
- Date of birth: 14 February 2006 (age 20)
- Place of birth: Kingston upon Thames, England
- Height: 1.90 m (6 ft 3 in)
- Position: Goalkeeper

Team information
- Current team: Boreham Wood (on loan from Chelsea)

Youth career
- 2015–2023: Chelsea

Senior career*
Years	Team	Apps	(Gls)
2023–	Chelsea	0	(0)
2023–2024	→ Hashtag United (loan)	11	(0)
2024–2025	→ Hampton & Richmond Borough (loan)	23	(0)
2025–2026	→ Boreham Wood (loan)	24	(0)
2026–	→ Boreham Wood (loan)	5	(0)

International career^{‡}
2021–2022	England U16	5	(0)
2022–2023	England U17	7	(0)
2023	England U18	1	(0)
2024	England U19	1	(0)
- * Club domestic league appearances and goals as of 23:00, 1 November 2026 (UTC) ‡ National team caps and goals as of 16:20, 10 October 2024 (UTC)

Ted Noah Curd (born 14 February 2006) is an English professional footballer who plays as a goalkeeper for National League club Boreham Wood, on loan from Premier League club Chelsea. He is an England youth international.

== Club career ==
Curd joined up with Chelsea at under-9 level. He signed his first professional contract with the club in February 2023. Later that year he joined Isthmian League side Hashtag United on loan, having reportedly requested the move after watching the club's YouTube videos from a young age. He made his league debut for Hashtag United in September 2023 against Kingstonian, earning the man-of-the-match award on debut. On 7 January 2024, after 16 starts for Hashtag United and 4 clean sheets, Curd was recalled from his loan by Chelsea.

On 30 June 2024, Curd was sent on loan to National League South club Hampton & Richmond Borough for the 2024–25 season. He returned to Chelsea on 15 January 2025. Curd was an unused substitute during their UEFA Conference League semi-final victory against Djurgården.

Curd joined Boreham Wood on loan for the 2025–26 campaign and was a member of the side that won the National League Cup. At the end of that season he started in the 2026 National League play-off final at Wembley Stadium which saw them lose on a penalty shoot-out against Rochdale. On 3 September 2026, the loan was extended for a season.

== International career ==
Curd was a member of the England under-17 team that finished fifth at the 2023 UEFA European Under-17 Championship and made his only appearance of the tournament in a goalless group stage draw against Switzerland. He was also called-up for the 2023 FIFA U-17 World Cup.

Having been capped at England U18 level, Curd made his England U19 debut during a 2–1 defeat to Portugal in Marbella on 9 October 2024.

== Career statistics ==
As of match played 10 May 2026.

Appearances and goals by club, season and competition
Club	Season	League			FA Cup		EFL Cup		Other		Total	
Club	Season	Division	Apps	Goals	Apps	Goals	Apps	Goals	Apps	Goals	Apps	Goals
Chelsea U21	2023–24	—			—		—		0	0	0	0
Chelsea U21	2024–25	—			—		—		0	0	0	0
Chelsea U21	2025–26	—			—		—		1 (Note: Appearance(s) in the EFL Trophy)	0	1	0
Chelsea U21	Total		0	0	0	0	0	0	1	0	1	0
Hashtag United (loan)	2023–24	Isthmian League Premier Division	11	0	2	0	—		3 (Note: One appearance in the FA Trophy, one in the Essex Senior Cup and one in the Alan Turvey Trophy)	0	16	0
Hampton & Richmond Borough (loan)	2024–25	National League South	23	0	0	0	—		0	0	23	0
Boreham Wood (loan)	2025–26	National League	24	0	2	0	—		7 (Note: Four appearances in the National League Cup, three appearances in National League play-offs)	0	33	0
Boreham Wood (loan)	2026–27	National League	0	0	0	0	—		0	0	0	0
Boreham Wood (loan)	Total		24	0	2	0	0	0	7	0	33	0
Career total			58	0	4	0	0	0	11	0	73	0

== Honours ==
Boreham Wood

- National League Cup: 2025–26

Chelsea U18s

- U18 Premier League Cup: 2021–22
