= Gabriel Caliste =

Footballer (born 2006)

Personal information
- Full name: Gabriel Paul Russie Caliste
- Date of birth: 18 November 2006 (age 19)
- Place of birth: Redbridge, England
- Height: 1.75 m (5 ft 9 in)
- Position: Midfielder

Team information
- Current team: West Ham United

Youth career
- Euro Dagenham
- –2016: Dagenham & Redbridge
- West Ham United
- Millwall
- Billericay Town
- 2021–2025: West Ham United

Senior career*
Years	Team	Apps	(Gls)
2025–	West Ham United	0	(0)

International career^{‡}
2024–	Mauritius	11	(0)
- * Club domestic league appearances and goals as of 09:00, 7 December 2024 (UTC) ‡ National team caps and goals as of 09:00, 22 April 2026 (UTC)

Gabriel Paul Russie Caliste (born 18 November 2006) is a footballer who plays as a midfielder for West Ham United. Born in England, he represents the Mauritius national team.

== Club career ==
Caliste began his career at local club Euro Dagenham, before signing for Dagenham & Redbridge. Caliste left Dagenham in 2016, after the club closed their academy following their relegation from the Football League. After spells at West Ham United and Millwall, Caliste joined Billericay Town for a number of seasons. In 2021, Caliste re-joined the academy at West Ham United permanently. On 6 January 2025, Caliste signed his first professional contract at West Ham.

== International career ==
On 3 September 2024, Caliste made his debut, at the age of 17, for Mauritius, playing 62 minutes in an Intercontinental Cup tie against India, followed by 54 minutes against Syria. He also started against Hong Kong in November 2024.

Caliste played in all three matches in the 2025 COSAFA Cup against South Africa, Mozambique, and Zimbabwe.

He played three matches in the 2026 FIFA World Cup qualification against Cape Verde, Angola, and Cameroon. His home debut was against Cape Verde in September 2025.

== Honours ==
West Ham United

- Premier League Cup: 2024–25 (Under-18)
- National League Cup: 2025–26 runner-up
