= Nathan Ashmore =

English footballer

Personal information
- Full name: Nathan James Ashmore
- Date of birth: 22 February 1990 (age 36)
- Place of birth: Portsmouth, England
- Height: 1.88 m (6 ft 2 in)
- Position: Goalkeeper

Team information
- Current team: Dagenham & Redbridge
- Number: 1

Youth career
- –2008: Portsmouth

Senior career*
Years	Team	Apps	(Gls)
2008–2011	Havant & Waterlooville	37	(0)
2011–2016	Gosport Borough	109	(1)
2016–2020	Ebbsfleet United	156	(0)
2019–2020	→ Boreham Wood (loan)	23	(0)
2020–2026	Boreham Wood	212	(0)
2022	→ Maidenhead United (loan)	8	(0)
2025	→ Bedford Town (loan)	5	(0)
2025–2026	→ Bedford Town (loan)	11	(0)
2026	→ Bedford Town (loan)	13	(0)
2026–	Dagenham & Redbridge	13	(0)

International career
2024	England C	1	(0)
- * Club domestic league appearances and goals as of 11:46, 25 October 2026 (UTC)

Nathan James Ashmore (born 22 February 1990) is an English footballer who plays as a goalkeeper for National League South side Dagenham & Redbridge.

== Career ==
Ashmore signed schoolboy terms for Portsmouth and featured in a youth team alongside Premier League players Joel Ward and Matt Ritchie. His senior career started at Havant & Waterlooville before a successful loan spell at Gosport Borough turned into a permanent move. Ashmore helped Gosport to successive promotions to National League South before being snapped up by Ebbsfleet United in March 2016 to help with their promotion push to the National League, although Ebbsfleet would have to rely on the play-offs after finishing second behind Maidenhead United in 2016/17. Ashmore would sign on loan for the Magpies nearly five years later. At Ebbsfleet, Ashmore won the Player of the Season award two years running.

In 2019, Ashmore was signed on loan by Boreham Wood, with manager Luke Garrard saying: "I think he's a top, top goalkeeper at this level." The move was later made permanent and at the start of the 2021–22 National League season, Ashmore kept four clean sheets in a row. Ashmore signed a new two-year contract with Boreham Wood in the summer of 2022. In the 2022–23 season, Ashmore kept 15 clean sheets to earn a place in the National League Team of the Year.

On 1 October 2025, Ashmore joined National League North club Bedford Town on loan for the remainder of the 2025–26 season. On 29 October, following the recall of Boreham Wood's loan goalkeeper Finlay Herrick by parent club West Ham United, Ashmore was recalled from his loan spell. He returned to Bedford Town in February 2026.

On 21 May 2026, Ashmore joined National League South club Dagenham & Redbridge on a two-year deal.

== Personal life ==
Ashmore grew up in Buckland, Portsmouth, where he suffered bullying and racist abuse at the hands of a local gang of children. He has also suffered abuse from fans on the pitch. While playing for Ebbsfleet at his future club Boreham Wood in November 2018, Ashmore jumped into the crowd to confront abusive fans. At Chesterfield he was insulted by a pitch invader. Ashmore has been an advocate for change in the sport, giving interviews on the subject to the BBC and talkSport. He still lives in Portsmouth with his wife and daughter.

== Honours ==
Boreham Wood

- National League South play-offs: 2025

Individual

- National League Team of the Year: 2022–23
- National League South Team of the Season: 2024–25
