= Morgan Roberts =

Welsh footballer

Personal information
- Full name: Morgan Alfie Roberts
- Date of birth: 20 December 2000 (age 25)
- Place of birth: Northampton, England
- Height: 1.78 m (5 ft 10 in)
- Position: Winger

Team information
- Current team: Tamworth
- Number: 30

Youth career
- 2009–2018: Northampton Town

Senior career*
Years	Team	Apps	(Gls)
2018–2021	Northampton Town	6	(0)
2019	→ AFC Rushden & Diamonds (loan)	5	(1)
2019–2020	→ Banbury United (loan)	8	(3)
2020	→ Brackley Town (loan)	1	(0)
2021–2022	Banbury United	42	(20)
2022–2023	Swindon Town	7	(0)
2023	→ Aldershot Town (loan)	4	(0)
2023–2026	Brackley Town	126	(21)
2026–	Tamworth	6	(2)
- * Club domestic league appearances and goals as of 22:00, 9 September 2026 (UTC)

Morgan Alfie Roberts (born 7 November 2000) is a Welsh professional footballer who plays as a winger for National League club Tamworth.

== Club career ==
=== Northampton Town ===
Roberts joined Northampton Town's youth academy in 2009, after beginning at Northampton Soccer Stars, prior to being promoted into the first-team squad nine years later. Roberts was an unused substitute for an EFL League One match with Blackpool in April 2018, which preceded his professional debut on 5 May during a 2–2 draw at Sixfields Stadium with Oldham Athletic; the club's 2017–18 finale as they suffered relegation. He signed a new contract with Northampton on 17 May.

==== AFC Rushden & Diamonds (loan) ====
On 11 October 2019, Roberts headed off on loan to AFC Rushden & Diamonds of the Southern League. He won man of the match in two of his first three appearances for them. He scored his first senior goal on 22 October, netting against Banbury United; a team he would later join.

==== Banbury United (loan) ====
Roberts made a second one-month loan move of the season to a Southern League Premier Central team, this time in the shape of Banbury United on 12 November 2019; joining up with brother Connor.

==== Brackley Town (loan) ====
On 12 December 2020, Roberts joined National League North team Brackley Town on loan for a month.

=== Banbury United ===
On 7 July 2021, Roberts rejoined former club Banbury United on a permanent deal. The 2021–22 season saw success for Banbury as they were promoted to the sixth tier of English football for the first time in their history.

=== Swindon Town ===
On 1 September 2022, Roberts returned to the Football League when he joined EFL League Two club Swindon Town. The move came after an impressive opening month of the season that saw Roberts saw four goals, ultimately being awarded the National League North Player of the Month award for August 2022.

==== Aldershot Town (loan) ====
In February 2023, Roberts signed for National League club Aldershot Town on loan until the end of the season but returned to Swindon Town the following month due to lack of game time.

=== Brackley Town ===
Roberts was released by Swindon Town upon the conclusion of the 2022/23 season and subsequently re-joined Brackley Town on a permanent basis in June 2023. Despite a successful individual season that saw him named in the National League North Team of the Season, it ultimately ended in disappointment as Brackley were defeated by Boston United in the play-off final. He signed a new contract to remain at the club for the following season.

=== Tamworth ===
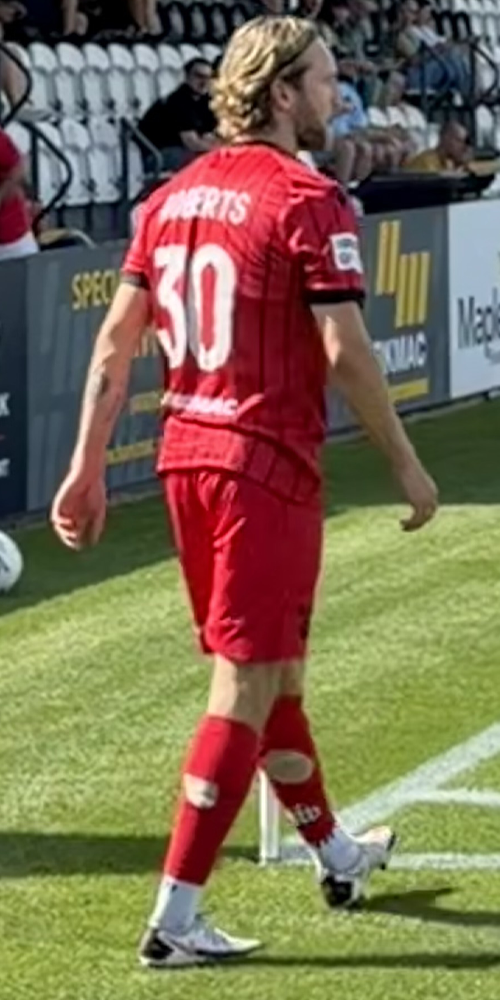
Roberts playing for Tamworth in August 2026.

In June 2026, Roberts returned to the National League following Brackley Town's relegation, joining Tamworth. On 8 August 2026, Morgan made his debut for Tamworth, on the opening day of the 2026–27 season, playing the full match in a 3–3 draw away at Boreham Wood. Roberts scored his first goal in the National League for Tamworth on 28 August 2026, netting a 90+8 minute winner in a home fixture against Worthing, with the match finishing 3–2, a result that gave Tamworth their first victory of the season.

== International career ==
Roberts was called up to a training camp with the Wales U21s in March 2019.

== Personal life ==
He attended Kingsthorpe Grove and Northampton School for Boys as a pupil. His father, Gareth, is a former semi-professional footballer, while brother Connor is a current footballer.

== Career statistics ==
As of match played 9 September 2026.

Club statistics
Club	Season	League			Cup		League Cup		Other		Total	
Club	Season	Division	Apps	Goals	Apps	Goals	Apps	Goals	Apps	Goals	Apps	Goals
Northampton Town	2017–18	League One	1	0	0	0	0	0	0	0	1	0
Northampton Town	2018–19	League Two	3	0	0	0	0	0	1 (Note: Appearance(s) in the EFL Trophy.)	0	4	0
Northampton Town	2019–20	League Two	1	0	1	0	1	0	2	0	5	0
Northampton Town	2020–21	League One	1	0	1	0	2	0	3	0	7	0
Northampton Town	Northampton Town Total		6	0	2	0	3	0	6	0	17	0
AFC Rushden & Diamonds (loan)	2019–20	Southern League	5	1	0	0	0	0	3 (Note: Appearance(s) in the FA Trophy.)	0	8	1
Banbury United (loan)	2019–20	Southern League	8	3	0	0	3	0	0	0	11	3
Brackley Town (loan)	2020–21	National League North	1	0	0	0	0	0	2	0	3	0
Banbury United	2021–22	Southern League Premier Division Central	36	16	5	1	—		5 (Note: Two appearances in FA Trophy, three appearances in Southern League Cup)	1	46	18
Banbury United	2022–23	National League North	6	4	0	0	—		0	0	6	4
Banbury United	Banbury United Total		42	20	5	1	0	0	5	1	52	22
Swindon Town	2022–23	League Two	7	0	1	0	0	0	2	0	10	0
Aldershot Town (loan)	2022–23	National League	4	0	0	0	—		0	0	4	0
Brackley Town	2023–24	National League North	39	10	0	0	—		0	0	39	10
Brackley Town	2024–25	National League North	42	6	1	0	—		1 (Note: One appearance in FA Trophy)	1 (Note: One goal in FA Trophy)	44	7
Brackley Town	2025–26	National League	45	5	4	0	—		7 (Note: Five appearances in National League Cup and two appearances in FA Trophy)	1 (Note: One goal in National League Cup)	56	6
Brackley Town	Brackley Town Total		126	21	5	0	0	0	8	2	139	23
Tamworth	2026–27	National League	6	2	0	0	—		0	0	6	2
Career total			205	47	13	1	6	0	26	3	250	51

== Honours ==
Banbury United

- Southern Football League Premier Division Central: 2021–22

Brackley Town:

- National League North: 2024–25

Individual

- National League North Player of the Month: August 2022, April 2024
- National League North Team of the Season: 2024–25
