= James Clarke (footballer, born 2000) =

Irish professional footballer

Personal information
- Full name: James Michael Neil Clarke
- Date of birth: 2 April 2000 (age 26)
- Place of birth: Birkenhead, England
- Height: 1.83 m (6 ft 0 in)
- Position: Defender

Team information
- Current team: Boreham Wood
- Number: 2

Youth career
- 2014–2018: Burnley

Senior career*
Years	Team	Apps	(Gls)
2018–2019	Burnley	0	(0)
2019–2022	Mansfield Town	18	(0)
2021–2022	→ Solihull Moors (loan)	15	(1)
2022–2026	Solihull Moors	193	(6)
2026–	Boreham Wood	6	(3)

International career
2018	Republic of Ireland U18	2	(0)
- * Club domestic league appearances and goals as of 10 April 2026

James Michael Neil Clarke (born 2 April 2000) is a professional footballer who plays as a defender for National League side Boreham Wood. Born in England, he is a youth international for the Republic of Ireland.

== Career ==
=== Burnley ===
Clarke came through the Academy at Burnley and earned a call up to the Republic of Ireland under-18 team in March 2018 where he earned two caps, both against Romania. He turned professional at Turf Moor in April 2018 and was named as Clarets' Scholar of the Year the following month. However he struggled with injuries in the 2018–19 season and he was allowed to leave the club after losing his place in the under-23 team.

=== Mansfield Town ===
On 24 June 2019, Clarke signed a two-year deal with EFL League Two side Mansfield Town, alongside fellow Burnley youth-team graduate Aidan Stone. He made his debut in the English Football League on 20 August, coming on as an 89th-minute substitute for Hayden White in a 3–2 defeat to Leyton Orient at Field Mill. Manager John Dempster went on to hand Clarke his first start for the "Stags" four days later, in a 0–0 draw at home to Stevenage.

==== Solihull Moors (loan) ====
In November 2021, he joined National League side Solihull Moors on a short-term loan. At the end of December 2021, after a successful loan spell (6 appearances and 5 clean sheets), the loan was extended to the end of the 2021–22 season.

=== Solihull Moors ===
On 14 March 2022, Clarke's loan deal at Solihull Moors was made permanent, signing a deal until the end of the 2023/24 season. On 23 June 2023, Clarke signed a new two-year deal to keep him at Solihull until the end of the 2024/25 season.

=== Boreham Wood ===
On 11 March 2026, Clarke signed for fellow National League club Boreham Wood.

== Career statistics ==
As of match played 6 June 2022

Appearances and goals by club, season and competition
Club	Season	League			FA Cup		EFL Cup		Other		Total	
Club	Season	Division	Apps	Goals	Apps	Goals	Apps	Goals	Apps	Goals	Apps	Goals
Burnley	2018–19	Premier League	0	0	0	0	0	0	0	0	0	0
Mansfield Town	2019–20	League Two	12	0	0	0	0	0	4 (Note: Appearance(s) in the Football League Trophy)	0	16	0
Mansfield Town	2020–21	League Two	2	0	1	0	0	0	1	0	4	0
Mansfield Town	2021-22	League Two	4	0	0	0	0	0	3	0	7	0
Mansfield Town	Total		18	0	1	0	0	0	8	0	27	0
Solihull Moors (loan)	2021–22	National League	15	1	0	0	—		4 (Note: Appearance(s) in the FA Trophy)	0	19	1
Solihull Moors
Solihull Moors	2021–22	National League	15	1	0	0	—		0	0	15	1
Solihull Moors	Total		30	2	0	0	—		4	0	34	2
Career total			48	2	1	0	0	0	12	0	61	2

== Honours ==
Solihull Moors

- FA Trophy runner-up: 2023–24
