= Abdul Abdulmalik =

English footballer

Personal information
- Full name: Abdulsabur Oluwatosin Olubukola Alao Oladipupo Abdulmalik
- Date of birth: 21 April 2003 (age 23)
- Place of birth: Lambeth, England
- Height: 5 ft 6 in (1.68 m)
- Position: Forward

Team information
- Current team: Djurgårdens IF
- Number: 10

Youth career
- 2018–2023: Millwall

Senior career*
Years	Team	Apps	(Gls)
2023–2024	Millwall	0	(0)
2023–2024	→ Wealdstone (loan)	9	(0)
2024–2026	Boreham Wood	78	(17)
2026–	Djurgårdens IF	3	(0)

International career
2020	England U17	3	(1)
- * Club domestic league appearances and goals as of 00:04, 13 November 2026 (UTC)

Abdulsabur Oluwatosin Olubukola Alao Oladipupo Abdulmalik (born 21 April 2003) is an English professional footballer who plays as a forward for Allsvenskan club Djurgårdens IF.

== Club career ==
=== Millwall ===
Abdulmalik came through the youth academy at Millwall, progressing through the age groups up to under-21 level. During his time in the academy he was part of squads that won back-to-back Professional Development League titles, in the 2022–23 and 2023–24 seasons. He was released by Millwall in July 2024. He also had an unsuccessful two-week trial with Portsmouth in 2021.

==== Wealdstone (loan) ====
In the 2023–24 season, while still a Millwall academy player, Abdulmalik joined Wealdstone of the National League on loan, gaining his first experience of senior men's football. He made 11 appearances across all competitions during the loan spell.

=== Boreham Wood ===
Abdulmalik joined Boreham Wood on a free transfer in July 2024, becoming the club's fourth signing of that summer under manager Ross Jenkins. Primarily deployed on the left wing, he became a regular in the Boreham Wood side, noted for his pace, close control, and ability to beat National League full-backs in one-on-one situations.

On 28 April 2025, Abdul extended his contract with Boreham Wood until the end of the 2026–27 season, with an option for an additional year.

In the 2025–26 season, Abdulmalik made 48 National League appearances, scoring 15 goals, and contributed further goals in cup competition as Boreham Wood challenged for promotion. On 18 March 2026, Abdulmalik scored once in the 2026 National League Cup final against West Ham United U21, which Boreham Wood won 7–6 on penalties after regular time finished 2–2. On 10 May, Abdulmalik scored once and provided an assist in the National League play-off final against Rochdale at Wembley, which Rochdale won 3–1 on penalties after extra time finished 2–2.

=== Djurgårdens IF ===
On 30 August 2026, Abdulmalik joined Allsvenskan side Djurgårdens IF for a fee of £1.5 million plus add-ons, signing a three-year contract. This followed unsuccessful bids by Djurgårdens at £1 million and £1.5 million, with the final sale also including a sell-on clause for Boreham Wood. His transfer fee set a new National League record, surpassing the £1 million transfer of Jamie Vardy from Fleetwood Town to Leicester City in 2012.

He made his debut for the club in a Svenska Cupen match against IFK Haninge on 10 September, which Djurgårdens won 7–1 away from home.

== International career ==
Abdulmalik has represented England at under-17 level.

== Career statistics ==
As of match played 8 November 2026

Appearances and goals by club, season and competition
Club	Season	League			National cup (Note: Includes FA Cup, Svenska Cupen)		Other		Total	
Club	Season	Division	Apps	Goals	Apps	Goals	Apps	Goals	Apps	Goals
Wealdstone (loan)	2023–24	National League	9	0	1	0	1 (Note: Appearance in FA Trophy)	0	11	0
Boreham Wood	2024–25	National League South	31	3	2	1	8 (Note: Three appearances in FA Trophy; two appearances, one goal in Herts Senior Cup; three appearances, one goal in National League South play-offs)	2	41	6
Boreham Wood	2025–26	National League	45	13	4	2	7 (Note: One appearance in FA Trophy; three appearances, one goal in National League Cup; three appearances, two goals in National League play-offs)	3	56	18
Boreham Wood	2026–27	National League	2	1	0	0	0	0	2	1
Boreham Wood	Total		78	17	6	3	15	5	99	25
Djurgårdens IF	2026	Allsvenskan	2	0	1	0	0	0	3	0
Career total			89	17	8	3	16	5	113	25

== Honours ==
Boreham Wood

- National League Cup: 2026
