= Josh Landers =

Scottish association football player

Personal information
- Date of birth: 27 February 2007 (age 19)
- Place of birth: Innerleithen, Peeblesshire, Scotland
- Position: Forward

Team information
- Current team: Ayr United (on loan from West Ham United)
- Number: 9

Youth career
- Musselburgh Windsor
- –2023: Hibernian
- 2025–: West Ham United

Senior career*
Years	Team	Apps	(Gls)
2023–2025	Hibernian	2	(0)
2025–	West Ham United	0	(0)
2026	→ Boreham Wood (loan)	9	(1)
2026–	→ Ayr United (loan)	8	(1)

International career
2023–	Scotland U16	1	(0)
- * Club domestic league appearances and goals as of 23:07, 7 November 2026 (UTC)

Josh Landers (born 27 February 2007) is a Scottish professional footballer who plays for as a forward for Ayr United, on loan from West Ham United. He is a Scotland youth international.

== Early life ==
Raised in Innerleithen, Landers is the son of Ronnie and Yvonne and has a younger sister named Amy. He attended the nearby Peebles High School.

== Club career ==
=== Hibernian ===
Landers came through the Hibernian academy, having joined at ten years-old after playing for Musselburgh Windsor. He scored his first goal for the Hibs under-18 side at 14 years-old. He signed his first professional contract with Hibs in August 2023.

He made his first team debut for the club in November 2023 against Aberdeen in the Scottish League Cup. In the next fixture, he made his Scottish Premiership debut against St. Mirren. Shortly afterwards, he signed a new three-year contract with Hibs.

=== West Ham United ===
On 30 January 2025, Landers signed for Premier League club West Ham United, initially joining the club's Under-21 squad following a successful trial period.

On 26 March 2026, Landers joined National League side Boreham Wood on loan until the end of the 2025–26 season.

On 3 September 2026, Landers joined Scottish Championship side Ayr United on loan for the remainder of the 2026–27 season.

== International career ==
In February 2023, he made his debut for the Scotland national under-16 football team against England U16.
