= Cameron Coxe =

Welsh footballer

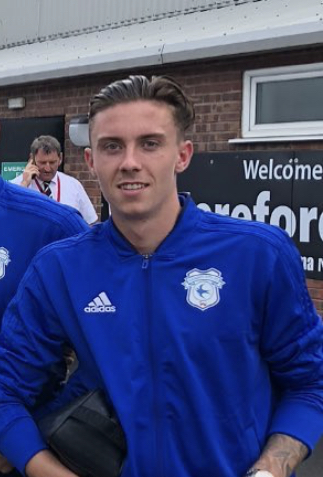

Personal information
- Full name: Cameron Terry Coxe
- Date of birth: 18 December 1998 (age 27)
- Place of birth: Swansea, Wales
- Height: 6 ft 1 in (1.85 m)
- Position: Defender

Team information
- Current team: Morecambe
- Number: 2

Youth career
- 2005–2017: Cardiff City

Senior career*
Years	Team	Apps	(Gls)
2017–2020	Cardiff City	0	(0)
2020–2022	Solihull Moors	23	(0)
2021–2022	→ Colchester United (loan)	15	(0)
2022	Colchester United	23	(0)
2022	→ Boreham Wood (loan)	9	(0)
2022–2026	Boreham Wood	108	(4)
2024–2025	→ Salisbury (loan)	7	(0)
2026–	Morecambe	0	(0)

International career^{‡}
2014–2015	Wales U17	6	(0)
2015–2016	Wales U19	6	(0)
2017	Wales U20	2	(0)
2017–2022	Wales U21	16	(0)
- * Club domestic league appearances and goals as of 19:19, 9 June 2026 (UTC) ‡ National team caps and goals as of 16:49 15 May 2022 (UTC)

Cameron Terry Coxe (born 18 December 1998) is a Welsh professional footballer who plays as a defender for National League North club Morecambe.

== Early life ==
Coxe was born in Merthyr Tydfil and attended Afon Taf High School.

== Club career ==
=== Cardiff City ===
Coxe began his career at Cardiff City, joining the club's youth academy at the age of seven before signing his first professional contract in February 2017. He made his professional debut during a 2–1 defeat against Burton Albion in the second round of the EFL Cup on 22 August 2017. However, Coxe did not feature for the first team for another two years. He appeared in two FA Cup fixtures under new manager Neil Harris in January 2020, but was later released at the end of the 2019–20 season.

=== Solihull Moors ===
In August 2020, Coxe signed for National League side Solihull Moors.

==== Colchester United (loan) ====
On 2 July 2021, Coxe joined League Two side Colchester United on loan until January 2022. He made his debut in Colchester's 0–0 draw away at Carlisle United on 7 August 2021.

=== Colchester United ===
On 7 January 2022, Coxe signed a permanent deal with Colchester United.

=== Boreham Wood ===
On 13 October 2022, Coxe returned to the National League when he joined Boreham Wood on a short-term loan deal.

On 30 December 2022, Boreham Wood confirmed the permanent signing of Coxe for an undisclosed fee on a two-and-a-half-year deal.

In November 2024, Coxe joined fellow National League South side Salisbury on a three-month loan deal.

=== Morecambe ===
On 5 June 2026, Coxe joined National League North club Morecambe on a two-year deal.

== International career ==
Coxe has represented Wales at under-19 level. In May 2017, Coxe was named in the Wales under-20 squad for the 2017 Toulon Tournament. After making his debut for the side in the tournament opener against Ivory Coast, Coxe was named in the starting line-up in Wales' second group match against France but was left out of the final game against Bahrain as Wales were eliminated in the group stage.

Coxe made his debut for the under-21 side on 1 September 2017 in a 3–0 victory over Switzerland. He was named in a preliminary senior Wales squad in May 2018 for a friendly against Mexico but was left out of the final selection.

== Career statistics ==
As of match played 26 December 2022

Club	Season	League			FA Cup		League Cup		Other		Total	
Club	Season	Division	Apps	Goals	Apps	Goals	Apps	Goals	Apps	Goals	Apps	Goals
Cardiff City	2017–18	Championship	0	0	0	0	1	0	0	0	1	0
Cardiff City	2018–19	Premier League	0	0	0	0	0	0	0	0	0	0
Cardiff City	2019–20	Championship	0	0	2	0	1	0	0	0	3	0
Cardiff City	Total		0	0	2	0	2	0	0	0	4	0
Solihull Moors	2020–21	National League	23	0	2	0	0	0	1 (Note: Appearance in FA Trophy)	0	26	0
Colchester United (loan)	2021–22	League Two	15	0	2	0	1	0	4 (Note: Appearances in EFL Trophy)	0	22	0
Colchester United	2021–22	League Two	16	0	0	0	0	0	0	0	16	0
Colchester United	2022–23	League Two	7	0	0	0	1	0	2	0	10	0
Colchester United	Total		23	0	0	0	1	0	2	0	26	0
Boreham Wood (loan)	2022–23	National League	9	0	3	1	–		1	0	13	1
Career total			70	0	9	1	4	0	8	0	91	1
