= Érico Sousa =

Portuguese footballer

Personal information
- Full name: Érico Henrique Esteves de Sousa
- Date of birth: 12 March 1995 (age 31)
- Place of birth: Vale da Amoreira, Moita, Portugal
- Height: 1.70 m (5 ft 7 in)
- Position: Midfielder

Team information
- Current team: Boreham Wood
- Number: 7

Youth career
- –2011: Manchester City
- 2011–2014: Barnsley

Senior career*
Years	Team	Apps	(Gls)
2014–2015	Hyde United	14	(1)
2015–2016	Celje	30	(2)
2017	Tadcaster Albion	3	(1)
2017	Accrington Stanley	0	(0)
2017	Tranmere Rovers	4	(0)
2017–2020	Accrington Stanley	10	(0)
2018	→ Barrow (loan)	4	(1)
2020	Tadcaster Albion	1	(1)
2020–2021	Darlington	9	(4)
2021–2022	Grimsby Town	33	(2)
2022–	Boreham Wood	89	(17)

International career
2014	Portugal U19	1	(0)
- * Club domestic league appearances and goals as of 11:51, 16 April 2025 (UTC)

Érico Henrique Esteves de Sousa (born 12 March 1995) is a Portuguese footballer who plays as a midfielder for National League club Boreham Wood.

He came through the youth ranks at Manchester City and Barnsley and played in the Football League for Accrington Stanley and in the Slovenian PrvaLiga for Celje. He also played non-league football for Hyde United, Tadcaster Albion, Tranmere Rovers, Barrow, Darlington and Grimsby Town.

He is a former Portugal U19 international, having received one cap in 2014.

== Career ==
=== Early life and career ===
Born in Vale da Amoreira, Moita, Portugal, Sousa moved to England when he was 10. He started his career at Manchester City, joining them when he was 15. After leaving Manchester City, Sousa joined Barnsley at the academy. After progressing through the ranks of the club's academy, Sousa was released by Barnsley on 7 May 2014.

After leaving Barnsley, Sousa joined Hyde United. During his time at Hyde United, Sousa made 14 appearances and scoring once for the side.

=== NK Celje ===
After leaving Hyde United, Sousa moved to Slovenia, joining Celje on 4 August 2015, signing a three-year contract.

On 7 August 2015, Sousa made his professional debut with Celje in a Slovenian PrvaLiga match against Gorica, scoring in a 3-2 loss. He then played a vital role when he set up four goals in three matches between 2 December 2015 and 12 December 2015, including twice against ND Gorica, in which they drew 2-2. He then scored his second goal for the club on 19 March 2016, in a 2-1 loss against NK Domžale. He established himself in the first team at Celje and went on to make a total of 29 appearances and scoring once in his first season.

However, in the 2016-17 season, Sousa made no appearances for the club and left the club in August 2016. After leaving NK Celje, Sousa enjoyed his time at the club, quoting: "It's a bit different. Language was a bit of a struggle but I started getting used to it and learned a few words myself."

=== Tadcaster Albion ===
After leaving NK Celje, Sousa returned to England, where he joined Reading on trial, featuring in the club's U23 Development League fixture against Derby County on 26 September.

Sousa remained a free agent until he joined Tadcaster Albion on 6 January 2017. He made three appearances and scoring once against Goole on 30 January 2017.

=== Accrington Stanley ===
On 13 February 2017 he signed a deal to join Accrington Stanley until the end of the season. This marked Sousas’ return to the English Football League after playing in the Slovenian top flight with NK Celje in 2016.

However, Sousa made no appearances for the side and was released from Accrington Stanley on 21 March 2017 following complications regarding registering him as a player.

=== Tranmere Rovers ===
He signed a new contract with National League side Tranmere Rovers, after manager Micky Mellon was impressed with his ability in the training sessions he had with the club.

After missing out four matches, Sousa did not make his Tranmere Rovers debut, coming on as a late second-half substitute, in a 9-0 win over Solihull Moors on 8 April 2017. After making four appearances at the end of the 2016-17 season, Sousa was released by the club.

=== Return to Accrington Stanley ===
After leaving Tranmere Rovers at the end of the 2016–17 season, Sousa re-joined Accrington Stanley for the second time on 27 June 2017, signing a one-year contract.

Sousa made his second debut for the club in a 3-2 win over Middlesbrough's U21 on 19 September 2017 in the EFL Trophy. He scored his first goal in a 2-1 loss against Blackpool in the EFL Trophy. On 7 November, he scored twice in a 4-0 win away to Wigan Athletic U23s, also in the EFL Trophy. Sousa continued to struggle in the first team, as well as his own injury concern.

Accrington exercised a contractual option at the end of the 2017–18 season to retain him.

On 8 October Sousa joined Barrow on a short-term loan.

On 24 June 2020 it was announced that Sousa would be leaving Accrington Stanley when his contract expired.

=== Darlington ===
Sousa made a brief return to Tadcaster Albion, before joining National League North club Darlington on 28 October 2020. He scored four goals from nine National League North appearances before the season was ended early because of the COVID-19 pandemic, and also contributed three goals in five FA Trophy matches, finishing overall top scorer with 7 goals from 14 games.

=== Grimsby Town ===
On 22 June 2021, Sousa joined National League side Grimsby Town, on a one-year contract.

Sousa played in the 2022 National League play-off final as Grimsby beat Solihull Moors 2–1 at the London Stadium to return to the Football League.

On 11 June 2022, the club announced their retained list ahead of the 2022–23 season and confirmed that Sousa would be among those released when his contract expires on 30 June.

=== Boreham Wood ===
On 26 July 2022, Sousa signed for Boreham Wood.

Following Wood's relegation, Sousa departed the club on a free transfer at the end of the 2023–24 season. Despite initially being released Boreham Wood announced on 28/06/2024 that Sousa had re-signed for the club ahead of the 2024-25 season On 21 May 2026 the club announced it was releasing the player.

== International career ==
In March 2014, Sousa represented Portugal U19, making his debut in 1-0 win over Qatar U19.

== Honours ==
Grimsby Town

- National League play-off winners: 2022
