= Matt Rush =

English footballer

Personal information
- Full name: Matthew Thomas Rush
- Date of birth: 11 March 2001 (age 25)
- Place of birth: Brentwood, England
- Height: 1.77 m (5 ft 10 in)
- Position: Forward

Team information
- Current team: Boreham Wood
- Number: 32

Youth career
- Wickford Town
- 2013–2014: Billericay Town
- 2014–2019: Southend United

Senior career*
Years	Team	Apps	(Gls)
2019–2022	Southend United	23	(1)
2019	→ Great Wakering Rovers (loan)	8	(2)
2019	→ Harlow Town (loan)	8	(5)
2021	→ Tonbridge Angels (loan)	2	(1)
2022	→ Chelmsford City (loan)	16	(3)
2022–2023	Braintree Town	38	(2)
2023	Aveley	13	(2)
2023–2024	Maidstone United	31	(14)
2024	Sutton United	7	(0)
2024	→ Maidstone United (loan)	6	(3)
2024–	Boreham Wood	73	(48)
- * Club domestic league appearances and goals as of 12:24, 29 August 2026 (UTC)

Matthew Thomas Rush (born 11 March 2001) is an English professional footballer who plays as a forward for National League club Boreham Wood.

== Career ==
Rush began his career at local club Wickford Town, before moving to Billericay Town in the summer of 2013. In December 2014, Southend United signed Rush to the youth system at the club. During the second half of the 2018–19 season, Rush signed for Great Wakering Rovers on loan. In August 2019, Rush signed for Isthmian League Premier Division club Harlow Town on loan, scoring eleven goals in 13 games in all competitions during three months at the club.

On 2 November 2019, Rush made his debut for Southend in a 1–0 loss against Sunderland.

On 6 January 2021, Rush joined National League South side Tonbridge Angels on a four-week loan deal.

On 11 February 2022, following nine National League appearances for Southend, Rush joined fellow Essex club Chelmsford City on loan. At the end of the 2021–22 season, Rush was released by Southend.

On 25 June 2022, Rush agreed to join fellow Essex-based side, Braintree Town ahead of the 2022–23 campaign following his release from Southend.

On 1 July 2023, Rush signed for newly promoted National League South club, Aveley.

On 3 November 2023, Rush joined Maidstone United, signing a deal until the end of the campaign.

On 21 June 2024, Rush signed for recently relegated National League side Sutton United. In November 2024, he returned to Maidstone United on loan.

On 31 December 2024, Rush was recalled from his loan spell with Maidstone United, joining Boreham Wood for an undisclosed fee.

== Personal life ==
Rush attended The Bromfords School in Wickford alongside former Southend teammate Charlie Kelman.

== Career statistics ==
As of match played 27 August 2026

Appearances and goals by club, season and competition
Club	Season	League			FA Cup		League Cup		Other		Total	
Club	Season	Division	Apps	Goals	Apps	Goals	Apps	Goals	Apps	Goals	Apps	Goals
Southend United	2018–19	League One	0	0	0	0	0	0	0	0	0	0
Southend United	2019–20	League One	7	0	—		0	0	1 (Note: Appearances in the EFL Trophy)	0	8	0
Southend United	2020–21	League Two	7	1	1	0	0	0	3	0	11	1
Southend United	2021–22	National League	9	0	2	0	—		1 (Note: Appearance in the FA Trophy)	0	12	0
Southend United	Total		23	1	3	0	0	0	5	0	31	1
Great Wakering Rovers (loan)	2018–19	Isthmian League North Division	8	2	—		—		—		8	2
Harlow Town (loan)	2019–20	Isthmian League South Central Division	8	5	2	0	—		3	6	13	13
Tonbridge Angels (loan)	2020–21	National League South	2	1	—		—		—		2	1
Chelmsford City (loan)	2021–22	National League South	16	3	—		—		—		16	3
Braintree Town	2022–23	National League South	38	2	3	1	—		3	3	44	6
Aveley	2023–24	National League South	13	2	6	4	—		0	0	19	6
Maidstone United	2023–24	National League South	31	14	—		—		4 (Note: Two appearances in FA Trophy, two appearances and one goal in National League South play-offs)	1	35	15
Sutton United	2024–25	National League	7	0	2	1	—		0	0	9	1
Maidstone United (loan)	2024–25	National League South	6	3	0	0	—		0	0	6	3
Boreham Wood	2024–25	National League South	23	15	—		—		4 (Note: One appearance and one goal in FA Trophy, three appearances and one goal in National League South play-offs)	2	27	17
Boreham Wood	2025–26	National League	46	25	4	3	—		11 (Note: One appearance in FA Trophy, seven appearances and four goals in National League Cup, three appearances and one goal in National League South play-offs)	5	61	33
Boreham Wood	2026–27	National League	4	8	0	0	—		0	0	4	8
Boreham Wood	Total		73	48	4	3	—		15	7	92	58
Career total			225	81	20	9	0	0	30	17	275	107

== Honours ==
Boreham Wood

- National League South play-offs: 2025
