= Lewis Richardson (footballer) =

English footballer (born 2003)

Personal information
- Full name: Lewis Mark Paul Richardson
- Date of birth: 7 February 2003 (age 23)
- Place of birth: Moston, England
- Height: 5 ft 10 in (1.78 m)
- Position: Forward

Team information
- Current team: Boreham Wood
- Number: 7

Youth career
- 2011–2021: Burnley

Senior career*
Years	Team	Apps	(Gls)
2021–2025	Burnley	2	(0)
2022–2023	→ Grimsby Town (loan)	10	(2)
2025	→ York City (loan)	14	(4)
2025–	Boreham Wood	48	(14)

International career
2019	England U16	3	(2)
2019	England U17	1	(0)
- * Club domestic league appearances and goals as of 16:17, 2 September 2025 (UTC)

Lewis Mark Paul Richardson (born 7 February 2003) is an English professional footballer who plays as a forward for National League club Boreham Wood.

== Club career ==
=== Burnley ===
Richardson was born in Moston, Manchester and had his first trial at Burnley at the age of eight. In November 2018, he raised eyebrows when he scored 5 goals against Crewe Alexandra on his debut for Burnley under-18's at the age of 15. A few months later in February 2019, once he had turned 16, he made his debut for the under-23 side managed by Steve Stone. He scored a hat-trick against Rochdale in the Lancashire Senior Cup semi-final, having come on as a substitute at half-time. He subsequently became a regular member of the under-23 squad for the remainder of the 2018–19 season, regularly playing against players many years older than him. Burnley made sure to tie Richardson down to a two-year scholarship in July 2019, amid interest from fellow Premier League side Tottenham Hotspur.

In August 2019, still aged 16, he made the squad for the first team for an EFL Cup tie against League One Sunderland at Turf Moor. However, he remained an unused substitute as the Clarets were knocked out after they lost 3–1. On his 17th birthday in February 2020, Richardson signed his first professional contract with the club until the summer of 2022. Back and hamstring injuries slightly hampered his progress in the second half of the season but he still scored a total of 7 goals for the under-18 and under-23 squads. He was placed into the first-team bubble by manager Sean Dyche before the 2020–21 season commenced and played in some pre-season friendlies. He made his professional debut for the first-team in a 4–0 Premier League loss to Tottenham Hotspur on 28 February 2021, replacing Jay Rodriguez as a late substitute. At 18 years and 21 days, he became Burnley's youngest Premier League debutant.

==== Grimsby Town (loan) ====
On 1 September 2022, Richardson joined Grimsby Town on loan for the 2022–23 season.

Richardson was recalled by Burnley on 26 January 2023, he had scored two goals in fifteen appearances in all competitions. Manager Paul Hurst stated upon his departure "We thank Lewis for his contribution to our season. Obviously the last one that he had set us up for this FA Cup game at Luton and I think that he showed, at times, what a good player he is. I think he could have a big future in the game so we thank Burnley for allowing him to come to us for the first half of the season and I'll certainly be watching his career with interest."

==== York City (loan) ====
On 31 January 2025, Richardson joined National League club York City on loan for the remainder of the season.

He departed Burnley upon the expiry of his contract at the end of the 2024–25 season.

=== Boreham Wood ===
On 1 September 2025, Richardson joined National League club Boreham Wood on a two-year deal.

== International career ==
Richardson received his first call-up to England for the under-16 side in December 2018 for a mini-tournament being played in Turkey in January 2019. He scored on his debut having come on as a substitute in a group game against Moldova. He made a further two appearances in the tournament and scored another goal against Russia. He received his first call-up to the under-17 squad in September 2019, but had to withdraw due to injury. He was later called up to the October internationals but again had to withdraw with a minor injury, but he finally made his debut in November 2019 when he started in a 3–1 defeat to Denmark.

== Career statistics ==
As of match played 20 May 2025

Appearances and goals by club, season and competition
Club	Season	League			FA Cup		League Cup		Other		Total	
Club	Season	Division	Apps	Goals	Apps	Goals	Apps	Goals	Apps	Goals	Apps	Goals
Burnley	2019–20	Premier League	0	0	0	0	0	0	—		0	0
Burnley	2020–21	Premier League	2	0	0	0	0	0	—		2	0
Burnley	2021–22	Premier League	0	0	0	0	0	0	—		0	0
Burnley	2022–23	Championship	0	0	—		0	0	—		0	0
Burnley	Total		2	0	0	0	0	0	—		2	0
Grimsby Town (loan)	2022–23	League Two	10	1	2	1	—		3 (Note: Appearance(s) in EFL Trophy)	0	15	2
York City (loan)	2024–25	National League	14	4	—		—		1 (Note: Appearance in National League play-offs)	0	15	4
Career total			26	5	2	1	0	0	4	0	32	6
