= Regan Booty =

English footballer (born 1998)

Personal information
- Full name: Regan Jak Booty
- Date of birth: 4 March 1998 (age 28)
- Place of birth: Leicester, England
- Height: 1.80 m (5 ft 11 in)
- Positions: Midfielder; centre-back

Team information
- Current team: Boreham Wood
- Number: 23

Senior career*
Years	Team	Apps	(Gls)
2015–2019	Huddersfield Town	0	(0)
2018–2019	→ Aldershot Town (loan)	33	(0)
2019–2020	Notts County	13	(2)
2021–2023	Maidstone United	51	(9)
2023–2025	Gateshead	80	(5)
2025–2026	Barrow	10	(0)
2025–2026	→ Boreham Wood (loan)	5	(2)
2026–	Boreham Wood	0	(0)

International career
2023	England C	1	(0)
- * Club domestic league appearances and goals as of 13:30, 9 December 2025 (UTC)

Regan Jak Booty (born 4 March 1998) is an English professional footballer who plays as a central midfielder, defensive midfielder or centre-back for National League club Boreham Wood.

== Club career ==
Booty joined Huddersfield Town as a boy, and became captain of the club's under-23 side. On 3 July 2018, he joined Aldershot Town on a season-long loan. At the end of the loan spell, Booty left Huddersfield, without making a senior appearance, following their relegation from the Premier League.

=== Notts County ===
On 12 August 2019, Booty joined Notts County, making 13 league starts and scoring 2 goals in the 2019–20 season.

=== Maidstone United ===
Booty joined Maidstone United in June 2021.

=== Gateshead ===
On 3 July 2023, Booty signed for Gateshead following Maidstone's relegation from the National League

=== Barrow ===
On 17 July 2025, Booty joined League Two side Barrow on a three-year deal for an undisclosed fee.

=== Boreham Wood ===
On 17 November 2025, Booty returned to the National League, joining Boreham Wood on loan until 21 January 2026. The loan move was made permanent on 14 January 2026, with Booty signing a contract until the summer of 2028.

== International career ==
In March 2023, Booty received his first call-up for the England C team for their game against Wales C.

== Personal life ==
Booty is the son of former professional footballer Martyn Booty.

== Career statistics ==
As of match played 28 October 2025

Appearances and goals by club, season and competition
Club	Season	League			FA Cup		EFL Cup		Other		Total	
Club	Season	Division	Apps	Goals	Apps	Goals	Apps	Goals	Apps	Goals	Apps	Goals
Huddersfield Town	2015–16	Championship	0	0	0	0	0	0	—		0	0
Huddersfield Town	2016–17	Championship	0	0	0	0	0	0	0	0	0	0
Huddersfield Town	2017–18	Premier League	0	0	0	0	0	0	—		0	0
Huddersfield Town	Total		0	0	0	0	0	0	0	0	0	0
Aldershot Town (loan)	2018–19	National League	38	0	3	0	—		1 (Note: Appearance(s) in FA Trophy)	0	42	0
Notts County	2019–20	National League	20	2	3	0	—		1	0	24	2
Bradford (Park Avenue)	2020–21	National League North	5	1	0	0	—		1	0	6	1
Maidstone United	2021–22	National League North	32	2	0	0	—		2	0	34	2
Maidstone United	2022–23	National League	42	7	1	0	—		3	2	46	9
Maidstone United	Total		74	9	1	0	—		5	2	80	11
Gateshead	2023–24	National League	37	3	2	0	—		5	1	44	4
Gateshead	2024–25	National League	43	2	2	0	—		2	1	47	3
Gateshead	Total		80	5	4	0	—		7	2	91	7
Barrow	2025–26	League Two	10	0	0	0	1	0	3 (Note: Appearance(s) in EFL Trophy)	0	14	0
Career total			227	17	11	0	1	0	18	2	257	19

== Honours ==
Maidstone United

- National League South: 2021–22

Gateshead

- FA Trophy: 2023–24
