= Zak Brunt =

English footballer (born 2001)

Personal information
- Full name: Zak Rian Brunt
- Date of birth: 17 November 2001 (age 25)
- Place of birth: Chesterfield, England
- Height: 5 ft 9 in (1.76 m)
- Position: Midfielder

Team information
- Current team: Boreham Wood
- Number: 8

Youth career
- Sheffield United
- Aston Villa
- Manchester City
- Manchester United
- 2016–2017: Derby County

Senior career*
Years	Team	Apps	(Gls)
2017–2018	Matlock Town	9	(0)
2018–2023	Sheffield United	0	(0)
2021–2022	→ Southend United (loan)	8	(0)
2022	→ Notts County (loan)	13	(0)
2022–2023	→ Boreham Wood (loan)	43	(2)
2023–2025	Barnet	91	(12)
2025	→ Boreham Wood (loan)	14	(3)
2025–	Boreham Wood	27	(12)
- * Club domestic league appearances and goals as of 15:22, 19 April 2026 (UTC)

Zak Rian Brunt (born 17 November 2001) is an English professional footballer who plays as a midfielder for National League south club Dagenham and Redbridge

== Career ==
Having started his career at Sheffield United, Brunt joined a number of academies in his early teens, including Aston Villa and Manchester City. Brunt also travelled to Spain and had trials with Villarreal and Atlético Madrid. The latter offered him a youth contract, and he was offered a trial at Real Madrid by Guti, but he was unable to stay in Spain due to FIFA regulations on international transfers of young players. He then joined Derby County. Due to a large release clause, he dropped down to non-league football in 2017 to sign with Matlock Town, where he made his debut in a league match as an 87th-minute substitute against Witton Albion, aged just sixteen years and one day.

In 2018, Brunt returned to Sheffield United. On 10 August 2021, Brunt made his first-team debut for Sheffield United in an EFL Cup first-round victory over Carlisle United before going on to appear in the second round also.

On 28 October 2021, Brunt joined National League side Southend United on loan until January 2022. In January 2022, Brunt joined Notts County on loan until the end of the season following the expiration of his loan at Southend United. On 25 July 2022, Brunt returned to the National League when he joined Boreham Wood on a season-long loan deal.

In July 2023, Brunt signed for Barnet for an undisclosed fee. He played in all but two of the Bees' league games as they won the 2024-25 National League title.

On 28 August 2025, Brunt re-joined Boreham Wood on a season-long loan deal. The move was made permanent on 13 November 2025 for a club record fee for Wood.

== Career statistics ==
As of 8 November 2025

Appearances and goals by club, season and competition
Club	Season	League			FA Cup		EFL Cup		Other		Total	
Club	Season	Division	Apps	Goals	Apps	Goals	Apps	Goals	Apps	Goals	Apps	Goals
Matlock Town	2017–18	NPL Premier Division	9	0	0	0	—		2 (Note: Appearance(s) in Northern Premier League Challenge Cup)	0	11	0
Sheffield United	2021–22	Championship	0	0	0	0	2	0	0	0	2	0
Sheffield United	2022–23	Championship	0	0	0	0	0	0	—		0	0
Sheffield United	Total		9	0	0	0	2	0	2	0	13	0
Southend United (loan)	2021–22	National League	8	0	1	0	—		1 (Note: Appearance(s) in FA Trophy)	0	10	0
Notts County (loan)	2021–22	National League	13	0	0	0	—		1 (Note: Appearance(s) in National League play-offs)	0	14	0
Boreham Wood (loan)	2022–23	National League	43	2	5	2	—		3 (Note: One appearance in FA Trophy, two appearances in National League play-offs)	0	51	4
Barnet	2023–24	National League	44	6	5	0	—		5 (Note: Four appearances and one goal in FA Trophy, one appearance in National League play-offs)	1	54	7
Barnet	2024–25	National League	44	6	2	2	—		2	1	48	9
Barnet	2025–26	League Two	3	0	0	0	1	0	0	0	4	0
Barnet	Total		91	14	13	4	1	0	12	2	181	20
Boreham Wood	2025–26	National League	41	15	4	1	—		7 (Note: Appearances in National League Cup)	1	52	17
Career total			205	29	17	5	3	0	21	3	246	37

== Honours ==
Barnet

- National League: 2024–25

Individual

- National League Team of the Season: 2025–26
