= Boreham Wood F.C. =

English football club

Coordinates: 51°39′43″N 0°16′20″W

- Full name: Boreham Wood Football Club
- Nickname: The Wood
- Founded: 1948
- Ground: Meadow Park
- Capacity: 4,500 (1,700 seated)
- Chairman: Danny Hunter
- Manager: Luke Garrard
- League: National League
- 2025–26: National League, 4th of 24
- Website: borehamwoodfootballclub.co.uk
Home colours	Away colours	Third colours

Boreham Wood Football Club is a professional football club based in Borehamwood, Hertfordshire, England. They are currently members of the National League, the fifth tier of English football, and play at Meadow Park. Established in 1948, they are known as "the Wood".

== History ==
The club was established in 1948 as a merger of Boreham Wood Rovers and Royal Retournez, and began playing in the Mid-Herts League. In 1951 they joined the Parthenon League, and finished as runners-up in 1953–54 and 1954–55 before winning the title in 1955–56. After finishing as runners-up again in 1956–57, they joined the Spartan League. They finished as runners-up in 1963–64 and again in 1965–66, after which they switched to Division Two of the Athenian League.

The 1968–69 season saw Boreham Wood win Division Two, earning promotion to Division One. The following season they finished as runners-up in Division One and were promoted to the Premier Division. After the division was disbanded in 1973, the club were placed in Division One for the 1973–74 season, in which they were league champions and reached the first round of the FA Cup for the first time, eventually losing 3–0 at Southend United. At the end of the season the club joined Division Two of the Isthmian League. They won the division in 1976–77 and were promoted to the renamed Premier Division. The following season saw them reach the first round of the FA Cup again, losing 2–0 in a replay to Swindon Town after a 0–0 draw at home.

The club remained in the Premier Division until being relegated to Division One at the end of the 1981–82 season, in which they finished bottom of the table. In 1994–95 they were Division One champions, and were promoted back to the Premier Division. The 1996–97 season saw them reach the second round of the FA Cup for the first time after they beat Rushden & Diamonds 3–2 in a first round replay. In the second round they lost 2–1 at Luton Town. In the same season they also won the Isthmian League Cup. They repeated their FA Cup feat the following season, beating Hayes in the first round before losing 2–0 to Cheltenham Town in a replay. In 1998–99 they reached the first round again, losing 3–2 at home to Luton.

After being relegated in 1999–2000 they won Division One at the first attempt to make an immediate return to the Premier Division. However, they were relegated again at the end of the 2002–03 season, although the season did see them reach the FA Cup first round again, where they lost 5–0 at Torquay United. After one season in Division One North (and another FA Cup first round appearance, a 4–0 defeat at Blackpool), they were transferred to Division One East of the Southern League.

After winning Division One East in 2005–06, a season in which they also reached the semi-finals of the FA Trophy, losing 3–0 on aggregate to Woking, the club were promoted to the Premier Division of the Isthmian League. A fourth-place finish in 2009–10 saw them qualify for the promotion play-offs, and after beating Aveley 1–0 in the semi-finals, a 2–0 win over Kingstonian in the final resulted in promotion to the Conference South. The 2012–13 and 2013–14 seasons saw the club reach the FA Cup first round again, losing at home to Brentford and away at Carlisle United in a replay. In 2014–15 Boreham Wood finished as runners-up in the Conference South. In the subsequent play-offs, they beat Havant & Waterlooville 4–2 on aggregate before defeating Whitehawk 2–1 in the final to earn promotion to the renamed National League. Their first season in the National League saw a tenth FA Cup first round appearance, ending with a 2–1 defeat at home to Northwich Victoria.

In the 2017–18 FA Cup Boreham Wood beat Football League opposition for the first time, defeating Blackpool 2–1 at home in the first round. In the second round they lost 3–0 at Coventry City. The club went on to finish fourth in the National League at the end of the season, qualifying for the play-offs. After defeating AFC Fylde 2–1 and Sutton United 3–2, they lost 2–1 to Tranmere Rovers in the Wembley final. In 2019–20 the club finished fifth and again qualified for the play-offs. After defeating FC Halifax Town 2–1 in the quarter-finals, they lost 1–0 to Harrogate Town in the semi-finals. The club reached the first round of the 2020–21 FA Cup, in which they defeated League Two club Southend United 4–3 on penalties after a 3–3 draw. They went on to beat Canvey Island 3–0 in the second round, earning a third round tie with Millwall, which they lost 2–0. In the 2021–22 FA Cup, the club reached the fifth round for the first time after beating League One club AFC Wimbledon in the third round and Championship club AFC Bournemouth in the fourth. They lost 2–0 to Premier League club Everton in the fifth round.

In the 2022–23 season Boreham Wood finished sixth in the National League; in the subsequent promotion play-offs, they defeated Barnet 2–1 in the quarter-finals, before losing 3–2 after extra time to Notts County in the semi-finals. The following season they finished fourth-from-bottom of the National League and were relegated to the National League South. However, in 2024–25 they secured an immediate return to the National League, finishing fifth in the league before going on to defeat Maidstone United 1–0 in the play-off final. The following season saw them win the National League Cup, beating West Ham United U21 on penalties in the final. They also finished fourth in the National League, going on to beat Forest Green Rovers 1–0 in the play-off quarter-finals, before winning 2–1 at Carlisle United in the semi-finals. The club subsequently lost the final against Rochdale on penalties.

== Ground ==
The club initially played at Eldon Avenue until moving to Meadow Park in 1963.

== Current squad ==
As of 23 October 2026

Note: Flags indicate national team as defined under FIFA eligibility rules; some limited exceptions apply. Players may hold more than one non-FIFA nationality.

No.	Pos.	Nation	Player
2	DF	IRL	James Clarke
3	DF	ENG	Oliver Bainbridge
4	MF	ENG	Tom White
5	DF	ENG	Chris Bush
6	DF	ENG	Charlie O'Connell
7	FW	ENG	Lewis Richardson
8	MF	ENG	Zak Brunt
9	FW	ENG	Danny Cashman (on loan from Crawley Town)
11	MF	TAN	Tarryn Allarakhia
14	FW	ENG	Conor Wilkinson (on loan from Solihull Moors)
16	DF	ENG	Callum Reynolds (captain)

No.	Pos.	Nation	Player
17	DF	ENG	Tylor Golden
20	FW	BAN	Farhaan Ali Wahid (on loan from Fulham)
21	MF	ENG	Marley Marshall-Miranda
22	GK	ENG	Ted Curd (on loan from Chelsea)
23	MF	ENG	Regan Booty
25	DF	ENG	Ollie Kensdale
26	DF	ENG	Hayden Stapelberg
27	FW	ENG	Jay Bird (on loan from Salford City)
30	DF	ENG	Will Wright
32	FW	ENG	Matt Rush
34	MF	ENG	Ben Whitfield (on loan from Barrow)

=== On loan ===
Note: Flags indicate national team as defined under FIFA eligibility rules; some limited exceptions apply. Players may hold more than one non-FIFA nationality.

No.	Pos.	Nation	Player
18	FW	ENG	Luke Norris (at Wealdstone until the end of the 2026-27 season)

== Management staff ==
Position	Staff
Manager	Luke Garrard
Assistant Manager	Junior Lewis
Goalkeeping Coach	Alan Julian
Physical Performance Coach	Joe Freeman
Lead Analyst	Ronnie Swash
Senior Therapist	Ciaran Pack
Associate Therapist	Lewis Herbert
Kit Manager	Loretta Browne

== Honours ==
- National League
  - League Cup winners 2025–26
- Isthmian League
  - Division One champions 1976–77, 1994–95, 2000–01
  - League Cup winners 1996–97
- Southern League
  - Division One East champions 2005–06
- Athenian League
  - Division One champions 1973–74
  - Division Two champions 1968–69
- Parthenon League
  - Champions 1955–56
- Herts Senior Cup
  - Winners 1971–72, 1998–99, 2001–02, 2007–08, 2013–14, 2017–18, 2018–19
- Herts Charity Cup
  - Winners 1980–81, 1983–84, 1985–86, 1988–89, 1989–90
- London Challenge Cup
  - Winners 1997–98

== Records ==
- Best league performance: 4th in the National League, 2017–18, 2025–26
- Best FA Cup performance: Fifth round, 2021–22
- Best FA Amateur Cup performance: Third round, 1970–71
- Best FA Trophy performance: Semi-finals, 2005–06
- Record attendance: 4,101 vs St Albans City, FA Cup second round, 6 December 2021
- Most appearances: David Hatchett, 714
- Most goals: Mickey Jackson
- Record transfer fee paid: £18,000 to Dagenham & Redbridge for Morgan Ferrier
- Record transfer fee received: £1.5 million from Djurgårdens IF for Abdul Abdulmalik

== See also ==
- Boreham Wood F.C. players
- Boreham Wood F.C. managers
