= 1993–94 West Ham United F.C. season =

English football team season

West Ham United
1993–94 season
- Chairman: Terry Brown
- Manager: Billy Bonds
- Stadium: Boleyn Ground
- FA Premier League: 13th
- FA Cup: Quarter finals
- League Cup: Third round
- Top goalscorer: League: Trevor Morley (13); All: Trevor Morley (16)
- Average home league attendance: 20,572
Home colours

During the 1993–94 English football season, West Ham United F.C. competed in the FA Premier League.

== Season summary ==
West Ham United made a solid return to the top flight a year after being relegated, as they overcame the sale of captain Julian Dicks to Liverpool and achieved a 13th-place finish in the Premiership. Their form throughout the season was solid and they were never seriously threatened by relegation, and they even finished above their expensively-assembled local rivals Tottenham. The veteran striker-partnership of Trevor Morley and Lee Chapman scored goals at a decent rate and rarely showed much sign of their age (32 and 34 respectively). It was a solid season from a hard-working but unremarkable squad who defied the odds to keep clear of trouble without making a serious bid for honours.

== Final league table ==
Pos	Team	Pld	W	D	L	GF	GA	GD	Pts	Qualification or relegation
11	Coventry City	42	14	14	14	43	45	−2	56	
12	Norwich City	42	12	17	13	65	61	+4	53	
13	West Ham United	42	13	13	16	47	58	−11	52	
14	Chelsea	42	13	12	17	49	53	−4	51	Qualification for the Cup Winners' Cup first round (Note: Chelsea qualified for the Cup Winners' Cup as FA Cup runners-up, as winners Manchester United qualified for the Champions League.)
15	Tottenham Hotspur	42	11	12	19	54	59	−5	45	

Source: Premier League
Rules for classification: 1) points; 2) goal difference; 3) number of goals scored.

== Results ==
West Ham United's score comes first

=== Legend ===
Win	Draw	Loss

=== FA Premier League ===
Date	Opponent	Venue	Result	Scorers	Attendance
14 August 1993	Wimbledon	H	0–2		20,369
17 August 1993	Leeds United	A	0–1		34,588
21 August 1993	Coventry City	A	1–1	Gordon	12,864
25 August 1993	Sheffield Wednesday	H	2–0	C Allen (2)	19,441
28 August 1993	Queens Park Rangers	H	0–4		18,084
1 September 1993	Manchester United	A	0–3		44,613
11 September 1993	Swindon Town	H	0–0		15,777
18 September 1993	Blackburn Rovers	A	2–0	Morley, Chapman	14,437
25 September 1993	Newcastle United	A	0–2		34,179
2 October 1993	Chelsea	H	1–0	Morley	18,917
16 October 1993	Aston Villa	H	0–0		20,416
23 October 1993	Norwich City	A	0–0		20,175
1 November 1993	Manchester City	H	3–1	Holmes, Chapman, Burrows	16,605
6 November 1993	Liverpool	A	0–2		42,254
20 November 1993	Oldham Athletic	H	2–0	Martin, Morley	17,211
24 November 1993	Arsenal	H	0–0		20,279
29 November 1993	Southampton	A	2–0	Chapman, Morley	13,258
4 December 1993	Wimbledon	A	2–1	Chapman (2)	10,903
8 December 1993	Leeds United	H	0–1		20,468
11 December 1993	Coventry City	H	3–2	Butler, Morley (pen), Breacker	17,243
18 December 1993	Sheffield Wednesday	A	0–5		26,350
27 December 1993	Ipswich Town	A	1–1	Chapman	21,024
28 December 1993	Tottenham Hotspur	H	1–3	Holmes	20,787
1 January 1994	Everton	A	1–0	Breacker	19,602
3 January 1994	Sheffield United	H	0–0		20,365
15 January 1994	Aston Villa	A	1–3	M Allen	28,869
24 January 1994	Norwich City	H	3–3	Morley, Sutton (own goal), Chapman	20,738
12 February 1994	Manchester City	A	0–0		29,118
26 February 1994	Manchester United	H	2–2	Chapman, Morley	28,832
5 March 1994	Swindon Town	A	1–1	Morley	15,929
19 March 1994	Newcastle United	H	2–4	Breacker, Martin	23,132
26 March 1994	Chelsea	A	0–2		19,545
28 March 1994	Sheffield United	A	2–3	Holmes, Bishop	13,646
2 April 1994	Ipswich Town	H	2–1	Morley, Rush	18,307
4 April 1994	Tottenham Hotspur	A	4–1	Morley (2, 1 pen), Jones, Marsh	31,502
9 April 1994	Everton	H	0–1		20,243
16 April 1994	Oldham Athletic	A	2–1	M Allen, Morley	11,669
23 April 1994	Liverpool	H	1–2	M Allen	26,106
27 April 1994	Blackburn Rovers	H	1–2	M Allen	22,186
30 April 1994	Arsenal	A	2–0	Morley, M Allen	33,700
3 May 1994	Queens Park Rangers	A	0–0		10,850
7 May 1994	Southampton	H	3–3	Williamson, Monkou (own goal), M Allen	26,952

=== FA Cup ===
Round	Date	Opponent	Venue	Result	Goalscorers	Attendance
R3	8 January 1994	Watford	H	2–1	M Allen, Marsh	19,802
R4	29 January 1994	Notts County	A	1–1	Jones	14,952
R4R	9 February 1994	Notts County	H	1–0	Chapman	23,373
R5	19 February 1994	Kidderminster Harriers	A	1–0	Chapman	8,000
QF	14 March 1994	Luton Town	H	0–0		27,331
QFR	23 March 1994	Luton Town	A	2–3	M Allen, Bishop	13,166

=== League Cup ===
Round	Date	Opponent	Venue	Result	Goalscorers	Attendance
R2 1st leg	22 September 1993	Chesterfield	H	5–1	Chapman (2), Morley (2, 1 pen), Burrows	12,823
R2 2nd leg	5 October 1993	Chesterfield	A	2–0 (won 7–1 on agg)	Boere, M Allen	4,890
R3	27 October 1993	Nottingham Forest	A	1–2	Morley	17,857

== First-team squad ==
Squad at end of season

Note: Flags indicate national team as defined under FIFA eligibility rules; some limited exceptions apply. Players may hold more than one non-FIFA nationality.

No.	Pos.	Nation	Player
1	GK	(Czech Republic) CZE	Luděk Mikloško
2	DF	(England) ENG	Tim Breacker
4	DF	(England) ENG	Steve Potts (captain)
5	DF	(England) ENG	Simon Webster
6	MF	(England) ENG	Martin Allen
8	MF	(England) ENG	Peter Butler
9	FW	(England) ENG	Trevor Morley
11	MF	(England) ENG	Dale Gordon
12	DF	(England) ENG	Tony Gale
13	GK	(Republic of Ireland) IRL	Gary Kelly (on loan from Bury)
14	MF	(England) ENG	Ian Bishop
15	DF	(England) ENG	Kenny Brown
16	MF	(England) ENG	Matty Holmes
17	FW	(England) ENG	Steve Jones

No.	Pos.	Nation	Player
18	DF	(England) ENG	Alvin Martin
20	MF	(England) ENG	Danny Williamson
21	MF	(Republic of Ireland) IRL	Matt Holland
23	DF	(Northern Ireland) NIR	Keith Rowland
24	MF	(England) ENG	Paul Mitchell
25	FW	(England) ENG	Lee Chapman
28	MF	(England) ENG	Matthew Rush
29	MF	(England) ENG	Scott Canham
30	MF	(England) ENG	Darren Currie
32	FW	(England) ENG	David Pratt
33	DF	(England) ENG	David Burrows
34	MF	(England) ENG	Mike Marsh
35	FW	(Netherlands) NED	Jeroen Boere
36	GK	(England) ENG	Martin Peat

=== Left club during season ===
Note: Flags indicate national team as defined under FIFA eligibility rules; some limited exceptions apply. Players may hold more than one non-FIFA nationality.

No.	Pos.	Nation	Player
3	DF	(England) ENG	Julian Dicks (captain; to Liverpool)
7	MF	(England) ENG	Mark Robson (to Charlton Athletic)
10	FW	(England) ENG	Clive Allen (to Millwall)
13	GK	(Republic of Ireland) IRL	Gerry Peyton (retired)
19	FW	(Canada) CAN	Alex Bunbury (to Marítimo)
22	DF	(England) ENG	Colin Foster (on loan to Notts County; sold to Watford)

No.	Pos.	Nation	Player
26	DF	(England) ENG	Mike Basham (to Swansea City)
27	DF	(England) ENG	Paul Marquis (to Doncaster Rovers)
28	MF	(England) ENG	Matthew Rush (on loan to Swansea City)
31	FW	(England) ENG	Paul Whitmarsh (to Doncaster Rovers)
—	FW	(England) ENG	Mike Small (on loan to Wolverhampton Wanderers and Charlton Athletic)

== Transfers ==
=== Out ===
- Colin Foster – Notts County, loan
- Colin Foster – Watford, March
- Mark Robson – Charlton Athletic, November

== Statistics ==
=== Appearances and goals ===
No.	Pos	Nat	Player	Total		Premier League		FA Cup		League Cup	
No.	Pos	Nat	Player	Apps	Goals	Apps	Goals	Apps	Goals	Apps	Goals
Goalkeepers
1	GK	(Czech Republic) CZE	Luděk Mikloško	51	0	42	0	6	0	3	0
Defenders
2	DF	(England) ENG	Tim Breacker	48	3	40	3	6	0	2	0
4	DF	(England) ENG	Steve Potts	50	0	41	0	6	0	3	0
12	DF	(England) ENG	Tony Gale	35	0	31+1	0	1	0	2	0
15	DF	(England) ENG	Kenny Brown	12	0	6+3	0	2+1	0	0	0
18	DF	(England) ENG	Alvin Martin	11	2	6+1	2	3	0	1	0
23	DF	(Northern Ireland) NIR	Keith Rowland	28	0	16+7	0	4	0	1	0
33	DF	(England) ENG	David Burrows	31	2	25	1	3	0	3	1
Midfielders
6	MF	(England) ENG	Martin Allen	34	10	20+6	7	6	2	0+2	1
8	MF	(England) ENG	Peter Butler	29	1	26	1	1	0	2	0
11	MF	(England) ENG	Dale Gordon	9	1	8	1	0	0	1	0
14	MF	(England) ENG	Ian Bishop	45	2	36	1	6	1	3	0
16	MF	(England) ENG	Matty Holmes	41	3	33+1	3	4	0	3	0
20	MF	(England) ENG	Danny Williamson	3	1	2+1	1	0	0	0	0
24	MF	(England) ENG	Paul Mitchell	1	0	0+1	0	0	0	0	0
28	MF	(England) ENG	Matthew Rush	10	1	9+1	1	0	0	0	0
34	MF	(England) ENG	Mike Marsh	42	2	33	1	6	1	3	0
Forwards
9	FW	(England) ENG	Trevor Morley	49	16	39+3	13	3+1	0	3	3
17	FW	(England) ENG	Steve Jones	12	3	3+5	2	2+2	1	0	0
25	FW	(England) ENG	Lee Chapman	39	12	26+4	8	6	2	3	2
35	FW	(Netherlands) NED	Jeroen Boere	5	1	0+4	0	0	0	0+1	1
Players who left the club permanently or on loan during the season
3	DF	(England) ENG	Julian Dicks	7	0	7	0	0	0	0	0
7	MF	(England) ENG	Mark Robson	3	0	1+2	0	0	0	0	0
10	FW	(England) ENG	Clive Allen	10	2	7	2	1+2	0	0	0
22	DF	(England) ENG	Colin Foster	5	0	5	0	0	0	0	0
27	DF	(England) ENG	Paul Marquis	1	0	0+1	0	0	0	0	0
