= Clive Allen =

English footballer (born 1961)

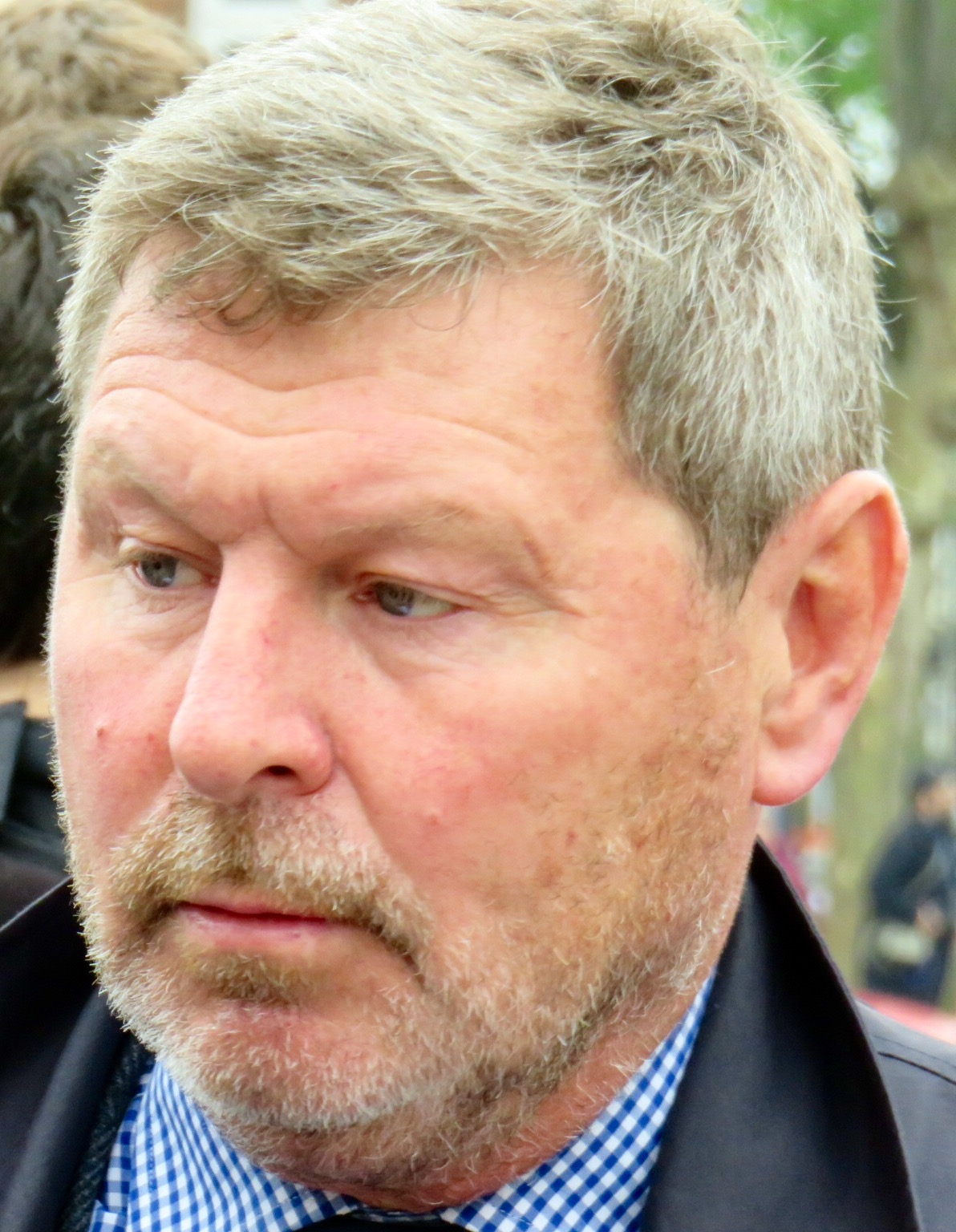
- Allen in 2016

Personal information
- Birth name: Clive Darren Allen
- Date of birth: 20 May 1961 (age 65)
- Place of birth: Stepney, London, England
- Height: 5 ft 10 in (1.78 m)
- Position: Forward

Youth career
- Havering/Essex Schools
- Romford Juniors

Senior career*
Years	Team	Apps	(Gls)
1978–1980	Queens Park Rangers	49	(32)
1980	Arsenal	0	(0)
1980–1981	Crystal Palace	25	(9)
1981–1984	Queens Park Rangers	87	(40)
1984–1988	Tottenham Hotspur	105	(60)
1988–1989	Bordeaux	19	(13)
1989–1991	Manchester City	53	(16)
1991–1992	Chelsea	16	(7)
1992–1994	West Ham United	38	(17)
1994–1995	Millwall	12	(0)
1995	Carlisle United	3	(0)
Total		407	(194)

International career
1976	England Schoolboys	7	(1)
1978–1979	England Youth	13	(3)
1980	England U21	3	(0)
1984–1988	England	5	(0)

Managerial career
- 2007: Tottenham Hotspur (caretaker)
- 2008: Tottenham Hotspur (caretaker)
Football career
No. 9
Position	Placekicker
Career history
1997	London Monarchs
Career statistics
PAT: 7/10; FG: 6/6
- * Club domestic league appearances and goals

Clive Darren Allen (born 20 May 1961) is an English former professional footballer who played as a forward for seven different London clubs. Allen was a prolific striker throughout his career.

In 1986-87 he won the PFA and Football Writers' Association player of the year awards. He also won 5 caps for England from 1984 to 1988.

== Early life ==
Clive Allen was born in Stepney, London on 20 May 1961. His father, Les Allen, was a member of Tottenham Hotspur's Double-winning team of 1960–61. His younger brother, Bradley Allen, and cousins Martin and Paul Allen also played football professionally.

== Club career ==
=== Queens Park Rangers ===
Allen started his career at Queens Park Rangers in the late 1970s. He made his league debut coming on as a substitute at home against Chelsea in November 1978 and scored 32 league goals in 49 appearances which included a hat trick on his full debut at home to Coventry later the same season, before moving to Arsenal.

=== Arsenal ===
Allen signed for Arsenal in the summer of 1980 for a fee of £1.25m. He did not play a competitive match for the club, although he did play three pre-season matches. He soon moved on to Crystal Palace in a swap deal with Kenny Sansom.

=== Crystal Palace ===
Allen was Palace's top scorer for the 1980–81 season with nine goals in the league and 11 in all competitions, when Palace finished bottom of the First Division.

In one of his earliest games for the club, Allen was at the centre of a notable incident in the defeat against Coventry City on 6 September 1980, when his shot flew into the goal and rebounded from the stanchion holding up the netting so quickly that it was ruled not a goal, the referee mistakenly ruling that the ball had hit the frame of the goal. As highlights of the match were being televised by the BBC, the incident was captured on camera.

=== Return to Queens Park Rangers ===
QPR, still in the Second Division, were now managed by Terry Venables (who had signed Allen for Palace) and in Allen's first season back at the club (1981–82) he scored 13 Second Division goals, though not enough to win promotion. QPR also reached the FA Cup final for the first time with Allen scoring the goals in 1–0 victories in both the sixth Round (vs Crystal Palace) and semi-final (vs West Bromwich Albion). Allen was injured in the final against Tottenham Hotspur and subsequently missed the replay.

Over the next two seasons, Allen scored 27 League goals as QPR first won the Second Division Championship in 1982–83 and then finished fifth in the First Division in 1983–84. He moved to Tottenham for a £700,000 fee.

=== Tottenham Hotspur ===
Allen scored twice on his debut on 25 August 1984, a 4–1 away win at Everton, and scored 10 goals from 18 appearances in his first season, in which Spurs finished third behind Liverpool and Everton.

In 1986–87 he scored 33 League goals, and 49 goals in all competitions, a record for the club. He scored, but was on the losing side alongside his cousin Paul Allen, in the 1987 FA Cup Final. That season he also won the PFA Player of the Year and Football Writers' Association Footballer of the Year awards.

=== Bordeaux ===
Allen moved from Spurs to join Bordeaux in March 1988, scoring 13 goals in 19 league games.

=== Later career ===
In July 1989 Allen joined Manchester City, who had just been promoted to the First Division. He scored 10 league goals in his first season, but only four goals in 1990–91. He managed three appearances and scored twice in the league for City the following season, and was transferred to Chelsea in December 1991.

He scored seven goals in 16 games over the next three months with Chelsea, scoring the winning goal in an FA Cup fourth-round tie against Everton. He then joined West Ham United in March 1992, scoring once in four league games, but was unable to stop them from being relegated.

He scored 14 goals in the 1992–93 Division One campaign as West Ham were promoted as runners-up. His goal on the last day of the season, against Cambridge United, secured promotion to the Premier League. He played just seven league games in the 1993–94 in the Premier League, scoring two goals against Sheffield Wednesday in August 1993. He also scored West Ham's first goal in the Bobby Moore Memorial Match in a 2–1 win against a Premier League XI at Upton Park in March 1994. He played his final game for West Ham later in the same month in a 0–0 FA Cup sixth-round game at Upton Park against Luton Town, coming on as a substitute for Lee Chapman.

In January 1994, when Allen was out of favour at West Ham United, Tottenham manager Ossie Ardiles (who had been his Tottenham team-mate the previous decade) expressed interest in bringing Allen back to White Hart Lane as he looked to spend up to £500,000 on a striker to cover for the injured Teddy Sheringham, but the transfer did not happen. Allen opted to drop down a division and join Millwall for a fee of £75,000.

He ended his career with three league games for Carlisle United in 1995–96.

== International career ==
In the summer of 1984, Allen was given his first England cap against Brazil. In total he made five appearances for England without scoring.

== American football career ==
In 1997, Allen played American football as a placekicker for the London Monarchs of NFL Europe. He converted six of six field goals and seven of ten extra points.

== Personal life ==
His son Oliver is also a footballer. In 2019, Allen published his autobiography, Up Front: My Autobiography. Allen also works as a commentator on ESPN and BT Sport predominantly for coverage of Ligue 1, Bundesliga, FA Cup, and UEFA club competitions, and occasionally coverage of Tottenham matches on SpursPlay, the official Tottenham Hotspur streaming service.

== Career statistics ==
=== Club ===
Appearances and goals by club, season and competition
Club	Season	League			National cup		League cup		Europe		Total	
Club	Season	Division	Apps	Goals	Apps	Goals	Apps	Goals	Apps	Goals	Apps	Goals
Queens Park Rangers	1978–79	First Division	10	4					—		10	4
Queens Park Rangers	1979–80	Second Division	39	28					—		39	28
Queens Park Rangers	Total		49	32					—		49	32
Crystal Palace	1980–81	First Division	25	9					—		25	9
Queens Park Rangers	1981–82	Second Division	37	13	2	1			—		39	14
Queens Park Rangers	1982–83	Second Division	25	13					—		25	13
Queens Park Rangers	1983–84	First Division	25	14					—		25	14
Queens Park Rangers	Total		87	40	2	1			—		89	41
Tottenham Hotspur	1984–85	First Division	13	7					4 (Note: Appearances in UEFA Cup)	2	17	9
Tottenham Hotspur	1985–86	First Division	19	9					—		19	9
Tottenham Hotspur	1986–87	First Division	39	33	6	4	9	12	—		54	49
Tottenham Hotspur	1987–88	First Division	34	11					—		34	11
Tottenham Hotspur	Total		105	60	2	4			4	2	173	112
Bordeaux	1988–89	Division 1	19	13					3	0	22	13
Manchester City	1989–90	First Division	30	10					—		30	10
Manchester City	1990–91	First Division	20	4					—		20	4
Manchester City	1991–92	First Division	3	2					—		3	2
Manchester City	Total		53	16					—		53	16
Chelsea	1991–92	First Division	16	7					—		16	7
West Ham United	1991–92	First Division	4	1					—		4	1
West Ham United	1992–93	First Division	27	16					—		33	21
West Ham United	1993–94	Premier League	7	2	3	0	1	0	—		11	2
West Ham United	Total		38	17	3	0	1	0	—		42	17
Millwall	1994–95	First Division	12	0					—		12	0
Carlisle United	1995–96	Second Division	3	0					—		3	0
Career total			407	194	7	3	1	0	7	2	422	199

== Honours ==
Queens Park Rangers

- Football League Second Division: 1982–83

Tottenham Hotspur

- FA Cup runner-up: 1986–87

Individual

- PFA Players' Player of the Year: 1987
- Football Writers' Association Footballer of the Year: 1987
- PFA Team of the Year: 1986–87 First Division
