= West Ham United F.C. Under-21s and Academy =

Coordinates: 51.569983°N 0.146339°E

West Ham United Under-21s
- Full name: West Ham United Football Club (Under-21s)
- Nicknames: The Irons; The Hammers; The Academy of Football
- Short name: WHU U21s
- Ground: Rush Green Stadium, Romford, London, England
- Capacity: 6,078
- Owner(s): Daniel Křetínský (46%); David Sullivan (40%); J. Albert "Tripp" Smith (11%); Other Investors (3%)
- Manager: Greg Lincoln (interim)
- League: Premier League 2
- 2024–25: Premier League 2, 4th of 26
- Website: whufc.com/en/teams/under-21
Home colours	Away colours	Third colours

The Academy of West Ham United F.C. is historically one of the most productive football academies in British football. This success has resulted in its nickname the Academy of Football.

The introduction of the FA's new academy system in 1998 has placed even more emphasis on the development of young homegrown players, and today the youth system at West Ham is more important than it has ever been. With the influx of many foreign players in the Premier League during modern times, West Ham United has been regarded as one of the few remaining clubs in the top flight to continue producing and playing homegrown English players.

The Under-21 team is the most senior of West Ham's youth squads. The Under-21 team is effectively the club's second-string side but is limited to five outfield players and one goalkeeper over the age of 21 per game following the introduction of new regulations from the 2022–23 season. They play in Premier League 2 and also compete in the Vertu Trophy.

== The Academy of Football ==
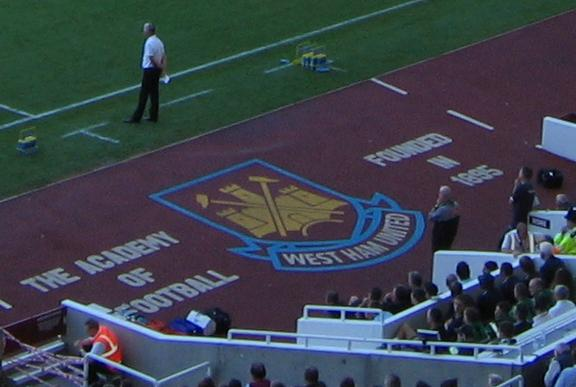
"Academy of Football" livery at Upton Park

'The Academy of Football' , or just 'The academy,' is a nickname of West Ham United. The title pays homage to the success of the club in coaching talented young players. The title, originally attributed to the club by the press, has since been officially adopted by the club and is displayed in several prominent places around the stadium such as being printed beside the club crest on the artificial surface surrounding the pitch at Upton Park.

The original tribute intended to reference the entire culture of the club in much the same way as the Liverpool "Boot Room". It was not solely reserved for the education of young players but also for the development of a modern approach to football from the roots up, as inspired by the success of the Hungarian national team featuring Ferenc Puskás that had humiliated England 6–3, and the great Real Madrid side of the late 1950s that dominated the European Cup.

=== Academy history ===
The 'Academy of Football' term was first used in the early years of Ron Greenwood's reign as West Ham manager (1961–1974). Greenwood had inherited a young team of players from Ted Fenton, and the club was noted for its reliance on homegrown talent with Bobby Moore, Martin Peters, Geoff Hurst, John Lyall, Ronnie Boyce, John Sissons, Alan Sealey and Harry Redknapp all in the first team or periphery. Further foundations had been laid with stalwart Ken Brown at the back, Malcolm Musgrove on the left wing (who was to leave in the second season), and the addition of John "Budgie" Byrne upfront.

The true heritage of this side, however, owed its pedigree to the practices put in place by the previous manager.

Fenton was praised as a forward-thinking manager. He pushed for the establishment of "The Academy," which brought through a series of young players to augment a side that could not be improved with the limited finances available. Two of the signings he did manage to make were those of John Dick and Malcolm Allison. Other players of the day included John Bond, Dave Sexton, Jimmy Andrews and Frank O'Farrell (later swapped for Eddie Lewis) and Tommy Moroney all part of an original 'Cafe Cassettari' club started by Fenton as a result of the restrictive budget.

There [Cafe Cassettari], Allison would hold court, and the players would exchange views on the game and make tactical plans around the dinner table, illustrating their ideas with the use of salt and pepper pots. The culmination of those years of hard work, on and off the field, was the Second Division championship in 1958 – the springboard to great cup successes at a much higher level in the mid-60s ... no one should underestimate the positive influence of Malcolm Allison's earlier role in Hammers' history.

— West Ham Club History, John Hellier

Cassettari's Café sat opposite the Boleyn Ground, and Fenton organized a deal that saw meals and a warm welcome for the club players at a price the club could manage. It became a place for routine team discussion, and ideas and wisdom freely passed back and forth. The tradition of mentorship lasted long into the 1960s even after Fenton had moved on and saw future managers John Lyall and Harry Redknapp pass through. West Ham, with meetings at Cassettari's Café, soon gained a reputation for producing managers via playing for the club including Malcolm Allison, Noel Cantwell, Frank O'Farrell, John Bond, Dave Sexton, Jimmy Andrews and Malcolm Musgrove.

Fenton introduced continental ideas to the team, revamping training methods, and taking inspiration from higher-ranked teams. Fenton had been impressed greatly by the all-conquering Hungarians of the 1950s led by Ferenc Puskás, and the Cassettari program and development of the academy were at the core. Ernie Gregory said (of the 1950s diet) "We'd usually eaten fish or chicken and toast before then, but Dr. Thomas advised us all to eat steak and rice two hours before kick-off. All the other clubs copied us after that". However, not all the changes were strictly down to Fenton, Musgrove attributed much of the training regime to Allison, going so far as to state that once the players were at the club (signed by Fenton) they were pretty much Allison's property. As well as being a student of the game himself, Fenton encouraged all players to take coaching badges and, notably, many of his former players went on to coaching and managing roles after they retired. The academy also involved, beyond the routine training and development of the youth and squad, actual tactical discussions between the players.

At this time, three players who had come through the West Ham youth development system were beginning to find success in the England squad; they were Bobby Moore who debuted in 1962, Geoff Hurst and Martin Peters. In 1966, these players played a part in England's victory in the World Cup.

Moore was the most well-known of the three. He captained the England squad and was later named by Pelé as the "greatest" of all the defenders he had played against.

In the World Cup final against West Germany in which England won 4–2, Hurst scored the first hat-trick ever scored at a World Cup final match, and Peters scored the other goal. This gave rise to the West Ham supporters' partly sarcastic terrace chant:

I remember Wembley,
When West Ham beat West Germany.
Peters one and Geoffrey three,
And Bobby got his OBE!

A bronze statue of these three players (and Everton defender Ray Wilson) holding the Jules Rimet Trophy aloft was erected in 2003 at the junction of Barking Road and Green Street close to Upton Park.

During the next thirty years, West Ham's youth academy produced many professional players. Notable Academy "graduates" during this time include Frank Lampard Sr. and (later Sir) Trevor Brooking, who both featured in the club's 1975 FA Cup win with a team composed solely of English players; no club since has repeated this accomplishment.

Since 1973 the academy has been managed by Tony Carr, himself a "graduate" but whose career was cut short by injury.

Paul Ince played his first game for West Ham in 1986, and went on to win more trophies than any other Academy "graduate", albeit with Manchester United.

==== Premier League era ====
In 1996, the reputation of the academy began a fresh revival with the arrival of Rio Ferdinand and Frank Lampard Jnr. That year, the West Ham youth team reached the FA Youth Cup Final, losing to a Liverpool side inspired by Michael Owen. However, both Ferdinand and Lampard would see success in subsequent years.

In 1999, the West Ham youth team won the FA Youth Cup, beating Coventry City 9–0 on aggregate. The team featured Joe Cole and Michael Carrick. Ferdinand and Carrick played against Lampard and Cole when Manchester United met Chelsea at the 2008 UEFA Champions League final.

Recent Academy "graduates" include Glen Johnson, Billy Mehmet, Freddy Eastwood, Anton Ferdinand (younger brother of Rio), Elliott Ward, Mark Noble, Jack Collison, James Tomkins and Declan Rice.

During the 2022–23 season, West Ham's under-18 won 26 out of 30 games in all competitions, winning the U18 Premier League South and the FA Youth Cup, beating Arsenal 5–1 at the Emirates Stadium to lift the trophy for the fourth time.

== Relationship with West Ham United ==
The academy is an important part of the club's identity and a regular source of players for the first team. When the club was relegated from the FA Premier League in 2003, the sale of young Academy stars arguably saved the club from financial disaster. It has been argued that if West Ham had kept all of their Academy "graduates" since Rio Ferdinand, they would currently be among the very top English teams.

With their promotion via the Championship Play-Offs in 2005 West Ham have returned to England's top league. Three Academy "graduates" had been key players in this achievement; Anton Ferdinand, Elliott Ward, and Mark Noble. In the 2007–08 season, manager Alan Curbishley handed three graduates, Jack Collison, James Tomkins and Freddie Sears, their debuts.

Gianfranco Zola, who previously worked with the Italy U21's, stated his desire to continue the club's tradition of using homegrown talent. Noble, Tomkins and Collison all went on to play an important part as West Ham beat relegation to finish 9th in the 2008–09 season. Under him, Zavon Hines and Junior Stanislas have impressed after the August 2009 League Cup match against Millwall where they both scored in a 3–1 win.

=== West Ham as a 'selling club' ===
A case may be made that West Ham has been a 'selling club' in recent years, that is, a club that provides quality players to other clubs for profit but does not have the prestige or financial means to keep those players for the benefit of their own team. This reputation probably began with the sale of Rio Ferdinand to Leeds United in 2000. Since then, West Ham has sold six Academy "graduates" for transfer fees totaling over £50 million (including £18 million for Ferdinand, who was later sold on to Manchester United for £30 million). This amount has traditionally been much greater than the club's own spending on players (most of which was financed by the above income), and many of the players found success with financially stronger clubs such as Chelsea and Manchester United who are two of the English clubs capable of competing on a different level to most other teams.

Though not a club, the England national team has included various academy apprentices or graduates in recent years, including Rio Ferdinand, Michael Carrick, Frank Lampard, Joe Cole, Jermain Defoe and Glen Johnson, as well as John Terry who spent part of his development with the club.

== Quotes ==
"The crowds at West Ham have never been rewarded by results but they keep turning up because of the good football they see. Other clubs will suffer from the old bugbear that results count more than anything. This has been the ruination of English soccer." – Ron Greenwood, West Ham manager 1961–1974.

"No way is it all down to me. It's very difficult to say why we've been so successful in youth terms; I suppose it's down to a number of factors but, most importantly, our recruitment area of east London and Essex is really fertile." – Tony Carr, director of Youth Development at West Ham 1973–2010, quoted in an interview published by The Daily Telegraph 14 June 2004.

"Why should we sell Rio Ferdinand? Are we a Premier League club or are we just a feeder club for bigger clubs? If we start selling players like Rio, where is the club going to go?" – Harry Redknapp, West Ham manager 1994–2001.

"The biggest single contributor to the current England national squad is not Manchester United, Arsenal, Liverpool or Chelsea, but the West Ham Youth Academy." – ITV Football article, 13 September 2004.

== Reserve team history ==
The West Ham United Reserves Team was founded in 1899 as Thames Ironworks Reserves and they changed their name to West Ham Reserves in 1900. They joined London League Division One in the season 1899–1900. In 2007–08 they were FA Premier Reserve League Southern Division runners-up on goal difference.

=== 'A' team ===
Between 1948 and 1956 West Ham entered an 'A' team into the Eastern Counties League. In 1952 they also began playing in the Metropolitan League. After leaving the ECL they remained in the Metropolitan League, winning the League Cup in 1957–58 and the Professional Cup in 1959–60, 1966–67 and 1968–69. They left the league when it merged into the Metropolitan London League in 1971, and instead entered a youth team into the South East Counties League, which they won in 1984–85, 1995–96, and 1997–98, before leaving when the FA Academy system was set up in 1998.

== Under-21 team ==
The West Ham United Reserves competed in the Premier Reserve League South until relegation from the Premier League in 2011.

Since the 2012–13 season, the team has played in the Professional Development League (now branded Premier League 2) for players under the age of 21 and a restricted number of over-age players. As of October 2025, they have been coached in interim by Head of Coaching and Player Development Greg Lincoln following the promotion of U21 staff to the first team under Nuno Espírito Santo. Most home matches are played at West Ham's training ground (Rush Green), with three fixtures per season played at the London Stadium, as well as some cup competitions being played at Dagenham & Redbridge F.C.’s Victoria Road stadium.

=== Current squad ===
Includes first team players who age-qualify and who have represented the U21's in the 2026–27 season.

As of 24 August 2026

- ^{U18} represents an U18 squad player who has represented the U21s in the 2026–27 season.
- ^{U16} represents an U16 squad player (a non-scholar) who has represented the U21s in the 2026–27 season.
- ^{†} represents a player who represented the U21s in the 2026–27 season before later leaving the club.
- Squad numbers represent numbers given to players for first team and EFL Trophy matches only.

Note: Flags indicate national team as defined under FIFA eligibility rules; some limited exceptions apply. Players may hold more than one non-FIFA nationality.

No.	Pos.	Nation	Player
17	MF	FRA	Mohamadou Kanté
30	DF	ENG	Oliver Scarles
36	GK	IRL	Reece Byrne
37	DF	FRA	Dimitri Colau
44	DF	ENG	Junior Robinson (Regular Captain)
47	MF	ENG	Connor Brooks
49	GK	ENG	Finlay Herrick
51	DF	NIR	Josh Briggs (Captain)
57	FW	ENG	Jett Murphy
58	DF	ENG	Airidas Golambeckis
61	MF	ENG	Lewis Orford
63	DF	ENG	Ezra Mayers
64	DF	ENG	Ryan Battrum
66	FW	ENG	Joshua Ajala
67	FW	ENG	Riley Hargan
68	MF	ENG	Preston Fearon (Captain)
71	MF	ENG	Gabriel Caliste

No.	Pos.	Nation	Player
74	DF	LTU	Tomas Jonyla ^{U18}
75	DF	ENG	Jethro Medine
77	GK	ENG	Lanre Awesu
78	GK	ENG	Finley Hooper
81	DF	MAS	Harry Montague ^{U18}
79	MF	NIR	Joel Kerr ^{U18}
—	MF	ENG	Lewis Beckford
80	FW	ENG	Andre Dike (Captain)
82	MF	ENG	Aaron Kamara
85	FW	ENG	Majid Balogun
88	MF	ENG	Reggie Morris-Agyemang ^{U18}
89	MF	ENG	Tyrone Omotoye ^{U18}
91	FW	ENG	Jephthah Medine ^{U18}
92	FW	DEN	Chukwumeka Obi ^{U18}
94	FW	NIR	Callum Leacock
—	GK	ENG	Felix Ayesta ^{U18}
—	MF	WAL	Isaac Thomas ^{U18}
—	DF	JAM	Reon Smith ^{U18}
—	MF	ENG	Jude Longman ^{U16}
—	MF	ENG	Nima Ghandali (On Trial From Kingstonian FC)^{U18}

=== Out on loan ===
Note: Flags indicate national team as defined under FIFA eligibility rules; some limited exceptions apply. Players may hold more than one non-FIFA nationality.

No.	Pos.	Nation	Player
42	DF	ENG	Kaelan Casey (on loan at Scunthorpe United until 1 July 2027)
43	DF	ENG	Regan Clayton (Captain) (on loan at Scunthorpe United until 13 December 2027)
46	GK	ENG	Mason Terry (on loan at Yeovil Town F.C. until 13th December 2026)
48	FW	SCO	Josh Landers (on loan at Ayr United until 1 July 2027)
52	DF	ENG	Luis Brown (on loan at Braintree Town until 2 January 2027)
53	FW	SCO	Daniel Cummings (on loan at Aldershot Town F.C. until 13th December 2026)
76	DF	GRE	Rayan Oyebade (on loan at Southend United until 1 July 2027)

== Under-18 team ==
The West Ham under-18's play in the U18 Premier League South. Home games are staged at Little Heath, Hainault Road in Romford, Essex. Tony Carr, a former West Ham player himself, was the youth academy director from 1973 to 2014. They have won the U19 title twice in 1998–99 and 1999–2000, when the Academy League was split into the U17s and U21s.

=== Current squad ===
As of 15 August 2026

- ^{U16} represents an U16 squad player (a non-scholar) who has represented the U18s in the 2026–27 season.
- ^{†} represents a player who represented the U18s in the 2026–27 season before later leaving the club.

Note: Flags indicate national team as defined under FIFA eligibility rules; some limited exceptions apply. Players may hold more than one non-FIFA nationality.

No.	Pos.	Nation	Player
73	DF	ENG	Vinnie Perkins
74	DF	LTU	Tomas Jonyla
79	MF	NIR	Joel Kerr
81	DF	MAS	Harry Montague
87	MF	ENG	Joe Scanlon
88	MF	ENG	Reggie Morris-Agyemang (Regular Captain)
89	MF	ENG	Tyrone Omotoye
90	MF	BUL	Martin Peychev
91	FW	ENG	Jephthah Medine
92	FW	DEN	Chukwumeka Obi
—	GK	ENG	Felix Ayesta
—	GK	ENG	Jack Tomlin
—	MF	WAL	Isaac Thomas (Captain)
—	CF	WAL	Frankie Day

No.	Pos.	Nation	Player
—	DF	JAM	Reon Smith (Captain)
—	DF	ALB	Glenn Macaj
—	MF	ALB	Christian Lila
—	CF	ENG	Bailey Pammenter
—	CF	ENG	Christlife Mandungu
—	MF	ENG	Mitchell Brown
—	MF	NIR	Zak Magowan
—	MF	ENG	Lenny Noble
—	MF	ENG	Charles Gadson
—	DF	ITA	Arnaldo Ugate
—	DF	ENG	Concilio Tonebi ^{U16}
—	MF	ENG	Jude Longman ^{U16}
—	DF	ENG	Immanuel Adisa ^{U16}
—	MF	ENG	Kanyechukwuekele Okorie ^{U16}
—	MF	ENG	Ivanildo Batista ^{U16}
—	CF	ENG	Dara Akinlolu ^{U16}

=== Out on loan ===
Note: Flags indicate national team as defined under FIFA eligibility rules; some limited exceptions apply. Players may hold more than one non-FIFA nationality.

No.	Pos.	Nation	Player
72	GK	ENG	Tommy Goodger (Captain) (on loan at Aveley)

=== Youth Squad (U15/16s) ===
Note: Flags indicate national team as defined under FIFA eligibility rules; some limited exceptions apply. Players may hold more than one non-FIFA nationality.

No.	Pos.	Nation	Player
—	DF	ENG	Concilio Tonebi ^{U16}
—	MF	ENG	Jude Longman ^{U16}
—	MF	LCA	Abdulkareem Aman ^{U16}
—	FW	ENG	Emmanuel Famokun ^{U16}
—	MF	ENG	Isaac Allen ^{U16}
—	DF	ENG	Immanuel Adisa ^{U16}
—	MF	ENG	Kanyechukwuekele Okorie ^{U16}
—	MF	ENG	Ivanildo Batista ^{U16}
—	CF	ENG	Dara Akinlolu ^{U16}

== Honours ==
=== Reserve Team/Under-21's ===
London League (1896–1960)

- London Premier Division: 1909, 1912, 1913, 1915

Football Combination (1919–2012)

- The Combination: 1921, 1924, 1925, 1948, 1954, 1978, 1986
- The Combination Cup: 1954

Metropolitan League (1949–1971)

- Metropolitan League Cup: 1958
- Metropolitan Professional Cup: 1960, 1967, 1969
- Metropolitan Autumn Shield: 1968

Pro Development League (since 2012)

- Premier League 2 Division 2 U23:
  - Winners (1): 2020
  - Runners-up (1): 2017
- Premier League Cup U21: 2016

South East Counties League

- South-East County League: 1985, 1996, 1998
- South East Counties League Cup: 1967, 1969

=== Academy Team ===
- Premier Academy U19 League: 1999, 2000
- U18 Premier League South: 2023
- Premier League Cup U18: 2025
- Premier League Cup U17: 2026
- FA Youth Cup:
  - Winners (4): 1963, 1981, 1999, 2023
  - Runners-up (4): 1957, 1959, 1975, 1996
- National League Cup Final U21 Team Runners-up: 2026

== Notable players ==
Alongside West Ham's aforementioned representation in the 1966 FIFA World Cup final, the club also produced Clyde Best, Ade Coker and Clive Charles through their academy - with the trio making Football League history, by becoming the first three black players to start a game in the competition. Coker scored the second in the game against Tottenham Hotspur, on 1 April 1972, securing a 2–0 win for West Ham.

=== Internationally capped players (pre-2000) ===
Player	Position	West Ham appearances	West Ham goals	International caps	International goals	International representation	Club debut	Manager
Syd Puddefoot	DF	308	207	2	0	England	Age 18 vs. Norwich City, Southern League, 1 March 1913	Syd King
Jim Barrett	DF	553	70	1	0	England	Age 18 vs. Tottenham Hotspur, First Division, 28 March 1925	Syd King
Ken Brown	DF	474	4	1	0	England	Age 19 vs. Rotherham United, Second Division, 21 February 1953	Ted Fenton
Bobby Moore	DF	647	27	108	2	England	Age 17 vs. Manchester United, First Division, 8 September 1958	Ted Fenton
Geoff Hurst	ST	503	249	49	24	England	Age 17 vs. Fulham, Southern Professional Floodlit Cup, 15 December 1958	Ted Fenton
Martin Peters	MF	364	100	67	20	England	Age 18 vs. Cardiff City, First Division, 20 April 1962	Ron Greenwood
Trevor Brooking	MF	643	102	47	5	England	Age 18 vs. Burnley, First Division, 29 August 1967	Ron Greenwood
Frank Lampard Senior	DF	670	22	2	0	England	Age 19 vs. Manchester City, First Division, 18 November 1967	Ron Greenwood
Clyde Best	ST	221	58	2	1	Bermuda	Age 18 vs. Arsenal, First Division, 25 August 1969	Ron Greenwood
Ade Coker	ST	11	3	5	3	United States	Age 17 vs. Crystal Palace, First Division, 30 October 1971	Ron Greenwood
Tony Cottee	ST	336	146	7	0	England	Age 18 vs. Tottenham Hotspur, First Division, 1 January 1983	John Lyall
Paul Ince	MF	95	12	53	2	England	Age 19 vs. Chelsea, Full Members' Cup, 25 November 1986	John Lyall
Frank Lampard	MF	187	38	106	29	England	Age 17 vs. Coventry City, Premier League, 31 January 1996	Harry Redknapp
Rio Ferdinand	DF	158	2	81	3	England	Age 17 vs. Sheffield Wednesday, Premier League, 5 May 1996	Harry Redknapp
Joe Cole	MF	187	18	56	10	England	Age 17 vs. Swansea City, FA Cup, 2 January 1999	Harry Redknapp
Michael Carrick	MF	159	6	34	0	England	Age 17 vs. Jokerit, Intertoto Cup, 24 July 1999	Harry Redknapp

=== First team graduates since 2000 ===
Since the turn of the century, every permanent first team manager, apart from Julen Lopetegui, has enabled a player from West Ham's youth teams to represent the first team. The following table shows every player to have made at least one first team appearance in all competitions. Players highlighted in green are still contracted to West Ham.

Player	Position	West Ham appearances	West Ham goals	Current club	Born	International honours	Debut	Manager
Shaun Bryne	DF	3	0	Retired	(England) Taplow	(Republic of Ireland) Ireland U21	Age 18 vs. Newcastle United, Premier League, 3 January 2000	Harry Redknapp
Jermain Defoe	ST	105	41	Retired	(England) Beckton	England	Age 17 vs. Walsall, League Cup, 19 September 2000	Harry Redknapp
Grant McCann	MF	4	0	(England) Doncaster Rovers (manager)	(Northern Ireland) Belfast	Northern Ireland	Age 21 vs. Middlesbrough, Premier League, 19 May 2001	Glenn Roeder
Richard Garcia	FW	22	0	Retired	(Australia) Perth	Australia	Age 20 vs. Reading, League Cup, 11 September 2001	Glenn Roeder
Glen Johnson	DF	16	0	Retired	(England) Greenwich	England	Age 18 vs. Charlton Athletic, Premier League, 22 January 2003	Glenn Roeder
Anton Ferdinand	DF	163	5	Retired	(England) Peckham	England U21	Age 18 vs. Preston North End, Championship, 9 August 2003	Glenn Roeder
Chris Cohen	MF	22	0	Retired	(England) Norwich		Age 16 vs. Sunderland, Championship, 13 December 2003	Alan Pardew
Trent McClenahan	MF	3	0	Retired	(Australia) Chipping Norton	Australia U23	Age 19 vs. Crewe Alexandra, Championship, 21 August 2004	Alan Pardew
Mark Noble	MF	550	62	(England) West Ham United (sporting director)	(England) Canning Town	England U21	Age 17 vs. Southend United, League Cup, 24 August 2004	Alan Pardew
Elliott Ward	DF	21	0	(England) West Ham United (academy coach)	(England) Harrow		Age 19 vs. Southend United, League Cup, 24 August 2004	Alan Pardew
Hogan Ephraim	FW	1	0	Retired	(England) Archway	England U19	Age 17 vs. Sheffield Wednesday, League Cup, 20 September 2005	Alan Pardew
Tony Stokes	FW	1	0	Retired	(England) Bethnal Green		Age 18 vs. Sheffield Wednesday, League Cup, 20 September 2005	Alan Pardew
Kyel Reid	FW	9	1	Free agent	(England) Deptford		Age 18 vs. West Bromwich Albion, Premier League, 1 May 2006	Alan Pardew
Jack Collison	MF	121	14	Retired	(England) Watford	Wales	Age 19 vs. Arsenal, Premier League, 1 January 2008	Alan Curbishley
Freddie Sears	FW	58	3	(England) Brentwood Town	(England) Hornchurch	England U21	Age 18 vs. Blackburn Rovers, Premier League, 15 March 2008	Alan Curbishley
James Tomkins	DF	243	11	Retired	(England) Basildon	(United Kingdom) Great Britain	Age 18 vs. Everton, Premier League, 22 March 2008	Alan Curbishley
Zavon Hines	FW	31	3	(England) West Ham United (youth coach)	(Jamaica) Kingston	England U21	Age 19 vs. Macclesfield Town, League Cup, 27 August 2008	Alan Curbishley
Junior Stanislas	FW	47	8	Retired	(England) Kidbrooke	England U21	Age 19 vs. West Bromwich Albion, Premier League, 16 March 2009	Gianfranco Zola
Josh Payne	MF	3	0	(England) Beaconsfield Town	(England) Basingstoke	England C	Age 18 vs. Blackburn Rovers, Premier League, 21 March 2009	Gianfranco Zola
Bondz N'Gala	DF	1	0	Retired	(England) Forest Gate		Age 20 vs. Bolton Wanderers, League Cup, 22 September 2009	Gianfranco Zola
Anthony Edgar	MF	2	0	(England) Ashford United	(England) Newham		Age 19 vs. Arsenal, FA Cup, 3 January 2010	Gianfranco Zola
Jordan Spence	DF	10	0	Retired	(England) Woodford	England U21	Age 19 vs. Manchester City, FA Cup, 9 May 2010	Gianfranco Zola
Marek Štěch	GK	3	0	(Czech Republic) Ligmet Milín	(Czech Republic) Prague	Czech Republic	Age 20 vs. Oxford United, League Cup, 24 August 2010	Avram Grant
Callum McNaughton	DF	1	0	Retired	(England) Harlow		Age 19 vs. Aldershot Town, League Cup, 24 August 2011	Sam Allardyce
Dan Potts	DF	13	0	Free agent	(England) Barking	England U20	Age 17 vs. Barnsley, Championship, 17 December 2011	Sam Allardyce
Robert Hall	FW	7	0	Retired	(England) Aylesbury	England U19	Age 18 vs. Derby County, Championship, 31 December 2011	Sam Allardyce
Matthias Fanimo	MF	3	0	(England) Cheshunt	(England) Lambeth	England U18	Age 18 vs. Crewe Alexandra, League Cup, 28 August 2012	Sam Allardyce
George Moncur	MF	2	0	(England) Bedford Town	(England) Swindon	England U18	Age 19 vs. Crewe Alexandra, League Cup, 28 August 2012	Sam Allardyce
Dylan Tombides	ST	1	0		(Australia) Perth	Australia U23	Age 18 vs. Wigan Athletic, League Cup, 25 September 2012	Sam Allardyce
Elliot Lee	ST	7	1	(Wales) Wrexham	(England) Durham		Age 18 vs. Manchester United, FA Cup, 16 January 2013	Sam Allardyce
Leo Chambers	DF	3	0	Retired	(England) Brixton	England U19	Age 18 vs. Cheltenham Town, League Cup, 27 August 2013	Sam Allardyce
Reece Burke	DF	15	1	(England) Charlton Athletic	(England) Newham	England U20	Age 17 vs. Nottingham Forest, FA Cup, 5 January 2014	Sam Allardyce
Callum Driver	DF	1	0	Free agent	(England) Sidcup		Age 21 vs. Nottingham Forest, FA Cup, 5 January 2014	Sam Allardyce
Sebastian Lletget	MF	1	0	(United States) FC Dallas	(United States) San Francisco	United States	Age 20 vs. Nottingham Forest, FA Cup, 5 January 2014	Sam Allardyce
Blair Turgott	MF	1	0	(Greece) Chania	(England) Bromley	Jamaica	Age 19 vs. Nottingham Forest, FA Cup, 5 January 2014	Sam Allardyce
Josh Cullen	MF	10	0	(England) Burnley	(England) Westcliff-on-Sea	(Republic of Ireland) Ireland	Age 19 vs. Lusitanos, Europa League, 2 July 2015	Slaven Bilić
Reece Oxford	DF	17	0	Free agent	(England) Edmonton	England U20	Age 16 vs. Lusitanos, Europa League, 2 July 2015	Slaven Bilić
Lewis Page	DF	3	0	(England) St Albans City	(England) Enfield		Age 19 vs. Lusitanos, Europa League, 2 July 2015	Slaven Bilić
Djair Parfitt	ST	2	0	Free agent	(Bermuda) Hamilton	Bermuda	Age 18 vs. Lusitanos, Europa League, 2 July 2015	Slaven Bilić
Amos Nasha	MF	1	0	(England) Hayes & Yeading United	(England) Finchley		Age 19 vs. Lusitanos, Europa League, 9 July 2015	Slaven Bilić
Jordan Brown	FW	1	0	(England) Burnham	(England) Brent	England U17	Age 18 vs. Astra Giurgiu, Europa League, 6 August 2015	Slaven Bilić
Kyle Knoyle	DF	1	0	(England) Mansfield Town	(England) Newham	England U18	Age 18 vs. Astra Giurgiu, Europa League, 6 August 2015	Slaven Bilić
Marcus Browne	MF	1	0	(England) AFC Wimbledon	(England) Tower Hamlets		Age 18 vs. Astra Giurgiu, Europa League, 18 August 2016	Slaven Bilić
Declan Rice	MF	245	15	(England) Arsenal	(England) Kingston upon Thames	England	Age 18 vs. Burnley, Premier League, 21 May 2017	Slaven Bilić
Conor Coventry	MF	10	0	(England) Charlton Athletic	(England) Waltham Forest	(Republic of Ireland) Ireland U21	Age 18 vs. Macclesfield Town, League Cup, 26 August 2018	Manuel Pellegrini
Grady Diangana	MF	21	2	(Spain) Elche	(Democratic Republic of the Congo) Lubumbashi	(Democratic Republic of the Congo) DR Congo	Age 20 vs. Macclesfield Town, League Cup, 26 August 2018	Manuel Pellegrini
Joe Powell	MF	1	0	(England) Rotherham United	(England) Canning Town		Age 19 vs. Macclesfield Town, League Cup, 26 August 2018	Manuel Pellegrini
Ben Johnson	DF	109	2	(England) Ipswich Town	(England) Waltham Forest	England U21	Age 19 vs. Manchester City, Premier League, 27 February 2019	Manuel Pellegrini
Jeremy Ngakia	DF	5	0	(England) Watford	(England) Deptford		Age 19 vs. Liverpool, Premier League, 29 January 2020	David Moyes
Harrison Ashby	DF	7	0	(England) Newcastle United	(England) Milton Keynes	Scotland U21	Age 18 vs. Charlton Athletic, League Cup, 15 September 2020	David Moyes
Aji Alese	DF	2	0	(England) Sunderland	(England) Islington	England U20	Age 19 vs. Hull City, League Cup, 21 September 2020	David Moyes
Emmanuel Longelo	MF	2	0	(Scotland) Motherwell	(England) Barking		Age 19 vs. Hull City, League Cup, 21 September 2020	David Moyes
Mipo Odubeko	FW	2	0	(Republic of Ireland) Shelbourne	(Republic of Ireland) Dublin	(Republic of Ireland) Ireland U21	Age 18 vs. Stockport County, FA Cup, 11 January 2021	David Moyes
Nathan Trott	GK	1	0	(Wales) Cardiff City	Bermuda	England U20	Age 22 vs. Doncaster Rovers, FA Cup, 23 January 2021	David Moyes
Jamal Baptiste	DF	2	0	(England) Sheffield United	(England) Redbridge	England U19	Age 17 vs. Doncaster Rovers, FA Cup, 23 January 2021	David Moyes
Daniel Chesters	MF	2	0	(England) Wealdstone	(England) Hitchin		Age 19 vs. Genk, Europa League, 22 October 2021	David Moyes
Sonny Perkins	FW	3	0	(England) Wigan Athletic	(England) Waltham Forest	England U18	Age 17 vs. Rapid Wien, Europa League, 25 November 2021	David Moyes
Keenan Forson	MF	2	0	(England) Oldham Athletic	(England) Greenwich		Age 20 vs. Dinamo Zagreb, Europa League, 9 December 2021	David Moyes
Freddie Potts	MF	28	0	(Belgium) Club Brugge	(England) Barking		Age 18 vs. Dinamo Zagreb, Europa League, 9 December 2021	David Moyes
Oliver Scarles	DF	35	0	(England) West Ham United	(England) Bromley	England U20	Age 16 vs. FCSB, Europa Conference League, 3 November 2022	David Moyes
Divin Mubama	FW	18	1	(England) Southampton (on loan from Manchester City)	(England) Newham	England U21	Age 18 vs. FCSB, Europa Conference League, 3 November 2022	David Moyes
Kaelan Casey	DF	3	0	(Wales) West Ham United	(England) Brentwood	England U20	Age 18 vs. FCSB, Europa Conference League, 3 November 2022	David Moyes
Kamarai Swyer	MF	1	0	(England) Northampton Town	(England) Redbridge		Age 19 vs. FCSB, Europa Conference League, 3 November 2022	David Moyes
Levi Laing	DF	1	0	(Canada) Cavalry FC	(England) Kingston upon Thames	England U16	Age 19 vs. AEK Larnaca, Europa Conference League, 16 March 2023	David Moyes
George Earthy	MF	5	1	(England) Reading	(England) Havering	England U20	Age 19 vs. Freiburg, Europa League, 14 March 2024	David Moyes
Lewis Orford	MF	6	0	(England) West Ham United	(England) Havering	England U19	Age 18 vs. Crystal Palace, Premier League, 18 January 2025	Graham Potter
Ezra Mayers	MF	10	0	(England) West Ham United	(England) Wanstead	England U19	Age 18 vs. Brighton & Hove Albion, Premier League, 7 December 2025	Nuno Espírito Santo
Finlay Herrick	GK	2	0	(England) West Ham United	(England) Hatfield	England U20	Age 20 vs. Leeds United, FA Cup, 5 April 2026	Nuno Espírito Santo
Joshua Ajala	FW	2	2	(England) West Ham United	(England) Redbridge	England U20	Age 19 vs. Portsmouth, EFL Cup, 8 August 2026	Nuno Espírito Santo
Airidas Golambeckis	FW	1	0	(England) West Ham United	(England) East Ham	England U19	Age 18 vs. Southampton, EFL Cup, 25 August 2026	Nuno Espírito Santo

=== Other players ===
These players either trained at the academy but never played for West Ham first team or trained at multiple clubs in their youth. Only permanent spells are shown.

- Sol Campbell made his debut at Tottenham Hotspur in 1992, and became a regular England player in the late 1990s. In 2001, when his contract ran out, he joined Arsenal. Campbell was a regular player for club and country, and has won the Premier League twice and the FA Cup three times while with Arsenal. He was named in the official Euro 2004 All-Star squad by the UEFA technical group.

Career: 1992–2011; Tottenham Hotspur, Arsenal, Portsmouth, Notts County, Newcastle United
International caps: 73 caps, 1 goal (England)

- John Terry was schooled by both West Ham's and Chelsea's youth teams at different times. His debut for Chelsea was in 1998 and became captain of the side in the 2003/2004 season. The following season he helped Chelsea set a new record, the side having conceded only 15 goals in the entire league season. He was also voted PFA Players' Player of the Year in 2005.

Career: 1998–2018; Chelsea, Aston Villa
International caps: 78 caps, 8 goals (England)

- Kieran Richardson started with the West Ham youth academy but was picked up by Manchester United's youth academy as a teenager.

Career: 2002–2016; Manchester United, Sunderland, Fulham, Aston Villa, Cardiff City
International caps: 8 caps, 2 goals (England)

- Freddy Eastwood was previously a trainee at Southend United but moved to the West Ham Academy at age 15. He was unable to break into the first team and was released by then-manager Glenn Roeder. After starting out at non-League side Grays Athletic, he eventually worked his way up the league, signing for Championship sides Wolverhampton Wanderers and Coventry City. He represented Wales, qualifying through his grandmother.

Career: 2002–2015; Grays Athletic, Southend United, Wolverhampton Wanderers, Coventry City
International caps: 11 caps, 4 goals (Wales)

- Jlloyd Samuel joined West Ham from youth club Senrab, later moving to Charlton Athletic. Samuel later signed for Aston Villa, making 169 Premier League appearances at the club, as well as 71 league appearances for Bolton Wanderers, before playing domestic football in Iran.

Career: 2002–2015; Aston Villa, Bolton Wanderers, Esteghlal, Paykan, Egerton
International caps: 2 caps, 0 goals (Trinidad and Tobago)

- Fitz Hall was released by West Ham at the age of 15, initially playing in non-league and the lower leagues, before signing for Southampton in 2004. Hall later signed for Crystal Palace, captaining the club. Hall signed for Queens Park Rangers in 2008, making 85 league appearances for the club. Hall retired in 2014, following a two-year spell with Watford.

Career: 2000–2014; Barnet, Chesham United, Oldham Athletic, Southampton, Crystal Palace, Wigan Athletic, Queens Park Rangers, Watford

- Billy Mehmet was signed at the age of 8 years old and remained at the club until he was 19 years of age. During his time at West Ham, Mehmet was given his debut by Harry Redknapp at the age of 16 during a testimonial game. Mehmet was seen as the academies next promising graduate and was rewarded by being handed the captaincy of the reserve and youth team. Mehmet was released by the club at 19 years old by the then manager Glenn Roeder after the club was relegated. He then transferred to Dunfermline Athletic in the SPL, before moving onto St Mirren. After his time in Scotland, Mehmet later played in Turkey, Australia, Thailand, India and Singapore. Mehmet represented Northern Cyprus at the 2018 ConIFA World Football Cup.

Career: 2003–; Dunfermline Athletic, St Mirren, Gençlerbirliği, Samsunspor, Perth Glory, Bangkok Glass, Dempo, Kedah FA, Sarawak FA, Tampines Rovers, DPMM, Merit Alsancak Yeşilova
International caps: 5 caps, 4 goals (Northern Cyprus)

- Jimmy Bullard began his senior career in non-league, after playing in the youth set-up at West Ham, before re-signing for West Ham. After two years at the club, without making an appearance, Bullard signed for Peterborough United. Bullard won promotion to the Premier League with Wigan Athletic. Bullard spent a total of six seasons in the Premier League, with Wigan, Fulham and Hull City

Career: 1997–2012: Corinthian, Dartford, Gravesend & Northfleet, Peterborough United, Wigan Athletic, Fulham, Hull City, Ipswich Town, Milton Keynes Dons

- Kortney Hause spent eight years in West Ham's academy, moving to Birmingham City, before making his senior breakthrough at Wycombe Wanderers. In 2019, Hause made his debut in the Premier League for Aston Villa.

Career: 2012–: Wycombe Wanderers, Wolverhampton Wanderers, Aston Villa

==== English top division ====
- Alan Curbishley – England U21 International
- Alan Dickens – England U21 International
- Anton Ferdinand – England U21 International
- Bobby Barnes
- Lee Hodges
- Shaun Byrne – Rep of Ireland U21 International
- Simon Clarke
- Eamonn Dolan – Rep of Ireland U21 International
- Geoff Pike – FA Cup Winner
- George Parris
- Jimmy Bullard
- Kevin Keen
- Kyel Reid – England U17/U18/U19 International
- Mervyn Day – FA Cup Winner
- Paul Allen – FA Cup Winner
- Paul Brush – FA Cup Winner
- Steve Potts
- Stuart Slater – England U21/B International
- Danny Williamson
- Jlloyd Samuel – England U21 International
- Fitz Hall
- Liam Ridgewell – England U19/U21 International
- Emmanuel Omoyinmi
- Elliott Ward
- Everald La Ronde
- Greg Campbell
- Keith McPherson
- Matthew Rush
- Leon Britton
- Junior Stanislas – England U21 international
- Freddie Sears – England U19/U21 international
- James Tomkins – England U19/U21 international
- Grady Diangana – England U19/U21 international

==== English 2nd tier or below ====
- Billy Lansdowne
- Dale Banton
- Lee Boylan
- Scott Canham
- Nicky Morgan
- Paul Kelly
- Paul Marquis
- Phil Brignull
- Simon Livett
- Steve Banks
- Stevland Angus
- Trent McClenahan – Australia U20/U23 International
- Chris Cohen
- Michael Ferrante – Australia U17/U20 International
- Anwar Uddin
- Gary Alexander
- Jamie Victory
- Joe Widdowson
- Daryl McMahon
- Mark Smith
- Tony Stokes
- Terrell Forbes
- Stephen Purches
- Billy Mehmet
- Izzy Iriekpen
- Greg Pearson
- Ryan O'Neill
- David Partridge
- Lee Goodwin
- Olly Lee
- Anthony Edgar
- Cristian Montaño
- Steven Clark
- Ahmed Abdulla
- Jordan Brown
- Callum McNaughton
- Robert Hall
- Dan Potts
- Callum Driver
- Eoin Wearen
- George Moncur
- Matthias Fanimo
- Dylan Tombides
- Sam Cowler
- Blair Turgott
- Paul McCallum
- Dominic Vose
- Leo Chambers
- Pelly Ruddock Mpanzu
- Sebastian Lletget
- Reece Burke
- Jamie Harney
- Hogan Ephraim
- Zavon Hines
- Josh Payne
- Anthony Scully
- Jahmal Hector-Ingram
- George Dobson
- Moses Makasi
- Marcus Browne
- Djair Parfitt
- Alex Pike
- Lewis Page
