= Walton Casuals F.C. =

English football club

Coordinates: 51°23′58″N 0°24′44″W

Walton Casuals
- Full name: Walton Casuals Football Club
- Nickname: The Stags
- Founded: 1948
- Dissolved: 2022
- Ground: Elmbridge Sports Hub; Walton-on-Thames, Surrey
- Capacity: 2,500
- Website: www.waltoncasuals.co.uk
Home colours	Away colours

Walton Casuals Football Club was a football club based in Walton-on-Thames, Surrey. Founded in 1948, the club was affiliated to the Surrey County Football Association, and had been a part of the football pyramid since 1992.

The club joined the Surrey Intermediate League upon formation, and remained there until the league disbanded in 1965. A move to the Surrey Senior League lasted just two years before becoming founding members of the Suburban League. Walton Casuals won their first major honour in 1983 as champions of the Suburban League Southern Section. In 1992, the club turned semi-professional and entered the football pyramid by joining the Surrey Premier League. The Stags earned promotion to the Combined Counties Football League in 1995, and the Isthmian League 10 years later. After two years of groundsharing, the club moved into the Elmbridge Sports Hub – a £20 million sports complex development – for the 2017–18 season. In their first season at the new stadium, Walton secured a top six finish on goal difference and went on to win the play-offs.

Walton Casuals' most notable rivalry came with Combined Counties Premier Division club Walton & Hersham, due to their close proximity. The club also had a rivalry with Molesey, who play in the Isthmian League South Division. The two teams previously competed in an annual pre-season fixture for the Mick Burgess Memorial Trophy, but the competition was halted when Molesey earned promotion to the same league in 2015.

== History ==
=== 1946–1969: Formation and early origins ===
The earliest roots of Walton Casuals Football Club lead back to World War II. Following the conclusion of the war, a group of ex-servicemen returned to their council homes in the Walton-on-Thames area. They decided to form an "illegal" Sunday football team, White City FC, to play friendlies against other "illegal" teams throughout the 1946–47 and 1947–48 seasons.

In 1948, they decided to become a legitimate Saturday club, and Walton Casuals as they are currently known were founded. They became affiliated with the Surrey County Football Association and acquired the use of a pitch at Elm Grove Recreation Ground. The club started off in Division One of the Surrey Intermediate (Central) League and gained promotion to the Premier Division in 1952–53. Walton Casuals would go on to finish as runners-up on 3 occasions: 1954–55, 1956–57 and 1964–65. The Surrey Intermediate (Central) League disbanded in 1965 and the club moved into the League's Western Section for three seasons.

=== 1969–1992: Various leagues ===
In 1969, the Casuals joined the new Surrey Senior League and moved into its most notorious home at Franklyn Road Sports Field, later known as the Waterside Stadium. Two years later the club became founder members of the Suburban League, playing one season at Walton & Hersham's Stompond Lane ground before moving to Addlestone's Liberty Lane ground for eight seasons. The club then returned to Franklyn Road, where the Reserves had continued playing in the Surrey Combination League. The 1982–83 season saw the Casuals win their first major honour, becoming champions of the Suburban League Southern Section and setting a league record of going 23 games unbeaten under manager Kim Harris. The following year the Stags were runners-up behind Sutton United, and in the 1986–87 season reached the Surrey Premier Cup Final, only to lose to Croydon.

=== 1992–2002: Entering the football pyramid ===
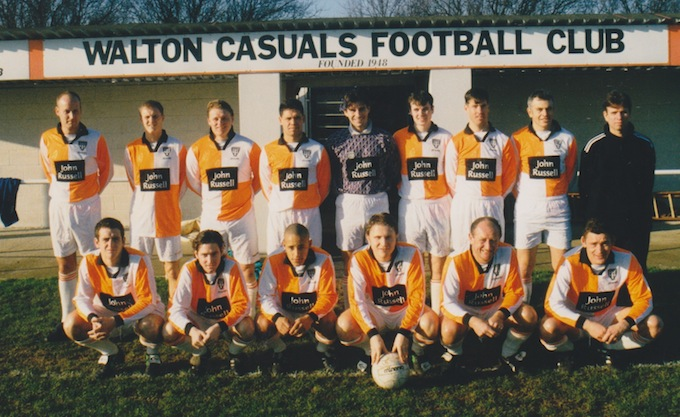
The 1997–98 Walton Casuals squad, managed by Mick Byrne.

Subsequent years saw the club slip into a steady decline, regularly finishing in the bottom two of the Suburban League. After 21 years of competing in the Suburban League, the club decided to switch to the Surrey Premier League in June 1992 to join the pyramid system. A year of consolidation paved the way for major changes at Franklyn Road the following summer, as Kim Harris was reappointed as manager after a successful spell at Hersham RBL and the club expanded into both Sunday and youth football. In 1993–94, the Casuals won the Surrey Premier League Challenge Cup, defeating Holmesdale after a replay, and in 1994–95 the club finished runners-up to Chobham in the league. They were also losing finalists to Vandyke in the Challenge Cup.

During the summer the club was promoted to the Combined Counties Football League, and the first four seasons proved a real struggle. Finishing bottom of the league in 1996–97, the club avoided relegation thanks to the Combined Counties League exercising its prerogative to maintain a minimum number of clubs in the Premier Division. With the help of local charities, the installation of floodlights at Franklyn Road was completed in February 1999 – a major hurdle overcome as far as ground requirements were concerned. The appointment of Mick Sullivan and Garry Clark as joint managers in the summer of 1999 brought about a dramatic improvement in results. As well as a best-ever finish of 5th in the league, the club won the League Cup in 2000, beating Viking Greenford 4–2 in the final. The following season was also a relatively successful one, with a placing of 7th in the table and another appearance in the League Cup final, beaten 3–0 by double-winners Cove.

=== 2002–2005: The Tony Gale takeover ===
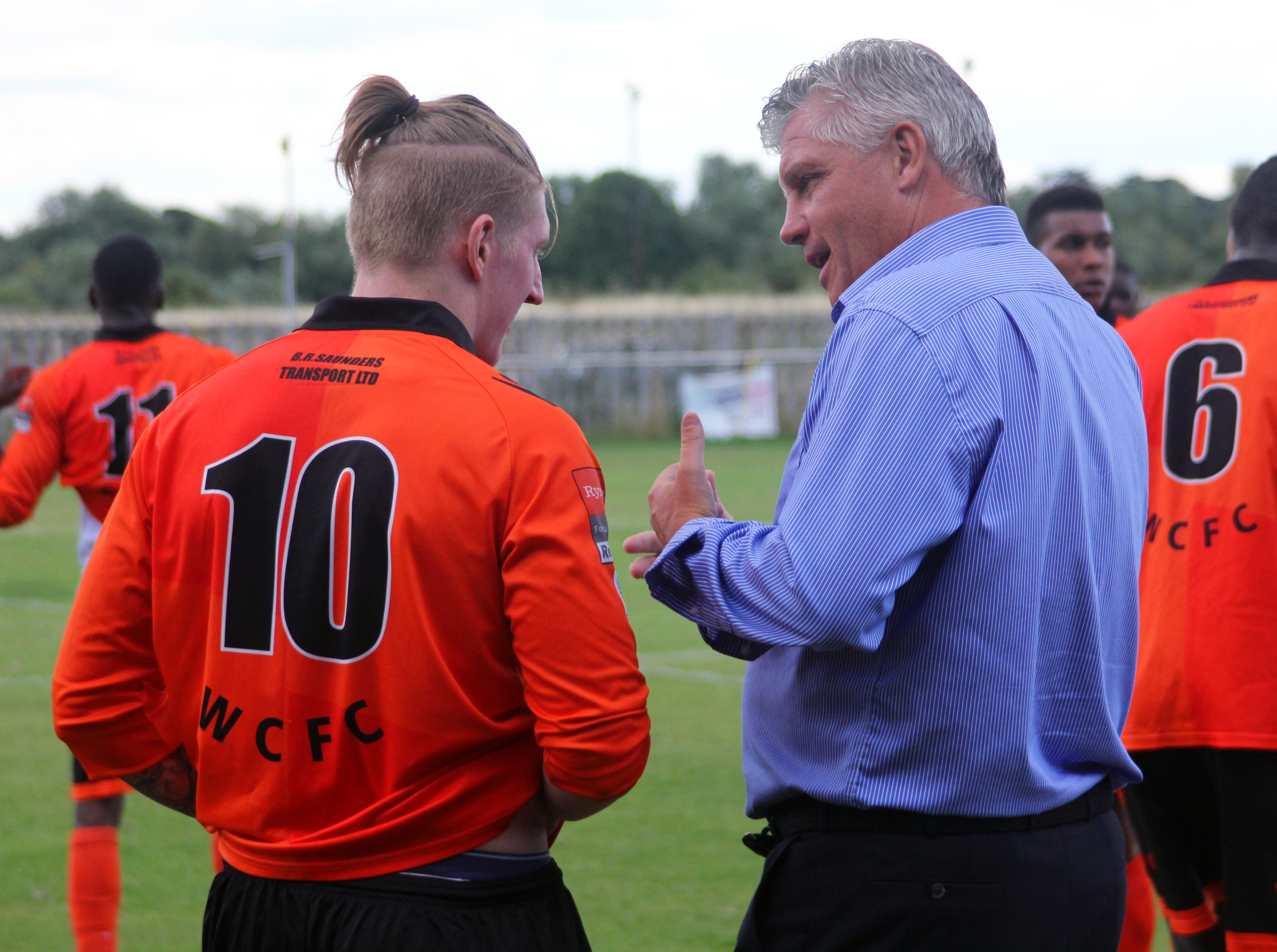
Tony Gale joined Walton Casuals as Director of Football in 2002.

Although 2002–03 proved a disappointment as the club finished in a lowly 18th spot, the appointment of Spencer Collins as manager in November 2002 sparked positive changes. As a team capable of much better things slowly began to take shape, ex-West Ham United player Tony Gale was installed as director of football. After more team-building in 2003–04, and a big jump up the table to finish in 7th spot, the club took the Combined Counties Football League by storm the year after, finishing 26 points clear at the top of the table. After initially failing an FA ground inspection, the club launched a successful appeal and achieved their dream of promotion to the Isthmian League Division One for 2005–06.

=== 2005–2014: Starting life in the Isthmian League ===
The club finished 15th in their maiden season in the Isthmian League, while regularly finishing in the bottom half in subsequent seasons. In 2009–10 the club achieved its best run in the FA Cup reaching the Third Qualifying Round, before losing to Staines Town. The club appointed Neil Shipperley manager in the summer of 2010 and finished in 12th place, their highest ever league finish at the time.

During early 2011 the club opened a new clubhouse and new changing facilities, with Mick Sullivan returning in October following the resignation of Shipperley. After being sacked a year later, Danny Carroll took over as manager. With a reprieve saving the Stags in the 2012–13 season, the club appointed ex-Kingstonian assistant manager Mark Hams as manager, along with his brother Neil as assistant. The duo rejuvenated the squad and guided Walton to their highest ever league finish of 9th. However, after nine defeats in as many league games, the Hams brothers left their positions at the club in September 2014.

=== 2014–2018: Established in the Isthmian League ===
Tony Gale and Anthony Gale were drafted in as caretaker managers, and immediately picked up the club's first win of the season, securing a 1–0 victory in a trip to Redhill. In November 2014, defenders Liam Collins and Simon Huckle were named as the new management team. Collins was able to secure the club's safety with a comfortable 18th-placed finish, but announced his intentions to step down from his management position at the end of the season to focus on his last few playing seasons. Assistant manager Huckle left the club to join Redhill.

Anthony Gale was announced as first team manager shortly before the start of the 2015–16 season and guided the club to 18th in his first full season in charge. The following season saw the Casuals equal their best ever FA Cup run, reaching the Third Qualifying Round before defeat to Westfields.

The club moved into the Elmbridge Sports Hub, an £18 million sports complex built on the site of the Waterside Stadium, for the 2017–18 season and enjoyed great success. Losing just two games at home throughout the campaign, Walton secured qualification for the play-offs in the final 15 minutes of the season with a dramatic conclusion at Ashford United. A semi-final tie at Cray Wanderers' Hayes Lane ended in a 5–2 victory for the Casuals, followed by a penalty shoot-out victory at Corinthian-Casuals after a goalless 120 minutes in the final. The win earned them a place in the seventh tier for the first time in the club's history.

=== 2018–2022: Southern League ===
Following a restructuring of the non-league pyramid by the FA, the club were moved across to the Southern Football League for the 2018–19 season. In their first campaign, the club avoided relegation on the final day of the season with a win away at Merthyr Town and other results going in their favour. The club also lifted the Southern Combination Challenge Cup for the first time in its history, with a 4–2 extra-time win against Sutton Common Rovers in the final.

In May 2019, Gale announced his resignation as manager. Later that month, he was replaced by Steve Conroy, who had most recently managed league rivals Kings Langley. The changes saw several senior players depart from the club.

On 9 June 2022, the Board of Directors announced that the club had folded after attempts to find new owners and investment had been unsuccessful.

== Colours and badge ==
The team's original crest was introduced in 1973 and contained the motto "Suprr Omnis Superbia", an incorrectly spelt Latin translation of the phrase "Pride above all". The shield shaped crest included a stag to remember the founding members of the club, many of whom would play football locally on Selwyn Green. Named after John Selwyn – a gamekeeper at Oatlands Palace – a brass in St Mary's Parish Church, Walton-on-Thames, depicts Selwyn killing a stag during a visit by Queen Elizabeth I in 1587. Minor modifications were made to the badge in 1992 when the club joined the football pyramid.

The current crest was designed in 2005 after the club's promotion to the Isthmian League. The crest kept many aspects of the original badge, including the stag, but was designed circular and without orange and black stripes in the background. The club's nickname of "The Stags" was officially acquired after winning the Combined Counties Football League in the 2004–05 season.

The club traditionally has an orange, black and white colourway. The first kit, used in 1948, was a set of white Royal Navy training shirts dyed royal blue to confirm to league rules, after the club incorrectly registered their kits to the league. Shorts and socks were provided by the colours and were a mixture of colours, as well as the goalkeeper's jersey.

The current home kit is an orange shirt with black shoulders and a white trim, black shorts and orange socks. The current away kit is a blue shirt with white trim, blue shorts and blue socks.

=== Kit sponsors ===
Period	Kit sponsor	Kit manufacturer
1992–1997	Ravencrown Limited	Unknown
1997–1998	Russell Financial Services	Unknown
1998–2000	Tallent's Cafe Bar	Unknown
2000–2004	Brown's Building Centre	Unknown
2004–2005	Brown's Building Centre	Nike
2006–2007	Antler Homes	Nike
2007–2008	Antler Homes	Puma
2008–2009	No Sponsor	Adidas
2009–2010	BR Saunders	Adidas
2010–2013	MKPS	Adidas
2013–2015	The Lily Foundation	Macron
2015–2016	No Sponsor	Nike
2016–2018	Landmark Groundworks	Nike
2018–2020	Elmbridge Heating & Plumbing	Nike
–2022	Outlaw Pro	Joma

== Stadium ==
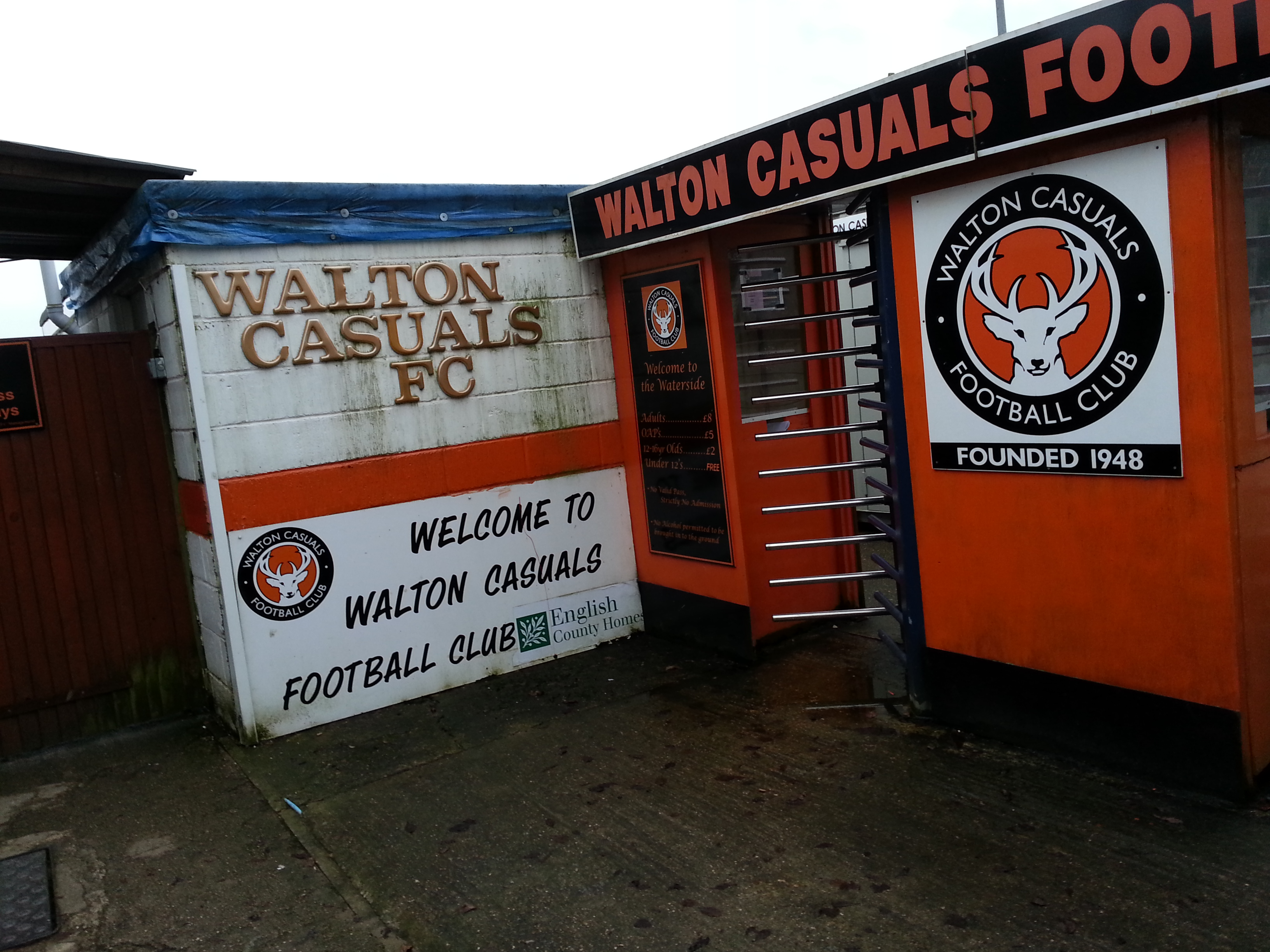
The entrance to the Waterside Stadium prior to developments.

Walton Casuals played their home games at the Elmbridge Sports Hub, Waterside Drive, Walton-on-Thames, Surrey, KT12 2JP.

The club moved into the stadium for the 2017–18 season following a two-year, £20 million redevelopment on the site of their former Waterside Stadium. The stadium was shared with Walton & Hersham, as well as the local athletics club with an eight-lane Olympic standard athletics track.

The club first played at Elm Grove Recreation Ground until 1969, before moving into Franklyn Road – the former name of the Waterside Stadium. In 1972, they groundshared with Walton & Hersham for the season at Stompond Lane, before spending eight years at Addlestone's Liberty Lane. The Stags then returned to Franklyn Road, although the Reserves had remained in Walton-on-Thames during the time away.

Once progress began on the plans for the Elmbridge Sports Hub, the club groundshared with Merstham at the Moatside for the 2015–16 season, and Whyteleafe at Church Road the following year. The club played three games at Cobham's Leg O'Mutton Field in a brief groundshare while construction at the Sports Hub was finalised. The team returned to the Elmbridge Sports Hub for their first game since the renovation on 9 September 2017.

== Affiliations ==
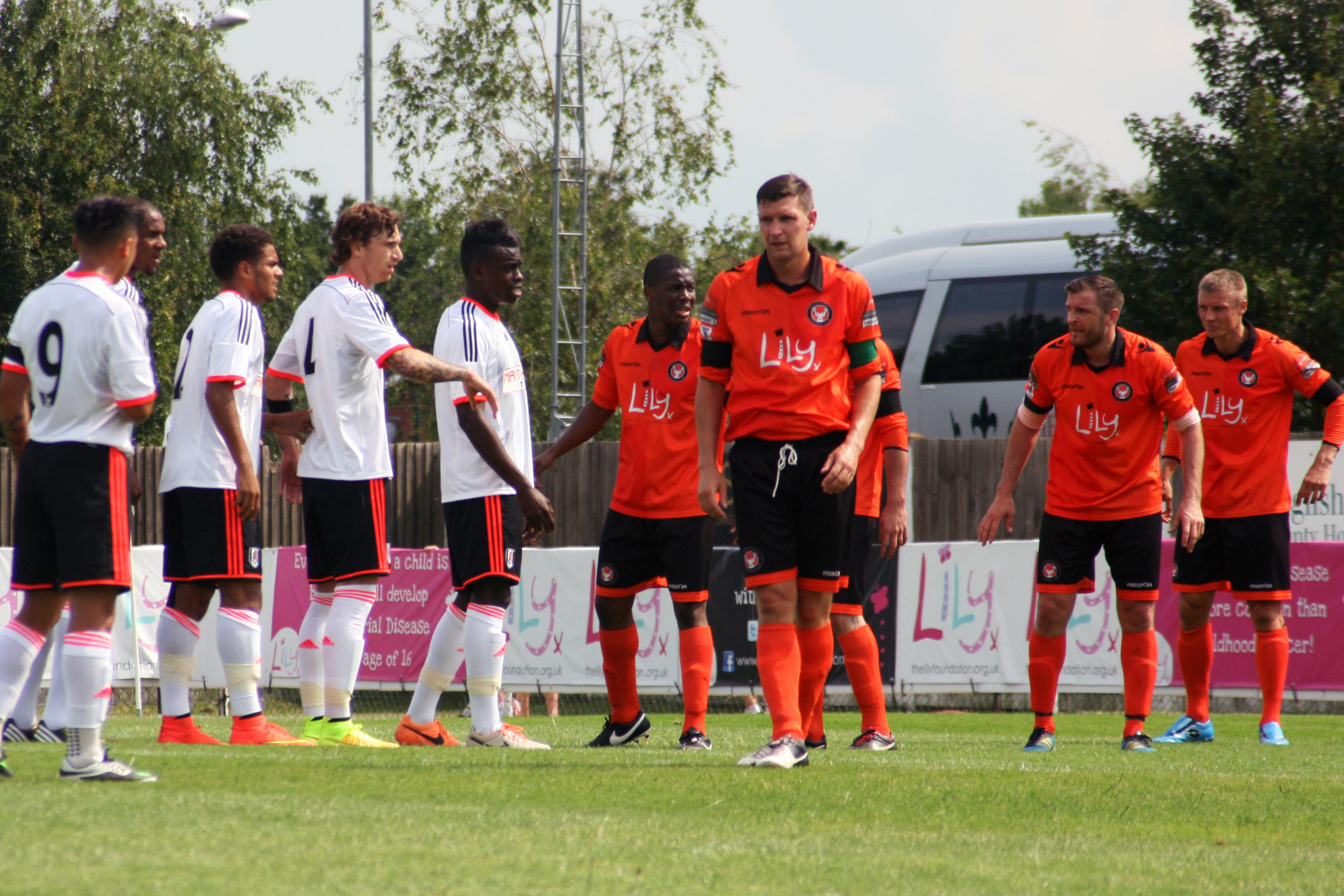
Walton Casuals lost 3–2 to Fulham U21s in the 2014 friendly.

Walton Casuals had an affiliation with Championship club Fulham, which began through former England assistant manager Ray Lewington. With his son, Craig, playing for the club at the time, he organised an annual friendly for the two clubs, where he was assistant manager at the time.

The inaugural game saw Fulham emerge as 3–1 victors in June 2008. The Lilywhites inflicted a 5–0 defeat on Walton Casuals in 2009, with Erik Nevland providing two of the goals. Philippines international Neil Etheridge and former Manchester United defender Chris Smalling both played in the game at the Waterside Stadium. Walton Casuals picked up their first win in 2011, with Dan Burn, Alexander Kacaniklic and Cauley Woodrow all playing as the hosts earned a 2–1 victory. Burn also represented Fulham during a 1–1 draw in August 2012, which included Marcus Bettinelli as an unused substitute. The 2014 friendly saw the visitors record a 3–2 victory, with Fernando Amorebieta and Luis Boa Morte included in the squad.

The fixture was not played ahead of the 2015–16, 2016–17, or 2017–18 seasons with Walton Casuals deeming the friendly unsuitable given their groundshares. Friendlies between the two clubs were not played ahead of the 2010–11 or 2013–14 seasons. The affiliation also sees Walton Casuals run an annual offer on Non-League Day for Fulham season ticket holders to gain free entry during the international break. Walton Casuals were named as a partner club of Fulham in September 2012. The club had a number of links to Fulham, most notably through chairman Tony Gale – who made 277 appearances for the club over a seven-year period and writes a column for the website.

== Honours ==
Walton Casuals' most successful season came in 2004–05, when they won the Combined Counties League Premier Division title. Recording 138 points and a goal difference of 99, the Stags suffered just four draws and four league defeats all season. In the same season, the club record their biggest ever victory with a 10–0 win over Chessington United. The club scored at least five times in a single match on six occasions.

The Casuals have also enjoyed success in the Mick Burgess Memorial Trophy, a pre-season fixture played annually with Molesey. The trophy competition was founded in 2008, following the death of former Walton Casuals and Molesey manager Mick Burgess in February 2008. Walton Casuals have dominated in the competition, winning five of the seven games played. The 2015–16 season was the first year the fixture was not played since its creation, due to Molesey earning promotion to the Isthmian League.

Honour	Winners	Runners Up
Isthmian League South Division Play-offs	2017–18	–
Combined Counties League Premier Division	2004–05	–
Combined Counties League Premier Challenge Cup	1999–00	2000–01
Suburban League Southern Section	1982–83	1983–84
Suburban League Premier B	2012–13	–
Surrey County Premier League	–	1994–95
Surrey County Premier League Challenge Cup	1994–95, 1995–96	–
Surrey County Premier Cup	2012–13	1986–87
Mick Burgess Memorial Trophy	2008–09, 2010–11, 2011–12, 2012–13, 2014–15	2009–10, 2013–14
Southern Combination Challenge Cup	2018–19	–

== Records ==
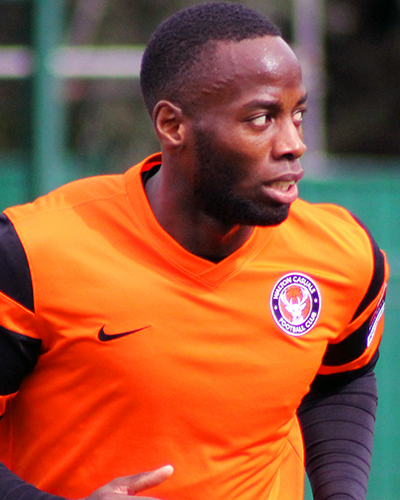
Gabriel Odunaike was named top scorer three times.

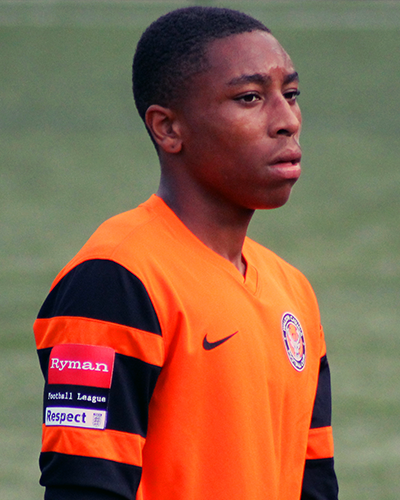
Luke Holness scored in the FA Cup aged 17 years, 364 days.

Records for the club began when the club joined the football pyramid in 1992.

=== Matches ===
- First competitive match: Burpham 7–1 Walton Casuals, Surrey County Premier League, 29 August 1992
- First FA Cup match: Ashford Town 4–1 Walton Casuals, First Qualifying Round, 2 September 2000
- First FA Vase match: Walton Casuals 1–3 Pagham, First Qualifying Round, 7 September 1996
- First FA Trophy match: Walton Casuals 0–1 Harlow Town, First Qualifying Round, 15 October 2005
- First Surrey Senior Cup match: Walton Casuals 2–4 Raynes Park Vale, first round, 1 November 1997
- First Southern Combination Challenge Cup match: Staines Town 2–1 Walton Casuals, first round, 11 November 1997
- Record attendance: 1,748 (v AFC Wimbledon, Combined Counties Premier Division, 12 April 2004)

=== Results ===
- Record win: 11–0 v Bagshot, Southern Combination Challenge Cup, 29 January 2019
- Record defeat:
  - 0–7 v Faversham Town, Isthmian League Division One South, 9 April 2016
  - 0–7 v Faversham Town, Isthmian League Division One South, 8 December 2012
  - 0–7 v Chipstead, Combined Counties Premier Division, 9 November 2002
  - 0–7 v Redhill, Surrey Senior Cup First Round, 8 December 1998
- Highest scoring game: 6–6 vs Merstham, Isthmian League Division One South, 10 November 2012

=== Appearances ===
- Most club appearances: Lawrence Ennis – 288
- Youngest player: Calogero Scannella – 16 years, 11 days (v Herne Bay, Isthmian League Division One South, 2 April 2016)
- Oldest player: Norman Rudd – 47 years, 351 days (v Merstham, Combined Counties Football League, 23 September 1995)
- Most consecutive appearances: Jordan Cheadle – 76 (16 January 2016 to 22 April 2017)
- Most appearances in a season: Harry Mills – 59 (2018–19)

=== Goals ===
- Most club goals: Mark Postins – 111
- Most goals in consecutive matches – Paul Mills – 10 games (24 goals, 1 October 1994 to 3 December 1994)
- Most goals in a season: Paul Mills – 47 (1994–95)
- Most goals scored in a match: Paul Mills – 5 (v Hinchley Wood, Combined Counties Challenge Cup, 19 February 1994)
- Most hat-tricks: Paul Mills – 13 (11 December 1993 to 4 April 1998)
- Most top scorer awards: Gabriel Odunaike – 4 (2013–14, 2014–15, 2015–16, 2016–17)
- Oldest FA Cup goalscorer: Michael Barima – 32 years, 24 days (v Pagham, preliminary round, 29 August 2009)
- Youngest FA Cup goalscorer: Luke Holness – 17 years, 364 days (v Chatham Town, preliminary round, 20 August 2016)

=== Competitions ===
- Southern League best performance: 17th – Premier Division South, 2018–19
- Isthmian League best performance: 6th – South Division, 2017–18
- Isthmian League Cup best performance: Semi-finals, 2007–08
- FA Cup best performance: Third qualifying round, 2009–10, 2016–17
- FA Trophy best performance: Second qualifying round, 2006–07
- FA Vase best performance: First round, 1999–00, 2000–01, 2002–03
- Surrey Senior Cup best performance: Semi-finals, 2018–19
- Southern Combination Challenge Cup best performance: Winners, 2018–19

=== Most competitive appearances ===
As of 28 July 2019

The following table shows players who have made at least 100 competitive (league and cup) appearances for the club in descending order. Records begin in 1992 when the club joined the football pyramid.

- Seasons marked with * indicate the player had multiple spells at the club
- Players in bold indicate they currently feature at the club

Seasons	Player	Apps
1997–2005*	Lawrence Ennis	288
2001–2011*	Anthony Gale	283
2007–2013	Craig Lewington	279
2002–2010	Michael Cayford	248
1994–2004*	Mark Postins	236
1997–2019*	Scott Harris	234
2002–2007	Craig Carley	223
1993–2004*	Graeme Cooksley	209
2004–2009	John Ambridge	205
1994–1999	Dave Francis	196
1999–2004	Emerson Barrs-James	184
2003–2008	Greg Ball	179
1992–1998	Richard Murray	164
1993–1999	Gary Millar	164
1994–2003*	Michael Kennedy	162
2013–2017	Gabriel Odunaike	160

Seasons	Player	Apps
2013–2016	Scott Day	152
2016–2019	Denzel Gerrar	149
1999–2004	Dave D'Rozario	148
1992–1997	Graham Elliott	148
1999–2016*	Liam Collins	146
1999–2003	Mark Hunter	146
2005–2012*	Kristian Webb	145
1992–1998	Steve Crozier	143
2000–2006	Carlo Castronovo	142
2000–2004	Mark Osikoya	140
2003–2007	James Pearson	124
2003–2007	Danny Andrews	124
1993–1999	Paul Mills	123
1992–1998	Salvatore Costanzo	122
1997–2004	Paul Roberts	122
2006–2019	Max Hustwick*	121

Seasons	Player	Apps
2008–2012	Michael Barima	121
2006–2015*	Sol Patterson-Bohner	118
1993–2001*	Danny Nicholson	116
2011–2017	Jordan Cheadle	115
2017–2019	Harry Mills	113
1999–2002	Jamie Reive	113
2003–2007	Luke Dowling	109
2001–2008*	Grant Keywood	108
1994–1999	Greg Tree	104
1992–2001*	Spencer Collins	104
2013–2017*	Max Fitzgerald	103
2004–2008	James Crowe	103
1995–2000	Richard Crow-Mains	102
2012–2016*	Malachi Hudson	101

=== Most competitive goals ===
As of 30 December 2019

The following table shows players who have scored at least 25 competitive (league and cup) goals for the club in descending order. Records begin in 1992 when the club joined the football pyramid.

- Seasons marked with * indicate the player had multiple spells at the club
- Players in bold indicate they currently feature at the club

Seasons	Player	Goals
1993–1999	Paul Mills	111
1999–2004	Emerson Barrs-James	96
1994–2004*	Mark Postins	88
2013–2017	Gabriel Odunaike	79
2003–2008	Greg Ball	74
2002–2007	Craig Carley	72

Seasons	Player	Goals
2001–2011*	Anthony Gale	51
1999–2004	Dave D'Rozario	44
1994–1999	Greg Tree	43
2017–2018	Josh Kelly	40
2018–2019	James Ewington	43
2013–2016	Scott Day	39

Seasons	Player	Goals
2011–2017*	Jordan Cheadle	32
1999–2003	Mark Hunter	31
1999–2001	Graham Morrow	30
2012–2016*	Malachi Hudson	27
2015–2018*	Jack Sammoutis	27

== Season-by-season record ==
Season	Division	Position	Top Scorer	Goals
1992–93	Surrey County Premier League	12	Leo Valentin	14
1993–94	Surrey County Premier League	5	Paul Mills	36
1994–95	Surrey County Premier League	2	Paul Mills	47
1995–96	Combined Counties Football League	20	Greg Tree	14
1996–97	Combined Counties Football League	20	Mark Postins	16
1997–98	Combined Counties Football League	18	Paul Mills	15
1998–99	Combined Counties Football League	17	Mark Postins	13
1999–00	Combined Counties Football League	5	Mark Postins	27
2000–01	Combined Counties Football League	7	Emerson Barrs-James	18
2001–02	Combined Counties Football League	9	Emerson Barrs-James	36
2002–03	Combined Counties Football League	18	Emerson Barrs-James	18
2003–04	Combined Counties Football League Premier Division	7	Greg Ball	30
2004–05	Combined Counties Football League Premier Division	1	Craig Carley	29
2005–06	Isthmian League Division One	15	Greg Ball	19
2006–07	Isthmian League Division One South	17	Craig Carley	21
2007–08	Isthmian League Division One South	16	Nana Badu	15
2008–09	Isthmian League Division One South	17	Paul Armstrong, Daniel Platel, Matt Weston	5
2009–10	Isthmian League Division One South	21	Martin Grant	19
2010–11	Isthmian League Division One South	12	Danny Buckle	14
2011–12	Isthmian League Division One South	15	Charlie Ide	7
2012–13	Isthmian League Division One South	22	Sol Patterson-Bohner, Mu Maan	9
2013–14	Isthmian League Division One South	9	Gabriel Odunaike	22
2014–15	Isthmian League Division One South	18	Gabriel Odunaike	15
2015–16	Isthmian League Division One South	16	Gabriel Odunaike, Scott Day	16
2016–17	Isthmian League Division One South	13	Gabriel Odunaike	27
2017–18	Isthmian League South Division	6	Josh Kelly	40
2018–19	Southern League Premier Division	17	James Ewington	39
2019–20	Southern League Premier Division	Null and Void Due to COVID-19		
2020–21	Southern League Premier Division	Null and Void Due to COVID-19		
2021–22	Southern League Premier Division	11		

== Recent managers ==
=== Managerial statistics ===
As of 30 December 2019

These statistics incorporate results for league matches and results in cup competitions (including the Isthmian League Cup, Surrey Senior Cup and Southern Combination Challenge Cup) as well as results in the FA Trophy and the FA Cup.

Caretaker managers are shown in italics.

Name	From	Until	Games	Won	Drawn	Lost	Win %
(England) Steve Conroy	26 May 2019	Present	29	9	3	17	31.04
(England) Anthony Gale	1 July 2015	6 May 2019	229	104	37	88	45.42
(England) Liam Collins*	2 November 2014	1 May 2015	34	15	3	16	44.12
(England) Anthony Gale	20 September 2014	1 November 2014	12	5	3	4	41.67
(England) Mark Hams	12 June 2013	19 September 2014	65	24	6	35	36.92
(England) Tony Gale	21 March 2013	1 May 2013	8	1	2	5	12.50
(England) Danny Carroll**	15 November 2012	20 March 2013	22	5	5	12	22.73
(England) Mick Sullivan	20 October 2011	13 November 2012	51	18	5	28	35.29
(England) Neil Shipperley	1 July 2010	17 October 2011	66	21	13	32	31.82
(England) Spencer Collins***	16 November 2008	3 May 2010	72	18	13	41	25.00
(England) John Morris	15 May 2008	15 November 2008	21	5	5	11	23.81
(England) Luke Dowling	19 September 2007	26 April 2008	44	16	13	15	36.36
(England) Kim Harris	27 November 2005	16 September 2007	89	27	22	40	30.34
(England) Spencer Collins	12 November 2002	26 November 2005	193	98	31	64	50.78

* Liam Collins took the role as a player-manager, but stepped down to focus on his playing career.

** Danny Carroll's statistics include two games as caretaker manager before his permanent appointment.

*** Spencer Collins' statistics include ten games as caretaker manager before his permanent appointment.

=== Previous managers ===
Name	From	Until	Notes
(Republic of Ireland) Ray Noad	September 2001	November 2002	
(England) Mick Sullivan	July 1999	September 2001	
(England) Garry Clark	July 1999	September 2001	
(Republic of Ireland) Ray Noad	March 1999	July 1999	
(England) David Grindrod	February 1999	March 1999	Caretaker manager
(England) Gary Millar	September 1997	February 1999	
(England) Mickie Byrne	March 1997	September 1999	Initially as caretaker manager
(England) Kim Harris	July 1993	March 1997	
(England) Chris McLaren	March 1993	July 1993	Caretaker manager
(England) Dennis Hill	September 1992	March 1993	
(England) Graham Robinson	July 1992	September 1992	

== See also ==
- List of Walton Casuals F.C. seasons
- List of Walton Casuals F.C. players
- List of Walton Casuals F.C. managers
