= Tony Carr (footballer, born 1950) =

English football coach

Tony Carr MBE
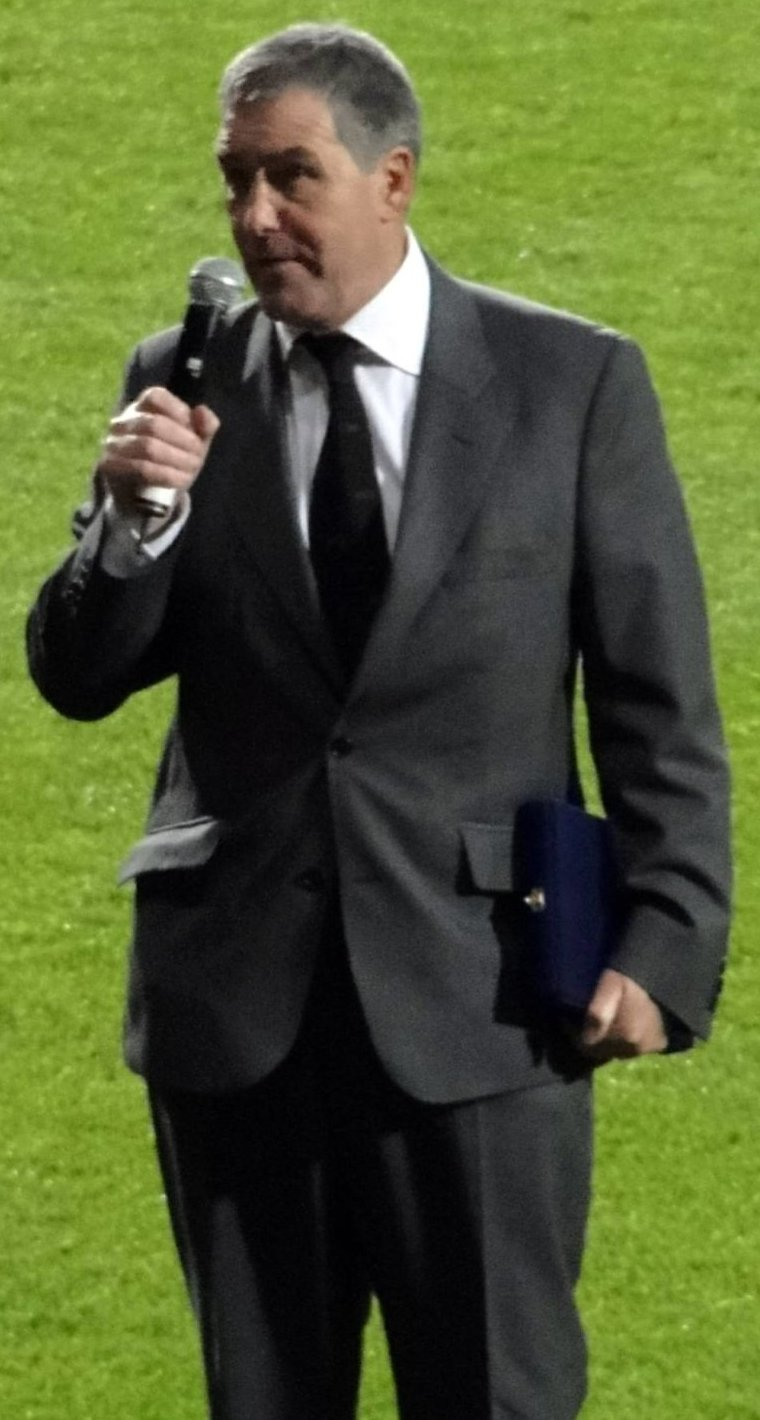

Personal information
- Full name: Anthony Carr
- Date of birth: 5 September 1950 (age 76)
- Place of birth: Bow, London, England
- Position: Centre-forward

Youth career
- 1966–1969: West Ham United

Senior career*
Years	Team	Apps	(Gls)
1969–1971	West Ham United	0	(0)
1971–1972	Barnet	13	(1)
- * Club domestic league appearances and goals

Anthony Carr MBE (born 5 September 1950) is an English sports coach and former Director of Youth Development at the West Ham United football club's youth academy and is recognised as one of the most influential figures in English football. A former graduate of the academy himself, whose footballing career was cut short by injury, he joined the club's staff as a youth coach in 1973. Since then in his tenure as director, as of 2010, Carr is credited with producing talent which has earned an estimated £80 million in transfer fees for the club, while the 23-man England squad for the 2010 FIFA World Cup contained no less than seven players trained by Carr – Rio Ferdinand, Frank Lampard, Joe Cole, Michael Carrick, Jermain Defoe, Glen Johnson and John Terry.

== Early life and playing career ==
Carr was born in Bow, East London and was a West Ham youth player, joining in 1966 as a trainee striker, and cleaning the boots of the famous World Cup players Geoff Hurst, Bobby Moore and Martin Peters. He had three seasons as a youth team player and two as a professional player for West Ham, reaching reserve team level. He played for one season at Barnet before breaking his leg which put him out of the game for over 18 months. During this time he qualified as a PE instructor. He eventually stopped playing due to a career-threatening injury, although he has since admitted that he did not have the ability to play at the highest level.

== As West Ham academy director ==
In 1973, Carr was appointed as the Director of Youth Development at West Ham. Since then he has overseen the development of many talented players at what has become known within the game as The Academy of Football. As a developer of young talent he may be among the most successful and influential coaches in the United Kingdom, but he modestly argues differently: "No way is it all down to me. It's very difficult to say why we've been so successful in youth terms; I suppose it's down to a number of factors but, most importantly, our recruitment area of east London and Essex is really fertile." (Daily Telegraph interview, 14 June 2004)

He was aided in his task by Chief Scout Jimmy Hampson, who is considered among the best talent-spotters in the United Kingdom.

For over thirty years Carr has arguably been the single most important member of West Ham's coaching staff. Since his original appointment in 1973, the club have had ten managers of the first team squad (not including Sir Trevor Brooking who had two stints as caretaker manager) but Tony Carr remains at his post developing the players of the future. Carr has collaborated with Better Football Coaching since 2007 to develop 'Smart Sessions', coaching advice for grassroots coaches. He has also participated in coaching seminars in the United States.

On 16 March 2009 it was announced that in recognition of Carr's 36 years of service to West Ham he had been awarded a testimonial year. Scheduled throughout the year are a number of golf tournaments and dinners. A testimonial game featuring a West Ham first team against a team of former academy players was played on 5 May 2010 at the Boleyn Ground.

Carr was appointed Member of the Order of the British Empire (MBE) in the 2010 Birthday Honours for services to football.

He was replaced as West Ham's academy director in 2014 by Terry Westley after which time he took an ambassadorial role at West Ham. In 2016, he was offered a continuation of this role but with reduced terms and in a part-time capacity which he declined. He left the club after 43 years service.

== Personal life ==
Carr has two sons and a daughter. He lives near Brentwood, Essex.

== Selected works ==
Tony Carr, A lifetime in football at West Ham United (London, 2022) ISBN 9781785787607
