= Oliver Allen (footballer) =

English footballer

Personal information
- Full name: Oliver Thomas Allen
- Date of birth: 7 September 1986 (age 40)
- Place of birth: Brentwood, England
- Height: 5 ft 9 in (1.75 m)
- Position: Forward

Youth career
- West Ham United
- Tottenham Hotspur

Senior career*
| Years | Team | Apps | (Gls) |
| 2005–2007 | Birmingham City | 0 | (0) |
| 2007 | Barnet | 14 | (4) |
| 2007–2008 | Stevenage Borough | 13 | (1) |
| 2008 | → Crawley Town (loan) | 2 | (2) |
| 2009 | Thurrock | 1 | (0) |
| 2009 | Billericay Town | | |
- * Club domestic league appearances and goals as of 23:53, 5 April 2009 (UTC)

Oliver Thomas Allen (born 7 September 1986) is an English former professional footballer who played as a striker in the Football League for Barnet. His father Clive played for Tottenham Hotspur in the 1980s.

== Playing career ==
Allen is a former West Ham United trainee who also played for Tottenham Hotspur at youth level. He moved to Birmingham City during 2005. He scored 13 goals in 18 games for Birmingham's reserves, but never played for the first team, moving to Barnet on a free transfer in January 2007. He had some success at Barnet, scoring four goals in four consecutive games in February, but did not add to that tally, and was released by the club in May 2007.

After impressing on trial – scoring a goal against Tottenham Hotspur in a friendly – Allen signed a two-year contract with Conference National side Stevenage Borough. In February 2008, he went on loan to Crawley Town. At the end of the 2007–08 season he retired from football due to a persistent knee injury and the remainder of his contract was cancelled by Stevenage.

However, in January 2009, he returned to football with Conference South side Thurrock, but made only one appearance from the substitutes bench, against Hampton & Richmond Borough, before leaving the club because of injury.

On transfer deadline day in March 2009, Allen joined Billericay Town.
