= List of Walton Casuals F.C. seasons =

This is a list of seasons played by Walton Casuals Football Club in English football from the club entering semi-professional football in 1992 to the present day. It details the club's achievements in major competitions.

== Season list ==
Season	League									FA Cup	Other competitions		Top scorer		References
Season	Division	P	W	D	L	F	A	Pts	Pos	FA Cup	Other competitions		Name	Goal	References
1992–93	Surrey County Premier League	30	10	3	17	48	74	33	12th	Did Not Participate	Surrey Challenge Cup	SF	Leo Valentin	14	
1992–93	Surrey County Premier League	30	10	3	17	48	74	33	12th	Did Not Participate	SPC	R1	Leo Valentin	14	
1992–93	Surrey County Premier League	30	10	3	17	48	74	33	12th	Did Not Participate	RPC	R1	Leo Valentin	14	
1993–94	Surrey County Premier League	24	11	3	10	42	46	36	5th	Did Not Participate	Surrey Challenge Cup	WIN	Paul Mills	36	
1993–94	Surrey County Premier League	24	11	3	10	42	46	36	5th	Did Not Participate	SPC	R3	Paul Mills	36	
1993–94	Surrey County Premier League	24	11	3	10	42	46	36	5th	Did Not Participate	RPC	SF	Paul Mills	36	
1994–95	Surrey County Premier League	32	21	8	3	87	35	71	2nd	Did Not Participate	Surrey Challenge Cup	RUN	Paul Mills	47	
1994–95	Surrey County Premier League	32	21	8	3	87	35	71	2nd	Did Not Participate	SPC	R3	Paul Mills	47	
1995–96	Combined Counties Football League	42	10	8	24	46	67	38	20th	Did Not Participate	Counties Challenge Cup	QF	Greg Tree	14	
1995–96	Combined Counties Football League	42	10	8	24	46	67	38	20th	Did Not Participate	Surrey Senior Cup	R1	Greg Tree	14	
1996–97	Combined Counties Football League	38	9	4	25	477	90	31	20th	Did Not Participate	FA Vase	QR1	Mark Postins	16	
1996–97	Combined Counties Football League	38	9	4	25	477	90	31	20th	Did Not Participate	Counties Challenge Cup	R1	Mark Postins	16	
1996–97	Combined Counties Football League	38	9	4	25	477	90	31	20th	Did Not Participate	Surrey Senior Cup	R1	Mark Postins	16	
1997–98	Combined Counties Football League	38	8	10	20	45	84	34	18th	Did Not Participate	FA Vase	DNP	Paul Mills	15	
1997–98	Combined Counties Football League	38	8	10	20	45	84	34	18th	Did Not Participate	Counties Challenge Cup	R3	Paul Mills	15	
1997–98	Combined Counties Football League	38	8	10	20	45	84	34	18th	Did Not Participate	Surrey Senior Cup	R1	Paul Mills	15	
1997–98	Combined Counties Football League	38	8	10	20	45	84	34	18th	Did Not Participate	Southern Combination Cup	R1	Paul Mills	15	
1998–99	Combined Counties Football League	40	9	6	25	60	88	33	17th	Did Not Participate	FA Vase	DNP	Mark Postins	13	
1998–99	Combined Counties Football League	40	9	6	25	60	88	33	17th	Did Not Participate	Counties Challenge Cup	R1	Mark Postins	13	
1998–99	Combined Counties Football League	40	9	6	25	60	88	33	17th	Did Not Participate	Surrey Senior Cup	R1	Mark Postins	13	
1998–99	Combined Counties Football League	40	9	6	25	60	88	33	17th	Did Not Participate	Southern Combination Cup	SF	Mark Postins	13	
1999–00	Combined Counties Football League	40	20	10	10	80	64	73	5th	Did Not Participate	FA Vase	R1	Mark Postins	27	
1999–00	Combined Counties Football League	40	20	10	10	80	64	73	5th	Did Not Participate	Counties Challenge Cup	WIN	Mark Postins	27	
1999–00	Combined Counties Football League	40	20	10	10	80	64	73	5th	Did Not Participate	Surrey Senior Cup	QR2	Mark Postins	27	
1999–00	Combined Counties Football League	40	20	10	10	80	64	73	5th	Did Not Participate	Southern Combination Cup	QF	Mark Postins	27	
2000–01	Combined Counties Football League	40	19	5	16	73	68	62	7th	Preliminary Round	FA Vase	R1	Emerson Barrs-James	18	
2000–01	Combined Counties Football League	40	19	5	16	73	68	62	7th	Preliminary Round	Counties Challenge Cup	RUN	Emerson Barrs-James	18	
2000–01	Combined Counties Football League	40	19	5	16	73	68	62	7th	Preliminary Round	Surrey Senior Cup	QR1	Emerson Barrs-James	18	
2000–01	Combined Counties Football League	40	19	5	16	73	68	62	7th	Preliminary Round	Southern Combination Cup	R2	Emerson Barrs-James	18	
2001–02	Combined Counties Football League	42	20	7	15	88	63	67	9th	Preliminary Round	FA Vase	QR1	Emerson Barrs-James	36	
2001–02	Combined Counties Football League	42	20	7	15	88	63	67	9th	Preliminary Round	Counties Challenge Cup	R1	Emerson Barrs-James	36	
2001–02	Combined Counties Football League	42	20	7	15	88	63	67	9th	Preliminary Round	Surrey Senior Cup	R3	Emerson Barrs-James	36	
2001–02	Combined Counties Football League	42	20	7	15	88	63	67	9th	Preliminary Round	Southern Combination Cup	R2	Emerson Barrs-James	36	
2002–03	Combined Counties Football League	46	12	10	24	60	95	46	18th	Extra Preliminary Round	FA Vase	R1	Emerson Barrs-James	18	
2002–03	Combined Counties Football League	46	12	10	24	60	95	46	18th	Extra Preliminary Round	Counties Challenge Cup	R1	Emerson Barrs-James	18	
2002–03	Combined Counties Football League	46	12	10	24	60	95	46	18th	Extra Preliminary Round	Surrey Senior Cup	R3	Emerson Barrs-James	18	
2002–03	Combined Counties Football League	46	12	10	24	60	95	46	18th	Extra Preliminary Round	Southern Combination Cup	R1	Emerson Barrs-James	18	
2003–04	Combined Counties Premier Division	46	25	9	12	112	64	84	7th	First Qualifying Round	FA Vase	QR2	Greg Ball	30	
2003–04	Combined Counties Premier Division	46	25	9	12	112	64	84	7th	First Qualifying Round	Counties Challenge Cup	R2	Greg Ball	30	
2003–04	Combined Counties Premier Division	46	25	9	12	112	64	84	7th	First Qualifying Round	Surrey Senior Cup	R2	Greg Ball	30	
2003–04	Combined Counties Premier Division	46	25	9	12	112	64	84	7th	First Qualifying Round	Southern Combination Cup	R2	Greg Ball	30	
2004–05	Combined Counties Premier Division	46	38	4	4	134	35	118	1st	First Qualifying Round	FA Vase	QR1	Craig Carley	29	
2004–05	Combined Counties Premier Division	46	38	4	4	134	35	118	1st	First Qualifying Round	Counties Challenge Cup	QF	Craig Carley	29	
2004–05	Combined Counties Premier Division	46	38	4	4	134	35	118	1st	First Qualifying Round	Surrey Senior Cup	QF	Craig Carley	29	
2005–06	Isthmian Division One	44	16	10	18	68	75	58	15th	Preliminary Round	FA Trophy	QR1	Greg Ball	19	
2005–06	Isthmian Division One	44	16	10	18	68	75	58	15th	Preliminary Round	Isthmian League Cup	R1	Greg Ball	19	
2005–06	Isthmian Division One	44	16	10	18	68	75	58	15th	Preliminary Round	Surrey Senior Cup	R2	Greg Ball	19	
2006–07	Isthmian Division One South	42	11	13	18	57	71	46	17th	Preliminary Round	FA Trophy	QR2	Craig Carley	21	
2006–07	Isthmian Division One South	42	11	13	18	57	71	46	17th	Preliminary Round	Isthmian League Cup	R4	Craig Carley	21	
2006–07	Isthmian Division One South	42	11	13	18	57	71	46	17th	Preliminary Round	Surrey Senior Cup	R3	Craig Carley	21	
2007–08	Isthmian Division One South	42	11	15	16	55	68	48	16th	Preliminary Round	FA Trophy	PRE	Nana Badu	15	
2007–08	Isthmian Division One South	42	11	15	16	55	68	48	16th	Preliminary Round	Isthmian League Cup	SF	Nana Badu	15	
2007–08	Isthmian Division One South	42	11	15	16	55	68	48	16th	Preliminary Round	Surrey Senior Cup	R3	Nana Badu	15	
2008–09	Isthmian Division One South	42	12	8	22	43	60	44	17th	First Qualifying Round	FA Trophy	QR1	Paul Armstrong, Daniel Platel, Matt Weston	5	
2008–09	Isthmian Division One South	42	12	8	22	43	60	44	17th	First Qualifying Round	Isthmian League Cup	R2	Paul Armstrong, Daniel Platel, Matt Weston	5	
2008–09	Isthmian Division One South	42	12	8	22	43	60	44	17th	First Qualifying Round	Surrey Senior Cup	R3	Paul Armstrong, Daniel Platel, Matt Weston	5	
2009–10	Isthmian Division One South	42	8	10	24	41	66	34	21st	Third Qualifying Round	FA Trophy	PRE	Martin Grant	19	
2009–10	Isthmian Division One South	42	8	10	24	41	66	34	21st	Third Qualifying Round	Isthmian League Cup	R3	Martin Grant	19	
2009–10	Isthmian Division One South	42	8	10	24	41	66	34	21st	Third Qualifying Round	Surrey Senior Cup	R1	Martin Grant	19	
2010–11	Isthmian Division One South	42	15	8	19	65	71	53	12th	First Qualifying Round	FA Trophy	QR1	Danny Buckle	14	
2010–11	Isthmian Division One South	42	15	8	19	65	71	53	12th	First Qualifying Round	Isthmian League Cup	R4	Danny Buckle	14	
2010–11	Isthmian Division One South	42	15	8	19	65	71	53	12th	First Qualifying Round	Surrey Senior Cup	R2	Danny Buckle	14	
2011–12	Isthmian Division One South	40	12	6	22	51	74	42	15th	Preliminary Round	FA Trophy	PRE	Charlie Ide	7	
2011–12	Isthmian Division One South	40	12	6	22	51	74	42	15th	Preliminary Round	Isthmian League Cup	R1	Charlie Ide	7	
2011–12	Isthmian Division One South	40	12	6	22	51	74	42	15th	Preliminary Round	Surrey Senior Cup	R3	Charlie Ide	7	
2012–13	Isthmian Division One South	42	9	10	23	50	90	37	22nd	Preliminary Round	FA Trophy	PRE	Sol Patterson-Bohner, Mu Maan	9	
2012–13	Isthmian Division One South	42	9	10	23	50	90	37	22nd	Preliminary Round	Isthmian League Cup	R3	Sol Patterson-Bohner, Mu Maan	9	
2012–13	Isthmian Division One South	42	9	10	23	50	90	37	22nd	Preliminary Round	Surrey Senior Cup	R2	Sol Patterson-Bohner, Mu Maan	9	
2012–13	Isthmian Division One South	42	9	10	23	50	90	37	22nd	Preliminary Round	Southern Combination Cup	R2	Sol Patterson-Bohner, Mu Maan	9	
2013–14	Isthmian Division One South	46	22	4	29	90	94	70	9th	Preliminary Round	FA Trophy	PRE	Gabriel Odunaike	22	
2013–14	Isthmian Division One South	46	22	4	29	90	94	70	9th	Preliminary Round	Isthmian League Cup	R2	Gabriel Odunaike	22	
2013–14	Isthmian Division One South	46	22	4	29	90	94	70	9th	Preliminary Round	Surrey Senior Cup	R3	Gabriel Odunaike	22	
2013–14	Isthmian Division One South	46	22	4	29	90	94	70	9th	Preliminary Round	Southern Combination Cup	QF	Gabriel Odunaike	22	
2014–15	Isthmian Division One South	46	16	2	25	62	94	53	18th	Preliminary Round	FA Trophy	QR1	Gabriel Odunaike	15	
2014–15	Isthmian Division One South	46	16	2	25	62	94	53	18th	Preliminary Round	Isthmian League Cup	R2	Gabriel Odunaike	15	
2014–15	Isthmian Division One South	46	16	2	25	62	94	53	18th	Preliminary Round	Surrey Senior Cup	R2	Gabriel Odunaike	15	
2014–15	Isthmian Division One South	46	16	2	25	62	94	53	18th	Preliminary Round	Southern Combination Cup	R3	Gabriel Odunaike	15	
2015–16	Isthmian Division One South	46	18	6	22	74	85	60	16th	Preliminary Round	FA Trophy	QR1	Gabriel Odunaike & Scott Day	16	
2015–16	Isthmian Division One South	46	18	6	22	74	85	60	16th	Preliminary Round	Isthmian League Cup	R2	Gabriel Odunaike & Scott Day	16	
2015–16	Isthmian Division One South	46	18	6	22	74	85	60	16th	Preliminary Round	Surrey Senior Cup	R2	Gabriel Odunaike & Scott Day	16	
2015–16	Isthmian Division One South	46	18	6	22	74	85	60	16th	Preliminary Round	Southern Combination Cup	R1	Gabriel Odunaike & Scott Day	16	
2016-17	Isthmian Division One South	46	19	8	19	98	99	65	13th	Third Qualifying Round	FA Trophy	QR1	Gabriel Odunaike	27	
2016-17	Isthmian Division One South	46	19	8	19	98	99	65	13th	Third Qualifying Round	Isthmian League Cup	R1	Gabriel Odunaike	27	
2016-17	Isthmian Division One South	46	19	8	19	98	99	65	13th	Third Qualifying Round	Surrey Senior Cup	R2	Gabriel Odunaike	27	
2016-17	Isthmian Division One South	46	19	8	19	98	99	65	13th	Third Qualifying Round	Southern Combination Cup	SF	Gabriel Odunaike	27	
2017–18	Isthmian Division One South	46	25	11	10	98	52	86	6th	First Qualifying Round	FA Trophy	QR1	Josh Kelly	40	
2018–19	Southern League Premier Division South	42	14	9	19	69	78	51	17th	Second Qualifying Round	FA Trophy	QR3	James Ewington	39	

== Key ==
P – games played
W – games won
D – games drawn
L – games lost
F – goals for
A – goals against
Pts – points
Pos – final position
DNP – did not participate
PRE – preliminary round
QR1 – first qualifying round
QR2 – second qualifying round
R1 – first round
R2 – second round
R3 – third round
R4 – fourth round
QF – quarter-finals
SF – semi-finals
RUN - runners-up
WIN - winners

Full cup competition names

- Surrey Challenge Cup - Surrey County Premier League Challenge Cup
- Counties Challenge Cup - Combined Counties League Challenge Cup
- Southern Combination Cup - Southern Combination Challenge Cup
- SPC - To be confirmed
- RPC - To be confirmed
