= Paul Mitchell (footballer, born 1971) =

English footballer

Personal information
- Full name: Paul Robert Mitchell
- Date of birth: 20 October 1971 (age 55)
- Place of birth: Poole, England
- Position: Midfielder

Senior career*
Years	Team	Apps	(Gls)
1990–1994	AFC Bournemouth	16	(0)
1994–1996	West Ham United	1	(0)
1996	AFC Bournemouth	4	(0)
1996–1998	Torquay United	36	(1)
1998–?	Barry Town		
- * Club domestic league appearances and goals

Paul Mitchell (born 20 October 1971) is an English former footballer who played as a midfielder. In 1994, Mitchell transferred to West Ham United, but would later transfer back to AFC Bournemouth. Following his playing career, Mitchell transitioned into a role as a correspondent for Opta Sports.
