= Tony Gale =

English footballer

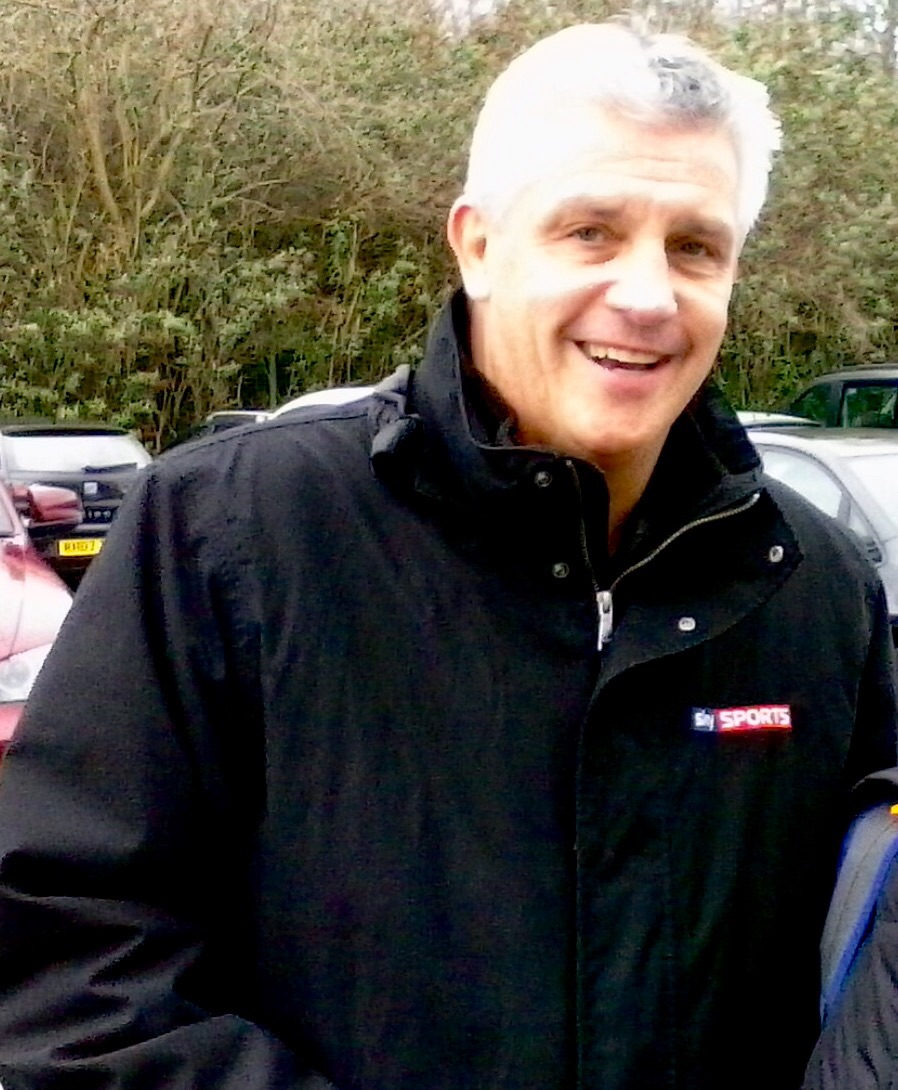
- Gale outside the King Power Stadium, Leicester in 2015

Personal information
- Full name: Anthony Peter Gale
- Date of birth: 19 November 1959 (age 66)
- Place of birth: Westminster, London, England
- Height: 6 ft 1 in (1.85 m)
- Position: Defender

Youth career
- 1976–1977: Fulham

Senior career*
Years	Team	Apps	(Gls)
1977–1984	Fulham	277	(19)
1984–1994	West Ham United	300	(5)
1994–1995	Blackburn Rovers	15	(0)
1995–1996	Crystal Palace	2	(0)
1996–1998	Maidenhead United	42	(0)
Total		636	(24)

International career
1977–1978	England Youth	7	(1)
1982	England U21	1	(0)

Managerial career
- 2013: Walton Casuals (caretaker)
- 2014: Walton Casuals (caretaker)
- * Club domestic league appearances and goals

Anthony Peter Gale (born 19 November 1959) is an English football coach, former professional footballer and television pundit for Sky Sports. He was also the chairman of non-league club Walton Casuals.

As a player, he made 636 appearances as a defender from 1977 until 1998, notably in the Premier League with West Ham United and Blackburn Rovers, where he won the title in 1995. He also played for Fulham, Crystal Palace and Maidenhead United.

Since retiring he has worked as a pundit, co-commentator and sports writer, notably for Premier League productions, Sky Sports and former clubs West Ham and Fulham.

== Playing career ==
=== Fulham ===
After progressing through the youth ranks of Fulham, Gale was promoted to the first team ahead of the 1977–78 season. Making his debut for the first team aged 16 in the Anglo-Scottish Cup against Orient, he was drafted in to the senior squad to replace World Cup winning Bobby Moore following his retirement from English football. Recording 38 league appearances and eight goals in his inaugural season, Gale cemented his place in the squad during their time in the Second Division.

Suffering relegation to the Third Division after a 20th-placed finish during the 1979–80 season, Gale bounced back to the Second Division two years later. A dispute with manager Malcolm MacDonald saw Gale suspended shortly after the start of the season, but he returned to the first team set-up shortly after to make 44 league appearances as Fulham gained promotion back to the second tier.

Gale narrowly missed out on promotion to the First Division during the 1982–83 season, with Fulham finishing in fourth place and a single point behind Leicester City. After a mid-table finish the following season, Gale opted for a move away from Craven Cottage in order to play in the First Division.

=== West Ham United ===
In July 1984, Gale completed a £200,000 transfer to West Ham United, and went on to make 300 league appearances over a decade. Finishing 16th in his first season with the club, Gale was part of the side to finish third in the First Division in 1986 while forming a notable partnership with Alvin Martin. He spent all but one season in mid-table before West Ham's relegation to the Second Division following the 1988–89 season.

When playing in the 1991 FA Cup semi-final against Nottingham Forest, Gale became the first-ever footballer in the English game to be shown a straight red card for denying an attacker a goal-scoring opportunity with a professional foul. After bringing down Gary Crosby in the 22nd minute, Gale's single career dismissal by Keith Hackett was deemed as unfair by West Ham fans as they suffered a 4–0 defeat to Forest and missed out on their chances of a first FA Cup final since 1980. It took the Hammers another 15 years before reaching the final once again.

West Ham were promoted back to the First Division in 1991 at the second time of asking, but were relegated again after just one season back among the elite.

In 1993, West Ham returned to the top tier of English football, now rebranded as the Premier League, and finished in 13th during Gale's final season with the club. In 1994 Gale was awarded a testimonial by West Ham. He received an estimated £50,000 from the game, a 4–2 win at Upton Park against a Republic of Ireland team.

=== Blackburn Rovers ===
After his release from West Ham in 1994, Gale trained with Barnet before receiving a call from Blackburn Rovers manager Kenny Dalglish. Joining on 11 August, he made his debut three days later in the 1994 Charity Shield, suffering a 2–0 defeat to Manchester United after goals from Eric Cantona and Paul Ince. Spending a single season at Ewood Park, Gale made 15 appearances in the club's 1994–95 Premier League winning campaign and clinched the only major honour of his playing career aged 35. Despite being asked by newly appointed manager Ray Harford to remain with the club for a second season, Gale opted against a coaching role while playing for the reserves. He later admitted it was a decision he regretted, after his only season playing outside of the London area.

=== Crystal Palace ===
After Blackburn's title triumph, Gale signed for relegated Crystal Palace. However, his time at Selhurst Park was plagued with injuries and he managed just two league appearances for the club halfway through that season, and retired from professional football at the end of it.

=== Maidenhead United ===
Gale joined Maidenhead United – managed by his former West Ham teammate, Alan Devonshire – in 1996, continuing his playing career at non-league level for two more seasons before finally retiring from playing aged 39.

== Media career ==
Gale has been heard commentating on Premier League games for Premier League Productions, a venture of IMG Sports Media who produce, package and broadcast the live production of games for the Premier League for international broadcasters. For the 16/17 season he is part of the commentary team for Premier League games aired in the US on NBC.

Gale has also contributed a regular column for West Ham's official website, WHUFC.com, along with a fortnightly column for Fulham's official website.

== Personal life ==
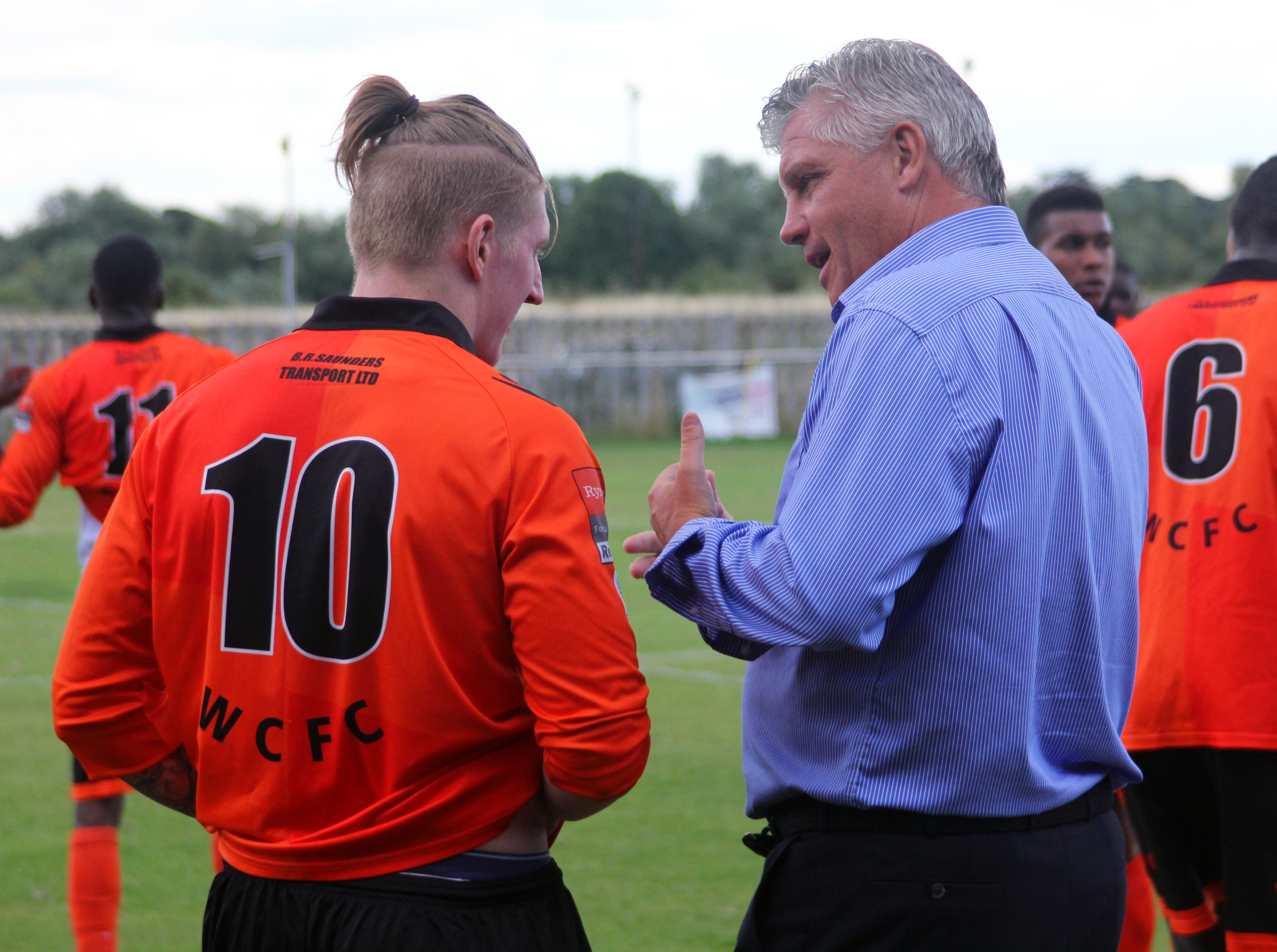
Tony Gale joined Walton Casuals as Director of Football in 2002.

He supported Chelsea as a child and said Peter Osgood was his childhood hero. He cited Fulham's 1–1 draw against Lincoln City in the 1981-82 season as his most memorable game as they earned promotion to Division Two. He said missing promotion to the First Division with Fulham in 1982–83 by one point was his biggest disappointment. His hobbies include watching other sports. His favourite TV shows are Only Fools and Horses and EastEnders and said that Frank Sinatra and George Benson are his favourite musicians.

During his time at West Ham, Gale was nicknamed 'Reggie' by his teammates. The name came from the comparison to Reggie Kray for his wicked sense of humour. He was also described by teammate Mark Ward as having the touch and vision of a centre forward.

Gale was the chairman of the now-defunct Isthmian Division One South side Walton Casuals, having joined the club as Director of Football in 2003. He became chairman in 2011 and enjoyed two brief spells as caretaker manager. First taking over in March 2013 for eight games to see out the 2012–13 season, he also led the team for 12 games from September to November 2014.

He is married to his wife Lyndsey. His son, Anthony, made over 200 appearances for Walton Casuals and took over as manager in July 2015 after working alongside his father as caretaker manager in late 2014.

In 2023 his autobiography, "That's Entertainment" was published.

== Honours ==
Blackburn Rovers

- Premier League: 1994–95
