= 1995–96 Carlisle United F.C. season =

Carlisle United F.C.
1995–96 season
- Chairman: Michael Knighton
- Manager: Mick Wadsworth; Mervyn Day
- Stadium: Brunton Park
- Second Division: 21st (relegated)
- FA Cup: First round
- League Cup: First round
- Football League Trophy: Area final

For the 1995–96 season, Carlisle United F.C. competed in Football League Division Two.

== Results & fixtures ==
=== Football League Second Division ===
==== League table ====
Pos	Team	Pld	W	D	L	GF	GA	GD	Pts	Promotion or relegation
19	Peterborough United	46	13	13	20	59	66	−7	52	
20	York City	46	13	13	20	58	73	−15	52	
21	Carlisle United (R)	46	12	13	21	57	72	−15	49	Relegation to the Third Division
22	Swansea City (R)	46	11	14	21	43	79	−36	47	Relegation to the Third Division
23	Brighton & Hove Albion (R)	46	10	10	26	46	69	−23	40	Relegation to the Third Division

(R) Relegated

==== Matches ====
Match Day	Date	Opponent	H/A	Score	Carlisle United Scorer(s)	Attendance
1	12 August	Bristol Rovers	H	1–2		8,003
2	19 August	Chesterfield	A	0–3		3,634
3	26 August	Swindon Town	H	0–1		6,333
4	29 August	Rotherham United	A	2–2		3,350
5	1 September	Swansea City	A	1–1		3,345
6	9 September	Burnley	H	2–0		7,318
7	12 September	Peterborough United	H	1–1		6,027
8	16 September	Oxford United	A	0–4		5,046
9	23 September	Hull City	H	2–0		5,986
10	30 September	Walsall	A	1–2		4,214
11	7 October	Notts County	H	0–0		6,058
12	14 October	Crewe Alexandra	A	1–2		4,512
13	21 October	Bradford City	H	2–2		6,263
14	28 October	Bournemouth	A	0–2		4,250
15	31 October	Wrexham	A	2–3		2,939
16	4 November	Brighton and Hove Albion	H	1–0		5,896
17	18 November	Bristol City	A	1–1		5,423
18	26 November	Wycombe Wanderers	H	4–2		4,459
19	2 December	Burnley	A	0–2		8,299
20	9 December	Hull City	A	5–2		3,478
21	16 December	Walsall	H	1–1		5,308
22	26 December	Stockport County	A	0–2		5,941
23	30 December	Shrewsbury Town	A	1–1		2,864
24	1 January	Blackpool	H	1–2		7,532
25	13 January	Chesterfield	H	1–1		5,852
26	20 January	Bristol Rovers	A	1–1		5,178
27	3 February	Swindon Town	A	1–2		8,367
28	10 February	Brentford	H	2–1		5,143
29	17 February	Peterborough United	A	1–6		4,302
30	20 February	Swansea City	H	3–0		4,645
31	24 February	Oxford United	H	1–2		5,525
32	2 March	Stockport County	H	0–1		4,849
33	9 March	York City	A	1–1		3,965
34	16 March	Shrewsbury Town	H	1–1		3,760
35	19 March	Brentford	A	1–1		3,102
36	23 March	Blackpool	A	1–3		8,144
37	26 March	Rotherham United	H	2–0		4,074
38	30 March	Notts County	A	1–3		4,515
39	2 April	Crewe Alexandra	H	1–0		4,698
40	6 April	Bournemouth	H	4–0		5,401
41	8 April	Bradford City	A	1–3		6,156
42	13 April	Wrexham	H	1–2		7,317
43	20 April	Brighton and Hove Albion	A	0–1		6,131
44	23 April	York City	H	2–0		4,813
45	27 April	Wycombe Wanderers	A	0–4		3,964
46	4 May	Bristol City	H	2–1		5,925

=== Football League Cup ===
Round	Date	Opponent	H/A	Score	Carlisle United Scorer(s)	Attendance
R1 L1	15 August	Hull City	A	2–1		2,779
R1 L2	22 August	Hull City	H	2–4		4,250

=== FA Cup ===
Round	Date	Opponent	H/A	Score	Carlisle United Scorer(s)	Attendance
R1	11 November	Preston North End	H	1–2		

=== Football League Trophy ===
Round	Date	Opponent	H/A	Score	Carlisle United Scorer(s)	Attendance
GS	17 October	Bradford City	A	1–1		1,287
GS	7 November	Doncaster Rovers	H	1–1		4,421
R2	28 November	Wrexham	A	2–1		2,522
QF	6 January	Burnley	H	5–0		5,169
SF	30 January	Chesterfield	H	1–0		5,511
F L1 (North)	5 March	Rotherham United	A	0–2		6,858
F L2 (North)	12 March	Rotherham United	H	0–2		6,692
