= Paul Marquis =

English footballer

Personal information
- Full name: Paul Raymond Marquis
- Date of birth: 29 August 1972 (age 54)
- Place of birth: Enfield, England
- Position: Central defender

Youth career
- Cheshunt
- West Ham United

Senior career*
Years	Team	Apps	(Gls)
1988–1989	Cheshunt	15	(3)
1991–1994	West Ham United	1	(0)
1994–1997	Doncaster Rovers	29	(1)
1995	→ Gateshead (loan)	6	(1)
1997–1998	Gateshead	26	(3)
- St Albans City
- Bradford Park Avenue
- * Club domestic league appearances and goals

Paul Marquis (born 29 August 1972) is an English former football defender.

Marquis came through the schoolboy sides of Cheshunt and made 15 appearances for their first team as an eighteen-year-old before moving to the youth squad for West Ham United. Graduating through the reserve team, Marquis played only 60 seconds of first-team football for West Ham, coming on in the 90th minute for Mike Marsh, in February 1994, in a 0–0 draw with Manchester City. In March 1994 Marquis was given a free transfer by West Ham and was signed by Doncaster Rovers.
