= 2026 National League Cup final =

Association football match in England

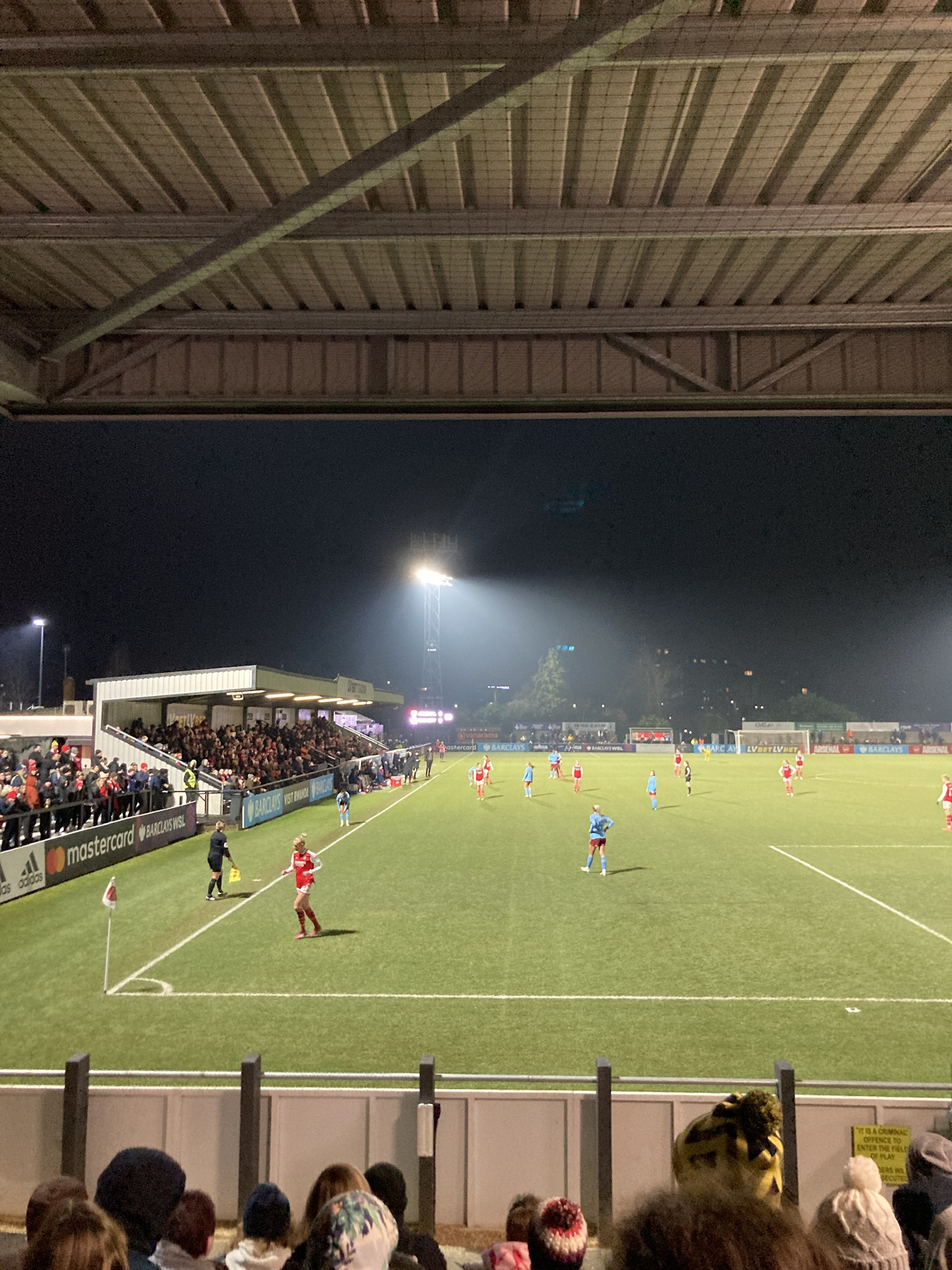
- Meadow Park hosted the final.
- Event: 2025–26 National League Cup
| Boreham Wood | West Ham United U21 |
| 2 | 2 |
- Boreham Wood won 7–6 on penalties
- Date: 17 March 2026
- Venue: Meadow Park, Borehamwood
- Referee: Elliott Swallow
- Attendance: 2,803

The 2026 National League Cup final was an association football match. It was played on 17 March 2026 between National League side Boreham Wood and Premier League 2 side West Ham United U21 and decided the winners of the 2025–26 National League Cup, a knock-out tournament comprising clubs from National League and Premier League 2.

Boreham Wood won the final 7–6 on penalties, after the game was tied at 2–2 after 90 minutes.

== Route to the final ==
Note: In all results below, the score of the finalist is given first (H: home; A: away).

| Boreham Wood | | Round | West Ham United U21 | |
|---|---|---|---|---|
| Opponent | Result | Group stage | Opponent | Result |
| Nottingham Forest U21 | 2–0 (H) | Matchday 1 | Woking | 2–0 (A) |
| West Bromwich Albion U21 | 3–1 (H) | Matchday 2 | Sutton United | 3–3 (A) (4–3 (p)) |
| Leicester City U21 | 4–3 (H) | Matchday 3 | Truro City | 3–0 (A) |
| Wolverhampton Wanderers U21 | 4–0 (H) | Matchday 4 | Aldershot Town | 5–1 (A) |
| Group B: Pos / Team / Pld / Pts; 1 / Boreham Wood / 4 / 12; 2 / Braintree Town / 4 / 9; 3 / Wealdstone / 4 / 9; 4 / Forest Green Rovers / 4 / 7; 5 / Nottingham Forest U21 / 4 / 6; Source: Premier League | | Final standings | Group C: Pos / Team / Pld / Pts; 1 / West Ham United U21 / 4 / 11; 2 / Truro City / 4 / 9; 3 / Woking / 4 / 8; 4 / Brighton & Hove Albion U21 / 4 / 7; 5 / Aldershot Town / 4 / 4; Source: Premier League | |
| Opponent | Result | Knockout stage | Opponent | Result |
| Brackley Town | 5–2 (H) | Quarter-final | Boston United | 2–1 (A) |
| Truro City | 2–0 (H) | Semi-final | Tamworth | 1–3 (A) |

== Match ==
=== Details ===
17 March 2026
19:00 GMT (UTC+0)

| Boreham Wood | 2–2 | West Ham United U21 |
|---|---|---|
| Abdulmalik 49'; Henry 90+3' | Report | Orford 26'; Landers 45' |
Penalties
| Brunt (penalty scored); Rush (penalty scored); Henry (penalty scored); Coxe (penalty scored); Sousa (penalty scored); Bush (penalty scored); O'Connell (penalty scored) | 7–6 | (penalty scored) Ajala; (penalty scored) Orford; (penalty scored) Golambeckis; (penalty scored) Briggs; (penalty scored) Cummings; (penalty scored) Battrum; (penalty missed) Caliste |

Meadow Park, Borehamwood
Attendance: 2,803
Referee: Elliott Swallow

| Boreham Wood | West Ham United U21 |

| GK | 22 | (England) Ted Curd |
| RB | 3 | (England) Femi Ilesanmi | | (substituted off) 84' |
| CB | 5 | (England) Chris Bush |
| CB | 6 | (England) Charlie O'Connell |
| LB | 16 | (England) Callum Reynolds (c) | | (substituted off) 46' |
| CM | 8 | (England) Zak Brunt | (yellow card) 63' |
| CM | 23 | (England) Regan Booty | | (substituted off) 75' |
| RW | 19 | (England) Tom White | | (substituted off) 90' |
| AM | 10 | (England) Abdul Abdulmalik |
| LW | 20 | (England) Lewis Richardson | | (substituted off) 46' |
| CF | 32 | (England) Matt Rush |
Substitutes:
| DF | 2 | (Wales) Cameron Coxe | | (substituted on) 46' |
| DF | 12 | (England) Joe Newton | | (substituted on) 84' |
| DF | 17 | (England) Charles Clayden |
| MF | 4 | (England) Jack Payne |
| MF | 7 | (Portugal) Erico Sousa | | (substituted on) 90' |
| MF | 11 | (Republic of Ireland) Leon Ayinde | (yellow card) 75' | (substituted on) 46' |
| MF | 14 | (England) Aaron Henry | | (substituted on) 75' |
Manager:
(England) Luke Garrard

| GK | 1 | (England) Finley Herrick |
| RB | 2 | (England) Ryan Battrum |
| CB | 5 | (England) Airidas Golambeckis (c) |
| CB | 4 | (England) Tyron Akpata | (substituted off) 46' |
| LB | 2 | (Greece) Rayan Oyebade |
| CM | 8 | (England) Lewis Orford |
| CM | 6 | (Northern Ireland) Josh Briggs |
| LW | 7 | (England) Preston Fearon | (substituted off) 83' |
| AM | 10 | (England) Joshua Ajala |
| RW | 11 | (England) Regan Clayton |
| CF | 9 | (Scotland) Josh Landers | (substituted off) 88' |
Substitutes:
| GK | 13 | (England) Finley Hooper |
| MF | 14 | (Mauritius) Gabriel Caliste | (substituted on) 83' |
| MF | 15 | (England) Jethro Medine | (substituted on) 46' |
| FW | 12 | (Scotland) Daniel Cummings | (substituted on) 88' |
| FW | 16 | (Northern Ireland) Callum Leacock |
| FW | 17 | (England) Riley Hargan |
| FW | 18 | (England) Andre Dike |
Manager:
(England) Greg Lincoln

Match rules

- 90 minutes
- Penalty shoot-out if necessary
- Seven named substitutes
- Maximum of five substitutions
