= Lewis Orford =

Lewis Orford may refer to:

- Lewis Orford (cricketer) (1865–1948), English lawyer and cricketer
- Lewis Orford (footballer) (born 2006), English footballer
