= Orford (surname) =

Orford is a surname. Notable people with the surname include:

- Charles Orford (1899–1977), English footballer
- Jeff Orford, Australian rugby league footballer
- John Orford, British classical bassoonist
- Lewis Orford (cricketer) (1865–1948), English lawyer and cricketer
- Lewis Orford (footballer) (born 2006), English footballer
- Margie Orford, South African writer
- Martin Orford, keyboard player of the progressive rock band IQ
- Matt Orford, Australian rugby league footballer
- Nicole Orford, Canadian ice dancer
- Robert Orford, Bishop of Ely from 1302 to 1310
- Sandy Orford (1911–1986), Welsh rugby league player and wrestler

== Fictional people ==
- Ellen Orford, a character in Benjamin Britten's 1945 opera Peter Grimes

== See also ==
- Earl of Orford
