= Mohamadou Kanté =

Malian footballer (born 2005)

Personal information
- Full name: Mohamadou Kanté
- Date of birth: 20 September 2005 (age 21)
- Place of birth: Paris, France
- Height: 1.95 m (6 ft 5 in)
- Position: Midfielder

Team information
- Current team: West Ham United
- Number: 17

Youth career
- –2021: Jeunesse Aubervilliers
- 2021–2024: Paris FC

Senior career*
Years	Team	Apps	(Gls)
2023–2024	Paris FC B	9	(2)
2024–	West Ham United	25	(3)
2024–2025	→ Paris FC (loan)	6	(0)
2025–	West Ham United	11	(0)

International career^{‡}
2026–	Mali	2	(0)
- * Club domestic league appearances and goals as of 17:11, 7 November 2026 (UTC) ‡ National team caps and goals as of 01:30, 18 November 2026 (UTC)

Mohamadou Kanté (born 20 September 2005) is a professional footballer who plays as a midfielder for EFL Championship club West Ham United. Born in France, he plays for the Mali national team.

He began his senior career in France with Paris FC before joining West Ham in 2024. After spending the 2024–25 season back at Paris FC on loan, he returned to England and made his Premier League debut for West Ham in December 2025.

== Club career ==
=== Early career and Paris FC ===
Kanté was born in Paris, France, on 20 September 2005. He began playing at youth level with Jeunesse Aubervilliers before joining the youth system of Paris FC in 2021. He progressed through Paris FC’s academy and represented the club’s reserve side. In the 2023–24 season, he scored two goals in nine matches for Paris FC B in the Régional 1. He was also involved around the senior squad as his development at the club continued.

=== West Ham United and loan to Paris FC ===
On 22 August 2024, it was announced that he had signed a five-year contract with Premier League club West Ham United. As part of the arrangement, he was loaned back to Paris FC for the rest of the 2024–25 season.

During the loan spell, Kanté made six league appearances for Paris FC as the club finished second in Ligue 2 and gained promotion to Ligue 1. His appearances came predominantly during the closing months of the campaign as he began to receive regular senior playing time.

==== 2025–26 season ====
Kanté returned to West Ham ahead of the 2025–26 season and initially featured prominently for the club’s under-21 side. He scored on his first competitive appearance for the under-21s, in a 2–0 National League Cup victory over Woking on 13 August 2025. He subsequently scored in Premier League 2 matches against Manchester City and Sunderland during August and against Liverpool in November, while also featuring in the EFL Trophy and further in the National League Cup.

On 27 October 2025, West Ham announced that Kanté had signed a new contract with the club, extending his stay until the summer of 2031. His progress at under-21 level led to involvement with the senior squad. On 4 December 2025, Kanté made his debut for West Ham, coming on as an 83rd minute substitute in a 1–1 Premier League draw against Manchester United. He went on to make 10 further substitute appearances in the Premier League during the remainder of the season.

Kanté also gained his first senior starts during West Ham’s 2025–26 FA Cup campaign. On 14 February 2026, he started the fourth-round tie away to Burton Albion, which West Ham won 1–0 after extra time. He retained a place in the starting XI for the fifth-round match against Brentford at the London Stadium on 9 March, with West Ham advancing following a penalty shoot-out. He later appeared as a substitute in the quarter-final against Leeds United.

Across the 2025–26 season, Kanté made 14 senior appearances for West Ham, comprising eleven in the Premier League and three in the FA Cup. West Ham finished 18th in the Premier League and were relegated to the EFL Championship at the end of the season.

==== 2026–27 season ====
Following West Ham’s relegation, Kanté became more involved in the first-team starting XI at the beginning of the 2026–27 season season. On 16 August 2026, he started West Ham’s opening Championship fixture away to Burnley. With West Ham leading 1–0, Kanté advanced down the right side of the penalty area and created the chance from which Manor Solomon scored the visitors’ second goal in the 72nd minute. Burnley subsequently recovered to draw the match 2–2.

On 5 September 2026, Kanté scored his first goal for the club, scoring the third in a 3–0 win against Derby County. On 19 September 2026, Kanté picked up his first red card of his career, after committing a professional foul on Millwall winger Kyrell Lisbie. Kanté also scored in the game against their rivals, scoring West Ham's first in an eventual 2–2 draw to take his tally to three for the season.

== International career ==
Born in France, Kanté is of Malian and Senegalese descent.

In November 2026, Kanté was called up to the Mali national football team for the 2027 Africa Cup of Nations qualifiers.

== Style of play ==
Kanté is primarily a central midfielder. During his development at West Ham, he was regularly deployed in a deeper midfield role for the under-21 side, while also being used as a central midfielder. However, for the first team, he has been used in attacking roles like as an attacking midfielder, a left midfielder, and as a striker. His game has been associated with physical strength, stamina and the ability to contribute in both defensive and attacking phases.

== Career statistics ==
As of match played 31 October 2026

Appearances and goals by club, season and competition
Club	Season	League			National cup (Note: Includes Coupe de France, FA Cup)		League cup (Note: Includes EFL Cup)		Other		Total	
Club	Season	Division	Apps	Goals	Apps	Goals	Apps	Goals	Apps	Goals	Apps	Goals
Paris FC B	2023–24	Régional 1	9	2	0	0	—		—		9	2
West Ham United	2024–25	Premier League	0	0	0	0	0	0	—		0	0
West Ham United	2025–26	Premier League	11	0	3	0	0	0	—		14	0
West Ham United	2026–27	Championship	12	3	0	0	3	0	—		15	3
West Ham United	Total		23	3	3	0	3	0	0	0	29	3
Paris FC (loan)	2024–25	Ligue 2	6	0	0	0	—		—		6	0
West Ham United U21	2025–26	—			—		—		5 (Note: Appearances in EFL Trophy)	0	5	0
Career total			38	5	3	0	3	0	5	0	49	5
