= Joshua Ajala =

English footballer (born 2006)

Personal information
- Full name: Joshua Oluwaseun Oladimeji Ajala
- Date of birth: 13 November 2006 (age 19)
- Place of birth: Redbridge, England
- Positions: Forward; left midfielder

Team information
- Current team: West Ham United
- Number: 66

Youth career
- –2023: Chelsea
- 2023–2026: West Ham United

Senior career*
Years	Team	Apps	(Gls)
2026–	West Ham United	1	(0)

International career^{‡}
2024	England U19	3	(0)
2025–	England U20	2	(0)
- * Club domestic league appearances and goals as of 11 September 2026 ‡ National team caps and goals as of 8 August 2026

Joshua Oluwaseun Oladimeji Ajala (born 13 November 2006) is an English professional footballer who plays as a forward or left midfielder for EFL Championship club West Ham United. He is an England youth international.

== Early life and youth career ==
Joshua Oluwaseun Oladimeji Ajala was born on 13 November 2006 in the London Borough of Redbridge. He is of Nigerian descent. Ajala played academy football for Chelsea before transferring to the West Ham United academy in 2023. He won the U18 Premier League Cup with West Ham in the 2024–25 season. The following season, Ajala was part of the West Ham team that finished as runners-up in the National League Cup, in which he was also the top scorer. He was awarded Premier League 2 player of the month in February 2026.

== Club career ==
Ajala was first named in the West Ham United first team squad for an FA Cup fourth round match against Burton Albion on 14 February 2026, where he was an unused substitute in the Hammers' 1–0 win. In the 2026–27 season, he was named in the first team season squad by manager Nuno Espírito Santo and assigned the shirt number 66. On 8 August 2026, Ajala made his first team debut as a 98th-minute substitute for Jarrod Bowen in a 3–1 EFL Cup win over Portsmouth. On 25 August, Ajala started in a 4–1 win over Southampton in the EFL Cup, in which he scored two goals before being replaced by Manor Solomon in the 59th minute. Ajala made his Championship debut in a 6–0 win over Wrexham at the London Stadium on 11 September 2026, coming on as an 81st-minute substitute for Bowen.

== International career ==
He was called up to the England under-19 national team by head coach Will Antwi in September 2024, where he made three appearances in friendlies against Italy, Croatia and Germany. In November 2025, he was called up to the under-20 team by head coach Ben Futcher where he made an appearance as substitute in a 1–1 friendly draw against Japan. In March 2026, Ajala played in a second friendly for the under-20s against Italy, with the match ending in a 3–3 draw.

== Career statistics ==
=== Club ===
As of match played 15 September 2026

Appearances and goals by club, season and competition
Club	Season	League			FA Cup		League Cup		Other		Total	
Club	Season	Division	Apps	Goals	Apps	Goals	Apps	Goals	Apps	Goals	Apps	Goals
West Ham United	2026–27	Championship	1	0	0	0	3	2	—		4	2
West Ham United	Total		1	0	0	0	3	2	—		4	2
Career total			1	0	0	0	3	2	—		4	2
