= 2026–27 West Ham United F.C. season =

English football team season

West Ham United
2026–27 season
- Chairwoman: Vanessa Gold
- Head coach: Scott Parker (from 4 November); Nuno Espírito Santo (until 3 November)
- Stadium: London Stadium
- Championship: 8th
- FA Cup: Third round
- EFL Cup: Third round
- Top goalscorer: League: Jarrod Bowen (7); All: Jarrod Bowen (9)
- Highest home attendance: 62,264 (v. Charlton Athletic, 22 August 2026, EFL Championship)
- Lowest home attendance: 53,369 (v. Portsmouth, 8 August 2026, EFL Cup)
- Biggest win: 6–0 (v. Wrexham, 11 September 2026, EFL Championship); 0–6 (v. Lincoln City, 14 October 2026, EFL Championship)
- Biggest defeat: 1–3 (v. West Bromwich Albion, 31 October 2026, EFL Championship)

The 2026–27 season is the 132nd season in the history of West Ham United Football Club, and the club's first season in the Championship since the 2011–12 season following their relegation from the Premier League in the preceding season. In addition to the domestic league, the club are also participating in the FA Cup and EFL Cup.

== Season Summary ==
=== August ===
West Ham kicked off their season in the EFL Cup first round, where they faced fellow Championship side Portsmouth. The Hammers went behind in the first half before a goal each by Taty Castellanos and Jarrod Bowen just before half-time saw West Ham go into the break with a lead. Another goal from Castellanos early in the second half made it 3–1 which was enough to see them progress to round 2.

The first league match of the season was against Burnley, away at Turf Moor. Burnley had been relegated along with West Ham at the end of the previous season. The Hammers took a 2–0 lead after Max Kilman scored his first goal for the club when heading in Bowen's first half corner, before Manor Solomon got a debut goal in the second half. The Hammers held a two-goal advantage until the 83rd minute before two late goals by Zian Flemming (including a penalty) for the home side saw Burnley come back to level at 2–2, which is how the match finished.

West Ham's first home league game was a London derby against near neighbours Charlton Athletic. This was the first league meeting between the two clubs since February 2007, when both teams were in the Premier League. The visitors took the lead after only 7 minutes through captain Lloyd Jones, who scored with an overhead kick following a long throw-in. Tyreece Campbell doubled Charlton's lead on 56 after a mistake by Konstantinos Mavropanos allowed Campbell to dispossess him, before dribbling and shooting into the corner from outside the box. West Ham dominated possession and debutant Joel Piroe scored on 63 minutes, shooting high into the roof of the net after Castellanos' initial shot was blocked by the Charlton goalkeeper. West Ham had the chance to level the match when they were awarded a 93rd minute penalty, after former Hammer Conor Coventry handballed in the box; however, Castellanos hit the post with his kick and the match ended in a 1–2 defeat for West Ham.

A much changed West Ham side travelled to St. Mary's to face Southampton in the 2nd round of the EFL Cup to. The Hammers again found themselves behind early on when Leo Scienza picked up a clearance and dribbled into the box before shooting low into the goal. West Ham found an equaliser in he 41st minute when 19 year-old academy prospect Josh Ajala headed in Lewis Orford's corner at the back post for his first senior goal. Ajala added a second goal on 53, firing into the bottom corner after good work from Divine Mukasa on the left. West Ham brought on Taty Castellanos and Bowen, both of whom made an impact - Taty making it 3–1 to the Hammers with a tap in from Joel Veltman's cutback, before Bowen scored West Ham's fourth in the 84th minute after receiving Orford's pass then cutting inside on his left foot and shooting into the corner. The final score was 4–1 to West Ham, who progressed to round 3.

West Ham made the short journey to Watford on 29th August. Once again, the Hammers found themselves behind early on when Amin Nabizada scored a solo effort after 20 minutes. West Ham were only behind for 7 minutes before Castellanos pressured Kevin Keben on Watford's right, forcing a mistake before Mattie Pollock turned the Argentine striker's low ball from the byline into his own net for 1–1. The Hammers dominated possession from then on and had chances to take the lead through Piroe, Solomon, new signing Arne Engels and Bowen but they could not find a winner and the match ended in a draw, meaning West Ham were still searching for their first league win of the season.

August was concluded with a home match against another side relegated from the Premier League in Wolverhampton Wanderers. The visitors had the chance to go top of the table with a win and were unbeaten so far in the season. Wolves had the better of the early play as West Ham struggled, with Raul Jimenez going close on two occasions and Jackson Tchatchoua also missing a good chance. Mateus Mane also hit the bar for Wolves before Mukasa scored a spectacular effort from 25-yards to put West Ham 1–0 up against the run of play on 33 minutes. This swung momentum in the Hammers' favour and Bowen made it 2–0 from the penalty spot on 40 after Piroe was fouled in the box. Wolves pulled a goal back two minutes before half time when Marshall Munetsi outpaced Mavropanos and took the ball on to score with a low shot. West Ham restored their 2-goal advantage in the 53rd minute when a fortunate deflection saw Mukasa's shot loop into the goal over Jose Sa for his second of the game, after collecting Bowen's pass. Three became four when Mavropanos slammed the ball into the roof of the net from close range following a corner; however, the Greek defender then turned in Jordan James' low cross for an own goal to reduce the deficit again. The final score was 4–2 to West Ham as they picked up their first league win of the campaign and inflicted Wolves' first defeat.

Adama Boiro signed on transfer deadline day, on loan from Atletic Bilbao. He joined Engels, Veltman, Solomon, Keiber Lamadrid and Edvin Austbo as major signings in the transfer window. The likes of El-Hadji Malick Diouf, Crysencio Summerville and Mateus Fernandes were among those players to leave for large fees, with James Ward-Prowse also returning to former club Southampton on a permanent deal and Niclas Fullkrug, Aaron Wan-Bissaka and Jean-Clair Todibo all joining other clubs on long-term loans.

=== September ===
The month began with a visit from Derby County to the London Stadium. West Ham took the lead early through Piroe, who tapped in on the goal line after Taty had headed Bowen's cross from the right back across the goalmouth. West Ham dominated the possession and chances but took until the 87th minute to find a second goal when substitute Austbo scored from close range after Bowen's attempt from Engels pass had rolled into his path unmarked and he scored with a low shot, his first goal for the club. Mohamadou Kante put the result beyond any doubt in stoppage time when he scored with a low drive from 20-yards, which was also his first West Ham goal as the Hammers won comfortably 3–0.

West Ham faced Bolton Wanderers in an away match on 8 September. This was the first league meeting between the two clubs since April 2011 when both were in the Premier League. An entertaining first half saw West Ham take the lead on 13 minutes when Bowen fired high into the net after Bolton looked to have cleared any danger. The match turned around following two Bolton goals in just under 10 minutes from Ethan Erhahon's smart low shot and a penalty from Ruben Rodrigues. The Hammers restored parity four minutes later when Engels’deep free kick from the right found Mavropanos unmarked at the far post to head in. Bowen scored a winner with just under a quarter of hour of normal time remaining when he steered Veltman's through ball inside the near post in an effort which Bazunu in the Bolton goal failed to keep out. the 3–2 victory for West Ham was their first league win against Bolton since May 2007 and their first ever win at Bolton's current stadium in any competition; the Hammers previous league victory at Bolton came in 1995 at Burnden Park.

West Ham faced Wrexham in their next league match at the London Stadium on 11 September . The Hammers recorded a 6–0 victory, their fourth consecutive league win, to move to the top of the Championship. Jarrod Bowen opened the scoring in the 28th minute, converting Morato’s low cross, before Piroe doubled the lead after being set up by Castellanos seven minutes before half-time. Mavropanos headed in Bowen’s corner three minutes after the restart, while Taty completed a counter-attack involving Kyle Walker-Peters to make it 4–0 in the 63rd minute. Kanté added a fifth after running onto Solomon’s pass, before Solomon completed the scoring in the 82nd minute. The result marked the first time in West Ham’s history in which six different players had scored for the club in a league match and it was also West Ham's biggest league win since April 2012.

Four days later, West Ham hosted Fulham in the third round of the EFL Cup. Rodrigo Muniz headed Fulham into the lead in the 13th minute, but Morato equalised three minutes later with a header following a set-piece. César Palacios restored the visitors’ advantage in the 37th minute before Pabloscored his first West Ham goal during first-half stoppage time, leaving the teams level at 2–2 at the interval. Substitute Oscar Bobb scored the decisive goal in the 78th minute, giving Fulham a 3–2 victory and eliminating West Ham from the League Cup. The Hammers came close to another equaliser when Timothy Castagne cleared Castellanos’ late effort from the goal line. Before the match, West Ham held a period of appreciation for former legendary goalkeeper Luděk Mikloško, who had died following a battle with cancer.

West Ham travelled to The Den to face rivals Millwall in the Championship on 19 September. It was the 100th competitive fixture between the clubs and their first meeting since 2012 when West Ham won 2–1, also in the Championship. Millwall took the lead in the 16th minute when Caleb Taylor scored from close range after Mads Hermansen had saved Mark Sykes’ initial effort. Camiel Neghli doubled the home side’s advantage in first-half stoppage time following another long throw from Lyndon Dykes. West Ham improved after introducing Kanté and Pablo at half-time. Kanté reduced the deficit with a low 25-yard strike in the 74th minute, before Mavropanos headed Solomon’s cross into the net six minutes later to complete the comeback. Kanté was subsequently sent off in the 89th minute after bringing down Kyrell Lisbie, but the ten-man Hammers held on for a 2–2 draw.

West Ham went into the 2-week international break in 2nd position in the Championship table, above Middlesbrough on goal difference and two points of 1st place Swansea City.

== Managerial changes ==
On 3 November, West Ham parted company with head coach Nuno Espírito Santo with the club in 8th place. A day later, Scott Parker was appointed on a two-and-a-half year contract.

== Squad ==
As of 5 September 2026

No.	Player	Nationality	Position(s)	Date of birth (age)	Signed from	Apps	Goals	Assists
Goalkeepers
1	Mads Hermansen	(Denmark)	GK	11 July 2000 (age 26)	(England) Leicester City	25	0	0
23	Alphonse Areola	(France)	GK	27 February 1993 (age 33)	(France) Paris Saint-Germain	124	0	0
49	Finlay Herrick	(England)	GK	18 January 2006 (age 20)	(England) West Ham Academy	2	0	0
Defenders
2	Kyle Walker-Peters	(England)	FB	13 April 1997 (age 29)	(England) Southampton	33	1	0
3	Maximilian Kilman	(England)	CB	23 May 1997 (age 29)	(England) Wolverhampton Wanderers	73	1	1
5	Morato (on loan from Nottingham Forest)	(Brazil)	CB	30 June 2001 (age 25)	(England) Nottingham Forest	1	0	0
15	Konstantinos Mavropanos	(Greece)	CB / RB	11 December 1997 (age 28)	(Germany) VfB Stuttgart	108	5	0
18	Adama Boiro (on loan from Athletic Bilbao)	(Spain)	LB	22 June 2002 (age 24)	(Spain) Athletic Bilbao	1	0	0
30	Ollie Scarles	(England)	LB	12 December 2005 (age 20)	(England) West Ham Academy	39	0	0
34	Joël Veltman	(Netherlands)	RB / CB	15 January 1992 (age 34)	(England) Brighton & Hove Albion	7	0	1
58	Airidas Golambeckis	(England)	DF	4 November 2007 (age 19)	(England) West Ham Academy	2	0	0
63	Ezra Mayers	(England)	DF	16 January 2007 (age 19)	(England) West Ham Academy	10	0	1
Midfielders
4	Edson Álvarez	(Mexico)	DM	24 October 1997 (age 29)	(Netherlands) Ajax	74	2	3
7	Arne Engels	(Belgium)	MF / RB / RW	8 September 2003 (age 23)	(Scotland) Celtic	5	0	1
17	Mohamadou Kanté	(France)	MF	20 September 2005 (age 21)	(France) Paris FC	21	1	1
21	Keiber Lamadrid	(Venezuela)	LM / LW	18 November 2003 (age 23)	(Venezuela) Deportivo La Guaira	3	0	0
27	Soungoutou Magassa	(France)	DM	8 October 2003 (age 23)	(France) Monaco	26	1	1
28	Tomáš Souček	(Czech Republic)	DM / CM	27 February 1995 (age 31)	(Czech Republic) Slavia Prague	282	46	11
61	Lewis Orford	(England)	MF	18 February 2006 (age 20)	(England) West Ham Academy	8	0	2
Forwards
9	Joël Piroe (on loan from Leeds United)	(Suriname)	ST	2 August 1999 (age 27)	(England) Leeds United	5	2	0
10	Manor Solomon	(Israel)	LW / RW	24 July 1999 (age 27)	(England) Tottenham Hotspur	6	1	0
11	Taty Castellanos	(Argentina)	ST	3 October 1998 (age 28)	(Italy) Lazio	31	10	4
14	Divine Mukasa (on loan from Manchester City)	(England)	FW / AM	22 August 2007 (age 19)	(England) Manchester City	5	2	1
19	Pablo	(Brazil)	ST	2 January 2004 (age 22)	(Portugal) Gil Vicente	20	0	2
20	Jarrod Bowen (captain)	(England)	RW / ST	20 December 1996 (age 29)	(England) Hull City	286	87	61
22	Maxwel Cornet	(Ivory Coast)	LW / FW	27 September 1996 (age 30)	(England) Burnley	37	1	6
35	Edvin Austbø	(Norway)	LW / LM	1 May 2005 (age 21)	(Norway) Viking	2	1	1
66	Joshua Ajala	(England)	FW	13 November 2006 (age 20)	(England) West Ham Academy	2	2	0

Last updated: 5 September 2026.
Source: West Ham United F.C.

== Transfers and contracts ==
The summer transfer window opened on 15 June 2026 and closed on 1 September 2026. The winter transfer window will open on 1 January 2027 and close on 1 February 2027.

=== In ===
Date	Pos.	Player	From	Fee	Ref.
20 June 2026	LW	(Venezuela) Keiber Lamadrid	(Venezuela) Deportivo La Guaira	£1,000,000	
1 July 2026 (Note: The transfer was announced on 23 June and became official on 1 July after Murphy's contract at Chelmsford City expired.)	CF	(England) Jett Murphy	(England) Chelmsford City	Free	
6 August 2026	RB	(Netherlands) Joël Veltman	(England) Brighton & Hove Albion	Free	
10 August 2026	LW	(Israel) Manor Solomon	(England) Tottenham Hotspur	£5,000,000 (Note: A potential further £2,000,000 in add-ons)	
15 August 2026	CM	(Belgium) Arne Engels	(Scotland) Celtic	£22,000,000	
31 August 2026	LW	(Norway) Edvin Austbø	(Norway) Viking	£11,000,000	

=== Out ===
Date	Pos.	Player	To	Fee	Ref.
1 July 2026 (Note: The transfer was announced on 19 June and became official on 1 July when the Czech First League transfer window opened.)	GK	(Hungary) Krisztián Hegyi	(Czech Republic) Sparta Prague	Undisclosed	
2 July 2026	CM	(Portugal) Mateus Fernandes	(England) Tottenham Hotspur	£85,000,000	
9 July 2026	CF	(England) Callum Wilson	(England) Brentford	Free	
9 July 2026	DF	(England) Emmanuel Fejokwu	(Belgium) Club NXT	Undisclosed	
24 July 2026	LW	(Netherlands) Crysencio Summerville	(Saudi Arabia) Al Hilal	£55,000,000 (Note: A potential further £5,000,000 in add-ons)	
30 July 2026	CF	(Northern Ireland) Callum Marshall	(England) Luton Town	Undisclosed	
4 August 2026	CDM	(England) Freddie Potts	(Belgium) Club Brugge	£10,200,000	
19 August 2026	CAM	(England) George Earthy	(England) Reading	Undisclosed	
28 August 2026	LB	(Senegal) El Hadji Malick Diouf	(England) Brentford	£35,000,000 (Note: A potential further £5,000,000 in add-ons.)	
28 August 2026	CM	(England) James Ward-Prowse	(England) Southampton	Undisclosed	

=== Loaned in ===
Date	Pos.	Player	From	Loaned until	Ref.
19 August 2026	CF	(Suriname) Joël Piroe	(England) Leeds United	End of Season (Note: Obligation to make the move permanent)	
21 August 2026	CAM	(England) Divine Mukasa	(England) Manchester City	End of Season	
1 September 2026	CB	(Brazil) Morato	(England) Nottingham Forest	End of Season	
2 September 2026	LB	(Spain) Adama Boiro	(Spain) Athletic Bilbao	End of Season (Note: Option to make the move permanent.)	

=== Loaned out ===
Date	Pos.	Player	To	Loaned until	Ref.
3 July 2026	CB	(Greece) Rayan Oyebade	(England) Southend United	End of Season	
6 July 2026	GK	(England) Mason Terry	(England) Port Vale	1 September 2026 (Note: Terry's season-long loan from West Ham United was cut short due to a hand injury.)	
18 August 2026	CF	(Germany) Niclas Füllkrug	(Germany) Werder Bremen	End of Season	
21 August 2026	RB	(Democratic Republic of the Congo) Aaron Wan-Bissaka	(England) Aston Villa	End of Season	
24 August 2026	CB	(England) Luis Brown	(England) Braintree Town	2 January 2027	
1 September 2026	CB	(England) Kaelan Casey	(England) Stevenage	End of Season	
1 September 2026	CB	(France) Jean-Clair Todibo	(France) Lens	End of Season	
3 September 2026	CF	(Scotland) Josh Landers	(Scotland) Ayr United	End of Season	
14 September 2026	RB	(England) Ryan Battrum	(England) Southend United	12 October 2026	
14 September 2026	CM	(England) Preston Fearon	(England) Forest Green Rovers	12 October 2026	
18 September 2026	GK	(England) Tommy Goodger	(England) Brentwood Town	17 October 2026	
9 October 2026	LB	(England) Regan Clayton	(England) Scunthorpe United	13 December 2026 (Note: On 11 November, Clayton's initial one-month loan at Scunthorpe United was extended by a further five weeks.)	
13 November 2026	CF	(Scotland) Daniel Cummings	(England) Aldershot Town	13 December 2026	
13 November 2026	GK	(England) Mason Terry	(England) Yeovil Town	13 December 2026	

=== Released / out of contract ===
Date	Pos.	Player	Subsequent club	Joined date	Ref.
30 June 2026	GK	(Poland) Łukasz Fabiański	Retired		
30 June 2026	CB	(Northern Ireland) Michael Forbes	(Scotland) Dundee United	1 July 2026	
30 June 2026	GK	(England) Tom Wooster	(England) Walsall	18 August 2026	
30 June 2026	RW	(Spain) Adama Traoré	(Spain) Deportivo La Coruña	26 August 2026	
30 June 2026	CM	(England) Tyron Akpata			
30 June 2026	CF	(England) David Chigwada	(England) Brentford	August 2026	
30 June 2026	CAM	(England) Daniel Rigge			
30 June 2026	CM	(England) Jonathan Unwin	(England) Huddersfield Town	September 2026	

=== New contract ===
Date	Pos.	Player	Contracted until	Ref.
15 July 2026	CM	(England) Connor Brooks	30 June 2028 (Note: Option to extend for a further year)	
4 September 2026	CM	(Wales) Isaac Thomas	Undisclosed (Note: First professional contract)	
7 September 2026	CF	(England) Frankie Day	Undisclosed	
1 October 2026	CB	(England) Harry Montague	Undisclosed	
13 October 2026	CDM	(Czech Republic) Tomáš Souček	30 June 2028	
1 November 2026	CB	(England) Reon Smith	Undisclosed	

== Pre-season and friendlies ==
On 12 June, The Hammers announced two pre-season friendlies against Southend United and Stevenage. A week later, a trip to Scotland to face Rangers was confirmed. A trip to Germany to face 1. FC Magdeburg was next added to the schedule.

Win Draw Loss Fixtures

14 July 2026 Friendly	West Ham United	3–2	Colchester United	Romford
14:00 GMT	Füllkrug; Cornet; Pablo	Report	Payne; Raggett	Stadium: Rush Green Training Ground; Attendance: 0 (BCD)

18 July 2026 Friendly	Southend United	1−1	West Ham United	Southend-on-Sea
15:00 BST	Cardwell 15' (pen.)	Report	Mavropanos 45+1'	Stadium: Roots Hall; Attendance: 10,462; Referee: Ayrton Hursey

22 July 2026 Friendly	Stevenage	0–5	West Ham United	Stevenage
19:45 BST		Report	Ward-Prowse 13'; Castellanos 24'; Orford 68'; Ajala 78'; Murphy 90'	Stadium: Lamex Stadium; Referee: Tim Robinson

26 July 2026 Friendly	Rangers	0−0	West Ham United	Glasgow, Scotland
16:00 BST		Report		Stadium: Ibrox Stadium; Attendance: 48,178; Referee: Don Robertson

1 August 2026 Friendly	1. FC Magdeburg	1–1	West Ham United	Magdeburg, Germany
14:30 CEST	García MacNulty (yellow card) 82'; Michel (yellow card) 83', (goal) 90'	Report	Kilman 21'; Castellanos (yellow card) 66'	Stadium: Avnet Arena; Attendance: 13,279; Referee: Eric Weisbach

2 October 2026 Friendly	West Ham United	2–0	Wycombe Wanderers	Romford
13:00 BST	Souček (pen.); Piroe	Report		Stadium: Rush Green Training Ground; Attendance: 0 (BCD)

== Competitions ==
=== Overall record ===
Competition	First match	Last match	Starting round	Final position	Record							
Competition	First match	Last match	Starting round	Final position	Pld	W	D	L	GF	GA	GD	Win %
EFL Championship	16 August 2026	1 May 2027	Matchday 1	To be decided	16	6	6	4	38	24	+14	37.50
FA Cup	January 2027	To be decided	Third round	To be decided	0	0	0	0	0	0	+0	—
EFL Cup	8 August 2026	15 September 2026	First round	Third round	3	2	0	1	9	5	+4	66.67
Total					19	8	6	5	47	29	+18	42.11

Last updated: 4 November 2026
Source: Soccerway

=== EFL Championship ===
==== League table ====
Pos	Team	Pld	W	D	L	GF	GA	GD	Pts	Promotion, qualification or relegation
8	Swansea City	16	8	3	5	24	20	+4	27	Qualification for Championship play-off quarter-finals
9	Sheffield United	16	7	4	5	25	19	+6	25	
10	West Ham United	16	6	6	4	38	24	+14	24	
11	Norwich City	16	8	0	8	34	25	+9	24	
12	Portsmouth	16	6	5	5	21	19	+2	23	

Updated to match(es) played on 21 November 2026. Source: EFL Official Website
Rules for classification: 1) Points; 2) Goal difference; 3) Number of goals scored; 4) Head-to-head results; 5) Wins; 6) Away goals; 7) Penalty points (sec 9.5); 8) Number of 12-point sending off offences; 9) Play-off (only if needed to determine promotion/relegation)

==== Results summary ====
Overall								Home						Away					
Pld	W	D	L	GF	GA	GD	Pts	W	D	L	GF	GA	GD	W	D	L	GF	GA	GD
16	6	6	4	38	24	+14	24	3	2	3	19	12	+7	3	4	1	19	12	+7

Last updated: 21 November 2026.
Source: Soccerway

==== Results by round ====
Round	1	2	3	4	5	6	7	8	9	10	11	12	13	14	15	16	17	18	19	20	21	22	23	24	25	26	27	28	29	30	31	32	33	34	35	36	37	38	39	40	41	42	43	44	45	46
Ground	A	H	A	H	H	A	H	A	H	A	A	H	H	A	A	H	A	H	A	H	H	A	H	A	A	H	A	H	H	A	A	H	H	A	A	H	A	H	A	H	H	A	H	A	A	H
Result	D	L	D	W	W	W	W	D	D	W	W	L	L	D	L	D																														
Position	10	16	19	12	8	2	1	2	3	3	2	3	8	8	9	10																														
Points	1	1	2	5	8	11	14	15	16	19	22	22	22	23	23	24																														

Source: Soccerway
A = Away; H = Home; W = Win; D = Draw; L = Loss

==== Matches ====
The EFL Championship fixtures were released on 25 June 2026.

Win Draw Loss Fixtures

16 August 2026 1	Burnley	2–2	West Ham United	Burnley
16:00 BST	Flemming 83' (pen.), 90+2', (yellow card) 84'	Report	Kilman 10'; Kanté (yellow card) 33'; Castellanos (yellow card) 67'; Solomon 72'; Hermansen (yellow card) 84'; Diouf (yellow card) 90+5'	Stadium: Turf Moor; Attendance: 20,229 (2,000 away); Referee: Josh Smith

22 August 2026 2	West Ham United	1–2	Charlton Athletic	Stratford
15:00 BST	Kilman (yellow card) 47'; Piroe 74'; Castellanos (yellow card) 81', (penalty missed) 90+3'	Report	Jones 7', (yellow card) 90+3'; McNamara (yellow card) 50'; Campbell 56'; Grant (yellow card) 72'	Stadium: London Stadium; Attendance: 62,264 (3,001 away); Referee: Andrew Kitchen

29 August 2026 3	Watford	1–1	West Ham United	Watford
15:00 BST	Bove (yellow card) 7'; Nabizada 19'; Maamma (yellow card) 24'; Keben (yellow card) 49'	Report	Pollock 27' (o.g.); Veltman (yellow card) 31'	Stadium: Vicarage Road; Attendance: 20,976 (2,246 away); Referee: Bobby Madley

1 September 2026 4	West Ham United	4–2	Wolverhampton Wanderers	Stratford
19:45 BST	Mukasa 33', 53', (yellow card) 45'; Bowen 42' (pen.); Mavropanos 64'; Castellanos (yellow card) 90'	Report	Munetsi 44'; Mavropanos 69' (o.g.); James (yellow card) 87'	Stadium: London Stadium; Attendance: 59,113 (2,941 away); Referee: Lewis Smith

5 September 2026 5	West Ham United	3–0	Derby County	Stratford
15:00 BST	Piroe 6'; Austbø 87'; Kanté 90+5'	Report	Mowatt (yellow card) 21'; Fuseini (yellow card) 77'	Stadium: London Stadium; Attendance: 61,180 (3,001 away); Referee: Oliver Langford

8 September 2026 6	Bolton Wanderers	2–3	West Ham United	Bolton
20:00 BST	Erhahon 18'; Rodrigues 27' (pen.)	Report	Scarles (yellow card) 7'; Bowen 13', 77'; Mavropanos 31', (yellow card) 62'	Stadium: Toughsheet Community Stadium; Attendance: 25,510 (4,646 away); Referee: David Webb
Note: Fixture was initially scheduled for a 19:45 kick-off, but was moved for live Sky Sports broadcast.

11 September 2026 7	West Ham United	6–0	Wrexham	Stratford
20:00 BST	Bowen 28'; Piroe 37'; Mavropanos 48'; Castellanos 63'; Kanté 76'; Solomon 82'; Scarles (yellow card) 90+4'	Report		Stadium: London Stadium; Attendance: 59,712 (2,110 away); Referee: Sam Barrott
Note: Fixture was initially scheduled for 12 September, but was rescheduled for live Sky Sports broadcast.

19 September 2026 8	Millwall	2–2	West Ham United	Bermondsey
12:30 BST	Taylor 16'; Neghli 45+3'; Lisbie (yellow card) 90+6'	Report	Morato (yellow card) 40'; Kanté 74', (red card) 89'; Mavropanos 80', (yellow card) 90+5'; Pablo (yellow card) 83'; Kilman (yellow card) 86'	Stadium: The Den; Attendance: 19,639 (1,774 away); Referee: Paul Tierney
Note: Fixture was initially scheduled for a 15:00 kick-off, but was moved for live Sky Sports broadcast.

9 October 2026 9	West Ham United	1–1	Queens Park Rangers	Stratford
20:00 BST	Engels (yellow card) 17'; Kilman (yellow card) 62'; Morato (yellow card) 65'; Bowen 70', (penalty missed) 90+2'	Report	Madsen 18' (pen.); Kemper (yellow card) 24'; Kamara (yellow card) 62'; Mbengue (yellow card) 90'; Kone (yellow card) 90+1'	Stadium: London Stadium; Attendance: 62,140 (3,001 away); Referee: Ruebyn Ricardo
Note: Fixture was initially scheduled for 10 October, but was brought forward to the night prior for live Sky Sports broadcasting.

14 October 2026 10	Lincoln City	0–6	West Ham United	Lincoln
20:00 BST	Hamer (red card) 3'; McGrandles (red card) 23'	Report	Mavropanos 45', (yellow card) 51'; Austbø 48'; Bowen 50'; Pablo 75', (yellow card) 90+1'; Souček 79', 89'	Stadium: Sincil Bank; Attendance: 10,605 (1,311 away); Referee: Andrew Kitchen
Note: Fixture was initially scheduled for a 19:45 kick-off, but was pushed back for live Sky Sports broadcasting.

17 October 2026 11	Swansea City	0–1	West Ham United	Swansea
15:00 BST		Report	Mukasa 34', (yellow card) 41'; Castellanos (yellow card) 81'	Stadium: Swansea.com Stadium; Attendance: 20,973 (1,971 away); Referee: Josh Smith

24 October 2026 12	West Ham United	2–3	Southampton	Stratford
15:00 BST	Solomon (yellow card) 18'; Walker-Peters 24'; Souček 90+3'	Report	Matsuki 2'; Bree 11'; Dobbin 34', (yellow card) 78'; Jander (yellow card) 51'	Stadium: London Stadium; Attendance: 62,250 (3,001 away); Referee: Michael Salisbury

31 October 2026 13	West Ham United	1–3	West Bromwich Albion	Stratford
15:00 GMT	Kilman (yellow card) 17'; Bowen 29'; Walker-Peters (yellow card) 66'; Engels (yellow card) 85'	Report	Myhre 20'; Morgan 48'; Styles 72'; Molumby (yellow card) 89'	Stadium: London Stadium; Attendance: 61,125 (3,001 away); Referee: Robert Jones

4 November 2026 14	Cardiff City	3–3	West Ham United	Cardiff
19:45 GMT	Moylan 11', 37' (pen.), 39'	Report	Kilman (yellow card) 23', (goal) 82'; Magassa (yellow card) 25'; Mukasa 58'; Engels 65'; Veltman (yellow card) 84'	Stadium: Cardiff City Stadium; Attendance: 24,902 (3,219 away); Referee: Edward Duckworth

7 November 2026 15	Blackburn Rovers	2–1	West Ham United	Blackburn
15:00 GMT	Beyuku (yellow card) 34'; Guðjohnsen 54'; Montgomery (yellow card) 67'; Afolayan 71'; Kargbo (yellow card) 87'	Report	Kliman (yellow card) 72'; Piroe 82'; Engels (yellow card) 86'	Stadium: Ewood Park; Attendance: 20,471 (7,093 away); Referee: Thomas Kirk

21 November 2026 16	West Ham United	1–1	Preston North End	Stratford
15:00 GMT	Mavropanos 60'; Mayers (yellow card) 75'; Piroe (yellow card) 83'	Report	Lindsay 18'; Lang (yellow card) 29'; Mills (yellow card) 35'; Small (yellow card) 45+1'	Stadium: London Stadium; Attendance: 60,525 (3,001 away); Referee: Will Finnie

24 November 2026 17	Portsmouth	v	West Ham United	Portsmouth
19:45 GMT		Report		Stadium: Fratton Park

28 November 2026 18	West Ham United	v	Stoke City	Stratford
15:00 GMT		Report		Stadium: London Stadium

4 December 2026 19	Sheffield United	v	West Ham United	Sheffield
20:00 GMT		Report		Stadium: Bramall Lane
Note: Fixture was initially scheduled for 5 December, but was brought forward to the night prior for live Sky Sports broadcasting.

8 December 2026 20	West Ham United	v	Middlesbrough	Stratford
20:00 GMT		Report		Stadium: London Stadium
Note: Fixture was initially scheduled for a 19:45 kick-off, but was pushed back for live Sky Sports broadcasting.

12 December 2026 21	West Ham United	v	Bristol City	Stratford
15:00 GMT		Report		Stadium: London Stadium

19 December 2026 22	Birmingham City	v	West Ham United	Birmingham
12:30 GMT		Report		Stadium: St. Andrew's @ Knighthead Park
Note: Fixture was initially scheduled for a 15:00 kick-off, but was brought forward for live Sky Sports broadcasting.

26 December 2026 23	West Ham United	v	Norwich City	Stratford
15:00 GMT		Report		Stadium: London Stadium

29 December 2026 24	Southampton	v	West Ham United	Southampton
20:15 GMT		Report		Stadium: St Mary's Stadium
Note: Fixture was initially scheduled for a 19:45 kick-off, but was pushed back for live Sky Sports broadcasting.

1 January 2027 25	Bristol City	v	West Ham United	Bristol
15:00 GMT		Report		Stadium: Ashton Gate

15 January 2027 26	West Ham United	v	Swansea City	Stratford
20:00 GMT		Report		Stadium: London Stadium
Note: Fixture was initially scheduled for 16 January, but was brought forward to the night prior for live Sky Sports broadcasting.

23 January 2027 27	West Bromwich Albion	v	West Ham United	West Bromwich
12:30 GMT		Report		Stadium: The Hawthorns
Note: Fixture was initially scheduled for a 15:00 kick-off, but was brought forward for live Sky Sports broadcasting.

27 January 2027 28	West Ham United	v	Cardiff City	Stratford
19:45 GMT		Report		Stadium: London Stadium

30 January 2027 29	West Ham United	v	Blackburn Rovers	Stratford
15:00 GMT		Report		Stadium: London Stadium

6 February 2027 30	Preston North End	v	West Ham United	Preston
15:00 GMT		Report		Stadium: Deepdale

13 February 2027 31	Wrexham	v	West Ham United	Wrexham
15:00 GMT		Report		Stadium: Racecourse Ground

16 February 2027 32	West Ham United	v	Lincoln City	Stratford
19:45 GMT		Report		Stadium: London Stadium

20 February 2027 33	West Ham United	v	Millwall	Stratford
15:00 GMT		Report		Stadium: London Stadium
Note: Fixture was initially scheduled for 20 February, but was pushed back a day for live Sky Sports broadcasting.

27 February 2027 34	Queens Park Rangers	v	West Ham United	Shepherd's Bush
12:30 GMT		Report		Stadium: Loftus Road
Note: Fixture was initially scheduled for a 15:00 kick-off, but was brought forward for live Sky Sports broadcasting.

2 March 2027 35	Charlton Athletic	v	West Ham United	Charlton
19:45 GMT		Report		Stadium: The Valley

6 March 2027 36	West Ham United	v	Burnley	Stratford
15:00 GMT		Report		Stadium: London Stadium

13 March 2027 37	Stoke City	v	West Ham United	Stoke-on-Trent
15:00 GMT		Report		Stadium: bet365 Stadium

17 March 2027 38	West Ham United	v	Sheffield United	Stratford
19:45 GMT		Report		Stadium: London Stadium

20 March 2027 39	Norwich City	v	West Ham United	Norwich
15:00 GMT		Report		Stadium: Carrow Road

3 April 2027 40	West Ham United	v	Birmingham City	Stratford
15:00 BST		Report		Stadium: London Stadium

6 April 2027 41	West Ham United	v	Bolton Wanderers	Stratford
19:45 BST		Report		Stadium: London Stadium

10 April 2027 42	Derby County	v	West Ham United	Derby
15:00 GMT		Report		Stadium: Pride Park Stadium

17 April 2027 43	West Ham United	v	Watford	Stratford
15:00 BST		Report		Stadium: London Stadium

20 April 2027 44	Wolverhampton Wanderers	v	West Ham United	Wolverhampton
19:45 GMT		Report		Stadium: Molineux Stadium

24 April 2027 45	Middlesbrough	v	West Ham United	Middlesbrough
15:00 GMT		Report		Stadium: Riverside Stadium

1 May 2027 46	West Ham United	v	Portsmouth	Stratford
12:30 BST		Report		Stadium: London Stadium

=== FA Cup ===
As an EFL Championship team, West Ham will enter the FA Cup in the third round. Fixtures are yet to be confirmed.

Win Draw Loss Fixtures

=== EFL Cup ===
West Ham were drawn at home against Portsmouth in the first round, away to Southampton and home to Fulham in the third round.

Win Draw Loss Fixtures

8 August 2026 First round	West Ham United	3–1	Portsmouth	Stratford
15:00 BST	Castellanos 43', 50'; Bowen 45'; Álvarez (yellow card) 54'	Report	Segečić 33', (yellow card) 86'; Adams (yellow card) 88'	Stadium: London Stadium; Attendance: 53,369 (9,000 away); Referee: Adam Herczeg

25 August 2026 Second round	Southampton	1–4	West Ham United	Southampton
19:45 BST	Scienza 10', (yellow card) 34'; Bragg (yellow card) 26'	Report	Ajala 41', 53'; Castellanos 75'; Bowen 84'	Stadium: St Mary's Stadium; Attendance: 15,867 (3,008 away); Referee: Ruebyn Ricardo

15 September 2026 Third round	West Ham United	2–3	Fulham	Stratford
19:45 BST	Morato 16'; Pablo 45+2'	Report	Muniz 13'; Palacios 37'; Smith Rowe (yellow card) 68'; Bobb 78'	Stadium: London Stadium; Attendance: 41,808 (3,500 away); Referee: Gavin Ward

== Statistics ==
=== Appearances and goals ===
As of match played 7 November 2026

Players with no appearances are not included on the list; italics indicate loaned in player

No.	Pos	Nat	Player	Total		Championship		FA Cup		EFL Cup	
No.	Pos	Nat	Player	Apps	Goals	Apps	Goals	Apps	Goals	Apps	Goals
1	GK	(Denmark) DEN	Mads Hermansen	16	0	15	0	0	0	1	0
2	DF	(England) ENG	Kyle Walker-Peters	13	1	9+2	1	0	0	2	0
3	DF	(England) ENG	Maximilian Kilman	18	2	15	2	0	0	3	0
4	MF	(Mexico) MEX	Edson Álvarez	1	0	0	0	0	0	1	0
5	DF	(Brazil) BRA	Morato	11	1	8+2	0	0	0	1	1
7	MF	(Belgium) BEL	Arne Engels	16	1	14	1	0	0	1+1	0
9	FW	(Suriname) SUR	Joël Piroe	15	4	7+6	4	0	0	1+1	0
10	FW	(Israel) ISR	Manor Solomon	17	2	12+3	2	0	0	0+2	0
11	FW	(Argentina) ARG	Taty Castellanos	17	4	9+5	1	0	0	1+2	3
14	FW	(England) ENG	Divine Mukasa	15	4	11+2	4	0	0	2	0
15	DF	(Greece) GRE	Konstantinos Mavropanos	15	5	13	5	0	0	2	0
17	MF	(France) FRA	Mohamadou Kanté	17	3	9+5	3	0	0	3	0
18	DF	(Spain) ESP	Adama Boiro	1	0	0+1	0	0	0	0	0
19	FW	(Brazil) BRA	Pablo	11	2	6+3	1	0	0	2	1
20	FW	(England) ENG	Jarrod Bowen	18	9	15	7	0	0	1+2	2
21	MF	(Venezuela) VEN	Keiber Lamadrid	2	0	0+1	0	0	0	1	0
27	MF	(France) FRA	Soungoutou Magassa	1	0	1	0	0	0	0	0
28	MF	(Czech Republic) CZE	Tomáš Souček	7	3	1+6	3	0	0	0	0
30	DF	(England) ENG	Ollie Scarles	10	0	5+3	0	0	0	1+1	0
34	DF	(Netherlands) NED	Joël Veltman	14	0	7+5	0	0	0	1+1	0
35	FW	(Norway) NOR	Edvin Austbø	11	2	3+8	2	0	0	0	0
49	GK	(England) ENG	Finlay Herrick	2	0	0	0	0	0	2	0
58	DF	(England) ENG	Airidas Golambeckis	4	0	2+1	0	0	0	1	0
61	MF	(England) ENG	Lewis Orford	12	0	1+8	0	0	0	3	0
63	DF	(England) ENG	Ezra Mayers	3	0	1+1	0	0	0	1	0
66	FW	(England) ENG	Joshua Ajala	4	2	0+1	0	0	0	2+1	2
Players who featured but departed the club on loan during the season:
42	DF	(England) ENG	Kaelan Casey	1	0	0	0	0	0	0+1	0
Players who featured but departed the club permanently during the season:
8	MF	(England) ENG	James Ward-Prowse	2	0	0+1	0	0	0	0+1	0
12	DF	(Senegal) SEN	El Hadji Malick Diouf	2	0	0+1	0	0	0	0+1	0

=== Goalscorers ===
As of match played 7 November 2026

Rank	Pos.	No.	Nat.	Player	Championship	FA Cup	EFL Cup	Total
1	FW	20	(England)	Jarrod Bowen	7	0	2	9
2	DF	15	(Greece)	Konstantinos Mavropanos	5	0	0	5
3	FW	9	(Suriname)	Joël Piroe	4	0	0	4
3	FW	11	(Argentina)	Taty Castellanos	1	0	3	4
3	MF	14	(England)	Divine Mukasa	4	0	0	4
5	MF	17	(France)	Mohamadou Kanté	3	0	0	3
5	MF	28	(Czech Republic)	Tomáš Souček	3	0	0	3
5	DF	3	(England)	Maximilian Kilman	2	0	0	2
5	FW	10	(Israel)	Manor Solomon	2	0	0	2
5	FW	19	(Brazil)	Pablo	1	0	1	2
5	FW	35	(Norway)	Edvin Austbø	2	0	0	2
5	FW	66	(England)	Joshua Ajala	0	0	2	2
6	DF	2	(England)	Kyle Walker-Peters	1	0	0	1
6	DF	5	(Brazil)	Morato	0	0	1	1
6	MF	7	(Belgium)	Arne Engels	1	0	0	1
6	Own goals				1	0	0	1
Totals					37	0	9	46

=== Discipline ===
As of match played 7 November 2026

No.	Pos.	Nat.	Player	Championship			FA Cup			EFL Cup			Total		
No.	Pos.	Nat.	Player	Yellow card	(yellow card) (yellow-red card)	Red card	Yellow card	(yellow card) (yellow-red card)	Red card	Yellow card	(yellow card) (yellow-red card)	Red card	Yellow card	(yellow card) (yellow-red card)	Red card
1	GK	(Denmark)	Mads Hermansen	1	0	0	0	0	0	0	0	0	1	0	0
2	DF	(England)	Kyle Walker-Peters	1	0	0	0	0	0	0	0	0	1	0	0
3	DF	(England)	Maximilian Kilman	6	0	0	0	0	0	0	0	0	6	0	0
4	DF	(Mexico)	Edson Álvarez	0	0	0	0	0	0	1	0	0	1	0	0
5	DF	(Brazil)	Morato	2	0	0	0	0	0	0	0	0	2	0	0
7	MF	(Belgium)	Arne Engels	3	0	0	0	0	0	0	0	0	3	0	0
10	FW	(Israel)	Manor Solomon	1	0	0	0	0	0	0	0	0	1	0	0
11	FW	(Argentina)	Taty Castellanos	4	0	0	0	0	0	0	0	0	4	0	0
12	DF	(Senegal)	El Hadji Malick Diouf	1	0	0	0	0	0	0	0	0	1	0	0
14	MF	(England)	Divine Mukasa	2	0	0	0	0	0	0	0	0	2	0	0
15	DF	(Greece)	Konstantinos Mavropanos	3	0	0	0	0	0	0	0	0	3	0	0
17	MF	(France)	Mohamadou Kanté	1	0	1	0	0	0	0	0	0	1	0	1
19	FW	(Brazil)	Pablo	2	0	0	0	0	0	0	0	0	2	0	0
27	MF	(France)	Soungoutou Magassa	1	0	0	0	0	0	0	0	0	1	0	0
30	DF	(England)	Ollie Scarles	2	0	0	0	0	0	0	0	0	2	0	0
34	DF	(Netherlands)	Joël Veltman	2	0	0	0	0	0	0	0	0	2	0	0
Totals				32	0	1	0	0	0	1	0	0	33	0	1

=== Clean sheets ===
As of match played 7 November 2026

The list is sorted by shirt number when total clean sheets are equal.

Rank	No.	Nat	Player	Championship	FA Cup	EFL Cup	Total
1	1	(Denmark)	Mads Hermansen	4	0	0	4
Totals				4	0	0	4

== Awards ==
=== Player awards ===
==== EFL Championship Player of the Month ====
Month	Player	Result	Ref.
September	(Greece) Konstantinos Mavropanos	Won	

==== EFL Championship Goal of the Month ====
Month	Player	Opponent	Result	Ref.
September	(England) Divine Mukasa	v. Wolverhampton Wanderers	Nominated	

=== Manager awards ===
==== EFL Championship Manager of the Month ====
Month	Manager	Result	Ref.
September	(Portugal) Nuno Espírito Santo	Won	
