= Orford =

Orford may refer to:

== Places ==
- Orford, Cheshire, a suburb of Warrington, England
- Orford, Suffolk, England
  - Orford Castle
  - Orford Ness
  - Orford (UK Parliament constituency)
- Orford, Quebec, in the Eastern Townships of Quebec, Canada
  - Mont Orford, a ski resort in Quebec, Canada
  - Orford (electoral district)
- Orford, Ontario, a township in Kent County
- Orford, New Hampshire, United States
- Port Orford, Oregon, United States
- Orford, Tasmania, Australia
- Orford, Victoria, Australia

== Other uses ==
- Orford Copper Company, forerunner of Vale Limited
- Orford (painting), an 1833 landscape painting by Clarkson Stanfield
- Orford (surname)
- Earl of Orford, a title in the Peerage of England, including most notably:
  - Edward Russell, 1st Earl of Orford (1653–1727), English naval officer and First Lord of the Admiralty
  - Robert Walpole, 1st Earl of Orford (1676–1745), first Prime Minister of Great Britain
  - Horace Walpole, 4th Earl of Orford (1717–1797), British politician and writer
