= England national under-20 football team =

National under-20 association football team representing England

England U-20
- Nickname: The Three Lions
- Association: The Football Association (The FA)
- Confederation: UEFA (Europe)
- Head coach: Darren Moore
- FIFA code: ENG
First colours	Second colours

Biggest win
- United Arab Emirates 0–5 England (Johor Bahru, Malaysia; 20 June 1997); Poland 1–5 England (Białystok, Poland; 22 March 2024)

Biggest defeat
- England 0–8 Argentina (Toulon, France; 13 June 2003)

FIFA U-20 World Cup
- Appearances: 11 (first in 1981)
- Best result: Champions (2017)
Medal record
Men's football
FIFA U-20 World Cup
Gold medal – first place	2017 South Korea	Team
Bronze medal – third place	1993 Australia	Team
Under 20 Elite League
Silver medal – second place	2017–18	Team

England national under-20 football team, also known as England Under-20s or England U20(s), represents England in association football at an under-20 age level and is controlled by the Football Association, the governing body for football in England.

England were champions of the FIFA U-20 World Cup, after defeating Venezuela in the final of the 2017 tournament.

From October 2023, the squad was rebranded as the England Men's Elite League Squad to reflect their participation in the Under 20 Elite League. This reverted back to England U20s in August 2025.

== Tournament history ==
=== FIFA U-20 World Cup ===
Year	Round	GP	W	D*	L	GS	GA	Squad
(Tunisia) 1977	did not qualify							
(Japan) 1979	did not qualify							
(Australia) 1981	Fourth place	6	2	2	2	9	7	Squad
(Mexico) 1983	did not qualify							
(Soviet Union) 1985	Group stage	3	0	1	2	2	5	Squad
(Chile) 1987	did not qualify							
(Saudi Arabia) 1989	did not qualify							
(Portugal) 1991	Group stage	3	0	2	1	3	4	Squad
(Australia) 1993	Third place	6	3	2	1	6	4	Squad
(Qatar) 1995	did not qualify							
(Malaysia) 1997	Round of 16	4	3	0	1	9	3	Squad
(Nigeria) 1999	Group stage	3	0	0	3	0	4	Squad
(Argentina) 2001	did not qualify							
(United Arab Emirates) 2003	Group stage	3	0	1	2	0	2	Squad
(Netherlands) 2005	did not qualify							
(Canada) 2007	did not qualify							
(Egypt) 2009	Group stage	3	0	1	2	1	6	Squad
(Colombia) 2011	Round of 16	4	0	3	1	0	1	Squad
(Turkey) 2013	Group stage	3	0	2	1	3	5	Squad
(New Zealand) 2015	did not qualify							
(South Korea) 2017	Champions	7	6	1	0	12	3	Squad
(Poland) 2019	did not qualify							
(Indonesia) ~~2021~~	Cancelled due to the COVID-19 pandemic							
(Argentina) 2023	Round of 16	4	2	1	1	5	4	Squad
(Chile) 2025	did not qualify							
(Azerbaijan) (Uzbekistan) 2027	did not qualify							
(Armenia) (Georgia (country)) 2029	to be determined							
Total	12/26	49	16	16	17	50	48	

== Fixtures and results ==
=== Friendlies ===
14 November 2025	England	1–1	Japan	Eco-Power Stadium, Doncaster
19:30	Lacey 77'	Report	Ishii 90+3'	Attendance: 1,796

27 March 2026	Italy	3–3	England	Riano Athletic Center, Riano, Italy
14:30	Matteo Lavelli 66'; Giacomo Stabile 72'; Dominic Vavassori 89'	Report	Tom Watson 15', 45+1'; Ayden Heaven 58'	Referee: Kevin Bonacina (Italy)

=== 2026–2027 European Elite League ===
25 September 2026	Italy	1–3	England	Estadi Olímpic Camilo Cano, La Nucia
10:30	Golambeckis 66' (o.g.)	Report	Derry 37'; Moore 52'; Lacey 82'

29 September 2026	France	1–2	England	Estadi Olímpic Camilo Cano, La Nucia
10:30	Peter 69'	Report	Mheuka 9'; Moore 14'

3 October 2026	England	2–1	Germany	Estadi Olímpic Camilo Cano, La Nucia
16:30	Mheuka 38'; Noble 48'	Report	Moreira 62'	Attendance: 320

12 November 2026	England	–	Czech Republic	Field Mill, Mansfield
19:30

16 November 2026	Portugal	–	England	Estádio Municipal de Mafra, Mafra, Portugal
16:00

== Players ==
=== Current squad ===
Players born between September 2006 and August 2007 are second-year graduates of the English academy system, players born between September 2007 and August 2008 are first-year graduates. Players born after 1 January 2008 remain eligible to play for England under-19s.

The following players were named in the squad for games against Czech Republic and Portugal, played 12 and 16 November 2026.

Caps and goals correct as of 3 October 2026, after the match against Germany.

No.	Pos.	Player	Date of birth (age)	Caps	Goals	Club
	GK	Oliver Whatmuff	6 November 2007 (age 19)	3	0	(The Football Association) Stockport County (on loan from Manchester City)
	GK	Finlay Herrick	18 January 2006 (age 20)	2	0	(The Football Association) West Ham United
	GK	Nicholas Michalski	14 March 2007 (age 19)	0	0	(The Football Association) Crawley Town (on loan from Blackburn Rovers)
	DF	Ayden Heaven	22 September 2006 (age 20)	6	1	(The Football Association) Manchester United
	DF	Sol Sidibe	10 February 2007 (age 19)	3	0	(Royal Dutch Football Association) PSV
	DF	Harry Amass	16 March 2007 (age 19)	2	0	(The Football Association) Manchester United
	DF	Christian McFarlane	25 January 2007 (age 19)	2	0	(The Football Association) Leicester City (on loan from Manchester City)
	DF	Brooklyn Nfonkeu-Feuba	1 July 2007 (age 19)	2	0	(The Football Association) Manchester City
	DF	Kian Noble	26 February 2007 (age 19)	2	1	(The Football Association) Manchester City
	DF	Airidas Golambeckis	4 November 2007 (age 19)	1	0	(The Football Association) West Ham United
	DF	Olutayo Subuloye	18 December 2007 (age 18)	0	0	(The Football Association) Chelsea
	MF	Jesse Derry	30 June 2007 (age 19)	3	1	(Portuguese Football Federation) Sporting CP (on loan from Chelsea)
	MF	Chris Rigg	18 June 2007 (age 19)	3	0	(The Football Association) Sunderland
	MF	Jack Fletcher	19 March 2007 (age 19)	2	0	(The Football Association) Manchester United
	MF	Jay Robinson	15 March 2007 (age 19)	2	0	(Italian Football Federation) Monza (on loan from Southampton)
	MF	Jim Thwaites	20 December 2007 (age 18)	2	0	(The Football Association) Manchester United
	MF	George Hemmings	4 March 2007 (age 19)	0	0	(The Football Association) Aston Villa
	FW	Shea Lacey	14 April 2007 (age 19)	5	2	(The Football Association) Manchester United
	FW	Shim Mheuka	20 October 2007 (age 19)	3	2	(Scottish Football Association) Celtic (on loan from Chelsea)
	FW	Jimmy-Jay Morgan	21 January 2006 (age 20)	2	0	(The Football Association) West Bromwich Albion
	FW	Ben Broggio	29 January 2007 (age 19)	0	0	(The Football Association) Stevenage (on loan from Aston Villa)
	FW	Brian Madjo	12 January 2009 (age 17)	0	0	(The Football Association) Aston Villa
	FW	Sean Neave	27 May 2007 (age 19)	0	0	(The Football Association) Wolverhampton Wanderers (on loan from Newcastle United)

==== Recent call-ups ====
The following players have previously been called up to the England under-20 squad and remain eligible.

Pos.	Player	Date of birth (age)	Caps	Goals	Club	Latest call-up
GK	Khari Ranson	13 September 2007 (age 19)	0	0	(England) Arsenal	v. Italy, France, Germany, September–October 2026
GK	Sam Proctor	21 December 2006 (age 19)	1	0	(England) Shrewsbury Town (on loan from Aston Villa)	v. Italy, March 2026
GK	Jack Thompson	14 December 2006 (age 19)	0	0	(England) Derby County	v. Italy, March 2026
GK	Elyh Harrison	19 February 2006 (age 20)	2	0	(Scotland) Greenock Morton (on loan from Manchester United)	v. Japan, November 2025
GK	Ted Curd	14 February 2006 (age 20)	0	0	(England) Boreham Wood (on loan from Chelsea)	v. Japan, November 2025
GK	George Pickford	6 February 2007 (age 19)	0	0	(England) Everton	v. Japan, November 2025
GK	Tommy Setford	13 March 2006 (age 20)	1	0	(England) Stevenage (on loan from Arsenal)	v. Switzerland, October 2025
GK	Matty Young	24 November 2006 (age 19)	2	0	(England) Huddersfield Town (on loan from Sunderland)	v. Portugal, Switzerland, 21–24 March 2025
DF	Ezra Mayers	16 January 2007 (age 19)	1	0	(England) West Ham United	v. Italy, France, Germany, September–October 2026
DF	Harrison Murray-Campbell	4 August 2006 (age 20)	4	0	(Belgium) Kortrijk (on loan from Chelsea)	v. Italy, March 2026
DF	Olabade Aluko	30 November 2006 (age 19)	3	0	(England) Leicester City	v. Italy, March 2026
DF	Somto Boniface	11 March 2006 (age 20)	3	0	(England) Leyton Orient (on loan from Ipswich Town)	v. Italy, March 2026
DF	Jayden Meghoma	28 June 2006 (age 20)	3	0	(England) Portsmouth (on loan from Brentford)	v. Italy, March 2026
DF	Zach Abbott	13 May 2006 (age 20)	2	0	(England) Southampton (on loan from Nottingham Forest)	v. Italy, March 2026
DF	Kevin Pinto	23 September 2006 (age 20)	1	0	(Portugal) Benfica	v. Italy, March 2026
DF	Amara Nallo	18 November 2006 (age 19)	1	0	(Finland) HJK (on loan from Liverpool)	v. Japan, November 2025
DF	Triston Rowe	2 October 2006 (age 20)	1	0	(Belgium) Royal Charleroi (on loan from Aston Villa)	v. Japan, November 2025
DF	Lakyle Samuel	6 May 2006 (age 20)	2	0	(England) Exeter City (on loan from Manchester City)	v. Switzerland, October 2025
DF	Mofe Jemide	8 November 2006 (age 20)	1	0	(Portugal) Alverca	v. Switzerland, October 2025
DF	Charlie Tasker	24 February 2006 (age 20)	0	0	(England) Rochdale (on loan from Brighton & Hove Albion)	v. Switzerland, October 2025
DF	Ishé Samuels-Smith	5 June 2006 (age 20)	1	0	(England) Notts County (on loan from Chelsea)	v. Italy, 5 September 2025
MF	Trey Nyoni	30 June 2007 (age 19)	4	0	(England) Liverpool	v. Italy, France, Germany, September–October 2026
MF	Harrison Armstrong	19 January 2007 (age 19)	2	0	(England) Everton	v. Italy, France, Germany, September–October 2026
MF	Divine Mukasa	22 August 2007 (age 19)	1	0	(England) West Ham United (on loan from Manchester City)	v. Italy, France, Germany, September–October 2026
MF	Jamaldeen Jimoh-Aloba	2 October 2006 (age 20)	3	0	(England) Aston Villa	v. Italy, March 2026
MF	Kieran Morgan	17 March 2006 (age 20)	3	0	(England) Bradford City (on loan from Queens Park Rangers)	v. Italy, March 2026
MF	Isaiah Dada-Mascoll	24 May 2006 (age 20)	1	0	(Belgium) Lommel (on loan from Manchester City)	v. Italy, March 2026
MF	Preston Fearon	18 May 2007 (age 19)	1	0	(England) Forest Green Rovers (on loan from West Ham United)	v. Italy, March 2026
MF	Callum Olusesi	11 March 2007 (age 19)	1	0	(England) Tottenham Hotspur	v. Italy, March 2026
MF	Lewis Orford	18 February 2006 (age 20)	3	0	(England) West Ham United	v. Japan, November 2025
MF	Law McCabe	16 January 2006 (age 20)	2	0	(England) Middlesbrough	v. Japan, November 2025
MF	Charlie Gray	22 February 2006 (age 20)	0	0	(England) Wigan Athletic (on loan from Manchester City)	v. Japan, November 2025
MF	Harrison McMahon	29 January 2006 (age 20)	2	0	(England) Chelsea	v. Switzerland, October 2025
MF	Kiano Dyer	21 November 2006 (age 19)	1	0	(England) Chesterfield (on loan from Chelsea)	v. Switzerland, October 2025
FW	Mikey Moore	11 August 2007 (age 19)	3	2	(Germany) 1. FC Köln (on loan from Tottenham Hotspur)	v. Italy, France, Germany, September–October 2026
FW	Andre Harriman-Annous	28 December 2007 (age 18)	2	0	(England) Arsenal	v. Italy, France, Germany, September–October 2026
FW	Joel Ndala	31 May 2006 (age 20)	3	0	(Belgium) Cercle Brugge	v. Italy, March 2026
MF	Joshua Ajala	13 November 2006 (age 19)	2	0	(England) West Ham United	v. Italy, March 2026
FW	Romelle Donovan	30 November 2006 (age 19)	1	0	(England) Sheffield United (on loan from Brentford)	v. Italy, March 2026
FW	Errol Mundle-Smith	19 March 2006 (age 20)	1	0	(England) Norwich City	v. Italy, March 2026
FW	Tommy Watson	8 April 2006 (age 20)	1	2	(England) Leicester City (on loan from Brighton & Hove Albion)	v. Italy, March 2026
FW	Kadan Young	19 January 2006 (age 20)	1	0	(France) Annecy (on loan from Aston Villa)	v. Italy, March 2026
FW	Ethan Wheatley	20 January 2006 (age 20)	3	0	(England) Lincoln City (on loan from Manchester United)	v. Japan, November 2025
FW	Ato Ampah	22 April 2006 (age 20)	2	0	(England) Stoke City	v. Japan, November 2025
FW	Sam Amo-Ameyaw	18 July 2006 (age 20)	1	0	(France) Strasbourg	v. Japan, November 2025
FW	Micah Mbick	8 November 2006 (age 20)	1	0	(England) Charlton Athletic	v. Japan, November 2025
FW	Jayden Danns	16 January 2006 (age 20)	1	1	(England) Liverpool	v. Italy, September 2025
FW	Justin Oboavwoduo	23 August 2006 (age 20)	1	0	(Italy) Juventus	v. Italy, September 2025

- ^{INJ} Player withdrew from the squad before any games had been played.
- ^{SEN} Player withdrew from the squad due to a call-up to the under-21 team.

== Head-to-head record ==
The following table shows England's head-to-head record in the FIFA U-20 World Cup.

Opponent	Pld	W	D	L	GF	GA	GD	Win %
Argentina	4	1	2	1	5	3	+2	25.00
Australia	2	1	1	0	3	2	+1	50.00
Cameroon	2	1	0	1	2	1	+1	50.00
China	1	0	0	1	0	2	−2	0.00
Chile	1	0	1	0	1	1	+0	0.00
Colombia	1	0	1	0	0	0	+0	0.00
Costa Rica	1	1	0	0	2	1	+1	100.00
Egypt	3	1	0	2	4	5	−1	33.33
Ghana	2	0	0	2	1	6	−5	0.00
Guinea	1	0	1	0	1	1	+0	0.00
Iraq	2	0	2	0	2	2	+0	0.00
Italy	2	1	0	1	4	3	+1	50.00
Ivory Coast	1	1	0	0	2	1	+1	100.00
Japan	2	0	0	2	0	3	−3	0.00
Mexico	5	2	2	1	2	1	+1	40.00
Nigeria	1	0	0	1	0	1	−1	0.00
North Korea	1	0	1	0	0	0	+0	0.00
Paraguay	1	0	1	0	2	2	+0	0.00
Qatar	1	0	0	1	1	2	−1	0.00
Romania	1	0	0	1	0	1	−1	0.00
South Korea	2	1	1	0	2	1	+1	50.00
Spain	1	0	0	1	0	1	−1	0.00
Syria	1	0	1	0	3	3	+0	0.00
Tunisia	1	1	0	0	1	0	+1	100.00
Turkey	1	1	0	0	1	0	+1	100.00
United Arab Emirates	1	1	0	0	5	0	+5	100.00
United States	2	1	0	1	1	1	+0	50.00
Uruguay	3	1	1	1	3	3	+0	33.33
Uzbekistan	1	0	1	0	1	1	+0	0.00
Venezuela	1	1	0	0	1	0	+1	100.00
Total	49	16	16	17	50	48	+2	32.65
