= Luke Garrard =

English football manager (born 1985)

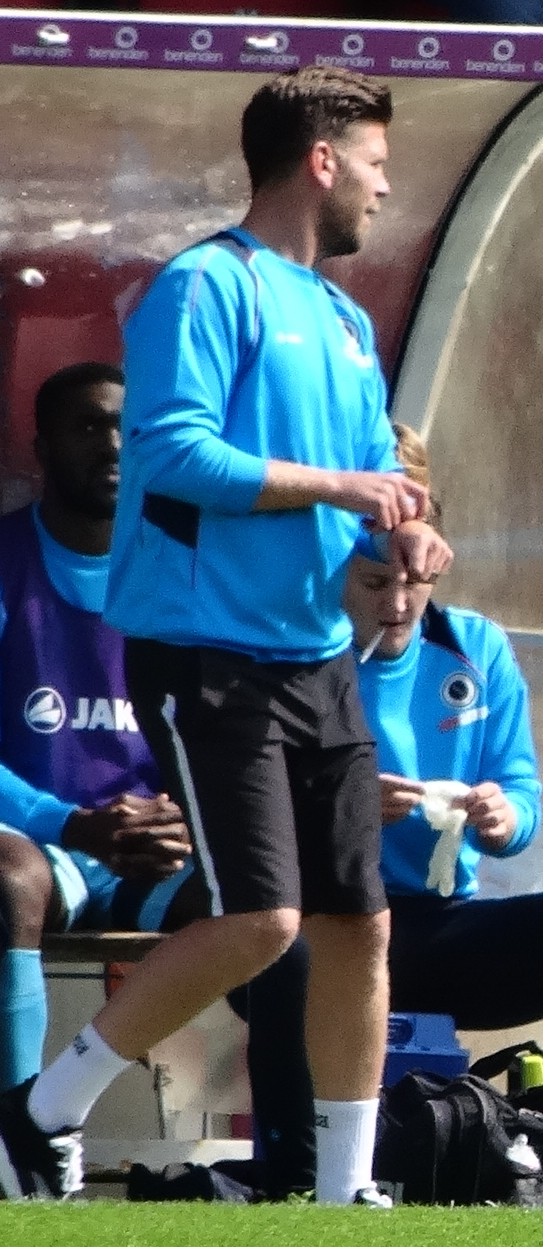
- Garrard as manager of Boreham Wood in 2016

Personal information
- Full name: Luke Garrard
- Date of birth: 22 September 1985 (age 41)
- Place of birth: Barnet, England
- Height: 5 ft 10 in (1.78 m)
- Positions: Defender; midfielder

Team information
- Current team: Boreham Wood (manager)

Youth career
- ?–2002: Tottenham Hotspur

Senior career*
Years	Team	Apps	(Gls)
2002–2005	Swindon Town	11	(0)
2005	Bishop's Stortford		
2005	Boreham Wood		
2005–2006	Northwood		
2006–2010	AFC Wimbledon	98	(5)
2009–2010	→ Boreham Wood (loan)		
2010–2015	Boreham Wood	140	(7)

Managerial career
- 2015–2024: Boreham Wood
- 2024–: Boreham Wood
- * Club domestic league appearances and goals

Luke Garrard (born 22 September 1985) is an English professional football manager and former player who manages National League club Boreham Wood.

== Career ==
Garrard started his career as a trainee at Tottenham Hotspur but was released as a schoolboy. He went on to sign as an apprentice for Swindon Town, making his professional league debut against Oldham Athletic on 26 April 2003. Between 2002 and 2005, Garrard made 17 appearances for Swindon, before being released on 19 April 2005.

Garrard went on to have spells with Bishop's Stortford, Boreham Wood and Northwood, before joining AFC Wimbledon in March 2006.

A popular figure with Wimbledon's fans, he made over 100 appearances for the club, mainly in a right side defensive role, but in November 2008 Garrard picked up an injury during training that kept him out for the rest of that season. From the start of the 2009–10 season, he made only occasional appearances for the team and eventually in January 2010, he was allowed to re-join Boreham Wood after his request for regular first team football could not be guaranteed.

== Coaching career ==
On 14 October 2015, Garrard was appointed as the manager of Boreham Wood, following the resignation of Ian Allinson, making him the youngest manager in England's top five divisions.

In Garrard's third season in charge, he led Boreham Wood to the National League play-offs for the first time. His side defeated AFC Fylde and Sutton United to set up a play-off final with Tranmere Rovers at Wembley Stadium in which Garrard's side were defeated 2–1. Also in this season, Boreham Wood defeated Football League opposition for the first time in their history when they defeated League One side Blackpool in the FA Cup first round.

In the 2021–22 season, Boreham Wood reached the fifth round of the FA Cup for the first time in their history. Having reached the third round, his side defeated League One side AFC Wimbledon 2–0 before winning away at Championship promotion chasers AFC Bournemouth 1–0. His side were eventually defeated 2–0 at Premier League club Everton.

In the 2022–23 season, Boreham Wood reached the play-offs again but lost in the semi-finals to Notts County after a late goal in extra time. On 2 April 2024, following a defeat to Southend United that left relegation-threatened Boreham Wood three points from safety with just four matches remaining, the club announced that they would part company with Garrard following the final match of the season. Following a 0–0 draw with Ebbsfleet United on the final day of the season, Wood's relegation was confirmed.

On 13 September 2024, Garrard returned to Boreham Wood as manager following the sacking of Ross Jenkins. He oversaw an immediate return to the National League, defeating Maidstone United in the play-off final.

During the club's first season back in the National League, they defeated West Ham United U21 in the 2026 National League Cup final. On 10 May 2026, the club were denied a second successive promotion, losing on penalties to Rochdale in the 2026 play-off final following a 2–2 draw in which his side threw away a 2-goal lead, conceding the equaliser in the seventh minute of additional time.

== Managerial Statistics ==
As of match played 20 November 2026

Managerial record by team and tenure
Team	From	To	Record					Ref.
Team	From	To	P	W	D	L	Win %	Ref.
Boreham Wood	12 October 2015	20 April 2024	441	158	139	144	35.8	
Boreham Wood	13 September 2024	Present	132	86	23	23	65.2	
Total			573	244	162	167	42.6	

== Honours ==
=== Player ===
AFC Wimbledon

- Conference South: 2008–09
- Isthmian League Premier Division play-offs: 2008

Individual

- AFC Wimbledon Young Player of the Year: 2006–07

=== Manager ===
Boreham Wood

- National League South play-offs: 2025
- Herts Senior Cup: 2017–18, 2018–19
- National League Cup: 2025–26

Individual

- National League Manager of the Month: December 2020, February 2022,
