= Divine Mukasa =

English footballer (born 2007)

Personal information
- Full name: Divine Tayon Mahogany Mukasa
- Date of birth: 22 August 2007 (age 19)
- Place of birth: Newham, England
- Height: 5 ft 11 in (1.80 m)
- Positions: Forward; attacking midfielder

Team information
- Current team: West Ham United
- Number: 14

Youth career
- 2013–2023: West Ham United
- 2023–2025: Manchester City

Senior career*
Years	Team	Apps	(Gls)
2025–	Manchester City	2	(0)
2026	→ Leicester City (loan)	15	(2)
2026–	→ West Ham United (loan)	14	(4)

International career^{‡}
2022–2023	England U16	9	(3)
2023–2024	England U17	10	(4)
2024–2025	England U18	5	(0)
2025–2026	England U19	11	(3)
2026–	England U20	1	(0)
2026–	England U21	1	(0)
- * Club domestic league appearances and goals as of 21 November 2026 (UTC) ‡ National team caps and goals as of 21:02, 10 October 2026 (UTC)

Divine Tayon Mahogany Mukasa (born 22 August 2007) is an English professional footballer who plays as a forward or attacking midfielder for EFL Championship club West Ham United, on loan from Premier League club Manchester City.

== Club career ==
Mukasa first trained at West Ham United at the age of 6, in 2013 but did not sign until the age of 9. After impressing at various youth levels for West Ham United, including U15s, U16s, U18s, and U21s, and playing a key role in their U18s' Premier League (South) title win, Mukasa signed for Manchester City. In August 2025, Mukasa was included in the 22-man squad to face Italian Serie B side Palermo in a Manchester City first team pre-season match.

On 24 September 2025, Mukasa made his senior debut for City starting in a 2–0 away victory over EFL League One side Huddersfield Town in the EFL Cup third round, assisting Phil Foden's opening goal.

On 3 February 2026, Mukasa joined EFL Championship side Leicester City on loan for the remainder of the season.

On 21 August 2026, Mukasa joined EFL Championship side West Ham United on a season-long loan deal, rejoining the team he spent 10 years with as an academy player.

== International career ==
Born to a Lithuanian mother and a Ugandan father in England, Mukasa is eligible to represent the Lithuania, Uganda, and England national teams. At youth level, he has represented England. Mukasa scored his first goal for England in an U16s friendly game on 23 February 2023, in a 3–0 win against Scotland.

In March 2024, Mukasa scored two goals for England U17 in qualifying game against Northern Ireland. He was included in the squad for the 2024 UEFA European Under-17 Championship. Mukasa started all four of their games at the tournament including their quarter-final elimination against Italy.

Mukasa made his U19 debut during a 2–0 win over Ukraine at Pinatar Arena on 3 September 2025.

In June 2024, Mukasa visited Uganda on holiday, and according to Kawowo Sports, the Government of Uganda and Federation of Uganda Football Associations would be keen to make a follow-up with Mukasa.

== Style of play ==
Mukasa has been described by City as a "player who excels in tight spaces and is highly skilled at both scoring and assisting goals", and brings "an added level of creativity" to teams he plays for.

== Career statistics ==
As of match played 31 October 2026

Appearances and goals by club, season and competition
Club	Season	League			FA Cup		EFL Cup		Europe		Other		Total	
Club	Season	Division	Apps	Goals	Apps	Goals	Apps	Goals	Apps	Goals	Apps	Goals	Apps	Goals
Manchester City U21	2024–25	—			—		—		—		2 (Note: Appearances in EFL Trophy)	0	2	0
Manchester City	2025–26	Premier League	2	0	1	0	3	0	0	0	—		6	0
Leicester City (loan)	2025–26	Championship	15	2	1	0	—		—		—		16	2
West Ham United (loan)	2026–27	Championship	11	3	0	0	2	0	—		—		13	3
Career total			28	5	2	0	5	0	0	0	2	0	37	5

== Honours ==
West Ham United U18

- FA Youth Cup: 2022–23

Manchester City U18

- FA Youth Cup: 2023–24
