= Finlay Herrick =

English footballer

Personal information
- Full name: Finlay Jacob Herrick
- Date of birth: 18 January 2006 (age 20)
- Place of birth: Hatfield, England
- Height: 1.87 m (6 ft 2 in)
- Position: Goalkeeper

Team information
- Current team: West Ham United
- Number: 49

Youth career
- 2012–2023: West Ham United

Senior career*
Years	Team	Apps	(Gls)
2023–	West Ham United	1	(0)
2025	→ Boreham Wood (loan)	10	(0)

International career^{‡}
2021	England U16	2	(0)
2022	England U17	2	(0)
2023	England U18	2	(0)
2024	England U19	5	(0)
2025–	England U20	2	(0)
- * Club domestic league appearances and goals as of 17:59, 21 November 2026 (UTC) ‡ National team caps and goals as of 09:59, 06 April 2026 (UTC)

Finlay Jacob Herrick (born 18 January 2006) is an English professional footballer who plays as a goalkeeper for EFL Championship club West Ham United.

== Club career ==
Herrick joined West Ham at the age of six and was a member of the West Ham team that won both the FA Youth Cup and the Professional U18 Development League South in 2022–23. He signed his first professional contract ahead of the 2023–24 season, and extended his contract until the end of the 2027–28 season in October 2024.

=== Boreham Wood (loan) ===
On 1 September 2025, Herrick was loaned to National League side Boreham Wood. He played 10 league games as well as 3 in the National League Cup before being recalled on 29 October 2025 to join up with the first team at West Ham.

=== West Ham United ===
Having made two appearances for West Ham U21s in the 2025–26 EFL Trophy, Herrick made his first team debut for West Ham in the quarter-finals of the 2025–26 FA Cup against Leeds United on 5 April 2026. Replacing Alphonse Areola in the 120th minute, while the score was 2–2, Herrick went on to save Joël Piroe's effort with the first kick of the subsequent penalty shoot-out, which West Ham ultimately lost 2–4.

== International career ==
Herrick has played for England at various youth levels from under-16 to under-20 and was a member of tournament squads at the 2023 FIFA U-17 World Cup and the 2025 UEFA European Under-19 Championship.

== Career statistics ==
As of match played 15 September 2026

Appearances and goals by club, season and competition
Club	Season	League			FA Cup		League Cup		Europe		Other		Total	
Club	Season	Division	Apps	Goals	Apps	Goals	Apps	Goals	Apps	Goals	Apps	Goals	Apps	Goals
West Ham United U21	2024–25	—			—		—		—		2	0	2	0
West Ham United U21	2025–26	—			—		—		—		2	0	2	0
West Ham United U21	Total		—		—		—		—		4	0	4	0
West Ham United	2025–26	Premier League	0	0	1	0	0	0	—		—		1	0
West Ham United	2026–27	Championship	1	0	0	0	2	0	—		—		2	0
Career total			0	0	1	0	2	0	0	0	4	0	8	0
