= Keiber Lamadrid =

Venezuelan footballer (born 2003)

Personal information
- Full name: Keiber Alberto Lamadrid Briceño
- Date of birth: 18 November 2003 (age 22)
- Place of birth: Caracas, Venezuela
- Height: 1.77 m (5 ft 10 in)
- Positions: Left winger; left midfielder

Team information
- Current team: West Ham United
- Number: 21

Youth career
- UNIMET
- Centro Italo Venezolano
- 2014–2021: Deportivo La Guaira

Senior career*
Years	Team	Apps	(Gls)
2022–2026	Deportivo La Guaira	96	(14)
2026	→ West Ham United (loan)	0	(0)
2026–	West Ham United	1	(0)

International career^{‡}
2025–	Venezuela	2	(0)
Medal record
Representing Venezuela
Men's football
FIFA Series
Runner-up	2026 Uzbekistan
- * Club domestic league appearances and goals as of 21:40, 1 September 2026 (UTC) ‡ National team caps and goals as of 18:33, 27 March 2026 (UTC)

Keiber Alberto Lamadrid Briceño (born 18 November 2003) is a Venezuelan footballer who plays as a left midfielder or left winger for EFL Championship club West Ham United, and the Venezuela national team.

== Early life ==
Born in Caracas, Lamadrid began playing at futsal schools in his hometown before switching to football and playing for UNIMET and Centro Italo Venezolano. In 2018, aged 14, he joined the youth categories of Deportivo La Guaira.

== Club career ==
=== Deportivo La Guaira ===
Lamadrid made his first team – and Primera División – on 9 April 2022, coming on as a second-half substitute for fellow youth graduate Jon Aramburu in a 3–2 away loss to Caracas. He scored his first goal on 6 May 2023, netting his side's fifth in a 5–3 home win over Deportivo Rayo Zuliano.

After finishing the 2023 season as a backup option, Lamadrid became a regular starter in the 2024 campaign, displaying his versatility by playing as a left-back or as a central midfielder.

=== West Ham United ===
On 22 January 2026, Lamadrid was loaned to Premier League club West Ham United, until the end of the season. He made his debut for West Ham United U21 team on 2 February, in a Premier League 2 match against Middlesbrough U21 team, scoring his first goal in England for the London club in the 12th minute of the match.

On 14 February 2026, Lamadrid made his professional debut with The Irons in the FA Cup, in a 1–0 victory over Burton Albion. On 20 June 2026, West Ham confirmed that they had made Lamadrid's loan move permanent for an undisclosed fee.

== International career ==
On 7 November 2025, Lamadrid was called up to the Venezuela national team by caretaker manager Fernando Aristeguieta for two friendlies against Australia and Canada. He made his full international debut on 18 November, replacing Alessandro Milani late into a 2–0 loss to the latter at the Chase Stadium in Fort Lauderdale, Florida.

== Career statistics ==
=== Club ===
As of 1 September 2026

Appearances and goals by club, season and competition
Club	Season	League			National cup (Note: Includes Copa Venezuela, FA Cup)		Continental		Total	
Club	Season	Division	Apps	Goals	Apps	Goals	Apps	Goals	Apps	Goals
Deportivo La Guaira	2022	Liga FUTVE	12	0	—		2 (Note: Appearance(s) in Copa Sudamericana)	0	14	0
Deportivo La Guaira	2023	Liga FUTVE	14	1	—		—		14	1
Deportivo La Guaira	2024	Liga FUTVE	37	5	2	0	1	0	40	5
Deportivo La Guaira	2025	Liga FUTVE	33	8	2	0	1	0	36	8
Deportivo La Guaira	Total		96	14	4	0	4	0	104	14
West Ham United (loan)	2025–26	Premier League	0	0	1	0	—		1	0
West Ham United	2026–27	Championship	1	0	1	0	—		2	0
West Ham United	Total		1	0	2	0	0	0	3	0
Career total			97	14	6	0	4	0	107	14

=== International ===
As of 27 March 2026.

Venezuela national team
2025	1	0
2026	1	0
Total	1	0

== Honours ==
Venezuela

- FIFA Series runner-up: 2026
