= Airidas Golambeckis =

English footballer (born 2008)

Personal information
- Full name: Airidas Golambeckis
- Date of birth: 4 November 2007 (age 18)
- Place of birth: East Ham, England
- Position: Defender

Team information
- Current team: West Ham United
- Number: 58

Youth career
- 2013–2025: West Ham United

Senior career*
Years	Team	Apps	(Gls)
2025–	West Ham United	3	(0)

International career^{‡}
2023	Lithuania U16	2	(0)
2024–2025	England U18	9	(1)
2025–2026	England U19	9	(0)
2026–	England U20	1	(0)
- * Club domestic league appearances and goals as of 31 October 2026 (UTC) ‡ National team caps and goals as of 25 September 2026

Airidas Golambeckis (born 4 November 2007) is an English professional footballer who plays as a defender for EFL Championship club West Ham United.

== Early life ==
Born in England to Lithuanian parents, he grew up in London, England. He attended The Sydney Russell School.

== Club career ==
As a youth player, Golambeckis joined the academy of Premier League side West Ham United at the age of eight and debuted for the club's under-21 team at the age of sixteen. In 2025, he helped their under-18 team win the 2024–25 U18 Premier League Cup and was promoted to their senior team.

On 25 August 2026, Golambeckis made his debut for West Ham, playing the full 90 minutes in a 4–1 EFL Cup win against Southampton. Four days later he made his league debut starting their Championship draw against Watford.

== International career ==
Golambeckis is a Lithuania and England youth international. During November 2025, he played for England U19 during 2026 UEFA European Under-19 Championship qualification.

== Style of play ==
Golambeckis plays as a defender. English newspaper The Guardian wrote in 2024 that "his elegant defending and his ease in possession should stand him in good stead given the growing importance of playing out from the back".

Lithuania international Deimantas Bička said in 2024 that he is "exceptional in his understanding of football, reading of situations, and technical level... a center-back, very calm with the ball. He doesn't seem to stand out in terms of physical data, but he is very intellectual".

== Career statistics ==
As of match played 31 October 2026

Appearances and goals by club, season and competition
Club	Season	League			FA Cup		EFL Cup		Other		Total	
Club	Season	Division	Apps	Goals	Apps	Goals	Apps	Goals	Apps	Goals	Apps	Goals
West Ham United	2026–27	Championship	3	0	0	0	1	0	—		4	0
Career total			3	0	0	0	1	0	0	0	4	0
