= Kian Noble =

English footballer (born 2007)

Personal information
- Full name: Kian Ben Noble
- Date of birth: 26 February 2007 (age 19)
- Place of birth: Doncaster, England
- Position: Defender

Team information
- Current team: Manchester City
- Number: 90

Youth career
- Manchester City

International career^{‡}
Years	Team	Apps	(Gls)
2022	England U15	4	(0)
2022–2023	England U16	11	(0)
2023–2024	England U17	12	(0)
2024–2025	England U18	6	(0)
2025–	England U19	10	(0)
- ‡ National team caps and goals as of 12:37, 16 April 2026 (UTC)

Kian Ben Noble (born 26 February 2007) is an English professional footballer who plays as a defender for Manchester City.

== Early life ==
Noble was born on 26 February 2007. Born in Yorkshire, England, he grew up in Doncaster, England.

== Club career ==
As a youth player, Noble joined the youth academy of Premier League side Manchester City, where he played in the UEFA Youth League. In 2024, he helped the club's under-18 team win the 2023–24 FA Youth Cup.

== International career ==
Noble is an England youth international. During May 2024, he played for the England national under-17 football team at the 2024 UEFA European Under-17 Championship.

== Career statistics ==
As of 15 September 2026

Appearances and goals by club, season and competition
Club	Season	League			FA Cup		EFL Cup		Continental		Other		Total	
Club	Season	Division	Apps	Goals	Apps	Goals	Apps	Goals	Apps	Goals	Apps	Goals	Apps	Goals
Manchester City U21	2023–24	—			—		—		—		1 (Note: Appearance(s) in EFL Trophy)	0	1	0
Manchester City U21	2024–25	—			—		—		—		0	0	0	0
Manchester City U21	2025–26	—			—		—		—		2	0	2	0
Manchester City U21	2025–26	—			—		—		—		2	0	2	0
Manchester City U21	Total		—		—		—		—		5	0	5	0
Career Total			0	0	0	0	0	0	0	0	5	0	5	0
