= Ezra Mayers =

English footballer (born 2007)

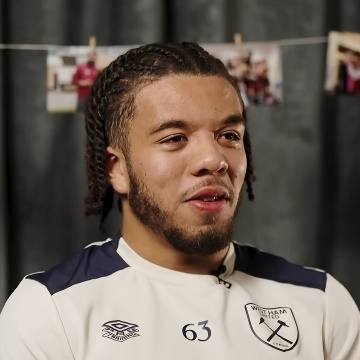
- Mayers with West Ham United in 2026

Personal information
- Full name: Ezra Samuel Korbinian Mayers
- Date of birth: 16 January 2007 (age 19)
- Place of birth: Wanstead, England
- Height: 1.83 m (6 ft 0 in)
- Position: Defender

Team information
- Current team: West Ham United
- Number: 63

Youth career
- Wanstead Athletic
- 2016–2024: West Ham United

Senior career*
Years	Team	Apps	(Gls)
2024–	West Ham United	9	(0)

International career^{‡}
2026–	England U19	3	(1)
- * Club domestic league appearances and goals as of 16:51, 21 November 2026 (UTC) ‡ National team caps and goals as of 02:30, 1 April 2026 (UTC)

Ezra Samuel Korbinian Mayers (born 16 January 2007) is an English professional footballer who plays as a defender for EFL Championship club West Ham United.

== Club career ==
From Wanstead, East London, Mayers began playing grassroots football at local club Wanstead Athletic, before joining West Ham United. On 16 January 2024, his 17th birthday, Mayers signed his first professional contract with West Ham, later featuring in West Ham's matchday squad for the first time, being named on the bench on 30 November 2024 against Arsenal in the Premier League.

On 7 December 2025, Mayers made his debut for West Ham, coming on as an 82nd-minute substitute in a 1–1 Premier League draw against Brighton & Hove Albion.

== International career ==
In March 2026, Mayers scored a goal for England under-19 against Portugal.

== Personal life ==
Born in England, Mayers is of German and Barbadian descent.

== Career statistics ==
As of match played 25 August 2026

Appearances and goals by club, season and competition
Club	Season	League			FA Cup		League Cup		Europe		Other		Total	
Club	Season	Division	Apps	Goals	Apps	Goals	Apps	Goals	Apps	Goals	Apps	Goals	Apps	Goals
West Ham United U21	2024–25	—			—		—		—		3	0	3	0
West Ham United U21	2025–26	—			—		—		—		3	0	3	0
West Ham United U21	West Ham U21 Total		—		—		—		—		6	0	6	0
West Ham United	2025–26	Premier League	6	0	4	0	0	0	—		—		10	0
West Ham United	2026–27	Championship	1	0	0	0	1	0	—		—		2	0
West Ham United	West Ham United Total		7	0	4	0	1	0	0	0	0	0	12	0
Career total			7	0	4	0	1	0	0	0	6	0	18	0

== Honours ==
West Ham United U18

- U18 Premier League Cup: 2024–25

Individual

- West Ham United Dylan Tombides Award: 2023–24
