= Lewis Orford (cricketer) =

English solicitor and cricketer

Lewis Alfred Orford (12 March 1865 – 18 January 1948) was an English solicitor and a cricketer who played in seven first-class cricket matches for Cambridge University in 1886 and 1887. He was born in Cheetham Hill, Manchester and died in Crumpsall, also in Manchester.

The son of a Manchester solicitor with whom he later went into partnership, Orford was educated at Uppingham School and Clare College, Cambridge. He was captain of cricket at Uppingham in 1883. As a cricketer, he was a right-handed batsman and wicketkeeper.

At Cambridge, Orford was brought into the first eleven cricket team late in the university cricket season of 1886 and did well in his first game, against Marylebone Cricket Club at Lord's, as a lower order batsman and wicketkeeper, scoring 29 in his only innings and making five catches and one stumping. In the 1886 University Match against Oxford University which followed this game, he was promoted to open the batting in the second innings. He played more regularly for the first team in 1887 but remained as a lower-order batsman, despite an innings of 76 when batting at No 10 in a high-scoring match against Sussex. The 1887 University Match was his final match in first-class cricket.

Orford had graduated from Cambridge University with a Bachelor of Arts degree in 1886, before his final season for the cricket team. He was admitted as a solicitor in 1890 and practised alongside his father and his older brother in Manchester.
