= Manor Solomon =

Israeli footballer (born 1999)

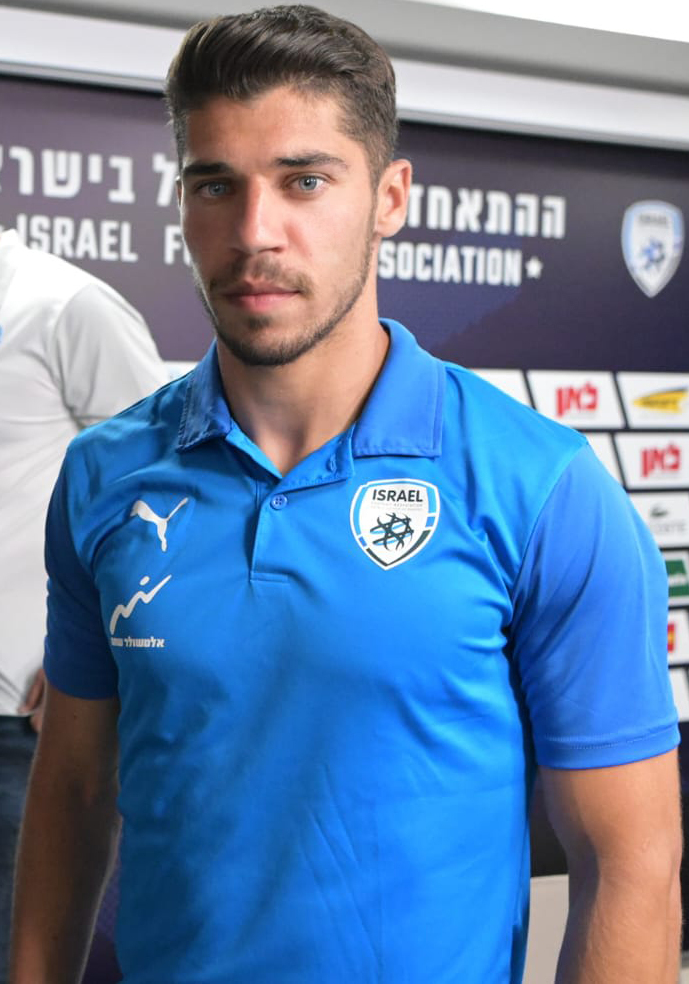
- Solomon with Israel in 2022

Personal information
- Full name: Manor Solomon
- Date of birth: 24 July 1999 (age 27)
- Place of birth: Kfar Saba, Israel
- Height: 1.70 m (5 ft 7 in)
- Position: Winger

Team information
- Current team: West Ham United
- Number: 10

Youth career
- 2007–2008: Hapoel Kfar Saba
- 2008–2017: Maccabi Petah Tikva

Senior career*
Years	Team	Apps	(Gls)
2016–2019	Maccabi Petah Tikva	68	(8)
2019–2023	Shakhtar Donetsk	70	(16)
2022–2023	→ Fulham (loan)	19	(6)
2023–2026	Tottenham Hotspur	5	(0)
2024–2025	→ Leeds United (loan)	39	(10)
2025–2026	→ Villarreal (loan)	6	(1)
2026	→ Fiorentina (loan)	16	(2)
2026–	West Ham United	16	(2)

International career^{‡}
2015	Israel U16	1	(1)
2015–2016	Israel U17	15	(1)
2016	Israel U18	2	(0)
2017	Israel U19	6	(0)
2017–2018	Israel U21	6	(0)
2018–	Israel	53	(8)
- * Club domestic league appearances and goals as of 16:59, 21 November 2026 (UTC) ‡ National team caps and goals as of 21:10, 17 November 2026 (UTC)

Manor Solomon (Hebrew: מנור סולומון; born 24 July 1999) is an Israeli professional footballer who plays as a winger for EFL Championship club West Ham United and the Israel national team.

Solomon began his professional career at Maccabi Petah Tikva in the Israeli Premier League. In January 2019, he transferred to Shakhtar Donetsk for a €6 million fee, and won three Ukrainian Premier League titles. After the Russian invasion of Ukraine, he moved on loan to Fulham of the Premier League, before joining Tottenham on a permanent deal in 2023. He was loaned to Leeds United in 2024, where he won the EFL Championship, Villarreal and Fiorentina before joining West Ham United in August 2026.

Solomon represented Israel from under-16 to under-21 level. In 2018, he made his senior debut for the national team.

== Early and personal life ==
Solomon was born and raised in Kfar Saba, Israel. His parents Ayala and Yossi Solomon are physical education teachers. He is of Ashkenazi Jewish (Hungarian-Jewish) and of both Sephardi Jewish and Mizrahi Jewish (Iraqi-Jewish) descent. His mother and father met while studying together at the Ohalo College, both majored in physical education and minored in maritime studies. As a young married couple, their shared maritime training gave them the idea to choose the unique Hebrew first name Manor for their son, that also means "a boom" in sailing. Solomon was enlisted for mandatory military service in December 2017, and has served in the Israel Defense Forces (IDF).

He also holds a Portuguese passport, on account of his Sephardi Jewish ancestors, which eases the move to certain European football leagues.

He has been in a relationship with Dana Vashina since 2018, and the couple got married in Israel in June 2025. Solomon and his girlfriend at the time were safely evacuated by the Israeli government from Ukraine (as a foreign player of Ukrainian club Shakhtar Donetsk at the time), after the Russian invasion of Ukraine began in February 2022. They were taken to the Polish border.

== Club career ==
=== Maccabi Petah Tikva ===
On 26 November 2016, at the age of 17, Solomon made his senior debut for the Israeli Premier League club Maccabi Petah Tikva, coming on as a 54th-minute substitute against Hapoel Haifa that ended in a 2–1 away loss. On 28 January 2017, Solomon scored his first Israeli Premier League goal a 2–0 home victory against Bnei Yehuda Tel Aviv.

Solomon was named in the "50 for the Future: UEFA.com's Ones to Watch for 2018–19".

=== Shakhtar Donetsk ===
On 11 January 2019, Ukrainian side Shakhtar Donetsk signed 19-year-old Solomon from Maccabi Petah Tikva in a transfer worth an initial €6 million, then the fifth-highest transfer fee for an Israeli footballer.

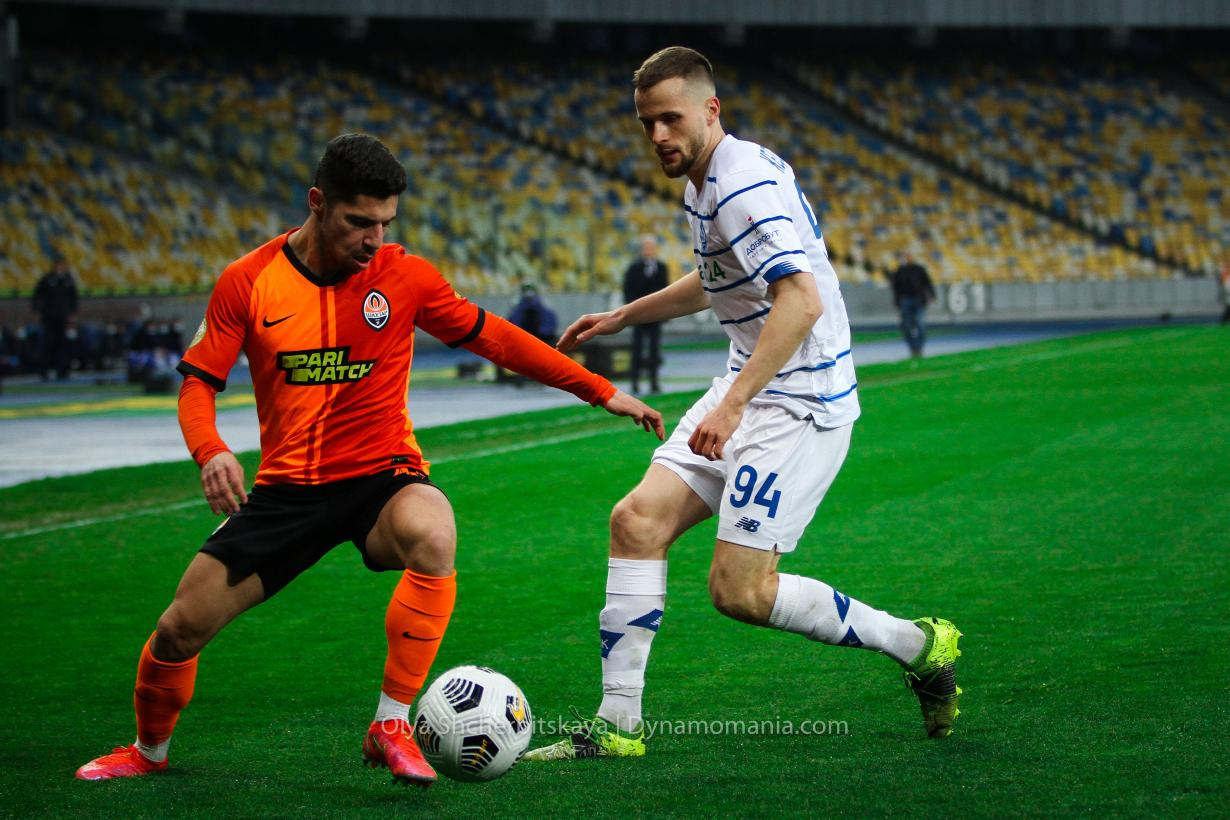
Solomon (left) and Tomasz Kędziora of Dynamo Kyiv in April 2021

After moving to Shakhtar, Solomon scored his first UEFA Champions League goal on 1 October 2019, in the 95th minute of an away match against Italian side Atalanta that ended in a 2–1 victory. This made him the then youngest Israeli footballer ever to score in the Champions League, at the age of 20. On 26 November, he scored the equalising goal in a 1–1 Champions League draw away at Manchester City.

Solomon continued his good Champions League form in the following season, scoring Shakhtar's third goal on 21 October 2020 in a 3–2 away victory over Spanish side Real Madrid. On 1 December, he scored the second goal in the return fixture against Real Madrid, helping his team to a 2–0 home victory. He celebrated both his first and second braces in back-to-back Ukrainian Premier League matches, the first on 14 March 2021 in a 4–0 home victory over Desna Chernihiv⁣ and the second on 21 March in a 3–2 defeat away to Lviv.

==== Loan to Fulham ====
On 25 July 2022, English Premier League club Fulham announced the signing of Solomon on a one-year loan, following a FIFA ruling concerning the Russo-Ukrainian War which allows foreign players affected by the war to suspend their contracts with Ukrainian clubs until 30 June 2023. Solomon started training with Fulham on 10 July, and became a registered player for the club on 1 August. Upon his signing, he became the top-paid Israeli footballer, earning £1.7 million per season, with performance bonuses that can increase his salary to £2.5 million.

He made his debut on 6 August, coming on as a substitute in the second half of a 2–2 home draw against Liverpool. On 7 January 2023, having recovered from a knee injury, he made his FA Cup debut for the club during their third round 2–0 away victory over Hull City, coming on as a second-half substitute. On 11 February, Solomon scored his first goal for the club, coming on as a 72nd-minute substitute in their Premier League match against Nottingham Forest, securing his team a 2–0 home win. On 18 February, in the following league week, Solomon netted a late winning goal in Fulham's 1–0 away victory over Brighton & Hove Albion. On 24 February he scored his third consecutive goal after coming on as a substitute, notching the equaliser in a 1–1 draw at home against Wolverhampton Wanderers. He became the first Israeli to have scored in three consecutive Premier League matches since Ronny Rosenthal in 1992. On 28 February he scored his fourth consecutive goal in a 2–0 FA Cup victory over Leeds United. On 6 March 2023 he scored his fifth consecutive goal in a 3–2 away defeat to Brentford.

=== Tottenham Hotspur ===
On 11 July 2023, Solomon signed for English Premier League club Tottenham Hotspur, as a free agent (thanks to an extended compensation year by FIFA ruling in favour of ex-Ukrainian leagues' foreign players); with a five-year contract running until 30 June 2028. Solomon told The Athletic that he felt an immediate connection with Tottenham, especially after he had learnt about the London club's rich Jewish history.

He made his professional league debut for the club on 19 August, coming on as a late substitute for Dejan Kulusevski in a 2–0 home victory over Manchester United. On 2 September, Solomon assisted Son Heung-min twice in a 5–2 away win against newly promoted Burnley.

==== Loans to Leeds United, Villarreal, and Fiorentina ====
On 27 August 2024, Solomon signed for EFL Championship club Leeds United on a season-long loan. He made his debut four days later in a 2–0 home league victory over Hull City, and crossed the ball to the near post for Mateo Joseph's opening goal. He scored two goals against Swansea City on 24 November, and another on 21 December against Oxford United.

On 21 April 2025, Solomon recorded two assists in a 6–0 win over Stoke City. Leeds sealed promotion back to the Premier League for the first time in two years later that day following Burnley's 2–1 win over Sheffield United. On 3 May, he scored the winning goal of a 2–1 victory over Plymouth Argyle. The goal came in added time and ensured that Leeds would be crowned as champions of the Championship for the 2024–25 season. Solomon's 10 league goals and 12 assists during the 2024–25 season with Leeds were also a career-high.

On 1 September 2025, Solomon signed for Spanish La Liga club Villarreal on a season-long loan. On 20 September, Solomon has made his debut in a 2–1 home win against Osasuna. On 23 September, he netted a goal in a 2–1 away victory over Sevilla.

On 2 January 2026, Solomon was recalled by Tottenham Hotspur from his loan at Villarreal; and immediately loaned out to Italian Serie A side Fiorentina.

=== West Ham United ===
On 10 August 2026, Solomon signed for EFL Championship club West Ham United for an undisclosed fee on a three-year contract, with an optional extension of a year. The transfer fee was reportedly about £5m.

On 16 August 2026, Solomon scored on his debut for West Ham in an away league match against Burnley, on the opening league matchday that ended in a 2–2 draw.

On 11 September 2026, he was named Man of the Match, after recording an assist and a goal in a 6–0 home league victory over Wrexham.

== International career ==
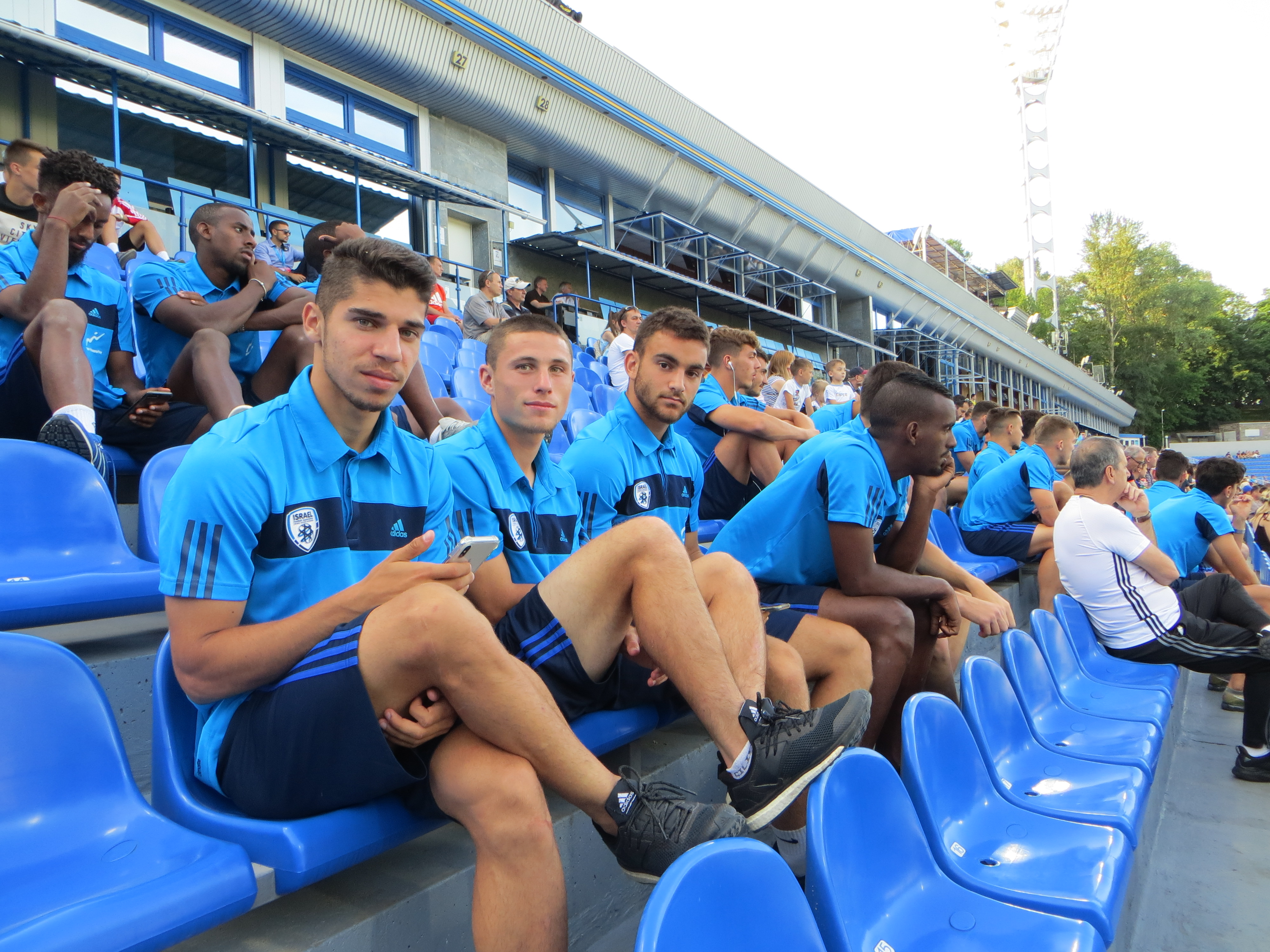
Solomon (front, furthest left) with Israel under-21 in 2018

At youth international level, Solomon has been capped 35 times and has scored seven goals for Israel.

On 21 May 2017, at 17 years of age, Solomon was called up to the Israeli senior side, although he did not appear for the team at the time. On 7 September 2018, Solomon made his senior debut for the Israeli squad at age 19, coming on as a 71st-minute substitute in a 2018–19 UEFA Nations League away match against Albania that ended in a 0–1 away loss.

On 18 November 2020, Solomon scored his first goal for Israel's seniors, in the 2020–21 UEFA Nations League 1–0 home victory over Scotland. The following 4 September, he scored again in a 5–2 home victory over Austria in 2022 World Cup qualifying.

On 10 June 2022, during a 2022–23 UEFA Nations League away match against Albania, Solomon scored a brace, bringing Israel back from a 0–1 deficit to a 2–1 win in just 16 minutes.

In September 2026, after a UEFA Nations League tie against the Republic of Ireland in Hungary in which he captained his nation to a 3–0 loss where the Irish team refused to shake hands with his team due to the ongoing Israel-Palestine conflict, Solomon lashed out at Ireland, saying that his country was "ten times better than theirs", and said "if I said what I really feel about Ireland, I would be suspended" and promised that Israel would play differently in their next tie in Serbia.

== Career statistics ==
=== Club ===
As of match played 4 November 2026

Appearances and goals by club, season and competition
Club	Season	League			National cup (Note: Includes Israel State Cup, Ukrainian Cup, FA Cup, Copa del Rey, Coppa Italia)		League cup (Note: Includes Israel Toto Cup, EFL Cup)		Continental		Other		Total	
Club	Season	Division	Apps	Goals	Apps	Goals	Apps	Goals	Apps	Goals	Apps	Goals	Apps	Goals
Maccabi Petah Tikva	2016–17	Israeli Premier League	23	2	4	0	0	0	–		–		27	2
Maccabi Petah Tikva	2017–18	Israeli Premier League	33	4	1	0	4	0	–		–		38	4
Maccabi Petah Tikva	2018–19	Israeli Premier League	12	2	1	0	5	2	–		–		18	4
Maccabi Petah Tikva	Total		68	8	6	0	9	2	–		–		83	10
Shakhtar Donetsk	2018–19	Ukrainian Premier League	11	0	3	1	–		2 (Note: Appearances in UEFA Europa League)	0	0	0	16	1
Shakhtar Donetsk	2019–20	Ukrainian Premier League	20	3	0	0	–		8 (Note: Five appearances and two goals in UEFA Champions League, three appearances and one goal in UEFA Europa League)	3	1 (Note: Appearance in Ukrainian Super Cup)	0	29	6
Shakhtar Donetsk	2020–21	Ukrainian Premier League	23	9	1	0	–		10 (Note: Six appearances and two goals in UEFA Champions League, four appearances in UEFA Europa League)	2	1	0	35	11
Shakhtar Donetsk	2021–22	Ukrainian Premier League	16	4	1	0	–		8 (Note: Appearances in UEFA Champions League)	0	1	0	26	4
Shakhtar Donetsk	Total		70	16	5	1	–		28	5	3	0	106	22
Fulham (loan)	2022–23	Premier League	19	4	5	1	0	0	–		–		24	5
Tottenham Hotspur	2023–24	Premier League	5	0	0	0	1	0	–		–		6	0
Leeds United (loan)	2024–25	Championship	39	10	2	0	–		–		–		41	10
Villarreal (loan)	2025–26	La Liga	6	1	3	0	–		2	0	–		11	1
Fiorentina (loan)	2025–26	Serie A	16	2	1	0	—		2 (Note: Appearances in UEFA Conference League)	0	—		19	2
West Ham United	2026–27	Championship	14	2	0	0	2	0	–		–		16	2
Career total			237	43	22	2	12	2	32	5	3	0	306	52

=== International ===
As of match played 17 November 2026

Appearances and goals by national team and year
National team	Year	Apps	Goals
Israel	2018	2	0
Israel	2019	5	0
Israel	2020	7	1
Israel	2021	12	3
Israel	2022	5	2
Israel	2023	6	1
Israel	2024	4	0
Israel	2025	7	1
Israel	2026	5	0
Total		53	8

Scores and results list Israel's goal tally first, score column indicates score after each Solomon goal.

List of international goals scored by Manor Solomon
No.	Date	Venue	Opponent	Score	Result	Competition
1	18 November 2020	Netanya Stadium, Netanya, Israel	Scotland	1–0	1–0	2020–21 UEFA Nations League B
2	31 March 2021	Zimbru Stadium, Chișinău, Moldova	Moldova	2–1	4–1	2022 FIFA World Cup qualification
3	5 June 2021	Podgorica City Stadium, Podgorica, Montenegro	Montenegro	2–0	3–1	Friendly
4	4 September 2021	Sammy Ofer Stadium, Haifa, Israel	Austria	1–0	5–2	2022 FIFA World Cup qualification
5	10 June 2022	Arena Kombëtare, Tirana, Albania	Albania	1–1	2–1	2022–23 UEFA Nations League B
6	10 June 2022	Arena Kombëtare, Tirana, Albania	Albania	2–1	2–1	2022–23 UEFA Nations League B
7	19 June 2023	Teddy Stadium, Jerusalem, Israel	Andorra	2–1	2–1	UEFA Euro 2024 qualification
8	8 September 2025	Zimbru Stadium, Chișinău, Moldova	Moldova	2–0	4–0	2026 FIFA World Cup qualification

== Honours ==
Shakhtar Donetsk

- Ukrainian Premier League: 2018–19, 2019–20, 2021–22
- Ukrainian Cup: 2018–19
- Ukrainian Super Cup: 2021

Leeds United

- EFL Championship: 2024–25

== See also ==
- List of Jewish footballers
- List of Jews in sports
- List of Israelis
- List of Israel international footballers
