= Rayan Oyebade =

Greek footballer (born 2007)

Personal information
- Full name: Rayan Dan Oyebade
- Date of birth: 30 April 2007 (age 19)
- Place of birth: Enfield, England
- Position: Defender

Team information
- Current team: Southend United (on loan from West Ham United)
- Number: 5

Youth career
- –2025: West Ham United

Senior career*
Years	Team	Apps	(Gls)
2025–	West Ham United	0	(0)
2026–	→ Southend United (loan)	7	(0)

International career^{‡}
2022	England U15	3	(0)
2025–	Greece U19	4	(0)
- * Club domestic league appearances and goals as of 24 September 2026 ‡ National team caps and goals as of 31 March 2026

Rayan Dan Oyebade (Greek: Ραγιάν Ογιεμπάντε; born 30 April 2007) is a professional footballer who plays as a defender for National League club Southend United, on loan from West Ham United. Born in England, he has represented England and Greece internationally at youth level.

== Early life ==
Oyebade was born on 30 April 2007. Born in England, he was born to a Nigerian father and a Greek mother.

== Club career ==
As a youth player, Oyebade joined the youth academy of English Premier League side West Ham United. In 2025, he was promoted to the club's under-21 team.

== International career ==
Oyebade is an England and Greece youth international. During the autumn of 2025 and the spring of 2026, he played for the Greece national under-19 football team for 2026 UEFA European Under-19 Championship qualification.

== Style of play ==
Oyebade plays as a defender. Nigerian newspaper The Nation wrote in 2025 that he is "a composed, left-footed centre-back... admired for his calmness in possession and sharp reading of the game".
