= Lewis Orford (footballer) =

English association football player (born 2006)

Personal information
- Full name: Lewis William Orford
- Date of birth: 18 February 2006 (age 20)
- Place of birth: Havering, England
- Height: 1.89 m (6 ft 2 in)
- Position: Midfielder

Team information
- Current team: West Ham United
- Number: 61

Youth career
- Upminster Park Rovers
- 2011–2023: West Ham United

Senior career*
Years	Team	Apps	(Gls)
2023–	West Ham United	11	(0)
2025	→ Stevenage (loan)	1	(0)

International career^{‡}
2022	England U16	2	(0)
2023–2024	England U18	8	(0)
2024–2025	England U19	7	(2)
2025–	England U20	3	(0)
- * Club domestic league appearances and goals as of 17:12, 7 November 2026 (UTC) ‡ National team caps and goals as of 15:27, 15 November 2025 (UTC)

Lewis William Orford (born 18 February 2006) is an English footballer who plays as a midfielder for West Ham United. He is an England youth international.

== Club career ==
Orford joined the academy system at West Ham United at five years old. During his early years at West Ham, Orford also played for Upminster Park Rovers, before formally registering for West Ham at the age of eight. He worked through the age groups and began playing for the under-18's under Kevin Keen during the 2021–22 season. He signed scholarship terms with West Ham in June 2022. Orford signed his first professional contract with West Ham shortly after his seventeenth birthday in February 2023.

He was included in a West Ham first team match day squad for the first time in November 2022, being an unused substitute as West Ham beat FCSB 3–0 in the UEFA Europa Conference League. That season he was part of the West Ham under-18 side that won the final of the FA Youth Cup defeating Arsenal 5–1 at the Emirates Stadium in April 2023.

He was promoted to the West Ham under-21 side for the 2023–24 season, despite still being only 17 years old. He scored two goals and was credited four assists from his first ten games in the Premier League 2 and EFL Trophy. He was called up to first-team training in November 2023. He subsequently travelled with the first-team squad for a UEFA Europa League fixture against Serbian side FK TSC on 30 November 2023.

On 18 January 2025, Orford made his senior debut for West Ham in a 2–0 loss against Crystal Palace in the Premier League.

=== Stevenage (loan) ===
On 1 September 2025, Orford joined League One club Stevenage on-loan for the 2025–26 season.

Orford scored on his debut for the club, on 21 October 2025, in a 5–2 win over Crystal Palace U21 in the group stages of the EFL Trophy. He scored the side's fifth and final goal in stoppage time and provided two assists earlier in the game both to Phoenix Patterson. On 26 November 2025, he returned to his parent club following the termination of his loan.

== International career ==
In May 2024, he was called-up to the England national under-18 football team. After winning the U18 Pinatar Super Cup in March 2024, Orford went on to captain the side to another trophy with a 2–1 win over Morocco to lift the U18 Tri-Nations Trophy.

On 5 September 2025, Orford made his U20 debut during a 2–1 defeat to Italy at the SMH Group Stadium.

== Style of play ==
Orford has been compared with former West Ham United captain Declan Rice. He was named by English newspaper The Guardian as one of the best first-year scholars in the Premier League in September 2022 with John Brewin drawing a comparison with Frank Lampard "in his ability to arrive late on the scene for scoring opportunities."

== Career statistics ==
As of match played 9 October 2026

Appearances and goals by club, season, and competition
Club	Season	League			FA Cup		EFL Cup		Europe		Other		Total	
Club	Season	Division	Apps	Goals	Apps	Goals	Apps	Goals	Apps	Goals	Apps	Goals	Apps	Goals
West Ham United U23	2022–23	—			—		—		—		1 (Note: Appearance(s) in EFL Trophy)	0	1	0
West Ham United U23	2023–24	—			—		—		—		5	1	5	1
West Ham United U23	2024–25	—			—		—		—		3	0	3	0
West Ham United U23	2025–26	—			—		—		—		1	1	1	1
West Ham United U23	Total		—		—		—		—		10	2	10	2
West Ham United	2024–25	Premier League	2	0	0	0	0	0	—		—		2	0
West Ham United	2025–26	Premier League	0	0	1	0	0	0	—		—		1	0
West Ham United	2026–27	Championship	8	0	0	0	3	0	—		—		11	0
West Ham United	Total		10	0	1	0	3	0	—		—		14	0
Stevenage (loan)	2025–26	League One	1	0	1	0	0	0	—		1	1	3	1
Career total			11	0	2	0	1	0	0	0	11	3	27	3

== Honours ==
West Ham United U18

- FA Youth Cup: 2022–23
- U18 Premier League South: 2023

England U18s

- 2024 U18 Pinatar Super Cup
- 2024 U18 Tri-Nations Trophy
