= 2000–01 Wimbledon F.C. season =

Wimbledon
2000–01 season
- Chairman: Charles Koppel
- Manager: Terry Burton
- Stadium: Selhurst Park
- First Division: 8th
- FA Cup: Fifth round
- League Cup: Fourth round
- Top goalscorer: League: Jason Euell (19); All: Jason Euell (20)
- Average home league attendance: 7,901

During the 2000–01 English football season, Wimbledon F.C. competed in the Football League First Division, following relegation from the FA Premier League the previous season.

== Season summary ==
Following the departures of key frontmen John Hartson and Carl Cort, Wimbledon were unable to make an immediate return to the top flight and finished in 8th, five points short of the playoffs; were it not for their mediocre home form (with 11 draws and only 7 wins all season) they could have aimed for a playoff spot or even an attempt for automatic promotion. Despite this disappointing season, Wimbledon did enjoy some highlights, including a 5–0 win of London rivals Queens Park Rangers at home and a 5–0 win over Sheffield Wednesday at Hillsborough.

Wimbledon's struggle to return to the top flight was only made harder with the sale of the club's top scorer, Jason Euell, to South London rivals Charlton Athletic at the end of the season.

== Kit ==
German company Puma became Wimbledon's kit manufacturers. Tiny Computers remained the kit sponsor.

== Final league table ==
Pos	Team	Pld	W	D	L	GF	GA	GD	Pts	Qualification or relegation
1	Fulham (C, P)	46	30	11	5	90	32	+58	101	Promotion to the Premier League
2	Blackburn Rovers (P)	46	26	13	7	76	39	+37	91	Promotion to the Premier League
3	Bolton Wanderers (O, P)	46	24	15	7	76	45	+31	87	Qualification for the First Division play-offs
4	Preston North End	46	23	9	14	64	52	+12	78	Qualification for the First Division play-offs
5	Birmingham City	46	23	9	14	59	48	+11	78	Qualification for the First Division play-offs
6	West Bromwich Albion	46	21	11	14	60	52	+8	74	Qualification for the First Division play-offs
7	Burnley	46	21	9	16	50	54	−4	72	
8	Wimbledon	46	17	18	11	71	50	+21	69	
9	Watford	46	20	9	17	76	67	+9	69	
10	Sheffield United	46	19	11	16	52	49	+3	68	
11	Nottingham Forest	46	20	8	18	55	53	+2	68	
12	Wolverhampton Wanderers	46	14	13	19	45	48	−3	55	
13	Gillingham	46	13	16	17	61	66	−5	55	
14	Crewe Alexandra	46	15	10	21	47	62	−15	55	
15	Norwich City	46	14	12	20	46	58	−12	54	
16	Barnsley	46	15	9	22	49	62	−13	54	
17	Sheffield Wednesday	46	15	8	23	52	71	−19	53	
18	Grimsby Town	46	14	10	22	43	62	−19	52	
19	Stockport County	46	11	18	17	58	65	−7	51	
20	Portsmouth	46	10	19	17	47	59	−12	49	
21	Crystal Palace	46	12	13	21	57	70	−13	49	
22	Huddersfield Town (R)	46	11	15	20	48	57	−9	48	Relegation to the Second Division
23	Queens Park Rangers (R)	46	7	19	20	45	75	−30	40	Relegation to the Second Division
24	Tranmere Rovers (R)	46	9	11	26	46	77	−31	38	Relegation to the Second Division

Rules for classification: 1) Points; 2) Goal difference; 3) Goals scored
(C) Champions; (O) Play-off winners; (P) Promoted; (R) Relegated

== Results ==
Wimbledon's score comes first

=== Legend ===
Win	Draw	Loss

=== Football League First Division ===
Date	Opponent	Venue	Result	Attendance	Scorers
12 August 2000	Tranmere Rovers	H	0–0	8,266	
19 August 2000	Burnley	A	0–1	15,124	
26 August 2000	Watford	H	0–0	8,447	
28 August 2000	Preston North End	A	1–1	13,519	Williams
9 September 2000	Sheffield Wednesday	A	5–0	15,856	Francis, Hartson (2), Euell (2)
12 September 2000	Huddersfield Town	A	2–0	7,592	Hartson (2)
16 September 2000	Wolverhampton Wanderers	H	1–1	8,761	Hartson
23 September 2000	Queens Park Rangers	A	1–2	11,720	Euell
30 September 2000	Stockport County	H	2–0	6,087	Ardley (pen), Francis
14 October 2000	Gillingham	H	4–4	9,030	Francis, Hartson (2), Euell
18 October 2000	Blackburn Rovers	H	0–2	6,019	
21 October 2000	Crewe Alexandra	A	4–0	5,469	Harley (2), Gayle, Euell
24 October 2000	West Bromwich Albion	A	1–3	15,570	Euell (pen)
28 October 2000	Sheffield United	H	0–0	7,327	
5 November 2000	Barnsley	A	1–0	13,641	Francis
11 November 2000	Fulham	H	0–3	14,071	
18 November 2000	Nottingham Forest	A	2–1	18,159	Euell, Andersen
25 November 2000	Norwich City	A	2–1	14,059	Hartson, Francis
2 December 2000	West Bromwich Albion	H	0–1	8,608	
5 December 2000	Crystal Palace	A	1–3	16,699	Roberts
9 December 2000	Birmingham City	A	3–0	16,778	Francis (2), Euell
13 December 2000	Grimsby Town	H	2–2	4,489	Euell, Andersen
16 December 2000	Bolton Wanderers	H	0–1	6,076	
23 December 2000	Tranmere Rovers	A	4–0	8,058	Andersen, Williams, Euell (2)
26 December 2000	Portsmouth	H	1–1	9,245	Francis
2 January 2001	Watford	A	1–3	11,336	Gayle
13 January 2001	Preston North End	H	3–1	7,242	Euell (2), Williams
20 January 2001	Portsmouth	A	1–2	12,488	Euell
10 February 2001	Sheffield Wednesday	H	4–1	6,741	Andersen (2), Euell, Beresford (own goal)
24 February 2001	Queens Park Rangers	H	5–0	9,446	Williams (2), Gayle, Euell (2)
3 March 2001	Stockport County	A	2–2	5,519	Agyemang, Wiss (own goal)
6 March 2001	Gillingham	A	0–0	8,841	
10 March 2001	Crystal Palace	H	1–0	13,167	Agyemang
13 March 2001	Grimsby Town	A	1–1	4,276	Agyemang
17 March 2001	Blackburn Rovers	A	1–1	19,000	Euell
31 March 2001	Bolton Wanderers	A	2–2	14,562	Agyemang, Cooper
4 April 2001	Wolverhampton Wanderers	A	1–0	16,767	Ardley
7 April 2001	Birmingham City	H	3–1	6,619	Nielsen, Hughes, Williams
10 April 2001	Burnley	H	0–2	6,132	
14 April 2001	Barnsley	H	1–1	7,609	Ainsworth
17 April 2001	Sheffield United	A	1–0	14,527	Roberts
21 April 2001	Nottingham Forest	H	2–1	10,027	Nielsen, Cooper
24 April 2001	Crewe Alexandra	H	3–3	5,468	Willmott, Cooper, Ardley
28 April 2001	Fulham	A	1–1	18,576	Euell (pen)
1 May 2001	Huddersfield Town	H	1–1	4,956	Ainsworth
6 May 2001	Norwich City	H	0–0	7,888	

=== FA Cup ===
Round	Date	Opponent	Venue	Result	Attendance	Goalscorers
R3	6 January 2001	Notts County	H	2–2	4,391	Ardley, Karlsson
R3R	27 January 2001	Notts County	A	1–0	9,084	Andersen
R4	6 February 2001	Middlesbrough	A	0–0	20,625	
R4R	13 February 2001	Middlesbrough	H	3–1	5,991	Ardley (pen), Euell, Hunt
R5	17 February 2001	Wycombe Wanderers	A	2–2	9,650	Williams, Agyemang
R5R	20 February 2001	Wycombe Wanderers	H	2–2 (lost 7–8 on pens)	4,391	Ainsworth, Gray

=== League Cup ===
Round	Date	Opponent	Venue	Result	Attendance	Goalscorers
R2 1st Leg	19 September 2000	Wigan Athletic	H	0–0	1,941	
R2 2nd Leg	26 September 2000	Wigan Athletic	A	2–1	5,387	Hartson, Gayle
R3	31 October 2000	Middlesbrough	H	1–0	3,666	Hartson (pen)
R4	29 November 2000	Manchester City	A	1–2	19,513	Roberts

== Players ==
=== First-team squad ===
Squad at end of season

Note: Flags indicate national team as defined under FIFA eligibility rules; some limited exceptions apply. Players may hold more than one non-FIFA nationality.

No.	Pos.	Nation	Player
1	GK	(England) ENG	Kelvin Davis
2	DF	(Republic of Ireland) IRL	Kenny Cunningham
3	DF	(England) ENG	Alan Kimble
4	MF	(England) ENG	Andy Roberts
5	DF	(England) ENG	Dean Blackwell
6	DF	(England) ENG	Darren Holloway
7	DF	(England) ENG	Neal Ardley
10	FW	(England) ENG	Jason Euell (Note: Euell was born in Lambeth, England, and represented England at U-21 level, but also qualified to represent Jamaica internationally through his father and made his international debut for Jamaica in November 2004.)
11	MF	(England) ENG	Kevin Cooper
12	DF	(Norway) NOR	Trond Andersen
14	GK	(England) ENG	Paul Heald
15	FW	(England) ENG	Carl Leaburn
16	MF	(Northern Ireland) NIR	Michael Hughes
17	DF	(Northern Ireland) NIR	Mark Williams (Note: Williams was born in Stalybridge, England, but also qualified to represent Northern Ireland internationally and made his international debut for Northern Ireland in 1999.)
18	MF	(England) ENG	Gareth Ainsworth
19	FW	(England) ENG	Paul Robinson
20	GK	(United States) USA	Ian Feuer
21	DF	(Scotland) SCO	Duncan Jupp (Note: Jupp was born in Haslemere, England, but also qualified to represent Scotland internationally and represented Scotland at U-21 level.)

No.	Pos.	Nation	Player
22	MF	(England) ENG	Chris Willmott
23	FW	(England) ENG	Ian Selley
24	MF	(England) ENG	Damien Francis (Note: Francis was born in Wandsworth, England, but also qualified to represent Jamaica internationally and made his international debut for Jamaica in 2003.)
25	FW	(England) ENG	Wayne Gray
26	FW	(England) ENG	Patrick Agyemang (Note: Agyemang was born in Waltham Forest, England, but also qualified to represent Ghana internationally and made his international debut for Ghana in May 2003.)
27	DF	(Republic of Ireland) IRL	Des Byrne
28	DF	(England) ENG	Peter Hawkins
29	MF	(England) ENG	Michael Thomas
30	MF	(Sweden) SWE	Pär Karlsson
31	MF	(Norway) NOR	Kjetil Wæhler
32	MF	(England) ENG	Ansah Owusu
33	MF	(England) ENG	Rob Gier (Note: Gier was born in Ascot, England, but also qualified to represent the Philippines internationally through his mother and made his international debut for the Philippines in April 2009.)
34	MF	(England) ENG	Jonathan Hunt
35	FW	(England) ENG	Lionel Morgan
36	FW	(Denmark) DEN	David Nielsen
37	MF	(England) ENG	Alex Tapp
38	DF	(South Africa) RSA	Matthew Booth (on loan from Mamelodi Sundowns)
39	GK	(England) ENG	Shane Gore

=== Left club during season ===
Note: Flags indicate national team as defined under FIFA eligibility rules; some limited exceptions apply. Players may hold more than one non-FIFA nationality.

No.	Pos.	Nation	Player
6	DF	(Iceland) ISL	Hermann Hreiðarsson (to Ipswich Town)
8	MF	(Jamaica) JAM	Robbie Earle (Note: Earle was born in Newcastle-under-Lyme, England, and was called up for England without playing, but also qualified to represent Jamaica internationally and made his international debut for Jamaica in 1997.) (retired)
9	FW	(Wales) WAL	John Hartson (to Coventry City)

No.	Pos.	Nation	Player
11	FW	(Jamaica) JAM	Marcus Gayle (Note: Gayle was born in Hammersmith, London, and represented England at U-18 level, but also qualified to represent Jamaica internationally through his father and made his international debut for Jamaica in 1998.) (to Rangers)
36	DF	(England) ENG	Jon Harley (on loan from Chelsea)

=== Reserve squad ===
Note: Flags indicate national team as defined under FIFA eligibility rules; some limited exceptions apply. Players may hold more than one non-FIFA nationality.

No.	Pos.	Nation	Player
—	DF	(England) ENG	Samuel Okikiolu
—	DF	(Germany) GER	Simon Mensing

No.	Pos.	Nation	Player
—	DF	(Finland) FIN	Heikki Haara
—	FW	(Republic of Ireland) IRL	Stephen O'Flynn

== Appearances and goals ==
Numbers in parentheses denote appearances as substitute.
Players with names struck through and marked † left the club during the playing season.
Players with names in italics and marked * were on loan from another club for the whole of their season with Wimbledon.
Players listed with no appearances have been in the matchday squad but only as unused substitutes.
Key to positions: GK – Goalkeeper; DF – Defender; MF – Midfielder; FW – Forward

Players contracted for the 2000–01 season
No.	Pos.	Nat.	Name	League		FA Cup		League Cup		Total	
No.	Pos.	Nat.	Name	Apps	Goals	Apps	Goals	Apps	Goals	Apps	Goals
1	GK	ENG	Kelvin Davis	45	0	6	0	4	0	55	0
2	DF	IRL	Kenny Cunningham	15	0	4 (1)	0	0	0	19 (1)	0
3	DF	ENG	Alan Kimble	21 (4)	0	3	0	1	0	25 (4)	0
4	MF	ENG	Andy Roberts	25 (2)	2	0 (1)	0	3	1	28 (3)	1
5	DF	ENG	Dean Blackwell	5 (1)	0	1	0	1	0	7 (1)	0
6	DF	ISL	~~Hermann Hreiðarsson~~ †	1	0	0	0	0	0	1	0
6	DF	ENG	Darren Holloway	30 (1)	0	4	0	0	0	34 (1)	0
7	MF	ENG	Neal Ardley	36 (1)	3	4 (1)	2	2	0	42 (2)	5
8	MF	JAM	~~Robbie Earle~~ †	0	0	0	0	0	0	0	0
9	FW	WAL	~~John Hartson~~ †	19	8	0	0	4	2	23	10
10	FW	ENG	Jason Euell	33 (3)	19	6	1	1	0	40 (3)	20
11	FW	JAM	~~Marcus Gayle~~ †	24 (8)	3	0 (4)	0	3	1	27 (12)	4
11	MF	ENG	Kevin Cooper	11	3	0	0	0	0	11	3
12	DF	NOR	Trond Andersen	40 (2)	5	6	1	4	0	50 (2)	6
14	GK	ENG	Paul Heald	1 (2)	0	0	0	0	0	1 (2)	0
15	FW	ENG	Carl Leaburn	2 (1)	0	0	0	0	0	2 (1)	0
16	MF	NIR	Michael Hughes	5 (5)	1	0	0	0	0	5 (5)	1
17	DF	NIR	Mark Williams	42	6	6	1	4	0	52	7
18	MF	ENG	Gareth Ainsworth	8 (4)	2	5 (1)	1	0	0	13 (5)	3
19	FW	ENG	Paul Robinson	0 (3)	0	0	0	1 (1)	0	1 (4)	0
20	GK	USA	Ian Feuer	0	0	0	0	0	0	0	0
21	DF	SCO	Duncan Jupp	4	0	0	0	2	0	6	0
22	DF	ENG	Chris Willmott	13 (1)	1	1	0	2	0	16 (1)	1
23	MF	ENG	Ian Selley	1 (3)	0	0	0	0	0	1 (3)	0
24	MF	ENG	Damien Francis	29	8	4	0	3	0	36	8
25	FW	ENG	Wayne Gray	1 (10)	0	0 (3)	1	0	0	1 (13)	1
26	FW	ENG	Patrick Agyemang	16 (13)	4	6	1	1 (1)	0	23 (14)	5
27	DF	IRL	Des Byrne	0	0	0	0	0	0	0	0
28	DF	ENG	Peter Hawkins	29 (1)	0	5	0	3	0	37 (1)	0
29	MF	ENG	Michael Thomas	5 (3)	0	0	0	1	0	6 (3)	0
30	MF	SWE	Pär Karlsson	7 (9)	0	5	1	1	0	13 (9)	1
31	DF	NOR	Kjetil Wæhler	0	0	0	0	0	0	0	0
32	MF	ENG	Ansah Owusu	1 (3)	0	0	0	1	0	2 (3)	0
33	DF	ENG	Rob Gier	13 (1)	0	0	0	1 (1)	0	14 (2)	0
34	MF	ENG	Jonathan Hunt	8 (4)	0	0 (2)	1	1 (1)	0	9 (7)	1
35	FW	ENG	Lionel Morgan	1 (4)	0	0	0	0 (1)	0	1 (5)	0
36	DF	ENG	~~Jon Harley *~~ †	6	2	0	0	0	0	6	2
36	FW	DEN	David Nielsen	9 (2)	2	0	0	0	0	9 (2)	2
37	MF	ENG	Alex Tapp	0	0	0	0	0	0	0	0
38	DF	RSA	Matthew Booth *	0	0	0	0	0	0	0	0
39	GK	ENG	Shane Gore	0	0	0	0	0	0	0	0
