= 2001–02 Wimbledon F.C. season =

Wimbledon
2001–02 season
- Chairman: Charles Koppel
- Manager: Terry Burton
- Stadium: Selhurst Park
- First Division: 9th
- FA Cup: Third round
- League Cup: First round
- Top goalscorer: David Connolly (18)
- Average home league attendance: 6,958

During the 2001–02 English football season, Wimbledon F.C. competed in the Football League First Division. It was their second consecutive season at this level.

== Season summary ==
Wimbledon's form dipped slightly from the previous season and the Dons finished in 9th place, one place lower than the previous season. This was not considered good enough and led to the sacking of manager Terry Burton after two years. He was replaced by goalkeeping coach Stuart Murdoch.

Meanwhile, behind the scenes, Wimbledon, already one of the smallest clubs in the division financially in spite of having been a Premiership club for the previous fifteen seasons, had fallen on hard times. In August 2001 the club announced its intention to move to Milton Keynes; the move was approved by the FA in April. Many Wimbledon fans, disgusted by this decision, created their own football club in response, AFC Wimbledon.

== Final league table ==
Pos	Team	Pld	W	D	L	GF	GA	GD	Pts
7	Burnley	46	21	12	13	70	62	+8	75
8	Preston North End	46	20	12	14	71	59	+12	72
9	Wimbledon	46	18	13	15	63	57	+6	67
10	Crystal Palace	46	20	6	20	70	62	+8	66
11	Coventry City	46	20	6	20	59	53	+6	66

Rules for classification: 1) Points; 2) Goal difference; 3) Goals scored

== Results ==
Wimbledon's score comes first

=== Legend ===
Win	Draw	Loss

=== Nationwide League Division One ===
Date	Opponent	Venue	Result	Attendance	Scorers
11 August 2001	Birmingham City	H	3–1	9,142	Shipperley, Cooper, Purse (og)
18 August 2001	Burnley	A	2–3	14,473	Nielsen, Shipperley
25 August 2001	Norwich City	H	0–1	6,084	
27 August 2001	Preston North End	A	1–1	13,349	Shipperley
9 September 2001	Watford	A	0–3	15,466	
12 September 2001	Portsmouth	H	3–3	7,138	Cooper, Hughes, Connolly
15 September 2001	Sheffield Wednesday	H	1–1	6,590	Hughes
18 September 2001	Crewe Alexandra	A	4–0	5,563	Brown, Connolly, Cooper, Nielsen
22 September 2001	West Bromwich Albion	A	1–0	19,222	Shipperley
25 September 2001	Millwall	H	2–2	7,020	Connolly, Agyemang
29 September 2001	Manchester City	A	4–0	32,989	Connolly (2 1(pen)), Shipperley (2)
13 October 2001	Crystal Palace	A	0–4	20,009	
20 October 2001	Gillingham	H	3–1	8,042	Cooper (2), Hughes
24 October 2001	Coventry City	H	0–1	5,883	
27 October 2001	Rotherham United	A	2–3	5,586	Connolly, McAnuff
30 October 2001	Bradford City	A	3–3	18,255	Connolly (2), Cooper
3 November 2001	Grimsby Town	H	2–1	6,189	Roberts, McAnuff
9 November 2001	Sheffield United	H	1–1	4,937	Cooper
17 November 2001	Barnsley	A	1–1	11,088	Cooper
20 November 2001	Walsall	H	2–2	4,249	Connolly (2)
24 November 2001	Wolverhampton Wanderers	H	0–1	9,873	
1 December 2001	Coventry City	A	1–3	17,303	McAnuff
8 December 2001	Stockport County	A	2–1	4,673	Cooper, Connolly
16 December 2001	Nottingham Forest	H	1–0	5,920	Willmott
22 December 2001	Norwich City	A	1–2	17,286	Connolly (pen)
29 December 2001	Preston North End	H	2–0	6,051	Shipperley, Agyemang
12 January 2002	Burnley	H	0–0	7,675	
19 January 2002	Birmingham City	A	2–0	17,766	Hughes, Agyemang
29 January 2002	Walsall	A	1–2	5,388	Shipperley
3 February 2002	Manchester City	H	2–1	10,664	Shipperley (2)
9 February 2002	Gillingham	A	0–0	8,494	
16 February 2002	Crystal Palace	H	1–1	13,564	Francis
19 February 2002	Watford	H	0–0	5,551	
23 February 2002	Millwall	A	1–0	13,788	Cooper
2 March 2002	West Bromwich Albion	H	0–1	8,363	
6 March 2002	Sheffield Wednesday	A	2–1	18,930	Connolly, Ardley
9 March 2002	Nottingham Forest	A	0–0	24,292	
12 March 2002	Portsmouth	A	2–1	13,118	Cooper, Connolly
16 March 2002	Stockport County	H	3–1	5,224	Connolly (2), Ardley
23 March 2002	Grimsby Town	A	2–6	6,473	Shipperley, Agyemang
30 March 2002	Rotherham United	H	1–0	4,751	Morgan
1 April 2002	Sheffield United	A	1–0	19,712	Ardley
4 April 2002	Crewe Alexandra	H	2–0	5,007	Shipperley, McAnuff
6 April 2002	Bradford City	H	1–2	5,595	Connolly (pen)
14 April 2002	Wolverhampton Wanderers	A	0–1	26,920	
21 April 2002	Barnsley	H	0–1	5,379	

=== FA Cup ===
Round	Date	Opponent	Venue	Result	Attendance	Goalscorers
R3	8 January 2002	Middlesbrough	H	0–0	6,885	
R3R	15 January 2002	Middlesbrough	A	0–2	9,687	

=== League Cup ===
Round	Date	Opponent	Venue	Result	Attendance	Goalscorers
R1	21 August 2001	Brighton and Hove Albion	A	1–2	6,344	Williams

== Kit ==
German company Puma remained Wimbledon's kit manufacturers.

== Players ==
=== First-team squad ===
Note: Flags indicate national team as defined under FIFA eligibility rules; some limited exceptions apply. Players may hold more than one non-FIFA nationality.

No.	Pos.	Nation	Player
1	GK	ENG	Kelvin Davis
2	DF	IRL	Kenny Cunningham
3	DF	ENG	Alan Kimble
4	MF	ENG	Andy Roberts
5	DF	ENG	Dean Blackwell
6	DF	ENG	Darren Holloway
7	MF	ENG	Neal Ardley
8	MF	ENG	Damien Francis (Note: Francis was born in Wandsworth, England, but also qualified to represent Jamaica internationally and made his international debut for Jamaica in 2003.)
9	FW	ENG	Neil Shipperley
10	FW	IRL	David Connolly (Note: Connolly was born in Brent, England, but also qualified to represent the Republic of Ireland internationally and made his international debut for the Republic of Ireland in May 1996.)
12	DF	NOR	Trond Andersen
14	GK	ENG	Paul Heald
16	MF	NIR	Michael Hughes (on loan to Birmingham City)
17	DF	NIR	Mark Williams (Note: Williams was born in Stalybridge, England, but also qualified to represent Northern Ireland internationally and made his international debut for Northern Ireland in 1999.)
18	MF	ENG	Gareth Ainsworth
19	FW	ENG	Paul Robinson
20	FW	ENG	Patrick Agyemang (Note: Agyemang was born in Waltham Forest, England, but also qualified to represent Ghana internationally and made his international debut for Ghana in May 2003.)
21	DF	SCO	Duncan Jupp (Note: Jupp was born in Haslemere, England, but also qualified to represent Scotland internationally and represented Scotland at U-21 level.)

No.	Pos.	Nation	Player
22	MF	ENG	Chris Willmott
23	DF	ENG	Peter Hawkins
24	MF	ENG	Jermaine Darlington
26	GK	USA	Ian Feuer
27	DF	ENG	Wayne Gray
28	MF	SWE	Pär Karlsson
29	DF	IRL	Des Byrne
30	MF	ENG	Rob Gier (Note: Gier was born in Ascot, England, but also qualified to represent the Philippines internationally through his mother and made his international debut for the Philippines in April 2009.)
31	FW	ENG	Lionel Morgan
32	MF	ENG	Adam Nowland
33	MF	ENG	Alex Tapp
34	FW	ENG	Ian Selley
35	MF	JAM	Jobi McAnuff (Note: McAnuff was born in Enfield, England, but also qualified to represent Jamaica internationally through his father and made his international debut for Jamaica in May 2002.)
36	MF	SWE	Håkan Mild
37	MF	ENG	Mikele Leigertwood (Note: Leigertwood was born in Enfield, England, but also qualified to represent Antigua and Barbuda internationally and made his international debut for Antigua and Barbuda in November 2008.)
38	GK	ENG	Shane Gore
39	MF	ENG	Nigel Reo-Coker
—	MF	GER	Simon Mensing

=== Left club during season ===
Note: Flags indicate national team as defined under FIFA eligibility rules; some limited exceptions apply. Players may hold more than one non-FIFA nationality.

No.	Pos.	Nation	Player
11	MF	ENG	Kevin Cooper (to Wolverhampton Wanderers)
15	FW	DEN	David Nielsen (to Norwich City)

No.	Pos.	Nation	Player
25	DF	ENG	Wayne Brown (on loan from Ipswich Town)

== Appearances and goals ==
Numbers in parentheses denote appearances as substitute.
Players with names struck through and marked † left the club during the playing season.
Players with names in italics and marked * were on loan from another club for the whole of their season with Wimbledon.
Players listed with no appearances have been in the matchday squad but only as unused substitutes.
Key to positions: GK – Goalkeeper; DF – Defender; MF – Midfielder; FW – Forward

Players contracted for the 2001–02 season
No.	Pos.	Nat.	Name	League		FA Cup		League Cup		Total	
No.	Pos.	Nat.	Name	Apps	Goals	Apps	Goals	Apps	Goals	Apps	Goals
1	GK	ENG	Kelvin Davis	40	0	0	0	0	0	40	0
2	DF	IRL	Kenny Cunningham	34	0	2	0	0	0	36	0
3	DF	ENG	Alan Kimble	7 (2)	0	0	0	1	0	8 (2)	0
4	MF	ENG	Andy Roberts	18	1	0	0	1	0	19	1
5	DF	ENG	Dean Blackwell	0	0	0	0	0	0	0	0
6	DF	ENG	Darren Holloway	32	0	2	0	0	0	34	0
7	MF	ENG	Neal Ardley	27 (2)	3	2	0	1	0	30 (2)	3
8	MF	ENG	Damien Francis	21 (2)	1	2	0	0	0	23 (2)	1
9	FW	ENG	Neil Shipperley	36 (5)	12	2	0	1	0	39 (5)	12
10	FW	IRL	David Connolly	35	18	2	0	1	0	38	18
11	MF	ENG	~~Kevin Cooper~~ †	39 (1)	10	2	0	1	0	42 (1)	10
12	DF	NOR	Trond Andersen	27 (3)	0	2	0	0	0	29 (3)	0
14	GK	ENG	Paul Heald	4	0	0	0	0	0	4	0
15	FW	DEN	~~David Nielsen~~ †	6 (6)	2	0	0	1	0	7 (6)	2
16	MF	NIR	Michael Hughes	24 (2)	4	2	0	0	0	26 (2)	4
17	DF	NIR	Mark Williams	4 (1)	0	0	0	1	1	5 (1)	1
18	MF	ENG	Gareth Ainsworth	0 (2)	0	0	0	0	0	0 (2)	0
19	FW	ENG	Paul Robinson	0 (1)	0	0	0	0	0	0 (1)	0
20	FW	ENG	Patrick Agyemang	17 (16)	4	0 (2)	0	0 (1)	0	16 (19)	4
21	DF	SCO	Duncan Jupp	1 (1)	0	0	0	0 (1)	0	1 (2)	0
22	DF	ENG	Chris Willmott	25 (2)	1	0	0	1	0	26 (2)	1
23	DF	ENG	Peter Hawkins	25 (4)	0	2	0	0	0	27 (4)	0
24	DF	ENG	Jermaine Darlington	25 (4)	0	0	0	1	0	26 (4)	0
25	DF	ENG	~~Wayne Brown *~~ †	17	1	0	0	0	0	17	1
26	GK	USA	Ian Feuer	2 (2)	0	2	0	1	0	5 (2)	0
27	FW	ENG	Wayne Gray	0	0	0	0	0	0	0	0
28	MF	SWE	Pär Karlsson	1 (6)	0	0	0	0	0	1 (6)	0
29	DF	IRL	Des Byrne	0 (1)	0	0	0	0	0	0 (1)	0
30	DF	ENG	Rob Gier	3	0	0	0	0 (1)	0	3 (1)	0
31	FW	ENG	Lionel Morgan	4 (7)	1	0	0	0	0	4 (7)	1
32	MF	ENG	Adam Nowland	1 (6)	0	0	0	0	0	1 (6)	0
33	MF	ENG	Alex Tapp	0	0	0	0	0	0	0	0
34	MF	ENG	Ian Selley	0	0	0	0	0	0	0	0
35	MF	JAM	Jobi McAnuff	22 (16)	4	0 (2)	0	0	0	22 (18)	4
36	MF	SWE	Håkan Mild	8 (1)	0	0	0	0	0	8 (1)	0
37	DF	ENG	Mikele Leigertwood	1	0	0	0	0	0	1	0
38	GK	ENG	Shane Gore	0 (1)	0	0	0	0	0	0 (1)	0
39	MF	ENG	Nigel Reo-Coker	0 (1)	0	0	0	0	0	0 (1)	0
