= 2002–03 Wimbledon F.C. season =

Wimbledon
2002–03 season
- Manager: Stuart Murdoch
- Stadium: Selhurst Park
- First Division: 10th
- FA Cup: Fourth round
- League Cup: Third round
- Top goalscorer: League: David Connolly (24); All: David Connolly/Neil Shipperley (24)

During the 2002–03 English football season, Wimbledon competed in the Football League First Division. It was their third consecutive season at this level.

== Players ==
=== First-team squad ===
Note: Flags indicate national team as defined under FIFA eligibility rules; some limited exceptions apply. Players may hold more than one non-FIFA nationality.

No.	Pos.	Nation	Player
1	GK	(England) ENG	Kelvin Davis
3	DF	(England) ENG	Peter Hawkins
4	DF	(England) ENG	Chris Willmott
6	DF	(England) ENG	Darren Holloway
7	MF	(Jamaica) JAM	Jobi McAnuff (Note: McAnuff was born in Enfield, England, but also qualified to represent Jamaica internationally through his father and made his international debut for Jamaica in May 2002.)
9	FW	(England) ENG	Neil Shipperley
10	FW	(Republic of Ireland) IRL	David Connolly (Note: Connolly was born in Brent, England, but also qualified to represent the Republic of Ireland internationally and made his international debut for the Republic of Ireland in May 1996.)
11	FW	(Ghana) GHA	Patrick Agyemang (Note: Agyemang was born in Waltham Forest, England, but also qualified to represent Ghana internationally and made his international debut for Ghana in May 2003.)
12	DF	(Norway) NOR	Trond Andersen
13	GK	(England) ENG	Paul Heald
14	FW	(England) ENG	Lionel Morgan
15	DF	(Germany) GER	Moritz Volz (on loan from Arsenal)
17	MF	(England) ENG	Adam Nowland

No.	Pos.	Nation	Player
18	FW	(England) ENG	Wayne Gray
19	DF	(England) ENG	Ben Chorley
20	MF	(England) ENG	Mikele Leigertwood (Note: Leigertwood was born in Enfield, England, but also qualified to represent Antigua and Barbuda internationally and made his international debut for Antigua and Barbuda in November 2008.)
21	DF	(Germany) GER	Nico Herzig
22	MF	(England) ENG	Rob Gier (Note: Gier was born in Ascot, England, but also qualified to represent the Philippines internationally through his mother and made his international debut for the Philippines in April 2009.)
23	MF	(England) ENG	Alex Tapp
24	MF	(England) ENG	Jermaine Darlington
25	DF	(England) ENG	Dean Lewington
26	MF	(England) ENG	Nigel Reo-Coker
27	MF	(England) ENG	Michael Gordon
28	MF	(England) ENG	Malvin Kamara (Note: Kamara was born in Greenwich, England, but also qualified to represent Sierra Leone internationally and made his international debut for Sierra Leone in June 2007.)
29	GK	(Italy) ITA	Tommaso Berni
30	GK	(England) ENG	Shane Gore

=== Left club during season ===
Note: Flags indicate national team as defined under FIFA eligibility rules; some limited exceptions apply. Players may hold more than one non-FIFA nationality.

No.	Pos.	Nation	Player
2	MF	(England) ENG	Gareth Ainsworth (to Cardiff City)
5	DF	(Northern Ireland) NIR	Mark Williams (Note: Williams was born in Stalybridge, England, but also qualified to represent Northern Ireland internationally and made his international debut for Northern Ireland in 1999.) (to Stoke City)
15	MF	(Sweden) SWE	Håkan Mild (to Göteborg)
19	FW	(England) ENG	Paul Robinson (to Blackpool)

No.	Pos.	Nation	Player
21	DF	(Scotland) SCO	Duncan Jupp (Note: Jupp was born in Haslemere, England, but also qualified to represent Scotland internationally and represented Scotland at U-21 level.) (to Notts County)
25	DF	(Republic of Ireland) IRL	Des Byrne (to Carlisle United)
27	DF	(Finland) FIN	Heikki Haara (to Lahti)
28	MF	(Sweden) SWE	Pär Karlsson (to Elfsborg)

== Statistics ==
=== Appearances and goals ===
No.	Pos	Nat	Player	Total		First Division		FA Cup		League Cup	
No.	Pos	Nat	Player	Apps	Goals	Apps	Goals	Apps	Goals	Apps	Goals
Goalkeepers
1	GK	(England) ENG	Kelvin Davis	51	0	46	0	2	0	3	0
Defenders
3	DF	(England) ENG	Peter Hawkins	47	0	43	0	2	0	2	0
4	DF	(England) ENG	Chris Willmott	5	0	5	0	0	0	0	0
6	DF	(England) ENG	Darren Holloway	19	0	14+2	0	0	0	3	0
15	DF	(Germany) GER	Moritz Volz	10	1	10	1	0	0	0	0
19	DF	(England) ENG	Ben Chorley	10	0	8+2	0	0	0	0	0
22	DF	(Philippines) PHI	Rob Gier	33	0	27+2	0	1	0	3	0
25	DF	(England) ENG	Dean Lewington	1	0	0+1	0	0	0	0	0
Midfielders
7	MF	(Jamaica) JAM	Jobi McAnuff	34	6	29+2	4	1	1	2	1
12	MF	(Norway) NOR	Trond Andersen	43	2	34+4	1	2	0	3	1
17	MF	(England) ENG	Adam Nowland	26	2	10+14	2	0	0	1+1	0
20	MF	(Antigua and Barbuda) ATG	Mikele Leigertwood	33	1	27+1	0	2	0	3	1
23	MF	(England) ENG	Alex Tapp	27	3	23+1	2	1	0	2	1
24	MF	(England) ENG	Jermaine Darlington	38	2	32+3	2	1	0	1+1	0
26	MF	(England) ENG	Nigel Reo-Coker	36	2	32	2	1+1	0	1+1	0
27	MF	(England) ENG	Michael Gordon	1	0	0+1	0	0	0	0	0
28	MF	(Sierra Leone) SLE	Malvin Kamara	2	0	0+2	0	0	0	0	0
Forwards
9	FW	(England) ENG	Neil Shipperley	51	24	46	20	2	1	3	3
10	FW	(Republic of Ireland) IRL	David Connolly	30	24	28	24	2	0	0	0
11	FW	(Ghana) GHA	Patrick Agyemang	36	6	12+21	5	1+1	0	1	1
14	FW	(England) ENG	Lionel Morgan	13	2	6+5	1	0+1	1	1	0
18	FW	(England) ENG	Wayne Gray	33	2	12+18	2	0+1	0	1+1	0
Players left during the season
2	MF	(England) ENG	Gareth Ainsworth	15	2	8+4	2	0+1	0	1+1	0
5	DF	(Northern Ireland) NIR	Mark Williams	25	1	23	1	2	0	0	0
28	MF	(Sweden) SWE	Pär Karlsson	3	0	2+1	0	0	0	0	0
