= 1999–2000 Wimbledon F.C. season =

Wimbledon
1999–2000 season
- Chairman: Sam Hammam; Bjørn Rune Gjelsten
- Manager: Egil Olsen (until 1 May); Terry Burton (caretaker)
- Stadium: Selhurst Park
- Premier League: 18th (relegated)
- FA Cup: Fourth round
- League Cup: Quarter-finals
- Top goalscorer: League: Carl Cort and John Hartson (9); All: Carl Cort (15)
- Highest home attendance: 26,129 (vs. Manchester United, 26 February)
- Lowest home attendance: 2,772 (vs. Cardiff City, 21 September)
- Average home league attendance: 17,156

During the 1999–2000 English football season, Wimbledon competed in the Premier League (known as the FA Carling Premiership for sponsorship reasons).

The season began with a new manager, Norway's Egil Olsen, after the close season resignation of long-serving Joe Kinnear, but Olsen was ousted with two weeks of the season remaining and replaced by coach Terry Burton, who was unable to save Wimbledon from relegation after 14 successive seasons of top division football.

== Season summary ==
Wimbledon's new season began with a 3–2 win against newly promoted Watford at Vicarage Road; this would turn out to be the Dons' only ever away league win throughout the season. The close-season resignation of former Joe Kinnear because of health problems (he would suffer from them again as manager of Newcastle United) after seven years as manager led to the appointment of former Norwegian national coach Egil Olsen as Wimbledon's new manager, giving Dons fans hope of beating the drop once again.

The mid-season collapse of star striker John Hartson's move to Tottenham Hotspur was further good news to the cause, but a run of eight straight defeats during the final weeks of the season dragged Wimbledon into the depth of the relegation mire. Olsen was sacked after a 3–0 defeat away to Bradford City, to be replaced by former coach and assistant manager Terry Burton for the final two games of the season. A 2–2 draw at home to Aston Villa gave them hope going into their last game, away to Southampton. They were one place above the relegation zone on goal difference, but a 2–0 defeat at the Dell – combined with Bradford's 1–0 win over Liverpool – condemned Wimbledon to relegation and ended their 14-year stay in the top flight. The transition coincided with the end of one of the most remarkable rags-to-riches stories in football, which had started with Wimbledon's election to the Football League in 1977 and seen them reach the top flight nine years later, before peaking as 1988 FA Cup final winners, also finishing as high as sixth in the league in 1987 and 1994. Their relegation was confirmed 12 years to the day that Wimbledon achieved their famous victory over Liverpool at Wembley.

== Final league table ==
Pos	Team	Pld	W	D	L	GF	GA	GD	Pts	Qualification or relegation
16	Derby County	38	9	11	18	44	57	−13	38	
17	Bradford City	38	9	9	20	38	68	−30	36	Qualification for the Intertoto Cup second round
18	Wimbledon (R)	38	7	12	19	46	74	−28	33	Relegation to the Football League First Division
19	Sheffield Wednesday (R)	38	8	7	23	38	70	−32	31	Relegation to the Football League First Division
20	Watford (R)	38	6	6	26	35	77	−42	24	Relegation to the Football League First Division

Source: Premier League
Rules for classification: 1) points; 2) goal difference; 3) number of goals scored.
(R) Relegated

Results summary

Overall								Home						Away					
Pld	W	D	L	GF	GA	GD	Pts	W	D	L	GF	GA	GD	W	D	L	GF	GA	GD
38	7	12	19	46	74	−28	33	6	7	6	30	28	+2	1	5	13	16	46	−30

Source: 1999-2000 FA Premier League table

Results by round

Round	1	2	3	4	5	6	7	8	9	10	11	12	13	14	15	16	17	18	19	20	21	22	23	24	25	26	27	28	29	30	31	32	33	34	35	36	37	38
Ground	A	H	H	A	A	H	H	A	H	A	H	A	H	H	A	A	H	A	H	A	H	A	H	H	A	H	A	H	A	A	H	A	H	H	A	A	H	A
Result	W	L	D	D	L	L	D	D	D	L	W	D	D	W	L	D	W	D	D	L	W	L	W	L	L	D	L	W	L	L	L	L	L	L	L	L	D	L
Position	8	10	9	11	15	16	16	16	17	18	15	15	15	15	15	14	13	14	14	15	13	14	13	14	16	15	16	15	16	16	16	17	17	17	17	18	17	18

Source: Soccerbase: 1999-2000 Wimbledon results
A = Away; H = Home; W = Win; D = Draw; L = Loss

== Results ==
Wimbledon's score comes first

=== Legend ===
Win	Draw	Loss

=== FA Premier League ===
Date	Opponent	Venue	Result	Attendance	Scorers
7 August 1999	Watford	A	3–2	15,511	Cort, Gayle, Johnson (own goal)
10 August 1999	Middlesbrough	H	2–3	11,036	Cort, Hartson
14 August 1999	Coventry City	H	1–1	10,635	Cort
21 August 1999	Newcastle United	A	3–3	35,809	Hughes, Ainsworth (2)
25 August 1999	Everton	A	0–4	32,818	
28 August 1999	Chelsea	H	0–1	22,167	
11 September 1999	Derby County	H	2–2	12,282	Hartson, Euell
18 September 1999	Manchester United	A	1–1	55,189	Badir
26 September 1999	Tottenham Hotspur	H	1–1	17,368	Hartson
2 October 1999	Sheffield Wednesday	A	1–5	18,077	Hartson
16 October 1999	Bradford City	H	3–2	10,029	Hartson (2), Cort
23 October 1999	Aston Villa	A	1–1	27,160	Earle
30 October 1999	Southampton	H	1–1	15,754	Gayle
7 November 1999	Leeds United	H	2–0	18,747	Hartson, Gayle
20 November 1999	Leicester City	A	1–2	18,255	Gayle
27 November 1999	Middlesbrough	A	0–0	31,400	
4 December 1999	Watford	H	5–0	14,021	Cort, Earle, Hartson, Euell, Gayle
18 December 1999	Arsenal	A	1–1	38,052	Cort
26 December 1999	West Ham United	H	2–2	21,180	Hreidarsson, Ardley
28 December 1999	Liverpool	A	1–3	44,107	Gayle
3 January 2000	Sunderland	H	1–0	17,621	Cort
15 January 2000	Coventry City	A	0–2	19,012	
22 January 2000	Newcastle United	H	2–0	22,118	Earle, Gayle
6 February 2000	Everton	H	0–3	13,172	
12 February 2000	Chelsea	A	1–3	34,826	Lund
26 February 2000	Manchester United	H	2–2	26,129	Euell, Cort
4 March 2000	Derby County	A	0–4	28,384	
11 March 2000	Leicester City	H	2–1	14,319	Ardley (pen), Euell
19 March 2000	Leeds United	A	1–4	39,256	Euell
26 March 2000	West Ham United	A	1–2	22,438	Hughes
1 April 2000	Arsenal	H	1–3	25,858	Lund
8 April 2000	Sunderland	A	1–2	41,592	Roy (own goal)
12 April 2000	Sheffield Wednesday	H	0–2	8,248	
16 April 2000	Liverpool	H	1–2	26,102	Andresen
22 April 2000	Tottenham Hotspur	A	0–2	33,086	
30 April 2000	Bradford City	A	0–3	18,276	
6 May 2000	Aston Villa	H	2–2	19,188	Ehiogu (own goal), Hartson
14 May 2000	Southampton	A	0–2	15,249	

=== FA Cup ===
Round	Date	Opponent	Venue	Result	Attendance	Goalscorers
R3	11 December 1999	Barnsley	H	1–0	4,505	Cort
R4	8 January 2000	Fulham	A	0–3	16,877	

=== League Cup ===
Round	Date	Opponent	Venue	Result	Attendance	Goalscorers
R2 1st Leg	14 September 1999	Cardiff City	A	1–1	7,613	Hughes
R2 2nd Leg	21 September 1999	Cardiff City	H	3–1 (4–2 on agg)	2,772	Cort, Earle (2)
R3	12 October 1999	Sunderland	H	3–2	4,790	Cort (3)
R4	30 November 1999	Huddersfield Town	A	2–1	13,312	Kimble, Euell
QF	14 December 1999	Bolton Wanderers	A	1–2	9,463	Cort

== Players ==
=== First-team squad ===
Squad at end of season

Note: Flags indicate national team as defined under FIFA eligibility rules; some limited exceptions apply. Players may hold more than one non-FIFA nationality.

No.	Pos.	Nation	Player
1	GK	SCO	Neil Sullivan (Note: Sullivan was born in Sutton, England, but also qualified to represent Scotland internationally and made his international debut for Scotland in 1997.)
2	DF	IRL	Kenny Cunningham
3	DF	ENG	Alan Kimble
4	MF	ENG	Andy Roberts
5	DF	ENG	Dean Blackwell
6	DF	ENG	Ben Thatcher (Note: Thatcher was born in Swindon, England, and represented England at U-21 level, but also qualified to represent Wales internationally through his grandmother and made his international debut for Wales in March 2004.)
7	FW	ENG	Carl Cort (Note: Cort was born in Southwark, England, but also qualified to represent Guyana internationally and made his international debut for Guyana in 2011.)
8	MF	JAM	Robbie Earle (Note: Earle was born in Newcastle-under-Lyme, England, and was called up for England without playing, but also qualified to represent Jamaica internationally through his parents and made his international debut for Jamaica in 1997.)
9	FW	WAL	John Hartson
10	MF	ENG	Jason Euell (Note: Euell was born in Lambeth, England, and represented England at U-21 level, but also qualified to represent Jamaica internationally through his father and made his international debut for Jamaica in November 2004.)
11	FW	JAM	Marcus Gayle (Note: Gayle was born in Hammersmith, London, and represented England at U-18 level, but also qualified to represent Jamaica internationally through his father and made his international debut for Jamaica in 1998.)
12	MF	ENG	Neal Ardley
13	GK	ENG	Paul Heald

No.	Pos.	Nation	Player
14	DF	NOR	Tore Pedersen
15	FW	ENG	Carl Leaburn
16	MF	NIR	Michael Hughes
18	MF	ENG	Gareth Ainsworth
19	DF	ISR	Walid Badir
20	MF	NOR	Martin Andresen
21	DF	SCO	Duncan Jupp (Note: Jupp was born in Haslemere, England, but also qualified to represent Scotland internationally and represented Scotland at U-21 level.)
22	DF	ENG	Chris Willmott
24	MF	ENG	Damien Francis (Note: Francis was born in Wandsworth, England, but also qualified to represent Jamaica internationally and made his international debut for Jamaica in 2003.)
29	MF	NOR	Trond Andersen
30	DF	ISL	Hermann Hreiðarsson
32	FW	ENG	Wayne Gray
34	FW	NOR	Andreas Lund

=== Left club during season ===
Note: Flags indicate national team as defined under FIFA eligibility rules; some limited exceptions apply. Players may hold more than one non-FIFA nationality.

No.	Pos.	Nation	Player
20	FW	NGA	Efan Ekoku (Note: Ekoku was born in Cheetham, England, but also qualified to represent Nigeria internationally and made his international debut for Nigeria in 1994.) (to Grasshoppers)
25	FW	IRL	Jon Goodman (Note: Goodman was born in Waltham Forest, England, but also qualified to represent the Republic of Ireland internationally and made his debut for the Republic of Ireland in 1997.) (retired)
26	MF	WAL	Ceri Hughes (to Portsmouth)

No.	Pos.	Nation	Player
31	DF	ENG	Danny Hodges (released)
36	FW	ENG	Patrick Agyemang (Note: Agyemang was born in Waltham Forest, England, but also qualified to represent Ghana internationally and made his international debut for Ghana in May 2003.) (on loan to Brentford)
—	DF	ENG	Andy Pearce (to Aldershot Town)

=== Reserve squad ===
The following players did not make an appearance for the first team this season.

Note: Flags indicate national team as defined under FIFA eligibility rules; some limited exceptions apply. Players may hold more than one non-FIFA nationality.

No.	Pos.	Nation	Player
17	DF	SCO	Brian McAllister
23	GK	ENG	Kelvin Davis
27	MF	ENG	Stewart Castledine

No.	Pos.	Nation	Player
28	DF	ENG	Peter Hawkins
31	MF	NOR	Kjetil Wæhler
33	GK	IRL	Brendan Murphy

== Transfers ==
=== In ===
- (Norway) Tore Pedersen – (Germany) Eintracht Frankfurt, 6 July 1999, free
- (Israel) Walid Badir – (Israel) Hapoel Petah Tikva, 1 July 1999, £1,000,000
- (Norway) Martin Andresen – (Norway) Stabæk Fotball, 4 October 1999, £1,800,000
- (England) Chris Willmott – (England) Luton Town, 9 July 1999, £650,000
- (England) Kelvin Davis – (England) Luton Town, 12 July 1999, £650,000
- (Norway) Trond Andersen – (Norway) Molde, 10 August 1999, £2,500,000
- (Iceland) Hermann Hreiðarsson – (England) Brentford, 12 October 1999, £2,500,000
- (Norway) Kjetil Wæhler – (Norway) Lyn, 29 October 1999, free
- (Norway) Andreas Lund – (Norway) Molde, 11 February 2000, £2,800,000

=== Out ===
- (England) Andy Clarke – (England) Peterborough United, 1 June 1999, free
- (England) Chris Perry – (England) Tottenham Hotspur, 3 July 1999, £4,000,000
- (Republic of Ireland) Mark Kennedy – (England) Manchester City, 8 July 1999, £1,000,000
- (England) Andy Futcher - (England) Doncaster Rovers, 1 September 1999, free
- (England) Peter Fear – (England) Oxford United, 13 July 1999, free
- (England) Andy Pearce – (England) Aldershot Town, 22 October 1999, free
- (Nigeria) Efan Ekoku – (Switzerland) Grasshoppers, 26 August 1999, £500,000
- (Republic of Ireland) Jon Goodman – retired, 26 January 2000
- (Wales) Ceri Hughes – (England) Portsmouth, 21 January 2000, £150,000

=== Loaned out ===
- (England) Patrick Agyemang – (England) Brentford, 4 months

== Statistics ==
=== Starting 11 ===
Only considering Premiership starts
Considering a 4–3–3 formation

- GK: #1, (Scotland) Neil Sullivan, 37
- RB: #6, (England) Ben Thatcher, 19
- CB: #2, (Republic of Ireland) Kenny Cunningham, 37
- CB: #30, (Iceland) Hermann Hreiðarsson, 24
- LB: #3, (England) Alan Kimble, 24
- RCM: #8, (Jamaica) Robbie Earle, 23
- CM: #29, (Norway) Trond Andersen, 35
- LCM: #10, (England) Jason Euell, 32
- RW: #7, (England) Carl Cort, 32
- CF: #11, (Jamaica) Marcus Gayle, 35
- LW: #9, (Wales) John Hartson, 15 (#5, (England) Dean Blackwell, made 16 starts as a central defender)

== Appearances and goals ==
Numbers in parentheses denote appearances as substitute.
Players with names struck through and marked † left the club during the playing season.
Players with names in italics and marked * were on loan from another club for the whole of their season with Burnley.
Players listed with no appearances have been in the matchday squad but only as unused substitutes.
Key to positions: GK – Goalkeeper; DF – Defender; MF – Midfielder; FW – Forward

Players contracted for the 1999–2000 season
No.	Pos.	Nat.	Name	League		FA Cup		League Cup		Total	
No.	Pos.	Nat.	Name	Apps	Goals	Apps	Goals	Apps	Goals	Apps	Goals
1	GK	SCO	Neil Sullivan	37	0	2	0	5	0	44	0
2	DF	IRL	Kenny Cunningham	37	0	2	0	4	0	43	0
3	DF	ENG	Alan Kimble	24 (4)	0	1	0	5	1	30 (4)	1
4	MF	ENG	Andy Roberts	14 (2)	0	1	0	5	0	20 (2)	0
5	DF	ENG	Dean Blackwell	16 (1)	0	0	0	4	0	20 (1)	0
6	DF	ENG	Ben Thatcher	19 (1)	0	0	0	2	0	21 (1)	0
7	FW	ENG	Carl Cort	32 (2)	9	2	1	5	5	39 (2)	15
8	MF	JAM	Robbie Earle	23 (2)	3	1	0	3 (1)	2	27 (3)	5
9	FW	WAL	John Hartson	15 (1)	9	1	0	3	0	19 (1)	9
10	FW	ENG	Jason Euell	32 (5)	4	2	0	5	1	39 (5)	5
11	FW	JAM	Marcus Gayle	35 (1)	7	2	0	3	0	40 (1)	7
12	MF	ENG	Neal Ardley	10 (7)	2	0 (1)	0	1	0	11 (8)	2
13	GK	ENG	Paul Heald	1	0	0	0	0	0	1	0
14	DF	NOR	Tore Pedersen	6	0	0	0	0	0	6	0
15	FW	ENG	Carl Leaburn	5 (13)	0	1	0	2 (2)	0	8 (15)	0
16	MF	NIR	Michael Hughes	13 (7)	2	0 (1)	0	1 (1)	1	14 (9)	3
17	DF	SCO	Brian McAllister	0	0	0	0	0	0	0	0
18	MF	ENG	Gareth Ainsworth	0 (2)	2	0	0	0	0	0 (2)	2
19	MF	ISR	Walid Badir	12 (9)	1	0 (1)	0	3	0	15 (10)	1
20	FW	NGA	~~Efan Ekoku~~ †	0	0	0	0	0	0	0	0
20	MF	NOR	Martin Andresen	4 (10)	1	1	0	0 (1)	0	5 (11)	1
21	DF	SCO	Duncan Jupp	6 (3)	0	0	0	2 (1)	0	8 (4)	0
22	DF	ENG	Chris Willmott	7	0	1	0	0 (1)	0	8 (1)	0
23	GK	ENG	Kelvin Davis	0	0	0	0	0	0	0	0
24	MF	ENG	Damien Francis	1 (8)	0	1	0	0 (3)	0	2 (11)	0
25	FW	IRL	~~Jon Goodman~~ †	0	0	0	0	0 (1)	0	0 (1)	0
26	MF	WAL	~~Ceri Hughes~~ †	0	0	0	0	0	0	0	0
27	MF	ENG	Stewart Castledine	0	0	0	0	0	0	0	0
28	DF	ENG	Peter Hawkins	0	0	0	0	0	0	0	0
29	DF	NOR	Trond Andersen	35 (1)	0	2	0	2	0	39 (1)	0
30	DF	ISL	Hermann Hreiðarsson	24	1	2	0	0	0	26	1
31	DF	ENG	~~Danny Hodges~~ †	0	0	0	0	0	0	0	0
31	MF	NOR	Kjetil Wæhler	0	0	0	0	0	0	0	0
32	FW	ENG	Wayne Gray	0 (1)	0	0 (1)	0	0	0	0 (2)	0
33	GK	IRL	Brendan Murphy	0	0	0	0	0	0	0	0
34	FW	NOR	Andreas Lund	10 (2)	2	0	0	0	0	10 (2)	2
