= Patrick Agyemang =

Patrick Agyemang may refer to:

- Patrick Agyemang (footballer, born 1980), Ghanaian
- Patrick Agyemang (soccer, born 2000), American
