= Wayne Gray (footballer) =

English footballer

Personal information
- Full name: Wayne William Gray
- Date of birth: 7 November 1980 (age 46)
- Place of birth: Camberwell, London, England
- Height: 5 ft 10 in (1.78 m)
- Position: Forward

Youth career
- Wimbledon

Senior career*
Years	Team	Apps	(Gls)
1999–2004	Wimbledon	75	(6)
2000	→ Swindon Town (loan)	12	(2)
2000	→ Port Vale (loan)	3	(0)
2001–2002	→ Leyton Orient (loan)	15	(5)
2002	→ Brighton & Hove Albion (loan)	4	(1)
2004–2006	Southend United	83	(20)
2006–2007	Yeovil Town	46	(11)
2007–2009	Leyton Orient	54	(8)
2009–2010	AFC Hornchurch		
2010	Grays Athletic	8	(1)
2010–2011	Cambridge United	23	(7)
2011	Chelmsford City	23	(12)
2011–2012	Woking	30	(7)
2012	Carshalton Athletic	5	(0)
2012–201?	AFC Hornchurch	27	(6)
Total		428	(86)
- * Club domestic league appearances and goals

Wayne William Gray (born 7 November 1980) is an English professional football forward. He scored 101 goals in 464 league and cup appearances throughout a 14-year professional career.

He started his career with Wimbledon in 1999, leaving the club following its controversial move to Milton Keynes. He then had two years with Southend United, one year with Yeovil Town and spent 2007 to 2009 with Leyton Orient. He made almost 300 appearances in the English Football League. He then dropped into non-League football with AFC Hornchurch in 2009 before joining Grays Athletic in 2010. The following year, he moved on to Chelmsford City via Cambridge United. He signed for Woking in summer 2011 and stayed at the club for one season. Following a brief stint at Carshalton Athletic, he returned to AFC Hornchurch in September 2012.

== Career ==
=== Wimbledon ===
Gray began his career at Wimbledon in 1999, where he stayed for five years. He made his debut on 8 January 2000, at Craven Cottage, in the 3–0 defeat to Fulham in the FA Cup. He was a 66th minute substitute for Damien Francis. His league debut came seven days later, where he was a late replacement for Francis in the 2–0 defeat at Coventry City. In March of that year, he joined First Division Swindon Town on an end-of-season loan. His first goal came in the 4–1 defeat at Portsmouth on 25 March. In October 2000, Gray dropped down to the Second Division, joining Brian Horton's Port Vale on loan, playing three games in his spell. He managed to break into the first team with the "Dons" by the end of the season. In 2001–02, he went to Third Division Leyton Orient on a four-month loan, starting in December. He scored six goals in 17 appearances, in all competitions, before returning to Selhurst Park. A short spell at Brighton & Hove Albion followed in April, where he scored on his debut; the 4–1 win over Colchester United. A regular in the first XI in 2002–03, he played a total of 33 games, scoring goals past Wolverhampton Wanderers and Nottingham Forest. He took to the field 35 times in 2003–04 – Wimbledon's final season. He scored four goals in three consecutive games, putting two past Preston North End and one each past Sheffield United and Bradford City.

=== Southend United ===
In June 2004, he was transferred to Southend United. Gray made 56 appearances for Southend in 2004–05. He played in the play-off final victory over Lincoln City and Football League Trophy defeat to Wrexham. In 2005–06, his 42 appearances and nine goals helped his club to the League One title. In May 2006, he was wanted by Ronnie Moore of Oldham Athletic, but the next month he signed with Yeovil Town.

=== Yeovil Town to Leyton Orient ===
He finished as Yeovil's top scorer in the 2006–07 season, as they reached the League One play-off final. In the summer of 2007, he signed for Leyton Orient for an undisclosed five-figure fee. He played 43 games in 2007–08, scoring 10 goals. Three of these goals came against Bristol Rovers, one in each of their league and FA Cup clashes. He suffered an anterior cruciate ligament (ACL) injury early in the 2008–09 season. He returned to the first-team as a substitute during the home defeat to Peterborough United on 3 March 2009. After making a few appearances before the end of the season, he was released by Orient in May.

=== Later career ===
In the summer of 2009, he had a trial with Rotherham United and claimed a goal on his debut against York City in the 3–1 win in pre-season. He then went on trial with Exeter City. In September 2009, he returned to Port Vale, joining Micky Adams' side on trial. Despite scoring in a reserve team outing, Adams only took a few days to lose interest in the striker. He then went on to play for AFC Hornchurch of the Isthmian League. He got his first goal for the club in the 5–1 friendly win over Welling United.

Gray signed for Conference National club Grays Athletic in January 2010. Having been released by Grays at the end of the season, Gray signed for Cambridge United following a successful pre-season trial. The move reunited him with manager Martin Ling, who he previously played under at Leyton Orient. He scored his first goal for Cambridge three matches into his spell, in a 5–0 win over Gateshead. Due to the club's financial situation, Gray was released from Cambridge in January 2011. However, he signed for Conference South club Chelmsford City after just four days as a free agent. He went on to score twelve goals in 23 games for Chelmsford before the season's end.

He signed for Chelmsford's Conference South rivals Woking in July 2011. Garry Hill's "Cardinals" won promotion as champions in 2011–12, with Gray scoring seven goals in 30 league games. Gray joined Isthmian League side Carshalton Athletic at the start of the 2012–13 season and made three full starts and three appearances from the bench but failed to find the net before being released at the end of September. He re-signed for AFC Hornchurch of the Conference South but could not help them to avoid relegation at the end of the 2012–13 season.

== Career statistics ==
Appearances and goals by club, season and competition
Club	Season	League			FA Cup		League Cup		Other		Total	
Club	Season	Division	Apps	Goals	Apps	Goals	Apps	Goals	Apps	Goals	Apps	Goals
Wimbledon	1999–2000	Premier League	1	0	1	0	0	0	—		2	0
Wimbledon	2000–01	First Division	12	0	3	1	0	0	0	0	15	1
Wimbledon	2002–03	First Division	30	2	1	0	2	0	0	0	33	2
Wimbledon	2003–04	First Division	32	4	3	0	0	0	0	0	35	4
Wimbledon	Total		75	6	8	1	2	0	0	0	85	7
Swindon Town (loan)	1999–2000	First Division	12	2	—		—		—		12	2
Port Vale (loan)	2000–01	Second Division	3	0	0	0	—		0	0	3	0
Leyton Orient (loan)	2001–02	Third Division	15	5	2	1	0	0	0	0	17	6
Brighton & Hove Albion (loan)	2001–02	Second Division	4	1	—		—		—		4	1
Southend United	2004–05	League Two	44	11	1	0	1	0	10 (Note: 7 appearances and 2 goals in the Football League Trophy, 3 appearances in the play-offs.)	2	56	13
Southend United	2005–06	League One	39	9	1	0	1	0	1 (Note: Appearance(s) in the Football League Trophy)	0	42	9
Southend United	Total		83	20	2	0	2	0	11	2	98	22
Yeovil Town	2006–07	League One	46	11	1	0	1	1	4 (Note: 1 appearance in the Football League Trophy, 3 appearances in the play-offs.)	0	52	12
Leyton Orient	2007–08	League One	38	8	2	2	2	0	1	0	43	10
Leyton Orient	2008–09	League One	16	0	0	0	0	0	0	0	16	0
Leyton Orient	Total		54	8	2	2	2	0	1	0	59	10
Grays Athletic	2009–10	Conference National	8	1	—		—		0	0	8	1
Cambridge United	2010–11	Conference National	23	7	2	0	—		0	0	25	7
Chelmsford City	2010–11	Conference South	23	12	0	0	—		0	0	23	12
Woking	2011–12	Conference South	30	7	—		—		6	4	36	11
Carshalton Athletic	2012–13	Isthmian League	5	0	0	0	—		1	0	6	0
AFC Hornchurch	2012–13	Conference South	27	6	0	0	—		0	0	27	6
Career total			408	86	17	4	7	1	23	6	455	97

== Honours ==
Southend United

- Football League One: 2005–06
- Football League Two play-offs: 2005
- Football League Trophy runner-up: 2004–05

Woking

- Conference South: 2011–12
