= Damien Francis =

Jamaican footballer (born 1979)

Personal information
- Full name: Damien Jerome Francis
- Date of birth: 27 February 1979 (age 47)
- Place of birth: Wandsworth, England
- Height: 1.85 m (6 ft 1 in)
- Position: Midfielder

Youth career
- –1997: Wimbledon

Senior career*
Years	Team	Apps	(Gls)
1997–2003	Wimbledon	97	(15)
2003–2005	Norwich City	73	(14)
2005–2006	Wigan Athletic	20	(1)
2006–2008	Watford	47	(5)
Total		237	(35)

International career
2003	Jamaica	1	(0)
- * Club domestic league appearances and goals

Damien Jerome Francis (born 27 February 1979) is a retired Jamaican international footballer who played as a defensive midfielder.

== Club career ==
=== Early career ===
As a child, Francis followed Wimbledon, and was a ball boy at their ground. He started playing for the club aged nine, originally as a defender, before moving into midfield.

After several successful seasons with Wimbledon, Francis moved to Norwich City and made a good impression including helping them reach the Premiership by winning the Championship in season 2003-2004.

=== Wigan Athletic ===
After Norwich were relegated at the end of their first season in the Premiership following a disappointing campaign, Francis made the decision to end his two-year stay at Carrow Road but remained in the Premiership by securing a transfer to promoted Wigan Athletic.

Despite Wigan's success in finishing 10th in the Premiership and reaching the League Cup final, it was a disappointing spell professionally for Francis, who did not feature as much as he would have liked to. He signed for newly promoted Watford for a fee of £1.5 million at the start of the 2006-2007 season.

=== Watford ===
On his début against Everton, he claimed a goal, only for it to be ruled an own goal by Alan Stubbs by the Premier League's goals panel. Francis would go on to feature regularly for Watford that season, playing 39 times and scoring four goals. These included a goal in Watford's run to the FA Cup semi-finals, against Ipswich Town in the fifth round. On 21 April 2007, in a game against Manchester City Francis injured his cruciate knee ligaments, an injury that was expected to keep him out for around six months. As a consequence of the 1–1 draw in that game, Watford were relegated. Francis injury actually kept him out for 18 months. He failed to recover fully from the injury and was forced to retire from football on 3 October 2008.

== Career statistics ==
=== Club ===
Appearances and goals by club, season and competition
Club	Season	League			FA Cup		League Cup		Other		Total	
Club	Season	Division	Apps	Goals	Apps	Goals	Apps	Goals	Apps	Goals	Apps	Goals
Wimbledon	1997–98	Premier League	2	0	0	0	0	0	—		2	0
Wimbledon	1998–99	Premier League	0	0	0	0	2	0	—		2	0
Wimbledon	1999–2000	Premier League	9	0	1	0	3	0	—		13	0
Wimbledon	2000–01	First Division	29	8	4	0	3	0	—		36	8
Wimbledon	2001–02	First Division	23	1	2	0	0	0	—		25	1
Wimbledon	2002–03	First Division	34	6	2	0	3	0	—		39	6
Wimbledon	Total		97	15	9	0	11	0	—		117	15
Norwich City	2003–04	First Division	41	7	1	0	1	0	—		43	7
Norwich City	2004–05	Premier League	32	7	1	0	2	0	—		35	7
Norwich City	Total		73	14	2	0	3	0	—		78	14
Wigan Athletic	2005–06	Premier League	20	1	3	0	1	0	—		24	1
Watford	2006–07	Premier League	32	3	5	1	2	1	—		39	5
Watford	2007–08	Championship	11	2	1	0	0	0	0	0	12	2
Watford	2008–09	Championship	4	0	—		2	1	—		6	1
Watford	Total		47	5	6	1	4	2	0	0	57	8
Career total			237	35	20	1	19	2	0	0	276	38

== Honours ==
Norwich City

- Football League First Division: 2003–04
