= Trond Andersen =

Norwegian footballer (born 1975)

Personal information
- Full name: Trond Andersen
- Date of birth: 6 January 1975 (age 51)
- Place of birth: Kristiansund, Norway
- Height: 1.89 m (6 ft 2 1/2 in)
- Position: Defender

Team information
- Current team: Lyn (head coach)

Youth career
- Clausenengen

Senior career*
Years	Team	Apps	(Gls)
1995–1999	Molde	105	(4)
1999–2003	Wimbledon	146	(6)
2003–2005	AaB	65	(2)
2005–2008	Brøndby	18	(1)

International career
1992	Norway U17	8	(1)
1993–1994	Norway U18	6	(1)
1996–1998	Norway U21	30	(1)
2002	Norway B	1	(0)
1999–2005	Norway	38	(0)

Managerial career
- 2014: Lyn (junior team)
- 2015–: Lyn
- * Club domestic league appearances and goals

Trond Andersen (born 6 January 1975) is a former Norwegian footballer, who played as a central defender or holding midfielder. He played professionally for Molde, Wimbledon, AaB and Brøndby.

== Club career ==
Andersen was born in Kristiansund and played for Clausenengen before he joined Molde ahead of the 1995 season. He played for the Tippeligaen side until the summer of 1999, when he was sold to Wimbledon, right before Molde's Champions League matches against Mallorca. Molde's head coach Erik Brakstad stated in 2011 that if the club had not sold their best player (Andersen), Molde could have advanced from the group stage of 1999–2000 UEFA Champions League.

After playing for Wimbledon for four seasons, Andersen moved to Denmark to play for Aalborg in the Danish Superliga in 2003, before being bought by rivals Brøndby in September 2005. In April 2006, he suffered a knee injury. As he had not recovered by March 2007, Andersen considered retiring from the game.

== International career ==
Andersen played 38 matches for the Norway national football team. He was on the roster for Euro 2000. His last international match was an April 2005 friendly match against Estonia.

== Career statistics ==
Appearances and goals by club, season and competition
Club	Season	League			National Cup		League Cup		Other		Total	
Club	Season	Division	Apps	Goals	Apps	Goals	Apps	Goals	Apps	Goals	Apps	Goals
Wimbledon	1999–2000	Premier League	36	0	2	0	2	0	0	0	40	0
Wimbledon	2000–01	First Division	42	5	6	1	4	0	0	0	52	6
Wimbledon	2001–02	First Division	30	0	2	0	0	0	0	0	32	0
Wimbledon	2002–03	First Division	38	1	2	0	3	1	0	0	43	2
Career total			146	6	12	1	9	1	0	0	167	8

== Coaching ==
In 2015, he took over as head coach of Lyn Fotball, after one season as junior coach.

== Honours ==
Individual

- Verdens Gang Norwegian Premier League Player of the Year 1999
