= Jason Euell =

English footballer (born 1977)

- Euell in 2026

Personal information
- Full name: Jason Joseph Euell
- Date of birth: 6 February 1977 (age 49)
- Place of birth: Lambeth, England
- Height: 6 ft 0 in (1.83 m)
- Positions: Forward; midfielder

Team information
- Current team: Preston North End (caretaker manager)

Youth career
- 1989–1995: Wimbledon

Senior career*
Years	Team	Apps	(Gls)
1995–2001	Wimbledon	141	(41)
2001–2006	Charlton Athletic	139	(34)
2006–2007	Middlesbrough	17	(0)
2007–2009	Southampton	62	(5)
2009–2011	Blackpool	36	(4)
2011	→ Doncaster Rovers (loan)	12	(3)
2011–2012	Charlton Athletic	11	(0)
2012	→ AFC Wimbledon (loan)	9	(0)
Total		427	(87)

International career
1996–1998	England U21	4	(0)
2004–2006	Jamaica	3	(1)

Managerial career
- 2013–2015: Charlton Athletic U21
- 2016–2020: Charlton Athletic U21
- 2026: Preston North End (caretaker)
- * Club domestic league appearances and goals

Jason Joseph Euell (born 6 February 1977) is a former professional footballer who played as either a forward or a midfielder. He is currently a coach at Preston North End.

He spent much of his career playing in the Premier League, with all but one season between 1995 and 2007 in the top flight – firstly with Wimbledon, where he spent six years, including one season in the First Division, then Charlton Athletic for five years, before a season with Middlesbrough.

He then dropped to the second tier of football in England, initially with Southampton, where he spent two years, before a 2009 move to Blackpool, where he was part of the team which won promotion to the Premier League. In 2011, he rejoined Charlton Athletic – by now in League One – for a second spell and helped them win promotion to the Championship. Later that season he was loaned to AFC Wimbledon, the successor to his first club.

Born in England, he was capped three times by the Jamaica national team.

== Club career ==
=== Wimbledon ===
Born in Lambeth, London, Euell rose through the ranks at the Wimbledon youth academy. He made his senior debut in the 1995 UEFA Intertoto Cup, as a substitute for Grant Payne on matchday one, against Bursaspor. After scoring on his league debut in October 1995 against Southampton as an 18-year-old, he went on to make further a further eight Premier League appearances, and scored one more goal, in the 1995–96 season. The following season he made a total of eight appearances, scoring two goals. In 1997–98 he began playing more regularly, making a total of 23 appearances, scoring eight goals, including three goals in three FA Cup games.

He established himself as a regular first team player in the 1998–99 season, making a total of 43 appearances, including 33 in the league and scoring ten goals. During the 1998–99 season, he scored twice on two occasions against Sheffield Wednesday and Coventry City. The following season he made a total of 45 appearances, scoring five goals. However, the Dons finished in 18th place and so were relegated to the First Division.

After the club's relegation, Euell was linked with a £5 million move to Charlton Athletic but the bid was rejected by Wimbledon. Nevertheless, he spent the 2000–01 season with Wimbledon in the First Division and scored 19 goals in 36 league games, his highest season tally of goals. Along the way Euell scored twice on four occasions this season against Sheffield Wednesday, Tranmere Rovers, Preston North End and Queens Park Rangers.

Euell made a total of 181 appearances, scoring 47 goals in six years with the Dons.

=== Charlton Athletic ===
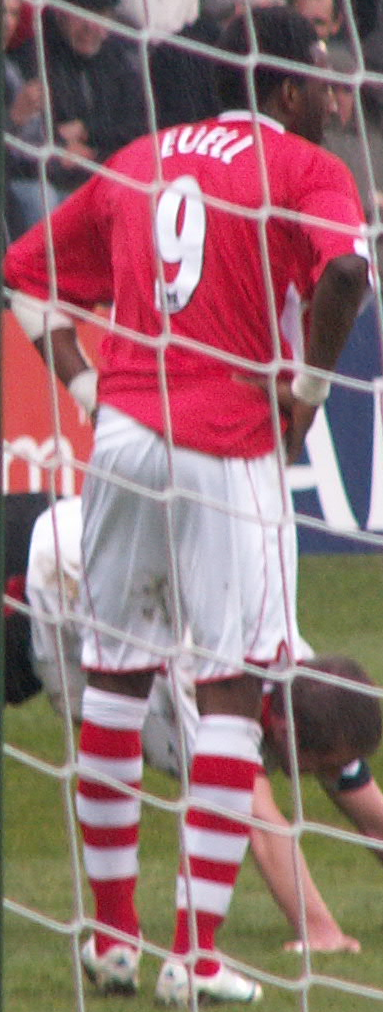
Euell playing for Charlton Athletic in 2006.

In July 2001, Charlton Athletic signed him for a club record fee of £4.75 million, bringing him back to the Premier League. He made his debut on 18 August in a 2–1 home defeat to Everton. His first goal for the Addicks came in the third round of the League Cup on 9 October in a 1–0 win over West Bromwich Albion at the Hawthorns. His first league goal came on 20 October in a 1–1 draw with Derby County at Pride Park.

On 19 November Euell scored a first half brace in a 4–4 home draw with West Ham United. He scored both goals in a 2–1 home win over Chelsea on 2 March 2002. In the 2001–02 season he made a total of 40 appearances, scoring 13 goals as the Addicks finished in 14th place in the Premier League. In his first three seasons with the Addicks Euell was top scorer.

In the 2002–03 season, Euell started the season well when he scored in a 2–1 win over Bolton Wanderers on 24 August 2002. Throughout December, he scored four goals against Liverpool, Manchester City and Tottenham Hotspur. Once again, he finished the season as a top scorer, scoring 11 goals in the total of 39 appearances.

In the 2003–04 season, Euell continued to be in goal-scoring form when he scored in a 4–0 win over Wolverhampton Wanderers, followed up by scoring in a 2–2 draw against Everton. However, he was sent–off for a second bookable offence in the 63rd minute when he made a "reckless tackle" on Gary Neville, in a 2–0 loss against Manchester United on 13 September 2003. After his sending off, Euell's action was criticised by Manager Alan Curbishley. This led to transfer speculation over Euell's future at Charlton, although this was denied by Curbishley. After serving a three match suspension, and despite being sidelined twice later in the season, he later scored twice against Wolverhampton Wanderers and Leeds United, a victory that ultimately saw them relegated. For the third time running, he finished the season as a top scorer, scoring 10 goals in total of 34 appearances.

In the 2004–05 season Euell went on to score twice against Portsmouth and Norwich City in the first half of the season. He struggled to replicate his form from his first three seasons due to injuries. He made seven starts in the season and spent much of his time on the substitute bench. During the season, Euell was the subject of transfer speculation after being linked with a move away from Charlton, although this was denied by Curbishley once again. He was previously targeted by a bid of £2.5 million from Crystal Palace, which was turned down during the transfer window. Nevertheless, he went on to make 31 appearances and scored twice.

In 2005–06 season, Euell missed much of the season with a shoulder injury, which he sustained in a friendly match against Dover Athletic. Following his return from injury in December, Euell failed to get back into the first team, scoring only once all season, although he turned down a transfer to Birmingham City in January 2006. In five years at the club Euell made a total of 155 appearances, scoring 37 goals.

=== Middlesbrough ===
Euell joined Middlesbrough on 31 August 2006 for £300,000. It came after Euell was not included under Manager Iain Dowie's plan at the start of the 2006–07 season and was placed on the transfer list.

His first game in a Boro shirt was a 1–1 draw with Arsenal on 9 September 2006 at the Emirates Stadium. Euell set up James Morrison to give Middlesbrough a 1–0 lead before Thierry Henry equalized. In a 0–0 draw against Liverpool on 18 November 2006, Euell was racially abused by Middlesbrough fan David Harton, leading him to be banned from attending football matches for three years. However, his stay at the Riverside Stadium lasted just one season, during which he made a total of 20 appearances, but failing to score. He started the 2007–08 season with Boro. However, after not figuring in manager Gareth Southgate's plans, his contract with the club was cancelled in late August 2007.

=== Southampton ===
On 31 August 2007, Euell moved to Championship club Southampton on a free transfer.

He made his Saints debut the following day as a 64th-minute substitute for Andrew Surman in a 3–0 win over Queens Park Rangers at Loftus Road. His first goal came in his eighth Saints appearance, when he scored the second goal in a 3–2 win over Burnley at Turf Moor on 27 October. Euell went on to score two more goals against Wolverhampton Wanderers and Bristol City. Despite being sidelined on two occasions, He made a total of 41 appearances in the 2007–08 season scoring three goals, as the club finished just two points above the relegation places in 20th on 54 points. During the season, he began playing in central defence following a defensive crisis.

In the 2008–09 season, Euell found his first team opportunities hard to come by under the management of Jan Poortvliet and appeared in the reserve side at the start of the season. As a result, Euell's future at the club was in doubt and considered leaving the club in the summer. After the summer transfer window closed, Manager Poortvliet was considering his choices to let Euell return to the first team. After dislocating his shoulder that kept him out for a month, Euell made his first appearance of the season, starting the whole game, in a 1–1 draw against Coventry City on 28 October 2008. However, in a 2–1 loss against Wolverhampton Wanderers on 15 November 2008, Euell received a straight red card after "he and Richard Stearman both dived in feet first for a loose ball but the Wolves man came off by far the worst." After serving a match ban, Euell returned to the starting eleven, where he set up a goal for Surman, in a 3–2 win over Burnley on 13 December 2008. Euell made 24 appearances, scoring two goals, both of which came in a 3–0 win over Ipswich Town at Portman Road on 3 March 2009. Southampton finished second bottom of the Championship in 23rd and were relegated to League One.

At the end of the 2008–09 season, Euell, along with Bradley Wright-Phillips, were told that they do have a future at the club but would be offered a new contract on a vastly reduced terms. Instead, Euell didn't respond to the contract offered at the club, making him a free agent and departed the club in favour of joining Blackpool. Prior to his release in May, local newspaper Daily Echo predicted that Euell were amongst the players to leave, due to his then being the highest earner at the club.

Euell made a total of 65 appearances in two seasons with the Saints, scoring five goals.

=== Blackpool ===
It was reported on 19 July 2009 that Euell was about to sign for Championship side Blackpool. Two days later he signed a one-year contract with an option for a further twelve months with the Seasiders. Of the move Euell said, "I had a meeting with Ian Holloway last week and it was a good, funny chat to discuss football as well as other things. It swayed for me to want to be here and be part of what Ian's trying to achieve in moving the club forward and I want to be part of that."

On 8 August 2009, he made his debut, and captained the team, as the Seasiders started the 2009–10 season with a 1–1 draw with Queens Park Rangers at Loftus Road. His first goal came in the Seasiders 2–1 win over Newcastle United at Bloomfield Road on 16 September. Two weeks later, on 16 September 2009, he scored his second goal of the season, in a 2–1 win over Peterborough United. Although his role was later reduced to the substitute bench and played in the reserve side later in the season, Euell went on to score 2 more goals, adding his tally to 4 in the total of 35 appearances. At the end of the 2009–10 season, Euell's contract at Blackpool was triggered for another year.

During a League Cup match between Blackpool and Stoke City at the Britannia Stadium on 22 September, Euell, who at the time was sat on the substitutes bench, was racially abused by a Stoke fan, who was ejected from the stadium and subsequently arrested by Staffordshire Police, before being released pending inquiries. Euell confronted the supporter that was taunting him. Blackpool manager Ian Holloway, who had to restrain Euell, was furious in his post-match interview, saying: "We are human beings and Jason is a footballer. The colour of his skin shouldn't matter. It was disgusting. The stewards believed what Jason said, got the bloke out and I hope he is banned for life. (He is) an absolute disgrace of a human being. I thought those days had gone. Jason was just sat in the dugout at the time. I saw his reaction and I had to calm him down. It's absolutely disgraceful." While Euell later said: "It did hurt. I felt I had to stand up for all colours and creeds and show that we won't accept it. I'm proud that I made a stand. It was a shock to hear what came out of the guy's mouth. Racism in football is not dead and buried but it's still a shock to hear that kind of thing in close proximity. There were people near the idiot who didn't agree with it, but there were others who turned a blind eye, which was disappointing." Euell received an official apology from Stoke City, who confirmed that they would "impose the toughest possible sanctions" on the supporter accused of racial abuse.

In the wake of the incident, Tottenham Hotspur manager Harry Redknapp called for fans who racially abuse players to be imprisoned, saying: "That is disgusting – there's no place for that in the game. Surely we can't have that sort of behaviour now? Anyone who does it should be put in prison – not banned from football. Stick them where they belong, in the nut-house. It's wrong." On 5 October, a 47-year-old man was charged with a racially aggravated public order offence and bailed to appear in court in Stoke-on-Trent on 13 October, when the case was adjourned until 10 November. On 25 November the fan, Robert Mason, said to suffer "from a schizo-affective disorder", admitted making a racist comment. He was given a three-year order banning him from all football grounds in the United Kingdom and fined £170.

Euell was a 76th-minute substitute in Blackpool's debut Premier League match, his first Premier League appearance since 2007, a 4–0 win over Wigan Athletic at the DW Stadium on 14 August 2010. Euell made two more Premier League appearances, against Aston Villa and Birmingham City, before falling down the pecking order.

He was released by Blackpool at end of the 2010–11 season.

==== Doncaster Rovers (loan) ====
After lack of first team appearance, He joined Doncaster Rovers on loan for a month from 18 February 2011, subject to clearance from the Premier League.

On 19 February 2011, Euell made his debut in a 3–0 loss against Swansea City. He scored his first goal for Doncaster against Watford, equalising in a 1–1 draw on 26 February 2011. His good performance at Doncaster Rovers led him to extend his loan spell until the end of the season. On 25 April 2011, Euell scored a brace in a 2–2 draw against Barnsley. At the end of the 2010–11 season, he went on to make 12 appearances and scoring 3 times for the side. Due to his good performance for Doncaster Rovers, Assistant manager Richard O'Kelly says the club keen to sign him permanently but however O'Kelly says it is 'too early' to discuss a permanent deal.

=== Charlton Athletic ===
After being released by Blackpool, Euell made a surprise addition to the Charlton squad for their friendly against Woking after handed a 20-minute run-out as a substitute which the result was 0–0. Then, Euell began training with former club Charlton Athletic with a view to a move back to The Valley, on 10 August 2011 he rejoined Charlton on a one-year deal having impressed while on trial. After joining, Euell told the club's official website: "It feels good to be back and I'm happy that Chris Powell and the club have allowed me to come back to train and get fit. It felt good to pull the Charlton shirt back on and to just play some football again." Euell also stated he has made him more determined to succeed the 2011–12 season since being a free agent.

On 13 August 2011, Euell re-made his debut for Charlton in a 2–1 win over Notts County. Ten days after making his debut, Euell scored his first goal for the club since 15 April 2006 in the League Cup First Round in a 2–1 win over Reading, which turns out to be the winning goal and send the club through to the next round. Although he began to play part-time for the side, Euell scored his second goal for the club since returning on 3 December in the FA Cup 2nd round against Carlisle. Charlton won the game 2–0 with Euell scoring in the 90th minute. At the end of the 2011–12 season, Euell was released from Charlton after being told his contract would not be renewed. By the time of his departure, he made 15 appearances and scored 2 times. Euell did take up a youth team coaching role at Charlton for the U16 side in July 2012.

==== AFC Wimbledon (loan) ====
On 10 January 2012, it was announced that Euell had signed a five-week loan for League Two club AFC Wimbledon, eleven years after he left the original, now defunct Wimbledon.

Euell made his debut for AFC Wimbledon, in a 2–1 win against Port Vale but suffered an ankle injury in the first half of his debut on 14 January 2012. After returning to training in early–February, Euell made his comeback from the problem against Northampton Town, with a 1–0 defeat on 14 February 2012. His good performance at Wimbledon led Euell has extended his loan spell at the club by another month. After making another handful of first team appearances for another month, he returned to his parent club in March 2012, having made 9 appearances.

== Coaching career ==
=== Charlton Athletic ===
In June 2011, Euell revealed that he's been working on his coaching badge. In the same year of October, Euell spoke out his opposition against a possible English application of the "Rooney Rule" to ensure that compulsory ethnic minority candidates are interviewed for managerial positions.

In September 2013, Euell took charge for the club's U21 squad for the first time. He was credited for promoting youngsters to the first team, such as, Joe Gomez, Ademola Lookman, Jordan Cousins and Joe Aribo.

In October 2015, Euell was appointed temporary as club's first-team coaching staff following the sacking of Guy Luzon. Following the return of Manager José Riga, Euell returned to take charge the club's U21 squad after failing to agree a deal to stay on as a first team coach in February 2016.

On 2 September 2019, Euell was named as a coach for the England U20s as part of The Football Association's 2019–20 Elite Coach Placement Programme.

On 1 April 2021, Euell was promoted to the role of first-team coach at Charlton Athletic.

On 21 October 2021, Euell was made caretaker assistant manager at Charlton Athletic working with caretaker manager Johnnie Jackson following the departure of Nigel Adkins.

On 23 June 2022, Charlton Athletic confirmed that Euell would leave his position as first-team coach at the club.

=== Bristol City ===
On 28 June 2022, Euell joined Bristol City as first team coach working alongside manager Nigel Pearson. He departed the club alongside Pearson in October 2023.

=== Cambridge United ===
On 7 July 2024, Euell joined League One side Cambridge United as assistant head coach.

=== Preston North End ===
Euell joined Preston North End of the Championship in England as a first team coach in June 2025. On 13 September, Euell was made caretaker manager, following the sacking of Paul Heckingbottom.

== International career ==
Euell was capped by the England under-20 team. He was in the squad for the 1997 FIFA World Youth Championship in Malaysia. After being an unused substitute for England's opening game in Group F, a 2–1 victory over Ivory Coast on 18 June, he made his debut two days later as a 64th minute replacement for Michael Owen in a 5–0 win over United Arab Emirates. On 26 June he was an 81st-minute substitute in England's 2–1 Round of 16 defeat to Argentina.

Euell qualified to play for Jamaica as his father was born there. And in July 2004, after attending a match between Jamaica and Haiti, Euell committed himself to play for the Jamaica national team, saying, "The last few weeks have really made me want to play for Jamaica. There is a World Cup to play for and it would just be amazing to be part of a tournament like that." It wasn't until October for Euell to finally be cleared to play for Jamaica after the original claim was turned down by the FIFA's players status committee. His debut came in the Reggae Boyz' final group game in their CONCACAF third stage qualification for the 2006 World Cup finals. Euell came on as a 71st-minute substitute in a 1–1 draw with the United States, a result which meant Jamaica were knocked out of the competition. On 1 June 2006 he scored in a 1–4 friendly defeat to Ghana at the Walkers Stadium, Leicester. That year he also played in a 0–6 friendly defeat to England.

He went on to make a total of three appearances for Jamaica, scoring one goal, from 2004 to 2006.

== Personal life ==
Euell is deaf in his right ear. Talking about this in 2006, he said, "It's never been an issue for me in terms of my football although, socially, it can occasionally have a bit of an impact. I think I tend to be a bit more aware of what's going on around me on the football pitch because I am deaf in one ear. Maybe that's led to some of my other senses becoming heightened a bit. It hasn't stopped me from doing anything at all on the football pitch. It didn't stop me developing as a youngster and I'm sure it won't stop me continuing to develop in the future."

Euell is also an ambassador for the National Deaf Awareness in Sport Alliance project. In September 2010, Euell became an ambassador for Kick It Out, saying: "If people can see that there are organisations out there, like Kick It Out, that can raise awareness of what needs to be done to stop racism up and down the country it will only help eradicate it from daily life. Football is a major sport in this country, so it's a good association to try and help but communities also play an important role." Euell is also an honorary patron of the Show Racism the Red Card organisation.

Euell is married to Andrea. In December 2001, Euell's baby daughter died and he missed two matches as a result.

== Career statistics ==
=== Club ===
Appearances and goals by club, season and competition
Club	Season	League			FA Cup		League Cup		Other		Total	
Club	Season	Division	Apps	Goals	Apps	Goals	Apps	Goals	Apps	Goals	Apps	Goals
Wimbledon	1995–96	Premier League	9	2	6	0	0	0	4 (Note: Appearances in the UEFA Intertoto Cup)	0	19	2
Wimbledon	1996–97	Premier League	7	2	0	0	1	0	–		8	2
Wimbledon	1997–98	Premier League	18	4	2	1	3	3	–		23	8
Wimbledon	1998–99	Premier League	33	10	3	0	7	0	–		43	10
Wimbledon	1999–2000	Premier League	38	4	2	0	5	1	–		45	5
Wimbledon	2000–01	First Division	36	19	6	1	1	0	–		43	20
Wimbledon	Total		141	41	19	2	17	4	4	0	181	47
Charlton Athletic	2001–02	Premier League	36	11	2	1	2	1	–		40	13
Charlton Athletic	2002–03	Premier League	36	10	2	1	1	0	–		39	11
Charlton Athletic	2003–04	Premier League	31	10	1	0	2	0	–		34	10
Charlton Athletic	2004–05	Premier League	26	2	3	0	2	0	–		31	2
Charlton Athletic	2005–06	Premier League	10	1	1	0	0	0	–		11	1
Charlton Athletic	Total		139	34	9	2	7	1	0	0	155	37
Middlesbrough	2006–07	Premier League	17	0	2	0	1	0	–		20	0
Southampton	2007–08	Championship	38	3	3	0	0	0	–		41	3
Southampton	2008–09	Championship	24	2	0	0	0	0	–		24	2
Southampton	Total		62	5	3	0	0	0	0	0	65	5
Blackpool	2009–10	Championship	33	4	1	0	1	0	0	0	35	4
Blackpool	2010–11	Premier League	3	0	1	0	0	0	–		4	0
Blackpool	Total		36	4	2	0	1	0	0	0	39	4
Doncaster Rovers (loan)	2010–11	Championship	12	3	–		–		–		12	3
Charlton Athletic	2011–12	League One	11	0	2	1	2	1	1 (Note: Appearances in the Football League Trophy)	0	16	2
AFC Wimbledon (loan)	2011–12	League Two	9	0	–		–		–		9	0
Career total			427	87	37	5	28	6	5	0	497	98

=== International ===
Scores and results list Jamaica's goal tally first, score column indicates score after each Euell goal.

List of international goals scored by Jason Euell
No.	Date	Venue	Opponent	Score	Result	Competition
1	1 June 2006	Walkers Stadium, Leicester, England	Ghana		1–4	Friendly

== Honours ==
Blackpool

- Football League Championship play-offs: 2010
