= Marcus Gayle =

Footballer (born 1970)

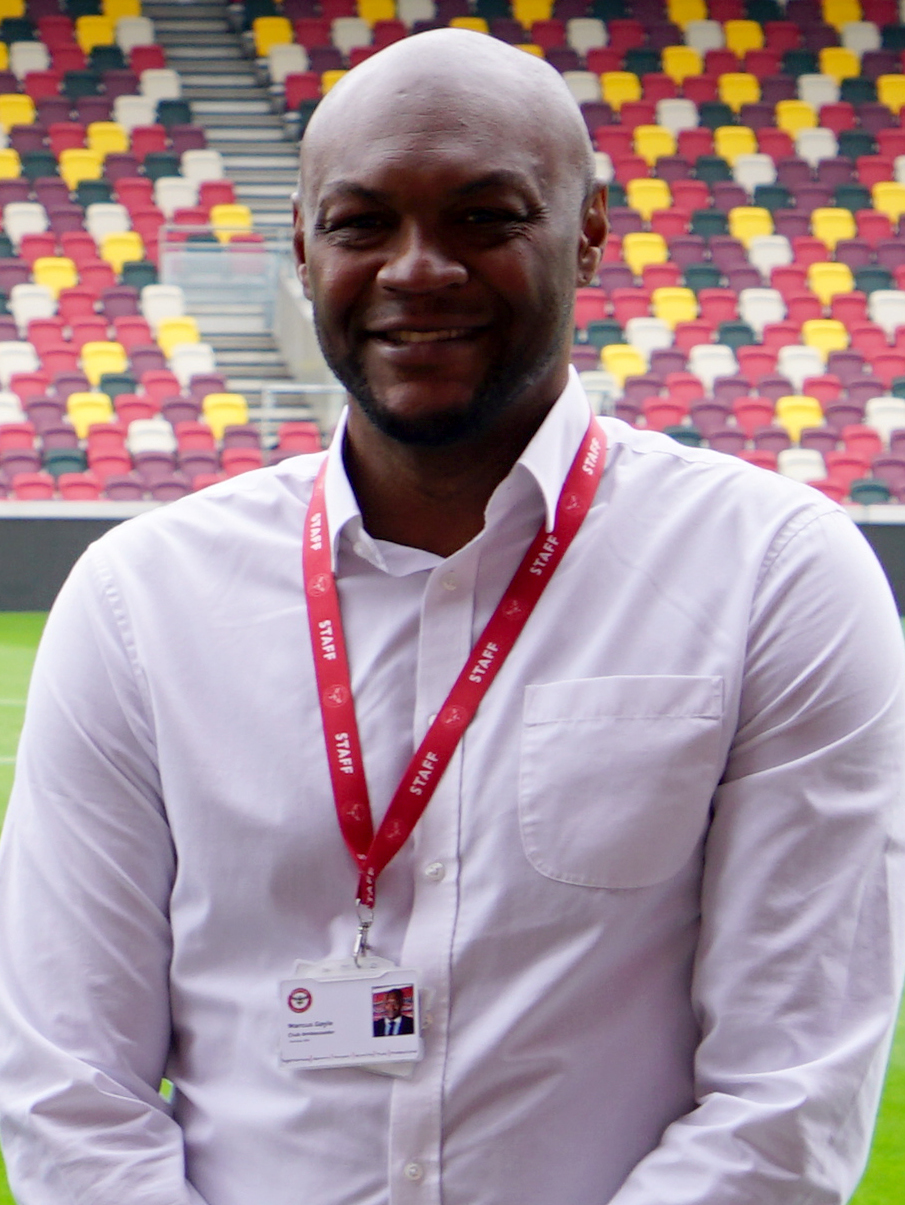
- Gayle in his Brentford ambassadorial role in 2021

Personal information
- Full name: Marcus Anthony Gayle
- Date of birth: 27 September 1970 (age 56)
- Place of birth: Hammersmith, England
- Height: 6 ft 1 in (1.85 m)
- Position: Striker

Team information
- Current team: Brentford (club ambassador)

Senior career*
Years	Team	Apps	(Gls)
1988–1994	Brentford	156	(22)
1990	→ KuPS (loan)	22	(9)
1994–2001	Wimbledon	236	(37)
2001	Rangers	4	(0)
2001–2005	Watford	102	(5)
2005–2006	Brentford	30	(2)
2006–2007	Aldershot Town	24	(7)
2007–2008	AFC Wimbledon	21	(2)
Total		595	(84)

International career
1988	England U18	1	(0)
1998–2000	Jamaica	18	(3)

Managerial career
- 2012–2014: Staines Town
- * Club domestic league appearances and goals

Marcus Anthony Gayle (born 27 September 1970) is a football coach and former professional player who serves as club ambassador at Brentford.

Gayle's primary position was as a striker but also played as a winger and central defender towards the end of his career. He notably played in the Premier League for Wimbledon and Watford, he also played in the Scottish Premiership for Rangers and in the Football League for Brentford and Aldershot Town before he finished his playing career with non-league side AFC Wimbledon. He is a member of the Brentford Hall of Fame and made 230 appearances in two spells with the club. Born in England, he won 14 caps for Jamaica and was a key player for his country at the 1998 World Cup tournament.

After retiring as a player, he became manager of the AFC Wimbledon reserve team for three years before taking charge of Staines Town in 2012.

== Club career ==
=== Brentford ===
Born Hammersmith, London, Gayle started his career at Brentford in 1988, scoring 27 goals in 194 appearances for the Bees. He was loaned to KuPS in 1990, before becoming a regular player in the Brentford side under new manager Phil Holder in 1990–91, when the Bees qualified for the playoffs but lost to eventual promotion winners Tranmere Rovers in the semi-finals. He played 33 games in the Third Division that season, scoring six goals. He was a key part in their Third Division title success for the 1991–92 season, scoring 6 goals in 38 games to give Brentford a place in the new First Division, as the old Second Division would be known from the start of the 1992–93 campaign due to the creation of the FA Premier League. The 1992–93 season looked as though it would be a successful one for the Bees, who entered the new year in 10th place and on the brink of the playoff zone, with all the talk at Griffin Park being about a second successive promotion and top division football for the first time since 1947. However, a collapse in the second half of the season saw the Bees relegated. Gayle initially remained loyal to the Bees, but on 24 March 1994 he linked up with his old Brentford striker partner Gary Blissett in a £250,000 move to Wimbledon, who were in the process of finishing a creditable sixth place in the Premier League. In May 2015, Gayle was inducted into the Brentford Hall of Fame.

=== Wimbledon ===
Gayle played an influential part during the nineties, He made his debut for Wimbledon two days after joining them as they beat Leeds United 1–0. He played in their final 10 games of the 1993–94, helping the Dons to 7 wins and 2 draws but did not score. He scored his first two goals in 1994–95, playing 25 games as the Dons finished ninth. He missed just four league games in the 1995–96 season, scoring five goals and helping Wimbledon finish 14th. In his best season for the Dons, 1996–97, he scored a total of thirteen goals, eight league goals as the Dons finished eighth in the Premier League and reached the semi-finals of both domestic cups. He also scored the winning goal for the Dons in a surprise FA Cup fourth round replay 1–0 win over Manchester United in February 1997.

1997–98 was less successful. The Dons began the season well and were in the top five for much of the first half of the season, but a dismal second half of the campaign saw them finish 15th. Gayle was a regular player once again, appearing 30 times in the league, but scored just twice. Gayle's form was good enough to make his debut for Jamaica in February vs Brazil in the gold cup and later featuring in the 1998 world cup in France that summer. He was their top scorer in 1998–99, scoring 10 league goals, but once again their good form tailed away to a late season slump and they finished 16th. He did manage seven goals in 1999–2000, but defeat to Southampton on the final day of the season and a surprise win for relegation rivals Bradford City over Liverpool meant that Wimbledon's 14-year stay in the top flight was over. In seven years with the Dons, Gayle played 285 games scoring 48 goals.

=== Rangers ===
Gayle initially stayed loyal to the Dons in spite of their relegation, playing 32 league games and scoring three times in the 2000–01 campaign before he finally departed on 9 March 2001 in a £1million move to Scottish Premier League giants Rangers. He made his debut against Dundee United, adding just another three more appearances, before moving back down south to join Gianluca Vialli's new look Watford side for £1million.

=== Watford ===
He started off brightly by scoring five goals in first 14 matches until a back injury hampered his season. He was as expected to leave, along with most of Vialli's other unsuccessful signings, in the summer of 2002. However, he re-emerged as a centre-back under new manager Ray Lewington and won the Player of the Season award that year. He also scored in the club's 2–1 defeat to Southampton in the FA Cup semi-finals and part of the group of players that deferred some of their wages to help the club out of their financial difficulties. Another good season followed in 2003–04 forging a good partnership alongside captain Neil cox, but injury plagued his 2004–05, and he left Watford two days after the sacking of Lewington in March 2005.

=== Return to Brentford ===
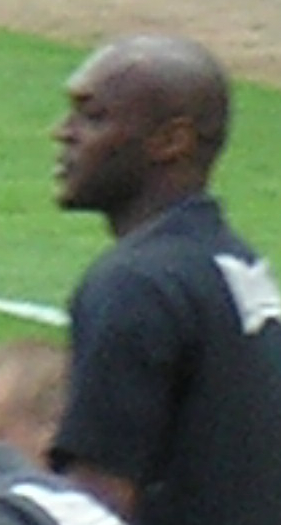
Gayle warming up for Brentford in 2006.

He re-joined Brentford, his first club and made 37 appearances for the Bees helping them to two consecutive play off semi finals, scoring twice. Gayle was released from his Brentford contract on 17 May 2006.

=== Aldershot Town ===
He signed for Aldershot Town on 2 July 2006. He scored the first hat-trick of his career for the Shots on 14 October 2006, coming on as a second-half substitute to score three times in just 9 mins 30 seconds against Kidderminster Harriers. In February 2007 Gayle damaged his ACL knee ligaments and cartilage, but still made the last few matches of the season he was released by Aldershot at the end of 2006–07 season scoring seven times in 27 appearances.

=== AFC Wimbledon ===
Gayle was signed for AFC Wimbledon in May 2007 by former Aldershot manager Terry Brown, making him only the second player to play competitively for both AFC Wimbledon and the old Wimbledon (the first being Jermaine Darlington) and, after scoring against Maidenhead United in the FA Trophy, becoming the first player to have scored for both incarnations of the South West London club and helping them to promotion to the conference south before retiring from playing that summer.

== International career ==
Gayle was born in England to a Jamaican father and Barbadian mother. He was capped by England at U18 level but later decided to switch allegiance and play for Jamaica who he was eligible to represent through his father. When a player at Wimbledon, Gayle signed a contract in June 1997 with a clause that restricted him to only represent England at international level. Horace Reid of the Jamaica Football Federation complained to FIFA about the restriction and the FIFA Player Status Committee refused to recognise the clause and allowed Gayle to change allegiance to Jamaica in January 1998.

Gayle was capped 14 times for Jamaica and played at the 1998 CONCACAF Gold Cup in United States and the 1998 FIFA World Cup in France, Jamaica's first ever World Cup finals. He played in the final group H match against Japan which Jamaica won by 2–1. Gayle was made captain the following year against Canada and held that honour for a year before retiring.

== Managerial career and backroom roles ==
=== AFC Wimbledon ===
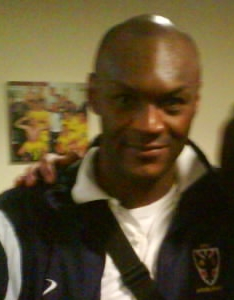
Gayle while with AFC Wimbledon in 2008.

He announced his retirement from competitive football after AFC Wimbledon sealed promotion to the Conference South following a 2–1 Isthmian League Premier play-off final victory over Staines Town. He is presently working towards his coaching badges and in September 2008 took the role of AFC Wimbledon reserve team manager. In his first year of taking over he guided his talented squad to two cup finals, winning the suburban league challenge cup and runners up in the suburban challenge shield in 2009. Runners up in the league came in 2010. In 2011, his reserves collected the league trophy for the very first time and also the champions cup, very unlucky not to pick up the treble after losing to South Park in the Suburban Premier Cup. Marcus is a member of the Wimbledon Old Players Association and has played for Wimbledon's Masters side and Old Players XI.

=== Staines Town ===
On 15 May 2012, it was announced that Marcus had been appointed as first team manager of Staines Town. In his first season as manager he guided his young team to safety in the Conference South Division whilst picking up the Middlesex Senior Cup, the 10th time Staines Town have won the competition. The second season brought an impressive 8th-place finish (Highest in club history) and reaching the 1st round proper of the FA Cup vs Brentford.

December 2014 Marcus was relieved of his duties due to a bad run of games.

== Personal life ==
In 2015 Marcus graduated from the EBM (Effective Board Member) course sponsored by the PFA and was later appointed a Board Member for Berkshire & Buckinghamshire FA. In January 2020, he was appointed club ambassador at Brentford.

Until 2010, Gayle owned a designer clothes shop in Fulham, London called 3 Tribes.

== Career statistics ==
=== Club ===
Appearances and goals by club, season and competition
Club	Season	League			National cup		League cup		Europe		Other		Total	
Club	Season	Division	Apps	Goals	Apps	Goals	Apps	Goals	Apps	Goals	Apps	Goals	Apps	Goals
Brentford	1988–89	Third Division	3	0	0	0	0	0	—		0	0	3	0
Brentford	1989–90	Third Division	9	0	0	0	0	0	—		0	0	9	0
Brentford	1990–91	Third Division	33	6	3	0	—		—		8 (Note: Six appearances and one goal in Football League Trophy, two appearances in Third Division play-offs)	1	44	7
Brentford	1991–92	Third Division	38	6	2	0	4	0	—		3 (Note: Appearances in Football League Trophy)	0	47	6
Brentford	1992–93	First Division	38	4	1	0	4	0	—		8 (Note: Appearances in Anglo-Italian Cup)	2	51	6
Brentford	1993–94	Second Division	35	6	2	2	1	0	—		2	0	40	8
Brentford	Total		156	22	8	2	9	0	—		21	3	194	27
KuPS (loan)	1990	Futisliiga	22	9	0	0	—		2 (Note: Appearances in Cup Winners' Cup)	1	—		24	10
Wimbledon	1993–94	Premier League	10	0	—		—		—		—		10	0
Wimbledon	1994–95	Premier League	23	2	0	0	2	0	—		—		25	2
Wimbledon	1995–96	Premier League	34	5	8	0	2	0	—		—		44	5
Wimbledon	1996–97	Premier League	36	8	6	2	2	1	—		—		44	11
Wimbledon	1997–98	Premier League	30	2	4	1	3	1	—		—		37	4
Wimbledon	1998–99	Premier League	35	10	1	0	4	1	—		—		40	11
Wimbledon	1999-00	Premier League	36	7	2	0	3	0	—		—		41	7
Wimbledon	2000–01	First Division	32	3	4	0	3	1	—		—		39	4
Wimbledon	Total		236	37	25	3	19	4	—		—		280	44
Rangers	2000–01	Scottish Premiership	4	0	0	0	—		—		—		4	0
Watford	2001–02	First Division	36	4	1	1	4	2	—		—		41	7
Watford	2002–03	First Division	31	0	5	1	0	0	—		—		36	1
Watford	2003–04	First Division	32	1	2	0	1	0	—		—		35	1
Watford	2004–05	Championship	3	0	0	0	0	0	—		—		3	0
Watford	Total		102	5	8	2	5	2	—		—		115	9
Brentford	2004–05	League One	6	0	—		—		—		2 (Note: Appearances in League One play-offs)	0	8	0
Brentford	2005–06	League One	24	2	2	0	1	0	—		1	0	28	2
Brentford	Total		30	2	2	0	1	0	—		3	0	36	2
Aldershot Town	2006–07	Conference Premier	24	7	3	0	—		—		0	0	27	7
AFC Wimbledon	2007–08	Isthmian League Premier Division	21	2	0	0	—		—		8 (Note: Three appearances and one goal in FA Trophy, two appearances in Isthmian League Premier Division play-offs, one appearance in Isthmian League Cup, one appearance in London Senior Cup, one appearance in Surrey Senior Cup)	1	29	3
Career total			595	84	46	7	34	6	2	1	32	4	709	102

=== International ===
Scores and results list Jamaica's goal tally first, score column indicates score after each Gayle goal.

List of international goals scored by Marcus Gayle
No.	Date	Venue	Opponent	Score	Result	Competition
1	9 February 1998	Los Angeles Memorial Coliseum, Los Angeles, United States	El Salvador	1–0	2–0	1998 CONCACAF Gold Cup
2	31 March 1999	Independence Park, Kingston, Jamaica	Paraguay	1–0	3–0	Friendly
3	27 May 1999	Råsunda Stadium, Stockholm, Sweden	Sweden	1–2	1–2	Friendly

== Honours ==
=== As a player ===
Brentford

- Football League Third Division: 1991–92

AFC Wimbledon

- Isthmian League Premier Division play-offs: 2008

=== As a manager ===
Staines Town

- Middlesex Senior Cup: 2012–13

=== As an individual ===
- Watford Player of the Season: 2002–03
- Brentford Hall of Fame
