= Michael Gordon (footballer) =

English footballer (born 1984)

Personal information
- Full name: Michael Alexander Gordon
- Date of birth: 10 November 1984 (age 41)
- Place of birth: Tooting, England
- Height: 5 ft 6 in (1.68 m)
- Position: Midfielder

Youth career
- 2001–2002: Arsenal

Senior career*
Years	Team	Apps	(Gls)
2002–2004	Wimbledon	19	(0)
2004	Swindon Town	0	(0)
2004–2005	Havant & Waterlooville	20	(0)
2005	Aldershot Town	1	(0)
2005	Crawley Town	0	(0)
2005–2006	Sutton United	16	(1)
2006–2007	AFC Wimbledon	0	(0)
2007	Harrow Borough		
2007	Hemel Hempstead Town		
2007–2009	Northwood	49	(5)
2009	Croydon Athletic		
2009	Merstham	16	(7)
2009–2010	Lincoln City	5	(0)
2011	Kingstonian		
2011–2012	Walton & Hersham		
2012	Chipstead		
2013	Walton & Hersham		
- * Club domestic league appearances and goals as of 22:40, 20 December 2013 (UTC)

Michael Alexander Gordon (born 10 November 1984) is an English footballer who most recently played for Walton & Hersham.

== Career ==
Gordon was born in Tooting.

Beginning as an apprentice at Arsenal, Gordon signed for Wimbledon in 2002 and made a total of 19 league appearances. Gordon also played league football with Swindon Town in 2004, but never made a league appearance. Gordon later played non-league football for a number of clubs including Havant & Waterlooville, Aldershot Town, Crawley Town, Sutton United, AFC Wimbledon, Harrow Borough, Hemel Hempstead Town and Northwood. Gordon later played non-league football with Croydon Athletic and Merstham, before signing for Lincoln City on 11 November 2009. He was released by Lincoln City in April 2010.

Further moves include Kingstonian in August 2011, Walton & Hersham in October 2011, Chipstead in October 2012, and Walton & Hersham again in January 2013.
