= Patrick Agyemang (footballer, born 1980) =

Ghanaian footballer (born 1980)

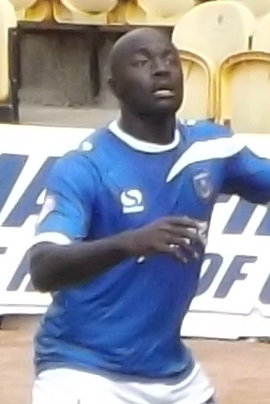
- Agyemang playing for Portsmouth in 2013

Personal information
- Full name: Patrick Agyemang
- Date of birth: 29 September 1980 (age 46)
- Place of birth: Walthamstow, England
- Height: 6 ft 1 in (1.85 m)
- Position: Forward

Youth career
- 1996–1998: Wimbledon

Senior career*
Years	Team	Apps	(Gls)
1998–2004	Wimbledon	120	(20)
1999–2000	→ Brentford (loan)	12	(0)
2004	Gillingham	33	(8)
2004–2008	Preston North End	122	(21)
2008–2012	Queens Park Rangers	75	(15)
2010	→ Bristol City (loan)	7	(0)
2011	→ Millwall (loan)	2	(0)
2012	→ Stevenage (loan)	13	(1)
2012–2013	Stevenage	14	(0)
2013	→ Portsmouth (loan)	15	(3)
2013–2015	Portsmouth	49	(4)
2014–2015	→ Dagenham & Redbridge (loan)	4	(0)
2017	Baffins Milton Rovers	0	(0)
2018	Cray Valley Paper Mills	1	(0)
Total		467	(72)

International career
2003–2006	Ghana	2	(1)
- * Club domestic league appearances and goals

Patrick Agyemang (born 29 September 1980) is a former professional footballer who played as a forward. Born in England, he represented the Ghana national team.

Agyemang began his career at Wimbledon, progressing through the youth system before making his senior debut on loan at Brentford in the 1999–2000 season. Returning to Wimbledon, he made 137 appearances and scored 22 goals, before leaving in January 2004 when the club's financial difficulties led to his transfer to First Division club Gillingham. Later that year, he signed for Preston North End for a fee of £350,000, where he remained for four seasons, scoring 21 goals in 135 matches. A transfer to Queens Park Rangers followed in January 2008, where he was part of the squad that achieved promotion to the Premier League in 2010–11, and he also spent loan periods at Bristol City and Millwall.

In January 2012, he joined Stevenage, initially on loan before making the move permanent, and subsequently signed for Portsmouth, where he played for two years and recorded eight goals in 69 appearances. He concluded his professional playing career in 2015 after a loan spell with Dagenham & Redbridge, later featuring briefly for non-League clubs Baffins Milton Rovers and Cray Valley Paper Mills. Internationally, Agyemang represented Ghana, earning two caps and scoring one goal for the national team.

== Club career ==
=== Wimbledon ===
Agyemang left school at the age of 16 and was offered academy scholarships by Wimbledon and Charlton Athletic. He opted to sign for Wimbledon as they had a reputation for giving their academy players first-team opportunities. Prior to making his Wimbledon first-team debut, Agyemang was loaned to Brentford on a three-month loan agreement during the 1999–2000 season. He made his Brentford debut in a 2–1 home defeat to Gillingham on 19 October 1999, coming on as a 56th-minute substitute in the match. Agyemang made 12 appearances for the club during the three-month spell, of which three were starting appearances. Whilst he did not score during his time at Brentford, Agyemang stated he gained a lot of confidence from his performances. He returned to Wimbledon in January 2000.

The 2000–01 season served as Agyemang's breakthrough season at Wimbledon; he played regularly during the season, and scored his first professional goal in a 2–2 away draw against Wycombe Wanderers on 17 February 2001. The goal served as the catalyst for a run of five goals in nine appearances. The following season, Agyemang scored four goals in 35 games as Wimbledon finished ninth in Division One. Agyemang scored six goals in 36 games during the 2002–03 season. Despite only playing in the first half of the 2003–04 season, he finished as Wimbledon's top goalscorer with seven goals in all competitions.

=== Gillingham ===
Due to Wimbledon's financial problems, Agyemang was sold to fellow Division One club Gillingham on 2 January 2004 for a fee of £150,000. Although reluctant to leave, he accepted the necessity of the transfer. Wimbledon manager Stuart Murdoch revealed that Agyemang was sometimes withheld from playing to avoid injury that could jeopardise the transfer, as the club relied on the funds from the sale.

Agyemang made his Gillingham debut in a 2–1 away defeat to Derby County on 17 January 2004, scoring his first goal two weeks later with the match-winner in a 1–0 victory over Bradford City at Priestfield. He added five more goals late in the 2003–04 season, including the first brace of his career against Walsall on 12 April 2004 and the winner against former club Wimbledon. After scoring twice in 14 appearances at the start of the 2004–05 season, Agyemang attracted transfer interest from Championship club Preston North End.

=== Preston North End ===
Preston agreed a transfer fee in the region of £350,000 with Gillingham for Agyemang on 14 November 2004, with the move completed on 16 November. He made his debut in a 1–0 away victory against Cardiff City on 19 November 2004, playing 73 minutes. Agyemang scored his first goal for Preston in the club's 3–0 home victory against Reading on 28 December 2004. He scored four times in 31 appearances during his first season, finishing the season playing a peripheral role behind forwards Richard Cresswell and David Nugent. This included three second-half substitute appearances in the Championship play-offs that season, where Preston lost 1–0 to West Ham in the final. Agyemang was a regular during the 2005–06 season, scoring six goals in 49 matches, including both play-off matches, which Preston lost 3–1 on aggregate to Leeds United. His six goals made him the club's second highest goalscorer for the season.

Agyemang scored an overhead kick in a 1–0 home victory against West Brom on 12 September 2006, described as "one of the best goals seen at Deepdale in the last couple of decades". He scored seven goals in 33 appearances that season, with Preston missing out on the play-offs by one point. During the 2007–08 season, Agyemang scored four goals in 22 appearances for Preston.

=== Queens Park Rangers ===
During the 2008 January transfer window, Agyemang was linked with transfers to Leicester City and Queens Park Rangers (QPR), with his Preston contract due to expire that summer. He signed for QPR on 3 January 2008 for a nominal fee, agreeing a four-and-a-half-year contract. Agyemang debuted for QPR two days later as a second-half substitute in a 1–0 FA Cup defeat away to Chelsea. He scored his first goal in the following match, a 2–1 away defeat to Sheffield United and subsequently scored a further seven goals in five league games. He finished the 2007–08 season with 18 appearances and nine goals for QPR. The 2008–09 season saw reduced playing time, with Agyemang making 12 starts and 23 appearances in total, scoring twice.

Agyemang subsequently signed for Championship club Bristol City on 25 January 2010, on a loan agreement until the end of the 2009–10 season. He made his first start a day later in a 6–0 home defeat to Cardiff City, making seven appearances during an injury-affected four months with the club. Returning to QPR for the 2010–11 season, he scored his first goal that season in a 2–2 draw away at Derby County, helping QPR maintain their unbeaten start with an injury-time equaliser. A stress fracture of his tibia sidelined him for most of the season. He made 19 league appearances, all as a substitute, as QPR won promotion to the Premier League.

Following the acquisitions of DJ Campbell and Jay Bothroyd ahead of QPR's return to the Premier League, Agyemang faced increased competition for forward positions. He started in the club's first away match of the season, a 1–0 win against Everton at Goodison Park on 20 August 2011, and played the full match in the following 2–0 defeat to Wigan Athletic on 27 August, which was his final appearance for QPR that season. Agyemang was made available for loan, joining Championship club Millwall on a 28-day loan agreement on 13 October 2011. He debuted two days later, playing the first 45 minutes in a 1–1 away draw against Middlesbrough on 15 October 2011 and made one further appearance before returning to QPR in November 2011. Agyemang was subsequently omitted from QPR's 25-man squad for the remainder of the season.

=== Stevenage ===
After four months without first-team football, Agyemang joined League One club Stevenage on loan until the end of the 2011–12 season on 8 March 2012. The move reunited Agyemang with manager Gary Smith, who had previously coached him at Wimbledon. He made his Stevenage debut two days after joining the club, playing the first 61 minutes in Stevenage's 2–2 home draw against Chesterfield. Agyemang scored his first goal for Stevenage in a 6–0 away victory against Yeovil Town on 14 April 2012. He made 15 appearances as Stevenage were defeated in the play-off semi-final to Sheffield United. Agyemang was released by QPR upon the expiry of his contract in June 2012.

Ahead of the 2012–13 season, Agyemang trained with Stevenage during pre-season and participated in the club's tour of Ireland. In August 2012, he had a one-week trial with Bidvest Wits of the Premier Soccer League in South Africa. No transfer materialised, and he signed for Stevenage on a free transfer on 31 August 2012.

=== Portsmouth ===
Having made 16 appearances for Stevenage without scoring, Agyemang joined League One club Portsmouth on a one-month loan on 8 February 2013. He debuted the following day in a 2–0 defeat to AFC Bournemouth and scored his first Portsmouth goal in his sixth appearance, on 2 March 2013, securing a 2–1 victory against Crewe Alexandra and providing an assist in the same match, ending Portsmouth's 23-game winless streak. His loan was extended for a further month on 8 March 2013. Despite Portsmouth's relegation to League Two, Agyemang's performances were cited as a factor in the team's late-season resurgence. He made 15 appearances during the loan and expressed a desire to join the club permanently.

Shortly after the 2012–13 season, Agyemang signed a two-year permanent contract with Portsmouth, officially joining the club on 1 July 2013. He played regularly during the 2013–14 season, scoring five times in 44 appearances as Portsmouth finished 13th in League Two. After the departure of manager Guy Whittingham, his playing time reduced, making 10 appearances during the first half of the following season. He joined fellow League Two club Dagenham & Redbridge on loan on 24 November 2014, making four appearances until the loan's conclusion on 3 January 2015. Agyemang left Portsmouth by mutual consent on 24 March 2015.

=== Later career ===
Without a club and training independently ahead of the 2015–16 season, Agyemang made the decision to retire from playing due to a knee injury, stating he could not maintain the physical demands required to play professional football. He briefly came out of retirement in November 2017, having not played competitive senior football since leaving Portsmouth two years earlier, to play for Baffins Milton Rovers of the Wessex League Premier Division. He made one appearance, in a 4–1 defeat to Horley Town in the FA Vase. Agyemang also made one appearance for Cray Valley Paper Mills of the Southern Counties East League, starting in a 5–3 away victory against Lordswood on 18 August 2018.

== International career ==
Born in England to Ghanaian parents, Agyemang was eligible to represent Ghana. Agyemang made his international debut for Ghana against Nigeria on 30 May 2003, in the 4-Nation LG Cup in Abuja, with Nigeria winning the match 3–1. He scored Ghana's only goal three minutes into his debut.

He was named in Ghana's 40-man preliminary squad for the 2006 Africa Cup of Nations, but did not make the final selection. In February 2006, Agyemang was called up to play for Ghana in the pre-2006 World Cup friendly against Mexico on 1 March 2006, played in the United States. He started the match, playing 74 minutes before being substituted for Alex Tachie-Mensah. Despite being considered an alternative attacking option due to his height and physical presence, Agyemang was not included in Ghana's final 23-man World Cup squad.

== Style of play ==
Agyemang was deployed as a forward throughout his career. Described as powerful and possessing "great pace", he often played on the shoulder of the last defender, confident that his pace would create goal-scoring opportunities. In the latter stages of his career, Agyemang felt he was wrongly labelled as a target man by managers, a role he felt did not suit his preference for playing with the ball at his feet and running the channels.

== Personal life ==
After retiring from professional football, Agyemang began working as a personal trainer.

== Career statistics ==
=== Club ===
Appearances and goals by club, season and competition
Club	Season	League			FA Cup		League Cup		Other		Total	
Club	Season	Division	Apps	Goals	Apps	Goals	Apps	Goals	Apps	Goals	Apps	Goals
Wimbledon	1998–99	Premier League	0	0	0	0	0	0	—		0	0
Wimbledon	1999–2000	Premier League	0	0	0	0	0	0	—		0	0
Wimbledon	2000–01	First Division	29	4	6	1	2	0	—		37	5
Wimbledon	2001–02	First Division	32	4	2	0	1	0	—		35	4
Wimbledon	2002–03	First Division	33	5	2	0	1	1	—		36	6
Wimbledon	2003–04	First Division	26	6	1	0	1	0	—		28	6
Wimbledon	Total		120	20	11	1	5	1	0	0	136	22
Brentford (loan)	1999–2000	Second Division	12	0	1	0	—		0	0	13	0
Gillingham	2003–04	First Division	20	6	—		—		—		20	6
Gillingham	2004–05	Championship	13	2	—		1	0	—		14	2
Gillingham	Total		33	8	0	0	1	0	0	0	34	8
Preston North End	2004–05	Championship	27	4	1	0	—		3 (Note: Appearances in 2005 Championship play-offs)	0	31	4
Preston North End	2005–06	Championship	42	6	4	0	1	0	2 (Note: Appearances in 2006 Championship play-offs)	0	49	6
Preston North End	2006–07	Championship	31	7	1	0	1	0	—		33	7
Preston North End	2007–08	Championship	22	4	—		0	0	—		22	4
Preston North End	Total		122	21	6	0	2	0	5	0	135	21
Queens Park Rangers	2007–08	Championship	17	8	1	0	—		—		18	8
Queens Park Rangers	2008–09	Championship	20	2	1	0	2	0	—		23	2
Queens Park Rangers	2009–10	Championship	17	3	2	0	2	0	—		21	3
Queens Park Rangers	2010–11	Championship	19	2	0	0	0	0	—		19	2
Queens Park Rangers	2011–12	Premier League	2	0	0	0	0	0	—		2	0
Queens Park Rangers	Total		75	15	4	0	4	0	0	0	83	15
Bristol City (loan)	2009–10	Championship	7	0	—		—		—		7	0
Millwall (loan)	2011–12	Championship	2	0	—		—		—		2	0
Stevenage (loan)	2011–12	League One	13	1	—		—		2 (Note: Appearances in 2012 League One play-offs)	0	15	1
Stevenage	2012–13	League One	14	0	1	0	—		1 (Note: Appearance in Football League Trophy)	0	16	0
Stevenage	Total		27	1	1	0	0	0	3	0	31	1
Portsmouth (loan)	2012–13	League One	15	3	—		—		—		15	3
Portsmouth	2013–14	League Two	41	4	1	0	1	0	1	1	44	5
Portsmouth	2014–15	League Two	8	0	1	0	0	0	1	0	10	0
Portsmouth	Total		64	7	2	0	1	0	2	1	69	8
Dagenham & Redbridge (loan)	2014–15	League Two	4	0	—		—		—		4	0
Baffins Milton Rovers	2017–18	WFL Premier Division	0	0	—		—		1 (Note: Appearance in FA Vase)	0	1	0
Cray Valley Paper Mills	2018–19	SCEL Premier Division	1	0	—		—		—		1	0
Career total			467	72	25	1	13	1	11	1	516	75

=== International ===
Appearances and goals by national team and year
National team	Season	Apps	Goals
Ghana	2003	1	1
Ghana	2006	1	0
Total		2	1

Ghana score listed first, score column indicates score after each Agyemang goal.

International goals by date, venue, opponent, score, result and competition
No.	Date	Venue	Opponent	Score	Result	Competition
1	30 May 2003	National Stadium, Abuja, Nigeria	Nigeria	1–0	1–3	Friendly

== Honours ==
Queens Park Rangers

- Football League Championship: 2010–11
