= Ian Selley =

English association football player

Personal information
- Full name: Ian Selley
- Date of birth: 14 June 1974 (age 52)
- Place of birth: Chertsey, Surrey, England
- Height: 5 ft 9 in (1.75 m)
- Position: Midfielder

Team information
- Current team: Leatherhead (manager)

Youth career
- 1990–1992: Arsenal

Senior career*
Years	Team	Apps	(Gls)
1992–1997	Arsenal	41	(0)
1996–1997	→ Southend United (loan)	4	(0)
1997–2000	Fulham	3	(0)
2000–2003	Wimbledon	4	(0)
2002	→ Southend United (loan)	14	(0)
2002	→ Southend United (loan)	11	(0)
2003–2007	Woking	97	(19)
2007	Lewes		
2007–2008	Grays Athletic	4	(0)
2008	Maidstone United		
2008–2009	Croydon Athletic		
2009–2010	Dorchester Town	15	(1)
2010–2011	Havant & Waterlooville	0	
2011–2012	Kingstonian	9	
2011–2012	→ Chertsey Town (loan)		
2012	→ Whyteleafe (loan)		
2021–2022	Dial Square	3	(2)
2023	Westfield	2	(0)

International career
1993	England U20	1	(0)
1994	England U21	3	(0)

Managerial career
- 2020–2021: Sandhurst Town
- 2021–2022: Chertsey Town
- 2022–2023: Hartley Wintney
- 2023–2024: Westfield
- 2024–: Leatherhead
- * Club domestic league appearances and goals

Ian Selley (born 14 June 1974) is an English football manager and former professional footballer who is the manager of Isthmian League Premier Division club Leatherhead.

He notably played in the Premier League for Arsenal, winning the 1994 UEFA Cup Winner's Cup with them, and in the Football League for Fulham, Wimbledon and Southend United. Beleaguered by a number of serious injuries which cut-short his professional aspirations, he thereafter forged a career in non-league football with clubs such as Woking, Lewes, Grays Athletic, Maidstone United, Croydon Athletic, Dorchester Town and Kingstonian.

During his time at Arsenal he made three appearances for the England Under-21 international team. He was a member of the last time Arsenal fielded an all English team in a Premier League game, in a 1–1 draw at home against Wimbledon on 19 April 1994.

== Playing career ==
=== Arsenal ===
Selley joined Arsenal in 1990 as a trainee and won a South East Counties League title medal and Floodlit Cup Winners medal in his first season. He made his first-team debut at the age of eighteen in a 1–0 defeat against Blackburn Rovers in September 1992. Selley played nine games for Arsenal in the 1992–93 season and fifteen games in the 1993–94 season. Injuries to several key players gave Selley his most famous appearance for the club, when he was the youngest player on the field in Arsenal's 1994 European Cup Winners' Cup Final victory over Parma. He had previously been an unused substitute in the 1993 League Cup final and in the 1993 FA Cup Final replay, both games against Sheffield Wednesday, as Arsenal won the Cup double that season. He scored two goals for Arsenal, both coming in the Cup Winners' Cup. His first came against Standard Liege in 1993–94 and his second against Brondby the following season.

In February 1995 Selley broke his leg playing against Leicester City, which forced him out for most of the 1996–97 season, playing just once under new manager Wenger as a late substitute against Chelsea. Despite reports that he would be a part of Arsène Wenger's new side he was sold to Fulham in 1997 for £500,000, after playing 41 games for Arsenal in the league.

=== Fulham and Wimbledon ===
Unfortunately for him, he broke his leg a second time after playing just three games for Fulham and moved to Wimbledon in July 2000. However Wimbledon were facing financial difficulties, and a bonus payment clause in his contract meant the club could not always afford to play him. Selley started just one game with three substitute appearances for Wimbledon.

=== Southend United ===
In February 2002 he was loaned to Southend United, where he enjoyed more success, playing fourteen games in the 2000–01 season. He went on loan to Southend again in the 2002–03 season, playing 11 times. In all he played more than 30 times for Southend in all competitions.

=== Woking ===
Selley was released by Wimbledon in May 2003, and signed for Woking where he became an integral member of the team. Despite an injury against Kettering Town in the FA Trophy in 2004 which kept him out for ten games, he featured consistently and earned a reputation as a dead-ball specialist – he converted six goals from the spot in the 2003–04 season and two free kicks. At the start of the 2005–06 season his form was rather indifferent and it was revealed that he was recovering from a hernia operation. This did not prevent him from playing and he signed another one-year deal to keep him at Woking and provide much needed experience as the club sought a play-off place for promotion from the Conference National to The Football League.

He picked up nine yellow cards in his time at Southend United and picked up 10 bookings in his first season at Woking, six the season after that and four in the following season. Injury ruled him out of much of the 2006–07 season, and he was eventually released by Woking at the end of the season.

=== Further non-League career ===
Following his release from Kingfield Stadium, Selley joined Lewes in July 2007. In September 2007, Sam Jeremiah of St Francis Rangers FC pulled away from Selley at the near post to head in the equaliser in what was eventually a 4–1 defeat. He then signed non-contract terms for Grays Athletic on 22 November 2007, reportedly wanting first team football. It was revealed that Sutton United manager, Ernie Howe, tried to sign Selley as a player-coach but he proved to be too expensive.

Selley left Grays Athletic to join Isthmian League Premier Division side Maidstone United on 7 March 2008, helping them to avoid relegation. He then joined Croydon Athletic in December 2008. Selley's next move was to Conference South club Dorchester Town before his release in January 2010. After his release in January 2010, he signed for Havant & Waterlooville, where he made a good impression. He was released in July 2011. He later signed for Kingstonian. During his time at Kingstonian, he had loan spells at Chertsey Town and Whyteleafe. He ended his playing career in the summer of 2012 and was appointed as the new head coach at Arsenal Soccer Schools Dubai. In 2021, he came out of retirement to play for non-league Dial Square at the age of 48.

On 19 December 2023, Selley, having been appointed manager at Westfield in the Isthmian League Division One South and registered himself as a player, made his debut for the club at the age of 49, playing most of the second half in a 2–4 defeat to Ashford United in the Velocity Cup. Two months later, on 20 February 2024, he made another cup appearance, this time as an 87th-minute substitute in a 2-0 win against Midhurst & Easebourne in the first round of the Aldershot Senior Cup.

== International career ==
Selley earned a bronze medal as a member of the squad that won third place at the FIFA World Youth Championship, now known as the Under 20 World cup, of 1993 that was held in Australia.

== Managerial career ==
On 1 November 2021, Selley was appointed as manager of his home town club Chertsey Town. He departed the club in May 2022 after leading the team to the Isthmian South Central play-off final. He was previously in charge of Sandhurst Town.

In November 2022, Selley was appointed manager of Hartley Wintney. He was sacked by the club in January 2023.

On 25 February 2023, Selley was confirmed as the new first team manager of Westfield (Surrey).

On 16 May 2024, Selley's resignation as Westfield manager was announced, appointed as the new manager of Leatherhead the same day.

On 6 April 2026 following a 1-1 draw with Met Police Leatherhead were crowned champions of the Isthmian League South Central Division:

== Honours ==
=== As a player ===
Arsenal

- FA Cup: 1992–93
- Football League Cup: 1992–93
- UEFA Cup Winners' Cup: 1993–94

England

- FIFA World Youth Championship third place: 1993

=== As a manager ===
Leatherhead

- Isthmian League South Central Division: 2025–26
