= Heikki Haara =

Finnish footballer (born 1982)

Personal information
- Date of birth: 20 November 1982 (age 43)
- Place of birth: Lahti, Finland
- Height: 1.86 m (6 ft 1 in)
- Position: Defender

Team information
- Current team: FC Lahti
- Number: 2

Senior career*
Years	Team	Apps	(Gls)
2000–2002	Wimbledon		
2002	Lahti	20	(0)
2003	Jokerit	26	(0)
2004	Allianssi	23	(0)
2005–2012	Lahti	95	(2)
- * Club domestic league appearances and goals as of 15 July 2010

Heikki Haara (born 20 November 1982) is a Finnish former football player. He formerly played for Wimbledon F.C.,
