= Pär Karlsson =

Swedish footballer, scout, and manager

Personal information
- Date of birth: 29 May 1978 (age 47)
- Place of birth: Sweden
- Position: Midfielder

Senior career*
Years	Team	Apps	(Gls)
1994	KB Karlskoga FF		
1995-2000	IFK Göteborg		
2000-2003	Wimbledon F.C.	26	(0)
2002-2003	IF Elfsborg		
- * Club domestic league appearances and goals

Pär Karlsson (born 29 May 1978 in Sweden) is a Swedish retired footballer who now works as a scout and manager.

== Career ==
Karlsson started his senior career with KB Karlskoga in 1994. In 2000, he signed for Wimbledon in the English Football League First Division, where he made 32 appearances and scored one goal. After that, he played for Swedish club IF Elfsborg before retiring in 2003.
