= Andy Roberts (footballer) =

English footballer

Personal information
- Full name: Andrew James Roberts
- Date of birth: 20 March 1974 (age 52)
- Place of birth: Dartford, England
- Height: 5 ft 10 in (1.78 m)
- Position: Midfielder

Youth career
- ?–1991: Millwall

Senior career*
| Years | Team | Apps | (Gls) |
| 1991–1995 | Millwall | 138 | (5) |
| 1995–1998 | Crystal Palace | 108 | (2) |
| 1998–2002 | Wimbledon | 101 | (6) |
| 2002 | → Norwich City (loan) | 5 | (0) |
| 2002–2004 | Millwall | 66 | (3) |
| Total | | 418 | (16) |

International career
| 1995 | England U21 | 5 | (0) |
- * Club domestic league appearances and goals as of 20:59, 12 March 2008 (UTC)

Andrew James Roberts (born 20 March 1974 in Dartford) is an English retired footballer who played as a midfielder.

== Career ==
Roberts began his career at Millwall in 1991. In 1995, he moved to Crystal Palace, where he was the club's Player of the Year in 1996. In 1998, he signed for Wimbledon, where he stayed until 2002. He had a loan spell at Norwich City in that year before returning to Millwall. During his second spell at Millwall he helped them reach the 2004 FA Cup Final, playing in their semi-final triumph over Sunderland. However he missed the final because of injury. He retired from playing in 2004, aged 30.

He was also capped five times by the England U21 team during the mid-1990s.

== Honours ==
Crystal Palace

- Football League First Division play-offs: 1997

Sporting positions
| Preceded by Gareth Southgate | Crystal Palace captain 1995–1997 | Succeeded by Andy Linighan |
