= Des Byrne =

Irish footballer

Personal information
- Full name: Desmond Byrne
- Date of birth: 10 April 1981 (age 45)
- Place of birth: Dublin, Ireland
- Height: 5 ft 10 in (1.78 m)
- Positions: Left-back; centre-back; left midfielder

Senior career*
Years	Team	Apps	(Gls)
1998–1999	Stockport County	1	(0)
1999–2000	St Patrick's Athletic	30	(1)
2000–2002	Wimbledon	1	(0)
2001	→ Cambridge United (loan)	4	(0)
2002–2004	Carlisle United	21	(0)
2003–2004	St Patrick's Athletic	18	(0)
2004–2007	Bohemians	62	(1)
2008–2009	St Patrick's Athletic	22	(0)
- * Club domestic league appearances and goals as of 02/02/2009

Desmond "Des" Byrne (born 10 April 1981) is an Irish footballer. He is primarily deployed as a left-back, but has also appeared as a central defender or as a midfielder.

== Career ==
Byrne began his career at Stockport County making his debut in the 1998–99 season. He returned to Ireland where he joined St Patrick's Athletic and put in many fine performances. Wimbledon splashed out to take him back to England but he never established himself at the club, making just one appearance as a late substitute against Barnsley. While at Wimbledon, he found himself in the news when involved in an incident at a West London nightclub with Chelsea's Jody Morris and John Terry. He was found guilty of possessing an offensive weapon and fined £2,000. He was also ordered to pay costs of £1,000. He had spells at Cambridge United on loan and Carlisle United before once again returning to St Patrick's Athletic.

In December 2004, he signed for Bohemians on a three-year deal. In June 2005, he scored in the UEFA Intertoto Cup.

Byrne was released by Bohs at the end of their 2007 season and signed for St Pats for a third spell soon after.

Currently living in London since 2009, Byrne has recently set up a football agency Clique Sports Management with James Park.
