= Paul Robinson (footballer, born November 1978) =

English footballer

Personal information
- Full name: Paul Derrick Robinson
- Date of birth: 20 November 1978 (age 47)
- Place of birth: Sunderland, England
- Position: Striker

Youth career
- 1994–1996: Darlington

Senior career*
Years	Team	Apps	(Gls)
1996–1998	Darlington	27	(3)
1998–2000	Newcastle United	11	(0)
2000–2003	Wimbledon	4	(0)
2000	→ Burnley (loan)	3	(0)
2001	→ Dundee United (loan)	6	(0)
2002	→ Grimsby Town (loan)	5	(0)
2002	→ Grimsby Town (loan)	12	(1)
2002–2003	→ Carlisle United (loan)	5	(1)
2003	Blackpool	7	(1)
2003–2004	Hartlepool United	31	(7)
2004–2005	York City	26	(4)
2005	Whitley Bay	8	(0)
2005–2006	Torquay United	21	(3)
2006–2007	Horden Colliery Welfare	7	(2)
2008–2009	Consett		
2009–2010	Maidenhead United		
2010	Hayes & Yeading United	0	(0)
2010	Hendon		
2010–2011	Windsor & Eton		
2011	Beaconsfield SYCOB		
2011	Chesham United		
2011	Jarrow Roofing		
2011	Chesham United		
2011–2012	Didcot Town		
2012	Jarrow Roofing		
2012	Newton Aycliffe		
2012	Jarrow Roofing		
2012–2013	South Shields		
2013	Hebburn Town		
2015	Ashbrooke Sports Club		
2016	Dunston UTS		
- * Club domestic league appearances and goals as of 17:24, 15 May 2007 (UTC)

Paul Derrick Robinson (born 20 November 1978) is an English footballer who has had a career in league and non-league football. He played in the Premier League for Newcastle United. Robinson is a much-travelled player, having featured for over twenty teams in his career. Due to his frequent moving, he has only passed thirty league appearances for one club, during his time with Hartlepool United who he played for in EFL League One.

== Club career ==
=== Darlington ===
Robinson was born in Sunderland, Tyne and Wear and began his career as a trainee with Darlington, making his debut, as a late substitute for Robbie Blake in a 4–1 win away to Runcorn in the FA Cup first round on 16 November 1996. His league debut came a week later, this time as a second-half substitute for Glenn Naylor in a 3–2 defeat away to Scunthorpe United. He played once more that season and was a regular substitute the following campaign.

=== Newcastle United ===
In March 1998, Robinson moved to Premier League side Newcastle United, along with teammate James Coppinger as part of a £500,000 deal. He made his Magpies debut on 7 August 1999, as a late substitute for Nolberto Solano in a 1–0 defeat at home to Aston Villa and made his first start in the 3–3 draw at home to Wimbledon later that month. His start in the next game was controversial. Boyhood Sunderland fan Robinson was selected by manager Ruud Gullit ahead of £22million strikeforce Alan Shearer and Duncan Ferguson in the infamous 2–1 home derby defeat against Sunderland. Robinson set up Newcastle's goal, but refused to celebrate it due to his allegiance to Sunderland. Gullit lost his job the following day. After Bobby Robson took over as manager, Robinson played just 11 more times (all as a substitute), but did score his first senior goal for the team in a 2–2 UEFA Cup tie against CSKA Sofia.

=== Wimbledon ===
In July 2000 he moved down to the First Division with Wimbledon for a fee of £1.5 million. Robinson made just four league appearances in his three years with the Dons, spending time on loan with Burnley and Dundee United before joining Grimsby Town on loan towards the end of the 2001–02 season. Robinson re-joined Grimsby for the first three months of the 2002–03 season, scoring once against Sheffield United, but failed to do enough to earn himself a permanent transfer. After this he went on to play for Carlisle United on loan. His first goal for the club came in a 2–1 league defeat to York City. He also scored in their Football League Trophy run, in a 2–0 win over Wrexham. Carlisle made it to the final, but Robinson had already returned to Wimbledon before being released from the Selhurst Park club in March 2003.

=== Blackpool ===
He moved to Blackpool on a free transfer in March 2003 following his release by The Dons, he managed to score once against Notts County, before leaving several months later.

=== Hartlepool United ===
In July 2003 Robinson signed for Hartlepool United, where he scored seven league goals during the 2003–04 season, three of them coming in a memorable hat trick against his former club Grimsby, during an 8–1 win over The Mariners.

=== York City ===
In June 2004, he moved to York City. After the completion of the 2004–05 season, Robinson was released by York.

=== Whitley Bay ===
In July 2005 he was poised to sign for Ross County. However, he rejected a contract with the Dingwall side and the following month had an unsuccessful trial with Aberdeen, after which he was said to be considering quitting football after becoming disillusioned with the game. In August 2005, he returned to the North East of the England, signing for non-league side Whitley Bay.

=== Torquay United ===
Robinson returned to the professional game, signing for League Two side Torquay United in November 2005. He was a regular squad member for the rest of the season, but was released after Torquay had secured survival on the final day of the season.

=== Non-League football ===
Following his departure from Torquay, Robinson returned north and transferred to lowly non-League side Horden Colliery Welfare. Robinson then joined Consett AFC for the 2008–09 season, but left the club at the end of the season. In 2010 Robinson found himself under the guidance of James Batney at THORPE PARK Resort, where he scored in every round of the Chessington World Cup, bringing the trophy back to F.I.M.A. FC's cabinet for the second time. Robinson then spent short spells at a number of non-league clubs across England, turning out for Maidenhead United, Hayes & Yeading, Windsor & Eton, Beaconsfield and Chesham United. Robinson then signed for South Tyneside based Jarrow Roofing Boldon Community Association F.C. who play in the Northern League Division One. He scored a hat-trick on his debut against Billingham Town F.C. and followed this with two goals in a 2–2 draw with West Auckland Town F.C. Despite enjoying a successful spell with Jarrow Roofing, scoring nine goals in his first seven games, Robinson abruptly left the club at the end of September 2011 and returned to Chesham United.

On 22 November 2011, it was reported that Robinson had left Chesham United and signed for Southern Football League side Didcot Town. In an interview with BBC Radio Oxford in December 2011 Robinson stated that he was happy to have signed for Didcot Town and was looking forward to the challenge of playing in the Southern League saying "I just want to play. It was a massive attraction to join up with [manager] Dave Mudge ... The ground and training facilities here are great, especially for this level. I jumped at the chance to come." However, Robinson was dropped from the Didcot squad for a game against Poole Town in February 2012, and left the club shortly after. It was then revealed that Robinson had moved back to the North East and re-signed for Jarrow Roofing. He scored on his second debut for the club in a 3–2 win over South Shields and then scored twice in the next match against Sunderland RCA. It was also revealed that as well as being on the playing staff Robinson had been given a coaching role with the club by manager Richie McLoughlin, who is also the chairman, treasurer, owner and chief sponsor of the club. However, Jarrow Roofing finished the 2011–12 season in 20th place on equal points with Penrith F.C. but were relegated to the Northern League Division Two on goal difference. Following this Robinson left the club and joined County Durham-based Newton Aycliffe F.C., who had finished the season in mid-table and would therefore play the 2012–13 season in Northern League Division One. Robinson's spell with the Newtonians was initially successful, as he scored a few minutes into his debut in an FA Cup tie against Holker Old Boys, and added a second goal when he scored in a 4–1 defeat by Hebburn Town.

However, it would turn out to be another short spell at a club for Robinson, as it was announced in September 2012 that after just seven appearances for his new club he had left Newton Aycliffe and had yet again returned to Jarrow Roofing for a third spell at the club. Roofing manager Richie McLoughlin was enthusiastic about Robinson's return to the club and praised his abilities, telling a local newspaper: "I'm hoping Robbo will give us some more firepower. He was dying to come back...we also needed his presence in the changing room, as well as on the pitch." Yet again Robinson spent a short amount of time at Jarrow Roofing. In a game against Whitley Bay McLoughlin substituted off Robinson after just twenty minutes, stating "We were getting overrun after 20 minutes and Robbo was not at his best, and you need 11 men on the ball against a team like Whitley, so I took him off and put Dan Carson on. We looked better and got back into the game." The South Shields Gazette reported that this caused a "bust up" between Robinson and McLoughlin, and on 23 November it was reported that Robinson had left Jarrow Roofing – his third spell at the club lasting just a few weeks. In early December 2012 it was revealed that Robinson had signed for South Shields, although he left the team after a short period of time and signed for Hebburn Town. In an interview with David Bowers of Sky Sports in 2013 Robinson revealed that he no longer played football and preferred to spend his time working for his family. However, in 2015 Robinson signed for Ashbrooke Sports Club who play in the third division of the Sunderland Sunday League. He scored four goals on his debut in a 10–2 win against Penshaw CC FC.

In July 2016 Robinson scored four goals for a Newcastle United XI in a memorial game for former goalkeeper Pavel Srnicek who died in December 2015. The team included other former Newcastle United players Paul Brayson and Jamie McClen and was attended by over 1,000 fans. Following the game Robinson revealed that he had been asked to train with Gateshead-based Dunston UTS F.C. In August 2016 he signed for the club.

== Personal life ==
On 8 January 2007, Robinson was declared bankrupt at Sunderland County Court. Although the total amount of debt Robinson was in was not revealed, it was stated that he had agreed to pay his creditors £400 per month but had fallen behind with these repayments and did not oppose being made bankrupt. It was also reported that Robinson had moved back into his parents house in the Seaburn area of Sunderland.

Robinson reflected on the bad financial decisions which had led to his bankruptcy. He described that following his move to Wimbledon he felt homesick and pressurised by the £1.5 million fee the club had paid for him. During this time he began spending money excessively. "The amount I'd spend was ridiculous. I'd buy clothes for no reason whatsoever. I couldn't go past a shop without going in and splashing out...Then there were the gadgets, the car...stuff every lad would buy if he could afford it." Robinson went on to say that as his career floundered and he began dropping down the leagues he still continued spending, culminating in his being declared bankrupt shortly after he left Torquay United.

In the same interview he went on to say that his selection in the starting line-up for the infamous Tyne-Wear derby was a case of "too much, too young" and said that he would have preferred to play in that game when he was 26 or 27, rather than 20. In another interview with Sky Sports in 2013 Robinson stated that joining Wimbledon was "by far the worst decision I've ever made" and said that he should have stayed under the guidance of Sir Bobby Robson at Newcastle.

Robinson expressed regret at the way he had squandered the money he made from football stating "I look back and wish I'd bought a house and ended up with something to show for my career" but accepted that it was his own decisions that led to his failure to fulfill his footballing potential saying "I haven't quite hit the heights I should have. But the only person to blame is the idiot looking back at me in the mirror."

Robinson worked as a multi-drop driver for courier firm City Link operating out of the company's Durham depot until the company collapsed in December 2014.

In 2020, he set up his own coaching company called Strikes Coaching. In an interview with The Guardian in March 2026, Robinson stated he was still running the business and said "I’ve had my bit, but if I can give something back and make children love football, then great." He also said that he had "no regrets" about his football career.
