= Peter Hawkins (footballer) =

English footballer (born 1978)

Personal information
- Full name: Peter Steven Hawkins
- Date of birth: 18 September 1978 (age 48)
- Place of birth: Maidstone, Kent, England
- Position: Defender

Team information
- Current team: Chatham Town (assistant manager)

Senior career*
Years	Team	Apps	(Gls)
1996–2004	Wimbledon	120	(0)
2000	→ York City (loan)	14	(0)
2004–2006	Rushden & Diamonds	62	(1)
2006–2009	Ebbsfleet United	92	(1)
2009	→ Maidstone United	11	(0)
2009	→ Maidstone United	5	(0)
2009–2010	Maidstone United		
2010	Tonbridge Angels	3	(0)
2010	Maidstone United	9	(0)
2010–2011	Bly Spartans		
2011–2013	Whitstable Town		
2014–2015	Chatham Town		

Managerial career
- 2014–: Chatham Town (assistant manager)
- * Club domestic league appearances and goals as of 23:56, 14 January 2011 (UTC)

Peter Hawkins (born 18 September 1978) is an English former footballer who works as assistant manager for Chatham Town. He made over 275 senior appearances for Wimbledon, York, Rushden & Diamonds, Ebbsfleet, Maidstone and Tonbridge.

== Career ==
Born in Maidstone, Hawkins came up through the youth system at Wimbledon. He joined York City on a loan in February 2000, where he made 14 appearances in League Two in the 1999–2000 season, before breaking into the first-team at Wimbledon in the following season. He went on to make over 130 league and cup appearances for Wimbledon in four seasons. He joined Rushden & Diamonds in July 2004, for whom he started 69 games. He left the club by mutual consent in March 2006 after not featuring in the first-team since the previous December, and joined Ebbsfleet United a week later. By the end of the 2007–08 season, Hawkins had made over 80 appearances for Ebbsfleet and collected a winners medal when the Kent club won the FA Trophy at Wembley Stadium in May 2008.

Towards the back end of the 2008–09 season, Hawkins had two separate loan spells at his hometown club Maidstone United, making 16 appearances in total. After being released by Ebbsfleet in May 2009, Hawkins signed a permanent deal with Maidstone for the 2009–10 season. In June 2010 he joined Tonbridge Angels after being released by Maidstone. He rejoined Maidstone in September 2010 before leaving again a month later, where he joined up with former Stones manager Lloyd Hume at Kent County League outfit Bly Spartans. In February 2011 Hawkins returned to Isthmian League football, joining former Maidstone manager Peter Nott at Whitstable Town.

== Honours ==
- FA Trophy: 2008
