= Chris Willmott =

English footballer

Chris wmat
Personal information
- Full name: Christopher Alan Willmott
- Date of birth: 30 September 1977 (age 49)
- Place of birth: Bedford, England
- Height: 6 ft 2 in (1.88 m)
- Position: Defender

Senior career*
Years	Team	Apps	(Gls)
1995–1999	Luton Town	14	(0)
1999–2003	Wimbledon	53	(2)
2003	→ Luton Town (loan)	13	(0)
2003–2005	Northampton Town	81	(1)
2005–2009	Oxford United	98	(4)
2009–2012	Brackley Town	35	(1)
2012–2014	Oxford City	37	(1)
- * Club domestic league appearances and goals

Christopher Alan Willmott (born 30 September 1977, in Bedford, England) is an English retired footballer.

Willmott began his career at Luton Town, before a move to Wimbledon alongside teammate Kelvin Davis. He returned to Luton on loan in 2002/03, and was all set to return on a Bosman transfer in the summer of 2003 as well as fellow loanee Sammy Igoe.

However, the take-over and subsequent dismissal of the Luton management team saw Willmott join Northampton Town instead, where he scored once against Cambridge United. In the summer of 2005, Willmott joined Oxford United on a free transfer from Northampton. 'Motty' missed the majority of the 2007/08 season through a knee injury.

He was released by Oxford United at the end of the 2008/09 season. Willmott signed a two-year contract with Southern League Premier Division side Brackley Town. Willmott then played for Conference North team Oxford City where he was vice-captain.

After retiring from football he went into teaching, becoming a master at Bedford Modern School.

In 2022, Willmott joined AFC Rushden and Diamonds as assistant manager.

In October 2022, Chris Willmott joined Kettering Town FC as first team coach and assistant to the manager, Lee Glover.
