= 1990–91 Wimbledon F.C. season =

Wimbledon
1990–91 season
- Chairman: Sam Hammam
- Manager: Ray Harford
- Stadium: Plough Lane
- First Division: 8th
- FA Cup: Fourth round
- League Cup: Second round
- Full Members Cup: Second round (Southern Area)
- Top goalscorer: Fashanu (20)
- Highest home attendance: 13,733 vs Arsenal (25 Aug 1990, First Division)
- Lowest home attendance: 1,787 vs Ipswich Town (12 Dec 1990, Full Members Cup)
- Average home league attendance: 7,631
Home colours

During the 1990–91 English football season, Wimbledon F.C. competed in the Football League First Division.

== Season summary ==
In the 1990–91 season under Ray Harford's first season in charge, Warren Barton was purchased for £300,000 whilst in the league, Wimbledon had another strong season, finishing in seventh place, meaning that the Dons had now finished in the top 10 a total of four times in five seasons.

Nothing had come of the plans for a new stadium which had been unveiled in 1988, and at the end of the season, Wimbledon's board decided that Plough Lane was beyond redevelopment to meet the new FA rule requiring all-seater stadiums. Consequently, the club moved to Selhurst Park before the start of next season, ground-sharing with Crystal Palace, with the aim of returning to the London Borough of Merton by building a new stadium within a few years.

== Final league table ==
Pos	Team	Pld	W	D	L	GF	GA	GD	Pts	Qualification or relegation
1	Arsenal (C)	38	24	13	1	74	18	+56	83 (Note: Arsenal deducted two points; Manchester United deducted one point due to a brawl in a game between both teams.)	Qualification for the European Cup first round
2	Liverpool	38	23	7	8	77	40	+37	76	Qualification for the UEFA Cup first round
3	Crystal Palace	38	20	9	9	50	41	+9	69	
4	Leeds United	38	19	7	12	65	47	+18	64	
5	Manchester City	38	17	11	10	64	53	+11	62	
6	Manchester United	38	16	12	10	58	45	+13	59	Qualification for the Cup Winners' Cup first round
7	Wimbledon	38	14	14	10	53	46	+7	56	
8	Nottingham Forest	38	14	12	12	65	50	+15	54	
9	Everton	38	13	12	13	50	46	+4	51	
10	Tottenham Hotspur	38	11	16	11	51	50	+1	49	Qualification for the Cup Winners' Cup qualifying round
11	Chelsea	38	13	10	15	58	69	−11	49	
12	Queens Park Rangers	38	12	10	16	44	53	−9	46	
13	Sheffield United	38	13	7	18	36	55	−19	46	
14	Southampton	38	12	9	17	58	69	−11	45	
15	Norwich City	38	13	6	19	41	64	−23	45	
16	Coventry City	38	11	11	16	42	49	−7	44	
17	Aston Villa	38	9	14	15	46	58	−12	41	
18	Luton Town	38	10	7	21	42	61	−19	37	
19	Sunderland (R)	38	8	10	20	38	60	−22	34	Relegation to the Second Division
20	Derby County (R)	38	5	9	24	37	75	−38	24	Relegation to the Second Division

Source: World Football
Rules for classification: 1) Points; 2) Goal difference; 3) Goals scored
(C) Champions; (R) Relegated

== Results ==
Wimbledon's score comes first

=== Legend ===
Win	Draw	Loss

=== Football League First Division ===
Date	Opponent	Venue	Result	Attendance	Scorers
25 August 1990	Arsenal	H	0–3	13,733	
29 August 1990	Queens Park Rangers	A	1–0	9,762	Fashanu
1 September 1990	Derby County	A	1–1	12,469	Cotterill
8 September 1990	Liverpool	H	1–2	12,364	Cork
15 September 1990	Coventry City	A	0–0	8,925	
22 September 1990	Sunderland	H	2–2	6,143	Kruszyński, Scales
29 September 1990	Manchester City	H	1–1	6,158	Gayle
6 October 1990	Sheffield United	A	2–1	17,650	Fairweather, Fashanu
20 October 1990	Aston Villa	H	0–0	6,646	
27 October 1990	Crystal Palace	A	3–4	17,220	Fashanu, McGee (2)
3 November 1990	Southampton	H	1–1	5,485	Flowers (own goal)
10 November 1990	Tottenham Hotspur	A	2–4	28,769	McGee, Cork
17 November 1990	Chelsea	H	2–1	10,773	Nicholas (own goal), Gibson
24 November 1990	Everton	H	2–1	6,411	Barton, Gibson
1 December 1990	Norwich City	A	4–0	12,324	Fashanu (2), Barton, Scales
8 December 1990	Queens Park Rangers	H	3–0	5,358	McGee, Fashanu (2)
15 December 1990	Arsenal	A	2–2	30,163	Kruszyński, Fashanu
22 December 1990	Manchester United	H	1–3	9,744	Fashanu
26 December 1990	Nottingham Forest	A	1–2	16,221	Fashanu
29 December 1990	Leeds United	A	0–3	29,292	
1 January 1991	Luton Town	H	2–0	4,521	Fashanu, Cork
12 January 1991	Derby County	H	3–1	4,724	Gibson, Fashanu (2)
19 January 1991	Liverpool	A	1–1	35,030	Barton
2 February 1991	Coventry City	H	1–0	4,061	Gibson
16 February 1991	Chelsea	A	0–0	13,378	
23 February 1991	Tottenham Hotspur	H	5–1	10,303	McGee, Curle, Gibson, Fashanu, Cork
2 March 1991	Norwich City	H	0–0	4,041	
16 March 1991	Manchester City	A	1–1	21,089	Fashanu
23 March 1991	Sheffield United	H	1–1	7,031	Cork
30 March 1991	Nottingham Forest	H	3–1	6,392	Fashanu, McGee, Clarke
2 April 1991	Manchester United	A	1–2	36,660	Clarke
6 April 1991	Leeds United	H	0–1	6,800	
10 April 1991	Everton	A	2–1	14,590	Fashanu, Clarke
13 April 1991	Luton Town	A	1–0	8,219	Fashanu
20 April 1991	Aston Villa	A	2–1	17,001	Fashanu, Newhouse
23 April 1991	Sunderland	A	0–0	24,036	
4 May 1991	Crystal Palace	H	0–3	10,002	
11 May 1991	Southampton	A	1–1	17,052	Fashanu

=== FA Cup ===
Round	Date	Opponent	Venue	Result	Attendance	Goalscorers
R3	5 January 1991	Aston Villa	A	1–1	19,305	McGee
R3R	9 January 1991	Aston Villa	H	1–0 (a.e.t.)	7,382	Cork
R4	26 January 1991	Shrewsbury Town	A	0–1	8,269	

=== League Cup ===
Round	Date	Opponent	Venue	Result	Attendance	Goalscorers
R2 1st Leg	25 September 1990	Plymouth Argyle	A	0–1	4,506	
R2 2nd Leg	10 October 1990	Plymouth Argyle	H	0–2 (lost 0–3 on agg)	3,473	

=== Full Members Cup ===
Round	Date	Opponent	Venue	Result	Attendance	Goalscorers
SR2	12 December 1990	Ipswich Town	H	0–2	1,787	

== Squad ==
Note: Flags indicate national team as defined under FIFA eligibility rules; some limited exceptions apply. Players may hold more than one non-FIFA nationality.

Pos.	Nation	Player
GK	NED	Hans Segers
GK	SCO	Neil Sullivan
DF	ENG	Warren Barton
DF	ENG	Dean Blackwell
DF	ENG	Keith Curle
DF	ENG	Gary Elkins
DF	IRL	Scott Fitzgerald
DF	ENG	Roger Joseph
DF	SCO	Brian McAllister
DF	IRL	Terry Phelan
DF	ENG	John Scales
MF	ENG	Neal Ardley
MF	ENG	Mickey Bennett
MF	JAM	Robbie Earle

Pos.	Nation	Player
MF	ENG	Carlton Fairweather
MF	POL	Zbigniew Kruszyński
MF	IRL	Paul McGee
MF	ENG	Paul Miller
MF	ENG	Vaughan Ryan
MF	NIR	Lawrie Sanchez
FW	ENG	Steve Anthrobus
FW	ENG	Andy Clarke
FW	ENG	Alan Cork
FW	ENG	Steve Cotterill
FW	ENG	John Fashanu
FW	ENG	John Gayle
FW	ENG	Terry Gibson
FW	ENG	Aidan Newhouse

== Transfers ==
=== In ===
Date	Pos	Name	From	Fee
7 June 1990	DF	Warren Barton	Maidstone United	£300,000
20 August 1990	DF	Gary Elkins	Fulham	£20,000
21 February 1991	FW	Andy Clarke	Barnet	£250,000

=== Out ===
Date	Pos	Name	To	Fee
3 July 1990	MF	Dennis Wise	Chelsea	£1,600,000
15 August 1990	DF	Eric Young	Crystal Palace	£850,000
21 November 1990	FW	John Gayle	Birmingham City	£175,000

Transfers in: ▼£570,000
Transfers out: ▲£2,625,000
Total spending: ▲£2,055,000
