= 1991–92 Wimbledon F.C. season =

Wimbledon
1991–92 season
- Chairman: Sam Hammam
- Manager: Ray Harford (until 7 October); Peter Withe (from 7 October - 19 January); Joe Kinnear (from 19 January)
- Stadium: Selhurst Park
- First Division: 13th
- FA Cup: Third round
- League Cup: Second round
- Full Members Cup: Second round
- Top goalscorer: League: All: John Fashanu (20)
- Average home league attendance: 6,905
Home colours

During the 1991–92 English football season, Wimbledon competed in the Football League First Division. They finished the season 13th in the First Division and secured a place in the new FA Premier League for the 1992–93 season.

== Season summary ==
Wimbledon had three different managers during this season. The season began with Ray Harford as manager, but Harford resigned on 7 October 1991. He was succeeded by Peter Withe, who was in charge for just over three months before being replaced by Joe Kinnear on 19 January 1992.

Wimbledon had fallen from the top half of the First Division into the relegation battle after winning just one league game in three months under Withe, but their improved form under Kinnear ensured that their survival was achieved with several matches remaining, meaning that Wimbledon would be one of the 22 elite clubs making up the founder members of the new FA Premier League.

It was also Wimbledon’s first season as tenants of Crystal Palace at Selhurst Park, having moved out of Plough Lane with the intention of later returning to the London Borough of Merton once a site could be found to build a new stadium suitable to host top flight football.

== Final league table ==
Pos	Team	Pld	W	D	L	GF	GA	GD	Pts	Qualification or relegation
1	Leeds United (C)	42	22	16	4	74	37	+37	82	Qualification for the UEFA Champions League first round and qualification for the FA Premier League
2	Manchester United	42	21	15	6	63	33	+30	78	Qualification for the UEFA Cup first round and qualification for the FA Premier League (Note: Manchester United also won the League Cup – that UEFA Cup qualifying place was passed down to the third-placed League team.)
3	Sheffield Wednesday	42	21	12	9	62	49	+13	75	Qualification for the UEFA Cup first round and qualification for the FA Premier League
4	Arsenal	42	19	15	8	81	46	+35	72	Qualification for the FA Premier League
5	Manchester City	42	20	10	12	61	48	+13	70	Qualification for the FA Premier League
6	Liverpool	42	16	16	10	47	40	+7	64	Qualification for the European Cup Winners' Cup first round and qualification for the FA Premier League
7	Aston Villa	42	17	9	16	48	44	+4	60	Qualification for the FA Premier League
8	Nottingham Forest	42	16	11	15	60	58	+2	59	Qualification for the FA Premier League
9	Sheffield United	42	16	9	17	65	63	+2	57	Qualification for the FA Premier League
10	Crystal Palace	42	14	15	13	53	61	−8	57	Qualification for the FA Premier League
11	Queens Park Rangers	42	12	18	12	48	47	+1	54	Qualification for the FA Premier League
12	Everton	42	13	14	15	52	51	+1	53	Qualification for the FA Premier League
13	Wimbledon	42	13	14	15	53	53	0	53	Qualification for the FA Premier League
14	Chelsea	42	13	14	15	50	60	−10	53	Qualification for the FA Premier League
15	Tottenham Hotspur	42	15	7	20	58	63	−5	52	Qualification for the FA Premier League
16	Southampton	42	14	10	18	39	55	−16	52	Qualification for the FA Premier League
17	Oldham Athletic	42	14	9	19	63	67	−4	51	Qualification for the FA Premier League
18	Norwich City	42	11	12	19	47	63	−16	45	Qualification for the FA Premier League
19	Coventry City	42	11	11	20	35	44	−9	44	Qualification for the FA Premier League
20	Luton Town (R)	42	10	12	20	38	71	−33	42	Relegation to the First Division (Note: From the 1992–93 season, the first tier became the Premier League, and the second tier, then known as the Second Division, was renamed to the First Division.)
21	Notts County (R)	42	10	10	22	40	62	−22	40	Relegation to the First Division
22	West Ham United (R)	42	9	11	22	37	59	−22	38	Relegation to the First Division

Source: World Football
Rules for classification: 1) Points; 2) Goal difference; 3) Goals scored
(C) Champions; (R) Relegated

== Results ==
Wimbledon's score comes first

=== Legend ===
Win	Draw	Loss

=== Football League First Division ===
Date	Opponent	Venue	Result	Attendance	Scorers
17 August 1991	Chelsea	A	2–2	22,574	Fashanu, Earle
24 August 1991	West Ham United	H	2–0	10,081	Earle, Fashanu
27 August 1991	Crystal Palace	A	2–3	16,736	Fashanu, Earle
31 August 1991	Coventry City	A	1–0	9,469	Cork
3 September 1991	Manchester United	H	1–2	13,824	Fashanu
7 September 1991	Luton Town	H	3–0	3,231	Clarke, Ryan (2)
14 September 1991	Nottingham Forest	A	2–4	19,707	Fashanu, McGee
18 September 1991	Southampton	A	0–1	11,280	
21 September 1991	Tottenham Hotspur	H	3–5	11,927	Fashanu, Cork, Bennett
28 September 1991	Sheffield United	A	0–0	16,062	
2 October 1991	Sheffield Wednesday	H	2–1	3,121	Blackwell, Newhouse
5 October 1991	Norwich City	H	3–1	3,531	Fitzgerald, Fashanu, Clarke
19 October 1991	Queens Park Rangers	H	0–1	4,133	
26 October 1991	Aston Villa	A	1–2	16,928	Fashanu
2 November 1991	Leeds United	H	0–0	7,025	
16 November 1991	Everton	A	0–2	18,762	
23 November 1991	Liverpool	H	0–0	13,373	
30 November 1991	Manchester City	A	0–0	22,429	
7 December 1991	Oldham Athletic	H	2–1	4,011	Earle (2)
21 December 1991	Sheffield Wednesday	A	0–2	20,574	
26 December 1991	Crystal Palace	H	1–1	15,009	Barton
28 December 1991	Coventry City	H	1–1	3,270	Earle
1 January 1992	Arsenal	A	1–1	26,339	Miller
11 January 1992	West Ham United	A	1–1	18,485	Sanchez
18 January 1992	Chelsea	H	1–2	8,413	Earle
1 February 1992	Queens Park Rangers	A	1–1	9,194	Fashanu
8 February 1992	Aston Villa	H	2–0	5,534	Fashanu, Phelan
22 February 1992	Manchester City	H	2–1	5,802	Fashanu, Earle
25 February 1992	Notts County	A	1–1	6,192	Fashanu (pen)
29 February 1992	Oldham Athletic	A	1–0	12,166	McGee
7 March 1992	Notts County	H	2–0	4,196	Fashanu, Earle
10 March 1992	Everton	H	0–0	3,569	
14 March 1992	Leeds United	A	1–5	26,760	Miller
21 March 1992	Manchester United	A	0–0	45,428	
28 March 1992	Arsenal	H	1–3	11,299	Earle
2 April 1992	Nottingham Forest	H	3–0	3,542	Earle, Fashanu (2)
4 April 1992	Luton Town	A	1–2	7,753	Fashanu
8 April 1992	Liverpool	A	3–2	26,134	Sanchez, Clarke, Fashanu (pen)
18 April 1992	Tottenham Hotspur	A	2–3	23,934	Earle, Sanchez
20 April 1992	Southampton	H	0–1	4,025	
25 April 1992	Norwich City	A	1–1	11,061	Elkins
2 May 1992	Sheffield United	H	3–0	8,768	Earle (2), Fashanu

=== FA Cup ===
Round	Date	Opponent	Venue	Result	Attendance	Goalscorers
R3	4 January 1992	Bristol City	A	1–1	12,679	Fashanu
R3R	14 January 1992	Bristol City	H	0–1	3,747	

=== League Cup ===
Round	Date	Opponent	Venue	Result	Attendance	Goalscorers
R2 1st leg	24 September 1991	Peterborough United	H	1–2	2,081	
R2 2nd leg	8 October 1991	Peterborough United	A	2–2 (lost 3–4 on agg)	5,939	

=== Full Members Cup ===
Round	Date	Opponent	Venue	Result	Attendance	Goalscorers
SR2	23 October 1991	Brighton & Hove Albion	A	2–3	3,291	

== Squad ==
Note: Flags indicate national team as defined under FIFA eligibility rules; some limited exceptions apply. Players may hold more than one non-FIFA nationality.

Pos.	Nation	Player
GK	NED	Hans Segers
GK	ENG	Neil Sullivan
DF	ENG	Dean Blackwell
DF	ENG	Gary Elkins
DF	IRL	Scott Fitzgerald
DF	ENG	Roger Joseph
DF	SCO	Brian McAllister
DF	ENG	Chris Perry
DF	ENG	Terry Phelan
DF	ENG	John Scales
MF	ENG	Neal Ardley
MF	ENG	Warren Barton
MF	ENG	Mickey Bennett
MF	ENG	Stewart Castledine
MF	ENG	Gerald Dobbs
MF	JAM	Robbie Earle

Pos.	Nation	Player
MF	ENG	Carlton Fairweather
MF	ENG	Martin Hayes (on loan from Celtic)
MF	POL	Zbigniew Kruszyński
MF	IRL	Paul McGee
MF	ENG	Paul Miller
MF	ENG	Vaughan Ryan
MF	NIR	Lawrie Sanchez
MF	ENG	Steve Talboys
FW	ENG	Steve Anthrobus
FW	ENG	Andy Clarke
FW	ENG	Alan Cork
FW	ENG	Steve Cotterill
FW	ENG	John Fashanu
FW	ENG	Terry Gibson
FW	ENG	Aidan Newhouse

== Transfers ==
=== In ===
Date	Pos	Name	From	Fee
19 July 1991	MF	Robbie Earle	Port Vale	£775,000
10 January 1992	MF	Steve Talboys	Gloucester City	£10,000

=== Out ===
Date	Pos	Name	To	Fee
14 August 1991	DF	Keith Curle	Manchester City	£2,500,000

Transfers in: ▼£785,000
Transfers out: ▲£2,500,000
Total spending: ▲£1,715,000
