= 1992–93 Wimbledon F.C. season =

Wimbledon
1992–93 season
- Chairman: Sam Hammam
- Manager: Joe Kinnear
- Stadium: Selhurst Park
- FA Premier League: 12th
- FA Cup: Fifth round
- League Cup: Third round
- Top goalscorer: Holdsworth (19)
- Average home league attendance: 8,405
Home colours	Away colours

During the 1992–93 English football season, Wimbledon F.C. competed in the inaugural season of the FA Premier League, their seventh successive season of top-division football and the 16th since their election to the Football League.

== Season summary ==
1992–93 began as a struggle for Wimbledon, with the club third from bottom on Boxing Day. However, the team recovered well in the new year and finished the season in a comfortable 12th place - five places above defending champions Leeds United.

Highlights of the season included a 4–0 home win over South London rivals Crystal Palace, a crushing win over Oldham Athletic (5–2 at home), doing the double over Liverpool (2–0 home, 3–2 away) and a shock 1–0 away win over that season's champions, Manchester United. Striker Dean Holdsworth scored 19 league goals for the club to finish the season as one of the Premier League's top goalscorers.

== Kit ==
Wimbledon's kit was manufactured by English company Admiral. The kits carried no sponsorship for the season.

== Final league table ==
Pos	Team	Pld	W	D	L	GF	GA	GD	Pts	Qualification or relegation
10	Arsenal	42	15	11	16	40	38	+2	56	Qualification for the Cup Winners' Cup first round (Note: Arsenal qualified by winning the FA Cup and therefore did not take up their UEFA Cup spot for winning the League Cup, which reverted to the league.)
11	Chelsea	42	14	14	14	51	54	−3	56	
12	Wimbledon	42	14	12	16	56	55	+1	54	
13	Everton	42	15	8	19	53	55	−2	53	
14	Sheffield United	42	14	10	18	54	53	+1	52	

Source: Premier League
Rules for classification: 1) points; 2) goal difference; 3) number of goals scored.

== Results ==
Wimbledon's score comes first

=== Legend ===
Win	Draw	Loss

=== FA Premier League ===
Date	Opponent	Venue	Result	Attendance	Scorers
15 August 1992	Leeds United	A	1–2	25,795	Barton
18 August 1992	Ipswich Town	H	0–1	4,954	
22 August 1992	Coventry City	H	1–2	3,759	Holdsworth
25 August 1992	Sheffield United	A	2–2	15,463	Barton, Holdsworth
29 August 1992	Everton	A	0–0	18,118	
1 September 1992	Manchester City	H	0–1	4,714	
5 September 1992	Arsenal	H	3–2	12,906	Sanchez, Fashanu, Earle
12 September 1992	Ipswich Town	A	1–2	13,333	Holdsworth
19 September 1992	Blackburn Rovers	H	1–1	6,117	Ardley
26 September 1992	Liverpool	A	3–2	29,574	Fashanu, Earle (2)
3 October 1992	Aston Villa	H	2–3	6,849	Miller, Clarke
17 October 1992	Southampton	A	2–2	11,221	Cotterill (2)
25 October 1992	Tottenham Hotspur	H	1–1	8,628	Gibson
31 October 1992	Manchester United	A	1–0	32,622	Sanchez
7 November 1992	Queens Park Rangers	H	0–2	6,771	
21 November 1992	Middlesbrough	A	0–2	14,524	
28 November 1992	Sheffield Wednesday	H	1–1	5,740	Jones (pen)
5 December 1992	Norwich City	A	1–2	14,161	Sanchez
12 December 1992	Oldham Athletic	H	5–2	3,386	Ardley (2), Holdsworth (2), Clarke
20 December 1992	Nottingham Forest	A	1–1	19,326	Clarke
26 December 1992	Crystal Palace	A	0–2	16,825	
28 December 1992	Chelsea	H	0–0	14,687	
9 January 1993	Blackburn Rovers	A	0–0	14,504	
16 January 1993	Liverpool	H	2–0	11,294	Fashanu (pen), Cotterill
26 January 1993	Everton	H	1–3	3,039	Fashanu
30 January 1993	Coventry City	A	2–0	11,774	Holdsworth, Clarke
6 February 1993	Leeds United	H	1–0	6,704	Holdsworth
10 February 1993	Arsenal	A	1–0	18,253	Holdsworth
20 February 1993	Sheffield United	H	2–0	3,979	Fashanu, Dobbs
27 February 1993	Aston Villa	A	0–1	34,496	
6 March 1993	Southampton	H	1–2	4,534	Holdsworth
9 March 1993	Middlesbrough	H	2–0	5,821	Scales, Holdsworth
13 March 1993	Queens Park Rangers	A	2–1	12,270	Fashanu, Earle
20 March 1993	Norwich City	H	3–0	10,875	Holdsworth (2), Ardley
24 March 1993	Sheffield Wednesday	A	1–1	20,918	Holdsworth
3 April 1993	Oldham Athletic	A	2–6	11,606	Holdsworth (2)
9 April 1993	Crystal Palace	H	4–0	12,275	Earle (2), Holdsworth (2)
12 April 1993	Chelsea	A	2–4	13,138	Holdsworth, Sanchez
17 April 1993	Nottingham Forest	H	1–0	9,358	Clarke
21 April 1993	Manchester City	A	1–1	19,524	Miller
1 May 1993	Tottenham Hotspur	A	1–1	24,473	Earle
9 May 1993	Manchester United	H	1–2	30,115	Holdsworth

=== FA Cup ===
Round	Date	Opponent	Venue	Result	Attendance	Goalscorers
R3	2 January 1993	Everton	H	0–0	7,818	
R3R	12 January 1993	Everton	A	2–1	15,293	Earle, Fashanu
R4	23 January 1993	Aston Villa	A	1–1	21,008	Elkins
R4R	3 February 1993	Aston Villa	H	0–0 (won 6–5 on pens)	8,048	
R5	14 February 1993	Tottenham Hotspur	A	2–3	26,594	Cotterill, Dobbs

=== League Cup ===
Round	Date	Opponent	Venue	Result	Attendance	Goalscorers
R2 First Leg	22 September 1992	Bolton Wanderers	A	3–1	5,049	Fashanu, Jones, Ardley
R2 Second Leg	6 October 1992	Bolton Wanderers	H	0–1 (won 3–2 on agg)	1,987	
R3	28 October 1992	Everton	A	0–0	9,541	
R3R	10 November 1992	Everton	H	0–1	3,686	

== Players ==
=== First-team squad ===
Note: Flags indicate national team as defined under FIFA eligibility rules; some limited exceptions apply. Players may hold more than one non-FIFA nationality.

Pos.	Nation	Player
GK	ENG	Perry Digweed
GK	ENG	Neil Sullivan (Note: Sullivan was born in Sutton, England, but also qualified to represent Scotland internationally and would make his international debut for Scotland in 1997.)
GK	NED	Hans Segers
DF	ENG	Warren Barton
DF	ENG	Dean Blackwell
DF	ENG	Gary Elkins
DF	ENG	Roger Joseph
DF	ENG	Alan McLeary (on loan from Millwall)
DF	ENG	Chris Perry
DF	ENG	John Scales (captain)
DF	SCO	Brian McAllister
DF	IRL	Scott Fitzgerald (Note: Fitzgerald was born in Westminster, England, but also qualified to represent the Republic of Ireland internationally and represented them at U-21 and B level.)
DF	IRL	Terry Phelan (Note: Phelan was born in Manchester, England, but also qualified to represent the Republic of Ireland internationally and made his international debut for the Republic of Ireland in 1991.)
MF	ENG	Neal Ardley
MF	ENG	Greg Berry
MF	ENG	Stewart Castledine
MF	ENG	Gerald Dobbs

Pos.	Nation	Player
MF	ENG	Robbie Earle (Note: Earle was born in Newcastle-under-Lyme, England, and was called up for England without playing, but also qualified to represent Jamaica internationally and would make his international debut for Jamaica in 1997.)
MF	ENG	Peter Fear
MF	ENG	Vinnie Jones (Note: Jones was born in Watford, England, but also qualified to represent Wales internationally through his maternal grandfather and would make his international debut for Wales in December 1994.)
MF	ENG	Paul Miller
MF	ENG	Justin Skinner
MF	ENG	Steve Talboys
MF	NIR	Lawrie Sanchez (Note: Sanchez was born in Lambeth, England, and represented them at schoolboy level, but also qualified to represent Ecuador internationally through his father and Northern Ireland internationally through his mother and made his international debut for Northern Ireland in 1986.)
MF	IRL	Paul McGee
FW	ENG	Leighton Allen
FW	ENG	Steve Anthrobus
FW	ENG	Andy Clarke
FW	ENG	Steve Cotterill
FW	ENG	John Fashanu
FW	ENG	Terry Gibson
FW	ENG	Dean Holdsworth
FW	ENG	Aidan Newhouse
