= 1989–90 Wimbledon F.C. season =

Wimbledon F.C.
1989–90 season
- Manager: Bobby Gould
- Football League First Division: 8th
- FA Cup: Third Round
- League Cup: Fourth Round
- Full Members' Cup: Third Round

This article documents the 1989–90 season of football club Wimbledon F.C..

The club finished eighth in the First Division and lost just nine league fixtures all season. Only champions Liverpool suffered fewer defeats, but the Dons drew almost half of their 38 league games, which prevented them from challenging for the title. It was the last season in charge of the club for manager Bobby Gould, who stepped down that summer after three seasons in charge, having guided Wimbledon to a famous FA Cup triumph in 1988.

== League table ==
Pos	Team	Pld	W	D	L	GF	GA	GD	Pts	Qualification or relegation
1	Liverpool (C)	38	23	10	5	78	37	+41	79	Disqualified from the European Cup (Note: Liverpool were banned by UEFA from its competitions from the season 1985–86 on for 10 years, because of the Heysel Stadium disaster in 1985, involving Liverpool fans. The ban was eventually lifted for the 1991–92 season.)
2	Aston Villa	38	21	7	10	57	38	+19	70	Qualification for the UEFA Cup first round
3	Tottenham Hotspur	38	19	6	13	59	47	+12	63	
4	Arsenal	38	18	8	12	54	38	+16	62	
5	Chelsea	38	16	12	10	58	50	+8	60	
6	Everton	38	17	8	13	57	46	+11	59	
7	Southampton	38	15	10	13	71	63	+8	55	
8	Wimbledon	38	13	16	9	47	40	+7	55	
9	Nottingham Forest	38	15	9	14	55	47	+8	54	
10	Norwich City	38	13	14	11	44	42	+2	53	
11	Queens Park Rangers	38	13	11	14	45	44	+1	50	
12	Coventry City	38	14	7	17	39	59	−20	49	
13	Manchester United	38	13	9	16	46	47	−1	48	Qualification for the European Cup Winners' Cup first round (Note: Manchester United qualified for the UEFA Cup Winners' Cup as the 1989–90 FA Cup winners.)
14	Manchester City	38	12	12	14	43	52	−9	48	
15	Crystal Palace	38	13	9	16	42	66	−24	48	
16	Derby County	38	13	7	18	43	40	+3	46	
17	Luton Town	38	10	13	15	43	57	−14	43	
18	Sheffield Wednesday (R)	38	11	10	17	35	51	−16	43	Relegation to the Second Division
19	Charlton Athletic (R)	38	7	9	22	31	57	−26	30	Relegation to the Second Division
20	Millwall (R)	38	5	11	22	39	65	−26	26	Relegation to the Second Division

Source: World Football
Rules for classification: 1) Points; 2) Goal difference; 3) Goals scored
(C) Champions; (R) Relegated

== Results ==
=== First Division ===
19 August 1989 1	Wimbledon	0–1	Chelsea	London
			Wilson 80'	Stadium: Plough Lane; Attendance: 14,625

23 August 1989 2	Derby County	1–1	Wimbledon	Derby
	Hebberd 84'		Cork 28'	Stadium: Baseball Ground; Attendance: 13,874

26 August 1989 3	Arsenal	0–0	Wimbledon	London
				Stadium: Highbury; Attendance: 32,279

29 August 1989 4	Wimbledon	2–2	Millwall	London
	Fairweather; Cork		Anthrobus; Cascarino	Stadium: Plough Lane; Attendance: 8,865

9 September 1989 5	Crystal Palace	2–0	Wimbledon	London
	Thomas; Wright			Stadium: Selhurst Park; Attendance: 12,116

16 September 1989 6	Wimbledon	1–0	Manchester City	London
	Fashanu			Stadium: Plough Lane; Attendance: 6,851

23 September 1989 7	Luton Town	1–1	Wimbledon	Luton
	Wegerle pen.'		Kruszyński	Stadium: Kenilworth Road; Attendance: 8,449

30 September 1989 8	Southampton	2–2	Wimbledon	Southampton
	Le Tissier		Young; Wise	Stadium: The Dell; Attendance: 12,904

14 October 1989 9	Wimbledon	1–2	Liverpool	London
	Wise		Beardsley; Whelan	Stadium: Plough Lane; Attendance: 13,510

21 October 1989 10	Wimbledon	1–3	Nottingham Forest	London
	Young		Hodge; Parker; Pearce pen'	Stadium: Plough Lane; Attendance: 5,184

28 October 1989 11	Sheffield Wednesday	0–1	Wimbledon	Sheffield
			Gibson	Stadium: Hillsborough; Attendance: 13,728

4 November 1989 12	Wimbledon	0–0	Queens Park Rangers	London
				Stadium: Plough Lane; Attendance: 5,912

11 November 1989 13	Tottenham Hotspur	0–1	Wimbledon	London
			Sanchez	Stadium: White Hart Lane; Attendance: 26,876

18 November 1989 14	Everton	1–1	Wimbledon	Liverpool
	Sheedy		Cotterill	Stadium: Goodison Park; Attendance: 21,561

25 November 1989 15	Wimbledon	0–2	Aston Villa	London
			Platt; Daley	Stadium: Plough Lane; Attendance: 5,888

2 December 1989 16	Chelsea	2–5	Wimbledon	London
	Dixon; Roberts		Gibson; Wise; Cork	Stadium: Stamford Bridge; Attendance: 19,976

9 December 1989 17	Wimbledon	1–1	Derby	London
	Scales		Goddard	Stadium: Plough Lane; Attendance: 5,024

16 December 1989 18	Coventry City	2–1	Wimbledon	Coventry
	Borrows; Curle o.g.'		Young	Stadium: Highfield Road; Attendance: 8,308

26 December 1989 19	Wimbledon	3–1	Charlton Athletic	London
	Curle pen' Kruszyński; Gayle		Bennett	Stadium: Plough Lane; Attendance: 5,988

30 December 1989 20	Wimbledon	2–2	Manchester United	London
	Young; Cork		Hughes; Robins	Stadium: Plough Lane; Attendance: 9,622

1 January 1990 21	Norwich City	0–1	Wimbledon	Norwich
			Gibson	Stadium: Carrow Road; Attendance: 16,680

13 January 1990 22	Wimbledon	1–0	Arsenal	London
	Bennett			Stadium: Plough Lane; Attendance: 13,793

20 January 1990 23	Millwall	0–0	Wimbledon	London
				Stadium: The Den; Attendance: 11,780

10 February 1990 24	Manchester City	1–1	Wimbledon	Manchester
	Hendry		Cork	Stadium: Maine Road; Attendance: 24,126

14 February 1990 25	Wimbledon	1–2	Luton Town	London
	Wise		Nogan; Dowie	Stadium: Plough Lane; Attendance: 3,496

24 February 1990 26	Aston Villa	0–3	Wimbledon	Birmingham
			Fashanu pen' Miller	Stadium: Villa Park; Attendance: 29,325

3 March 1990 27	Wimbledon	3–1	Everton	London
	Fashanu pen' Wise		Sheedy	Stadium: Plough Lane; Attendance: 6.512

17 March 1990 28	Wimbledon	3–3	Southampton	London
	Young; Scales; Fashanu		Le Tissier	Stadium: Plough Lane; Attendance: 5,382

24 March 1990 29	Wimbledon	1–1	Sheffield Wednesday	London
	Fashanu pen'		Shirtliff	Stadium: Plough Lane; Attendance: 5,034

31 March 1990 30	Nottingham Forest	0–1	Wimbledon	Nottingham
			Wise	Stadium: City Ground; Attendance: 16,821

3 April 1990 31	Liverpool	2–1	Wimbledon	Liverpool
	Rush; Gillespie		Gibson	Stadium: Anfield; Attendance: 33,319

14 April 1990 32	Wimbledon	1–1	Norwich City	London
	Fashanu		Bowen	Stadium: Plough Lane; Attendance: 4,638

17 April 1990 33	Charlton Athletic	1–2	Wimbledon	London
	Young o.g.'		Wise; Fashanu pen.'	Stadium: Selhurst Park; Attendance: 5,679

21 April 1990 34	Wimbledon	0–0	Coventry City	London
				Stadium: Plough Lane; Attendance: 4,086

28 April 1990 35	Wimbledon	1–0	Tottenham Hotspur	London
	Fashanu			Stadium: Plough Lane; Attendance: 12,800

30 April 1990 36	Manchester United	0–0	Wimbledon	Manchester
				Stadium: Old Trafford; Attendance: 29,281

2 May 1990 37	Wimbledon	0–1	Crystal Palace	London
			Bright	Stadium: Plough Lane; Attendance: 8,209

5 May 1990 38	Queens Park Rangers	2–3	Wimbledon	London
	Wegerle pen' Channing		Fashanu; Miller; Curle	Stadium: Loftus Road; Attendance: 9,676

=== FA Cup ===
6 January 1990 Third Round	West Bromwich Albion	2–0	Wimbledon	West Bromwich
				Stadium: The Hawthorns

=== League Cup ===
18 September 1989 Second Round First Leg	Port Vale	1–2	Wimbledon	Stoke-on-Trent
				Stadium: Vale Park; Attendance: 5,827

4 October 1989 Second Round Second Leg	Wimbledon	3–0 (5–1 agg.)	Port Vale	London
				Stadium: Plough Lane; Attendance: 2,757

25 October 1989 Third Round	Middlesbrough	1–1	Wimbledon	Middlesbrough
				Stadium: Ayresome Park; Attendance: 12,933

8 November 1989 Third Round Replay	Wimbledon	1–0	Middlesbrough	London
				Stadium: Plough Lane; Attendance: 3,554

22 November 1989 Fourth Round	West Ham United	1–0	Wimbledon	London
				Stadium: Boleyn Ground; Attendance: 24,746

=== Full Members' Cup ===
29 November 1989 Southern Section First Round	Coventry City	1–3 (a.e.t.)	Wimbledon	Coventry
				Stadium: Highfield Road; Attendance: 3,781

5 December 1989 Southern Section Second Round	Portsmouth	0–1	Wimbledon	Portsmouth
				Stadium: Fratton Park; Attendance: 2,499

21 December 1989 Third Round	Ipswich Town	3–1	Wimbledon	Ipswich
				Stadium: Portman Road; Attendance: 7,918

== Squad ==
Note: Flags indicate national team as defined under FIFA eligibility rules; some limited exceptions apply. Players may hold more than one non-FIFA nationality.

Pos.	Nation	Player
GK	NED	Hans Segers
GK	SCO	Neil Sullivan
DF	ENG	Keith Curle
DF	IRL	Terry Phelan
DF	WAL	Eric Young
DF	ENG	Mickey Bennett
DF	ENG	Clive Goodyear
DF	ENG	Roger Joseph
DF	SCO	Brian McAllister
DF	ENG	John Scales
DF	ENG	Dean Blackwell
DF	ENG	Scott Fitzgerald
MF	POL	Zbigniew Kruszyński
MF	ENG	Vaughan Ryan

Pos.	Nation	Player
MF	NIR	Lawrie Sanchez
MF	ENG	Dennis Wise
MF	ENG	Garry Brooke
MF	IRL	Paul McGee
MF	ENG	Paul Miller
MF	ENG	Carlton Fairweather
FW	ENG	Steve Anthrobus
FW	ENG	Alan Cork
FW	ENG	John Fashanu
FW	ENG	Terry Gibson
FW	ENG	Steve Cotterill
FW	ENG	John Gayle
FW	ENG	Aidan Newhouse
