= 1993–94 Liverpool F.C. season =

English football club season

Liverpool F.C.
1993–94 season
- Chairman: David Moores
- Manager: Graeme Souness (until 28 January); Roy Evans (from 31 January)
- Stadium: Anfield
- FA Premier League: 8th
- FA Cup: Third round
- League Cup: Fourth round
- Top goalscorer: League: Ian Rush (14); All: Ian Rush (19)
- Highest home attendance: 44,601 (v Newcastle United, League, 16 Apr)
- Lowest home attendance: 12,541 (v Fulham, League Cup, 5 Oct)
- Average home league attendance: 35,847
Home colours	Away colours

The 1993–94 Liverpool F.C. season was the 102nd season in the club's existence, and their 32nd consecutive year in the top-flight.

Manager Graeme Souness resigned on 29 January 1994 after just under three years in charge following a shock FA Cup exit at the hands of Bristol City, and he was succeeded by long serving coach Roy Evans, who guided the Reds to eighth place in the final table.

The season began with the arrival of two notable new players, striker Nigel Clough and defender Neil Ruddock. A month into the season, Liverpool signed defender Julian Dicks from West Ham United, with defender David Burrows and midfielder Mike Marsh heading to East London as part of the deal. January saw the departure of striker Ronny Rosenthal to Tottenham Hotspur. It was the last season at Anfield for long-serving goalkeeper Bruce Grobbelaar and midfielder Ronnie Whelan, who had both been at the club for well over a decade and signed for Southampton and Southend United respectively. Less high-profile departure during and after the season were midfielder Don Hutchison, defender Torben Piechnik and goalkeeper Mike Hooper.

Teenage striker Robbie Fowler made his debut early in the season and scored all five goals in a League Cup tie against Fulham in one of his first senior games, and by the end of the season had scored 12 goals in the league and 18 in all competitions to oust Nigel Clough as the regular partner of Ian Rush.

The famous Spion Kop was demolished at the end of the season to make way for a new all-seater stand as Premier League clubs had to have all-seater stadiums for the 1994–95 season in line with the Taylor Report.

This season covered the period from 1 July 1993 to 30 June 1994.

== Players ==
=== First-team squad ===
Note: Flags indicate national team as defined under FIFA eligibility rules; some limited exceptions apply. Players may hold more than one non-FIFA nationality.

No.	Pos.	Nation	Player
1	GK	ZIM	Bruce Grobbelaar (Note: Grobbelaar was born in Durban, South Africa, but was raised in Rhodesia (later named Zimbabwe) from the age of two months and made his international debut for Rhodesia in 1977 and for Zimbabwe in 1980.)
2	DF	ENG	Rob Jones
3	DF	ENG	Julian Dicks
4	DF	SCO	Steve Nicol
5	DF	ENG	Mark Wright
6	MF	SCO	Don Hutchison (Note: Hutchison was born in Gateshead, England, but also qualified to represent Scotland internationally through his father and represented them at B level in 1994 before making his international debut for Scotland in March 1999.)
7	FW	ENG	Nigel Clough
8	FW	ENG	Paul Stewart
9	FW	WAL	Ian Rush (captain)
10	MF	ENG	John Barnes (Note: Barnes was born in Kingston, Jamaica but qualified to play for England after having emigrated there at the age of 12, before making his international debut in May 1983.)
11	MF	ENG	Mark Walters
12	MF	IRL	Ronnie Whelan
13	GK	ENG	David James

No.	Pos.	Nation	Player
14	MF	DEN	Jan Mølby
15	MF	ENG	Jamie Redknapp
16	MF	ENG	Michael Thomas
17	MF	ENG	Steve McManaman
18	MF	ENG	Phil Charnock
19	DF	DEN	Torben Piechnik
20	DF	NOR	Stig Inge Bjørnebye
21	MF	ENG	Dominic Matteo (Note: Matteo was born in Dumfries, Scotland, but was raised in England from the age of four and represented them at U-21 and B level before making his international debut for Scotland in November 2000.)
22	DF	ENG	Steve Harkness
23	FW	ENG	Robbie Fowler
25	DF	ENG	Neil Ruddock
27	GK	ENG	Mark Gayle (on loan from Crewe Alexandra)

=== Left club during season ===
Note: Flags indicate national team as defined under FIFA eligibility rules; some limited exceptions apply. Players may hold more than one non-FIFA nationality.

No.	Pos.	Nation	Player
3	DF	ENG	David Burrows
18	FW	ISR	Ronny Rosenthal

No.	Pos.	Nation	Player
21	MF	ENG	Mike Marsh
24	GK	ENG	Mike Hooper

== Transfers ==
=== In ===
#	Pos	Player	From	Fee	Date
7	FW	Nigel Clough	Nottingham Forest	£2,275,000	07-06-1993
25	DF	Neil Ruddock	Tottenham Hotspur	£2,500,000	22-07-1993
3	DF	Julian Dicks	West Ham United	Player exchange	17-09-1993

=== Out ===
#	Pos	Player	To	Fee	Date
–	MF	István Kozma	Újpest	Free	01-06-1993
3	DF	David Burrows	West Ham United	Player exchange	17-09-1993
21	MF	Mike Marsh	West Ham United	Player exchange	17-09-1993
24	GK	Mike Hooper	Newcastle United	£550,000	23-09-1993
18	FW	Ronny Rosenthal	Tottenham Hotspur	£250,000	26-01-1994

=== Loaned in ===
#	Pos	Player	From	Start	End
27	GK	Mark Gayle	Crewe Alexandra	25-02-1994	30-06-1994

== Pre-season and Friendlies ==
=== TNT Inter-City Challenge Cup Tournament ===
28 July 1993	Birmingham City	1–1 (4–3 p)	Liverpool	Birmingham
	Saville 17'	Report	Rush 67'	Stadium: St Andrew's; Attendance: 15,355; Referee: T. Holbrook
	Penalties
	Unknown (penalty scored); Unknown (penalty scored); Unknown (penalty scored); Miller (penalty scored)		Ruddock (penalty scored); Redknapp (penalty scored); Barnes (penalty scored); Clough (penalty missed); Walters (penalty missed)

=== Norway Cup ===
4 August 1993	Rosenborg	0–1	Liverpool	Oslo
	Bragstad (yellow card)	Report	Rush 63'	Stadium: Ullevaal Stadion; Attendance: 16,116; Referee: T. Hollung

=== Testimonials ===
9 August 1993 Ronnie Whelan	Liverpool	1–0	Newcastle United	Liverpool
	Ruddock 21'	Report		Stadium: Anfield; Attendance: 21,757; Referee: B. Murphy

10 October 1993 Steve Nicol	Liverpool	1–2	Great Britain XI	Liverpool
	Johnston 77'	Report	Davis 4'; McInally 87'	Stadium: Anfield; Attendance: 12,243; Referee: Unknown

=== Friendlies ===
23 July 1993	Kevin Keegan All Star XI	0–5	Liverpool	Sheffield
		Report	Rush 2', 4'; Clough 30'; McManaman 78'; Walters 81' (pen.)	Stadium: Don Valley Stadium; Attendance: 5,000; Referee: Unknown
Note: Played in memory of a young Liverpool fan, John Andrew Young who was killed in a road accident.

31 July 1993	Tranmere Rovers	3–4	Liverpool	Birkenhead
	Aldridge 33', 59'; Muir 86'	Report	Barnes 19', 56'; Bjørnebye 40'; Rush 51'	Stadium: Prenton Park; Attendance: 10,101; Referee: P. Roberts

2 August 1993	Raufoss	2–7	Liverpool	Raufoss
	Tikkanen 11', 80'	Report	Walters 22', 73'; John Barnes 36', 51'; Redknapp 60', 70'; Nicol 72'	Stadium: Raufoss Stadionw; Attendance: 3,112; Referee: R. Nedrud

7 August 1993	Burnley	0–4	Liverpool	Burnley
		Report	Rush 8', 60'; McManaman 40'; Walters 81'	Stadium: Turf Moor; Attendance: 13,242; Referee: D Allinson

19 October 1993	League of Ireland XI	1–2	Liverpool	Lansdowne Road
	Morley 13'	Report	Hutchison 80'; James Coll 90' (o.g.)	Stadium: Dublin; Attendance: 28,000; Referee: Unknown

9 May 1994	Shelbourne	0–5	Liverpool	Dublin
		Report	Hutchison 47'; Rush 50', 52'; Barnes 56'; Redknapp 66'	Stadium: Tolka Park; Attendance: 12,000; Referee: Unknown

== Competitions ==
=== FA Premier League ===
==== League table ====
Pos	Team	Pld	W	D	L	GF	GA	GD	Pts	Qualification or relegation
6	Wimbledon	42	18	11	13	56	53	+3	65	
7	Sheffield Wednesday	42	16	16	10	76	54	+22	64	
8	Liverpool	42	17	9	16	59	55	+4	60	
9	Queens Park Rangers	42	16	12	14	62	61	+1	60	
10	Aston Villa	42	15	12	15	46	50	−4	57	Qualification for the UEFA Cup first round (Note: Aston Villa qualified for the UEFA Cup as League Cup winners.)

Source: Premier League
Rules for classification: 1) points; 2) goal difference; 3) number of goals scored.

==== Matches ====
14 August 1993 1	Liverpool	2–0	Sheffield Wednesday	Liverpool
15:00	Clough 39', 47'	Report	Palmer (red card) 13'	Stadium: Anfield; Attendance: 44,004; Referee: Gerald Ashby (Worcester)

18 August 1993 2	Queens Park Rangers	1–3	Liverpool	London
19:45	Wilkins 25'; S. Barker (yellow card) 32'; Ready (yellow card) 43'	Report	Rush 20'; Nicol 39'; Clough 43'; Bjørnebye (yellow card) 52'	Stadium: Loftus Road; Attendance: 19,635; Referee: Paul Durkin (Isle of Portland)

22 August 1993 3	Swindon Town	0–5	Liverpool	Swindon
16:00	Summerbee (yellow card) 18'; Moncur (yellow card) 21'	Report	Ruddock 19'; Jones (yellow card) 24'; McManaman 36', 61'; Whelan 70'; Marsh 81'	Stadium: County Ground; Attendance: 17,017; Referee: Philip Don (Hanworth Park)

25 August 1993 4	Liverpool	1–2	Tottenham Hotspur	Liverpool
19:45	Clough 18'	Report	Sheringham 30' (pen.), 45+1'	Stadium: Anfield; Attendance: 42,456; Referee: Keren Barratt

28 August 1993 5	Liverpool	2–0	Leeds United	Liverpool
15:00	Rush 24'; Mølby 39' (pen.); Burrows (yellow card) 65'	Report	N. Whelan (yellow card) 88'	Stadium: Anfield; Attendance: 44,068; Referee: Robbie Hart (Darlington)

1 September 1993 6	Coventry City	1–0	Liverpool	Coventry
19:45	Babb 21' (yellow card) 89'; Boland (yellow card) 90'	Report	Whelan (yellow card) 40'; Ruddock (yellow card) 52'; Jones (yellow card) 67' (yellow-red card) 70'	Stadium: Highfield Road; Attendance: 16,740; Referee: Keith Burge (Tonypandy)

12 September 1993 7	Liverpool	0–1	Blackburn Rovers	Liverpool
16:00	Jones (yellow card) 78'	Report	Le Saux (yellow card) 17'; Berg (yellow card) 18'; Newell 54'; Warhurst (yellow card) 65'; Ripley (yellow card) 72'	Stadium: Anfield; Attendance: 37,355; Referee: Mike Reed (Birmingham)

18 September 1993 8	Everton	2–0	Liverpool	Liverpool
15:00	Ebbrell (yellow card) 8'; Ward 27'; Cottee 85'	Report	Whelan (yellow card) 26'; Redknapp (yellow card) 43'; Clough (yellow card) 89'	Stadium: Goodison Park; Attendance: 38,157; Referee: David Elleray (Harrow)

25 September 1993 9	Chelsea	1–0	Liverpool	London
15:00	Wise (yellow card) 1'; Shipperley 49'	Report	Redknapp (yellow card) 17'; Stewart (yellow card) 57'; Ruddock (yellow card) 72'	Stadium: Stamford Bridge; Attendance: 31,271; Referee: Keith Hackett (Sheffield)

2 October 1993 10	Liverpool	0–0	Arsenal	Liverpool
15:00	Stewart (yellow card) 38'	Report		Stadium: Anfield; Attendance: 42,750; Referee: Gerald Ashby

16 October 1993 11	Liverpool	2–1	Oldham Athletic	Liverpool
15:00	Hutchison (yellow card) 44'; Fowler 87'; Barlow 90+1' (o.g.)	Report	Beckford 73'; Fleming (yellow card); Halle (yellow card)	Stadium: Anfield; Attendance: 32,661; Referee: Alan Wilkie (Chester-le-Street)

23 October 1993 12	Manchester City	1–1	Liverpool	Manchester
15:00	Flitcroft (yellow card) 5'; Phelan (yellow card) 42'; White 66'	Report	Walters (yellow card) 47'; Rush 89'	Stadium: Maine Road; Attendance: 30,403; Referee: Martin Bodenham (Looe)

30 October 1993 13	Liverpool	4–2	Southampton	Liverpool
15:00	Fowler 14', 29', 85'; Rush 63'	Report	Le Tissier 40', 78'	Stadium: Anfield; Attendance: 32,818; Referee: Dermot Gallagher

6 November 1993 14	Liverpool	2–0	West Ham United	Liverpool
15:00	Clough 67'; Martin 83' (o.g.); Rush (yellow card); Wright (yellow card)	Report		Stadium: Anfield; Attendance: 42,254; Referee: Keren Barratt

21 November 1993 15	Newcastle	3–0	Liverpool	Newcastle upon Tyne
16:00	Cole 5', 16', 30'	Report	Nicol (yellow card) 61'	Stadium: St. James' Park; Attendance: 36,374; Referee: Gerald Ashby

28 November 1993 16	Liverpool	2–1	Aston Villa	Liverpool
16:00	Fowler 45'; Ruddock (yellow card) 58'; Redknapp 62'	Report	Atkinson 53'	Stadium: Anfield; Attendance: 38,484; Referee: Alan Wilkie

4 December 1993 17	Sheffield Wednesday	3–1	Liverpool	Sheffield
15:00	Ruddock 30' (o.g.); Palmer (yellow card) 44'; Wright 58' (o.g.); Bright 80'	Report	Fowler 37'; Mølby (yellow card) 43'	Stadium: Hillsborough; Attendance: 32,177; Referee: Jim Borrett

8 December 1993 18	Liverpool	3–2	Queens Park Rangers	Liverpool
19:45	Barnes 25'; Rush 32'; Ruddock (yellow card) 60'; Mølby 79' (pen.)	Report	Ferdinand 10' (yellow card) 26' (yellow-red card) 82'; Barker 46' (red card) 78'; Impey (yellow card) 65'; Peacock (yellow card) 81'	Stadium: Anfield; Attendance: 24,561; Referee: Vic Callow

11 December 1993 19	Liverpool	2–2	Swindon Town	Liverpool
15:00	Barnes 71'; Wright 86'	Report	Moncur 60'; Scott 74'; Ling (yellow card) 90'	Stadium: Anfield; Attendance: 32,739; Referee: K Morton (Bury St. Edmunds)

18 December 1993 20	Tottenham Hotspur	3–3	Liverpool	London
15:00	Samways 37'; Edinburgh (yellow card) 53'; Hazard 69' (pen.); Caskey 76'	Report	Fowler 48', 54' (pen.); Redknapp 51'; Harkness (yellow card) 69'	Stadium: White Hart Lane; Attendance: 31,394; Referee: Robbie Hart

26 December 1993 21	Sheffield United	0–0	Liverpool	Sheffield
12:00	Hoyland (yellow card)	Report		Stadium: Bramall Lane; Attendance: 22,932; Referee: Alan Wilkie (Crewe)

28 December 1993 22	Liverpool	1–1	Wimbledon	Liverpool
15:00	Scales 27' (o.g.)	Report	Fashanu 40'; McAllister (yellow card)	Stadium: Anfield; Attendance: 32,232; Referee: Keith Cooper (Pontypridd)

1 January 1994 23	Ipswich Town	1–2	Liverpool	Ipswich
15:00	Marshall 75'	Report	Ruddock 57'; Rush 88'	Stadium: Portman Road; Attendance: 22,355; Referee: Allan Gunn (South Chailey)

4 January 1994 24	Liverpool	3–3	Manchester United	Liverpool
19:45	Clough 25', 38' (yellow card); Ruddock 79'	Report	Bruce 9'; Giggs 20'; Irwin 24'; Ince (yellow card); Keane (yellow card)	Stadium: Anfield; Attendance: 42,795; Referee: Philip Don

15 January 1994 25	Oldham Athletic	0–3	Liverpool	Oldham
15:00		Report	Dicks 47'; Fowler 54'; Redknapp 81'	Stadium: Boundary Park; Attendance: 14,573; Referee: John Lloyd (Wrexham)

22 January 1994 26	Liverpool	2–1	Manchester City	Liverpool
15:00	Rush 22', 90+1'	Report	Griffiths 4'; Rocastle (yellow card)	Stadium: Anfield; Attendance: 41,872; Referee: Roger Milford (Bristol)

5 February 1994 27	Norwich City	2–2	Liverpool	Norwich
15:00	Sutton 12', 63'; Gunn (red card) 89'	Report	Culverhouse 53' (o.g.); Barnes 77'	Stadium: Carrow Road; Attendance: 19,746; Referee: Dermot Gallagher

14 February 1994 28	Southampton	4–2	Liverpool	Southampton
20:00	Le Tissier 1', 43' (pen.), 49' (pen.); Maskell 6'	Report	Dicks 68' (pen.); Rush 86'	Stadium: The Dell; Attendance: 18,306; Referee: Peter Foakes (Clacton-on-Sea)

19 February 1994 29	Leeds United	2–0	Liverpool	Leeds
15:00	Wetherall 10'; McAllister 87'	Report		Stadium: Elland Road; Attendance: 40,053; Referee: Graham Poll

26 February 1994 30	Liverpool	1–0	Coventry City	Liverpool
15:00	Rush 3'	Report		Stadium: Anfield; Attendance: 38,457; Referee: David Elleray

5 March 1994 31	Blackburn Rovers	2–0	Liverpool	Blackburn
15:00	Wilcox 17'; Sherwood 65'	Report		Stadium: Ewood Park; Attendance: 20,831; Referee: Gerald Ashby

13 March 1994 32	Liverpool	2–1	Everton	Liverpool
17:00	Rush 22'; Fowler 44'	Report	Watson 20'	Stadium: Anfield; Attendance: 44,281; Referee: Keith Cooper (Pontypridd)

19 March 1994 33	Liverpool	2–1	Chelsea	Liverpool
15:00	Rush 8'; Burley 19' (o.g.)	Referee	Burley 50'	Stadium: Anfield; Attendance: 38,629; Referee: Rodger Gifford (Mid Glamorgan)

26 March 1994 34	Arsenal	1–0	Liverpool	London
15:00	Merson 47'	Report		Stadium: Highbury; Attendance: 35,556; Referee: Robbie Hart

30 March 1994 35	Manchester United	1–0	Liverpool	Manchester
20:00	Ince 37'	Report		Stadium: Old Trafford; Attendance: 44,751; Referee: Keith Hackett

2 April 1994 36	Liverpool	1–2	Sheffield United	Liverpool
15:00	Rush 4'	Report	Flo 46', 72'	Stadium: Anfield; Attendance: 36,642; Referee: Terry Holbrook (West Midlands)

4 April 1994 37	Wimbledon	1–1	Liverpool	London
15:00	Elkins 90+1'	Report	Redknapp 65'	Stadium: Selhurst Park; Attendance: 13,819; Referee: Jim Borrett

9 April 1994 38	Liverpool	1–0	Ipswich Town	Liverpool
11:30	Dicks 75' (pen.)	Report		Stadium: Anfield; Attendance: 30,485; Referee: Dermot Gallagher

16 April 1994 39	Liverpool	0–2	Newcastle United	Liverpool
15:00		Report	Lee 4'; Cole 56'	Stadium: Anfield; Attendance: 44,601; Referee: Philip Don

23 April 1994 40	West Ham United	1–2	Liverpool	London
15:00	Allen 1'	Report	Fowler 13'; Rush 88'	Stadium: Boleyn Ground; Attendance: 26,096; Referee: Stephen Lodge (Barnsley)

30 April 1994 41	Liverpool	0–1	Norwich City	Liverpool
15:00		Report	Goss 35'	Stadium: Anfield; Attendance: 44,339; Referee: Brian Hill (Kettering)

7 May 1994 42	Aston Villa	2–1	Liverpool	Birmingham
15:00	Yorke 65', 81'	Report	Fowler 17'	Stadium: Villa Park; Attendance: 45,347; Referee: Keith Burge

=== FA Cup ===
==== Matches ====
19 January 1994 ^{1} Third round	Bristol City	1–1	Liverpool	Bristol
	Allison 73'	Report	Rush 63'	Stadium: Ashton Gate; Attendance: 21,718

25 January 1994 Third round replay	Liverpool	0–1	Bristol City	Liverpool
		Report	Tinnion 66'	Stadium: Anfield; Attendance: 36,720

^{1} Game re-arranged from 8 January; original tie abandoned due to floodlight failure

=== League Cup ===
==== Matches ====
22 September 1993 Second round first leg	Fulham	1–3	Liverpool	London
19:45	Farrell 62'	Report	Rush 19'; Clough 40'; Fowler 83'	Stadium: Craven Cottage; Attendance: 13,599; Referee: Paul Danson (Leicestershire)

5 October 1993 Second round second leg	Liverpool	5–0	Fulham	Liverpool
19:45	Fowler 13', 40', 47', 55', 70'	Report		Stadium: Anfield; Attendance: 12,541; Referee: Alan Dawson

27 October 1993 Third round	Liverpool	3–2	Ipswich Town	Liverpool
19:45	Rush 1', 16', 64'	Report	Marshall 22'; Mason 77' (pen.)	Stadium: Anfield; Attendance: 19,058; Referee: John Lloyd

1 December 1993 Fourth round	Liverpool	1–1	Wimbledon	Liverpool
19:45	Mølby 15' (pen.)	Report	Earle 84'	Stadium: Anfield; Attendance: 19,290; Referee: Roger Dilkes (Mossley)

14 December 1993 Fourth round replay	Wimbledon	2–2 (a.e.t.) (4–3 p)	Liverpool	London
20:00	Holdsworth 18'; Earle 75'	Report	Ruddock 38'; Segers 90+3' (o.g.); Barnes (penalty missed) 96'	Stadium: Selhurst Park; Attendance: 11,343; Referee: Howard King (Merthyr Tydfil)
	Penalties
	Fashanu (penalty scored); Holdsworth (penalty scored); Jones (penalty missed); McAllister (penalty scored); Ardley (penalty scored)		(penalty scored) Ruddock; (penalty missed) Redknapp; (penalty scored) Barnes; (penalty missed) Walters; (penalty scored) Fowler

== Statistics ==
=== Appearances and goals ===
No.	Pos	Nat	Player	Total		FA Premier League		FA Cup		League Cup	
No.	Pos	Nat	Player	Apps	Goals	Apps	Goals	Apps	Goals	Apps	Goals
	MF	(England) ENG	John Barnes	30	3	24+2	3	2+0	0	2+0	0
	DF	(Norway) NOR	Stig Inge Bjørnebye	10	0	6+3	0	0+1	0	0+0	0
	DF	(England) ENG	David Burrows	4	0	3+1	0	0+0	0	0+0	0
	FW	(England) ENG	Nigel Clough	31	8	25+2	7	2+0	0	2+0	1
	DF	(England) ENG	Julian Dicks	28	3	24+0	3	1+0	0	3+0	0
	FW	(England) ENG	Robbie Fowler	34	18	27+1	12	1+0	0	5+0	6
	GK	(Zimbabwe) ZIM	Bruce Grobbelaar	36	0	29+0	0	2+0	0	5+0	0
	DF	(England) ENG	Steve Harkness	15	0	10+1	0	1+0	0	2+1	0
	MF	(Scotland) SCO	Don Hutchison	15	0	6+5	0	0+1	0	2+1	0
	GK	(England) ENG	David James	14	0	13+1	0	0+0	0	0+0	0
	DF	(England) ENG	Rob Jones	45	0	38+0	0	2+0	0	5+0	0
	MF	(England) ENG	Mike Marsh	2	1	0+2	1	0+0	0	0+0	0
	MF	(England) ENG	Dominic Matteo	13	0	11+0	0	0+0	0	2+0	0
	MF	(England) ENG	Steve McManaman	34	2	29+1	2	2+0	0	1+1	0
	MF	(Denmark) DEN	Jan Mølby	13	3	11+0	2	0+0	0	2+0	1
	MF	(Scotland) SCO	Steve Nicol	35	1	27+4	1	2+0	0	2+0	0
	DF	(Denmark) DEN	Torben Piechnik	1	0	1+0	0	0+0	0	0+0	0
	MF	(England) ENG	Jamie Redknapp	41	4	29+6	4	2+0	0	4+0	0
	FW	(Israel) ISR	Ronny Rosenthal	3	0	0+3	0	0+0	0	0+0	0
	DF	(England) ENG	Neil Ruddock	46	4	39+0	3	2+0	0	5+0	1
	FW	(Wales) WAL	Ian Rush	49	19	41+1	14	2+0	1	5+0	4
	FW	(England) ENG	Paul Stewart	11	0	7+1	0	0+0	0	3+0	0
	MF	(England) ENG	Michael Thomas	7	0	1+6	0	0+0	0	0+0	0
	MF	(England) ENG	Mark Walters	20	0	7+10	0	1+0	0	0+2	0
	MF	(Republic of Ireland) IRL	Ronnie Whelan	23	1	23+0	1	0+0	0	0+0	0
	DF	(England) ENG	Mark Wright	36	1	31+0	1	0+0	0	5+0	0

=== Goalscorers ===
Rank	No.	Pos	Nat	Name	FA Premier League	FA Cup	League Cup	Total
1	9	FW	(Wales)	Ian Rush	14	1	4	19
2	23	FW	(England)	Robbie Fowler	12	0	6	18
3	7	MF	(England)	Nigel Clough	7	0	1	8
4	15	MF	(England)	Jamie Redknapp	4	0	0	4
4	25	DF	(England)	Neil Ruddock	3	0	1	4
6	3	DF	(England)	Julian Dicks	3	0	0	3
6	10	MF	(England)	John Barnes	3	0	0	3
6	14	MF	(Denmark)	Jan Mølby	2	0	1	3
9	17	MF	(England)	Steve McManaman	2	0	0	2
10	4	DF	(Scotland)	Steve Nicol	1	0	0	1
10	5	DF	(England)	Mark Wright	1	0	0	1
10	12	MF	(Republic of Ireland)	Ronnie Whelan	1	0	0	1
10	21	MF	(England)	Mike Marsh	1	0	0	1
Own goal					5	0	1	6
Totals					59	1	14	74

=== Competition top scorers ===
Competition	Result	Top scorer
FA Premier League	8th	Ian Rush, 14
FA Cup	Third Round	Ian Rush, 1
League Cup	Fourth Round	Robbie Fowler, 6
Overall		Ian Rush, 19

== Events of the season ==
=== August ===
After Paul Stewart's first season at Anfield had been plagued by injury and loss of form, manager Graeme Souness paid £2.275 million for Nottingham Forest striker Nigel Clough as strike-partner to Ian Rush in hope of getting Liverpool challenging for the title again. He also boosted the centre of defence with a £2.5 million move for Tottenham Hotspur's Neil Ruddock.

Clough made an excellent start to his Liverpool career, scoring two goals on his debut against Sheffield Wednesday in a 2–0 home win on the opening day of the Premier League season. He was also on the scoresheet (along with Ian Rush and Steve Nicol) four days later when the Reds beat Queens Park Rangers 3–1 at Loftus Road. Liverpool recorded a three-match winning start to the season on 22 August when they crushed newly promoted Swindon Town 5–0 at the County Ground. Steve McManaman was on target twice, with the other goals coming from Neil Ruddock, Ronnie Whelan and Mike Marsh. There was a setback three days later when Liverpool were beaten 2–1 at home by Tottenham, but the month ended on a winning note with a 2–0 home win over Leeds United. The Reds were now second behind Manchester United (the defending champions) in the Premier League, and manager Graeme Souness was hopeful of saving his job by bringing the league title back to Anfield sooner rather than later.

=== September ===
After an excellent August, the Reds fell to earth in September as all four of their Premier League games ended in defeat at the hands of Blackburn Rovers at Anfield, Coventry City at Highfield Road, Everton at Goodison Park and Chelsea at Stamford Bridge. This dragged the Reds from second to 13th place in the Premier League.

The only positive note that month came in the Football League Cup second-round first leg at Craven Cottage, in which the Reds beat Fulham 3–1, with Ian Rush and Nigel Clough getting on the scoresheet along with 18-year-old Robbie Fowler, who scored his first goal for the club.

September saw the arrival at Anfield of West Ham United defender Julian Dicks, who was signed in part exchange for David Burrows and Mike Marsh.

=== October ===
The Reds pulled together after a disastrous September, holding Arsenal to a goalless draw at Anfield before overcoming Oldham Athletic at Anfield to win 2–1; Robbie Fowler scored his first league goal in that match. The next game saw the Reds draw 1–1 with Manchester City at Maine Road, before the month ended on a high note with a 4–2 home win over Southampton; Robbie Fowler scored a hat-trick.

Fowler had been spectacular earlier in the month by scoring all five goals against Fulham in the return leg of the League Cup second round at Anfield. Before the month was out, the Reds eliminated Ipswich Town in the third round at Anfield with Ian Rush scoring a hat-trick.

The Reds were now seventh in the table, but 13 points behind leaders Manchester United, who had built up an 11-point lead over nearest contenders Norwich City and Arsenal.

=== November ===
The Reds saw league action just three times in November, first in a 2–0 home win over West Ham followed by a 3–0 defeat at Newcastle United (inspired by former Liverpool players Barry Venison and Peter Beardsley) before the month ended with a 2–1 home win over Aston Villa, in which rising stars Robbie Fowler and Jamie Redknapp were on the scoresheet.

Liverpool were now ninth in the league and the pressure was building back up on Graeme Souness.

=== December ===
December was a tough month for the Reds, increasing speculation that Graeme Souness was about to leave or be forced out of the manager's seat.

The month began badly with a 3–1 defeat at Sheffield Wednesday, though four days later the Reds regrouped to beat QPR 3–2 at Anfield. They were then held to a disappointing 2–2 draw at Anfield by bottom club Swindon Town. A week late came a pulsating 3–3 draw with Tottenham at White Hart Lane. Boxing Day saw a disappointing goalless draw with Sheffield United at Bramall Lane, and the last game of the year was a 1–1 home draw with Wimbledon.

The League Cup run ended at Selhurst Park when Wimbledon defeated the Reds on penalties after a 2–2 draw in the replay, having held them to a 1–1 draw in the first match at Anfield.

Liverpool ended 1993 in eighth place, 20 points adrift of leaders Manchester United though only six points adrift of third place and European qualification.

=== January ===
1994 began with a 2–1 win for the Reds against Ipswich at Portman Road, and three days later they came from three goals down to draw 3–3 at home to Manchester United in which Nigel Clough (struggling to stay in the first team following the emergence of Robbie Fowler) scored twice. The next league game saw a 3–0 away win of relegation-threatened Oldham at Boundary Park, before two Ian Rush goals disposed of Manchester City 2–1 at Anfield. The FA Cup quest began at Ashton Gate on 19 January, in which the Reds held Bristol City to a 1–1 draw. They were expected to triumph in the replay at Anfield six days later, but the West Country side pulled off a major shock to win 1–0, prompting Souness' resignation three days later. Long-serving coach and former player Roy Evans was appointed as his successor.

Liverpool now stood fifth in the league. With Manchester United at the top of the table, the best Evans could hope for on his arrival at Anfield was to guide Liverpool into one of the two UEFA Cup places.

=== February ===
Roy Evans had a difficult first month as Liverpool manager. His first game was a 2–2 draw at Norwich City (who had recently lost manager Mike Walker to Everton), followed by a 4-2 demolition by Southampton, who were fighting relegation. Then came another defeat, this time at the hands of Leeds, who triumphed 2–0 at Elland Road. The first win for Evans came at the end of the month when an early goal from Ian Rush gave them a 1–0 win over Coventry City at Anfield. Liverpool ended the month still in fifth place, four points shy of third place and UEFA Cup qualification.

=== March ===
March was a mixed month for the Reds, who began it with a 2–0 defeat at Kenny Dalglish's Blackburn Rovers, who were hoping to overhaul Manchester United with late run for the title. Then came a 2–1 home win over Everton in the Merseyside derby, in which Ian Rush and Robbie Fowler scored. A 2–1 home win over Chelsea at Anfield followed, but the month ended on a low note with away defeats to Arsenal and then Manchester United which left the Reds sixth and looking increasingly unlikely to qualify for the UEFA Cup.

=== April ===
April was another mixed month for the Reds, who managed to beat Ipswich and West Ham, but were beaten by Sheffield United, Newcastle and Norwich and held to a draw by Wimbledon. With one game to go, Liverpool had slipped to eighth place and were on course for one of their lowest league finishes since promotion in 1962.

=== May ===
The league campaign ended with a 2–1 defeat by Aston Villa, consigning the Reds to a lowly eighth-place finish. Robbie Fowler scored their only goal, bringing his league tally for his first season in the first team to 12 goals, with 18 in all competitions.

1993-94 was the last season at Anfield for veteran players Bruce Grobbelaar and Ronnie Whelan, who moved on to new clubs as their professional careers approached their end.
