= Paul McGee =

Paul McGee may refer to:

- Paul McGee (footballer, born 1954)
- Paul McGee (footballer, born 1968)

== See also ==
- Paul Magee, Irish murderer
