= Gary Elkins =

Gary Elkins may refer to:

- Gary Elkins (footballer) (born 1966), English footballer
- Gary Elkins (politician) (born 1955), businessman and politician in Texas
