= Dean Blackwell =

English footballer

Personal information
- Full name: Dean Robert Blackwell
- Date of birth: 5 December 1969 (age 56)
- Place of birth: Camden, England
- Height: 6 ft 1 in (1.85 m)
- Position: Defender

Youth career
- ?–1988: Wimbledon

Senior career*
Years	Team	Apps	(Gls)
1988–2002	Wimbledon	205	(1)
1990	→ Plymouth Argyle (loan)	7	(0)
2002–2004	Brighton & Hove Albion	21	(2)
Total		233	(3)

International career
1990–1991	England U21	6	(0)
- * Club domestic league appearances and goals

Dean Robert Blackwell (born 5 December 1969) is an English former footballer who played as a defender. He appeared in the Premier League and the Football League for Wimbledon, and the Football League for Plymouth Argyle and Brighton & Hove Albion.

== Career ==
He spent 14 seasons with Wimbledon, turning professional just after their famous FA Cup triumph in 1988, and bounced back to form in the 1996-97 season after two years out of action due to injuries, being a regular member of the first team as Wimbledon finished eighth in the FA Premier League and were semi-finalists in the FA Cup and Football League Cup. He was still with Wimbledon when they were relegated in 2000, and spent two seasons with them in Division One before leaving in 2002 to sign for Brighton. In his first season with the Seagulls, they were relegated from Division One, but were promoted from Division Two in his second season as playoff winners. Blackwell then retired from playing.

Early in his Wimbledon career, Blackwell was loaned to Plymouth Argyle, and was capped six times at under-21 level for the England team. Blackwell made 233 league appearances, scoring three goals, and represented England at under-21 level.

== Career statistics ==
Source: Dean Blackwell at the English National Football Archive (subscription required)

Appearances and goals by club, season and competition
Club	Season	League			FA Cup		League Cup		Other		Total	
Club	Season	Division	Apps	Goals	Apps	Goals	Apps	Goals	Apps	Goals	Apps	Goals
Wimbledon	1989–90	First Division	3	0	0	0	0	0	0	0	3	0
Wimbledon	1990–91	First Division	35	0	3	0	1	0	1 (Note: Appearance in Full Members' Cup)	0	40	0
Wimbledon	1991–92	First Division	4	1	0	0	1	0	0	0	5	1
Wimbledon	1992–93	Premier League	24	0	4	0	0	0	—		28	0
Wimbledon	1993–94	Premier League	18	0	1	0	1	0	—		20	0
Wimbledon	1994–95	Premier League	0	0	0	0	0	0	—		0	0
Wimbledon	1995–96	Premier League	8	0	3	0	0	0	0	0	11	0
Wimbledon	1996–97	Premier League	27	0	6	0	8	0	—		41	0
Wimbledon	1997–98	Premier League	35	0	4	0	0	0	—		39	0
Wimbledon	1998–99	Premier League	28	0	2	0	4	0	—		34	0
Wimbledon	1999–2000	Premier League	17	0	0	0	4	0	—		21	0
Wimbledon	2000–01	First Division	6	0	1	0	1	0	—		8	0
Wimbledon	2001–02	First Division	0	0	0	0	0	0	—		0	0
Wimbledon	Total		205	1	24	0	20	0	1	0	250	1
Plymouth Argyle (loan)	1989–90	Second Division	7	0	—		—		—		7	0
Brighton & Hove Albion	2002–03	First Division	21	2	1	0	—		—		22	2
Career total			233	3	25	0	20	0	1	0	279	3
