= Warren Barton =

English footballer (born 1969)

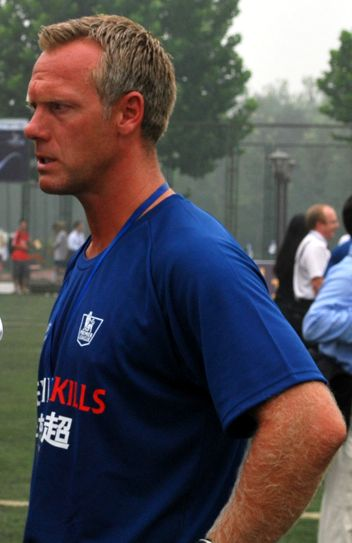
- Barton in 2009

Personal information
- Full name: Warren Dean Barton
- Date of birth: 19 March 1969 (age 57)
- Place of birth: Stoke Newington, England
- Height: 6 ft 0 in (1.83 m)
- Position: Defender

Youth career
- Watford
- Leyton Orient

Senior career*
Years	Team	Apps	(Gls)
- Leytonstone/Ilford
1989–1990	Maidstone United	42	(0)
1990–1995	Wimbledon	180	(10)
1995–2002	Newcastle United	163	(4)
2002–2003	Derby County	53	(0)
2003–2004	Queens Park Rangers	3	(0)
2004	Wimbledon	5	(0)
2004–2005	Dagenham & Redbridge	2	(0)
Total		448	(14)

International career
1991–1994	England B	3	(0)
1995	England	3	(0)

Managerial career
- 2010–2012: San Diego Flash
- * Club domestic league appearances and goals

Warren Dean Barton (born 19 March 1969) is an English football coach, pundit, and former professional player.

As a player, Barton was a defender who notably played in the Premier League for Wimbledon and Newcastle United. He also played in the Football League for Maidstone United, Derby County and Queens Park Rangers, as well as for non-league side Dagenham & Redbridge. He was capped three times by England.

Following retirement, he has worked in consultancy roles with Brighton & Hove Albion and San Diego Flash. He also spent a period coaching the Los Angeles Galaxy under-18 side. Barton continues to reside in the United States and is a television pundit for Fox Sports.

== Club career ==
Born in Stoke Newington, London, Barton began his career in the academy at Watford, before being released. After his release from Watford, Barton joined the youth set-up at Leyton Orient, before again being released after a year. Barton began his senior career playing at Leytonstone/Ilford, before signing for Maidstone United in July 1989 for a fee of £10,000.

Despite some defensive weaknesses, he gained attention from clubs playing in higher tiers of English football due to his ability to move forward at speed up the flank with the ball and place the ball in the box accurately.

During this period, Barton had a 'day job' working in the mailroom at the London offices of accounting firm Arthur Andersen.

=== Wimbledon ===
Barton was transferred to First Division side Wimbledon on 7 June 1990, his £300,000 transfer fee being the largest sum paid for a Fourth Division player at the time. However, Maidstone were sliding into a serious financial crisis at this time and his sale did little to improve matters, although it would be another two years before financial problems finally forced them out of business and cost them their place in the Football League.

Barton walked straight into the Wimbledon first team, missing just one league game in the 1990–91 season as they finished seventh. His first game was in the 3–0 defeat at home to Arsenal on the opening day of the season.

He remained a regular fixture at right-back and later midfield for the rest of his time there, despite playing under three different managers; Ray Harford (July 1990 – October 1991), Peter Withe (October 1991 – January 1992) and finally Joe Kinnear.

During his time at Wimbledon he was instrumental in keeping them in the Premiership, and quickly became one of the most highly rated defenders in England. However, Barton had the most successful spell of his career with the Dons after they moved him into midfield, where his accurate passing set up many goals for the Crazy Gang's forwards.

Wimbledon were widely regarded as the smallest club in the top flight, traditionally having the lowest crowds and the smallest budget to spend on players, but they managed to avoid relegation year after year, more often than not by a comfortable margin, at a time when bigger clubs like Nottingham Forest went down. Barton helped them finish sixth in 1994 – the best finish in their history.

=== Newcastle United ===
On 5 June 1995, Barton became the most expensive defender in English football when he moved to Newcastle United for £4 million, joining "The Entertainers" being assembled by Kevin Keegan. Everything looked rosy for Barton, and a few England caps followed, his classy, comfortable style on the ball earned him a reputation as a true footballing full-back. His attacking role under Keegan however meant he did not always suit the national team and he did not make too many more appearances for England.

He made his debut on 19 August 1995, when the Magpies beat Coventry City 3–0 at St James' Park. He played 31 times that season, and by Christmas it was looking certain that he would be collecting a league title medal as the Magpies had a 10-point lead over Manchester United at the top of the Premier League. However, when the Magpies lost 1–0 at home to the Old Trafford side on 4 March 1996, the lead had been cut to a single point and soon afterwards they were overhauled, having to settle for second place in the final table.

Over the next two seasons, Barton's first team opportunities were more limited as manager Kevin Keegan and his successor Kenny Dalglish (who took over in January 1997) chose Steve Watson as a right back more frequently.

However, Watson's move to Aston Villa in October 1998 saw Barton return to the right-back position on a more regular basis under new manager Ruud Gullit, and he was still the club's first choice player in this position in 2000–01, by which time the Magpies were being managed by the former England boss Bobby Robson.

Barton finally lost his first team place in the 2001–02 season to Aaron Hughes and this time he was unable to win it back. He made just five league appearances before joining Derby County for a fee of £200,000 on 1 February 2002, ending nearly seven years on Tyneside.

=== Derby County ===
Barton was manager John Gregory's first signing for a Derby County side battling against relegation from the Premier League, and played in all of their final 14 league games. At first, things went smoothly enough at Pride Park, with two quick wins following by a point against title chasing Manchester United suggesting that the Rams were on their way to safety. But seven defeats from the final eight games cost them their top flight status after six seasons, and with financial problems putting the club under serious pressure, there was little prospect of a swift return.

Derby finished 18th in the 2002–03 Division One campaign, well short of the playoffs even though they were never in any real danger of a second successive relegation. Barton remained the club's first choice right-back, but following Gregory's dismissal in favour of George Burley, Barton did not feature in the first team in the 2003–04 season, finally departing in October when he joined Division Two promotion chasers Queens Park Rangers on a free transfer.

=== Queens Park Rangers ===
Barton played just five first team games during his four months at Loftus Road, before returning to Wimbledon on a free transfer on 27 February 2004. The Hoops went on to secure promotion to Division One.

=== Return to Wimbledon ===
A lot had changed at Wimbledon Football Club since Barton had last played for them nine years earlier. They had survived in the Premier League for five seasons after his departure, finally going down in 1999–2000. The decision to relocate the club to Milton Keynes was approved in May 2002, after the Dons narrowly missed out on the Division One playoffs for the second season running. In spite of some of the lowest attendances in the league after the majority of the club's fans decided to follow the newly formed AFC Wimbledon (at non-League level), the Dons had managed a respectable 10th-place finish in 2002–03, but then they went into administration and were forced to sell most of their key players. As a result, their fortunes on the pitch suffered and the move to Milton Keynes in September 2003 (initially in the National Hockey Stadium until a new permanent stadium was built) did little to solve matters. By the time Barton arrived at the end of February, the club was still in administration and relegation (if not complete closure) was almost certain. Barton appeared in just five games for the Dons as they went down in bottom place with a massive 33 defeats (one of the worst Football League records ever) and on 17 September 2004 he finally departed from the club, who for the 2004–05 had been re-formed as Milton Keynes Dons to reflect their new location. At the age of 35, Barton's senior career was over.

=== Dagenham & Redbridge ===
On leaving Milton Keynes Dons, Barton dropped into non-League football to play for Conference National club Dagenham & Redbridge in 2004. He was selected just twice for the "Daggers", before finally hanging up his boots.

== International career ==
Barton made his debut for England in the February 1995 friendly away match against the Republic of Ireland which was abandoned after only 27 minutes because of rioting English fans. Known as the Lansdowne Road football riot, the trouble was caused by English neo-Nazi organisation Combat 18. Later that year, he earned his second and third against Sweden and Brazil respectively. In the latter, which proved to be his last international match, he was only a very late substitute coming on for John Scales.

== Coaching and managerial career ==
Barton ended his playing days where he began, with Dagenham & Redbridge in the 2004–05 season and then coached the side during the week. He also worked for Brighton & Hove Albion part-time on a consultancy basis.

In 2008, Barton was named as the under-18 coach for Los Angeles Galaxy of Major League Soccer. He remained in the position until 2010. On 13 January 2010, Barton joined on as a partner and technical adviser for the newly reestablished San Diego Flash soccer club in the National Premier Soccer League. He was later named president and head coach of the club on 19 March 2010.

Barton was named general manager and technical director for Los Angeles Blues of the USL Pro league on 11 December 2012. Regarding coaching certifications, Barton holds the UEFA Pro License as well as the UEFA 'A' and 'B' Coaching Licenses. Barton later began working as a director and youth coach at the Del Mar Carmel Valley Sharks, a youth football club in San Diego.

== Media career ==
Since his retirement in 2005, Barton has worked for Fox Sports 1 as a television pundit while previously working as a Premier League commentator for Sky Sports. In 2006, Barton was part of ITV4's World Cup team of pundits. He presented his own comedy segment entitled 'Warren Barton Travel Agent' in which he provided a comical breakdown of each country taking part in the World Cup.

Barton represented Newcastle United for Sky One's "Premier League All Stars". The match took place on 26 September 2007 and finished 3–3. In the resulting penalty shootout, Barton missed his penalty to knock Newcastle out of the tournament.

Barton is featured in the "Legends of the Tyne" series of beers from Northumberland brewery, which depicts past Newcastle United players.

== Career statistics ==
Appearances and goals by club, season and competition
Club	Season	League			Cup (Note: Includes FA Cup, EFL Cup, and EFL Trophy)		Europe		Total	
Club	Season	Division	Apps	Goals	Apps	Goals	Apps	Goals	Apps	Goals
Maidstone United	1989–90	Fourth Division	42	0	0	0	—		42	0
Wimbledon	1990–91	First Division	37	3	0	0	—		37	3
Wimbledon	1991–92	First Division	42	1	0	0	—		42	1
Wimbledon	1992–93	Premier League	23	2	0	0	—		23	2
Wimbledon	1993–94	Premier League	39	2	6	1	—		45	3
Wimbledon	1994–95	Premier League	39	2	6	0	—		45	2
Wimbledon	Total		180	10	12	1	—		192	11
Newcastle United	1995–96	Premier League	31	0	7	1	—		38	1
Newcastle United	1996–97	Premier League	17	1	3	0	6 (Note: Appearances in the UEFA Cup)	0	26	1
Newcastle United	1997–98	Premier League	23	3	7	0	5 (Note: Appearances in the UEFA Champions League)	0	35	3
Newcastle United	1998–99	Premier League	24	0	6	0	—		30	0
Newcastle United	1999–2000	Premier League	34	0	7	0	5	0	46	0
Newcastle United	2000–01	Premier League	29	0	3	0	0	0	32	0
Newcastle United	2001–02	Premier League	5	0	1	0	6 (Note: Appearances in the UEFA Intertoto Cup)	0	12	0
Newcastle United	Total		163	4	34	1	22	0	219	5
Derby County	2001–02	Premier League	14	0	0	0	—		14	0
Derby County	2002–03	First Division	39	0	3	0	—		42	0
Derby County	Total		53	0	3	0	—		56	0
Queens Park Rangers	2003–04	Second Division	3	0	2	0	—		5	0
Wimbledon	2003–04	First Division	5	0	0	0	—		5	0
Dagenham & Redbridge	2004–05	Conference National	2	0	0	0	—		2	0
Career total			448	14	51	2	22	0	521	16

== Honours ==
Newcastle United

- FA Cup runner-up: 1997–98, 1998–99
- UEFA Intertoto Cup runner-up: 2001
