= Robbie Earle =

Jamaican footballer (born 1965)

Robbie Earle MBE
Personal information
- Full name: Robert Fitzgerald Earle
- Date of birth: 27 January 1965 (age 61)
- Place of birth: Newcastle-under-Lyme, England
- Height: 5 ft 9 in (1.75 m)
- Position: Midfielder

Youth career
- 1981–1982: Stoke City

Senior career*
Years	Team	Apps	(Gls)
1982–1991	Port Vale	294	(77)
1991–2000	Wimbledon	284	(59)
Total		578	(136)

International career
1997–1998	Jamaica	8	(1)
- * Club domestic league appearances and goals

Robert Fitzgerald Earle MBE (born 27 January 1965) is a former football player and current television commentator. Born in England, he represented Jamaica in international football. An attacking midfielder, he played 708 games in senior club football, scoring 166 goals.

Initially a youth player with Stoke City, Earle broke into the professional game with Port Vale in 1982. He spent nine years at the Burslem-based club, helping "The Vale" to promotion out of the Fourth Division in 1982–83 and 1985–86, and out of the Third Division via the play-offs in 1989; he was later voted the club's PFA Fans' Favourite. He moved on to Wimbledon in 1991, where he also spent nine years. He played nearly 300 league games for each club, scoring 77 and 59 goals respectively. He represented Jamaica eight times between 1997 and 1998, scoring one international goal. He appeared in the 1998 World Cup, scoring the nation's first-ever goal in the tournament.

Following his retirement in 2000, Earle established himself in football journalism. He was dismissed from his punditry role with ITV in 2010 after he passed ITV World Cup tickets to a third party. After spending time as television broadcast analyst for the Portland Timbers of Major League Soccer, he is now a commentator for the Premier League on NBC Sports.

== Club career ==
=== Port Vale ===
An attacking midfielder, Earle was a junior player at Stoke City whilst he attended Longton High School. However, after suffering from a broken leg, he was released from the Victoria Ground. He was snapped up by Stoke's local rivals Port Vale, where he turned professional in 1982. He had been scouted by Ray Williams.

Earle made his Port Vale debut under John McGrath in a 1–0 defeat by Swindon Town at the County Ground on 28 August 1982. He scored his first goal in his next appearance, in a 4–1 win over Aldershot at the Recreation Ground. He finished the 1982–83 campaign with one goal in nine appearances, as the "Valiants" won promotion out of the Fourth Division. He made 13 appearances in 1983–84; John Rudge replaced McGrath as manager in December, but could not stop the club from sliding straight back out of the Third Division.

Earle won a regular first-team place in August 1984. He hit 19 goals in 56 games in 1984–85, including a hat-trick against Hereford United at Vale Park on 2 February; Earle and Alistair Brown's partnership got the club a combined total of 40 goals. An ever-present in the 1985–86 Fourth Division promotion squad, he scored 17 goals in 58 games; he and strike partner Andy Jones bagged a total of 35 goals for the club. Earle made 142 consecutive appearances between September 1984 and January 1987, the run coming to an end due to a groin strain. The strain led to a hernia operation in the autumn of 1987, but he returned to first-team action in January 1988. He scored seven goals in 45 games in 1986–87 and scored four goals in 30 games in 1987–88. That season, he played in the FA Cup upset when Vale knocked out Tottenham Hotspur. A regular in the 1988–89 season, Rudge claimed that Earle and Ray Walker was one of the best-ever midfield partnerships at the Vale. He scored both goals past Bristol Rovers in the two-legged 1989 play-off final that took Vale through to the Second Division. After the match Earle wept in the tunnel, such was his emotions to have taken his local team to victory in the play-off final. Throughout the 1988–89 campaign, he scored 19 goals in 57 appearances.

He scored 12 goals in 52 games in 1989–90, including one in a 1–1 draw with Stoke City at the Victoria Ground on 23 September. He remained a vital player in 1990–91, hitting the net 11 times in 37 appearances. As he was affectionately known, 'The Black Pearl' played 357 times for the "Valiants" and scored 90 goals. A cult hero, he is considered one of the best midfielders ever to play for the club. In July 1991 he was transferred to Wimbledon for a fee of £775,000 (and 30% of any future transfer fee above that figure). It was later reported that Wimbledon chairman Sam Hammam had locked Earle in a room during transfer negotiations and only let him out when he agreed to sign for Wimbledon.

=== Wimbledon ===
Earle played an important part in the South London club's success during the nineties, and in particular, the club's 'Crazy Gang' mentality, which fostered team spirit and intimidated opposing players. He played alongside cult figures such as Aidan Newhouse, John Fashanu, Vinnie Jones, Lawrie Sanchez, Jason Euell, Dean Holdsworth, Marcus Gayle, Andy Clarke and Efan Ekoku. Earle was known for his late runs into the box, his ability to finish, and his agility at heading the ball.

His first season at the club was turbulent, as manager Ray Harford was replaced by Peter Withe, who in turn was replaced by Joe Kinnear; nevertheless, Earle scored 14 league goals to help the "Dons" to maintain their top-flight status. He scored seven goals in the newly formed Premier League in the 1992–93 season, including two in a 3–2 win over Liverpool at Anfield, and nine goals in 1993–94 – when Wimbledon finished a club best sixth in the final table.

After injury limited him to nine goalless appearances in 1994–95 (when Wimbledon still finished ninth), he regained his fitness for the following season. He was appointed club captain. His 11 goals in 1995–96 went some way towards securing Wimbledon's survival in 15th place; he scored against Manchester United, Tottenham Hotspur, Chelsea, Arsenal, Manchester City, Blackburn Rovers and Bolton Wanderers. Under his captaincy in 1996–97, the Selhurst Park side reached the semi-finals of both the FA Cup and League Cup, where they were beaten by eventual winners Chelsea and Leicester City respectively. In February 1997, he was handed the Premier League Player of the Month award.

The club survived again in 1997–98, though dropped from fourth in December to 15th by the season's end. He scored seven goals in all competitions in 1998–99 as Wimbledon again reached the semi-finals of the League Cup; however, they finished just two places and six points above the Premier League relegation zone. The "Dons" then struggled under new manager Egil Olsen, and were relegated on the final day of the 1999–2000 season after losing 2–0 to Southampton at The Dell.

During a reserve team game for Wimbledon in 2000, Earle sustained a heavy blow to the stomach and became seriously ill with a ruptured pancreas. At the age of 35 he was forced to give up playing in November 2000. His retirement coincided with the end of the 'Crazy Gang'. In nine years as a Wimbledon player, he made 244 league appearances for the South London club, scoring 59 goals. Towards his end of his time at the club he began coaching the reserve team.

"One afternoon in hospital I was told that I had picked up an infection again. By this time I had lost 4 stone (56 lb; 25 kg). My breathing was irregular, I was in agony. If somebody had told me that death was the best choice, I'd have accepted it – anything to take away the pain."

— The stomach injury that ended his career was intensely painful.

== International career ==
Though English-born, Earle was eligible to play for Jamaica at international level because of his Jamaican parents. He hoped to be called up to the England squad, before he accepted the call-up from Jamaica at the age of 32. Earle was the scorer of Jamaica's first ever World Cup goal, in a 3–1 defeat by Croatia at the Stade Félix-Bollaert, at the 1998 World Cup in France. He played in all three of the Group H games, as Jamaica lost 5–0 to Argentina at Parc des Princes and beat Japan 2–1 at Stade de Gerland.

== Media and later work ==
Since his retirement, Earle has moved into sports journalism. He has worked for Capital Radio, Radio 5 Live, BBC, ESPN, ITV, Sky Sports and OnDigital. Earle was a regular pundit on ITV's football coverage, as well as World Football Daily, and occasionally joins the team on ESPN PressPass. He has also written columns for the London Evening Standard and for the Stoke-on-Trent Evening Sentinel.

In June 2010, he had his £150,000 a year contract with ITV cancelled for giving away World Cup tickets for the Netherlands v Denmark match. Meant for family and friends, he passed them on to a friend who then sold them to Bavaria Brewery. The Brewery company orchestrated an ambush marketing event in breach of FIFA rules. The incident also led to him losing his role as an ambassador for England's 2018 World Cup bid. Earle described his actions as "naive" and insisted that he had "not profited in any way". It later emerged that ITV had given Earle 400 free tickets for the tournament, including 40 for the final itself. This allocation had a RRP of around £70,000. Not permitted to sell the tickets, Earle had freely given them out to friends and family, unaware that a 'close friend' would then sell a significant number on to the Dutch company.

In March 2011, he became a broadcasting analyst at US Major League Soccer side Portland Timbers. In 2004, he was inducted into the Hall of Fame of Show Racism the Red Card.

Earle fronted a consortium bidding to take control of AFC Wimbledon in February 2026.

== Personal life ==
Earle attended Longton High School in Longton, Stoke-on-Trent. UK magazine The Vegetarian Society stated that Earle is a vegetarian.

He got married in the summer of 1989. His son, Otis, is also a footballer and was drafted by FC Dallas at the 2015 MLS SuperDraft.

== Awards ==
Earle was appointed an MBE in 1999 for his services to football. In 2007, he was voted as Port Vale's PFA Fans' Favourites. In 2009, he was inducted into the English Football Hall of Fame as 'Football Foundation Community Champion'. He was inducted into the Stoke-on-Trent Sporting Hall of Fame in May 2018. In May 2019, he was voted into the "Ultimate Port Vale XI" by members of the OneValeFan supporter website. His was one of four faces painted onto a community mural at Vale Park in December 2025, alongside Roy Sproson, John Rudge and Tom Pope. In December 2025, supporters voted him onto the official club website's all-time Port Vale XI.

== Career statistics ==
=== Club ===
Appearances and goals by club, season and competition
Club	Season	League			FA Cup		Other		Total	
Club	Season	Division	Apps	Goals	Apps	Goals	Apps	Goals	Apps	Goals
Port Vale	1982–83	Fourth Division	8	1	0	0	1	0	9	1
Port Vale	1983–84	Third Division	12	0	0	0	2	0	14	0
Port Vale	1984–85	Fourth Division	46	15	3	1	7	3	56	19
Port Vale	1985–86	Fourth Division	46	15	4	1	8	1	58	17
Port Vale	1986–87	Third Division	35	6	2	1	8	0	45	7
Port Vale	1987–88	Third Division	25	4	4	0	1	0	30	4
Port Vale	1988–89	Third Division	44	13	3	1	10	5	57	19
Port Vale	1989–90	Second Division	43	12	3	0	6	0	52	12
Port Vale	1990–91	Second Division	35	11	2	0	0	0	37	11
Port Vale	Total		294	77	21	4	43	9	358	90
Wimbledon	1991–92	First Division	40	14	2	0	3	1	45	15
Wimbledon	1992–93	Premier League	42	7	5	1	4	0	51	8
Wimbledon	1993–94	Premier League	42	9	3	0	6	3	51	12
Wimbledon	1994–95	Premier League	9	0	4	1	0	0	13	1
Wimbledon	1995–96	Premier League	37	11	7	1	2	2	46	14
Wimbledon	1996–97	Premier League	32	7	7	4	6	0	45	11
Wimbledon	1997–98	Premier League	22	3	3	0	1	0	26	3
Wimbledon	1998–99	Premier League	35	5	3	1	5	1	43	7
Wimbledon	1999–00	Premier League	25	3	1	0	4	2	30	5
Wimbledon	Total		284	59	35	8	31	9	350	76
Career total			578	136	56	12	74	18	708	166

=== International ===
Appearances and goals by national team and year
National team	Year	Apps	Goals
Jamaica	1997	4	0
Jamaica	1998	4	1
Total		8	1

Scores and results list Jamaica's goal tally first, score column indicates score after each Earle goal.

List of international goals scored by Robbie Earle
No.	Date	Venue	Opponent	Score	Result	Competition
1	14 June 1998	Stade Félix-Bollaert, Lens, France	Croatia	1–1	1–3	1998 FIFA World Cup

== Honours ==
Port Vale

- Football League Fourth Division third-place promotion: 1982–83
- Football League Fourth Division fourth-place promotion: 1985–86
- Football League Third Division play-offs: 1989

Individual

- Premier League Player of the Month: February 1997
- PFA Fans' Favourites player (Port Vale): 2007
- Port Vale Hall of Fame: inducted 2026 (inaugural)
