= Neal Ardley =

English football manager (born 1972)

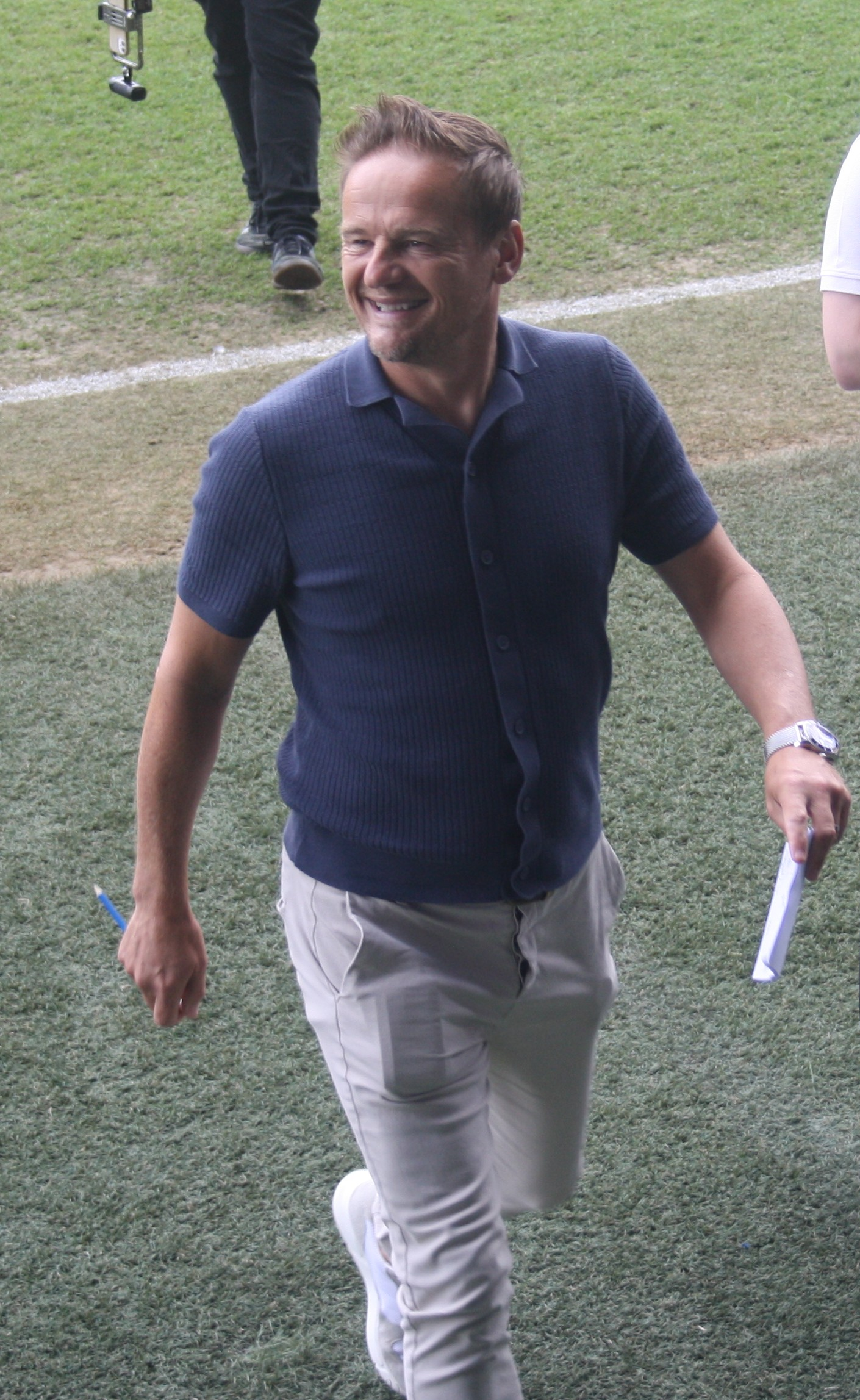
- Ardley in 2025

Personal information
- Full name: Neal Christopher Ardley
- Date of birth: 1 September 1972 (age 54)
- Place of birth: Epsom, Surrey, England
- Height: 5 ft 9 in (1.75 m)
- Position: Right midfielder

Team information
- Current team: Walton & Hersham (director of football)

Youth career
- Wimbledon

Senior career*
Years	Team	Apps	(Gls)
1991–2002	Wimbledon	245	(18)
2002–2005	Watford	111	(7)
2005–2006	Cardiff City	38	(1)
2006–2007	Millwall	21	(0)
Total		415	(26)

International career
1993–1994	England U21	10	(0)

Managerial career
- 2012–2018: AFC Wimbledon
- 2018–2021: Notts County
- 2021–2023: Solihull Moors
- 2023–2024: York City
- 2024–2026: Woking
- * Club domestic league appearances and goals

Neal Christopher Ardley (born 1 September 1972) is an English professional football manager and former player who played as a right midfielder. He is the director of football at National League South club Walton & Hersham.

Ardley was capped at Under-21 level by England. He spent the majority of his playing career with Wimbledon, making his debut for them in April 1991 at the age of 18 in a 2–1 away win over Aston Villa in the First Division. He went on to make over 100 appearances for Watford before having spells at Cardiff City and Millwall.

Ardley announced his retirement from professional football on 30 August 2007 after suffering a series of injuries. On the same day, Ardley announced that he would return to former club Cardiff City having been appointed manager of the Cardiff City Youth Academy. He was the manager of AFC Wimbledon from October 2012 to November 2018. He took over as manager of Notts County in November 2018. He was appointed as manager of Woking in December 2024.

== Early life ==
Neal Christopher Ardley was born on 1 September 1972 in Epsom, Surrey.

== Playing career ==
=== Wimbledon ===
Signed by Wimbledon as a youngster, whilst at Carshalton Boys Sports College, Ardley made his way through the youth set up until breaking into the first team. Ardley made eight league appearances for Wimbledon in the 1991–92 season, featuring more prominently in the 1992–93 campaign, in which he played in 26 games and scored four goals in the inaugural season of the Premier League as the Dons finished 12th. Wimbledon finished 6th in the Premier League in 1993–94, matching the record highest ranking achieved by the club during their first ever season in the top flight during 1986–87. Ardley's contribution was more limited during this season, however, as he was selected to play in just 16 games. He scored just once in a 2–1 win over Sheffield Wednesday on 15 January 1994. He was in and out of the team for nearly a decade afterwards, remaining with the Dons after their relegation at the end of 1999–2000. Two more seasons followed as he unsuccessfully tried to help them regain their Premier League place, before he signed for Division One rivals Watford on a free transfer on 9 August 2002.

By the time Ardley left the club in 2002 he had played a total of 245 league games for Wimbledon, scoring 18 goals. He was their longest serving player by the time of his departure. His best campaign was arguably the 1996–97 season, where he missed just four league games, helped the Dons reach the semi-finals of both the FA Cup and the Football League Cup, and oversaw an excellent season in the league where they were rarely out of the top five until having to settle for 8th place in the final table.

=== Watford ===
Ardley played for the Hornets for three seasons, making appearances an FA Cup semi final in 2003 and a League Cup semi-final in 2005.

=== Cardiff City ===
Ardley joined Cardiff City in March 2005, a day before the dismissal of Watford manager Ray Lewington. He scored his first and only goal for Cardiff against Leicester City on 19 April 2005.

=== Millwall ===
Ardley joined Millwall for the 2006–07 season, his last professional season.

== Managerial career ==
=== Cardiff City academy ===
Ardley announced his retirement from professional football on 30 August 2007 after a series of injuries. The same day he was appointed as manager of the Cardiff City academy. Ardley had started preparing for a manager's role at the early age of 24, when he took his first coaching badges before completing his training for the UEFA Pro coaching qualification in 2010. He impressed in the role by guiding several players through to the first-team squad, including highly rated pair Joe Ralls and Theo Wharton making the step-up. Ardley remained with the club for five years.

=== AFC Wimbledon ===
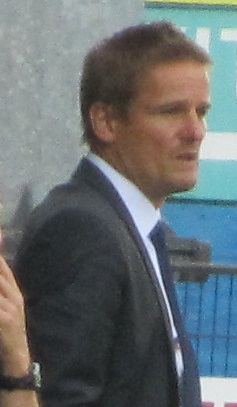
Ardley as manager of AFC Wimbledon in 2013

Ardley was appointed as manager of League Two club AFC Wimbledon on 10 October 2012, with former Watford teammate Neil Cox being named as assistant manager on the same day. The final two man shortlist for the job was Ardley and former Wales international Rob Page.

On 2 December 2012, Ardley managed AFC Wimbledon in their first ever meeting with MK Dons, the football club formed via his former club Wimbledon's relocation to Milton Keynes. An injury-time goal saw AFC Wimbledon lose 2–1.

Ardley made additions to his squad during the January transfer window with Alan Bennett being the most notable. In March 2013, Ardley was nominated for Football League Two Manager of the Month following Wimbledon's unbeaten run. Despite this, Wimbledon were in 23rd place going into the last match of the season with only Aldershot Town below them, however a 2–1 win at home to mid table Fleetwood Town saw Ardley lead Wimbledon to safety instead, sending Barnet down. Remarkably, Wimbledon jumped 3 places and finished in 20th (53 points; -22 GD), despite having the worst goal difference in the league.

For the start of his first full season in charge he added a number of new faces which included the likes of Charlie Sheringham. The 2013–14 season started off very brightly for the Dons beating Wycombe Wanderers, Scunthorpe United, Fleetwood Town and Burton Albion in their first four home matches leaving AFC Wimbledon sat in a Play-Off position in September. Ardley saw his team slip further down the league in the coming months which included a run of one win in eight leading into the New Year, however it still saw the Dons in a remarkably more comfortable position then when Ardley first took charge. Once again, Wimbledon finished comfortably in 20th place (53 points; -8 GD), which could have been 16th place had it not been for fielding an ineligible player.

Ardley strengthened his squad during June and into July with the signing of Matt Tubbs, Adebayo Akinfenwa and James Shea amongst others. As the season began, Ardley put faith in his summer signings with James Shea replacing last season's number one Ross Worner. AFC Wimbledon began the season brightly with a draw at home to Shrewsbury Town which was succeeded by fine wins over Luton Town and Southend United both of which came away from home. The club's first defeat in the league came after his team squandered a 1–0 lead at home to Hartlepool United to lose 2–1.

Ardley also managed AFC Wimbledon to their first ever victory against MK Dons on 7 October 2014. They met for the third time in the Football League Trophy with goals from Ade Azeez, Sean Rigg and Adebayo Akinfenwa securing a 3–2 win for the Dons. It would become the season of cup run after he led the club to the FA Cup third round after beating Wycombe Wanderers. The reward for reaching the Third Round for the first time in the newly formed club's history was a home game against Liverpool, which the Dons lost 2–1. Ardley underwent hip surgery in March 2015, leaving Neil Cox in charge for the 1–1 draw with Tranmere Rovers. Wimbledon finished in 15th place (58 points; -6 GD).

The Dons steady progress over the previous 3 seasons was the base for an extremely successful 2015–16 season. Wimbledon finished in 7th place (75 points; +14 GD), the final Play-off position, thanks to new signing Lyle Taylor's 20 League goals. After Ardley had navigated the Dons through the Play-off Semi Finals against Accrington Stanley, Ardley achieved his first managerial trophy by beating Plymouth Argyle 2–0 in the League Two Play-off Final, promoting AFC Wimbledon to League One for the first time in its history.

The 2016–17 season had the Dons finish respectably in 15th place (57 points; -3 GD) in its first season in League One, in part to Lyle Taylor and Tom Elliott's 10 and 9 League goals respectively.

The 2017–18 season saw Ardley unable to follow up and build on the previous season. The Dons disappointed and battled relegation all season but managed to stay up with an 18th-place finish (53 points; -11 GD), due to Lyle Taylor's 14 League goals and a 7-game unbeaten run over April and May.

Ardley managed an overhaul of the Dons first team throughout the 2018 summer, as a number of players left the club. The most high-profile was Lyle Taylor, who went on to be AFC Wimbledon's record Football League goal scorer with 44 goals, and the Dons' highest scorer during their Football League era with 55 goals in all competitions. The 2018 summer also saw Ardley become the 3rd longest serving manager in English League football. Ardley had more than six years in charge of the Dons.

The 2018–19 season saw the Dons carry on its unbeaten run with an opening day win away (1–0) at Fleetwood Town and followed up with a home draw (0–0) against Coventry City. Ardley oversaw a 10-game unbeaten run thanks to an away win (2–1) against Portsmouth in the First Round of the League Cup. This was the first time the Dons had made it to the Second Round since being back in English League football. Following a run of 10 defeats in 12 Football League games, Ardley left AFC Wimbledon by mutual agreement on 12 November 2018.

=== Notts County ===
Ardley was appointed as manager of Notts County on 23 November 2018, assisted by Neil Cox, with whom he worked with at AFC Wimbledon. On his arrival, Ardley said "that the chance to manage Notts County is one I couldn't let pass." The 2018–19 season ended in disappointment for Notts County and Ardley as it saw the club relegated to the National League on the final day of the season for the first time in their history.

County looked to bounce straight back to the Football League and win an immediate promotion in a season that was interrupted by the COVID-19 pandemic. In June 2020, it was decided that the Play-Offs would go ahead with County finding themselves in third place when the table was determined on a points-per-game basis. County reached the final however were beaten 3–1 by Harrogate Town who were promoted to the Football League for the first time in their history. County also reached the semi-final of the FA Trophy, again falling to defeat to Harrogate Town in a delayed match that took place in September 2020. Ardley was dismissed on 24 March 2021 with the club 14 points behind the league leaders, Sutton United.

=== Solihull Moors ===
On 14 June 2021, Ardley was appointed manager of National League club Solihull Moors. After an impressive October that saw his team get four wins and two draws from six matches, Ardley was awarded the league's Manager of the Month award with his goalkeeper Ryan Boot getting the Player of the Month award, and the club conceding only one goal in these matches. The 2021–22 campaign saw the second-highest finish in the club's history, as they finished third before losing to Grimsby Town in the play-off final. Following a mid-table finish in the 2022–23 season, Ardley left the club "by mutual consent" on 25 June 2023.

=== York City ===
On 6 September 2023, Ardley was announced as manager of York City on a three-year contract. On 26 February 2024, he was dismissed with the club sitting one point above the relegation zone.

=== Woking ===
On 18 December 2024, Ardley was appointed manager of National League club Woking. He lost only one in his first seventeen matches in charge of the club, the only loss coming against his former team York City. Ardley was dismissed on 1 March 2026.

=== Walton & Hersham ===
Ardley was appointed as director of football at National League South club Walton & Hersham on 17 September 2026.

== Career statistics ==
Appearances and goals by club, season and competition
Club	Season	League			FA Cup		League Cup		Other		Total	
Club	Season	Division	Apps	Goals	Apps	Goals	Apps	Goals	Apps	Goals	Apps	Goals
Wimbledon	1990–91	First Division	1	0	0	0	0	0	0	0	1	0
Wimbledon	1991–92	First Division	8	0	0	0	0	0	0	0	8	0
Wimbledon	1992–93	Premier League	26	4	4	0	2	1	—		32	5
Wimbledon	1993–94	Premier League	16	1	2	0	5	1	—		23	2
Wimbledon	1994–95	Premier League	14	1	2	0	3	0	—		19	1
Wimbledon	1995–96	Premier League	6	0	2	0	1	0	0	0	9	0
Wimbledon	1996–97	Premier League	34	2	5	0	5	0	—		44	2
Wimbledon	1997–98	Premier League	34	2	5	1	0	0	—		39	3
Wimbledon	1998–99	Premier League	23	0	3	0	5	3	—		31	3
Wimbledon	1999–2000	Premier League	17	2	1	0	1	0	—		19	2
Wimbledon	2000–01	First Division	37	3	5	2	2	0	—		44	5
Wimbledon	2001–02	First Division	29	3	2	0	1	0	—		32	3
Wimbledon	Total		245	18	31	3	25	5	0	0	301	26
Watford	2002–03	First Division	43	2	5	0	1	0	—		49	2
Watford	2003–04	First Division	38	1	2	0	1	0	—		41	1
Watford	2004–05	Championship	30	4	2	0	6	0	—		38	4
Watford	Total		111	7	9	0	8	0	—		128	7
Cardiff City	2004–05	Championship	8	1	—		—		—		8	1
Cardiff City	2005–06	Championship	30	0	1	0	2	0	—		33	0
Cardiff City	Total		38	1	1	0	2	0	—		41	1
Millwall	2006–07	League One	20	0	1	0	1	0	0	0	22	0
Millwall	2007–08	League One	1	0	—		0	0	—		1	0
Millwall	Total		21	0	1	0	1	0	0	0	23	0
Career total			415	26	42	3	36	5	0	0	493	34

== Managerial statistics ==
As of 1 March 2026

Managerial record by team and tenure
Team	From	To	Record					Ref.
Team	From	To	P	W	D	L	Win %	Ref.
AFC Wimbledon	10 October 2012	12 November 2018	326	106	93	127	32.5	
Notts County	28 November 2018 (Note: Ardley's appointment was announced on 23 November 2018 but did not take effect until 28 November. The intervening matches against Morecambe and Carlisle United were taken by caretaker manager Steve Chettle.)	24 March 2021	106	46	27	33	43.4	
Solihull Moors	14 June 2021	25 June 2023	104	47	28	29	45.2	
York City	6 September 2023	26 February 2024	34	10	14	10	29.4	
Woking	18 December 2024	1 March 2026	70	26	24	20	37.1	
Total			640	235	186	219	36.7	

== Honours ==
AFC Wimbledon

- Football League Two play-offs: 2016

Individual

- Football League Two Manager of the Month: December 2014, April 2016
- National League Manager of the Month: December 2019, January 2021, October 2021
