= Gerald Dobbs =

English footballer

Personal information
- Full name: Gerald Francis Dobbs
- Date of birth: 24 January 1971 (age 55)
- Place of birth: Lambeth, England
- Position: Midfielder

Senior career*
Years	Team	Apps	(Gls)
1991–1996	Wimbledon	33	(1)
1995	→ Cardiff City (loan)	3	(0)
1996–1998	Dover Athletic	55	(6)
1998–2000	Cork City	32	(5)
2000–2004	Cobh Ramblers	?	(?)
- * Club domestic league appearances and goals

Gerald Dobbs (born 24 January 1971) is an English former football midfielder. He started his career with Wimbledon, scoring a solitary goal in 33 league appearances, then in 1995 had a loan spell with Cardiff City and moved to Conference side Dover Athletic. After 2 seasons he moved to Ireland, where he played for Cork City and Cobh Ramblers.
