= Zbigniew Kruszyński =

Polish-German footballer

Personal information
- Full name: Zbigniew Kruszyński
- Date of birth: 14 October 1960 (age 66)
- Place of birth: Tczew, Poland
- Height: 1.82 m (6 ft 0 in)
- Positions: Midfielder; utility player

Youth career
- Unia Tczew

Senior career*
Years	Team	Apps	(Gls)
1976–1979	Lechia Gdańsk	56	(12)
1979–1982	Hamburger SV II		
1982–1983	SC Concordia von 1907		
1983–1987	1. FC Saarbrücken	127	(9)
1987–1988	FC Homburg	33	(2)
1988–1992	Wimbledon	71	(6)
1992	→ Brentford (loan)	8	(0)
1992–1993	Brentford	6	(0)
1993	Coventry City	2	(0)
1993–1994	Peterborough United	3	(0)
1994	Oxford City		
1994–1995	St Albans City	9	(0)
1996	Hayes	2	(0)
1996	Crawley Town	8	(1)
1996	Chertsey Town		
1996–1997	Kingstonian	10	(2)

International career
1977–1978	Poland U18		
Medal record
Men's football
Representing Poland
UEFA European Under-18 Championship
Third place	1978 Poland
- * Club domestic league appearances and goals

Zbigniew Kruszyński (born 14 October 1960), commonly known as Detsi Kruszyński or Detzi Kruszyński, is a Polish-German former professional footballer.

Primarily a midfielder, he was also adept in defence and attack. In an 18-year professional career, he played league football in Poland, Germany and England. He is probably best remembered for his three-year spell in Germany with 1. FC Saarbrücken, for whom he made over 130 appearances. He also made over 70 First Division appearances for Wimbledon in England.

Kruszyński represented Poland at U18 level and was part of the team which finished third at the 1978 European U18 Championship. Kruszyński currently coaches youth football in Ohio, United States.

== Club career ==
=== Lechia Gdańsk ===
Born in Tczew, Kruszyński began his career as a youth at hometown club Unia Tczew, before moving to II Liga club Lechia Gdańsk in 1976. Despite being aged just 16, he made his professional debut in a league match versus Olimpia Poznań on 5 June 1977, coming on as a substitute for Andrzej Głownia after 67 minutes. Kruszyński broke into the team the 1977–78 season, making 23 league appearances and scoring two goals and improving again the following year, scoring ten goals in 34 appearances. Kruszyński travelled with the club to take part in a friendly tournament in West Germany in the summer of 1979 and refused to return to Poland with the team, which caused the Polish FA to suspend him for a year. He made 61 appearances and scored 13 goals for Gdańsk.

=== Hamburger SV II ===
While in West Germany, Kruszyński signed for Hamburger SV II in 1979. In a three-season spell, he failed to make an appearance for the club's first team, but trained with high-profile players Franz Beckenbauer, Kevin Keegan, Manfred Kaltz and Felix Magath.

=== SC Concordia von 1907 ===
Kruszyński joined Oberliga Nord club SC Concordia von 1907 in 1982 and departed at the end of the 1982–83 season.

=== 1. FC Saarbrücken ===
Kruszyński moved back up the German pyramid to sign for 2. Bundesliga club 1. FC Saarbrücken in 1983. He quickly established himself in the team, missing just five league games during the 1983–84 season. Kruszyński made 32 appearances to help Saarbrücken to a third-place finish in the 1984–85 season and though he did not play, the club secured promotion to the Bundesliga after winning a playoff versus Arminia Bielefeld.

Now playing in the Bundesliga, Kruszyński was moved from his forward position back into the defence and made 32 appearances in a poor 1985–86 season which saw Saarbrücken relegated straight back to the 2. Bundesliga. Kruszyński departed the club at the end of the 1986–87 season, after disastrous campaign in which Saarbrücken narrowly avoided relegation to the Oberliga. He made 132 appearances and scored ten goals during three years at the Ludwigsparkstadion.

=== FC Homburg ===
Kruszyński remained within Saarland to sign for Bundesliga club FC Homburg in 1987. He made 34 appearances and scored two goals during a disastrous 1987–88 season, which saw Homburg relegated back to the 2. Bundesliga after just two seasons in the top-flight.

=== Wimbledon ===
Kruszyński moved to England to sign for First Division club Wimbledon in December 1988 for a £100,000 fee and he became the third Pole to play in the English top-flight. Utilised as a midfielder by manager Bobby Gould, he struggled to adapt to the physicality of the English game. Kruszyński dropped out of contention during the 1991–92 season and departed the club in August 1992. Kruszyński made 71 league appearances and scored four goals during three and a half years with the Dons.

=== Brentford ===
Kruszyński joined Third Division club Brentford on loan for the final eight games of the 1991–92 season. He played in each game in midfield and helped the Bees secure the Third Division championship and promotion to the second tier. Kruszyński signed permanently for a £60,000 fee in August 1992, but managed only eight appearances during the whole of the 1992–93 season, as the Bees suffered relegation straight back to the third tier. Kruszyński failed to see eye-to-eye with manager Phil Holder and was transfer-listed in September 1992, before being fined two weeks' wages for a training ground bust-up with coach Graham Pearce later in the year. His contract was cancelled at the end of the 1992–93 season, after making 16 appearances in just over a year at Griffin Park.

=== Coventry City ===
After a deal to move back to Germany fell through, Kruszyński remained in England and signed for Premiership club Coventry City in September 1993. He made just three appearances and departed the club in December 1993.

=== Peterborough United ===
After a proposed move to Second Division club Birmingham City failed to materialise, Kruszyński joined First Division club Peterborough United in December 1993. He managed just five appearances before departing London Road.

=== Non-League football ===
Kruszyński dropped into non-League football in 1994 and played for Oxford City, St Albans City, Hayes, Crawley Town, Chertsey Town and Kingstonian before retiring in 1997.

== International career ==
Kruszyński represented Poland at U18 level and was part of the team which finished third at the 1978 European U18 Championship. Kruszyński's decision to play club football in Germany in 1979 effectively ended his international career, due to citizenship issues.

== Coaching career ==
Since 2001, Kruszyński has coached youth players at his coaching school in Ohio, United States. At one time, the school had links with Spanish club Barcelona.

== Personal life ==
Kruszyński's brothers Bogdan and Andrzej were also footballers.

== Career statistics ==
Appearances and goals by club, season and competition
Club	Season	League			National cup		League cup		Other		Total	
Club	Season	Division	Apps	Goals	Apps	Goals	Apps	Goals	Apps	Goals	Apps	Goals
Lechia Gdańsk	1976–77	II liga	4	1	0	0	—		—		4	1
Lechia Gdańsk	1977–78	II liga	23	2	5	1	—		—		28	3
Lechia Gdańsk	1978–79	II liga	29	9	0	0	—		—		29	9
Lechia Gdańsk	Total		61	13	5	1	—		—		66	14
1. FC Saarbrücken	1983–84	2. Bundesliga	32	2	4	0	—		—		36	2
1. FC Saarbrücken	1984–85	2. Bundesliga	28	1	1	0	—		0	0	29	1
1. FC Saarbrücken	1985–86	Bundesliga	31	0	1	0	—		—		32	0
1. FC Saarbrücken	1986–87	2. Bundesliga	35	6	2	1	—		—		37	7
1. FC Saarbrücken	Total		126	9	8	1	—		—		132	10
FC Homburg	1987–88	Bundesliga	33	2	1	0	—		—		34	2
Wimbledon	1988–89	First Division	16	2	2	0	1	0	0	0	19	2
Wimbledon	1989–90	First Division	27	2	1	0	2	0	0	0	30	2
Wimbledon	1990–91	First Division	27	2	3	0	2	0	0	0	32	2
Wimbledon	1991–92	First Division	1	0	0	0	0	0	0	0	1	0
Wimbledon	Total		71	6	6	0	5	0	0	0	82	6
Brentford (loan)	1991–92	Third Division	8	0	—		—		—		8	0
Brentford	1992–93	First Division	6	0	0	0	1	0	1 (Note: Appearance in Anglo-Italian Cup)	0	8	0
Coventry City	1993–94	Premier League	2	0	—		1	0	—		3	0
Peterborough United	1993–94	First Division	3	0	2	0	—		—		5	0
St Albans City	1994–95	Isthmian League Premier Division	9	0	—		—		6 (Note: Two appearances in London Challenge Cup, one appearance in FA Trophy, one appearance in Isthmian League Cup, one appearance in Herts Senior Cup, one appearance in Herts Charity Cup)	0	15	0
Crawley Town	1995–96	Southern League Premier Division	8	1	—		—		3 (Note: Two appearances in Sussex Senior Cup, one appearance in Southern League Cup)	0	11	1
Kingstonian	1996–97	Isthmian League Premier Division	10	2	0	0	—		0	0	10	2
Career total			337	33	22	2	7	0	10	0	376	35

== Honours ==
1. FC Saarbrücken

- 2. Bundesliga: 1984–85

Brentford

- Football League Third Division: 1991–92

Poland U18

- UEFA European Under-18 Championship third place: 1978
