= Terry Gibson =

English footballer (born 1962)

Personal information
- Full name: Terence Bradley Gibson
- Date of birth: 23 December 1962 (age 63)
- Place of birth: Walthamstow, London, England
- Height: 5 ft 5 in (1.65 m)
- Position: Forward

Youth career
- 1979–1980: Tottenham Hotspur

Senior career*
Years	Team	Apps	(Gls)
1979–1983	Tottenham Hotspur	18	(4)
1981	→ GAIS (loan)	13	(5)
1983–1986	Coventry City	98	(43)
1986–1987	Manchester United	23	(1)
1987–1993	Wimbledon	86	(22)
1992	→ Swindon Town (loan)	9	(1)
1993	Peterborough United	1	(0)
1994–1995	Barnet	32	(5)
Total		280	(81)

International career
1978	England Schoolboys	8	(5)
1979–1980	England Youth	14	(4)
- * Club domestic league appearances and goals

Terence Bradley Gibson (born 23 December 1962) is an English former professional footballer who played as a forward for several clubs, including Tottenham Hotspur, Coventry City, Manchester United and Wimbledon.

== Playing career ==
Born in Walthamstow, Gibson was educated at Highams Park School in Highams Park, London. He started his career at Tottenham Hotspur, making his first team debut at the age of 17 years and 6 days, before moving to Coventry City in 1983. In 1981, he was loaned out to the Swedish team GAIS, who in that time played in the Swedish second division.

At Coventry, his impressive tally of 52 goals in just over 100 appearances (including a hat-trick in Coventry's 4–0 league win over Liverpool at Highfield Road in December 1983) earned him a high-profile transfer to Manchester United in January 1986. His arrival came when Mark Hughes was in the process of agreeing a transfer to FC Barcelona of Spain for the end of the season, and manager Ron Atkinson was looking to buy a new striker. However, with Hughes not leaving until the close season and his strike partner Frank Stapleton staying put, Gibson spent most of his time on the bench and his chances of first team action barely improved even when Hughes left as Atkinson had since signed striker Peter Davenport. United had been top of the league when Gibson had joined them but a disappointing second half of the season saw them drop down to fourth place, and Atkinson was sacked in early November following a poor start to the 1986–87 season. His successor Alex Ferguson did not appear to want to keep Gibson at United, and with the arrival of Brian McClair in the 1987 close season Gibson left Old Trafford after just 18 months.

He later was a part of the Wimbledon team that won the 1988 FA Cup Final against Liverpool. Other clubs include Swindon Town, Peterborough United and Barnet as player coach alongside Ray Clemence, while he also had brief stints as a trialist with Charlton Athletic and as a non-contract player with Tottenham, but did not play in either club's first team during those spells.

== Post-playing career ==
Gibson had spells as youth team coach and caretaker manager at Barnet after retiring from playing in 1995. He was also coach of the Northern Ireland national team, assisting his former Wimbledon teammate Lawrie Sanchez to victories over England, Spain and Sweden among others. Prior to this he was assistant manager at Wycombe Wanderers, also working alongside Sanchez where together they guided the third-tier team to the FA Cup semi-finals in 2001 where they were narrowly defeated 2–1 by Liverpool. He was also appointed as coach of Premier League club Fulham in April 2007 assisting in the survival of the club in the Premier League. Gibson left the club after the departure of Sanchez in December 2007.

He works as a co-commentator on Sky Sports' coverage of Spanish football. Gibson gained extensive experience of Spanish football while working as a scout for Premier League clubs Bolton Wanderers and Manchester City. He combined this role with coaching Northern Ireland and was based in Southern Spain.

== Personal life ==
Gibson is married to Paula and they have two children. He is a Tottenham Hotspur fan, having played for them in the early part of his career.

== Honours ==
Wimbledon

- FA Cup: 1987–88
