= Brian McAllister =

Scottish footballer

Personal information
- Full name: Brian McAllister
- Date of birth: 30 November 1970 (age 55)
- Place of birth: Glasgow, Scotland
- Positions: Left-back; centre-back

Senior career*
Years	Team	Apps	(Gls)
1989	Napier City Rovers	26	(7)
1989–2000	Wimbledon	85	(0)
1990–1991	→ Plymouth Argyle (loan)	8	(0)
1996	→ Crewe Alexandra (loan)	13	(1)
Total		103	(9)

International career
1997	Scotland	3	(0)
- * Club domestic league appearances and goals

Brian McAllister (born 30 November 1970) is a Scottish former professional footballer who played at left-back and centre-back. His 104 Wimbledon first team games included 85 in England's top division. He also played in the Football League for Plymouth Argyle and Crewe Alexandra and in New Zealand with Napier City Rovers. He was capped three times by Scotland national team, all at the end of his 1996–97 peak season. However, due to injury he played his last game of senior football when aged 27 in September 1998.

== Club career ==
McAllister helped Napier City Rovers win the New Zealand National Soccer League title in 1989.

McAllister joined Wimbledon as a trainee in 1989. Bobby Gould gave him his 1st team debut, aged 19, on 13 January 1990, in a 1–0 home win v reigning league champions, Arsenal.

He played eight loan games for Plymouth Argyle in the latter half of season 1990–91. He played 15 games on loan at Crewe Alexandra in the last three months of season 1995–96.

He then had his most productive spell the season after, playing 29 first team Wimbledon games. This included in league wins against Tottenham Hotspur, Everton, Arsenal and Liverpool among others en route to Wimbledon finishing eighth. He played in 1996–97 FA Cup wins against Manchester United, Queen's Park Rangers and in the quarter-final against Sheffield Wednesday. However he didn't play in the semi-final defeat to eventual winners that season, Chelsea. He played 104 Wimbledon 1st team games during which they were a constant in England's top division.

He was out of the 1st team for six months from October to April in 1997–98. The 1998–99 League Cup defeat to Portsmouth on 15 September 1998 was his last game of professional first team football. He was 27 at the time. He subsequently retired as a professional footballer due to his heel injury.

McAllister scored with a left foot drive into Bruce Grobelaar's top-left corner in a League Cup 4–3 penalty shoot out win v Liverpool. Justin Fashanu, Dean Holdsworth and Neal Ardley were the other Wimbledon scorers in the shoot-out. Vinnie Jones missed with his spot kick for the Dons. The game had ended 2–2 after extra time.

== International career ==
Aged 26, McAllister debuted for Scotland in a 1–0 home friendly defeat v Wales on 27 May 1997. Wimbledon team-mate Neil Sullivan was a fellow debutant in the starting line-up, as were Christian Dailly then of Derby County and Davie Weir then of Hearts. Four days later McAllister and Weir were both given half a game each, with Weir replacing McAllister at half-time. This was in 3–2 friendly away win v Malta. McAllister's 3rd and final cap was 12 days after his international debut. He was a 78th minute substitute for left-back Tosh McKinlay in the 1–0 1998 FIFA World Cup qualifier win away to Belarus. Gary McAllister scored the Scotland goal with a 49th minute penalty.

== Life after football ==
In July 2012 McAllister was reported living in Brisbane running a bakery business. He and his New Zealander wife moved to Australia six months after he retired from football.
