= Paul Miller (footballer, born 1968) =

English footballer

Personal information
- Date of birth: 31 January 1968 (age 58)
- Place of birth: Woking, England
- Position: Midfielder

Senior career*
Years	Team	Apps	(Gls)
1986–1987	Yeovil Town		
1987	→ Bristol Rovers (loan)		
1987–1994	Wimbledon	80	(10)
1987	→ Newport County	6	(2)
1990	→ Bristol City (loan)	3	(0)
1994–1997	Bristol Rovers	105	(22)
1997–2001	Lincoln City	114	(11)
2001–2005	Lincoln United		
- * Club domestic league appearances and goals as of 20:59, 2 May 2009 (UTC)

Paul Miller (born 31 January 1968) is an English former professional footballer who played as a midfielder.

He notably played in the Premier League for Wimbledon during the 1993–94 season, as well as playing in the Football League for Bristol Rovers, Bristol City and Lincoln City. He also played at Non-League level for Yeovil Town and Lincoln United

== Career ==
Miller was an active professional in the game from 1986 until 2001 in this time he appeared for Yeovil Town, Bristol Rovers, Wimbledon, Newport County, Bristol City and Lincoln City. After being released from Lincoln at the end of the 2000–2001 season, he moved to the club's non league local rivals Lincoln United, where he played at a semi professional level until retiring in 2005 after a short spell at Hucknall Town. As a player, he helped Wimbledon to the 1988 FA Cup Final where they achieved a shock 1–0 win over Liverpool. However, Miller was not in the squad for that game. He played a total of 80 top flight games for Wimbledon.

== Personal life ==
In 2011 Miller began working for Serco, a Lincoln-based Air Conditioning and Refrigeration Contractor and is currently their Service Director.
