= Paul McGee (footballer, born 1968) =

Irish footballer

Personal information
- Date of birth: 17 May 1968 (age 58)
- Place of birth: Dublin, Ireland
- Position: Winger

Youth career
- –1986: Tolka Rovers

Senior career*
Years	Team	Apps	(Gls)
1986–1987	EMFA	15	(4)
1987–1989	Bohemians	48	(9)
1989	Colchester United	3	(0)
1989–1995	Wimbledon	60	(9)
1994	→ Peterborough United (loan)	6	(0)
1995–1996	Linfield	17	(1)
1995–1996	Bohemians	7	(0)
1996–1997	St Patrick's Athletic	13	(3)
1997–1999	Athlone Town	?	(?)
Total		172+	(26+)

International career
1989	Republic of Ireland U21	4	(1)
1989	Republic of Ireland U23	1	(0)
- * Club domestic league appearances and goals

Paul McGee (born 17 May 1968) is an Irish former professional footballer who played as a midfielder.

== Career ==
Paul McGee was born in Dublin on 17 May 1968. He first began playing association football when he was six and a half years old. McGee played with Leinster Senior League club Tolka Rovers before he started his League of Ireland career with Emfa A.F.C. in the 1986–87 season. He made his senior debut in a 2–2 draw with Cobh Ramblers at Buckley Park on 7 December 1986. McGee netted his first goal for the club two weeks later, scoring a brace in a 2–2 draw with Longford Town. He again scored twice as Emfa clinched the 1987 League of Ireland First Division Shield by virtue of a 4–2 win over Finn Harps at Oriel Park. It was the club's first trophy in senior football. He finished his debut season with four goals in the league, having added five more in the Shield.

McGee's exploits earned him a move to Bohemian F.C. where he was awarded the PFAI Young Player of the Year for the 1987–88 season. He moved to England for £35,000 in February 1989, after Jock Wallace signed him for Colchester United, then in the Fourth Division. After just three games for the Essex side, he was signed in March 1989 for £150,000 by Bobby Gould, manager of First Division side Wimbledon, who were also the FA Cup holders at the time.

McGee made his debut for Wimbledon against Arsenal on 17 May 1989, his 21st birthday, and scored the second equaliser at Highbury in a 2–2 draw. Over the next six years, he played only 60 league games for the Dons as injuries limited his appearances. His best season at the club was the 1990–91 season, when he was Wimbledon's second highest scorer in the league with six goals. Coventry City bid £3 million for his services but an injury in training derailed the move and he also missed out on an international call up for the Republic of Ireland. Three years later, he was rarely selected for the first team and, after a loan spell at Peterborough United, he left in 1995 to sign for Linfield in Northern Ireland.

After leaving Linfield, he returned to Bohs with spells at St. Patrick's Athletic and Athlone Town before retiring.

Despite retiring from professional football, McGee played for the Republic of Ireland PFAI Over-40s team, and scored a goal in the International Social Soccer Veteran's Tournament in Dublin in May 2014, at the age of 46.
