= Terry Phelan =

Republic of Ireland international footballer

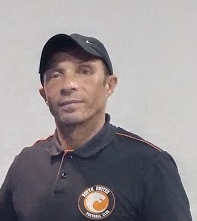
- Phelan with South United in 2024

Personal information
- Full name: Terrence Phelan
- Date of birth: 16 March 1967 (age 59)
- Place of birth: Manchester, England
- Height: 5 ft 6 in (1.68 m)
- Position: Defender

Team information
- Current team: South United (technical director)

Youth career
- 1984–1985: Leeds United

Senior career*
Years	Team	Apps	(Gls)
1985–1986	Leeds United	14	(0)
1986–1987	Swansea City	45	(0)
1987–1992	Wimbledon	159	(1)
1992–1995	Manchester City	104	(2)
1995–1997	Chelsea	15	(0)
1997–2000	Everton	25	(0)
1999	→ Crystal Palace (loan)	14	(0)
2000–2001	Fulham	18	(2)
2001	Sheffield United	8	(0)
2001–2005	Charleston Battery	39	(0)
2005–2009	Otago United	6	(0)
Total		447	(5)

International career
1987	Republic of Ireland U21	1	(0)
1990	Republic of Ireland U23	1	(0)
1990	Republic of Ireland B	1	(0)
1991–2000	Republic of Ireland	42	(1)

Managerial career
- 2015–2016: Kerala Blasters Youth (Technical director)
- 2015: Kerala Blasters (Interim)
- 2019–: South United (technical director)
- * Club domestic league appearances and goals

Terrence Phelan (born 16 March 1967) is a football coach and former professional footballer. He is the technical director of South United FC. He also works as a pundit for Sony Sports Network and Sports18.

He played as a left-back from 1984 to 2009. He played in the Premier League for Manchester City, Chelsea and Everton, as well as in the Football League for Leeds United, Swansea City, Wimbledon, Crystal Palace, Fulham, Sheffield United. He finished his career abroad for Charleston Battery and Otago United. He also made 42 appearances for the Irish national team, whom he represented at the 1994 FIFA World Cup.

During 2015, he was the head coach of Kerala Blasters of the Indian Super League, and has remained in Indian football ever since.

== Club career ==
Phelan started his career as part of the Leeds United youth system, and made 19 appearances for Leeds in the 1985–86 season, but was released on a free transfer by Leeds manager Billy Bremner. Phelan then spent a year at Swansea City, earning a move to top division Wimbledon a year later.

In his first season at Wimbledon, Phelan was a member of the team which won the FA Cup with a shock win over Liverpool in the final. He also helped Wimbledon finish seventh in the league on two occasions during his time there.

After five years at Wimbledon in which he made 198 appearances, Phelan was transferred to Manchester City for £2.5 million at the start of the 1992–93 season, equalling the British record transfer fee for a defender as well as equalling the club's record fee. At City, Phelan made 122 appearances over three and a half seasons. Arguably the best goal of Phelan's career came at Maine Road for City in an FA Cup tie against Tottenham Hotspur when the full-back ran the length of the pitch skipping several challenges and keeping his cool to slot home.

Phelan moved to Chelsea in November 1995, where he spent two years on the fringes of the first team (playing just 15 times in the league) before moving to Everton, where he played regularly under Joe Royle, until he suffered an injury from which he took nearly 18 months to recover.

During Phelan's injury, Walter Smith took over as Everton manager (after Howard Kendall's third spell as manager lasted just one season), and Phelan only played twice under Smith at the start of the 1999–2000 season. He was subsequently loaned to Crystal Palace. Phelan moved to Fulham in February 2000, and was part of the Fulham team which won promotion to the Premier League in 2001. However, Phelan was released by Fulham following promotion, having just made two league appearances that campaign. Phelan then had a short spell with Sheffield United before moving to the United States, where he played for Charleston Battery and also coached young players. In October 2005, Phelan was named as player-coach of Otago United in the New Zealand Football Championship. He remained as coach for four seasons up until the end of the 2008–09 season when, owing to poor results, he was replaced by his assistant Malcolm Fleming for the 2009–10 season.

== International career ==
He made 42 appearances for the Irish national team, whom he represented at the 1994 FIFA World Cup.

== Coaching career ==
Phelan is one of the coaches at the new Templegate Training Academy in Ardwick, Manchester.

On 6 April 2015, Phelan was appointed as a Technical Director of Kerala Blasters' grassroots programme. On 1 November 2015, he was made the head coach of the Blasters after Peter Taylor was sacked. He returned to his previous role when Steve Coppell was appointed as head coach. He then went on to become technical director of Bangalore Super Division club South United in August 2019.

== Honours ==
Wimbledon

- FA Cup: 1987–88

Fulham

- Football League First Division: 2000–01

Charleston Battery

- USL A-League: 2003
- Southern Derby: 2003, 2005

Awards

- PFA Team of the Year: 1986–87 Fourth Division
- FAI Young International Player of the Year: 1992

== See also ==
- List of Republic of Ireland international footballers born outside the Republic of Ireland
