= Gary Elkins (footballer) =

English footballer

Personal information
- Full name: Gary Elkins
- Date of birth: 4 May 1966 (age 60)
- Place of birth: Wallingford, England
- Height: 5 ft 8 in (1.73 m)
- Position: Defender

Senior career*
Years	Team	Apps	(Gls)
1984–1990	Fulham	104	(2)
1989–1990	→ Exeter City (loan)	5	(0)
1990–1996	Wimbledon	110	(3)
1996–1997	Swindon Town	23	(1)
1998–2002	AFC Wallingford		
Total		242	(6)

International career
1983–1984	England Youth	11	(0)

Managerial career
- 2012–2013: Didcot Town
- * Club domestic league appearances and goals

Gary Elkins (born 4 May 1966) is an English football manager and former professional footballer.

As a player, he was a defender who notably played in the Premier League for Wimbledon. He also played in the Football League for Fulham, Exeter City and Swindon Town.

He later spent time as reserve team manager of Didcot Town before being promoted to first team coach. During the 2012–13 season he served as Didcot's first team manager.

== Playing career ==
Steve Perryman revealed that he resigned as manager of Brentford in 1991 because his chairman refused to let him sign Elkins for a nominal fee. The reason given by the chairman was that the player had 'shifty eyes'.

Elkins spent six years playing top flight football for Wimbledon, being a regular at left back for most of that time and playing exactly 100 times in the Premier League.

In 1996, Elkins was signed by Steve McMahon at Swindon Town. He started only 19 games for the club and soon moved into non-league football, while also working as a coach at the Elms Soccer School in Middlesex.

He joined AFC Wallingford in 1998.

== Managerial career ==
In 2006, Gary joined Didcot Town as reserve team manager but was then promoted the season after to first team coach. At the start of the 2012–13 season Elkins became manager of the club. He resigned at the end of the season due to work commitments.

== Personal life ==
Elkins now works as PE Instructor at HMP Huntercombe, and is also a first aid teacher.
