= Lawrie Sanchez =

Footballer and manager (born 1959)

Personal information
- Date of birth: 22 October 1959 (age 67)
- Place of birth: Lambeth, England
- Position: Midfielder

Youth career
- 1974–1976: Southampton
- 1976–1977: Thatcham Town

Senior career*
Years	Team	Apps	(Gls)
1977–1984	Reading	262	(28)
1984–1994	Wimbledon	270	(33)
1994	Swindon Town	8	(0)
1994–1995	Sligo Rovers	18	(1)
Total		558	(62)

International career
1977	England Schoolboys	1	(0)
1986–1989	Northern Ireland	3	(0)

Managerial career
- 1994–1995: Sligo Rovers
- 1999–2003: Wycombe Wanderers
- 2004–2007: Northern Ireland
- 2007: Fulham
- 2011–2012: Barnet
- 2013–2014: Apollon Smyrnis
- * Club domestic league appearances and goals

Lawrence Philip Sanchez (born 22 October 1959) is a former football manager and player. Born in England, he played for Northern Ireland at international level.

The defining moment of his playing career came in the 1988 FA Cup final, when he scored the winning goal for Wimbledon against Liverpool, producing one of the biggest upsets in the competition's long history.

As a manager, he took third-tier Wycombe Wanderers to the semi-finals of the 2000–01 FA Cup, losing 2–1 to Liverpool. After he was sacked by Wycombe Wanderers, he drove Northern Ireland from a FIFA ranking of 124th to 27th, a period during which he notched up notable results against England, Spain, Denmark, Sweden and Portugal.

== Personal life ==
Sanchez was born in London, the son of an Ecuadorian father and a Northern Irish mother. He was educated at Presentation College, an independent school in Reading, Berkshire, and went on to take a BSc degree in management science at Loughborough University while a Reading F.C. player. He was married to Heather, who died of cancer in 1998; the couple had a son, Jack. In 2004, Sanchez became patron of a Northern Ireland-based cancer charity.

== Playing career ==
=== Club career ===
Sanchez began his playing career as a midfielder at Reading in 1977 and remained there until 1984 before being bought by Wimbledon for £30,000, where he became a regular in a successful side. He scored the goal to secure the victory which got the Dons promoted to the First Division against Huddersfield Town in May 1986.

His most famous moment as a player came in 1988, when he scored with a header the goal that won Wimbledon the FA Cup in 1988 against Liverpool. It was not an easy game, as Peter Beardsley had found the net two minutes before Sanchez scored, only to have his goal disallowed. Liverpool came close to jeopardising Wimbledon's dream again in the second half when they were awarded a penalty, only for John Aldridge's shot to be saved by Dons goalkeeper Dave Beasant.

During the 1993–94 season Sanchez left Wimbledon for newly promoted Swindon Town, who ended the season relegated with a mere five wins from 42 games and conceding 100 goals. He played just eight league games for the Wiltshire club and left them after only a few months to be player/manager at Sligo Rovers in Ireland. He scored his last goal in professional football against then Champions Shamrock Rovers on the 3rd of December 1994.

Sanchez is believed to be the first player to be sent off for a professional foul, after committing a deliberate handball in a Football League Trophy match against Oxford United in 1982.

=== International career ===
In 1977, he represented England Schoolboys in a match against Scotland.

Sanchez won three full international caps for Northern Ireland, qualifying by virtue of his Northern Irish mother. Prior to having played for Northern Ireland, he was also qualified to play for Ecuador due to having an Ecuadorian father, but declined the opportunity on the grounds of distance.

== Managerial and coaching career ==
=== Sligo Rovers ===
He became player-manager of League of Ireland club Sligo Rovers in 1994, and in his first season led them to the semi-final of the 1995 FAI Cup. He also managed them in the Cup Winners' Cup against Club Brugge.

=== Wimbledon ===
In 1995, he returned to Wimbledon and became the reserve team manager, winning the Football Combination in his first season in charge. After two years in charge of the reserves, he stepped up to be first team coach under Joe Kinnear.

=== Wycombe Wanderers ===
He became manager at Wycombe Wanderers in February 1999, and with only 18 games left he rescued the team from imminent relegation. In 2001, he guided the club (then in the Second Division) to its greatest moment, reaching the FA Cup semi-finals, where they played Liverpool; Wycombe lost 2–1, having held Liverpool to 0–0 for most of the match. During this campaign, Sanchez famously signed Roy Essandoh after the striker answered a plea from the club for an available striker due to a number of club players being unavailable. Roy's famous winner for Wycombe Wanderers against Leicester City at Filbert Street has since become a goal of FA Cup folklore.

After finishing 12th in 2002 and 11th in 2003, the upward progress came to an end with the collapse of the OnDigital TV deal and the subsequent loss of both revenue and players. After a poor start to the 2003–04 season, Sanchez was sacked by the club on 30 September 2003.

=== Northern Ireland national team ===
Sanchez was appointed manager of Northern Ireland in January 2004. At that point the side was ranked 124th in the world, had a 1,298-minute-long goal drought, and had not won a game for nearly three years. Northern Ireland improved markedly under Sanchez. By the time he left, Northern Ireland were top of their Euro 2008 qualification group and reached an all-time high position of 27th in the world.

Notable results during his tenure included a 1–0 victory against England in a World Cup qualifying match, a 1–1 draw against Portugal, who went on to reach the 2006 World Cup semi-finals, a 2–1 win over Sweden, and a 3–2 win against eventual Euro 2008 winners Spain in a Euro 2008 qualifying match, with striker David Healy scoring a hat-trick. A book about his achievements with Northern Ireland was published in November 2007.

=== Fulham ===
While still manager of Northern Ireland, Sanchez was named as caretaker manager of Fulham following the sacking of Chris Coleman in April 2007. Having achieved his 32-day task of maintaining Fulham's Premier League position, with a record of one win, one draw and three defeats, he was given the manager's job on a longer contract, having first to resign from his position with Northern Ireland.

Sanchez signed four Northern Ireland players, David Healy from Leeds United, Steven Davis and Aaron Hughes, both from Aston Villa, and Chris Baird from Southampton.

He was sacked in December 2007, after a home defeat to Newcastle. This defeat pushed Fulham into the relegation places. Fulham ultimately survived after a 'Great Escape' under Roy Hodgson. Sanchez' tenure was seen as one where good players were signed, but did not yield results. Many of the players who were signed by Sanchez, such as Baird and Hughes, started for Fulham in a Europa League final against Atletico Madrid a couple of years later.

=== Barnet ===
With four matches of the 2010–11 season remaining, Sanchez joined Barnet as football consultant, to assist caretaker-manager Giuliano Grazioli, in their ultimately successful battle against relegation from the Football League. On 13 May 2011, Barnet appointed Sanchez as manager of the club, with Grazioli as his assistant. In the 2011–12 season, the club struggled to stay in the League despite reaching the Area Final of the Johnstone Paint Trophy before losing to Swindon Town. Sanchez was sacked by Barnet on 16 April 2012 with 3 games of the season to go and was replaced by Martin Allen.

=== Apollon Smyrnis ===
"You cannot allow this to happen on live tv."

— Lawrie Sanchez questioning the integrity of Super League Greece on live television in March 2014 after an Apollon goal was disallowed during the club's 3–2 win away at Panthrakikos.

On 17 November 2013, Sanchez was appointed head coach of Super League Greece side Apollon Smyrnis. He met the players for the first time on 18 November 2013 whilst also giving the club's official website his first interview as Apollon Smyrnis head coach. During his time at Apollon, Sanchez has raised his doubts over the integrity of the Super League Greece. On 30 March, he voiced his discontent on live television during the club's 3–2 win away to Panthrakikos.

On 13 April 2014, Sanchez and Apollon were relegated from the Super League into the Greek Football League following a 1–0 defeat away to champions Olympiacos. Apollon finished seventeenth with 36 points, two points off safety in fifteenth.

Sanchez declined to sign a new contract for Apollon and left the club. This departure was much to the chagrin of the Apollon fans to whom he, in typical Sanchez fashion, had become a much loved cult figure and leader. Sanchez wrote a parting letter to the Apollon fans explaining his thoughts and made it clear that he was very unhappy with the legitimacy of the Super League, his parting words were: "In the Magic Kingdom that is Super League even a Magician can only have so many powers".

== Honours ==
=== Reading ===
- Football League Fourth Division: 1978–79; promotion: 1983–84

=== Wimbledon ===
- FA Cup: 1987–88
- Football League Second Division promotion: 1985–86

== Managerial statistics ==
As of 12 July 2014.

Team	Nat	From	To	Record				
Team	Nat	From	To	G	W	D	L	Win %
Sligo Rovers	(Republic of Ireland)	2 September 1994	14 August 1995	46	18	10	18	39.13
Wycombe Wanderers	(England)	5 February 1999	30 September 2003	255	87	71	97	34.12
Northern Ireland	(Northern Ireland)	21 January 2004	11 May 2007	32	11	10	11	34.38
Fulham	(England)	11 April 2007	21 December 2007	24	4	8	12	16.67
Barnet	(England)	13 May 2011	16 April 2012	57	17	13	27	29.82
Apollon Smyrnis	(Greece)	17 November 2013	22 April 2014	27	8	7	12	29.63
Total				441	145	119	177	32.88
