= 1994–95 Wimbledon F.C. season =

Wimbledon F.C.
1994–95 season
- Chairman: Sam Hammam
- Manager: Joe Kinnear
- Stadium: Selhurst Park
- FA Premier League: 9th
- FA Cup: Fifth round
- League Cup: Third round
- Top goalscorer: Efan Ekoku (9)
- Highest home attendance: 18,224 vs Manchester United (7 Mar 1995, FA Premier League)
- Lowest home attendance: 2,451 vs Torquay United (20 Sep 1994, League Cup)
- Average home league attendance: 10,230
Home colours

During the 1994–95 English football season, Wimbledon F.C. competed in the FA Premier League, their ninth successive season in the top flight, and extended their stay at this level with a ninth-place finish.

== Season summary ==
Wimbledon failed to build upon their club-best finish of sixth place which had been achieved the previous season, but a ninth-place finish was still a showing for the only FA Premier League club without their own home, and also with the smallest resources and fan base at this level. Joe Kinnear's men maintained their reputation as one of the hardest Premier League sides to beat, and finished above many big-spending, well-supported clubs including Arsenal, Chelsea, Sheffield Wednesday and Everton.

Wimbledon's need to sell their biggest assets was highlighted in the close season when they sold full-back Warren Barton to Newcastle United for £4 million - the most expensive defender signed by any British club. However, many of their other key assets - Dean Holdsworth, Robbie Earle and Hans Segers included - were retained for the new season to give Dons fans hope of another season giving the big boys a run for their money.

Early in the season, long-serving striker John Fashanu departed to Aston Villa for £1.35 million, only to retire at the end of the campaign. In Fashanu's place, Wimbledon bought Efan Ekoku from Norwich City; he was the club's leading goalscorer with nine league goals.

== Kit ==
Wimbledon did not sign a kit manufacturing deal for the season's kit, instead producing them under their own brand. Birmingham-based electronics company Elonex became the kit sponsors.

== Final league table ==
Pos	Team	Pld	W	D	L	GF	GA	GD	Pts	Qualification or relegation
7	Tottenham Hotspur	42	16	14	12	66	58	+8	62	Qualification for the Intertoto Cup group stage
8	Queens Park Rangers	42	17	9	16	61	59	+2	60	
9	Wimbledon	42	15	11	16	48	65	−17	56	Qualification for the Intertoto Cup group stage
10	Southampton	42	12	18	12	61	63	−2	54	
11	Chelsea	42	13	15	14	50	55	−5	54	

Source: Premier League
Rules for classification: 1) points; 2) goal difference; 3) number of goals scored.

Results summary

Overall								Home						Away					
Pld	W	D	L	GF	GA	GD	Pts	W	D	L	GF	GA	GD	W	D	L	GF	GA	GD
42	15	11	16	48	65	−17	56	9	5	7	26	26	0	6	6	9	22	39	−17

Source: Statto

Results by round

Round	1	2	3	4	5	6	7	8	9	10	11	12	13	14	15	16	17	18	19	20	21	22	23	24	25	26	27	28	29	30	31	32	33	34	35	36	37	38	39	40	41	42
Ground	A	H	H	A	H	A	A	H	H	A	A	H	A	H	H	A	H	H	A	A	H	A	H	A	A	H	A	A	A	H	H	A	H	H	A	H	A	H	A	H	A	H
Result	D	D	L	L	W	D	W	L	L	L	L	W	L	W	W	L	L	W	D	W	W	D	W	W	L	D	L	L	W	L	L	W	W	W	W	D	L	L	D	D	D	D
Position	9	10	16	16	14	13	10	13	15	17	19	17	18	16	14	15	16	15	13	13	12	12	9	7	9	9	9	11	10	10	12	9	8	8	8	8	9	9	9	8	8	9

Source: Statto.com
A = Away; H = Home; W = Win; D = Draw; L = Loss

== Results ==
Wimbledon's score comes first

=== Legend ===
Win	Draw	Loss

=== FA Premier League ===
Date	Opponent	Venue	Result	Attendance	Scorers
20 August 1994	Coventry City	A	1–1	11,005	Castledine
23 August 1994	Ipswich Town	H	1–1	6,341	Holdsworth
27 August 1994	Sheffield Wednesday	H	0–1	7,453	
31 August 1994	Manchester United	A	0–3	43,440	
10 September 1994	Leicester City	H	2–1	7,683	Harford, Willis(og)
17 September 1994	Crystal Palace	A	0–0	12,366	
24 September 1994	Queens Park Rangers	A	1–0	11,061	Reeves
1 October 1994	Tottenham Hotspur	H	1–2	16,802	Talboys
8 October 1994	Arsenal	H	1–3	10,842	Jones
17 October 1994	Nottingham Forest	A	1–3	20,287	Gayle
22 October 1994	Liverpool	A	0–3	31,139	
30 October 1994	Norwich City	H	1–0	8,242	Ekoku
5 November 1994	Leeds United	A	1–3	27,246	Ekoku
9 November 1994	Aston Villa	H	4–3	6,221	Barton (pen), Ardley, Jones, Leonhardsen
19 November 1994	Newcastle United	H	3–2	14,203	Clarke, Ekoku, Harford
26 November 1994	Manchester City	A	0–2	21,131	
3 December 1994	Blackburn Rovers	H	0–3	12,341	
10 December 1994	Coventry City	H	2–0	7,349	Leonhardsen, Harford
16 December 1994	Ipswich Town	A	2–2	11,282	Holdsworth, Goodman
26 December 1994	Southampton	A	3–2	14,603	Holdsworth (2 1(pen)), Harford
28 December 1994	West Ham United	H	1–0	11,212	Fear
31 December 1994	Chelsea	A	1–1	16,009	Ekoku
2 January 1995	Everton	H	2–1	9,506	Harford (2)
14 January 1995	Norwich City	A	2–1	18,261	Reeves, Ekoku
25 January 1995	Newcastle United	A	1–2	34,374	Ekoku
4 February 1995	Leeds United	H	0–0	10,211	
11 February 1995	Aston Villa	A	1–7	23,582	Barton
22 February 1995	Blackburn Rovers	A	1–2	20,586	Ekoku
25 February 1995	Tottenham Hotspur	A	2–1	27,258	Ekoku (2)
4 March 1995	Queens Park Rangers	H	1–3	9,176	Holdsworth
7 March 1995	Manchester United	H	0–1	18,224	
11 March 1995	Sheffield Wednesday	A	1–0	20,395	Reeves
18 March 1995	Crystal Palace	H	2–0	8,835	Jones, Gayle
21 March 1995	Manchester City	H	2–0	5,268	Thorn, Elkins
1 April 1995	Leicester City	A	4–3	15,489	Goodman (2), Leonhardsen (2)
10 April 1995	Chelsea	H	1–1	7,022	Goodman
13 April 1995	West Ham United	A	0–3	21,804	
17 April 1995	Southampton	H	0–2	10,521	
29 April 1995	Everton	A	0–0	31,567	
2 May 1995	Liverpool	H	0–0	12,041	
4 May 1995	Arsenal	A	0–0	32,822	
13 May 1995	Nottingham Forest	H	2–2	15,341	Holdsworth (2 1(pen))

=== FA Cup ===
Round	Date	Opponent	Venue	Result	Attendance	Goalscorers
R3	7 January 1995	Colchester United	H	1–0	6,903	Harford
R4	29 January 1995	Tranmere Rovers	A	2–0	11,637	Leonhardsen, Earle
R5	19 February 1995	Liverpool	A	1–1	25,124	Clarke
R5R	28 February 1995	Liverpool	H	0–2	12,553	

=== League Cup ===
Round	Date	Opponent	Venue	Result	Attendance	Goalscorers
R2 1st Leg	20 September 1994	Torquay United	H	2–0	2,451	Gayle,
R2 2nd Leg	5 October 1994	Torquay United	A	1–0 (won 3–0 on agg)	4,244	Holdsworth
R3	25 October 1994	Crystal Palace	H	0–1	9,394	

== Players ==
=== First-team squad ===
Squad at end of season

Note: Flags indicate national team as defined under FIFA eligibility rules; some limited exceptions apply. Players may hold more than one non-FIFA nationality.

No.	Pos.	Nation	Player
1	GK	NED	Hans Segers
2	DF	ENG	Warren Barton
3	DF	SCO	Brian McAllister
4	MF	WAL	Vinnie Jones (Note: Jones was born in Watford, England, but also qualified to represent Wales through his maternal grandfather and made his international debut for Wales in December 1994.)
5	DF	ENG	Dean Blackwell
6	DF	IRL	Scott Fitzgerald (Note: Fitzgerald was born in Westminster, England, but also qualified to represent the Republic of Ireland internationally and represented them at U-21 and B level.)
7	FW	ENG	Andy Clarke
8	MF	ENG	Robbie Earle (Note: Earle was born in Newcastle-under-Lyme, England, and was called up for England without playing, but also qualified to represent Jamaica internationally and would make his international debut for Jamaica in 1997.)
9	FW	NGA	Efan Ekoku (Note: Ekoku was born in Cheetham, England, but also qualified to represent Nigeria internationally and made his international debut for Nigeria in 1994.)
10	FW	ENG	Dean Holdsworth
11	FW	ENG	Gary Blissett
12	DF	ENG	Gary Elkins
14	DF	ENG	Gerald Dobbs
15	DF	ENG	Alan Reeves
16	DF	ENG	Alan Kimble
17	DF	ENG	Roger Joseph
18	MF	ENG	Steve Talboys
19	MF	ENG	Stewart Castledine

No.	Pos.	Nation	Player
20	FW	ENG	Marcus Gayle (Note: Gayle was born in Hammersmith, London, and represented them at U-18 level, but also qualified to represent Jamaica internationally through his father and would make his international debut for Jamaica in 1998.)
21	DF	ENG	Chris Perry
22	MF	ENG	Aidan Newhouse
23	GK	ENG	Neil Sullivan (Note: Sullivan was born in Sutton, England, but also qualified to represent Scotland internationally and would make his international debut for Scotland in 1997.)
24	MF	ENG	Peter Fear
25	FW	ENG	Mick Harford
26	MF	ENG	Neal Ardley
27	DF	ENG	Justin Skinner
28	DF	ENG	Andy Thorn
29	FW	ENG	Grant Payne
30	MF	ENG	Mark Thomas
31	MF	ENG	Lenny Piper
32	MF	ENG	Gavin Fell
33	GK	IRL	Brendan Murphy
34	FW	ENG	Jason Euell (Note: Euell was born in Lambeth, England, and represented them at U-21 level, but also qualified to represent Jamaica internationally through his father and would make his international debut for Jamaica in November 2004.)
35	MF	NOR	Øyvind Leonhardsen
36	FW	ENG	Jon Goodman (Note: Goodman was born in Waltham Forest, England, but also qualified to represent the Republic of Ireland internationally and would make his international debut for the Republic of Ireland in 1997.)
37	DF	IRL	Kenny Cunningham

=== Left club during season ===
Note: Flags indicate national team as defined under FIFA eligibility rules; some limited exceptions apply. Players may hold more than one non-FIFA nationality.

No. / Pos. / Nation / Player; 13 / GK / ENG / Peter Shilton (to Bolton Wanderers)	No. / Pos. / Nation / Player; 15 / DF / ENG / John Scales (to Liverpool)

== Transfers ==
=== In ===
Date	Pos	Name	From	Fee
18 August 1994	FW	Mick Harford	Coventry City	£50,000
6 September 1994	DF	Alan Reeves	Rochdale	£200,000
26 September 1994	MF	Brendan Murphy	Bradford City	Free transfer
5 October 1994	DF	Andy Thorn	Crystal Palace	Free transfer
14 October 1994	FW	Efan Ekoku	Norwich City	£900,000
8 November 1994	MF	Øyvind Leonhardsen	Rosenborg	£650,000
9 November 1994	FW	Jon Goodman	Millwall	£650,000
9 November 1994	DF	Kenny Cunningham	Millwall	£650,000
10 February 1995	GK	Peter Shilton	Plymouth Argyle	Free transfer

=== Out ===
Date	Pos	Name	To	Fee
16 August 1994	MF	Paul Miller	Bristol Rovers	Signed
2 September 1994	DF	John Scales	Liverpool	£3,500,000
11 March 1995	GK	Peter Shilton	Bolton Wanderers	Free transfer

Transfers in: ▼£3,100,000
Transfers out: ▲£3,500,000
Total spending: ▲£400,000
