= 1995–96 Wimbledon F.C. season =

Wimbledon F.C.
1995–96 season
- Chairman: Sam Hammam
- Manager: Joe Kinnear
- Stadium: Selhurst Park
- FA Premier League: 14th
- FA Cup: Quarter-final
- League Cup: Second round
- UEFA Intertoto Cup: Group stage
- Top goalscorer: League: Robbie Earle (11); All: Efan Ekoku/Dean Holdsworth (16)
- Highest home attendance: 25,380 vs Manchester United (3 February 1996, FA Premier League)
- Lowest home attendance: 3,717 vs Charlton Athletic (19 September 1995, League Cup)
- Average home league attendance: 13,246
Home colours	Away colours

During the 1995–96 English football season, Wimbledon F.C. competed in the FA Premier League. It was their tenth successive season in the top flight of English football and although they finished 14th, lower than on any of the previous nine occasions, they finished high enough to maintain their top flight membership.

== Season summary ==
With the FA Premier League's lowest crowds and transfer budget, Wimbledon had begun most of their top division seasons since promotion in 1986 as pre-season relegation favourites, but the "Crazy Gang" spirit kept Wimbledon going once again, although their 14th-place finish was their lowest since joining the top flight 10 seasons earlier.

Dean Holdsworth and Efan Ekoku were once again a formidable strikerforce, while Vinnie Jones was as combative as ever and Oyvind Leonhardsen's performances attracted attention from several bigger clubs. Manager Joe Kinnear retained all his key players and added several new signings during the close season, as he aimed to defy expectations once again.

It was the last season at Wimbledon for long-serving goalkeeper Hans Segers, who lost his place early in the season to Paul Heald and was transferred to Wolves soon afterwards. Within a few months however, Kinnear had decided on Neil Sullivan as his regular goalkeeper.

The season saw Wimbledon play in European competition for the first (and the only) time in their history, in the Intertoto Cup. However, as Selhurst Park was unavailable the club were forced to play the matches at Brighton & Hove Albion's Goldstone Ground. The lack of home support affected Wimbledon's performances, and they finished fourth in their group of five after a 4–0 home defeat to Turkish club Bursaspor, a 1–1 draw at Slovak side Košice, a 0–0 draw with Israelis Beitar Jerusalem at home and a 3–0 away defeat at Belgian team Charleroi.

== Kit ==
Core became Wimbledon's kit manufacturers for the season. Birmingham-based electronics company Elonex remained the kit sponsors.

== Final league table ==
Pos	Team	Pld	W	D	L	GF	GA	GD	Pts
12	Middlesbrough	38	11	10	17	35	50	−15	43
13	Leeds United	38	12	7	19	40	57	−17	43
14	Wimbledon	38	10	11	17	55	70	−15	41
15	Sheffield Wednesday	38	10	10	18	48	61	−13	40
16	Coventry City	38	8	14	16	42	60	−18	38

Source: Premier League
Rules for classification: 1) points; 2) goal difference; 3) number of goals scored.

Results summary

Overall								Home						Away					
Pld	W	D	L	GF	GA	GD	Pts	W	D	L	GF	GA	GD	W	D	L	GF	GA	GD
38	10	11	17	55	70	−15	41	5	6	8	27	33	−6	5	5	9	28	37	−9

Source: Statto

Results by round

Round	1	2	3	4	5	6	7	8	9	10	11	12	13	14	15	16	17	18	19	20	21	22	23	24	25	26	27	28	29	30	31	32	33	34	35	36	37	38
Ground	H	A	A	H	H	A	H	A	H	A	H	A	H	A	A	H	A	H	H	A	A	H	A	H	H	A	H	H	A	H	A	H	A	H	A	A	H	A
Result	W	W	L	D	W	L	L	L	L	L	L	L	D	L	D	D	D	L	D	W	W	L	L	W	L	L	D	D	D	L	W	W	D	W	W	L	L	D
Position	4	2	3	6	3	6	9	11	12	14	15	17	16	17	16	17	17	18	18	16	15	15	15	14	16	16	16	15	15	17	15	15	15	15	14	14	14	14

Source: Statto.com
A = Away; H = Home; W = Win; D = Draw; L = Loss

== Results ==
Wimbledon's score comes first

=== Legend ===
Win	Draw	Loss

=== FA Premier League ===
Date	Opponent	Venue	Result	Attendance	Scorers
19 August 1995	Bolton Wanderers	H	3–2	9,317	Ekoku, Earle, Holdsworth
23 August 1995	Queens Park Rangers	A	3–0	11,837	Leonhardsen, Holdsworth, Goodman
26 August 1995	Manchester United	A	1–3	32,226	Earle
30 August 1995	Sheffield Wednesday	H	2–2	6,352	Goodman, Holdsworth (pen)
9 September 1995	Liverpool	H	1–0	19,530	Harford
16 September 1995	Aston Villa	A	0–2	26,928	
23 September 1995	Leeds United	H	2–4	13,307	Holdsworth, Reeves
30 September 1995	Tottenham Hotspur	A	1–3	25,321	Earle
16 October 1995	West Ham United	H	0–1	9,411	
21 October 1995	Newcastle United	A	1–6	36,434	Gayle
28 October 1995	Southampton	H	1–2	7,982	Euell
6 November 1995	Nottingham Forest	A	1–4	20,810	Jones
18 November 1995	Middlesbrough	H	0–0	13,780	
22 November 1995	Manchester City	A	0–1	23,617	
25 November 1995	Coventry City	A	3–3	12,523	Jones (pen), Goodman, Leonhardsen
3 December 1995	Newcastle United	H	3–3	18,002	Holdsworth (2), Ekoku
9 December 1995	Leeds United	A	1–1	27,984	Leonhardsen
16 December 1995	Tottenham Hotspur	H	0–1	16,193	
23 December 1995	Blackburn Rovers	H	1–1	7,105	Earle
26 December 1995	Chelsea	A	2–1	21,906	Earle, Ekoku
30 December 1995	Arsenal	A	3–1	37,640	Earle (2), Holdsworth
1 January 1996	Everton	H	2–3	11,121	Holdsworth, Ekoku
13 January 1996	Bolton Wanderers	A	0–1	16,216	
20 January 1996	Queens Park Rangers	H	2–1	9,123	Leonhardsen, Clarke
3 February 1996	Manchester United	H	2–4	25,380	Gayle, Euell
10 February 1996	Sheffield Wednesday	A	1–2	19,085	Gayle
24 February 1996	Aston Villa	H	3–3	12,193	Goodman (2), Harford
2 March 1996	Chelsea	H	1–1	17,048	S. Clarke (own goal)
13 March 1996	Liverpool	A	2–2	34,063	Ekoku, Holdsworth
16 March 1996	Arsenal	H	0–3	18,335	
23 March 1996	Everton	A	4–2	31,382	Gayle, Castledine, Clarke, Goodman
30 March 1996	Nottingham Forest	H	1–0	9,807	Holdsworth
6 April 1996	West Ham United	A	1–1	20,402	Jones
8 April 1996	Manchester City	H	3–0	11,844	Earle (2), Ekoku
13 April 1996	Middlesbrough	A	2–1	29,192	Earle, Ekoku
17 April 1996	Blackburn Rovers	A	2–3	24,174	Earle, Gayle
27 April 1996	Coventry City	H	0–2	15,540	
5 May 1996	Southampton	A	0–0	15,172	

=== FA Cup ===
Round	Date	Opponent	Venue	Result	Attendance	Goalscorers
R3	6 January 1996	Watford	A	1–1	11,187	Leonhardsen
R3R	17 January 1996	Watford	H	1–0	5,142	Clarke
R4	7 February 1996	Middlesbrough	A	0–0	28,915	
R4R	13 February 1996	Middlesbrough	H	1–0	5,520	Holdsworth
R5	17 February 1996	Huddersfield Town	A	2–2	17,307	Ekoku (2)
R5R	28 February 1996	Huddersfield Town	H	3–1	7,015	Ekoku, Goodman (2)
QF	9 March 1996	Chelsea	A	2–2	30,805	Holdsworth, Earle
QFR	20 March 1996	Chelsea	H	1–3	21,380	Goodman

=== League Cup ===
Round	Date	Opponent	Venue	Result	Attendance	Goalscorers
R2 1st Leg	19 September 1995	Charlton Athletic	H	4–5	3,717	Holdsworth (2), Earle, Clarke
R2 2nd Leg	3 October 1995	Charlton Athletic	A	3–3 (lost 7–8 on agg)	9,823	Earle, Holdsworth (2, 1 pen)

=== UEFA Intertoto Cup ===
Round	Date	Opponent	Venue	Result	Attendance	Goalscorers
Group 10	24 June 1995	Bursaspor	H	0–4	1,879	
Group 10	2 July 1995	Košice	A	1–1	4,023	Piper
Group 10	15 July 1995	Beitar Jerusalem	H	0–0	702	
Group 10	22 July 1995	Charleroi	A	0–3	2,014	

Note: Home games in the Intertoto Cup were played at the Goldstone Ground due to unavailability of White Hart Lane

== Players ==
=== First-team squad ===
Squad at end of season Note: Flags indicate national team as defined under FIFA eligibility rules; some limited exceptions apply. Players may hold more than one non-FIFA nationality.

No.	Pos.	Nation	Player
1	GK	NED	Hans Segers
2	DF	IRL	Kenny Cunningham
3	DF	ENG	Alan Kimble
4	MF	WAL	Vinnie Jones (Note: Jones was born in Watford, England, but also qualified to represent Wales through his maternal grandfather and made his international debut for Wales in December 1994.)
5	DF	ENG	Dean Blackwell
6	DF	IRL	Scott Fitzgerald (Note: Fitzgerald was born in Westminster, England, but also qualified to represent the Republic of Ireland internationally and represented them at U-21 and B level.)
7	MF	NOR	Øyvind Leonhardsen
8	MF	ENG	Robbie Earle (Note: Earle was born in Newcastle-under-Lyme, England, and was called up for England without playing, but also qualified to represent Jamaica internationally and would make his international debut for Jamaica in 1997.)
9	FW	NGA	Efan Ekoku (Note: Ekoku was born in Cheetham, England, but also qualified to represent Nigeria internationally and made his international debut for Nigeria in 1994.)
10	FW	ENG	Dean Holdsworth
11	FW	ENG	Marcus Gayle (Note: Gayle was born in Hammersmith, London, and represented them at U-18 level, but also qualified to represent Jamaica internationally through his father and would make his international debut for Jamaica in 1998.)
12	DF	ENG	Gary Elkins
13	GK	ENG	Paul Heald
14	FW	ENG	Jon Goodman (Note: Goodman was born in Waltham Forest, England, but also qualified to represent the Republic of Ireland internationally and would make his debut for the Republic of Ireland in 1997.)
15	DF	ENG	Alan Reeves
16	DF	ENG	Andy Thorn
17	DF	SCO	Brian McAllister
18	MF	ENG	Neal Ardley

No.	Pos.	Nation	Player
19	MF	ENG	Stewart Castledine
20	FW	ENG	Mick Harford
21	DF	ENG	Chris Perry
22	FW	ENG	Andy Clarke
23	GK	ENG	Neil Sullivan (Note: Sullivan was born in Sutton, England, but also qualified to represent Scotland internationally and made his international debut for Scotland in 1997.)
24	MF	ENG	Peter Fear
25	FW	ENG	Gary Blissett
26	MF	ENG	Aidan Newhouse
27	FW	ENG	Grant Payne
28	MF	ENG	Steve Talboys
29	DF	ENG	Gerald Dobbs
30	DF	ENG	Roger Joseph
31	MF	ENG	Mark Thomas
32	DF	ENG	Justin Skinner
33	GK	IRL	Brendan Murphy
34	MF	ENG	Jason Euell (Note: Euell was born in Lambeth, England, and represented them at U-21 level, but also qualified to represent Jamaica internationally through his father and would make his international debut for Jamaica in November 2004.)
35	DF	ENG	Andy Pearce

=== Left club during the season ===
Note: Flags indicate national team as defined under FIFA eligibility rules; some limited exceptions apply. Players may hold more than one non-FIFA nationality.

No.	Pos.	Nation	Player
35	GK	ENG	Simon Tracey (on loan from Sheffield United)

=== Others ===
Iain Laidlaw (born 10 December 1976) is a defender who had represented the club in the 1995 UEFA Intertoto Cup, signed for the club that summer, but was released in 1997 without making a league appearance.

== Transfers ==
=== In ===
Date	Pos	Name	From	Fee
25 July 1995	GK	Paul Heald	Leyton Orient	£125,000

=== Out ===
Date	Pos	Name	From	Fee
5 June 1995	DF	Warren Barton	Newcastle United	£4,000,000
8 August 1995	FW	Steve Anthrobus	Shrewsbury Town	£25,000

Transfers in: ▼£125,000
Transfers out: ▲£4,025,000
Total spending: ▲£3,900,000
