= 1993–94 Wimbledon F.C. season =

Wimbledon
1993–94 season
- Chairman: Sam Hammam
- Manager: Joe Kinnear
- Stadium: Selhurst Park
- FA Premier League: 6th
- FA Cup: Fifth round
- League Cup: Fifth round
- Top goalscorer: Dean Holdsworth (24)
- Average home league attendance: 10,474
Home colours

During the 1993–94 English football season, Wimbledon F.C. competed in the FA Premier League and finished the season in sixth place, equalling their best ever league finish which had previously been set in 1987.

== Season summary ==
Those who thought that Wimbledon, the Premiership's smallest side in terms of financial resources and fan base (and without even their own home), would not sustain themselves in the Premier League were quickly proven wrong. The consistent goalscoring of striker Dean Holdsworth returned Wimbledon to their winning ways after two mediocre seasons and they quickly re-established themselves as one of the hardest-to-beat sides in England. They finished sixth in the table - equalling their highest-ever finish - and, of all the London clubs, only Arsenal finished above them. They also finished two places above Liverpool - the dominant English side of the previous two decades - and four places above the previous season’s league runners-up Aston Villa, also inflicting one of just four league defeats suffered by double winners Manchester United.

== Kit ==
Ribero became Wimbledon's new kit manufacturers, while London radio station LBC became the kit sponsors. The kit saw Wimbledon wear navy shirts for the first time since 1893; they were matched with navy shorts and socks for the first time in Wimbledon's history.

== Final league table ==
Pos	Team	Pld	W	D	L	GF	GA	GD	Pts	Qualification or relegation
4	Arsenal	42	18	17	7	53	28	+25	71	Qualification for the Cup Winners' Cup first round (Note: Arsenal qualified for the Cup Winners' Cup as the defending champions.)
5	Leeds United	42	18	16	8	65	39	+26	70	
6	Wimbledon	42	18	11	13	56	53	+3	65	
7	Sheffield Wednesday	42	16	16	10	76	54	+22	64	
8	Liverpool	42	17	9	16	59	55	+4	60	

Source: Premier League
Rules for classification: 1) points; 2) goal difference; 3) number of goals scored.

== Results ==
Wimbledon's score comes first

=== Legend ===
Win	Draw	Loss

=== FA Premier League ===
Date	Opponent	Venue	Result	Attendance	Scorers
14 August 1993	West Ham United	A	2–0	20,363	Fashanu, Sanchez
17 August 1993	Chelsea	H	1–1	11,083	Fashanu
21 August 1993	Aston Villa	H	2–2	7,533	Fashanu, Holdsworth
24 August 1993	Sheffield United	A	1–2	15,555	Clarke
28 August 1993	Oldham Athletic	A	1–1	9,633	Jones
31 August 1993	Southampton	H	1–0	6,036	Barton
11 September 1993	Norwich City	A	1–0	14,851	Sanchez
20 September 1993	Manchester City	H	1–0	8,481	Earle
27 September 1993	Queens Park Rangers	H	1–1	9,478	Ferdinand (own goal)
2 October 1993	Leeds United	A	0–4	30,020	
16 October 1993	Sheffield Wednesday	A	2–2	21,752	Jones, Blissett
25 October 1993	Ipswich Town	H	0–2	7,756	
30 October 1993	Newcastle United	A	0–4	33,392	
6 November 1993	Swindon Town	H	3–0	7,758	Fashanu, Blissett, Holdsworth
20 November 1993	Manchester United	A	1–3	44,748	Fashanu
24 November 1993	Tottenham Hotspur	A	1–1	17,744	Holdsworth
27 November 1993	Everton	H	1–1	6,934	Berry
4 December 1993	West Ham United	H	1–2	10,903	Holdsworth
11 December 1993	Aston Villa	A	1–0	17,940	Holdsworth
18 December 1993	Sheffield United	H	2–0	21,566	Barton, Holdsworth
26 December 1993	Coventry City	H	1–2	4,739	Holdsworth
28 December 1993	Liverpool	A	1–1	32,232	Fashanu
1 January 1994	Arsenal	H	0–3	16,584	
15 January 1994	Sheffield Wednesday	H	2–1	5,536	Ardley, Fashanu
22 January 1994	Ipswich Town	A	0–0	12,372	
5 February 1994	Blackburn Rovers	A	0–3	16,215	
12 February 1994	Newcastle United	H	4–2	13,358	Blissett, Earle, Fashanu, Holdsworth
26 February 1994	Southampton	A	0–1	14,790	
5 March 1994	Norwich City	H	3–1	7,206	Earle (2), Holdsworth
12 March 1994	Manchester City	A	1–0	23,981	Earle
16 March 1994	Chelsea	A	0–2	11,903	
19 March 1994	Queens Park Rangers	A	0–1	11,368	
26 March 1994	Leeds United	H	1–0	9,035	Fear
29 March 1994	Blackburn Rovers	H	4–1	10,537	Fashanu, Berg (own goal), Holdsworth, Earle
2 April 1994	Coventry City	A	2–1	11,290	Castledine, Holdsworth
4 April 1994	Liverpool	H	1–1	13,819	Elkins
16 April 1994	Manchester United	H	1–0	28,553	Fashanu
19 April 1994	Arsenal	A	1–1	21,292	Earle
23 April 1994	Swindon Town	A	4–2	12,237	Fashanu, Holdsworth, Earle (2)
26 April 1994	Oldham Athletic	H	3–0	6,766	Holdsworth (3)
30 April 1994	Tottenham Hotspur	H	2–1	20,875	Holdsworth, Clarke
7 May 1994	Everton	A	2–3	31,297	Holdsworth, Ablett (own goal)

=== FA Cup ===
Round	Date	Opponent	Venue	Result	Attendance	Goalscorers
R3	8 January 1994	Scunthorpe United	H	3–0	4,944	Holdsworth (3)
R4	29 January 1994	Sunderland	H	2–1	10,477	Scales, Fashanu
R5	20 February 1994	Manchester United	H	0–3	27,511	

=== League Cup ===
Round	Date	Opponent	Venue	Result	Attendance	Goalscorers
R2 1st leg	22 September 1993	Hereford United	A	1–0	4,872	Clarke
R2 2nd leg	5 October 1993	Hereford United	H	4–1 (won 5–1 on agg)	2,151	Jones, Ardley, Holdsworth, Earle
R3	27 October 1993	Newcastle United	H	2–1	11,531	Barton, Holdsworth
R4	1 December 1993	Liverpool	A	1–1	19,290	Earle
R4R	14 December 1993	Liverpool	H	2–2 (won 4–3 on pens)	11,343	Holdsworth, Earle
R5	11 January 1994	Sheffield Wednesday	H	1–2	8,784	Holdsworth

== Players ==
=== First-team squad ===
Squad at end of season

Note: Flags indicate national team as defined under FIFA eligibility rules; some limited exceptions apply. Players may hold more than one non-FIFA nationality.

No.	Pos.	Nation	Player
1	GK	NED	Hans Segers
2	DF	ENG	Warren Barton
3	DF	SCO	Brian McAllister
4	MF	ENG	Vinnie Jones (Note: Jones was born in Watford, England, but also qualified to represent Wales through his maternal grandfather and would make his international debut for Wales in December 1994.)
5	DF	ENG	Dean Blackwell
6	DF	IRL	Scott Fitzgerald (Note: Fitzgerald was born in Westminster, England, but also qualified to represent the Republic of Ireland internationally and represented them at U-21 and B level.)
7	FW	ENG	Andy Clarke
8	MF	ENG	Robbie Earle (Note: Earle was born in Newcastle-under-Lyme, England, and was called up for England without playing, but also qualified to represent Jamaica internationally and would make his international debut for Jamaica in 1997.)
9	FW	ENG	John Fashanu
10	FW	ENG	Dean Holdsworth
11	MF	ENG	Paul Miller
12	FW	ENG	Steve Anthrobus
14	DF	ENG	Gerald Dobbs
15	DF	ENG	John Scales
16	FW	IRL	Paul McGee
17	DF	ENG	Roger Joseph
18	MF	ENG	Steve Talboys

No.	Pos.	Nation	Player
19	MF	ENG	Stewart Castledine
20	FW	ENG	Marcus Gayle (Note: Gayle was born in Hammersmith, London, and represented them at U-18 level, but also qualified to represent Jamaica internationally through his father and would make his international debut for Jamaica in 1998.)
21	DF	ENG	Chris Perry
22	MF	ENG	Aidan Newhouse
23	GK	ENG	Neil Sullivan (Note: Sullivan was born in Sutton, England, but also qualified to represent Scotland internationally and would make his international debut for Scotland in 1997.)
24	MF	ENG	Peter Fear
25	FW	ENG	Leighton Allen
26	MF	ENG	Neal Ardley
27	DF	ENG	Justin Skinner
29	FW	ENG	Grant Payne
30	MF	ENG	Mark Thomas
31	DF	ENG	Marc Cable
32	GK	ENG	Neil Fairbairn
33	DF	ENG	Gary Elkins
35	DF	ENG	Alan Kimble
36	FW	ENG	Gary Blissett

=== Left the club during season ===
Note: Flags indicate national team as defined under FIFA eligibility rules; some limited exceptions apply. Players may hold more than one non-FIFA nationality.

No.	Pos.	Nation	Player
20	MF	NIR	Lawrie Sanchez (Note: Sanchez was born in Lambeth, England, and represented them at schoolboy level, but also qualified to represent Ecuador internationally through his father and Northern Ireland internationally through his mother and made his international debut for Northern Ireland in 1986.) (to Swindon Town)
34	MF	ENG	Greg Berry (to Millwall)

No.	Pos.	Nation	Player
37	GK	ENG	Perry Digweed (to Watford)
