= 1998–99 Wimbledon F.C. season =

Wimbledon F.C.
1998–99 season
- Chairman: Sam Hammam
- Manager: Joe Kinnear
- Stadium: Selhurst Park
- FA Premier League: 16th
- FA Cup: Fourth round
- League Cup: Semi-finals
- Top goalscorer: League: Jason Euell/Marcus Gayle (10); All: Marcus Gayle (11)
- Highest home attendance: 26,121 (vs. Manchester United, 3 April)
- Lowest home attendance: 3,756 (vs. Portsmouth, 22 September)
- Average home league attendance: 18,207

During the 1998–99 English football season, Wimbledon F.C. competed in the FA Premier League.

== Season summary ==
Wimbledon started the season well, reaching the semi-finals of the League Cup for the second time in their history, and as March arrived Wimbledon were sixth in the table with 11 matches to go, and in the hunt for a League Cup place. They had also reached the semi finals of the League Cup

The signing of striker John Hartson from top-five rivals West Ham United for a club record £7.5 million in January looked to be crucial signing the South London club needed for European qualification, but after his arrival the club suffered a slump in form, winning only one more game all season and taking only 2 points from their last 11 games to fall to 16th in the final table, their lowest finish in 13 seasons of top flight football.

Manager Joe Kinnear resigned at the end of the season on health grounds after seven years in charge, having suffered heart problems before a match at Sheffield Wednesday in March. He was succeeded by former Norwegian national coach Egil Olsen, who had frequently spoken of his admiration of Wimbledon and had transformed Norway into a leading international side with long-ball tactics similar to those employed by Kinnear.

== Final league table ==
Pos	Team	Pld	W	D	L	GF	GA	GD	Pts	Qualification or relegation
14	Everton	38	11	10	17	42	47	−5	43	
15	Coventry City	38	11	9	18	39	51	−12	42	
16	Wimbledon	38	10	12	16	40	63	−23	42	
17	Southampton	38	11	8	19	37	64	−27	41	
18	Charlton Athletic (R)	38	8	12	18	41	56	−15	36	Relegation to Football League First Division

Source: Premier League
Rules for classification: 1) points; 2) goal difference; 3) number of goals scored.
(R) Relegated

Results summary

Overall								Home						Away					
Pld	W	D	L	GF	GA	GD	Pts	W	D	L	GF	GA	GD	W	D	L	GF	GA	GD
38	10	12	16	40	63	−23	42	7	7	5	22	21	+1	3	5	11	18	42	−24

Source: 1998-99 FA Premier League table

Results by round

Round	1	2	3	4	5	6	7	8	9	10	11	12	13	14	15	16	17	18	19	20	21	22	23	24	25	26	27	28	29	30	31	32	33	34	35	36	37	38
Ground	H	A	H	A	A	H	A	H	A	H	H	A	A	H	A	H	H	A	H	A	H	A	H	A	H	A	A	H	H	A	H	A	H	A	H	A	H	A
Result	W	D	D	W	L	W	D	L	L	D	D	W	L	W	L	W	W	L	W	D	W	D	D	L	D	D	W	L	L	L	D	L	L	L	D	L	L	L
Position	1	3	4	4	6	4	3	5	11	12	12	7	10	8	9	8	8	8	8	9	6	7	7	8	9	9	6	6	8	8	10	11	11	12	13	13	15	16

Source: Soccerbase: 1998-99 Wimbledon results
A = Away; H = Home; W = Win; D = Draw; L = Loss

== Results ==
Wimbledon's score comes first

=== Legend ===
Win	Draw	Loss

=== FA Premier League ===
Date	Opponent	Venue	Result	Attendance	Scorers
15 August 1998	Tottenham Hotspur	H	3–1	23,031	Earle, Ekoku (2)
22 August 1998	Derby County	A	0–0	25,747	
29 August 1998	Leeds United	H	1–1	16,437	Hughes
9 September 1998	West Ham United	A	4–3	25,311	Gayle (2), Euell, Ekoku
12 September 1998	Aston Villa	A	0–2	32,959	
19 September 1998	Sheffield Wednesday	H	2–1	13,163	Euell (2)
27 September 1998	Leicester City	A	1–1	17,725	Earle
3 October 1998	Everton	H	1–2	16,054	Roberts
17 October 1998	Manchester United	A	1–5	55,265	Euell
24 October 1998	Middlesbrough	H	2–2	14,114	Gayle (2)
31 October 1998	Blackburn Rovers	H	1–1	12,526	Earle
7 November 1998	Nottingham Forest	A	1–0	21,362	Gayle
14 November 1998	Chelsea	A	0–3	34,757	
21 November 1998	Arsenal	H	1–0	26,003	Ekoku
28 November 1998	Newcastle United	A	1–3	36,623	Gayle
5 December 1998	Coventry City	H	2–1	11,717	Euell (2)
13 December 1998	Liverpool	H	1–0	26,080	Earle
19 December 1998	Southampton	A	1–3	14,354	Gayle
26 December 1998	Charlton Athletic	H	2–1	19,106	Euell, Hughes
29 December 1998	Leeds United	A	2–2	39,816	Earle, Cort
9 January 1999	Derby County	H	2–1	12,732	Euell, Roberts
16 January 1999	Tottenham Hotspur	A	0–0	32,422	
30 January 1999	West Ham United	H	0–0	23,035	
8 February 1999	Charlton Athletic	A	0–2	20,002	
21 February 1999	Aston Villa	H	0–0	15,582	
27 February 1999	Everton	A	1–1	32,574	Ekoku
3 March 1999	Sheffield Wednesday	A	2–1	24,116	Ekoku, Gayle
6 March 1999	Leicester City	H	0–1	11,801	
13 March 1999	Nottingham Forest	H	1–3	12,149	Gayle
20 March 1999	Blackburn Rovers	A	1–3	21,754	Euell
3 April 1999	Manchester United	H	1–1	26,121	Euell
5 April 1999	Middlesbrough	A	1–3	33,999	Cort
11 April 1999	Chelsea	H	1–2	21,577	Gayle
19 April 1999	Arsenal	A	1–5	37,982	Cort
24 April 1999	Newcastle United	H	1–1	21,172	Hartson
1 May 1999	Coventry City	A	1–2	21,200	Hartson
8 May 1999	Southampton	H	0–2	24,068	
16 May 1999	Liverpool	A	0–3	41,902	

=== FA Cup ===
Round	Date	Opponent	Venue	Result	Attendance	Goalscorers
R3	2 January 1999	Manchester City	H	1–0	11,226	Cort
R4	23 January 1999	Tottenham Hotspur	H	1–1	22,229	Earle
R4R	2 February 1999	Tottenham Hotspur	A	0–3	24,049	

=== League Cup ===
Round	Date	Opponent	Venue	Result	Attendance	Goalscorers
R2 1st Leg	15 September 1998	Portsmouth	A	1–2	7,010	Ekoku
R2 2nd Leg	22 September 1998	Portsmouth	H	4–1 (won 5–3 on agg)	3,756	Ardley, Ekoku (2), Leaburn
R3	28 October 1998	Birmingham City	A	2–1	11,845	Ardley (2)
R4	10 November 1998	Bolton Wanderers	A	2–1	7,868	Gayle, Kennedy
QF	1 December 1998	Chelsea	H	2–1	19,286	Earle, Hughes (pen)
SF 1st Leg	27 January 1999	Tottenham Hotspur	A	0–0	35,997	
SF 2nd Leg	16 February 1999	Tottenham Hotspur	H	0–1 (lost 0–1 on agg)	25,204	

== Players ==
=== First-team squad ===
Squad at end of season

Note: Flags indicate national team as defined under FIFA eligibility rules; some limited exceptions apply. Players may hold more than one non-FIFA nationality.

No.	Pos.	Nation	Player
1	GK	SCO	Neil Sullivan (Note: Sullivan was born in Sutton, England, but also qualified to represent Scotland internationally and made his international debut for Scotland in 1997.)
2	DF	IRL	Kenny Cunningham
3	DF	ENG	Alan Kimble
4	DF	ENG	Chris Perry
5	DF	ENG	Dean Blackwell
6	DF	ENG	Ben Thatcher (Note: Thatcher was born in Swindon, England and represented them at U-21 level, but also qualified to represent Wales internationally through his grandmother and made his international debut for Wales in March 2004.)
7	MF	WAL	Ceri Hughes
8	MF	JAM	Robbie Earle (Note: Earle was born in Newcastle-under-Lyme, England, and was called up for England without playing, but also qualified to represent Jamaica internationally and made his international debut for Jamaica in 1997.)
9	FW	NGA	Efan Ekoku (Note: Ekoku was born in Cheetham, England, but also qualified to represent Nigeria internationally and made his international debut for Nigeria in 1994.)
10	MF	ENG	Andy Roberts
11	FW	JAM	Marcus Gayle (Note: Gayle was born in Hammersmith, London, and represented them at U-18 level, but also qualified to represent Jamaica internationally through his father and made his international debut for Jamaica in 1998.)
12	MF	ENG	Neal Ardley
13	GK	ENG	Paul Heald
14	FW	IRL	Jon Goodman (Note: Goodman was born in Waltham Forest, England, but also qualified to represent the Republic of Ireland internationally and made his debut for the Republic of Ireland in 1997.)
15	FW	ENG	Carl Leaburn
16	MF	NIR	Michael Hughes
17	DF	SCO	Brian McAllister

No.	Pos.	Nation	Player
18	MF	IRL	Mark Kennedy
19	MF	ENG	Stewart Castledine
20	FW	ENG	Jason Euell (Note: Euell was born in Lambeth, England, and represented them at U-21 level, but also qualified to represent Jamaica internationally through his father and would make his international debut for Jamaica in November 2004.)
21	DF	SCO	Duncan Jupp (Note: Jupp was born in Haslemere, England, but also qualified to represent Scotland internationally and represented them at U-21 level.)
22	FW	ENG	Andy Clarke
23	FW	ENG	Carl Cort (Note: Cort was born in Southwark, England, but also qualified to represent Guyana internationally and would make his international debut for Guyana in 2011.)
24	MF	ENG	Peter Fear
25	DF	ENG	Andy Pearce
26	MF	ENG	Gareth Ainsworth
27	MF	ENG	Damien Francis (Note: Francis was born in Wandsworth, England, but also qualified to represent Jamaica internationally and would make his international debut for Jamaica in 2003.)
28	FW	ENG	Richard O'Connor (Note: O'Connor was born in Wandsworth, England, but also qualified to represent Anguilla internationally and would make his international debut for Anguilla in 2000.)
29	FW	WAL	John Hartson
30	DF	ENG	Peter Hawkins
31	DF	ENG	Danny Hodges
33	GK	IRL	Brendan Murphy
35	FW	ENG	Patrick Agyemang (Note: Agyemang was born in Waltham Forest, England, but also qualified to represent Ghana internationally and would make his international debut for Ghana in May 2003.)

=== Left club during season ===
Note: Flags indicate national team as defined under FIFA eligibility rules; some limited exceptions apply. Players may hold more than one non-FIFA nationality.

No. / Pos. / Nation / Player; 32 / GK / NOR / Morten Bakke (on loan from Molde)	No. / Pos. / Nation / Player; 34 / GK / ENG / Brian Parkin (to Brighton & Hove Albion)

=== Reserve squad ===
Note: Flags indicate national team as defined under FIFA eligibility rules; some limited exceptions apply. Players may hold more than one non-FIFA nationality.

No.	Pos.	Nation	Player
—	GK	ENG	Shane Gore
—	GK	ENG	Bryn Halliwell
—	DF	ENG	Rob Gier (Note: Gier was born in Ascot, England, but also qualified to represent the Philippines internationally through his mother and would make his international debut for the Philippines in April 2009.)
—	DF	ENG	Samuel Okikiolu
—	MF	ENG	Mikele Leigertwood (Note: Leigertwood was born in Enfield, England, but also qualified to represent Antigua and Barbuda internationally and would make his international debut for Antigua and Barbuda in November 2008.)

No.	Pos.	Nation	Player
—	MF	ENG	Ansah Owusu
—	FW	ENG	Wayne Gray
—	FW	ENG	Leigh Hinds
—	FW	IRL	Stephen O'Flynn

== Transfers ==
=== In ===
Date	Pos.	Name	From	Fee
29 October 1998	MF	Gareth Ainsworth	Port Vale	£2,000,000
14 January 1999	FW	John Hartson	West Ham United	£7,500,000

=== Out ===
Date	Pos.	Name	To	Fee
15 June 1998	DF	Alan Reeves	Swindon Town	Free transfer
1 August 1998	MF	Ståle Solbakken	Aalborg BK	Undisclosed

Transfers in: ▼£9,500,000
Transfers out: ▲£0
Total spending: ▼£9,500,000

== Appearances and goals ==
Numbers in parentheses denote appearances as substitute.
Players with names struck through and marked † left the club during the playing season.
Players with names in italics and marked * were on loan from another club for the whole of their season with Burnley.
Players listed with no appearances have been in the matchday squad but only as unused substitutes.
Key to positions: GK – Goalkeeper; DF – Defender; MF – Midfielder; FW – Forward

Players contracted for the 1998–99 season
No.	Pos.	Nat.	Name	FA Premier League		FA Cup		League Cup		Total	
No.	Pos.	Nat.	Name	Apps	Goals	Apps	Goals	Apps	Goals	Apps	Goals
1	GK	SCO	Neil Sullivan	38	0	3	0	5	0	46	0
2	DF	IRL	Kenny Cunningham	35	0	2	0	6 (1)	0	43 (1)	0
3	DF	ENG	Alan Kimble	22 (4)	0	2	0	1 (2)	0	25 (6)	0
4	DF	ENG	Chris Perry	34	0	2	0	7	0	43	0
5	DF	ENG	Dean Blackwell	27 (1)	0	2	0	4	0	33 (1)	0
6	DF	ENG	Ben Thatcher	31	0	2	0	7	0	40	0
7	MF	WAL	Ceri Hughes	8 (6)	0	0 (3)	0	0 (1)	0	8 (10)	0
8	MF	JAM	Robbie Earle	35	5	3	1	5	1	43	7
9	FW	NGA	Efan Ekoku	11 (11)	6	0	0	4 (1)	3	15 (12)	9
10	MF	ENG	Andy Roberts	23 (5)	2	2 (1)	0	3 (1)	0	28 (7)	2
11	FW	JAM	Marcus Gayle	31 (4)	10	1	0	4	1	36 (4)	11
12	MF	ENG	Neal Ardley	16 (7)	0	3	0	5	3	24 (7)	3
13	GK	ENG	Paul Heald	0	0	0	0	2	0	2	0
14	FW	IRL	Jon Goodman	0 (1)	0	0	0	0	0	0 (1)	0
15	FW	ENG	Carl Leaburn	14 (8)	0	3	0	3 (4)	1	20 (12)	1
16	MF	NIR	Michael Hughes	28 (2)	2	2	0	4	1	34 (2)	1
17	DF	SCO	Brian McAllister	0	0	0	0	1	0	1	0
18	MF	IRL	Mark Kennedy	7 (10)	0	2	0	4 (1)	1	13 (11)	1
19	MF	ENG	Stewart Castledine	1	0	0	0	0	0	1	0
20	FW	ENG	Jason Euell	31 (2)	10	3	0	5 (2)	0	39 (4)	10
21	DF	SCO	Duncan Jupp	3 (3)	0	1	0	2	0	6 (3)	0
22	FW	ENG	Andy Clarke	0	0	0	0	0	0	0	0
23	FW	ENG	Carl Cort	6 (10)	3	0 (3)	1	2 (1)	0	8 (14)	4
24	MF	ENG	Peter Fear	0 (2)	0	0	0	1	0	1 (2)	0
25	DF	ENG	Andy Pearce	0	0	0	0	0	0	0	0
26	MF	ENG	Gareth Ainsworth	5 (3)	0	0	0	0	0	5 (3)	0
27	MF	ENG	Damien Francis	0	0	0	0	2	0	2	0
28	FW	ENG	Richard O'Connor	0	0	0	0	0	0	0	0
29	FW	WAL	John Hartson	12 (2)	2	0	0	0	0	12 (2)	2
30	DF	ENG	Peter Hawkins	0	0	0	0	0	0	0	0
31	DF	ENG	Danny Hodges	0	0	0	0	0	0	0	0
32	GK	NOR	~~Morten Bakke *~~ †	0	0	0	0	0	0	0	0
33	GK	IRL	Brendan Murphy	0	0	0	0	0	0	0	0
34	GK	ENG	~~Brian Parkin~~ †	0	0	0	0	0	0	0	0
35	FW	ENG	Patrick Agyemang	0	0	0	0	0	0	0	0
