= 1997–98 Wimbledon F.C. season =

Wimbledon F.C.
1997–98 season
- Chairman: Sam Hammam
- Manager: Joe Kinnear
- Stadium: Selhurst Park
- FA Premier League: 15th
- FA Cup: Fifth round
- League Cup: Third round
- Top goalscorer: League: Carl Cort/Efan Ekoku/Jason Euell/ Michael Hughes/Carl Leaburn (4); All: Jason Euell (8)
- Average home league attendance: 16,156

During the 1997–98 English football season, Wimbledon F.C. competed in the FA Premier League. They finished 15th in the final table to secure a 13th successive top flight campaign, although their final position was disappointing given their performance earlier in the season.

== Season summary ==
Despite the early season sale of Dean Holdsworth to Bolton Wanderers, Wimbledon showed the "Crazy Gang" spirit once more as they stayed clear of the relegation zone and spent most of the season in mid table. Manager Joe Kinnear was hopeful that this could finally be the season when Wimbledon achieved a UEFA Cup place, but the team's form steadily deteriorated during the second half of the season. Their 15th-place finish was their worst since reaching the top flight in 1986, though they had never looked to be in any real danger of relegation.

== Final league table ==
| Pos | Team | Pld | W | D | L | GF | GA | GD | Pts | Qualification or relegation |
|---|---|---|---|---|---|---|---|---|---|---|
| 13 | Newcastle United | 38 | 11 | 11 | 16 | 35 | 44 | −9 | 44 | Qualification for the Cup Winners' Cup first round (Note: As Arsenal qualified for the Champions League, their Cup Winners' Cup place as FA Cup winners defaulted to Newcastle United, the runners-up.) |
| 14 | Tottenham Hotspur | 38 | 11 | 11 | 16 | 44 | 56 | −12 | 44 | |
| 15 | Wimbledon | 38 | 10 | 14 | 14 | 34 | 46 | −12 | 44 | |
| 16 | Sheffield Wednesday | 38 | 12 | 8 | 18 | 52 | 67 | −15 | 44 | |
| 17 | Everton | 38 | 9 | 13 | 16 | 41 | 56 | −15 | 40 | |

Source: Premier League
Rules for classification: 1) points; 2) goal difference; 3) number of goals scored.
Notes:

Results summary

| Overall | | | | | | | | Home | | | | | | Away | | | | | |
| Pld | W | D | L | GF | GA | GD | Pts | W | D | L | GF | GA | GD | W | D | L | GF | GA | GD |
|---|---|---|---|---|---|---|---|---|---|---|---|---|---|---|---|---|---|---|---|
| 38 | 10 | 14 | 14 | 34 | 46 | −12 | 44 | 5 | 6 | 8 | 18 | 25 | −7 | 5 | 8 | 6 | 16 | 21 | −5 |

Source: 1997-98 FA Premier League table

Results by round

| Round | 1 | 2 | 3 | 4 | 5 | 6 | 7 | 8 | 9 | 10 | 11 | 12 | 13 | 14 | 15 | 16 | 17 | 18 | 19 | 20 | 21 | 22 | 23 | 24 | 25 | 26 | 27 | 28 | 29 | 30 | 31 | 32 | 33 | 34 | 35 | 36 | 37 | 38 |
|---|---|---|---|---|---|---|---|---|---|---|---|---|---|---|---|---|---|---|---|---|---|---|---|---|---|---|---|---|---|---|---|---|---|---|---|---|---|---|
| Ground | H | H | H | A | A | H | H | A | H | A | A | H | H | A | H | A | H | A | A | H | A | H | A | A | H | A | H | H | A | H | H | A | H | A | A | A | H | A |
| Result | D | D | L | L | W | L | W | D | L | W | D | W | L | W | L | L | W | D | D | L | L | D | D | W | W | L | L | W | L | D | D | W | D | L | D | D | L | D |
| Position | 11 | 14 | 17 | 20 | 15 | 18 | 13 | 15 | 15 | 12 | 11 | 9 | 10 | 9 | 10 | 11 | 10 | 11 | 12 | 12 | 14 | 14 | 16 | 15 | 13 | 15 | 15 | 14 | 14 | 14 | 14 | 13 | 13 | 13 | 14 | 14 | 16 | 15 |

Source: Soccerbase: 1997–98 Wimbledon results
A = Away; H = Home; W = Win; D = Draw; L = Loss

== Results ==
Wimbledon's score comes first

=== Legend ===
| Win | Draw | Loss |

=== FA Premier League ===
| Date | Opponent | Venue | Result | Attendance | Scorers |
|---|---|---|---|---|---|
| 9 August 1997 | Liverpool | H | 1–1 | 26,106 | Gayle |
| 23 August 1997 | Sheffield Wednesday | H | 1–1 | 11,503 | Euell |
| 27 August 1997 | Chelsea | H | 0–2 | 22,237 | |
| 30 August 1997 | West Ham United | A | 1–3 | 24,516 | Ekoku |
| 13 September 1997 | Newcastle United | A | 3–1 | 36,526 | Cort, Perry, Ekoku |
| 20 September 1997 | Crystal Palace | H | 0–1 | 16,747 | |
| 23 September 1997 | Barnsley | H | 4–1 | 7,668 | Cort, Earle, C Hughes, Ekoku |
| 27 September 1997 | Tottenham Hotspur | A | 0–0 | 26,261 | |
| 4 October 1997 | Blackburn Rovers | H | 0–1 | 15,600 | |
| 18 October 1997 | Aston Villa | A | 2–1 | 32,087 | Earle, Cort |
| 22 October 1997 | Derby County | A | 1–1 | 28,595 | Rowett (own goal) |
| 25 October 1997 | Leeds United | H | 1–0 | 15,718 | Ardley (pen) |
| 1 November 1997 | Coventry City | H | 1–2 | 11,201 | Cort |
| 10 November 1997 | Leicester City | A | 1–0 | 18,553 | Gayle |
| 22 November 1997 | Manchester United | H | 2–5 | 26,309 | Ardley, M Hughes |
| 29 November 1997 | Bolton Wanderers | A | 0–1 | 22,703 | |
| 7 December 1997 | Southampton | H | 1–0 | 12,009 | Earle |
| 13 December 1997 | Everton | A | 0–0 | 28,533 | |
| 26 December 1997 | Chelsea | A | 1–1 | 34,100 | M Hughes |
| 28 December 1997 | West Ham United | H | 1–2 | 22,087 | Solbakken |
| 10 January 1998 | Liverpool | A | 0–2 | 38,011 | |
| 17 January 1998 | Derby County | H | 0–0 | 13,031 | |
| 31 January 1998 | Sheffield Wednesday | A | 1–1 | 22,655 | M Hughes |
| 9 February 1998 | Crystal Palace | A | 3–0 | 14,410 | Leaburn (2), Euell |
| 21 February 1998 | Aston Villa | H | 2–1 | 13,131 | Euell, Leaburn |
| 28 February 1998 | Barnsley | A | 1–2 | 17,102 | Euell |
| 11 March 1998 | Arsenal | H | 0–1 | 22,291 | |
| 14 March 1998 | Leicester City | H | 2–1 | 13,229 | Roberts, M Hughes |
| 28 March 1998 | Manchester United | A | 0–2 | 55,306 | |
| 31 March 1998 | Newcastle United | H | 0–0 | 15,478 | |
| 4 April 1998 | Bolton Wanderers | H | 0–0 | 11,356 | |
| 11 April 1998 | Southampton | A | 1–0 | 14,815 | Leaburn |
| 13 April 1998 | Everton | H | 0–0 | 15,131 | |
| 18 April 1998 | Arsenal | A | 0–5 | 38,024 | |
| 25 April 1998 | Blackburn Rovers | A | 0–0 | 24,848 | |
| 29 April 1998 | Coventry City | A | 0–0 | 17,968 | |
| 2 May 1998 | Tottenham Hotspur | H | 2–6 | 25,820 | Fear (2) |
| 10 May 1998 | Leeds United | A | 1–1 | 38,172 | Ekoku |

=== FA Cup ===
| Round | Date | Opponent | Venue | Result | Attendance | Goalscorers |
|---|---|---|---|---|---|---|
| R3 | 4 January 1998 | Wrexham | H | 0–0 | 6,349 | |
| R3R | 13 January 1998 | Wrexham | A | 3–2 | 9,539 | Hughes (2), Gayle |
| R4 | 24 January 1998 | Huddersfield Town | A | 1–0 | 14,533 | Ardley |
| R5 | 14 February 1998 | Wolverhampton Wanderers | H | 1–1 | 15,322 | Euell |
| R5R | 25 February 1998 | Wolverhampton Wanderers | A | 1–2 | 25,112 | Jones |

=== League Cup ===
| Round | Date | Opponent | Venue | Result | Attendance | Goalscorers |
|---|---|---|---|---|---|---|
| R2 1st Leg | 16 September 1997 | Millwall | H | 5–1 | 6,949 | Cort (2, 1 pen), Clarke, Euell, Castledine |
| R2 2nd Leg | 1 October 1997 | Millwall | A | 4–1 (won 9–2 on agg) | 3,591 | Euell (2), Castledine, Gayle |
| R3 | 14 October 1997 | Bolton Wanderers | A | 0–2 | 9,875 | |

== Players ==
=== First-team squad ===
Squad at end of season

Note: Flags indicate national team as defined under FIFA eligibility rules; some limited exceptions apply. Players may hold more than one non-FIFA nationality.

| No. | Pos. | Nation | Player |
|---|---|---|---|
| 1 | GK | SCO | Neil Sullivan (Note: Sullivan was born in Sutton, England, but also qualified to represent Scotland internationally and made his international debut for Scotland in 1997.) |
| 2 | DF | IRL | Kenny Cunningham |
| 3 | DF | ENG | Alan Kimble |
| 5 | DF | ENG | Dean Blackwell |
| 6 | DF | ENG | Ben Thatcher (Note: Thatcher was born in Swindon, England and represented them at U-21 level, but also qualified to represent Wales internationally through his grandmother and made his international debut for Wales in March 2004.) |
| 7 | MF | WAL | Ceri Hughes |
| 8 | MF | JAM | Robbie Earle (captain) (Note: Earle was born in Newcastle-under-Lyme, England, and was called up for England without playing, but also qualified to represent Jamaica internationally and made his international debut for Jamaica in 1997.) |
| 9 | FW | NGA | Efan Ekoku (Note: Ekoku was born in Cheetham, England, but also qualified to represent Nigeria internationally and made his international debut for Nigeria in 1994.) |
| 10 | MF | ENG | Andy Roberts |
| 11 | FW | JAM | Marcus Gayle (Note: Gayle was born in Hammersmith, London, and represented them at U-18 level, but also qualified to represent Jamaica internationally through his father and made his international debut for Jamaica in 1998.) |
| 12 | DF | ENG | Chris Perry |
| 13 | GK | ENG | Paul Heald |
| 14 | FW | IRL | Jon Goodman (Note: Goodman was born in Waltham Forest, England, but also qualified to represent the Republic of Ireland internationally and made his debut for the Republic of Ireland in 1997.) |
| 15 | DF | ENG | Alan Reeves |

| No. | Pos. | Nation | Player |
|---|---|---|---|
| 16 | MF | NIR | Michael Hughes |
| 17 | DF | SCO | Brian McAllister |
| 18 | MF | ENG | Neal Ardley |
| 19 | MF | ENG | Stewart Castledine |
| 20 | FW | ENG | Mick Harford |
| 21 | DF | SCO | Duncan Jupp (Note: Jupp was born in Haslemere, England, but also qualified to represent Scotland internationally and represented them at U-21 level.) |
| 22 | FW | ENG | Andy Clarke |
| 23 | FW | ENG | Jason Euell (Note: Euell was born in Lambeth, England, and represented them at U-21 level, but also qualified to represent Jamaica internationally through his father and would make his international debut for Jamaica in November 2004.) |
| 24 | MF | ENG | Peter Fear |
| 26 | FW | ENG | Carl Cort (Note: Cort was born in Southwark, England, but also qualified to represent Guyana internationally and would make his international debut for Guyana in 2011.) |
| 27 | MF | ENG | Damien Francis (Note: Francis was born in Wandsworth, England, but also qualified to represent Jamaica internationally and would make his international debut for Jamaica in 2003.) |
| 29 | FW | ENG | Carl Leaburn |
| 30 | DF | ENG | Peter Hawkins |
| 32 | DF | IRL | Mark Kennedy |

=== Left club during season ===
Note: Flags indicate national team as defined under FIFA eligibility rules; some limited exceptions apply. Players may hold more than one non-FIFA nationality.

| No. | Pos. | Nation | Player |
|---|---|---|---|
| 4 | MF | WAL | Vinnie Jones (Note: Jones was born in Watford, England, but also qualified to represent Wales through his maternal grandfather and made his international debut for Wales in December 1994.) (to Queens Park Rangers) |
| 10 | FW | ENG | Dean Holdsworth (to Bolton Wanderers) |

| No. | Pos. | Nation | Player |
|---|---|---|---|
| 10 | MF | NOR | Ståle Solbakken (to Aalborg) |

=== Reserve squad ===
Note: Flags indicate national team as defined under FIFA eligibility rules; some limited exceptions apply. Players may hold more than one non-FIFA nationality.

| No. | Pos. | Nation | Player |
|---|---|---|---|
| 25 | DF | ENG | Andy Pearce |
| 28 | FW | ENG | Richard O'Connor (Note: O'Connor was born in Wandsworth, England, but also qualified to represent Anguilla internationally and would make his international debut for Anguilla in 2000.) |

| No. | Pos. | Nation | Player |
|---|---|---|---|
| 31 | DF | ENG | Danny Hodges |
| 33 | GK | IRL | Brendan Murphy |

== Transfers ==
=== In ===
| Date | Pos | Name | From | Fee |
|---|---|---|---|---|
| 2 July 1997 | MF | Ceri Hughes | Luton Town | £400,000 |
| 25 September 1997 | MF | Michael Hughes | West Ham United | £1,600,000 |
| 13 October 1997 | MF | Ståle Solbakken | Lillestrøm | £250,000 |
| 8 January 1998 | FW | Carl Leaburn | Charlton Athletic | £300,000 |
| 9 March 1998 | MF | Andy Roberts | Crystal Palace | £2,000,000 |
| 26 March 1998 | MF | Mark Kennedy | Liverpool | £1,750,000 |

=== Out ===
| Date | Pos | Name | To | Fee |
|---|---|---|---|---|
| 2 June 1997 | MF | Øyvind Leonhardsen | Liverpool | £3,500,000 |
| 1 August 1997 | DF | Scott Fitzgerald | Millwall | £50,000 |
| 2 October 1997 | FW | Dean Holdsworth | Bolton Wanderers | £3,500,000 |
| 26 March 1998 | MF | Vinnie Jones | Queens Park Rangers | £750,000 |

Transfers in: ▼£6,300,000
Transfers out: ▲£7,800,000
Total spending: ▲£1,500,000

== Statistics ==
=== Appearances and goals ===
| No. | Pos | Nat | Player | Total | | FA Premier League | | FA Cup | | League Cup | |
| No. | Pos | Nat | Player | Apps | Goals | Apps | Goals | Apps | Goals | Apps | Goals |
Goalkeepers
| 1 | GK | (Scotland) SCO | Neil Sullivan | 44 | 0 | 38 | 0 | 5 | 0 | 1 | 0 |
| 13 | GK | (England) ENG | Paul Heald | 2 | 0 | 0 | 0 | 0 | 0 | 2 | 0 |
Defenders
| 2 | DF | (Republic of Ireland) IRL | Kenny Cunningham | 39 | 0 | 33 | 0 | 3 | 0 | 3 | 0 |
| 3 | DF | (England) ENG | Alan Kimble | 30 | 0 | 24+2 | 0 | 3 | 0 | 0+1 | 0 |
| 5 | DF | (England) ENG | Dean Blackwell | 40 | 0 | 36 | 0 | 4 | 0 | 0 | 0 |
| 6 | DF | (England) ENG | Ben Thatcher | 32 | 0 | 23+3 | 0 | 3 | 0 | 3 | 0 |
| 12 | DF | (England) ENG | Chris Perry | 44 | 1 | 36 | 1 | 5 | 0 | 3 | 0 |
| 15 | DF | (England) ENG | Alan Reeves | 1 | 0 | 0 | 0 | 0 | 0 | 0+1 | 0 |
| 17 | DF | (Scotland) SCO | Brian McAllister | 10 | 0 | 4+3 | 0 | 0 | 0 | 3 | 0 |
| 21 | DF | (Scotland) SCO | Duncan Jupp | 6 | 0 | 3 | 0 | 2 | 0 | 1 | 0 |
Midfielders
| 7 | MF | (Wales) WAL | Ceri Hughes | 22 | 1 | 14+4 | 1 | 2 | 0 | 2 | 0 |
| 8 | MF | (Jamaica) JAM | Robbie Earle | 26 | 3 | 21+1 | 3 | 3 | 0 | 1 | 0 |
| 10 | MF | (England) ENG | Andy Roberts | 12 | 1 | 12 | 1 | 0 | 0 | 0 | 0 |
| 16 | MF | (Northern Ireland) NIR | Michael Hughes | 33 | 6 | 29 | 4 | 4 | 2 | 0 | 0 |
| 18 | MF | (England) ENG | Neal Ardley | 39 | 3 | 32+2 | 2 | 5 | 1 | 0 | 0 |
| 19 | MF | (England) ENG | Stewart Castledine | 12 | 2 | 3+3 | 0 | 1+2 | 0 | 3 | 2 |
| 24 | MF | (England) ENG | Peter Fear | 11 | 2 | 5+3 | 2 | 2 | 0 | 1 | 0 |
| 27 | MF | (England) ENG | Damien Francis | 5 | 0 | 0+2 | 0 | 2 | 0 | 1 | 0 |
| 32 | MF | (Republic of Ireland) IRL | Mark Kennedy | 4 | 0 | 4 | 0 | 0 | 0 | 0 | 0 |
Forwards
| 9 | FW | (Nigeria) NGA | Efan Ekoku | 20 | 4 | 12+5 | 4 | 0+1 | 0 | 1+1 | 0 |
| 11 | FW | (England) ENG | Marcus Gayle | 38 | 4 | 22+9 | 2 | 3+1 | 1 | 2+1 | 1 |
| 22 | FW | (England) ENG | Andy Clarke | 20 | 1 | 1+12 | 0 | 0+4 | 0 | 2+1 | 1 |
| 23 | FW | (England) ENG | Jason Euell | 23 | 8 | 14+4 | 4 | 2 | 1 | 3 | 3 |
| 26 | FW | (England) ENG | Carl Cort | 29 | 6 | 16+6 | 4 | 4+1 | 0 | 1+1 | 2 |
| 29 | FW | (England) ENG | Carl Leaburn | 16 | 4 | 15+1 | 4 | 0 | 0 | 0 | 0 |
Players who left the club during the season
| 4 | MF | (Wales) WAL | Vinnie Jones | 31 | 1 | 23+2 | 0 | 3+1 | 1 | 1+1 | 0 |
| 10 | FW | (England) ENG | Dean Holdsworth | 6 | 0 | 4+1 | 0 | 0 | 0 | 0+1 | 0 |
| 10 | MF | (Norway) NOR | Ståle Solbakken | 8 | 1 | 4+2 | 1 | 1+1 | 0 | 0 | 0 |
