= 1996–97 Wimbledon F.C. season =

Wimbledon
1996–97 season
- Chairman: Sam Hammam
- Manager: Joe Kinnear
- Stadium: Selhurst Park
- Premier League: 8th
- FA Cup: Semi-finals
- League Cup: Semi-finals
- Top goalscorer: League: Ekoku (11); All: Gayle (13)
- Highest home attendance: 25,786 (vs. Manchester United, 17 August)
- Lowest home attendance: 3,811 (vs. Portsmouth, 18 September)
- Average home league attendance: 14,416

During the 1996–97 English football season, Wimbledon competed in the Premier League. The season marked 20 years since Wimbledon's election to the Football League and was their eleventh successive season of top division football. It was one of the most successful of the club's history as they finished eighth in the Premier League and reached the semi-finals of both domestic cups.

== Season summary ==
The opening day of the season saw Wimbledon lose 3–0 at home to Manchester United in a game mostly remembered for David Beckham's late goal from inside his own half. The Dons also lost their next two games, but then went on a 19-match unbeaten run, including seven league wins in a row. A 1–0 over Blackburn Rovers in December left them 3rd in the table, one point behind leaders Arsenal. The team's form tailed off in the second half of the season and they missed out on the chance of European qualification, finishing 8th.

Wimbledon also reached the semi-finals of both domestic cups. Their FA Cup run saw them knock out holders Manchester United but they lost 3–0 to the eventual winners Chelsea at Highbury. In the League Cup they were eliminated on away goals by Leicester City, who also went on to win the trophy. The sale of Øyvind Leonhardsen to Liverpool at the end of the season left manager Joe Kinnear with a big hole to fill in a squad which had, so far, achieved so much on a shoestring budget.

== Final league table ==
Pos	Team	Pld	W	D	L	GF	GA	GD	Pts	Qualification or relegation
6	Chelsea	38	16	11	11	58	55	+3	59	Qualification for the Cup Winners' Cup first round (Note: Chelsea qualified for the Cup Winners' Cup as FA Cup winners.)
7	Sheffield Wednesday	38	14	15	9	50	51	−1	57	
8	Wimbledon	38	15	11	12	49	46	+3	56	
9	Leicester City	38	12	11	15	46	54	−8	47	Qualification for the UEFA Cup first round (Note: Leicester City qualified for the UEFA Cup as League Cup winners.)
10	Tottenham Hotspur	38	13	7	18	44	51	−7	46	

Source: Premier League
Rules for classification: 1) points; 2) goal difference; 3) number of goals scored.
Notes:

Results summary

Overall								Home						Away					
Pld	W	D	L	GF	GA	GD	Pts	W	D	L	GF	GA	GD	W	D	L	GF	GA	GD
38	15	11	12	49	46	+3	56	9	6	4	28	21	+7	6	5	8	21	25	−4

Source: Statto

Results by round

Round	1	2	3	4	5	6	7	8	9	10	11	12	13	14	15	16	17	18	19	20	21	22	23	24	25	26	27	28	29	30	31	32	33	34	35	36	37	38
Ground	H	A	A	H	H	A	H	A	H	A	A	H	H	A	H	A	H	A	A	H	A	A	H	A	A	H	A	A	H	H	A	H	H	A	H	A	H	H
Result	L	L	L	W	W	W	W	W	W	W	D	D	D	D	W	W	W	L	W	D	L	L	D	W	D	L	D	L	D	D	L	L	W	L	L	D	W	W
Position	19	20	20	17	11	8	6	3	5	2	3	4	4	4	4	2	3	3	4	5	5	5	6	6	5	6	6	7	8	8	8	8	7	8	8	8	8	8

Source: Statto.com
A = Away; H = Home; W = Win; D = Draw; L = Loss

== Results ==
Wimbledon's score comes first

=== Legend ===
Win	Draw	Loss

=== FA Premier League ===
Date	Opponent	Venue	Result	Attendance	Scorers
17 August 1996	Manchester United	H	0–3	25,786	
21 August 1996	Newcastle United	A	0–2	36,385	
26 August 1996	Leeds United	A	0–1	25,860	
4 September 1996	Tottenham Hotspur	H	1–0	17,506	Earle
7 September 1996	Everton	H	4–0	13,684	Ardley, Gayle, Earle, Ekoku
14 September 1996	West Ham United	A	2–0	21,294	Clarke, Ekoku
23 September 1996	Southampton	H	3–1	8,572	Gayle, Ekoku (2)
28 September 1996	Derby County	A	2–0	17,022	Earle, Gayle
12 October 1996	Sheffield Wednesday	H	4–2	10,512	Ekoku, Earle, Leonhardsen, Jones
19 October 1996	Chelsea	A	4–2	28,020	Earle, Ardley, Gayle, Ekoku
26 October 1996	Middlesbrough	A	0–0	29,758	
2 November 1996	Arsenal	H	2–2	25,521	Jones, Gayle
16 November 1996	Coventry City	H	2–2	10,307	Earle, Gayle
23 November 1996	Liverpool	A	1–1	39,027	Leonhardsen
30 November 1996	Nottingham Forest	H	1–0	12,608	Earle
7 December 1996	Sunderland	A	3–1	19,672	Ekoku (2), Holdsworth
14 December 1996	Blackburn Rovers	H	1–0	13,246	Holdsworth
22 December 1996	Aston Villa	A	0–5	28,875	
28 December 1996	Everton	A	3–1	36,733	Ekoku, Leonhardsen, Gayle
11 January 1997	Derby County	H	1–1	11,467	Gayle
18 January 1997	Leicester City	A	0–1	18,927	
29 January 1997	Manchester United	A	1–2	55,314	Perry
1 February 1997	Middlesbrough	H	1–1	15,046	Cox (own goal)
23 February 1997	Arsenal	A	1–0	37,854	Jones
26 February 1997	Southampton	A	0–0	14,418	
1 March 1997	Leicester City	H	1–3	11,487	Holdsworth
3 March 1997	Coventry City	A	1–1	15,273	Ekoku
15 March 1997	Blackburn Rovers	A	1–3	23,333	Ekoku
18 March 1997	West Ham United	H	1–1	15,771	Harford
23 March 1997	Newcastle United	H	1–1	23,175	Leonhardsen
5 April 1997	Tottenham Hotspur	A	0–1	32,654	
9 April 1997	Aston Villa	H	0–2	9,015	
16 April 1997	Leeds United	H	2–0	7,979	Holdsworth, Castledine
19 April 1997	Sheffield Wednesday	A	1–3	26,957	Goodman
22 April 1997	Chelsea	H	0–1	14,601	
3 May 1997	Nottingham Forest	A	1–1	19,865	Leonhardsen
6 May 1997	Liverpool	H	2–1	20,016	Euell, Holdsworth
11 May 1997	Sunderland	H	1–0	21,338	Euell

=== FA Cup ===
Round	Date	Opponent	Venue	Result	Attendance	Goalscorers
R3	14 January 1997	Crewe Alexandra	A	1–1	5,011	Perry
R3R	21 January 1997	Crewe Alexandra	H	2–0	4,951	Earle, Holdsworth
R4	25 January 1997	Manchester United	A	1–1	53,342	Earle
R4R	4 February 1997	Manchester United	H	1–0	25,601	Gayle
R5	15 February 1997	Queens Park Rangers	H	2–1	22,395	Gayle, Earle
QF	9 March 1997	Sheffield Wednesday	A	2–0	25,032	Earle, Holdsworth
SF	13 April 1997	Chelsea	N	0–3	32,674	

=== League Cup ===
Round	Date	Opponent	Venue	Result	Attendance	Goalscorers
R2 1st Leg	18 September 1996	Portsmouth	H	1–0	3,811	Holdsworth
R2 2nd Leg	25 September 1996	Portsmouth	A	1–1 (won 2–1 on agg)	4,006	Gayle
R3	22 October 1996	Luton Town	H	1–1	5,043	Holdsworth
R3R	12 November 1996	Luton Town	A	2–1	8,076	Castledine, Fear
R4	26 November 1996	Aston Villa	H	1–0	7,573	Gayle
QF	8 January 1997	Bolton Wanderers	A	2–0	16,968	Ekoku, Leonhardsen
SF 1st Leg	18 February 1997	Leicester City	A	0–0	16,021	
SF 2nd Leg	11 March 1997	Leicester City	H	1–1 (a.e.t.)(lost on away goals)	17,810	Gayle

== Players ==
=== First-team squad ===
Squad at end of season

Note: Flags indicate national team as defined under FIFA eligibility rules; some limited exceptions apply. Players may hold more than one non-FIFA nationality.

No.	Pos.	Nation	Player
1	GK	SCO	Neil Sullivan (Note: Sullivan was born in Sutton, England, but also qualified to represent Scotland internationally and made his international debut for Scotland in 1997.)
2	DF	IRL	Kenny Cunningham
3	DF	ENG	Alan Kimble
4	MF	WAL	Vinnie Jones (Note: Jones was born in Watford, England, but also qualified to represent Wales through his maternal grandfather and made his international debut for Wales in December 1994.)
5	DF	ENG	Dean Blackwell
6	DF	ENG	Ben Thatcher (Note: Thatcher was born in Swindon, England and represented them at U-21 level, but also qualified to represent Wales internationally through his grandmother and made his international debut for Wales in March 2004.)
7	MF	NOR	Øyvind Leonhardsen
8	MF	JAM	Robbie Earle (Note: Earle was born in Newcastle-under-Lyme, England, and was called up for England without playing, but also qualified to represent Jamaica internationally and made his international debut for Jamaica in 1997.)
9	FW	NGA	Efan Ekoku (Note: Ekoku was born in Cheetham, England, but also qualified to represent Nigeria internationally and made his international debut for Nigeria in 1994.)
10	FW	ENG	Dean Holdsworth
11	FW	ENG	Marcus Gayle (Note: Gayle was born in Hammersmith, London, and represented them at U-18 level, but also qualified to represent Jamaica internationally through his father and would make his international debut for Jamaica in 1998.)
12	DF	ENG	Chris Perry
13	GK	ENG	Paul Heald

No.	Pos.	Nation	Player
14	FW	IRL	Jon Goodman (Note: Goodman was born in Waltham Forest, England, but also qualified to represent the Republic of Ireland internationally and made his debut for the Republic of Ireland in 1997.)
15	DF	ENG	Alan Reeves
17	DF	SCO	Brian McAllister
18	MF	ENG	Neal Ardley
19	MF	ENG	Stewart Castledine
20	FW	ENG	Mick Harford
21	DF	SCO	Duncan Jupp (Note: Jupp was born in Haslemere, England, but also qualified to represent Scotland internationally and represented them at U-21 level.)
22	FW	ENG	Andy Clarke
23	FW	ENG	Jason Euell (Note: Euell was born in Lambeth, England, and represented them at U-21 level, but also qualified to represent Jamaica internationally through his father and would make his international debut for Jamaica in November 2004.)
24	MF	ENG	Peter Fear
25	DF	ENG	Andy Pearce
26	FW	ENG	Carl Cort (Note: Cort was born in Southwark, England, but also qualified to represent Guyana internationally and would make his international debut for Guyana in 2011.)
33	GK	IRL	Brendan Murphy

=== Left club during season ===
Note: Flags indicate national team as defined under FIFA eligibility rules; some limited exceptions apply. Players may hold more than one non-FIFA nationality.

No.	Pos.	Nation	Player
16	DF	ENG	Andy Thorn (to Hearts)

=== Reserve squad ===
The following players did not appear for the first-team this season.

Note: Flags indicate national team as defined under FIFA eligibility rules; some limited exceptions apply. Players may hold more than one non-FIFA nationality.

No.	Pos.	Nation	Player
—	FW	ENG	Gary Blissett

== Transfers ==
=== In ===
Date	Pos.	Name	From	Fee
1 July 1996	DF	Duncan Jupp	Fulham	£200,000
5 July 1996	DF	Ben Thatcher	Millwall	£1,700,000

=== Out ===
Date	Pos.	Name	To	Fee
22 July 1996	MF	Lenny Piper	Gillingham	£40,000
25 July 1996	MF	Steve Talboys	Watford	Free transfer
16 September 1996	DF	Andy Thorn	Hearts	Non-contract
18 September 1996	DF	Gary Elkins	Swindon Town	£100,000

Transfers in: ▼£1,900,000
Transfers out: ▲£140,000
Total spending: ▼£1,760,000

== Statistics ==
=== Appearances and goals ===
No.	Pos	Nat	Player	Total		Premier League		FA Cup		League Cup	
No.	Pos	Nat	Player	Apps	Goals	Apps	Goals	Apps	Goals	Apps	Goals
Goalkeepers
1	GK	(Scotland) SCO	Neil Sullivan	50	0	36	0	7	0	7	0
13	GK	(England) ENG	Paul Heald	4	0	2+1	0	0	0	1	0
Defenders
2	DF	(Republic of Ireland) IRL	Kenny Cunningham	50	0	36	0	7	0	7	0
3	DF	(England) ENG	Alan Kimble	45	0	28+3	0	6	0	8	0
5	DF	(England) ENG	Dean Blackwell	41	0	22+5	0	6	0	8	0
6	DF	(England) ENG	Ben Thatcher	9	0	9	0	0	0	0	0
12	DF	(England) ENG	Chris Perry	51	2	37	1	7	1	7	0
15	DF	(England) ENG	Alan Reeves	4	0	0+2	0	0	0	1+1	0
17	DF	(Scotland) SCO	Brian McAllister	29	0	19+4	0	2+3	0	0+1	0
21	DF	(Scotland) SCO	Duncan Jupp	9	0	6	0	0+2	0	1	0
Midfielders
4	MF	(Wales) WAL	Vinnie Jones	43	3	29	3	7	0	7	0
7	MF	(Norway) NOR	Øyvind Leonhardsen	41	6	27	5	7	0	6+1	1
8	MF	(Jamaica) JAM	Robbie Earle	45	11	32	7	7	4	6	0
18	MF	(England) ENG	Neal Ardley	43	2	33	2	5	0	4+1	0
19	MF	(England) ENG	Stewart Castledine	7	2	4+2	1	0	0	1	1
24	MF	(England) ENG	Peter Fear	21	1	9+8	0	0	0	4	1
Forwards
9	FW	(Nigeria) NGA	Efan Ekoku	41	12	28+2	11	6	0	5	1
10	FW	(England) ENG	Dean Holdsworth	36	9	10+15	5	3+3	2	4+1	2
11	FW	(England) ENG	Marcus Gayle	49	13	34+2	8	6	2	7	3
14	FW	(Republic of Ireland) IRL	Jon Goodman	17	1	6+7	1	0+3	0	1	0
20	FW	(England) ENG	Mick Harford	19	1	3+9	1	0+2	0	0+5	0
22	FW	(England) ENG	Andy Clarke	18	1	4+7	1	1	0	2+4	0
23	FW	(England) ENG	Jason Euell	8	2	4+3	2	0	0	1	0
26	FW	(England) ENG	Carl Cort	1	0	0+1	0	0	0	0	0
Players who left the club during the season
