= Okiki =

Òkìkí
- Gender: Unisex
- Language: Yoruba

Origin
- Origin: Yoruba
- Derivation: Òkìkíọlá, Òkìkíolú
- Meaning: "herald of wealth", or "herald of success"
- Region of origin: South West, Nigeria

Òkìkí audio is a unisex name of Yoruba origin, commonly used in South West, Nigeria, and translates to "herald of wealth" or "herald of success". It is a shortened form of names such as Òkìkíọlá, or Òkìkíolú. It is derived from two Yoruba words: Òkìkí, meaning "fame" or "prestige," and ọlá, meaning "wealth." The name is often associated with prosperity, good fortune, and blessings in Yoruba culture and is used for both males and females. Okiki carries a cultural connotation tied to the gods of wealth and prosperity, reflecting a wish for the bearer to experience prestige and affluence.

== People with the given name ==
- Okiki Afolabi (born 1994) Nigerian professional footballer
- Samuel Kola Okikiolu (born 1982) English former professional footballer
