= Justin Skinner =

Justin Skinner may refer to:

- Justin Skinner (footballer, born 1969), English footballer, played for Fulham, Bristol Rovers and Dunfermline Athletic
- Justin Skinner (footballer, born 1972), English footballer, played for Wimbledon in the Premier League
