= Ben Thatcher =

Wales international footballer (born 1975)

Personal information
- Full name: Benjamin David Thatcher
- Date of birth: 30 November 1975 (age 50)
- Place of birth: Swindon, England
- Height: 5 ft 10 in (1.78 m)
- Position: Left back

Youth career
- ?–1992: Millwall

Senior career*
Years	Team	Apps	(Gls)
1992–1996	Millwall	90	(1)
1996–2000	Wimbledon	86	(0)
2000–2003	Tottenham Hotspur	36	(0)
2003–2004	Leicester City	29	(1)
2004–2007	Manchester City	47	(0)
2007–2008	Charlton Athletic	22	(0)
2008–2010	Ipswich Town	20	(0)
Total		330	(2)

International career
1995–1997	England U21	4	(0)
2004	Wales	7	(0)
- * Club domestic league appearances and goals

Benjamin David Thatcher (born 30 November 1975) is a former professional footballer who played as a left-back.

He played for a number of English clubs, and has featured in more than 300 English league games, all of which were in the top two leagues in the country, notably spending time in the Premier League with Wimbledon, Tottenham Hotspur, Leicester City and Manchester City. He also played for Millwall, Charlton Athletic and Ipswich Town. He represented England's under-21 national team on four occasions, but chose to represent the senior Wales national team, for whom he earned seven caps.

== Club career ==
Thatcher was born in Swindon, Wiltshire. As a youth, he played Sunday League football for various amateur teams in London, before attending the Football Association (FA)'s School of Excellence at Lilleshall.

=== Millwall ===
Upon graduation, he signed his first professional contract with Millwall, making his debut in the 1993–94 season at the age of 18. The following season, he established himself in the Millwall first team, and scored his first goal as a professional. He made more than 100 appearances for Millwall, and won their Player of the Year award for the 1995–96 season.

=== Wimbledon ===
In the 1996 close season, he was transferred to Wimbledon F.C. for a fee of more than £1.8million - making him Wimbledon's first million-pound signing and doubling the club's previous record fee which had been paid for Efan Ekoku three years earlier.

In his first season at Wimbledon, Thatcher made only nine appearances, but played more regularly in subsequent seasons. He was banned for two matches in January 2000 for elbowing Nicky Summerbee of Sunderland to the head in the build-up to a goal; the incident was missed by the referee but action was taken by the governing body following a video review. After Wimbledon's relegation from the Premiership at the end of the 1999–2000 season, Thatcher moved to Tottenham Hotspur.

=== Tottenham Hotspur ===
Thatcher cost Tottenham Hotspur a fee of around £5 million in the Summer of 2000. A few months after the transfer, Spurs manager George Graham was sacked, and Thatcher featured less frequently under successor Glenn Hoddle, though he was a member of the Spurs team for the 2002 League Cup final.

=== Leicester City ===
Thatcher subsequently moved to Leicester City in a £300,000 transfer deal in the summer 2003, immediately proceeding to attack Glenn Hoddle's style of management.

After a single season at Leicester, Thatcher once again found himself in the arms of a relegated club, and moved to Manchester City. He scored once in the league for Leicester, in a 4–4 draw with his former club Spurs.

=== Manchester City ===
His move to Manchester City cost around £100,000. His Manchester City debut came on the opening day of the 2004–05 season against Fulham. He was initially the first choice left-back at Manchester City, but a combination of injuries and the emergence of Stephen Jordan limited him to 21 appearances in his first season for the club. In January 2005 Thatcher nearly joined Fulham for a fee of £500,000 after a series of burglaries unsettled his family, but the move fell through. His second Manchester City season followed a similar pattern to the first, with most of his 19 starts coming in the first half of the season.

Thatcher gained notoriety on 23 August 2006, in a game between Manchester City and Portsmouth. Whilst challenging with Pedro Mendes for a loose ball Thatcher led with his elbow, knocking Mendes into the advertising hoardings and rendering him unconscious. Mendes required oxygen at pitchside and suffered a seizure while being transferred to hospital, where he spent the night. Mendes was discharged from hospital the next day, but remained under medical supervision. Thatcher was not sent off by referee Dermot Gallagher but given just a yellow card, but he was investigated by the FA as a result of the challenge. He was disciplined and his barrister, Rupert Bowers KC, read a written apology following the hearing. Greater Manchester Police noted receipt of many "statements of complaint" and also chose to investigate the matter. On 30 August, Manchester City announced that Thatcher would be banned for six matches, two of which would be suspended, and fined six weeks' wages for the challenge. This punishment was separate from the sanctions made by the FA, who suspended Thatcher for eight matches, with a further fifteen-game suspended ban for two years. Mendes shook hands with Thatcher pre-match when they next faced one another in January 2007, despite claiming beforehand that he would not do so.

Thatcher also faced possible action from Lancashire Police over a clash with ex-Blackburn Rovers player Ralph Welch during a reserve game at Ewood Park in February 2006.

=== Charlton Athletic ===
He signed for Charlton Athletic on 11 January 2007 for a reported fee of £500,000, which could rise to £750,000 depending on appearances. He played his first match for Charlton Athletic on 23 January 2007 against Middlesbrough; the team were relegated from the Premier League at the end of the season.

=== Ipswich Town ===
Thatcher joined Ipswich Town on 14 August 2008 on a one-year contract with an option to extend it for a further year. His contract was terminated by Roy Keane on 26 February 2010, due to his refusal to move closer to the club.

== International career ==
During his time at Wimbledon, Thatcher played for the England under-21 team four times. However, in 2004 he opted to play for Wales, for whom he qualifies due to his Welsh grandmother. His debut international performance came against Hungary, in a 2–1 victory in March 2004, and by October 2004 he had earned seven caps for Wales.

In October 2004, John Toshack was appointed new Welsh national team coach, but Thatcher did not play any games under Toshack, due to suspensions and injuries. Thatcher did not play Wales' 2006 FIFA World Cup qualifying matches against England and Poland in early September 2005 on grounds of injury, while playing full-time three days later when Manchester City met cross-city rivals Manchester United. This angered Toshack, and Thatcher was categorically left out of the Welsh national team in September 2005.

== Career statistics ==
=== Club ===
Appearances and goals by club, season and competition
Club	Season	League			FA Cup		League Cup		Other		Total	
Club	Season	Division	App	Goals	App	Goals	App	Goals	App	Goals	App	Goals
Millwall	1993–94	First Division	8	0	1	0	0	0	1 (Note: Appearance in Anglo-Italian Cup)	0	10	0
Millwall	1994–95	First Division	40	1	4	0	4	0	—		48	1
Millwall	1995–96	First Division	42	0	2	0	2	0	—		46	0
Millwall	Total		90	1	7	0	6	0	1	0	104	1
Wimbledon	1996–97	Premier League	9	0	0	0	0	0	—		9	0
Wimbledon	1997–98	Premier League	26	0	3	0	3	0	—		32	0
Wimbledon	1998–99	Premier League	31	0	2	0	7	0	—		40	0
Wimbledon	1999–2000	Premier League	20	0	0	0	2	0	—		22	0
Wimbledon	Total		86	0	5	0	12	0	0	0	103	0
Tottenham Hotspur	2000–01	Premier League	12	0	0	0	3	0	—		15	0
Tottenham Hotspur	2001–02	Premier League	12	0	2	0	3	0	—		17	0
Tottenham Hotspur	2002–03	Premier League	12	0	1	0	1	0	—		14	0
Tottenham Hotspur	Total		36	0	3	0	7	0	0	0	46	0
Leicester City	2003–04	Premier League	29	1	0	0	0	0	—		29	1
Manchester City	2004–05	Premier League	18	0	1	0	2	0	—		21	0
Manchester City	2005–06	Premier League	18	0	0	0	1	0	—		19	0
Manchester City	2006–07	Premier League	11	0	0	0	0	0	—		11	0
Manchester City	Total		47	0	1	0	3	0	0	0	51	0
Charlton Athletic	2006–07	Premier League	11	0	0	0	0	0	—		11	0
Charlton Athletic	2007–08	Championship	11	0	0	0	0	0	—		11	0
Charlton Athletic	Total		22	0	0	0	0	0	0	0	22	0
Ipswich Town	2008–09	Championship	20	0	1	0	2	0	—		23	0
Ipswich Town	2009–10	Championship	0	0	0	0	0	0	—		0	0
Ipswich Town	Total		20	0	1	0	2	0	0	0	23	0
Career total			330	2	17	0	30	0	1	0	378	2

=== International ===
Appearances and goals by national team and year
National team	Year	Apps	Goals
Wales	2004	7	0
Total		7	0

== Honours ==
Tottenham Hotspur

- Football League Cup runner-up: 2001–02

Individual

- PFA Team of the Year: 1994–95 First Division
- Millwall Player of the Year: 1995–96
