= Chris Perry (English footballer) =

English footballer and coach (born 1973)

Personal information
- Full name: Christopher John Perry
- Date of birth: 26 April 1973 (age 53)
- Place of birth: Carshalton, England
- Height: 5 ft 9 in (1.75 m)
- Position: Defender

Youth career
- ?–1991: Wimbledon

Senior career*
Years	Team	Apps	(Gls)
1991–1999	Wimbledon	167	(2)
1999–2003	Tottenham Hotspur	120	(3)
2003	→ Charlton Athletic (loan)	8	(0)
2003–2006	Charlton Athletic	68	(3)
2006–2007	West Bromwich Albion	23	(0)
2007–2008	Luton Town	35	(1)
2008	→ Southampton (loan)	6	(0)
2008–2010	Southampton	52	(2)
Total		479	(11)
- * Club domestic league appearances and goals

Christopher John Perry (born 26 April 1973) is an English football coach, former footballer and pundit.

As a player, he was a defender who notably played in the Premier League for Wimbledon, Tottenham Hotspur and Charlton Athletic, as well as in the Football League for West Bromwich Albion, Luton Town and Southampton.

Following retirement, Perry became a youth team coach with Dagenham & Redbridge before coming a pundit for Talksport and BT Sport.

== Football career ==
Perry started his career with Wimbledon, the team he supported as a boy, and grew up within walking distance of the club's ground at Plough Lane. He debuted in the early 1990s and went on to make over 200 appearances for the club. Such was his form, he was tipped by Manchester United manager Alex Ferguson and Crazy Gang boss Joe Kinnear to play for England.

Perry moved from South to North London in July 1999, joining Tottenham Hotspur for a fee of £4 million. When teammate Sol Campbell moved to Arsenal, Perry became a first choice member of the team from the 2001–02 season, until he lost his place in the team in January 2003, after incurring a slipped disk. Three months later and upon his return he found himself amongst emerging youth players Ledley King and Anthony Gardner, and joined Charlton Athletic on loan in September 2003.

Having impressed, his move was made permanent by Alan Curbishley in November 2003, after a £100,000 fee was agreed. Charlton were sitting in fourth place in the league at the time. He subsequently featured frequently in the league in the following two seasons and became an important part of the squad. When Iain Dowie replaced Curbishley as manager in May 2006, Perry was released from the club.

He moved to West Bromwich Albion in July 2006, and made his debut a month later in a 2–0 win over Hull City. He helped the club reach the play-off final in the 2006–07 season. Perry criticised Derby County, who beat Albion in the final, predicting "they will come straight back down" from the Premier League. After being released by West Brom, having failed to make an agreed number of appearances to earn a new contract, Perry joined League One team Luton Town in July 2007.

Perry scored his first goal for Luton in a 2–1 home win over Nottingham Forest on 27 October 2007. His performance in the match earned him a place in the League One Team of the Week.

On 27 March 2008 he joined Southampton on loan for the rest of the season as a replacement for Andrew Davies, who broke his cheekbone and was ruled out for the remainder of the season. He was expected to go straight into the squad and make his debut against Cardiff City on 29 March. His performance in the 2–0 home win against Bristol City on 5 April 2008 saw him named in the Championship Team of the Week. On 6 June 2008 he joined Southampton on a free transfer. He scored his first goal for the club in the 2–1 home defeat to Birmingham City in August 2008.

On 15 May 2010, Perry was named in a list of 13 players to be released from Southampton before the start of the 2010–11 season.

== Coaching career ==
Perry became a youth team coach with Dagenham & Redbridge, working with their under-16's. In 2015, he began working with the youth teams at Millwall.

== Personal life ==
In 2011, he ran the London Marathon to raise money for motor neurone disease charities following the loss of his mother when he was 18 years old.

== Career statistics ==
Source: Chris Perry at the English National Football Archive (subscription required)

Appearances and goals by club, season and competition
Club	Season	League			FA Cup		League Cup		Other		Total	
Club	Season	Division	Apps	Goals	Apps	Goals	Apps	Goals	Apps	Goals	Apps	Goals
Wimbledon	1993–94	Premier League	2	0	0	0	0	0	—		2	0
Wimbledon	1994–95	Premier League	22	0	3	0	2	0	—		27	0
Wimbledon	1995–96	Premier League	37	0	7	0	2	0	0	0	46	0
Wimbledon	1996–97	Premier League	37	1	7	1	7	0	—		51	2
Wimbledon	1997–98	Premier League	35	1	5	0	3	0	—		43	1
Wimbledon	1998–99	Premier League	34	0	2	0	7	0	—		43	0
Wimbledon	Total		167	2	24	1	21	0	0	0	212	3
Tottenham Hotspur	1999–2000	Premier League	37	1	2	0	2	0	4 (Note: Appearances in UEFA Cup)	1	45	2
Tottenham Hotspur	2000–01	Premier League	32	1	4	0	3	0	—		39	1
Tottenham Hotspur	2001–02	Premier League	33	0	2	0	7	0	—		42	0
Tottenham Hotspur	2002–03	Premier League	18	1	1	0	1	0	—		20	1
Tottenham Hotspur	Total		120	3	9	0	13	0	4	1	146	4
Charlton Athletic	2003–04	Premier League	29	1	1	0	1	0	—		31	1
Charlton Athletic	2004–05	Premier League	19	1	0	0	2	0	—		21	1
Charlton Athletic	2005–06	Premier League	28	1	4	0	0	0	—		32	1
Charlton Athletic	Total		76	3	5	0	3	0	—		84	3
West Bromwich Albion	2006–07	Championship	23	0	0	0	1	0	3 (Note: Appearances in Championship play-offs)	0	27	0
Luton Town	2007–08	League One	35	1	4	0	3	0	2 (Note: Appearances in Football League Trophy)	0	44	1
Southampton	2007–08	Championship	6	0	—		—		—		6	0
Southampton	2008–09	Championship	40	2	1	0	2	0	—		43	2
Southampton	2009–10	League One	12	0	4	0	2	0	3	0	21	0
Southampton	Total		58	2	5	0	4	0	3	0	70	2
Career total			479	11	47	1	45	0	12	1	583	13

== Honours ==
Tottenham Hotspur

- Football League Cup runner-up: 2001–02

Southampton

- Football League Trophy: 2009–10
