= Carl Cort =

Footballer (born 1977)

Personal information
- Full name: Carl Edward Richard Cort
- Date of birth: 1 November 1977 (age 49)
- Place of birth: Southwark, England
- Height: 6 ft 3 in (1.91 m)
- Position: Forward

Youth career
- –1996: Wimbledon

Senior career*
| Years | Team | Apps | (Gls) |
| 1996–2000 | Wimbledon | 73 | (16) |
| 1997 | → Lincoln City (loan) | 6 | (1) |
| 2000–2004 | Newcastle United | 22 | (7) |
| 2004–2007 | Wolverhampton Wanderers | 94 | (31) |
| 2007–2008 | Leicester City | 14 | (0) |
| 2008 | Marbella | 10 | (0) |
| 2008–2009 | Norwich City | 12 | (1) |
| 2009–2011 | Brentford | 31 | (6) |
| 2012–2014 | Tampa Bay Rowdies | 22 | (4) |
| Total | | 284 | (66) |

International career
| 1997–2000 | England U21 | 14 | (8) |
| 2011–2012 | Guyana | 6 | (0) |
- * Club domestic league appearances and goals

Carl Edward Richard Cort (born 1 November 1977) is a former professional footballer who played as a forward.

He notably played in the Premier League for Wimbledon, Newcastle United and Wolverhampton Wanderers, also playing in the Football League for Lincoln City, Leicester City, Norwich City and Brentford. He also had a spell with Spanish club UD Marbella and finished his professional career with North American Soccer League side Tampa Bay Rowdies.

Born in England, he represented the England U21 earning 14 caps and scoring 8 goals, before switching his allegiance to Guyana, although not playing for them until 2011 during the final few years of his career. He was capped six times between 2011 and 2012 and failed to score a goal.

== Career ==
=== Wimbledon ===
Cort, born in London of Guyanese descent, began his career with Wimbledon as a teenager. He went on a one-month loan to Lincoln City in February 1997, and when he came back to the Dons he made his debut as a substitute against Aston Villa on 9 April 1997. He had to wait until the start of the next season to make his second appearance; on 13 September 1997 Cort started away against Newcastle United and scored in the first minute as Wimbledon went on to win 3–1. Three days later he scored twice against Millwall in the League Cup. A place in the England under-21s soon followed. Another highlight at Wimbledon was scoring a hat trick against Sunderland in the League Cup in October 1999.

=== Newcastle United ===
Newcastle boss Bobby Robson paid £7 million to sign Cort on a five-year contract in the summer of 2000, seeing off competition from Tottenham Hotspur and Leicester City. After making his debut against Manchester United at Old Trafford, he scored on his Newcastle home debut, against Derby County, but struggled with hamstring problems and underwent surgery after only a few appearances for his new club. He did eventually return to the first team in March 2001, and went on to score five goals in ten appearances before the season ended.

In the 2001–02 season, injury ruined his season again. Cort was ruled out until March due to injuries to his ankle and knee. He travelled to the United States for specialist treatment and was treated by the same surgeon who treated future teammate Joleon Lescott. The injuries appeared to take their toll, and Cort struggled to make an impact in the Premier League. His only league appearance in the 2002–03 season was a four-minute cameo as a substitute at West Ham.

=== Wolverhampton Wanderers ===
Having recovered from injury, he moved to Wolverhampton Wanderers for £2 million during January 2004, signing a three-and-a-half-year contract. Wolves manager Dave Jones had previously attempted to bring Cort to Molineux during their promotion campaign of 2002–03. He scored five goals for his new club that season but could not prevent relegation from the top flight. In the 2004–05 season, his form improved and he scored 16 goals in 40 appearances. Wolves had an indifferent season in 2005–06. Cort began the season well, scoring nine goals in the first 11 matches, including a hat-trick against Queens Park Rangers. Injury interrupted his season again, and by the end of May, Cort had added only two more to his tally, totalling 11 goals in 24 appearances. After the following campaign was again plagued by injury, he was released by Wolves in May 2007.

=== Leicester City ===
On 8 June 2007, Cort signed a two-year contract with Leicester City. He scored his only goal for the club in a 4–3 League Cup defeat to Chelsea on 31 October. Although it won Leicester City's Goal of the Month for October, Cort failed to score a single league goal, and he was transfer listed on 23 December. He was released by the club by mutual consent on 11 January.

=== Later career ===
On 30 January 2008, Cort joined Spanish club UD Marbella, who were then playing in the Segunda División B.

Cort returned to England when he signed for Norwich City on 9 December 2008 until the end of the 2008–09 season. He made his debut for Norwich against Reading at the Madejski Stadium and scored his first goal for the club in a 3–3 draw at Wolves on 3 February 2009. This was his first league goal since March 2006, when he netted for Wolves in a Championship fixture at Hull City. Following Norwich's relegation to League One Cort left the club after having his contract terminated by mutual consent.

After leaving Norwich, Cort went on trial with Wycombe Wanderers but was not offered a contract. He later went on to sign for Brentford on a five-month deal, which was then extended to the end of the season. He scored his first goal for Brentford against Swindon Town on 3 October 2009 and added another 5 goals making it 6 goals in 26 appearances. In June 2010, Cort signed a new one-year contract at Brentford, but was later released in January 2011.

Cort had been training with the AFC Wimbledon reserve/development squad. It was reported that he had scored in an appearance for the reserve team towards the end of October 2011.

On 10 August 2012, Tampa Bay Rowdies announced they had signed Cort.

== Personal life ==
He is the elder brother of fellow professional footballer Leon Cort, and the younger brother of non-League footballer Wayne Cort. He is also the half-brother of AC Milan midfielder Ruben Loftus-Cheek.

== Career statistics ==
=== Club ===
Appearances and goals by club, season and competition
| Team | Season | League | | | National cup | | League cup | | Other | | Total | |
| Team | Season | Division | Apps | Goals | Apps | Goals | Apps | Goals | Apps | Goals | Apps | Goals |
|---|---|---|---|---|---|---|---|---|---|---|---|---|
| Wimbledon | 1996–97 | Premier League | 1 | 0 | 0 | 0 | 0 | 0 | — | | 1 | 0 |
| Wimbledon | 1997–98 | Premier League | 22 | 4 | 5 | 0 | 2 | 2 | — | | 29 | 6 |
| Wimbledon | 1998–99 | Premier League | 16 | 3 | 3 | 1 | 3 | 0 | — | | 22 | 4 |
| Wimbledon | 1999–2000 | Premier League | 34 | 9 | 2 | 1 | 5 | 5 | — | | 41 | 15 |
| Wimbledon | Total | | 73 | 16 | 10 | 2 | 10 | 7 | 0 | 0 | 93 | 25 |
| Lincoln City (loan) | 1996–97 | Third Division | 6 | 1 | 0 | 0 | 0 | 0 | 0 | 0 | 6 | 1 |
| Newcastle United | 2000–01 | Premier League | 13 | 6 | 0 | 0 | 2 | 1 | — | | 15 | 7 |
| Newcastle United | 2001–02 | Premier League | 8 | 1 | 2 | 0 | 0 | 0 | — | | 10 | 1 |
| Newcastle United | 2002–03 | Premier League | 1 | 0 | 0 | 0 | 1 | 0 | 1 (Note: Appearance in the Champions League) | 0 | 3 | 0 |
| Newcastle United | Total | | 22 | 7 | 2 | 0 | 3 | 1 | 1 | 0 | 28 | 8 |
| Wolverhampton Wanderers | 2003–04 | Premier League | 16 | 5 | 0 | 0 | 0 | 0 | — | | 16 | 5 |
| Wolverhampton Wanderers | 2004–05 | Championship | 37 | 15 | 2 | 1 | 1 | 0 | — | | 40 | 16 |
| Wolverhampton Wanderers | 2005–06 | Championship | 31 | 11 | 2 | 0 | 0 | 0 | — | | 33 | 11 |
| Wolverhampton Wanderers | 2006–07 | Championship | 10 | 0 | 0 | 0 | 0 | 0 | — | | 10 | 0 |
| Wolverhampton Wanderers | Total | | 94 | 31 | 4 | 1 | 1 | 0 | 0 | 0 | 99 | 32 |
| Leicester City | 2007–08 | Championship | 14 | 0 | 0 | 0 | 1 | 1 | — | | 15 | 1 |
| Marbella | 2007–08 | Segunda División B | 10 | 0 | 0 | 0 | — | | 0 | 0 | 10 | 0 |
| Norwich City | 2008–09 | Championship | 12 | 1 | 1 | 0 | 0 | 0 | — | | 13 | 1 |
| Brentford | 2009–10 | League One | 28 | 6 | 2 | 1 | 0 | 0 | 0 | 0 | 30 | 7 |
| Brentford | 2010–11 | League One | 3 | 0 | 0 | 0 | 0 | 0 | 1 (Note: Appearance in the Football League Trophy) | 0 | 4 | 0 |
| Brentford | Total | | 31 | 6 | 2 | 1 | 0 | 0 | 1 | 0 | 34 | 7 |
| Tampa Bay Rowdies | 2012 | NASL | 8 | 2 | 0 | 0 | 0 | 0 | 0 | 0 | 8 | 2 |
| Tampa Bay Rowdies | 2013 | NASL | 11 | 2 | 0 | 0 | 0 | 0 | 0 | 0 | 11 | 2 |
| Tampa Bay Rowdies | 2014 | NASL | 3 | 0 | 0 | 0 | 0 | 0 | 0 | 0 | 3 | 0 |
| Tampa Bay Rowdies | Total | | 22 | 4 | 0 | 0 | 0 | 0 | 0 | 0 | 22 | 4 |
| Career total | | | 284 | 66 | 19 | 4 | 15 | 9 | 2 | 0 | 320 | 79 |
