= Scott Fitzgerald (footballer, born 1969) =

Footballer (born 1969)

Personal information
- Full name: Scott Brian Fitzgerald
- Date of birth: 13 August 1969 (age 57)
- Place of birth: Westminster, England
- Height: 6 ft 0 in (1.83 m)
- Position: Defender

Team information
- Current team: Millwall (academy director)

Youth career
- –1989: Wimbledon

Senior career*
Years	Team	Apps	(Gls)
1989–1997	Wimbledon	106	(1)
1995	→ Sheffield United (loan)	6	(0)
1996	→ Millwall (loan)	7	(0)
1996–1997	→ Millwall (loan)	0	(0)
1997–2000	Millwall	82	(1)
2000–2004	Colchester United	116	(0)
2004	→ Brentford (loan)	9	(0)
2004–2005	Brentford	12	(0)
Total		338	(2)

International career
1991	Republic of Ireland U21	4	(1)
1992	Republic of Ireland B	1	(0)

Managerial career
- 2006–2007: Brentford
- 2013–2014: Millwall (caretaker)
- * Club domestic league appearances and goals

Scott Brian Fitzgerald (born 13 August 1969) is a football coach and former professional player, who is academy director at Millwall.

As a player, he was a defender who notably played in the Premier League for Wimbledon and in the Football League for Sheffield United, Millwall, Colchester United and Brentford. He was capped at Republic of Ireland U21 and B team level.

After retiring he began his career in coaching, heading the youth teams at Brentford, Gillingham and Millwall. He had a spell as a first team manager at Brentford during the 2006–07 season. Fitzgerald is currently academy director at Millwall.

== Club career ==
=== Wimbledon ===
A central defender, Fitzgerald signed a professional contract with First Division club Wimbledon at the start of the 1987–88 season, but did not make his debut for nearly three years, when he came on as a substitute against Tottenham Hotspur on 28 April 1990. He did not play again until the 1991–92 season, when he played made 36 First Division appearances and scored his first goal for the club. Fitzgerald made 20 appearances during the inaugural Premier League season and then made 28 appearances during the 1993–94 campaign.

Fitzgerald made only 17 appearances during the 1994–95 season and lost his place in the team during 1995–96, making only four appearances. He failed to appear at all during the 1996–97 season and left the Dons in July 1997. Fitzgerald made 125 appearances and scored one goal during his decade as a professional with Wimbledon.

Fitzgerald moved to First Division club Sheffield United on loan 23 November 1995 and made six appearances.

=== Millwall ===
Fitzgerald joined Second Division club Millwall on a one-month loan on 11 October 1996, making seven appearances before his loan expired. He returned to the Lions for a second one-month loan on 24 December 1996, but failed to make an appearance before his loan expired. Fitzgerald signed for Millwall permanently on 29 July 1997 for a £50,000 fee.

Over the following three seasons, Fitzgerald made 93 appearances and scored one goal, which came with an injury time winner in a 2–1 victory over Wycombe Wanderers on 15 August 1998. Fitzgerald departed the club on 19 October 2000, having lost his place in the team and making only one appearance during the 2000–01 season.

=== Colchester United ===
Fitzgerald joined Second Division club Colchester United on 19 October 2000 on a free transfer and remained with the club until the end of the 2003–04 season, when he was released. Over the course of his time with the Us, Fitzgerald made 128 appearances and scored no goals.

=== Brentford ===
Fitzgerald joined Second Division club Brentford on loan on 16 March 2004 and played an important role in the Bees' successful battle against relegation in the 2003–04 season. He signed a permanent contract on 11 June 2004, though he featured sparingly during the 2004–05 season. The final appearance of Fitzgerald's career came in the last game of the regular season, playing alongside fellow veteran Andy Myers in central defence during a 2–1 victory over already-promoted Hull City.

Fitzgerald retired at the end of the 2004–05 season, following Brentford's defeat to Sheffield Wednesday in the League One play-off semi-finals. He made 24 appearances during his time with the Bees. Though he had officially retired at the end of the 2004–05 season, Fitzgerald remained on the playing staff on a non-contract basis during 2005–06.

== International career ==
Fitzgerald was a Republic of Ireland B international.

== Coaching career ==
While still a first team player, Fitzgerald was handed the role of assistant youth team manager of League One club Brentford by first team manager Martin Allen in October 2004. Upon his retirement as a player at the end of the 2004–05 season, he signed a one-year contract to manage the Brentford youth team. He left his role as youth team manager upon being appointed first team manager in November 2006 and departed the club in April 2007.

Fitzgerald was appointed youth team manager at League One club Gillingham in July 2007. He worked in the role for four months before leaving the club in December 2007.

Fitzgerald was named youth team manager at former club Millwall in December 2007. In 2012, Fitzgerald oversaw the transfer of Millwall's youth development system to a Category Two academy. Fitzgerald is currently academy director with the Lions.

== Managerial career ==
=== Brentford ===
Fitzgerald became caretaker manager of League One club Brentford on 18 November 2006, following the sacking of Leroy Rosenior. The position was made permanent on 21 December 2006. Despite a brief improvement in fortunes in February 2007, Brentford were relegated from League One following a 3–1 defeat to Crewe Alexandra on 9 April 2007. Fitzgerald's contract was terminated a day later and he departed the club. Looking back in November 2009, Fitzgerald stated that "the experience has put me off managing a league club again".

=== Millwall ===
On 26 December 2013, Fitzgerald and Development Squad manager Neil Harris were appoint joint-caretaker managers following the sacking of Steve Lomas. Fitzgerald ruled himself out of the running for the manager's job the following day. The pair managed to muster just one point from their three Championship games in charge and returned to their original roles on 6 January 2014, following the appointment of Ian Holloway.

== Career statistics ==
Appearances and goals by club, season and competition
Club	Season	League			FA Cup		League Cup		Other		Total	
Club	Season	Division	Apps	Goals	Apps	Goals	Apps	Goals	Apps	Goals	Apps	Goals
Wimbledon	1989–90	First Division	1	0	0	0	0	0	0	0	1	0
Wimbledon	1991–92	First Division	36	1	0	0	0	0	0	0	36	1
Wimbledon	1992–93	Premier League	20	0	0	0	0	0	—		20	0
Wimbledon	1993–94	Premier League	28	0	0	0	2	0	—		30	0
Wimbledon	1994–95	Premier League	17	0	0	0	3	0	—		20	0
Wimbledon	1995–96	Premier League	4	0	0	0	0	0	—		4	0
Wimbledon	Total		106	1	5	0	13	0	1	0	125	1
Sheffield United (loan)	1995–96	First Division	6	0	—		—		—		6	0
Millwall (loan)	1996–97	Second Division	7	0	—		—		—		7	0
Millwall	1997–98	Second Division	18	0	0	0	1	0	2 (Note: Appearances in Football League Trophy)	0	21	0
Millwall	1998–99	Second Division	32	1	1	0	2	0	2	0	37	1
Millwall	1999–00	Second Division	31	0	1	0	1	0	1	0	34	0
Millwall	2000–01	Second Division	1	0	—		0	0	—		1	0
Millwall	Total		82	1	2	0	4	0	5	0	93	1
Colchester United	2000–01	Second Division	30	0	1	0	—		1	0	32	0
Colchester United	2001–02	Second Division	37	0	2	0	2	0	1	0	42	0
Colchester United	2002–03	Second Division	26	0	0	0	0	0		0	26	0
Colchester United	2003–04	Second Division	23	0	2	0	1	0	2	0	28	0
Colchester United	Total		116	0	5	0	3	0	4	0	128	0
Brentford (loan)	2003–04	Second Division	9	0	—		—		—		9	0
Brentford	2004–05	League One	12	0	1	0	1	0	1	0	15	0
Career total			345	2	13	0	26	0	11	0	395	2

== Manager statistics ==
Managerial record by team and tenure
Team	From	To	Record					Ref
Team	From	To	P	W	D	L	Win %	Ref
Brentford	18 November 2006	10 April 2007	25	4	5	16	16.0	
Millwall (caretaker)	26 December 2013	6 January 2014	3	0	1	2	0.0	
Total			28	4	6	18	14.3	—
