= Stewart Castledine =

English footballer

Personal information
- Date of birth: 22 January 1973 (age 53)
- Place of birth: Wandsworth, London, England
- Position: Midfielder

Senior career*
Years	Team	Apps	(Gls)
1991–2000	Wimbledon	28	(4)
1995–1996	→ Wycombe Wanderers (loan)	7	(3)
2000–2002	Wycombe Wanderers	18	(0)
Total		52	(7)
- * Club domestic league appearances and goals

Stewart Castledine (born 22 January 1973) is an English former professional footballer, actor, model and television presenter.

As a footballer, he was a midfielder who notably played in the Premier League for Wimbledon before playing with Wycombe Wanderers in the Football League over two separate spells. Castledine made 28 league top flight appearances for the Dons.

Following retirement he worked as a TV presenter for the BBC and presented Big Strong Boys and Houses Behaving Badly. He also worked as a model for DKNY and Topman and had a role as an actor in the film The Pink Panther.

== Playing career ==
Educated at Teddington School, Castledine had a ten-year career as a professional footballer, playing in the Premier League for Wimbledon and in Division 1 for Wycombe Wanderers.

He began his career with Wimbledon as an apprentice in 1989, turning professional for the 1991–92 season and making his debut in the old Football League First Division against Norwich City in a 1–1 draw on 25 April 1992. He then scored in his full debut against Coventry City, went on to score further Premier League goals against Everton and Leeds, and remained with the Dons in the Premier League for a further eight years, although he was never a regular member of the first team. During that time he played in matches against Manchester United, Chelsea, Arsenal and Liverpool, amongst others.

He also had a loan spell with Wycombe Wanderers in the 1995–96 season, scoring three goals in seven Division Two games, and finally left the Dons on 7 July 2000. His departure coincided with Wimbledon's relegation from the Premier League after 14 years of top flight football. He then signed for Wycombe Wanderers, making 22 appearances over the next two seasons before finally retiring as a player at the age of 29. While at Adams Park, he played under his old Wimbledon teammate Lawrie Sanchez, who was Wycombe manager.

== Post-playing career ==
Immediately after his football career, Castledine become a television presenter, hosting BBC One's Big Strong Boys and Houses Behaving Badly. He also modelled for companies such as DKNY and Topman. Along with modelling Castledine had some time in the film industry with films such as The Pink Panther, in which he played a French goalkeeper.

Castledine then moved into the business sector of sport. He was director of football for Soccerex, and a director for sports marketing agency Sports Revolution. Castledine is now commercial director for the sports division of talent management agency James Grant.

He later coached AFC Wimbledon Ladies.

== Personal life ==
He is married to TV presenter Lucy Alexander; the couple have two children, Leo, who is a footballer for Middlesbrough, and EastEnders actress Kitty. He has two sisters, Jenny and Ellen. His brother-in-law, Ian Claxton, married to his sister Ellen, is from a rugby background, with his father, Terrence Claxton, having played rugby for the Harlequins in the late 1970s and early 1980s with his brothers, Mickey and Gary.

== Career statistics ==
Appearances and goals by club, season and competition
Club	Season	League			FA Cup		EFL Cup		Other		Total	
Club	Season	Division	Apps	Goals	Apps	Goals	Apps	Goals	Apps	Goals	Apps	Goals
Wimbledon	1991–92	First Division	2	0	0	0	0	0	—		2	0
Wimbledon	1992-93	Premier League	0	0	0	0	0	0	—		0	0
Wimbledon	1993–94	Premier League	3	1	0	0	0	0	—		3	1
Wimbledon	1994–95	Premier League	6	1	0	0	0	0	—		6	1
Wimbledon	1995–96	Premier League	4	1	0	0	0	0	0	0	4	1
Wimbledon	1996–97	Premier League	6	1	0	0	1	1	—		7	2
Wimbledon	1997–98	Premier League	6	0	3	0	3	2	—		12	2
Wimbledon	1998–99	Premier League	1	0	0	0	0	0	—		1	0
Wimbledon	1999–00	Premier League	0	0	0	0	0	0	—		0	0
Wimbledon	Total		28	4	3	0	4	3	0	0	35	7
Wycombe Wanderers (loan)	1995–96	Second Division	7	3	0	0	0	0	0	0	7	3
Wycombe Wanderers	2000–01	Second Division	17	0	2	0	3	1	1 (Note: Appearances in EFL Trophy)	0	23	1
Wycombe Wanderers	Total		17	0	2	0	3	1	1	0	23	1
Career total			52	7	5	0	7	4	1	0	65	11
