= Andy Clarke (footballer) =

English footballer (born 1967)

Personal information
- Full name: Andrew Weston Clarke
- Date of birth: 22 July 1967 (age 59)
- Place of birth: Islington, England
- Height: 5 ft 10 in (1.78 m)
- Position: Forward

Youth career
- Islington St Mary's

Senior career*
Years	Team	Apps	(Gls)
1989–1991	Barnet	63	(29)
1991–1999	Wimbledon	170	(17)
1998	→ Port Vale (loan)	6	(0)
1999	→ Northampton Town (loan)	4	(0)
1999–2005	Peterborough United	230	(57)
Total		473	(103)

International career
- England Non-League XI
- * Club domestic league appearances and goals

Andrew Weston Clarke (born 22 July 1967) is an English former footballer. A striker, he scored 74 goals in 410 league games in a 14-year career in the English Football League.

After helping Barnet to the Conference title in 1990–91, he was signed to Wimbledon, a Football League side, at the relatively late age of 23. He played for the "Dons" in the Premier League before being loaned out to Port Vale in 1998 and Northampton Town in 1999. He joined Peterborough United in June 1999. He scored the only goal of the Third Division play-off final in 2000. He retired in May 2005.

== Career ==
=== Barnet ===
Clarke originally started playing Sunday League football in the Greek Community League, before moving on to Islington St Mary's in the Spartan League. He was signed to Barnet by manager Barry Fry. He scored on his debut for the "Bees" in a 5–1 defeat at Sutton United on 6 May 1989. He made a huge impression at Underhill over the next 18 months and was named as the club's Player of the Year for 1990. He also represented the England Non-League XI before signing for Ray Harford's Wimbledon in February 1991 for £250,000 – a record fee for a non-League player. At the end of the season, Barry Fry led the "Bees" to promotion to the Football League as champions of the Conference.

=== Wimbledon ===
Clarke was immediately thrown into the first team at Plough Lane, playing 12 league games and scoring three goals as the "Dons" finished seventh in the First Division. New boss Joe Kinnear then led the club to a 13th-place finish in 1991–92. The club then became founder members of the Premier League, posting a 12th-place finish in 1992–93; Clarke scored five goals in 33 appearances. Despite being forced to play their home games at Crystal Palace's Selhurst Park, they rose to sixth in 1993–94, finishing higher than all London clubs except Arsenal. Wimbledon then finished ninth in 1994–95, and Clarke won the BBC Goal of the Month award for February with his goal against Liverpool at Anfield in the FA Cup fifth round. He scored four goals in 1995–96, helping the "Wombles" into 14th place. Clarke hit the net just once in 1996–97 as the "Crazy Gang" hit eighth in the league and reached the semi-finals of both domestic cup competitions. He played 20 games in 1997–98, again scoring just one goal, as Wimbledon dropped to 15th. He played 212 league and cup games for the club, scoring 23 goals. Clarke started the 1998–99 campaign on loan at First Division side Port Vale but made just six goalless appearances for John Rudge's "Valiants". He spent four weeks on loan at Second Division side Northampton Town in January 1999 but made just four goalless appearances for the struggling Sixfields side.

=== Peterborough United ===
He was given a free transfer in June 1999 and joined Third Division club Peterborough United. He rediscovered his scoring form at London Road under Barry Fry, his former manager at Barnet, bagging 18 goals in 43 appearances in 1999–2000. The "Posh" finished fifth, and Clarke scored at Underhill in a 5–1 win over Barnet in the play-off semi-finals. He went on to score in the play-off final at Wembley, the only goal of the game, to take Peterborough into the Second Division; he said that "It's the best moment of my life." Clarke hit 11 goals in 48 games in 2000–01, helping Peterborough to acclimatise well to the third tier. In December 2001, he failed a random drug test – the results being released in February the following year. Accepting his explanation that it was a 'one-off' he was given a four-week ban. He quickly signed a new contract with the club in April 2002, and returned to the first-team. He hit eight goals on the field in 37 games in 2001–02. Scoring 19 goals in 48 games, he described the 2002–03 season as his "best ever". He scored 12 goals in 50 games in 2003–04, helping Peterborough to avoid relegation by three places and two points. In May 2004, the 36-year-old put pen to paper on a new one-year contract. He remained popular throughout his time at Peterborough, even though he only scored three goals in 37 appearances in the 2004–05 relegation campaign, before being released in May 2005. In all he scored 73 goals in 266 appearances in all competitions for Peterborough.

== Post-retirement ==
After retiring, he worked on a market stall in the centre of Barnet.

== Career statistics ==
Appearances and goals by club, season and competition
Club	Season	League			FA Cup		Other		Total	
Club	Season	Division	Apps	Goals	Apps	Goals	Apps	Goals	Apps	Goals
Barnet	1988–89	Conference	1	0	0	0	0	0	1	0
Barnet	1989–90	Conference	36	17	5	2	1	0	42	19
Barnet	1990–91	Conference	26	12	9	1	1	1	36	14
Barnet	Total		63	29	14	3	2	1	79	33
Wimbledon	1990–91	First Division	12	3	0	0	0	0	12	3
Wimbledon	1991–92	First Division	34	3	1	0	2	1	37	4
Wimbledon	1992–93	Premier League	33	5	3	0	3	0	39	5
Wimbledon	1993–94	Premier League	23	2	1	0	6	1	30	3
Wimbledon	1994–95	Premier League	25	1	3	1	3	0	31	2
Wimbledon	1995–96	Premier League	18	2	4	1	2	1	24	4
Wimbledon	1996–97	Premier League	11	1	1	0	6	0	18	1
Wimbledon	1997–98	Premier League	14	0	4	0	3	1	21	1
Wimbledon	1998–99	Premier League	0	0	0	0	0	0	0	0
Wimbledon	Total		170	17	17	2	25	4	212	23
Port Vale (loan)	1998–99	First Division	6	0	0	0	0	0	6	0
Northampton Town (loan)	1998–99	Second Division	4	0	0	0	0	0	4	0
Peterborough United	1999–2000	Third Division	37	15	2	1	4	2	43	18
Peterborough United	2000–01	Second Division	42	9	4	1	2	1	48	11
Peterborough United	2001–02	Second Division	28	5	6	2	3	1	37	8
Peterborough United	2002–03	Second Division	45	16	1	1	2	2	48	19
Peterborough United	2003–04	Second Division	45	9	2	2	3	1	50	12
Peterborough United	2004–05	League One	33	3	3	0	2	0	38	3
Peterborough United	Total		230	57	18	7	16	7	264	71
Career total			473	103	49	12	43	12	565	127

== Honours ==
Barnet

- Conference National: 1990–91

Peterborough United

- Football League Third Division play-offs: 2000

Individual

- Barnet Player of the Year: 1989–90
