= Samuel Okikiolu =

English footballer

Personal information
- Full name: Samuel Kola Okikiolu
- Date of birth: 15 January 1982 (age 44)
- Place of birth: London, England
- Position: Centre back

Youth career
- 1998–2001: Wimbledon

Senior career*
Years	Team	Apps	(Gls)
2001–2002	Wimbledon	0	(0)
2001	→ Clyde (loan)	3	(0)
2002	Aylesbury United	1	(0)
2004–2005	Staines Town	?	(?)
2005–2006	Margate	12	(0)
2006	Harrow Borough	?	(?)
2006–2007	Folkestone Invicta	26	(0)
2007	East Thurrock United	?	(?)
2007–2008	Folkestone Invicta	31	(0)
2008	Enfield Town	?	(?)
- * Club domestic league appearances and goals

Samuel Kola Okikiolu (born 15 January 1982) is an English former professional footballer who played as a centre back.

== Career ==
Born in London, Okikiolu began his career with Wimbledon, and joined Scottish side Clyde on a two-month loan spell in August 2001, making three appearances for them in the Scottish Football League. Okikioulu left Wimbledon in 2002 without having made a first-team appearance, and joined Aylesbury United, making one appearance for them in September 2002. Okikiolu joined Staines Town in July 2004, and later played for Margate, before signing for Harrow Borough in August 2006. Okikiolu later spent two spells at Folkestone Invicta, and also played for East Thurrock and Enfield Town.
