= Hans Segers =

Dutch footballer (born 1961)

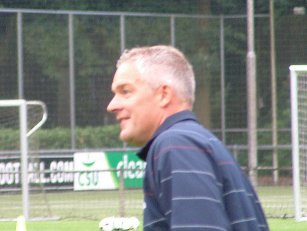

Personal information
- Full name: Johannes Segers
- Date of birth: 30 October 1961 (age 64)
- Place of birth: Eindhoven, Netherlands
- Height: 5 ft 11 in (1.80 m)
- Position: Goalkeeper

Senior career*
| Years | Team | Apps | (Gls) |
| 1981–1984 | PSV Eindhoven | 16 | (0) |
| 1984–1988 | Nottingham Forest | 58 | (0) |
| 1987 | → Stoke City (loan) | 1 | (0) |
| 1987–1988 | → Sheffield United (loan) | 10 | (0) |
| 1988 | → Dunfermline Athletic (loan) | 4 | (0) |
| 1988–1996 | Wimbledon | 262 | (0) |
| 1996–1997 | Wolverhampton Wanderers | 0 | (0) |
| 1997 | Woking | ? | (0) |
| 1997–1998 | Wolverhampton Wanderers | 11 | (0) |
| 1998–2001 | Tottenham Hotspur | 1 | (0) |
| Total | | 363 | (0) |
- * Club domestic league appearances and goals

Johannes "Hans" Segers (born 30 October 1961) is a Dutch football coach and former professional player who played as a goalkeeper.

As a player, he notably spent eight years with Wimbledon where he featured in the Premier League. He also played in England's top flight for Nottingham Forest and Tottenham Hotspur. He had spells in his native the Netherlands with PSV Eindhoven and in Scotland with Dunfermline Athletic, and in the Football League with Sheffield United, Stoke City, Wolverhampton Wanderers.

== Playing career ==
Segers was born in Eindhoven, North Brabant. His early career was with home-town club PSV Eindhoven, before being signed for Nottingham Forest by Brian Clough during the 1983–84 season. In his first season with Forest he played 32 times but lost his place to Steve Sutton and played in 12 matches in 1985–86. He made 18 appearances in 1986–87 and signed for Stoke City on loan in March 1987 playing in one Second Division match for the "Potters", a 4–1 defeat away at West Bromwich Albion. He was used less frequently than Sutton during that season 1987–88, appearing in five matches, while Sutton remained the preferred choice in goal. He spent time that season out on loan at Sheffield United and Scottish side Dunfermline Athletic.

In 1988, Segers joined Wimbledon as the replacement for Dave Beasant in the aftermath of their FA Cup glory in 1988. His playing style was considered compatible with Wimbledon's tactics at the time, which emphasized long goal kicks, similar to his predecessor Dave Beasant. He would remain the club's first choice goalkeeper over the next eight seasons, making 265 league appearances. Wimbledon did not secure additional major titles during Segers’s tenure, but the club consistently remained in the top flight, never finishing below 14th place, and peaked at sixth place in the FA Premier League in 1994.

In 1994, he was accused of involvement in match fixing, together with Liverpool goalkeeper Bruce Grobbelaar, Wimbledon striker John Fashanu and a Malaysian businessman. The case was referred to Winchester Crown Court for a criminal trial in 1997 but all four defendants were cleared. In December 1997, Grobbelaar and Segers were found guilty by the Football Association of breaching betting regulations.

In the summer of 1996, Segers signed for Wolverhampton Wanderers as understudy to Mike Stowell. A brief spell in the Conference with Woking followed, before returning to Wolves again. A highlight during his time at Wolves was helping them reach the semi-finals of the 1997–98 FA Cup. In the quarter-finals, against Premier League side Leeds United, Wolves were leading 1-0 before a young Robbie Keane conceded a penalty in the dying minutes. However Segers saved Jimmy Floyd Hasselbaink's penalty to see his side through.

Segers returned to the Premier League with Tottenham Hotspur, where he spent three years (playing just one league game) primarily as a backup goalkeeper until he finally retired in the summer of 2001, a few months before his 40th birthday.

== Coaching career ==
He was goalkeeper-coach at Tottenham Hotspur until 26 October 2007 when he was asked to stand down with immediate effect following the sacking of Martin Jol.

Segers returned to his home-town club, PSV Eindhoven as a goalkeeping coach in July 2008 until June 2011, when he linked up again Jol as Fulham's goalkeeping coach.

In November 2018 Hans assumed the role of goalkeeper coach with the Australia national team until the completion of the 2019 AFC Asian Cup.

Segers was goalkeepers coach of Eerste Divisie club FC Eindhoven between 2014 and 2017, and again from 2021.

== Career statistics ==
Appearances and goals by club, season and competition
| Club | Season | League | | | FA Cup | | League Cup | | Other (Note: Includes Full Members Cup) | | Total | |
| Club | Season | Division | Apps | Goals | Apps | Goals | Apps | Goals | Apps | Goals | Apps | Goals |
|---|---|---|---|---|---|---|---|---|---|---|---|---|
| Nottingham Forest | 1984–85 | First Division | 28 | 0 | 4 | 0 | 0 | 0 | 0 | 0 | 32 | 0 |
| Nottingham Forest | 1985–86 | First Division | 11 | 0 | 0 | 0 | 1 | 0 | 0 | 0 | 12 | 0 |
| Nottingham Forest | 1986–87 | First Division | 14 | 0 | 1 | 0 | 3 | 0 | 0 | 0 | 18 | 0 |
| Nottingham Forest | 1987–88 | First Division | 5 | 0 | 0 | 0 | 0 | 0 | 0 | 0 | 5 | 0 |
| Nottingham Forest | Total | | 58 | 0 | 5 | 0 | 4 | 0 | 0 | 0 | 66 | 0 |
| Stoke City (loan) | 1986–87 | Second Division | 1 | 0 | 0 | 0 | 0 | 0 | 0 | 0 | 1 | 0 |
| Sheffield United (loan) | 1987–88 | Second Division | 10 | 0 | 0 | 0 | 0 | 0 | 1 | 0 | 11 | 0 |
| Dunfermline Athletic(loan) | 1987–88 | Scottish Premier Division | 4 | 0 | 0 | 0 | 0 | 0 | 0 | 0 | 4 | 0 |
| Wimbledon | 1988–89 | First Division | 33 | 0 | 4 | 0 | 4 | 0 | 2 | 0 | 43 | 0 |
| Wimbledon | 1989–90 | First Division | 38 | 0 | 1 | 0 | 5 | 0 | 3 | 0 | 47 | 0 |
| Wimbledon | 1990–91 | First Division | 37 | 0 | 3 | 0 | 2 | 0 | 1 | 0 | 43 | 0 |
| Wimbledon | 1991–92 | First Division | 41 | 0 | 2 | 0 | 2 | 0 | 1 | 0 | 46 | 0 |
| Wimbledon | 1992–93 | Premier League | 41 | 0 | 5 | 0 | 4 | 0 | 0 | 0 | 50 | 0 |
| Wimbledon | 1993–94 | Premier League | 41 | 0 | 3 | 0 | 6 | 0 | 0 | 0 | 50 | 0 |
| Wimbledon | 1994–95 | Premier League | 32 | 0 | 4 | 0 | 3 | 0 | 0 | 0 | 41 | 0 |
| Wimbledon | 1995–96 | Premier League | 4 | 0 | 0 | 0 | 0 | 0 | 0 | 0 | 4 | 0 |
| Wimbledon | Total | | 262 | 0 | 22 | 0 | 26 | 0 | 7 | 0 | 317 | 0 |
| Wolverhampton Wanderers | 1996–97 | First Division | 0 | 0 | 0 | 0 | 0 | 0 | 0 | 0 | 0 | 0 |
| Wolverhampton Wanderers | 1997–98 | First Division | 11 | 0 | 2 | 0 | 0 | 0 | 0 | 0 | 13 | 0 |
| Wolverhampton Wanderers | Total | | 11 | 0 | 2 | 0 | 0 | 0 | 0 | 0 | 13 | 0 |
| Tottenham Hotspur | 1998–99 | Premier League | 1 | 0 | 0 | 0 | 1 | 0 | 0 | 0 | 2 | 0 |
| Career total | | | 347 | 0 | 29 | 0 | 31 | 0 | 8 | 0 | 415 | 0 |
