= Justin Skinner (footballer, born 1972) =

English footballer

Personal information
- Full name: Justin James Skinner
- Date of birth: 17 September 1972 (age 54)
- Place of birth: Dorking, England
- Height: 5 ft 7 in (1.70 m)
- Position: Defender

Youth career
- 1987–1991: Wimbledon

Senior career*
Years	Team	Apps	(Gls)
1991–1996	Wimbledon	2	(0)
1993–1994	→ Bournemouth (loan)	16	(0)
1994–1995	→ Wycombe Wanderers (loan)	5	(0)
1996–1998	Aylesbury United	39	(0)
1998–2006	Gravesend & Northfleet	180	(4)
2006–2008	Margate	46	(1)
Total		288	(5)
- * Club domestic league appearances and goals

Justin James Skinner (born 17 September 1972) is an English former footballer who played as a defender.

He started out as a trainee with Wimbledon but made only two appearances in the Premier League, and he was sent away on loan to Bournemouth and Wycombe Wanderers. In 1996, he was sold to Aylesbury United, spending two seasons there, before moving to Gravesend & Northfleet. He had two spells with the club, split by a period when he was out of football. After spending eight years at the club, he moved to Margate.
