= Steve Talboys =

English footballer (1966–2019)

Personal information
- Full name: Steven John Talboys
- Date of birth: 18 September 1966
- Place of birth: Bristol, England
- Date of death: 31 July 2019 (aged 52)
- Place of death: Spain
- Position: Midfielder

Senior career*
Years	Team	Apps	(Gls)
- Forest Green Rovers
- Mangotsfield United
- Bath City
- Trowbridge Town
1987–1992	Gloucester City	227	(65)
1992–1996	Wimbledon	26	(1)
1996–1998	Watford	7	(0)
1998–1999	Aldershot Town	14	(2)
- Kingstonian
- Sutton United
- Paulton Rovers
- Boreham Wood
- Carshalton Athletic
- Hampton & Richmond Borough
2000	Gloucester City	1	(0)
- Staines Town
- * Club domestic league appearances and goals

Steven John Talboys (18 September 1966 – 31 July 2019) was an English professional footballer who played as a midfielder.

He notably played in the Premier League for Wimbledon and in the Football League for Watford, prior to this period he had an extensive career in non-league football and would return to semi-professional football after leaving Watford in 1998. Notable non-league sides include Forest Green Rovers, Bath City, Gloucester City, Aldershot Town, Sutton United and Boreham Wood.

== Playing career ==
He was born in Bristol, England and played for a large number of clubs, mostly in non-league, but played 26 times in the FA Premier League for Wimbledon during the 1990s, and then made a small number of appearances in the third tier of English football for Watford.

He also played semi-professionally for Forest Green Rovers, Mangotsfield United, Bath City, Trowbridge Town, Aldershot Town, Gloucester City, Kingstonian, Sutton United, Paulton Rovers, Boreham Wood, Carshalton Athletic, Hampton & Richmond Borough and Staines Town.

== Personal life ==
Talboys worked as a development executive for Aon Sports.

== Death ==
Talboys died by a heart attack on 31 July 2019, aged 52, in Spain.
