= Peter Fear =

English footballer (born 1973)

Personal information
- Full name: Peter Stanley Fear
- Date of birth: 10 September 1973 (age 53)
- Place of birth: Sutton, London, England
- Position: Midfielder

Senior career*
Years	Team	Apps	(Gls)
1992–1999	Wimbledon	113	(5)
1999–2001	Oxford United	58	(3)
2001–2002	Kettering Town	24	(0)
2002–2004	Crawley Town	49	(6)
2004–2005	Sutton United	23	(3)
2005	Havant & Waterlooville	12	(1)
2005	Carshalton Athletic	5	(0)
2005–2007	Sutton United	25	(2)
Total		305	(19)

International career
1994	England U21	3	(0)
- * Club domestic league appearances and goals

Peter Stanley Fear (born 10 September 1973) is an English football coach and former professional footballer.

As a player, he was a central midfielder who notably played in the Premier League for Wimbledon and in the Football League for Oxford United. He later went on to have a career in non-league football playing for Kettering Town, Crawley Town, Sutton United, Havant & Waterlooville and Carshalton Athletic. He was capped three times by England U21.

== Playing career ==
He is best remembered for his spell with Wimbledon. He signed for them as an apprentice on leaving school in July 1990 and turned professional for the 1992–93 season, when they were FA Premier League founder members. He made his debut against Norwich City on 5 December 1992 when they lost 2–1 in the league at Carrow Road. A further three appearances followed that season, but he had far more chances in the 1993–94 campaign with 23 appearances and his first senior goal, as the Dons finished sixth—equalling their highest-ever league finish. The next two seasons brought limited first-team opportunities, but he had more chances of action in 1996–97, when he scored twice in 18 league games as the Dons finished eighth in the Premier League and were semi-finalists in both domestic cups. For much of the season, the Dons were in the top five of the Premier League and they were rarely more than a few points off the top of the table, so the failure to achieve UEFA Cup qualification was quite a disappointment, though the season was still a great success for a club of Wimbledon's stature.

Fear's career highlight to date was scoring twice in the space of ten minutes, against Tottenham Hotspur in the 1997–98 season. Unfortunately for Fear, Wimbledon went on to lose the game 6–2, and Fear's goals counted merely as a consolation. They were the last goals he would score for the Dons, as he was back on the sidelines and managed just eight league games that season. He made the team just twice in 1998–99, before signing for Oxford United on a free transfer on 13 July 1999.

Oxford had just narrowly avoided bankruptcy when Fear joined them, and had been relegated to Division Two. He played 38 league games over two seasons, scoring three goals, helping them narrowly avoid a second successive relegation in 1999–2000 but not being able to prevent relegation in 2000–01, when Oxford suffered 33 league defeats (the joint second worst ever of any Football League or Premier League club) and went down in bottom place. Fear then left the club.

His last club was Sutton United, then in the Conference South, whom he rejoined in December 2006 after a nine-month absence that took in spells with Havant & Waterlooville and Carshalton Athletic.

He originally signed at the start of the 2004–2005 season after two years with Crawley Town, with whom he won his second Southern League championship medal in 2004; he had also been a member of Kettering Town's successful line-up two seasons earlier.

== Coaching career ==
Fear has since worked as an academy coach at Carshalton Athletic, and as a football coach at Stanley Park school.

== Personal life ==
On the edition broadcast on 23 August 2007, Peter was a contestant on the TV gameshow The Weakest Link. He was also a contestant on Ken Bruce's BBC Radio 2 'phone-in pop music quiz PopMaster on Thursday 13 May 2010 and again on Thursday 31 January 2013. During this last appearance, Peter informed the host that he was working as a London black taxi driver! He now owns 2 roofing companies
