= Efan Ekoku =

Nigeria international footballer

Personal information
- Full name: Efangwu Goziem Ekoku
- Date of birth: 8 June 1967 (age 59)
- Place of birth: Cheetham Hill, England
- Position: Striker

Youth career
- 1989–1990: Sutton United

Senior career*
Years	Team	Apps	(Gls)
1989–1990	Sutton United	57	(12)
1990–1993	AFC Bournemouth	62	(21)
1993–1994	Norwich City	38	(16)
1994–1999	Wimbledon	123	(37)
1999–2001	Grasshoppers	28	(19)
2000–2001	→ Sheffield Wednesday (loan)	32	(7)
2001–2003	Sheffield Wednesday	27	(7)
2003	Brentford	0	(0)
2004	Dublin City	13	(0)
Total		335	(119)

International career
1994–1995	Nigeria	5	(0)
Relatives	Abi Ekoku (brother)
- * Club domestic league appearances and goals

Efangwu Goziem Ekoku (born 8 June 1967) is a Nigerian former professional footballer and sports commentator.

As a player, he was a striker who played in the Premier League for Norwich City and Wimbledon, and in Switzerland for Grasshoppers. He also played in the Football League for AFC Bournemouth and Sheffield Wednesday, as well as in the League of Ireland with Dublin City and in non-league with Sutton United. He was capped five times by Nigeria and featured in World Cup 94.

== Playing career ==
Ekoku began his career at Sutton Utd, but made the move into league football in the summer of 1990 when he signed for AFC Bournemouth, who had just been relegated to the Third Division. His start in the Football League was unspectacular, as he managed just 20 games and three goals during the 1990–91 season for a Cherries side who finished mid table. He did better in 1991–92, scoring 11 goals in 28 league games. He managed seven goals from 14 games in 1992–93 before a £500,000 move to Norwich City on 26 March 1993 took him to the Premier League.

He arrived at Carrow Road when Norwich were in the thick of the title race under the management of Mike Walker. Ekoku scored three goals in ten games in what was left of that campaign, and although Norwich were beaten to the title by Manchester United, Ekoku and his teammates had achieved a third-place finish and qualified for the UEFA Cup.

He scored Norwich's first ever goal in European competition, against Vitesse Arnhem in the UEFA Cup on 15 September 1993, and famously helped them eliminate German club Bayern Munich in the next round. Just ten days later he scored four goals as Norwich beat Everton 5–1 at Goodison Park, becoming the first player to score more than three goals in a Premier League game. He managed a total of 27 league games that season, scoring 12 goals in the league (and 14 times in all competitions), although a slump in league form after manager Mike Walker departed to Everton in January saw the Canaries finish 12th in the league that season.

He remained at Carrow Road until 14 October 1994, when a £1 million fee took him to Wimbledon to replace long-serving John Fashanu as strike partner to Dean Holdsworth. Ekoku had played six times for the Canaries in 1994–95, but didn't score a goal and was faced with competition for a regular place in the Carrow Road attack from new signing Mike Sheron.

He was the club's top scorer in the league that season with nine goals as they finished ninth in the league.

He managed seven goals in the 1995–96 season and had a particularly exciting campaign in 1996–97, when Wimbledon finished eighth and were semi-finalists in both of the domestic cups. He was also their top scorer with 11 league goals.

However, his first team chances were restricted over the next two seasons, and after nearly a year on the transfer list - and a number of clubs expressing interest in signing him - he moved to Switzerland in a £500,000 move to Grasshoppers on 27 August 1999. He had first requested to leave the club a year earlier, when he had declared his interest in joining a bigger Premier League club, and was subject of interest from the likes of Everton, Leicester City, Nottingham Forest and Southampton, with fees as high as £4 million being quoted.

His first season in Switzerland was very successful, as he scored 16 goals in 21 games, although he failed to pick up any silverware. He played a further seven games and scored three goals before returning to England on a free transfer to Sheffield Wednesday on 20 October 2000.

He arrived at Hillsborough just months after the Owls had been relegated from the Premier League and were battling against a second successive relegation. His seven goals from 32 Division One games helped secure survival by some margin as the Owls finished 17th, and they narrowly avoided the drop once again the following year, with Ekoku playing his part by scoring a further seven league goals. However, he did not feature in the disastrous 2002–03 campaign, where the Owls were relegated to Division Two. Having been out of the first team picture for a whole year, he was given a free transfer and signed for Division Two strugglers Brentford in March 2003, but failed to win a call into the squad before his release at the end of the season. He finished his career in Ireland with Dublin City before finally retiring in 2004.

In 2012, Ekoku was inducted into the Norwich City Hall of Fame.

== Media career ==
Ekoku works as a commentator for Premier League Productions, which produces the world feed commentaries. He was a match analyst for the 2010 FIFA World Cup, working for ESPN. In 2013, he appeared as a pundit for the BBC's coverage of the FIFA Confederations Cup. Ekoku is a weekly guest on Football Dynamics on Bloomberg Africa. Ekoku returned to ESPN for the 2014 World Cup as a match analyst. Ekoku works with BT Sport for their coverage of Champions League, Europa League, Ligue 1, and the Bundesliga. He also worked for ESPN during the UEFA Euro 2020 tournament, commentating alongside Derek Rae.

== Coaching career ==
Ekoku has obtained all of his FA and UEFA coaching badges.

== Personal life ==
Ekoku is a regular at AFC Wimbledon, which is the phoenix club of the original Wimbledon for which he played. His brother is former rugby league professional Abi Ekoku.

== Honours ==
Nigeria
Africa Cup of Nations: 1994
Individual
Norwich City F.C. Hall of Fame 2012 Inductee
