= Sam Hammam =

Lebanese businessman (born 1947)

- Born: Samir Georges Nassib Hammam; 17 July 1947 (age 79); Shweir, Lebanon
- Known for: Football club chairman

Samir Georges Nassib Hammam (Arabic: سمير همام, romanized: Samīr Hammām; born 17 July 1947) is a Lebanese businessman, well known for his high-profile involvement in British football clubs, and who most recently relinquished the life presidency of Cardiff City in March 2022 following a legal dispute.

== Wimbledon ==
Originally moving to Wimbledon due to being a keen tennis fan, Hammam became involved in football by buying £40,000 worth of shares at non-league Wimbledon F.C. in two years, eventually taking full control of the club in 1977.

Under Hammam, Wimbledon achieved four promotions in nine years, becoming a Football League First Division club in 1986 and winning the FA Cup in 1988.

In 1990, before Wimbledon had moved out of their Plough Lane ground to groundshare at Selhurst Park with local rivals Crystal Palace, Hammam bought out a covenant held on the ground by the Council that required it to be retained for sporting use. During the 1990s, Hammam failed in an attempt to relocate the club to Dublin, Ireland.

In 1997, Hammam sold 80% of his shares in Wimbledon to Bjørn Rune Gjelsten and Kjell Inge Røkke. He sold the remaining 20% to Gjelsten and Røkke in February 2000, three months before the club's relegation from the Premier League. In 2004, Wimbledon F.C. was relocated to Milton Keynes and rebranded as the MK Dons, with the newly formed AFC Wimbledon often considered the successor club to the original Wimbledon.

== Cardiff City ==
Hammam purchased control of Cardiff City F.C. at the end of 2000, where he picked up where he left off with Wimbledon. After taking over at Cardiff, Hammam controversially pledged to get the entire Welsh nation to support Cardiff by renaming the club "The Cardiff Celts" and changing the club colours to green, red and white.

At Cardiff he became a cult-hero with fans for taking part in their head-patting 'do the Ayatollah' chant. One such game saw him performing the celebration during an infamous 2–1 home win in the FA Cup against then-Premier League side Leeds United in 2002. This, along with other aspects of his behaviour during the match, were blamed for contributing to the subsequent violence between Leeds and Cardiff fans at the end of the match.

After failing to get the new stadium plans agreed by Cardiff Council due to concerns over financial security in 2006, Hammam agreed to a takeover by a consortium led by new chairman Peter Ridsdale and including local businessman Paul Guy. In March 2008, Cardiff City began a court case against financial backers Langston over the repayment of a loan believed to be worth around £31 million. During the hearing the barrister representing the club named Sam Hammam as the man they believe to be behind the company. No settlement was reached in the case.

In July 2013, following Cardiff City's promotion to the Premier League, it emerged that Malaysian businessman Vincent Tan, who had taken effective control of the club in 2010, was in advanced talks with Hammam – confirmed as Langston's spokesman – about repayment of the loan, then thought to be around £24 million. Four days later, on 18 July 2013, Tan announced that an "amicable resolution" had been reached between Cardiff City and Langston over the debt issue, with Sam Hammam becoming a life president of the club. Hammam confirmed this in an interview with the BBC on 24 July, requesting that fans of the club back the Malaysian owner. However, in March 2022, an out of court settlement was reached between Hammam and club owner Vincent Tan which saw this life presidency role relinquished and all ties severed with the football club; following a legal dispute reportedly concerning the terms and the conditions of the role.

== Controversy ==
Hammam has achieved a level of notoriety in British football for his unusual antics at matches, frequently walking around the pitchside during games, and his eccentric methods of publicising himself and his players. On at least one occasion he made a player eat sheep's testicles prior to signing with Cardiff City.

Business positions
Preceded by Steve Borley	Cardiff City F.C. chairman 2000–2006	Succeeded by Peter Ridsdale
