= List of Wimbledon F.C. seasons =

This amateur Wimbledon first team, pictured in 1919, was the first from the club to compete in the Athenian League, which it would do for two seasons before joining the Isthmian League in 1921.

Wimbledon Football Club was an English football club from Wimbledon, south-west London, amateur from 1889 to 1964 and professional thereafter. Founded in 1889 as Wimbledon Old Central Football Club,^{[A]} an amateur club playing in local league competitions, the club shortened its name to "Wimbledon" in 1905, entered the FA Amateur Cup for the first time in 1905–06 and joined the Spartan League in 1909. After going out of business a year later, Wimbledon immediately reformed and returned to local leagues in 1912, where the team stayed until the 1919–20 season when the club joined the Athenian League. Moving to the Isthmian League in 1921, Wimbledon won four league championships in six years during the 1930s and reached the FA Amateur Cup Final in 1935 before losing to Bishop Auckland after a replay. The club continued to be successful following the Second World War, again reaching the Amateur Cup Final in 1947 and finishing as runners-up in the Isthmian League in 1950 and 1952. After claiming a fourth Isthmian League crown in 1959, Wimbledon then took three successive championships from 1962 to 1964, as well as the 1963 FA Amateur Cup.

These achievements prompted the switch to professional football, which occurred in 1964, concurrently with the extension of membership from the Southern Football League. Wimbledon finished second twice out of the team's first four outings in this competition, before again winning three consecutive titles from 1975 to 1977. The club won election to The Football League after these successes, and thus entered the Fourth Division for the first time in 1977–78. Wimbledon took only ten seasons as a Football League club to reach England's top flight, winning promotion to the First Division for the 1986–87 season; Wimbledon then beat League champions Liverpool 1–0 in the 1988 FA Cup Final to achieve the feat of having won both the FA Cup and its amateur equivalent (as of 2009, only two other clubs – Old Carthusians and Royal Engineers AFC – had done this). Wimbledon remained in the top division until 2000, when the side was relegated. The club announced an unpopular relocation to Milton Keynes in 2001, which received permission a year later, causing the foundation of AFC Wimbledon by the majority of Wimbledon fans, who called it "the death of [their] club". The club subsequently relocated to Milton Keynes in September 2003, and rebranded itself as Milton Keynes Dons in 2004.

== Key ==
| Champions | Runners-up | Promoted | Relegated |

Top scorer and number of goals scored shown in bold when he was also top scorer for the division
Division shown in bold when it changes due to promotion, relegation or reorganisation
League results shown in italics for abandoned or wartime competitions

Key to league record

- P = Played
- W = Games won
- D = Games drawn
- L = Games lost
- F = Goals for
- A = Goals against
- Pts = Points
- Pos = Final position

Key to divisions

- Prem = FA Premier League
- Div 1 = Football League First Division
- Div 2 = Football League Second Division
- Div 3 = Football League Third Division
- Div 4 = Football League Fourth Division
- South P = Southern Football League Premier Division
- South 1 = Southern Football League First Division
- Isthmian = Isthmian League
- Athenian = Athenian League
- Utd Snr = United Senior League
- Metro = Metropolitan League
- Spartan A = Spartan League A Division
- W Sub'n = Western Suburban League
- Mid-Surrey = Mid-Surrey League
- S Sub'n = Southern Suburban League
- Clapham = Clapham League
- Herald = Herald League
- S London = South London League

Key to rounds

- Grp = Group stage
- ExtPre = Extra Preliminary round
- Pre = Preliminary round
- QR1 = Qualifying round 1
- QR2 = Qualifying round 2
- QR3 = Qualifying round 3
- QR4 = Qualifying round 4
- QR5 = Qualifying round 5
- QR6 = Qualifying round 6
- R1 = Round 1
- R2 = Round 2
- R3 = Round 3
- R4 = Round 4
- R5 = Round 5
- R6 = Round 6
- QF = Quarter-finals
- SF = Semi-finals
- RU = Runners-up
- W = Winners
- S = Southern sector

Key to goalscorers

- # = Number of goals scored
- ^{†} Players with this background and symbol in the "Name" column scored a record number of goals for the club during the corresponding season.
- ^{‡} Players with this background and symbol in the "Name" equalled the record.

== Seasons ==
| Season | League | | | | | | | | | FA Cup | League Cup^{[B]} | Other competitions | | Top scorer^{[C]} | |
| Season | Division | P | W | D | L | F | A | Pts | Pos | FA Cup | League Cup^{[B]} | Other competitions | | Name | # |
|---|---|---|---|---|---|---|---|---|---|---|---|---|---|---|---|
| 1889–90^{[D]} | None | 2 | 2 | 0 | 0 | 3 | 1 | | | | | — | — | | |
| 1890–91 | None | 23 | 14 | 6 | 3 | 50 | 13 | | | | | — | — | | |
| 1891–92 | None | | | | | | | | | | | — | — | | |
| 1892–93 | None | 8 | 4 | 1 | 3 | 15 | 11 | | | | | Herald Cup | R1 | | |
| 1893–94 | None | 8 | 6 | 2 | 0 | 20 | 4 | | | | | — | — | | |
| 1894–95 | S London^{[E]} | 15 | 7 | 4 | 4 | | | | | | | L-n Junior Cup | R3 | | |
| 1894–95 | Friendlies | 10 | 6 | 2 | 2 | | | | | | | L-n Junior Cup | R3 | | |
| 1895–96 | Clapham^{[F]} | 7 | 6 | 1 | 0 | | | | | | | S.W. Cup | R2 | | |
| 1895–96 | Herald^{[G]} | 12 | 9 | 2 | 1 | | | | | | | S.W. Cup | R2 | | |
| 1895–96 | Friendlies | 9 | 5 | 0 | 4 | | | | | | | S.W. Cup | R2 | | |
| 1896–97 | Clapham | | | | | | | | | | | — | — | | |
| 1896–97 | Herald | | | | | | | | | | | — | — | | |
| 1897–98 | Clapham | | | | | | | | | | | — | — | | |
| 1898–99 | Clapham | | | | | | | | | | | — | — | | |
| 1899–1900 | Clapham | | | | | | | | | | | — | — | | |
| 1900–01 | Clapham | | | | | | | | | | | — | — | | |
| 1901–02 | Clapham | | | | | | | | | | | — | — | | |
| 1902–03 | S Sub'n^{[H]} | | | | | | | | | | | — | — | | |
| 1902–03 | Clapham | | | | | | | | | | | — | — | | |
| 1903–04 | S Sub'n | | | | | | | | | | | — | — | | |
| 1903–04 | Clapham | | | | | | | | | | | — | — | | |
| 1904–05 | S Suburban | | | | | | | | | | | — | — | | |
| 1904–05 | Clapham | | | | | | | | | | | — | — | | |
| 1905–06^{[I]} | S Sub'n | | | | | | | | | | | FA Amateur Cup | R2 | | |
| 1905–06^{[I]} | Mid-Surrey^{[J]} | | | | | | | | | | | FA Amateur Cup | R2 | | |
| 1906–07 | S Sub'n | | | | | | | | | FA Amateur Cup | | QR2 | | | |
| 1907–08 | S Sub'n | | | | | | | | | FA Amateur Cup | | QR1 | | | |
| 1908–09 | W Sub'n^{[K]} | | | | | | | | | QR1 | | FA Amateur Cup | QR1 | | |
| 1909–10 | Spartan A^{[L]} | 12 | 3 | 2 | 7 | 17 | 31 | 8 | 6th | QR1 | | FA Amateur Cup | R2 | | |
| 1909–10 | S Sub'n^{[M]} | | | | | | | | | QR1 | | FA Amateur Cup | R2 | | |
| 1910–11^{[N]} | None | | | | | | | | | | | — | — | | |
| 1911–12^{[O]} | None | | | | | | | | | | | — | — | | |
| 1912–13^{[P]} | S Sub'n^{[Q]} | | | | | | | | | QR2 | | — | — | | |
| 1913–14 | S Sub'n | | | | | | | | | Pre | | FA Amateur Cup | R1 | | |
| 1914–15 | S Sub'n^{[R]} | | | | | | | | | ExtPre | FA Amateur Cup | R1 | | | |
| 1914–15 | Metro^{[R]} | | | | | | | | | ExtPre | FA Amateur Cup | R1 | | | |
The Football League, FA Cup and FA Amateur Cup were suspended between 1915 and 1919 due to the First World War.
| 1918–19 | Utd Snr^{[S]} | no information available | | | | | | | | n/a | | — | — | | |
| 1919–20 | Athenian^{[T]} | 22 | 8 | 5 | 9 | 44 | 43 | 21 | 7th | QR4 | | FA Amateur Cup | R5 | | |
| 1920–21 | Athenian | 42 | 16 | 12 | 14 | 61 | 56 | 44 | 2nd | QR2 | | FA Amateur Cup | QF | | |
| 1921–22 | Isthmian^{[U]} | 26 | 7 | 4 | 15 | 52 | 56 | 18 | 13th | QR4 | | FA Amateur Cup | R1 | | |
| 1922–23 | Isthmian | 26 | 10 | 2 | 14 | 49 | 50 | 22 | 11th | QR4 | | FA Amateur Cup | R5 | H. Mann^{†} | 26 |
| 1923–24 | Isthmian | 26 | 8 | 4 | 14 | 43 | 62 | 20 | 10th | | | FA Amateur Cup | R1 | Stanley Darvill | 17 |
| 1924–25 | Isthmian | 26 | 10 | 2 | 14 | 50 | 54 | 22 | 11th | | | FA Amateur Cup | R1 | Doc Dowden | 16 |
| 1925–26 | Isthmian | 26 | 9 | 1 | 16 | 61 | 77 | 19 | 12th | QR3 | | FA Amateur Cup | QR2 | R. Brown | 21 |
| 1926–27 | Isthmian | 26 | 15 | 3 | 8 | 72 | 45 | 33 | 3rd | QR2 | | FA Amateur Cup | R1 | Doc Dowden^{†} | 32 |
| 1927–28 | Isthmian | 26 | 12 | 3 | 11 | 57 | 48 | 27 | 6th | QR4 | | FA Amateur Cup | R3 | Doc Dowden^{†} | 34 |
| 1928–29 | Isthmian | 26 | 9 | 10 | 7 | 66 | 54 | 28 | 4th | QR2 | | FA Amateur Cup | R1 | Doc Dowden^{†} | 42 |
| 1929–30 | Isthmian | 26 | 11 | 2 | 13 | 64 | 66 | 24 | 6th | R1 | | FA Amateur Cup | SF | Doc Dowden^{†} | 48 |
| 1930–31 | Isthmian | 26 | 18 | 6 | 2 | 69 | 37 | 42 | 1st | R1 | | FA Amateur Cup | R3 | Doc Dowden | 30 |
| 1931–32 | Isthmian | 26 | 17 | 2 | 7 | 60 | 35 | 36 | 1st | R1 | | FA Amateur Cup | QF | Doc Dowden | 11 |
| 1932–33 | Isthmian | 26 | 8 | 5 | 13 | 55 | 67 | 21 | 13th | QR4 | | FA Amateur Cup | R2 | Doc Dowden | 19 |
| 1933–34 | Isthmian | 26 | 13 | 7 | 6 | 63 | 35 | 33 | 3rd | QR4 | | FA Amateur Cup | R3 | | |
| 1934–35 | Isthmian | 26 | 14 | 7 | 5 | 63 | 30 | 35 | 1st | R2 | | FA Amateur Cup | RU^{[V]} | | |
| 1935–36 | Isthmian | 26 | 19 | 2 | 5 | 82 | 29 | 40 | 1st | QR4 | | FA Amateur Cup | R1 | | |
| 1936–37 | Isthmian | 26 | 9 | 7 | 10 | 52 | 53 | 25 | 7th | QR4 | | FA Amateur Cup | R1 | | |
| 1937–38 | Isthmian | 26 | 10 | 3 | 13 | 62 | 49 | 23 | 9th | QR4 | | FA Amateur Cup | R1 | | |
| 1938–39 | Isthmian | 26 | 14 | 3 | 9 | 88 | 56 | 31 | 5th | QR1 | | FA Amateur Cup | R1 | | |
| 1939–40^{[W]} | Isthmian | 1 | 0 | 0 | 1 | 2 | 3 | 0 | – | n/a | | — | — | | |
The Isthmian League and FA Cup were suspended between 1939 and 1945 due to the Second World War.
| 1945–46 | Isthmian | 26 | 7 | 6 | 13 | 52 | 72 | 20 | 10th | QR1 | | FA Amateur Cup | R3 | | |
| 1946–47 | Isthmian | 26 | 10 | 5 | 11 | 68 | 64 | 25 | 8th | QR2 | | FA Amateur Cup | RU^{[X]} | Pat Edelston | 31 |
| 1947–48 | Isthmian | 26 | 13 | 6 | 7 | 66 | 40 | 32 | 5th | R1 | | FA Amateur Cup | R2 | Ron Head | 19 |
| 1948–49 | Isthmian | 26 | 15 | 4 | 7 | 64 | 41 | 34 | 3rd | QR4 | | FA Amateur Cup | R2 | Harry Stannard | 33 |
| 1949–50 | Isthmian | 26 | 18 | 2 | 6 | 72 | 51 | 38 | 2nd | QR1 | | FA Amateur Cup | R3 | Harry Stannard | 25 |
| 1950–51 | Isthmian | 26 | 13 | 5 | 8 | 58 | 39 | 31 | 4th | QR1 | | FA Amateur Cup | QF | Freddie Gauntlett; Harry Stannard | 29 |
| 1951–52 | Isthmian | 26 | 16 | 3 | 7 | 65 | 44 | 35 | 2nd | Pre | | FA Amateur Cup | QF | Harry Stannard | 31 |
| 1952–53 | Isthmian | 28 | 14 | 5 | 9 | 68 | 37 | 33 | 4th | R1 | | FA Amateur Cup | R1 | Harry Stannard | 31 |
| 1953–54 | Isthmian | 28 | 7 | 8 | 13 | 43 | 59 | 22 | 14th | QR1 | | FA Amateur Cup | R2 | Freddie Gauntlett; Harry Stannard | 12 |
| 1954–55 | Isthmian | 28 | 10 | 2 | 16 | 48 | 62 | 22 | 12th | QR1 | | FA Amateur Cup | QF | Jeff Darey | 18 |
| 1955–56 | Isthmian | 28 | 12 | 2 | 14 | 51 | 62 | 26 | 11th | QR1 | | FA Amateur Cup | R2 | Joe Wallis | 23 |
| 1956–57 | Isthmian | 30 | 10 | 5 | 15 | 47 | 66 | 25 | 13th | Pre | | FA Amateur Cup | R2 | Joe Wallis | 26 |
| 1957–58 | Isthmian | 30 | 15 | 2 | 13 | 64 | 66 | 32 | 7th | Pre | | FA Amateur Cup | R1 | Brian Martin | 19 |
| 1958–59 | Isthmian | 30 | 22 | 3 | 5 | 91 | 38 | 47 | 1st | Pre | | FA Amateur Cup | R1 | Eddie Reynolds | 37 |
| 1959–60 | Isthmian | 30 | 18 | 3 | 9 | 66 | 36 | 39 | 3rd | QR2 | | FA Amateur Cup | R2 | Eddie Reynolds | 39 |
| 1960–61 | Isthmian | 30 | 18 | 6 | 6 | 72 | 43 | 42 | 3rd | QR2 | | FA Amateur Cup | QF | Eddie Reynolds | 47 |
| 1961–62 | Isthmian | 30 | 19 | 6 | 5 | 68 | 24 | 44 | 1st | QR2 | | FA Amateur Cup | QF | Eddie Reynolds^{†} | 50 |
| 1962–63 | Isthmian | 30 | 19 | 8 | 3 | 84 | 33 | 46 | 1st | R2 | | FA Amateur Cup | W^{[Y]} | Eddie Reynolds^{†} | 53 |
| 1963–64 | Isthmian | 38 | 27 | 6 | 5 | 87 | 44 | 60 | 1st | R2 | | FA Amateur Cup | R3 | Eddie Reynolds | 35 |
| 1964–65^{[Z]} | South 1^{[AA]} | 42 | 24 | 13 | 5 | 108 | 52 | 61 | 2nd | QR4 | | — | — | Eddie Reynolds^{‡} | 53 |
| 1965–66 | South P | 42 | 20 | 10 | 12 | 80 | 47 | 50 | 5th | R2 | | — | — | Ian Cooke | 29 |
| 1966–67 | South P | 42 | 19 | 11 | 12 | 88 | 60 | 49 | 4th | R1 | | — | — | Ian Cooke | 37 |
| 1967–68 | South P | 42 | 24 | 7 | 11 | 85 | 47 | 55 | 2nd | R2 | | — | — | Ian Cooke | 32 |
| 1968–69 | South P | 42 | 21 | 12 | 9 | 66 | 48 | 54 | 3rd | QR4 | | — | — | Eddie Bailham | 24 |
| 1969–70 | South P | 42 | 19 | 12 | 11 | 64 | 52 | 50 | 5th | R1 | | FA Trophy | R1 | Ian Cooke | 29 |
| 1970–71 | South P | 42 | 20 | 8 | 14 | 72 | 54 | 48 | 8th | R1 | | FA Trophy | R3 | Ian Cooke | 37 |
| 1971–72 | South P | 42 | 19 | 7 | 16 | 75 | 64 | 45 | 10th | QR4 | | FA Trophy | R1 | Ian Cooke | 21 |
| 1972–73 | South P | 42 | 14 | 14 | 14 | 50 | 50 | 42 | 12th | QR3 | | FA Trophy | R3 | Ian Cooke | 20 |
| 1973–74 | South P | 42 | 15 | 11 | 16 | 50 | 56 | 41 | 12th | R1 | | FA Trophy | R1 | Ian Cooke | 24 |
| 1974–75 | South P | 42 | 25 | 7 | 10 | 63 | 33 | 57 | 1st | R4 | | FA Trophy | QF | Roger Connell | 31 |
| 1975–76 | South P | 42 | 26 | 10 | 6 | 74 | 29 | 62 | 1st | R2 | | FA Trophy | R2 | Roger Connell | 20 |
| 1976–77 | South P | 42 | 28 | 7 | 7 | 64 | 22 | 63 | 1st | R3 | | FA Trophy | R3 | Roger Connell; Billy Holmes | 21 |
| 1977–78 | Div 4^{[AB]} | 46 | 14 | 16 | 16 | 66 | 67 | 44 | 13th | R1 | R2 | — | — | Roger Connell | 15 |
| 1978–79 | Div 4 | 46 | 25 | 11 | 10 | 78 | 46 | 61 | 3rd | R3 | R2 | — | — | Alan Cork | 25 |
| 1979–80 | Div 3 | 46 | 10 | 14 | 22 | 52 | 81 | 34 | 24th | R2 | R4 | — | — | John Leslie | 17 |
| 1980–81 | Div 4 | 46 | 23 | 9 | 14 | 64 | 46 | 55 | 4th | R4 | R2 | — | — | Alan Cork | 26 |
| 1981–82 | Div 3 | 46 | 14 | 11 | 21 | 61 | 75 | 53 | 21st | R2 | R1 | — | — | Francis Joseph | 13 |
| 1982–83 | Div 4 | 46 | 29 | 11 | 6 | 96 | 45 | 98 | 1st | R1 | R1 | — | — | John Leslie | 25 |
| 1983–84 | Div 3 | 46 | 26 | 9 | 11 | 97 | 76 | 87 | 2nd | R2 | R4 | Associate Members' Cup | R1S | Alan Cork | 33 |
| 1984–85 | Div 2 | 42 | 16 | 10 | 16 | 71 | 75 | 58 | 12th | R5 | R1 | — | — | Stewart Evans | 16 |
| 1985–86 | Div 2 | 42 | 21 | 13 | 8 | 58 | 37 | 76 | 3rd | R3 | R3 | — | — | Alan Cork | 15 |
| 1986–87 | Div 1 | 42 | 19 | 9 | 14 | 57 | 50 | 66 | 6th | QF | R2 | Full Members Cup | R2 | John Fashanu | 14 |
| 1987–88 | Div 1 | 40 | 14 | 15 | 11 | 58 | 47 | 57 | 7th | W^{[AC]} | R4 | Full Members Cup | R3 | John Fashanu | 20 |
| 1988–89 | Div 1 | 38 | 14 | 9 | 15 | 50 | 46 | 51 | 12th | QF | R4 | FA Charity Shield | RU^{[AD]} | John Fashanu | 16 |
| 1988–89 | Div 1 | 38 | 14 | 9 | 15 | 50 | 46 | 51 | 12th | QF | R4 | Full Members Cup | QF | John Fashanu | 16 |
| 1988–89 | Div 1 | 38 | 14 | 9 | 15 | 50 | 46 | 51 | 12th | QF | R4 | Mercantile Credit Centenary Trophy | QF | John Fashanu | 16 |
| 1989–90 | Div 1 | 38 | 13 | 16 | 9 | 47 | 40 | 55 | 8th | R3 | R4 | Full Members Cup | R3S | John Fashanu | 13 |
| 1990–91 | Div 1 | 38 | 14 | 14 | 10 | 53 | 46 | 56 | 7th | R4 | R2 | Full Members Cup | R2S | John Fashanu | 20 |
| 1991–92 | Div 1 | 42 | 13 | 14 | 15 | 53 | 53 | 53 | 13th | R3 | R2 | Full Members Cup | R2S | John Fashanu | 20 |
| 1992–93 | Prem^{[AE]} | 42 | 14 | 12 | 16 | 56 | 55 | 54 | 12th | R5 | R3 | — | — | Dean Holdsworth | 19 |
| 1993–94 | Prem | 42 | 18 | 11 | 13 | 56 | 53 | 65 | 6th | R5 | QF | — | — | Dean Holdsworth | 24 |
| 1994–95 | Prem | 42 | 15 | 11 | 16 | 48 | 65 | 56 | 9th | R5 | R3 | — | — | Efan Ekoku | 9 |
| 1995–96 | Prem | 38 | 10 | 11 | 17 | 55 | 70 | 41 | 14th | QF | R2 | UEFA Intertoto Cup | Grp | Efan Ekoku; Dean Holdsworth | 16 |
| 1996–97 | Prem | 38 | 15 | 11 | 12 | 49 | 64 | 56 | 8th | SF | SF | — | — | Marcus Gayle | 13 |
| 1997–98 | Prem | 38 | 10 | 14 | 14 | 34 | 46 | 44 | 15th | R5 | R3 | — | — | Jason Euell | 8 |
| 1998–99 | Prem | 38 | 10 | 12 | 16 | 40 | 63 | 42 | 16th | R4 | SF | — | — | Marcus Gayle | 11 |
| 1999–2000 | Prem | 38 | 7 | 12 | 19 | 46 | 74 | 33 | 18th | R4 | QF | — | — | Carl Cort | 15 |
| 2000–01 | Div 1 | 46 | 17 | 18 | 11 | 71 | 50 | 69 | 8th | R5 | R4 | — | — | Jason Euell | 20 |
| 2001–02 | Div 1 | 46 | 18 | 13 | 15 | 63 | 57 | 67 | 9th | R3 | R1 | — | — | David Connolly | 18 |
At the end of the 2001–02 season, the club was granted permission to relocate to Milton Keynes. Soon after, most supporters split from the side to form AFC Wimbledon. For a statistical history of this club, see List of AFC Wimbledon seasons.
| 2002–03 | Div 1 | 46 | 18 | 11 | 17 | 76 | 73 | 65 | 10th | R4 | R3 | — | — | David Connolly; Neil Shipperley | 24 |
| 2003–04^{[AF]} | Div 1 | 46 | 8 | 5 | 33 | 41 | 89 | 29 | 24th | R4 | R1 | — | — | Patrick Agyemang | 7 |
Wimbledon Football Club was rebranded as "Milton Keynes Dons" before the start of the 2004–05 season. Milton Keynes Dons renounced its claim to the history of Wimbledon F.C. in 2007. For a statistical history of this club, see List of Milton Keynes Dons F.C. seasons.

== Footnotes ==
A. The club itself was called "Wimbledon Old Central Football Club", while the team was collectively referred to as "Wimbledon Old Centrals".
B. The League Cup competition started in the 1960–61 season. Wimbledon could not enter the League Cup until the club was elected to The Football League, something which occurred before the 1977–78 season.
C. Includes goals scored in the Spartan League, Athenian League, Isthmian League, Southern League, The Football League, FA Cup, Football League Cup, Full Members Cup, Associate Members' Cup, FA Trophy, FA Amateur Cup and UEFA Intertoto Cup
D. Wimbledon Old Central Football Club was founded in 1889.
E. Wimbledon Old Centrals competed in the South London League during the 1894–95 season.
F. Wimbledon Old Centrals entered the Clapham League for the 1895–96 season, and remained in the competition until 1905.
G. Wimbledon Old Centrals entered a team into the Herald League for two seasons, starting in the 1895–96 season.
H. Wimbledon Old Centrals moved to the Southern Suburban League before the 1902–03 campaign, while continuing to enter a team into the Clapham League.
I. The club shortened its name to "Wimbledon" in 1905.
J. The club entered a team into the Mid-Surrey League for one season – 1905–06.
K. Wimbledon spent the 1908–09 season competing in the Western Suburban League.
L. Wimbledon competed in the Spartan League during the 1909–10 season.
M. Wimbledon returned to the Southern Suburban League for the 1909–10 season.
N. The club disbanded and immediately reformed in 1910, retaining the name "Wimbledon".

O. The club retitled itself "Wimbledon Borough" in 1911.
P. After only a year, "Borough" was dropped from the name in 1912.
Q. The club returned to the Southern Suburban League before the 1912–13 season.
R. The club contested the Metropolitan League during 1914–15, after the Southern Suburban League was abandoned after one match.
S. During the First World War's final year, Wimbledon entered the United Senior League.
T. Wimbledon entered the Athenian League before the 1919–20 season.
U. The club moved to the Isthmian League for the 1921–22 season.
V. Drew 0–0 with Bishop Auckland; lost replay 2–1
W. The 1939–40 season was abandoned in September and all results annulled, after one match had been played.
X. Lost 2–1 to Leytonstone
Y. Defeated Sutton United 4–2
Z. The club turned professional in 1964.
AA. Newly-professional Wimbledon joined the Southern Football League before the 1964–65 season.
AB. The team was elected to The Football League for the 1977–78 season.
AC. Wimbledon defeated Liverpool 1–0. This would normally have resulted in Wimbledon's qualification for the 1988–89 UEFA Cup Winners' Cup, but UEFA's 1985–1991 ban on the participation of English clubs prevented this.
AD. Lost 2–1 to Liverpool
AE. Upon its formation for the 1992–93 season, the FA Premier League became the top tier of English football; the First, Second and Third Divisions then became the second, third and fourth tiers, respectively.
AF. The side played its first match at the National Hockey Stadium in Milton Keynes on 27 September 2003, after playing the season's first four league home matches at Selhurst Park.
