= List of AFC Wimbledon seasons =

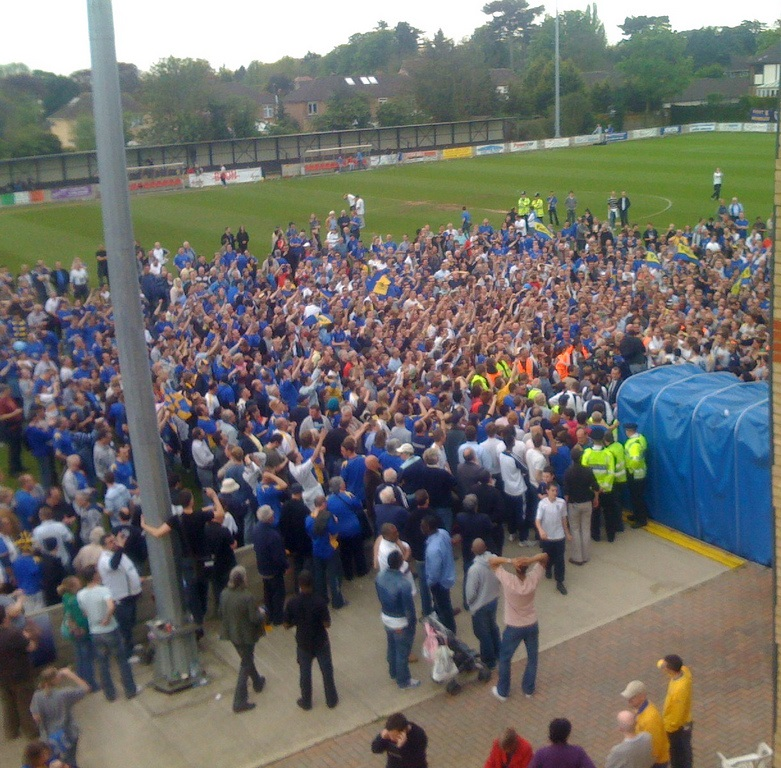
AFC Wimbledon fans and players celebrating promotion to the Conference South after beating Staines Town 2–1 in the Isthmian League Premier Division Play-off Final at the end of the 2007–08 season.

AFC Wimbledon is an English professional association football club, currently based in Merton, Greater London. The club was formed on 30 May 2002 by supporters of Wimbledon Football Club, led by Kris Stewart, Marc Jones and Trevor Williams who strongly opposed the decision of an independent commission appointed by The Football Association to allow the relocation of Wimbledon F.C. to Milton Keynes, to be subsequently renamed as Milton Keynes Dons.

AFC Wimbledon was accepted into the Premier Division of the Combined Counties League for the 2002–03 season. The club's average home attendance at league fixtures for their first season exceeded 3,000 – higher than the average attendance in the same season of Wimbledon F.C., who were still playing in the First Division (now the Football League Championship). AFC Wimbledon have also set a record for the longest run of unbeaten league games at any level of men's semi-professional or professional football in the United Kingdom. The team remained unbeaten for 78 league matches between 22 February 2003 (a 2–0 defeat at home to Withdean 2000) and 4 December 2004 (a 2–0 defeat at Cray Wanderers).

The club went on to achieve 5 promotions in 9 seasons, ensuring that they were the first club to be formed in the 21st century to achieve Football League status, and making them the youngest of the 72 Football League clubs. On 30 May 2016, AFC Wimbledon achieved their 6th promotion to Football League One after victory in the 2016 Football League Two play-off final, exactly 14 years to the day since the club's formation.

== Key ==
The Division is shown in italics when it changes due to promotion, relegation or league reorganisation.

Champions ↑	Runners-up	Automatic Promotion †	Promotion via Play-offs ‡	Relegated

Key to league record

- P = Games played
- W = Games won
- D = Games drawn
- L = Games lost
- F = Goals for
- A = Goals against
- Pts = Points
- Pos = Final league position

Key to rounds

- QR2 = Qualifying round 2
- QR3 = Qualifying round 3
- QR4 = Qualifying round 4
- Prelim = Preliminary round
- R1 = Round 1
- R1S = Round 1 Southern Section
- R2 = Round 2
- R3 = Round 3
- R4 = Round 4
- R5 = Round 5
- R6 = Round 6
- QF = Quarter-finals
- SF = Semi-finals
- RU = Runners-up
- W = Winners
- N/A = Did not compete

Key to goalscorers

- = Number of league goals scored

== Seasons ==
Season	League									FA Cup	Other competitions		Top scorer		Average home attendance	References
Season	Division	P	W	D	L	F	A	Pts	Pos	FA Cup	Other competitions		Name	Goal	Average home attendance	References
2002–03	Combined Counties League; Premier Division	46	36	3	7	125	46	111	3rd	N/A	London Senior Cup	R4	Kevin Cooper	37	3,003	
2002–03	Combined Counties League; Premier Division	46	36	3	7	125	46	111	3rd	N/A	Combined Counties League Premier Challenge Cup	R2	Kevin Cooper	37	3,003	
2003–04	Combined Counties League; Premier Division	46	42	4	0	180	32	130	1st ↑ Champions	N/A	FA Vase	R6	Kevin Cooper	53	2,606	
2003–04	Combined Counties League; Premier Division	46	42	4	0	180	32	130	1st ↑ Champions	N/A	London Senior Cup	R1	Kevin Cooper	53	2,606	
2003–04	Combined Counties League; Premier Division	46	42	4	0	180	32	130	1st ↑ Champions	N/A	Surrey Senior Cup	R3	Kevin Cooper	53	2,606	
2003–04	Combined Counties League; Premier Division	46	42	4	0	180	32	130	1st ↑ Champions	N/A	Combined Counties League Premier Challenge Cup	W	Kevin Cooper	53	2,606	
2004–05	Isthmian League; Division One	42	29	10	3	91	33	97	1st ↑ Champions	QR3	FA Trophy	R1	Richard Butler	24	2,858	
2004–05	Isthmian League; Division One	42	29	10	3	91	33	97	1st ↑ Champions	QR3	London Senior Cup	R4	Richard Butler	24	2,858	
2004–05	Isthmian League; Division One	42	29	10	3	91	33	97	1st ↑ Champions	QR3	Surrey Senior Cup	W	Richard Butler	24	2,858	
2004–05	Isthmian League; Division One	42	29	10	3	91	33	97	1st ↑ Champions	QR3	Isthmian League Cup	QF	Richard Butler	24	2,858	
2005–06	Isthmian League; Premier Division	42	22	11	9	67	36	77	4th^{[A]}	QR2	FA Trophy	R1	Shane Smeltz	19	2,706	
2005–06	Isthmian League; Premier Division	42	22	11	9	67	36	77	4th^{[A]}	QR2	London Senior Cup	R4	Shane Smeltz	19	2,706	
2005–06	Isthmian League; Premier Division	42	22	11	9	67	36	77	4th^{[A]}	QR2	Surrey Senior Cup	RU	Shane Smeltz	19	2,706	
2005–06	Isthmian League; Premier Division	42	22	11	9	67	36	77	4th^{[A]}	QR2	Isthmian League Cup	QF	Shane Smeltz	19	2,706	
2006–07	Isthmian League; Premier Division	42	21	15	6	76	37	75^{[B]}	5th^{[C]}	QR4	FA Trophy	R2^{[B]}	Roscoe Dsane	17	2,512	
2006–07	Isthmian League; Premier Division	42	21	15	6	76	37	75^{[B]}	5th^{[C]}	QR4	London Senior Cup	R1	Roscoe Dsane	17	2,512	
2006–07	Isthmian League; Premier Division	42	21	15	6	76	37	75^{[B]}	5th^{[C]}	QR4	Surrey Senior Cup	R2^{[B]}	Roscoe Dsane	17	2,512	
2006–07	Isthmian League; Premier Division	42	21	15	6	76	37	75^{[B]}	5th^{[C]}	QR4	Isthmian League Cup	R4	Roscoe Dsane	17	2,512	
2007–08	Isthmian League; Premier Division	42	22	9	11	81	47	75	3rd^{[D]} Promoted via Play-offs‡	QR3	FA Trophy	R3	Steven Ferguson	10	2,603	
2007–08	Isthmian League; Premier Division	42	22	9	11	81	47	75	3rd^{[D]} Promoted via Play-offs‡	QR3	London Senior Cup	QF	Steven Ferguson	10	2,603	
2007–08	Isthmian League; Premier Division	42	22	9	11	81	47	75	3rd^{[D]} Promoted via Play-offs‡	QR3	Surrey Senior Cup	R2	Steven Ferguson	10	2,603	
2007–08	Isthmian League; Premier Division	42	22	9	11	81	47	75	3rd^{[D]} Promoted via Play-offs‡	QR3	Isthmian League Cup	R2	Steven Ferguson	10	2,603	
2008–09	Conference; South	42	26	10	6	86	36	88	1st ↑ Champions	R1	FA Trophy	R1	Jon Main	33	3,219	
2008–09	Conference; South	42	26	10	6	86	36	88	1st ↑ Champions	R1	Conference League Cup	R1S	Jon Main	33	3,219	
2008–09	Conference; South	42	26	10	6	86	36	88	1st ↑ Champions	R1	London Senior Cup	R1	Jon Main	33	3,219	
2008–09	Conference; South	42	26	10	6	86	36	88	1st ↑ Champions	R1	Surrey Senior Cup	R3	Jon Main	33	3,219	
2009–10	Conference; National	44	18	10	16	61	47	64	8th	R1	FA Trophy	R3	Danny Kedwell	21	3,535	
2009–10	Conference; National	44	18	10	16	61	47	64	8th	R1	London Senior Cup	RU	Danny Kedwell	21	3,535	
2009–10	Conference; National	44	18	10	16	61	47	64	8th	R1	Surrey Senior Cup	QF	Danny Kedwell	21	3,535	
2010–11	Conference; National	46	27	9	10	83	47	90	2nd^{[E]} Promoted via Play-offs‡	R2	FA Trophy	R2	Danny Kedwell	23	3,486	
2010–11	Conference; National	46	27	9	10	83	47	90	2nd^{[E]} Promoted via Play-offs‡	R2	London Senior Cup	SF	Danny Kedwell	23	3,486	
2010–11	Conference; National	46	27	9	10	83	47	90	2nd^{[E]} Promoted via Play-offs‡	R2	Surrey Senior Cup	R2	Danny Kedwell	23	3,486	
2011–12	Football League; Two	46	15	9	22	62	78	54	16th	R2	Football League Cup	Prelim	Jack Midson	18	4,295	
2011–12	Football League; Two	46	15	9	22	62	78	54	16th	R2	Football League Trophy	R3	Jack Midson	18	4,295	
2011–12	Football League; Two	46	15	9	22	62	78	54	16th	R2	London Senior Cup	SF	Jack Midson	18	4,295	
2011–12	Football League; Two	46	15	9	22	62	78	54	16th	R2	Surrey Senior Cup	QF	Jack Midson	18	4,295	
2012–13	Football League; Two	46	14	11	21	54	76	53	20th	R2	Football League Cup	R1	Jack Midson	13	4,060	
2012–13	Football League; Two	46	14	11	21	54	76	53	20th	R2	Football League Trophy	R1	Jack Midson	13	4,060	
2012–13	Football League; Two	46	14	11	21	54	76	53	20th	R2	London Senior Cup	W	Jack Midson	13	4,060	
2012–13	Football League; Two	46	14	11	21	54	76	53	20th	R2	Surrey Senior Cup	SF	Jack Midson	13	4,060	
2013–14	Football League; Two	46	14	14	18	49	57	53 ^{[F]}	20th	R1	Football League Cup	R1	Michael Smith	9	4,135	
2013–14	Football League; Two	46	14	14	18	49	57	53 ^{[F]}	20th	R1	Football League Trophy	R1	Michael Smith	9	4,135	
2013–14	Football League; Two	46	14	14	18	49	57	53 ^{[F]}	20th	R1	London Senior Cup	W	Michael Smith	9	4,135	
2013–14	Football League; Two	46	14	14	18	49	57	53 ^{[F]}	20th	R1	Surrey Senior Cup	R2	Michael Smith	9	4,135	
2014–15	Football League; Two	46	13	11	22	42	63	50	15th	R3	Football League Cup	R1	Adebayo Akinfenwa	15	4,073	
2014–15	Football League; Two	46	13	11	22	42	63	50	15th	R3	Football League Trophy	R3	Adebayo Akinfenwa	15	4,073	
2014–15	Football League; Two	46	13	11	22	42	63	50	15th	R3	London Senior Cup	R1	Adebayo Akinfenwa	15	4,073	
2014–15	Football League; Two	46	13	11	22	42	63	50	15th	R3	Surrey Senior Cup	N/A	Adebayo Akinfenwa	15	4,073	
2015–16	Football League; Two	46	21	12	13	64	50	75	7th^{[G]} Promoted via Play-offs‡	R1	Football League Cup	R1	Lyle Taylor	20	4,138	
2015–16	Football League; Two	46	21	12	13	64	50	75	7th^{[G]} Promoted via Play-offs‡	R1	Football League Trophy	R1	Lyle Taylor	20	4,138	
2015–16	Football League; Two	46	21	12	13	64	50	75	7th^{[G]} Promoted via Play-offs‡	R1	London Senior Cup	R2	Lyle Taylor	20	4,138	
2015–16	Football League; Two	46	21	12	13	64	50	75	7th^{[G]} Promoted via Play-offs‡	R1	Surrey Senior Cup	N/A	Lyle Taylor	20	4,138	
2016–17	EFL League; One	46	13	18	15	52	55	57	15th	R3	Football League Cup	R1	Lyle Taylor	14	4,477	
2016–17	EFL League; One	46	13	18	15	52	55	57	15th	R3	EFL Trophy	R2	Lyle Taylor	14	4,477	
2016–17	EFL League; One	46	13	18	15	52	55	57	15th	R3	London Senior Cup	QF	Lyle Taylor	14	4,477	
2016–17	EFL League; One	46	13	18	15	52	55	57	15th	R3	Surrey Senior Cup	N/A	Lyle Taylor	14	4,477	
2017–18	EFL League; One	46	13	14	19	47	58	53	18th	R3	EFL Cup	R1	Lyle Taylor	14	4,325	
2017–18	EFL League; One	46	13	14	19	47	58	53	18th	R3	EFL Trophy	R2	Lyle Taylor	14	4,325	
2017–18	EFL League; One	46	13	14	19	47	58	53	18th	R3	London Senior Cup	R2	Lyle Taylor	14	4,325	
2017–18	EFL League; One	46	13	14	19	47	58	53	18th	R3	Surrey Senior Cup	N/A	Lyle Taylor	14	4,325	
2018–19	EFL League; One	46	13	11	22	42	63	50	20th	R5	EFL Cup	R2	Joe Pigott	15	4,297	
2018–19	EFL League; One	46	13	11	22	42	63	50	20th	R5	EFL Trophy	R2	Joe Pigott	15	4,297	
2018–19	EFL League; One	46	13	11	22	42	63	50	20th	R5	London Senior Cup	N/A	Joe Pigott	15	4,297	
2018–19	EFL League; One	46	13	11	22	42	63	50	20th	R5	Surrey Senior Cup	N/A	Joe Pigott	15	4,297	
2019–20	EFL League; One	35	8	11	16	39	52	35	20th^{[H]}	R1	EFL Cup	R1	Marcus Forss	11	4,310	
2019–20	EFL League; One	35	8	11	16	39	52	35	20th^{[H]}	R1	EFL Trophy	Group Stage	Marcus Forss	11	4,310	
2019–20	EFL League; One	35	8	11	16	39	52	35	20th^{[H]}	R1	London Senior Cup	N/A	Marcus Forss	11	4,310	
2019–20	EFL League; One	35	8	11	16	39	52	35	20th^{[H]}	R1	Surrey Senior Cup	N/A	Marcus Forss	11	4,310	
2020–21	EFL League; One	46	12	15	19	54	70	51	19th	R2	EFL Cup	R1	Joe Pigott	21	N/A	
2020–21	EFL League; One	46	12	15	19	54	70	51	19th	R2	EFL Trophy	QF	Joe Pigott	21	N/A	
2020–21	EFL League; One	46	12	15	19	54	70	51	19th	R2	London Senior Cup	N/A	Joe Pigott	21	N/A	
2020–21	EFL League; One	46	12	15	19	54	70	51	19th	R2	Surrey Senior Cup	N/A	Joe Pigott	21	N/A	
2021–22	EFL League; One	46	6	19	21	49	75	37	23rd ↓ Relegated	R3	EFL Cup	R3	Jack Rudoni	12	7,704	
2021–22	EFL League; One	46	6	19	21	49	75	37	23rd ↓ Relegated	R3	EFL Trophy	Group stage	Jack Rudoni	12	7,704	
2022–23	EFL League; Two	46	11	15	20	48	60	48	21st	R2	EFL Cup	R1	Ethan Chislett	9	7,604	
2022–23	EFL League; Two	46	11	15	20	48	60	48	21st	R2	EFL Trophy	R3	Ethan Chislett	9	7,604	
2023–24	EFL League; Two	46	17	14	15	64	51	65	10th	R3	EFL Cup	R2	Ali Al-Hamadi; Omar Bugiel	13	7,893	
2023–24	EFL League; Two	46	17	14	15	64	51	65	10th	R3	EFL Trophy	QF	Ali Al-Hamadi; Omar Bugiel	13	7,893	
2024–25	EFL League; Two	46	20	13	13	56	35	73	5th Promoted via Play-offs‡	R2	EFL Cup	R3	Matty Stevens	21	7,924	
2024–25	EFL League; Two	46	20	13	13	56	35	73	5th Promoted via Play-offs‡	R2	EFL Trophy	R32	Matty Stevens	21	7,924	
2025–26	EFL League; One	46	15	8	23	51	72	53	19th	R1	EFL Cup	R2	Marcus Browne	14	8,378	
2025–26	EFL League; One	46	15	8	23	51	72	53	19th	R1	EFL Trophy	Quarter-Finals	Marcus Browne	14	8,378	

== Notes ==
A. AFC Wimbledon were defeated 2–1 by Fisher Athletic in the Isthmian League Premier Division play-off semi-final on 2 May 2006, preventing the club from achieving three back-to-back promotions.
B. AFC Wimbledon were deducted 3-points and fined £400 (reduced from an 18-point deduction on appeal) for the fielding of Jermaine Darlington who had not been registered correctly by the club as he required 'international clearance' in order to be transferred from the Football Association of Wales to the Football Association of England and had therefore played in three matches whilst still ineligible. The 'Darlington affair' also resulted in expulsion from the Surrey Senior Cup and the FA Trophy that season.
C. AFC Wimbledon were defeated 1–0 by Bromley in the Isthmian League Premier Division play-off semi-final on 1 May 2007.
D. AFC Wimbledon beat Staines Town 2–1 in the Isthmian League Premier Division play-off final on 3 May 2008.
E. AFC Wimbledon beat Luton Town 4–3 in a penalty shoot-out after the match had ended 0–0 in extra time in the 2011 Conference National play-off final on 21 May 2011.
F. AFC Wimbledon were deducted 3 points and given a £5,000 fine suspended for one year by a Football Disciplinary Commission hearing for the ineligible fielding of Jake Nicholson in a 4–3 win over Cheltenham Town on 22 March 2014. In addition the club was required to pay the costs of the hearing. It was found that the player's multiplicity contract had in fact expired on 19 March 2014 and had not been renewed on that date due to the illness of a key member of the club's administrative staff.
G. AFC Wimbledon beat Plymouth Argyle 2–0 in the 2016 Football League Two play-off final on 30 May 2016.
H. AFC Wimbledon finished the season with a 1.00 PPG (35 points in 35 matches) which finished them in 20th position above Tranmere Rovers by 0.06 PPG after League One voted to curtail the season following months of postponement due to the COVID-19 pandemic.
