= Plough Lane (1912) =

Former football stadium

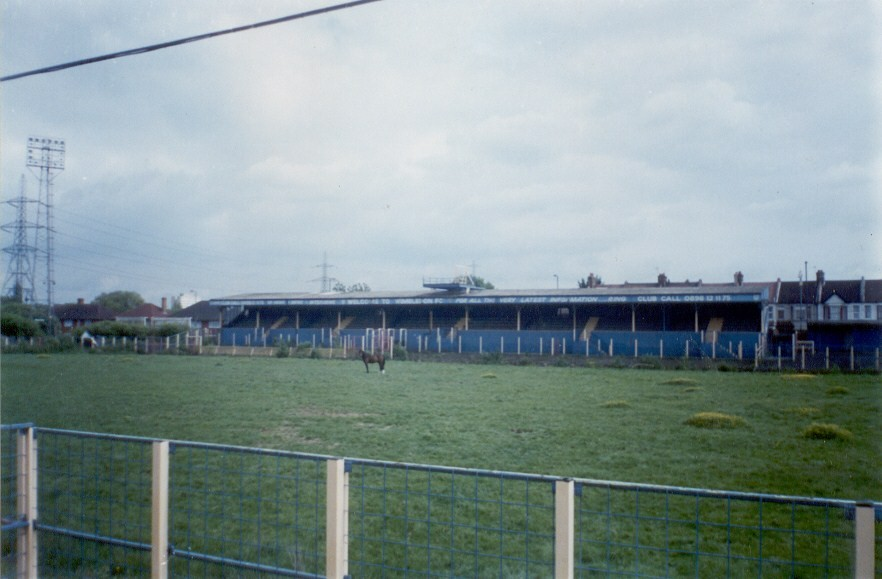
- The South Stand, pictured in 2000
- Interactive map of Plough Lane
- Location: Wimbledon, London, England
- Coordinates: 51°25′42.5″N 0°11′22.8″W
- Owner: Merton Borough Council (1912–1959); Wimbledon F.C. (1959–1984); Sam Hammam (1984–1998); Safeway (1998–2002)
- Operator: Wimbledon F.C. (1912–1998); Crystal Palace F.C. (1991–1998)
- Capacity: 15,876
- Surface: Grass

Construction
- Built: 1912
- Opened: September 1912
- Renovated: 1957
- Closed: April 1998 (last football game)
- Demolished: 2002

Tenants
- Wimbledon F.C. (1912–1991); Wimbledon F.C. Reserves (1991–1998); Crystal Palace F.C. Reserves (1991–1998)

Plough Lane was a football stadium in Wimbledon, south west London, England. For nearly eighty years it was the home ground of Wimbledon Football Club.

Plough Lane was Wimbledon F.C.'s ground from September 1912 until May 1991, when the club moved their first team home matches to Selhurst Park as part of a groundshare agreement with Crystal Palace. Both clubs' reserve teams then used Plough Lane as their home ground until 1998, when the site was sold to Safeway, who intended to redevelop the site as a supermarket. Whilst site redevelopment plans were negotiated, the stadium remained derelict for several years until it was finally demolished in 2002. When permission for a supermarket was ultimately refused by the local authority, Safeway sold the site and it was eventually developed as a private housing development known as Reynolds Gate, named after former Wimbledon F.C. striker Eddie Reynolds, which was completed in 2008.

Plans to build a new stadium for AFC Wimbledon on the nearby site of the Wimbledon Greyhound track, situated approximately 200 yards (183 metres) from the original Plough Lane stadium, were approved by Merton Council in December 2015. Construction on the 'New Plough Lane' began in 2018, and it opened on 3 November 2020.

== History ==
=== As Wimbledon F.C.'s home ground ===
The leasehold on the disused marshland at the corner of Plough Lane and Haydons Road was purchased by Wimbledon Football Club in 1912. The pitch was consequently fenced in and the playing surface improved, while a dressing room was built. A stand holding 500 spectators was erected, and Wimbledon played their first match at the ground on 7 September 1912, a friendly match against Carshalton Athletic which was drawn 2–2. Improvements continued to be made to the ground during the First World War, and Plough Lane soon became the pride of the club, in 1918, Vice-president A. Gill Knight boasted that the club had "the finest ground in the southern district".

During the 1920s, crowds were regularly taken at between five and eight thousand. The South Stand was added in 1923, purchased from Clapton Orient. The terrace in front of the North Stand was improved during 1932–33, and by the start of the Second World War the ground's capacity stood at 30,000. The ground was even used as the site of an amateur international match, when England took on Wales on 19 January 1935. However, damage caused during the Second World War meant that extensive redevelopment was necessary after the club returned in 1944 — the South Stand had been bombed, and the incomplete fencing meant the club could not charge for admission. Half-time collections were taken to keep the club operating.

The South Stand was restored to its former glory in 1950, and 1950–51 saw the capacity back around the 25,000 mark. Glass panels were fitted at each end of both stands two years later, at the cost of £90, 8s — a sum equivalent to £1,374 in 2009. Floodlights were purchased in July 1954, and the North Stand was completely rebuilt before the 1957–58 season. The ground's freehold was purchased from Merton Borough Council by chairman Sydney Black for £8,250 in November 1959, and then donated to the club. Black announced at the same time that the floodlights purchased five years earlier would be erected on eight pylons the next year at the cost of £4,000. Due to inflation, the price paid by Black for the stadium would have been equal to £104,591 in 2009 — this became significant as one of the conditions of the sale of the ground was the insertion of a pre-emption clause stating that if the site was ever to be used for any purpose other than sport, the council would have the right to buy the ground back for the same price it had been paid, regardless of inflation. As the pound sterling's value decreased over the years, this clause became a double-edged sword — it protected the club from asset strippers, but also meant that the stadium's value could never grow above the £8,250 that Black had paid in 1959.

The first match under the new floodlights took place on 3 October 1960, in a London Charity Cup match against Arsenal. Arsenal beat Wimbledon 4–1. The ground remained largely unchanged until the club's election to the Football League, though during 1971–72 an attempt was made to start a market on the club's grounds to raise funds. The High Court ruled that this plan contravened a statute decreed by Charles I in 1628 forbidding any market within seven miles of Kingston upon Thames's market— the court reckoned the distance to be five and a half miles, so no market was built. Despite election to the Football League in 1977 and subsequent success, the club was still plagued by financial trouble. To try and ease the strain on the club, in April 1983 Wimbledon bought out the preemption clause inserted back in 1959 for £100,000. A year later, they sold the ground to club chairman Sam Hammam for £3 million.

Following the publication of the Taylor Report in 1990, which introduced new safety measures for football stadia including the regulation that the stadia of teams at the highest level be made all-seater by August 1994, the board of the club decided that Plough Lane could not be economically redeveloped to meet the new standards. The work required to modernise Plough Lane would have been difficult and expensive, but not impossible as the board claimed. A supposedly temporary groundshare with Crystal Palace at Selhurst Park was announced the same year, to begin from the start of the 1991–92 season. This arrangement was only expected to last for a few seasons, but it would ultimately last for 12 years and would end in a very different fashion to what might have been expected at the outset. Wimbledon's final first team match at Plough Lane came on 4 May 1991, coincidentally against Crystal Palace. 10,002 spectators saw Crystal Palace beat Wimbledon 3–0, before swarming onto the pitch to bid farewell to the ground.

Plans to build a new 20,000-seat stadium in the London Borough of Merton had been approved by the local council in 1988, but the club did not follow this up and the stadium was never built. A public park was later established on its planned site. Over the next decade, numerous options for a new stadium to be built in either the London Borough of Merton or elsewhere were explored, including a controversial plan to relocate to Dublin, in the Republic of Ireland, which emerged in 1995.

Finally, Wimbledon relocated to Milton Keynes some 70 miles away in 2003, in a controversial move which had been approved the previous year and sparked the creation of AFC Wimbledon by the majority of the club's fans. The original Wimbledon club was renamed Milton Keynes Dons in 2004. The new Wimbledon club started life in the Combined Counties League and reached the Football League in 2011.

=== After Wimbledon F.C. ===
Even after the departure of the Wimbledon first team, Plough Lane continued to be used by both Wimbledon and Crystal Palace as the home ground for their reserve teams' home matches. This was the case until 1998, when Sam Hammam sold the ground to supermarket chain Safeway. Safeway sought to build a supermarket on the site for four years but, after local residents' opposition and local authority objections to their plans, gave up in 2002. They demolished the stadium during the summer of that year and subsequently sold the vacant site to David Wilson Homes in November 2002. Planning permission was granted to the developer in October 2005 to build 570 flats, and the development was completed in 2008. Following lobbying by Wimbledon supporters, the development agreed to adopt a Wimbledon Football Club theme, with the entire site named "Reynolds Gate" after former player Eddie Reynolds. The six individual blocks that comprise the development were also named after former players, managers and a chairman: Bassett House, Batsford House, Cork House, Lawrie House, Reed House and Stannard House.
