= Stuart Murdoch =

Stuart Murdoch may refer to:

- Stuart Murdoch (musician), lead singer of Belle & Sebastian
- Stuart Murdoch (football manager), former footballer and ex-manager of Wimbledon F.C.

== See also ==
- Stewart Murdoch (born 1990), Scottish footballer
