= List of football clubs in England and Wales by year formed =

This is a list of football league clubs in the top four tiers of English football (i.e. the Premier League and the English Football League), as of the 2024–25 season, by year formed. Where month and day are also published, these are recorded in the notes.

Different sources offer alternative dates for club foundation dates, and the date attributed to a club can be disputed. Reasons for differences include:

- Informal status: Clubs can originate as an unincorporated association; sources may include this relatively informal period as part of their history.
- Mergers: Clubs can form by a merger of two clubs, with the date of one of the original clubs being selected as the foundation date.
- Liquidation: Some clubs were liquidated, with a new club adopting the history of the liquidated club.
- Historicity: Some dates are based on non-contemporary accounts with sources of uncertain provenance.
- Continuity: Contemporary newspaper reports may give club names whose direct connection to modern-day clubs is not established.
- Viewing a relocation as a foundation: This applies to MK Dons

Other listings of club foundation dates using different criteria are available.

| # | Year published by club | Club | Season 2025-26 | Notes |
|---|---|---|---|---|
| 1 | 1862 | Notts County | League Two | The organisational link between the 1862 club and "Notts Foot-ball Club" of 1864 (the Notts County of today) unclear. Upon the club's promotion from the National League in 2023, the club reclaimed the status of the world's oldest football league club. |
| 2 | 1863 | Stoke City | Championship | Prior to Notts County rejoining the League in 2023, Stoke City stated they were the oldest professional Football League Club in the world, existing since 1863. Evidence for foundation in 1863 is provided by "The Book of Football"(1905), which names four founder players, and a date of 1863 while discussing Stoke City. That date was adopted by the current club for anniversary celebrations in 1963 and 2013, and included in the current crest. However the 1863 date is disputed. The earliest known newspaper reports of Stoke City under the name Stoke Ramblers, in 1868, stated that Stoke Ramblers had been formed that season, and some of the details in these reports may have been used in the 1905 book in the description of the events claimed to be in 1863. The club underwent a merger in 1878, when it became known simply as Stoke, and was liquidated in 1908, but refounded shortly after. Contemporary reports called this refounded club, "new" |
| 3 | 1864 | Wrexham AFC | Championship | Wrexham Football and Athletic Club founded in 1864, renamed as Wrexham Football Club in 1872 and wound up in 1883, to be replaced by Wrexham Olympic Football Club. This club was renamed to Wrexham Football Club in 1888. |
| 4 | 1865 | Nottingham Forest | Premier League | Nottingham Forest state that a group of shinney players founded the club in 1865. The exact date of the club's formation is unknown, but returns from the club to the 1870s Alcock's Football Annual stated October 1865 as the month of formation, and football matches were documented from 1866. A late Victorian source described the date of formation of Forest as "a matter of some uncertainty, but most probably as far back as 1864". Former league club Notts County claim an earlier foundation date of 1862; following their relegation from the fourth tier of the English Football League in 2019, the EFL stated that Nottingham Forest were now the oldest professional football league club. This was contested by Stoke City, who claim 1863 as their foundation year. |
| 5 | 1867 | Sheffield Wednesday | Championship | The club state a foundation date of 4 September 1867. The club were founded as The Wednesday Football Club in 1867 as an offshoot of The Wednesday Cricket Club formed 1820. The exact date of formation is disputed, with both 4 and 5 September 1867 reported as the date of formation in newspapers published in the same week. The first reported practice match was on 12 October 1867; their first competitive fixtures were in February 1868 in the Cromwell Cup. The club formally adopted its current name in 1929, previously it was referred to variously as Wednesday, The Wednesday and Sheffield Wednesday. |
| 6 | 1867 | Chesterfield | League Two | 19 October 1867 |
| 7 | 1871 | Reading | League One | Reading Football Club was formed during the festive period of late 1871 by a group of young townsmen, most notably Joseph Edward Sydenham who met with his co-founders to form the club at the Bridge Street Rooms. The club’s first match was played two months later. On 21 February 1872 Reading played out a 0-0 draw against Reading School at the Reading Recreation Ground (now King’s Meadow). |
| 8 | 1874 | Aston Villa | Premier League | Some debate over March or November 1874 Villa say 21 November 1874 is a legend. |
| 9 | 1874 | Bolton Wanderers | League One | Formed as Christ Church FC, no exact date known though possibly June. Renamed Bolton Wanderers in 1877 |
| 10 | 1875 | Birmingham City | Championship | Founded as Small Heath Alliance in 1875, exact date unknown |
| 11 | 1875 | Blackburn Rovers | Championship | Founded at a meeting on 5 November 1875 |
| 12 | 1876 | Middlesbrough | Championship | Original club founded in 1876, though date stated as vague. Other source says 20 October 1876. Club merged then demerged from another club in 1892. |
| 13 | 1876 | Port Vale | League Two | Disputed whether original club foundation is 1876 or 1879. Exact date in 1876 not known. The club was wound up, with the name used by a successor club in 1909. |
| 14 | 1877 | Crewe Alexandra | League Two | August 1877; Crewe played their first match against a side from Basford in North Staffordshire on 1 December 1877. |
| 15 | 1877 | Wolverhampton Wanderers | Championship | Originally called St Lukes, date not recorded. Merged with another club in 1879. |
| 16 | 1878 | Everton | Premier League | Formed as St Domingo's, 1 January 1878 |
| 17 | 1878 | Ipswich Town | EFL Championship | Founded 16 October 1878. Merged with a rugby club in 1888. |
| 18 | 1878 | Manchester United | Premier League | Founded in 1878 as Newton Heath LYR F.C. Renamed in 1902; liquidation was avoided. |
| 19 | 1878 | West Bromwich Albion | Championship | Disputed whether 1878 or 1879, any football in 1878 on an informal basis. Club states 1878. |
| 20 | 1878 | Grimsby Town | League Two | Formed in 1878 after a meeting held at the Wellington Arms public house in Freeman Street, Grimsby. |
| 21 | 1879 | Doncaster Rovers | League One | Liquidated and reformed in 1914. |
| 22 | 1879 | Fulham | Premier League | Primarily cricket in its early days. |
| 23 | 1879 | Sunderland | Premier League | First recorded competitive game was against Ferryhill Athletic on 13 November 1880. In 1881 the club's name was changed to Sunderland Association Football Club. Dispute over 1879 and 1880. |
| 24 | 1879 | Swindon Town | League Two | Dispute on whether formation was in 1879 or 1881. Merged with another club in 1881. Club only states 1879. |
| 25 | 1880 | Manchester City | Premier League | Started as a church team, exact date not known |
| 26 | 1880 | Preston North End | Championship | Given in club history as May 1880, not clear when football started to be played. |
| 27 | 1881 | Newcastle United | Premier League | Founded in November 1881 as Stanley, which then adopted the name of Newcastle East End in October 1882. The club then changed name to Newcastle United in 1892 following the demise of city rivals West End Football Club, taking over certain assets including West End's remaining lease on St James' Park in the process. |
| 28 | 1881 | Watford | Championship | West Herts (formerly Watford Rovers, founded 1881) absorbed rivals Watford St Mary's in 1898 and were renamed Watford. |
| 29 | 1882 | Burnley | Championship | |
| 30 | 1882 | Tottenham Hotspur | Premier League | 5 September 1882 as Hotspur Football Club |
| 31 | 1882 | Queens Park Rangers | Championship | Amalgamation of two clubs in 1886 with the older formed in 1882, 1882 is in the club crest. The club states 1882 "signifies the very earliest roots of our club's beginnings" |
| 32 | 1883 | Bristol Rovers | League Two | September 1883 |
| 33 | 1883 | Coventry City | Premier League | Coventry City formed as Singers F.C. in 1883 at an unknown date before adopting their current name in 1898. |
| 34 | 1883 | Stockport County | League One | Stockport County Football Club founded in 1883 as Heaton Norris Rovers. A group of teenage boys and young men founded the club. They were students at the Wycliffe Congregational Chapel Sunday school on Wellington Road North and the historic Stockport Sunday School. |
| 35 | 1884 | Derby County | Championship | An offshoot of Derbyshire County Cricket Club |
| 36 | 1884 | Leicester City | EFL Championship | Original club, Leicester Fosse, closed down in 1919 to be replaced by Leicester City. Club's history states first football match 1 November 1884. |
| 37 | 1884 | Tranmere Rovers | League Two | Original club, Belmont FC, closed down in 1884 to be replaced by Tranmere. |
| 38 | 1884 | Lincoln City | League One | The club state they were officially formed as an amateur association in 1884, though there had been a team playing since the 1860s |
| 39 | 1885 | Luton Town | League One | Merger between local clubs, Wanderers and Excelsior, announced on 11 April 1885 |
| 40 | 1885 | Millwall | Championship | No exact date supplied by club |
| 41 | 1885 | Southampton | EFL Championship | |
| 41 | 1886 | Arsenal | Premier League | No exact date given, described as 'late 1886' |
| 43 | 1886 | Plymouth Argyle | Championship | The club state 1886 was the year "the original Argyle was formed". |
| 44 | 1886 | Shrewsbury Town | League One | Club views 1886 as the origin, though says roots go back to 1879. |
| 45 | 1887 | Blackpool | League One | Formed by breakaway from another club 1877 sometimes claimed, however club states "founded in 1887 on the back of a breakaway from local outfit St John's FC" |
| 46 | 1887 | Barnsley | League One | Founded as "Barnsley St. Peter's" on 17 September 1887, but subsequently dropped the "St. Peter's" in 1897. |
| 47 | 1887 | Cheltenham Town | League Two | Club states previously thought to be 1892, moved back to 1887 due to evidence of football being played earlier in the town. |
| 48 | 1887 | Wycombe Wanderers | League One | |
| 49 | 1888 | Walsall | League Two | Amalgamation of two older clubs as Walsall Town Swifts |
| 50 | 1881 | Leyton Orient | League One | Founded in 1881 as the Glyn Cricket Club; the club began playing football as Orient in 1888. Club state the existing Cricket Club adopted football on 3 March 1888. |
| 51 | 1889 | Brentford | Premier League | Club states 10 October 1889. |
| 52 | 1889 | Forest Green Rovers | National League | Founded October 1889 |
| 53 | 1889 | Sheffield United | Championship | Club state foundation on 22 March 1889 |
| 54 | 1892 | Liverpool | Premier League | The club state that on 15 March 1892, John Houlding broke from the board of Everton to form Liverpool FC, and that the club was formally recognised by the Board of Trade on 3 June. |
| 55 | 1893 | Gillingham | League Two | Formed as New Brompton Football Club in 1893 before being renamed Gillingham in 1912. The 1893 date was displayed on the club badge from 1995 to 2007 however, the club celebrated 2012 as '100 years since the birth of the Gills'. |
| 56 | 1893 | Oxford United | Championship | Originally formed as Headington United, changing to Oxford United in 1960. History includes a merger in 1911. |
| 57 | 1894 | Bristol City | Championship | |
| 58 | 1896 | Crawley Town | League One | Played informally from 1890. |
| 59 | 1897 | Mansfield Town | League One | Club states "many dates have been given, however most are apocryphal or at the very least wildly inaccurate" |
| 60 | 1897 | Northampton Town | League One | Went into administration in 1992 but escaped liquidation. Club states foundation on 6 March 1897. |
| 61 | 1898 | Sutton United | National League | Club was formed on 5 March 1898 after Sutton Guild Rovers F.C and Sutton Association F.C agreed to merge. |
| 62 | 1898 | Portsmouth | Championship | |
| 63 | 1899 | AFC Bournemouth | Premier League | Formed as Boscombe FC in 1899 from an earlier club; some give 1890 as original date. |
| 64 | 1899 | Cardiff City | Championship | Formed as Riverside. |
| 65 | 1895 | West Ham United | Premier League | Forerunner was Thames Ironworks in 1895. |
| 66 | 1901 | Brighton & Hove Albion | Premier League | Claims of connection to previous clubs. Club states date of 24 June 1901. |
| 67 | 1901 | Barrow AFC | League Two | |
| 68 | 1901 | Exeter City | League One | Adopted current name in 1904, previously thought to be a merger. |
| 69 | 1902 | Norwich City | Championship | Original club liquidated 1917 and reformed 1919. |
| 70 | 1903 | Bradford City | League One | formed from Manningham FC after a switch from Rugby League |
| 71 | 1904 | Carlisle United | National League | Liquidation and reform in 1911. |
| 72 | 1904 | Hull City | Premier League | |
| 73 | 1905 | Charlton Athletic | EFL Championship | |
| 74 | 1905 | Chelsea | Premier League | Date given by club 10 March 1905. |
| 75 | 1905 | Crystal Palace | Premier League | The club was founded in September 1905, however the club released research in 2020 suggesting an 1861 date, stating that they were "staking a claim to be recognised as the world's oldest league club in existence still playing professional football." This asserts a continuity between a club named Crystal Palace Football Club founded in 1861 and the club in 1905, even though the 1861 club ceased to play fixtures after 1876. The claim has been dismissed by football historians. The EFL have stated that Notts County are the oldest current League club (1862). |
| 76 | 1908 | Huddersfield Town | League One | Liquidated and reformed in 1912 |
| 77 | 1912 | Cambridge United | League One | |
| 78 | 1912 | Swansea City | Championship | Original club wound up in 1985 |
| 79 | 1914 | Harrogate Town | League Two | Harrogate AFC joined the Northern Football League in 1914, but the First World War meant that fixtures were postponed. Harrogate AFC would play their first game in 1919. Adopted the name Harrogate Town in 1948. |
| 80 | 1919 | Leeds United | Premier League | Formed 17 October 1919 following disbanding of a previous club. |
| 81 | 1925 | Rotherham United | League One | 1925 merger |
| 82 | 1932 | Wigan Athletic | League One | Several teams created and wound up prior to current club. |
| 83 | 1934 | Peterborough United | League One | Club created 17 May 1934. |
| 84 | 1937 | Colchester United | League Two | Replaced an amateur club which folded the same year Club announced 14 July 1937 |
| 85 | 1940 | Salford City | League Two | |
| 86 | 1950 | Burton Albion | League One | Succeeded other clubs in the town. Club states 6 July 1950. |
| 87 | 1968 | Accrington Stanley | League Two | Reformed, following the demise of a previous club of the same name in 1963. |
| 88 | 1976 | Stevenage | League One | |
| 89 | 1989 | Newport County | League Two | Liquidated and reformed in 1989. Club states "It is important to distinguish between Newport County (the Ironsides) a club of the past and Newport County AFC (the Exiles) the club of the present and the future)." |
| 90 | 1997 | Fleetwood Town | League One | Several previous versions. The club site states "The club reformed as Fleetwood Wanderers in 1997" |
| 91 | 2002 | AFC Wimbledon | League One | Viewed as a new club and not a continuation of Wimbledon FC |
| 92 | 2004 | MK Dons | League Two | Although the club was a continuation of Wimbledon FC (formed 1889), moving from Wimbledon to Milton Keynes in 2003, the club considers its foundation from when the club was renamed in 2004. |
