= List of Milton Keynes Dons F.C. seasons =

Milton Keynes Dons Football Club (usually abbreviated to MK Dons) is a professional association football club based in Milton Keynes, Buckinghamshire, England, founded in 2004. The club was formed from Wimbledon F.C. after the latter had relocated to Milton Keynes. The club renamed itself as the 'Milton Keynes Dons' but subsequently considers itself to be a new club founded in 2004 (the club badge includes MMIV - Roman Numerals for 2004).

The MK Dons continued in Wimbledon's league place which, after relegation in the previous season, was in the 2004–05 Football League One. After two seasons in the third tier of English football, they were relegated to the fourth tier (League Two). They were promoted in their second League Two season, as champions. Their second spell in League One lasted seven seasons, when in 2015, they finished in second place and therefore moved up to the Football League Championship. However in 2016, they were relegated back down to League One.

As of the end of 2025–26, the club's first team had spent one season in the second tier of English football, fifteen seasons in the third tier and six in the fourth. The table details their achievements in first-team competitions, and records their top goalscorer and average home league attendance, for each completed season since their first appearance under its present name in the Football League in 2004–05.

== Key ==
Key to divisions

- Championship = Football League Championship
- League One = Football League One/EFL League One
- League Two = Football League Two/EFL League Two

Key to positions and symbols

- 1st – Champions
- 2nd – Runners-up
- ↑ – Promoted
- ↓ – Relegated

Key to rounds

- Group = Group stage
- R1 = First round, etc.
- QF = Quarter-finals
- F(S) = Finalists of the Southern Section (EFL Trophy only)
- W = Winners

== Seasons ==
List of seasons, including league division and statistics, cup results, top scorer and average league attendance
Season	League									FA Cup	EFL Cup	EFL Trophy	Top goalscorer (Note: Goals in all competitions (Football League, FA Cup, EFL Cup and EFL Trophy) are counted.)		Average attendance
Season	Division	P	W	D	L	F	A	Pts	Pos	FA Cup	EFL Cup	EFL Trophy	Name	Goals	Average attendance
2004–05	League One	46	12	15	19	54	67	51	20th	R3	R2	R2	Izale McLeod	18	4,896
2005–06	League One ↓	46	12	14	20	45	66	50	22nd	R3	R1	QF	Izale McLeod	18	5,776
2006–07	League Two	46	25	9	12	76	58	84	4th (Note: Lost in the play-off semi-final to Shrewsbury Town, 2–1 on aggregate)	R2	R3	R2	Izale McLeod	24	5,990
2007–08	League Two ↑	46	29	10	7	82	37	92	1st	R1	R2	W	Mark Wright	15	9,456
2008–09	League One	46	26	9	11	83	47	87	3rd (Note: Lost in the play-off semi-final to Scunthorpe United, 7–6 on penalties (first leg was 1–1; the second was 0–0 after 90 minutes and extra time))	R1	R2	R2	Aaron Wilbraham	17	10,550
2009–10	League One	46	17	9	20	60	68	60	12th	R3	R1	F(S)	Jermaine Easter	19	10,289
2010–11	League One	46	23	8	15	67	60	77	5th (Note: Lost in the play-off semi-final to Peterborough United, 4–3 on aggregate)	R1	R3	R2	Sam Baldock	13	8,512
2011–12	League One	46	22	14	10	84	47	80	5th (Note: Lost in the play-off semi-final to Huddersfield Town, 3–2 on aggregate)	R3	R3	R1	Dean Bowditch	14	8,659
2012–13	League One	46	19	13	14	62	45	70	8th	R5	R3	R1	Two players (Note: Dean Bowditch and Ryan Lowe were joint top scorers in the 2012–13 season)	12	8,612
2013–14	League One	46	17	9	20	63	65	60	10th	R3	R2	R2	Patrick Bamford	17	9,047
2014–15	League One ↑	46	27	10	9	101	44	91	2nd	R2	R4	R2	Will Grigg	22	9,452
2015–16	Championship ↓	46	9	12	25	39	69	39	23rd	R4	R3	— (Note: As members of the Football League Championship, Milton Keynes Dons were not eligible to participate in the 2015–16 Football League Trophy.)	Two players (Note: Josh Murphy and Nicky Maynard were joint top scorers in the 2015–16 season)	7	13,158
2016–17	League One	46	16	13	17	60	58	61	12th	R3	R2	R2	Kieran Agard	14	10,307
2017–18	League One ↓	46	11	12	23	43	69	45	23rd	R4	R2	R2	Chuks Aneke	10	9,202
2018–19	League Two ↑	46	23	10	13	71	49	79	3rd	R1	R2	Group	Kieran Agard	22	8,224
2019–20 (Note: Fixtures were suspended on 13 March 2020 due to the COVID-19 pandemic. Clubs later voted to end the season prematurely with immediate effect on 9 June 2020, with the final table decided upon by an unweighted points-per-game system resulting in the club finishing the season in 19th place.)	League One	35	10	7	18	36	47	37	19th	R1	R3	R3	Rhys Healey	12	9,246
2020–21	League One	46	18	11	17	64	62	65	13th	R3	R1	R2	Cameron Jerome	15	
2021–22	League One	46	26	11	9	78	44	89	3rd (Note: Lost in the play-off semi-final to Wycombe Wanderers, 2–1 on aggregate)	R1	R1	R3	Scott Twine	20	9,314
2022–23	League One ↓	46	11	12	23	44	66	45	21st	R2	R4	R3	Mohamed Eisa	14	8,460
2023–24	League Two	46	23	9	14	83	68	78	4th (Note: Lost in the play-off semi-final to Crawley Town, 8–1 on aggregate)	R1	R1	R2	Max Dean	19	6,855
2024–25	League Two	46	14	10	22	52	66	52	19th	R1	R1	Group	Alex Gilbey	11	7,025
2025–26	League Two ↑	46	24	14	8	86	45	86	2nd	R3	R1	Group	Callum Paterson	16	8,563
