= Dave Bassett =

English football manager (born 1944)

Personal information
- Full name: David Thomas Bassett
- Date of birth: 4 September 1944 (age 82)
- Place of birth: Stanmore, England
- Position: Midfielder

Senior career*
Years	Team	Apps	(Gls)
1961–1962	Hayes		
1963–1964	Wycombe Wanderers		
1964–1965	Hayes		
1965–1966	Watford (Amateur)		
1966–1967	Hendon		
1967	St Albans City		
1967–1970	Hayes		
1970–1974	Walton & Hersham		
1974–1978	Wimbledon		

International career
1971–1973	England Amateurs	9	(0)

Managerial career
- 1981–1987: Wimbledon
- 1987–1988: Watford
- 1988–1995: Sheffield United
- 1996–1997: Crystal Palace
- 1997–1999: Nottingham Forest
- 1999–2000: Barnsley
- 2001–2002: Leicester City
- 2004: Leicester City (caretaker)
- 2005: Southampton (caretaker)
- * Club domestic league appearances and goals

David Thomas Bassett (born 4 September 1944) is an English football manager and a former player. Bassett won a total of seven promotions and is one of a select number of managers who took charge of over 1,000 matches.

Bassett was born in Stanmore. After a playing career at semi-professional level, he took charge of Fourth Division Wimbledon in 1981, and led them to the First Division within five years; he resigned in 1987 after leading the Dons to 6th place in the top flight. Following a brief stint at Watford, he took over at Sheffield United, leading United to two consecutive promotions from 1988 to 1990. United remained in the top-flight until 1994, when they were relegated on the final day of the season. Bassett was sacked after a poor start to the 1994-95 season. Bassett next managed Crystal Palace, losing in the First Division play-off final in 1996.

In 1997, Bassett was appointed general manager and assistant to Stuart Pearce at Nottingham Forest. When Forest were relegated, Bassett took over as manager, leading the club back to the Premier League as Division One champions in 1998. Bassett was sacked in December 1998 with Forest in the relegation zone. Bassett became manager of Barnsley in May 1999, and led them to the play-off final, which they lost to Ipswich Town. His last role as permanent manager was at Leicester City F.C., which ended in the Foxes' relegation in 2002. Subsequently, Bassett had roles as caretaker manager at Leicester City and Southampton and served as assistant manager to Dennis Wise at Leeds United.

== Playing career ==
As a player Bassett was a defensive midfielder at a semi-professional level, playing for Hayes between 1961 and 1963, returning to the club on two occasions from 1964 to 1966 and 1968 to 1969. He also played for Wycombe Wanderers in 1963–64, for St Albans City, where he made 11 appearances in the 1967–68 season and for Walton & Hersham between 1969 and 1974, where he was captain of the side that won the FA Amateur Cup in 1973. He was capped by England at amateur level.

Bassett joined Wimbledon in 1974 and was part of the Wimbledon team who, in the 1975 FA Cup, famously beat First Division Burnley away in the 3rd round and then forced a draw in the 4th round at reigning League Champions Leeds United, before losing narrowly 1–0 (the goal being a wide shot that deflected in off Bassett's knee) in the replay.

Bassett made a total of 141 appearances for Wimbledon whilst in the Southern League, 99 league and 42 cup: 53 appearances in 1974–75 scoring two goals, 43 in 1975–76 scoring two goals and 45 in 1976–77. In the Football League, Bassett made 39 appearances for Wimbledon: 35 league, one FA Cup and three League Cup, scoring once. Bassett also made 10 amateur international appearances whilst playing for Walton & Hersham.

Bassett retired from playing and became assistant manager soon after Wimbledon won election to the Football League in 1977 under the management of Allen Batsford.

== Management career ==
=== Wimbledon ===
Bassett was promoted to first team manager following the departure of Allen Batsford's successor, Dario Gradi, to Crystal Palace in January 1981, when Wimbledon were ninth in the Fourth Division. Wimbledon's form improved substantially following Bassett's appointment, and a 4–1 home win over Rochdale on 28 April 1981 (the penultimate game of the season) secured promotion to the Third Division.

Wimbledon initially struggled at the higher level during 1981–82, Bassett's first full season in charge, and they spent most of the season in a relegation battle. Despite winning four of their last five games of the season, they were still relegated back to the Fourth Division on goal difference, in 21st place.

An excellent campaign in 1982–83 saw Bassett guide Wimbledon to promotion as the Fourth Division championship title winners with 98 points – the highest in any Football League division that year.

Although Wimbledon lost their first two games back in the Third Division, they crushed Newport County (who had narrowly missed out on promotion to the Second Division the previous season) 6–0 at home in the third game of the league campaign, and by Christmas they were genuine promotion contenders. Promotion was sealed on the penultimate day of the season with Bolton Wanderers beating Sheffield United 3–1.

In June 1984, Bassett accepted an offer to become manager of Second Division club Crystal Palace, but changed his mind within 72 hours, refused to sign the contract at Selhurst Park, and returned to Wimbledon, stating that "I gave it some serious thought, but in the end it just did not feel right. We have unfinished business, and I didn't really want to leave here."

Wimbledon's life as a Second Division club began with a notable 2–2 home draw against promotion favourites Manchester City on the opening day of the 1984–85 season. Wimbledon finally managed a secure 12th-place finish, in a season when they were never in any danger of being relegated or having any prospect of promotion.

The 1985–86 season began well at Plough Lane, with a comfortable 3-0 home win over a financially troubled Middlesbrough. By the end of October 1985, Wimbledon were third in the league and were contenders for a third promotion in four seasons – a feat previously achieved only by Swansea City. On the final day of the season, a 1–1 draw at Bradford City saw Wimbledon seal the third and final promotion place to reach the First Division, only a mere nine years after joining the Football League.

In the 1986–87 season, Wimbledon got off to a dream start in the First Division and a 1–0 win at Charlton Athletic on 2 September 1986 put them top of the league. They stayed top the following week, until they were overtaken by Nottingham Forest eleven days later. Wimbledon's form for the remainder of the autumn was less impressive, as they finished October in 14th place, but they steadily recovered as the season went on and achieved a highly impressive sixth place in the league with 66 points – ahead of Manchester United. Bassett also guided his team to a shock 3–1 over eventual league champions Everton in the FA Cup fifth round, though their hopes of cup glory were put on hold for a year when they lost 2–0 at home to Tottenham Hotspur in the quarter-final.

Whilst still hugely popular with both the club's fans and his own players, Bassett resigned from the club in June 1987, after chairman Sam Hammam attempted to insert a clause into Bassett's contract that would allow Hammam to veto Bassett's team selections. Taking the vacant job at Watford, Bassett handed the reins at Wimbledon to Bobby Gould.

=== Watford ===
Bassett's reign as Watford manager was short-lived. The team had just finished ninth in the 1986–87 season under the management of Graham Taylor, who had left to take charge of relegated Aston Villa. Before Bassett's arrival, Watford also sold John Barnes to Liverpool but, instead of retaining the nucleus of the successful side of the mid-80s, he sold several other first-team regulars including Kevin Richardson, David Bardsley and Lee Sinnott. Their replacements did not do as well, and when Watford started the 1987–88 season in poor form, the blame was placed on Bassett who was sacked in January 1988 with the club bottom of the First Division and relegation to the Second Division looking inevitable.

=== Sheffield United ===
In 1987–88, Bassett became one of the few managers to have the dubious honour of being involved with two relegated clubs in the same season. On 21 January 1988, just days after leaving Watford, he took over at Sheffield United. Despite bringing in several new players, he was unable to prevent an already weak team from sliding into the Third Division after losing the double-legged play-off with Bristol City 2–1

However, with Bassett bringing his own backroom staff during the close season and more new players brought in, he took them back up at the first attempt in 1988–89. A second successive promotion following in 1989–90, and First Division football returned to Bramall Lane in the 1990–91 season for the first time since 1975–76. An influential player in this team was striker Brian Deane, who was capped three times by England.

Sheffield United failed to win any of their first 16 league games in 1990–91, breaking a First Division record in the process, and went into the new year at the bottom of the First Division. But a rousing resurgence in the second half of the season saw the Blades climb up to a secure 13th place in the final table. They did even better in 1991–92, finishing ninth in the First Division and securing a place in the new Premier League.

Sheffield United's Premier League debut was reasonable. They finished 14th in the final table, reached the semi-finals of the FA Cup, and condemned Nottingham Forest to relegation by winning the penultimate game of the season. However, when Brian Deane was sold to Leeds United during the 1993 close season, without him the Blades struggled more and got drawn into a relegation battle. It still looked like Sheffield United would stay up until Bassett's luck finally ran out on the last day of the 1993–94 season. Needing a single point to guarantee that they would avoid relegation, they lost 3–2 at Chelsea, having led 2–1 with 5 minutes remaining, while Everton's 3–2 win over Wimbledon after being 2 goals down, when any result other than an Everton win would have seen Sheffield United stay up, condemned United to relegation. An eighth-place finish in the 1994–95 Division One campaign was not enough for a play-off place, and Bassett resigned the following December with relegation looking more likely than promotion and protests against the board mounting.

=== Crystal Palace ===
Bassett took over at Crystal Palace in early February 1996, taking charge of a club which was standing in 16th place in Division One and had lost most of its players the previous summer. Bassett set about rejuvenating the side, and a remarkable run of form meant that automatic promotion was still a possibility until the penultimate game of the season. In the end, they finished third in the table and reached the playoff final where they lost 2–1 in extra time to Leicester City.

=== Nottingham Forest ===
In March 1997, Bassett left Crystal Palace to join Premier League strugglers Nottingham Forest as general manager and to assist England player, Forest's captain and caretaker manager Stuart Pearce. However Pearce was unable to prevent them from being relegated, but they were promoted back to the Premier League at the first attempt under Bassett's charge after winning the 1997–98 Division One championship.

However, Forest began their Premier League campaign without both Kevin Campbell and Pierre van Hooijdonk, who had scored 53 goals between them during the promotion season. Campbell was sold to Trabzonspor against Bassett's wishes while he was on holiday, then van Hooijdonk went on strike and refused to return to the club. Forest had a very poor start to the 1998–99 Premier League, and Bassett was sacked in January 1999, with "player power" cited as a reason. Forest were unable to avoid the drop under Bassett's successor Ron Atkinson.

=== Barnsley ===
Bassett succeeded John Hendrie as Barnsley manager in May 1999. In his first season at the helm Barnsley reached the Division One play-off final but missed out on promotion to the Premier League after losing to Ipswich Town. Bassett left in December 2000 after failing to mount another promotion challenge. He was linked with a move to succeed Colin Lee at fellow Division One club Wolverhampton Wanderers, but when Lee's successor was announced in the new year it was Dave Jones, formerly of Southampton, who took the role and not Bassett.

=== Leicester City ===
Bassett became Leicester City manager in October 2001. A four-month winless run from December condemned the team to relegation from the Premier League after a six-year tenancy. After a 1–0 defeat to Manchester United which confirmed Leicester's relegation, Bassett became director of football, handing over his managerial duties to assistant Micky Adams. He took over as manager again on 11 October 2004 after Adams' resignation, but left his director of football role after Craig Levein was appointed as Adams' replacement.

=== Southampton ===
Bassett was appointed as assistant manager to Harry Redknapp at Southampton in the summer of 2005, after the departure of Jim Smith. When Redknapp left in December 2005, Bassett became the caretaker manager, a role he shared with Dennis Wise. He left the club on 23 December 2005 after George Burley was appointed full-time manager of the Saints. Bassett stated that he had been led to believe by the chairman that he was the players' choice as next manager. During his brief sojourn in charge at St Mary's, Saints played three matches, with one victory, one draw and one defeat.

=== Watford ===
During the 2006–07 season, Bassett acted as a consultant to manager Aidy Boothroyd during the club's spell in the Premier League.

=== Leeds United ===
On 31 October 2007, Bassett was appointed as assistant manager to Dennis Wise at Leeds United for the remainder of the 2007/08 season. On 29 January 2008, it was reported by the Yorkshire Evening Post that Bassett had left the club, following Dennis Wise's resignation as manager.

=== Sheffield United ===
On 10 February 2011, Bassett returned to Sheffield United in a consultancy role for manager Micky Adams, with the club in the midst of a Championship relegation battle and Adams struggling to adapt to his new job.

== Managerial statistics ==
Managerial record by team and tenure
Team	From	To	Record				
Team	From	To	P	W	D	L	Win %
Wimbledon	1 January 1981	17 June 1987	303	144	85	74	47.5
Watford	18 June 1987	11 January 1988	28	7	8	13	25.0
Sheffield United	21 January 1988	12 December 1995	394	150	143	101	38.1
Crystal Palace	8 February 1996	27 February 1997	60	29	16	15	48.3
Nottingham Forest	8 May 1997	5 January 1999	77	33	20	24	42.9
Barnsley	27 May 1999	19 December 2000	84	38	28	18	45.2
Leicester City	10 October 2001	6 April 2002	27	4	15	8	14.8
Leicester City (caretaker)	11 October 2004	31 October 2004	4	0	0	4	0.0
Southampton (caretaker)	2 December 2005	23 December 2005	3	1	1	1	33.3
Total			992	407	332	253	41.0

== Honours ==
Wimbledon

- Football League Fourth Division fourth-place promotion: 1980–81
- Football League Fourth Division: 1982–83
- Football League Third Division second-place promotion: 1983–84
- Football League Second Division third-place promotion: 1985–86
- Football League Group Cup runner-up: 1981–82

Sheffield United

- Football League Third Division second-place promotion: 1988–89
- Football League Second Division second-place promotion: 1989–90

Nottingham Forest

- Football League First Division: 1997–98

Individual

- League Managers Association Hall of Fame 1000 Club
