= Jeff Darey =

English footballer

Personal information
- Full name: Jeffrey Arthur Darey
- Date of birth: 26 February 1934
- Place of birth: Hammersmith, England
- Date of death: January 2014 (aged 79)
- Place of death: Brighton, England
- Height: 5 ft 9 in (1.75 m)
- Position: Forward

Youth career
- 1950–1951: Wimbledon

Senior career*
Years	Team	Apps	(Gls)
1951–1955	Wimbledon		
1955–1957	Hendon	34	(20)
1957–1961	Brighton & Hove Albion	10	(2)
1961–19??	Guildford City		

International career
1955	England amateur	4	(2)
- * Club domestic league appearances and goals

Jeffrey Arthur Darey (26 February 1934 – January 2014) was an English professional footballer who played as a forward in the Football League for Brighton & Hove Albion. He also played non-League football for clubs including Wimbledon, Hendon and Guildford City. While a Wimbledon player, Darey was capped four times for the England amateur team.
