= Terry Burton =

English football manager and coach (born 1952)

Personal information
- Full name: Terry Burton
- Date of birth: 8 November 1952 (age 73)
- Place of birth: Camden Town, North London, England
- Position: Defender

Youth career
- 1969–1971: Arsenal

Senior career*
Years	Team	Apps	(Gls)
- Folkestone
- Epping Town
1974–1976	Hayes	34	(1)
- Leyton Wingate
- Ilford
1979	Hayes	0	(0)

Managerial career
- 1987: Wealdstone
- 2000–2002: Wimbledon
- * Club domestic league appearances and goals

Terry Burton (born 8 November 1952 in Camden Town, North London) is an English football manager and coach, who was most recently assistant manager at Reading. Burton started his career at Arsenal and was the captain of Arsenal's FA Youth Cup winning team in 1971, before later beginning his coaching career at the club and going on to have further backroom spells at Wimbledon, Watford, Cardiff City and West Bromwich Albion.

== Playing career ==
Burton's playing career started as an Arsenal apprentice where he captained the 1971 FA Youth Cup winning team. He was not offered a professional contract and joined Folkestone during the summer of 1971. He went on to play for Epping Town, Hayes and Leyton Wingate (as player-coach). Towards the end of the 1970s he coached football at Holloway School.

== Coaching career ==
=== Arsenal ===
Burton returned to Arsenal as youth team coach in 1979. During his spell at the club, he was noted for having brought through future Arsenal and England captain Tony Adams, who was later linked with wanting to bring Burton to Portsmouth as his assistant having been appointed the club's manager in 2008. Following Don Howe's appointment as Arsenal manager, Burton was promoted to first team coach, then reserve team coach in 1986 when George Graham became Arsenal manager, though was released for the second time by the club in 1987.

=== Wimbledon ===
After three months managing non-league Wealdstone Burton was appointed reserve team coach at Wimbledon. He subsequently held the positions of Youth Team manager, Assistant Manager under Joe Kinnear (during which time the club achieved 3 top ten finishes in the Premier League and reached both the League Cup and FA Cup semi-finals), Technical Director and Academy Director at the club before he was temporarily charged with managing the first team after the Norwegian Egil Olsen's dismissal with only two games remaining of the club's 1999–2000 Premiership campaign, given the task of keeping Wimbledon in the Premier League. A last minute goal from John Hartson against Aston Villa at Selhurst Park in Burton's first game in charge gave the Dons hope of staying up as long as they matched the result of Bradford City against Liverpool in the final game of the year. A defeat at Southampton on the final day of the season, and a shock 1–0 win at Valley Parade for Bradford meant that Wimbledon's fight against relegation was lost. Despite this, during pre-season Burton was given the role of first team manager permanently.

==== Managerial career ====
Wimbledon achieved respectable top-ten finishes in both of their first two seasons outside the top flight since 1985–86, playing a short passing game, rather than the long-ball the Dons were well known for, but never really made a serious promotion challenge. Although he was popular with the club's fans, Burton incurred the wrath of the chairman after speaking out against the club's proposed relocation to Milton Keynes, and he was promptly dismissed just after the end of the 2001–02 season. He was replaced by goalkeeping coach Stuart Murdoch.

=== Watford ===
Burton spent two years with Watford as assistant manager to Ray Lewington. His role at Vicarage Road had begun during the summer of 2002, shortly after he was dismissed as manager of Wimbledon.

=== Cardiff City ===
Burton joined Cardiff as assistant manager during the 2004–2005 season, during Lennie Lawrence's spell at the club. He has been credited at Cardiff for having brought through Aaron Ramsey, and helped recommend Ramsey to Arsenal manager Arsène Wenger, having retained a longstanding connection to the club. During transfer negotiations in the 2008–2009 season, Burton also advised that Ramsey join Arsenal, citing the similarity between the player and the club's overall style of play. On 30 May 2011, Dave Jones was dismissed and a month later, Burton was placed on gardening leave under new manager, Malky Mackay.

=== West Bromwich Albion ===
Following his leave from Cardiff City, Burton joined West Bromwich Albion as first team coach until the end of the season, on 7 December 2011.

=== Sheffield Wednesday ===
On 5 March 2012, Terry Burton was confirmed as Sheffield Wednesday's assistant manager to once again be reunited with Dave Jones.

=== Arsenal ===
On 5 July 2012, it was announced that Burton was to become Arsenal's new Reserves & Head Development coach, replacing Neil Banfield at the end of the 2011–12 season.

As part of his role, Burton managed the club's reserve team as well as overseeing the club's progress in the 2012–13 NextGen Series.

=== Return To West Bromwich Albion ===
On 13 May 2014, it was announced that Burton was to return to West Bromwich Albion as the new Technical Director replacing previous Technical Director; Richard Garlick. On 30 June 2015, Burton left West Bromwich Albion.

== Honours ==
Arsenal

- FA Youth Cup 1971
