= Allen Batsford =

English football manager (1932–2009)

Personal information
- Date of birth: 9 April 1932
- Date of death: 28 December 2009 (aged 77)
- Position: Midfielder

Youth career
- 1947–1949: Arsenal

Senior career*
| Years | Team | Apps | (Gls) |
| 1949–1955 | Arsenal | 0 | (0) |
| 1955–1958 | Folkestone | | |
| 1958–1959 | Ramsgate | | |
| 1959–1960 | Margate | 10 | (1) |

Managerial career
- Feltham
- 1967–1974: Walton & Hersham
- 1974–1977: Wimbledon
- Hillingdon Borough
- 1980–1983: Wealdstone
- * Club domestic league appearances and goals

Allen Batsford (9 April 1932 – 28 December 2009) was an English football player and manager.

== Managerial career ==
He was appointed manager of Walton & Hersham in 1967 and led them to the Athenian League title in 1969 and the Amateur Cup in 1973. Batsford first tasted glory in the FA Cup when Walton held Brian Clough's Brighton to a draw before beating them 4–0 in the replay. Before the game, Clough had described the pairing as "donkeys against thoroughbreds", but the result from Batsford's team spoke for itself.

In 1974, he left to join Wimbledon, then a semi-professional club in the Southern League. He led them to three consecutive league titles and ultimately election to the Football League in 1977.

Most famously, he steered Wimbledon to the fourth round of the FA Cup in 1975, having beaten Burnley in the third round, at that time one of the strongest clubs in Britain. It was the first victory by a non-League club at the ground of a First Division team for 54 years. In the fourth round, they travelled to Elland Road and held the mighty Leeds United, then League Champions, to a heroic goal-less draw before narrowly losing the replay 0–1 due to a deflected own goal from Dave Bassett.

Only six months after achieving Football League status, Batsford resigned from Wimbledon following disagreements with the club chairman, Ron Noades, and was succeeded by team coach Dario Gradi.

Batsford then returned to managing in non-league football, first with a short stint at Hillingdon Borough before thriving once more with Wealdstone, whose squad included the future England international Stuart Pearce. In 1981–82, Batsford led Wealdstone to success in both the Southern League's championship, which secured promotion to the Alliance Premier League (the equivalent of the current National League), Southern Football League Cup, Championship Shield, Championship Cup and then to third place in their first season in the Alliance. In the 1984–85 season, the club, now under the management of Batsford's assistant and former Wimbledon coach Brian Hall, became the first in history to achieve the non-league double of being Alliance Premier League champions and FA Trophy winners.

== Later career ==
Batsford suffered heart trouble and decided to leave Wealdstone, but he recovered sufficiently to coach at Queen's Park Rangers, then serve as general manager of Dulwich Hamlet before running the Millwall youth team again and also acting as a talent scout for Dave Bassett during his former protégé's managerial stints with Watford, Sheffield United and Nottingham Forest. In 2004–05 he held the honorary position of President of his first club, Walton & Hersham.

== Death ==
He died at the age of 77 having suffered a fatal heart attack on his way home from watching Chelsea play Fulham at Stamford Bridge.
