= Eddie Reynolds =

Northern Irish footballer

Eddie Reynolds (c. 1935 – 1993) was a Northern Irish footballer.

Eddie Reynolds joined Wimbledon FC from Tooting & Mitcham United FC during the 1957/58 season, scored 17 goals in 20 appearances in his first season and remained a prolific goalscorer for the next seven seasons. His career at Wimbledon saw the club win the Isthmian League title four times (including three years in succession: 61/2, 62/3, and 63/4) and the FA Amateur Cup in 62/3. In his last full season for the Dons, 1964/65 (Wimbledon's first season in the Southern League), he scored 57 goals in just 49 appearances – plus another 10 goals for the reserves. He scored in his final game against Worcester City in January 1966, was then transferred to Ashford Town and finally moved to Northern Ireland where he played for Derry City FC.

His most memorable feat was when he headed all four of Wimbledon's goals in their 4-2 FA Amateur Cup win over Sutton United in May 1963. He remains the only player in history ever to have scored four goals all with his head in a Wembley cup final.

Wimbledon's former Plough Lane stadium, which closed in 1991, was redeveloped as a housing estate in 2008 and named Reynolds Gate in his honour. Reynolds died in 1993 after a short illness.
