= Stuart Murdoch (football manager) =

English footballer and manager

Personal information
- Date of birth: 17 August 1950 (age 76)
- Place of birth: Blackpool, England
- Position: Goalkeeper

Senior career*
Years	Team	Apps	(Gls)
1968–1971	Fleetwood	48	(0)
1971–1974	Lancaster City		
1974–1975	Fleetwood	25	(0)

Managerial career
- 2002–2004: Wimbledon
- 2004: Milton Keynes Dons
- 2006: AFC Bournemouth (caretaker)
- * Club domestic league appearances and goals

Stuart Murdoch (born 17 August 1950) is a football coach. He is perhaps best known for his spell as manager of Wimbledon between May 2002 and June 2004, during which time the team moved to Milton Keynes in 2003. Wimbledon were renamed Milton Keynes Dons by the new owner in 2004 and Murdoch remained in charge until November of that year.

== Playing career ==
Murdoch played as a goalkeeper for Fleetwood in two spells either side of a spell at Lancaster City.

== Coaching career ==
Murdoch worked with Glenn Roeder at Watford before moving to Wimbledon in 1996 as goalkeeping coach.

He was appointed as manager of Wimbledon in June 2002 after a successful spell as caretaker. He replaced Terry Burton, who had criticised the club's owners over the proposed move to Milton Keynes. Murdoch led Wimbledon to tenth in the First Division in the 2002–03 season, despite a number of supporters boycotting Wimbledon's matches in protest against the proposed move. At the end of the season, the club was placed into administration and a number of the club's players were sold off.

Murdoch remained in charge at Wimbledon throughout the 2003–04 season. The club moved to the former National Hockey Stadium in Milton Keynes, and were relegated, finishing bottom of the First Division and suffered the longest run of defeats at this level. In the summer, the club was renamed Milton Keynes Dons but the club's on-pitch fortunes remained poor. Murdoch was fired in November 2004, with the club in the relegation zone of League One.

In July 2005, Murdoch joined AFC Bournemouth as part-time goalkeeping coach. He was appointed joint caretaker manager, with Joe Roach, in September 2006 and held the post until Kevin Bond took over in October. He returned to his original role as goalkeeping coach after this. He moved to Norwich City as goalkeeping coach in January 2008, linking up again with Norwich boss Glenn Roeder. Murdoch left this role after just four days, citing personal reasons. Later that month he linked up with Kenny Jackett, with whom he had worked at Watford, to become chief scout at Millwall.

On 1 August 2009, Southampton announced that Murdoch had been appointed as a part-time goalkeeping coach and scout, but he was "relieved of his duties" along with Alan Pardew on 30 August 2010. He took up a similar role at Gillingham in November 2010.

Just over eight years after leaving MK Dons, Murdoch has claimed his position as the manager during Wimbledon's move to Milton Keynes is the reason he has never had a permanent managerial position since.

He was appointed as director of football at Fleetwood Town in April 2014 shortly before the club gained promotion to League 1. In 2016 he was instrumental in setting up the clubs’ Cat 3 Academy and has held various roles at the club since.
