= Ian Cooke (footballer) =

English footballer

Personal information
- Place of birth: England
- Position: Forward

Senior career*
Years	Team	Apps	(Gls)
1963–1977	Wimbledon	427	(191)
- * Club domestic league appearances and goals

Ian Cooke is an English former professional footballer who played for Wimbledon for his entire career.

== Playing career ==
Cooke joined the amateur Isthmian League club Wimbledon in 1963, and played in the club's final two amateur matches a year later. Wimbledon turned professional in 1964, and Cooke's employers, Westminster Bank, initially refused to let him sign for the club. Wimbledon eventually managed to secure Cooke's signature, and the young forward had made eight appearances by the end of the 1964–65 season. Cooke broke into the side during the following season, and scored 29 goals in 44 matches to be Wimbledon's top scorer, something he would remain for six out of the next seven seasons. Cooke later became captain of Wimbledon, and moved back into midfield during his later years as a player; taking part in Wimbledon's final season as a non-League club, Cooke's career finally ended in 1977, just before Wimbledon's election to The Football League. Cooke made the second highest number of appearances for Wimbledon, with 615; his 297 goals was also the second highest number scored for the club.

== Post-playing career ==
Cooke later became a director of AFC Wimbledon, the club founded by supporters in 2002 after approval had been given to Wimbledon F.C.'s relocation to Milton Keynes.
