= Wimbledon F.C. =

English football club (1889–2004)

Wimbledon
- Full name: Wimbledon Football Club
- Nicknames: The Dons, The Wombles, The Crazy Gang
- Founded: 1889 (as Wimbledon Old Centrals) (Note: The club's official name on its formation was "Wimbledon Old Central Football Club", but they were commonly called "Wimbledon Old Centrals".)
- Dissolved: 21 June 2004 (Note: In terms of its footballing assets and place in the English football league structure, Milton Keynes Dons is the continuation of Wimbledon, which was formed in south London in 1889 and relocated to Milton Keynes in 2003. The club was brought out of administration in 2004 as a new company, Milton Keynes Dons Ltd, which purchased the assets of The Wimbledon Football Club Ltd and received the team's place in Football League One. The Wimbledon Football Club Ltd legally endured until 2009. Since 2006 Milton Keynes Dons has officially considered itself a new club, formed in 2004; it no longer claims any history before then, despite retaining Wimbledon's "Dons" nickname.) (Relocated to Milton Keynes to become Milton Keynes Dons)
- Ground: Plough Lane (1912–1991); Selhurst Park (1991–2003); National Hockey Stadium (2003–04)
- 2003–04: First Division, 24th of 24 (Relegated)

Wimbledon Football Club was an English football club formed in Wimbledon, southwest London, in 1889 and based at Plough Lane from 1912 to 1991. Founded as Wimbledon Old Centrals, the club were a non-League team for most of their history. Nicknamed "the Dons" and latterly also "the Wombles", they won eight Isthmian League titles, the FA Amateur Cup in 1963 and three successive Southern League championships between 1975 and 1977, and were then elected to the Football League. The team rose quickly from obscurity during the 1980s and were promoted to the then top-flight First Division in 1986, just four seasons after being in the Fourth Division.

Wimbledon's "Crazy Gang"—so-called because of the boisterous, eccentric behaviour of the players—won the FA Cup in 1988, beating that season's League champions Liverpool, and thereby became one of only three clubs to have won both the FA Cup and its amateur counterpart. (Note: The others are Old Carthusians and Royal Engineers.) In 1991, following the publication of the Taylor Report recommending all-seater grounds for top-flight clubs, Wimbledon left Plough Lane to groundshare with nearby Crystal Palace at Selhurst Park - originally a temporary arrangement that ended up lasting over a decade. The team remained in the First Division and its successor, the FA Premier League, until they were relegated in 2000.

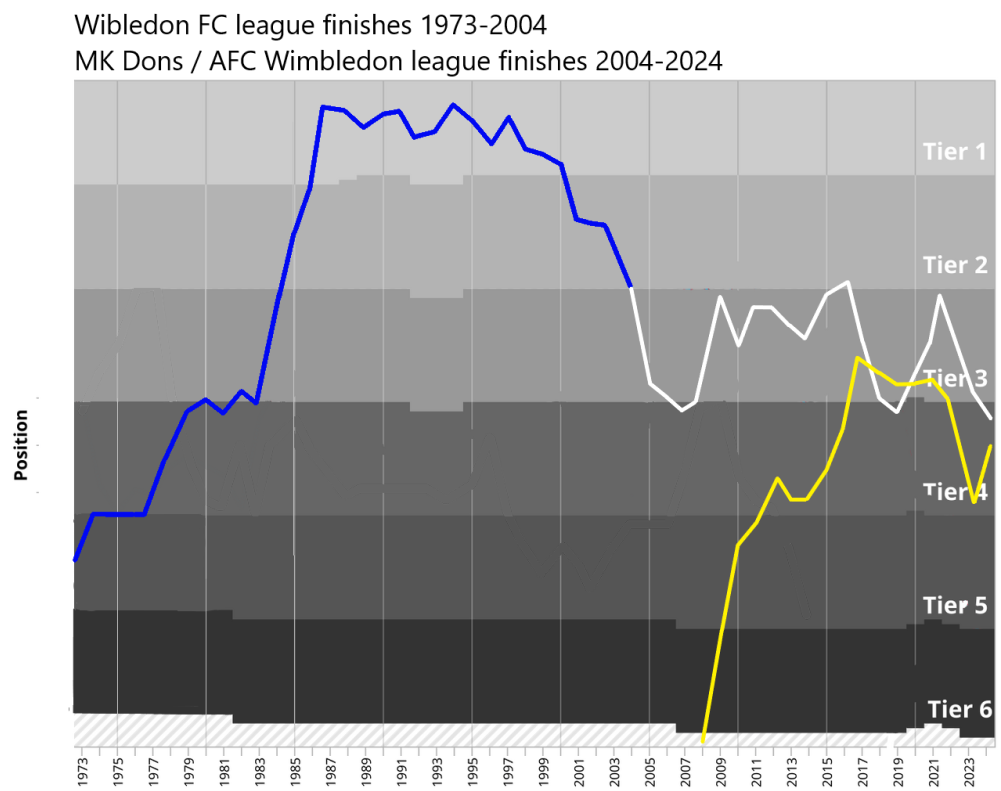
Wimbledon FC Seasons + MK Dons and AFC Wimbledon

In 2001, after rejecting a variety of possible local sites and others further afield, the club announced its intention to move 46 miles (74 km) north to Milton Keynes in Buckinghamshire. The idea of Wimbledon leaving south London was deeply unpopular, both with the bulk of the club's established fanbase and with football supporters generally, but an independent commission appointed by the Football Association granted permission in May 2002. A group of supporters, appalled by the decision, responded by forming a new club, AFC Wimbledon, to which the majority of Wimbledon fans switched allegiance. The move went ahead and Wimbledon played home games in Milton Keynes in the 2003–2004 season; Milton Keynes Dons would compete in the football League from 2004 onwards.

== History ==
=== Non-League beginnings ===
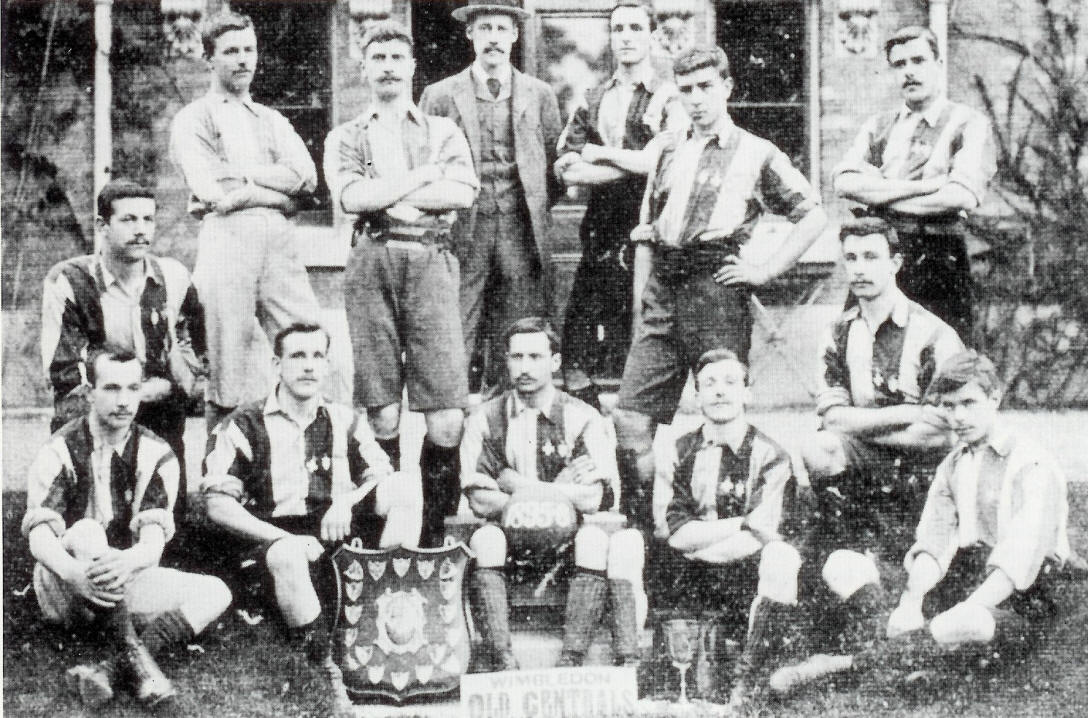
The Wimbledon Old Centrals of 1895–96

Wimbledon Old Central Football Club formed in 1889, taking its name from the Old Central School on Wimbledon Common where players had been pupils. The club's first match was a 1‍–‍0 victory over Westminster, and it took only seven years for success to come to Wimbledon as they won both the Clapham League and the Herald League in 1895‍–‍96. Wimbledon won the Clapham League again in 1900‍–‍01, as well as two minor trophies. At a meeting convened on 1 May 1905, the decision was taken to drop "Old Central" from the club's name, and under its new name Wimbledon Football Club won the South London Charity Cup the same year; however, excessive debts caused the club to fold in 1910. A year later, the club was restarted under the name Wimbledon Borough, though 'Borough' was dropped from the team's name after barely a year. They continued to play on Wimbledon Common and at various other locations in the Wimbledon area until 1912, when the side settled at Plough Lane. Wimbledon joined the Athenian League for 1919‍–‍20, and finished as runners-up in their second season in the new division. The club then joined the Isthmian League and began to prosper, winning four Isthmian League titles during the 1930s and reaching the FA Amateur Cup final in 1934‍–‍35. The club reached another FA Amateur Cup final in 1946‍–‍47 and twice finished as runners-up in the league over the next few seasons.

Wimbledon won the Isthmian League for the fifth time in 1958‍–‍59 before starting a period of domination that saw three successive championships: 1961‍–‍62, 1962‍–‍63 and 1963‍–‍64. Wimbledon also lifted the FA Amateur Cup in 1962‍–‍63, beating Sutton United 4‍–‍2; the club's all-time top goalscorer, Eddie Reynolds, scored all four Wimbledon goals with his head, and in doing so became the only player to have headed in all four of his side's goals in a Wembley match – as of 2025, still a unique feat. Following these successes, the decision was taken for the club to turn professional for the 1964‍–‍65 season and to enter the Southern League. Wimbledon's success continued in their new league, and the team finished as runners-up at the first attempt. Wimbledon became nationally famous during an FA Cup run during the 1974‍–‍75 season; entering the competition at the first qualifying round, Wimbledon defeated Bracknell Town, then Maidenhead United, Wokingham Town, Guildford & Dorking United, Bath City and Kettering Town to find themselves in the third round proper. They then became the first non-League team of the 20th century to beat a First Division side away from home by defeating Burnley at Turf Moor. Their good form continued in the fourth round, as the team held the reigning First Division champions Leeds United to a 0‍–‍0 draw at Elland Road. Goalkeeper Dickie Guy saved a penalty from Peter Lorimer to earn a replay, which was narrowly lost 1‍–‍0 by an own goal in front of over 40,000 spectators at Selhurst Park. After winning the Southern League three times running, from 1974‍–‍75 to 1976‍–‍77, Wimbledon were elected to the Football League in place of Workington for the 1977‍–‍78 season.

=== The Football League ===
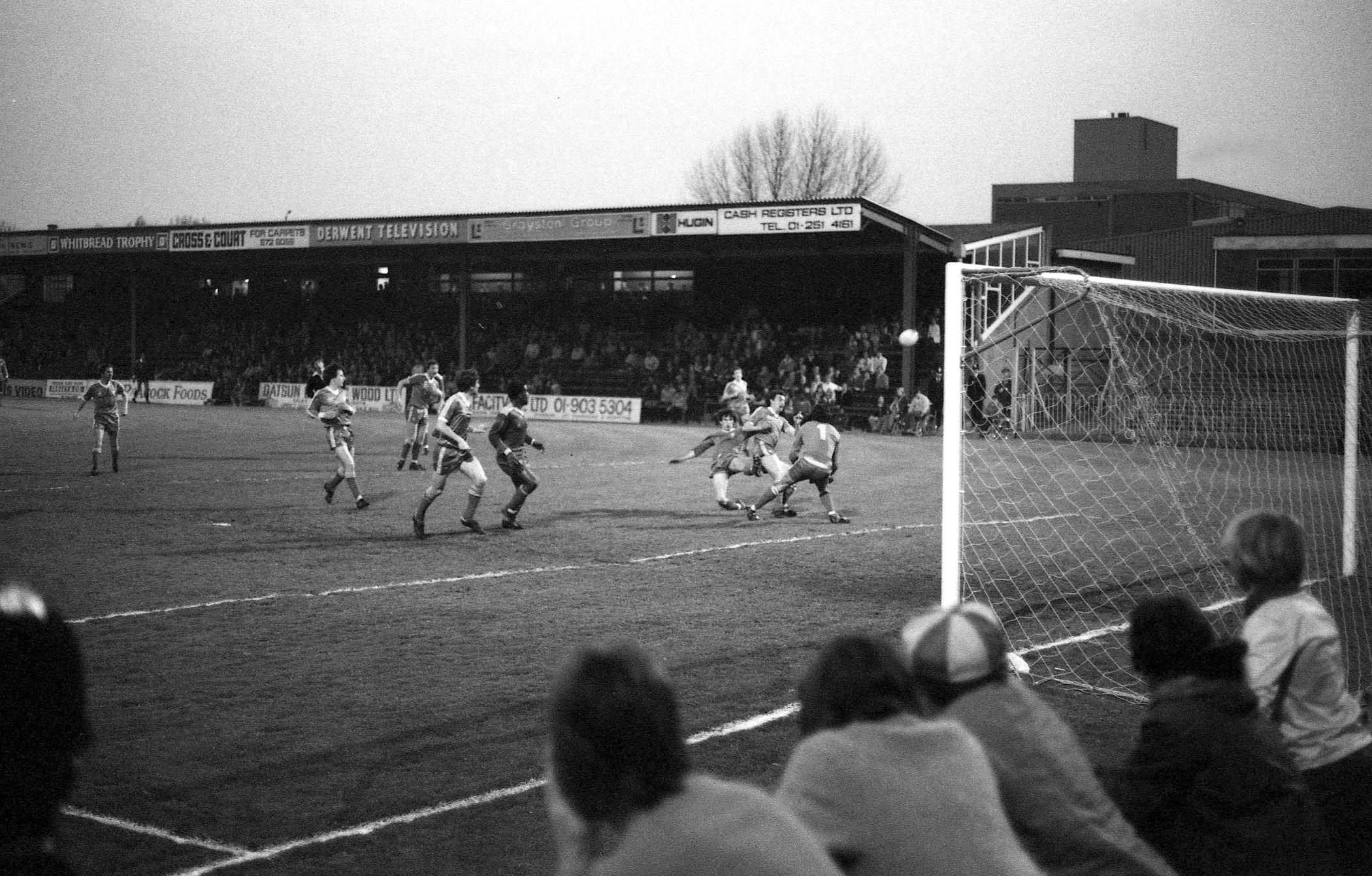
Wimbledon take on Oxford United at Plough Lane in a Third Division match during 1981–82

The 1977–78 season was a satisfactory Football League debut for Wimbledon, who finished 13th in the Fourth Division. Allen Batsford had resigned as manager on 2 January 1978 to be succeeded by Dario Gradi, who guided the club to promotion in 1978‍–‍79. Wimbledon's first stay in the Third Division was not a successful one. The team struggled, and were relegated in bottom place, winning just 10 league games all season. Following relegation, relocation to Milton Keynes was considered – chairman Ron Noades entered talks with the Milton Keynes Development Corporation about the possibility of moving the club to the new town, but the plan was never executed.

Still in south London, 1980–81 saw Wimbledon regain Third Division status at the first attempt, at the end of an eventful season which saw chairman Ron Noades walk out of the club to take over Crystal Palace, taking manager Dario Gradi to Selhurst Park with him. At Plough Lane, assistant manager Dave Bassett was promoted to manager. Under Bassett, Wimbledon were relegated in 22nd place. Just before the survival battle was lost, injured defender Dave Clement committed suicide. Wimbledon once again regained Third Division status at the first time of asking, triumphing as Fourth Division champions in 1982‍–‍83, and in the next season the Wimbledon players continued to excel as they achieved a second promotion to the Second Division after finishing runners-up with 97 league goals.

1984–85 was Wimbledon's first season in the Second Division, and everyone at the club was prepared for long and hard struggle to preserve this status. A 12th-place finish was more than satisfactory for a club that was playing at this level for the first time. The next year started well for Wimbledon as Middlesbrough were defeated 3‍–‍0 on the opening day of the season – the team was soon looking like a contender for promotion. Promotion in third place was sealed on the final day of the season with an away victory at Huddersfield Town. Thus, Wimbledon had reached the First Division, only four years after playing in the Fourth Division and nine years after being elected into The Football League.

=== First Division football and an FA Cup triumph ===
Many observers tipped Wimbledon to go straight back down in 1986‍–‍87, but after losing the first game of the season away at Manchester City, Wimbledon won the next four games to perch atop the league table on 1 September. Wimbledon eventually finished sixth, before Dave Bassett moved on to Watford. His successor was Bristol Rovers manager Bobby Gould. Dubbed "The Crazy Gang" because of the eccentric behaviour of its players, fans and chairman, Sam Hammam, the club's greatest moment came in 1988 when, very much against expectation, the team won the FA Cup, beating overwhelming favourites Liverpool 1‍–‍0 with a goal from Lawrie Sanchez. 37,000 Wimbledon fans witnessed captain Dave Beasant becoming the first goalkeeper to save a penalty in an FA Cup final, stopping John Aldridge's shot. The only downside of this triumph was that the club would not be able to compete in the European Cup Winners' Cup, as the ban on English teams from European competition following the Heysel Stadium Disaster was still in operation at this time. Wimbledon also finished seventh in the league this season.

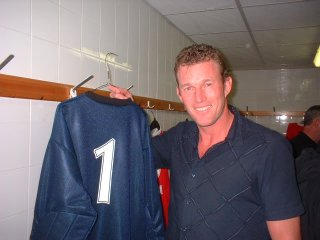
Cup-winning captain and goalkeeper Dave Beasant, pictured in 2003

Just days after the FA Cup triumph, Wimbledon directors announced plans to build a new all-seater stadium in the club's home borough of Merton. In the season following the FA Cup triumph, Gould steered Wimbledon to a secure 12th-place finish in the First Division, and in 1989‍–‍90 the side finished eighth. Despite these successes, Bobby Gould was replaced in the summer of 1990 by Ray Harford, who in the same year as Wimbledon's FA Cup triumph had guided Luton Town to victory in the League Cup. Under Harford's management, defender Warren Barton was purchased for £300,000 while Wimbledon had another strong season in 1990‍–‍91, finishing seventh.

Nothing came of the plans for a new ground and at the end of 1990‍–‍91 the club's board decided that Plough Lane was beyond redevelopment to meet with new legislation from the Taylor Report, requiring all-seater stadiums. Consequently, the club moved to Selhurst Park before the 1991‍–‍92 season, ground-sharing with Crystal Palace. Harford suddenly resigned in October 1991, with the Dons in the top half of the table, to be replaced by Peter Withe. Withe lasted until just after the turn of the new year, winning just one league game in three months. Joe Kinnear was promoted from the role of youth team coach, initially taking over as interim manager and overseeing strong form which lifted the club out of the relegation. After guiding Wimbledon to 13th place in the First Division and booking a place in the inaugural FA Premier League, Kinnear got the manager's job on a permanent basis.

During Wimbledon's first six seasons in the top flight, they had not only managed to survive among the elite and win the FA Cup, but had also managed to finish above the likes of Everton, Manchester United and Tottenham Hotspur.

=== The early Premier League seasons ===
1992–93 began as a struggle for Wimbledon – the club were third from bottom on Boxing Day. However, the team recovered well in the new year and finished 12th. The next season was an even greater success as the side finished sixth in the FA Premier League - two places above Liverpool - and reached the quarter-finals of the League Cup. Wimbledon remained hard to beat in 1994‍–‍95, finishing ninth in the league. During the close season the Dons made their first and only appearance in a UEFA European competition, being required by the FA to enter the Intertoto Cup. However, after fielding an under-strength side containing reserves, youth team players and unsigned trialists in their group stage games, the club – along with Tottenham Hotspur – were banned from European competition for the following season. Not that it mattered; after losing Barton to Newcastle, 1995‍–‍96 saw a drop to 14th. Wimbledon made a fine start to the 1996‍–‍97 campaign – after losing the first three fixtures, the players proceeded to win their next seven and reach second place in the FA Premier League a few weeks before Christmas. By February, it looked as though the Dons might be on the brink of another trophy win when they eliminated Manchester United from the FA Cup – Wimbledon reached both the FA Cup semi-finals and the semi-finals of the League Cup. Wimbledon's were still in contention for a European place even after their cup exits, but these hopes ended when they could only manage an eighth-place finish.

=== Relegation and relocation ===
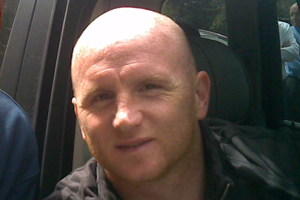
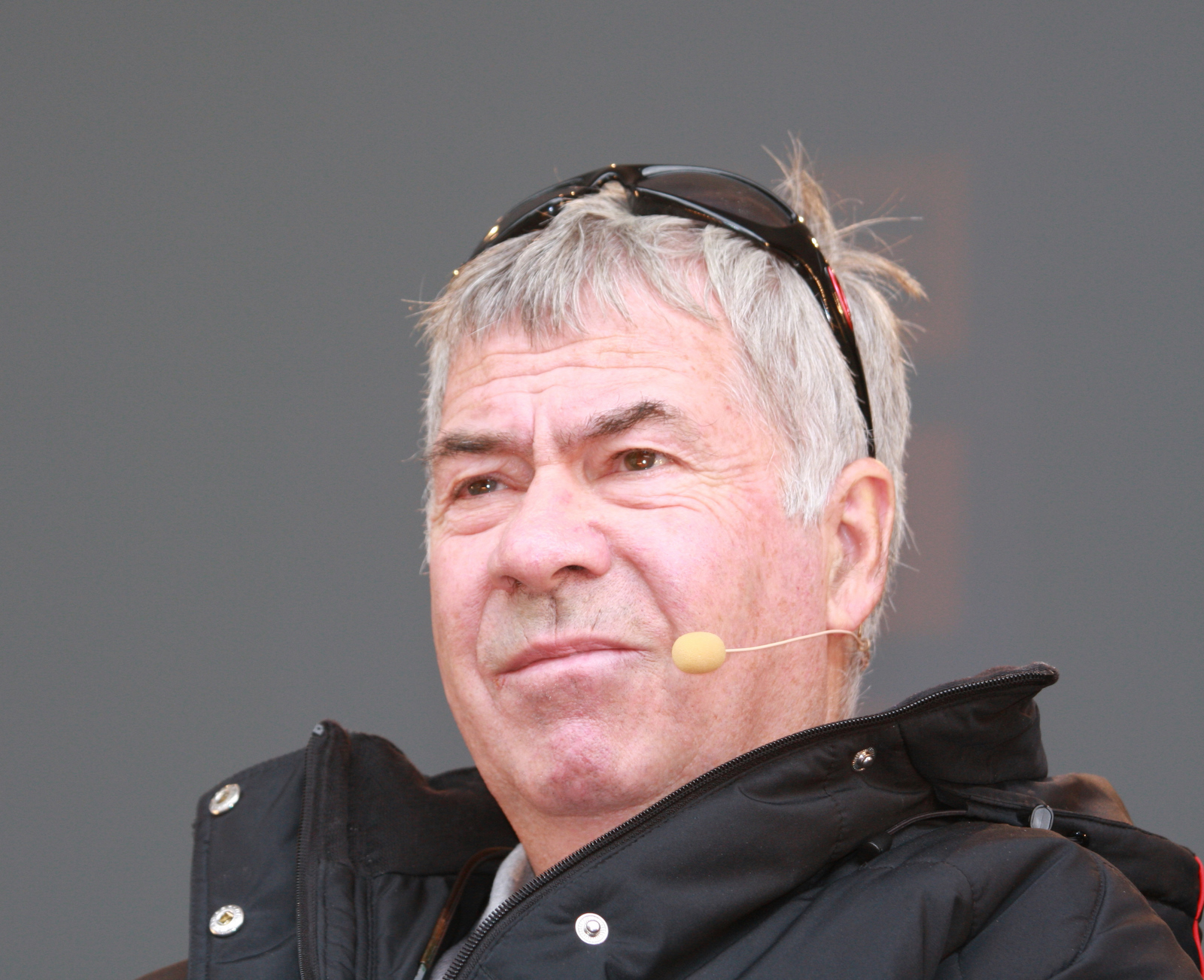
John Hartson (left, pictured in 2007) and Egil Olsen (right, seen in 2010) joined the club as player and manager respectively in 1999 and were involved during the 1999‍–‍2000 season, Wimbledon's last in the Premier League. Olsen left the side in May 2000, just before relegation, while Hartson remained with the side until February 2001.

The 1997–98 season looked highly promising for Wimbledon as late on as Christmas, as the team were regularly in the top five. However, the side's form in the second half of the season was less impressive, and the club dipped to 15th place in the final table – the lowest finish yet for Wimbledon in the top flight. A similar pattern followed in 1998‍–‍99 – a good start followed by a slump. As late on as mid-March, the team were on the fringe of a UEFA Cup place. The club record signing of West Ham United striker John Hartson boosted hopes of success for Wimbledon, but a terrible run of form in the final weeks of the season saw the side dip to 16th in the final table. Wimbledon again reached the League Cup semi-finals that season – losing to eventual winners Tottenham Hotspur.

Joe Kinnear stepped down as manager in June 1999 due to ill health, and was succeeded by Norwegian coach Egil Olsen. Wimbledon reached the quarter-finals of the League Cup, but the team's league form slowly deteriorated during the second half of the season. Olsen left in early May with the club threatened by relegation. Long-serving coach Terry Burton took over, but on 14 May 2000, 12 years to the day after the FA Cup win, the side was relegated from the top flight after 14 years after a 2‍–‍0 defeat at Southampton and a 1‍–‍0 win for Bradford City over Liverpool. Burton remained manager of Wimbledon for two seasons in the second tier before he was sacked at the end of 2001‍–‍02 after the club had narrowly missed out on the promotion play-offs two seasons in a row.

=== Relocation, renaming, and foundation of AFC Wimbledon ===
In August 2001, the club announced its intent to relocate to Milton Keynes. Despite opposition from Wimbledon fans, The Football League, and The Football Association, they were given permission to do so on 28 May 2002 after a 2‍–‍1 vote by the three-person, independent commission appointed by the F.A. The approval of the decision to move the club caused supporters who were against the move to found a new club, AFC Wimbledon, to which most Wimbledon fans switched their allegiance; gates at the new club were over 3,500, compared with 2,500 or less for the relocated club.

Goalkeeping coach Stuart Murdoch was promoted to manager, and as attendances plummeted, Murdoch's team finished 10th in the league during the club's last full season at Selhurst Park. Wimbledon entered administration in June 2003, and played their first match in Milton Keynes in September. The administrator in charge of the club's financial affairs sold any player who could command a transfer fee and Murdoch's team finished at the bottom of the league.

The club were brought out of administration at the end of the 2003‍–‍04 season, and Milton Keynes Dons was formed in the club's place.

== Club identity ==
The kit worn in the 1988 FA Cup Final

The club's nickname was the Dons, though the club were also often referred to in the media as the Wombles from the mid-1970s onwards. Following the FA Cup victory in 1988, the term Crazy Gang also started to be applied; originally to the players, though over time to the club as a whole. The club introduced a character mascot in 2000, a Womble named Wandle the Womble. However, following the relocation of the club in 2003, the owners of the Wombles brand refused to renew the licensing agreement in protest at the move. Three years later, a deal was agreed that saw a similar character named Haydon the Womble appear at AFC Wimbledon.

The colours most associated with the club were blue and yellow. The club's first colours were navy blue and white, though the kit changed several times soon after the club's foundation, between combinations of: brown and blue striped shirts with navy blue shorts; green and white striped shirts with navy blue shorts; green shirts and black shorts; white shirts with navy blue shorts, and finally green and black striped shirts with black shorts. Royal blue shirts with navy blue shorts and socks were finally settled upon in 1918, initially bearing a "W" (for Wimbledon) in the centre of the chest. Wimbledon players then regularly wore royal blue shirts with black shorts and socks until a shift in the 1950s saw the shorts change from black to white. A combination of blue shirts, blue shorts and white socks was introduced in 1966, before being abandoned a year later in favour of an all-blue outfit. The white socks returned in 1970. A blue and yellow combination was first used in 1975, but was replaced after a year with an all-white outfit trimmed with blue, and this was the kit in which the club played its first season in the Football League. In 1978, Yellow shirts, blue shorts and yellow socks were adopted, before the club made the change to an all-blue strip with yellow markings in 1981. The kit underwent only minor changes until 1993, when a darker, deep navy blue replaced the royal blue shade that had been used for the previous twelve years. Wimbledon wore these colours for the remainder of their history. As for change colours, a red kit, with black trim, was a frequent choice in the 1990s. The club had a green away kit for the 2000‍–‍01 season.

Wimbledon's final proposed logo, adopted before the 2003–04 season but not used on playing kit

The first crest the club wore was the emblem of the Municipal Borough of Wimbledon. This emblem appeared on Wimbledon shirts from the late 1920s until the mid-1950s, when no badge was worn. The coat of arms returned in the early 1970s, before the club adopted its own badge on election to The Football League in 1977. The crest was very similar to the badge most commonly associated with the club – the difference being the inclusion of white rather than yellow. Yellow replaced white in 1981, and this logo was used until 2003. After the club's relocation to Milton Keynes was confirmed in May 2002, the College of Arms informed the club in August 2002 that its continued use of the Borough arms was illegal. A replacement, given the go-ahead on 12 April 2003, featured a stylised eagle's head – an element from the Wimbledon arms – drawn in navy blue and yellow outline, the yellow forming a stylised rendering of the letters "MK" (for Milton Keynes). Despite being officially adopted in April 2003, the logo's use was inconsistent: the club officially announced that it would be used "on all club kit, merchandise and literature from the start of [the 2003‍–‍04] season", including on a new white away kit and on an amended version of the previous season's home outfit, but this never occurred; both the home and away colours from 2002 to 2003 were retained for the following year with the municipal arms still present. Moreover, the old crest continued to appear on official club statements and literature towards the end of the 2003‍–‍04 season, making the status of the new badge ambiguous at best.

== Mascot ==
From 2000 to June 2003, the original Wimbledon had used a Womble mascot named "Wandle", named after the local River Wandle, as a club mascot. However, in light of the controversy over the moving of the club to Milton Keynes, the legal licence to use the character was withdrawn by the Wombles' creator, Elisabeth Beresford, in protest at the nature of the club's relocation.

== Stadium ==
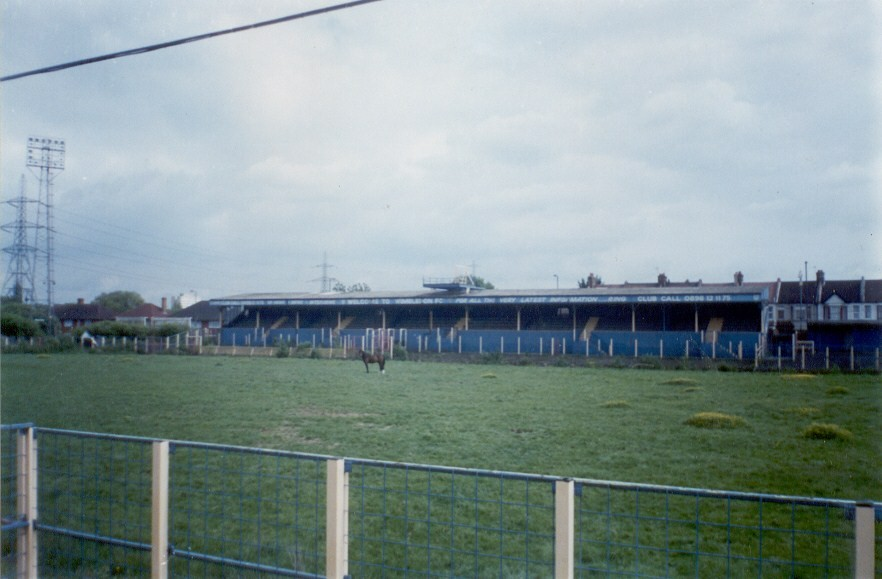
Plough Lane's South Stand, pictured in 2000

Wimbledon originally played on Wimbledon Common, using the Fox and Grapes public house in Camp Road as the team's headquarters and changing room. The club moved to Plough Lane in September 1912. During the 1930s and 1940s, crowds of between 7,000 and 10,000 were not uncommon at the ground. Wimbledon's highest attendance at the ground came on 2 March 1935, when 18,080 people were attracted to an FA Amateur Cup tie against HMS Victory. Floodlights were first used on 3 October 1960 in a London Charity Cup match against Arsenal.

The Plough Lane ground remained comparatively basic, and by the time the club had risen to the First Division the stadium had not changed greatly from Wimbledon's recent non-league days. At the time of the club's acceptance into the Football League in 1977, applicants had only to meet minimal stadium criteria, and once in the League these same criteria sufficed regardless of whether the club subsequently found itself in the Fourth or First Division. However, following the Hillsborough disaster and the subsequent Taylor Report, the football authorities introduced far stricter safety rules, which gave top-flight clubs specific deadlines by which to redevelop terraced grounds or to build new all-seater stadiums. The board of the club decided that Plough Lane could not be made to comply with these new requirements economically and, in 1990, they announced plans to temporarily groundshare with Crystal Palace at their Selhurst Park stadium.

Given the location of the Plough Lane ground, at the junction of two major roads and beside the River Wandle, major redevelopment of the site as a modern all-seater stadium might have been difficult, though not impossible. The club's board of directors maintained that it had "searched exhaustively with Merton Council" for a site in or around Merton on which to build a new stadium, looking at "14 different sites over a period of five years", in addition to commissioning feasibility studies for redeveloping both Plough Lane and the neighbouring site at Wimbledon Stadium. Despite this, nothing ever became of the board's continual promises to redevelop the site or to build a new ground within the borough, and the club remained as tenants at Selhurst Park for twelve years.

Wimbledon's first match at the National Hockey Stadium in Milton Keynes was played on 27 September 2003. The club remained there for the rest of its final season, and the ground became the first home of Milton Keynes Dons.

Period	Stadium	Borough/Town
1889–1912	Wimbledon Common	Merton
1912–1991	Plough Lane	Merton
1991–2003	Selhurst Park	Croydon
2003–2004	National Hockey Stadium	Milton Keynes

== Supporters ==
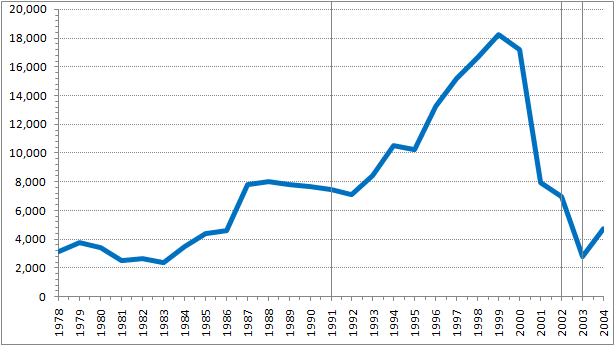
Average home league attendances from joining the Football League in 1977 to 2004. The three vertical lines on the graph (from left to right) represent: (1991) – Move to Selhurst Park (2002) – Confirmation of move to Milton Keynes (2003) – Move to Milton Keynes

Due to Plough Lane's modest capacity and Wimbledon's unprecedented rise from non-League football to the First Division in under ten years, the club had a much lower level of support than its top-flight rivals. During Wimbledon's first season in the Football League, Wimbledon's average attendance was only 3,135 – however, by the club's appearance in the top flight nine years later the average attendance had risen by 149% to 7,811. Attendances did not immediately change much following the move to Selhurst Park in 1991 – however, the larger capacity gradually started to be used. Average crowds peaked at 18,235 in 1998‍–‍99, and during the next season, the team's final year in the FA Premier League, home crowds averaged 17,157. With relegation, attendances dropped to an average of only 7,897 during 2000‍–‍01 as organized supporter boycotts of matches in protest at the proposed relocation took effect. Wimbledon averaged 6,961 during the final season before the club's relocation to Milton Keynes was confirmed.

Following the sanctioning of the move, most of the team's support left in specific protest at the club's relocation, to follow AFC Wimbledon, the new club founded by Wimbledon supporters. During the 2002‍–‍03 season, AFC Wimbledon's first and Wimbledon's last full season in south London, average crowds at the new club were actually higher than those at the original club. Attendances during the 2003‍–‍04 season, Wimbledon's last, were higher than those at AFC Wimbledon: Wimbledon averaged 4,751 at the National Hockey Stadium, compared to AFC Wimbledon's 2,606.

The club had two main supporters organisations– the long established official Wimbledon Supporters Club, which was tied to the club, and the more radical Wimbledon Independent Supporters Association (WISA) which was founded in 1995. The WISA was instrumental in the organisation of the supporter boycotts at Selhurst Park, and in the formation of The Dons Trust in March 2002. This trust, created in part to oppose the relocation to Milton Keynes, helped the WISA to found AFC Wimbledon months after its own establishment. Both the WISA and The Dons Trust from this point became affiliated to AFC Wimbledon, while the official Wimbledon Supporters Club became defunct following the relocation.

== Rivalries ==
During much of Wimbledon's amateur and later semi-professional history, a strong local rivalry existed with neighbouring Tooting & Mitcham United.

From the mid-1980s, the club's main rivals were considered by fans to be fellow south London club Crystal Palace (who were their landlord from 1991 to 2003) and west London-based Chelsea; however, neither of these rivalries was seriously reciprocated. Wimbledon were in the same division as Palace for a total of 11 seasons between 1984 and 2004, and in the same division as Chelsea for all but one season between 1986 and 2000.

== Records and statistics ==
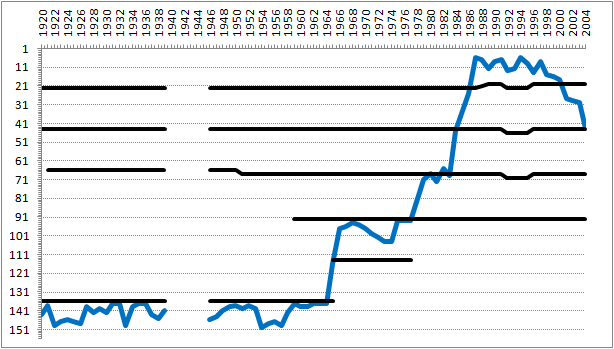
Wimbledon's progress through the English football league system from 1920 to 2004. Horizontal black lines represent (from top): 1 (post-1992) – Premier League 2–4 (1–4 pre-1992) – The Football League 4–6 – Southern Football League 6 – Athenian League; Isthmian League

The record for most appearances for Wimbledon was held by Roy Law, who turned out for the club 644 times between 1958 and 1972; Law's 433 league appearances was also a record. Wimbledon's all-time top goalscorer was Eddie Reynolds, who scored 340 goals in 329 matches between 1957 and 1966. The closest to Reynolds's record was Ian Cooke, who notched 297 between 1964 and 1977; Cooke also made the second highest total number of appearances for the team, having appeared 615 times in a Wimbledon shirt.

The records for most appearances and goals for Wimbledon in the Football League were both held by Alan Cork. Cork scored 145 league goals for the club in 430 matches. Cork also held the record for most Football League goals in a season, with 29 during 1983‍–‍84. Wimbledon's most capped player was Kenny Cunningham, who was capped 16 times for the Republic of Ireland during his time at the club. Wimbledon's most expensive signing was John Hartson, for whom the club paid West Ham United £7.5 million on 15 January 1999. The highest fee that the club received was the £7 million Newcastle United parted with to sign Carl Cort on 6 July 2000.

Wimbledon's best win was a 6–0 league victory over Newport County on 3 September 1983, while the worst defeat was an 8‍–‍0 League Cup defeat at Everton on 29 August 1978. Wimbledon's longest unbeaten league run was 22 matches between 15 January and 14 May 1984; the longest league run without a win, 14, was set between 19 March and 28 August 2000. Wimbledon's longest run of league wins was seven, set between 9 April and 7 May 1983 and matched from 4 September to 19 October 1996. Wimbledon's longest run of league defeats was the eleven matches lost in a row from 10 January to 27 March 2004.

Wimbledon's highest attendance, 30,115, was set on 9 May 1993 for the FA Premier League match against Manchester United at Selhurst Park but their official home attendance record is 18,080 vs HMS Victory in an FA Amateur Cup tie on 9 March 1935 at Plough Lane due to Selhurst Park being borrowed from Crystal Palace FC.

=== European record ===
Season	Competition	Round	Club	Home	Away
1995	Intertoto Cup	Group stage	(Turkey) Bursaspor	0–4^{1}	
1995	Intertoto Cup	Group stage	(Slovakia) Košice		1–1
1995	Intertoto Cup	Group stage	(Israel) Beitar Jerusalem	0–0^{1}	
1995	Intertoto Cup	Group stage	(Belgium) Charleroi		0–3

^{1}Both home matches in this competition were played at Brighton and Hove Albion's Goldstone Ground, as Selhurst Park was unavailable.

== Players ==
=== First team squad ===
The squad given here is made up of the players registered to the club on the date of Wimbledon's final league match (Wimbledon 1‍–‍0 Derby County, 9 May 2004). Updated 9 May 2004.

Note: Flags indicate national team as defined under FIFA eligibility rules; some limited exceptions apply. Players may hold more than one non-FIFA nationality.

No.	Pos.	Nation	Player
2	DF	ENG	Warren Barton
3	DF	ENG	Peter Hawkins
4	MF	ENG	Nick McKoy ^{[a]}
5	DF	NIR	Mark Williams ^{[a]}
6	DF	ENG	Darren Holloway (on loan to Scunthorpe United)
7	DF	FRA	Harry Ntimban-Zeh ^{[a]}
8	MF	ENG	Wade Small ^{[a]}
10	FW	ENG	Dean Holdsworth
12	GK	ENG	David Martin ^{[a]}
13	GK	ENG	Paul Heald ^{[a]}
14	FW	ENG	Lionel Morgan
15	FW	SLE	Albert Jarrett ^{[a]}
16	FW	SCO	Jamie Mackie ^{[a]}
17	DF	NGR	Shola Oyedele ^{[a]}

No.	Pos.	Nation	Player
18	FW	ENG	Wayne Gray
19	DF	ENG	Ben Chorley ^{[a]}
20	MF	ENG	Gary Smith (on loan from Middlesbrough)^{[a]}
21	DF	GER	Nico Herzig
22	MF	PHI	Rob Gier
23	MF	ENG	Alex Tapp ^{[a]}
24	DF	ENG	Jermaine Darlington ^{[b]}
25	DF	ENG	Dean Lewington ^{[a]}
26	MF	ENG	Jason Puncheon ^{[a]}
27	MF	ENG	Michael Gordon ^{[b]}
28	DF	SLE	Malvin Kamara ^{[a]}
29	MF	ENG	Ben Harding ^{[a]}
30	GK	WAL	Lee Worgan

a Denotes players who stayed on to play for Milton Keynes Dons^{[c]}
b Denotes players who later played for AFC Wimbledon^{[c]}
c Sourced to Soccerbase Archived 2 August 2009 at the Wayback Machine.

== Managers ==
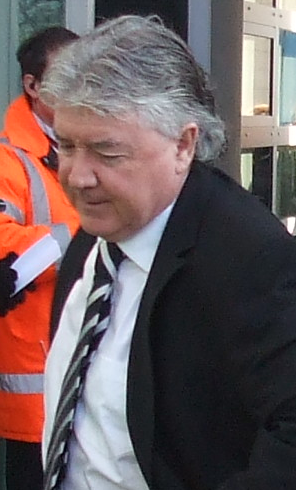
Joe Kinnear managed the club from 1992 to 1999.

Prior to the appointment of H. R. Watts as first team manager in 1930, a committee would deal with first team affairs, such as choosing the team on a matchday. Doc Dowden was appointed manager in 1946, and stayed in the position until leaving at the end of the 1954‍–‍55 season. Les Henley arrived in his place as first team coach, and stayed at the club for sixteen years in which the club progressed immensely, winning the FA Amateur Cup as well as three Isthmian League championships before turning professional and moving to the Southern League. However, in 1971 Henley was replaced by Mike Everitt, who arrived as player-manager. After two seasons, Everitt left to manage Brentford and Dick Graham arrived as a replacement. Graham remained until March 1974, and a replacement was not appointed until July of that year, when Allen Batsford was made manager. Batsford led Wimbledon to the Football League, but resigned only halfway through the first League season. Dario Gradi was made manager three days later, but after three seasons he too resigned. His replacement was Dave Bassett, who took Wimbledon to sixth in the First Division before moving to Watford. Bobby Gould spent three years as manager before being replaced by Ray Harford, who spent just over a season with Wimbledon. After Harford, Peter Withe had a spell as manager lasting only three months. Joe Kinnear was brought in during January 1992, and managed the club until leaving in 1999 due to ill health. A season was spent under Egil Olsen in which the team was relegated from the FA Premier League before Terry Burton was made manager. Burton's Wimbledon narrowly missed the play-offs twice in a row before he was sacked. Stuart Murdoch managed Wimbledon for the club's final two seasons.

Statistics apply to competitive league and cup matches only. Wartime matches excluded.

Name	Nationality	From	To	Matches	Won	Drawn	Lost	Win %	Notes
H.R. Watts	(England) English	1930	1946						
Doc Dowden	(England) English	1946	August 1955	375	186	64	126	49.6	
Les Henley	(England) English	August 1955	5 April 1971	869	468	156	235	53.9	
Mike Everitt	(England) English	5 April 1971	6 August 1973	120	49	26	45	40.8	
Dick Graham	(England) English	18 August 1973	16 March 1974	45	16	14	15	35.6	
Allen Batsford	(England) English	July 1974	2 January 1978	231	131	51	49	56.7	
Dario Gradi	(England) English	5 January 1978	24 January 1981	171	63	47	61	36.8	
Dave Bassett	(England) English	31 January 1981	17 June 1987	303	144	74	85	47.5	
Bobby Gould	(England) English	26 June 1987	18 June 1990	142	57	43	42	40.1	
Ray Harford	(England) English	18 June 1990	7 October 1991	56	20	17	19	35.7	
Peter Withe	(England) English	7 October 1991	19 January 1992	17	1	9	6	5.9	
Joe Kinnear	(Republic of Ireland) Irish	19 January 1992	9 June 1999	364	130	109	125	35.7	
Egil Olsen	(Norway) Norwegian	9 June 1999	1 May 2000	43	11	12	20	25.6	
Terry Burton	(England) English	1 May 2000	25 April 2002	108	39	39	30	36.1	
Stuart Murdoch	(England) English	25 June 2002	7 August 2004	101	30	17	54	29.7	(Note: Stuart Murdoch remained manager after the club was renamed Milton Keynes Dons. The date of MK Dons' first league match, 7 August 2004, was agreed upon in 2006 as the dividing line for statistical purposes.)

Managers from Dowden until Batsford sourced to: Jones, Marc. "AFCW Statistics". FOTO. Archived from the original on 23 April 2009.

Managers after Batsford sourced to: "Manager History for Wimbledon". Soccerbase. Centurycomm. Archived from the original on 3 August 2009.

== Honours ==
Wimbledon were a successful club even before election to the Football League, winning eight Isthmian League titles (including three in a row from 1962 to 1964) and three successive Southern League titles (from 1975 to 1977). Having also won the FA Amateur Cup in 1963, the run of Southern League titles prompted Football League election in 1977.

Even at the higher level, Wimbledon continued to collect honours; the most notable being the FA Cup victory in 1988, which made Wimbledon only the third club to have won both the FA Cup and its amateur equivalent. Despite swift success in The Football League, the club's rapid ascent combined with short spells in the Second and Third Divisions meant that the team only won a solitary divisional championship within the League – the Fourth Division title of 1982‍–‍83.

League

- Second Division (level 2)
  - Promoted: 1985–86
- Third Division (level 3)
  - Promoted: 1983–84
- Fourth Division (level 4)
  - Champions: 1982–83
  - Promoted: 1978–79, 1980–81
- Southern Football League
  - Champions: 1974–75, 1975–76, 1976–77
  - Runners-up: 1967–68
- Isthmian League
  - Champions: 1930–31, 1931–32, 1934–35, 1935–36, 1958–59, 1961–62, 1962–63, 1963–64
  - Runners-up: 1949–50, 1951–52
- Athenian League
  - Runners-up: 1920–21

Cup

- FA Cup
  - Winners: 1987–88
- FA Amateur Cup
  - Winners: 1962–63
  - Runners-up: 1934–35, 1946–47
- Football League Group Cup
  - Runners-up: 1981–82
- Anglo-Italian Cup
  - Runners-up: 1975–76
- London Senior Cup
  - Winners: 1930–31, 1933–34, 1961–62, 1974–75, 1976–77

== Notes and references ==
Footnotes
