= 1991–92 Liverpool F.C. season =

English football club season

Liverpool F.C.
1991–92 season
- Manager: Graeme Souness
- First Division: 6th
- FA Cup: Winners
- League Cup: Fourth round
- UEFA Cup: Quarter-finals
- Top goalscorer: League: Dean Saunders (10); All: Dean Saunders (23)
Home colours	Away colours

The 1991–92 Liverpool F.C. season was the 100th season in club history and Graeme Souness's first full season as manager of the club. The manager needed heart surgery in April, only to be present when Liverpool won the final of the FA Cup the following month. However, it was a disappointing season in the league for Liverpool, whose sixth-place finish was their first outside the top two since 1981.

Souness reshaped his side substantially over the close season. Out went older players including Peter Beardsley, David Speedie and Gary Gillespie as well as the young Steve Staunton, and in came £2.9million national record signing Dean Saunders from Derby County along with his Derby colleague, defender Mark Wright. He also forked out for Rangers midfielder Mark Walters and blooded in young talent in midfield in the shape of Steve McManaman and Jamie Redknapp, and just after the season began he drafted in Rob Jones from Fourth Division Crewe Alexandra, and within a few months the player, barely in his twenties, was representing England at senior level.

On his way out of Anfield halfway through the season was midfielder Steve McMahon to Manchester City, followed by defender Barry Venison to Newcastle United at the end of it. Mid season also saw the arrival of midfielder Michael Thomas from Arsenal, two and a half years after the player's goal for his former club had denied Liverpool the league title. Thomas ended the season by scoring one of Liverpool's two goals in the FA Cup final against Sunderland, the other coming from Ian Rush.

== Season overview ==
=== Preseason ===
As manager Graeme Souness prepared for his first full season as manager of Liverpool, a number of significant changes were made. The biggest stories of the summer were the arrival of Dean Saunders, the Derby County and Wales striker, for a national record fee of £2.9million, and Derby's centre-half Mark Wright for £2.2million. He bolstered the midfield with a £1.25million move for Rangers midfielder Mark Walters, bringing the 27-year-old Birmingham born player back to England four years after he left Aston Villa to move north of the border. Leaving the club were strikers David Speedie to Blackburn Rovers and Peter Beardsley to Everton. A surprise sale came when highly promising 22-year-old defender Steve Staunton moved to Aston Villa 10 days before the start of the season.

=== August ===
Liverpool's centenary season began at Anfield on 17 August 1991, where they beat Oldham Athletic (in the top flight for the first time since 1923) 2–1 in the opening First Division game. The next game was a disappointment as they lost 2–1 to Manchester City at Maine Road, but highly rated 19-year-old midfielder Steve McManaman managed to score his first goal for the club in this game.

Record signing Dean Saunders found the net for the first time on 27 August, scoring the only goal of a 1–0 home win over Queen's Park Rangers, Saunders had also missed a penalty in the match at Manchester City.

The month ended on a high as the Reds triumphed 3–1 over Everton in the Merseyside derby at Anfield.

=== September ===
September saw Liverpool disappoint in the league, losing at Leeds United, drawing with Aston Villa and Sheffield Wednesday, and only managing a narrow win at newly promoted relegation favourites Notts County.

There was more success on the European front, as Liverpool marked the end of their six-year ban by defeating Kuusysi Lahti 6–1 in the UEFA Cup first round first leg at Anfield, with Dean Saunders scoring four goals and Ray Houghton scoring twice.

On 23 September, winger John Barnes, a key part in Liverpool's successes since his arrival in 1987, was told that he would be out of action until at least January due to an achilles tendon injury. Although he did make a brief return to the side in the new year, he was soon out of action again.

=== October ===
Graeme Souness pulled off one of the biggest transfer bargains of the season when he paid Crewe Alexandra £300,000 for full-back Rob Jones. Jones, who turned 20 a month after arriving at Anfield, broke into the Liverpool first team almost instantly, and was capped by England after just four months of First Division football.

Liverpool's disappointing league form continued throughout October as they were held to draws by Manchester United and Chelsea and could only scrape a 1–0 win over struggling Coventry City, though there was better news in the cup competitions as they progressed to the next stage of the UEFA Cup and the League Cup, though they were held to a draw by Second Division strugglers Port Vale in the League Cup third round, and were left with an uphill struggle in the UEFA Cup after losing 2–0 to Auxerre of France in the second round first leg.

=== November ===
November began on a high note as Liverpool overturned Auxerre's 2–0 lead in the UEFA Cup to win the second leg 3–0. Their hopes of a quarter-final appearance were boosted at the end of the month when they won the third round first leg 2–0 win over Swarovski Tirol in Austria. The Reds also overcame Port Vale in the League Cup by winning the replay 4–1 at Vale Park.

However, there was little improvement in the league as a defeat by Crystal Palace and goalless draws at West Ham United and Wimbledon - both struggling at the wrong end of the First Division - left a league title win looking unlikely for this season. Their only league win of the month came when they beat Norwich City 2–1 at Anfield.

=== December ===
December began on a humiliating note for the Reds as they suffered a shock League Cup exit at the hands of Peterborough United in the fourth round, losing 1–0 to the Third Division underdogs at London Road.

They did, however, progress to the last eight of the UEFA Cup, beating Swarovski Tirol 4–0 in the third round second leg at Anfield with Dean Saunders scoring a hat-trick, taking his European tally to nine goals.

December brought little change in Liverpool's league fortunes, however. They went through the month unbeaten in the First Division, managing wins over Nottingham Forest and Tottenham Hotspur but being held to draws by Southampton (in a game where 18-year-old midfielder Jamie Redknapp scored his first Liverpool goal), Manchester City, QPR and last of all Everton in the Merseyside derby at Goodison Park. They ended 1991 in sixth place, with their great north western rivals Manchester United top of the pack with a two-point advantage and two games in hand over a resurgent Leeds United.

=== January ===
As the new year dawned, Liverpool began an upturn in league fortunes as they won all four of their games. There was also good news in the FA Cup as they travelled to Gresty Road to take on Fourth Division Crewe Alexandra, winning 4-0 and with John Barnes making an explosive - though ultimately brief - comeback from his absence by scoring a hat-trick.

Liverpool ended the month in third place, just eight points behind leaders Manchester United and six points behind second placed Leeds United, suggesting that they might still be able to win the title.

=== February ===
Liverpool managed to reach the FA Cup quarter-finals, but not without difficulty. The fourth round visit to Second Division underdogs Bristol Rovers saw them held to a 1–1 draw, and the replay at Anfield brought a narrow 2–1 win. The fifth round saw them travel to Suffolk for a clash with Ipswich Town - Second Division promotion contenders - which ended in a goalless draw. Once again, Liverpool won the Anfield replay, but it was also a narrow victory as they needed extra time to manage a 3–2 win as the score stood at 1–1 with 90 minutes on the clock.

After an excellent series of league results in January had raised hopes of a late run to the title, February was a disaster which effectively killed off talk of Liverpool winning the last old First Division title - as the top flight of English football would become the FA Premier League from the start of the 1992-93 season. The month began with a 2–1 home defeat by Chelsea, followed by a goalless draw at relegation threatened Coventry City and a 3-0 hammering at fellow strugglers Norwich City. The month ended with another struggling side, Southampton, paying a visit to Anfield, but neither side could find the net and the match ended as a goalless draw. The Reds ended the month fifth in the league, but were now 13 points adrift of leaders Manchester United with 12 games to go. It was now looking as though Liverpool would finish outside the top two for the first time since 1981, as 11 points separated them from second placed Leeds United.

=== March ===
A 4-1 aggregate defeat by Genoa of Italy in the UEFA Cup quarter-finals ended Liverpool's hopes of a glorious return to European football, but their last hope of silverware was kept alive when recently signed midfielder Michael Thomas - whose last minute goal against them for former club Arsenal had deprived them of title glory in 1989 - scored the only goal for a quarter-final win over Aston Villa in the FA Cup.

Liverpool's league form improved as they managed wins over West Ham United, Notts County and Tottenham Hotspur, but were defeated by Crystal Palace and Sheffield United, ensuring that they ended the month no higher than fourth in the league. The title was still a mathematical possibility as they trailed leaders Manchester United by 12 points with seven games remaining at the end of the month, but it now appeared a practical impossibility and Liverpool's efforts were now better focused on FA Cup success.

=== April ===
It had been a long and hard route for Liverpool in the FA Cup, but they finally did get to the FA Cup final. The semi-final draw paired them with Second Division Portsmouth, and the game was still deadlock with 90 minutes on the clock. The Hampshire side went ahead in extra time, and only a late equaliser by Ronnie Whelan prevented a defeat which would have sent Portsmouth through to the first non top division final to take on fellow Second Division side Sunderland.

Hours after the game, Liverpool manager Graeme Souness was rushed to hospital for an emergency triple heart bypass operation. He was still recovering in hospital eight days later when coach Ronnie Moran took charge of Liverpool for the FA Cup semi final replay, in which Portsmouth held the Reds to a goalless draw to force a penalty shoot-out which the Reds won.

By April, everyone at Liverpool appeared to have conceded the league title for this season, and focused their minds on winning the FA Cup. After a five-match winless run in the league, the month ended with a 2–0 home win over Manchester United - a result which handed the title to Leeds United.

=== May ===
On 9 May 1992, Liverpool travelled to Wembley Stadium for the FA Cup final. Their opponents were the 1973 FA Cup winners Sunderland of the Second Division, under interim manager Malcolm Crosby. Goals from Ian Rush and Michael Thomas gave the Reds a 2–0 victory and their fifth FA Cup triumph.

== Squad ==
Note: Flags indicate national team as defined under FIFA eligibility rules; some limited exceptions apply. Players may hold more than one non-FIFA nationality.

Pos.	Nation	Player
GK	ZIM	Bruce Grobbelaar
GK	ENG	Mike Hooper
GK	ENG	Robbie Holcroft
DF	ENG	Gary Ablett (to January)
DF	ENG	David Burrows
DF	ENG	Mark Wright (captain)
DF	SWE	Glenn Hysén
DF	ENG	Rob Jones (from October)
DF	SCO	Steve Nicol
DF	ENG	Barry Venison
DF	ENG	Nick Tanner
DF	ENG	Steve Hollis
MF	ENG	John Barnes
MF	ENG	Barry Jones
MF	IRL	Ronnie Whelan

Pos.	Nation	Player
MF	ENG	Mark Walters
MF	IRL	Ray Houghton
MF	SCO	Don Hutchison
MF	ENG	Michael Thomas (from December)
MF	ENG	Mike Marsh
MF	DEN	Jan Mølby
MF	ENG	Steve Harkness
MF	ENG	Steve McMahon (to December)
MF	ENG	Steve McManaman
MF	ENG	Jamie Redknapp
MF	ENG	Jimmy Carter (to October)
MF	HUN	István Kozma (from February)
FW	WAL	Ian Rush
FW	ISR	Ronnie Rosenthal
FW	WAL	Dean Saunders

== Squad statistics ==
=== Appearances and goals ===
No.	Pos	Nat	Player	Total		Division 1		FA Cup		League Cup		UEFA Cup	
No.	Pos	Nat	Player	Apps	Goals	Apps	Goals	Apps	Goals	Apps	Goals	Apps	Goals
	DF	(England) ENG	Gary Ablett	23	0	13+1	0	0+0	0	2+1	0	6+0	0
	MF	(England) ENG	John Barnes	17	4	12+0	1	4+0	3	0+0	0	1+0	0
	DF	(England) ENG	David Burrows	48	1	30+0	1	6+0	0	5+0	0	7+0	0
	MF	(England) ENG	Jimmy Carter	1	0	0+0	0	0+0	0	0+0	0	0+1	0
	GK	(Zimbabwe) ZIM	Bruce Grobbelaar	55	0	37+0	0	9+0	0	4+0	0	5+0	0
	DF	(England) ENG	Steve Harkness	19	0	7+4	0	1+0	0	2+1	0	3+1	0
	GK	(England) ENG	Mike Hooper	9	0	5+0	0	0+0	0	1+0	0	3+0	0
	MF	(Republic of Ireland) IRL	Ray Houghton	51	12	36+0	8	8+0	1	3+0	1	4+0	2
	MF	(Scotland) SCO	Don Hutchison	3	0	0+3	0	0+0	0	0+0	0	0+0	0
	DF	(Sweden) SWE	Glenn Hysén	7	1	3+2	1	0+0	0	2+0	0	0+0	0
	DF	(England) ENG	Barry Jones	1	0	0+0	0	0+0	0	0+0	0	0+1	0
	DF	(England) ENG	Rob Jones	39	0	28+0	0	9+0	0	0+0	0	2+0	0
	MF	(Hungary) HUN	István Kozma	7	0	3+2	0	0+2	0	0+0	0	0+0	0
	MF	(England) ENG	Mike Marsh	52	1	19+15	0	4+2	0	3+1	0	7+1	1
	MF	(England) ENG	Steve McMahon	24	1	15+0	1	0+0	0	4+0	0	5+0	0
	MF	(England) ENG	Steve McManaman	51	11	26+4	5	8+0	3	5+0	3	8+0	0
	MF	(Denmark) DEN	Jan Mølby	40	5	25+1	3	5+1	1	3+0	0	5+0	1
	MF	(Scotland) SCO	Steve Nicol	52	1	34+0	1	8+0	0	3+0	0	7+0	0
	MF	(England) ENG	Jamie Redknapp	10	1	5+1	1	2+0	0	0+0	0	1+1	0
	FW	(Israel) ISR	Ronny Rosenthal	27	3	7+13	3	1+2	0	0+3	0	1+0	0
	FW	(Wales) WAL	Ian Rush	31	8	16+2	3	4+1	1	3+0	3	5+0	1
	FW	(Wales) WAL	Dean Saunders	54	23	36+0	10	8+0	2	5+0	2	5+0	9
	DF	(England) ENG	Nick Tanner	45	1	32+0	1	2+0	0	5+0	0	5+1	0
	MF	(England) ENG	Michael Thomas	22	5	16+1	3	5+0	2	0+0	0	0+0	0
	DF	(England) ENG	Barry Venison	19	2	9+4	1	1+2	0	0+0	0	0+3	1
	MF	(England) ENG	Mark Walters	37	6	18+7	3	2+1	0	4+0	2	4+1	1
	MF	(Republic of Ireland) IRL	Ronnie Whelan	13	1	9+1	0	3+0	1	0+0	0	0+0	0
	DF	(England) ENG	Mark Wright	35	0	21+0	0	9+0	0	1+0	0	4+0	0

=== Top scorers ===
Competition	Result	Top Scorer
First Division	6th	(Wales) Dean Saunders, 10
FA Cup	Winners	(England) Steve McManaman, 3
League Cup	Fourth Round	(England) Steve McManaman, 3 (Wales) Ian Rush, 3
UEFA Cup	Quarter Finals	(Wales) Dean Saunders, 9
Overall		(Wales) Dean Saunders, 23

== League Table ==
Pos	Team	Pld	W	D	L	GF	GA	GD	Pts	Qualification or relegation
4	Arsenal	42	19	15	8	81	46	+35	72	Qualification for the FA Premier League
5	Manchester City	42	20	10	12	61	48	+13	70	Qualification for the FA Premier League
6	Liverpool	42	16	16	10	47	40	+7	64	Qualification for the European Cup Winners' Cup first round and qualification for the FA Premier League
7	Aston Villa	42	17	9	16	48	44	+4	60	Qualification for the FA Premier League
8	Nottingham Forest	42	16	11	15	60	58	+2	59	Qualification for the FA Premier League

Source: World Football
Rules for classification: 1) Points; 2) Goal difference; 3) Goals scored

== Matches ==
=== First Division ===
17 August 1991 1	Liverpool	2–1	Oldham Athletic	Liverpool
	Houghton 53'; Barnes 78'	Report	Barrett 6'	Stadium: Anfield; Attendance: 38,841; Referee: Keith Hackett

21 August 1991 2	Manchester City	2–1	Liverpool	Manchester
	White 28', 64'	Report	McManaman 75'	Stadium: Maine Road; Attendance: 37,322; Referee: Paul Vanes

24 August 1991 3	Luton Town	0–0	Liverpool	Luton
		Report	McMahon (red card) 51'	Stadium: Kenilworth Road; Attendance: 11,132; Referee: John Moules

27 August 1991 4	Liverpool	1–0	Queens Park Rangers	Liverpool
	Saunders 62'	Report		Stadium: Anfield; Attendance: 32,700; Referee: Stephen Lodge

31 August 1991 5	Liverpool	3–1	Everton	Liverpool
	Burrows 1'; Saunders 15'; Houghton 62'	Report	Newell 76'	Stadium: Anfield; Attendance: 39,072; Referee: Ray Lewis

7 September 1991 6	Notts County	1–2	Liverpool	Nottingham
	Johnson 43'	Report	Rosenthal 70'; Walters 88' (pen.)	Stadium: Meadow Lane; Attendance: 16,051; Referee: Alf Buksh

14 September 1991 7	Liverpool	1–1	Aston Villa	Liverpool
	Walters 39' (pen.)	Report	Richardson 25'	Stadium: Anfield; Attendance: 38,400; Referee: Mike Peck

21 September 1991 8	Leeds United	1–0	Liverpool	Leeds
	Hodge 25'	Report		Stadium: Elland Road; Attendance: 32,917; Referee: George Courtney

28 September 1991 9	Liverpool	1–1	Sheffield Wednesday	Liverpool
	Houghton 17'	Report	Harkes 67'	Stadium: Anfield; Attendance: 37,071; Referee: Paul Danson

6 October 1991 10	Manchester United	0–0	Liverpool	Manchester
		Report	Ablett (red card) 65'	Stadium: Old Trafford; Attendance: 44,997; Referee: Mike Reed

19 October 1991 11	Chelsea	2–2	Liverpool	London
	Jones 9'; Myers 51'	Report	McManaman 4'; Rush 59'	Stadium: Stamford Bridge; Attendance: 30,230; Referee: Ken Redfern

26 October 1991 12	Liverpool	1–0	Coventry City	Liverpool
	Houghton 35'	Report		Stadium: Anfield; Attendance: 33,339; Referee: Roger Milford

2 November 1991 13	Liverpool	1–2	Crystal Palace	Liverpool
	Hysén 42'	Report	Gabbiadini 50'; Thomas 71'	Stadium: Anfield; Attendance: 34,231; Referee: Terry Holbrook

17 November 1991 14	West Ham United	0–0	Liverpool	London
		Report		Stadium: Upton Park; Attendance: 23,569; Referee: Gerald Ashby

23 November 1991 15	Wimbledon	0–0	Liverpool	London
		Report		Stadium: Selhurst Park; Attendance: 13,373; Referee: Roger Pawley

30 November 1991 16	Liverpool	2–1	Norwich City	Liverpool
	Mølby 3'; Houghton 30'	Report	Beckford 35'	Stadium: Anfield; Attendance: 34,881; Referee: Brian Hill

7 December 1991 17	Southampton	1–1	Liverpool	Southampton
	Shearer 56'	Report	Redknapp 74'	Stadium: The Dell; Attendance: 19,053; Referee: Ray Lewis

15 December 1991 18	Liverpool	2–0	Nottingham Forest	Liverpool
	McMahon 16'; Mølby 80'	Report		Stadium: Anfield; Attendance: 35,285; Referee: Keith Hackett

18 December 1991 19	Tottenham Hotspur	1–2	Liverpool	London
	Walsh 23'	Report	Saunders 29'; Houghton 81'	Stadium: White Hart Lane; Attendance: 27,434; Referee: John Martin

21 December 1991 20	Liverpool	2–2	Manchester City	Liverpool
	Saunders 9'; Nicol 82'	Report	White 48', 55'	Stadium: Anfield; Attendance: 36,743; Referee: D. Phillips

26 December 1991 21	Queens Park Rangers	0–0	Liverpool	London
		Report		Stadium: Loftus Road; Attendance: 21,693; Referee: Jim Borrett

28 December 1991 22	Everton	1–1	Liverpool	Liverpool
	Johnston 62'	Report	Tanner 41'	Stadium: Goodison Park; Attendance: 37,681; Referee: Vic Callow

1 January 1992 23	Liverpool	2–1	Sheffield United	Liverpool
	Houghton 52'; Saunders 79'	Report	Deane 32'	Stadium: Anfield; Attendance: 25,993; Referee: P. Wright

11 January 1992 24	Liverpool	2–1	Luton Town	Liverpool
	McManaman 85'; Saunders 90'	Report	Tanner 31' (o.g.)	Stadium: Anfield; Attendance: 35,095; Referee: William Burns

18 January 1992 25	Oldham Athletic	2–3	Liverpool	Oldham
	Adams 4'; Bernard 86'	Report	McManaman 18'; Saunders 42'; Thomas 73'	Stadium: Boundary Park; Attendance: 18,952; Referee: Ken Redfern

29 January 1992 26	Liverpool	2–0	Arsenal	Liverpool
	Mølby 45' (pen.); Houghton 69'	Report		Stadium: Anfield; Attendance: 33,753; Referee: Mike Reed

1 February 1992 27	Liverpool	1–2	Chelsea	Liverpool
	Rosenthal 31'	Report	Jones 20'; Wise 73'	Stadium: Anfield; Attendance: 28,681; Referee: Mike Peck

8 February 1992 28	Coventry City	0–0	Liverpool	Coventry
		Report		Stadium: Highfield Road; Attendance: 21,540; Referee: Robbie Hart

22 February 1992 29	Norwich City	3–0	Liverpool	Norwich
	Woodthorpe 67'; Fleck 70', 90'	Report		Stadium: Carrow Road; Attendance: 20,411; Referee: M. Bailey

29 February 1992 30	Liverpool	0–0	Southampton	Liverpool
		Report		Stadium: Anfield; Attendance: 34,449; Referee: Stephen Lodge

11 March 1992 31	Liverpool	1–0	West Ham United	Liverpool
	Saunders 3'	Report		Stadium: Anfield; Attendance: 30,821; Referee: Jim Rushton

14 March 1992 32	Crystal Palace	1–0	Liverpool	London
	Young 40'	Report		Stadium: Selhurst Park; Attendance: 23,680; Referee: George Courtney

21 March 1992 33	Liverpool	2–1	Tottenham Hotspur	Liverpool
	Saunders 48', 81'	Report	Stewart 74'	Stadium: Anfield; Attendance: 36,968; Referee: Roger Milford

28 March 1992 34	Sheffield United	2–0	Liverpool	Sheffield
	Deane 43', 70'	Report		Stadium: Bramall Lane; Attendance: 26,943; Referee: Alan Wilkie

31 March 1992 35	Liverpool	4–0	Notts County	Liverpool
	Thomas 13'; McManaman 34'; Rush 58'; Venison 76'	Report		Stadium: Anfield; Attendance: 25,457; Referee: D. Phillips

8 April 1992 36	Liverpool	2–3	Wimbledon	Liverpool
	Thomas 7'; Rosenthal 45'	Report	Sanchez 35'; Clarke 66'; Fashanu 75' (pen.)	Stadium: Anfield; Attendance: 26,134

11 April 1992 37	Aston Villa	1–0	Liverpool	Birmingham
	Daley 65'	Report		Stadium: Villa Park; Attendance: 35,755; Referee: Roger Pawley

18 April 1992 38	Liverpool	0–0	Leeds United	Liverpool
		Report		Stadium: Anfield; Attendance: 37,186; Referee: Ken Redfern

20 April 1992 39	Arsenal	4–0	Liverpool	London
	Hillier 6'; Wright 16', 47'; Limpar 40'	Report		Stadium: Highbury; Attendance: 38,157; Referee: Keith Hackett

22 April 1992 40	Nottingham Forest	1–1	Liverpool	Nottingham
	Sheringham 29'	Report	Rush 40'	Stadium: City Ground; Attendance: 23,787; Referee: Allan Flood

26 April 1992 41	Liverpool	2–0	Manchester United	Liverpool
	Rush 12'; Walters 87'	Report		Stadium: Anfield; Attendance: 38,669; Referee: Roger Gifford

2 May 1992 42	Sheffield Wednesday	0–0	Liverpool	Sheffield
		Report		Stadium: Hillsborough; Attendance: 34,861

=== FA Cup ===
5 January 1992 3rd Round	Crewe Alexandra	0–4	Liverpool	Crewe
20:00		Report	McManaman 10'; Barnes 26', 28', 89' (pen.)	Stadium: Gresty Road; Attendance: 7,457; Referee: Terry Holbrook

8 February 1992 4th Round	Bristol Rovers	1–1	Liverpool	Bristol
19:45	C. Saunders 60'	Report	D. Saunders 38'	Stadium: Twerton Park; Attendance: 9,464; Referee: Brian Hill

11 February 1992 4th Round Replay	Liverpool	2–1	Bristol Rovers	Liverpool
19:30	McManaman 50'; D. Saunders 77'	Report	C. Saunders 18'	Stadium: Anfield; Attendance: 30,142; Referee: Brian Hill

16 February 1992 5th Round	Ipswich Town	0–0	Liverpool	Ipswich
13:00		Report		Stadium: Portman Road; Attendance: 26,140

26 February 1992 5th Round Replay	Liverpool	3–2	Ipswich Town	Liverpool
19:30	Houghton 45'; Mølby 98'; McManaman 100'	Report	Johnson 89'; Dozzell 96'	Stadium: Anfield; Attendance: 27,355

8 March 1992 6th Round	Liverpool	1–0	Aston Villa	Liverpool
15:05	Thomas 47'	Report		Stadium: Anfield; Attendance: 29,109; Referee: Philip Don

5 April 1992 Semi-Final	Liverpool	1–1 (a.e.t.)	Portsmouth	London
13:00	Whelan 116'	Report	Anderton 111'	Stadium: Highbury; Attendance: 41,869; Referee: Martin Bodenham

13 April 1992 Semi-Final Replay	Portsmouth	0–0 (a.e.t.) (1–3 p)	Liverpool	Birmingham
19:45		Report		Stadium: Villa Park; Attendance: 40,077; Referee: Martin Bodenham
	Penalties
	Kuhl (penalty missed); Symons (penalty scored); Neill (penalty missed); Beresford (penalty missed)		(penalty scored) Barnes; (penalty scored) Rush; (penalty scored) Saunders

9 May 1992 Final	Liverpool	2–0	Sunderland	London
15:00	Thomas 47'; Rush 68'	Report		Stadium: Wembley Stadium; Attendance: 79,544; Referee: Philip Don

=== Football League Cup ===
25 September 2nd Round 1st Leg	Liverpool	2 – 2	Stoke City	Liverpool
	Rush 16', 71'	Report	Cranson 37'; Tony Kelly 87'	Stadium: Anfield; Attendance: 18,389

9 October 2nd Round 2nd Leg	Stoke City	2 – 3 (4–5 agg.)	Liverpool	Stoke on Trent
	Biggins 77' (pen.), 85'	Report	McManaman 9'; Saunders 56'; Walters 84'	Stadium: Victoria Ground; Attendance: 22,335

29 October 3rd Round	Liverpool	2 – 2	Port Vale	Liverpool
	McManaman 8'; Rush 65'	Report	van der Laan 5'; Foyle 75'	Stadium: Anfield; Attendance: 21,553

20 November 3rd Round Replay	Port Vale	1 – 4	Liverpool	Stoke on Trent
	Foyle 23'	Report	McManaman 21'; Walters 29'; Houghton 43'; Saunders 62'	Stadium: Vale Park; Attendance: 18,725

3 December 4th Round	Peterborough United	1 – 0	Liverpool	Peterborough
	Kimble 19'	Report		Stadium: London Road Stadium; Attendance: 14,114

=== UEFA Cup ===
18 September 1991 First round first leg	Liverpool (England)	6–1	(Finland) Kuusysi Lahti	Liverpool
	Saunders 12', 77', 85', 86'; Houghton 33', 90'	Report	Lehtinen 35'	Stadium: Anfield; Attendance: 17,131; Referee: Manfred Schlup (Switzerland)

2 October 1991 First round second leg	Kuusysi Lahti (Finland)	1–0 (2–6 agg.)	(England) Liverpool	Lahti
	Belfield 66'	Report		Stadium: Lahden Stadion; Attendance: 8,000

23 October 1991 Second round first leg	Auxerre (France)	2–0	(England) Liverpool	Auxerre
	Ferreri 42'; Kovács 60'	Report		Stadium: Stade de l'Abbé-Deschamps; Attendance: 20,000

6 November 1991 Second round second leg	Liverpool (England)	3–0 (3–2 agg.)	(France) Auxerre	Liverpool
	Mølby 4' (pen.); Marsh 30'; Walters 83'	Report		Stadium: Anfield; Attendance: 23,094

27 November 1991 Third round first leg	FC Swarovski Tirol (Austria)	0–2	(England) Liverpool	Innsbruck
		Report	Saunders 58', 79'	Stadium: Tivoli; Attendance: 13,500

11 December 1991 Third round second leg	Liverpool (England)	4–0 (6–0 agg.)	(Austria) FC Swarovski Tirol	Liverpool
	Saunders 40', 57', 68'; Venison 80'	Report		Stadium: Anfield; Attendance: 16,007

4 March 1992 Quarter-final first leg	Genoa (Italy)	2–0	(England) Liverpool	Genoa
	Fiorin 39'; Branco 88'	Report		Stadium: Stadio Luigi Ferraris; Attendance: 40,500

18 March 1992 Quarter-final second leg	Liverpool (England)	1–2 (1–4 agg.)	(Italy) Genoa	Liverpool
	Rush 49'	Report	Aguilera 27', 72'	Stadium: Anfield; Attendance: 38,840
