= 1992–93 Liverpool F.C. season =

English football club season

Liverpool
1992–93 season
- Chairman: David Moores
- Manager: Graeme Souness
- Premier League: 6th
- FA Cup: Third round
- League Cup: Fourth round
- Charity Shield: Runners-up
- UEFA Cup Winners' Cup: Second round
- Top goalscorer: League: Ian Rush (14); All: Ian Rush (22)
- Highest home attendance: 44,619 (vs. Everton, League, 20 March)
- Lowest home attendance: 12,533 (vs. Chesterfield, League Cup, 22 September)
- Average home league attendance: 34,741
Home colours	Away colours

The 1992–93 season was the 101st season in Liverpool F.C.'s existence, and their 31st consecutive year in the top-flight. Having won the FA Cup the previous season, Liverpool had qualified for the UEFA Cup Winners' Cup.

New members of the side for the 1992–93 season included goalkeeper David James, Danish defender Torben Piechnik and attacking midfielder Paul Stewart. The close season had seen the departure of defender Barry Venison and winger Ray Houghton. A few weeks into the season, striker Dean Saunders also headed out of Anfield to sign for Aston Villa.

As founder-members of the new Premier League, Liverpool finished sixth – a repeat of their performance in the previous season. But their failure to make an impact in the cup competitions meant that their season ended without a trophy and left them without any European football for the 1993–94 season.

This season covered the period from 1 July 1992 to 30 June 1993.

== Players ==
=== First-team squad ===
Note: Flags indicate national team as defined under FIFA eligibility rules; some limited exceptions apply. Players may hold more than one non-FIFA nationality.

Pos.	Nation	Player
GK	ZIM	Bruce Grobbelaar (Note: Grobbelaar was born in Durban, South Africa, but was raised in Rhodesia (later named Zimbabwe) from the age of two months and made his international debut for Rhodesia in 1977 and for Zimbabwe in 1980.)
GK	ENG	Mike Hooper
GK	ENG	David James
DF	NOR	Stig Inge Bjørnebye
DF	ENG	David Burrows
DF	ENG	Steve Harkness
DF	ENG	Rob Jones
DF	SCO	Steve Nicol
DF	DEN	Torben Piechnik
DF	ENG	Nick Tanner
DF	ENG	Mark Wright (captain)
MF	ENG	John Barnes
MF	ENG	Phil Charnock

Pos.	Nation	Player
MF	SCO	Don Hutchison (Note: Hutchison was born in Gateshead, England, but also qualified to represent Scotland internationally through his father and would make his international debut for Scotland in March 1999, having previously represented them at B level.)
MF	HUN	István Kozma
MF	ENG	Mike Marsh
MF	ENG	Steve McManaman
MF	DEN	Jan Mølby
MF	ENG	Jamie Redknapp
MF	ENG	Michael Thomas
MF	ENG	Mark Walters
MF	IRL	Ronnie Whelan
FW	ENG	Robbie Fowler
FW	ISR	Ronny Rosenthal
FW	WAL	Ian Rush
FW	ENG	Paul Stewart

=== Left club during season ===
Note: Flags indicate national team as defined under FIFA eligibility rules; some limited exceptions apply. Players may hold more than one non-FIFA nationality.

Pos. / Nation / Player; FW / IRL / Tony Cousins (to Middlesbrough)	Pos. / Nation / Player; FW / WAL / Dean Saunders (to Aston Villa)

=== Reserve squad ===
Note: Flags indicate national team as defined under FIFA eligibility rules; some limited exceptions apply. Players may hold more than one non-FIFA nationality.

Pos.	Nation	Player
FW	ENG	Robbie Fowler

== Squad statistics ==
=== Appearances and goals ===
No.	Pos	Nat	Player	Total		Premier League		FA Cup		Charity Shield		League Cup		European CWC	
No.	Pos	Nat	Player	Apps	Goals	Apps	Goals	Apps	Goals	Apps	Goals	Apps	Goals	Apps	Goals
	MF	(England) ENG	John Barnes	31	5	26+1	5	2+0	0	0+0	0	2+0	0	0+0	0
	DF	(Norway) NOR	Stig Inge Bjørnebye	13	0	11+0	0	2+0	0	0+0	0	0+0	0	0+0	0
	DF	(England) ENG	David Burrows	40	2	29+1	2	0+0	0	1+0	0	5+0	0	4+0	0
	MF	(England) ENG	Phil Charnock	2	0	0+0	0	0+0	0	0+0	0	1+0	0	0+1	0
	GK	(Zimbabwe) ZIM	Bruce Grobbelaar	10	0	5+0	0	0+0	0	1+0	0	2+0	0	2+0	0
	DF	(England) ENG	Steve Harkness	12	0	9+1	0	0+0	0	0+0	0	0+0	0	1+1	0
	GK	(England) ENG	Mike Hooper	15	0	8+1	0	2+0	0	0+0	0	3+0	0	1+0	0
	MF	(Scotland) SCO	Don Hutchison	42	10	27+4	7	1+1	0	0+1	0	5+0	2	3+0	1
	GK	(England) ENG	David James	31	0	29+0	0	0+0	0	0+0	0	1+0	0	1+0	0
	DF	(England) ENG	Rob Jones	37	0	30+0	0	2+0	0	0+0	0	2+1	0	2+0	0
	MF	(Hungary) HUN	István Kozma	3	0	0+1	0	0+0	0	0+1	0	0+1	0	0+0	0
	MF	(England) ENG	Mike Marsh	41	4	22+6	1	2+0	0	1+0	0	6+0	3	4+0	0
	MF	(England) ENG	Steve McManaman	40	7	27+4	4	1+0	0	0+0	0	5+0	2	3+0	1
	MF	(Denmark) DEN	Jan Mølby	13	3	8+2	3	0+0	0	0+0	0	1+0	0	2+0	0
	MF	(Scotland) SCO	Steve Nicol	39	0	32+0	0	1+0	0	0+0	0	4+0	0	2+0	0
	DF	(Denmark) DEN	Torben Piechnik	23	0	15+1	0	2+0	0	0+0	0	5+0	0	0+0	0
	MF	(England) ENG	Jamie Redknapp	40	3	27+2	2	1+0	0	0+0	0	6+0	1	4+0	0
	FW	(Israel) ISR	Ronny Rosenthal	36	7	16+11	6	1+1	0	1+0	0	2+1	1	0+3	0
	FW	(Wales) WAL	Ian Rush	42	22	31+1	14	1+0	1	1+0	1	4+0	1	4+0	5
	FW	(Wales) WAL	Dean Saunders	7	2	6+0	1	0+0	0	1+0	1	0+0	0	0+0	0
	FW	(England) ENG	Paul Stewart	31	3	21+3	1	1+0	0	1+0	0	3+0	0	2+0	2
	DF	(England) ENG	Nick Tanner	10	0	2+2	0	0+0	0	1+0	0	1+2	0	1+1	0
	MF	(England) ENG	Michael Thomas	13	1	6+2	1	2+0	0	0+0	0	1+0	0	2+0	0
	MF	(England) ENG	Mark Walters	44	13	26+8	11	1+0	0	1+0	0	5+0	2	3+0	0
	MF	(Republic of Ireland) IRL	Ronnie Whelan	18	1	17+0	1	0+0	0	1+0	0	0+0	0	0+0	0
	DF	(England) ENG	Mark Wright	41	4	32+1	2	0+0	0	1+0	0	2+2	1	3+0	1

=== Goalscorers ===
Rank	Pos	Nat	Name	Premier League	FA Cup	League Cup	Charity Shield	European Cup Winner's Cup	Total
1	FW	(Wales)	Ian Rush	14	1	1	1	5	22
2	MF	(England)	Mark Walters	11	0	2	0	0	13
3	MF	(Scotland)	Don Hutchison	7	0	2	0	1	10
4	MF	(England)	Steve McManaman	4	0	2	0	1	7
4	FW	(Israel)	Ronnie Rosenthal	6	0	1	0	0	7
6	MF	(England)	John Barnes	5	0	0	0	0	5
7	MF	(England)	Mike Marsh	1	0	3	0	0	4
7	DF	(England)	Mark Wright	2	0	1	0	1	4
9	MF	(Denmark)	Jan Mølby	3	0	0	0	0	3
9	MF	(England)	Jamie Redknapp	2	0	1	0	0	3
9	FW	(England)	Paul Stewart	1	0	0	0	2	3
12	DF	(England)	David Burrows	2	0	0	0	0	2
12	FW	(Wales)	Dean Saunders	1	0	0	1	0	2
14	MF	(England)	Michael Thomas	1	0	0	0	0	1
14	MF	(Republic of Ireland)	Ronnie Whelan	1	0	0	0	0	1
Own goal				1	1	0	1	0	3
Totals				62	2	13	3	10	90

=== Top scorers ===
Competition	Result	Top scorer
Premier League	6th	(Wales) Ian Rush, 14
UEFA CWC	Second round	(Wales) Ian Rush, 5
FA Cup	Third round	(Wales) Ian Rush, 1
League Cup	Fourth round	(England) Mike Marsh, 3
Charity Shield	Runners-up	(Wales) Ian Rush, 1 (Wales) Dean Saunders, 1
Overall		(Wales) Ian Rush, 22

== Transfers ==
=== In ===
Pos	Player	From	Fee	Date
GK	(England) David James	(England) Watford	£1,000,000	6 July 1992
FW	(England) Paul Stewart	(England) Tottenham Hotspur	£2,300,000	29 July 1992
DF	(Denmark) Torben Piechnik	(Denmark) FCK	£500,000	1 August 1992
DF	(Norway) Stig Inge Bjørnebye	(Norway) Rosenborg	£600,000	18 December 1992

=== Out ===
Pos	Player	To	Fee	Date
DF	(England) Barry Jones	(Wales) Wrexham	Free	10 July 1992
MF	(Republic of Ireland) Ray Houghton	(England) Aston Villa	£825,000	28 July 1992
DF	(England) Barry Venison	(England) Newcastle United	£250,000	31 July 1992
FW	(Wales) Dean Saunders	(England) Aston Villa	£2,300,000	10 September 1992
FW	(Republic of Ireland) Tony Cousins	(England) Middlesbrough	Free	April 1993

== Pre-season and friendlies ==
Win Draw Loss

=== Paris St Germain Tournament ===
26 July 1992 R1	AS Monaco	2–1	Liverpool	Paris
20:30	Gnako 49'; Barros 61'	Report	Saunders 70' (pen.); Burrows (yellow card)	Stadium: Parc des Princes; Attendance: 18,000

27 July 1992 Third place play-off	Borussia Dortmund	3–2	Liverpool	Paris
20:30	Poschner 24'; Rummenigge 30'; Chapuisat 65'	Report	Wright 62'; Hutchison 89'	Stadium: Parc des Princes; Attendance: 15,000

=== Testimonials ===
11 August 1992 Jim Beglin	Leeds United	1–4	Liverpool	Leeds
	Batty	Report	Redknapp; Rush 12', 31'; Saunders 80'	Stadium: Elland Road; Attendance: 8,492; Referee: Steve Lodge

11 October 1992 Bruce Grobbelaar	Liverpool	2–2	Everton	Liverpool
	Burrows 23'; Rosenthal 44'	Report	Beagrie 12'; Barlow 71'	Stadium: Anfield; Attendance: 20,516; Referee: J.B. Worrall

11 May 1993 Joey Jones	Wrexham	2–2	Liverpool	Wrexham
	Hughes 33'; Case 40'	Report	Hutchison 47'; Rush 65'	Stadium: Racecourse Ground; Attendance: 11,900

=== Friendlies ===
29 July 1992	Rosenborg	1–0	Liverpool	Oslo
20:30	Stewart 72' (o.g.)	Report	Stewart (yellow card) 66'	Stadium: Ullevaal Stadion; Attendance: 21,724; Referee: R.H. Olsen

31 July 1992	Tromsø	1–2	Liverpool	Tromsø
20:30	Wright 68' (o.g.)	Report	Rush 41'; Stewart 59'; Nicol (yellow card); Wright (yellow card)	Stadium: Alfheim Stadion; Attendance: 2,049; Referee: G. Paulsen

4 August 1992	Tranmere Rovers	1–7	Liverpool	Birkenhead
19:30	Aldridge 61'	Report	Saunders 9' (pen.), 40'; Rush 11', 62'; Stewart 43'; Marsh 83'; Rosenthal 87'	Stadium: Prenton Park; Attendance: 8,717; Referee: P. Roberts

1 March 1993	Shelbourne	1–2	Liverpool	Dublin
	Henderson 13'	Report	Redknapp 12'; Walters 46'	Stadium: Tolka Park; Attendance: 9,500; Referee: T. Traynor

17 March 1993	Liverpool	1–2	Rosenborg	Liverpool
19:30	Rush 25'	Report	Goal	Stadium: Anfield; Attendance: 0

== Competitions ==
=== Premier League ===
==== League Table ====
Pos	Team	Pld	W	D	L	GF	GA	GD	Pts
4	Blackburn Rovers	42	20	11	11	68	46	+22	71
5	Queens Park Rangers	42	17	12	13	63	55	+8	63
6	Liverpool	42	16	11	15	62	55	+7	59
7	Sheffield Wednesday	42	15	14	13	55	51	+4	59
8	Tottenham Hotspur	42	16	11	15	60	66	−6	59

Source: Premier League
Rules for classification: 1) points; 2) goal difference; 3) number of goals scored.

==== Matches ====
Win Draw Loss

16 August 1992 1	Nottingham Forest	1–0	Liverpool	Nottingham
16:00	Keane (yellow card) 22'; Sheringham 29'	Report	Rush (yellow card) 12'; Burrows (yellow card) 60'	Stadium: City Ground; Attendance: 20,038; Referee: M Reed

19 August 1992 2	Liverpool	2–1	Sheffield United	Liverpool
19:30	Walters 43'; Stewart 64'	Report	Deane 35'	Stadium: Anfield; Attendance: 33,107; Referee: David Elleray

23 August 1992 3	Liverpool	0–2	Arsenal	Liverpool
16:00	Whelan (yellow card) 57'	Report	Dixon (yellow card) 24'; Jensen (yellow card) 30'; Limpar 53'; Parlour (yellow card) 56'; Wright 80'; Adams (yellow card) 85'	Stadium: Anfield; Attendance: 34,961; Referee: Ken Redfern

25 August 1992 4	Ipswich Town	2–2	Liverpool	Ipswich
	Dozzell 36'; Kiwomya 90'; Milton (yellow card) 90'	Report	Walters 39'; Wright (yellow card) 42'; Mølby 70' (pen.); James (yellow card) 80'	Stadium: Portman Road; Attendance: 20,109; Referee: Bob Hamer

29 August 1992 5	Leeds United	2–2	Liverpool	Leeds
	McAllister 7'; Cantona (yellow card) 36'; Chapman 87'	Report	Whelan 44'; Mølby 70' (pen.)	Stadium: Elland Road; Attendance: 29,597; Referee: Roger Dilkes

1 September 1992 6	Liverpool	1–1	Southampton	Liverpool
	Wright 60'	Report	K. Dixon 51'	Stadium: Anfield; Attendance: 30,024; Referee: Robbie Hart

5 September 1992 7	Liverpool	2–1	Chelsea	Liverpool
	Saunders 26'; Redknapp 89'	Report	Harford 72'; Wise (yellow card) 81'; Pearce (yellow card) 85'; Beasant (yellow card) 88'	Stadium: Anfield; Attendance: 29,597; Referee: John Key

12 September 1992 8	Sheffield United	1–0	Liverpool	Sheffield
	Littlejohn 4'; Dean (yellow card) 35'; Gage (yellow card) 77'	Report	Walters (yellow card) 40'; Burrows (yellow card) 87'; Rush (yellow card) 87'	Stadium: Bramall Lane; Attendance: 20,632; Referee: John E Martin

19 September 1992 9	Aston Villa	4–2	Liverpool	Birmingham
15:00	Saunders 44', 66'; Atkinson 54' (yellow card) 64'; Houghton (yellow card) 77'; Parker 78'	Report	Walters 43'; Piechnik (yellow card) 62'; Rosenthal 84'	Stadium: Villa Park; Attendance: 37,863; Referee: Philip Don

26 September 1992 10	Liverpool	2–3	Wimbledon	Liverpool
	Wright (yellow card) 9'; Mølby 35' (pen.); McManaman 39'	Report	Fashanu 12'; Clarke (yellow card) 20'; Earle 27', 76'; Scales (yellow card) 67'; Sanchez (yellow card) 67'	Stadium: Anfield; Attendance: 29,574; Referee: Roger Milford

3 October 1992 11	Liverpool	1–0	Sheffield Wednesday	Liverpool
	Stewart (yellow card) 15'; Hutchison 80'	Report	Warhurst (yellow card) 40'; Palmer (yellow card) 47'	Stadium: Anfield; Attendance: 35,785; Referee: Martin Bodenham

18 October 1992 12	Manchester United	2–2	Liverpool	Manchester
	Hughes 78', 90'	Report	Hutchison 23'; Rush (yellow card) 32' (goal) 44'	Stadium: Old Trafford; Attendance: 33,243; Referee: Keith Hackett

25 October 1992 13	Liverpool	4–1	Norwich City	Liverpool
	Thomas 15'; Hutchison 20'; Burrows 52'; Nicol (yellow card) 69'; Walters 89' (pen.)	Report	Butterworth 2' (yellow card) 52'; Goss (yellow card) 7'; Newman (yellow card) 28'; Sutton (yellow card) 78'	Stadium: Anfield; Attendance: 36,318; Referee: Ray Lewis

31 October 1992 14	Tottenham Hotspur	2–0	Liverpool	London
15:00	Nayim 63'; Austin (yellow card) 68'; Ruddock 72'	Report	Piechnik (yellow card) 11'; Walters (yellow card) 14'; Hutchison (yellow card) 35'	Stadium: White Hart Lane; Attendance: 36,318; Referee: Gerald Ashby

7 November 1992 15	Liverpool	4–1	Middlesbrough	Liverpool
15:00	Rosenthal 9', 38'; McManaman 45'; Rush 89'	Report	Phillips 41' (pen.)	Stadium: Anfield; Attendance: 34,974; Referee: Dermot Gallagher

23 November 1992 16	Queens Park Rangers	0–1	Liverpool	London
		Report	Redknapp (yellow card) 19'; Rosenthal 87'	Stadium: Loftus Road; Attendance: 21,056; Referee: Roger Milford

28 November 1992 17	Liverpool	5–0	Crystal Palace	Liverpool
	McManaman 7', 19'; Marsh 9'; Rosenthal 61'; Hutchison 76'	Report	Young (yellow card) 40'; McGoldrick (yellow card) 67'	Stadium: Anfield; Attendance: 36,380; Referee: Steve Lodge

7 December 1992 18	Everton	2–1	Liverpool	Liverpool
19:45	Johnston 63'; Beardsley 84'	Report	Wright 62'	Stadium: Goodison Park; Attendance: 35,826; Referee: Martin Bodenham

13 December 1992 19	Liverpool	2–1	Blackburn Rovers	Liverpool
16:00	Walters 77', 85'	Report	Shearer 80'	Stadium: Anfield; Attendance: 43,668; Referee: Philip Don

19 December 1992 20	Coventry City	5–1	Liverpool	Coventry
	Borrows 37' (pen.), 54'; Gallacher 61'; Quinn 71', 74'	Report	Hutchison (yellow card) 61'; Redknapp 64' (yellow card) 42' (yellow-red card) 70'	Stadium: Highfield Road; Attendance: 19,779; Referee: Kelvin Morton

28 December 1992 21	Liverpool	1–1	Manchester City	Liverpool
15:00	Rush 49'	Report	Quinn 39'; McMahon (yellow card) 61'	Stadium: Anfield; Attendance: 43,037; Referee: David Allison

9 January 1993 22	Liverpool	1–2	Aston Villa	Liverpool
	Barnes 42'	Report	Teale (yellow card) 52'; Parker 54'; Saunders 64'	Stadium: Anfield; Attendance: 40,826; Referee: Keith Hackett

16 January 1993 23	Wimbledon	2–0	Liverpool	London
	Fashanu 36' (pen.); Cotterill 64'	Report		Stadium: Selhurst Park; Attendance: 11,294; Referee: Roger Dilkes

31 January 1993 24	Arsenal	0–1	Liverpool	London
16:00	Winterburn (yellow card) 27' (yellow-red card) 87'	Report	Stewart (yellow card) 13'; Barnes 59' (pen.)	Stadium: Highbury; Attendance: 27,580; Referee: Keith A Cooper

6 February 1993 25	Liverpool	0–0	Nottingham Forest	Liverpool
15:00		Report	Keane (yellow card) 62'	Stadium: Anfield; Attendance: 40,463; Referee: Keren Barratt

10 February 1993 26	Chelsea	0–0	Liverpool	London
19:45	Hall (yellow card) 89'	Report	Marsh (yellow card) 27'	Stadium: Stamford Bridge; Attendance: 20,981; Referee: John E Martin

13 February 1993 27	Southampton	2–1	Liverpool	Southampton
17:00	Maddison 23'; Banger 73'; Monkou (yellow card) 83'; Adams (yellow card) 89'	Report	Hutchison 61'	Stadium: The Dell; Attendance: 17,216; Referee: Alf Buksh

20 February 1993 28	Liverpool	0–0	Ipswich Town	Liverpool
		Report		Stadium: Anfield; Attendance: 36,680; Referee: Alan Gunn

27 February 1993 29	Sheffield Wednesday	1–1	Liverpool	Sheffield
	Worthington (yellow card) 45' (red card) 65'; Anderson 82'	Report	Hutchison 20'	Stadium: Hillsborough; Attendance: 33,964; Referee: Vic Callow

6 March 1993 30	Liverpool	1–2	Manchester United	Liverpool
15:00	Rush 50'	Report	Hughes 42'; McClair 56'	Stadium: Anfield; Attendance: 44,374; Referee: Roger Milford

10 March 1993 31	Liverpool	1–0	Queens Park Rangers	Liverpool
	Rush 72'	Report	Peacock (yellow card) 52'; Ferdinand (yellow card) 78'	Stadium: Anfield; Attendance: 30,370; Referee: Keith Burge

13 March 1993 32	Middlesbrough	1–2	Liverpool	Middlesbrough
	Nicol 15' (o.g.); Peake (yellow card) 50'; Mohan (yellow card) 55'; Phillips (yellow card) 84'	Report	Hutchison 11' (yellow card) 37'; Walters (yellow card) 52'; Rush 81'	Stadium: Ayresome Park; Attendance: 22,463; Referee: Mike Peck

20 March 1993 33	Liverpool	1–0	Everton	Liverpool
	Rosenthal 90'	Report	Snodin (yellow card) 49'	Stadium: Anfield; Attendance: 44,619; Referee: Philip Don

23 March 1993 34	Crystal Palace	1–1	Liverpool	London
	Armstrong 78'	Report	Burrows (yellow card) 23'; Rush 49'; Hutchison (yellow card) 80'	Stadium: Selhurst Park; Attendance: 18,688; Referee: Roger Dilkes

3 April 1993 35	Blackburn Rovers	4–1	Liverpool	Blackburn
	Newell 13'; Hendry (yellow card) 19'; Moran 25'; Gallacher 41'; Wilcox 65'	Report	Rush 84'	Stadium: Ewood Park; Attendance: 15,032; Referee: Ken Redfern

10 April 1993 36	Liverpool	1–0	Oldham Athletic	Liverpool
	Rush 60'	Report		Stadium: Anfield; Attendance: 36,129; Referee: Joe Worrall

12 April 1993 37	Manchester City	1–1	Liverpool	Manchester
	Flitcroft 12'	Report	Rush 61'	Stadium: Maine Road; Attendance: 28,098; Referee: Mike Reed

17 April 1993 38	Liverpool	4–0	Coventry City	Liverpool
	Walters 16', 33', 50' (pen.); Burrows 75'	Report		Stadium: Anfield; Attendance: 33,328; Referee: Tony Ward

21 April 1993 39	Liverpool	2–0	Leeds United	Liverpool
	Barnes 54'; Walters 73' (pen.)	Report		Stadium: Anfield; Attendance: 34,992; Referee: Mike Reed

1 May 1993 40	Norwich City	1–0	Liverpool	Norwich
	Newman (yellow card) 55'; Phillips 62' (pen.); Goss (yellow card) 63'	Report	James (yellow card) 30' (yellow-red card) 61'; Wright (yellow card) 42'; Stewart (yellow card) 55'; Rush (yellow card) 61'	Stadium: Carrow Road; Attendance: 20,610; Referee: David Elleray

5 May 1993 41	Oldham Athletic	3–2	Liverpool	Oldham
	Beckford 20'; Olney 35', 36'; Henry (yellow card) 76'	Report	Redknapp (yellow card) 24'; Burrows (yellow card) 26' Rush 30', 59'; Hutchison (red card) 75'; Walters (yellow card) 88'	Stadium: Boundary Park; Attendance: 15,381; Referee: Paul Durkin

8 May 1993 42	Liverpool	6–2	Tottenham Hotspur	Liverpool
	Rush 21', 85'; Barnes 44', 88'; Nethercott 47' (own goal.); Walters 82' (pen.); Jones (yellow card) 89'	Report	Van Den Hauwe (yellow card) 44'; Sheringham 46'; Sedgley 77'	Stadium: Anfield; Attendance: 43,385; Referee: Steve Lodge

=== FA Cup ===
3 January 1993 3rd Round	Bolton Wanderers	2–2	Liverpool	Bolton
	McGinlay 6'; Seagraves 22'	Report	Winstanley 56' (o.g.); Rush 82'	Stadium: Burnden Park; Attendance: 21,502; Referee: Ron Groves

13 January 1993 3rd Round Replay	Liverpool	0–2	Bolton Wanderers	Liverpool
		Report	McGinlay 3'; Walker 78'	Stadium: Anfield; Attendance: 34,790; Referee: Ron Groves

=== Football League Cup ===
22 September 1992 2nd Round 1st Leg	Liverpool	4–4	Chesterfield	Liverpool
	Rosenthal 51'; Hutchison 58'; Walters 72'; Wright 85'	Report	Norris 7', 69'; Lancaster 30', 48'	Stadium: Anfield; Attendance: 12,533; Referee: Philip Wright

6 October 1992 2nd Round 2nd Leg	Chesterfield	1–4 (5–8 agg.)	Liverpool	Chesterfield
	Hebberd 10'	Report	Hutchison 19'; Redknapp 35'; Walters 42'; Rush 56'	Stadium: Saltergate; Attendance: 10,632; Referee: Gerald Ashby

28 October 1992 3rd Round	Sheffield United	0–0	Liverpool	Sheffield
		Report		Stadium: Bramall Lane; Attendance: 17,856; Referee: Tony Ward

11 November 1992 3rd Round Replay	Liverpool	3–0	Sheffield United	Liverpool
	McManaman 33', 42'; Marsh 84' (pen.)	Report		Stadium: Anfield; Attendance: 17,654; Referee: Kelvin Morton

1 December 1992 4th Round	Liverpool	1–1	Crystal Palace	Liverpool
	Marsh 77' (pen.)	Report	Coleman 56'	Stadium: Anfield; Attendance: 18,525; Referee: Brian Hill

16 December 1992 4th Round Replay	Crystal Palace	2–1 (a.e.t.)	Liverpool	London
	Watts 14'; Thorn 101'	Report	Marsh 26' (pen.)	Stadium: Selhurst Park; Attendance: 19,622; Referee: Peter Foakes

=== FA Charity Shield ===
8 August 1992	Liverpool	3–4	Leeds United	London
15:00	Rush 34'; Saunders 65'; Strachan 89' (o.g.)	Report	Cantona 26', 77', 87'; Dorigo 43'	Stadium: Wembley Stadium; Attendance: 61,291; Referee: David Elleray

=== European Cup Winners' Cup ===
16 September 1992 First Round, First Leg	Liverpool (England)	6–1	(Cyprus) Apollon Limassol	Liverpool
19:35	Stewart 4', 38'; Rush 39', 50', 55', 74'	Report	Špoljarić 84'	Stadium: Anfield; Attendance: 12,769; Referee: J A Veiga Trigo (Portugal)

29 September 1992 First Round, Second Leg	Apollon Limassol (Cyprus)	1–2	(England) Liverpool	Limassol
19:00	Špoljarić 60'	Report	Rush 62'; Hutchison 68'; Stewart (red card) 72'	Stadium: Tsirion Stadium; Attendance: 10,000; Referee: L Stafoggia (Italy)

22 October 1992 Second Round, First Leg	Spartak Moscow (Russia)	4–2	(England) Liverpool	Moscow
19:00	Pisarev 10'; Karpin 69', 84' (pen.); Lediakhov 89'	Report	Wright 65'; McManaman 79'; Grobbelaar (red card) 84'	Stadium: Central Lenin Stadium; Attendance: 55,000; Referee: R Larsson (Sweden)

4 November 1992 Second Round, Second Leg	Liverpool (England)	0–2	(Russia) Spartak Moscow	Liverpool
19:35	Marsh (red card) 87'	Report	Radchenko 63'; Piatnitski 89'	Stadium: Anfield; Attendance: 37,993; Referee: M Diaz Vega (Spain)

== Season events ==
=== August ===
In the last season of the original Football League First Division before the creation of the Premier League, Liverpool had collected their fifth FA Cup but finished sixth in the league – the first time since 1981 that they hadn't finished champions or runners-up. They had returned to European competition in the UEFA Cup and reached the quarter-finals. Their disappointment in the league could largely be put down to the fact that key players Ian Rush and John Barnes had missed many games through injury. However, Rush and Barnes were back to full fitness for the 1992–93 season, accompanied by new signing Paul Stewart from Tottenham Hotspur, who could double as a midfielder or attacker, and 21-year-old Watford goalkeeper David James who was already an England under-21 international and widely tipped to be a full international over the next few years.

The season began on 8 August, when Liverpool faced league champions Leeds United in the FA Charity Shield, and an action packed game at Wembley Stadium ended in a 4–3 defeat. Eight days later, Liverpool travelled to the City Ground to take on Nottingham Forest in their very first Premier League game, but came away 1–0 losers after a Teddy Sheringham goal. Three days later, the Reds recorded their first win, goals and points at Anfield in a 2–1 win over Sheffield United, with Mark Walters opening the goalscoring followed by Paul Stewart in the second half. However, the visit of Arsenal to Anfield four days after that brought major disappointment as the North Londoners ran out 2–0 winners. The next two games (away visits to Ipswich Town and Leeds) both ended in 2–2 draws, with 70th minute penalties from Jan Molby in both of these games.

Liverpool's first month of the new Premier League had been a major disappointment, with one win, two draws and two defeats, leaving them a lowly 16th out of 22 clubs.

=== September ===
The second month of Liverpool's season was similar to the first – bringing one draw (at home to Southampton), one win (at home to Chelsea) and three defeats (at the hands of Sheffield United, Aston Villa and Wimbledon). They were now 19th in the league, with only goal difference keeping them out of relegation places at the end of the second month of a season in a league where they had been expected to challenge for the title, which was currently being contested by some of the most unlikely sides including Norwich City, Coventry City and Queen's Park Rangers as well as big spending Manchester United and Blackburn Rovers.

Liverpool's European adventure began on 16 September, with a 6–1 home demolition of Apollon Limassol (the Cypriot cup winners) in which Ian Rush scored four goals and Paul Stewart was on target twice in the first round first leg of the European Cup Winners' Cup. The return leg in Cyprus two weeks later saw Liverpool progress to the next stage with a 2–1 win thanks to another goal from Rush as well as another from Don Hutchison.

The Football League Cup quest began on 22 September, when Division Three Chesterfield gave the Reds a scare by drawing 4–4 with them at Anfield.

=== October ===
Liverpool's terrible start to the season gave way to a slight improvement in October. The month began well with a 1–0 home win over Sheffield Wednesday in which Don Hutchison scored the only goal, and two weeks later only a late equaliser from Mark Hughes denied them an away win over Manchester United, forcing a 2–2 draw. The following Saturday saw an impressive 4–1 home win over surprise title challengers Norwich, but the month ended with a return to Liverpool's losing ways as they were beaten 2–0 by Tottenham at White Hart Lane, where Spurs' first goal came from a spectacular volley by Nayim.

They ended the month in 14th place in the league – an improvement on the previous month but still well short of top spot. Any hopes that Chesterfield might have had of achieving a giant killing feat over the Reds ended at Saltergate on 6 October, when Graeme Souness's men achieved a 4–1 win to put them through to the third round. They were drawn with Sheffield United, who held them to a goalless draw at Bramall Lane on 28 October.

On the European scene, Liverpool's chances of glory in the Cup Winners' Cup took a severe blow when they were beaten 4–2 in Russia by Spartak Moscow.

=== November ===
Liverpool saw league action just three times in London – and won on each occasions. Middlesbrough visited Anfield on 7 November, and were on the receiving end on a 4–1 defeat in which Ronny Rosenthal scored twice. Rosenthal was the only man on the scoresheet 16 days later as the Reds beat QPR 1–0 at Loftus Road. Five days later, Liverpool's surge continued when they demolished Crystal Palace 5–0 at Anfield. They had now climbed to eighth place.

The League Cup third round replay against Sheffield United at Anfield saw them run out 3–0 victors thanks to a Steve McManaman brace and a Mike Marsh penalty. However, any remaining hopes of European glory were ended on 4 November, when they suffered a 2–0 home defeat to Spartak Moscow in the second leg of the second round.

=== December ===
Liverpool's league revival stalled in November as they won just one league matches out of four. They lost 2–1 to Everton in the Merseyside derby at Goodison Park on 7 December, though two goals from Mark Walters six days later gave them a 2–1 home win over Blackburn Rovers. Six days before Christmas, however, the Reds were on the receiving end of one of the biggest league shocks of the season as they were crushed 5–1 by Coventry at Highfield Road. Their final action of 1992 came on 28 December, when they drew 1–1 at home to Manchester City. They had now slipped to 11th place.

December also saw the end of Liverpool's attempt to win a record fifth League Cup, as they were beaten 2–1 by Crystal Palace in the fourth round replay after a 1–1 draw in the first match.

=== January ===
1993 began with a 2–2 draw with Bolton Wanderers in the FA Cup third round at Burnden Park, with the replay at Anfield 10 days later sparking arguably the biggest cup upset of the season as the Reds lost 2–0 at home to the Division Two promotion chasers.

Liverpool fared little better in the league this month, beginning with a 2–1 home defeat to title chasers Aston Villa, followed by a 2–0 defeat at Wimbledon, before a John Barnes penalty against Arsenal at Highbury on 31 January, ensured that the month would not end winless for the Reds, who were still only 12th in the league.

=== February ===
Liverpool's dismal form continued into February as they failed to win a single game all month, and speculation was mounting that manager Graeme Souness would soon be forced out of the club. The month began with goalless draws against Forest and Chelsea, before the Reds lost 2–1 at Southampton. A goalless draw followed at home to Ipswich, whose recent surge in form had seen them look like outsiders for the league title a season after promotion. A 1–1 draw at Sheffield Wednesday ensured that Liverpool had gone a whole month with five games but no wins. They had managed just two goals all month, both from Don Hutchison.

=== March ===
Liverpool's action for March kicked off with a 2–1 home defeat by a Manchester United side who went top on their way to their first top division title since 1967, with left Liverpool a lowly 15th in the league and just five places and three points clear of the relegation zone. The game also saw Ian Rush score his first league goal of 1993 and only his fourth of the whole season in the league, and marked the start of a turnaround in fortunes for both player and club.

Four days later, QPR were the visitors at Anfield as Rush was the only man on the scoresheet in a 1–0 win for the hosts. Three days later, Rush was joined by Don Hutchison on the scoresheet as the Reds won 2–1 at Middlesbrough – a result which pushed the Ayresome Park club deeper into relegation trouble. 20 March, was the day of the second Merseyside derby of the season, in which Liverpool ran out 1–0 winners and Ronny Rosenthal scored the only goal of the game. The resurgence was put on hold when Liverpool's last game of the month saw the held to a 1–1 draw at relegation-threatened Crystal Palace, but Rush was on target for the fourth time in five games and his team had now lifted themselves to 10th place.

=== April ===
April began badly for the Reds as a 4–1 defeat at Blackburn (managed by former Liverpool player and boss Kenny Dalglish) suggested that another decline was setting in and that the Reds could be sucked back into the unthinkable relegation battle. However, a week later their resurgence was resumed with Ian Rush once again the inspiration as they defeated Oldham 1–0 at Anfield. Rush was on the scoresheet yet again in the next game as they were held to a 1–1 draw by Manchester City at Maine Road. Undoubtedly the best game of the month came on 17 April, when the Reds demolished Coventry 4–0 at Anfield, with Mark Walters scoring a hat-trick and defender David Burrows scoring the other goal. The month ended with a 2–0 home win over Leeds that completed Liverpool's impressive rise from 15th place to fifth within the space of a few weeks. The relegation fear was now long gone, though it was too late for Liverpool to make a challenge for one of the two UEFA Cup places.

=== May ===
With the pressure off the Reds as the end of the season loomed, they lost 1–0 to third placed Norwich at the beginning of the month before being beaten 3–2 by an Oldham side who were on the way to completing a survival act which was little short of miraculous. The campaign ended on 8 May, with an impressive 6–2 demolition of Tottenham with goals from Ian Rush (twice), John Barnes (twice), a penalty from Mark Walters and an own goal from Tottenham's Stuart Nethercott, to secure a sixth-place finish for the second season running. Manager Souness was not at the game, instead attending the match between Coventry City and Leeds United in order to scout Coventry forward Peter Ndlovu.
