= List of Liverpool F.C. matches in international competitions =

The following table gives detailed results of the games played by Liverpool Football Club in international football competitions (European Cup/UEFA Champions League, UEFA Cup/Europa League, Inter-Cities Fairs Cup, European/UEFA Cup Winners' Cup, European/UEFA Super Cup, Intercontinental Cup and FIFA Club World Championship/Club World Cup).

== List of matches ==
Note: Liverpool score always listed first.

Season	Competition	Round	Opponent	Home	Away	Agg.
1964–65	European Cup	PR	(Iceland) KR	6–1	5–0	11–1
1964–65	European Cup	1R	(Belgium) Anderlecht	3–0	1–0	4–0
1964–65	European Cup	QF	(West Germany) 1. FC Köln	0–0	0–0	0–0 (po 2–2) (c)
1964–65	European Cup	SF	(Italy) Internazionale	3–1	0–3	3–4
1965–66	Cup Winners' Cup	1R	(Italy) Juventus	2–0	0–1	2–1
1965–66	Cup Winners' Cup	2R	(Belgium) Standard Liège	3–1	2–1	5–2
1965–66	Cup Winners' Cup	QF	(Hungary) Budapest Honvéd	2–0	0–0	2–0
1965–66	Cup Winners' Cup	SF	(Scotland) Celtic	2–0	0–1	2–1
1965–66	Cup Winners' Cup	Final	(West Germany) Borussia Dortmund	1–2 (a.e.t.)		
1966–67	European Cup	1R	(Romania) Petrolul Ploiești	2–0	1–3	3–3 (po 2–0)
1966–67	European Cup	2R	(Netherlands) Ajax	2–2	1–5	3–7
1967–68	Inter-Cities Fairs Cup	1R	(Sweden) Malmö FF	2–1	2–0	4–1
1967–68	Inter-Cities Fairs Cup	2R	(West Germany) 1860 Munich	8–0	1–2	9–2
1967–68	Inter-Cities Fairs Cup	3R	(Hungary) Ferencváros	0–1	0–1	0–2
1968–69	Inter-Cities Fairs Cup	1R	(Spain) Athletic Bilbao	2–1 (a.e.t.)	1–2	3–3 (c)
1969–70	Inter-Cities Fairs Cup	1R	(Republic of Ireland) Dundalk	10–0	4–0	14–0
1969–70	Inter-Cities Fairs Cup	2R	(Portugal) Vitória Setúbal	3–2	0–1	3–3 (a)
1970–71	Inter-Cities Fairs Cup	1R	(Hungary) Ferencváros	1–0	1–1	2–1
1970–71	Inter-Cities Fairs Cup	2R	(Romania) Dinamo București	3–0	1–1	4–1
1970–71	Inter-Cities Fairs Cup	3R	(Scotland) Hibernian	2–0	1–0	3–0
1970–71	Inter-Cities Fairs Cup	QF	(West Germany) Bayern Munich	3–0	1–1	4–1
1970–71	Inter-Cities Fairs Cup	SF	(England) Leeds United	0–1	0–0	0–1
1971–72	Cup Winners' Cup	1R	(Switzerland) Servette	2–0	1–2	3–2
1971–72	Cup Winners' Cup	2R	(West Germany) Bayern Munich	0–0	1–3	1–3
1972–73	UEFA Cup	1R	(West Germany) Eintracht Frankfurt	2–0	0–0	2–0
1972–73	UEFA Cup	2R	(Greece) AEK Athens	3–0	3–1	6–1
1972–73	UEFA Cup	3R	(East Germany) Dynamo Berlin	3–1	0–0	3–1
1972–73	UEFA Cup	QF	(East Germany) Dynamo Dresden	2–0	1–0	3–0
1972–73	UEFA Cup	SF	(England) Tottenham Hotspur	1–0	1–2	2–2 (a)
1972–73	UEFA Cup	Final	(West Germany) Borussia Mönchengladbach	3–0	0–2	3–2
1973–74	European Cup	1R	(Luxembourg) Jeunesse Esch	2–0	1–1	3–1
1973–74	European Cup	2R	(Socialist Federal Republic of Yugoslavia) Red Star Belgrade	1–2	1–2	2–4
1974–75	Cup Winners' Cup	1R	(Norway) Strømsgodset	11–0	1–0	12–0
1974–75	Cup Winners' Cup	2R	(Hungary) Ferencváros	1–1	0–0	1–1 (a)
1975–76	UEFA Cup	1R	(Scotland) Hibernian	3–1	0–1	3–2
1975–76	UEFA Cup	2R	(Spain) Real Sociedad	6–0	3–1	9–1
1975–76	UEFA Cup	3R	(Poland) Śląsk Wrocław	3–0	2–1	5–1
1975–76	UEFA Cup	QF	(East Germany) Dynamo Dresden	2–1	0–0	2–1
1975–76	UEFA Cup	SF	(Spain) Barcelona	1–1	1–0	2–1
1975–76	UEFA Cup	Final	(Belgium) Club Brugge	3–2	1–1	4–3
1976–77	European Cup	1R	(Northern Ireland) Crusaders	2–0	5–0	7–0
1976–77	European Cup	2R	(Turkey) Trabzonspor	3–0	0–1	3–1
1976–77	European Cup	QF	(France) Saint-Étienne	3–1	0–1	3–2
1976–77	European Cup	SF	(Switzerland) Zürich	3–0	3–1	6–1
1976–77	European Cup	Final	(West Germany) Borussia Mönchengladbach	3–1		
1977–78	European Super Cup	Final	(West Germany) Hamburg SV	6–0	1–1	7–1
1977–78	European Cup	1R	Bye			
1977–78	European Cup	2R	(East Germany) Dynamo Dresden	5–1	1–2	6–3
1977–78	European Cup	QF	(Portugal) Benfica	4–1	2–1	6–2
1977–78	European Cup	SF	(West Germany) Borussia Mönchengladbach	3–0	1–2	4–2
1977–78	European Cup	Final	(Belgium) Club Brugge	1–0		
1978–79	European Cup	1R	(England) Nottingham Forest	0–0	0–2	0–2
1978–79	European Super Cup	Final	(Belgium) Anderlecht	2–1	1–3	3–4
1979–80	European Cup	1R	(Soviet Union) Dinamo Tbilisi	2–1	0–3	2–4
1980–81	European Cup	1R	(Finland) OPS	10–1	1–1	11–2
1980–81	European Cup	2R	(Scotland) Aberdeen	4–0	1–0	5–0
1980–81	European Cup	QF	(Bulgaria) CSKA Sofia	5–1	1–0	6–1
1980–81	European Cup	SF	(West Germany) Bayern Munich	0–0	1–1	1–1 (a)
1980–81	European Cup	Final	(Spain) Real Madrid	1–0		
1981–82	Intercontinental Cup	Final	(Brazil) Flamengo	0–3		
1981–82	European Cup	1R	(Finland) OPS	7–0	1–0	8–0
1981–82	European Cup	2R	(Netherlands) AZ Alkmaar	3–2	2–2	5–4
1981–82	European Cup	QF	(Bulgaria) CSKA Sofia	1–0	0–2 (a.e.t.)	1–2
1982–83	European Cup	1R	(Republic of Ireland) Dundalk	1–0	4–1	5–1
1982–83	European Cup	2R	(Finland) HJK Helsinki	5–0	0–1	5–1
1982–83	European Cup	QF	(Poland) Widzew Łódź	3–2	0–2	3–4
1983–84	European Cup	1R	(Denmark) Odense	5–0	1–0	6–0
1983–84	European Cup	2R	(Spain) Athletic Bilbao	0–0	1–0	1–0
1983–84	European Cup	QF	(Portugal) Benfica	1–0	4–1	5–1
1983–84	European Cup	SF	(Romania) Dinamo București	1–0	2–1	3–1
1983–84	European Cup	Final	(Italy) AS Roma	1–1 (a.e.t.) (4–2 p)		
1984–85	Intercontinental Cup	Final	(Argentina) Independiente	0–1		
1984–85	European Super Cup	Final	(Italy) Juventus	0–2		
1984–85	European Cup	1R	(Poland) Lech Poznań	4–0	1–0	5–0
1984–85	European Cup	2R	(Portugal) Benfica	3–1	0–1	3–2
1984–85	European Cup	QF	Austria Vienna	4–1	1–1	5–2
1984–85	European Cup	SF	(Greece) Panathinaikos	4–0	1–0	5–0
1984–85	European Cup	Final	(Italy) Juventus	0–1		
1991–92	UEFA Cup	1R	(Finland) Kuusysi Lahti	6–1	0–1	6–2
1991–92	UEFA Cup	2R	(France) Auxerre	3–0	0–2	3–2
1991–92	UEFA Cup	3R	(Austria) Swarovski Tirol	4–0	2–0	6–0
1991–92	UEFA Cup	QF	(Italy) Genoa	1–2	0–2	1–4
1992–93	Cup Winners' Cup	1R	(Cyprus) Apollon Limassol	6–1	2–1	8–2
1992–93	Cup Winners' Cup	2R	(Russia) Spartak Moscow	0–2	2–4	2–6
1995–96	UEFA Cup	1R	(Russia) Spartak Vladikavkaz	0–0	2–1	2–1
1995–96	UEFA Cup	2R	(Denmark) Brøndby	0–1	0–0	0–1
1996–97	Cup Winners' Cup	1R	(Finland) MyPa	3–1	1–0	4–1
1996–97	Cup Winners' Cup	2R	(Switzerland) FC Sion	6–3	2–1	8–4
1996–97	Cup Winners' Cup	QF	(Norway) Brann	3–0	1–1	4–1
1996–97	Cup Winners' Cup	SF	(France) Paris Saint-Germain	2–0	0–3	2–3
1997–98	UEFA Cup	1R	(Scotland) Celtic	0–0	2–2	2–2 (a)
1997–98	UEFA Cup	2R	(France) Strasbourg	2–0	0–3	2–3
1998–99	UEFA Cup	1R	(Slovakia) Košice	5–0	3–0	8–0
1998–99	UEFA Cup	2R	(Spain) Valencia	0–0	2–2	2–2 (a)
1998–99	UEFA Cup	3R	(Spain) Celta Vigo	0–1	1–3	1–4
2000–01	UEFA Cup	1R	(Romania) Rapid București	0–0	1–0	1–0
2000–01	UEFA Cup	2R	(Czech Republic) Slovan Liberec	1–0	3–2	4–2
2000–01	UEFA Cup	3R	(Greece) Olympiakos	2–0	2–2	4–2
2000–01	UEFA Cup	4R	(Italy) AS Roma	0–1	2–0	2–1
2000–01	UEFA Cup	QF	(Portugal) FC Porto	2–0	0–0	2–0
2000–01	UEFA Cup	SF	(Spain) Barcelona	1–0	0–0	1–0
2000–01	UEFA Cup	Final	(Spain) Alavés	5–4 (a.e.t.)		
2001–02	UEFA Super Cup	Final	(Germany) Bayern Munich	3–2		
2001–02	Champions League	QR3	(Finland) Haka	4–1	5–0	9–1
2001–02	Champions League	GS1	(Portugal) Boavista	1–1	1–1	1st out of 4
2001–02	Champions League	GS1	(Germany) Borussia Dortmund	2–0	0–0	1st out of 4
2001–02	Champions League	GS1	(Ukraine) Dynamo Kyiv	1–0	2–1	1st out of 4
2001–02	Champions League	GS2	(Spain) Barcelona	1–3	0–0	2nd out of 4
2001–02	Champions League	GS2	(Italy) AS Roma	2–0	0–0	2nd out of 4
2001–02	Champions League	GS2	(Turkey) Galatasaray	0–0	1–1	2nd out of 4
2001–02	Champions League	QF	(Germany) Bayer Leverkusen	1–0	2–4	3–4
2002–03	Champions League	GS1	(Spain) Valencia	0–1	0–2	3rd out of 4
2002–03	Champions League	GS1	(Switzerland) Basel	1–1	3–3	3rd out of 4
2002–03	Champions League	GS1	(Russia) Spartak Moscow	5–0	3–1	3rd out of 4
2002–03	UEFA Cup	3R	(Netherlands) Vitesse	1–0	1–0	2–0
2002–03	UEFA Cup	4R	(France) Auxerre	2–0	1–0	3–0
2002–03	UEFA Cup	QF	(Scotland) Celtic	0–2	1–1	1–3
2003–04	UEFA Cup	1R	(Slovenia) Olimpija Ljubljana	3–0	1–1	4–1
2003–04	UEFA Cup	2R	(Romania) Steaua Bucureşti	1–0	1–1	2–1
2003–04	UEFA Cup	3R	(Bulgaria) Levski Sofia	2–0	4–2	6–2
2003–04	UEFA Cup	4R	(France) Marseille	1–1	1–2	2–3
2004–05	Champions League	QR3	(Austria) Grazer AK	0–1	2–0	2–1
2004–05	Champions League	GS	(France) Monaco	2–0	0–1	2nd out of 4
2004–05	Champions League	GS	(Greece) Olympiakos	3–1	0–1	2nd out of 4
2004–05	Champions League	GS	(Spain) Deportivo La Coruña	0–0	1–0	2nd out of 4
2004–05	Champions League	R16	(Germany) Bayer Leverkusen	3–1	3–1	6–2
2004–05	Champions League	QF	(Italy) Juventus	2–1	0–0	2–1
2004–05	Champions League	SF	(England) Chelsea	1–0	0–0	1–0
2004–05	Champions League	Final	(Italy) Milan	3–3 (a.e.t.) (3–2 p)		
2005–06	UEFA Super Cup	Final	(Russia) CSKA Moscow	3–1 (a.e.t.)		
2005–06	Club World Championship	SF	(Costa Rica) Saprissa	3–0		
2005–06	Club World Championship	Final	(Brazil) São Paulo	0–1		
2005–06	Champions League	QR1	(Wales) Total Network Solutions	3–0	3–0	6–0
2005–06	Champions League	QR2	(Lithuania) FBK Kaunas	2–0	3–1	5–1
2005–06	Champions League	QR3	(Bulgaria) CSKA Sofia	0–1	3–1	3–2
2005–06	Champions League	GS	(Spain) Real Betis	0–0	2–1	1st out of 4
2005–06	Champions League	GS	(England) Chelsea	0–0	0–0	1st out of 4
2005–06	Champions League	GS	(Belgium) Anderlecht	3–0	1–0	1st out of 4
2005–06	Champions League	R16	(Portugal) Benfica	0–2	0–1	0–3
2006–07	Champions League	QR3	(Israel) Maccabi Haifa	2–1	1–1	3–2
2006–07	Champions League	GS	(Netherlands) PSV Eindhoven	2–0	0–0	1st out of 4
2006–07	Champions League	GS	(Turkey) Galatasaray	3–2	2–3	1st out of 4
2006–07	Champions League	GS	(France) Bordeaux	3–0	1–0	1st out of 4
2006–07	Champions League	R16	(Spain) Barcelona	0–1	2–1	2–2 (a)
2006–07	Champions League	QF	(Netherlands) PSV Eindhoven	1–0	3–0	4–0
2006–07	Champions League	SF	(England) Chelsea	1–0 (a.e.t.)	0–1	1–1 (4–1 p)
2006–07	Champions League	Final	(Italy) Milan	1–2		
2007–08	Champions League	QR3	(France) Toulouse	4–0	1–0	5–0
2007–08	Champions League	GS	(Portugal) FC Porto	4–1	1–1	2nd out of 4
2007–08	Champions League	GS	(France) Marseille	0–1	4–0	2nd out of 4
2007–08	Champions League	GS	(Turkey) Beşiktaş	8–0	1–2	2nd out of 4
2007–08	Champions League	R16	(Italy) Internazionale	2–0	1–0	3–0
2007–08	Champions League	QF	(England) Arsenal	4–2	1–1	5–3
2007–08	Champions League	SF	(England) Chelsea	1–1	2–3 (a.e.t.)	3–4
2008–09	Champions League	QR3	(Belgium) Standard Liège	1–0 (a.e.t.)	0–0	1–0
2008–09	Champions League	GS	(France) Marseille	1–0	2–1	1st out of 4
2008–09	Champions League	GS	(Netherlands) PSV Eindhoven	3–1	3–1	1st out of 4
2008–09	Champions League	GS	(Spain) Atlético Madrid	1–1	1–1	1st out of 4
2008–09	Champions League	R16	(Spain) Real Madrid	4–0	1–0	5–0
2008–09	Champions League	QF	(England) Chelsea	1–3	4–4	5–7
2009–10	Champions League	GS	(Hungary) Debrecen	1–0	1–0	3rd out of 4
2009–10	Champions League	GS	(Italy) Fiorentina	1–2	0–2	3rd out of 4
2009–10	Champions League	GS	(France) Lyon	1–2	1–1	3rd out of 4
2009–10	Europa League	R32	(Romania) Unirea Urziceni	1–0	3–1	4–1
2009–10	Europa League	R16	(France) Lille	3–0	0–1	3–1
2009–10	Europa League	QF	(Portugal) Benfica	4–1	1–2	5–3
2009–10	Europa League	SF	(Spain) Atlético Madrid	2–1 (a.e.t.)	0–1	2–2 (a)
2010–11	Europa League	QR3	(North Macedonia) Rabotnički	2–0	2–0	4–0
2010–11	Europa League	PO	(Turkey) Trabzonspor	1–0	2–1	3–1
2010–11	Europa League	GS	(Romania) Steaua Bucureşti	4–1	1–1	1st out of 4
2010–11	Europa League	GS	(Netherlands) Utrecht	0–0	0–0	1st out of 4
2010–11	Europa League	GS	(Italy) Napoli	3–1	0–0	1st out of 4
2010–11	Europa League	R32	(Czech Republic) Sparta Prague	1–0	0–0	1–0
2010–11	Europa League	R16	(Portugal) Braga	0–0	0–1	0–1
2012–13	Europa League	QR3	(Belarus) Gomel	3–0	1–0	4–0
2012–13	Europa League	PO	(Scotland) Heart of Midlothian	1–1	1–0	2–1
2012–13	Europa League	GS	(Switzerland) Young Boys	2–2	5–3	1st out of 4
2012–13	Europa League	GS	(Italy) Udinese	2–3	1–0	1st out of 4
2012–13	Europa League	GS	(Russia) Anzhi Makhachkala	1–0	0–1	1st out of 4
2012–13	Europa League	R32	(Russia) Zenit Saint Petersburg	3–1	0–2	3–3 (a)
2014–15	Champions League	GS	(Bulgaria) Ludogorets Razgrad	2–1	2–2	3rd out of 4
2014–15	Champions League	GS	(Switzerland) Basel	1–1	0–1	3rd out of 4
2014–15	Champions League	GS	(Spain) Real Madrid	0–3	0–1	3rd out of 4
2014–15	Europa League	R32	(Turkey) Beşiktaş	1–0	0–1 (a.e.t.)	1–1 (4–5 p)
2015–16	Europa League	GS	(France) Bordeaux	2–1	1–1	1st out of 4
2015–16	Europa League	GS	(Switzerland) Sion	1–1	0–0	1st out of 4
2015–16	Europa League	GS	(Russia) Rubin Kazan	1–1	1–0	1st out of 4
2015–16	Europa League	R32	(Germany) FC Augsburg	1–0	0–0	1–0
2015–16	Europa League	R16	(England) Manchester United	2–0	1–1	3–1
2015–16	Europa League	QF	(Germany) Borussia Dortmund	4–3	1–1	5–4
2015–16	Europa League	SF	(Spain) Villarreal	3–0	0–1	3–1
2015–16	Europa League	Final	(Spain) Sevilla	1–3		
2017–18	Champions League	PO	(Germany) 1899 Hoffenheim	4–2	2–1	6–3
2017–18	Champions League	GS	(Spain) Sevilla	2–2	3–3	1st out of 4
2017–18	Champions League	GS	(Russia) Spartak Moscow	7–0	1–1	1st out of 4
2017–18	Champions League	GS	(Slovenia) Maribor	3–0	7–0	1st out of 4
2017–18	Champions League	R16	(Portugal) FC Porto	0–0	5–0	5–0
2017–18	Champions League	QF	(England) Manchester City	3–0	2–1	5–1
2017–18	Champions League	SF	(Italy) AS Roma	5–2	2–4	7–6
2017–18	Champions League	Final	(Spain) Real Madrid	1–3		
2018–19	Champions League	GS	(France) Paris Saint-Germain	3–2	1–2	2nd out of 4
2018–19	Champions League	GS	(Italy) Napoli	1–0	0–1	2nd out of 4
2018–19	Champions League	GS	(Serbia) Red Star Belgrade	4–0	0–2	2nd out of 4
2018–19	Champions League	R16	(Germany) Bayern Munich	0–0	3–1	3–1
2018–19	Champions League	QF	(Portugal) FC Porto	2–0	4–1	6–1
2018–19	Champions League	SF	(Spain) Barcelona	4–0	0–3	4–3
2018–19	Champions League	Final	(England) Tottenham Hotspur	2–0		
2019–20	UEFA Super Cup	Final	(England) Chelsea	2–2 (a.e.t.) (5–4 p)		
2019–20	Club World Cup	SF	(Mexico) Monterrey	2–1		
2019–20	Club World Cup	Final	(Brazil) Flamengo	1–0 (a.e.t.)		
2019–20	Champions League	GS	(Italy) Napoli	1–1	0–2	1st out of 4
2019–20	Champions League	GS	(Austria) Red Bull Salzburg	4–3	2–0	1st out of 4
2019–20	Champions League	GS	(Belgium) Genk	2–1	4–1	1st out of 4
2019–20	Champions League	R16	(Spain) Atlético Madrid	2–3 (a.e.t.)	0–1	2–4
2020–21	Champions League	GS	(Netherlands) Ajax	1–0	1–0	1st out of 4
2020–21	Champions League	GS	(Denmark) Midtjylland	2–0	1–1	1st out of 4
2020–21	Champions League	GS	(Italy) Atalanta	0–2	5–0	1st out of 4
2020–21	Champions League	R16	(Germany) RB Leipzig	2–0	2–0	4–0
2020–21	Champions League	QF	(Spain) Real Madrid	0–0	1–3	1–3
2021–22	Champions League	GS	(Italy) Milan	3–2	2–1	1st out of 4
2021–22	Champions League	GS	(Portugal) FC Porto	2–0	5–1	1st out of 4
2021–22	Champions League	GS	(Spain) Atlético Madrid	2–0	3–2	1st out of 4
2021–22	Champions League	R16	(Italy) Internazionale	0–1	2–0	2–1
2021–22	Champions League	QF	(Portugal) Benfica	3–3	3–1	6–4
2021–22	Champions League	SF	(Spain) Villarreal	2–0	3–2	5–2
2021–22	Champions League	Final	(Spain) Real Madrid	0–1		
2022–23	Champions League	GS	(Italy) Napoli	2–0	1–4	2nd out of 4
2022–23	Champions League	GS	(Netherlands) Ajax	2–1	3–0	2nd out of 4
2022–23	Champions League	GS	(Scotland) Rangers	2–0	7–1	2nd out of 4
2022–23	Champions League	R16	(Spain) Real Madrid	2–5	0–1	2–6
2023–24	Europa League	GS	(Austria) LASK	4–0	3–1	1st out of 4
2023–24	Europa League	GS	(Belgium) Union Saint-Gilloise	2–0	1–2	1st out of 4
2023–24	Europa League	GS	(France) Toulouse	5–1	2–3	1st out of 4
2023–24	Europa League	KPO	Bye			
2023–24	Europa League	R16	(Czech Republic) Sparta Prague	6–1	5–1	11–2
2023–24	Europa League	QF	(Italy) Atalanta	0–3	1–0	1–3
2024–25	Champions League	LP	(Italy) Milan	—N/a	3–1	1st out of 36
2024–25	Champions League	LP	(Italy) Bologna	2–0	—N/a	1st out of 36
2024–25	Champions League	LP	(Germany) RB Leipzig	—N/a	1–0	1st out of 36
2024–25	Champions League	LP	(Germany) Bayer Leverkusen	4–0	—N/a	1st out of 36
2024–25	Champions League	LP	(Spain) Real Madrid	2–0	—N/a	1st out of 36
2024–25	Champions League	LP	(Spain) Girona	—N/a	1–0	1st out of 36
2024–25	Champions League	LP	(France) Lille	2–1	—N/a	1st out of 36
2024–25	Champions League	LP	(Netherlands) PSV Eindhoven	—N/a	2–3	1st out of 36
2024–25	Champions League	KPO	Bye			
2024–25	Champions League	R16	(France) Paris Saint-Germain	0–1 (a.e.t.)	1–0	1–1 (1–4 p)
2025–26	Champions League	LP	(Spain) Atlético Madrid	3–2	—N/a	3rd out of 36
2025–26	Champions League	LP	(Turkey) Galatasaray	—N/a	0–1	3rd out of 36
2025–26	Champions League	LP	(Germany) Eintracht Frankfurt	—N/a	5–1	3rd out of 36
2025–26	Champions League	LP	(Spain) Real Madrid	1–0	—N/a	3rd out of 36
2025–26	Champions League	LP	(Netherlands) PSV Eindhoven	1–4	—N/a	3rd out of 36
2025–26	Champions League	LP	(Italy) Internazionale	—N/a	1–0	3rd out of 36
2025–26	Champions League	LP	(France) Marseille	—N/a	3–0	3rd out of 36
2025–26	Champions League	LP	(Azerbaijan) Qarabağ	6–0	—N/a	3rd out of 36
2025–26	Champions League	KPO	Bye			
2025–26	Champions League	R16	(Turkey) Galatasaray	4–0	0–1	4–1
2025–26	Champions League	QF	(France) Paris Saint-Germain	0–2	0–2	0–4
2026–27	Champions League	LP	(Spain) Atlético Madrid	2–1	—N/a	TBD
2026–27	Champions League	LP	(Austria) LASK	—N/a	6–3	TBD
2026–27	Champions League	LP	(Spain) Villarreal	4–3	—N/a	TBD
2026–27	Champions League	LP	(Turkey) Fenerbahçe	—N/a		TBD
2026–27	Champions League	LP	(Belgium) Club Brugge	—N/a		TBD
2026–27	Champions League	LP	(Portugal) Porto		—N/a	TBD
2026–27	Champions League	LP	(Italy) Internazionale	—N/a		TBD
2026–27	Champions League	LP	(France) Lens		—N/a	TBD

Last updated: 20 October 2026
