= István Kozma =

István Kozma may refer to:

- István Kozma (footballer) (born 1964), Hungarian former footballer
- István Kozma (wrestler) (1939–1970), Hungarian wrestler
