= Don Hutchison =

Footballer (born 1971)

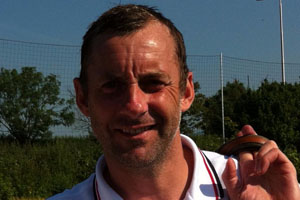
- Hutchison in 2013

Personal information
- Full name: Donald Hutchison
- Date of birth: 9 May 1971 (age 55)
- Place of birth: Gateshead, England
- Position: Midfielder

Senior career*
Years	Team	Apps	(Gls)
1989–1990	Hartlepool United	13	(2)
1991–1994	Liverpool	45	(7)
1990–1991	→ Hartlepool United (loan)	11	(0)
1994–1996	West Ham United	35	(11)
1996–1998	Sheffield United	78	(5)
1998–2000	Everton	75	(10)
2000–2001	Sunderland	40	(8)
2001–2005	West Ham United	63	(5)
2005	Millwall	11	(2)
2005–2006	→ Coventry City (loan)	6	(3)
2006–2007	Coventry City	32	(1)
2007–2008	Luton Town	21	(1)
Total		430	(55)

International career
1994	Scotland B	1	(0)
1999–2003	Scotland	26	(6)
- * Club domestic league appearances and goals

Donald Hutchison (born 9 May 1971) is a Scottish former professional footballer. Hutchison is a football television pundit and commentator for ESPN FC.

As a player, Hutchison was a midfielder, who played in the Premier League for Liverpool, West Ham United, Everton, and Sunderland. He also played in the Football League for Hartlepool United, Sheffield United, Millwall, Coventry City, and Luton Town. Born in England, Hutchison earned 26 caps for the Scotland national team and scored six international goals.

== Club career ==
=== Hartlepool United ===
Hutchison was born in Gateshead. He started his career in the 1989–90 season at Hartlepool United, under the direction of Cyril Knowles, in the Football League Fourth Division. Hutchison's talents were quickly spotted by bigger English clubs, and he was soon transferred to Liverpool, under the direction of Kenny Dalglish, for a fee of £175,000 on 27 November 1990. However, Hutchinson would remain on loan at Hartlepool for the 1990–91 season.

=== Liverpool ===
Hutchison joined Liverpool for the 1991–92 season, making three appearances, under Graeme Souness. Hutchison scored all seven of his club goals in the 1992–93 season, where he finished as their third top scorer behind Ian Rush and Mark Walters. Hutchison said of his time at Anfield, "I got on well with Graeme Souness and I think he quite liked my style of play because I got stuck in."

=== West Ham United ===
On 30 August 1994, Hutchison signed for West Ham United, under Harry Redknapp, for a fee of £1.5 million. Hutchison scored on his debut for West Ham a day later in a 3–1 home defeat to Newcastle United. Notably, he had a poor disciplinary record at West Ham. In thirty-nine games in his first spell with the club, Hutchison received eleven bookings and was sent off once, on 5 November 1994, in a home game against Leicester City. He was allowed to leave the club in January 1996.

=== Sheffield United ===
Hutchison next moved to Sheffield United in the Football League First Division, where he flourished under the management of Howard Kendall. Hutchison enjoyed good form there, and when Kendall left to manage Everton, he made Hutchison one of his signings.

=== Everton ===
Hutchison is one of a small group of players that has played for both rivals, Liverpool and Everton, after joining the latter in March 1998. Kendall spoke highly of Hutchison after his performance in a 1–0 win against a Blackburn side chasing European qualification on 14 March 1998, praising the range and vision of his passing in the face of some typically robust challenges by Tim Sherwood and Billy McKinlay. "I've given Don a role and he's got the opportunity to show people in the Premiership how good a player is," the Everton manager said. "I thought he was outstanding. Word will get round and I'm sure it will reach Craig Brown."

Hutchison found himself out of the side at the start of the 1998–99 season due to new manager Walter Smith's preference for his new signings Olivier Dacourt and John Collins. However, an injury to Collins that would keep him out for 6 months saw Hutchison return to the side and help Everton avoid relegation for the second season running.

1999–2000 saw Hutchison become captain when Dave Watson was out the side, and Hutchison produced great form both in midfield and when asked to play upfront, so much so he was courted by other Premier League sides. Hutchison turned down a new deal in March 2000, stating that he wanted parity with other top earners at the club, but had only been offered an extension on his current terms. He was subsequently dropped from the squad for these comments, but injuries to Kevin Campbell and Francis Jeffers saw Hutchison return to the side as a striker for the away game at Leicester City in April, where he scored the equalising goal. Despite his history with Liverpool, Everton fans were unhappy at the apparent future sale of Hutchison, who had only one year left on his deal. Although he retained his place until the end of the season, no new contract offer was made by the club and Hutchison moved onto Sunderland in a deal worth £2.5 million.

=== Sunderland ===
Hutchison transferred to Sunderland in July 2000 after failing to agree to a new contract with Everton. His good form continued and was a key player in the Wearsiders' second consecutive seventh-placed finish, so much so that he was the subject of another big offer.

=== Return to West Ham ===
In August 2001, Hutchison re-signed for West Ham United for £5 million for what was again a club record transfer fee. However, Hutchison sustained an anterior cruciate ligament injury in February 2002. When he finally regained full fitness, he found himself out of favour, having missed most of the 2003–04 season through injury, and was unable to force his way back into the first team in the 2004–05 season.

=== Millwall ===
Hutchison joined Millwall in August 2005 after being released at the start of the 2005–06 season by West Ham. He spent barely three months at the New Den, during which time he struggled to hold down a regular place in the starting XI. He left Millwall by mutual consent in November 2005, saying "I have left because of a lack of first-team football. At my age I need to be playing regularly."

=== Coventry City ===
In January 2006, Hutchison was given a contract with Coventry City until the end of the 2006–07 season, and signed a new one-year deal in June 2006. Manager Micky Adams said of him, "There's a saying that class is permanent and that applies to Don. He may not have the legs he had when he was younger but he possesses a fantastic ability to read the game." He was released by Coventry at the end of the 2006–07 season after an ankle injury restricted his appearances for the first team.

=== Luton Town ===
Hutchison signed for Luton Town on a one-year deal in July 2007. After scoring once for Luton, in the Football League Trophy against Northampton Town, he was released at the end of the season. He refused to take his final two wage packets from cash-strapped Luton, instead offering to sponsor two youth team players from the 2008–09 season.

== International career ==
Born and raised in Gateshead in north-eastern England, Hutchison consistently stated his desire to play for Scotland, citing a strong relationship with his Scottish father (a miner for 35 years, originally from Nairn). Hutchison first represented Scotland B in an international against Wales B in Wrexham in 1994. However, Hutchison had a disappointing game and was substituted, prompting an international exile of five years. He later said, "That night at Wrexham was a bit of an anti-climax, but I never thought that was the end of it."

Hutchison debuted for Scotland under Craig Brown, coming on as a substitute in the Euro 2000 qualifier at Celtic Park on 31 March 1999, while Hampden Park was under reconstruction. The result was a 2–1 win for the Czech Republic. In his next game he scored the only goal of the game to give Scotland a 1–0 victory against Germany in Bremen.

Hutchison scored in the Euro 2000 qualifier 2–1 win against Bosnia-Herzegovina in Sarajevo, along with Billy Dodds, then scored again in the 3–0 home win against Lithuania in the same competition. He was the scorer of the only goal at Wembley in the 1–0 win over England in the Euro 2000 play-off second leg in November 1999. Hutchison recalls: "I remember Christian Dailly playing a good pass to Neil McCann and him delivering a great cross. I finished it off and nothing was going to stop me celebrating a goal in front of the Tartan Army at Wembley." Scotland lost the tie 2–1, their quest to reach three consecutive major tournaments unravelled by a Paul Scholes double in the first leg at Hampden.

Hutchison's next international goal was in Dublin in a 2–1 friendly win against the Republic of Ireland. His last was in a World Cup qualifier away to San Marino. Scotland won all six games in which Hutchison scored for them.

Hutchison said in 2003, "My father died recently and he was my biggest fan. I cried when they played the national anthem before the Iceland game because Flower of Scotland was played at my dad's funeral. The happiest I ever saw him was when we beat England at Wembley thanks to my goal." He added, "Playing for Scotland for my dad was something I really wanted to do because it made him feel proud. I will never forget his face when we played England at Wembley."

== Personal life ==
Hutchison has worked as a football pundit and commentator for Talksport, TNT Sports and ESPN FC.

His son Max plays for Finn Harps F.C.

== Career statistics ==
Appearances and goals by national team and year
National team	Year	Apps	Goals
Scotland	1999	7	4
Scotland	2000	7	2
Scotland	2001	5	0
Scotland	2002	0	0
Scotland	2003	7	0
Total		26	6

Scores and results list Scotland's goal tally first, score column indicates score after each Hutchison goal.

List of international goals scored by Don Hutchison
No.	Date	Venue	Opponent	Score	Result	Competition
1	28 April 1999	Weserstadion, Bremen, Germany	Germany		1–0	Friendly
2	4 September 1999	Olympic Stadium, Sarajevo, Bosnia and Herzegovina	Bosnia and Herzegovina		2–1	UEFA Euro 2000 qualifying
3	9 October 1999	Hampden Park, Glasgow, Scotland	Lithuania		3–0	UEFA Euro 2000 qualifying
4	17 November 1999	Wembley Stadium, London, England	England		1–0	UEFA Euro 2000 qualifying play-off
5	30 May 2000	Lansdowne Road, Dublin, Republic of Ireland	Republic of Ireland		2–1	Friendly
6	7 October 2000	Stadio Olimpico, Serravalle, San Marino	San Marino		2–0	2002 FIFA World Cup qualification

== See also ==
- List of Scotland international footballers born outside Scotland
