= István Kozma (footballer) =

Hungarian footballer

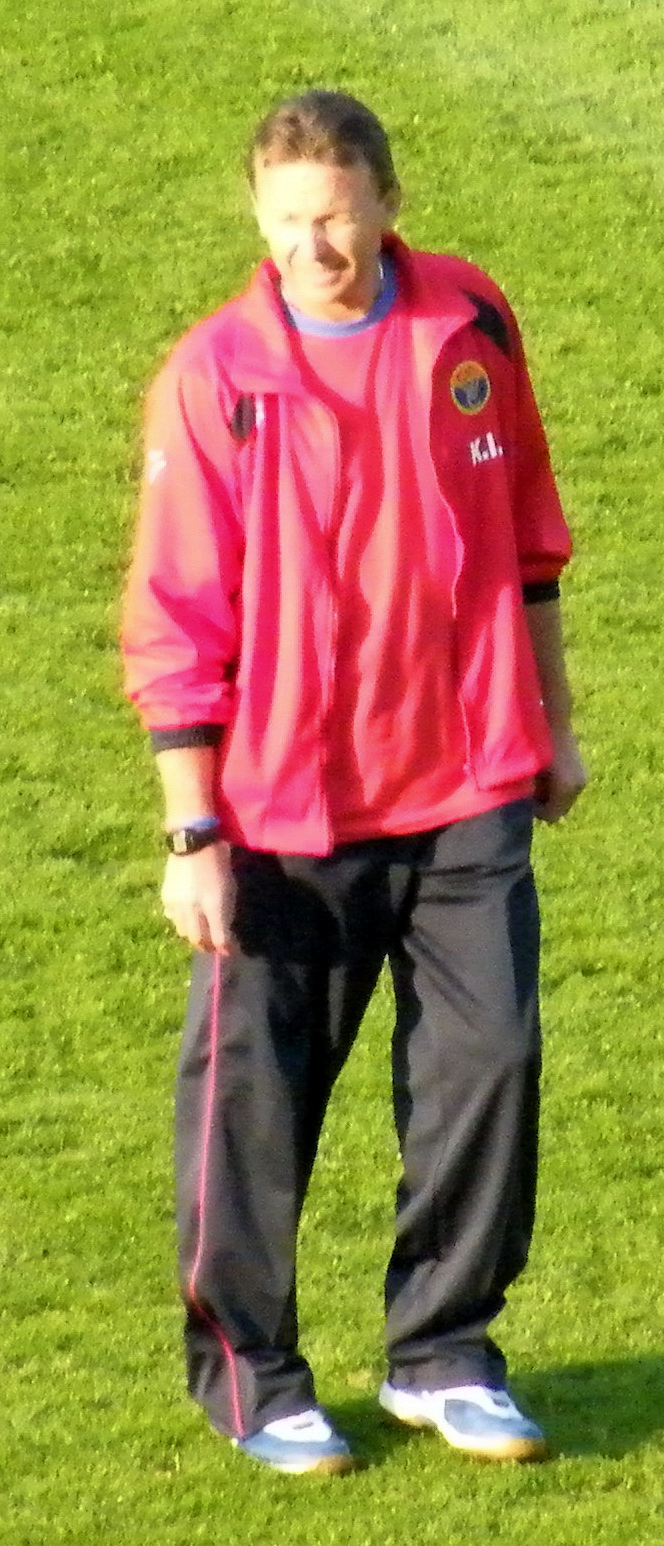
- Kozma in 2009

Personal information
- Date of birth: 3 December 1964 (age 61)
- Place of birth: Pásztó, Hungary
- Height: 1.85 m (6 ft 1 in)
- Position: Midfielder

Senior career*
Years	Team	Apps	(Gls)
?–?	Salgótarjáni TC		
1983–1989	Újpesti Dózsa	156	(10)
1989	Bordeaux		
1989–1992	Dunfermline Athletic	90	(8)
1992–1993	Liverpool	6	(0)
1993–1995	Újpest FC	58	(15)
1995–1997	APOEL	42	(5)
1997–1999	Újpest FC	33	(0)
1999	Videoton	14	(1)
2000	Tatabánya	11	(0)
2000–2001	Újpest FC	20	(3)
2001–2002	Ostbahn XI Wein		
2002–2003	Budafoki MTE		
2003–2004	Rákosmenti KSK		

International career
1986–1995	Hungary	40	(1)
1990	Scottish League XI	1	(0)

Managerial career
- 2006–2007: Vasas SC (assistant)
- 2013: Újpest FC
- * Club domestic league appearances and goals

István Kozma (born 3 December 1964) is a former Hungarian footballer who played as a midfielder. He was the first Hungarian player to ever play in the Premier League on 26 September 1992, when he appeared for Liverpool as a substitute against Wimbledon, playing 7 minutes.

Kozma began his career at Salgótarjáni TC in Hungary. He then moved to Újpest FC, followed by Bordeaux, and the Scottish team Dunfermline Athletic. At Dunfermline, he became a fan favourite playing in 103 matches. In 1992, he was purchased by Liverpool, making his debut in a match against Ipswich Town in the fifth round of the FA Cup but he never found his feet at Liverpool. He returned briefly to Újpest FC before playing for APOEL in Cyprus in 1995–96 where he led his team to the Double. The next season, he helped APOEL to win the Super Cup and the Cup again before moving back to Újpest for a third time, where he helped them to won the Nemzeti Bajnokság I in 1998. Kozma subsequently appeared for Videoton FC and FC Tatabánya, before finishing his professional career with a fourth spell at Újpest.

Kozma made his international debut for Hungary on 9 September 1986, going on to play 40 times for the national team.

== Career ==
=== Club ===
He began his career at Salgótarjáni TC in his native country of Hungary. Kozma then moved to Újpest FC and then to French Ligue 1 champions Bordeaux. In September 1989, he was signed by Jim Leishman for Scottish team Dunfermline Athletic for £600,000, a club record transfer fee.

At Dunfermline, Kozma became a "firm fan favourite" playing 103 times and scoring nine goals. In February 1992, he was a shock purchase for Liverpool, with Graeme Souness signing the Hungarian for £300,000. Kozma made his debut in a goalless draw against Ipswich Town in the fifth round of the FA Cup, but never looked like breaking into the first team at Liverpool. In the 1991–92 season he made five league appearances and two in the FA Cup. In the 1992–93 season, he played in the 1992 FA Charity Shield and then made one league appearance as a substitute and one further substitute appearance in the League Cup, before being released in July 1993. He was forced to leave the UK due to regulations affecting non-EU citizens, which required them to have played at least 75 per cent of their club and national team matches. With only 3 appearances following his transfer from Dunfermline, Kozma lost his visa. His limited performance at Liverpool earned him, in 2007, the dubious success of being rated by Times Online as the fourth worst ever player to play in the Premiership.

He then returned to Újpest FC, signing a one year deal. In 1995–96 he played for APOEL in Cyprus where, after amazing performances, he led his team to the Double. The next season, he helped APOEL to win the Super Cup and the Cup again, before moving back to Újpest for a third time, with whom he won the Nemzeti Bajnokság I in 1998. He subsequently appeared for Videoton FC and FC Tatabánya, before finishing his professional career with a fourth spell at Újpest. He subsequently signed for Austrian amateur side Ostbahn XI Wein and Hungarian lower-division teams Budafoki MTE and Rákosmenti KSK.

=== International ===
Kozma made his international debut for Hungary on 9 September 1986, coming on as a substitute in a 0-0 friendly draw with Norway. He went on to play 40 times for the national team until 1995, scoring once, in a 4-1 friendly win over Turkey on 5 September 1990.

Kozma also appeared for the Scottish Football League XI in a 1990 fixture against Scotland, to mark the centenary of the Scottish Football League. The match finished 1-0 to the League XI.

== Coaching career ==
From season 2006–07, he was working as an assistant manager at Vasas SC.

In May 2013, Kozma returned to Újpest as manager. After just five months, Kozma left his position at the club in October 2013, being sacked altogether after initially being transferred to the role of video analyst instead.

== Career statistics ==
=== Club ===
Appearances and goals by club, season and competition
Club	Season	League			National cup (Note: Includes FA Cup)		League cup (Note: Includes Football League Cup)		Continental		Other		Total	
Club	Season	Division	Apps	Goals	Apps	Goals	Apps	Goals	Apps	Goals	Apps	Goals	Apps	Goals
Újpesti Dózsa	1983–84	Nemzeti Bajnokság I	19	0			—		2 (Note: Appearances in UEFA Cup Winners' Cup)	0	—		21	0
Újpesti Dózsa	1984–85	Nemzeti Bajnokság I	23	1			—		0	0	—		23	1
Újpesti Dózsa	1985–86	Nemzeti Bajnokság I	27	0			—		0	0	—		27	0
Újpesti Dózsa	1986–87	Nemzeti Bajnokság I	29	2			—		0	0	—		29	2
Újpesti Dózsa	1987–88	Nemzeti Bajnokság I	28	2			—		2	0	—		30	2
Újpesti Dózsa	1988–89	Nemzeti Bajnokság I	30	5			—		4 (Note: Appearances in UEFA Cup)	0	—		34	5
Újpesti Dózsa	Total		156	10			—		8	0	—		164	10
Dunfermline Athletic	1989–90	Scottish Premier Division	33	6	4	0	1	0	—		—		38	6
Dunfermline Athletic	1990–91	Scottish Premier Division	34	2	1	0	2	0	—		—		37	2
Dunfermline Athletic	1991–92	Scottish Premier Division	23	0	1	0	4	1	—		—		28	1
Dunfermline Athletic	Total		90	8	6	0	7	1	—		—		103	9
Liverpool	1991–92	Football League First Division	5	0	2	0	0	0	—		—		7	0
Liverpool	1992–93	Football League First Division	1	0	0	0	1	0	—		1 (Note: One appearance in the FA Charity Shield)	0	3	0
Liverpool	Total		6	0	2	0	1	0	—		1	0	10	0
Újpest FC	1993–94	Nemzeti Bajnokság I	29	8	0	0	—		0	0	—		29	8
Újpest FC	1994–95	Nemzeti Bajnokság I	29	7	0	0	—		0	0	—		29	7
Újpest FC	Total		58	15	0	0	—		0	0	—		158	15
APOEL F.C.	1995–96	Cypriot First Division	20	2	0	0	—		4	0	—		24	2
APOEL F.C.	1996–97	Cypriot First Division	20	3	0	0	—		6	1	—		26	4
APOEL F.C.	Total		40	5	0	0	—		10	1	—		50	6
Újpest FC	1997–98	Nemzeti Bajnokság I	29	0	0	0	—		0	0	—		29	0
Újpest FC	1998–99	Nemzeti Bajnokság I	4	0	0	0	—		0	0	—		4	0
Újpest FC	Total		33	0	0	0	—		0	0	—		33	0
Videoton FC	1998–99	Nemzeti Bajnokság I	14	1	0	0	—		0	0	—		14	1
FC Tatabánya	1999–2000	Nemzeti Bajnokság I	11	0	0	0	—		0	0	—		11	0
Újpest FC	1999–2000	Nemzeti Bajnokság I	7	0	0	0	—		0	0	—		7	0
Újpest FC	2000–01	Nemzeti Bajnokság I	13	3	0	0	—		0	0	—		13	3
Újpest FC	Total		20	3	0	0	—		0	0	—		20	3
Career total			428	42	8	0	8	1	18	1	1	0	463	44

=== International ===
Appearances and goals by national team and year
National team	Year	Apps	Goals
Hungary	1986	1	0
Hungary	1987	0	0
Hungary	1988	10	0
Hungary	1989	8	0
Hungary	1990	5	1
Hungary	1991	5	0
Hungary	1992	0	0
Hungary	1993	0	0
Hungary	1994	5	0
Hungary	1995	6	0
Total		40	1

Hungary score listed first, score column indicates score after each Kozma goal

List of international goals scored by István Kozma
No.	Date	Venue	Cap	Opponent	Score	Result	Competition	Ref.
1	5 September 1990	Megyeri úti stadion, Újpest, Hungary	20	Turkey	2–0	4–1	Friendly	

== Honours ==
Dunfermline Athletic

- Scottish League Cup: Runner-up, 1991

APOEL

- Cypriot First Division: 1995–96
- Cypriot Cup: 1995–96, 1996–97
- Cypriot Super Cup: 1996, 1997

Ujpest

- Nemzeti Bajnokság I: 1997–98

== Cited works ==
- Jeffrey, Jim (2007). Hibernian Football Club Classic Matches. STADIA. ISBN 978-0-7524-4452-9.
