= Dean Saunders =

Welsh footballer & manager (born 1964)

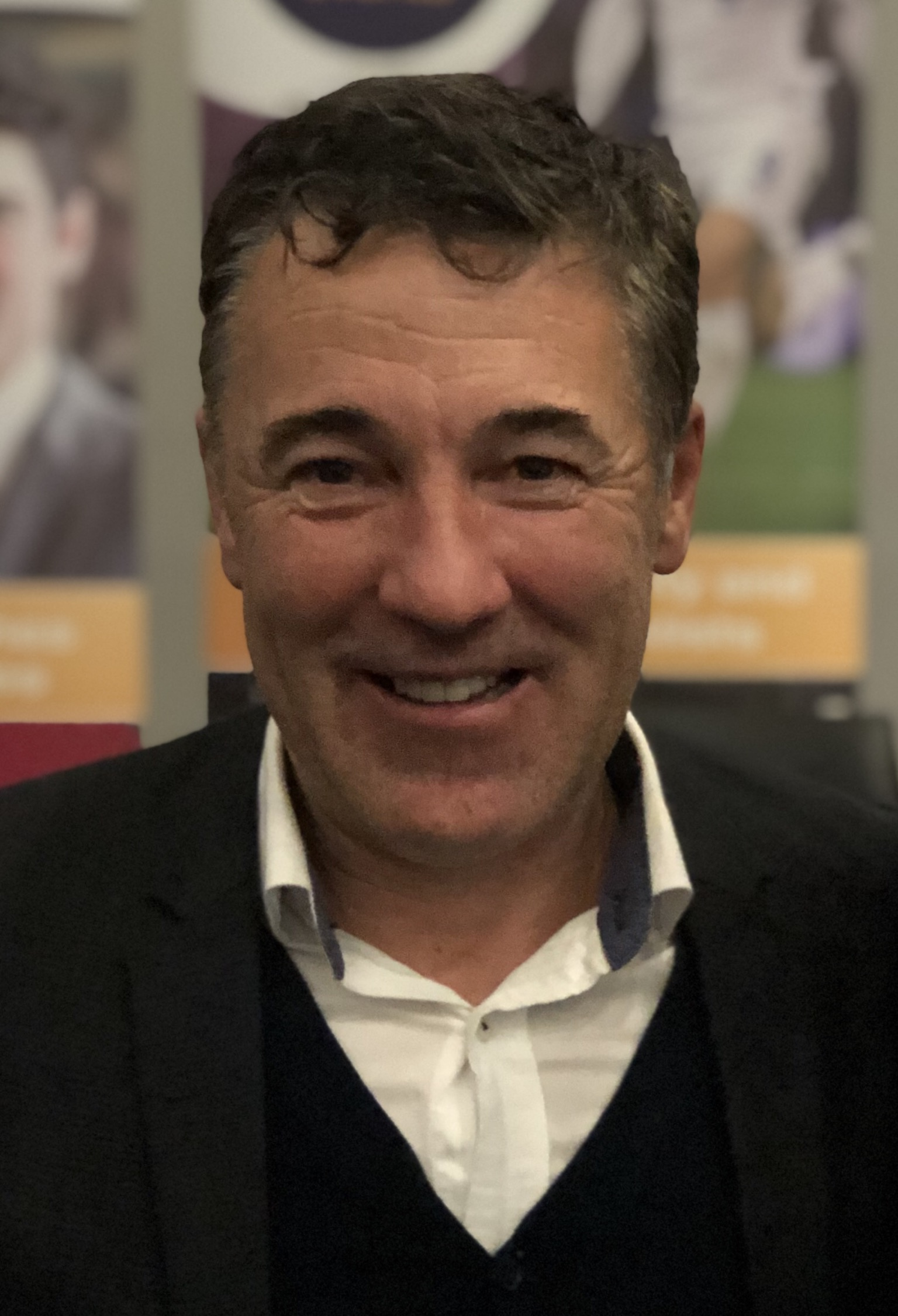
- Saunders in 2019

Personal information
- Full name: Dean Nicholas Saunders
- Date of birth: 21 June 1964 (age 62)
- Place of birth: Swansea, Wales
- Height: 5 ft 8 in (1.73 m)
- Position: Striker

Youth career
- 1980–1982: Swansea City

Senior career*
Years	Team	Apps	(Gls)
1982–1985	Swansea City	49	(12)
1985	→ Cardiff City (loan)	4	(0)
1985–1987	Brighton & Hove Albion	72	(21)
1987–1988	Oxford United	59	(22)
1988–1991	Derby County	106	(42)
1991–1992	Liverpool	42	(11)
1992–1995	Aston Villa	112	(37)
1995–1996	Galatasaray	27	(15)
1996–1997	Nottingham Forest	43	(5)
1997–1998	Sheffield United	43	(17)
1998–1999	Benfica	17	(5)
1999–2001	Bradford City	44	(3)
Total		618	(190)

International career
1986–2001	Wales	75	(22)

Managerial career
- 2008–2011: Wrexham
- 2011–2013: Doncaster Rovers
- 2013: Wolverhampton Wanderers
- 2014–2015: Crawley Town
- 2015: Chesterfield
- * Club domestic league appearances and goals

Dean Nicholas Saunders (born 21 June 1964) is a Welsh football manager and former professional footballer.

As a player, he was a striker and centre back in a career which lasted from 1982 until 2001. He played for Liverpool and Aston Villa in the 1990s, and set a new British transfer record when he joined the former from Derby County and was Aston Villa's record signing. He began at his home club Swansea City before also playing for Brighton, Oxford United, Bradford City, Nottingham Forest and Sheffield United as well as spells at Galatasaray and Benfica. He was capped 75 times at senior level for Wales between 1986 and 2001, scoring 22 times, making him one of the nation's highest-scoring and most-capped players of all time, although Wales never qualified for any major international competitions while Saunders was playing for them.

Following his retirement from playing in 2001, he entered football coaching and then management, firstly of Wrexham and since then of Doncaster Rovers, Wolverhampton Wanderers, Crawley Town and Chesterfield.

== Playing career ==
=== Early career ===
Saunders was born in Swansea and began his career with Swansea City, where his father Roy had been a player and coach, signing as an apprentice on leaving school in 1980.

He turned professional in the summer of 1982, after Swansea had finished sixth in their debut season as a First Division club. Swansea were relegated in 1982–83, and Saunders made his debut in the 1983–84 season. A goalless four-game loan spell at local rivals Cardiff City also came in 1984–85, before he signed for Second Division club Brighton & Hove Albion on a free transfer on 7 August 1985.

=== Brighton and Oxford ===
The striker was a success at the Goldstone Ground, scoring 14 league goals in his first season. He scored six goals from 30 league games in 1986–87 before a £60,000 move took him to the First Division with Oxford United. He was an instant success as his six goals in the final 12 league games secured First Division survival.

He scored 12 goals in 37 games during the 1987–88 season (during which Michael Cleverly was dismissed as manager and replaced by Mark Lawrenson) but it was not enough to prevent Oxford from going down in bottom place after three seasons in the top flight.

He began the 1988–89 season still in the Second Division, with manager Lawrenson and chairman Kevin Maxwell agreeing that they would only sell Saunders if Oxford failed to win promotion at the end of the season. However, he was sold to Derby County for £1 million on 28 October 1988, prompting Lawrenson to resign in protest over Saunders' sale.

=== Derby County ===
Saunders made his Derby County debut on 29 October 1988 against Wimbledon in a First Division fixture at the Baseball Ground in which he scored twice. In his first season at his new club he scored 14 goals in 30 games to help Derby finish fifth in the 1988–89 First Division table – their highest finish since they finished fourth in 1976 – but they were unable to compete in the UEFA Cup due to the ban on English teams in European competition following the Heysel Disaster of 1985. He added 11 league goals to his name in the 1989–90, but Derby slumped to 16th place.

During the 1990–91 season he netted 17 league goals but Derby still went down in bottom place with just five league wins all season. Their relegation made a transfer for Saunders inevitable, and Everton were favourites to sign him, and there were also approaches from Aston Villa's new manager Ron Atkinson, and Nottingham Forest's Brian Clough. Saunders ended up at Liverpool, who paid a then English record fee of £2.9 million for Saunders on 19 July 1991 to make him Ian Rush's new strike-partner as he revamped the Anfield squad, with strikers David Speedie and Peter Beardsley both being sold that summer.

=== Liverpool ===
In 1991–92, Saunders partnered Rush – who was also his strike partner for Wales – in attack, backed by young Steve McManaman which saw the club win the FA Cup for the fifth time in its history in manager Graeme Souness' first full season in charge.

Saunders scored 23 goals in all competitions, though just 10 of these were the league where the club only managed a sixth-place finish – one of their lowest positions since their current top flight tenure began in 1962. He became the first Liverpool player to score four goals in a European fixture when he did so during a 6–1 home win over Kuusysi Lahti in the UEFA Cup first round first leg on 18 September 1991 that was their first European fixture after their six-year ban. He also scored twice against FC Tirol in the third round first leg and a hat-trick in the return game.

Saunders finished as the club's top scorer for the 1991–92 season.

=== Aston Villa ===
On 10 September 1992, Saunders became Aston Villa's record signing in a £2.5 million deal that reunited him with former Liverpool players Steve Staunton and Ray Houghton at Villa Park. He managed six goals in his first four league games including two on his home debut against the club who had sold him; he also scored the winning goal at Anfield later in the season.

Here, he developed a strong partnership with Dalian Atkinson until the latter suffered an injury midway through the season. Linking up with Dwight Yorke, Saunders continued scoring as Villa challenged for the inaugural Premier League title but the team ultimately finished runners-up behind Manchester United. He ended the campaign with 16 goals in total with 12 in the league, one being a 35-yard strike against Ipswich.

Saunders and Villa found goals harder to come by in the league in the following season and he only managed 10, three coming from hat-trick scored against Swindon. He did however manage six more in cup competitions, with his goals against Birmingham City and Tranmere helping Aston Villa reach the 1994 League Cup Final where they beat Manchester United 3–1, as Saunders scored twice to end Villa's 12-year wait for a major trophy.

Despite his best goalscoring season for the club with 17 goals, the 1994–95 season saw Villa finish only one place short of relegation – two years after they had come one place short of the league title. At one stage during the campaign Saunders recorded a run of seven goals in six games, including braces against Wimbledon in a 7–1 victory, and Sheffield Wednesday. His final Villa goal came against Leicester City and despite not scoring in his final twelve appearances for the club he was named the Supporters' Player of the Year.

=== Galatasaray ===
Saunders was sold to Turkish club Galatasaray on 1 July 1995 for £2.35 million, where he reunited with his former Liverpool manager Graeme Souness. In fact, according to Shelley Webb's book Footballers' Wives Tell Their Tales, the first Saunders' wife Helen knew of the move was when she went to Turkey with him one weekend, to find that by Monday he had signed for the Istanbul club and this was her new home.

In the 1996 Turkish Cup final, Saunders scored the only goal of the first-leg before scoring an equalising goal in extra-time of the away leg against rivals Fenerbahçe to win the cup for Gala.

=== Later career ===
Saunders spent one season at Galatasaray, before he returned to the Premier League with Nottingham Forest in 1996 for £1.5m. His only season at the City Ground was a disappointment with a shortage of goals which contributed to Forest's relegation before joining Sheffield United in Division One. Whilst at Sheffield United he is remembered for an ingenious passage of play which resulted in a cheeky goal for his team. In a game against Port Vale, Saunders chased a long ball down with Vale keeper Paul Musselwhite, Musselwhite won the race and knocked the ball out for a throw in, only for Saunders to quickly pick it up, throw it onto the keeper's backside, and then proceed to curl the rebound into the goal from 25 yards.

Saunders remained at Sheffield United for two years before another spell abroad with Benfica (again under Souness) before moving back to the Premier League with newly promoted Bradford City. He remained at Bradford for two years until the end of the 2000–01 season, when Bradford were relegated from the Premier League. It was the eighth time in his career that Saunders had been involved with a club during a season of relegation.

== International career ==
Saunders was one of the Wales national team's most prolific goalscorers. He made his international debut, aged 21 in a 1–0 friendly win against the Republic of Ireland in Dublin on 26 March 1986 coming on as a 60th minute substitute for Gordon Davies. The match was also notable for being Jack Charlton's first match in charge of the Republic of Ireland and Neville Southall breaking his ankle on a routine cross. He scored 22 international goals, putting him fourth on the all time Wales list behind Ian Rush, Ivor Allchurch and Trevor Ford. Among his list of goals was the only goal of the game to defeat Brazil in Cardiff in 1991. He won the last of his 75 caps as a substitute in a World Cup qualifier against Ukraine on 28 March 2001, a few months short of his 37th birthday.

== Coaching career ==
After his playing retirement Saunders initially became a coach at Blackburn Rovers working alongside his former manager Graeme Souness. He moved with Souness to Newcastle United in 2004, initially in the role of striker coach, and then later becoming first-team coach. When Souness was sacked on 2 February 2006 due to a run of poor results, his entire backroom team including Saunders were also replaced.

Saunders started the Certificate in Football Management course at the University of Warwick Business School in June 2007 and holds the UEFA Pro Licence coaching badge. In June 2007, he was appointed assistant manager to John Toshack for the Wales national football team, and remained in the role until Toshack's departure in September 2010.

== Managerial career ==
=== Wrexham ===
On 2 October 2008, Saunders was appointed as manager of Conference Premier club Wrexham, taking over from Brian Little to become the side's fourth manager in 22 months. He was allowed to combine the role with his position as assistant manager of Wales.

Saunders made several signings in the summer of 2010, and after an uncertain start, the team finished in the play-off positions. They failed to win promotion though, after Luton Town defeated them 5–1 on aggregate in the semi-finals. After the club received a takeover at the conclusion of the season after several years of financial instability, Saunders signed a new contract.

Despite his new deal Saunders remained at Wrexham for only ten matches of the following season, during which he led the team to second place, before he moved to Doncaster Rovers of the Championship.

=== Doncaster Rovers ===
On 23 September 2011, Saunders was named manager of Doncaster Rovers following their sacking of Sean O'Driscoll. His first match gave the club their first win of the season and their first in 20 games, when they beat Crystal Palace 1–0. Despite this opening victory a run of poor results saw a section of fans call for Saunders to be sacked as Doncaster remained at the bottom of the league.

His attempts to keep Doncaster in the Championship came to an end on 14 April 2012 as they were relegated following a 4–3 home defeat by Portsmouth at the Keepmoat Stadium, ending their four-year stay in the Championship. In the transfer window Saunders said " I'm going to try and bring the best to the club (Doncaster Rovers) and I'm targeting Championship quality".

On 14 July 2012 Saunders made a brief return to playing as he came off the bench to score in Doncaster's 4–2 friendly victory over Cleethorpes Town.

Following their relegation to League One Saunders oversaw a promotion challenge which put the club joint top of the division by early January, but on 6 January 2013 Doncaster gave Championship club Wolverhampton Wanderers permission to talk to Saunders with the prospect of him becoming the club's new manager.

=== Wolverhampton Wanderers ===
On 7 January 2013 Saunders was confirmed as the new Wolves manager on a one-year rolling contract, succeeding Ståle Solbakken less than 48 hours after his dismissal, with both his assistant manager Brian Carey and fitness coach Mal Purchase at Doncaster also making the move to Molineux. Saunders' first match brought a 1–1 draw against Blackburn Rovers on 11 January 2013.

Despite announcing that he believed the team could still challenge for promotion, it was not until his tenth game in charge that Wolves recorded a victory. By the final months the team firmly lay in a relegation battle that ultimately proved unsuccessful, with their first relegation to the third tier since 1984–85 being confirmed on the final day of the season with defeat at Brighton.

Saunders stated that he hoped to remain in the job and "sort the club out from top to bottom", but his contract (as well as his assistant's) was terminated three days after relegation was confirmed, following only four months in the job.

=== Crawley Town ===
On 27 December 2014, Saunders was named as interim manager of League One club Crawley Town after John Gregory stepped down due to health problems. Crawley were 4th from bottom at the time of Saunders' appointment and were without a win in ten matches. A run of four wins in six games up to Easter lifted Crawley out the relegation places, and the club were sixth from bottom with two matches remaining following a 2–0 win at home to relegation rivals Notts County. Despite this, the club were relegated to League Two after defeat in their final two matches.

=== Chesterfield ===
On 13 May 2015, Saunders was appointed the manager of Chesterfield on a two-year contract following Paul Cook's departure for Portsmouth.

His first game in charge bought a 3–1 win at home against Barnsley and other notable results included a 2–1 win at then leaders Walsall in October, a 2–0 win at promotion chasers Millwall and a 4–1 win at FC United of Manchester in the FA Cup.

However, after four consecutive league defeats and dramatic drop in the form and style of play, Chesterfield announced on 28 November 2015 that they had parted company with Saunders following a 4–0 home defeat to Swindon Town, that left them in 16th place.

== Personal life ==
Saunders lives in Cheshire, where his closest neighbour was Gary Speed, his former international teammate. Following Speed's death, Saunders described himself as 'flabbergasted' upon hearing the news.

Saunders' son Callum is a semi-professional footballer. In 2018 Callum Saunders signed a professional contract with Nantwich Town.

In August 2019, Saunders was jailed for 10 weeks, but freed after one day pending an appeal, for refusing to provide a roadside breath test, following reports that he had been driving erratically. The sentence was overturned on appeal, and replaced with a suspended sentence and community work.

== Career statistics ==
=== International ===
Appearances and goals by national team and year
National team	Year	Apps	Goals
Wales	1986	4	2
Wales	1987	1	0
Wales	1988	6	2
Wales	1989	6	0
Wales	1990	5	4
Wales	1991	7	2
Wales	1992	8	1
Wales	1993	6	3
Wales	1994	3	0
Wales	1995	5	2
Wales	1996	5	4
Wales	1997	5	1
Wales	1998	5	0
Wales	1999	5	1
Wales	2000	2	0
Wales	2001	2	0
Total		75	22

Scores and results list Wales' goal tally first, score column indicates score after each Saunders goal.

List of international goals scored by Dean Saunders
No.	Date	Venue	Opponent	Score	Result	Competition	Ref.
1	19 May 1986	BC Place, Vancouver, Canada	Canada	1–0	3–0	Friendly	
2	19 May 1986	BC Place, Vancouver, Canada	Canada	2–0	3–0	Friendly	
3	23 March 1988	Vetch Field, Swansea, Wales	Yugoslavia	1–0	1–2	Friendly	
4	19 October 1988	Vetch Field, Swansea, Wales	Finland	1–1	2–2	1990 FIFA World Cup qualification	
5	25 April 1990	Råsunda Stadium, Stockholm, Sweden	Sweden	1–0	2–4	Friendly	
6	25 April 1990	Råsunda Stadium, Stockholm, Sweden	Sweden	2–3	2–4	Friendly	
7	20 May 1990	Ninian Park, Cardiff, Wales	Costa Rica	1–0	1–0	Friendly	
8	17 October 1990	Cardiff Arms Park, Cardiff, Wales	Belgium	2–1	3–1	UEFA Euro 1992 qualifying	
9	27 March 1991	Constant Vanden Stock Stadium, Anderlecht, Belgium	Belgium	1–1	1–1	UEFA Euro 1992 qualifying	
10	11 September 1991	Cardiff Arms Park, Cardiff, Wales	Brazil	1–0	1–0	Friendly	
11	9 September 1992	Ninian Park, Cardiff, Wales	Faroe Islands	2–0	6–0	1994 FIFA World Cup qualification	
12	6 June 1993	Svangaskarð, Toftir, Faroe Islands	Faroe Islands	1–0	3–0	1994 FIFA World Cup qualification	
13	13 October 1993	Cardiff Arms Park, Cardiff, Wales	Cyprus	1–0	2–0	1994 FIFA World Cup qualification	
14	17 November 1993	Cardiff Arms Park, Cardiff, Wales	Romania	1–1	1–2	1994 FIFA World Cup qualification	
15	29 March 1995	Vasil Levski National Stadium, Sofia, Bulgaria	Bulgaria	1–3	1–3	UEFA Euro 1996 qualifying	
16	26 April 1995	Rheinstadion, Düsseldorf, Germany	Germany	1–0	1–1	UEFA Euro 1996 qualifying	
17	31 August 1996	Cardiff Arms Park, Cardiff, Wales	San Marino	1–0	6–0	1998 FIFA World Cup qualification	
18	31 August 1996	Cardiff Arms Park, Cardiff, Wales	San Marino	6–0	6–0	1998 FIFA World Cup qualification	
19	5 October 1996	Cardiff Arms Park, Cardiff, Wales	Netherlands	1–0	1–3	1998 FIFA World Cup qualification	
20	9 November 1996	Philips Stadion, Eindhoven, Netherlands	Netherlands	1–3	1–7	1998 FIFA World Cup qualification	
21	20 August 1997	Ali Sami Yen Stadium, Istanbul, Turkey	Turkey	3–2	4–6	1998 FIFA World Cup qualification	
22	4 September 1999	Dinamo Stadium, Minsk, Belarus	Belarus	1–1	2–1	UEFA Euro 2000 qualifying	

=== Managerial ===
As of 28 November 2015

Team	From	To	Record				
Team	From	To	G	W	D	L	Win %
Wrexham	2 October 2008	22 September 2011	155	64	44	47	41.29
Doncaster Rovers	23 September 2011	7 January 2013	73	26	18	29	35.62
Wolverhampton Wanderers	7 January 2013	7 May 2013	20	5	5	10	25.00
Crawley Town	27 December 2014	12 May 2015	24	8	4	12	33.33
Chesterfield	13 May 2015	28 November 2015	23	8	2	13	34.78
Total			295	111	73	111	37.63

== Honours ==
Liverpool

- FA Cup: 1991–92

Aston Villa

- Football League Cup: 1993–94

Galatasaray

- Turkish Cup: 1995–96
