= David Burrows (footballer) =

English footballer

Personal information
- Date of birth: 25 October 1968 (age 58)
- Place of birth: Dudley, England
- Height: 5 ft 10 in (1.78 m)
- Position: Left-back

Senior career*
Years	Team	Apps	(Gls)
1985–1988	West Bromwich Albion	46	(1)
1988–1993	Liverpool	146	(3)
1993–1994	West Ham United	29	(1)
1994–1995	Everton	19	(0)
1995–2000	Coventry City	111	(0)
2000–2002	Birmingham City	25	(0)
2002–2003	Sheffield Wednesday	21	(0)
Total		397	(5)

International career
1989–1990	England U21	7	(0)
1990–1991	England B	3	(0)
- * Club domestic league appearances and goals

David Burrows (born 25 October 1968) is an English former professional footballer who played as a left-back.

As a player he notably played in the Premier League for Liverpool, West Ham United, Everton and Coventry City. Whilst a Liverpool player he won the Football League, the FA Cup and twice won the Charity Shield and he played his part in the earlier stages of Everton's successful FA Cup campaign in 1995. He also played in the Football League for West Bromwich Albion, Birmingham City and Sheffield Wednesday as well as the England Under-21 and B teams.

== Playing career ==
Burrows completed an apprenticeship at West Bromwich Albion and signed professional forms with the club as a 17-year-old in 1985, after a period in the Tipton Town youth team. He spent three years at The Hawthorns, playing 46 times and scoring one goal. He was signed by Liverpool for £550,000 in October 1988, making his debut two days later in a 0–0 draw against Coventry City at Anfield. Vying for a place with Steve Staunton meant that Burrows' first team opportunities were limited in his first season at Liverpool.

Burrows, an England under-21 international, joined his teammates in mourning for the 96 fans who lost their lives at the Hillsborough disaster in April 1989. He along with the rest of Liverpool Football Club were commended for the way they conducted themselves after the disaster and he attended numerous funerals and comforted the victims' families and friends. At this time he was not regularly featuring in the team, with the equally inexperienced Steve Staunton enjoying an extended run at left back which lasted through to the end of the season, including the 3–2 FA Cup final victory over Everton in which Barry Venison was selected for a place on the substitute's bench ahead of Burrows.

The following year, with Staunton more frequently deployed in midfield and manager Dalglish prepared to rotate his squad more, Burrows played more regularly and won his first honour with Liverpool when they clinched the League title, finishing nine points clear of Aston Villa. When Dalglish quit in 1991 and was replaced by Graeme Souness, Burrows found his chances more restricted, though he did score his first Liverpool goal on 31 August 1991 in a 3–1 victory over Everton at Anfield. Later that season he was picked by Souness for the 1992 FA Cup final, which Liverpool won, beating Sunderland 2–0 at Wembley.

Burrows left for West Ham United in September 1993, along with Mike Marsh, as part of a deal that took Julian Dicks to Anfield. Burrows had appeared 193 times for the Reds, scoring three goals. He made his West Ham debut in September 1993, just a day after joining them, in a 2–0 league win over Blackburn Rovers at Ewood Park. He spent just a single year at Upton Park, appearing 35 times scoring twice; in his second West Ham game in a 5–1 League Cup win against Chesterfield and in a 3–1 home win against Manchester City. Although he started the 1994–95 season, he played only four games before moving to Everton as part of a deal which saw the return of Tony Cottee to West Ham. Burrows joined Everton in September 1994, featuring in the early stages of Everton's glorious 1994–95 FA Cup campaign, starting the third and fourth round ties against Derby County and Bristol City respectively.

Burrows spent just six months at Everton, playing 23 times, before he was on the move again, this time to Ron Atkinson's Coventry City, in March 1995, or a fee of £1.1 million. Atkinson said at the time he knew of "no better English left-back". "If he plays to his best form, there's no reason why he shouldn't make the squad for the European Championships." He again made a quick début, appearing two days after signing in a 0–0 league draw with Southampton at the Dell. He suffered frequent injury during his four years at Highfield Road, but still made 130 appearances.

In 2000, failing to regain his place in the City line-up after returning from injury and unable to agree a new deal with the club, he moved again to Coventry's Midland rivals Birmingham City, in June 2000, on a free transfer. He made his debut in September 2000 in a 1–0 league victory over Sheffield United at St Andrew's. He helped Birmingham reach the 2001 Football League Cup Final. Burrows was left out of the match-day squad for the final against former club Liverpool, but he was on the pitch as a substitute as they beat Ipswich Town in the semi-finals. He spent less than two years at Birmingham, playing 30 matches. Burrows' time at Birmingham was marred with disagreements with managers Trevor Francis and Steve Bruce. A training ground incident in February 2002 involving Bruce and Burrows resulted in him being thrown out of the club.

In March 2002, Sheffield Wednesday signed Burrows on a free transfer and yet again he made a quick début, this time the following day, in a 0–0 league draw against Gillingham at Hillsborough. Injuries once again dogged Burrows as he injured both his collarbone and hamstring whilst at Sheffield Wednesday, forcing him to quit the professional game in May 2003.

== Personal life ==
After retirement he moved to France with his family where he got involved with the local football community, playing and coaching several local football teams, notably FC Sarlat Marcillac where he led the team to victory in the "Coupe de Dordogne". He now spends time maintaining his holiday rental properties in the area.

== Honours ==
Liverpool

- Football League First Division: 1989–90
- FA Cup: 1991–92
- FA Charity Shield: 1989, 1990
