= Mike Marsh (footballer) =

English footballer (born 1969)

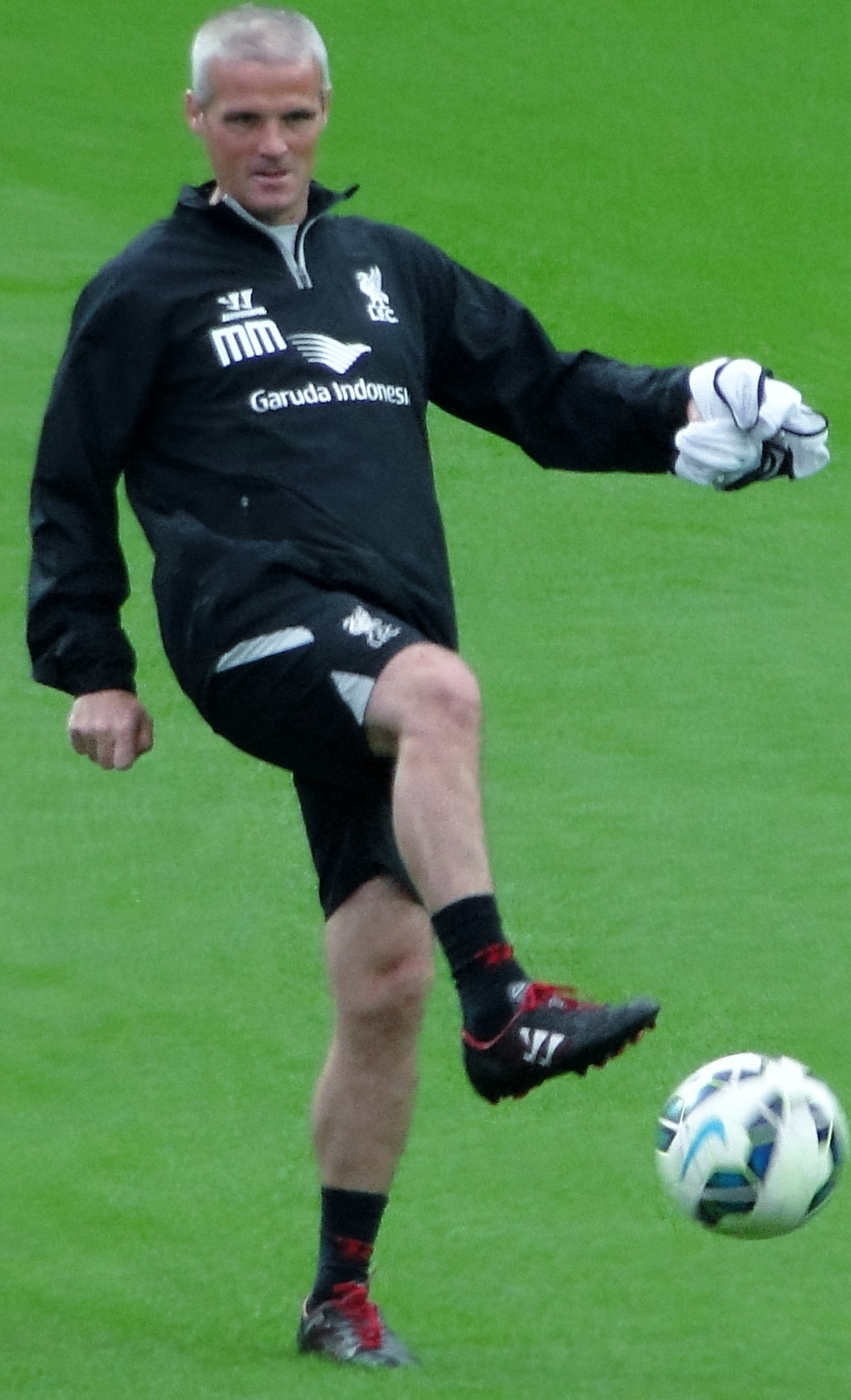
- Marsh as a coach with Liverpool in 2014

Personal information
- Full name: Michael Andrew Marsh
- Date of birth: 21 July 1969 (age 57)
- Place of birth: Liverpool, England
- Position: Midfielder

Team information
- Current team: Beşiktaş (Assistant Head Coach)

Youth career
- 1984–87: Kirkby Town

Senior career*
Years	Team	Apps	(Gls)
1987–1993	Liverpool	69	(2)
1993–1994	West Ham United	49	(1)
1994–1995	Coventry City	15	(2)
1995	Galatasaray	3	(0)
1995–1998	Southend United	84	(11)
1998	Southport		
1998–1999	Barrow		
1999–2000	Kidderminster Harriers	24	(4)
2000–2001	Southport	34	(7)
2001–2002	Boston United	7	(1)
2002–2003	Accrington Stanley		

Managerial career
- 2003: Burscough (manager)
- 2007–2008: Southport (assistant)
- 2008: Northwich Victoria (assistant)
- 2008: Bradford Park Avenue (caretaker)
- 2011–2012: Liverpool Reserves (assistant)
- 2012–2015: Liverpool (assistant)
- 2015–2016: Huddersfield Town (assistant)
- 2016–2019: England U-17 (assistant)
- 2019–2021: Swansea City (assistant)
- 2021–2024: Preston North End (assistant)
- 2025: Beşiktaş (assistant)
- * Club domestic league appearances and goals

Michael Andrew Marsh (born 21 July 1969) is an English football coach and former professional player who was lastly an assistant manager at Turkish club Beşiktaş.

Marsh came through the ranks at Liverpool and was part of their 1992 FA Cup-winning side. He notably played in the Premier League for The Reds as well as West Ham United and Coventry City before a spell in Turkey with Galatasaray. He went on to play in the Football League with Southend United and then in Non-League with Southport, Barrow, Kidderminster Harriers, Boston United and Accrington Stanley.

Marsh moved into management and had spells in charge of Burscough, Bradford Park Avenue and Northwich Victoria. He was a first-team coach at Liverpool between 2011 and 2015, working under Kenny Dalglish and Brendan Rodgers, before joining Huddersfield Town as a coach in November 2015. He left in May 2016 to take up a coaching role with the England under-17s, and was an assistant coach at Swansea City between 2019 and 2021.

== Playing career ==
=== Liverpool ===
A midfielder or full-back, he was spotted playing for his local side Kirkby Town by Liverpool reserve team coach Phil Thompson, who advised manager Kenny Dalglish to sign the talented youngster, which he did on 21 August 1987. Marsh made his Liverpool debut on 1 March 1989 in the 2–0 win over Charlton Athletic at Anfield, when he came on as a 58th-minute substitute for Jan Mølby.

Marsh graduated from the reserves and established himself as a first-team regular in the 1991–92 season. His first goal also came during this season, in one of the most memorable matches ever played at Anfield, on 6 November 1991 in a UEFA Cup second round second leg tie against Auxerre. The game saw Liverpool turn a 2–0 deficit from the first leg in France into a 3–2 aggregate win. Marsh's 29th-minute equaliser swung the game in Liverpool's favour.

Marsh was an unused substitute in the 1992 FA Cup Final and picked up a winners medal as Liverpool beat Sunderland 2–0. He continued to be a regular squad member in 1992–93 and began the 1993–94 season in style with a great curled goal in a 5–0 win at Swindon Town, but Graeme Souness allowed him to leave within days of that goal when he joined West Ham United as a makeweight (along with David Burrows) in the deal that took Julian Dicks to Anfield. Marsh had appeared 101 times for Liverpool and scored six goals.

=== West Ham United ===
Marsh signed for West Ham United on 17 September 1993 and made his debut the following day in the 2–0 win over Blackburn Rovers at Ewood Park. Marsh's time at Upton Park was short-lived. He spent fifteen months at the club, during which he made 61 appearances, scoring twice.

=== Coventry City ===
Coventry City signed Marsh for £450,000 on 30 December 1994 but he was soon on the move again after nineteen games and two goals in six months at Highfield Road.

=== Galatasaray ===
It was the manager who had allowed him to leave Liverpool, Graeme Souness, who wanted Marsh's signature. He got it for £500,000 on 26 June 1995, taking Marsh to Turkish side Galatasaray. Marsh played three times in two and a half months for the team from Istanbul before he was on the move yet again to Southend United, whose newly installed manager was Marsh's ex-Liverpool teammate Ronnie Whelan.

=== Southend United ===
Marsh signed for the Shrimpers on 3 September 1995 for £500,000. Marsh made his debut on 9 September 1995 in the 1–0 defeat to Sunderland at Roker Park. Marsh had two good seasons at the Essex club, appearing in seventy-five league games and scoring ten times. The second of these seasons saw Southend relegated to the Second Division, the third tier of English football. Things got worse for Marsh as he picked up a knee injury which ultimately and prematurely ended his professional career. He had played ninety seven times for Southend, scoring thirteen goals.

=== Barrow and Kidderminster Harriers ===
As part of the insurance payout Marsh received when he retired, he was required to never play league football again, so he spent the remainder of his playing career in non-league. The first non-league side he signed for was Barrow, where he stayed for six months before moving to the ambitious Midlands club Kidderminster Harriers on 19 November 1999. Kidderminster were managed by former Liverpool teammate, and the man Marsh had replaced when making his debut, Jan Mølby.

The Harriers were in the Conference looking to gain league status for the first time in the club's history. They achieved their dream by the end of Marsh's first season for the club, but due to the terms of the insurance claim, Marsh could not follow Mølby and his teammates into league football and had to leave after 24 league appearances, in which he hit the net four times.

=== Southport ===
Marsh joined Conference side Southport on a free transfer on 18 May 2000 and spent just over a year there, playing 37 times and scoring seven times.

=== Boston United ===
On 9 June 2001, Marsh joined another ambitious Conference outfit, this time Boston United, who paid Southport £15,000. Marsh's experience helped guide Boston to the Conference title, but once again he had to leave as he was not allowed to join his Boston teammates in league football. He played seven times for Boston, scoring once against Chester, but was a major influence within the Boston camp.

=== Accrington Stanley ===
Marsh's last move was to another ambitious club, Accrington Stanley. Accrington won the Northern Premier League that season, thus gaining promotion to the Conference. Marsh ended his career after one season at the Crown Ground on 2 June 2003.

== Coaching career ==
After retiring from playing, Marsh was on the coaching staff of Southport. In 2008, Northwich Victoria appointed him as their first-team coach. He quit Northwich to become assistant manager at Bradford Park Avenue in November 2008. Later that month, he was appointed caretaker manager of Park Avenue after Dave Cameron resigned following a defeat against bottom-placed Witton Albion, he shared the role with goalkeeping coach Gary Stokes because he had commitments in Spain.

Marsh was the head academy coach of Accrington & Rossendale College in East Lancashire. Marsh combined this role with his academy coaching job at Liverpool's under-16's and with his Master's football commitments. In May 2011, Liverpool announced that he was to move up to coaching the under-18 side. Marsh moved up to first-team coach at Liverpool before his departure from the club was announced in June 2015.

On 9 November 2015, Marsh joined Huddersfield Town as a coach under new manager David Wagner.

In March 2016, it was announced that Marsh would leave Huddersfield to take up a similar position with the England under-17's.

On 13 June 2019, Marsh was named assistant first-team coach to Steve Cooper at Swansea City.

In December 2021, he returned to his North West roots to become the new first team coach to Ryan Lowe at Preston North End. Following Lowe's departure, in August 2024, Marsh was placed on interim charge of Preston. After a 3–0 away defeat by Swansea City on 17 August, Marsh announced that he did not wish to be considered for the post of manager on a full-time basis and left the club with immediate effect.

== Honours ==
Liverpool

- FA Cup: 1991–92

Kidderminster Harriers

- Football Conference: 1999–2000

Boston United

- Football Conference: 2001–02

Accrington Stanley

- Northern Premier League: 2002–03
