= Barry Jones (footballer) =

English footballer

Personal information
- Full name: Barry Jones
- Date of birth: 30 June 1970 (age 56)
- Place of birth: Prescot, England
- Height: 6 ft 0 in (1.83 m)
- Position: Defender

Senior career*
Years	Team	Apps	(Gls)
?–1989	Prescot Cables	?	(?)
1989–1992	Liverpool	0	(0)
1992–1998	Wrexham	195	(5)
1997–1998	→ York City (loan)	5	(0)
1998–2001	York City	129	(5)
2001–2004	Southport	113	(4)
2004–2005	Runcorn F.C. Halton	?	(?)
2005–2006	Prescot Cables	?	(?)
2006	Bangor City	2	(0)
Total		444	(14)
- * Club domestic league appearances and goals

Barry Jones (born 30 June 1970) is an English former footballer. He is a defender who played over 300 Football League games for Wrexham and York City, having begun his professional career with Liverpool. At Liverpool he made one first team appearance; coming on as a substitute in a UEFA Cup tie against Kuusysi Lahti in October 1991. He played 36 games and scored two goals for Southport in the Northern Premier League in the 2003–04 season. He made two appearances for Bangor City after signing in August 2006.
