= Liverpool 9–0 Crystal Palace (1989) =

- Event: 1989–90 First Division
| Liverpool | Crystal Palace |
| 9 | 0 |
- Date: 12 September 1989
- Venue: Anfield, Liverpool
- Referee: Keren Barratt (Coventry)
- Attendance: 35,779

On 12 September 1989, Liverpool faced Crystal Palace in a First Division fixture at Anfield, during the 1989–90 season. Crystal Palace were newly promoted to the division, while Liverpool had been narrowly pipped to the League title by Arsenal in the previous season. Liverpool won the match 9–0, recording their biggest ever top-flight win, and inflicting Palace's heaviest ever defeat. Eight different players scored for Liverpool, the first time this has happened for the same club in English football history.

== Build-up ==
Liverpool began the season in mixed form, winning the Charity Shield against Arsenal then earning a win and two draws from their opening three matches. A deal to sell striker John Aldridge to Spanish club Real Sociedad for £1.25 million had been agreed on 1 September; he would leave the day after this match, his last for the club.

Newly promoted Crystal Palace lost on the opening day at Queens Park Rangers and at home to Coventry City in their third match. Sandwiched between had been a credible point at home to Manchester United, with a late Ian Wright equaliser cancelling out Bryan Robson's first-half goal.

The match was originally due to be part of the fourth round of the season's matches, to be played in the second midweek slot. However, the game was delayed by a fortnight as Liverpool had a high-profile friendly against Real Madrid in the annual invitational Trofeo Santiago Bernabéu match, and the following week England played Sweden in a World Cup qualifying match. In the meantime, Crystal Palace won their fourth game of the season at home to Wimbledon and Liverpool comfortably beat Derby County 3–0 at the Baseball Ground.

At the time of kick-off, Millwall were top of the league, something described in The Times match report as an "incongruous sight".

== Match ==
=== Summary ===
Liverpool opened the scoring in the 7th minute – John Barnes dribbled towards the Crystal Palace area, but found himself blocked before Ronnie Whelan played a pass out to the right, from where Steve Nicol finished coolly. The second goal came from Steve McMahon, who advanced onto a through-ball, spotted keeper Perry Suckling off his line, and chipped the ball into the net from distance. The third goal came from interplay between Barnes, David Burrows and Peter Beardsley. Beardsley began a mazy dribble into the penalty area, and no sooner was he tackled than Ian Rush was on hand to convert from close range.

Liverpool went in at half-time 3–0 up, but there was more to come. In the 56th minute, a Beardsley corner was flicked on by Barnes, and headed home by Gary Gillespie. Beardsley himself made it 5, running onto a layoff from Rush, and slamming the ball past Suckling from the edge of the area. Liverpool won a penalty in the 66th minute, and by this time they could afford to make a sentimental decision. The crowd called for the introduction of John Aldridge, who was about to leave the club to join Real Sociedad; manager Kenny Dalglish obliged and replaced Beardsley with Aldridge. Aldridge converted the penalty with his first touch, to loud cheers. Palace were awarded a penalty of their own, but Geoff Thomas missed his chance to score a consolation, and not long afterwards it was 7–0, with Barnes scoring a curling, chipped free kick from the edge of the area. Barnes set up the eighth goal too, his corner being headed home by defender Glenn Hysén, scoring his first goal for the club. The scoring was rounded off in the last minute, Burrows cross from the left went behind Aldridge, only for Steve Nicol to side-foot it into the net, finishing the scoring just as he had started it.

=== Details ===
12 September 1989
19:30 BST

| Liverpool | 9–0 | Crystal Palace |
|---|---|---|
| Nicol 7', 90'; McMahon 15'; Rush 45'; Gillespie 56'; Beardsley 61'; Aldridge 67' (pen.); Barnes 79'; Hysén 82' | Report |

Anfield, Liverpool
Attendance: 35,779
Referee: Keren Barratt (Coventry)

| Liverpool | Crystal Palace |

| GK | 1 | (Zimbabwe) Bruce Grobbelaar |
| CB | 2 | (Sweden) Glenn Hysén |
| LB | 3 | (England) David Burrows |
| RM | 4 | (Scotland) Steve Nicol |
| CM | 5 | (Republic of Ireland) Ronnie Whelan |
| CB | 6 | (Scotland) Alan Hansen (c) |
| CF | 7 | (England) Peter Beardsley | (substituted off) 66' |
| RB | 8 | (Scotland) Gary Gillespie |
| CF | 9 | (Wales) Ian Rush |
| LM | 10 | (England) John Barnes |
| CM | 11 | (England) Steve McMahon | (substituted off) 79' |
Substitutes:
| FW | 12 | (Republic of Ireland) John Aldridge | (substituted on) 66' |
| MF | 14 | (Denmark) Jan Mølby | (substituted on) 79' |
Manager:
(Scotland) Kenny Dalglish

| GK | 1 | (England) Perry Suckling |
| RB | 2 | (England) John Pemberton |
| LB | 3 | (England) David Burke |
| CM | 4 | (England) Andy Gray |
| CB | 5 | (Wales) Jeff Hopkins |
| CB | 6 | (England) Gary O'Reilly |
| LM | 7 | (Republic of Ireland) Eddie McGoldrick |
| CM | 8 | (England) Geoff Thomas (c) |
| CF | 9 | (England) Mark Bright |
| CF | 10 | (England) Ian Wright |
| RM | 11 | (England) Alan Pardew |
Substitutes:
| DF | 12 | (England) Richard Shaw |
| MF | 14 | (England) Alex Dyer |
Manager:
(England) Steve Coppell

== Aftermath ==
The win saw Liverpool replace Millwall at the top of the First Division on goal difference. Aldridge bade his farewell to the fans at the final whistle, throwing his shirt and boots into the Kop.

Liverpool's form stuttered slightly after the game. Four days later they played Norwich City at Anfield but the match was an anticlimactic goalless draw with Peter Beardsley and Glenn Hysén each missing an open goal. The following Tuesday, Liverpool found themselves 2–1 down at home to Third Division strugglers Wigan Athletic in the League Cup. However, they fought back to win that match 5–2 and then won the Merseyside derby away to Everton 3–1 the following weekend.

Liverpool ended the season as Champions, their 18th league title. Palace survived relegation, finishing 15th, and were able to inflict revenge on Liverpool later in the season, beating them 4–3 in an FA Cup semi-final at Villa Park. They went on to lose the Final against Manchester United after a replay. Their goalkeeper Perry Suckling's career never quite recovered from conceding nine – he soon lost his place to new signing Nigel Martyn, and left the club in 1992, joining Watford (where he replaced a Liverpool-bound David James), before drifting into lower- and non-league football.

A similar hammering occurred between the two sides in December 2020 during the 2020–21 Premier League season, with Liverpool winning 7–0 at Selhurst Park to record their biggest ever away win in the top flight, and consigning Palace to their record home defeat.

On 27 August 2022, Liverpool would equal their record for biggest ever top-flight win when they recorded a 9–0 victory over AFC Bournemouth in the Premier League.
