= 1989–90 Liverpool F.C. season =

English football club season

Liverpool
1989–90 season
- Chairman: John Smith
- Manager: Kenny Dalglish
- First Division: Champions
- FA Cup: Semi-finals
- League Cup: Third round
- FA Charity Shield: Winners
- Top goalscorer: League: John Barnes (22); All: John Barnes (28)
- Highest home attendance: 38,730 (vs. Everton, League, 3 February)
- Lowest home attendance: 19,231 (vs. Wigan Athletic, League Cup, 19 September)
- Average home league attendance: 36,690
| Home colours | Away colours | Third colours |

The 1989–90 season was the 98th season in Liverpool F.C.'s existence, and their 28th consecutive year in the top flight. This article covers the period from 1 July 1989 to 30 June 1990.

Liverpool finished the season as league champions for the 18th time, and looked on course for another double, only to be knocked off course in the final stages of the FA Cup for the third season running – this time by a dramatic 4–3 semi-final defeat against a Crystal Palace side they had beaten 9–0 in the league earlier in the season. They did finish the season nine points ahead of runners-up Aston Villa in the league, but had faced a stiff challenge from Villa for much of the season and earlier in the season from neighbouring Everton. This would be Liverpool's last title for 30 years, until the 2019−20 season.

The autumn of 1989 saw the departure of striker John Aldridge to Spain. Aldridge had lost his place in the starting line-up to a resurgent Ian Rush, who had returned to the club a year earlier after an unhappy season in Italy. Injury-plagued defender Jim Beglin was transferred to Leeds United just before the start of the season, with the defence being bolstered by the arrival of Swedish star Glenn Hysén.

== Pre-season friendlies ==
Liverpool's entered the four-team Makita International Tournament, played at Wembley Stadium, where they lost against Arsenal in the final, having beaten Dinamo Kiev. This was followed by a tour of Scandinavia which saw wins against Malmö FF and Halmstads BK and draws with Vasalunds IF and HJK Helsinki.

== Regular season ==
=== August ===
As FA Cup holders, Liverpool entered the Charity Shield, facing league champions Arsenal, in a rematch of the last game of the previous season when Arsenal had won the title at Anfield in dramatic circumstances. Liverpool gained some small revenge with a 1–0 win, thanks to a Peter Beardsley goal. The league campaign began with a 3–1 win over Manchester City, followed by away draws against Luton Town and Aston Villa. The month ended with a trip to Spain with a friendly against Real Madrid for the Trofeo Santiago Bernabéu. The Reds lost 2–0.

The month ended with Liverpool fifth in the table, with newly promoted Chelsea top of the league, Millwall (in only their second top flight campaign) second, local rivals Everton third and Coventry City fourth.

=== September ===
September began with a third consecutive away game, this time a 3–0 win at Derby County, followed by a 9–0 hammering of Crystal Palace at Anfield. Eight different players scored in this game, which was also notable as John Aldridge's last game for the club. Aldridge, who was leaving to join Real Sociedad, came off the bench to convert a penalty, and threw his boots and kit into the Kop at the end of the game. Aldridge had remained a first-choice player in 1988–89 after Rush's return, either playing in a three-man attack alongside Rush and Beardsley or alongside Beardsley in a two-man attack in the 14 league games that Rush was unfit for, but for 1989–90 Dalglish had decided to stick with a two-man attack of Rush and Beardsley, and Aldridge knew that leaving Anfield would be his best chance of regular first team action.

After a 0–0 home draw with Norwich City, Wigan Athletic were defeated 5–2 in the League Cup, before the first Merseyside derby of the season. Just as in the previous season's FA Cup final, and in so many derbies before, Ian Rush was the match winner, as the Reds won 3–1 at Goodison Park.

=== October ===
First up in October were Wigan in the so-called "away" leg (played at Anfield because Wigan's pitch was unplayable) of the League Cup second round. Liverpool won 3–0, with substitute Steve Staunton scoring a hat-trick to secure an 8–2 aggregate victory. Back in the league, Wimbledon were beaten 2–1 at Plough Lane before Southampton dealt the Reds a 4–1 hammering at The Dell. The misery was to continue four days later, as Arsenal ended Liverpool's League Cup campaign with a 1–0 win at Highbury. The league campaign resumed with a 1–0 win over Tottenham Hotspur, which saw Liverpool reclaim their lead of the First Division from Everton, who seemed to be re-emerging as a top club after two slightly less successful seasons under the management of Colin Harvey, since Howard Kendall's departure. Chelsea and Arsenal were still giving the two Merseyside clubs a serious run for their money, while a surprise challenge was also starting to mount from Southampton, Norwich and Aston Villa. After a generally very disappointing September, Manchester United had started to improve and were just seven points (though 10 places) behind Liverpool. The challenge from Millwall and Coventry, however, appeared to have ended as both clubs were now some way down the table.

=== November ===
November was a miserable month for Liverpool. It began with a 1–0 home defeat against Coventry City, which was compounded by a 3–2 loss at QPR. Wins at Millwall and at home to Arsenal followed, before an away game at Sheffield Wednesday. This was Liverpool's first game at Hillsborough after the tragedy of seven months earlier, and it ended in a 2–0 defeat. However, they ended the month top of the league with 27 points – bracketed together on goal difference with Arsenal, Villa and Chelsea. Southampton and Coventry were both just four points behind the leading pack, but Everton's title hopes were fading fast as they had slumped from top place to 12th within a few short weeks. Manchester United's steady improvement had continued as they had continued to narrow the gap between themselves and Liverpool – now standing at nine places but just six points.

=== December ===
December was a better month for Liverpool, who began it with an impressive 4–1 win at Manchester City (now managed by former Everton boss Howard Kendall). A 1–1 home draw with Villa followed, before a superb 5–2 win over fellow title contenders Chelsea on 16 December. A goalless draw with Manchester United came at Anfield on 23 December, with Liverpool's great rivals now enduring another run of bad form and effectively out of the title race. The next two games – against Sheffield Wednesday and Charlton Athletic – were both won, and so Liverpool ended the 1980s as First Division leaders. They had a four-point lead over their nearest rivals Aston Villa and a four-point lead over Arsenal. The challenge from the likes of Southampton, Chelsea and Norwich was becoming more distant, though a threat from North London was emerging in the shape of a Tottenham Hotspur side spearheaded by two of England's finest players – Paul Gascoigne and Gary Lineker. The challenge from Everton was now looking well and truly over, as Colin Harvey's men were now 10th in the league and 13 points adrift of Liverpool, though with a game in hand. Any hopes that Manchester United might have had of beating Liverpool to the title were now almost completely dead, as Alex Ferguson's team now stood 15th in the league and were just two points above the relegation zone.

=== January ===
A new year and a new decade began with a 2–2 draw for Liverpool at Nottingham Forest on New Year's Day. Then came an FA Cup third round clash with Swansea City at Vetch Field. The Swans were now in the Third Division and the run for their money that they had given Liverpool eight years earlier was now very much a distant memory, but the Swans gave Liverpool a scare by holding them to a goalless draw. However, Liverpool blew Swansea to pieces in the replay at Anfield three days later by winning 8–0. Their FA Cup action (a fourth round clash with Norwich ending in a 3–1 replay win at Anfield after a goalless draw in the first game at Carrow Road) meant that there would be just two more league games that month – the first a 2–2 home draw with Luton, the second a 2–0 win over Crystal Palace at Selhurst Park. However, Liverpool remained top of the league – level on points with Aston Villa with Arsenal as the only other serious contenders, though Nottingham Forest had now climbed into fourth place and were starting to raise a few eyebrows among observers in the title race.

=== February ===
Liverpool remained on course for a unique second double as they beat Southampton 3–0 in the fifth round at Anfield on 17 February. Bad weather meant that there were just two league games for Liverpool that month, the first a 2–1 Merseyside derby win over Everton at Anfield, the second a goalless draw at Norwich.

=== March ===
Liverpool moved closer to a second double on 14 March when they beat QPR 1–0 in the quarter-final replay at Anfield, three days after drawing the first match 2–2 at Loftus Road. In the league, they defeated Millwall, Manchester United and Southampton but lost to Tottenham Hotspur. They were still top of the league, on goal difference ahead of Aston Villa and with a game in hand. Arsenal were now the only other team looking like a serious threat to the Reds, and, although Everton's recent revival had seen them climb to fifth place, it was now almost certainly too late for them to pip Liverpool to the league title.

22 March saw the arrival at Anfield of 26-year-old Israeli striker Ronny Rosenthal on loan from Belgian club Standard Liège.

=== April ===
April was a very mixed month for Liverpool. They finally clinched the league title on 28 April with two games to spare, thanks to a 2–1 home win over QPR, but 8 April saw their "double double" hopes ended in dramatic fashion for the third season running, this time in the shape of an FA Cup semi-final defeat to Crystal Palace (the team they had beaten 9–0 in the league seven months earlier) where the South Londoners had beaten them 4–3 in extra time to book a Wembley date with Manchester United in the final. Liverpool had now been champions of England on no fewer than 18 occasions – more than any other side at the time.

=== May ===
The Reds proved themselves as worthy champions by winning both of their final two games: a slender 1–0 home win over Derby followed by a 6–1 hammering of Coventry at Highfield Road on the final day of the season.

Ronny Rosenthal's loan deal became permanent at the end of the season when Liverpool paid Standard Liège £1 million for his services, which had already seen him net seven goals in just eight league games – including a hat-trick in the 4–0 away win over relegation-bound Charlton.

== Squad ==
Goalkeepers

- (Zimbabwe) Bruce Grobbelaar
- (England) Mike Hooper

Defenders

- (England) Gary Ablett
- (England) David Burrows
- (Scotland) Gary Gillespie
- (Scotland) Alan Hansen
- (Sweden) Glenn Hysén
- (Scotland) Steve Nicol
- (Republic of Ireland) Steve Staunton
- (England) Nick Tanner
- (England) Barry Venison
- (England) Alex Watson

Midfielders

- (England) John Barnes
- (Republic of Ireland) Ray Houghton
- (England) Steve McMahon
- (Northern Ireland) Jim Magilton
- (England) Mike Marsh
- (Denmark) Jan Mølby
- (England) Nigel Spackman
- (Republic of Ireland) Ronnie Whelan

Attackers

- (Republic of Ireland) John Aldridge
- (England) Peter Beardsley
- (Israel) Ronny Rosenthal
- (Wales) Ian Rush
- (Scotland) Kenny Dalglish

== Squad statistics ==
=== Appearances and goals ===
| No. | Pos | Nat | Player | Total | | Division 1 | | FA Cup | | Charity Shield | | League Cup | |
| No. | Pos | Nat | Player | Apps | Goals | Apps | Goals | Apps | Goals | Apps | Goals | Apps | Goals |
|---|---|---|---|---|---|---|---|---|---|---|---|---|---|
| | DF | (England) ENG | Gary Ablett | 16 | 0 | 13+2 | 0 | 0+0 | 0 | 0+0 | 0 | 1+0 | 0 |
| | FW | (Republic of Ireland) IRL | John Aldridge | 2 | 1 | 0+2 | 1 | 0+0 | 0 | 0+0 | 0 | 0+0 | 0 |
| | MF | (England) ENG | John Barnes | 45 | 28 | 34+0 | 22 | 8+0 | 5 | 1+0 | 0 | 2+0 | 1 |
| | FW | (England) ENG | Peter Beardsley | 41 | 16 | 27+2 | 10 | 8+0 | 4 | 1+0 | 1 | 2+1 | 1 |
| | DF | (England) ENG | David Burrows | 33 | 0 | 23+3 | 0 | 2+1 | 0 | 1+0 | 0 | 3+0 | 0 |
| | FW | (Scotland) SCO | Kenny Dalglish | 1 | 0 | 0+1 | 0 | 0+0 | 0 | 0+0 | 0 | 0+0 | 0 |
| | DF | (Scotland) SCO | Gary Gillespie | 16 | 4 | 11+2 | 4 | 1+1 | 0 | 0+0 | 0 | 1+0 | 0 |
| | GK | (Zimbabwe) ZIM | Bruce Grobbelaar | 50 | 0 | 38+0 | 0 | 8+0 | 0 | 1+0 | 0 | 3+0 | 0 |
| | DF | (Scotland) SCO | Alan Hansen | 42 | 0 | 31+0 | 0 | 8+0 | 0 | 1+0 | 0 | 2+0 | 0 |
| | MF | (Republic of Ireland) IRL | Ray Houghton | 25 | 1 | 16+3 | 1 | 3+1 | 0 | 0+0 | 0 | 2+0 | 0 |
| | DF | (Sweden) SWE | Glenn Hysén | 46 | 2 | 35+0 | 1 | 8+0 | 0 | 1+0 | 0 | 2+0 | 1 |
| | MF | (England) ENG | Mike Marsh | 2 | 0 | 0+2 | 0 | 0+0 | 0 | 0+0 | 0 | 0+0 | 0 |
| | MF | (England) ENG | Steve McMahon | 49 | 6 | 37+1 | 5 | 8+0 | 1 | 1+0 | 0 | 2+0 | 0 |
| | MF | (Denmark) DEN | Jan Mølby | 20 | 1 | 12+5 | 1 | 0+0 | 0 | 0+0 | 0 | 2+1 | 0 |
| | MF | (Scotland) SCO | Steve Nicol | 33 | 9 | 21+2 | 6 | 7+0 | 3 | 1+0 | 0 | 2+0 | 0 |
| | FW | (Israel) ISR | Ronny Rosenthal | 8 | 7 | 5+3 | 7 | 0+0 | 0 | 0+0 | 0 | 0+0 | 0 |
| | FW | (Wales) WAL | Ian Rush | 48 | 26 | 36+0 | 18 | 8+0 | 6 | 1+0 | 0 | 3+0 | 2 |
| | DF | (Republic of Ireland) IRL | Steve Staunton | 28 | 3 | 18+2 | 0 | 4+2 | 0 | 0+0 | 0 | 0+2 | 3 |
| | DF | (England) ENG | Nick Tanner | 4 | 0 | 2+2 | 0 | 0+0 | 0 | 0+0 | 0 | 0+0 | 0 |
| | DF | (England) ENG | Barry Venison | 37 | 0 | 25+0 | 0 | 7+1 | 0 | 1+0 | 0 | 2+1 | 0 |
| | DF | (England) ENG | Alex Watson | 1 | 0 | 0+0 | 0 | 0+0 | 0 | 0+0 | 0 | 1+0 | 0 |
| | MF | (Republic of Ireland) IRL | Ronnie Whelan | 46 | 2 | 34+0 | 1 | 8+0 | 1 | 1+0 | 0 | 3+0 | 0 |

== Transfers ==
=== In ===
| Pos | Player | From | Fee | Date |
|---|---|---|---|---|
| DF | (Sweden) Glenn Hysén | (Italy) Fiorentina | £600,000 | 1 June 1989 |
| DF | (England) Steve Harkness | (England) Carlisle United | £75,000 | 17 July 1989 |

=== Out ===
| Pos | Player | To | Fee | Date |
|---|---|---|---|---|
| DF | (Republic of Ireland) Jim Beglin | (England) Leeds United | Free | 06-1989 |
| FW | (Republic of Ireland) John Aldridge | (Spain) Real Sociedad | £1,250,000 | 13 September 1989 |

=== Loaned In ===
| Pos | Player | From | Start | End |
|---|---|---|---|---|
| FW | (Israel) Ronnie Rosenthal | (Belgium) Standard Liège | 22 March 1990 | 26 June 1990 |

== Pre-Season and friendlies ==
| 29 July 1989 Makita Tournament R1 | Dynamo Kyiv | 0–2 | Liverpool | London |
| | | Report | Barnes (pen.); Aldridge | Stadium: Wembley; Attendance: 20,374 |

| 30 July 1989 Makita Tournament Final | Arsenal | 1–0 | Liverpool | London |
| | Bould 13' | Report | | Stadium: Wembley; Attendance: 23,026; Referee: G. Courtney |

| 1 August 1989 Tour of Sweden | Malmö FF | 1–2 | Liverpool | Malmö |
| | Dahlin 79' | Report | Rush 18'; Hysén 64' | Stadium: Malmö Stadion; Attendance: 17,239 |

| 3 August 1989 Tour of Sweden | Vasalunds IF | 1–1 | Liverpool | Stockholm |
| | Ivey 38' | Report | Aldridge 13' | Stadium: Skytteholms IP; Attendance: 9,115 |

| 5 August 1989 Tour of Sweden | Halmstads BK | 0–1 | Liverpool | Halmstad |
| | | Report | Beardsley | Stadium: Örjans Vall; Attendance: 8,676 |

| 7 August 1989 | HJK Helsinki | 0–0 | Liverpool | Helsinki |
| | | Report | | Stadium: Helsinki Olympic Stadium; Attendance: 10,820 |

| 30 August 1989 Bernabéu Trophy Final | Real Madrid CF | 2–0 | Liverpool | Madrid |
| | Sánchez 15'; Butragueño 18' | Report | | Stadium: Santiago Bernabéu Stadium; Attendance: 45,000; Referee: I.U. Azpitarte |

== Competitions ==
=== FA Charity Shield ===
12 August 1989
15:00 BST

| Arsenal | 0–1 | Liverpool |
|---|---|---|
| | Report | Beardsley 32' |

Wembley Stadium, London
Attendance: 63,149
Referee: Allan Gunn (Sussex)

| Arsenal | Liverpool |

| GK | 1 | (England) John Lukic |
| RB | 2 | (England) Lee Dixon |
| LB | 3 | (England) Nigel Winterburn |
| CM | 4 | (England) Michael Thomas |
| CB | 5 | (Republic of Ireland) David O'Leary |
| CB | 6 | (England) Tony Adams (c) |
| RM | 7 | (England) David Rocastle |
| CM | 8 | (England) Kevin Richardson |
| CF | 9 | (England) Alan Smith | (substituted off) 76' |
| CB | 10 | (England) Gus Caesar | (substituted off) 58' |
| LM | 11 | (England) Paul Merson |
Substitutes:
| MF | | (England) Brian Marwood | (substituted on) 58' |
| FW | | (Republic of Ireland) Niall Quinn | (substituted on) 76' |
Manager:
(Scotland) George Graham

| GK | 1 | (Zimbabwe) Bruce Grobbelaar |
| CB | 2 | (Sweden) Glenn Hysén |
| LB | 3 | (England) David Burrows |
| RM | 4 | (Scotland) Steve Nicol |
| CM | 5 | (Republic of Ireland) Ronnie Whelan |
| CB | 6 | (Scotland) Alan Hansen (c) |
| CF | 7 | (England) Peter Beardsley |
| RB | 8 | (England) Barry Venison |
| CF | 9 | (Wales) Ian Rush |
| LM | 10 | (England) John Barnes |
| CM | 11 | (England) Steve McMahon |
Substitutes:
| GK | 12 | (England) Mike Hooper |
| DF | 14 | (England) Gary Ablett |
| MF | 15 | (Denmark) Jan Molby |
| FW | 16 | (Republic of Ireland) John Aldridge |
Manager:
(Scotland) Kenny Dalglish

=== League Division 1 ===
==== League table ====
| Pos | Team | Pld | W | D | L | GF | GA | GD | Pts | Qualification or relegation |
|---|---|---|---|---|---|---|---|---|---|---|
| 1 | Liverpool (C) | 38 | 23 | 10 | 5 | 78 | 37 | +41 | 79 | Disqualified from the European Cup (Note: Liverpool were banned by UEFA from its competitions from the season 1985–86 on for 10 years, because of the Heysel Stadium disaster in 1985, involving Liverpool fans. The ban was eventually lifted for the 1991–92 season.) |
| 2 | Aston Villa | 38 | 21 | 7 | 10 | 57 | 38 | +19 | 70 | Qualification for the UEFA Cup first round |
| 3 | Tottenham Hotspur | 38 | 19 | 6 | 13 | 59 | 47 | +12 | 63 | |
| 4 | Arsenal | 38 | 18 | 8 | 12 | 54 | 38 | +16 | 62 | |
| 5 | Chelsea | 38 | 16 | 12 | 10 | 58 | 50 | +8 | 60 | |

Source: World Football
Rules for classification: 1) Points; 2) Goal difference; 3) Goals scored
(C) Champions

(1) Liverpool 89

==== Matches ====
| 19 August 1989 1 | Liverpool | 3–1 | Manchester City | Liverpool |
| 15:00 BST | Barnes 7' (pen.); Beardsley 60'; Nicol 90' | Report | Hinchcliffe 23'; McNab (yellow card) | Stadium: Anfield; Attendance: 37,628; Referee: Dave Phillips |

| 23 August 1989 2 | Aston Villa | 1–1 | Liverpool | Birmingham |
| 19:30 BST | Platt 60' | Report | Barnes 24' | Stadium: Villa Park; Attendance: 35,796; Referee: Ron Groves |

| 26 August 1989 3 | Luton Town | 0–0 | Liverpool | Luton |
| 15:00 BST | | Report | | Stadium: Kenilworth Road; Attendance: 11,124; Referee: Alan Gunn |

| 9 September 1989 4 | Derby County | 0–3 | Liverpool | Derby |
| 15:00 BST | | Report | Rush 50'; Barnes 82' (pen.); Beardsley 90' | Stadium: Baseball Ground; Attendance: 20,034; Referee: George Courtney |

| 12 September 1989 5 | Liverpool | 9–0 | Crystal Palace | Liverpool |
| 19:30 BST | Nicol 7', 90'; McMahon 15'; Rush 45'; Gillespie 56'; Beardsley 61'; Aldridge 67' (pen.); Barnes 79'; Hysén 82' | Report | | Stadium: Anfield; Attendance: 35,779; Referee: Keren Barratt |

| 16 September 1989 6 | Liverpool | 0–0 | Norwich City | Liverpool |
| 15:00 BST | | Report | | Stadium: Anfield; Attendance: 36,885; Referee: Roger Milford |

| 23 September 1989 7 | Everton | 1–3 | Liverpool | Liverpool |
| 15:00 BST | Newell 18' | Report | Barnes 33'; Rush 62', 64' | Stadium: Goodison Park; Attendance: 42,453; Referee: Bob Nixon |

| 14 October 1989 8 | Wimbledon | 1–2 | Liverpool | Wimbledon |
| 15:00 BST | Wise 49' | Report | Beardsley 3'; Whelan 55' | Stadium: Plough Lane; Attendance: 13,510; Referee: Lester Shapter |

| 21 October 1989 9 | Southampton | 4–1 | Liverpool | Southampton |
| 15:00 BST | Rideout 24'; Wallace 38', 55'; Le Tissier 83' | Report | Beardsley 57' (pen.) | Stadium: The Dell; Attendance: 20,501; Referee: Ray Lewis |

| 29 October 1989 10 | Liverpool | 1–0 | Tottenham Hotspur | Liverpool |
| 15:30 GMT | Barnes 25' | Report | | Stadium: Anfield; Attendance: 36,550; Referee: David Hutchison |

| 4 November 1989 11 | Liverpool | 0–1 | Coventry City | Liverpool |
| 15:00 GMT | | Report | Regis 47' | Stadium: Anfield; Attendance: 36,443; Referee: T. Simpson |

| 11 November 1989 12 | Queens Park Rangers | 3–2 | Liverpool | London |
| 15:00 GMT | Wright 27' (pen.), 36'; Falco 56' | Report | Barnes 32' (pen.), 58' | Stadium: Loftus Road; Attendance: 18,804; Referee: John E. Martin |

| 19 November 1989 13 | Millwall | 1–2 | Liverpool | London |
| 15:30 GMT | Thompson 38' | Report | Barnes 36'; Rush 70' | Stadium: The Den; Attendance: 13,547; Referee: Jim Ashworth |

| 26 November 1989 14 | Liverpool | 2–1 | Arsenal | Liverpool |
| 15:30 GMT | McMahon 30'; Barnes 65' | Report | Smith 79' | Stadium: Anfield; Attendance: 35,983; Referee: Mike Peck |

| 29 November 1989 15 | Sheffield Wednesday | 2–0 | Liverpool | Sheffield |
| 19:45 GMT | Hirst 54'; Atkinson 90' | Report | | Stadium: Hillsborough; Attendance: 32,732; Referee: Vic Callow |

| 2 December 1989 16 | Manchester City | 1–4 | Liverpool | Manchester |
| 15:00 GMT | Allen 59' (pen.) | Report | Rush 9', 88'; Beardsley 48'; McMahon 58' | Stadium: Maine Road; Attendance: 31,641; Referee: Arthur Ward |

| 9 December 1989 17 | Liverpool | 1–1 | Aston Villa | Liverpool |
| 15:00 GMT | Beardsley 64' | Report | Olney 21' | Stadium: Anfield; Attendance: 37,435; Referee: Ken Redfern |

| 16 December 1989 18 | Chelsea | 2–5 | Liverpool | London |
| 15:00 GMT | Durie 10'; Dixon 89' | Report | Beardsley 3'; Rush 5', 79'; Houghton 23'; McMahon 51' | Stadium: Stamford Bridge; Attendance: 31,005; Referee: George Courtney |

| 23 December 1989 19 | Liverpool | 0–0 | Manchester United | Liverpool |
| 12:30 GMT | | Report | | Stadium: Anfield; Attendance: 37,426; Referee: Joe Worrall |

| 26 December 1989 20 | Liverpool | 2–1 | Sheffield Wednesday | Liverpool |
| 15:00 GMT | Mølby 2'; Rush 84' | Report | Atkinson 49' | Stadium: Anfield; Attendance: 37,488; Referee: Peter Tyldesley |

| 30 December 1989 21 | Liverpool | 1–0 | Charlton Athletic | Liverpool |
| 15:00 GMT | Barnes 17' | Report | | Stadium: Anfield; Attendance: 36,678; Referee: John Key |

| 1 January 1990 22 | Nottingham Forest | 2–2 | Liverpool | Nottingham |
| 17:05 GMT | Hodge 50'; Clough 60' (pen.) | Report | Rush 13', 38' | Stadium: City Ground; Attendance: 24,518; Referee: Alf Buksh |

| 13 January 1990 23 | Liverpool | 2–2 | Luton Town | Liverpool |
| 15:00 GMT | Barnes 32'; Nicol 75' | Report | Black 71'; Nogan 73' | Stadium: Anfield; Attendance: 35,312; Referee: Trelford Mills |

| 20 January 1990 24 | Crystal Palace | 0–2 | Liverpool | London |
| 15:00 GMT | | Report | Rush 9'; Beardsley 62' | Stadium: Selhurst Park; Attendance: 29,807; Referee: Martin Bodenham |

| 3 February 1990 25 | Liverpool | 2–1 | Everton | Liverpool |
| 15:00 GMT | Barnes 10'; Beardsley 29' (pen.) | Report | Sharp 43' | Stadium: Anfield; Attendance: 38,730; Referee: David Allison |

| 10 February 1990 26 | Norwich City | 0–0 | Liverpool | Norwich |
| 15:05 GMT | | Report | Hysén (red card) 51' | Stadium: Carrow Road; Attendance: 20,210; Referee: Lester Shapter |

| 3 March 1990 27 | Liverpool | 1–0 | Millwall | Liverpool |
| 15:00 GMT | Gillespie 83' | Report | | Stadium: Anfield; Attendance: 36,427; Referee: George Tyson |

| 18 March 1990 28 | Manchester United | 1–2 | Liverpool | Manchester |
| 15:30 GMT | Whelan 82' (o.g.) | Report | Barnes 15', 55' (pen.) | Stadium: Old Trafford; Attendance: 46,629; Referee: George Courtney |

| 21 March 1990 29 | Tottenham Hotspur | 1–0 | Liverpool | London |
| 20:05 GMT | Stewart 83' | Report | | Stadium: White Hart Lane; Attendance: 25,656; Referee: Keith Hackett |

| 31 March 1990 30 | Liverpool | 3–2 | Southampton | Liverpool |
| 15:00 BST | Barnes 15'; Osman 73' (o.g.); Rush 82' | Report | Rideout 35'; Case 48' | Stadium: Anfield; Attendance: 37,027; Referee: Terry Holbrook |

| 3 April 1990 31 | Liverpool | 2–1 | Wimbledon | Liverpool |
| 19:30 BST | Rush 10'; Gillespie 44'; Hysén (yellow card); McMahon (yellow card) | Report | Hansen 70' (o.g.); Fashanu (yellow card) | Stadium: Anfield; Attendance: 33,319; Referee: Ken Redfern |

| 11 April 1990 32 | Charlton Athletic | 0–4 | Liverpool | London |
| 19:45 BST | | Report | Rosenthal 26', 50', 62'; Barnes 87' | Stadium: Selhurst Park; Attendance: 13,982; Referee: David Axcell |

| 14 April 1990 33 | Liverpool | 2–2 | Nottingham Forest | Liverpool |
| 15:00 BST | Rosenthal 12'; McMahon 15' | Report | Hodge 52'; Jemson 70' | Stadium: Anfield; Attendance: 37,265; Referee: Keren Barratt |

| 18 April 1990 34 | Arsenal | 1–1 | Liverpool | London |
| 20:05 BST | Merson 40' | Report | Barnes 86' | Stadium: Highbury; Attendance: 33,395; Referee: Alan Seville |

| 21 April 1990 35 | Liverpool | 4–1 | Chelsea | Liverpool |
| 15:00 BST | Rosenthal 25'; Nicol 36', 80'; Rush 82' | Report | Dixon 90' | Stadium: Anfield; Attendance: 38,431; Referee: Roger Milford |

| 28 April 1990 36 | Liverpool | 2–1 | Queens Park Rangers | Liverpool |
| 15:00 BST | Rush 40'; Barnes 63' (pen.) | Report | Wegerle 14' | Stadium: Anfield; Attendance: 37,758; Referee: Robbie Hart |

| 1 May 1990 37 | Liverpool | 1–0 | Derby County | Liverpool |
| 19:30 BST | Gillespie | Report | | Stadium: Anfield; Attendance: 38,038; Referee: Brian Hill |

| 5 May 1990 38 | Coventry City | 1–6 | Liverpool | Coventry |
| 15:00 BST | Gallacher 2' | Report | Rush 16'; Barnes 37', 39', 61'; Rosenthal 50', 69' | Stadium: Highfield Road; Attendance: 23,204; Referee: Fangon Roberts |

=== F.A. Cup ===
==== Matches ====
| 6 January 1990 3 | Swansea City | 0–0 | Liverpool | Swansea |
| 15:00 GMT | | Report | | Stadium: Vetch Field; Attendance: 16,098; Referee: Alan Gunn |

| 9 January 1990 3 | Liverpool | 8–0 | Swansea City | Liverpool |
| 19:30 GMT | Barnes 21', 43'; Whelan 40'; Rush 53', 77', 83'; Beardsley 54'; Nicol 86' | Report | | Stadium: Anfield; Attendance: 29,194; Referee: Alan Gunn |

| 28 January 1990 4 | Norwich City | 0–0 | Liverpool | Norwich |
| 15:05 GMT | | Report | | Stadium: Carrow Road; Attendance: 23,152; Referee: Keith Hackett |

| 31 January 1990 4 | Liverpool | 3–1 | Norwich City | Liverpool |
| 19:30 GMT | Nicol 17'; Barnes 56'; Beardsley 64' (pen.) | Report | Fleck 19' | Stadium: Anfield; Attendance: 29,339; Referee: Keith Hackett |

| 17 February 1990 5 | Liverpool | 3–0 | Southampton | Liverpool |
| 15:00 GMT | Rush 39'; Beardsley 64'; Nicol 77' | Report | | Stadium: Anfield; Attendance: 35,961; Referee: Neil Midgley |

| 11 March 1990 6 | Queens Park Rangers | 2–2 | Liverpool | London |
| 15:05 GMT | Wilkins 29'; Barker 83' | Report | Barnes 55'; Rush 80' | Stadium: Loftus Road; Attendance: 21,057; Referee: Brian Hill |

| 14 March 1990 6 | Liverpool | 1–0 | Queens Park Rangers | Liverpool |
| 19:30 GMT | Beardsley 4' | Report | | Stadium: Anfield; Attendance: 38,090; Referee: Alan Seville |

| 8 April 1990 Semi-final | Liverpool | 3–4 (a.e.t.) | Crystal Palace | Birmingham |
| 12:00 BST | Rush 14'; McMahon 81'; Barnes 83' | Report | Bright 46'; O'Reilly 70'; Gray 88'; Pardew 109' | Stadium: Villa Park; Attendance: 38,389; Referee: George Courtney |

=== Football League Cup ===
==== Matches ====
| 19 September 1989 1 | Liverpool | 5–2 | Wigan Athletic | Liverpool |
| 19:30 BST | Hysén 4'; Rush 64', 66'; Beardsley 81'; Barnes 88' | Report | Griffiths 18'; Thompson 54' | Stadium: Anfield; Attendance: 19,231; Referee: R Dilkes |

| 4 October 1989 1 | Wigan Athletic | 0–3 (2–8 agg.) | Liverpool | Liverpool |
| 19:30 BST | | Report | Staunton 59', 72', 88' | Stadium: Anfield; Attendance: 17,954; Referee: PL Wright |
Note: Played at Anfield because Springfield Park did not meet safety standards.

| 25 October 1989 2 | Arsenal | 1–0 | Liverpool | London |
| 19:45 BST | Smith 80' | Report | | Stadium: Highbury; Attendance: 40,814; Referee: Alan Gunn |
