= Umbro International Tournament =

- Founded: 1996
- Abolished: 1997
- Teams: 4
- Most championships: Chelsea (2 titles)

The Umbro International Tournament was a pre-season football tournament, sponsored by the sportswear manufacturer Umbro. The tournament was held twice, hosted by Nottingham Forest in 1996 and Everton in 1997. Both editions were won by Chelsea.

== 1996 Umbro International Tournament ==
1996 Umbro International Tournament
Tournament details
- Cities: Nottingham, England
- Dates: 3–4 August
- Teams: 4
- Venue: 1

Final positions
- Champions: Chelsea
- Runners-up: Ajax
- Third place: Manchester United
- Fourth place: Nottingham Forest

Tournament statistics
- Matches played: 4
- Goals scored: 9 (2.25 per match)
- Top scorer: Brian McClair (2 goals)

=== Semi-finals ===
3 August 1996

| Nottingham Forest | 0–0 | Chelsea |
|---|---|---|
| | Report |
Penalties
| Pearce (penalty missed); Gemmill (penalty missed) | 3–4 | (penalty missed) Nicholls |

City Ground, Nottingham
Attendance: 27,427
Referee: David Elleray
3 August 1996

| Ajax | 2–1 | Manchester United |
|---|---|---|
| F. de Boer 35'; Musampa 86' | Report | McClair 77' |

City Ground, Nottingham

=== Third-place match ===
4 August 1996

| Nottingham Forest | 1–3 | Manchester United |
|---|---|---|
| Campbell 10' | Report | Beckham 82'; McClair 87'; P. Neville 90' |

City Ground, Nottingham
Attendance: 21,760
Referee: Peter Jones

=== Final ===
4 August 1996

| Chelsea | 2–0 | Ajax |
|---|---|---|
| Wise 6'; Petrescu 17' | Report |

City Ground, Nottingham

== 1997 Umbro International Tournament ==
1997 Umbro International Tournament
Tournament details
- Cities: Liverpool, England
- Dates: 26–27 July
- Teams: 4
- Venue: 1

Final positions
- Champions: Chelsea
- Runners-up: Everton
- Third place: Ajax
- Fourth place: Newcastle United

Tournament statistics
- Matches played: 4
- Goals scored: 10 (2.5 per match)
- Top scorer(s): Benni McCarthy; Gianfranco Zola (2 goals)

=== Semi-finals ===
26 July 1997

| Chelsea | 1–1 | Newcastle United |
|---|---|---|
| Poyet 63' | | Tomasson 45' (pen.) |
Penalties
| Sinclair (penalty scored); Nicholls (penalty scored); Leboeuf (penalty scored) | 3–1 | (penalty scored) Beardsley; (penalty missed) Pearce; (penalty missed) Asprilla; (penalty missed) Tomasson |

Goodison Park, Liverpool
Attendance: 15,264
Referee: Stephen Lodge
26 July 1997

| Everton | 1–0 | Ajax |
|---|---|---|
| Speed 32' |

Goodison Park, Liverpool
Attendance: 15,249
Referee: Peter Jones

=== Third-place match ===
27 July 1997

| Ajax | 3–0 | Newcastle United |
|---|---|---|
| McCarthy 76', 86'; Oliseh 83' |

Goodison Park, Liverpool
Attendance: 10,289
Referee: Peter Jones

=== Final ===
27 July 1997

| Everton | 1–3 | Chelsea |
|---|---|---|
| Ferguson 78' | | Vialli 67'; Zola 82', 90' |

Goodison Park, Liverpool
Attendance: 10,289
Referee: Stephen Lodge

== See also ==
- Wembley International Tournament
