= Steve Nicol =

Scottish footballer and manager (born 1961)

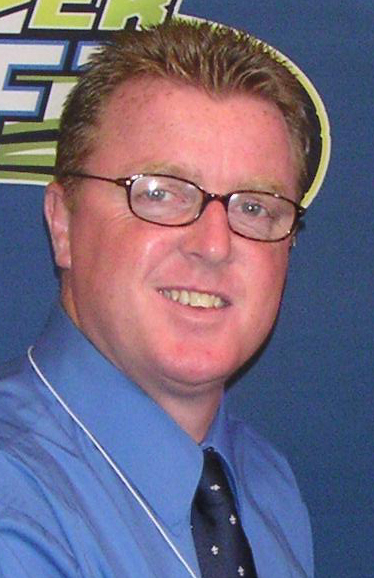
- Nicol at the 2005 MLS SuperDraft

Personal information
- Full name: Stephen Nicol
- Date of birth: 11 December 1961 (age 64)
- Place of birth: Troon, Scotland
- Height: 1.78 m (5 ft 10 in)
- Position: Right back

Youth career
- 1970–1977: Troon Thistle
- 1977–1979: Ayr United

Senior career*
| Years | Team | Apps | (Gls) |
| 1979–1981 | Ayr United | 70 | (7) |
| 1981–1994 | Liverpool | 343 | (36) |
| 1994–1996 | Notts County | 32 | (2) |
| 1996–1998 | Sheffield Wednesday | 49 | (0) |
| 1998 | → West Bromwich Albion (loan) | 9 | (0) |
| 1998–1999 | Doncaster Rovers | 25 | (0) |
| 1999–2001 | Boston Bulldogs | 41 | (0) |
| Total | | 569 | (45) |

International career
| 1981–1984 | Scotland U-21 | 14 | (0) |
| 1984–1992 | Scotland | 27 | (0) |

Managerial career
- 1995: Notts County
- 1999: New England Revolution (interim)
- 2000–2001: Boston Bulldogs
- 2002–2011: New England Revolution
- * Club domestic league appearances and goals

Stephen Nicol (born 11 December 1961) is a Scottish retired professional footballer who mainly played as a right back and occasionally played in other positions across defence and midfield. He played for the successful Liverpool teams of the 1980s. He was also a regular member of the Scotland national team and represented his country at the 1986 FIFA World Cup.

Nicol started his playing career with local club Ayr United, moving to Liverpool in 1981. He won five English league championships, three FA Cup winners medals, and the 1984 European Cup during 14 years with Liverpool. Nicol played for several other English teams after leaving Liverpool, including Notts County, Sheffield Wednesday and Doncaster Rovers, before emigrating to the United States in 1999. He was most recently coach of the New England Revolution and was the longest-tenured head coach in MLS to coach a single club. Nicol is now a commentator for ESPN FC.

== Club career ==
=== Ayr United ===
Nicol began his career with Troon Thistle at age 9, then joined Ayr United at age 16, and started playing for the first team in 1979, where he spent just over two seasons with the Scottish side, racking up 70 league appearances, before Liverpool manager Bob Paisley decided to pay what turned out to be a bargain price, £300,000, to bring Nicol to Anfield on 26 October 1981.

=== Liverpool ===
Nicol, who was signed by Bob Paisley, had to wait almost an entire year to make his senior debut for Liverpool and two years for a regular first team place, arriving at the club halfway through a 20-year period of dominance.

He made his Reds debut on 31 August 1982 in a 0–0 league draw with Birmingham City at St Andrew's and made a further three league appearances that season. The Reds finished as league champions for the 14th time, but Nicol did not make enough appearances to collect a title winner's medal.

Nicol became a regular in the 1983–84 season under new boss Joe Fagan. He also scored his first goal for the club on 22 October 1983, in a 1–0 league victory over Queens Park Rangers at Loftus Road. He went on to win a League championship medal by the end of his first full season, having not appeared enough times the previous season to qualify for a medal. However, he was not picked for the League Cup final victory over fierce Merseyside derby rivals Everton in the first-ever all-Merseyside final. He came on as a substitute for Craig Johnston in the European Cup final against Roma in the Stadio Olimpico, Rome. After a 1–1 draw, the match went to a penalty shootout. Nicol missed his spot-kick, but Roma failed to score two of their penalties and Liverpool won the competition.

Nicol became a first-team regular for many subsequent seasons, winning the league championship and FA Cup "double" in 1986 under the guidance of Kenny Dalglish, pipping Everton to the title by just two points and then beating them 3–1 in the first-ever all Merseyside FA Cup final. He was also settling into an international career, which would ultimately yield 27 caps and a place in the 1986 FIFA World Cup in Mexico, with Scotland. A versatile player, he played most often at right back following the departure of Phil Neal in 1985, though he also featured at left back, in the centre of defence and as a midfield player. He even played up front on a couple of occasions. He earned the nickname 'Chopsy' because of how he pronounced the word 'chips'.

In the 1987–88 season, he was in a good goal scoring form, despite playing in a position not naturally conducive to attacking. This form included a memorable hat-trick at Newcastle United and a phenomenal long-range header to win at Arsenal on the opening day of the season. Nicol's defensive qualities were also much admired as Liverpool coasted to the league title, but missed out on another "double" when Wimbledon surprisingly beat them 1–0 in the FA Cup final at Wembley. Nicol was the last Liverpool player to have a chance to equalise and force extra-time, but his diving header in injury time flew narrowly over the crossbar.

A year later, Nicol played his part as Liverpool won the FA Cup against Everton, winning 3–2 after extra time, but lost the League title in a decider against Arsenal with virtually the last kick of the season. The campaign ended on a personal high for Nicol as he was named Footballer of the Year by football writers.

Nicol accompanied his teammates to many of the funerals and memorial services of the 96 fans who died at the Hillsborough disaster. Like many others in the Liverpool squad, Hillsborough was the second tragedy Nicol had witnessed. Four years earlier, just before the 1985 European Cup final at the Heysel Stadium, Brussels, Liverpool fans had charged a section of, mainly, Juventus supporters, causing a retaining wall to collapse, killing 39 people. As a result of the Heysel disaster, a five-year ban was placed on English clubs in European competitions, with Liverpool being banned for six years. Nicol would be one of the few players still with Liverpool when their ban from European competitions was finally lifted.

When Liverpool beat Crystal Palace 9–0 during the 1989–90 season to accumulate the club's biggest-ever League victory, Nicol was the only player to score twice, getting the first and last goals of the game in the seventh and 90th minutes. Liverpool regained the league title that season – their last until 2019–20 – and, two years later, Nicol was in the team which, under Graeme Souness, won the FA Cup again in 1992, this time beating Sunderland 2–0.

He remained a regular player for Liverpool until the start of the 1994–95 season, when he was forced onto the sidelines with the arrival of new defenders Phil Babb and John Scales. His final appearance for the club was a League Cup tie against Burnley in October 1994.

In 13 years at Anfield, he had played a total of 343 league games and scored 36 goals. At the time of leaving, he was the club's most senior player in terms of unbroken service. Although Ian Rush had joined the club more than a year before Nicol, Rush's service had been disrupted by a year-long spell at Juventus.

=== Notts County ===
Nicol stayed at Liverpool until 20 January 1995 when he took on a player-assistant coach role at Notts County after being recruited by County's former Everton manager Howard Kendall. He stayed at Meadow Lane for just 10 months, playing 32 times. After Kendall was sacked, Nicol received his first taste of management when he took charge of the club with two other players for the final months of the Magpies' disastrous 1994–95 campaign. But his efforts were not enough to save Notts County from relegation to Division Two.

=== Sheffield Wednesday ===
Following the end of the season, Nicol next moved to Sheffield Wednesday in November 1995, where he made his debut against former derby rivals Everton at Goodison Park on 25 November in a game which ended in a 2–2 draw. However, probably Nicol's best memory of his time at Hillsborough happened on 7 December 1996 when his Wednesday side traveled to his old stomping ground of Anfield. The Sheffield side completely nullified the Liverpool attack, which contained the likes of Robbie Fowler, Steve McManaman and John Barnes, and came away with a 1–0 victory with Nicol playing a major part in the Wednesday defence.

=== English lower divisions, move to America ===
Nicol went on to make 49 league appearances before spending a spell on loan at West Bromwich Albion during the 1997–98 season where he played nine games. He then had a short spell with Doncaster Rovers before heading to the U.S. to take a player-coach position with the Boston Bulldogs of the A-League in 1999.

In September of that year, he took over as interim player-coach (he did not make any playing appearances) with the New England Revolution of Major League Soccer for the final two games of the season, winning both. He returned to the Boston Bulldogs as player-coach for the 2000 and 2001 seasons before re-joining the Revs in 2002 as an assistant coach.

== International career ==
Nicol was first capped at the senior level for Scotland on 12 September 1984, soon after becoming a first-team regular for Liverpool. Jock Stein gave Nicol his international debut in a friendly with Yugoslavia. His debut was a memorable one, as he helped Scotland beat Yugoslavia 6–1 in a friendly at Hampden Park in front of a crowd of 18,512. Helping Nicol settle in with the national team were club mates Kenny Dalglish and captain Graeme Souness, who both scored. The last of his 27 full caps for Scotland came on 11 September 1991 in a 2–2 draw in Switzerland during the Euro 92 qualifiers. He was in Scotland's squad for the 1986 World Cup.

== Coaching career ==
Nicol's began his coaching career at Notts County F.C. as an assistant-coach / player for Howard Kendall. Following Kendall's dismissal, Nicol took over as club manager on an interim basis. He returned to playing following the appointment of former Shelbourne F.C. boss Colin Murphy.

In 1999, Nicol moved to the United States to play for the Boston Bulldogs, and became player-manager following the departure of John Kerr.

=== New England Revolution ===
On 30 September 1999, Nicol took over interim coaching duties for the New England Revolution of Major League Soccer following the dismissal of then-player-coach Walter Zenga.

At the conclusion of the 1999 season, Nicol returned to the Boston Bulldogs, but would rejoin the Revolution as an assistant to Fernando Clavijo on 10 January 2002. On 23 May 2002, Nicol was again named interim manager, this time following Clavijo's dismissal.

In his first year as head coach, Nicol lead the Revolution to its first-ever MLS Cup final and was subsequently named MLS Coach of the Year. He was officially named head coach of the Revolution on 6 November 2002.

Nicol would go on to become one of the most successful coaches in MLS history, and the most successful manager in Revolution history, bringing a period of "sustained excellence" to the club during his MLS-record ten year tenure as head coach.

Under Nicol's leadership, the Revolution advanced to the MLS Eastern Conference Finals every year until 2008 and returned to the MLS Cup final in 2005, 2006 and 2007, making the playoffs every year over a seven-season stretch. He was a finalist for MLS Coach of the Year in 2005, but lost to Dominic Kinnear.

In 2007, Nicol also delivered the first silverware in Revolution history, winning the U.S. Open cup final over FC Dallas. The following season Nicol guided the Revolution to their first-ever international trophy, as they won the 2008 North American SuperLiga over Houston Dynamo FC.

While coaching the Revolution, Nicol was selected to represent Major League Soccer on multiple occasions as well. On 11 August 2005, MLS announced Nicol as coach of the "MLS Select Team" to face Real Madrid CF on August 23 in Spain. The league also selected Nicol to coach the MLS All-Stars on two occasions, in 2007 vs. Celtic F.C., and in 2008 vs. West Ham United F.C.

In 2010, Nicol guided the Revolution back to the SuperLiga final, where the club lost to Atlético Morelia. The Revolution also failed to qualify for the playoffs for the first time under Nicol's tenure in 2010, and would again miss the playoffs during the 2011 season. On 24 October 2011, Nicol and the Revolution mutually decided to part ways, ending his 10-season tenure. Nicol departed the Revolution as the club's longest tenured manager, leading the club in games coached, wins, and playoff appearances.

On November 4, 2012, Nicol was inducted into the New England Soccer Hall of Fame.

== Career statistics ==
=== Club ===
Appearances and goals by club, season and competition
| Club | Season | League | | | FA Cup | | League Cup | | Europe | | Other | | Total | |
| Club | Season | Division | Apps | Goals | Apps | Goals | Apps | Goals | Apps | Goals | Apps | Goals | Apps | Goals |
|---|---|---|---|---|---|---|---|---|---|---|---|---|---|---|
| Liverpool | 1982–83 | First Division | 4 | 0 | 0 | 0 | 0 | 0 | 0 | 0 | 0 | 0 | 4 | 0 |
| Liverpool | 1983–84 | First Division | 23 | 5 | 2 | 0 | 9 | 2 | 4 (Note: Appearances in European Cup) | 0 | 0 | 0 | 38 | 7 |
| Liverpool | 1984–85 | First Division | 31 | 5 | 6 | 0 | 2 | 0 | 6 | 2 | 3 (Note: One appearance in FA Charity Shield, one appearance in European Super Cup, one appearance in Intercontinental Cup) | 0 | 48 | 7 |
| Liverpool | 1985–86 | First Division | 34 | 4 | 4 | 0 | 3 | 0 | – | | 6 (Note: Appearances in Football League Super Cup) | 0 | 47 | 4 |
| Liverpool | 1986–87 | First Division | 14 | 3 | 0 | 0 | 5 | 1 | – | | 2 | 1 | 21 | 5 |
| Liverpool | 1987–88 | First Division | 40 | 6 | 7 | 0 | 3 | 1 | – | | 0 | 0 | 50 | 7 |
| Liverpool | 1988–89 | First Division | 38 | 2 | 6 | 0 | 6 | 0 | – | | 2 (Note: Appearances in Football League Centenary Trophy) | 0 | 52 | 2 |
| Liverpool | 1989–90 | First Division | 23 | 6 | 7 | 3 | 2 | 0 | – | | 1 (Note: Appearance in FA Charity Shield) | 0 | 33 | 9 |
| Liverpool | 1990–91 | First Division | 35 | 3 | 7 | 0 | 2 | 0 | – | | 0 | 0 | 44 | 3 |
| Liverpool | 1991–92 | First Division | 34 | 1 | 8 | 0 | 3 | 0 | 7 (Note: Appearances in UEFA Cup) | 0 | – | | 52 | 1 |
| Liverpool | 1992–93 | Premier League | 32 | 0 | 1 | 0 | 4 | 0 | 2 (Note: Appearances in UEFA Cup Winners' Cup) | 0 | 0 | 0 | 39 | 0 |
| Liverpool | 1993–94 | Premier League | 31 | 1 | 2 | 0 | 2 | 0 | – | | – | | 35 | 1 |
| Liverpool | 1994–95 | Premier League | 4 | 0 | 0 | 0 | 1 | 0 | – | | – | | 5 | 0 |
| Career total | | | 343 | 36 | 50 | 3 | 42 | 4 | 19 | 2 | 14 | 1 | 468 | 46 |

=== International ===
Appearances and goals by national team and year
| National team | Year | Apps | Goals |
|---|---|---|---|
| Scotland | 1984 | 3 | 0 |
| Scotland | 1985 | 4 | 0 |
| Scotland | 1986 | 4 | 0 |
| Scotland | 1987 | 2 | 0 |
| Scotland | 1988 | 6 | 0 |
| Scotland | 1989 | 4 | 0 |
| Scotland | 1990 | 1 | 0 |
| Scotland | 1991 | 3 | 0 |
| Total | | 27 | 0 |

== Honours ==
=== Player ===
Liverpool

- Football League First Division:1983–84, 1985–86, 1987–88, 1989–90
- FA Cup: 1985–86, 1988–89, 1991–92; runner-up: 1987–88
- Football League Cup: 1983–84
- FA Charity Shield: 1989
- European Cup: 1983–84
- Football League Super Cup: 1985–86

=== Manager ===
New England Revolution

- North American SuperLiga: 2008
- US Open Cup: 2007

=== Individual ===
- PFA Team of the Year: 1988–89 First Division
- Football Writers' Association Footballer of the Year: 1989
- MLS Coach of the Year Award: 2002

== See also ==
- List of Major League Soccer coaches
