= 1989 FA Charity Shield =

- The match programme cover
Arsenal	Liverpool
0	1
- Date: 12 August 1989
- Venue: Wembley Stadium, London
- Man of the Match: Glenn Hysén (Liverpool)
- Referee: Allan Gunn (Sussex)
- Attendance: 63,149
- Weather: Warm; 21 °C (70 °F)

The 1989 FA Charity Shield (also known as the Tennent's FA Charity Shield for sponsorship reasons) was the 67th Charity Shield, an annual English football match played between the winners of the previous season's Football League and FA Cup. It was held at Wembley Stadium on 12 August 1989. The match was contested by Arsenal, champions of the 1988–89 Football League and Liverpool, who beat Everton in the final of the 1988–89 FA Cup. Watched by a crowd of 63,149, Liverpool won the match 1–0.

This was Arsenal's 10th Shield appearance and Liverpool's 14th. The two clubs had met in the last game of the previous season, in a title decider at Anfield which Arsenal won 2–0 with a late goal from Michael Thomas. Both clubs also faced each other in the Makita International Tournament at Wembley the previous month; Arsenal won the match 1–0. Journalists previewing the game argued this year's Shield had lost its spectacle given Liverpool's recent successes in the event as well as the prospect of Arsenal beating Liverpool for a third time.

New signing Glenn Hysén made his competitive debut for Liverpool and Ian Rush started ahead of fellow striker John Aldridge. For Arsenal, Gus Caesar replaced Steve Bould in the starting team. The only goal of the match came in the first half – a long ball from Barry Venison floated around the Arsenal defence and found Peter Beardsley in the penalty area to score. Afterwards Liverpool manager Kenny Dalglish spoke of his delight at his team's performance and the Arsenal manager George Graham was complimentary of his opponents.

== Background ==
The FA Charity Shield was founded in 1908 as a successor to the Sheriff of London Charity Shield. It was a contest between the respective champions of the Football League and Southern League, which then became an event for select teams of amateur and professional players by 1913. In 1921, it was played between the Football League champions and FA Cup winners for the first time; this became standard practise from 1930. Wembley Stadium acted as the host of the Shield from 1974.

Arsenal qualified for the 1989 FA Charity Shield as winners of the 1988–89 Football League First Division. The team played Liverpool at Anfield in the final game of the season and needed to win by two clear goals to be crowned champions. Alan Smith scored for Arsenal early in the second half to make it 1–0, and Michael Thomas's goal with seconds left of the match ensured the team won the league title. Liverpool, days before the league encounter with Arsenal, defeated Everton to win the 1989 FA Cup Final which meant they obtained the other Charity Shield place.

This was Arsenal's first appearance in the Charity Shield in 10 years; prior to the game they had won seven Shields (1930, 1931, 1933, 1934, 1938, 1948 and 1953), and lost three (1935, 1936 and 1979). By contrast, Liverpool had won seven previous Shields outright (1966, 1974, 1976, 1979, 1980, 1982 and 1988), shared two with Manchester United (1965 and 1977) and one apiece with Everton (1986) and West Ham United (1984). The club was runners-up in three Shields (1971, 1983 and 1984).

== Pre-match ==
This was the second time in a fortnight that Arsenal and Liverpool had played each other; at the end of July, the two teams competed in the Makita International Tournament at Wembley. Arsenal won the game by a single goal to win the tournament and then on their pre-season travels beat Argentinian champions Independiente. The spectacle of the Charity Shield was lost on certain football journalists previewing the match, because of Liverpool's recent successes in the Shield as well as the prospect of Arsenal beating Liverpool for a third time in succession. David Lacey wrote in The Guardian of 12 August 1989: "The FA Charity Shield is now more of a pre-season finale than a pipe opener for the main event," and Stuart Jones of The Times went further in his assessment of its decline:

Whereas it was once an eagerly-awaited showpiece, it resembles in the modern age little more than another public training exercise for sides who are increasingly being invited to practise for the season in more lucrative and prestigious events on foreign fields.

Liverpool striker Ian Rush, who in the previous season sustained a knee injury and was treated for shingles and hepatitis, said before the match: "I'm in great shape. Fitter than I have been since I came back from Italy."

== Match ==
=== Team selection ===
Arsenal were without injured defender Steve Bould, but Nigel Winterburn returned to full action, as did Brian Marwood – he recovered from a successful Achilles tendon operation. Manager George Graham deployed a 5–3–2 formation; Gus Caesar was brought into the defence to replace Bould.

Liverpool had no injury concerns for the game other than long-term absentee Gary Gillespie; New signing Glenn Hysén made his competitive debut for the club and striker John Aldridge was named on the substitutes bench; manager Kenny Dalglish lined the team up in a 4–4–2 formation. Alan Hansen, who had missed Liverpool's final nine matches of the previous season, was restored as captain.

=== Summary ===
Liverpool created the first chance of the game in the 20th minute. A pass from John Barnes sent Steve Nicol clear to shoot, but his effort saw the ball roll wide of the far post. Liverpool created a further opportunity six minutes after – from a free-kick delivered by Barnes on the left, Rush managed to outjump his marker and head the ball in the direction of the Arsenal goal. It however hit the near post and rebounded in the direction of Arsenal goalkeeper John Lukic. Minutes after the half-hour mark, Liverpool scored the opening goal – a long ball from Barry Venison went behind the Arsenal defence and reached Peter Beardsley. Unimpeded, he controlled the ball and shot it with his right foot to score. Arsenal's Kevin Richardson missed a chance to level the scoreline after good play by Lee Dixon; from outside the penalty box he scuffed his shot and the ball went over the crossbar.

Liverpool continued to dominate proceedings in the second half; The Observer football correspondent Frank McGhee noted Arsenal's "obvious need for a more adventurous approach." The club's fans demanded Marwood's introduction to the match, and in the 58th minute the player came on for Caesar. This meant Arsenal's formation was tweaked to 4–4–2, with a flat back four defence. Arsenal found it hard to contain the Liverpool attack; Lukic saved an effort from Beardsley one-handed, but only could turn the ball out for a corner. A pass by Ronnie Whelan managed to split the Arsenal defence and find Nicol; Winterburn however put an end to the move with a tackle. David Burrows's attempt on goal was blocked by O'Leary later on and Lukic did enough to save Rush's shot with his legs.

=== Details ===
12 August 1989
15:00 BST

Arsenal	0–1	Liverpool
		Beardsley 32'

Wembley Stadium, London
Attendance: 63,149
Referee: Allan Gunn (Sussex)

Arsenal	Liverpool

GK	1	(England) John Lukic
RB	2	(England) Lee Dixon
LB	3	(England) Nigel Winterburn
CM	4	(England) Michael Thomas
CB	5	(Republic of Ireland) David O'Leary
CB	6	(England) Tony Adams (c)
CM	7	(England) David Rocastle
CM	8	(England) Kevin Richardson
CF	9	(England) Alan Smith	(substituted off) 76'
CB	10	(England) Gus Caesar	(substituted off) 58'
CF	11	(England) Paul Merson
Substitutes:
MF	12	(England) Brian Marwood	(substituted on) 58'
FW	13	(Republic of Ireland) Niall Quinn	(substituted on) 76'
MF		(England) Perry Groves
MF		(Northern Ireland) Steve Morrow
GK		(England) Alan Miller
Manager:
(Scotland) George Graham

GK	1	(Zimbabwe) Bruce Grobbelaar
CB	2	(Sweden) Glenn Hysén
LB	3	(England) David Burrows
RM	4	(Scotland) Steve Nicol
CM	5	(Republic of Ireland) Ronnie Whelan
CB	6	(Scotland) Alan Hansen (c)
CF	7	(England) Peter Beardsley
RB	8	(England) Barry Venison
CF	9	(Wales) Ian Rush
LM	10	(England) John Barnes
CM	11	(England) Steve McMahon
Substitutes:
GK	12	(England) Mike Hooper
DF	14	(England) Gary Ablett
MF	15	(Denmark) Jan Mølby
FW	16	(Republic of Ireland) John Aldridge
Manager:
(Scotland) Kenny Dalglish

== Post-match ==
Dalglish was pleased with Liverpool's game and told the press: "The most important thing is that we got our own standard of football right. We were the better team in all departments and we know that if we get it right then we will be there or thereabouts." Hysén, the man of the match, said of his centre-back partner Hansen: "It is so easy playing alongside Alan. He tells you where to go and what position to take up." He saw similarities with Liverpool and playing for a national team: "The standards are so amazingly high. I just want to win things with them."

Graham praised his opponents – "There is no need to take anything away from Liverpool because they were terrific", and felt his team could have been more clinical. He described Arsenal's performance as "below par" and was upbeat about the season ahead: "This might have done us the world of good. We will be all right by next week – don't worry about that."

== See also ==
- 1989–90 Football League
- 1989–90 FA Cup
