= Ken Barnes (soldier) =

Jamaican soldier and footballer (1935–2009)

Colonel Roderick Kenrick Barnes
- Born: 23 August 1935; Port of Spain, Trinidad and Tobago
- Died: 19 February 2009 (aged 73); Saint Andrew Parish, Jamaica
- Citizenship: Jamaica
- Occupation: Soldier
- Years active: 1956 – 1989
- Spouse: Frances Jeanne Hill
- Children: 3, including John Barnes

Colonel Roderick Kenrick Barnes (23 August 1935 – 19 February 2009), known as Ken Barnes was an officer in the Jamaica Defence Force, a sports administrator. Barnes represented Jamaica in football in the 1950s becoming captain and later manager of the team. He was the father of Liverpool and England footballer John Barnes.

== Biography ==
Barnes was born to Sylvester Barnes, a Civil Servant, and Ena Phipps in Port of Spain, Trinidad and Tobago. He was educated at St Mary’s College in Trinidad but also spent time at the Royal Military Academy at Sandhurst in the UK. He emigrated to Jamaica in 1956 as a member of the West India Regiment.

In 1960, he married Frances Jeanne Hill, the daughter of journalist, politician and trade unionist, Frank Hill, who had been imprisoned by the Jamaican governor, Sir Arthur Richards in 1942, along with his brother Ken, after being accused of trying to overthrow the government. Jeanne herself was arrested in 1964 when she took part in a demonstration against political bias at the Jamaica Broadcasting Corporation.

Barnes joined the Jamaica Defence Force when formed after the nation's 1962 independence when he was initially commanding officer of the 1st Battalion Jamaica Regiment.

In 1983 he was appointed commander of the Caribbean Peace Force formed to support the United States invasion of Grenada following a coup which had led to the house arrest and execution of Prime Minister of Grenada, Maurice Bishop.

While in the army, he was a semi-professional footballer for a Jamaica National Premier League club and also captained the Jamaica national football team. He was president of the Jamaica Amateur Swimming Association and the Jamaica Boxing Board of Control, and later formed Jamaica's first bobsleigh team.

Barnes was a huge squash and football fan who encouraged his son, John, to pursue sports, having named him after Welsh footballer John Charles.

Barnes was promoted to Colonel in 1973 and was appointed Defence adviser to the High Commission of Jamaica, London where he served from 1976 to 1981. He retired from the army in 1989.
