= Peter Beardsley =

English footballer (born 1961)

Peter Beardsley MBE
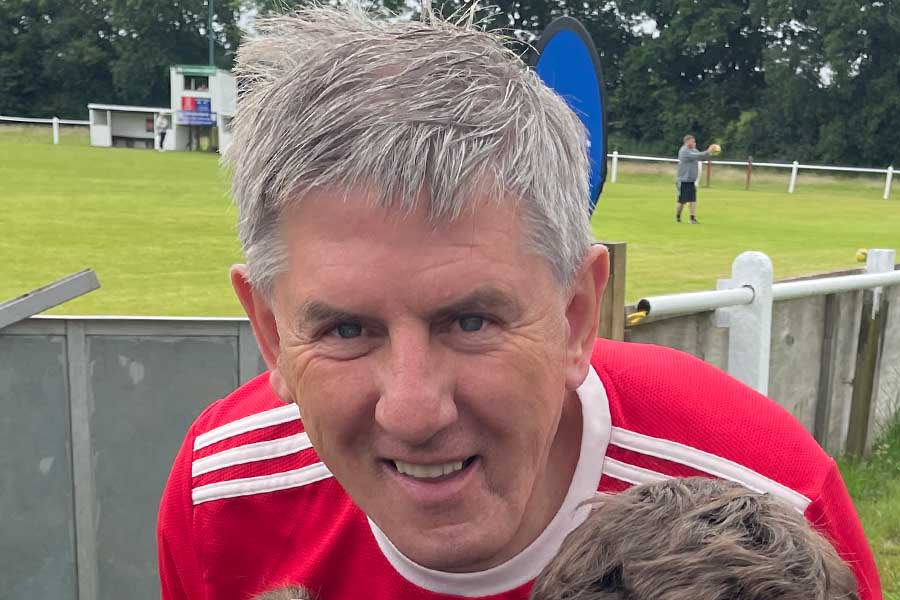
- Beardsley in June 2022

Personal information
- Full name: Peter Andrew Beardsley
- Date of birth: 18 January 1961 (age 65)
- Place of birth: Hexham, Northumberland, England
- Height: 5 ft 8 in (1.73 m)
- Positions: Forward; midfielder

Youth career
- Newcastle United
- Wallsend Boys Club

Senior career*
Years	Team	Apps	(Gls)
1979–1982	Carlisle United	104	(22)
1981	Vancouver Whitecaps	26	(13)
1982	Vancouver Whitecaps	22	(7)
1982–1983	Manchester United	0	(0)
1983	Vancouver Whitecaps	25	(8)
1983–1987	Newcastle United	147	(61)
1987–1991	Liverpool	131	(46)
1991–1993	Everton	81	(25)
1993–1997	Newcastle United	129	(47)
1997–1998	Bolton Wanderers	17	(2)
1998	→ Manchester City (loan)	6	(0)
1998	→ Fulham (loan)	22	(6)
1998	Fulham	1	(0)
1998–1999	Hartlepool United	22	(2)
1999	Melbourne Knights	2	(0)
Total		735	(239)

International career
1991–1992	England B	2	(0)
1986–1996	England	59	(9)

Managerial career
- 1999–2000: England (assistant)
- 2001–2011: Newcastle United Reserves
- 2010: Newcastle United (caretaker)
- 2014–2018: Newcastle United Reserves
- 2015: Newcastle United (assistant)
- * Club domestic league appearances and goals

Peter Andrew Beardsley MBE (born 18 January 1961) is an English football coach and former footballer who played as a forward or midfielder.

In 1987, he set a record transfer fee in the English game. He represented his country 59 times between 1986 and 1996, once as captain, taking part in two FIFA World Cups (1986 and 1990) and UEFA Euro 1988. At club level, he played for Newcastle United, Liverpool and Everton resulting in over 200 Premier League appearances. Over the course of his career, he also had spells with Carlisle United, Manchester United, Vancouver Whitecaps, Bolton Wanderers, Manchester City, Fulham, Hartlepool United and the Melbourne Knights.

Between 2001 and 2018, he worked in various coaching roles at Newcastle United, varying from the first team to the youth academy. In 2010, he was briefly appointed as the caretaker manager.

== Club career ==
=== Early career ===
As a youth player, Beardsley played for Wallsend Boys Club in North Tyneside before joining Newcastle United. In 1977, Beardsley joined fellow former Wallsend Boys Club player Steve Bruce for a trial with Third Division club Gillingham. Although Gillingham signed Bruce as an apprentice, they turned Beardsley away. He also had unsuccessful trials with Burnley and Cambridge United.

Beardsley eventually began his professional career with Carlisle United in 1978. He managed 22 goals in 104 league games, helping them win promotion to the Second Division at the end of the 1981–82 season.

During 1981–83, he played three seasons in the North American Soccer League at Canadian club Vancouver Whitecaps then joined Manchester United, although his period at United was unsuccessful, making only one single appearance in a League Cup tie against AFC Bournemouth, and otherwise failing to break into the first team. Eventually in September 1983, he was signed back to Newcastle United.

=== Newcastle United ===
On 23 September 1983, Beardsley signed for Second Division Newcastle United for a fee of £150,000. He made his debut for the Magpies a day later in the 1–1 draw with Barnsley at Oakwell. Beardsley was an instant hit with the Newcastle supporters, scoring and setting up spectacular goals. He went on to celebrate promotion with his teammates, who were captained by Kevin Keegan in his final season as a player. They finished in the final promotion spot behind winners Chelsea and runners-up Sheffield Wednesday. He scored 20 league goals that season and formed an exciting strike partnership with former England striker Keegan, who had also won major honours with Liverpool. Beardsley scored his first goal for the Magpies on 19 October 1983 in their 2–0 victory over Cardiff City at Ninian Park. His first goals at St James' Park came in Newcastle's next fixture, against Manchester City. United beat City 5–0 and Beardsley scored his first ever hat-trick.

In his first season in the First Division, Beardsley scored 17 goals in 38 league games as Newcastle finished in 14th position. These included a hat-trick on New Year's Day in a 3–1 home win over local rivals Sunderland, who finished the season relegated. During the following campaign, he played in all of Newcastle's 42 league matches, scoring 19 goals. In one fixture against West Ham United, Beardsley ended the game as a stand-in goalkeeper. The game ended in an 8–1 defeat for Newcastle, with Beardsley conceding the last three goals.

After returning from the 1986 FIFA World Cup, Beardsley helped a struggling Newcastle to avoid relegation in the 1986–87 season, eventually finishing 17th. He scored just five goals in 36 appearances that season, winning a further six caps for his country, before Liverpool manager Kenny Dalglish made a national record £1.9 million offer to Newcastle for Beardsley's services. Manager Willie McFaul accepted the offer and Beardsley was on his way to Merseyside after four seasons on Tyneside which had brought a total of a 61 goals (all in the league), his transfer completed on 14 July 1987.

12 years later, Manchester United manager Alex Ferguson revealed in his autobiography that he had made a £2 million bid for Beardsley, but McFaul had rejected the offer and told him that he wouldn't sell the player even if Ferguson offered £3 million.

=== Liverpool ===
Beardsley joined Liverpool at the same time as John Barnes, the Watford winger. They were added to John Aldridge, who had signed during the previous campaign, with the three playing against Arsenal on Beardsley's debut at Highbury on the opening day of the 1987–88 season, 15 August 1987. Aldridge scored after just nine minutes, Liverpool went on to win 2–1, and this shaped the rest of the season for the Reds. The new-look striker partnership of Beardsley and Aldridge took over from the long-standing partnership of Dalglish and Ian Rush, which was arguably the most successful partnership in English football during the 1980s. Rush had departed to Serie A club Juventus, while player-manager Dalglish had decided only to make occasional first-team appearances after the 1986-87 season, finally retiring as a player in August 1990.

Beardsley's first goal for his new club came on 29 August 1987 in the 4–1 victory over Coventry City at Highfield Road, with Beardsley scoring in the 83rd minute. He helped Liverpool to a record-equalling 29-match unbeaten start to the league as Liverpool convincingly strolled to the League title with just two defeats to their name. However, there was disappointment at the end when Wimbledon denied them the 'double' with a shock 1–0 win in the 1988 FA Cup final, a game in which Beardsley found the net, only for it to be ruled out by the referee who awarded Liverpool a free-kick for an earlier foul instead of allowing play to continue. Wimbledon scored the only goal of the game from a looping header by Lawrie Sanchez. Aldridge missed a penalty for Liverpool in the second half. Beardsley scored 15 league goals in his first season for Liverpool, level with John Barnes as the club's second highest scorer, behind Aldridge.

Rush rejoined the club in the 1988 close season and Liverpool returned to Wembley and won the FA Cup the following year, but lost their League championship with virtually the last kick of the last game of the season against Arsenal. Although Rush missed 14 games due to injury, when all three of Liverpool's strikers were fit, Dalglish played with a 4–3–3 formation that allowed Beardsley, Aldridge and Rush to play alongside each other when possible. Beardsley scored 11 league goals that season.

In April 1989, after the Hillsborough disaster claimed the lives of 96 Liverpool fans, Beardsley was among many Liverpool stars left distraught by the tragedy, attending several funerals and visiting the injured in hospital. He was part of the team that won the FA Cup that season with a 3–2 win over neighbours Everton at Wembley Stadium, though the league title slipped away on the final day of the season when Liverpool conceded a last minute goal to champions Arsenal at Anfield.

With the departure of Aldridge a few weeks into the 1989–90 season, Dalglish reverted to a 4–4–2 formation with Beardsley and Rush as his main strikers, with Beardsley scoring 10 goals in 29 games. Liverpool won the championship again that season, but the arrival of Israeli international striker Ronny Rosenthal saw his first-team opportunities limited in the title run-in, in which Liverpool overcame a strong challenge by Aston Villa to finish champions by a nine-point margin. Despite UEFA lifting the ban on English clubs in European competitions for the 1990–91 season, Liverpool were unable to compete in the European Cup as (being the team present at the Heysel disaster that had sparked the ban in 1985) they had to serve an extra year of the ban before being allowed to play in European competitions again.

Beardsley suffered another blow to his first team chances in January 1991 when Kenny Dalglish signed David Speedie. Dalglish stepped down the following month and was replaced a few weeks later by former Liverpool player Graeme Souness, after Ronnie Moran spent two months in charge on an interim basis. Beardsley managed 27 games that campaign and scored 11 goals – three of them in a 4–0 league win over Manchester United on 16 September 1990, and a further two in the Merseyside derby against Everton a week later.

Beardsley's final league goal for the Reds came on 17 November 1990, when he scored the only goal in a 1–0 win at Coventry City. By this relatively early stage of the season he had scored an impressive 11 times in the league, but a failure to add any more goals over the Christmas period may have played a part in Dalglish's decision to sign another striker in the new year. His final competitive goals for Liverpool came in a dramatic fifth round FA Cup first replay against Everton at Goodison Park on 20 February 1991, which ended in a 4–4 draw and was the club's last game before the sudden resignation of manager Dalglish, who by the end of the season had been succeeded by Graeme Souness.

Liverpool were top of the league at this stage, but in the new year were overhauled by Arsenal and the title went to Highbury at the end of the season. And with the arrival of Dean Saunders for a national record fee of £2.9 million after the end of the season, Beardsley's days at Anfield were looking even more numbered, despite the sale of Speedie. During Beardsley's Anfield career he played in 175 matches and scored 59 goals, winning two league titles and an FA Cup, but it was his vision, guile and all action style of play that endeared him to the Anfield faithful, so much so he was voted in 19th position in the 2006 poll 100 Players Who Shook The Kop, conducted by the Liverpool Football Club web site; over 110,000 supporters worldwide voted for their 10 favourite players of all time.

=== Everton ===
Liverpool's derby rivals, Everton succeeded in gaining 30-year-old Beardsley's signature when he joined them on 5 August 1991 for a fee of £1 million. He made his debut on 17 August in a 2–1 defeat to Nottingham Forest at the City Ground. Beardsley scored 25 goals in 81 appearances for the blue half of Merseyside, though Everton did not achieve anything greater than a mid table finish in the league during his time there, and failed to make an impact in the cup competitions.

While at Everton he became – along with David Johnson – one of only two players to have scored for both sides in Merseyside derbies. He finished as the club's top scorer by the end of his first season at Goodison Park and again showed his dynamic quality during his second season, but off the field Everton were suffering financial difficulties and when former club Newcastle United offered Everton £1.5 million for Beardsley, it was a sum they could not turn down for a 32-year-old player. In all competitions, Beardsley scored 32 goals in 95 appearances for Everton.

=== Return to Newcastle United ===
On 16 July 1993, Beardsley rejoined Newcastle United for £1.5 million, where his old teammate and strike partner Kevin Keegan was now manager. Newcastle had just won promotion to the Premier League as First Division champions, and in 1993–94 they finished third and qualified for the UEFA Cup, with Beardsley scoring a total of 25 goals and his strike-partner Andy Cole scoring a club record of 41 goals in all competitions. He played for a further four years at the club, almost captaining them to the Premier League title in 1996, but they were pipped to the title by Manchester United. They finished runners-up a year later as well, although 1996–97 was a trying season for the club as they failed to set the pace at the top of the table as they had the previous season, and halfway through the season Keegan had stunned the club with his resignation, with Kenny Dalglish then succeeding him.

During his second spell at St James' Park, he racked up 157 appearances and scored 56 goals, bringing his overall total after two spells with the club to 321 appearances and 117 goals. This equates to a goal every 2.74 matches, a decent ratio for a player who was seen by many as a provider rather than a goalscorer, particularly in the 1996–97 season when he was switched to midfield following Alan Shearer's arrival. It is this period of his career that Beardsley regards as the time when he peaked.

=== Later career and retirement ===
Beardsley left Newcastle for the second time on 18 August 1997 for £450,000, joining Bolton Wanderers, where he made 21 appearances but was unable to save them from being relegated from the Premier League just one season after promotion. He then went on loan to Manchester City, where he played six times in the First Division. This loan spell made Beardsley the only player to play for both top-flight teams in Liverpool and Manchester.

He then moved to Fulham who were managed by his former manager Keegan, where he made 28 appearances in two separate loan spells, eventually signing for them permanently. He then went to Hartlepool United on a free transfer, and played 22 times in the Third Division to secure their Football League status. He finally ended his career at the age of 38 when he played twice for the National Soccer League club Melbourne Knights.

In a professional career totalling some 20 years in English football, he managed 659 league games and 210 goals, and a total of 799 games and 238 goals in all competitions. He had collected three major trophies (all of them with Liverpool) and was capped 59 times by England, scoring nine times. He had also played in two promotion winning teams earlier in his career, although he had been sold by Carlisle just before they sealed promotion in 1982.

During the 2012–13 season, Beardsley played in a friendly for Cambridge United against the Newcastle United reserve squad to celebrate Cambridge's 100th anniversary since they were founded.

== International career ==
After reaching the First Division with Newcastle, Beardsley became a regular in the England side in the second half of the 1980s, and teamed up with striker Gary Lineker, who described Beardsley as "the best partner I could ever have".

On 29 January 1986, Beardsley made his debut for his country, coming on as a substitute for Lineker in the 4–0 friendly victory over Egypt in Cairo. His first goal came in his fourth appearance, on 17 May 1986 in the 3–0 friendly win over Mexico in Los Angeles, as England prepared for the forthcoming World Cup in Mexico. England scored seven goals in the tournament, of which Lineker scored six (winning the Golden Boot for doing so); the other goal came from Beardsley in a 3–0 victory over Paraguay in the second round. England had failed to score a goal in the first two matches of the finals, but in the third match – Beardsley's first start in the tournament – they beat Poland 3–0. Beardsley contributed in that match with a spectacular cross to Steve Hodge, which allowed Hodge to make England's second goal for Lineker. The next match was to be the famous Argentina vs. England match, in which Diego Maradona scored twice for the 2–1 victory that saw England eliminated from the tournament. Beardsley played the full game and was one of the five players passed by Maradona for the "Goal of the Century".

He maintained his place in the England team and featured in both Euro 88 and the 1990 World Cup. He was named as England captain on 17 February 1988 when they drew 0–0 in a friendly with Israel.

Beardsley was dropped by England manager Graham Taylor after the end of 1990, around the same time he lost his regular place in the Liverpool line-up, and, controversially, continued to be overlooked by him despite England's disappointing performance at Euro 92 as well as their unsuccessful attempt to qualify for the 1994 World Cup. Beardsley, meanwhile, was performing very well for his new club Everton, having signed for them in August 1991, although Everton's form as a team was far from impressive.

During his second spell at Newcastle, Beardsley was recalled to the England team by new manager Terry Venables in early 1994 after an absence of three years, and ultimately ended his international career while still at Newcastle in 1996, when he was one of the three players dropped from the provisional squad of 25 for the final squad of 22 for Euro 96, along with Dennis Wise and Jason Wilcox, after gaining 59 caps and scoring nine goals.

Beardsley once scored four goals for England against Aylesbury United. These did not count towards his international tally, however, as this was not an official international match. Aylesbury became the only non-League side to face the full England team, as they hosted the national side in a warm-up match in 1988 in preparation for the European Championships. England won the game 7–0.

== Style of play ==
A small and skilful second striker, Beardsley was recognised more for close control, deceptive movement and combination play than for prolific goalscoring. Often used as a classic number 10, he connected midfield and attack with intelligent movement and passing, providing an extra presence between the lines. Beardsley has been described by the National Football Museum website as "a unique talent in English football." At Liverpool he frequently dropped deeper to supply chances for teammates such as John Aldridge and John Barnes, acting as the "creative force" in a fluid front line that won two First Division titles and an FA Cup. For England he served as an unselfish foil to Gary Lineker—Lineker later recalled that the pair "knew each other's games perfectly." He also noted that Beardsley was effectively England's first recognised number 10 at the 1986 FIFA World Cup, when manager Bobby Robson adopted the system to strengthen the midfield. Managers credited his role with making England's football "more fluid and attractive". Contemporary reports praised his work-rate off the ball, pressing and recovering possession, along with his vision to play incisive final passes. This balance of industry and imagination made him a supporter favourite across several clubs.

== Coaching career ==
Beardsley joined the coaching staff at Newcastle United after his playing career was over. In early 1999, Beardsley also served as assistant manager to Howard Wilkinson during his first caretaker period as manager of England, between the dismissal of Glenn Hoddle and the appointment of Kevin Keegan. England faced – and lost to – world champions France in a friendly at Wembley. In 2003, Beardsley was the subject of a Premier League inquiry, after it was claimed that he had bullied two Newcastle youth players. He was cleared of the charges. Bullying allegations were again raised against Beardsley in January 2018.

Beardsley left Newcastle in 2006, when Glenn Roeder took over as permanent manager of the club. He believed Newcastle should go in a different direction. Beardsley then worked in a media role at the club. In 2007, Howard Kendall, his former boss at Everton stated he was interested in taking over as manager of Republic of Ireland national team, with Beardsley as his assistant manager. Beardsley was also linked with a return to Newcastle in January 2008, when Keegan returned as manager for a second spell.

In March 2009, Beardsley was re-appointed as an academy coach at Newcastle, working primarily with young strikers. On 27 July 2010, he was appointed as reserve team manager, with Steve Stone as his assistant manager. On 6 December, following the dismissal of Chris Hughton, Beardsley was briefly placed in charge of the team on a temporary basis before Alan Pardew was brought in as Hughton's replacement.

In January 2018, Beardsley was placed on leave by Newcastle following allegations of racism. In March 2019, Newcastle confirmed that he had left the club, and the Football Association later confirmed they were investigating him. He was subsequently charged with three counts of using racist language to players. In September 2019, he was suspended from all football-related activity for 32 weeks after being found guilty by the FA of making racist comments to players. Beardsley said he was "surprised and disappointed" at being found guilty. The FA panel said: "Even if he did not intend to do so, he plainly did cause offence." However, the panel said it did not believe Beardsley was racist, stating: "We are satisfied that Mr Beardsley is not a racist in the sense of being ill-disposed to persons on grounds of their race or ethnicity."

== Personal life ==
Born in Hexham, Beardsley grew up in Forest Hall, Newcastle upon Tyne.

Beardsley has been married since 1981 to his wife Sandra. They have a son, Drew (born 1989), and a daughter, Stacey (born 1993).

== In other media ==
A football game bearing Beardsley's name, Peter Beardsley's International Football, was released for 8-bit computers in 1988 to a mostly negative reception.

== Career statistics ==
=== Club ===
Appearances and goals by club, season and competition
Club	Season	League			FA Cup		League Cup		Continental		Other		Total	
Club	Season	Division	Apps	Goals	Apps	Goals	Apps	Goals	Apps	Goals	Apps	Goals	Apps	Goals
Carlisle United	1979–80	Third Division	39	8	4	1	0	0	—		—		43	9
Carlisle United	1980–81	Third Division	43	10	7	5	6	0	—		—		56	15
Carlisle United	1981–82	Third Division	22	4	4	1	3	0	—		—		29	5
Carlisle United	Total		104	22	15	7	9	0	—		—		128	29
Vancouver Whitecaps	1981	NASL	26	13	—		—		—		—		26	13
Vancouver Whitecaps	1982	NASL	22	7	—		—		—		—		22	7
Vancouver Whitecaps	1983	NASL	25	8	—		—						25	8
Vancouver Whitecaps	Total		73	28	—		—		—		—		73	28
Manchester United	1982–83	First Division	0	0	0	0	1	0	0	0	—		1	0
Newcastle United	1983–84	Second Division	35	20	1	0	2	0	—		—		38	20
Newcastle United	1984–85	First Division	38	17	2	0	4	0	—		—		44	17
Newcastle United	1985–86	First Division	42	19	1	0	2	0	—		—		45	19
Newcastle United	1986–87	First Division	32	5	2	0	3	0	—		—		37	5
Newcastle United	Total		147	61	6	0	11	0	—		—		164	61
Liverpool	1987–88	First Division	38	15	7	3	3	0	—		0	0	48	18
Liverpool	1988–89	First Division	37	10	5	2	6	0	—		3 (Note: Two appearances and in Football League Centenary Trophy, one appearance in Charity Shield)	0	51	12
Liverpool	1989–90	First Division	29	10	8	4	3	1	—		1 (Note: Appearances in Charity Shield)	1	41	16
Liverpool	1990–91	First Division	27	11	5	2	2	0	—		1	0	35	13
Liverpool	Total		131	46	25	11	14	1	—		5	1	175	59
Everton	1991–92	First Division	42	15	2	1	4	3	—		2 (Note: Appearances in Full Members' Cup)	1	50	20
Everton	1992–93	Premier League	39	10	2	0	4	2	—		—		45	12
Everton	Total		81	25	4	1	8	5	—		2	1	95	32
Newcastle United	1993–94	Premier League	35	21	3	2	3	1	—		—		41	24
Newcastle United	1994–95	Premier League	34	13	3	0	3	0	4 (Note: Appearances in UEFA Cup)	2	—		44	15
Newcastle United	1995–96	Premier League	35	8	2	1	3	2	—		—		40	11
Newcastle United	1996–97	Premier League	25	5	3	0	2	1	6	2	1	0	37	8
Newcastle United	Total		129	47	11	3	11	4	10	4	1	0	162	58
Bolton Wanderers	1997–98	Premier League	17	2	1	0	3	0	—		—		21	2
Manchester City (loan)	1997–98	First Division	6	0	0	0	0	0	—		—		6	0
Fulham (loan)	1997–98	Second Division	10	3	0	0	0	0	—		—		10	3
Fulham (loan)	1998–99	Second Division	12	3	0	0	5	1	—		—		17	4
Fulham	1998–99	Second Division	1	0	—		—		—		—		1	0
Fulham	Total		23	6	0	0	5	1	—		—		28	7
Hartlepool United	1998–99	Third Division	22	2	0	0	—		—		2 (Note: Appearances in EFL Trophy)	0	24	2
Hartlepool United	1999–2000	Third Division	0	0	0	0	0	0	—		—		0	0
Hartlepool United	Total		22	2	0	0	0	0	—		2	0	24	2
Melbourne Knights	1999–2000	NSL	2	0	—		—		—		—		2	0
Career total			735	239	62	22	62	11	10	4	10	2	879	278

=== International ===
Appearances and goals by national team and year
National team	Year	Apps	Goals
England	1986	11	2
England	1987	7	2
England	1988	11	1
England	1989	8	2
England	1990	10	1
England	1991	2	0
England	1992	0	0
England	1993	0	0
England	1994	4	1
England	1995	5	0
England	1996	1	0
Total		59	9

Scores and results list England's goal tally first, score column indicates score after each Beardsley goal.

List of international goals scored by Peter Beardsley
No.	Date	Venue	Opponent	Score	Result	Competition
1	17 May 1986	Los Angeles Memorial Coliseum, Los Angeles, United States	Mexico	3–0	3–0	Friendly
2	18 June 1986	Estadio Azteca, Mexico City, Mexico	Paraguay	2–0	3–0	1986 FIFA World Cup
3	14 October 1987	Wembley Stadium, London, England	Turkey	2–0	3–0	UEFA Euro 1988 qualifier
4	11 November 1987	Red Star Stadium, Belgrade, Yugoslavia	Yugoslavia	1–0	4–1	UEFA Euro 1988 qualifier
5	21 May 1988	Wembley Stadium, London, England	Scotland	1–0	1–0	1988 Rous Cup
6	26 April 1989	Wembley Stadium, London, England	Albania	2–0	5–0	1990 FIFA World Cup qualifier
7	26 April 1989	Wembley Stadium, London, England	Albania	3–0	5–0	1990 FIFA World Cup qualifier
8	17 October 1990	Wembley Stadium, London, England	Poland	2–0	2–0	UEFA Euro 1992 qualifier
9	17 May 1994	Wembley Stadium, London, England	Greece	1–0	5–0	Friendly

== Honours ==
Liverpool

- Football League First Division: 1987–88, 1989–90
- FA Cup: 1988–89; runner-up: 1987–88
- FA Charity Shield: 1988, 1989, 1990 (shared)

England

- Rous Cup: 1986, 1988, 1989

Individual

- Newcastle United Player of the Year: 1984–85, 1985–86
- North-East FWA Player of the Year: 1986, 1994
- PFA Team of the Year: 1986–87 First Division, 1987–88 First Division, 1989–90 First Division, 1993–94 Premier League
- English Football Hall of Fame inducted in 2007
