= 1981–82 Carlisle United F.C. season =

Carlisle United F.C.
1981–82 season
- Manager: Bob Stokoe
- Stadium: Brunton Park
- Third Division: 2nd (promoted)
- FA Cup: Third round
- League Cup: Second round
- Football League Group Cup: Group stage

For the 1981–82 season, Carlisle United F.C. competed in Football League Division Three.

== Results & fixtures ==
=== Football League Third Division ===
==== League table ====
Pos	Team	Pld	W	D	L	GF	GA	GD	Pts	Promotion or relegation
1	Burnley	46	21	17	8	66	45	+21	80	Division Champions, promoted
2	Carlisle United	46	23	11	12	65	50	+15	80	Promoted
3	Fulham	46	21	15	10	77	51	+26	78	Promoted
4	Lincoln City	46	21	14	11	66	40	+26	77	
5	Oxford United	46	19	14	13	63	49	+14	71	

Source: rsssf.com (incorrect), source=11v11.com

==== Matches ====
Match Day	Date	Opponent	H/A	Score	Carlisle United Scorer(s)	Attendance
1	29 August	Bristol City	H	2–2		
2	5 September	Exeter City	A	1–2		
3	12 September	Southend United	H	3–2		
4	19 September	Lincoln City	A	0–0		
5	22 September	Chesterfield	A	0–1		
6	26 September	Oxford United	H	2–1		
7	29 September	Burnley	H	1–0		
8	3 October	Brentford	A	2–1		
9	10 October	Swindon Town	A	1–2		
10	17 October	Plymouth Argyle	H	3–1		
11	20 October	Huddersfield Town	A	1–2		
12	24 October	Walsall	H	2–1		
13	31 October	Newport County	A	0–2		
14	3 November	Doncaster Rovers	H	2–0		
15	7 November	Fulham	H	1–2		
16	14 November	Portsmouth	A	2–1		
17	28 November	Gillingham	H	2–0		
18	5 December	Millwall	A	2–1		
19	19 December	Bristol Rovers	A	1–0		
20	30 January	Lincoln City	H	1–0		
21	2 February	Preston North End	H	1–0		
22	6 February	Southend United	A	1–1		
23	9 February	Chesterfield	H	3–0		
24	13 February	Brentford	H	1–0		
25	20 February	Oxford United	A	1–2		
26	27 February	Swindon Town	H	1–1		
27	6 March	Plymouth Argyle	A	0–1		
28	9 March	Huddersfield Town	H	2–2		
29	13 March	Walsall	A	1–1		
30	16 March	Doncaster Rovers	A	1–1		
31	20 March	Newport County	H	2–2		
32	23 March	Reading	H	2–1		
33	27 March	Fulham	A	1–4		
34	3 April	Portsmouth	H	2–0		
35	6 April	Bristol City	A	1–1		
36	10 April	Preston North End	A	1–0		
37	13 April	Chester	H	3–0		
38	17 April	Millwall	H	2–1		
39	20 April	Exeter City	H	3–2		
40	24 April	Gillingham	A	0–0		
41	1 May	Wimbledon	H	2–1		
42	4 May	Burnley	A	0–1		
43	8 May	Reading	A	2–2		
44	11 May	Wimbledon	A	1–3		
45	15 May	Bristol Rovers	H	1–2		
46	19 May	Chester	A	1–0		

=== Football League Cup ===
Round	Date	Opponent	H/A	Score	Carlisle United Scorer(s)	Attendance
R1 L1	1 September	Bury	A	3–3		
R1 L2	15 September	Bury	H	2–1 (aet)		
R2 L1	6 October	Bristol City	H	0–0		
R2 L2	27 October	Bristol City	A	1–2		

=== FA Cup ===
Round	Date	Opponent	H/A	Score	Carlisle United Scorer(s)	Attendance
R1	21 November	Darlington	A	2–2		
R1 R	24 November	Darlington	H	3–1		
R2	9 January	Bishop Auckland	H	1–0		
R3	23 January	Huddersfield Town	H	2–3		

=== Football League Group Cup ===
Round	Date	Opponent	H/A	Score	Carlisle United Scorer(s)	Attendance
GS	15 August	Burnley	A	2–4		
GS	18 August	Blackpool	H	1–0		
GS	22 August	Preston North End	H	3–0		
