= 1980–81 Carlisle United F.C. season =

Carlisle United F.C.
1980–81 season
- Manager: Martin Harvey (to September); Bob Stokoe (from September)
- Stadium: Brunton Park
- Third Division: 19th
- FA Cup: Fourth round
- League Cup: Second round
- Anglo-Scottish Cup: Group stage

For the 1980–81 season, Carlisle United F.C. competed in Football League Division Three.

== Results & fixtures ==
=== Football League Third Division ===
==== League table ====
Pos	Team	Pld	W	D	L	GF	GA	GD	Pts	Promotion or relegation
17	Swindon Town	46	13	15	18	51	56	−5	41	
18	Chester	46	15	11	20	38	48	−10	41	
19	Carlisle United	46	14	13	19	56	70	−14	41	
20	Walsall	46	13	15	18	59	74	−15	41	
21	Sheffield United	46	14	12	20	65	63	+2	40	Relegated

Source: rsssf.com

==== Matches ====
Match Day	Date	Opponent	H/A	Score	Carlisle United Scorer(s)	Attendance
1	16 August	Sheffield United	H	0–3		
2	19 August	Huddersfield Town	A	1–1		
3	23 August	Chester	A	0–1		
4	30 August	Newport County	H	1–4		
5	6 September	Plymouth Argyle	A	1–4		
6	13 September	Gillingham	H	0–0		
7	16 September	Millwall	H	2–1		
8	20 September	Oxford United	A	2–1		
9	27 September	Chesterfield	H	2–6		
10	30 September	Millwall	A	0–3		
11	4 October	Walsall	A	3–4		
12	7 October	Barnsley	H	2–2		
13	11 October	Brentford	H	1–2		
14	18 October	Swindon Town	A	1–1		
15	21 October	Hull City	A	1–0		
16	28 October	Blackpool	H	2–0		
17	1 November	Portsmouth	A	1–2		
18	4 November	Barnsley	A	1–3		
19	8 November	Fulham	H	2–2		
20	11 November	Huddersfield Town	H	1–1		
21	15 November	Sheffield United	A	2–2		
22	29 November	Exeter City	A	0–2		
23	6 December	Colchester United	H	4–0		
24	20 December	Charlton Athletic	A	1–2		
25	26 December	Burnley	H	3–2		
26	27 December	Rotherham United	A	0–3		
27	10 January	Reading	A	1–3		
28	31 January	Chester	H	3–0		
29	7 February	Gillingham	A	1–0		
30	10 February	Reading	H	0–0		
31	14 February	Plymouth Argyle	H	2–0		
32	21 February	Chesterfield	A	0–1		
33	28 February	Oxford United	H	0–0		
34	7 March	Walsall	H	1–1		
35	14 March	Brentford	A	1–1		
36	17 March	Swindon Town	H	2–1		
37	21 March	Hull City	H	2–0		
38	28 March	Blackpool	A	1–0		
39	31 March	Exeter City	H	1–1		
40	4 April	Portsmouth	H	0–0		
41	11 April	Fulham	A	3–2		
42	18 April	Rotherham United	H	0–1		
43	21 April	Burnley	A	3–0		
44	25 April	Charlton Athletic	H	1–2		
45	2 May	Colchester United	A	0–1		
46	5 May	Newport County	A	0–4		

=== Football League Cup ===
Round	Date	Opponent	H/A	Score	Carlisle United Scorer(s)	Attendance
R1 L1	9 August	Rochdale	H	2–0		
R1 L2	12 August	Rochdale	A	1–1		
R2 L1	26 August	Charlton Athletic	H	1–2		
R2 L2	27 October	Charlton Athletic	A	1–2		

=== FA Cup ===
Round	Date	Opponent	H/A	Score	Carlisle United Scorer(s)	Attendance
R1	22 November	Workington	A	0–0		
R1 R	1 December	Workington	H	4–1		
R2	13 December	Walsall	H	3–0		
R3	3 January	Mansfield Town	A	2–2		
R3 R	6 January	Mansfield Town	H	2–1		
R4	24 January	Bristol City	H	1–1		
R4 R	28 January	Bristol City	A	0–5		

=== Anglo-Scottish Cup ===
Round	Date	Opponent	H/A	Score	Carlisle United Scorer(s)	Attendance
GS	30 July	Preston North End	A	0–0		
GS	2 August	Blackpool	H	1–2		
GS	5 August	Blackburn Rovers	H	1–4		
