= Wembley International Tournament =

The Wembley International Tournament, known as the Makita International Tournament for sponsorship reasons from 1989, was an association football pre-season friendly tournament held annually in England, between 1988 and 1994.

Originally organised by IEP Tournaments, it was first staged in August 1988, with Arsenal beating A.C. Milan in the final. All the matches were held at Wembley Stadium. Typically, it hosted a combination of English and Continental teams, and was held at Wembley until 1991. Thereafter, it was held at different venues around the country until the final competition in 1994. It was televised in all years by ITV.

== Winners ==
Arsenal and Sampdoria were the record winners of the trophy, each winning three times. The only other team to win it was Chelsea.

Year	Winner	Runner-up	Third place	Fourth place	Venue
1988	(England) Arsenal	(Italy) AC Milan	(Germany) Bayern Munich	(England) Tottenham Hotspur	Wembley Stadium
1989	(England) Arsenal	(England) Liverpool	(Soviet Union) Dynamo Kyiv	(Portugal) FC Porto	Wembley Stadium
1990	(Italy) Sampdoria	(England) Arsenal	(Spain) Real Sociedad	(England) Aston Villa	Wembley Stadium
1991	(Italy) Sampdoria	(England) Arsenal	(Greece) Panathinaikos	(England) West Ham United	Highbury
1992	(Italy) Sampdoria	(England) Leeds United	(Germany) VfB Stuttgart	(England) Nottingham Forest	Elland Road
1993	(England) Chelsea	(England) Tottenham Hotspur	(Netherlands) AFC Ajax	(Italy) SS Lazio	White Hart Lane
1994	(England) Arsenal	(Italy) SSC Napoli	(England) Chelsea	(Spain) Atlético Madrid	Highbury

== See also ==
- Umbro International Tournament
