= John Barnes =

English football player and manager (born 1963)

John Barnes MBE
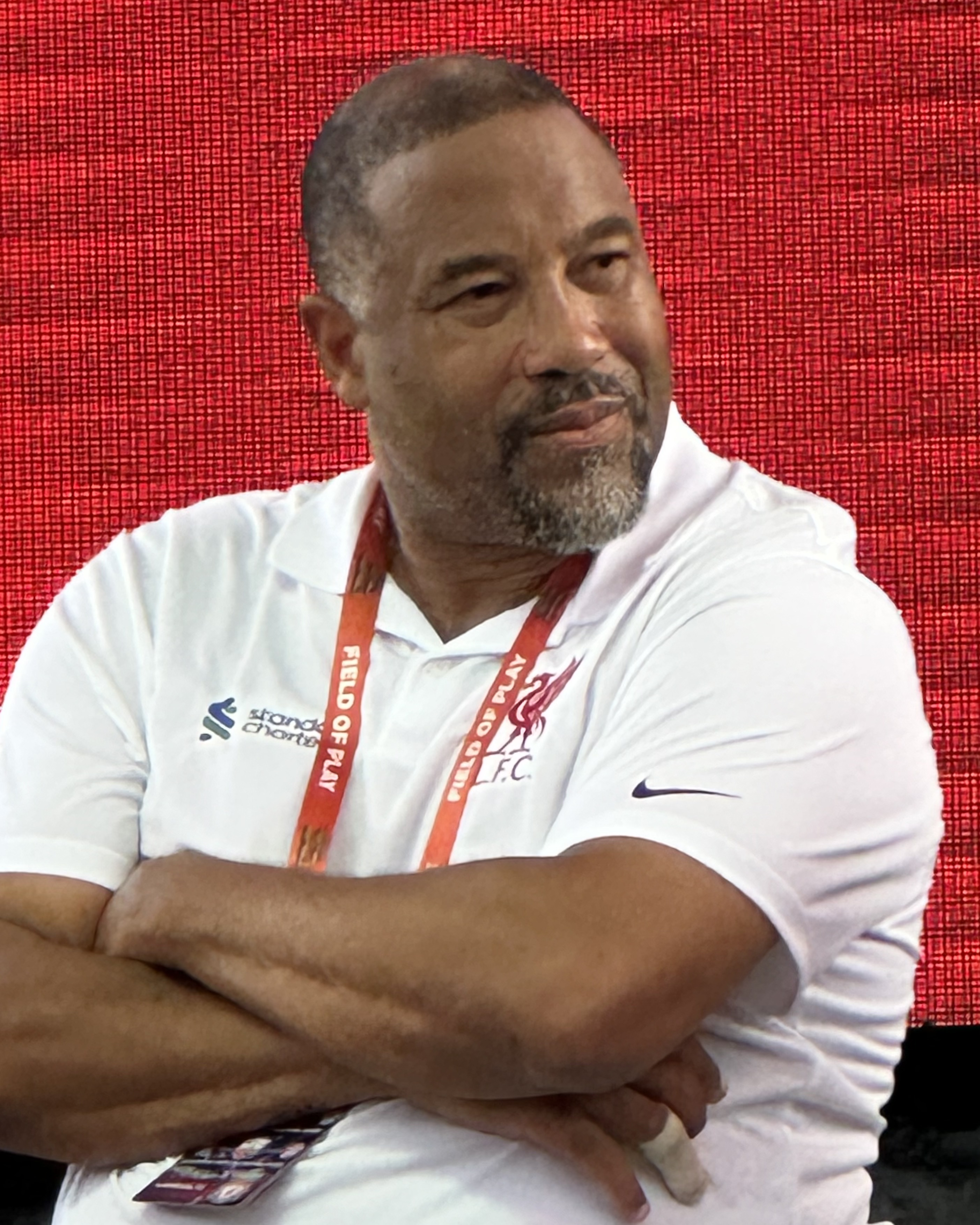
- Barnes in 2023

Personal information
- Full name: John Charles Bryan Barnes
- Date of birth: 7 November 1963 (age 63)
- Place of birth: Kingston, Jamaica
- Height: 5 ft 11 in (1.81 m)
- Position: Left winger

Youth career
- Stowe Boys Club

Senior career*
Years	Team	Apps	(Gls)
1980–1981	Sudbury Court		
1981–1987	Watford	233	(65)
1987–1997	Liverpool	314	(84)
1997–1999	Newcastle United	27	(6)
1999	Charlton Athletic	12	(0)
Total		586	(155)

International career
1982–1983	England U21	3	(0)
1983–1995	England	79	(10)

Managerial career
- 1999–2000: Celtic
- 2008–2009: Jamaica
- 2009: Tranmere Rovers
- * Club domestic league appearances and goals

John Charles Bryan Barnes (born 7 November 1963) is a former professional football player and manager. Often considered one of the greatest England players of all time and one of Liverpool's greatest ever players, Barnes works as an author, as well as a commentator and pundit for ESPN and SuperSport. Initially he was a quick and skilful left winger, then he moved to central midfield later in his career. Barnes won two League titles and two FA Cups with Liverpool. Born in Jamaica, he represented England and won 79 international caps for the England national team.

Barnes was born and raised in Jamaica as the son of a military officer from Trinidad and Tobago and a Jamaican mother. He moved to London, England, with his family when he was 12 years old. He joined Watford aged 17 in 1981, before playing 296 competitive games for them, scoring 85 goals. He debuted for England in 1983, and in 1987 joined Liverpool for £900,000. In his ten seasons there, Liverpool won the then-top-flight First Division twice and the FA Cup twice. He scored 106 goals in 403 matches. By the time of his last cap, in 1995, he had more caps than any other black England player. After two years at Newcastle United, he ended his playing career at Charlton Athletic in 1999. Barnes had eight months as Celtic head coach when his former Liverpool manager Kenny Dalglish was director of football. He has since managed the Jamaica national team, in 2008–09, and English club Tranmere Rovers, for four months in 2009.

Barnes was the PFA Players' Player of the Year once (in 1987–88) and the Football Writers' Association Footballer of the Year twice (in 1987–88 and 1989–90). In 2005, he was inducted into the English Football Hall of Fame. In 2006, in a poll of Liverpool fans' favourite players, Barnes came fifth; a year later, FourFourTwo magazine named him Liverpool's best all-time player. In 2016, The Times readers voted him England's greatest-ever left-footed player.

Barnes has published two books: John Barnes: The Autobiography (1999), which was followed by The Uncomfortable Truth About Racism (2021), both of which were met with a largely positive reception. In 2022, he returned to Liverpool as an official Club Ambassador.

== Early life ==
Barnes was born in Jamaica to Roderick Kenrick "Ken" Barnes (a Trinidadian) and Frances Jeanne Hill (a Jamaican). Ken Barnes hailed from Port of Spain, Trinidad and Tobago emigrating to Jamaica in 1956 as a member of the West India Regiment. He joined the Jamaica Defence Force when formed after the nation's 1962 independence when he was initially commanding officer of the 1st Battalion Jamaica Regiment. In 1973, he was promoted to colonel remaining in the army until retiring in 1989. While in the army, he was a semi-professional footballer for a Jamaica National Premier League club and also captained the Jamaica national football team. Barnes spent his early childhood living in Jamaica's biggest military base, playing football and living a disciplined life. His father was president of the Jamaica Amateur Swimming Association and later formed Jamaica's first bobsleigh team.

Barnes' father was a huge squash and football fan who encouraged his son to pursue sports, having named him after Welsh footballer John Charles. Ken Barnes, who was promoted to Colonel in 1973, was appointed Defence adviser to the High Commission of Jamaica, London (1976–1981), and Barnes moved to London with his family in January 1976, when he was 12 years old. He attended the rugby-playing St Marylebone Grammar School then a short stint at Haverstock School, Camden Town. While at school he played four years of youth football at the Stowe Boys Club in Paddington.

Barnes mother, Frances Jeanne Hill, was the daughter of journalist, politician and trade unionist, Frank Hill, who had been imprisoned by the Jamaican governor, Sir Arthur Richards in 1942, along with his brother Ken, after being accused of trying to overthrow the government. Jeanne herself was arrested in 1964 when she took part in a demonstration against political bias at the Jamaica Broadcasting Corporation.

== Club career ==
=== Watford ===
Barnes was noticed by Watford as a teenager while playing for Middlesex League club Sudbury Court. Following a successful trial game in Watford's reserves, Barnes signed on 14 July 1981 for the fee of a set of kits. Barnes debuted aged 17 as a substitute on 5 September 1981 in a Football League Second Division 1–1 home draw with Oldham Athletic. With manager Graham Taylor, Watford were eight months away from completing a five-year rise from the Fourth Division to the First. Barnes quickly established himself as a regular player and scored 12 Second Division goals as Watford were promoted, as runners-up to fierce rivals Luton Town to the top flight of English football at the end of season 1981–82. Watford finished runners-up for the League title to Liverpool the season after.

Watford lost the 1984 FA Cup final as under-dogs 2–0 to Everton. Watford lost a 1986–87 FA Cup semi-final to Tottenham Hotspur. At the end of the 1986–87 season, Taylor called time on his 10-year spell as Watford manager to take charge at Aston Villa. His successor, Dave Bassett, resigned to losing Barnes to a bigger club, gave Alex Ferguson the chance to sign Barnes for Manchester United. Ferguson rejected the offer still having faith in United's left winger Jesper Olsen. Ferguson later admitted that he regretted not signing Barnes, especially as Barnes helped extend Liverpool's dominance in England by three seasons, while Olsen fell out of favour at Old Trafford and had left by the end of 1988, with his successors Ralph Milne and Danny Wallace failing to live up to expectations. Ferguson's United waited until 1990 to win a major trophy and 1993 to win the league title. Barnes left Watford after scoring 65 goals in 233 league appearances.

=== Liverpool ===
"Between 1987 and 1991 Barnes was a phenomenon. His ability to beat players without appearing to change gear was a gift that only a select few players have ever been able to showcase."

— The Guardian on Barnes' first four seasons at Liverpool where he played as a winger.

Barnes arrived at Kenny Dalglish's Liverpool in the same close season as England teammate Peter Beardsley and linked up with new signings John Aldridge and Ray Houghton. He signed for the club on 9 June 1987. He debuted for the Reds along with Beardsley on 15 August in the 2–1 league win at Arsenal at Highbury. After nine minutes, Barnes and Beardsley combined to set up Aldridge to score. Barnes' first Liverpool goal was on 12 September beating Oxford United 2–0 at Anfield.

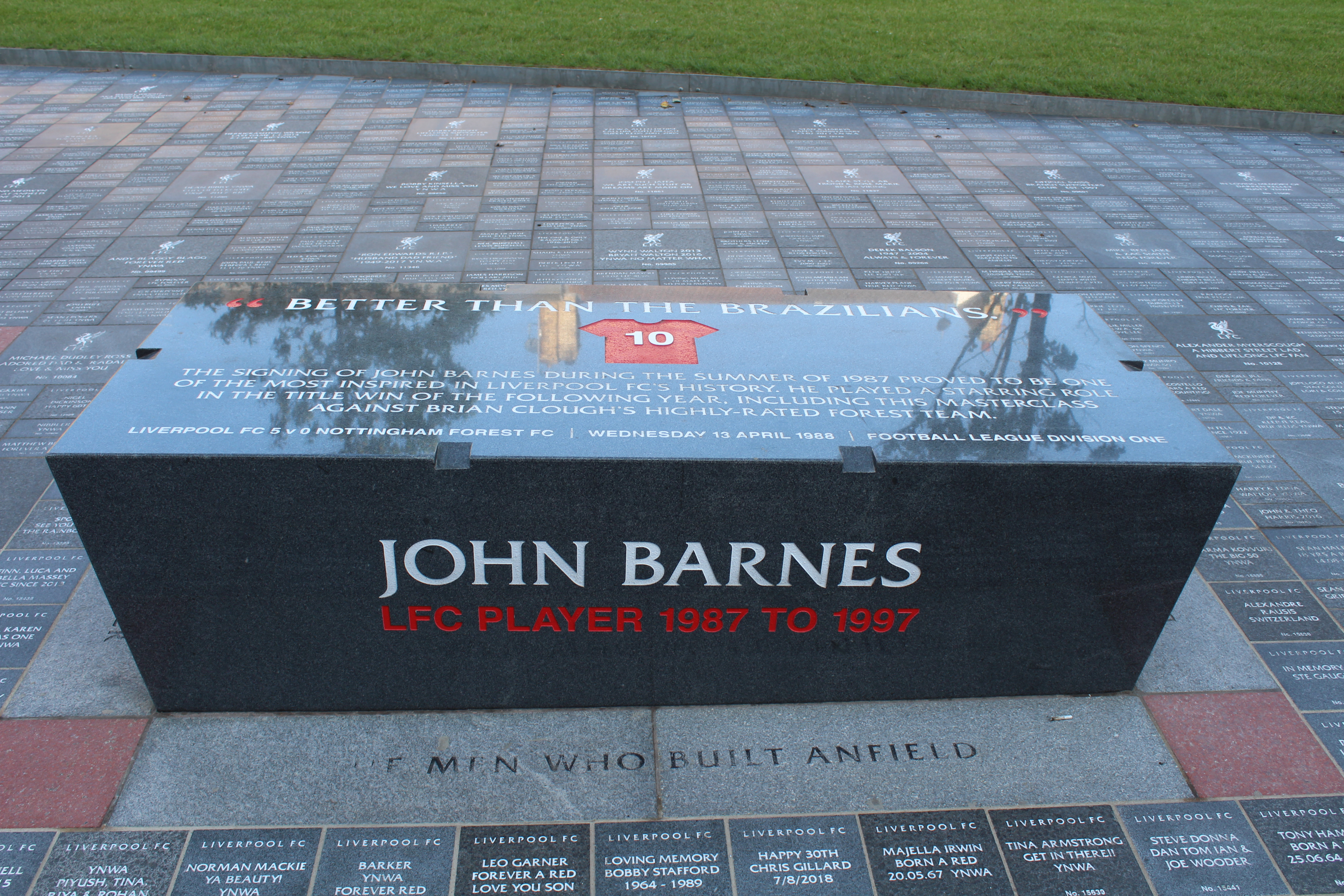
Barnes' plinth outside Anfield marking his ten years with Liverpool. The inscription commemorates his performance in the 5–0 win over Nottingham Forest in April 1988.

In Barnes' first Liverpool season, they won the League title, remaining undefeated for the first twenty-nine games of the season. Barnes' fifteen Liverpool league goals in his first season there was second only to John Aldridge. The 2–1 defeat at Nottingham Forest on 2 April was the last of only two league defeats that season. Eleven days later, Barnes, Beardsley, Houghton and Aldridge were instrumental in Liverpool's 5–0 home win over Forest described by Tom Finney as "One of the finest exhibition I've seen the whole time I've played and watched the game. You couldn't see it bettered anywhere, not even in Brazil." The double however was thwarted by Lawrie Sanchez' Wimbledon goal beating Liverpool 1–0 in the 1988 FA Cup final. Barnes was a key performer on the "Anfield Rap"; the club's cup final song that UK charted at number 3. In recognition of his stellar displays throughout the season, Barnes was voted PFA Player of the Year, finishing ahead of his Liverpool teammate Steve McMahon.

In the summer of 1988, Ian Rush re-signed for Liverpool. Following the death of 96 Liverpool fans in April 1989 as a result of the Hillsborough disaster, Barnes attended several funerals and visited the injured in hospital. He pulled out of an England international friendly in order to fulfil these public duties. Liverpool won the 1989 FA Cup final with a 3–2 victory over Merseyside rivals Everton, with Barnes creating goals from the left wing for Rush. In the 1988–89 title decider at Anfield, Arsenal's Michael Thomas' 92nd minute, league winning goal occurred in their counter-attack 17 seconds after Barnes lost ball possession attempting to dribble past Kevin Richardson.

"His blend of power and poise made him hard to pigeonhole. He wouldn't just run. He'd dangle the carrot and wait for the bite, before gliding away and then slowing down again to weigh up his options and play the perfect ball into the box. He was a forward comprised of physicality and cerebral brilliance in equal measure."

— Barnes' dribbling ability and creativity from the wing.

Barnes played in the 1990 title winning side at Liverpool and scored 22 league goals from the left wing – the highest goal tally of his career. Ian Rush scored four fewer league goals than Barnes. Barnes was voted the Football Writers' Association Footballer of the Year for the second time (having also won it in 1988), and expectations from England manager Bobby Robson were also high, seeing Barnes as a key component in the buildup to the 1990 FIFA World Cup. Beardsley has since said Barnes at the end of the 1980s was "The best player I ever played with, bar none. For three or four years at the end of the '80s, John was possibly the best player in the world."

Barnes continued to play regularly for Liverpool and England into the 1990s. In the 1990–91 season, he scored 16 league goals. Arsenal were league champions in the season of Dalglish's resignation and his replacement by Graeme Souness as manager. Liverpool had qualified for the 1991–92 UEFA Cup, being readmitted to European competitions a year after the ban on all other English clubs in European competitions since the Heysel disaster in 1985 had been lifted. This was the first time Barnes had played in European competitions since Watford's 1983–84 UEFA Cup campaign.

"A ruptured Achilles [took] away the acceleration that had been key to Barnes the winger. There was a fear he may actually never be able to play again. But he returned and, in response, became Barnes the central midfielder, using his technical prowess and game intelligence to dictate play from the middle of the pitch. And added more than 200 appearances."

— Liverpool F.C. profile on Barnes (ranking him fifth in their greatest players list) post-1992 and his change of position following injury.

Barnes missed most of the 1991–92 season due to a succession of injuries and played just 12 league games, scoring once, as Liverpool finished sixth in the league – their lowest finish in two decades and the first time since 1981 that they had failed to finish champions or runners-up. In April he assisted Rush's opener in Liverpool's 2–0 win against their arch rivals Manchester United at Anfield that confirmed Leeds as champions. Liverpool won the 1992 FA Cup final with Barnes having played a crucial role in getting the team to Wembley with a free-kick four minutes from the end of the semi-final against Portsmouth which hit the post and rolled along the goal line from which teammate Ronnie Whelan equalised for Liverpool, a saviour act from Barnes which the club's site described as "one moment of brilliance to keep Liverpool's FA Cup dreams alive", but Barnes missed the final through injury. The next month in June he was injured playing for England in Helsinki in a warm up game before Euro 1992. Barnes was out injured for five months. He never recovered his explosive burst of speed that had been a key element of his play. He was now past his playing peak.

Barnes and several other senior players had a strained relationship with Souness as the manager tried to impose new methods quickly. Many senior pros resented his hard discipline approach as well as the increased pressure in training. Barnes also once had to make a public apology to Souness after he gave an interview criticising the tactics employed by the manager before an important match. Young teammate Robbie Fowler also said in his autobiography that Souness felt at the time Barnes was past his best, but in Fowler's (and others') opinion he still had a lot to offer and was still one of the most talented players at the club.

Souness later stated in his autobiography that Barnes, due to his injuries, was now taking a "less demanding" central midfield playmaker's role as opposed to a goalscoring winger. Despite the effects of the injuries, Barnes was still regarded as one of the club and country's best players and Souness noted that Barnes "Retained his quality on the ball, using it well and rarely losing possession". Mark Walters, who had played for Souness at Rangers, had been purchased as cover/competition for Barnes but failed to displace him.

Following Liverpool's league title in 1990, they were usurped by Arsenal, Leeds, Manchester United and Blackburn Rovers each winning the league at least once. Under Roy Evans, Barnes and younger players like the team's new talisman Steve McManaman, midfielder Jamie Redknapp, and Fowler (who had been given their debuts by either Dalglish or Souness) won the 1995 Football League Cup final (which saw Barnes complete the set of domestic honours) and were 1996 FA Cup final runners-up due to Eric Cantona's goal. Liverpool's Spice Boys team of this era drew stinging criticism for wearing matching cream Armani suits to the latter final. On the final day of the 1994–95 season, Barnes scored the equaliser followed by Redknapp's late winner for Liverpool against league leaders Blackburn, the latter goal greeted by "near silence at Anfield", in a game that could have handed the league title to bitter rivals Manchester United had they also won their game. Barnes later reflected: "As professionals we certainly wanted to win the game and of course we did just that. However, we did not want Manchester United to win the league, so fortunately West Ham did Blackburn a favour by drawing with United."

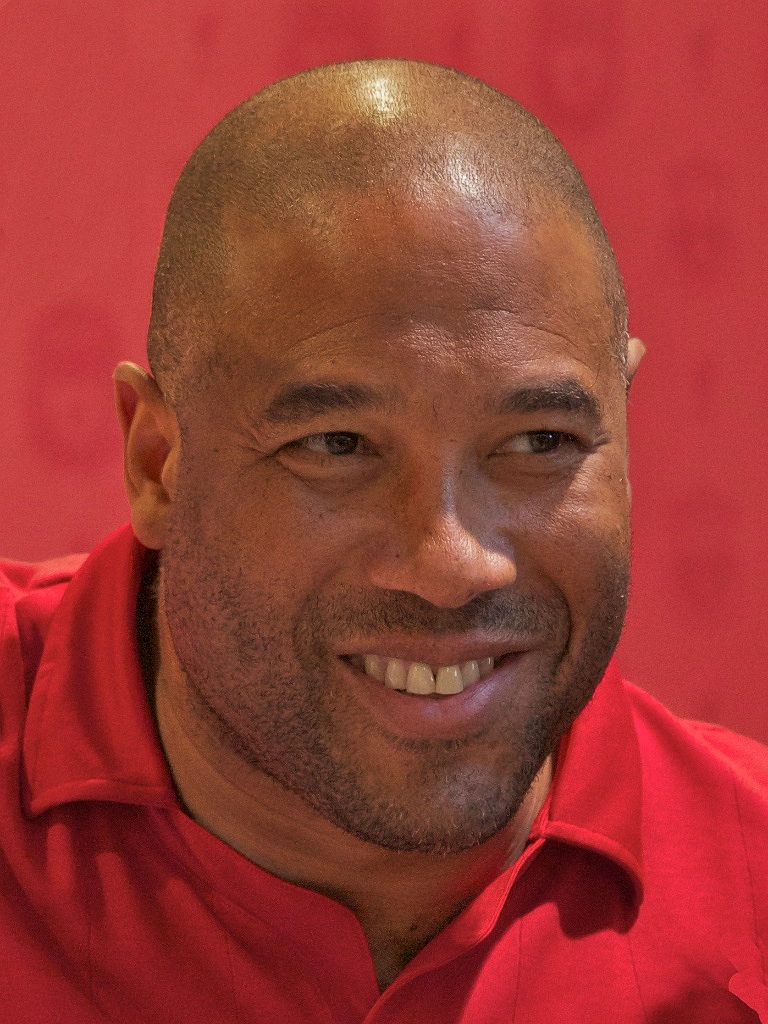
Barnes representing Liverpool in Kristiansund, June 2012

By the mid-1990s, Barnes had been moved from the left wing to the position of a holding midfielder. He often captained the side in 1995–96 when regular captain Rush lost his place to the club's new record signing Stan Collymore. When Rush departed to Leeds United at the season's end Barnes became full-time captain. Barnes created the final goal after a dribble and passing movement for Collymore during Liverpool's 4–3 win against Newcastle at Anfield, which is often considered as being arguably the greatest game in Premier League history.

Jamie Carragher debuted for the Liverpool first team in January 1997 and said that despite the 33-year-old Barnes now being past his peak, he was still the best player at the club. Carragher: "Technically, he's the best player I've ever trained or played with, he was great with both feet, they were both exactly the same. I'd say he's the best finisher I've ever played with (including Torres, Fowler, Owen). Barnes never used to blast his shots – they'd just get placed right in the corner. You speak with the players from those great Liverpool sides and ask them who the best player they played with was and they all say John Barnes".

On 13 August 1997, three months before his 34th birthday, after 10 years at Liverpool with 407 appearances, 108 goals, and five major trophies, Barnes left on a free transfer. He had missed just three Premier League games in his final season at Anfield, scoring four goals (including a memorable late winner against Southampton just after Christmas) as they had led the table for much of the first half of the season before being overhauled by eventual champions Manchester United at the end of January and having to settle for a fourth-place finish. Paul Ince, with a completely contrasting combative style, was signed from Inter Milan to replace Barnes in central midfield.

=== Newcastle United ===
Barnes was subsequently snapped up by former teammate and manager Kenny Dalglish, who was managing Newcastle United. Although an approach had already been made by Harry Redknapp of West Ham United, Barnes had agreed in principle to join them, until at the final moment Dalglish called him, and Barnes changed his mind. In the 1997–98 season, Barnes played up front, mostly, deputising for Alan Shearer after he was injured for most of the season, and Barnes ended up Newcastle's top league scorer with six goals, highlighting the Magpies' lack of ability to score in the absence of the injured Shearer, while Les Ferdinand and Peter Beardsley had both been sold. Former Liverpool colleague Ian Rush and England colleague Stuart Pearce were also drafted in for the 1997–98 season. Pearce has since stated in his autobiography, Psycho, that he felt Barnes was overweight by the time he joined Newcastle and that both Barnes and Rush had less desire than himself to win at that stage in their careers as they had already won everything, and that they could have had more of an edge to them.

Newcastle (the previous season's Premier League runners-up) endured a disappointing league campaign and finished 13th, although they did reach the 1998 FA Cup final, and Barnes went onto the field for the fourth FA Cup final of his career as the club finished runners-up. Additionally, Barnes played in the UEFA Champions League, including in the club's 3-2 victory over Barcelona. Following the sacking of Dalglish early in the 1998–99 season, he was left isolated and shunned along with a number of Dalglish and Keegan era players including Pearce and Rob Lee. Barnes with many others was dropped from the first team by new manager Ruud Gullit and spent several months in the reserves despite, in his opinion, "excelling in training" and showing he had lost none of his quality if some of his pace. He felt that himself and others were deliberately being cold shouldered to make it known Gullit wanted his own players in; Barnes had worked briefly with Gullit during the 1998 World Cup ITV commentary team, and they had played numerous international matches played against each other in the 1980s and 1990s, but they were not friends. Barnes knew it was the last straw when even his MBE from the Queen was overlooked by Gullit after a presentation had been given to Pearce for receiving one – this was in the winter of 1998 and he knew he was unwanted. Barnes left the club on a free transfer to newly promoted Charlton Athletic on 10 February 1999.

=== Charlton Athletic ===
Barnes made his debut for Charlton Athletic on 13 February 1999, coming on as a substitute in a 1–0 home win over Liverpool. He made a further 11 league appearances that season, mostly as a substitute, and did not score any goals. Defeat on the final day of the season relegated the Addicks back to Division One, and Barnes announced his retirement as a player after 20 years.

=== Celtic ===
During his short spell as Celtic manager, Barnes would later register as a player, although he did not make an appearance for the Scottish side.

== Racism ==
During his playing career, Barnes (like other Black players of his era) was frequently the target of racial abuse from the terraces. At one of his first appearances at Anfield, Barnes said that the tea lady had, intentionally or unintentionally, served tea to all the players in the lounge except him, and he made a joke about it by asking light-heartedly, "Is it because I'm Black?" As well as being abused by opposition players, on occasions Barnes reported overhearing teammates making racist remarks towards other black players in opposition teams. One instance of racial abuse by a section of Everton supporters in the Merseyside derby at Anfield led to Everton chairman Philip Carter disowning the offending supporters, branding them "scum". The highest profile racial incident of his career was captured in a photograph where Barnes, in full Liverpool kit and mid-match, casually backheeled away a banana which had been hurled at him during a 1988 match with Everton at Goodison Park.

== International career ==
Although born in Jamaica, Barnes had no intention of representing Jamaica at international level as the "Reggae Boyz had not yet made a significant mark on world football and he was eager to get to the game's biggest stage". At the time of Barnes' international career, FIFA's national team eligibility criteria allowed British passport holders to represent one of the British football associations if they had no blood ties to the United Kingdom. Barnes had already planned to represent England where he had lived since the age of 12. Barnes said: "the only reason I played for England was because they were the first to ask ... if Scotland had asked [first] ... You go and play for Scotland."

Barnes debuted for Bobby Robson's England on 28 May 1983 as a second-half substitute for Watford teammate Luther Blissett in a 0–0 draw at Northern Ireland's Windsor Park in the British Championship. Blissett was the fifth and Barnes the seventh black full England football internationals. England failed to qualify for the 1984 European Championships, so instead toured South America. On 10 June 1984, against Brazil, Barnes dribbled through several Brazilian defenders and rounded Roberto Costa to score in a friendly match at Rio de Janeiro's Estádio do Maracanã. In his early England days, he and fellow black player Mark Chamberlain were subjected to threats from racist groups. Barnes was abused by supporters of the far-right National Front on the plane back from South America in June 1984; with the group claiming that England had only won 1–0 against Brazil because Barnes' goal "didn't count". A 2002 Channel 4 poll saw Barnes' goal against Brazil ranked number 75 in the list of the 100 Greatest Sporting Moments.

"When he did get pulses racing in an England shirt it came in the form of brief cameos, such as the game-changing display as a substitute in the World Cup quarter-final against Argentina in 1986, when both he and Chris Waddle were brought on to chase the game with England 2–0 down. Barnes terrorised the three-man Argentina defence, dragging them out of position and creating Lineker's 81st-minute goal. In 15 minutes Barnes showed that he could influence a game every bit as much as Diego Maradona. But that Barnes and Waddle – two of the England squad's most creative and skilful players (Glenn Hoddle being the other) – were afforded such scant time on the pitch, showed the lack of proactive thinking that would dog Barnes's international career."

— The Guardian on England's use of Barnes and other creative players of the era.

Robson did not use Barnes at the 1986 World Cup until the quarter-final with 15 minutes left when trailing 2–0 against Argentina. (BBC commentator Barry Davies shouted "Go on! Run at them!" when Barnes was given the ball), setting up a goal for Gary Lineker and laying on another chance denied by the head of Lineker's Argentine marker. England were eliminated with Barnes praised for his contribution and many asked why he had not played more nor in previous games. It was after the World Cup that Barnes became a British passport holder. Speaking in 2008, Barnes said "I don't even know if the English F.A. didn't know that I wasn't born there and wasn't brought up there...maybe I played (for England) illegally, right?"

As part of a front four with Lineker, Peter Beardsley, and Chris Waddle, England lost all three of their group games at the 1988 European Championships. However, Robson stayed in his job. Barnes pulled out of England's first international game after the Hillsborough disaster due to grief he felt at the time and the game coinciding with a funeral. In his absence, England won the World Cup qualifier against Albania 5–0 at Wembley on 26 April 1989. In the lead up to the 1990 World Cup, Barnes played several times as a forward alongside Lineker, and in a warm up game against Uruguay played well and scored a half volley from a Stuart Pearce cross. Barnes again rapped this time in New Order's UK Number 1, "World in Motion", tie-in song. At the World Cup, he injured his groin against Belgium, shortly after his volleyed goal was wrongly disallowed for offside. Gregg Bakowski in The Guardian writes: "Barnes, rather than David Platt, could have been England's hero against Belgium, having had a perfectly good volleyed goal disallowed. But soon after he sustained a groin injury that ended his tournament". England went out to West Germany on penalties in the semi-final.

In June 1992, in England's last warm up game (against Finland in Helsinki) before the 1992 European Championships, Barnes tore his achilles tendon. He was injured for five months. In his absence England were eliminated at the group phase. On his return he had lost his explosive burst of speed and was now past his peak. In a Wembley 1994 World Cup qualifier against San Marino, Barnes was booed by an entire section of England fans after the whole team played poorly. Barnes later believed an article attributed to Jimmy Greaves in the Daily Mirror, which cited his supposed support for the West Indies cricket team and questioned his loyalty to the England team, had influenced the crowd to boo. He earned a surprise England recall in 1994 under Terry Venables and was in the squad in the run up to Euro 96 after improved form for Liverpool, although he was not selected for the final tournament squad despite England not having an established left-sided alternative.

"At Liverpool he could receive the ball over 20 to 30 times in a match from team-mates who were schooled to draw players and pass short. In a statuesque England team, where he was chained to the left wing, it could be as few as six or seven. The chances to impact the game were few and far between, with a lack of movement inhibiting Barnes's inclination to play a one-two to get on the move in the first place and then let the magic follow some simple but effective buildup play."

— The Guardian on the rigidity of the England team Barnes played for in contrast to Liverpool.

Barnes' 79 caps (10 goals) made him England's record capped black player for a time. Compared to his club form, he was never seen as a player who peaked wearing an England shirt. Robson described him as the "Greatest enigma" of his career; whilst including him for his all time dream team England squad of all the players he had picked as manager in his 1990 book Against All Odds (placing him on the bench), he was baffled at Barnes's inconsistency. He described Barnes as being a player of "the highest calibre" but sometimes being unable to reach for that bit extra when he or captain Bryan Robson shouted at him to take more players on.

Barnes has since said he felt the systems England played were "rigid" focusing on speed, aggression, and attacking through the centre rather than patient, passing play. He also said he could receive the ball as few as six or seven times in a game whereas at Liverpool he may receive it more than twenty times, and he had more freedom under Kenny Dalglish who did not ask him to stay on the left wing all the time. England also had a very different system to Liverpool at the time, who were much more free-flowing, and later said that to have got the best out of him, they would have needed a similar system to the one used by Dalglish, which was never likely to happen. He also cited Glenn Hoddle and Chris Waddle as players he felt England were unable to get the best out of.

Newspapers at the time of his England career even queried whether his disciplinarian upbringing in Jamaica to a military family and rumoured beatings as a child from his parents had contributed to his underperformance as an England footballer. After 12 years Barnes won his 79th and last cap on 6 September 1995 in a 0–0 friendly draw with Colombia at Wembley that contained extrovert Colombian goalkeeper René Higuita's 'Scorpion Kick.' Barnes was in the top ten most capped players list for eleven years until David Beckham and then Gary Neville edged him from ninth to 11th. In 1999, Tony Adams picked Barnes to be in his England dream team in his book Addicted, citing that Barnes "could pass, move, dribble, had Brazilian style movement... what more could you want?" He also backed Barnes's view that England at times used rigid systems.

== Managerial career ==
=== Celtic ===
In a "dream ticket" style move, Barnes was appointed head coach of Celtic on 8 June 1999, working under Kenny Dalglish as director of football. After his appointment he later re-registered himself as a player but never played a competitive game for Celtic. He was sacked 8 months into his tenure following a home 3–1 1999–2000 Scottish Cup defeat by First Division club Inverness Caledonian Thistle in February. The result led to the newspaper headline "Super Caley go ballistic, Celtic are atrocious". Dalglish took over first-team duties until the end of the season. Although Dalglish won the League Cup in the process, his contract was not renewed and the board decided to replace him with Martin O'Neill.

=== Jamaica ===
Barnes entered discussions with the Jamaica Football Federation in September 2008 regarding the possibility of him managing the Jamaica national team. On 16 September 2008, Barnes was appointed as manager of Jamaica announcing Mike Commane as his assistant. Barnes guided his new Jamaican charges to a first-place finish in the 2008 Caribbean Championships, qualifying as the top Caribbean side for the 2009 CONCACAF Gold Cup. In February 2009, Barnes told Sky Sports that he wanted to return to club management if the opportunity arose. It was reported in May 2009 that Barnes contacted English League Two side Port Vale to see whether he could replace out-going manager Dean Glover.

=== Tranmere Rovers ===
The potential move to Port Vale did not happen. On 14 June 2009, he confirmed that he was to be appointed manager of League One side Tranmere Rovers. Barnes was officially named as manager of Tranmere Rovers on 15 June 2009, with Jason McAteer assisting him. He got off to a disastrous start, with Tranmere only winning three of their first fourteen games. On 9 October 2009, Barnes was sacked by the club six days after a 5–0 defeat at Millwall and a run of just two wins from eleven league games.

== Accolades ==
Former England international Tom Finney remarked that "players like John Barnes come along just once in a lifetime." Twice in his career, Barnes was voted Football Writers' Association Footballer of the Year. He also won the PFA Players' Player of the Year. Barnes was voted England's "greatest left foot" by readers of The Times in 2016, ahead of Chris Waddle and Jimmy Greaves. Barnes was inducted into the English Football Hall of Fame in 2005 in recognition of his contribution to the English game. The Liverpool fans' adoration for "Digger", as he was nicknamed after the character Digger Barnes in the American soap opera Dallas, was emphasised when he finished in the top 5 of the poll 100 Players Who Shook The Kop which was conducted by the official Liverpool Football Club website in the summer of 2006. More than 110,000 supporters worldwide voted for their 10 favourite players of all time, Barnes finished 5th behind Robbie Fowler (4th), Ian Rush (3rd), Steven Gerrard (2nd), and the man that signed him three times (for Liverpool, Newcastle, and Celtic) Kenny Dalglish (1st). He also appears frequently as a selection in FourFourTwo magazine's Perfect XI, a choice in which current and former professional footballers select the best 11 players they have ever seen, played with or against, including selections by Michael Owen, Steve McManaman, Peter Beardsley, Ian Wright, and Jamie Carragher.

== Music career ==
Barnes performed the Keith Allen-penned rap section of New Order's "World in Motion" as well as appearing on the track "Anfield Rap", a Liverpool FA Cup final song, rapping the lyrics "Liverpool FC is hard as hell/United, Tottenham, Arsenal", and performing lead rap in Liverpool's '96 cup final song "Pass & Move (It's the Liverpool Groove)". "World in Motion" reached No. 1 in the charts and spent 18 weeks in the UK top 75 (including re-releases in 2002 and 2010) although Barnes was only paid a flat rate of £200 and received no royalties. "Anfield Rap" reached No. 3 and spent 6 weeks in the top 75, and "Pass & Move" reached No. 4 and spent 4 weeks in the top 75. The rap portion of "World in Motion" is an iconic piece of English football culture in its own right, familiar to subsequent generations of England football fans not yet born by 1990.

== Personal life ==
Barnes was first married to and subsequently divorced Suzy, with whom he has two sons and two daughters. Barnes' second wife is called Andrea and they have two daughters and a son. They live in Wirral, Merseyside. With fellow former footballers Les Ferdinand and Luther Blissett, he founded Team48 Motorsport, a team aiming to promote young racing drivers of African-Caribbean background. In 2008, the team entered the British Touring Car Championship, running Alfa Romeos for white Jamaican Matthew Gore and 18-year-old black Briton Darelle Wilson. However, the project never got off the starting line and the team failed to show up for any of the races. A few days after being sacked by Tranmere, Barnes was declared bankrupt. He has described the bankruptcy as a technicality, saying: "The bankruptcy issue is a tax oversight which is being dealt with." Barnes' claims of the bankruptcy being a "tax oversight" proved true and the order was quickly overturned.

== Media, charity work and politics ==
As a sporting icon in England in the early 1990s Barnes appeared in a commercial for the energy drink Lucozade, launching their Lucozade Sport drink. Barnes became a pundit on ITV and a presenter of the football coverage on Five as well as having his own weekly football discussion show on LFC TV called The John Barnes Show, every Thursday. He also worked as an ambassador for Save the Children. In 1994, he featured on an educational video, Hoax Calls Kill, produced in collaboration with the Merseyside Fire Brigade.

Barnes has appeared on several shows and media outlets to promote his charity work, including a notable appearance on Soccer AM in February 2009 performing the "World in Motion" rap and a parody of the mistimed advert by ITV in the previous week's Everton vs. Liverpool FA Cup tie, with Barnes' "Under-11 World Champion Baton-twirling" routine missed by mock commercials. In 2001, Barnes appeared on Lily Savage's Blankety Blank. In 2000, Barnes presented a one off soccer special with Lisa Rogers entitled The Pepsi World Challenge, devised and produced by Nathan Carey and airing on Channel 5 in the UK. The show was edited with local presenters around the world. He was the subject of a This is Your Life programme in 2001, when he was surprised by Michael Aspel.

In 2006, Barnes visited Israel as part of an The Football Association (FA) delegation to help launch a "Kick It Out" anti racism campaign, organised with the Israel Football Association and the New Israel Fund; during the visit he took part in events in the Arab town of Sakhnin highlighting Jewish–Arab coexistence through football.

Barnes competed in the fifth series of Strictly Come Dancing which started in October 2007. His dance partner was Nicole Cutler. They finished in seventh place. He was also the first male celebrity to receive a ten from the judges, which he got for his salsa. After an absence of nearly eight years, Barnes returned to football in late 2007. He agreed to run several coaching clinics across the Caribbean for young players with the possibility of them joining Premier League side Sunderland on trial. He made a guest appearance as himself in episode 10 of Series 6 of Waterloo Road that was aired on BBC One on Wednesday, 27 October 2010.

Barnes has been used as a pundit in ESPN's coverage of the 2009–10 FA Cup, and in SuperSport's coverage of the 2010–11 UEFA Champions League, in South Africa. He appeared on Russell Howard's Good News best bits show on Thursday, 15 December 2011, as his Mystery Guest. In the show he was dressed as Santa Claus and along with Russell Howard he performed his famous rap from New Order's "World in Motion". On 17 October 2012, Barnes featured in series 9, episode 9 of the BBC series Who Do You Think You Are?. Barnes has suggested the Rooney Rule, used in the National Football League (NFL), which requires teams to interview minority candidates for coaching positions, should be adopted by the Premier League.

In 2016 in the run-up to the 2016 EU referendum, Barnes refuted Michael Gove's claim that he wished the United Kingdom to leave the European Union, clarifying that he supports continued UK membership of the EU. In January 2018, Barnes participated as a housemate on the twenty-first series of Celebrity Big Brother. On 21 February 2019, Barnes was a guest on Question Time, commenting on racism and discrimination in society.

== Career statistics ==
=== Club ===
Appearances and goals by club, season and competition
Club	Season	League			FA Cup		League Cup		Europe		Total	
Club	Season	Division	Apps	Goals	Apps	Goals	Apps	Goals	Apps	Goals	Apps	Goals
Watford	1981–82	Second Division	36	13	3	0	5	1	0	0	44	14
Watford	1982–83	First Division	42	10	4	1	3	0	4	2	53	13
Watford	1983–84	First Division	39	11	7	4	2	1	6	0	54	16
Watford	1984–85	First Division	40	12	2	0	5	3	0	0	47	15
Watford	1985–86	First Division	39	9	8	3	3	1	0	0	50	13
Watford	1986–87	First Division	37	10	7	3	3	1	1	0	48	14
Watford	Total		233	65	31	11	21	7	11	2	296	85
Liverpool	1987–88	First Division	38	15	7	2	3	0	0	0	48	17
Liverpool	1988–89	First Division	33	8	6	3	3	2	0	0	42	13
Liverpool	1989–90	First Division	34	22	8	5	2	1	0	0	44	28
Liverpool	1990–91	First Division	35	16	7	1	2	0	0	0	44	17
Liverpool	1991–92	First Division	12	1	4	3	0	0	1	0	17	4
Liverpool	1992–93	Premier League	27	5	2	0	2	0	0	0	31	5
Liverpool	1993–94	Premier League	26	3	2	0	2	0	0	0	30	3
Liverpool	1994–95	Premier League	38	7	6	2	6	0	0	0	50	9
Liverpool	1995–96	Premier League	36	3	7	0	3	0	4	0	50	3
Liverpool	1996–97	Premier League	35	4	2	0	3	0	7	3	47	7
Liverpool	Total		314	84	51	16	26	3	12	3	403	106
Newcastle United	1997–98	Premier League	26	6	5	0	3	0	5	1	39	7
Newcastle United	1998–99	Premier League	1	0	0	0	0	0	0	0	1	0
Newcastle United	Total		27	6	5	0	3	0	5	1	40	7
Charlton Athletic	1998–99	Premier League	12	0	0	0	0	0	0	0	12	0
Career total			586	155	87	27	50	10	28	6	751	198

=== International ===
Appearances and goals by national team and year
National team	Year	Apps	Goals
England	1983	6	0
England	1984	9	3
England	1985	9	0
England	1986	5	0
England	1987	5	3
England	1988	9	0
England	1989	6	2
England	1990	11	1
England	1991	5	0
England	1992	2	0
England	1993	6	1
England	1994	3	0
England	1995	3	0
Total		79	10

Scores and results list England's goal tally first, score column indicates score after each Barnes goal.

List of international goals scored by John Barnes
No.	Date	Venue	Opponent	Score	Result	Competition
1	10 June 1984	Maracanã Stadium, Rio de Janeiro, Brazil	Brazil	1–0	2–0	Friendly
2	18 June 1986	Besiktas Inonu Stadium, Istanbul, Turkey	Turkey	4–0	8–0	1986 FIFA World Cup qualifier
3	18 June 1986	Besiktas Inonu Stadium, Istanbul, Turkey	Turkey	5–0	8–0	1986 FIFA World Cup qualifier
4	14 October 1987	Wembley Stadium, London, England	Turkey	1–0	8–0	UEFA Euro 1988 qualifier
5	14 October 1987	Wembley Stadium, London, England	Turkey	3–0	8–0	UEFA Euro 1988 qualifier
6	11 November 1987	Red Star Stadium, Belgrade, Yugoslavia	Yugoslavia	2–0	4–1	UEFA Euro 1988 qualifier
7	8 March 1989	Qemal Stafa Stadium, Tirana, Albania	Albania	1–0	2–0	1990 FIFA World Cup qualifier
8	3 June 1989	Wembley Stadium, London, England	Poland	2–0	3–0	1990 FIFA World Cup qualifier
9	22 May 1990	Wembley Stadium, London, England	Uruguay	1–1	1–2	Friendly
10	28 April 1993	Wembley Stadium, London, England	Netherlands	1–0	2–2	1994 FIFA World Cup qualifier

== Managerial statistics ==
As of 6 September 2009

Team	Nation	From	To	Matches	Won	Drawn	Lost	Win %
Celtic	Scotland	10 June 1999	10 February 2000	29	19	2	8	65.51
Jamaica	Jamaica	16 September 2008	30 June 2009	11	7	4	0	63.63
Tranmere Rovers	England	15 June 2009	9 October 2009	12	3	1	8	25.00
Total				52	29	7	16	55.77

== Honours ==
=== Player ===
Watford

- FA Cup runner-up: 1983–84

Liverpool

- Football League First Division: 1987–88, 1989–90
- FA Cup: 1988–89, 1991–92; runner-up: 1987–88, 1995–96
- Football League Cup: 1994–95
- FA Charity Shield: 1988, 1989, 1990

Newcastle United

- FA Cup runner-up: 1997–98

=== Manager ===
Jamaica

- Caribbean Cup: 2008

=== Individual ===
- PFA Players' Player of the Year: 1988
- FWA Footballer of the Year: 1988, 1990
- PFA First Division Team of the Year: 1987–88 First Division, 1989–90 First Division, 1990–91 First Division
- PFA Team of the Century (1977–1996): 2007
- Member of the Order of the British Empire: 1998
- Inducted into the English Football Hall of Fame: 2005

== See also ==
- List of England international footballers born outside England
