= 1988–89 Liverpool F.C. season =

English football club season

Liverpool
1988–89 season
- Chairman: John Smith
- Manager: Kenny Dalglish
- First Division: 2nd
- FA Cup: Winners
- League Cup: Fourth round
- FA Charity Shield: Winners
- League Centenary Trophy: semi-finals
- Top goalscorer: League: John Aldridge (21); All: John Aldridge (31)
- Average home league attendance: 38,713
Home colours	Away colours	Third colours

The 1988–89 season was the 97th season in Liverpool F.C.'s existence, and was their 27th consecutive year in the First Division, and covers the period from 20 August 1988 to 26 May 1989.

The season was overshadowed by the Hillsborough disaster on 15 April 1989. 94 of the club's fans died that day in a crush on the terraces in the semi-final of the FA Cup; a 95th fan died three days later. The death toll reached 96 and 97 when another fan died nearly four years later, never regaining consciousness, and when Andrew Devine died in 2021 after suffering from severe and irreversible brain damage from the incident.

Liverpool won the rescheduled FA Cup semi-final and went on to win the trophy by beating Everton 3–2 in the final, but were then denied the double for the second season running in even more dramatic fashion than the previous season, when a last minute Arsenal goal gave the visitors a 2–0 win at Anfield and sent the league title to Highbury on goals scored. They had spent much of the season on the fringes of the title race, frequently led by Arsenal and underdogs including Norwich City, Coventry City and newly promoted Millwall, but a late surge in form had seen them cruise back to the top of the league by the time of the penultimate league game.

== Squad ==
Goalkeepers

- (Zimbabwe) Bruce Grobbelaar
- (England) Mike Hooper

Defenders

- (England) Gary Ablett
- (Republic of Ireland) Jim Beglin
- (England) David Burrows
- (Scotland) Gary Gillespie
- (Scotland) Alan Hansen
- (Scotland) Steve Nicol
- (Republic of Ireland) Steve Staunton
- (England) Nick Tanner
- (England) Barry Venison
- (England) Alex Watson

Midfielders

- (England) John Barnes
- (England) Charlie Boyd
- (Scotland) Kenny Dalglish
- (Republic of Ireland) Ray Houghton
- (England) Steve McMahon
- (Northern Ireland) Jim Magilton
- (England) Mike Marsh
- (Denmark) Jan Mølby
- (England) Nigel Spackman
- (Republic of Ireland) Ronnie Whelan

Attackers

- (Republic of Ireland) John Aldridge
- (England) Peter Beardsley
- (England) John Durnin
- (Wales) Ian Rush

== Squad statistics ==
=== Appearances and goals ===
No.	Pos	Nat	Player	Total		Division 1		FA Cup		Charity Shield		League Cup		Centenary Trophy	
No.	Pos	Nat	Player	Apps	Goals	Apps	Goals	Apps	Goals	Apps	Goals	Apps	Goals	Apps	Goals
	DF	(England) ENG	Gary Ablett	49	0	34+1	0	6+0	0	1+0	0	6+0	0	1+0	0
	FW	(Republic of Ireland) IRL	John Aldridge	47	31	31+4	21	6+0	6	1+0	2	4+1	2	0+0	0
	MF	(England) ENG	John Barnes	44	14	33+0	8	6+0	3	1+0	0	3+0	2	1+0	1
	FW	(England) ENG	Peter Beardsley	51	12	33+4	10	5+0	2	1+0	0	6+0	0	2+0	0
	DF	(England) ENG	David Burrows	24	0	16+5	0	3+0	0	0+0	0	0+0	0	0+0	0
	FW	(Scotland) SCO	Kenny Dalglish	2	0	0+0	0	0+0	0	0+0	0	0+1	0	0+1	0
	FW	(England) ENG	John Durnin	2	0	0+0	0	0+0	0	0+0	0	0+1	0	1+0	0
	DF	(Scotland) SCO	Gary Gillespie	21	2	15+0	1	2+0	0	1+0	0	1+0	1	2+0	0
	GK	(Zimbabwe) ZIM	Bruce Grobbelaar	28	0	21+0	0	5+0	0	1+0	0	0+0	0	1+0	0
	DF	(Scotland) SCO	Alan Hansen	8	0	6+0	0	2+0	0	0+0	0	0+0	0	0+0	0
	GK	(England) ENG	Mike Hooper	25	0	17+0	0	1+0	0	0+0	0	6+0	0	1+0	0
	MF	(Republic of Ireland) IRL	Ray Houghton	52	8	38+0	7	5+0	0	1+0	0	6+0	0	2+0	1
	MF	(Scotland) SCO	Kevin MacDonald	6	0	3+0	0	0+0	0	0+0	0	1+1	0	1+0	0
	MF	(England) ENG	Mike Marsh	1	0	0+1	0	0+0	0	0+0	0	0+0	0	0+0	0
	MF	(England) ENG	Steve McMahon	40	7	28+1	3	6+0	3	1+0	0	3+0	1	1+0	0
	MF	(Denmark) DEN	Jan Mølby	19	4	12+1	2	3+0	0	0+0	0	2+0	1	1+0	1
	MF	(Scotland) SCO	Steve Nicol	52	2	38+0	2	6+0	0	0+0	0	6+0	0	2+0	0
	FW	(Wales) WAL	Ian Rush	32	11	16+8	7	1+1	3	0+0	0	4+0	1	2+0	0
	MF	(England) ENG	Nigel Spackman	16	0	8+4	0	0+0	0	0+0	0	4+0	0	0+0	0
	DF	(Republic of Ireland) IRL	Steve Staunton	29	1	17+4	0	3+0	0	0+0	0	4+0	0	1+0	1
	DF	(England) ENG	Barry Venison	22	1	14+1	0	0+1	0	1+0	0	4+0	0	1+0	1
	DF	(England) ENG	Alex Watson	6	0	1+1	0	1+1	0	1+0	0	0+1	0	0+0	0
	MF	(Republic of Ireland) IRL	Ronnie Whelan	51	4	37+0	4	5+0	0	1+0	0	6+0	0	2+0	0

== Transfers ==
=== In ===
Pos	Player	From	Fee	Date
DF	(England) Nick Tanner	(England) Bristol Rovers	£20,000	01-08-1988
FW	(Wales) Ian Rush	(Italy) Juventus	£2,800,000	18-08-1988
DF	(England) David Burrows	(England) West Bromwich Albion	£550,000	20-10-1988
DF	(England) Barry Jones	(England) Prescot Cables	£500	19-01-1989

=== Out ===
Pos	Player	To	Fee	Date
MF	(England) Nigel Spackman	(England) Queens Park Rangers	£500,000	02-02-1989
FW	(England) John Durnin	(England) Oxford United	£250,000	10-02-1989

== Diary of the season ==
=== August ===
After an unhappy season in Italy with Juventus, Ian Rush returned to Anfield on 18 August in a £2.8million deal - a record fee paid by a British club, and the third time in three weeks the national record had been broken. However, the Reds were not alone in signing a top striker to prepare for a title challenge - their close neighbours Everton had paid the previous national record of £2.1million a few days earlier for West Ham United striker Tony Cottee. The challenge from a resurgent Manchester United was likely to be stronger as well following their £1.8million recapture of Mark Hughes.

The season began on 20 August with a 2–1 win over Wimbledon, who had shocked them with a 1–0 win in the FA Cup final the previous May, in the FA Charity Shield. John Aldridge scored both of Liverpool's goals, and rather than relegate Aldridge to the bench on Rush's return, manager Kenny Dalglish altered the 4-4-2 formation to 4-3-3 in order for Rush, Aldridge and Beardsley to feature alongside each other in what was undoubtedly the finest attacking line-up in English football, complemented by wingers John Barnes and Ray Houghton.

Aldridge was on target again on the opening day of the season (27 August) as Liverpool triumphed 3–0 over Charlton Athletic at Selhurst Park and Aldridge grabbed all three goals.

=== September ===
September was a slightly disappointing month for the Reds, who began it well with a 1–0 home win over Manchester United at Anfield and finished it with an impressive 3–1 win at Southampton, but in between they were held to 1-1 draws by Aston Villa at Villa Park and Tottenham Hotspur at Anfield. After five league games, they were second in the league behind Norwich City.

As September ended, the Football League Cup quest began for Liverpool in the second round with a 1–0 home win over Walsall.

=== October ===
October brought more frustration for a Liverpool side who lost 2–1 at home to struggling Newcastle United at the beginning of the month, and were also beaten by Luton Town and Nottingham Forest before the month was out. On the positive side, they did manage a league win - 2–0 away to West Ham United at the end of the month - and also managed to eliminate Walsall in the League Cup. However, they had slipped to fourth in the First Division which was still being led by Norwich City, who had an eight-point lead over Liverpool and a six-point lead over second placed Arsenal. Millwall, in their first season in the top flight, were springing many surprises as they occupied third place, while regular contenders Nottingham Forest completed the top five. However, the much anticipated title challenge from Manchester United and Everton was not yet transpiring, as both clubs were in the bottom half of the table.

Midfielder Jan Mølby was jailed for three months on a drink-driving charge on 17 October.

=== November ===
November was another month of underachievement for Liverpool, who were unbeaten in four games but only managed to win two of them, and ended the month still only fourth in the league, though they had managed to cut the gap between themselves and leaders Norwich City to six points. Arsenal and Millwall were still second and third respectively. After managing to eliminate Arsenal in the League Cup third round, Liverpool's quest for the trophy ended in the fourth round when they were thrashed 4–1 by relegation threatened West Ham United at Upton Park.

=== December ===
December brought yet more frustration for the Reds, who managed a 1–0 win at Derby County on Boxing Day, but could only manage 1–1 draws with Everton and Arsenal, and suffered a 1–0 home defeat to Norwich City. However, they were now standing third in the league, with new leaders Arsenal six points ahead of Liverpool and a point ahead of second placed Norwich City. Millwall's surprise challenge was continuing as they ended 1988 in fourth place, while Everton's resurgence had taken them to fifth place.

On a more positive note, Jan Molby was available for selection again at the beginning of the month after serving half of his prison sentence for drink-driving.

=== January ===
1989 began on a disappointing note for Liverpool, who were beaten 3–1 by Manchester United on New Year's Day at Old Trafford in a game dominated by 19-year-old United midfielder Russell Beardsmore. This left Liverpool fifth in the table and just one point and one place ahead of Alex Ferguson's improving side. They were now nine points behind leaders Arsenal and second placed Norwich City, and two points behind Millwall and Everton.

The FA Cup quest began at Brunton Park on 7 January, when Liverpool eliminated Fourth Division Carlisle United 3–0. Three weeks later they met Millwall in the fourth round at The Den and won 2–0, but their dreams of a unique second double were still looking doubtful as a less than brilliant month, including a 2–2 draw away at relegation threatened Sheffield Wednesday after being 2–0 down, meant they were still fourth in the league and nine points adrift of leaders Arsenal, who had a game in hand. Norwich City were still second and Coventry City had now leapfrogged them to occupy third place, though Everton had suffered another setback and now stood ninth.

=== February ===
February was a quiet month at Anfield, as bad weather restricted them to just two first team games. The first, at St James' Park in the league, saw them draw 2–2 with struggling Newcastle United and fail to improve on their fifth place standing. The second, however, gave more cause for celebration as Liverpool took on Hull City in the FA Cup fifth round at Boothferry Park and came away as 3–2 winners.

=== March ===
March saw what were arguably Liverpool's finest performances of the season yet. They were victors in all six league games, the best game being a 5–0 home win over Luton Town on 14 March, and a 1–0 home win over Derby County on 29 March meant that they ended the month in third place - five points behind leaders Arsenal and with a game in hand. Norwich City were still second, but the Reds were just two points behind them. Millwall and Nottingham Forest completed the top five, while Manchester United and Everton were heading for mid table mediocrity after giving the Reds a serious run for their money earlier in the season.

The FA Cup quarter-final on 18 March saw the Reds take on Third Division underdogs Brentford at Anfield, and any talk of a giant killing feat was quickly silenced as the Reds triumphed 4–0. This gave them a semi-final clash with Nottingham Forest at Hillsborough on 15 April.

=== April ===
The events at the FA Cup semi-final at Hillsborough on 15 April overshadowed Liverpool's season - and in general the whole English football season - as it became the worst tragedy to hit English sport and the worst day of Liverpool's history. A crush of Liverpool fans in the Leppings Lane end of the stadium as the game kicked off turned into a scene of carnage as it became apparent that people were being injured, and after six minutes the match was cancelled. It was soon clear that people were dying, while those lucky enough to survive managed to escape by climbing over the security fences (against which many of the dead and injured were crushed) and others managed to haul themselves to safety in the seated area above the behind-goal standing zone. Within a couple of hours, there was talk of more than 30 deaths, and by the evening it was clear that the death toll was well over double that number. 94 fans died that day - 93 at the stadium and a 94th on their way to hospital. The death toll reached 95 on 19 April when 14-year-old Lee Nichol died in hospital from his injuries. A 96th fan - Tony Bland - died in March 1993 after being in a coma for nearly four years. For a while, it looked as though the 1988–89 FA Cup would be cancelled in memory of the victims, but it was soon decided that the competition would continue.

In the league, the Reds managed comfortable wins over Norwich City, Sheffield Wednesday and Millwall to go top of the table above Arsenal on goal difference. However, there was no league action that month after the Hillsborough tragedy.

=== May ===
Liverpool's first competitive game after the tragedy at Hillsborough finally came on 3 May, when they drew 0–0 with Everton in the Merseyside derby at Goodison Park. By now, Arsenal had overtaken them and built up a five-point lead with four games remaining, though Liverpool had a game in hand. However, the next four league games were all won by Liverpool and they entered the final game of the season with a three-point lead over Arsenal. Their opponents in the final game of the season were Arsenal at Anfield, and only a win with a margin of two or more goals would see Arsenal prise the league title away from Liverpool. As 90 minutes loomed, Arsenal had a 1–0 lead but if it stayed that way Liverpool would seal the title by a single goal. However, Arsenal midfielder Michael Thomas scored with the last kick of the game and Arsenal sealed the league title by the narrowest possible margin.

Due to the Hillsborough tragedy, the English league season had been extended by two weeks and this meant that several clubs - including Liverpool - played twice after the FA Cup final.

The rescheduled FA Cup semi-final with Nottingham Forest was staged at Old Trafford on 7 May, and Liverpool won 3–1. This booked them their second all-Merseyside final with Everton in four seasons. John Aldridge, Liverpool's leading scorer that season, opened the scoring in the fourth minute, and Everton failed to respond until the 89th minute when Stuart McCall jabbed in a late equaliser to force extra time. Aldridge had come off in the 73rd minute to be replaced by Ian Rush, who restored Liverpool's lead in the 95th minute, only for Stuart McCall to respond with his second goal in the 102nd minute to equaliser once again. However, Rush scored the winner two minutes later, meaning that he had scored twice in both of the all-Merseyside FA Cup finals.

Had Liverpool won the league title as well, they would have become the first team to repeat the double. But as had happened the previous season (when they had won the league title but been pipped to the FA Cup in the final) they were beaten.

== League table ==
Pos	Team	Pld	W	D	L	GF	GA	GD	Pts	Qualification or relegation
1	Arsenal (C)	38	22	10	6	73	36	+37	76	Disqualified from the European Cup
2	Liverpool (Note: Liverpool would have qualified as FA Cup winners.)	38	22	10	6	65	28	+37	76	Disqualified from the European Cup Winners' Cup
3	Nottingham Forest (Note: Nottingham Forest would have qualified as League Cup winners.)	38	17	13	8	64	43	+21	64	Disqualified from the UEFA Cup
4	Norwich City	38	17	11	10	48	45	+3	62	Disqualified from the UEFA Cup
5	Derby County	38	17	7	14	40	38	+2	58	

Source: World Football
Rules for classification: 1) Points; 2) Goal difference; 3) Goals scored
(C) Champions

== Pre-season and friendlies ==
3 August 1988 Friendly	Bryne	0–5	Liverpool	Bryne
		Report	Beardsley 18'; Aldridge 39', 63'; McMahon 47'; Barnes 68'	Stadium: Bryne Stadion; Attendance: 6,460

5 August 1988 Friendly	Sunnmøre XI	1–4	Liverpool	Ålesund
	Fylling	Report	Aldridge 19', 47', 78'; Barnes 21'	Stadium: Aksla Stadion; Attendance: 8,000

8 August 1988 Friendly	Tromsø	2–2	Liverpool	Tromsø
	McCabe 43'; Pedersen 87'	Report	Aldridge 60'; Whelan 86'	Stadium: Alfheim Stadion; Attendance: 6,254

12 August 1988 Theresa Herrera Trophy	Atlético Madrid	5–1	Liverpool	A Coruña
	Baltazar 13', 36', 60'; Manolo; Futre	Report	McMahon	Stadium: Estadio Riazor; Attendance: 12,000

14 August 1988 Theresa Herrera Trophy	Real Sociedad	0–4	Liverpool	A Coruña
		Report	McMahon 51', 90'; Barnes 61'; Gillespie 79'	Stadium: Estadio Riazor; Attendance: Unknown

29 August 1988 Centenary Trophy QF	Liverpool	4–1	Nottingham Forest	Liverpool
15:00 BST	Venison 50'; Mølby 70' (pen.); Houghton 75'; Barnes 84'	Report	Webb 90'	Stadium: Anfield; Attendance: 20,141; Referee: G.M. Tyson

20 September 1988 Centenary T. SF	Arsenal	2–1	Liverpool	London
19:45 BST	Groves 33'; Marwood 82'	Report	Staunton 80'	Stadium: Highbury; Attendance: 29,135; Referee: J.E. Martin

12 February 1989 Friendly	Dundee	1–3	Liverpool	Dundee
15:30 GMT	Coyne 60' (pen.)	Report	Houghton 27'; Marsh 68', 71'	Stadium: Dens Park; Attendance: 9,311
Note: Bobby Geddes Testimonial

4 April 1989 Dubai Champ. Cup	Celtic	1–1	Liverpool	Al Nasr
BST	McGhee 12'	Report	Aldridge 76'	Stadium: Al Maktoum Stadium; Attendance: 12,000; Referee: Neil Midgley

30 April 1989 Friendly	Celtic	0–4	Liverpool	Glasgow
BST		Report	Dalglish 21'; Aldridge 63', 76'; Rush 83'	Stadium: Celtic Park; Attendance: 60,437; Referee: B. Valentine

== Competitions ==
=== First Division ===
27 August 1988 1	Charlton Athletic	0–3	Liverpool	Selhurst
		Report	Aldridge 23', 52', 54'	Stadium: Selhurst Park; Attendance: 21,389; Referee: L.C. Shapter

3 September 1988 2	Liverpool	1–0	Manchester United	Liverpool
	Mølby 38' (pen.)	Report		Stadium: Anfield; Attendance: 42,026; Referee: K.S. Hackett

10 September 1988 3	Aston Villa	1–1	Liverpool	Aston
	McInally 39'	Report	Houghton 64'	Stadium: Villa Park; Attendance: 41,409; Referee: D. Hutchinson

17 September 1988 4	Liverpool	1–1	Tottenham Hotspur	Liverpool
	Beardsley 78'	Report	Fenwick 79'	Stadium: Anfield; Attendance: 40,929; Referee: T. Mills

24 September 1988 5	Southampton	1–3	Liverpool	Southampton
	Statham 33' (pen.)	Report	Aldridge 31'; Beardsley 47'; Mølby 84' (pen.)	Stadium: The Dell; Attendance: 21,046; Referee: D. Vicars

1 October 1988 6	Liverpool	1–2	Newcastle United	Liverpool
	Gillespie 3'	Report	Hendrie 29'; Mirandinha 83' (pen.)	Stadium: Anfield; Attendance: 39,139; Referee: M.G. Peck

8 October 1988 7	Luton Town	1–0	Liverpool	Luton
	Harford 3'	Report		Stadium: Kenilworth Road; Attendance: 12,117; Referee: J.E. Martin

22 October 1988 8	Liverpool	0–0	Coventry City	Liverpool
		Report		Stadium: Anfield; Attendance: 38,742; Referee: G. Aplin

26 October 1988 9	Nottingham Forest	2–1	Liverpool	West Bridgford
	Rice 54'; Webb 59'	Report	Rush 58'	Stadium: City Ground; Attendance: 29,755; Referee: T.J. Holbrook

29 October 1988 10	West Ham United	0–2	Liverpool	London
		Report	Rush 69'; Beardsley 80'	Stadium: Boleyn Ground

5 November 1988 11	Liverpool	3–0	Middlesbrough	Liverpool
	Rush 44'; Aldridge 75'; Beardsley 87'	Report		Stadium: Anfield

12 November 1988 12	Liverpool	1–1	Millwall	Liverpool
	Nicol 15'	Report	Stephenson 10'	Stadium: Anfield

19 November 1988 13	Queens Park Rangers	0–1	Liverpool	London
		Report	Aldridge 28'	Stadium: Loftus Road

26 November 1988 14	Liverpool	1–1	Wimbledon	Liverpool
	Houghton 63'	Report	Nicol 88' (o.g.)	Stadium: Anfield

4 December 1988 15	Arsenal	1–1	Liverpool	London
	Smith 71'	Report	Barnes 46'	Stadium: Arsenal Stadium

11 December 1988 16	Liverpool	1–1	Everton	Liverpool
	Houghton 30'	Report	Clarke 60' (pen.)	Stadium: Anfield

17 December 1988 17	Liverpool	0–1	Norwich City	Liverpool
		Report	Townsend 60'	Stadium: Anfield

26 December 1988 18	Derby County	0–1	Liverpool	Derby
		Report	Rush 17'	Stadium: Baseball Ground

1 January 1989 19	Manchester United	3–1	Liverpool	Trafford
	McClair 71'; Hughes 75'; Beardsmore 77'	Report	Barnes 70'	Stadium: Old Trafford

3 January 1989 20	Liverpool	1–0	Aston Villa	Liverpool
	Whelan 66'	Report		Stadium: Anfield

14 January 1989 21	Sheffield Wednesday	2–2	Liverpool	Sheffield
	Proctor 5'; Varadi 15'	Report	Nicol 74'; Aldridge 76'	Stadium: Hillsborough Stadium

21 January 1989 22	Liverpool	2–0	Southampton	Liverpool
	Aldridge 73'; Rush 78'	Report		Stadium: Anfield

4 February 1989 23	Newcastle United	2–2	Liverpool	Newcastle upon Tyne
	Mirandinha 3'; Pingel 49'	Report	Rush 15'; Aldridge 50'	Stadium: St James' Park

1 March 1989 24	Liverpool	2–0	Charlton Athletic	Liverpool
	Beardsley 13'; Aldridge 88' (pen.)	Report		Stadium: Anfield

11 March 1989 25	Middlesbrough	0–4	Liverpool	Middlesbrough
		Report	Beardsley 19'; Houghton 37'; Aldridge 79'; McMahon 88'	Stadium: Ayresome Park

14 March 1989 26	Liverpool	5–0	Luton Town	Liverpool
	Aldridge 34' (pen.), 42', 76'; Beardsley 69'; McMahon 74'	Report		Stadium: Anfield

22 March 1989 27	Coventry City	1–3	Liverpool	Coventry
	Bannister 42'	Report	Barnes 11'; Aldridge 28'; Whelan 56'	Stadium: Highfield Road

26 March 1989 28	Tottenham Hotspur	1–2	Liverpool	Tottenham
	Fenwick 48' (pen.)	Report	Aldridge 50' (pen.); Beardsley 64'	Stadium: White Hart Lane

29 March 1989 29	Liverpool	1–0	Derby County	Liverpool
	Barnes 2'	Report		Stadium: Anfield

1 April 1989 30	Norwich City	0–1	Liverpool	Norwich
		Report	Whelan 21'	Stadium: Carrow Road

8 April 1989 31	Liverpool	5–1	Sheffield Wednesday	Liverpool
	McMahon 8'; Beardsley 42', 68'; Houghton 57'; Barnes 79'	Report	Barrick 68'	Stadium: Anfield

11 April 1989 32	Millwall	1–2	Liverpool	London
	Salman 7'	Report	Barnes 21'; Aldridge 41'	Stadium: The Den

3 May 1989 33	Everton	0–0	Liverpool	Liverpool
		Report		Stadium: Goodison Park

10 May 1989 34	Liverpool	1–0	Nottingham Forest	Liverpool
	Aldridge 81' (pen.)	Report		Stadium: Anfield

13 May 1989 35	Wimbledon	1–2	Liverpool	Wimbledon
	Hansen 18' (o.g.)	Report	Aldridge 59'; Barnes 73'	Stadium: Plough Lane

16 May 1989 36	Liverpool	2–0	Queens Park Rangers	Liverpool
	Aldridge 45'; Whelan 57'	Report		Stadium: Anfield

23 May 1989 37	Liverpool	5–1	West Ham United	Liverpool
	Aldridge 20'; Houghton 63', 80'; Rush 84'; Barnes 90'	Report	Rosenior 31'	Stadium: Anfield

26 May 1989 38	Liverpool	0–2	Arsenal	Liverpool
		Report	Smith 52'; Thomas 90'	Stadium: Anfield

=== FA Cup ===
7 January 1989 3	Carlisle United	0–3	Liverpool	Carlisle
15:00 GMT		Report	Barnes 33'; McMahon 65', 84'	Stadium: Brunton Park; Attendance: 18,556; Referee: T.J. Holbrook

29 January 1989 4	Millwall	0–2	Liverpool	London
15:05 GMT		Report	Aldridge 57'; Rush 63'	Stadium: The Old Den; Attendance: 23,615; Referee: G. Courtney

18 February 1989 5	Hull City	2–3	Liverpool	Hull
15:00 GMT	Whitehurst 32'; Edwards 44'	Report	Barnes 15'; Aldridge 52', 53'	Stadium: Boothferry Park; Attendance: 20,058; Referee: M.G. Peck

18 March 1989 6	Liverpool	4–0	Brentford	Liverpool
15:00 GMT	McMahon 15'; Barnes 62'; Beardsley 79', 82'	Report		Stadium: Anfield; Attendance: 42,376; Referee: T.J. Holbrook

15 April 1989 SF (Abandoned)	Liverpool	A–A	Nottingham Forest	Sheffield
15:00 BST				Stadium: Hillsborough Stadium; Referee: Ray Lewis

7 May 1989 SF	Liverpool	3–1	Nottingham Forest	Trafford
13:00 BST	Aldridge 3', 58'; Laws 72' (o.g.)	Report	Webb 33'	Stadium: Old Trafford; Attendance: 38,000; Referee: R.S. Lewis

20 May 1989 F	Liverpool	3–2 (a.e.t.)	Everton	London
15:00 BST	Aldridge 4'; Rush 94', 103'	Report	McCall 89', 102'	Stadium: Wembley Stadium; Attendance: 82,800; Referee: J.B. Worrall

Final

20 May 1989
15:00 BST

Liverpool	3–2 (a.e.t.)	Everton
Aldridge 4'; Rush 95', 104'	Report; Report	McCall 89', 102'

Wembley Stadium, London
Attendance: 82,800
Referee: Joe Worrall (Cheshire)

Liverpool	Everton

GK	1	(Zimbabwe) Bruce Grobbelaar
CB	2	(England) Gary Ablett
LB	3	(Republic of Ireland) Steve Staunton	(substituted off) 90'
RB	4	(Scotland) Steve Nicol
CM	5	(Republic of Ireland) Ronnie Whelan (c)
CB	6	(Scotland) Alan Hansen
CF	7	(England) Peter Beardsley
CF	8	(Republic of Ireland) John Aldridge	(substituted off) 73'
RM	9	(Republic of Ireland) Ray Houghton
LM	10	(England) John Barnes
CM	11	(England) Steve McMahon
Substitutes:
DF	12	(England) Barry Venison	(substituted on) 90'
FW	14	(Wales) Ian Rush	(substituted on) 73'
Manager:
(Scotland) Kenny Dalglish

GK	1	(Wales) Neville Southall
RB	2	(England) Neil McDonald
LB	3	(Wales) Pat Van Den Hauwe
CB	4	(Wales) Kevin Ratcliffe (c)
CB	5	(England) Dave Watson
CM	6	(England) Paul Bracewell	(substituted off) 59'
RM	7	(Scotland) Pat Nevin
CM	8	(England) Trevor Steven
CF	9	(Scotland) Graeme Sharp
CF	10	(England) Tony Cottee
LM	11	(Republic of Ireland) Kevin Sheedy	(substituted off) 78'
Substitutes:
MF	12	(Scotland) Ian Wilson	(substituted on) 78'
MF	14	(Scotland) Stuart McCall	(substituted on) 59'
Manager:
(England) Colin Harvey

Match rules

- 90 minutes
- 30 minutes of extra-time if necessary
- Replay if scores still level
- Two named substitutes
- Maximum of two substitutions

=== League Cup ===
28 September 1988 2	Liverpool	1–0	Walsall	Liverpool
19:30 BST	Gillespie 44'	Report		Stadium: Anfield; Attendance: 18,084; Referee: F. Roberts

12 October 1988 2	Walsall	1–3	Liverpool	Walsall
19:30 GMT	Shakespeare 86'	Report	Barnes 30'; Rush 72'; Mølby 83' (pen.)	Stadium: Fellows Park; Attendance: 12,015; Referee: P.A. Tyldesley

2 November 1988 3	Liverpool	1–1	Arsenal	Liverpool
19:30 GMT	Barnes 66'	Report	Rocastle 72'	Stadium: Anfield; Attendance: 31,951; Referee: G. Courtney

9 November 1988 3	Arsenal	0–0	Liverpool	London
19:45 GMT		Report		Stadium: Highbury; Attendance: 54,029; Referee: L.C. Shapter

23 November 1988 3	Arsenal	1–2	Liverpool	Aston
19:45 GMT	McMahon 61'; Aldridge 87'	Report	Merson 26'	Stadium: Villa Park; Attendance: 21,708; Referee: K.S. Hackett

30 November 1988 4	West Ham United	4–1	Liverpool	London
19:45 GMT	Ince 21', 25'; Staunton 56' (o.g.); Gale 78'	Report	Aldridge 34' (pen.)	Stadium: Boleyn Ground; Attendance: 26,971; Referee: D.J. Ashworth

=== FA Charity Shield ===
20 August 1988
15:00

Liverpool	2–1	Wimbledon
Aldridge 23', 69'	Report; Report	Fashanu 17'

Wembley Stadium, London
Attendance: 54,887
Referee: J Martin

Liverpool	Wimbledon

GK	1	(Zimbabwe) Bruce Grobbelaar
CB	2	(Scotland) Gary Gillespie
LB	3	(England) Barry Venison
RB	4	(England) Gary Ablett
CM	5	(Republic of Ireland) Ronnie Whelan
CB	6	(England) Alex Watson
CF	7	(England) Peter Beardsley
CF	8	(Republic of Ireland) John Aldridge
RM	9	(Republic of Ireland) Ray Houghton
LM	10	(England) John Barnes
CM	11	(England) Steve McMahon
Substitutes:
DF	12	(England) Charlie Boyd
DF	14	(Republic of Ireland) Steve Staunton
MF	15	(Denmark) Jan Molby
MF	16	(England) Nigel Spackman
GK	17	(England) Mike Hooper
Manager:
(Scotland) Kenny Dalglish

GK	1	(England) Simon Tracey
RB	2	(England) John Scales	Substituted off
LB	3	(Republic of Ireland) Terry Phelan
MF	4	(England) Vaughan Ryan
CB	5	(Wales) Eric Young
CB	6	(England) Peter Cawley
FW	7	(England) Terry Gibson
MF	8	(England) Carlton Fairweather
FW	9	(England) John Fashanu	Substituted off
CM	10	(Northern Ireland) Lawrie Sanchez (c)
MF	11	(England) Dennis Wise
Substitutes:
DF		(Wales) Andy Clement	Substituted on
MF		(England) Alan Cork
FW		(England) Robbie Turner	Substituted on
Manager:
(England) Bobby Gould
