= 1990–91 Liverpool F.C. season =

English football club season

Liverpool F.C.
1990–91 season
- Manager: Kenny Dalglish (until 22 February); Ronnie Moran; Graeme Souness
- First Division: 2nd
- FA Cup: Fifth round
- League Cup: Third round
- FA Charity Shield: Title shared
- Top goalscorer: League: Ian Rush (16); John Barnes (16); All: Ian Rush (26)
Home colours	Away colours

The 1990–91 season was the 99th season in Liverpool F.C.'s existence, and their 29th consecutive year in the top flight. The season saw the club unable to defend its league title and did not reclaim the title for another thirty years until the 2019–20 season.

Manager Kenny Dalglish resigned on 22 February 1991 following a dramatic 4–4 draw with local rivals Everton, citing personal reasons for his decision. With caretaker Ronnie Moran in charge, Liverpool failed to regain the lead of the First Division from Arsenal, who finished as champions having lost just one game all season. However, the club was still able to secure another top-two finish for a record 10th season in succession. Graeme Souness was appointed manager on 16 April for the five last matches of the season, resulting in three wins and two defeats.

Captain Alan Hansen, out of action for nearly a year, announced his retirement as a player not long after Dalglish's resignation.

The season had started very well for the Reds, who as defending league champions won their first eight league games, including a 4–0 victory over Manchester United at Anfield, and enjoyed a 15-match unbeaten start in the league.

It was also the final season at Anfield for striker Peter Beardsley, who enjoyed a fine start to his fourth season at the club but was then dropped in favour of new signing David Speedie halfway through the season. Both players left the club in the close season; Speedie to Blackburn Rovers and Beardsley to local rivals Everton. Also on their way out of Anfield that summer were defenders Gary Gillespie and Steve Staunton to Celtic and Aston Villa respectively. The close season saw Liverpool pay a national record £2.9million for Derby County striker Dean Saunders, who had been one of the First Division's top scorers in 1990–91 despite his team being relegated in bottom place. A further £2.5million went to the East Midlanders for England defender Mark Wright. An outlay of £1.25million also went on midfielder Mark Walters, who followed Souness to Anfield from Rangers.

Just weeks before his resignation, Dalglish invested for the future with a move for 17-year-old AFC Bournemouth midfielder Jamie Redknapp, while fellow teenage midfielder Steve McManaman made his first two senior appearances during the season.

== Events of the season ==
=== August ===
Liverpool's defence of their record 18th top division league title began on 25 August 1990 at Bramall Lane, where they defeated newly promoted Sheffield United 3–1. A visit to Wembley a week earlier for the FA Charity Shield had seen Liverpool share the honour with FA Cup holders Manchester United in a 1–1 draw.

=== September ===
September ended with Liverpool top of the First Division, having won all of their seven opening league games, including a 3–2 win at Goodison Park in the Merseyside derby in which Peter Beardsley scored twice, and even more impressively a 4–0 demolition of Manchester United at Anfield in which Beardsley hit a hat-trick. Beardsley ended the month as the First Division's top goalscorer with seven goals in as many games.

=== October ===
Liverpool's winning start to the season reached an eighth successive game as they triumphed 2–0 at home to struggling Derby County, and in the next game they dropped points for the first time when Norwich City held them to a 1–1 draw at Carrow Road. The month ended in disappointment when Manchester United dumped them out of the Football League Cup with a 3–1 defeat at Old Trafford.

=== November ===
Peter Beardsley's excellent form continued as he reached the 10-goal mark in the First Division on 10 November, finding the net in a 4–0 home win over Luton Town. It was also a fine month for Ian Rush, who was on the scoresheet twice against both Luton Town and Tottenham Hotspur. Liverpool remained comfortably in the lead at the top of the First Division as November ended.

=== December ===
Liverpool's unbeaten start to the season ended after 14 games when they crashed 3–0 to their nearest challengers Arsenal at Highbury on 2 December, but their lead of the First Division remained intact. The month ended with a second defeat at Crystal Palace, slowly emerging as outsiders in the title race, but also included wins over Sheffield United and Southampton.

=== January ===
The new year brought two significant signings for Liverpool, in the shape of experienced striker David Speedie from Coventry City and promising 17-year-old midfielder Jamie Redknapp from AFC Bournemouth. There were just three league games for the Reds this month, starting with a 3–0 win over Leeds United at Anfield on New Year's Day, followed by draws against Aston Villa and Wimbledon.

The FA Cup quest got off to a rocky start, with the Reds needing replays to see off Second Division competition in the shape of Blackburn Rovers in the third round and Brighton & Hove Albion in the fourth. However, Arsenal had overtaken the Reds as league leaders by the end of the month.

=== February ===
Kenny Dalglish stunned the football world on 22 February 1991 by suddenly announcing his resignation as Liverpool manager after nearly six years in charge, during which time he had guided them to three league titles, two FA Cups, and they had never finished lower than runners-up in the league. They were also in contention for the double when he handed in his resignation, having just forced a second replay against Everton in the fifth round following a goalless draw at Anfield and a 4–4 thriller at Goodison Park less than 48 hours before the bombshell was dropped. They had also beaten Everton in the league earlier in the month.

Long-serving coach Ronnie Moran was put in temporary charge of the first team until a permanent successor could be found. However, the month ended with Everton finally getting the better of the Reds in the second replay of the FA Cup fifth round.

=== March ===
Arsenal extended their lead over the Reds with a 1–0 win at Anfield on 3 March, but wins in the next three games (including a 7–1 demolition of bottom club Derby County at The Baseball Ground)kept the Reds in contention for a 19th league title.

=== April ===
13 goals and three straight wins meant that Liverpool ended the month still capable of catching Arsenal in the race for the league title, giving new manager Graeme Souness every chance of a dream return to the club he served so well as a player.

=== May ===
Successive defeats to Chelsea and Nottingham Forest ended Liverpool's hopes of another league title as the championship trophy headed back to Arsenal, who had seized it from Liverpool's grasp with the last kick of the season two years earlier. The last league action of the season was a 2–0 home win over Tottenham Hotspur, and the Reds at least had the consolation of a record 10th successive top two finish.

Much speculation surrounded Anfield at the end of the season regarding who would be joining Liverpool and who might be leaving. The future of Peter Beardsley at Anfield was looking particularly bleak; after an excellent start to the season which saw him hit the back of the net 11 times in the league before the end of November, he had struggled to hold down his place in the first team due to competition from Ronny Rosenthal and then David Speedie for the position as Ian Rush's strike partner. There was also talk that David Speedie could soon be on his way out of Anfield just months after arriving as Souness looked to sign a new striker, with Mo Johnston of Rangers and Dean Saunders of Derby County being two names most strongly linked with a move to Anfield. Following the retirement of Alan Hansen in the centre of defence, Derby County's Mark Wright also became a transfer target. Midfielder Craig Johnston, who had announced his retirement from playing three years earlier in order to care for his sister following a serious accident, was offered the chance of reviving his career by Souness.

== Squad ==
=== Goalkeepers ===
- (Zimbabwe) Bruce Grobbelaar
- (England) Mike Hooper
- (England) Robbie Holcroft

=== Defenders ===
- (England) Gary Ablett
- (England) David Burrows
- (Scotland) Gary Gillespie
- (England) Alex Watson
- (Sweden) Glenn Hysén
- (Scotland) Steve Nicol
- (Republic of Ireland) Steve Staunton
- (England) Barry Venison
- (England) Nick Tanner

=== Midfielders ===
- (Scotland) Don Hutchison
- (England) Steve McMahon
- (England) Steve McManaman
- (Republic of Ireland) Ronnie Whelan
- (Republic of Ireland) Ray Houghton
- (England) Mike Marsh
- (Denmark) Jan Mølby
- (England) Jamie Redknapp
- (England) Jimmy Carter
- (Northern Ireland) Jim Magilton

=== Attackers ===
- (England) Peter Beardsley
- (Wales) Ian Rush
- (Scotland) David Speedie
- (Israel) Ronnie Rosenthal
- (Republic of Ireland) Tony Cousins
- (England) John Barnes

== Squad statistics ==
=== Appearances and goals ===
No.	Pos	Nat	Player	Total		Division 1		FA Cup		Charity Shield		League Cup	
No.	Pos	Nat	Player	Apps	Goals	Apps	Goals	Apps	Goals	Apps	Goals	Apps	Goals
	DF	(England) ENG	Gary Ablett	31	0	23+0	0	5+1	0	1+0	0	1+0	0
	MF	(England) ENG	John Barnes	45	18	35+0	16	7+0	1	1+0	1	2+0	0
	FW	(England) ENG	Peter Beardsley	35	13	24+3	11	2+3	2	1+0	0	2+0	0
	DF	(England) ENG	David Burrows	44	0	34+1	0	5+0	0	1+0	0	3+0	0
	MF	(England) ENG	Jimmy Carter	7	0	2+3	0	2+0	0	0+0	0	0+0	0
	DF	(Scotland) SCO	Gary Gillespie	35	2	30+0	1	2+0	0	0+0	0	3+0	1
	GK	(Zimbabwe) ZIM	Bruce Grobbelaar	42	0	31+0	0	7+0	0	1+0	0	3+0	0
	GK	(England) ENG	Mike Hooper	7	0	7+0	0	0+0	0	0+0	0	0+0	0
	MF	(Republic of Ireland) IRL	Ray Houghton	39	10	31+1	7	3+0	1	1+0	0	3+0	2
	DF	(Sweden) SWE	Glenn Hysén	40	0	32+0	0	5+0	0	1+0	0	2+0	0
	MF	(England) ENG	Mike Marsh	3	0	1+1	0	0+0	0	0+0	0	1+0	0
	MF	(England) ENG	Steve McMahon	29	3	22+0	0	4+0	2	1+0	0	2+0	1
	MF	(England) ENG	Steve McManaman	3	0	0+2	0	0+1	0	0+0	0	0+0	0
	MF	(Denmark) DEN	Jan Mølby	34	9	22+3	9	5+2	0	0+0	0	1+1	0
	MF	(Scotland) SCO	Steve Nicol	44	3	35+0	3	7+0	0	0+0	0	2+0	0
	FW	(Israel) ISR	Ronny Rosenthal	23	5	4+12	5	3+0	0	0+1	0	0+3	0
	FW	(Wales) WAL	Ian Rush	48	26	37+0	16	7+0	5	1+0	0	3+0	5
	FW	(Scotland) SCO	David Speedie	14	6	8+4	6	1+1	0	0+0	0	0+0	0
	DF	(Republic of Ireland) IRL	Steve Staunton	33	2	20+4	0	7+0	1	0+0	0	2+0	1
	DF	(England) ENG	Barry Venison	14	0	6+0	0	4+1	0	1+0	0	2+0	0
	MF	(Republic of Ireland) IRL	Ronnie Whelan	17	1	14+0	1	1+0	0	1+0	0	1+0	0

=== Top scorers ===
- (Wales) Ian Rush 16
- (England) John Barnes 16
- (England) Peter Beardsley 11
- (Denmark) Jan Mølby 9
- (Republic of Ireland) Ray Houghton 7
- (Scotland) David Speedie 6
- (Israel) Ronnie Rosenthal 5

== League table ==
Pos	Team	Pld	W	D	L	GF	GA	GD	Pts	Qualification or relegation
1	Arsenal (C)	38	24	13	1	74	18	+56	83 (Note: Arsenal deducted two points; Manchester United deducted one point due to a brawl in a game between both teams.)	Qualification for the European Cup first round
2	Liverpool	38	23	7	8	77	40	+37	76	Qualification for the UEFA Cup first round
3	Crystal Palace	38	20	9	9	50	41	+9	69	
4	Leeds United	38	19	7	12	65	47	+18	64	
5	Manchester City	38	17	11	10	64	53	+11	62	

Source: World Football
Rules for classification: 1) Points; 2) Goal difference; 3) Goals scored
(C) Champions

== Matches ==
=== FA Charity Shield ===
18 August FA Charity Shield	Liverpool	1–1	Manchester United	London
	Barnes 51' (pen.)	Report	Blackmore 44'	Stadium: Wembley Stadium; Attendance: 66,558; Referee: George Courtney

=== First Division ===
25 August 1	Sheffield United	1–3	Liverpool	Sheffield
	Deane 60'	Report	Barnes 59'; Houghton 65'; Rush 88'	Stadium: Bramall Lane; Attendance: 27,009; Referee: Vic Callow

28 August 2	Liverpool	2–0	Nottingham Forest	Liverpool
	Rush 52'; Beardsley 83'	Report		Stadium: Anfield; Attendance: 33,363; Referee: Peter Tyldesley

1 September 3	Liverpool	2–1	Aston Villa	Liverpool
	Beardsley 12'; Barnes 87'	Report	Platt 26'	Stadium: Anfield; Attendance: 38,061; Referee: Keith Hackett

8 September 4	Wimbledon	1–2	Liverpool	London
	Cork 74'	Report	Barnes 27'; Whelan 31'	Stadium: Plough Lane; Attendance: 12,364; Referee: R. Groves

16 September 5	Liverpool	4–0	Manchester United	Liverpool
	Beardsley 11', 32', 81'; Barnes 44'	Report		Stadium: Anfield; Attendance: 35,726; Referee: Lester Shapter

22 September 6	Everton	2–3	Liverpool	Liverpool
	Hinchcliffe 71'; McCall 84'	Report	Beardsley 36', 68'; Barnes 37' (pen.)	Stadium: Goodison Park; Attendance: 39,847; Referee: Roger Milford

29 September 7	Sunderland	0–1	Liverpool	Sunderland
		Report	Houghton 44'	Stadium: Roker Park; Attendance: 31,107; Referee: T. West

6 October 8	Liverpool	2–0	Derby County	Liverpool
	Houghton 37'; Beardsley 85'	Report		Stadium: Anfield; Attendance: 37,036; Referee: Terry Holbrook

20 October 9	Norwich City	1–1	Liverpool	Norwich
	Fox 7'	Report	Gillespie 2'	Stadium: Carrow Road; Attendance: 21,275; Referee: John Moules

27 October 10	Liverpool	2–0	Chelsea	Liverpool
	Rush 3'; Nicol 17'	Report		Stadium: Anfield; Attendance: 38,463; Referee: Keren Barratt

4 November 11	Tottenham Hotspur	1–3	Liverpool	London
	Lineker 50'	Report	Rush 38', 48'; Beardsley 67'	Stadium: White Hart Lane; Attendance: 35,033; Referee: George Courtney

10 November 12	Liverpool	4–0	Luton Town	Liverpool
	Rush 5', 39'; Mølby 9' (pen.); Beardsley 71'	Report		Stadium: Anfield; Attendance: 35,207; Referee: Gerald Ashby

17 November 13	Coventry City	0–1	Liverpool	Coventry
		Report	Beardsley 73'	Stadium: Highfield Road; Attendance: 22,571; Referee: Ken Redfern

24 November 14	Liverpool	2–2	Manchester City	Liverpool
	Rush 82'; Rosenthal 86'	Report	Ward 62'; Quinn 89'	Stadium: Anfield; Attendance: 37,847; Referee: Philip Don

2 December 15	Arsenal	3–0	Liverpool	London
	Merson 21'; Dixon 46' (pen.); Smith 88'	Report		Stadium: Highbury; Attendance: 40,419; Referee: Allan Gunn

15 December 16	Liverpool	2–0	Sheffield United	Liverpool
	Barnes 61'; Rush 75'	Report		Stadium: Anfield; Attendance: 33,516; Referee: John Lloyd

22 December 17	Liverpool	3–2	Southampton	Liverpool
	Rosenthal 33', 43'; Houghton 83'	Report	Wallace 18', 48'	Stadium: Anfield; Attendance: 31,894; Referee: Robbie Hart

26 December 18	Queens Park Rangers	1–1	Liverpool	London
	Falco 67'	Report	Barnes 49'	Stadium: Loftus Road; Attendance: 17,848; Referee: J. Martin

30 December 19	Crystal Palace	1–0	Liverpool	London
	Bright 44'	Report		Stadium: Selhurst Park; Attendance: 26,280

1 January 20	Liverpool	3-0	Leeds United	Liverpool
	Barnes 7'; Rosenthal 33'; Rush 89'	Report		Stadium: Anfield; Attendance: 36,975; Referee: Peter Tyldesley

12 January 21	Aston Villa	0–0	Liverpool	Birmingham
		Report		Stadium: Villa Park; Attendance: 40,026; Referee: Jim Borrett

19 January 22	Liverpool	1–1	Wimbledon	Liverpool
15:00	Barnes 33'	Report	Barton 81'	Stadium: Anfield; Attendance: 35,030; Referee: Howard King

3 February 23	Manchester United	1–1	Liverpool	Manchester
	Bruce 26'	Report	Speedie 39'	Stadium: Old Trafford; Attendance: 43,690; Referee: Ray Lewis

9 February 24	Liverpool	3–1	Everton	Liverpool
	Mølby 17'; Speedie 49', 53'	Report	Nevin 45'	Stadium: Anfield; Attendance: 38,127; Referee: Lester Shapter

23 February 25	Luton Town	3–1	Liverpool	Luton
	Black 47'; Dowie 55', 90'	Report	Mølby 13' (pen.)	Stadium: Kenilworth Road; Attendance: 12,032; Referee: D. Ashworth

3 March 26	Liverpool	0–1	Arsenal	Liverpool
		Report	Merson	Stadium: Anfield; Attendance: 37,221; Referee: Terry Holbrook

9 March 27	Manchester City	0–3	Liverpool	Manchester
		Report	Mølby 39' (pen.), 44' (pen.); Barnes 86'	Stadium: Maine Road; Attendance: 35,150; Referee: George Courtney

16 March 28	Liverpool	2–1	Sunderland	Liverpool
	Rush 27'; Owers 44' (o.g.)	Report	Armstrong 19'	Stadium: Anfield; Attendance: 37,582; Referee: Keith Hackett

23 March 29	Derby County	1–7	Liverpool	Derby
	Saunders 19'	Report	Mølby 7' (pen.); Barnes 23', 47'; Rush 39'; Nicol 56', 63'; Houghton 90'	Stadium: Baseball Ground; Attendance: 20,531; Referee: Philip Don

30 March 30	Liverpool	1–3	Queens Park Rangers	Liverpool
	Mølby 64' (pen.)	Report	Ferdinand 10'; Wegerle 45'; Wilson 83'	Stadium: Anfield; Attendance: 37,251; Referee: Mike Reed

1 April 31	Southampton	1–0	Liverpool	Southampton
	Le Tissier 4'	Report		Stadium: The Dell; Attendance: 20,255; Referee: Allan Gunn

9 April 32	Liverpool	1–1	Coventry City	Liverpool
	Rush 20'	Report	Gynn 34'	Stadium: Anfield; Attendance: 31,063; Referee: David Elleray

13 April 33	Leeds United	4–5	Liverpool	Leeds
	Chapman 68', 81', 88'; Shutt 77'	Report	Houghton 11'; Mølby 16' (pen.); Speedie 25'; Barnes 28', 79'	Stadium: Elland Road; Attendance: 31,460; Referee: Ken Redfern

20 April 34	Liverpool	3–0	Norwich City	Liverpool
	Barnes 31'; Houghton 36'; Rush 85'	Report		Stadium: Anfield; Attendance: 37,065; Referee: Vic Callow

23 April 35	Liverpool	3–0	Crystal Palace	Liverpool
	Rush 41'; Barnes 55'; McGoldrick 88' (o.g.)	Report		Stadium: Anfield; Attendance: 36,767; Referee: Keren Barratt

4 May 36	Chelsea	4–2	Liverpool	London
	Dixon 8', 77'; Wise 32' (pen.); Durie 87'	Report	Speedie 62'; Rosenthal 72'	Stadium: Stamford Bridge; Attendance: 32,266; Referee: Stephen Lodge

6 May 37	Nottingham Forest	2–1	Liverpool	Nottingham
	Clough 13'; Woan 64'	Report	Mølby 56' (pen.)	Stadium: City Ground; Attendance: 26,151; Referee: J. Martin

11 May 38	Liverpool	2–0	Tottenham Hotspur	Liverpool
	Rush 41'; Speedie 48'	Report		Stadium: Anfield; Attendance: 36,192; Referee: Roger Milford

=== FA Cup ===
5 January 3rd Round	Blackburn Rovers	1–1	Liverpool	Blackburn
	Garner 46'	Report	Atkins 90' (o.g.)	Stadium: Ewood Park; Attendance: 18,524

8 January 3rd Round Replay	Liverpool	3–0	Blackburn Rovers	Liverpool
	Houghton 15'; Rush 23'; Staunton 82'	Report		Stadium: Anfield; Attendance: 34,175

26 January 4th Round	Liverpool	2–2	Brighton & Hove Albion	Liverpool
	Rush 48', 55'	Report	Small 72'; Byrne 74'	Stadium: Anfield; Attendance: 32,670

30 January 4th Round Replay	Brighton & Hove Albion	2–3	Liverpool	Brighton
	Small 36'; Byrne 98'	Report	McMahon 10', 114'; Rush 106'	Stadium: Goldstone Ground; Attendance: 14,392

17 February 5th Round	Liverpool	0–0	Everton	Liverpool
		Report		Stadium: Anfield; Attendance: 38,323

20 February 5th Round Replay	Everton	4–4	Liverpool	Liverpool
	Sharp 48', 73'; Cottee 89', 113'	Report	Beardsley 37', 71'; Rush 77'; Barnes 103'	Stadium: Goodison Park; Attendance: 37,766

27 February 5th Round 2nd Replay	Everton	1–0	Liverpool	Liverpool
	D. Watson 12'	Report		Stadium: Goodison Park; Attendance: 40,201

=== Football League Cup ===
25 September 2nd Round 1st Leg	Liverpool	5–1	Crewe Alexandra	Liverpool
	McMahon 30'; Gillespie 31'; Houghton 67'; Rush 72', 85'	Report	Sussex 8'	Stadium: Anfield; Attendance: 17,228; Referee: Stephen Lodge

9 October 2nd Round 2nd Leg	Crewe Alexandra	1–4	Liverpool	Crewe
	Sussex 86'	Report	Rush 18', 48', 74'; Staunton 42'	Stadium: Gresty Road; Attendance: 7,200; Referee: Paul Harrison

31 October 3rd Round	Manchester United	3–1	Liverpool	Manchester
	Bruce 36' (pen.); Hughes 37'; Sharpe 81'	Report	Houghton 83'	Stadium: Old Trafford; Attendance: 42,033; Referee: Joe Worrall

== Recap ==
Competition	Result	Top Scorer
First Division	Runners-Up	(England) John Barnes, 16 (Wales) Ian Rush, 16
FA Cup	Fifth Round	(Wales) Ian Rush, 5
League Cup	Third Round	(Wales) Ian Rush, 5
Charity Shield	Title shared	(England) John Barnes, 1
Overall		(Wales) Ian Rush, 26
