= 1987–88 Wimbledon F.C. season =

Wimbledon
1987–88 season
- Chairman: Sam Hammam
- Manager: Bobby Gould
- Stadium: Plough Lane
- First Division: 7th
- FA Cup: Winners
- League Cup: Fourth round
- Full Members Cup: Third round
- Top goalscorer: League: John Fashanu (14); All: John Fashanu (21)
Home colours

During the 1987–88 English football season, Wimbledon F.C. competed in the Football League First Division. It was Wimbledon's second consecutive season in the top flight and eleventh consecutive season in the Football League. They ended the season as FA Cup winners and finished seventh in the league. It was their first season under the management of Bobby Gould, who had been appointed following the resignation of Dave Bassett at the end of the previous season.

== Season summary ==
Wimbledon continued to exceed expectations in the First Division, finishing in seventh in the final table, one place lower than their sixth place the previous season. However, Wimbledon's greatest success during the season, perhaps in their entire history, came in the FA Cup, defeating West Bromwich Albion (4–1, home), Mansfield Town (1-2, away), Newcastle United (1-3, away), Watford (2–1, home) and Luton Town (2-1, neutral) to reach their first ever FA Cup Final, against that season's league champions Liverpool. Wimbledon took a lead in the 37th minute when Lawrie Sanchez scored a looping header from Dennis Wise's free kick on the left. Liverpool created many chances, with Peter Beardsley finding the net but his goal being disallowed, but failed to pull a goal back, with Dave Beasant saving a penalty from John Aldridge after Clive Goodyear was (incorrectly) adjudged to have fouled inside the box; Beasant was the first goalkeeper to ever save a penalty in an FA Cup final at Wembley. Wimbledon held on to win their first (and only) FA Cup. Due to the ban on English clubs competing in European competition as a result of the Heysel disaster, Wimbledon were denied the opportunity to compete in the Cup Winners' Cup.

== Kit ==
Wimbledon's kit was manufactured by Spall and sponsored by Truman. Wimbledon's kit for the FA Cup final were sponsored by Danish brewery Carlsberg, who had signed a deal to sponsor Wimbledon's kits for the next season.

== First-team squad ==
Note: Flags indicate national team as defined under FIFA eligibility rules; some limited exceptions apply. Players may hold more than one non-FIFA nationality.

Pos.	Nation	Player
GK	ENG	Dave Beasant (captain)
GK	ENG	Simon Tracey
DF	ENG	Kevin Bedford
DF	ENG	Peter Cawley
DF	ENG	Brian Gayle
DF	ENG	Clive Goodyear
DF	ENG	John Scales
DF	ENG	Andy Thorn
DF	ENG	Eric Young
DF	IRL	Terry Phelan
MF	ENG	Alan Cork
MF	ENG	Wally Downes
MF	ENG	Carlton Fairweather
MF	ENG	John Gannon

Pos.	Nation	Player
MF	ENG	Ian Hazel
MF	WAL	Vinnie Jones
MF	ENG	Paul Miller
MF	ENG	Vaughan Ryan
MF	NIR	Lawrie Sanchez
MF	ENG	Dennis Wise
FW	ENG	Laurie Cunningham
FW	ENG	John Fashanu
FW	ENG	Paul Fishenden
FW	ENG	Terry Gibson
DF	ENG	Mick Smith
DF	ENG	Andy Clement
FW	ENG	Andy Sayer
MF	ENG	Steve Galliers

== Staff ==
- Manager: Bobby Gould
- Assistant manager: Don Howe
- Chief scout: Ron Suart
- Youth team manager: Dave Kemp
- Physiotherapist: Steve Allen
- Kit man: Sid Neal, Joe Dillon

== Transfers ==
=== In ===
- (England) Terry Gibson from Manchester United, £200,000, 24 August

== Results ==
=== First Division ===
==== October ====
- 17 October: Luton Town 2-0 Wimbledon

==== November ====
- 4 November: Wimbledon 1-1 Liverpool
- 7 November: Wimbledon 2-0 Southampton
- 14 November: Coventry 3-3 Wimbledon
- 21 November: Wimbledon 2-1 Manchester United
- 28 November: Chelsea 1-1 Wimbledon

==== December ====
- 5 December: Wimbledon 1-1 Nottingham Forest
- 12 December: Sheffield Wednesday 1-0 Wimbledon
- 18 December: Wimbledon 1-0 Norwich City
- 26 December: West Ham United 1-2 Wimbledon
- 28 December: Wimbledon 3-1 Arsenal

==== January ====
- 1 January: Wimbledon 2-1 Derby County
- 2 January: Oxford United 2-5 Wimbledon

==== March ====
- 5 March: Wimbledon 2-0 Luton Town

==== May ====
- 9 May: Manchester United 2-1 Wimbledon

==== Unknown date ====
- Wimbledon 4-1 Charlton Athletic
- Wimbledon 2-2 Chelsea
- Wimbledon 1-2 Coventry City
- Wimbledon 1-1 Everton
- Wimbledon 0-0 Newcastle United
- Wimbledon 1-0 Norwich City
- Wimbledon 1-1 Nottingham Forest
- Wimbledon 1-1 Oxford United
- Wimbledon 2-2 Portsmouth
- Wimbledon 1-2 Queens Park Rangers
- Wimbledon 1-1 Sheffield Wednesday
- Wimbledon 3-0 Tottenham Hotspur
- Wimbledon 1-2 Watford
- Wimbledon 1-1 West Ham United
- Arsenal 3-0 Wimbledon
- Charlton Athletic 1-1 Wimbledon
- Derby County 0-1 Wimbledon
- Everton 2-2 Wimbledon
- Liverpool 2-1 Wimbledon (matchday 31)
- Newcastle United 1-2 Wimbledon
- Norwich City 0-1 Wimbledon
- Nottingham Forest 0-0 Wimbledon
- Portsmouth 2-1 Wimbledon
- Queens Park Rangers 1-0 Wimbledon
- Southampton 2-2 Wimbledon
- Tottenham Hotspur 0-3 Wimbledon
- Watford 1-0 Wimbledon

Pos	Club	Pld	W	D	L	GF	GA	GD	Pts
6	Arsenal	40	18	12	10	58	39	+19	66
7	Wimbledon	40	14	15	11	58	47	+11	57
8	Newcastle United	40	14	14	12	55	53	+2	56

Pld = Matches played; W = Matches won; D = Matches drawn; L = Matches lost; GF = Goals for; GA = Goals against; GD = Goal difference; Pts = Points
