= 1988 FA Charity Shield =

- The match programme cover
Liverpool	Wimbledon
2	1
- Date: 20 August 1988
- Venue: Wembley Stadium, London
- Referee: J Martin
- Attendance: 54,887

The 1988 FA Charity Shield was the 66th Charity Shield, a football match contested by the winners of the previous season's Football League and FA Cup competitions. The match was played on 20 August 1988 between 1987–88 Football League champions Liverpool and 1987–88 FA Cup winners Wimbledon.

The fixture was a rematch of previous season's FA Cup final, and Liverpool gained some small revenge for that defeat with a 2–1 win, with both of their goals coming from John Aldridge – the player whose penalty in the final, three months earlier had been saved. However, the man who had saved his penalty – Wimbledon's goalkeeper Dave Beasant – had gone, transferred to Newcastle United in the close season, and his place for this game was taken by Simon Tracey.

Wimbledon had taken the lead in the 17th minute with a John Fashanu header from a Dennis Wise cross from the right. Liverpool equalized with John Aldridge scoring after 23 minutes. Wimbledon goalkeeper Simon Tracey had come out of the penalty box to clear the ball, but the ball was quickly passed to Aldridge from John Barnes who rolled the ball into the empty net from the edge of the penalty area. Liverpool took the lead after 69 minutes with Aldridge again scoring after a cross from John Barnes. Barnes had made a long run down the left and crossed to Aldridge who controlled the ball with his left leg before volleying with his right to the net.

== Match details ==
20 August 1988
15:00

Liverpool	2–1	Wimbledon
Aldridge 23', 69'	Report	Fashanu 17'

Wembley Stadium, London
Attendance: 54,887
Referee: J Martin

Liverpool	Wimbledon

GK	1	(Zimbabwe) Bruce Grobbelaar
CB	2	(Scotland) Gary Gillespie
LB	3	(England) Barry Venison
RB	4	(England) Gary Ablett
CM	5	(Republic of Ireland) Ronnie Whelan (c)
CB	6	(England) Alex Watson
CF	7	(England) Peter Beardsley
CF	8	(Republic of Ireland) John Aldridge
RM	9	(Republic of Ireland) Ray Houghton
LM	10	(England) John Barnes
CM	11	(England) Steve McMahon
Substitutes:
DF	12	(England) Charlie Boyd
DF	14	(Republic of Ireland) Steve Staunton
MF	15	(Denmark) Jan Molby
MF	16	(England) Nigel Spackman
GK	17	(England) Mike Hooper
Manager:
(Scotland) Kenny Dalglish

GK	1	(England) Simon Tracey
RB	2	(England) John Scales	Substituted off
LB	3	(Republic of Ireland) Terry Phelan
MF	4	(England) Vaughan Ryan
CB	5	(Wales) Eric Young
CB	6	(England) Peter Cawley
FW	7	(England) Terry Gibson
MF	8	(England) Carlton Fairweather
FW	9	(England) John Fashanu	Substituted off
CM	10	(Northern Ireland) Lawrie Sanchez (c)
MF	11	(England) Dennis Wise
Substitutes:
DF		(Wales) Andy Clement	Substituted on
MF		(England) Alan Cork
FW		(England) Robbie Turner	Substituted on
Manager:
(England) Bobby Gould
