= Ronnie Whelan =

Irish soccer player & manager (born 1961)

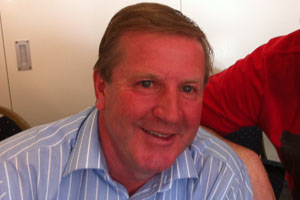
- Whelan in 2013

Personal information
- Full name: Ronald Andrew Whelan
- Date of birth: 25 September 1961 (age 65)
- Place of birth: Dublin, Ireland
- Height: 1.75 m (5 ft 9 in)
- Position: Midfielder

Youth career
- 1967–1977: Home Farm

Senior career*
Years	Team	Apps	(Gls)
1977–1979	Home Farm	45	(7)
1979–1994	Liverpool	362	(46)
1994–1996	Southend United	34	(1)
Total		441	(54)

International career
1979	League of Ireland XI	1	(1)
1981	Republic of Ireland U21	1	(0)
1994	Republic of Ireland B	1	(0)
1981–1995	Republic of Ireland	53	(3)

Managerial career
- 1995–1997: Southend United
- 1998–1999: Panionios
- 2000–2001: Olympiakos Nicosia
- 2002: Apollon Limassol
- * Club domestic league appearances and goals

Ronald Andrew Whelan (/ˈrɒniː ˈhwiːlən/; born 25 September 1961) is an Irish former professional football player who played as a midfielder and sometimes as a defender. He played an integral role in the dominant Liverpool side that won a wealth of titles in the 1980s. He was at the club from 1979 until 1994, scoring a number of vital goals. In 100 Players Who Shook The Kop, a poll of 110,000 Liverpool fans conducted by Liverpool's official website, Whelan came in 30th.

Whelan finished his career at Southend United, where he was also player-manager. He has also managed in Greece and Cyprus, with Panionios, Olympiakos Nicosia and Apollon Limassol.

Whelan was an important member of the Republic of Ireland national team at one UEFA European Football Championship (1988) and also appeared at two World Cups (1990 and 1994). He played a total of 53 times for the national side between 1981 and 1995.

Since retirement he has begun a media career, and is a regular contributor to RTÉ Sport in Ireland.

== Early life ==
Whelan was born into a family of footballers from Finglas, Dublin, Ireland; his father, Ronnie Sr., was an Irish international and a key member of the successful St Patrick's Athletic side of the late 1950s and early 1960s. His brother Paul Whelan played for Bohemian FC and Shamrock Rovers.

Whelan was a skilful and industrious midfield player, who began playing with Home Farm at the age of six. After an unsuccessful trial period for Manchester United (for whom he made one appearance for their 'B' team, scoring in a 7–4 win over Liverpool 'B', on 20 August 1977), made his League of Ireland debut for Home Farm on his 16th birthday at Tolka Park.

Whelan scored for a League of Ireland XI against the Basque Country at the San Mamés in August 1979

== Liverpool ==
Whelan was signed for Liverpool by Bob Paisley for a bargain £35,000 on 19 September 1979, a few days before his 18th birthday and made his debut 18 months later, on 3 April 1981, scoring his first goal in the 27th minute of the 3–0 league win over Stoke City at Anfield. This would be Whelan's one and only appearance of the season for the first team, as Whelan spent much of his first few months at the club in the reserves.

The following season Whelan won his place on the left side of the Liverpool midfield, ending the Anfield career of Ray Kennedy and also taking over his No. 5 shirt. It was an excellent season for Whelan, as he settled into first team football and helped Liverpool to another League championship. They also retained the League Cup with victory over Tottenham Hotspur at Wembley, with Whelan scoring twice in the 3–1 win, including the equalizer late in regulation time and the winner in extra-time.

In 1983, Liverpool retained these two trophies and Whelan again tallied in the League Cup final, scoring the winner with a curving shot into the Manchester United net in extra-time to secure a 2–1 win. Whelan then played a major role in Liverpool's treble of League title, League Cup and European Cup of 1984, although he was injured for part of this season.

Liverpool's trophyless season in 1985, culminating in the disaster at Heysel, was followed by a much more successful season for Whelan and Liverpool, under the new management of Kenny Dalglish. Liverpool clinched another League title and added the FA Cup, with Whelan setting up two of the goals in a 3–1 victory over Merseyside rivals Everton, the first time the two had met in an FA Cup final. It was only the third League and FA Cup "double" of the 20th century. Whelan put in some fine performances in the league as well, most notably a hat-trick in the 5–0 home win over Coventry City on 12 April 1986.

Liverpool ended the following season trophyless, losing the League Cup Final to Arsenal and coming second to Everton in the league. The following year, Whelan switched to a central role following the arrival of England winger John Barnes at Anfield, supplementing the new strike partnership of Peter Beardsley and John Aldridge. This season saw Liverpool play an exciting brand of football and they won the league title with just two defeats all season. They also reached the final of the FA Cup, although Whelan missed out on the final as Nigel Spackman, who had won his place in the team when Whelan was injured earlier in the season was chosen ahead of him. Liverpool lost the final 1–0 to Wimbledon.

An injury to club captain Alan Hansen meant that Whelan spent much of the 1988–89 season as captain of Liverpool, a role he relished as the club progressed to another challenge for a "double". Then the Hillsborough disaster happened, and Whelan played a key role in leading the team on and off the pitch in a difficult time. When Hansen recovered, Whelan maintained the captaincy for continuity purposes and it was he who lifted the FA Cup after a 3–2 win over derby rivals Everton. However, he missed the chance to do the same with the League title, with Arsenal taking the championship thanks to a last-minute goal from Michael Thomas on the final day of the season on goal difference. This meant that for the second year running Liverpool narrowly missed out on a unique second double.

Liverpool won the League again in 1990 with Whelan playing a central role for much of the season, although he missed the last few games due to the first of several injuries which would severely hamper the rest of his Liverpool career. One of Whelan's more forgettable moments came that season, when in a match at Old Trafford, an unmarked Whelan chipped a backpass from 30 yards over goalkeeper Bruce Grobbelaar and into the net. It is considered to be one of the most bizarre own goals in top flight history. However, Liverpool still won the match 2–1.

Whelan remained a first team regular the following season, until an injury sustained in February 1991 against Everton ruled him out for the rest of the campaign. For the rest of his Anfield career, Whelan was injured as often as he played. He missed much of the 1991–92 season with injury, although returned to score a crucial equaliser against Portsmouth in the FA Cup semi-final, forcing a replay which Liverpool won on penalties. However, although he had recovered from another minor injury in time for the successful Cup final against Sunderland, he didn't feature, his place going to Jan Mølby.

When Whelan was fit, manager Graeme Souness gave him many more first team opportunities in the new FA Premier League for the 1992–93 and 1993–94 seasons, but it was a disappointing period for the club, as they finished sixth in the Premier League in 1993 and eighth in 1994. By this time, Souness had been replaced as manager by Roy Evans. At the end of the 1993–94 season, Evans decided not to offer Whelan a new contract.

In all, Whelan played 493 first team games for Liverpool, scoring 73 goals in combined league and cup matches. He scored 46 league goals in fourteen consecutive seasons, 37 of them in his first seven years when he played a more attacking role. He won six League championship title medals, three FA Cups, a European Cup and three League Cup medals in his time with the club.

== International career ==
By the age of 20 Whelan had represented the Republic of Ireland national team at schoolboy, youth, amateur, U21 and senior level. Whelan first represented his country at schoolboy level.

Whelan was a regular for the Republic of Ireland, making his debut on 29 April 1981 when he came off the bench in the 63rd minute of the 3–1 victory over Czechoslovakia at Lansdowne Road.

Whelan was part of the Irish side which qualified for the UEFA European Championship of 1988 in West Germany. He was in the team which memorably beat England 1–0, and in the next game scored a spectacular goal in a draw with the USSR. Defeat in the final group game, against eventual champions Netherlands, eliminated Ireland from the competition. In general, Ireland's style under manager Jack Charlton did not involve precision midfield play, which limited Whelan's international impact. He came on as a substitute against Holland in his only appearance in the 1990 World Cup, and played for less than a half against Norway in his sole 1994 World Cup game. In all he played 53 times for his country, scoring three goals.

== Managerial career ==
On his departure from Anfield in 1994 after 15 years, Whelan signed for Southend United and became their player-manager a year later, before being sacked at the end of the 1996–97 season following their relegation from Division One.

He later worked with clubs in Greece such as Panionios and in Cyprus such as Apollon Limassol and Olympiakos Nicosia. His greatest success as a manager, was with Panionios in 1999, when his team reached for first time the quarter finals of a European competition, the Cup Winners Cup, when they were eliminated by eventual champions S.S. Lazio by 0–4 and 0–3 scores over the two legs.

== Media career ==
Whelan now works on the after-dinner circuit and does some punditry.

Whelan features regularly on RTÉ Sport's soccer programming, including its Premier League and UEFA Champions League coverage. He is notable for his pronunciation of Germany midfielder Bastian Schweinsteiger's name. He contributed to RTÉ Sport's coverage of the 2010 FIFA World Cup. He was also part of RTÉ Sport's studio coverage of the 2014 FIFA World Cup. He was signed to be part of RTÉ Sport's coverage of UEFA Euro 2016, UEFA Euro 2020 and UEFA Euro 2024.

== Career statistics ==
=== Club ===
Appearances and goals by club, season and competition
Club	Season	League			FA Cup		League Cup		Europe		Other (Note: Includes Charity Shield, UEFA Super Cup, Intercontinental Cup, Super Cup ScreenSport and Mercantile Credit Centenary Trophy.)		Total	
Club	Season	Division	Apps	Goals	Apps	Goals	Apps	Goals	Apps	Goals	Apps	Goals	Apps	Goals
Home Farm	1977–78	League of Ireland												
Home Farm	1978–79	League of Ireland												
Liverpool	1979–80	First Division	0	0	0	0	0	0	0	0	—		0	0
Liverpool	1980–81	First Division	1	1	0	0	0	0	0	0	—		1	1
Liverpool	1981–82	First Division	32	10	3	0	8	3	4	1	—		47	14
Liverpool	1982–83	First Division	28	2	1	0	6	2	5	3	1	0	41	7
Liverpool	1983–84	First Division	23	4	1	0	5	3	5	2	—		34	9
Liverpool	1984–85	First Division	37	7	7	4	3	1	9	0	3	0	59	12
Liverpool	1985–86	First Division	39	10	7	1	7	3	—		4	0	57	14
Liverpool	1986–87	First Division	39	3	3	0	8	2	—		3	0	53	5
Liverpool	1987–88	First Division	28	1	2	0	3	0	—		—		33	1
Liverpool	1988–89	First Division	37	4	5	0	6	0	—		3	0	51	4
Liverpool	1989–90	First Division	34	1	8	1	3	0	—		1	0	46	2
Liverpool	1990–91	First Division	14	1	1	0	1	0	—		1	0	17	1
Liverpool	1991–92	First Division	10	0	3	1	0	0	0	0	—		13	1
Liverpool	1992–93	Premier League	17	1	0	0	0	0	0	0	1	0	18	1
Liverpool	1993–94	Premier League	23	1	0	0	0	0	—		—		23	1
Southend United	1994–95	First Division	33	1	1	0			—				33	1
Southend United	1995–96	First Division	1	0					—				1	0
Career total			396	47	42	7	50	14	23	6	17	0	528	74

=== International ===
Appearances and goals by national team and year
National team	Year	Apps	Goals
Republic of Ireland	1981	3	0
Republic of Ireland	1982	1	0
Republic of Ireland	1983	2	0
Republic of Ireland	1984	3	0
Republic of Ireland	1985	6	0
Republic of Ireland	1986	2	0
Republic of Ireland	1987	7	1
Republic of Ireland	1988	6	1
Republic of Ireland	1989	7	1
Republic of Ireland	1990	4	0
Republic of Ireland	1991	0	0
Republic of Ireland	1992	2	0
Republic of Ireland	1993	4	0
Republic of Ireland	1994	4	0
Republic of Ireland	1995	2	0
Total		53	3

== Honours ==
Liverpool

- Football League First Division: 1981–82, 1982–83, 1983–84, 1985–86, 1987–88, 1989–90
- FA Cup: 1985–86, 1988–89
- Football League Cup: 1981–82, 1982–83, 1983–84; runner-up: 1986–87
- FA Charity Shield: 1982, 1986 (shared), 1988, 1989, 1990
- Football League Super Cup: 1986
- European Cup: 1980–81, 1983–84
