= Steve Staunton =

Irish footballer (born 1969)

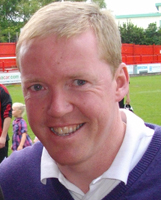
- Staunton in 2011

Personal information
- Full name: Stephen Staunton
- Date of birth: 19 January 1969 (age 57)
- Place of birth: Drogheda, Ireland
- Height: 6 ft 1 in (1.85 m)
- Position: Defender

Senior career*
Years	Team	Apps	(Gls)
1985–1986	Dundalk		
1986–1991	Liverpool	65	(0)
1987	→ Bradford City (loan)	8	(0)
1991–1998	Aston Villa	208	(16)
1998–2000	Liverpool	44	(0)
2000	→ Crystal Palace (loan)	6	(1)
2000–2003	Aston Villa	73	(0)
2003–2005	Coventry City	70	(4)
2005	Walsall	7	(0)
Total		481	(21)

International career
1987–1989	Republic of Ireland U21	4	(0)
1988–2002	Republic of Ireland	102	(8)

Managerial career
- 2006–2007: Republic of Ireland
- 2009–2010: Darlington
- * Club domestic league appearances and goals

Stephen Staunton (born 19 January 1969) is an Irish football manager, scout and former professional footballer.

He played as a defender with two separate spells each with Premier League sides Aston Villa and Liverpool. He also played in the Football League for Bradford City, Crystal Palace, Coventry City and Walsall. He earned 102 caps for the Republic of Ireland national football team, captained his team to the knock-out stage of the 2002 FIFA World Cup and earned his place in the FIFA Century Club.

After retiring, he served as Republic of Ireland national team coach prior to Giovanni Trapattoni. He also spent five months as manager of Darlington in Football League Two and has worked on the coaching staff at Leeds United and Sunderland.

== Career ==
=== Pre-Liverpool ===
Born in Drogheda, County Louth, Staunton was an accomplished all-round sportsman. He grew up in Dundalk, also in County Louth, and attended the De La Salle College in the town. As well as playing soccer for his home club of Dundalk, he played Gaelic football, appearing for Louth's U-16 team and winning a Louth Senior Championship medal with Clan na Gael. He also played for his local team St Dominic's at underage level.

=== Liverpool ===
Staunton was spotted by Liverpool playing in Ireland for his home club of Dundalk as a 17-year-old and was signed on 2 September 1986 by manager Kenny Dalglish for a fee of £20,000.

He spent the first two seasons in the reserves and even went on loan to Bradford City for eight games during the 1987–88 season as cover for the injured Karl Goddard. He made his Liverpool debut on 17 September 1988 in the 1–1 league draw with Tottenham Hotspur at Anfield. As a result of his impressive performance he remained in the side for the rest of the season, despite him being vastly inexperienced compared to the players around him who were defending a League championship title won the year before. Following on from his impressive debut he scored his first goal three days later on 20 September; however, his 80th-minute strike wasn't enough to prevent Arsenal winning the Centenary Trophy semi-final 2–1.

An injury to captain Alan Hansen meant that regular left back Gary Ablett had to be shifted across to the centre of defence. Staunton was therefore given his chance and proved an impressive and consistent performer in a team of strong players, playing his part as Liverpool challenged for the title again.

In the aftermath of the Hillsborough disaster, which ultimately claimed the lives of 97 fans at the FA Cup semi-final on 15 April 1989, Staunton was among the players who comforted bereaved families and attended many of the funerals. He also put in an outstanding performance when the fateful FA Cup semi-final was rescheduled a month later, with Liverpool beating Nottingham Forest 3–1.

Staunton played in the FA Cup Final at Wembley – he was substituted at the start of the extra-time period – as Liverpool defeated Merseyside rivals Everton 3–2. However, the season ended with disappointment when Liverpool lost the League title in a decider against Arsenal at Anfield. The Gunners needed to win by two clear goals and were 1–0 up with just seconds remaining. With virtually the last kick of the season Michael Thomas broke through the centre of the Reds defence to score, thus stopping Liverpool gaining a second league and FA Cup double – something which no English club had yet achieved.

The following year, Staunton was a frequent presence again as Liverpool reclaimed the League title. His first goals for Liverpool came in remarkable fashion on 4 October 1989 when he came on as a substitute in a League Cup tie against Wigan Athletic and scored a hat-trick. The following season he scored twice more; against Crewe Alexandra in the League Cup and Blackburn Rovers in the FA Cup. However 1990–91 was his final season with Liverpool before being astutely signed up by Aston Villa on 7 August 1991 for £1.1 million. New manager Graeme Souness was accused of misjudging the player's abilities, though the ruling for European ties possibly had a bearing, with Staunton being classed as a foreigner, of which no team was allowed to field more than four; the Bosman ruling (which included the abolishment of quotas for EU citizens on teams in member countries) was not passed until 1995.

=== Aston Villa ===
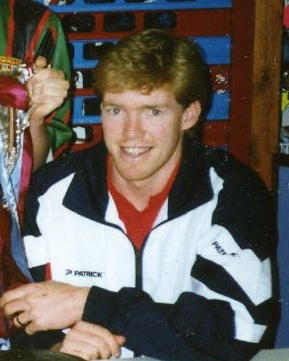
Staunton in 1995.

The 22-year-old Staunton made a good impression on the Villa fans by marking his debut on 17 August with a goal in the 3–2 win over Sheffield Wednesday at Hillsborough. He soon became a regular in Villa's defence, alongside the likes of the legendary Villan Paul McGrath, as they finished seventh during the 1991–92 season. The following year he played an important role in the club's push for the title in the first Premier League season. Villa, in the end, lost out to Manchester United and had to settle for second place.

The following season, he won a League Cup winners medal when he helped a wounded Villa gain revenge on Manchester United by beating them 3–1 (denying them a domestic treble). The League Cup medal completed his domestic medal set. In the 1994–95 season, despite the club's managerial problems, he had a fine season and regularly captained the side. The 1995–96 season was a mixed one for Staunton. He won another League Cup medal, this time as a non-playing substitute in the excellent 3–0 victory over Leeds United, but his playing time was limited due to a number of injuries.

Over the next two seasons he was once again a regular in defence, playing his part in Villa's run to the UEFA Cup quarter finals in 1996–97. He also scored from a corner during his time at Villa. Meanwhile, in the league, he helped a transitional Villa team to a fifth-place finish in 1996–97 and seventh in 1997–98.

=== Return to Anfield ===
With his contract set to expire at Villa, he gained a surprise move back to Liverpool on 3 July 1998 when joint managers Roy Evans and Gérard Houllier signed him on a free transfer. On 27 September 1999, during the Merseyside derby against Everton at Anfield, Staunton played the last 15 minutes of the game in goal after Sander Westerveld had been sent off for fighting with Francis Jeffers after Liverpool had used all three substitutes. He scored once in his second spell at Liverpool, his goal coming in a League Cup tie against Hull City in September 1999.

His second spell on Merseyside lasted two years before he was told he could leave on a free transfer. After a brief loan spell at Crystal Palace, where he made six league appearances and scored once against Tranmere Rovers, he was recalled to Anfield to appear in his 148th and last game for the Reds: it came on 23 November 2000 in the 2–2 draw with Greek side Olympiakos in the UEFA Cup.

=== Return to Villa Park ===
On 7 December 2000, the 31-year-old joined Aston Villa on another free transfer. He played in 14 of the club's remaining league fixtures and then featured regularly for a further two seasons. He scored once in his second spell at Villa, his goal coming in the Intertoto Cup against FC Zurich.

=== Coventry City ===
Staunton continued to play club football, plying his trade with Coventry City, moving there on 15 August 2003 on another free transfer. He made his début on 16 August 2003 in the 0–0 league draw with Walsall at Highfield Road. He remained with the Sky Blues until the summer of 2005, clocking up 75 appearances.

=== Walsall ===
Staunton decided not to renew his contract once it had expired, and instead joined Walsall on 2 August 2005. He played just 10 times for Walsall and also held the post of assistant coach until 16 January 2006, when he was appointed manager of the Republic of Ireland senior international side. He was captain of the Walsall side that defeated Blackpool 2–0 on New Year's Eve 2005, in what was his final game as a professional footballer at the end of a 20-year career.

== International career ==
Staunton made his debut for the Republic of Ireland in the 4–0 friendly win over Tunisia. He went to Italy with Jack Charlton's squad as the Republic of Ireland competed in their first ever FIFA World Cup finals. Staunton, the youngest member of the squad, played in every match at left back (though by now at club level he had also proved his usefulness as a central defender or midfield player) as the Republic of Ireland progressed to the quarter-finals, when they were beaten by the host nation.

He also represented the Republic of Ireland at FIFA World Cup 1994 in the United States. Again, he played in each game as the Republic of Ireland succumbed in the second round to the Netherlands.

The Republic of Ireland failed to qualify for both Euro 96 in England and the 1998 World Cup in France, though Staunton was still selected regularly for the team.

The Republic of Ireland qualified for the 2002 World Cup held in Japan and South Korea following a playoff against Iran. Staunton captained the Irish team in the second leg in Tehran. Coach Mick McCarthy, who had been Staunton's captain at the country's first World Cup 12 years earlier, selected him for the squad and named him captain following the departure of Roy Keane from the squad.

Again, Staunton played in every Republic of Ireland game of the tournament. With the 1–1 group match draw against Germany on 5 June, he became the first Irishman to make 100 appearances for his country. As of the end of Ireland's qualifying campaign for the 2010 FIFA World Cup he was still the joint record holder with former teammates Shay Given and Kevin Kilbane, though both players (along with Robbie Keane) have since emulated Staunton's appearance record.

Ireland's competition ended once more in the second round when they lost agonizingly to Spain in a penalty shoot-out after the game had finished 1–1. Staunton announced his retirement from international football immediately afterwards after setting a national record of 102 appearances. He is the only player to have played in every single one of Ireland's 13 World Cup finals games.

On two occasions he scored directly from corner-kicks. The first of which came in a 2–0 victory over Portugal on 7 June 1992, during a US Cup game in Boston and the second came in a 3–0 defeat of Northern Ireland on 31 March 1993 during a World Cup qualifier in Dublin.

== Managerial career ==
=== National team ===
Following the Republic of Ireland's failure to reach the 2006 FIFA World Cup, the tenure of manager Brian Kerr came to an end. A three-man Football Association of Ireland (FAI) subcommittee spearheaded by its former treasurer John Delaney was formed with the remit of appointing a capable successor to Kerr. Delaney assured the Irish public that a "world class" management team would be appointed to oversee Ireland's qualification campaign for the 2008 European Championship. After an initial flurry of rumours linking names of the calibre of Alex Ferguson, Terry Venables and Bobby Robson with the post, Staunton was released from his player/assistant manager role for Walsall on 12 January 2006 and was officially named as Kerr's replacement the following day, with former England manager Sir Bobby Robson supporting him in the role of International Consultant and with former Aston Villa teammate Kevin MacDonald as coach. Staunton was something of a shock appointment given the names that had been circulated and his own limited coaching and managerial experience.

"I know that the calibre of the team I have will bring a huge range of experience and talent to the challenges that lie ahead ... I'm the boss. I'm the gaffer. At the end of the day what I say goes, the buck stops with me ..."

— Staunton upon his appointment as Republic of Ireland manager.

His international management career enjoyed a dream start, something Staunton called "a bit of a fairytale", when he led Ireland to an impressive 3–0 victory over Sweden on 1 March 2006 with Damien Duff, Robbie Keane (captaining the Republic of Ireland for the first time) and Liam Miller getting onto the score sheet. The victory over Sweden was followed by two friendly defeats, the first a disappointing 1–0 loss against Chile on 23 May 2006 and then a 4–0 thrashing by Holland at Lansdowne Road, Ireland's worst home reverse in 40 years.

Prior to the Holland game, Staunton was confronted and threatened by a man outside the team hotel on Monday 14 August with a gun that turned out to be an imitation Uzi machine gun. The 31-year-old assailant was arrested at a nearby beach and released by police the following day. No physical harm was caused but the event was a public relations disaster for both Staunton and the FAI (this was not the first time an assailant had attacked members of the squad at that particular hotel). Shortly after this incident further embarrassment was caused by the revelation that the FAI had sent news of Ireland midfielder Andy Reid's recall to the national side to the player's former club Tottenham despite the fact that he was by then a Charlton player.

It was against this backdrop that Staunton oversaw his first competitive match in charge as Republic of Ireland manager; a 1–0 defeat against Germany in Stuttgart, Ireland losing despite a battling performance. Staunton himself was sent off by the referee for kicking a water bottle onto the pitch in frustration during the second half. Worse was swiftly to follow. On 7 October 2006, in their second UEFA Euro 2008 qualifier, Ireland suffered a demoralising 5–2 defeat by lowly Cyprus in Nicosia. Staunton was watching from the stands, having been given a touchline ban for his sending-off in Germany. The defeat by Cyprus heaped additional pressure on the already beleaguered Staunton, who even at this early stage of his leadership was already facing calls for his resignation, ahead of Ireland's next game which was at home to the Czech Republic on 11 October. The FAI, when pressed on the matter, refused to deny that a poor result would result in the manager's immediate dismissal. An improved performance against the Czechs resulted in a 1–1 draw, a result that eased the pressure on Staunton to some extent.

Staunton was seen to be emotional after the 5–0 victory over San Marino; it was to be the last match to be played on the old Lansdowne Road pitch. In the return fixture, a poor performance ensured the team needed a goal from Stephen Ireland four minutes into injury time to secure the three points with a final score of 2–1. Coming so close to dropping points against a team ranked 195th in the world at the time of the match immediately sparked further calls for the manager's resignation.

Ireland returned to form with two successive 1–0 home victories over Wales and Slovakia which brought them close to contention for second place in Group D of the UEFA Euro 2008 qualifying groups. Such was the surprise that greeted the results that RTÉ presenter Bill O'Herlihy concluded the coverage of the Slovakia game with the comment, "Ireland are now in contention for qualification for Euro 2008. Who would have thought it?" The upswing in form continued on 22 August 2007 with a 4–0 win in a non-competitive match against Denmark in Aarhus. Staunton was delighted with the results and headed into the next set of fixtures with Ireland placed third in the qualifying group.

The victories, however, proved to be something of a false dawn as, over the space of five days in September, an injury-hit Ireland dropped five points from two games and saw their qualifying campaign effectively come to an end. Leading 2–1 away to Slovakia the team would emerge with just one point after an injury-time strike from Marek Cech cancelled their advantage. Staunton was disappointed by the performance but four days later, on 12 September, a 1–0 defeat to the Czech Republic in Prague crippled the qualifying campaign. A 0–0 draw with Germany on 13 October at Croke Park and a 1–1 draw at home to Cyprus in the same stadium four days later (during which a chorus of boos greeted the final whistle) secured qualification for both Germany and the Czech Republic. Ireland would not be competing in the 2008 European Championship.

Amid the fans' dissatisfaction, many pundits commented that Staunton was now effectively on borrowed time and the FAI announced that an emergency meeting was to be called to discuss Staunton's position on 23 October. Prior to this, John Delaney gave an interview to RTÉ where he refused to publicly back the beleaguered manager and attempted to extricate himself from any responsibility for his role in Staunton's initial appointment. Staunton, for his part, refused to resign and publicly stated that he intended to see out the remainder of his four-year contract.

On the evening of 23 October 2007, after initially indicating to reporters that the FAI meeting would take place in Dublin's Crowne Plaza Hotel, where two executive rooms had been hired for use by the FAI, it emerged that Staunton had met the FAI in secret in the Radisson Hotel at Dublin airport where he made his case to be retained in the job. The FAI subsequently met in private discussion for six hours after which it was confirmed that Staunton's turbulent 21-month reign as international manager had come to an end. He was replaced by Don Givens who temporarily took charge of the national team until Giovanni Trapattoni's appointment as manager.

=== Leeds United ===
On 4 February 2008, Staunton joined up with recently appointed Leeds United manager Gary McAllister for a training session, with a view to becoming McAllister's assistant manager at the club. He was given the post later that day. In his first month at Leeds, the club did not win a game, until a 1–0 victory on 1 March against Swindon Town. When McAllister was sacked by Leeds United in December 2008 after five consecutive defeats, Staunton also left the club.

=== Darlington ===
Staunton was appointed as a scout at Wolverhampton Wanderers under manager Mick McCarthy. In May 2009, it was reported that he had applied for the then vacant manager's seat at Port Vale. On 5 October 2009, he was announced as Darlington manager, to take over officially two days later following a Football League Trophy game against his previous club Leeds United. His contract was initially to take him to the end of the season, with Kevin Richardson appointed as his assistant manager. Staunton lost his first game in charge, 2–0 to Dagenham & Redbridge. On 21 March 2010, with Darlington bottom of the league and facing relegation to the Football Conference, Staunton was sacked as the Darlington manager. He had won just four games from his 23 league matches in charge, although his sacking was also put down to a record low crowd for a league game at the Darlington Arena of 1,463 against Barnet in Staunton's final match in charge.

=== Sunderland ===
Staunton was then handed a job as a scout at Sunderland on 22 August 2011. However, he was relieved of his role in 2013.

Post-football

Moving on from football in 2013, Staunton focused on his international property portfolio. He filed for bankruptcy in 2017 after a couple of unsuccessful investments.

== Career statistics ==
=== Club ===
Appearances and goals by club, season and competition
Club	Season	League			FA Cup		League Cup		Continental		Other (Note: Includes FA Charity Shield, Full Members Cup and Centenary Trophy)		Total	
Club	Season	Division	Apps	Goals	Apps	Goals	Apps	Goals	Apps	Goals	Apps	Goals	Apps	Goals
Bradford City (loan)	1987–88	Second Division	8	0	0	0	2	0	–		1	0	11	0
Liverpool	1987–88	First Division	0	0	0	0	0	0	–		–		0	0
Liverpool	1988–89	First Division	21	0	3	0	4	0	–		1	0	29	0
Liverpool	1989–90	First Division	20	0	6	0	2	3	–		–		28	3
Liverpool	1990–91	First Division	24	0	7	1	2	1	–		–		33	2
Liverpool	Total		65	0	16	1	8	4	–		1	0	90	5
Aston Villa	1991–92	First Division	37	4					–		–		37	4
Aston Villa	1992–93	Premier League	42	2					–		–		42	2
Aston Villa	1993–94	Premier League	24	3					–		–		24	3
Aston Villa	1994–95	Premier League	35	5					–		–		35	5
Aston Villa	1995–96	Premier League	13	0					–		–		13	0
Aston Villa	1996–97	Premier League	30	1					–		–		30	1
Aston Villa	1997–98	Premier League	27	1	4	1	0	0	8 (Note: Appearances in UEFA Cup)	0	–		39	2
Aston Villa	Total		208	16	4	1	0	0	8	0	–		220	17
Liverpool	1998–99	Premier League	31	0	1	0	2	0	6	0	–		40	0
Liverpool	1999–2000	Premier League	12	0	1	0	3	1	–		–		16	1
Liverpool	2000–01	Premier League	1	0	–		0	0	1	0	–		2	0
Liverpool	Total		44	0	2	0	5	1	7	0	–		58	1
Crystal Palace (loan)	2000–01	First Division	6	1			–		–		–		6	1
Aston Villa	2000–01	Premier League	14	0	3	0	–		–		–		17	0
Aston Villa	2001–02	Premier League	33	0	1	0	2	0	2	0	–		38	0
Aston Villa	2002–03	Premier League	26	0	0	0	3	0	3	1	–		32	1
Aston Villa	Total		73	0	4	0	5	0	5	1	–		87	1
Coventry City	2003–04	First Division	35	3	2	0	1	0	–		–		38	3
Coventry City	2004–05	Championship	35	1	1	0	1	0	–		–		37	1
Coventry City	Total		70	4	3	0	2	0	–		–		75	4
Walsall	2005–06	League One	7	0	2	0	0	0	–		1	0	10	0
Career total			481	21	31	2	22	5	20	1	3	0	557	29

=== International ===
Appearances and goals by national team and year
National team	Year	Apps	Goals
Republic of Ireland	1988	2	0
Republic of Ireland	1989	6	0
Republic of Ireland	1990	13	1
Republic of Ireland	1991	7	0
Republic of Ireland	1992	8	1
Republic of Ireland	1993	7	3
Republic of Ireland	1994	11	0
Republic of Ireland	1995	7	1
Republic of Ireland	1996	3	0
Republic of Ireland	1997	9	0
Republic of Ireland	1998	4	0
Republic of Ireland	1999	5	1
Republic of Ireland	2000	4	1
Republic of Ireland	2001	8	0
Republic of Ireland	2002	8	0
Total		102	8

=== Managerial ===
Team	From	To	Record				
Team	From	To	G	W	D	L	Win %
Republic of Ireland	January 2006	October 2007	17	6	6	5	35.29
Darlington	October 2009	March 2010	25	4	2	19	16.00
Total			42	10	8	24	23.81

== Honours ==
Liverpool

- Football League First Division: 1989–90
- FA Cup: 1988–89
- FA Charity Shield: 1988, 1990 (shared)

Aston Villa

- Football League Cup: 1993–94, 1995–96

Individual

- FAI Senior International Player of the Year: 1993
- FAI Young International Player of the Year: 1989

== See also ==
- List of men's footballers with 100 or more international caps

Sporting positions
Preceded by Roy Keane	Republic of Ireland national team Captain; 2002	Succeeded by Kenny Cunningham
Preceded by Paul Merson	Aston Villa F.C. Captain; 2002–2003	Succeeded by Olof Melberg
