= Mick Smith (footballer) =

English footballer

Personal information
- Full name: Michael Smith
- Date of birth: 28 October 1958 (age 68)
- Place of birth: Sunderland, England
- Height: 6 ft 1 in (1.85 m)
- Position: Centre half

Youth career
- Lambton Street B.C.

Senior career*
Years	Team	Apps	(Gls)
1977–1979	Lincoln City	25	(0)
1979–1988	Wimbledon	205	(14)
1984–1985	→ Aldershot (loan)	7	(0)
1988–1989	Bath City	21	(2)
1989	Seaham Red Star		
1989–1992	Hartlepool United	55	(6)
- * Club domestic league appearances and goals

Michael Smith (born 28 October 1958) is an English former footballer who made nearly 300 appearances in the Football League playing for Lincoln City, Wimbledon, Aldershot and Hartlepool United. He played as a centre half. Between leaving Wimbledon and joining Hartlepool, he spent time with Southern League club Bath City and Seaham Red Star of the Northern League.

== Life and career ==
Smith was born in 1958 in Sunderland, where he played football for Lambton Street Boys' Club. In 1977, he was one of four youngsters from that club – the others were Alan Eden, Mick Harford and Keith Laybourne – who signed for Football League Third Division club Lincoln City. Smith made 27 appearances over two seasons, At the end of the 1979–80 season, he joined Wimbledon, newly promoted to the Third Division having joined the Football League only two years before.

He was a mainstay of the Wimbledon team for several seasons as they were twice relegated to the Fourth Division before working their way up the league to gain promotion to the First Division in 1986. According to Dave Bassett and Wally Downes in the book The Crazy Gang, Smith "simply enjoyed being a typical son-of-the-soil centre-half who went in, got the ball and cleared it." He played little in the top flight because of injury, and retired from football in 1988.

After making a partial recovery, Smith signed for Bath City of the Southern League during the 1988–89 season, and became their player of the year. He and the club failed to agree terms for the next season, so he returned to the north-east of England. After a short period with Seaham Red Star of the Northern League, he joined Hartlepool United, and made a major contribution to the club's successful fight against relegation from the Football League. The following year, he was part of the Hartlepool team that won promotion to the Third Division for the first time since 1968.

Smith was youth team manager of Hartlepool for two years, from 1998 to 2000.

== Honours ==
Wimbledon

- Football League Fourth Division: 1982–83
- Football League Group Cup runner-up: 1981–82
