= Barry Venison =

English footballer (born 1964)

- Venison outside Loftus Road in April 2001

Personal information
- Full name: Barry Venison
- Date of birth: 16 August 1964 (age 62)
- Place of birth: Consett, County Durham, England
- Height: 5 ft 10 in (1.78 m)
- Position: Defender

Senior career*
Years	Team	Apps	(Gls)
1981–1986	Sunderland	173	(2)
1986–1992	Liverpool	110	(1)
1992–1995	Newcastle United	109	(1)
1995	Galatasaray	8	(0)
1995–1997	Southampton	24	(0)
Total		424	(4)

International career
1982–1983	England Youth	9	(4)
1982–1986	England U21	10	(0)
1994–1995	England	2	(0)

Managerial career
- 2016: Orange County Blues
- * Club domestic league appearances and goals

Barry Venison (born 16 August 1964) is an English football coach, former professional footballer and sports television pundit.

As a player was a defender from 1981 to 1997. He played for Sunderland, Liverpool, Newcastle United, Galatasaray and Southampton. He was capped twice by England.

Following retirement, he became a television pundit and most notably worked on ITV Sport's The Premiership between 2001 and 2004 whilst the network held the rights to show Premier League highlights. In 2016, he was given his first head coaching role at Orange County Blues, succeeding Oliver Wyss.

== Club career ==
=== Sunderland ===
Venison was born in Consett, County Durham. He played for England at youth and under-21 level in his early days. He started his club career in his native North East with Sunderland and set a record when he became the youngest captain at a Wembley cup final when, aged 20 years and 220 days, he skippered Sunderland against Norwich City in the 1985 League Cup final in place of the suspended Shaun Elliott. Unfortunately for both Venison and Sunderland they lost 1–0.

Venison had originally made his debut for the Black Cats, aged just 17, on 10 October 1981 in the 2–0 league defeat to Notts County at Meadow Lane. He went on to play in 20 league games that season scoring one goal in the process. The steady and reliable right full-back settled into first team football well at Roker Park and became a firm favourite in 1983–84, when he missed just one league game.

At the end of the 1984–85 season, the same season in which they had reached the League Cup final, Sunderland were relegated to the Second Division. After Sunderland's failure to win promotion in 1985–86, Venison asked for a transfer as his Sunderland contract neared expiry in 1986, so he wrote to Liverpool as that was the only team he wanted to play for.

By the end of the 1985–86 season he had made a total of 205 appearances for the Wearsiders; 173 of them in the Football League. He had scored two goals.

=== Liverpool ===
It was Liverpool manager Kenny Dalglish who acted quickest and duly offered him a deal. The recent Double winners paid Sunderland £200,000 for Venison's services on 31 July 1986, with a view to him becoming a long term successor to the ageing right-back Mark Lawrenson.

Venison made his Liverpool debut on 16 August 1986 in the traditional curtain raiser at Wembley, the Charity Shield, Liverpool faced derby rivals Everton, who had lost out to the Reds in both the previous season's League and FA Cup campaigns. The usual high tempo game ended in a 1–1 draw with both clubs sharing the shield. He featured in 33 out of 42 league games that season.

Venison was a League Cup final loser again in his first season at Anfield, when Liverpool were defeated by Arsenal in the 1987 final. He was also denied the chance of league title glory as the Reds were beaten into second place in the league by their neighbours Everton.

He played 18 times for Liverpool when they secured League championship in 1988, losing just two out of 40 league games. However, the emergence of fellow young defender Gary Ablett meant that Venison lost his place in the team. He was also hampered by injury and was unavailable for that season's FA Cup final, which Liverpool unexpectedly lost to Wimbledon.

The next season would see Venison's first goal for the club, it came on 29 August 1988 in the 4–1 thrashing of Nottingham Forest in the quarter finals of the Centenary trophy. Venison featured in more games but with fewer starts, often named as one of the two permitted substitutes.

Venison, along with his teammates, supported the bereaved families of the Hillsborough disaster in April 1989, attending a number of the funerals, he then played his role as Liverpool reached the final of the FA Cup again. Dalglish brought him on as an extra-time substitute as Liverpool defeated Merseyside rivals Everton 3–2. Liverpool later lost the League title in a decider against Arsenal at Anfield after Michael Thomas scored the winner with virtually the last kick of the whole season. Venison was on the bench again.

1990 saw Venison play 25 times in the league and earn another championship medal as Liverpool secured their 18th top division title.

During the following campaign Venison only managed a total of 14 appearances in all competitions, however, this did include another Wembley appearance as Liverpool faced bitter rivals Manchester United in the Charity Shield. Liverpool had to share the trophy as they drew 1–1 with their North West rivals.

Venison scored what would be his only league goal for the Reds on 31 March 1992, netting the side's final goal in a 4–0 win over Notts County. He played 13 times in the league that season, as Liverpool finished sixth – the first time since 1981 that they had not been league champions or runners-up. They did win the FA Cup by defeating Venison's old club Sunderland 2–0 at Wembley. However, he was not included in the squad, and with Liverpool now managed by Graeme Souness, who had succeeded Dalglish a year earlier, it appeared that Venison's future now lay away from Anfield, particularly after the form of new signing Rob Jones at right-back.

=== Newcastle United ===
On 31 July 1992, exactly six years after joining Liverpool, he departed from Merseyside and returned to the North East to play for Sunderland's rivals Newcastle United, who were preparing for a promotion push in the new Division One (as the old Second Division was now named following the creation of the FA Premier League) under the management of former Liverpool, Newcastle United and England striker Kevin Keegan.

Venison made his debut of the Magpies on 15 August 1992 in the 3–2 league win over Southend United at St James' Park, Venison enjoyed a tremendous beginning to his Newcastle career as they won their first eleven league games in a row, leaving them runaway leaders of Division One and looking uncatchable in the promotion race by October. The run came to an end when they lost to a last minute goal at home against Grimsby Town; they fell just 2 games short of the record 13 straight victories that had been set seven years earlier by Reading in the old Third Division. Keegan's team played in an exuberant, attacking style and their defence included a revitalised Venison as well as the likes of John Beresford and Steve Howey. Newcastle went on to become Division One champions, thus gaining promotion to the Premier League.

Venison only scored one goal for the Magpies but he regards it as being the best goal he's ever scored; it was, in his words, "a 20-yard screamer" against Aston Villa at a packed St James' Park.

Venison remained a crucial part of the Newcastle defence as they returned to the top flight in 1993–94, and helped them hit the ground running as they secured a third-place finish (though they never really looked like catching up with the leading pair that consisted of champions Manchester United and runners-up Blackburn Rovers). This gave the Magpies a place in Europe (the UEFA Cup) for the first time since the 1970s.

Keegan also successfully converted Venison into a midfield player following the arrival of right-back Marc Hottiger at the start of the 1994–95 season, though Venison lost the club captaincy when he was spotted in a wine bar outside of the club's curfew.

He played 28 times for the Magpies in the 1994–95 season, scoring his only league goal for them, and for a while it looked as though he might be gaining another championship medal to add to the two he earned at Liverpool. The Magpies achieved the best start to a top division campaign in their history as they won their first six games in the Premier League and entered October still top of the league. However, the excellent form was not maintained as the season went on, and a sixth-place finish wasn't enough for another UEFA Cup campaign.

=== Galatasaray ===
At the end of the 1994–95 season, after 130 appearances for Newcastle, Venison signed for Galatasaray in Turkey on 31 May 1995 for £750,000. He was one of several British footballers recruited by coach Graeme Souness, who had been his manager during his final year at Liverpool earlier in the decade.

=== Southampton ===
Venison spent just under 5 months with the Turkish side, playing eight games, before he was on the move once more. He joined Southampton for £850,000 on 25 October 1995. He played 22 Premier League games that season as Southampton avoided relegation on goal difference and reached the FA Cup quarter finals.

He played two more games for the Saints in the 1996–97 season (by which time Souness was manager of Southampton, the third club Venison had played under him at), before he suffered a back injury which led to him announcing his retirement from playing on 20 October 1996 at the age of 32.

== International career ==
Venison had been selected to represent England at under-21 level on 10 occasions from 1982 until 1986.

In 1994, aged 30, Venison was picked to represent his country by new coach Terry Venables. The call-up came as a surprise, not least to Venison, but he played well in both of his full international appearances. His debut came on 7 September 1994 in the 2–0 friendly victory over the United States; his only other appearance for his country came on 29 March 1995 in a 0–0 friendly draw with Uruguay. Both games were played at Wembley.

== Retirement and coaching roles ==
After retirement, Venison took up punditry; firstly for Sky Sports, and then, from 1997 to 2002, for ITV.

In the early 2000s, Venison launched an on-line sports memorabilia auction site. The company "bid4sport.com" was a not-for-profit company and raised money for charities. Julie Venison was also involved in Bid4sport providing business support and book-keeping for the venture. The company was initially based on the outskirts of Romsey before expanding and moving to premises to the west of Fareham. The venture was created with the help of friend and co-professional Brad Friedel. Venison sold Bid4sport shortly before his family relocated to the United States.

Venison also made an appearance as himself in the 2001 comedy film, Mike Bassett: England Manager.

Venison moved to the United States in 2003, firstly to Laguna Beach, and then Los Angeles. He worked in property development for a short time, before his friend Oliver Wyss, convinced him to return to football. Venison became Technical Director of Orange County Blues, before succeeding Wyss as head coach to see out the 2016 USL Pro season.

== Honours ==
Sunderland

- Football League Cup runner-up: 1984–85

Liverpool

- Football League First Division: 1987–88, 1989–90
- FA Cup: 1988–89
- FA Charity Shield: 1986 (shared), 1988, 1989, 1990 (shared)
- Football League Cup runner-up: 1986–87

Newcastle United

- Football League First Division: 1992–93

Individual

- Newcastle United Player of the Year: 1994–95
