= Gary Ablett (English footballer) =

English footballer and manager (1965–2012)

Personal information
- Full name: Gary Ian Ablett
- Date of birth: 19 November 1965
- Place of birth: Liverpool, England
- Date of death: 1 January 2012 (aged 46)
- Place of death: Tarleton, Lancashire, England
- Height: 6 ft 0 in (1.83 m)
- Position: Defender

Youth career
- 1982–1985: Liverpool

Senior career*
Years	Team	Apps	(Gls)
1985–1992	Liverpool	109	(1)
1985	→ Derby County (loan)	6	(0)
1986	→ Hull City (loan)	5	(0)
1992–1996	Everton	128	(5)
1996	→ Sheffield United (loan)	12	(0)
1996–1999	Birmingham City	104	(1)
1999	→ Wycombe Wanderers (loan)	4	(0)
2000	Blackpool	10	(1)
2000–2001	Long Island Rough Riders	21	(2)
Total		399	(10)

International career
1988	England U21	1	(0)
1990	England B	1	(0)

Managerial career
- 2002–2006: Everton U17
- 2006–2009: Liverpool U21
- 2009–2010: Stockport County
- * Club domestic league appearances and goals

Gary Ian Ablett (19 November 1965 – 1 January 2012) was an English professional footballer and manager. He played as a defender from 1985 until 2001.

Ablett spent nine years with Liverpool, winning several honours, before moving to their city rivals Everton in 1992. He went on to win the FA Cup with Everton, having previously won an FA Cup in 1989 with Liverpool against Everton. He also played for Derby County, Hull City, Sheffield United, Birmingham City, Wycombe Wanderers, Blackpool and ended his playing career in the United States with the Long Island Rough Riders.

He moved into coaching and managed Liverpool F.C. Reserves, and then spent a year as manager of Stockport County.

Ablett died on 1 January 2012, following 16-month's illness with non-Hodgkin lymphoma, at his home in Tarleton, Lancashire. He was 46 years old.

== Playing career ==
=== Liverpool ===
Ablett joined hometown club Liverpool as an apprentice upon leaving St Margaret's Church of England High School in 1982. He made his Liverpool debut on 20 December 1986 in a goalless league away draw with Charlton Athletic, when regular defenders Barry Venison and Mark Lawrenson were absent due to injury. He made five more appearances that season mainly at left-back, scoring what would be his only goal for the club on 18 April 1987 in a 3–0 home league victory over Nottingham Forest. Alongside experienced players in defence, such as Gary Gillespie, Steve Nicol and skipper Alan Hansen, Ablett helped Liverpool win the 1987–88 League championship and reach the 1988 FA Cup final. Ablett only collected a runners-up medal in the latter competition due to Liverpool's shock 1–0 defeat by Wimbledon.

In 1988–89, Liverpool made it to their second consecutive FA Cup final. This time they were successful, after a 3–2 victory over Merseyside rivals Everton. They lost the League title, however, to Arsenal with practically the last kick of the season. Ablett played most of the season at center-back due to injury problems for Alan Hansen, missing just three league games that season.

Ablett flitted in and out of the squad over the next year, relegated in the pecking order following the arrival of Glenn Hysén and the progress of Steve Staunton and David Burrows. He was used more frequently as a central defender rather than left full-back after Hansen continued suffering with injuries. At the end of the year Liverpool won the League again giving him his second league winners medal.

=== Everton ===
Kenny Dalglish resigned as Liverpool manager on 22 February 1991, and his successor, Graeme Souness, decided to sell Ablett for £750,000 to Everton in January 1992, after 147 appearances for the Reds.

He made his league debut for the club on 19 January 1992 in a 1–1 draw with Nottingham Forest at Goodison Park.

Ablett won the FA Cup with Everton in 1995, becoming the only player to win the competition with both Merseyside teams. However, he lost his place at left-back to Andy Hinchcliffe in the 1995–96 season, who had been moved back into defence after spending most of the previous season playing left midfield with Ablett behind him.

=== Later career ===
Ablett went on to make 128 league appearances and score five goals for Everton, and later went on to have a brief loan spell with Sheffield United before making a permanent move to Birmingham City for £390,000, joining them at the same time as established Premiership players Steve Bruce and Mike Newell, as new manager Trevor Francis set about building a side capable of challenging for a place in the Premier League.

In three years with the Blues, he scored twice, with goals against Swindon Town in the league and Leeds United in the FA Cup.

He was released by Francis in 1999, and after short spells with Wycombe Wanderers and Blackpool, where he played under former Anfield teammate Steve McMahon and scored once, against Luton Town, he signed for American A-League side Long Island Rough Riders in June 2000. In February 2002, at the age of 36, Ablett was taken on trial by Grimsby Town.

In 2006, Ablett appeared as a substitute in Replay 86, a charity match staged in aid of The Marina Dalglish Appeal, which pitted the Liverpool and Everton sides that had contested the 1986 FA Cup Final against each other one more. Ablett's inclusion was curious, because although on Liverpool's books at the time of the Final, he did not actually make his debut for the club until the December of that year. Regardless, his contribution ensured Liverpool won the game 1–0.

== Coaching and managerial career ==
In the summer of 2002, Ablett moved into coaching, taking up a post as the coach of Everton's under-17 side. He worked as part of the club's youth academy for several years until the summer of 2006, when he returned to his first club, taking the vacant job of Liverpool F.C. Reserves team coach, replacing Paco Herrera. The same career opportunities were not available at Everton with Andy Holden firmly established as reserve-team manager.

In April 2008, under Ablett's guidance, Liverpool's reserves were crowned champions of the Premier Reserve League North, and the following month they became national champions after a play-off final victory against Aston Villa's reserves. In July 2008, he completed his final UEFA coaching qualification by obtaining the UEFA Pro Licence.

On 28 May 2009, Liverpool announced that Ablett would be leaving his position as reserve team manager. On 8 July 2009, Ablett was announced as the new Stockport County manager. The club was in administration for the whole of the 2009–10 season, during which his team managed only five league wins. At the end of the season the team were relegated, 25 points adrift of safety. He left the club on 17 June 2010 when the 2015 Consortium took ownership of the club.

== Illness and death ==
Ablett agreed a one-year contract with Ipswich Town in July 2010 to join their coaching staff. After being taken ill on the training ground, he was diagnosed as suffering from non-Hodgkin lymphoma, a form of blood cancer.

On 1 January 2012, 17 months after his diagnosis, Ablett died at the age of 46. His funeral was held at Liverpool Anglican Cathedral on 17 January 2012 and was attended by former teammates, as well as members of the teams and the then managers of Everton and Liverpool.

Ablett's widow Jacqueline supported calls for investigation into the hypothesis that artificial turf causes cancer.

== Popular culture ==
In the city of Liverpool, United Kingdom, ecstasy pills are commonly referred to as "Garys" or "Garies" with Gary Ablett acting as rhyming slang for ecstasy tablet.

== Honours ==
Liverpool

- Football League First Division: 1987–88, 1989–90
- FA Cup: 1988–89; runner-up: 1987–88
- FA Charity Shield: 1988, 1989, 1990 (shared)

Everton

- FA Cup: 1994–95
- FA Charity Shield: 1995
