= Nick Tanner =

English footballer and manager

Personal information
- Full name: Nicholas Tanner
- Date of birth: 24 May 1965 (age 61)
- Place of birth: Kingswood, Bristol, England
- Height: 6 ft 2 in (1.88 m)
- Position: Defender

Youth career
- Bromley Heath
- Frampton Rangers

Senior career*
Years	Team	Apps	(Gls)
1982–1985	Mangotsfield United		
1985–1988	Bristol Rovers	107	(3)
1988–1994	Liverpool	59	(1)
1990	→ Norwich City (loan)	6	(0)
1990	→ Swindon Town (loan)	7	(0)
- Bath City

Managerial career
- 1997–2000: Mangotsfield United
- 2002–2003: Welton Rovers
- 2003–2005: Almondsbury Town
- 2005–2006: Roman Glass St George
- 2006–2007: Wotton Rovers
- 2009–2011: Winterbourne United
- * Club domestic league appearances and goals

Nicholas Tanner (born 24 May 1965) is an English former footballer who played professionally for Bristol Rovers and Liverpool.

He played non-league football for Bromley Heath, Frampton Rangers and Mangotsfield United before moving to Bristol Rovers. He scored on his debut for Rovers against Bristol City in the Gloucester Cup whilst on non-contract forms. He also represented the Gloucester County FA at youth and senior level.

He started his professional career as a central midfield player at Bristol Rovers under manager Bobby Gould before being signed by Liverpool in 1988, and was then converted to a central defender. He also had loan spells at Norwich City and Swindon Town before becoming a regular at Liverpool under Graeme Souness. He played 59 competitive games for the club, scoring one goal against rivals Everton on 28 December 1991 in a 1–1 draw, before retiring due to a back injury in 1994.

After retiring as a player, Tanner became manager of Hellenic League Side Almondsbury Town in November 2003, leaving them two years later to manage his former club Mangotsfield United in the Western League. He also managed the Gloucester County FA side and other local clubs including Roman Glass St George, Wotton Rovers (twice) and Almondsbury Town for a second spell before finishing his managerial career at Winterbourne United. He has also worked as chief scout at Forest Green Rovers and as a scout for various clubs via the scouting network group.

Since retiring he has worked in the insurance industry in Wilmslow. He now runs a Liverpool Legends event company and also works as a football analyst for BBC Radio Merseyside for Liverpool games.
