= Alex Watson (footballer) =

English footballer (born 1968)

Personal information
- Full name: Alexander Francis Watson
- Date of birth: 5 April 1968 (age 58)
- Place of birth: Liverpool, England
- Height: 6 ft 0 in (1.83 m)
- Position: Central defender

Youth career
- Liverpool

Senior career*
| Years | Team | Apps | (Gls) |
| 1985–1991 | Liverpool | 4 | (0) |
| 1990 | → Derby County (loan) | 5 | (0) |
| 1991–1995 | AFC Bournemouth | 151 | (5) |
| 1995 | → Gillingham (loan) | 10 | (1) |
| 1995–2001 | Torquay United | 202 | (8) |
| 2001–2003 | Exeter City | 46 | (1) |
| 2003–2004 | Taunton Town | | |
| 2004–2005 | Clevedon Town | 23 | (0) |

International career
| 1985 | England U17 | 3 | (0) |
| 1985 | England Youth | 1 | (0) |
- * Club domestic league appearances and goals

Alexander Francis Watson (born 5 April 1968) is an English former professional footballer who made more than 400 appearances in the Football League playing for Liverpool, Derby County, AFC Bournemouth, Gillingham, Torquay United and Exeter City. He is the younger brother of the former Everton player Dave Watson, and like his brother, played as a central defender.

== Life and career ==
Watson was born in Liverpool, and began his career as an apprentice with Liverpool F.C. He turned professional in 1985, and made his debut against Queens Park Rangers in March 1988. He made nine appearances in total for the club, of which four were in the league, and he was in the starting line-up for the 1988 Charity Shield.

In August 1990 he joined Derby County for a brief loan spell, and the following January he made a permanent move to AFC Bournemouth for a fee of £150,000. He spent almost five years there, making 182 appearances and scoring 6 league goals, moving to Gillingham on loan in September 1995 before joining Torquay United in November 1995 for a fee of £50,000.

He quickly became a crowd favourite at Torquay, becoming club captain in 1997 and assistant manager in 1999 under Wes Saunders. In July 2001 he made the short journey to join Exeter City on a free transfer. In his first season there he was a first-team regular, but a change of management saw him play only three games in the 2002–03 season. He was released in the summer of 2003 and signed for non-league club Taunton Town. He played 20 games without scoring in the first part of the 2004–05 season, before joining Clevedon Town in November 2004, playing 23 times without scoring in the remainder of the season.

He was an England youth international and is a FA qualified coach.
