= Jan Mølby =

Danish manager and former footballer (born 1963)

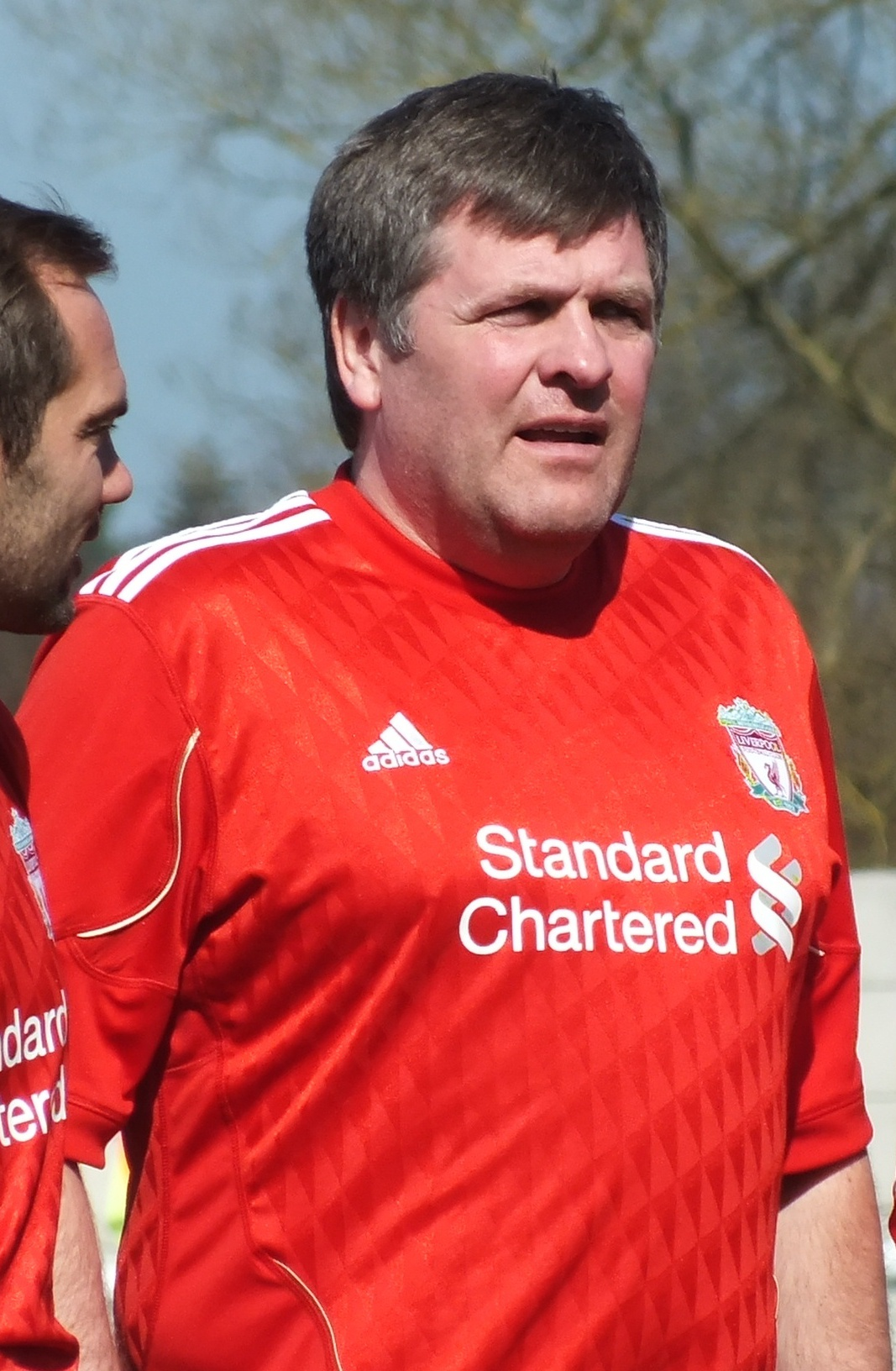
- Mølby in 2012

Personal information
- Full name: Jan Mølby
- Date of birth: 4 July 1963 (age 63)
- Place of birth: Kolding, Denmark
- Position: Midfielder

Senior career*
Years	Team	Apps	(Gls)
1981–1982	Kolding	40	(0)
1982–1984	Ajax	57	(11)
1984–1996	Liverpool	218	(44)
1995	→ Barnsley (loan)	5	(0)
1995	→ Norwich City (loan)	3	(0)
1996–1998	Swansea City	41	(8)
Total		364	(63)

International career
1979	Denmark U-17	6	(2)
1980–1981	Denmark U-19	9	(0)
1981–1983	Denmark U-21	7	(0)
1982–1990	Denmark	33	(2)

Managerial career
- 1996–1997: Swansea City
- 1999–2002: Kidderminster Harriers
- 2002: Hull City
- 2003–2004: Kidderminster Harriers
- * Club domestic league appearances and goals

Jan Mølby (Danish pronunciation: [ˈmølpy]; born 4 July 1963) is a Danish former professional footballer and manager. As a player, he was a midfielder from 1982 to 1998. After starting his career with Kolding, he moved on to Ajax before spending twelve years playing in England with Liverpool. He was capped 33 times by Denmark, scoring twice.

After leaving Liverpool he became player-manager of Swansea City, where he spent two years, and then managed Kidderminster Harriers, guiding them to promotion to the Football League in 2000. He later had a brief spell as manager of Hull City and then a brief spell back in charge of Kidderminster Harriers.

== Club career ==
Born in Kolding, Mølby started his senior playing career at Kolding, before joining Ajax and then Liverpool. He made his Reds debut on 25 August 1984, in a 3–3 First Division draw with Norwich City at Carrow Road, scoring his first goal for the club on 1 December of that year, in a 3–1 league defeat to Chelsea at Stamford Bridge.

Mølby began to establish himself as a regular and successful penalty taker, starting with two penalties converted at home to Tottenham Hotspur in the league on 28 September 1985. Other fine performances included a brace in open play in a 3–0 home win over Aston Villa in the league on 7 December, and two goals (one a penalty) as they eliminated Manchester United from the Football League Cup in a 2–1 win at Anfield in late November.

Ahead of the 1987–88 season, Mølby broke his leg in pre-season training. He was then arrested for drink driving in February 1988.

In 1988–89, Mølby returned to regular first team football, playing in central defence in the absence of the injured Alan Hansen, and scoring the winning goal against Manchester United at Anfield in the second league game of the season. However, in October 1988 Mølby was sentenced to three months' imprisonment for reckless driving following an incident earlier in the year. On his release, he struggled with further injuries and his general fitness.

Over the first three Premier League seasons (Mølby's last), he started just over 30 games in total and all his goals came from penalties, including one in Liverpool's first game of the 1994–95 season when Mølby opened the scoring with a penalty in a 6–1 away win against Crystal Palace at Selhurst Park.

Early in the 1995–96 season, manager Roy Evans loaned Mølby out to Barnsley and Norwich (where he scored once in the League Cup against Birmingham City). In February 1996, Mølby left Liverpool to take over as player-manager of Swansea City. Just before taking the job at the Vetch Field, Ron Atkinson unsuccessfully tried to sign him for Coventry City.

While at Liverpool, he scored a total of 62 goals, 42 of which were from penalties. During Mølby's time with Liverpool, he only failed to score three times from the penalty spot (penalties against Sheffield Wednesday and QPR in 1985–86 and Chelsea in 1989–90 were saved). His record as a penalty-taker in the top flight is thought to be second only to Matthew Le Tissier. Mølby held the club record of most penalties scored by a Liverpool player until Steven Gerrard surpassed his record in August 2014.

== Managerial career ==
Mølby became manager of Swansea City in February 1996 but was dismissed in October 1997 along with his assistant, Billy Ayre. Mølby had taken Swansea to the Division Three playoff final five months earlier, but they lost to a last-minute goal by Northampton Town's John Frain. A dismal start to the 1997–98 season had seen Swansea struggling near the foot of the Football League, and the board decided that it was time for a new manager to be appointed, asserting that the team's good performances the previous season were more down to Mølby's qualities as a top class player, rather than as a manager.

Following Kenny Jackett's resignation as Swansea manager in early 2007, Mølby was linked with a return to the club. However, Mølby responded by saying that he is unlikely to ever return to football management.

== Recent years ==
In April 2009, Mølby was made an 'Honorary Scouser' by the Lord Mayor of Liverpool.

Mølby appears on a podcast called "Mølby on the Spot" presented by Trevor Downey.

A running gag of comedian Troy Hawke (Milo McCabe) as he performs as a street greeter is that he was sent by Mølby, the "non-consensual CEO of the Greeter's Guild." The two men met at the public unveiling of a Mølby mural in Liverpool in March 2023. Mølby made a cameo voice-only appearance as a handball commentator in the fifth episode of BBC Two comedy Small Prophets in 2026.

== International career ==
Appearances and goals by national team and year
National team	Year	Apps	Goals
Denmark	1982	3	0
Denmark	1983	2	0
Denmark	1984	7	0
Denmark	1985	5	0
Denmark	1986	9	0
Denmark	1987	2	2
Denmark	1988	2	0
Denmark	1989	1	0
Denmark	1990	2	0
Total		33	2

== Honours ==
=== Player ===
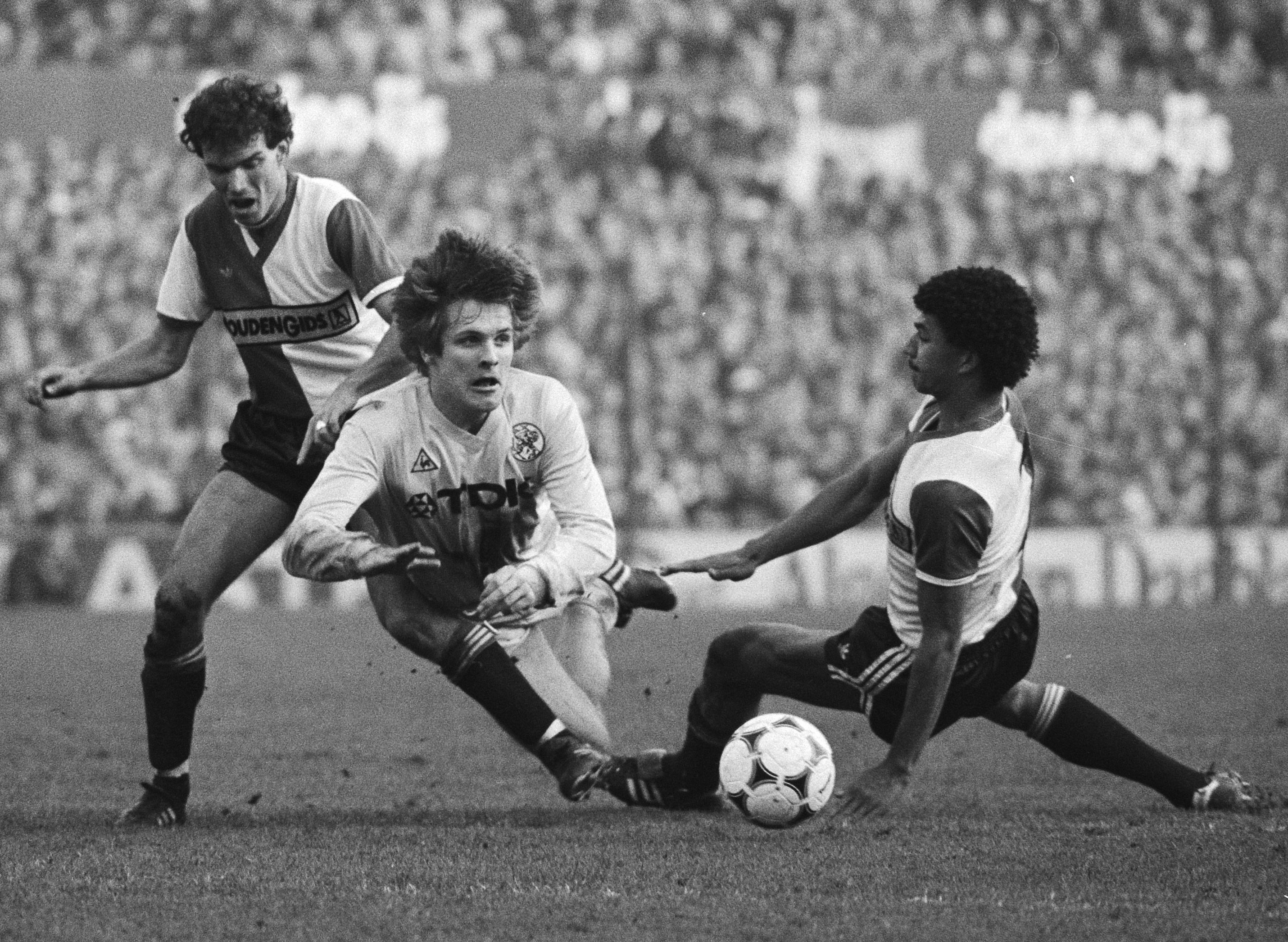
Mølby (centre) playing for Ajax against rivals Feyenoord in 1982

Ajax

- Eredivisie: 1982–83
- KNVB Cup: 1982–83

Liverpool

- Football League First Division: 1985–86, 1987–88, 1989–90
- FA Cup: 1985–86, 1991–92; runner-up: 1987–88
- FA Charity Shield: 1986, 1988, 1989
- Football League Cup runner-up: 1986–87

Individual

- PFA Team of the Year: 1996–97 Third Division
