= Vaughan Ryan =

English footballer

Personal information
- Full name: Vaughan William Ryan
- Date of birth: 2 September 1968 (age 58)
- Place of birth: Westminster, England
- Position: Midfielder

Senior career*
Years	Team	Apps	(Gls)
1986–1992	Wimbledon	82	(3)
1988–1989	→ Sheffield United (loan)	3	(0)
1992–1995	Leyton Orient	44	(0)
Total		129	(3)
- * Club domestic league appearances and goals

Vaughan William Ryan (born 2 September 1968) is an English former professional footballer who played as a midfielder in the Football League for Wimbledon, Sheffield United and Leyton Orient. He was appointed first-team coach at AFC Wimbledon by former Wimbledon teammate Wally Downes in June 2019, continuing in the role under Glyn Hodges.
