= Andy Clement =

Welsh footballer

Personal information
- Full name: Andrew David Clement
- Date of birth: 12 November 1967 (age 58)
- Place of birth: Cardiff, Wales
- Height: 5 ft 8 in (1.73 m)
- Position: Left back

Senior career*
Years	Team	Apps	(Gls)
1986–1989	Wimbledon	26	(0)
1986–1987	→ Bristol Rovers (loan)	6	(0)
1987–1988	→ Newport County (loan)	5	(1)
1989–1990	Woking	?	(?)
1990–1992	Plymouth Argyle	42	(0)
1992–1994	Woking	56	(5)
1994–1997	Slough Town	80	(3)
1997	Yeovil Town	4	(0)

Managerial career
- Bisley
- 2007–2008: Farborough
- 2011: Eversley
- * Club domestic league appearances and goals

Andrew David Clement (born 12 November 1967) is a Welsh former footballer who played as a full back. He appeared in the Football League for Wimbledon, Bristol Rovers, Newport County and Plymouth Argyle.

After finishing his playing career he was manager at Bisley, Farnborough (2007–08) and joint manager with Ian Savage at Eversley in April 2011.

== Honours ==
Woking

- FA Trophy: 1993–94
