= Carlton Fairweather =

English footballer (1961–2025)

Personal information
- Date of birth: 22 September 1961
- Place of birth: Camberwell, London, England
- Date of death: 14 April 2025 (aged 63)
- Height: 5 ft 11 in (1.80 m)
- Position: Winger

Senior career*
Years	Team	Apps	(Gls)
1979–1980	Dulwich Hamlet	10	
1980–1982	Bromley	59	
1982–1984	Tooting & Mitcham Utd	59	(10)
1984–1993	Wimbledon	138	(26)
1984	→ Porin Pallotoverit (loan)	11	(0)
1985	→ Kuopion Pallotoverit (loan)	19	(2)
1993	→ Slough Town (loan)	7	(1)
1993	Carlisle United	12	(1)
1993–1994	Voicelink		
1994–1996	Golden F.C.		
1996–1997	New York Fever		
1998–1999	Connecticut Wolves	30	(0)
1998–1999	→ NY Greek American AA (loan)		
Total		161	(27)

Managerial career
- Wimbledon F.C. U-17
- Wimbledon F.C. U-19
- Wimbledon F.C. Reserves
- Crystal Palace Reserves
- Sunderland (community coach)
- Sunderland High School
- 2014–2017: Sunderland Ladies
- * Club domestic league appearances and goals

Carlton Fairweather (22 September 1961 – 14 April 2025) was an English professional footballer, coach and manager.

Early History raised in East Dulwich by single parent mother: Myrtle Agatha Fairweather. Who came to the UK in 1960 from Jamaica. Carlton attended Dog Kennel Hill primary school and William Penn Community School.

== Playing career ==
Fairweather began his career in Non-League football with Dulwich Hamlet, Bromley and Tooting & Mitcham United where his performances attracted the attentions of Wimbledon.

He signed for the Dons in 1984 and made his debut on New Years Day 1985 against Oldham Athletic. Early in his career at the club he had loan spells at Porin Pallotoverit and Koparit in Finland before establishing himself as a regular in the Wimbledon side. He went on to make 138 league appearances for the club, scoring 26 goals as they established themselves as a First Division club and being founders members of the new FA Premier League in 1992. His best season was the 1986–87 campaign, where he played 23 times in the league and scored eight goals in their first campaign as a First Division club, finishing an impressive sixth and actually leading the table in early September. The highlight of Wimbledon's remarkable success story came at the end of the 1987–88 when they reached the FA Cup final and achieved a shock 1–0 win over Liverpool. However, a broken leg meant that Fairweather was not in the squad for that game, although he had appeared 21 times in the league prior to his injury and scored four goals to help achieve a seventh-place finish. By the end of his time at Wimbledon, he had become the club's "forgotten man", failing to make a single league appearance in his final season and played just 11 times collectively in the two seasons before that.

He signed for Carlisle United in 1993 after falling out of favour at Wimbledon. He left Carlisle after only 12 league appearances (1 goal) to transfer to Golden F.C. He moved to American soccer in 1996 with New York Fever, before going on to represent Greek Americans Soccer Club and Connecticut Wolves.

== Coaching career ==
After retirement Fairweather returned to Wimbledon as a full-time coach in the club's youth academy and managed both the Under-17 and Under-19 teams before being promoted to Reserve team manager. He left Wimbledon to take over as Reserve team manager at Crystal Palace before taking up a position as a community coach with Sunderland A.F.C. and working as a coach at Sunderland High School. In addition he also coached as part of the US Olympic Development Programme. He also played for the "masters" team representing AFC Wimbledon.

In December 2014, Fairweather was appointed head coach of newly promoted FA WSL 1 club Sunderland Ladies. He left the club in early 2017 however.

== Death ==
Fairweather died from pancreatic cancer on 14 April 2025, at the age of 63.
