= Steve McMahon =

English footballer (born 1961)

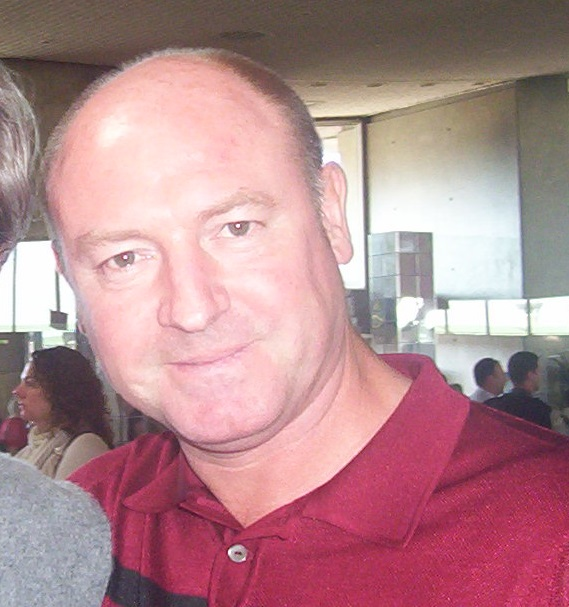

Personal information
- Full name: Stephen Joseph McMahon
- Date of birth: 20 August 1961 (age 65)
- Place of birth: Halewood, England
- Height: 5 ft 7 in (1.70 m)
- Position: Midfielder

Senior career*
Years	Team	Apps	(Gls)
1979–1983	Everton	100	(11)
1983–1985	Aston Villa	75	(7)
1985–1991	Liverpool	204	(29)
1991–1994	Manchester City	87	(1)
1994–1998	Swindon Town	42	(0)
Total		508	(48)

International career
1981–1983	England U21	6	(0)
1984–1987	England B	2	(0)
1988–1990	England	17	(0)

Managerial career
- 1994–1998: Swindon Town
- 2000–2004: Blackpool
- 2005: Perth Glory
- * Club domestic league appearances and goals

Stephen Joseph McMahon (born 20 August 1961) is an English football manager, former professional footballer and current television pundit. As a player, he was a midfielder from 1979 to 1998, most notably playing for Liverpool from 1985 to 1991.

McMahon won three English league championships and two FA Cups at Liverpool. He was twice named in the PFA Team of the Year (1988 and 1990), and in 1988 he came second in the vote for the PFA Player of the Year. McMahon was placed in 42nd position in the '100 Players Who Shook The Kop' poll, which asked Red supporters to name the best 100 Liverpool players of all time. He also played for Everton, Aston Villa and Manchester City, playing in the Premier League for the latter. He was capped 17 times by England.

After his playing career ended, he began his coaching and managing career with Swindon Town, and later managed Blackpool, winning promotion with both of these clubs. He later had a brief spell as manager of Perth Glory in Australia.

== Club playing career ==
=== Everton ===
Halewood-born McMahon started his career at Everton, playing for them as a teenager after appearing at Goodison Park as a ball boy. He made his league debut on 16 August 1980 in the 3–1 defeat to Sunderland at Roker Park, and he went on to be voted the supporters player of the year by the end of the 1980/81 season. His commanding presence in the Toffees midfield earned him the captaincy of the club. After four seasons, including 100 league appearances and 11 league goals McMahon moved to Aston Villa.

=== Aston Villa ===
He joined Aston Villa on 20 May 1983 for £175,000, and made his league debut on 27 August 1983 in the 4–3 derby win over West Bromwich Albion at Villa Park. McMahon settled quickly and established himself in the heart of the Villans midfield. However Villa finished 10th in his first season, while his previous club, Everton, finished 3 places above them in 7th spot. The following season, 1984/85, ended up worse than the previous one as Villa finished in 10th spot again, only this time Everton won the title. In the summer of 1985, Manchester United under their manager Ron Atkinson had chased after McMahon's signature, with Villa informing him of their approach. McMahon however bided his time amid reported interest from United's arch rivals Liverpool, and he states: "I turned down Manchester United to join Liverpool, that's how much I wanted to sign for the club. When the opportunity arose to sign for Liverpool, I took it and it was the best decision of my career."

=== Liverpool ===
"When Steve McMahon plays well, I always think that Liverpool will play well."

— Bob Paisley on McMahon's influence on the side.

McMahon joined Liverpool on 12 September 1985 for £350,000 thus becoming the first signing to be made by new manager Kenny Dalglish, and filling the void left by Graeme Souness over a year earlier. He made his Liverpool debut two days later in the 2–2 league draw with Oxford United at the Manor Ground. His first goal for the club came a week later on 21 September against his former club, Everton. McMahon's 42nd-minute low, powerful 20-yard strike at Goodison turned out to be the winner as the Reds triumphed 3–2.

He played a crucial role in Liverpool's "double" winning side of his debut season, playing 36 games and scoring 10 goals. However, McMahon's joy at winning a League championship medal was tempered slightly by his omission from the starting line-up for the FA Cup final having been unavailable in the run-in after picking up an injury in the spring—his last appearance in the league was against Manchester City at Anfield on 31 March when he scored both goals in a 2–0 win, and five days later in the FA Cup semi-final against Southampton he came off with 10 minutes remaining in what would prove to be his last appearance of the season—which saw Kevin MacDonald come in for him. Having recovered from injury and been declared fit just prior to the final, which was against his former club Everton, the first all Merseyside FA Cup final, McMahon was given the sole substitute's position at Wembley and ended up with a winners' medal when Liverpool won 3–1, though he did not get on to the pitch.

The following season, McMahon started all 50 of the games he appeared in, scoring 14 goals. When Liverpool contested the League Cup final against Arsenal in April 1987, he set up the opening goal for Ian Rush but they ultimately lost the match 2–1. He had earlier scored four goals in Liverpool's record 10–0 victory over Fulham in the same competition. McMahon had also missed a penalty in the same game, which would have made him the only Liverpool player to score five goals in a competitive game that season but scored another hat-trick in the following round against Leicester. In total, he scored nine goals in the League Cup that season, as well as five in the league, although Liverpool endured their second trophyless season in more than a decade.

Dalglish reshaped the side the following season, incorporating new signings John Barnes, Peter Beardsley, John Aldridge and Ray Houghton, with McMahon a key member in the team as the midfield general with his reputation as one of the best hardmen in the game established. McMahon frequently scored for a man in his position as Liverpool won the 1988 League title. Memorable strikes included a 30-yard shot against Manchester United and the opener in a crucial Merseyside derby against Everton at Anfield. When Liverpool reached the FA Cup final again, McMahon was one of the team's two Scousers (along with Aldridge) obliged to perform a localised rap on the official FA Cup final song "Anfield Rap", written in a trend-encapsulating rap and house music style by teammate Craig Johnston. The song got to No. 3 in the UK charts, but Liverpool lost the final at Wembley to Wimbledon.

"I’d kick my own brother if necessary. It's what being a professional footballer is all about."

— McMahon on his fighting spirit.

McMahon was afforded the ultimate respect by Vinnie Jones, who said that if he could stop McMahon, then Wimbledon could stop Liverpool. Jones and McMahon locked horns early on, and Jones fouled McMahon aggressively early on in the game with a two footed tackle. In Jones's autobiography he recounted that he wanted to "take out their top man" and McMahon actually managed to smash Jones in the eye with his elbow on the way down from the tackle, which led to a cut and scar on his face that remained on his face for a while. McMahon clashed with John Fashanu and Dennis Wise frequently throughout the match. In 1988, McMahon came second in the vote for the PFA Players' Player of the Year, the winner being his Liverpool colleague John Barnes.

In 1989 McMahon was again a regular fixture as Liverpool again chased a "double" of League and FA Cup. As one of the local players in the team, he was deeply affected by the Hillsborough disaster during the FA Cup semi-final on 15 April. Liverpool won the FA Cup final against Everton 3–2. McMahon set up the opening goal for Aldridge after just 4 minutes of the final, but they lost the League title in a decider at Anfield against Arsenal.

McMahon again played frequently as Liverpool won back the League title in 1990, and on the day they clinched it against Queens Park Rangers at Anfield he wore the captain's armband for the last 20 minutes, taking over from Alan Hansen who went off injured, and then led the team out against Derby County in the following game the night when the trophy was presented. McMahon said "the proudest moment of my life, the most fantastic honour of my footballing career, was to captain Liverpool". The club lost out on another "double" however when they were beaten 4–3 by Crystal Palace in a thrilling FA Cup semi-final, in which McMahon scored. Souness took over as Liverpool manager in 1991 and he immediately had some disagreements with some senior players including McMahon. In Souness's book, The Management Years, he recounted that several players who were over 30, including McMahon, were looking for bigger contracts at the end of their careers and were prepared to move elsewhere if their terms weren't met. There was also some resentment as new signings like Mark Wright were on bigger salaries, and the senior players wondered why players who had yet to win any trophies at Anfield could be earning more. Souness decided to sell McMahon, Houghton, Beardsley, and Steve Staunton, thus removing some of Liverpool's best players under Dalglish and breaking up a title-winning team. After playing 15 games of the 1991/1992 season, McMahon left Liverpool to join Manchester City for £900,000 on Christmas Eve 1991 after playing 276 games in a stellar career with the Reds, during which time he scored 50 goals.

Souness later admitted that he had sold some key players too soon, when he should have kept them longer until suitable replacements were found. In the end, Souness brought Michael Thomas and Paul Stewart to compete in central midfield, neither of whom were to ever reach the same level as McMahon, as Thomas was beset by injuries and never able to fully replicate the important role vacated by McMahon. Stewart too was blighted with injuries, and only enjoyed anything like regular action in his first season at Anfield, making his final appearance some two years before finally departing in 1996.

=== Manchester City ===
McMahon made his City debut two days later on Boxing Day in a 2–1 win over Norwich City at Maine Road. During his time for City, McMahon was initially seen as someone who would help raise their game due to his aggression and quality, but unfortunately the quality of the team around him was not the same as at Anfield. Niall Quinn recalled in his autobiography that McMahon reminded him of Roy Keane in his intensity and will to win:

Because he expected to win trophies, he could make the players at City feel bad about themselves, because we didn't have the same expectations... He was too intense for us... The lucky-go-happy atmosphere in our squad just didn't appeal to him.

In 1993, McMahon was featured in Vinnie Jones's Soccer's Hard Men video, in which Jones talks about his adoration and respect for other "hard men" from the past and present including Souness, Bryan Robson, Mike Bailey, Norman Hunter, Jack Charlton, Peter Storey, Ron Harris and Nobby Stiles. Jones described McMahon as his "only real rival" in modern-day football for the accolade of "hardest man in football". He described how McMahon got his revenge on him for his early foul in the 1988 FA Cup Final, by kicking Jones to the floor with his studs at Anfield, forcing him to have stitches on a major cut. McMahon played in 87 league matches for the Sky Blues before an offer to become player-manager of Swindon Town tempted him away from Manchester.

== International career ==
"Well Steve McMahon sure can rap, it's about time he had an England cap; so come on Bobby Robson, he's your man; 'cause if anyone can, Macca can!"

— Verse in the 1988 Liverpool F.C. song "Anfield Rap" voiced by commentator Brian Moore.

McMahon first represented England at senior level on 17 February 1988 in a goalless friendly draw against Israel. There had been widespread clamouring in the press for England manager Bobby Robson to select him, and indeed ITV commentator Brian Moore rapped a verse to that effect on the Cup final song, with the last expression, "Macca can!", repeated in a scratch mix manner to emulate Melle Mel's rap which praised Chaka Khan on her 1984 hit, I Feel For You. He was in England's squad for that summer's European Championships in West Germany, and played in the final group game, which England lost 3–1 to the Soviet Union, failing to progress to the semi-finals.

McMahon played on England's 1990 World Cup squad. In the second half of the first group game against Ireland, with England leading 1–0, McMahon failed to control the ball on the edge of the English 18 yard box. Immediately, Republic of Ireland player Kevin Sheedy pounced and drove a left foot shot beyond Peter Shilton in the English goal. McMahon had just come on to the pitch as a substitute for Peter Beardsley. The game ended up as a 1–1 draw. He made further appearances by starting in England's final group match with Egypt and their second round tie with Belgium though did not play in either England's quarter final or semi final matches where both times he was an unused substitute.

He made his 17th and final England appearance on 14 November 1990 in a 1-1 Euro 92 qualifying match draw against Ireland. He never scored for England at senior level.

== Managerial and coaching career ==
=== Swindon Town ===
When he arrived at Swindon Town in November 1994, they had recently been relegated from the Premier League and were battling against a second successive relegation. McMahon joined them as they were preparing for a League Cup match with Derby County. Caretaker manager Andy Rowland picked the team, and the Town progressed to the next round. McMahon took full control for the next game – a league match at Southend – and he picked himself in the starting line-up. The Town lost 2–0, and McMahon was sent off. His first victory came with a 2–1 scoreline against top-of-the-table Middlesbrough.

As transfer deadline day approached, rumours were rife that leading goalscorer, Jan Åge Fjørtoft, would be leaving the club – most sources quoting a fee of between £3m and £4m. When the day finally came, Fjørtoft was sold for £1.3m – McMahon saying that no other offers were on the table. After Fjørtoft left, the goals dried up. The Town failed to score in six of the next eight matches, and were relegated to Division Two.

The Town bounced back the following season, winning the Second Division championship. McMahon won three manager of the month awards, and the manager of the year. The two top scorers that season were McMahon signings: Wayne Allison, arriving from Bristol City, and Steve Finney, from Manchester City, and the only real problems the Town had were breaking down the opposition's stubborn defence, with most sides playing for a draw.

The next two seasons followed similar patterns – a decent start, followed by a poor run-in. In 1996–97, Town held a mid-table position right up until the middle of March, but then scored just two goals in their last ten games – getting defeated 7–0 at Bolton Wanderers, 5–1 at Oldham Athletic and 4–0 at Ipswich Town in the process – ending up in 19th place.

In August 1996, following the departure of Alan Ball as Manchester City manager, McMahon was linked with a return to Maine Road as manager, but speculation that he would take the City job was swiftly ended when he signed a new five-year contract as Swindon manager.

The following season's demise was far more dramatic. A win at Portsmouth on 31 October 1997 took the Town to the top of the table, a position they held until the middle of November. They remained in a play-off position up until the middle of December, and then won just three of the remaining 24 matches, scoring just twelve goals. Again the Town slumped to heavy defeats – 6–0 at Manchester City, 6–0 at Middlesbrough and 5–0 at Norwich City.

When the 1998–99 season kicked off, Town had no wins and just three goals (two of which were own goals) in the first five games, the calls for McMahon's head began to be heard. Chairman Rikki Hunt and McMahon seemed united – McMahon saying he wouldn't resign, Hunt saying he wouldn't sack him. Two consecutive derby wins, against Bristol City and Oxford United, only strengthened their position. This was followed by a 5–2 defeat at Portsmouth – and when Watford then won 4–1 at the County Ground, the fans held an on-pitch protest, sitting in the centre circle at the end of the match, demonstrating that both McMahon and Hunt should resign. McMahon resigned on 22 September 1998.

=== Blackpool ===
His next stop came at Blackpool, with whom he signed an 18-month contract on 7 January 2000. He stated that the job was a "great opportunity" and that his main task was to "keep us afloat this year and get us in a position where we can be safe". It was not to be, however: in May they were relegated to Division Three, but McMahon took them to promotion via the play-offs the following season and also won two Football League Trophies in three years. He signed a new contract with the club on 8 February 2001 that would see him remain in charge until at least the end of the 2002–03 season.

He left Blackpool following an argument over funds just before the final game of the 2003–04 season, having resigned midway through the season, only to burst in on 15 January press conference announcing his decision to withdraw the resignation following a talk with chairman Karl Oyston. At the time of his departure, McMahon was the fifth-longest-serving Blackpool manager in terms of Football League games in charge.

=== Perth Glory ===
He was signed in early 2005 as the manager of Perth Glory FC for the inaugural Australian A-League Men season. However his tenure at the club was short and he left the club in December 2005, part way through the season.

== Media career ==
In early February 2006 through 2007, McMahon signed an initial eighteen-month contract to work as a television pundit for Asia-based ESPN Star Sports, and subsequently extended his contract by three years. There, he worked alongside the likes of John Dykes as commentators, written his own blog, and is based in Singapore. He has also been responsible for recruiting other former English football stars such as Les Ferdinand and fellow ex-Liverpool players, Ian Rush and Steve McManaman.

== First XI ==
In 2012–13, McMahon was featured in First XI, a reality television show that features amateur players and him being the head coach to guide them to professional footballing. They faced tough competitions and also went to Thailand and Spain to play friendly matches with BC Tero and Real Madrid Second Team. At the end of the season, they faced the All Stars team featuring former Singapore football players, Des Walker, as well as former Liverpool legends Robbie Fowler and Steve Harkness. They lost 0–1 in 2012 and lost again 0–3 in 2013.

=== Profitable Group ===
McMahon joined Profitable Group on their board of Directors as Group Commercial Director in March 2008, leading the Group's Strategic Sports Investment Division. It was revealed in the News of the World that the group had tried to purchase his former club, Everton, but were knocked back. In late July 2009, McMahon explained that Profitable Group had ended its interest in buying the club due to a lack of "communication and response" from Bill Kenwright.

== Personal life ==
McMahon's brother, John, is a former footballer and now coach.

McMahon is married to Julie and has two sons, Stephen and Paul.

In December 2019, he was diagnosed with prostate cancer at the age of 58. He had the tumour removed in January 2020 at Liverpool's Royal Hospital.

== Managerial statistics ==
Team	From	To	Record				
Team	From	To	G	W	D	L	Win %
Swindon Town	1 December 1994	23 September 1998	204	75	49	80	36.76
Blackpool	7 January 2000	6 June 2004	93	31	24	38	33.33
Perth Glory FC	25 January 2005	7 December 2005	16	6	4	6	37.50
Total			313	112	77	124	35.78

== Honours ==
=== Player ===
Liverpool

- Football League First Division: 1985–86, 1987–88, 1989–90
- FA Cup: 1985–86, 1988–89; runner-up: 1987–88
- FA Charity Shield: 1986, 1988, 1989, 1990
- Football League Cup runner-up: 1986–87

Swindon Town

- Football League Second Division: 1995–96

Individual

- PFA Team of the Year: 1987–88 First Division, 1989–90 First Division

=== Manager ===
Swindon Town

- Football League Second Division: 1995–96

Blackpool

- Football League Third Division play-offs: 2001
- Football League Trophy: 2001–02, 2003–04
