= Anfield Rap =

"Anfield Rap (Red Machine in Full Effect)"

Single by Liverpool F.C.
- Released: 3 May 1988
- Studio: Motor Museum
- Label: Virgin
- Songwriters: Paul Gainford, Craig Johnston, Derek B, and Mary Byker

Liverpool F.C. singles chronology
"Sitting on Top of the World" (1986)	"Anfield Rap (Red Machine in Full Effect)" (1988)	"Pass & Move (It's the Liverpool Groove)" (1996)

"Anfield Rap (Red Machine in Full Effect)" was a song released by members of Liverpool F.C. before the 1988 FA Cup Final against Wimbledon F.C. The song reached number 3 in the UK Singles Chart. The song was co-written by Paul Gainford, Liverpool midfielder Craig Johnston, rapper Derek B and Mary Byker from Gaye Bykers on Acid. The song was met with mixed reviews; the tune has become a cult classic among Liverpool fans, but critics often cite it as one of the worst sports songs of all time. Liverpool would go on to lose the final in one of the biggest upsets in the history of the competition.

== Style ==
The song is a parody of a number of hip hop tracks, notably the intro from LL Cool J's "Rock the Bells" and Eric B. & Rakim's "I Know You Got Soul" (which sampled the opening drum roll from Funkadelic's "You'll Like It Too"). The song also featured the guitar riff (and the Ahhhhh-ahhhhh-ahhhhh element) from "Twist And Shout" by The Beatles who hailed from Liverpool.

== Participants ==
The track featured John Aldridge and Steve McMahon, who (along with Gary Ablett) were the only native Liverpudlians in the regular line up at the time, making fun of the accents of the other players. The other players featured were John Barnes, Bruce Grobbelaar, Ian Rush, Craig Johnston, Kevin MacDonald, Gary Gillespie, Steve Nicol, Ronnie Whelan, Alan Hansen, Ray Houghton, Jim Beglin, Nigel Spackman, Colin Bridge and Jan Molby, along with manager Kenny Dalglish. One verse of the song was performed by then-ITV football commentator Brian Moore. There were also archived voice clips from the club's former manager Bill Shankly.
