= Crazy Gang =

Crazy Gang may refer to:

- Crazy Gang (football), a nickname for the Wimbledon football team of the 1980s and the 1990s
- Crazy Gang (comedy group), a group of British entertainers formed in the 1930s
- Crazy Gang (comics), a band of Marvel Comics criminals modeled after Alice In Wonderland characters
