= Soccer's Hard Men =

- Front cover
- Starring: Vinnie Jones
- Release date: 19 October 1992
- Running time: 78 minutes
- Country: United Kingdom
- Language: English

Soccer's Hard Men is a 1992 football video by Video Vision, presented by then-footballer and current actor Vinnie Jones. The video featured footage of British players (some still playing at the time and others who had by then retired) who had reputations for aggressive or physical styles of play, including Graeme Souness, Bryan Robson, Nobby Stiles, Norman Hunter, Jack Charlton, Steve McMahon, Tommy Smith, Peter Storey, Ron "Chopper Harris" and Billy Bremner. Publicity for the video promoted it as "the toughest football video in history". These and similar claims prompted some commentators to accuse the video of glorifying foul play. Jones' commentary, in which he described tricks used by so called "hard man" players (a term commonly used to describe physically intimidating footballers) to intimidate opponents, was criticised by commentators and football authorities

The clubs associated with players featured in the video publicly distanced themselves from its contents. Sam Hammam, chairman of Wimbledon, whose "Crazy Gang" featured heavily in the video, said the production was "nothing to do with Wimbledon", describing Jones (who played for Wimbledon) as "a mosquito brain", and banning the sale of the video in the club shop. The Football Association formally charged Jones with bringing the game into disrepute on 30 September 1992, with the video still yet to be released. Following a hearing on 17 November, Jones was fined a record £20,000, surpassing a fine of £8,500 issued to Paul McGrath three years earlier. Jones also received a suspended sentence with the potential for a six-month ban, though the period of the suspended sentence expired without the ban being enacted.

The Professional Footballers' Association (PFA) attempted to bring an injunction to ban the video, but abandoned their efforts after being advised that it was not legally viable. PFA chief executive Gordon Taylor later gave evidence in support of Jones at an appeal hearing, held in February 1993. Jones appealed the decision; however, the appeal panel rejected the appeal and upheld the punishment.

According to sales figures from the London bookshop Sportspages, the video ranked second among sports video sales during the pre-Christmas period of 1992.
