= Bedmond =

- Village
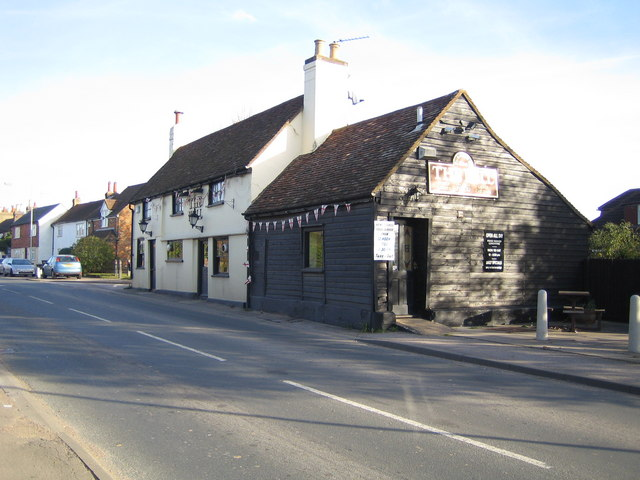
- The Bell Inn, High Street

- Location within Hertfordshire
- OS grid reference: TL0903
- Civil parish: Abbots Langley
- District: Three Rivers
- Shire county: Hertfordshire
- Region: East
- Country: England
- Sovereign state: United Kingdom
- Post town: ABBOTS LANGLEY
- Postcode district: WD5
- Dialling code: 01923
- Police: Hertfordshire
- Fire: Hertfordshire
- Ambulance: East of England
- UK Parliament: St. Albans

Bedmond is a village in the civil parish of Abbots Langley, in the Three Rivers district of Hertfordshire, England. It is located around one mile (1.6 km) north of the larger village of Abbots Langley.

Bedmond is the probable birthplace of Nicholas Breakspear, later Pope Adrian IV, the only Englishman to ever be Pope, who is believed to have been born at Breakspear Farm c. 1100. The site where his home stood is marked by a plaque. (Note: The plaque to Nicholas Breakspear sits at the south end of a roadside island on Bedmond Road approximately 100 metres (330 ft) south of its junction with East Lane. (51.718596°N 0.411067°W))

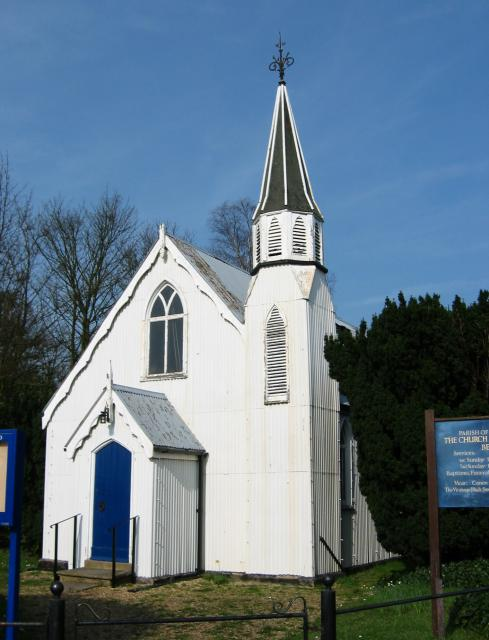
The Church of The Ascension in Bedmond.

The Anglican Church of the Ascension in Bedmond is a rare example of a surviving "tin tabernacle", a pre-fabricated church building made from corrugated galvanised iron and one of only a few remaining in use for worship in the country. It was built in 1880 at a cost of £80, which was donated by the wife of the squire. It became a Grade-II listed building in 1978.

== People ==
Vinnie Jones (born 1965), former Wimbledon, Leeds United and Wales international footballer and actor, lived in Bedmond, went to its juror school and started his football career in its football club.
