= 1988 FA Cup final =

English association football match

- Event: 1987–88 FA Cup
Liverpool	Wimbledon
0	1
- Date: 14 May 1988
- Venue: Wembley Stadium, London
- Man of the Match: Dave Beasant (Wimbledon)
- Referee: Brian Hill (Northamptonshire)
- Attendance: 98,203
- Weather: Sunny; 23 °C (73 °F)

The 1988 FA Cup final was the 107th final of the FA Cup. It took place on Saturday 14 May 1988 at Wembley Stadium and was contested between Wimbledon and Liverpool, the dominant English club side of the 1980s and newly crowned league champions.

In one of the biggest shocks in the entire history of the competition, Lawrie Sanchez's solitary goal of the game ensured Wimbledon's 1–0 victory over Liverpool, and won them their only FA Cup in their history; they had just completed their second season in the First Division and had only been in the Football League for 11 years. The final also featured the first ever penalty save in an FA Cup final, by Dave Beasant from John Aldridge. Beasant is often mistakenly believed to have been the first goalkeeper to captain a winning side in an FA Cup Final but this honour falls to Major William Merriman of the Royal Engineers who captained his side to victory in 1875.

It was the last FA Cup final to be broadcast live simultaneously by both the BBC and ITV until 2022 - this happened at every final since 1958. Wimbledon's victory ended Liverpool's bid to become the first team to win the Double twice, a feat that was eventually achieved by rivals Manchester United in 1996. The game was the last that former England international Laurie Cunningham would play in England, before his death in Spain in 1989.

== Road to Wembley ==
=== Liverpool ===
Round	Opposition	Score
3rd Replay	Stoke City (A) Stoke City (H)	0–0 1–0
4th	Aston Villa (A)	0–2
5th	Everton (A)	0–1
QF	Manchester City (A)	0–4
SF	Nottingham Forest (N)	2–1
Key: (H) = Home venue; (A) = Away venue; (N) = Neutral venue.

=== Wimbledon ===
Round	Opposition	Score
3rd	West Bromwich Albion (H)	4–1
4th	Mansfield Town (A)	1–2
5th	Newcastle United (A)	1–3
QF	Watford (H)	2–1
SF	Luton Town (N)	2–1
Key: (H) = Home venue; (A) = Away venue; (N) = Neutral venue.

== Build-up ==
Liverpool was once again crowned champion of the First Division.They were the giants of English football during the 1980s. Wimbledon finished seventh in the First Division that season, only their second year in the top tier. Liverpool, with a team full of international star players, were favoured to win the FA Cup by experts, as they had secured their 17th league title by playing in an exciting and flamboyant style. Whereas Wimbledon, which had been playing in the semi-professional Southern Football League just eleven years earlier, were dismissed by many as being technically limited, relying primarily on their strength. They were thought to have almost no chance of beating their more prestigious opponents.

== Match summary ==
Wimbledon took the lead in the 37th minute, when Lawrie Sanchez's looping header from six yards out, from a Dennis Wise free kick on the left, went across goalkeeper Bruce Grobbelaar and into the right of the net. Liverpool created a host of chances, including a chipped goal over the goalkeeper by Peter Beardsley in the first half which was disallowed as the referee had already awarded a free kick to Liverpool, but were unable to find a way past Wimbledon goalkeeper Dave Beasant. The Merseysiders were awarded a penalty on the hour mark following a foul by Clive Goodyear on John Aldridge. However, Aldridge's penalty was saved by Beasant's diving save to his left, thus Beasant became the first keeper to save a penalty in a Wembley FA Cup final. The Londoners survived more pressure from Liverpool to secure their only major trophy and a notable upset in FA Cup Final history. Captain Beasant became the second goalkeeper to lift the FA Cup as a result (Royal Engineers goalkeeper and captain Major William Merriman lifted the Cup in 1875). After the final whistle John Motson, who was commentating for the BBC, delivered his famous line: "The Crazy Gang have beaten the Culture Club."

== Europe ==
Although they had won the Cup, Wimbledon were prevented from competing in the European Cup Winners' Cup the following season due to the ongoing ban on all English teams from European competitions following the Heysel disaster in 1985. At the time of the final, it was hoped that the ban would be rescinded, but after a number of violent incidents involving English fans during the 1988 European Championships, the FA withdrew their application for readmission.

== Match details ==
14 May 1988
15:00 BST

Liverpool	0–1	Wimbledon
Aldridge (penalty missed) 60	Report	Sanchez 37'

Wembley Stadium, London
Attendance: 98,203
Referee: Brian Hill

Liverpool	Wimbledon

GK	1	(Zimbabwe) Bruce Grobbelaar
CB	2	(Scotland) Gary Gillespie
CB	3	(England) Gary Ablett
CB	6	(Scotland) Alan Hansen (c)
DM	5	(England) Nigel Spackman	(substituted off) 74'
RM	4	(Scotland) Steve Nicol
CM	9	(Republic of Ireland) Ray Houghton
CM	11	(England) Steve McMahon
LM	10	(England) John Barnes
CF	8	(Republic of Ireland) John Aldridge	(substituted off) 64'
CF	7	(England) Peter Beardsley
Substitutes:
MF	12	(Australia) Craig Johnston	(substituted on) 64'
MF	14	(Denmark) Jan Mølby	(substituted on) 74'
Manager:
(Scotland) Kenny Dalglish

GK	1	(England) Dave Beasant (c)
RB	2	(England) Clive Goodyear
CB	5	(Wales) Eric Young
CB	6	(England) Andy Thorn
LB	3	(Republic of Ireland) Terry Phelan
CM	10	(Northern Ireland) Lawrie Sanchez
CM	4	(Wales) Vinnie Jones
CM	11	(England) Dennis Wise
RF	8	(England) Alan Cork	(substituted off) 56'
CF	9	(England) John Fashanu
LF	7	(England) Terry Gibson	(substituted off) 63'
Substitutes:
DF	12	(England) John Scales	(substituted on) 63'
MF	14	(England) Laurie Cunningham	(substituted on) 56'
Manager:
(England) Bobby Gould

Match rules

- 90 minutes
- 30 minutes of extra-time if necessary
- Replay if scores still level
- Two named substitutes
- Maximum of two substitutions

== See also ==
- Crazy Gang (football)
