= Vinnie Jones =

English professional footballer and actor (born 1965)

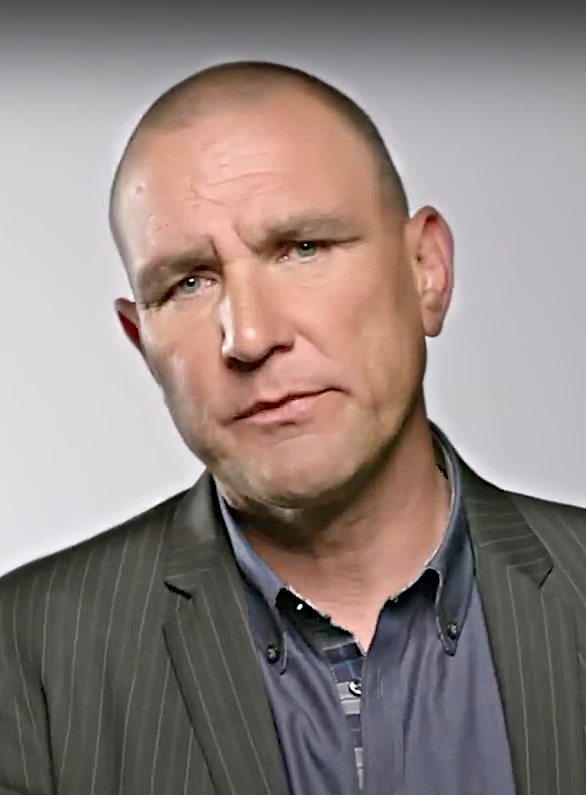
- Jones in 2013
- Born: Vincent Peter Jones; 5 January 1965 (age 61); Watford, Hertfordshire, England
- Occupations: Actor; presenter; footballer
- Spouse: Tanya Terry (m. 1994; died 2019)
- Children: 2
Association football career
- Position: Midfielder
Youth career
- 1975–1977: Bedmond
Senior career*
Years	Team	Apps	(Gls)
1984–1986	Wealdstone	38	(2)
1986	→ IFK Holmsund (loan)	22	(1)
1986–1989	Wimbledon	77	(9)
1989–1990	Leeds United	46	(5)
1990–1991	Sheffield United	35	(2)
1991–1992	Chelsea	42	(4)
1992–1998	Wimbledon	177	(12)
1998–1999	Queens Park Rangers	9	(1)
Total		446	(36)
International career
1994–1997	Wales	9	(0)
- * Club domestic league appearances and goals

Vincent Peter Jones (born 5 January 1965) is a British actor, presenter, and former professional footballer who played as a defensive midfielder.

Jones played professionally from 1984 to 1999, notably for Wimbledon, Leeds United, Sheffield United, Chelsea, and Queens Park Rangers. He also played for and captained the Welsh national team, having qualified through a Welsh grandparent. Best remembered for his time at Wimbledon as a pivotal member of the famous "Crazy Gang", he won the 1988 FA Cup final with the London side, a club for which he played over 200 games during two spells between 1986 and 1998. He played 184 games in the Premier League, in which he scored 13 goals. Jones gained a reputation for being one of the hardest footballers in history, with his highly aggressive and physically uncompromising style of play, an image which has often led to him being typecast in his film career as violent criminals and thugs.

As an actor, his film and television career began with Lock, Stock and Two Smoking Barrels (1998), for which he won an Empire Award for Best Newcomer. Then for Snatch (2000), he won the Empire Award for Best British Actor. Other notable credits include Gone in 60 Seconds (2000), Mean Machine (2001), EuroTrip (2004), Extras (2005), X-Men: The Last Stand (2006), The Riddle (2007), The Midnight Meat Train (2008), Year One (2009), The Cape (2011), Fire with Fire (2012), The Musketeers (2014), MacGyver (2016), NCIS: Los Angeles (2019) and The Big Ugly (2020). Since 2024, he has starred in Guy Ritchie's action comedy series The Gentlemen.

== Early life ==
Vincent Peter Jones was born on 5 January 1965, in Watford, Hertfordshire, the son of Glenda (née Harris) and gamekeeper Peter Jones. He attended schools in nearby Bedmond and Abbots Langley, and captained his school's football team, and played for his local football team in the village of Bedmond, in the Three Rivers District of Hertfordshire. One of his grandmothers was Irish from Dublin, and the other was Welsh, which later qualified him to play for Wales.

== Football career ==
=== Club career ===
==== Wealdstone ====
Having begun playing as a teenager in local amateur football, a 19-year-old Jones was signed on semi-professional terms by Wealdstone of the Alliance Premier League in 1984. A young addition to the experienced Wealdstone team, which was soon to become the first ever club to achieve the non-league "double" in the 1984–85 season, he was a non-playing squad member in the club's victory at Wembley Stadium in the 1985 FA Trophy final. He combined playing football with working as a hod carrier on construction sites.

==== Loan to IFK Holmsund ====
He played one season on loan with Swedish club IFK Holmsund in 1986, helping to lead the team to the Division 3 Mellersta Norrland title.

==== Wimbledon ====
In the autumn of 1986, a 21-year-old Jones became a full-time professional footballer when he was signed by Wimbledon of the First Division, who paid Wealdstone £10,000 for him. He scored in only his second appearance for Wimbledon on 29 November 1986, in a 1–0 win over Manchester United. He was a member of the Wimbledon team which won the FA Cup in 1988, beating league champions Liverpool 1–0 in the final. Wimbledon cemented their status as a formidable First Division side during this time, with Jones making his name as an enthusiastic and uncompromisingly tough midfielder and a leading member of Wimbledon's famed Crazy Gang.

==== Leeds United ====
Jones was transferred from Wimbledon to Leeds United for a fee of £650,000 in June 1989, and played in all but one league game as Leeds finished as champions of the Second Division, winning promotion to the First Division in 1990. Jones proved he could thrive even when playing a more restrained style, and under the stewardship of Howard Wilkinson, he received only three yellow cards during the entire season.

==== Sheffield United ====
Jones left Leeds United early in the 1990–91 season after losing his regular first-team place to youngsters David Batty and Gary Speed. His former Wimbledon manager Dave Bassett signed him for Sheffield United in September 1990 for a transfer fee of £700,000. He played 35 matches for The Blades in the First Division, scoring two goals.

==== Chelsea ====
Jones was then sold to Chelsea a year later on 30 August 1991, for a fee of £575,000. Jones made his Chelsea debut one day after his signing in the 4–1 win against Luton. On 18 September 1991, Jones scored his first goal for the club in the 2–0 win against Aston Villa. He went on to make 52 total appearances for Chelsea, scoring 7 goals and receiving only 3 yellow cards.

==== Return to Wimbledon ====
After just one season at Stamford Bridge, he was back with Wimbledon in the early stages of the 1992–93 season, when the Premier League had just been formed. He helped Wimbledon equal their best ever league finish in 1993–94, when they finished sixth in the Premier League. Three seasons later, he contributed to another strong season for the club, who reached the semi-finals of both the FA Cup and the League Cup, and finished eighth in the Premier League. That season he scored the winning goal as Wimbledon won 1–0 against Arsenal at Highbury.

==== Queens Park Rangers ====
His second exit from Wimbledon came when he became player/coach of QPR in early 1998, scoring on his debut against Huddersfield Town. He announced his retirement from football in early 1999 at the age of 34.

== International career ==
In December 1994 Jones was named in the Welsh national squad, qualifying under FIFA rules via his Ruthin-born maternal grandfather. He had previously sought to play for the Republic of Ireland due to eligibility through a grandparent. He made his international debut under Mike Smith for Wales on 14 December 1994, in a 3–0 home defeat to Bulgaria in the Euro 96 qualifiers. When Smith was replaced as Wales manager by Jones's former Wimbledon manager Bobby Gould a few months later, he remained a regular member of the Welsh national squad. He was capped nine times for Wales, the last of which came on 29 March 1997 in a 2–1 defeat to Belgium in a World Cup qualifier, also at Cardiff Arms Park.

Jones' international call-up was however greeted with consternation by some and was even ridiculed by Jimmy Greaves, who said, "Well, stone me! We've had cocaine, bribery and Arsenal scoring two goals at home. But just when you thought there were truly no surprises left in football, Vinnie Jones turns out to be an international player!".

=== Playing style ===
Jones was renowned for his "hard man" persona and his very tough, uncompromising style of play on the pitch. He was sent off a total of 12 times in his career, in an era when referees generally took a much more lenient view of overly aggressive play and mistimed tackles.

He holds the record for the quickest ever booking in a football match, being cautioned just five seconds after kick-off for a foul on the opposition player Dane Whitehouse, in an FA Cup tie between Chelsea and Sheffield United in 1992. In his autobiography, he recalls: "I must have been too high, too wild, too strong or too early, because, after three seconds, I could hardly have been too bloody late!"

In an incident in February 1988, Jones was famously photographed covertly grabbing Paul Gascoigne by his testicles during a league game for Wimbledon against Newcastle United.

=== Controversies ===
He also was the presenter of the Soccer's Hard Men video released in 1992, which featured archived footage of him and many other "hard men" of the game, and included advice for budding "hard men". After the release of the video, Jones was fined £20,000 and given a six-month ban (suspended for three years) for "bringing the game into disrepute". Wimbledon chairman Sam Hammam branded Jones a "mosquito brain". After this incident, Jones failed to stay out of trouble. After exceeding 40 disciplinary points that season, he was once again summoned to Lancaster Gate, the headquarters of The Football Association, but failed to appear. The FA banned Jones indefinitely. Jones explained that he had "mixed up" the date of the hearing, for which he received a four-match ban and was told by Football Association officials to "grow up". Jones commented later: "The FA have given me a pat on the back. I've taken violence off the terracing and onto the pitch" – an obvious reference to the football hooliganism problem which had blighted the English game during the 1970s and 1980s.

In 1995, Jones was accused of biting the nose of a journalist in a hotel following the abandoned Republic of Ireland–England match in Dublin. Jones later apologised and was fined and suspended by Wimbledon FC.

=== Other football activities ===
Jones made an appearance for Carlisle United, coming on as a second-half substitute in 2001 in a friendly against Irish team Shelbourne, teaming up with friend Roddy Collins who was manager at the time. In June 2010, he released a press statement stating that he was donating his 1988 FA Cup winners medal to the fans of AFC Wimbledon, wishing the club the best for the future. The medal is displayed at the club's stadium. He briefly served as club president of non-league Soham Town Rangers.

In 2020, Jones appeared on the ITV show Harry's Heroes, It featured former football manager Harry Redknapp attempting get a squad of former England international footballers back fit and healthy for one last game, vs a Germany Legends team. Despite playing for Wales during his professional career, Jones briefly took part in Season Two and played for the England legends in one of their warm up games against San Marino veterans.

== Acting career ==
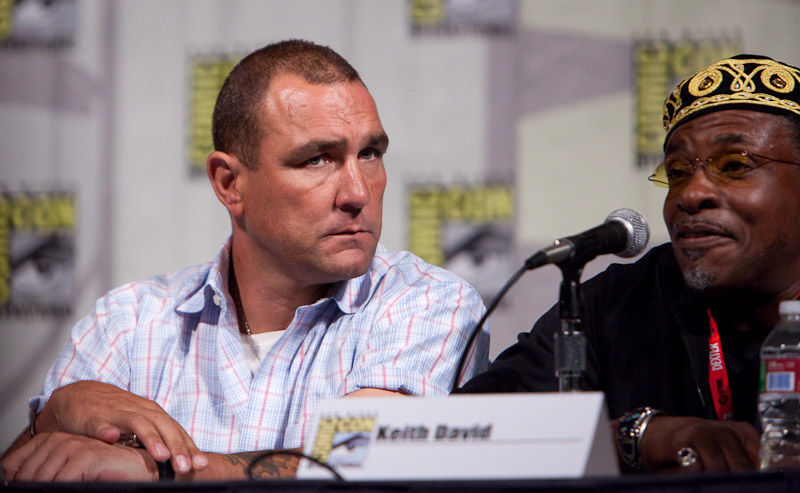
Jones with Keith David in 2010

In 1998, Jones made his film debut in Guy Ritchie's crime comedy Lock, Stock and Two Smoking Barrels, in which he played a mob enforcer named Big Chris. For his performance, he won the Empire Award for Best Newcomer in 1999.

He has since been typecast in similar roles as criminals or villains, including the dapper gun-for-hire "Bullet-Tooth Tony" in Guy Ritchie's 2000 follow up Snatch, for which Jones won the Best British Actor at the 6th Empire Awards in 2001. Jones became known to American audiences in the 2000 film remake of Gone in 60 Seconds, in which he played Sphinx. Although this was a major role with significant screen time, he only had one line of dialogue because his character was a silent, tough brawler. He teamed up with director Dominic Sena again the following year for the thriller Swordfish, in which he played one of John Travolta's henchmen.

Jones played Danny Meehan in Mean Machine, a 2001 British remake of the Burt Reynolds film The Longest Yard. He played a former captain of the England national football team, who is sent to prison and subsequently takes control of a team of inmates who play against the prison guards' team. In the 2004 Japanese film Survive Style 5+, he played a hitman from Britain. He played another football role as Mad Maynard, the leader of a Manchester United football hooligan firm, in the 2004 comedy film EuroTrip. His next role was in the 2006 film, X-Men: The Last Stand, as the comic book villain Juggernaut, alongside Hugh Jackman and Halle Berry. He said that he would like to play Juggernaut in a spin-off; however, he turned down an offer to reprise the role in Deadpool & Wolverine. One of his lines in the film ("Don't you know who I am? I'm the Juggernaut, bitch!") was based on a pre-existing Internet parody. The same year, he was featured in another football film, She's the Man, as the coach of the Illyria team. In 2007, he played McStarley in The Condemned, a film about death row inmates forced to fight to the death on a remote island.

Jones was a housemate on the reality television show Celebrity Big Brother 7 in 2010, and celebrated his 45th birthday while he participated. He received loud cheers as he entered the house and was the favourite to win going into the house, but he did not maintain popularity with the public; the crowd chanted "get Vinnie out" on the final night and booed him as he left the house after he finished in third place. Speaking of his experience on the show, he said: "It was like One Flew Over the Cuckoo's Nest in there – and I was Jack Nicholson."

Jones played a professional killer in the Kazakhstani film Liquidator in 2011. His character is an elite assassin invited to eliminate the main character. Producers of the film dealt with the Kazakh-to-English language barrier by writing Jones' character as a mute who does not speak. In the same year, he played Zed in the movie Blood Out. He played a role in the Hungarian film The Magic Boys in 2012. That same year, he voiced Freddie the Dog in Madagascar 3: Europe's Most Wanted. He co-starred alongside Sylvester Stallone and Arnold Schwarzenegger in the action-thriller Escape Plan, released in 2013, and was featured with Danny Trejo in the 2014 horror-thriller Reaper.

In 2021, Jones competed in the third season of the Australian version of The Masked Singer as "Volcano". He was the first contestant eliminated.

=== Pro wrestling ===
In December 1998, Jones appeared at WWF Capital Carnage, a UK exclusive pro wrestling pay-per-view promoted by the WWF where he served as a special guest enforcer during the show's main event, being noted for his "hard man" image. Jones performed a live interview earlier in the show regarding his role in the main event, when asked if he was ready to get physical with any of the four wrestlers, Jones said "Us British mix it with anybody!" Jones got into a fight with fellow enforcer the Big Boss Man at the beginning of the main event, which saw him get ejected by referee Gerald Brisco, showing him a red card in reference to Jones' time as a footballer.

== Personal life ==
Jones was born in Watford and raised in Garston, having played football as a child on the same local team as Bradley Walsh.

Having met Tanya Terry when they were both 12 years old and next-door neighbours in Watford, Jones later married her in 1994. Tanya had a daughter by her first husband, footballer Steve Terry. Jones has a son born in 1991, Aaron Elliston-Jones, with his ex-girlfriend Mylene Elliston.

In November 2013, Jones received treatment after finding signs of skin cancer below his eye. This was a removal procedure as a precaution. Many years prior, his wife was also diagnosed with skin cancer, which then spread to her brain by 2018. Jones and their daughter Kaley were at her bedside during her death from cancer on 6 July 2019. He discussed her death during an appearance on Piers Morgan's Life Stories in September 2020, and said that he does not plan to remarry.

Jones penned an autobiography called Vinnie: The Autobiography, which was later revised and reprinted to include information on his first film appearance.

After the end of his football career, Jones was involved in both greyhound racing and horse racing, and owned a racehorse called Sixty Seconds.

Since 2021, he has divided his time between Los Angeles and Petworth, West Sussex.

In 2015, he described himself as a supporter of the Conservative Party, saying that he was "very proud of being British, very pro the monarchy, and very Conservative".

=== Criminal charges ===
Jones was convicted in June 1998 of assault occasioning actual bodily harm and criminal damage against a neighbour in November 1997.

Jones was convicted in December 2003 of assault and threatening behaviour on an aircraft for an air rage incident, during which he slapped a passenger in the face and threatened to murder the cabin crew while drunk on an aircraft. He was fined £1,100 and ordered to perform 80 hours of community service. As a result of the conviction, Hertfordshire Constabulary revoked Jones' firearms licence and seized the weapons listed on the licence.

== Career statistics ==
Appearances and goals by club, season and competition
Club	Season	League			FA Cup		League Cup		Other		Total	
Club	Season	Division	Apps	Goals	Apps	Goals	Apps	Goals	Apps	Goals	Apps	Goals
Wealdstone	1984–85	Alliance Premier League	12	0	0	0	—		—		12	0
Wealdstone	1985–86	Alliance Premier League	26	2	1	0	—		—		27	2
Wealdstone	Total		38	2	1	0	—		—		39	2
IFK Holmsund (loan)	1986	Division 3 Mellersta Norrland	22	1	0	0	—		—		22	1
Wimbledon	1986–87	First Division	22	4	4	1	2	0	—		28	5
Wimbledon	1987–88	First Division	24	2	6	0	4	0	—		34	2
Wimbledon	1988–89	First Division	31	3	4	0	5	0	1 (Note: Appearance(s) in Full Members' Cup)	0	41	3
Wimbledon	Total		77	9	14	1	11	0	1	0	103	10
Leeds United	1989–90	Second Division	45	5	1	0	2	0	4	0	52	5
Leeds United	1990–91	First Division	1	0	0	0	0	0	—		1	0
Leeds United	Total		46	5	1	0	2	0	4	0	53	5
Sheffield United	1990–91	First Division	31	2	1	0	4	0	1	0	37	2
Sheffield United	1991–92	First Division	4	0	0	0	0	0	—		4	0
Sheffield United	Total		35	2	1	0	4	0	1	0	41	2
Chelsea	1991–92	First Division	35	3	4	1	1	0	5	2	45	6
Chelsea	1992–93	Premier League	7	1	0	0	0	0	—		7	1
Chelsea	Total		42	4	4	1	1	0	5	2	52	7
Wimbledon	1992–93	Premier League	27	1	0	0	0	0	—		27	1
Wimbledon	1993–94	Premier League	33	2	0	0	2	0	—		35	2
Wimbledon	1994–95	Premier League	33	3	2	0	2	0	—		37	3
Wimbledon	1995–96	Premier League	31	3	3	0	2	0	—		36	3
Wimbledon	1996–97	Premier League	29	3	7	0	2	0	—		38	3
Wimbledon	1997–98	Premier League	24	0	3	1	1	0	—		28	1
Wimbledon	Total		177	12	15	1	9	0	—		201	13
Queens Park Rangers	1997–98	First Division	7	1	0	0	0	0	—		7	1
Queens Park Rangers	1998–99	First Division	2	0	0	0	0	0	—		2	0
Queens Park Rangers	Total		9	1	0	0	0	0	—		9	1
Career total			446	36	36	3	27	0	11	2	520	41

== Honours ==
Wealdstone

- Alliance Premier League: 1984–85

IFK Holmsund

- Division 3 Mellersta Norrland: 1986

Wimbledon

- FA Cup: 1987–88

Leeds United

- Football League Second Division: 1989–90

== Filmography ==
=== Film ===
Year	Title	Role	Notes
1998	Lock, Stock and Two Smoking Barrels	Big Chris	Winner – Empire Award for Best Newcomer
2000	Gone in 60 Seconds	Sphinx	
2000	Snatch	Bullet Tooth Tony	Winner – Empire Award for Best British Actor
2001	Swordfish	Marco	
2001	Night at the Golden Eagle	Rodan	
2001	Mean Machine	Danny Meehan	
2004	The Big Bounce	Lou Harris	
2004	Tooth	The Extractor	
2004	EuroTrip	'Mad' Maynard	
2004	Survive Style 5+	Killer	
2004	Blast	Michael Kittredge	
2005	Slipstream	Winston Briggs	
2005	Submerged	Henry	Direct-to-video
2005	Hollywood Flies	Sean	
2006	The Number One Girl	Dragos Molnar	
2006	Johnny Was	Johnny Doyle	
2006	She's the Man	Coach Dinklage	
2006	The Other Half	Trainer	
2006	Played	Detective Brice	
2006	X-Men: The Last Stand	Cain Marko / Juggernaut	
2006	Garfield: A Tail of Two Kitties	Rommel	Voice role
2007	The Condemned	Ewan McStarley	
2007	7–10 Split	Roddy Nightengale	
2007	The Riddle	Mike Sullivan	
2007	Strength and Honour	'Smasher' O'Driscoll	
2007	Tooth & Nail	Mongrel	
2008	Hell Ride	Billy 'Wings'	
2008	Loaded	Mr. Black	
2008	The Midnight Meat Train	Mahogany	Nominated – Best Supporting Actor at Fangoria Chainsaw Awards; Nominated – Best Supporting Actor at Fright Meter Awards
2009	(Untitled)	Ray Barko	
2009	Year One	Sargon	
2009	Assault of Darkness	Mr. Hunter	
2009	The Heavy	Edgar Dunn	
2009	The Ballad of G.I. Joe	Destro	
2009	The Bleeding	Cain	
2010	Smokin' Aces 2: Assassins' Ball	Finbar 'The Surgeon' McTeague	Direct-to-video
2010	Locked Down	Anton Vargas	
2010	Inversion	Doug	
2011	Kill the Irishman	Keith Ritson	
2011	Age of the Dragons	Stubbs	
2011	You May Not Kiss the Bride	Brick	
2011	The Liquidator	Killer	
2011	Blood Out	Zed	Direct-to-video
2011	Cross	Gunnar	Direct-to-video
2011	Not Another Not Another Movie	Nancy Longbottom	Direct-to-video
2012	Madagascar 3: Europe's Most Wanted	Freddie 'The Dog'	Voice role
2012	Hijacked	Joe Ballard	
2012	Freelancers	Sully	
2012	The Diamond Heist	Jack Varga	
2012	Fire with Fire	Boyd	Direct-to-video
2013	Company of Heroes	Brent Willoughby	Direct-to-video
2013	Fractured	Quincy	
2013	Armed Response	Tillinghast	
2013	Escape Plan	Drake	
2013	Extraction	Ivan Rudovsky	
2013	Ambushed	Vincent Camastra	Direct-to-video
2013	Blood of Redemption	Campbell	Direct-to-video
2014	Redirected	Golden Pole	
2014	Puncture Wounds	Bennett	Direct-to-video
2014	Way of the Wicked	John Eliott	Direct-to-video
2014	Beyond Justice	Vincent De La Cruz	
2014	Reaper	Rob	
2014	Gutshot Straight	Carl	Direct-to-video
2014	The Calculator	Yust Van Borg	
2015	The Enforcer	Renner	
2015	Left to Die	Sarge	
2015	Absolution	The Boss	Direct-to-video
2015	Rivers 9	Ray Kaplan	
2015	Checkmate	Lu	
2015	6 Ways to Die	John Doe	
2015	Gridlocked	Ryker	
2015	Bite	John 'Big John'	
2016	Kill Kane	Ray Brookes	
2016	Decommissioned	Michael Price	
2016	The Midnight Man	Pearl	Direct-to-video
2017	Cross Wars	Gunnar	Direct-to-video
2019	The Gandhi Murder	Sir Norman Smith	
2019	Madness in the Method	Vinnie	
2019	Cross: Rise of the Villains	Gunnar	Direct-to-video
2020	Ron Hopper's Misfortune	Ron Hopper	
2020	I Am Vengeance: Retaliation	Sean Teague	
2020	The Big Ugly	Neelyn	Winner – Best Actor at UK Film Festival
2021	Rise of the Footsoldier: Origins	Bernard O'Mahoney	
2021	The Bezonians	Willard Greb	
2022	Bullet Proof	Temple	
2026	Reckless	Trent	Direct-to-video
2028	Viva La Madness †	TBA	Post-production
TBA	Overtown †	Cutty	Delayed
TBA	Hypnotized †	TBA	Completed
TBA	Cross 4 †	Gunnar	Post-production

=== Television ===
Year	Title	Role	Notes
1993	Gladiators	Himself	Episode: "Battle of the Gladiators"
1993	Sean's Show	Himself	Episode: "Great Socks"
2003	Top Gear	Himself	Series 2 episode 1, "Star in a Reasonably Priced Car" segment
2005	Extras	Himself	Episode: "Ross Kemp & Vinnie Jones"
2005	Mysterious Island	Bob	Television film
2010	Celebrity Big Brother UK	Himself	Housemate (series 7)
2010	Chuck	Karl Stromberg	Episode: "Chuck Versus the Three Words"
2011	The Cape	Dominic Raoul / Scales	6 episodes
2013	Elementary	Colonel Sebastian Moran	2 episodes
2014	Psych	Ronnie Ives	Episode: "Lock, Stock, Some Smoking Barrels and Burton Guster's Goblet of Fire"
2014	The Musketeers	Martin Labarge	Episode: "The Challenge"
2014	Mind Games	Isaac Vincent	2 episodes
2015	Police Interceptors	Himself	
2015–2016	Galavant	Gareth	18 episodes
2015–2018	Arrow	Danny 'Brick' Brickwell	9 episodes
2016	MacGyver	John Kendrick	Episode: "The Rising"
2018	Deception	Gunter Gastafsen	13 episodes
2019	NCIS: Los Angeles	Rick Dorsey	Episode: "A Bloody Brilliant Plan"
2020	Harry's Heroes	Himself	1 episode
2021	Law & Order: Organized Crime	Albi Briscu	8 episodes
2021	The Masked Singer Australia	Himself	Contestant (season 3); as "Volcano"
2023	Tracked	Himself	
2023–present	Vinnie Jones in the Country	Himself	18 episodes
2024–present	The Gentlemen	Geoff Seacombe	Main role; 16 episodes

=== Stage ===
Year	Title	Role	Notes
2024–2025	Only Fools and Horses The Musical	Danny Driscoll	At Hammersmith Apollo from 17 December 2024 to 5 January 2025

=== Video games ===
Year	Title	Role	Notes
2023–2024	World of Tanks	Himself	Available as a time limited, voiced tank commander in game during Holiday ops 2024

=== Music videos ===
- Westlife - "Bop Bop Baby" (2002)
  - As Duke Vincent, the vilest man in the kingdom for money. The band members serve as Musketeers who are imprisoned in a dungeon by the Duke.
- Steve Aoki & LOOPERS - "Pika Pika" (2018)
  - Originally filmed for Steve Aoki & Knife Party - "Piledriver", but the original video was unreleased and the footage was re-edited and reused

== Discography ==
=== Studio albums ===
- 2002: Respect

=== Singles ===
- "Wooly Bully" (1993)

== Awards and nominations ==
Year	Awards	Category	Work	Result	Ref.
1999	Empire Awards	Empire Award for Best Newcomer	Lock, Stock and Two Smoking Barrels	Won	
2001	Empire Awards	Empire Award for Best British Actor	Snatch	Won	
2008	Fright Meter Awards	Best Supporting Actor	The Midnight Meat Train	Nominated	
2009	Fangoria Chainsaw Awards	Best Supporting Actor	The Midnight Meat Train	Nominated	
2020	UK Film Festival	Best Actor	The Big Ugly	Won	
