= History of the FA Cup =

Aspect of footballing history

The history of the FA Cup in association football dates back to 1871–72. Aside from suspensions during the First and Second World Wars, the competition has been played every year since.

For a complete listing of FA Cup winners, see the list of FA Cup finals.

== 19th century ==
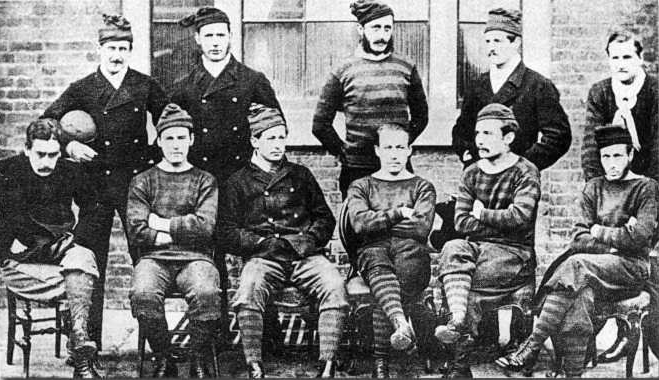
The Royal Engineers squad that played the first FA Cup final in 1872

On 20 July 1871, in the offices of The Sportsman newspaper, C. W. Alcock proposed to The Football Association committee that "it is desirable that a Challenge Cup should be established in connection with the Association for which all clubs belonging to the Association should be invited to compete". The other committee members were:

- A. Stair (F.A. Treasurer) (Upton Park)
- C.W. Stephenson (Westminster School)
- J.H. Gifford (Civil Service)
- D. Allport (Crystal Palace)
- M.P. Betts (Harrow School)
- Capt. Francis Marindin (Royal Engineers)

The proposition was carried.

The inaugural FA Cup tournament kicked off in November 1871. After thirteen games in all, Wanderers were crowned the winners in the final at Kennington Oval, on 16 March 1872. The following year, Wanderers retained the title after receiving a bye to the final, the 'Challenge Round', where they beat Oxford University to retain the Cup. The rules were changed for the following season, to help inspire teams to try to get to the final, instead of knowing who their opponents would be before they reached it.

1875 saw the first final to be replayed, between Royal Engineers and Old Etonians, on Saturday 13 March (score 1–1 after extra time, in the first drawn final) and on Tuesday 16 March (score 2-0 between the respective teams), both times at Kennington Oval.

The modern cup was beginning to be established by the 1888–89 season, when qualifying rounds were introduced, with clubs competing on regional basis until only one was left for the fourth qualifying round, and in the same season, the 'magic of the cup' began when Warwick County became the first non-league side to beat a First Division club on 6 October 1888, winning 2–1 away at Stoke.

== 20th century ==
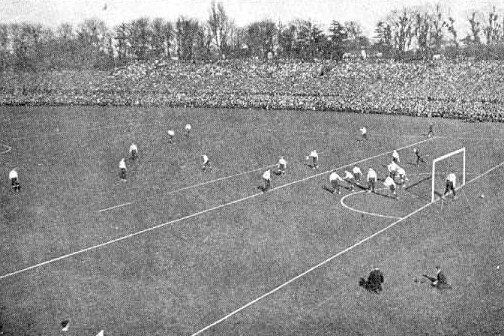
1901 FA Cup final at Crystal Palace, Sandy Brown just scored a goal

The 1901 FA Cup final was won by London club Tottenham Hotspur, which became the only non-League club to have ever won the FA Cup final after the formation of the Football League in 1888 (Tottenham were then in the Southern League). The final between Tottenham and Sheffield United held at Crystal Palace was attended by 110,820 fans, then the largest crowd ever for a football match. The game ended in a 2–2 draw, with both Spurs goals from Sandy Brown, and a disputed goal from Sheffield United – the final was the first to be filmed and it would be the first referee decision demonstrated to be wrong by film footage as it showed that the ball did not cross the line. The replay was held at Burnden Park, Bolton on 27 April 1901, which Spurs won 3–1.

In the 1915 final, Sheffield United beat Chelsea 3–0 at Old Trafford. The final became known as "The Khaki Cup Final" owing to the large number of uniformed soldiers in attendance. This year the FA Cup competition was controversial as the First World War had started, and concerns were raised about the appropriateness of football competition continuing in the midst of a world war. The Football Association however argued that it would be better to carry on to provide relief for the workers and soldiers. In the following year the competition was suspended.

The 1923 final was the first FA Cup final to be played at Wembley Stadium, which was known at the time as the Empire Stadium. Over 200,000 people squeezed into a stadium meant for 127,000 and many spilt out onto the pitch. It took three-quarter of an hour for mounted police to clear the field before the game could start. Bolton Wanderers beat West Ham 2–0 in the match.

The practice of teams from the top two divisions receiving exemption to the third round of the competition began in the 1925/26 season. The 1926 final is the first to be played under a change to the offside rule.

The 1945–1946 FA Cup was the first played since the competition was suspended during World War II. For one season only, as the intermediate Football League North and Football League South were of variable quality, to boost clubs' income each tie was played over two legs (one home, one away with the scores being added together to decide who went through) to increase the number of matches in the season. Matches that were level at the end of both legs were replayed at the stadium of whichever team had played the second leg away. The final, played at a neutral venue, remained a single match affair, decided by extra time if teams were level after 90 minutes. The final was won by Derby County 4–1.

In the 1966–67 FA Cup the first substitutes were allowed after many years of finals proving unbalanced due to injuries which forced players into leaving the field early. Players had suffered broken bones in the 1956, 1957, 1959, 1960, 1961 and 1965 finals. They were not, however, used in the final until the next year in the 1968 FA Cup final, when Dennis Clarke replaced John Kaye for West Bromwich Albion.

1970 saw the first Wembley final to go to a replay. The replayed final was played at Old Trafford due to the damaged state of the Wembley pitch caused by the Horse of the Year Show and was contested between Chelsea and Leeds United. 1970 also saw the first third-place play-off with Manchester United beating Watford 2–0. This play-off proved short-lived, and the 1973–74 competition saw the last 3rd place play-off match, contested by Leicester City and Burnley, with Burnley winning 1–0 at Filbert Street.

In 1972 the FA Cup celebrated its centenary (though this was not its 100th season, due to interruptions for the two world wars). Leeds United won the final against holders Arsenal. The 1973 FA Cup final was the 50th anniversary of Wembley as a venue for the cup final.

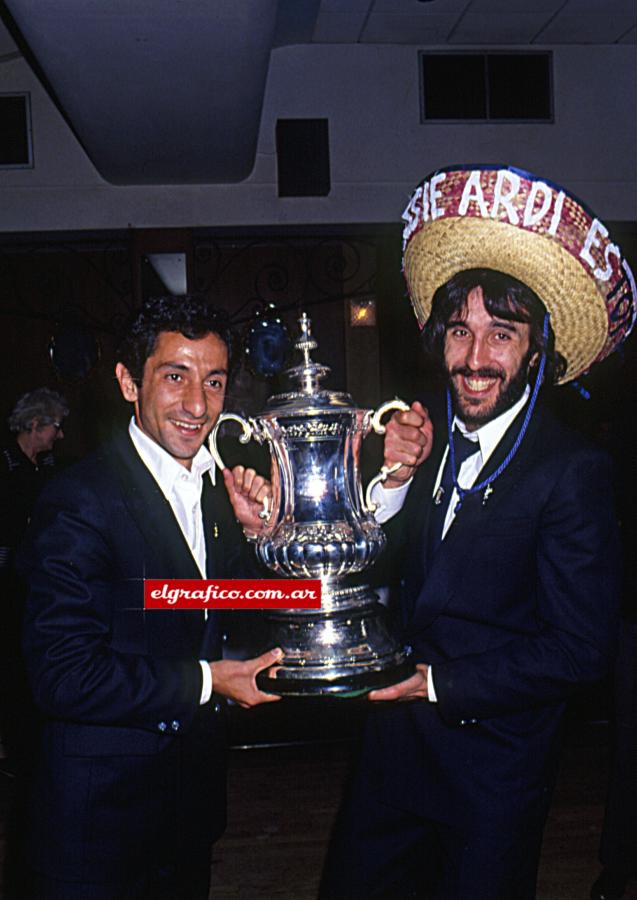
Osvaldo Ardiles and Ricardo Villa holding the FA Cup trophy won in 1981

In 1981, The 100th FA Cup final took place between Tottenham Hotspur and Manchester City. It finished 1–1 after extra time. For the first time, the replay was held again at Wembley – previously replayed finals had been held at other neutral grounds. Tottenham won 3–2.

In the 1990–91 FA Cup, the Arsenal v Leeds United fourth round tie had to be replayed three times. After the third replay, The FA decided that from the first round onwards, one replay, then extra time, then a penalty shootout would be a suitable alternative to a fixtures backlog. The semi-final of this year was the first to be played at Wembley, with Tottenham beating Arsenal 3–1, including a 30-yard free kick from Paul Gascoigne.

After the change in replay rule starting with the season 1991–92 FA Cup where multiple replays were replaced by one replay and penalty kicks after extra time, the first penalty takers in the competition proper were Rotherham United and Scunthorpe United, with Rotherham winning 7–6 in a first round replay. In the qualifying rounds, multiple replays lasted until 1996/97, with the game between Morecambe and Lancaster City on 4 November 1996 being the last second replay.

In 1993, both semi-finals were played at Wembley Stadium for the first time ever, one between Arsenal and Tottenham, the other between Sheffield Wednesday and Sheffield United. In 1993, the last ever FA Cup final replay took place, with Arsenal beating Sheffield Wednesday 2–1. Arsenal became the first team to win both the FA Cup and the League Cup in the same season, beating Sheffield Wednesday in both finals, the first time the same teams contested the two cup finals in the same season.

In 1999, the last ever FA Cup semi-final replay took place. From 2000 onwards, it was decided that any semi-finals and finals would go first to extra time then penalties, rather than be replayed. In 1999, under pressure from The FA, Manchester United became the first FA Cup holders not to defend their title when they withdrew from the FA Cup, instead electing to take part in the inaugural FIFA Club World Championship played in Brazil. To decide who took their place, a "lucky losers" draw was held containing the 20 teams knocked out in the second round; Darlington were selected.

== 21st century ==
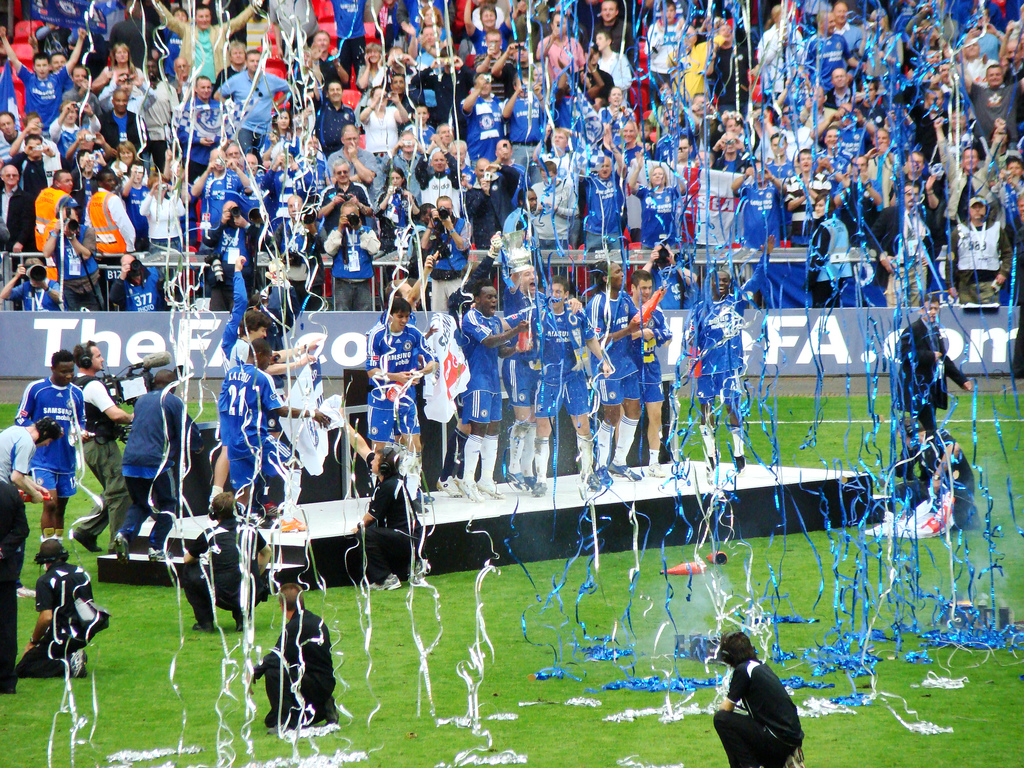
First FA Cup final at the new Wembley Stadium in 2007

Redevelopment of Wembley saw the final played outside of England for the first time ever, with the 2001–2006 finals being played at the Millennium Stadium in Cardiff.

Upon the opening of the new Wembley Stadium, the final returned to Wembley, but the semi-finals were played at neutral grounds. However, in 2003, it was announced that all future semi-finals would be played at the new Wembley Stadium once it had opened, and this took effect in 2008.

Beginning with the 2016–17 competition, all quarter-final matches were played to a result on the day (with draws followed by extra time, with a penalty shootout if level after extra time) instead of being replayed in the event of a draw.

Beginning with the 2024–25 competition, replays were scrapped from the first round onwards in attempt to reduce fixtures congestion. The decision to scrap replays was made via a consultation between the Football Association and the Premier League only. Clubs of the EFL and below were not consulted, and upon learning of the changes, a large number of clubs released statements openenly criticising the FA for their decision. Criticism also came from government officials, with the Prime Minister's deputy spokesman saying "David and Goliath fixtures are a part of the magic of the cup and we know that replays have been a welcome source of income for smaller clubs throughout the years.", and Opposition Leader Keir Starmer saying it was the "wrong decision" with replays "part of the tradition of the FA Cup".

== Broadcasting ==
The 1927 final was the first ever Cup Final to be broadcast by the BBC, who produced a numbered grid of the pitch for Radio Times readers to follow the ball. This gave rise to the popular myth of the origin of the phrase, "Back to square one" (i.e. a back-pass to the goalkeeper).

In 1938, after 29 minutes of extra time, it was still 0–0 between Preston and Huddersfield. BBC Radio commentator Thomas Woodrooffe declared: "If there's a goal scored now, I'll eat my hat." Seconds later Preston was awarded a penalty from which George Mutch scored. Woodrooffe kept his promise. This was also the first FA Cup Final to be broadcast live by BBC Television.

== Notable events ==
=== Inaugural tournament ===
The inaugural FA Cup tournament kicked off in November 1871. Four first-round matches were the first FA Cup games ever played – on 11 November 1871. The first Cup goal was scored by Clapham Rovers player Jarvis Kenrick in a 3–0 win over Upton Park (Kenrick scoring twice in the process). The following year, on 16 March 1872, Wanderers became the first winners of the FA Cup, beating Royal Engineers 1–0 at The Oval. Fifteen clubs had entered, only twelve actually played, and there were thirteen games in total. The winning goal was scored by Morton Peto Betts, who played under the pseudonym of 'A.H. Chequer'.

=== White Horse Final ===
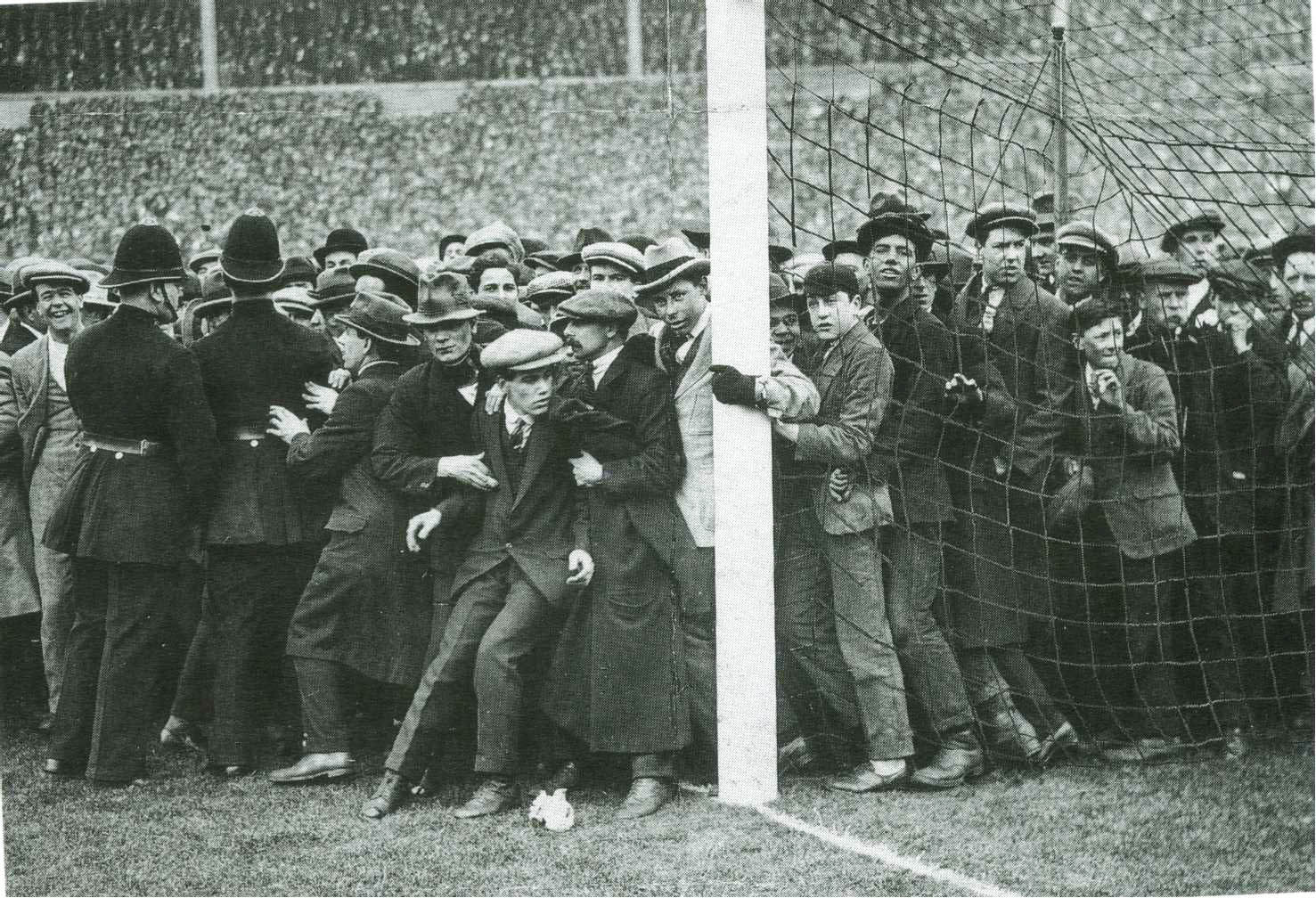
The first FA Cup Final at Wembley in 1923, the crowd at the Cup Final was so large that fans swarmed onto the pitch

The first Wembley FA Cup Final, played on 28 April 1923, was marked by disorderly scenes unparalleled in the history of football. Before the match a massive crowd outside the stadium rushed the gates, burst the barriers and swarmed on to the pitch. Kick-off was delayed for 45 minutes as mounted police, with PC George Scorey on his white charger "Billy" – hence the "White Horse Final" – particularly visible, encouraged people to move behind the touchlines. Bolton beat West Ham 2–0 and the first Wembley goal was scored after just two minutes by David Jack. It was estimated that 200,000 fans had squeezed into Wembley and Cup Finals were made "all ticket" after that.

=== Burnden Park disaster ===
During a Sixth Round second-leg tie between Bolton Wanderers and Stoke City on 9 March 1946, a human crush killed 33 spectators. Despite the disaster, the match continued, causing Stoke player Stanley Matthews to later say that he was sickened that the game was allowed to continue.

=== The Matthews Final ===
The final of 1953 is known as the Matthews Final. The match between Blackpool and Bolton Wanderers saw Stanley Matthews, at the age of 38, in his third attempt to win an FA Cup winner's medal for Blackpool. Bolton were 3–1 up with 22 minutes remaining and, despite being reduced to nine fit men through severe injury to two players, looked set to win the match when Blackpool's Stan Mortensen scored from a Matthews cross. With less than five minutes remaining Blackpool equalised from a Mortensen free kick (his hat-trick, which remains the only one ever scored in a Wembley FA Cup Final) and shortly after the restart, with everybody anticipating extra time, Matthews passed to Bill Perry who put the ball in the back of the net securing a 4–3 victory for Blackpool.

=== Bert Trautmann ===
The final of 1956 saw Manchester City win 3–1 against Birmingham City. Roughly 15 minutes before the end of the game, Man City's goalkeeper Bert Trautmann (a German who had been taken as a prisoner of war by the British in 1945) injured his neck when he made a save at the feet of Birmingham's Peter Murphy. Despite being in terrible pain he continued to play till the end of match and collected his winners' medal still clutching his neck. An X-ray later revealed that he had broken a vertebra in his neck.

=== Hillsborough disaster ===
In 1989 during the opening minutes of the FA Cup semi-final between Liverpool and Nottingham Forest, 96 people were crushed to death because of overcrowding. Liverpool went on to beat Everton 3–2 in the final. The Hillsborough inquest states fans were unlawfully killed due to the lack of police support.

=== Fabrice Muamba ===
On 17 March 2012, a Fifth Round tie between Tottenham Hotspur and Bolton Wanderers was abandoned after 41 minutes with the score at 1–1, when Bolton midfielder Fabrice Muamba suffered a cardiac arrest on the pitch. Muamba later retired from the sport following medical advice, after his heart stopped beating for 78 minutes and remained in intensive care for two weeks. Tottenham won the rearranged fixture 3–1.

=== Minnows, cup runs and giant killings ===
Blackburn Rovers are the only surviving club to have won the FA Cup three years in a row, in 1883, 1884 and 1885. This feat was also achieved first by Wanderers FC with wins in 1876, 1877 and 1878, but Wanderers were dissolved in 1887, having not reached a single final since 1878 despite that win meaning they won 5 of the first 7 FA Cup seasons.

In 1894, Notts County became the first club outside the top division to win the FA Cup: Notts County finished 3rd in Division Two that season. However, as they have not won the FA Cup since then, this means that Notts County have been waiting longer than any other winning professional club to win the trophy for a second time. Their first ever final appearance had come three years earlier in 1891, where they were defeated 3–1 by Blackburn Rovers at The Oval, despite having beaten the same side 7–1 in the league only a week earlier.

In 1901 Tottenham Hotspur became the first team from outside the Football League to win the FA Cup since the league was founded, with a 3–1 replay victory over Sheffield United.

1958 saw Leeds United beaten 2–1 at home to Cardiff City in the third round for the third consecutive year.

In 1958–59, Third Division club Norwich City had one of the great cup runs, beating Tottenham and Manchester United and holding Luton Town to a draw in the semi-final before losing the replay. Their progress from the first round proper included wins over Ilford, Swindon Town (replay), Manchester United, Cardiff City, Tottenham Hotspur, Sheffield United (replay).

When Sunderland beat Leeds United 1–0 in the 1973 FA Cup final, Sunderland were the first Cup winners from outside the top flight since West Bromwich Albion in 1931. The feat was repeated twice over the next seven seasons (by Southampton in 1976 and West Ham United in 1980) but has not been accomplished since.

In 1980, West Ham United became the last side to date to win the competition from outside the top division in football. They were a Second Division outfit when they beat holders Arsenal 1–0 thanks to a goal by Trevor Brooking. Four second-level clubs – Queens Park Rangers in 1982, Sunderland in 1992, Millwall in 2004 and Cardiff City in 2008 – have since reached the final, though all four lost.

In 1984, Johnny Hore's Plymouth Argyle side narrowly missed out on being the first Third Division side to reach the final. In a tense semi-final at Villa Park, Watford came out on top, 1–0 victors. Starting in the first round proper, Argyle had beaten Southend United (in a replay), Barking, Newport County (in a replay), Darlington, West Bromwich Albion and Derby County (in a replay).

In 1989, Sutton United beat Coventry City 2–1 at Gander Green Lane. Sutton United were in the Conference at the time, whilst Coventry were in the First Division, and had won the cup 18 months earlier. This was the last occasion that a non-League club beat a top division club in the FA Cup until Luton Town defeated Norwich City in the 4th round in 2012–13 season.

On 11 December 2007 Chasetown became the lowest-ranked team ever to reach the FA Cup third round. The Southern League Division One Midlands side stunned League One Port Vale as Danny Smith's last-minute goal sealed a 1–0 win after Port Vale missed two penalties. There was a five-division gap between the two teams.

Premier League side Norwich City lost at home to non-League Luton Town in the 2012–13 FA Cup competition. This was the first time a non-league side had defeated top flight opposition since 1989, and the first time that a non-League side had won away at a top flight side since Altrincham had won at Birmingham City in 1985–86.

The 2016–17 FA Cup had two non-League teams reaching the fifth round; Lincoln City and Sutton United, both of the National League. Sutton United's run included a 3–1 win away to League One side AFC Wimbledon in a third round replay and a 1–0 win at home to Leeds United of the Championship in the fourth round, before succumbing 2–0 to eventual winners Arsenal in the fifth round. Lincoln City became the first non-League side in 103 years to reach the quarter-final stage of the FA Cup, since Queens Park Rangers F.C. of the Southern Football League in 1913–14, and the first outright since the non-League became part of the English football league system in 1920–21, as opposed to running parallel to the League. Their run included a 3–2 victory over League One Oldham Athletic in the second round, two Championship scalps in rounds three and four — a 1–0 replay win against Ipswich Town and 3–1 against Brighton & Hove Albion, respectively — before a 1–0 win away to Burnley of the Premier League in the fifth round. Lincoln City were eventually knocked out in the quarter-finals, a 5–0 reversal at Arsenal.

In the 2025–26 FA Cup, sixth-tier National League North side Macclesfield defeated first-tier Premier League side and FA Cup holders Crystal Palace 2–1. Widely regarded as the biggest upset in the history of the competition, there was a league placing difference of 117 places between the two sides, dethroning Chasetown vs Port Vale, in the 2007–08 FA Cup second round replay (108 places). This was the first time since the formation of the Premier League that a Level 6 side had defeated a side from the top division. This also made Crystal Palace the first defending champions to lose against a non-league team since Wolverhampton Wanderers lost against Crystal Palace in 1909, back when the Southern Football League ran parallel to the Football League as opposed to being a feeder to it in the modern day.

=== Come-backs ===
In 1966, Everton became only the second side ever to win the cup after being two goals down, without the need of extra time. The Merseysiders had gone two goals down with thirty-one minutes remaining before coming back to win 3–2, emulating Blackpool's achievement of thirteen years earlier, however, while Blackpool had been up against a Bolton side reduced to nine fit men, Sheffield Wednesday, by contrast, were in no way handicapped. The match, however, was largely forgotten as it was overshadowed by England's World Cup victory later that year.

== Records and statistics ==
=== Individual records ===
==== Most wins and final appearances ====
The record for most FA Cup wins by a player is held by Ashley Cole, who has won it seven times (with Arsenal in 2002, 2003 and 2005, and Chelsea in 2007, 2009, 2010 and 2012). With Chelsea's victory over Portsmouth in the 2010 final, Cole beat the record of five jointly held by Charles Wollaston (Wanderers), Arthur Kinnaird (Wanderers and Old Etonians) and Jimmy Forrest (Blackburn Rovers).

Cole has appeared in 8 finals, having also been on the losing side for Arsenal in 2001. The record for appearing in finals is 9, held by Arthur Kinnaird.

The record for most FA Cup wins by a manager is held by Arsène Wenger, who won it seven times (with Arsenal in 1998, 2002, 2003, 2005, 2014, 2015 and 2017).

==== Most goals ====
Notts County's Harry Cursham has scored the most goals in the FA Cup, with 49 goals in 44 appearances from 1877 to 1891. Cursham has held the record continuously since 1887. The closest anyone has come to breaking this long-standing record was Ian Rush, who scored 44 FA Cup goals in his career, from 1979 to 1998.

W. "Doc" Dowden scored 19 FA Cup goals for Wimbledon in the 1929/30 season. This is believed to be the record for one individual in a season. For rounds proper only, the highest total is that of Jimmy Ross who scored 18 times for Preston North End in 1887/88.

When Peter Osgood scored for Chelsea in the 1970 final, he became the last player to date (and ninth in total) to score in every round of the cup.

In one tie, between Bournemouth & Boscombe Athletic vs. Margate, Ted MacDougall scored 9 of Bournemouth's goals in their 11–0 victory.

==== Scoring firsts ====
In 1876, Thomas Hughes was the first to score more than once in the final, in a replay match in which Wanderers defeated Old Etonians 3–0. In the same final, Alexander Bonsor from the losing side became the first to score in two consecutive finals (both of which his team lost).

Eddie Kelly from Arsenal became the first substitute to score when he came on the pitch in the 70th minute of the 1971 final and scored in the 96th. Stuart McCall from Everton scored two goals after coming in from the bench in the 1989 final in the 90th and 102nd minutes.

In 2001, Dagenham & Redbridge F.C. goalkeeper Tony Roberts became the first goalkeeper in the history of the tournament to score a goal, this happened in a Fourth round qualifying game against Basingstoke Town.

==== Scoring streaks ====
In 1886, Jimmy Brown of Blackburn Rovers became the first to score in three consecutive finals from 1884 to 1886 (winning all three).

In 1887, Aston Villa legend Archie Hunter became the first player to score in every round of the FA Cup in Villa's victorious 1887 campaign (beginning from the second round, as Villa had a bye in the first). This feat was bettered in 1901 by Sandy Brown of Tottenham Hotspur, who scored in all rounds from the first.

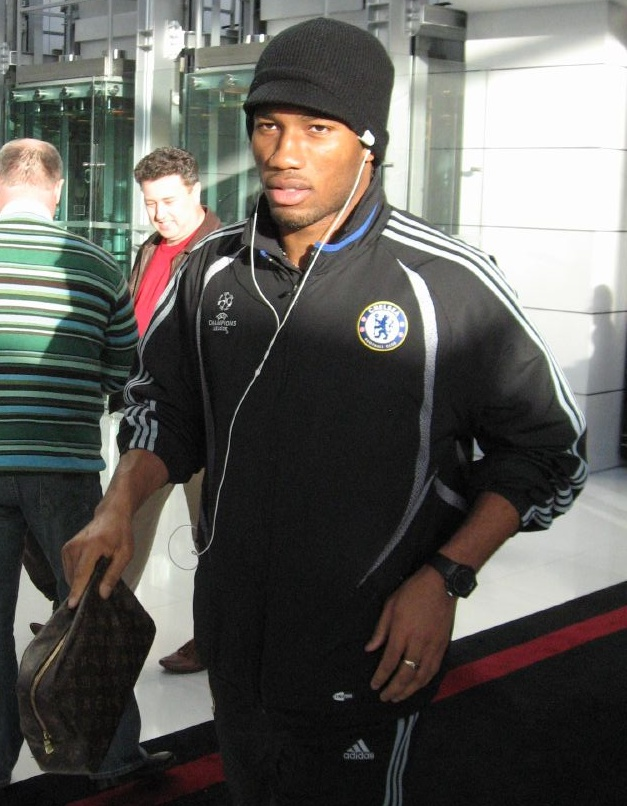
In 2012, Didier Drogba of Chelsea became the first player to score in four FA Cup Finals

In the 2012 final, Didier Drogba became the first player to score in four FA Cup Finals.

==== Fastest goals ====
Aston Villa's Bob Chatt scored the winner in the 1895 FA Cup final with the then-fastest goal after just 30 seconds; his record stood until broken by Louis Saha in 2009, who scored in 25 seconds.

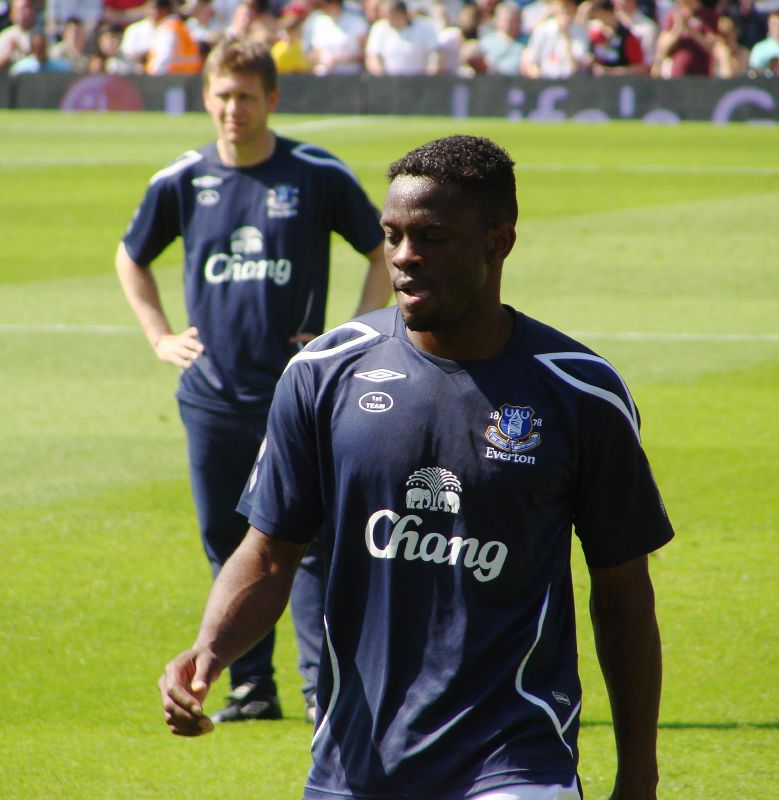
Louis Saha of Everton scored in a record 25 seconds in the 2009 FA Cup final

On 13 February 2010, Jimmy Kebe of Reading scored the fastest goal in the FA Cup proper after just 9 seconds of Reading's Fifth Round tie against West Bromwich Albion.

On 3 June 2023, İlkay Gündoğan of Manchester City scored after just 13 seconds at Wembley Stadium, during the F.A. Cup Final, playing against Manchester United.

==== Hat–tricks ====
William Townley scored the first hat–trick in an FA Cup final for Blackburn Rovers when they beat Sheffield Wednesday 6–1 in 1890.

In 1894, Jimmy Logan became the second player to score three goals in the final of the competition, with his Notts County beating Bolton Wanderers 4–1.

The third hat-trick in an FA Cup final was scored by Stan Mortensen for Blackpool against Bolton Wanderers in the 1953 FA Cup final. Blackpool won 4–3.

In 1922, England amateur international Wilfred Minter created an unusual scoring record. In an era when there was some dispute whether or not a hat–trick had to be scored as consecutive goals, Minter performed the feat twice in one match, as well as scoring a seventh, as he scored all of St Albans City's goals against Dulwich Hamlet. Despite his feat, they actually lost the game 8–7.

==== Penalties ====
The first penalty in the final was not converted until 1910, with Albert Shepherd scoring from the spot in the Newcastle 2–0 Barnsley replay. The first missed penalty occurred in 1913, with Charlie Wallace from Aston Villa being the unlucky player, although Villa did win 1–0 over Sunderland. Two penalties were not converted until 1994, when Eric Cantona kicked from the spot in the 60th and 66th minutes to contribute to Manchester United's 4–0 win over Chelsea.

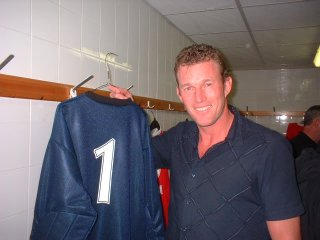
Dave Beasant of Wimbledon was the first goalkeeper to save a penalty in an FA Cup Final at Wembley, in 1988

In 1988, Wimbledon's Dave Beasant became the first goalkeeper to save a penalty in an FA Cup final at Wembley, when he denied John Aldridge of Liverpool (although Charlie Wallace of Aston Villa was the first to miss a penalty in the final). Wimbledon defeated the league champions Liverpool 1–0 in that game, and so Beasant also became the first goalkeeper to captain an FA Cup-winning side.

==== Own goals ====
In 1877, Lord Kinnaird scored the first own goal in the final with Wanderers defeating Oxford University 2–1.

In the 1946 final, Bert Turner from Charlton Athletic became famous for scoring for both sides – first he put a goal in his own net, only to equalise from a free kick a minute later. Tommy Hutchison would repeat the feat (in reverse) for Manchester City in 1981, as did Gary Mabbutt of Tottenham Hotspur in 1987.

==== Age records ====
Billy Hampson of Newcastle United, the oldest FA Cup finalist, was 41 years and 257 days old when his side beat Aston Villa 2–0 in the 1924 Final.

In 1983, Norman Whiteside, at 18 years and 18 days, became the youngest player ever to score in an FA Cup final, whilst playing for Manchester United against Brighton & Hove Albion. As of 2024 this record remains unbroken.

On 6 August 2022, Finn Smith scored for Newport (IOW) in their 1–3 victory over Fleet Town aged 16 years and 01 days to become the youngest ever goal scorer in the competition.

In 2004, Curtis Weston of Millwall became the youngest ever player to play in the final at the age of 17 years and 119 days, beating the record of James F. M. Prinsep of Clapham Rovers set in the 1879 final.

==== Disciplinary firsts ====
In 1985, Kevin Moran of Manchester United became the first player to be sent off in an FA Cup Final, he had fouled Peter Reid with a sliding tackle which missed the ball. United went on to win the match 1–0, after extra time. Since then, only five other players have been sent off in the FA Cup Final: José Antonio Reyes for Arsenal in 2005, Pablo Zabaleta for Manchester City in 2013, Chris Smalling of Manchester United in 2016, Victor Moses in 2017 and Mateo Kovačić in 2020, both of Chelsea. Of these, only Moran received a straight red and Zabaleta, Moses and Kovačić ended up being on the losing side.

==== Accident firsts ====
At the first Final in 1872, Edmund Cresswell broke his collarbone in a charge for Royal Engineers against Wanderers ten minutes into the match, but insisted on continuing play, in goal for the duration of the match, "although completely disabled and in severe pain", according to The Sportsman's report.

Liverpool left back Gerry Byrne suffered an identical injury during the 1965 FA Cup final against Leeds United. Byrne, who had a reputation for being physically tough, broke his collarbone as early as the 3rd minute. Despite being in agony, he played on for the next 87 minutes, and also an additional half hour of extra time. Despite the crippling injury he achieved legendary status, by not only helping Liverpool to win the cup for the first time in their history, following a 2–1 victory, but he also managed to provide an assist, breaking forward on the left and crossing for Roger Hunt to score the opening goal.

The first injured player forced to retire from the game was Cuthbert Ottaway when playing for Oxford University while captaining it in the second Final in 1873; his team carried on playing without him until about 80 minutes into the match when he returned to play, although Oxford ultimately lost.

The first injured player forced to retire from a match for its duration was Arthur Dunn (Old Etonians), who injured a knee 15 minutes into the second half against Blackburn Olympic in 1883. His team carried on playing with ten men but lost.

==== Nationality firsts ====
In 1872, Edward Ernest Bowen of Ireland became the first non-Englishman to win the FA Cup. In 1873, American Julian Sturgis was the first man from outside the United Kingdom of Great Britain and Ireland to win the Cup.

In 1881 Canadian born Edward Hagarty Parry was captain (and goal-scorer) of the Old Carthusians team which won the FA Cup Final defeating Old Etonians 3–0. He was the first overseas-born captain of an FA Cup winning team,[4] and the last until Irishman Johnny Carey with Manchester United in 1948. In 1997, Ruud Gullit became the first overseas manager to win the FA Cup, as his Chelsea side beat Middlesbrough 2–0. Roberto Di Matteo scored what was then the fastest goal in a Wembley cup final, after 42 seconds.

==== Other individual firsts ====
In the 1946 final, Arthur Turner, of Charlton Athletic, became the only player to play in the final who never played a League game for his club since the Football League's inception.

The 2003 Final was the first in which a goalkeeper was substituted. Paul Jones replaced the injured Southampton goalkeeper Antti Niemi.

In the 2012 final, John Terry became the first player to captain the same team to four FA Cup victories.

=== Team records ===
==== Most goals ====
The record for most goals in the FA Cup is owned by Kettering Town, having scored 935 goals.

Preston North End scored 56 goals in eight games in 1887/88, including the highest match score of 26-0 versus Hyde.

==== Winning streaks ====
After winning the competition from 1884 to 1886, Blackburn Rovers became the second club to win three consecutive FA Cups and remain the only club still in existence to win "three in a row" to this day, as Wanderers, who achieved the feat 6 years earlier, were disbanded in 1883.

Portsmouth hold the record for holding the FA Cup the longest, but only by virtue of the suspension of the competition for World War II.

==== Undefeated streaks ====
In 2013, Chelsea set a record of 29 FA Cup matches without defeat (excluding penalty shoot-outs). Their loss to Manchester City in the 2013 semi-finals was their first since a quarter-final loss to Barnsley in 2008.

Arsenal are currently the holders of the most FA Cup trophies (14).

==== Most final losses ====
Queen's Park, Birmingham City and Watford have each lost two Finals without ever winning the trophy; no other team has made it to the final more than twice but not won a single title. However, 25 other teams have lost as many or more Finals but have also won the Cup at least once. The record number of Final defeats stands at nine each for Manchester United and Chelsea (after the latter's 2025–26 defeat by Manchester City). Everton have lost eight finals.

=== Game records ===
In 1903 Bury defeated Derby County 6–0 in that year's final, a record that was matched by Manchester City in the 2019 Final, when they defeated Watford 6–0.

In 1959, Nottingham Forest became the first team to lose a player to injury in the final and go on to win with 10 men, beating Luton Town 2–1 after having goalscorer Roy Dwight carried off with a broken leg after 33 minutes.

1971 saw the longest tie in Cup history. Oxford City and Alvechurch played 6 games for a total of 660 minutes. Alvechurch won the final game 1–0 to progress to the first round proper.

==== Tournament game streaks ====
In 1963, Manchester United became the quickest winners of all time, apart from the special circumstances of 1873. They played their first match on 4 March, after 12 postponements, and won the final on 25 May, 82 days later.

The 1973–74 competition saw the record set for the highest number of games played in one season by one club. Bideford played 13 games over five rounds: one for the 1st qualifying round, two for the 2nd qualifying round, five for the 3rd qualifying round, four for the 4th qualifying round, and one for the 1st round proper. Multiple replays no longer take place, so this record is unlikely to be beaten.

=== Competition records ===
1910 saw the start of a string of 14 consecutive finals (including 3 replays, thus 17 matches) in which the losing side failed to score. This series was not approached until 1994–2000, with seven consecutive finals (no replays).

In 1948, Manchester United became the only team to win the FA Cup after being drawn against top-division opposition in every round.

1956–57 saw the record for highest number of rounds played in a row, when former League club New Brighton played in nine rounds. They started in the preliminary round, and progressed through four qualifying rounds to the fourth round proper, where they lost to Burnley. They had just one replay – for their first round tie. The 1977–78 competition saw this record equalled by Blyth Spartans, who progressed from the 1st qualifying round to the 5th round proper. The games for the 2nd qualifying round and the 5th rounds proper went to a replay. The 1979–80 competition saw the record equalled again, this time by Harlow Town, who progressed from the preliminary round through four qualifying rounds to the fourth round proper, where they lost to Watford. The matches for the 2nd and 3rd rounds went to a replay.

In 1959, Nottingham Forest fielded the same 11 players in every round of the competition (9 matches including replays).

1976–77 was the season with the largest number of matches (173) in the competition proper. Due to the abolition of multiple replays, the record is unlikely to be beaten. In seasons after 1996 (when penalty shootouts were introduced) the most ties (163) occurred in 2008–09.

A record 763 clubs were accepted for the 2011–12 FA Cup.

=== Penalty shoot-outs ===
In the 1971–72 competition, Birmingham City became the first team to win a match in a penalty shoot-out, beating Stoke City 4–3 after a 0–0 draw in the third-fourth play-off.

The 2005 FA Cup final between Arsenal and Manchester United was the first final to go to penalties, following a 0–0 draw after extra time. Arsenal won the shoot-out, and thus the Cup, with a 5–4 shoot-out victory. It was the first goalless draw in an FA Cup final since 1912.

On 22 January 2008, Swindon Town became the first club to miss all four of their penalties in an FA Cup penalty shoot-out, against Barnet in a third round replay.

=== Doubles/Trebles ===
In 1889, Preston North End became the first club to achieve the double of winning the FA Cup (beating Wolverhampton Wanderers 3–0) and the Football League in the same season. This double was extraordinary as that league was won without a single defeat, a feat which would not be repeated in the top division until 2003–04, by Arsenal. Equally impressive was that the cup was won without conceding a single goal. Such was the team's dominance that it was nicknamed "The Invincibles".

In 1897, Aston Villa won the FA Cup and the Football League on the same day, with results in League matches confirming their championship as they beat Everton 3–2 in the final.

In 1927, Cardiff City won the Welsh Cup in the same season of their FA Cup triumph, becoming the only team in the world to achieve a double of two national cups.

1961 saw Tottenham Hotspur became the first club in the 20th century to win the FA Cup and league championship in the same season, known famously as The Double. They also retained the FA Cup the following year.

In 1986, Liverpool beat Everton 3–1 in the first all-Merseyside FA Cup final to complete the double and claim their first FA Cup triumph for 12 years. The teams would meet again in the final just 3 years later.

In 1993, Arsenal were the first team to win the cup double, after beating Sheffield Wednesday in a replay. They also beat the same opposition in that season's League Cup Final, the first time that both domestic cup finals consisted of the same two teams.

In 1994, Manchester United completed the double thanks to a 4–0 win over Chelsea at Wembley. Eric Cantona scored two penalties and the other goals came from Mark Hughes and Brian McClair.

In 1996, a late goal from Eric Cantona saw Manchester United become the first team to win the double twice as they beat Liverpool 1–0 at Wembley, a week after clinching the league title and overtake Tottenham's total of eight cup wins.

In 1998, Arsenal beat Newcastle 2–0. This was the second time Arsenal had done the domestic double, which includes winning the Premier League and FA Cup in the same year.

In 1999, Manchester United completed The Treble by also winning the FA Premier League and the UEFA Champions League.

In 2002, Arsenal matched Manchester United's record of three doubles as they defeated Chelsea 2–0 at the Millennium Stadium and clinched the league title four days later.

In May 2010, Chelsea became the seventh club to complete the league and FA Cup "Double", by beating Portsmouth 1–0 in the 2010 final.

In 2019, Manchester City became the first English side to win the domestic treble with their Cup win, having already secured the EFL Cup and the Premier League.

== Oddities ==
In 1873, Sheffield confirmed a unique place in FA Cup history, knocking out Shropshire Wanderers on the toss of a coin; the only time a tie has been decided in this way.

In 1887/88, Preston North End reached the Fifth Round before playing their Second Round tie versus Bolton Wanderers. They defeated Everton in the Second Round and Halliwell in the Third before received a bye to the Fifth Round. Bolton Wanderers were reinstated after losing to Everton in the First Round and PNE were ordered to play Bolton in a Second Round tie. PNE won 9-1, the win over Halliwell stood and they progressed to their first FA Cup final.

The only game to be played on Christmas Day took place in 1888, Linfield Athletic beating Cliftonville 7–0.

In 1921, Birmingham set the record for shortest FA Cup run – they forgot to send in their entry form.

In 1931, West Bromwich Albion became the only team to win the FA Cup and get promoted in the same season, defeating Birmingham City 2–1 in the final.

in 1946, Charlton Athletic became the first team to reach the final despite losing a match in their cup run, due to the one-off two-legged format for that season following on from World War II.

For the first time, the FA Cup was played under a roof in the final of the 2002–03 season, held on 17 May 2003 at the Millennium Stadium in Cardiff, with Arsenal and Southampton benefiting from cover from the rain. Arsenal were 1–0 winners.

Wigan Athletic became the first side to win the FA Cup and be relegated in the same season, after beating Manchester City 1–0 in the 2013 final. Their fate in the Premier League was sealed three days after their triumph, following a 4–1 defeat to Arsenal.

== Participants ==
=== Amateur, university and professional teams ===
In 1883 Blackburn Olympic broke the "old order of things" to defeat Old Etonians in the final to become the first professional club to win the trophy. The win marked a turning point in the culture of the game in England.

In 2002, Team Bath (from the University of Bath) became the first university team to enter the competition since Gonville & Caius in 1881, and progressed through the qualifying rounds before being knocked out in the first round proper by Mansfield Town.

=== Scottish sides ===
In 1884 and 1885 Scottish side Queen's Park reached the final, the first time a non-English side had done so. They lost both times. (Scotland had had its own Scottish Cup since 1873.) (See also: Scottish clubs in the FA Cup)

=== Welsh sides ===
In 1914 Swansea Town became the first club from South Wales to reach the second round. They were beaten 2–1 by QPR.

The 1927 final resulted in a Cardiff City victory over Arsenal. To the present day, Cardiff City are the only non-English-based team to win the trophy.

=== Non-English and all-English teams ===
Apart from Queen's Park in 1884 and again in 1885, all of whose players were Scottish, only once has a Cup Final team had no English players at all: Liverpool won the cup in 1986 with 11 non-English players. Their only English player was an unused sub. The last team to play a final with only English players was Crystal Palace who in 1990 played both the final and the replay, which they lost, with 13 English players including the two subs. The last winners of the final with an all-English team were West Ham in 1975. No Cup Final has ever featured two all-English teams.

== Traditions ==
=== Ribbons ===
In 1901, Tottenham became the first team to attach ribbons in their team colours to the trophy, a tradition that continues to this day. Years later, the BBC covered the final and asked viewers the question 'what is taken to the FA Cup final but never used?' The answer was of course the ribbons for the losing finalists.

=== "Abide with Me" hymn ===
Aston Villa chairman Frederick Rinder in his capacity with the FA, was responsible for the innovation of singing the hymn "Abide with Me" at the 1927 FA Cup final. It has been a traditional feature of cup finals ever since.

=== Equipment ===
In the 1933 final, Everton players wore shirts numbered 1–11, and Manchester City players 12–22. This was the first major final to have the players' shirts numbered. They became standardised from the 1939 final. The initial 1993 final tie between Arsenal and Sheffield Wednesday was the first match in the competition to feature persistent squad numbers and player names on the shirts.

The 1973 FA Cup final was the first that a yellow ball was used in a Cup Final (although an orange ball had been used in previous finals, for example in 1968). An orange ball was used in the 2014 and 2015 Cup finals, as they were used throughout the competition.

=== Royal attendance ===
In 1914, George V became the first monarch to watch the FA Cup Final, between Burnley and Liverpool in the last cup final played at Crystal Palace.

The 'Matthews Final' of 1953 was the first football match attended by Elizabeth II, in her Coronation year.

=== Triangular corner flags ===
It is commonly held that previous winners of the FA Cup are traditionally the only clubs allowed to use triangular corner flags in English football. However, this tradition is not affirmed in the FA's lawbook.

== Greatest goals ==
The fastest goal was scored by Jimmy Kébé in 2010 between Reading and West Bromwich Albion with just 9 seconds on the clock.

The fastest goal in a final was scored by İlkay Gündoğan in the 2023 FA Cup final between Manchester City and Manchester United with just 12 seconds on the clock.

The 1981 final contained what many consider to be the greatest ever final goal, scored by Tottenham's Ricky Villa who beat several players in a mazy run before slotting the ball home.

In 1999, Ryan Giggs of Manchester United scored in extra time to defeat Arsenal 2–1 in FA Cup semi-final replay. The goal was voted the greatest in FA Cup history in 2003.
