= Brian Hill (referee) =

English football referee

- Born: 29 April 1947 (age 79); Wellingborough, Northamptonshire, England
- Other occupation: Accountant

Domestic
Years	League	Role
1975-1978	Football League	Assistant referee
1977-1978	(Supplementary List)	Referee
1978-1992	Football League	Referee
1992-1995	Premier League	Referee

International
Years	League	Role
1985-1994	FIFA listed	Referee

Brian Hill (born 29 April 1947) is an English former football referee in the English Football League, Premier League and at FIFA level. For most of his career, he was based in Northamptonshire, initially Wellingborough, then Kettering, finally moving to the Leicestershire town of Market Harborough. Outside football he worked as an accountant.

== Career ==
In 1988 came his greatest honour as he took charge of the FA Cup Final between Wimbledon and Liverpool.

Preceded by Neil Midgley	FA Cup Final Referee; 1988	Succeeded by Joe Worrall
