= 1987–88 FA Cup =

Tournament details
- Country: England; Wales

Final positions
- Champions: Wimbledon (1st title)
- Runners-up: Liverpool

Tournament statistics
- Top goal scorer: Graeme Sharp (6 goals)

The 1987–88 FA Cup was the 107th season of the world's oldest knockout football competition, the Football Association Challenge Cup, or FA Cup for short. The competition was won by Wimbledon who defeated league champions Liverpool 1–0 following a headed goal by Lawrie Sanchez, thus denying Liverpool the double. This was Wimbledon's only FA Cup title during its lifetime.

== Qualifying rounds ==
Most participating clubs that were not members of the Football League competed in the qualifying rounds to secure one of 28 places available in the first round.

The winners from the fourth qualifying round were Bishop Auckland, Macclesfield Town, Colwyn Bay, Runcorn, Chorley, Lincoln City, Northwich Victoria, Billingham Synthonia, Atherstone United, Welling United, Chelmsford City, Dagenham, VS Rugby, Barnet, Aylesbury United, Hayes, Worcester City, Halesowen Town, Tamworth, Sutton United, Carshalton Athletic, Bath City, Merthyr Tydfil, Farnborough Town, Bognor Regis Town, Yeovil Town, Maidstone United and Cheltenham Town.

Appearing in the competition proper for the first time were Colwyn Bay and Atherstone United. Of the others, Merthyr Tydfil had last featured at this stage in 1979–80, Cheltenham Town had last done so in 1974–75, Hayes had last done so in 1973–74, Tamworth in 1970–71 and Billingham Synthonia in 1957–58.

Macclesfield Town, Sutton United and Yeovil Town each played nine matches across seven rounds of this tournament, progressing from the first qualifying round to the third round proper. Yeovil Town did this from the Isthmian League at Step 6 of English football, while Macclesfield Town and Sutton United were from the Football Conference at Step 5. Sutton United also managed to push Middlesbrough to extra time in a replay (at Ayresome Park) before being knocked out of the competition.

== First round proper ==
The 48 teams from the Football League Third and Fourth Divisions entered in this round along with the 28 non-league clubs from the qualifying rounds and Kidderminster Harriers, Burton Albion, Altrincham and Telford United who were given byes. The first round of games were played over the weekend 14–15 November 1987, with the exception of the Welling United–Carshalton Athletic game. Replays were played in the midweek fixtures on 16–17 November. All other replays were played on 28 November.

This round included four clubs from the various competitions at Step 8 of the English football pyramid: Bishop Auckland and Billingham Synthonia from the Northern League, Colwyn Bay from the North West Counties League and Tamworth from the West Midlands (Regional) League.

Tie no	Home team	Score	Away team	Date
1	Chester City	0–1	Runcorn (5)	14 November 1987
2	Barnet (5)	0–1	Hereford United	14 November 1987
3	Bristol City	1–0	Aylesbury United (6)	14 November 1987
4	Burnley	0–1	Bolton Wanderers	14 November 1987
5	Preston North End	1–1	Mansfield Town	14 November 1987
Replay	Mansfield Town	4–2	Preston North End	17 November 1987
6	Rochdale	0–2	Wrexham	14 November 1987
7	Sutton United (5)	3–0	Aldershot	14 November 1987
8	Gillingham	2–1	Fulham	14 November 1987
9	Notts County	3–3	Chesterfield	15 November 1987
Replay	Chesterfield	0–1	Notts County	17 November 1987
10	Northwich Victoria (5)	1–0	Colwyn Bay (8)	14 November 1987
11	Macclesfield Town (5)	4–2	Carlisle United	14 November 1987
12	Wolverhampton Wanderers	5–1	Cheltenham Town (5)	14 November 1987
13	Sunderland	2–0	Darlington	14 November 1987
14	Lincoln City (5)	2–1	Crewe Alexandra	14 November 1987
15	Scarborough	1–2	Grimsby Town	14 November 1987
16	Doncaster Rovers	1–1	Rotherham United	14 November 1987
Replay	Rotherham United	2–0	Doncaster Rovers	17 November 1987
17	Bishop Auckland (8)	1–4	Blackpool	14 November 1987
18	Tranmere Rovers	2–2	Port Vale	14 November 1987
Replay	Port Vale	3–1	Tranmere Rovers	16 November 1987
19	Chorley (6)	0–2	Hartlepool United	14 November 1987
20	Brentford	0–2	Brighton & Hove Albion	14 November 1987
21	Bristol Rovers	6–0	Merthyr Tydfil (7)	14 November 1987
22	Northampton Town	2–1	Newport County	14 November 1987
23	Worcester City (6)	1–1	Yeovil Town (6)	14 November 1987
Replay	Yeovil Town	1–0	Worcester City	17 November 1987
24	Altrincham (5)	0–2	Wigan Athletic	14 November 1987
25	Southend United	0–0	Walsall	14 November 1987
Replay	Walsall	2–1	Southend United	17 November 1987
26	Bognor Regis Town (6)	0–3	Torquay United	14 November 1987
27	Scunthorpe United	3–1	Bury	14 November 1987
28	Halesowen Town (7)	2–2	Kidderminster Harriers (5)	14 November 1987
Replay	Kidderminster Harriers	4–0	Halesowen Town	16 November 1987
29	York City	0–0	Burton Albion (6)	14 November 1987
Replay	Burton Albion	1–2	York City	17 November 1987
30	Hayes (6)	0–1	Swansea City	14 November 1987
31	Billingham Synthonia (8)	2–4	Halifax Town	14 November 1987
32	Peterborough United	2–1	Cardiff City	14 November 1987
33	Colchester United	3–0	Tamworth (8)	14 November 1987
34	Chelmsford City (6)	1–2	Bath City (5)	14 November 1987
35	Leyton Orient	2–0	Exeter City	14 November 1987
36	Dagenham (5)	0–2	Maidstone United (5)	14 November 1987
37	Cambridge United	2–1	Farnborough Town (6)	14 November 1987
38	Telford United (5)	1–1	Stockport County	14 November 1987
Replay	Stockport County	2–0	Telford United	17 November 1987
39	VS Rugby (6)	0–0	Atherstone United (7)	14 November 1987
Replay	Atherstone United	0–2	VS Rugby	17 November 1987
40	Welling United (5)	3–2	Carshalton Athletic (6)	23 November 1987

== Second round proper ==
The second round of games were played over 5–6 December 1987, with replays being played at various dates afterwards (no replay was played on the same night as another). Step 6 sides Yeovil Town, from the Isthmian League Premier Division, and VS Rugby, from the Southern League Premier Division, were the lowest-ranked teams in the draw.

Tie no	Home team	Score	Away team	Date
1	Bristol City	0–1	Torquay United	5 December 1987
2	Gillingham	2–1	Walsall	5 December 1987
3	Grimsby Town	0–0	Halifax Town	5 December 1987
Replay	Halifax Town	2–0	Grimsby Town	8 December 1987
4	Northwich Victoria (5)	0–2	Blackpool	6 December 1987
5	Macclesfield Town (5)	4–0	Rotherham United	6 December 1987
6	Wrexham	1–2	Bolton Wanderers	5 December 1987
7	Maidstone United (5)	1–1	Kidderminster Harriers (5)	5 December 1987
Replay	Kidderminster Harriers	2–2	Maidstone United	7 December 1987
Replay	Kidderminster Harriers	0–0	Maidstone United	14 December 1987
Replay	Maidstone United	2–1	Kidderminster Harriers	16 December 1987
8	Northampton Town	1–2	Brighton & Hove Albion	5 December 1987
9	Scunthorpe United	2–1	Sunderland	5 December 1987
10	Mansfield Town	4–3	Lincoln City (5)	5 December 1987
11	Port Vale	2–0	Notts County	5 December 1987
12	Runcorn (5)	0–1	Stockport County	5 December 1987
13	York City	1–1	Hartlepool United	5 December 1987
Replay	Hartlepool United	3–1	York City	9 December 1987
14	Wigan Athletic	1–3	Wolverhampton Wanderers	5 December 1987
15	Peterborough United	1–3	Sutton United (5)	5 December 1987
16	Colchester United	3–2	Hereford United	5 December 1987
17	Leyton Orient	2–0	Swansea City	5 December 1987
18	Cambridge United	0–1	Yeovil Town (6)	5 December 1987
19	VS Rugby (6)	1–1	Bristol Rovers	5 December 1987
Replay	Bristol Rovers	4–0	VS Rugby	17 December 1987
20	Welling United (5)	0–1	Bath City (5)	5 December 1987

== Third round proper ==
Teams from the Football League First and Second Divisions entered in this round. The third round of games in the FA Cup were played over the weekend 9–11 January 1988, with the first set of replays being played on 12–13 January. Three games went to second replays and one of these to a third replay. Yeovil Town was again the lowest-ranked team in the draw, while Macclesfield Town, Maidstone United, Sutton United, Bath City and Yeovil were the last non-league clubs left in the competition.

Tie no	Home team	Score	Away team	Date
1	Sutton United (5)	1–1	Middlesbrough (2)	9 January 1988
Replay	Middlesbrough	1–0	Sutton United	12 January 1988
2	Watford (1)	1–1	Hull City (2)	9 January 1988
Replay	Hull City	2–2	Watford	12 January 1988
Replay	Watford	1–0	Hull City	18 January 1988
3	Yeovil Town (6)	0–3	Queens Park Rangers (1)	9 January 1988
4	Reading (2)	0–1	Southampton (1)	9 January 1988
5	Gillingham (3)	0–3	Birmingham City (2)	9 January 1988
6	Blackburn Rovers (2)	1–2	Portsmouth (1)	9 January 1988
7	Sheffield Wednesday (1)	1–1	Everton (1)	9 January 1988
Replay	Everton	1–1	Sheffield Wednesday	13 January 1988
Replay	Everton	1–1	Sheffield Wednesday	25 January 1988
Replay	Sheffield Wednesday	0–5	Everton	27 January 1988
8	Derby County (1)	1–3	Chelsea (1)	9 January 1988
9	Swindon Town (2)	0–0	Norwich City (1)	9 January 1988
Replay	Norwich City	0–2	Swindon Town	13 January 1988
10	Shrewsbury Town (2)	2–1	Bristol Rovers (3)	9 January 1988
11	Sheffield United (2)	1–0	Maidstone United (5)	9 January 1988
12	Ipswich Town (2)	1–2	Manchester United (1)	10 January 1988
13	Stockport County (4)	1–2	Leyton Orient (4)	9 January 1988
14	Newcastle United (1)	1–0	Crystal Palace (2)	9 January 1988
15	Barnsley (2)	3–1	Bolton Wanderers (4)	9 January 1988
16	Coventry City (1)	2–0	Torquay United (4)	9 January 1988
17	West Ham United (1)	2–0	Charlton Athletic (1)	9 January 1988
18	Brighton & Hove Albion (3)	2–0	AFC Bournemouth (2)	9 January 1988
19	Plymouth Argyle (2)	2–0	Colchester United (4)	11 January 1988
20	Bradford City (2)	2–1	Wolverhampton Wanderers (4)	9 January 1988
21	Oldham Athletic (2)	2–4	Tottenham Hotspur (1)	9 January 1988
22	Wimbledon (1)	4–1	West Bromwich Albion (2)	9 January 1988
23	Scunthorpe United (4)	0–0	Blackpool (3)	9 January 1988
Replay	Blackpool	1–0	Scunthorpe United	12 January 1988
24	Huddersfield Town (2)	2–2	Manchester City (2)	9 January 1988
Replay	Manchester City	0–0	Huddersfield Town	12 January 1988
Replay	Huddersfield Town	0–3	Manchester City	25 January 1988
25	Mansfield Town (3)	4–0	Bath City (5)	9 January 1988
26	Port Vale (3)	1–0	Macclesfield Town (5)	10 January 1988
27	Halifax Town (4)	0–4	Nottingham Forest (1)	9 January 1988
28	Arsenal (1)	2–0	Millwall (2)	9 January 1988
29	Leeds United (2)	1–2	Aston Villa (2)	9 January 1988
30	Stoke City (2)	0–0	Liverpool (1)	9 January 1988
Replay	Liverpool	1–0	Stoke City	12 January 1988
31	Oxford United (1)	2–0	Leicester City (2)	9 January 1988
32	Hartlepool United (4)	1–2	Luton Town (1)	9 January 1988

== Fourth round proper ==
The fourth round of games were played over the weekend 30 January – 1 February 1988, with replays being played on 3 February. A second replay was then played on 9 February. Holders Coventry City were eliminated by Watford. Fourth Division side Leyton Orient was the lowest-ranked team in the draw.

Tie no	Home team	Score	Away team	Date
1	Blackpool	1–1	Manchester City	30 January 1988
Replay	Manchester City	2–1	Blackpool	3 February 1988
2	Aston Villa	0–2	Liverpool	31 January 1988
3	Luton Town	2–1	Southampton	30 January 1988
4	Everton	1–1	Middlesbrough	30 January 1988
Replay	Middlesbrough	2–2	Everton	3 February 1988
Replay	Everton	2–1	Middlesbrough	9 February 1988
5	Newcastle United	5–0	Swindon Town	30 January 1988
6	Queens Park Rangers	3–1	West Ham United	30 January 1988
7	Barnsley	0–2	Birmingham City	30 January 1988
8	Coventry City	0–2	Watford	30 January 1988
9	Portsmouth	2–1	Sheffield United	1 February 1988
10	Brighton & Hove Albion	1–2	Arsenal	30 January 1988
11	Manchester United	2–0	Chelsea	30 January 1988
12	Plymouth Argyle	1–0	Shrewsbury Town	30 January 1988
13	Bradford City	4–2	Oxford United	30 January 1988
14	Mansfield Town	1–2	Wimbledon	30 January 1988
15	Port Vale	2–1	Tottenham Hotspur	30 January 1988
16	Leyton Orient	1–2	Nottingham Forest	30 January 1988

== Fifth round proper ==
The fifth set of games was played over the weekend 20–21 February 1988, with replays on 23–24 February. Port Vale, from the Third Division, was the lowest-ranked team in the draw and the last team from the First Round left in the competition.

Tie no	Home team	Score	Away team	Date
1	Everton	0–1	Liverpool	21 February 1988
2	Newcastle United	1–3	Wimbledon	20 February 1988
3	Manchester City	3–1	Plymouth Argyle	20 February 1988
4	Queens Park Rangers	1–1	Luton Town	20 February 1988
Replay	Luton Town	1–0	Queens Park Rangers	24 February 1988
5	Portsmouth	3–0	Bradford City	20 February 1988
6	Port Vale	0–0	Watford	20 February 1988
Replay	Watford	2–0	Port Vale	23 February 1988
7	Arsenal	2–1	Manchester United	20 February 1988
8	Birmingham City	0–1	Nottingham Forest	20 February 1988

== Sixth round proper ==
The sixth round of FA Cup games were played over the weekend 12–13 March 1988. There were no replays.

Tie no	Home team	Score	Away team	Date
1	Luton Town	3–1	Portsmouth	12 March 1988
2	Manchester City	0–4	Liverpool	13 March 1988
3	Wimbledon	2–1	Watford	12 March 1988
4	Arsenal	1–2	Nottingham Forest	12 March 1988

== Semi-finals ==
Luton Town's fine season in the cup competitions culminated in a semi-final clash with Wimbledon at White Hart Lane. Wimbledon emerged as 2-1 winners to reach the FA Cup final, in only their second season in the First Division and their 11th in the Football League.

On the same day, First Division leaders Liverpool took on a resurgent Nottingham Forest at Hillsborough. Top scorer John Aldridge found the net twice in a 2–1 win.

9 April 1988

Luton Town	1 – 2	Wimbledon
Harford 48'		Fashanu 56' (pen.); Wise 80'

White Hart Lane, London
Attendance: 25,963

Referee:- Keith Hackett (Sheffield)

9 April 1988

Liverpool	2 – 1	Nottingham Forest
Aldridge 14' (pen.), 51'		Clough 67'

Hillsborough Stadium, Sheffield
Attendance: 51,627

Referee:- George Courtney (Spennymoor)

== Final ==
14 May 1988
15:00 BST

Wimbledon	1–0	Liverpool
Sanchez 37'

Wembley, London
Attendance: 98,203
Referee: Brian Hill

Wimbledon	Liverpool

== Television coverage ==
The right to show FA Cup games was, as with Football League matches, shared between the BBC and ITV. The stations would alternate between showing a live game and a highlights programme. No games from Rounds 1 or 2 were shown. Occasional highlights of replays would be shown on either the BBC or ITV.

These matches were.

Round	BBC1	ITV
Third round proper	Ipswich Town vs Manchester United	Sutton United v Middlesbrough; Yeovil Town v Queen's Park Rangers^{1} Sheffield Wednesday v Everton^{1} Reading vs Southampton - TVS; Swindon Town vs Norwich City - HTV West; Everton v Sheffield Wednesday (Replay)^{1} Norwich City vs Swindon Town (Replay)^{1} Everton v Sheffield Wednesday (2nd Replay)^{1} Sheffield Wednesday v Everton (3rd Replay)^{1}
Fourth round proper	Manchester United v Chelsea^{1} Port Vale vs Tottenham Hotspur^{1} Leyton Orient vs Nottingham Forest ^{1}	Aston Villa vs Liverpool^{1} Middlesbrough vs Everton (Replay)^{1} Manchester City vs Blackpool (Replay)
Fifth round proper	Everton v Liverpool^{1}	Arsenal vs Manchester United^{1} Newcastle United vs Wimbledon^{1} Port Vale vs Watford; Portsmouth vs Bradford City - TVS
Sixth round proper	Arsenal vs Nottingham Forest^{1} Wimbledon vs Watford^{1} Luton Town vs Portsmouth	Manchester City vs Liverpool^{1}
Semi-finals	Liverpool vs Nottingham Forest ^{1} Luton Town vs Wimbledon ^{1}	
Final	Wimbledon vs Liverpool ^{1}	Wimbledon vs Liverpool ^{1}

^{1}Footage available on YouTube
