= Crazy Gang (football) =

Wimbledon F.C. teams of the 1980s and 1990s

The Crazy Gang is a nickname for the Wimbledon F.C. teams of the 1980s and '90s. The name, originally that of a group of British comedy entertainers popular in the late 1930s, became associated with Wimbledon because of the boisterously macho behaviour of their players, practical jokes, their aggressive style of play and reputation for a lack of discipline on the pitch.

Despite enjoying decent success as a fixture in the First Division and later Premier League, their general approach to the game was often derided as unprofessional and simplistic in comparison to the style of football played by most of their competitors. England striker Gary Lineker once commented dismissively, "the best way to watch Wimbledon is on Ceefax", criticising the team's supposedly unsophisticated approach to football. Their physical style and aggressive reputation on the field often intimidated their supposedly more skilled opponents and helped the club to the most successful period in its history, as they won the 1988 FA Cup and also achieved regular finishes in the top half of the league.

The name originated in the immediate aftermath of Wimbledon's 1988 FA Cup final victory over Liverpool, when BBC commentator John Motson declared that "the crazy gang has beaten the culture club". Most closely associated with the team of that period, notable members included Vinnie Jones, Dennis Wise, Dave Beasant, John Fashanu and Lawrie Sanchez. Under the management of Dave Bassett, they climbed from the Fourth Division to the First Division in four seasons leading up to 1986 without ever changing their straightforward playing style.

== History ==
Although the club had been known for its players' often outlandish behaviour since the early 1980s, the team became more widely recognised for it following their promotion to the First Division in 1986. Practical jokes and initiations for new players were commonplace. These ranged from players being stripped and forced to walk home naked to belongings being set on fire to players being tied to the roof of a car at the training ground and driven at high speeds along the A3, with long-serving midfielder Vinnie Jones saying "you either grew a backbone quickly or dissolved as a man". As the now top-flight team received more attention for their antics from the media, they also became subject to constant criticism from many pundits and fellow players, who accused the team of a simplistic, overly aggressive and intimidating approach to football in comparison to the other teams in the league. This newfound scrutiny created a close bond and tenacious camaraderie among the players, who adopted an "us vs them" mentality on the field. Players such as Vinnie Jones and John Fashanu were often accused of showing little regard for their opponent's safety and deliberately making dangerous, risky tackles. They received significant attention after Gary Stevens and Gary Mabbutt of Tottenham Hotspur were badly injured in separate incidents following challenges from Jones and Fashanu respectively. Stevens never fully recovered and retired from the sport four years later.

As the team saw success in the First Division, their most famous moment came in 1988, when they upset league champions Liverpool to win the FA Cup. The "Crazy Gang" nickname was coined at the final whistle, when BBC commentator John Motson declared that "The Crazy Gang have beaten the Culture Club". The name then caught on nationally, frequently appearing in newspaper reports, and was often used in TV and radio coverage of the club. The team finished seventh in the league that season, having finished sixth a year earlier on their debut in the top flight.

Despite many key members of the team leaving in the aftermath of the FA Cup victory, the media and the club itself continued to use the nickname, with Wimbledon chairman Sam Hammam adopting it for marketing purposes and having it embroidered on the team's shirts for a period of time in the 1990s. The club continued to achieve respectable finishes in the top flight throughout the 1990s, and were founding members of the Premier League in 1992. They finished in the top 10 of the league seven times, peaking at sixth place in 1987 and again in 1994, and reached the semi-finals of the FA Cup and the League Cup in the 1996–97 season. Their final serious attempt at winning silverware came in the 1998–99 season, when they again reached the semi-finals of the League Cup. Wimbledon were relegated from the Premier League in 2000 after 14 years in the top flight.

In 2002, the original club was relocated by its owner to Milton Keynes and was re-named Milton Keynes Dons F.C.. Supporters of the original club were strongly opposed to moving the club so far away from Wimbledon, and subsequently formed AFC Wimbledon. As of the 2024–25 season, MK Dons play in EFL League Two having been relegated the during the 2022-2023 season, whilst AFC Wimbledon once again play in EFL League One, having been relegated in the 2021-22 season but returned to League One at the end of the 2024-25 season, having won the playoff final after finishing 5th in League Two.

== See also ==
- Spice Boys of Liverpool
- Sam Hammam
- The Crazy Gang
