= 1989–90 Millwall F.C. season =

Millwall F.C.
1989–90 season
- Manager: John Docherty (until 13 February 1990); Bob Pearson (from 14 February 1990)
- Football League First Division: 20th Relegated
- FA Cup: Fourth Round
- League Cup: Third Round

This article documents the 1989–90 season of football club Millwall F.C., who were in the First Division for only the second time in their history.

Having defied the odds to spend most of the 1988-89 season as outsiders in the title race, Millwall had eventually finished 10th in the First Division.

Millwall started the 1989-90 season in strong form, briefly topping the table after winning three of their first five league games. However, they won just two more league games all season and we’re relegated in bottom place with several games remaining. By the time relegation was confirmed, manager John Docherty had been sacked and replaced by Bruce Rioch.

== League table ==
Pos	Team	Pld	W	D	L	GF	GA	GD	Pts	Qualification or relegation
16	Derby County	38	13	7	18	43	40	+3	46	
17	Luton Town	38	10	13	15	43	57	−14	43	
18	Sheffield Wednesday (R)	38	11	10	17	35	51	−16	43	Relegation to the Second Division
19	Charlton Athletic (R)	38	7	9	22	31	57	−26	30	Relegation to the Second Division
20	Millwall (R)	38	5	11	22	39	65	−26	26	Relegation to the Second Division

Source: World Football
Rules for classification: 1) Points; 2) Goal difference; 3) Goals scored
(R) Relegated

== Results ==
=== First Division ===
19 August 1989 1	Southampton	1–2	Millwall	Southampton
	Ruddock 71'		Briley 38'; Cascarino 89'	Stadium: The Dell; Attendance: 14,201

22 August 1989 2	Millwall	2–2	Charlton Athletic	London
	Sheringham 86'; Dawes 90'		Mortimer 32'; Williams 85'	Stadium: The Den; Attendance: 14,806

26 August 1989 3	Millwall	1–0	Nottingham Forest	London
	Carter			Stadium: The Den; Attendance: 12,140

29 August 1989 4	Wimbledon	2–2	Millwall	London
	Fairweather; Cork		Anthrobus; Cascarino	Stadium: Plough Lane; Attendance: 8,865

9 September 1989 5	Millwall	4–1	Coventry City	London
	Sheringham x2 Anthrobus; Dawes		Smith	Stadium: The Den; Attendance: 12,062

16 September 1989 6	Manchester United	5–1	Millwall	Manchester
	Hughes x3 Robson; Sharpe		Sheringham	Stadium: Old Trafford; Attendance: 42,746

23 September 1989 7	Millwall	2–0	Sheffield Wednesday	London
	Carter; Cascarino			Stadium: The Den; Attendance: 11,287

30 September 1989 8	Millwall	0–1	Norwich City	London
			Bowen	Stadium: The Den; Attendance: 13,925

14 October 1989 9	Everton	2–1	Millwall	Liverpool
	Sheedy; Whiteside		Sheringham	Stadium: Goodison Park; Attendance: 26,125

21 October 1989 10	Crystal Palace	4–3	Millwall	London
	Wright x2 Bright x2		Hopkins o.g.' Cascarino; Anthrobus	Stadium: Selhurst Park; Attendance: 18,920

28 October 1989 11	Millwall	1–1	Luton Town	London
	Dawes		Elstrup	Stadium: The Den; Attendance: 11,140

4 November 1989 12	Chelsea	4–0	Millwall	London
	Wilson x2 Dixon x2			Stadium: Stamford Bridge; Attendance: 24,969

11 November 1989 13	Millwall	1–2	Arsenal	London
	Sheringham		Thomas; Quinn	Stadium: The Den; Attendance: 17,265

19 November 1989 14	Millwall	1–2	Liverpool	London
	Thompson		Barnes; Rush	Stadium: The Den; Attendance: 13,547

25 November 1989 15	Queens Park Rangers	0–0	Millwall	London
				Stadium: Loftus Road; Attendance: 9,141

2 December 1989 16	Millwall	2–2	Southampton	London
	Cascarino; Stephenson		Rideout; Le Tissier pen.'	Stadium: The Den; Attendance: 10,470

9 December 1989 17	Charlton Athletic	1–1	Millwall	London
	Minto		Anthrobus	Stadium: Selhurst Park; Attendance: 11,017

16 December 1989 18	Millwall	2–0	Aston Villa	London
	Cascarino; Stephenson			Stadium: The Den; Attendance: 10,528

26 December 1989 19	Tottenham Hotspur	3–1	Millwall	London
	Samways; Lineker; McLeary o.g.'		Cascarino	Stadium: White Hart Lane; Attendance: 26,874

30 December 1989 20	Manchester City	2–0	Millwall	Manchester
	White x2			Stadium: Maine Road; Attendance: 28,084

1 January 1990 21	Millwall	1–1	Derby County	London
	Dawes		Pickering	Stadium: The Den; Attendance: 12,790

13 January 1990 22	Nottingham Forest	3–1	Millwall	Nottingham
	Clough; Laws; Hodge		Sheringham	Stadium: City Ground; Attendance: 18,065

20 January 1990 23	Millwall	0–0	Wimbledon	London
				Stadium: The Den; Attendance: 11,780

3 February 1990 24	Sheffield Wednesday	1–1	Millwall	Sheffield
	Hirst		Sheringham	Stadium: Hillsborough; Attendance: 17,737

10 February 1990 25	Millwall	1–2	Manchester United	London
	Morgan		Wallace; Hughes	Stadium: The Den; Attendance: 15,491

17 February 1990 26	Coventry City	3–1	Millwall	Coventry
	Smith; Livingstone x2		Cascarino	Stadium: Highfield Road; Attendance: 10,981

24 February 1990 27	Millwall	1–2	Queens Park Rangers	London
	Cascarino		Barker; Wegerle	Stadium: The Den; Attendance: 11,505

3 March 1990 28	Liverpool	1–0	Millwall	Liverpool
	Gillespie			Stadium: Anfield; Attendance: 36,247

17 March 1990 29	Norwich City	1–1	Millwall	Norwich
	Townsend		Sheringham	Stadium: Carrow Road; Attendance: 14,699

21 March 1990 30	Millwall	1–2	Everton	London
	Goddard		Pointon; Cottee	Stadium: The Den; Attendance: 11,495

24 March 1990 31	Luton Town	2–1	Millwall	Luton
	McCarthy o.g.' Black		Briley	Stadium: Kenilworth Road; Attendance: 9,027

31 March 1990 32	Millwall	1–2	Crystal Palace	London
	Allen		Bright; Gray	Stadium: The Den; Attendance: 13,332

7 April 1990 33	Millwall	1–1	Manchester City	London
	Thompson		Ward	Stadium: The Den; Attendance: 10,265

14 April 1990 34	Derby County	2–0	Millwall	Luton
	Harford			Stadium: Baseball Ground; Attendance: 13,718

16 April 1990 35	Millwall	0–1	Tottenham Hotspur	London
			Lineker	Stadium: The Den; Attendance: 10,574

21 April 1990 36	Aston Villa	1–0	Millwall	Birmingham
	Platt			Stadium: Villa Park; Attendance: 21,028

28 April 1990 37	Arsenal	2–0	Millwall	London
	Davis; Merson			Stadium: Highbury; Attendance: 25,607

5 May 1990 38	Millwall	1–3	Chelsea	London
	Allen		Dixon x3	Stadium: The Den; Attendance: 12,230

=== FA Cup ===
6 January 1990 Third Round	Manchester City	0–0	Millwall	Manchester
				Stadium: Maine Road

9 January 1990 Third Round Replay	Millwall	1–1	Manchester City	London
				Stadium: The Den

15 January 1990 Third Round Second Replay	Millwall	3–1	Manchester City	London
				Stadium: The Den

27 January 1990 Fourth Round	Millwall	1–1	Cambridge United	London
				Stadium: The Den

30 January 1990 Fourth Round Replay	Cambridge United	1–0	Millwall	Cambridge
				Stadium: Abbey Stadium

=== League Cup ===
19 September 1989 Second Round First Leg	Stoke City	1–0	Millwall	Stoke-on-Trent
				Stadium: Victoria Ground; Attendance: 8,030

3 October 1989 Second Round Second Leg	Millwall	2–0 (2–1 agg.)	Stoke City	London
				Stadium: The Den; Attendance: 8,637

23 October 1989 Third Round	Tranmere Rovers	3–2	Millwall	Birkenhead
				Stadium: Prenton Park; Attendance: 11,626

=== Full Members' Cup ===
13 December 1989 Southern Section Second Round	Swindon Town	2–1	Millwall	Swindon
				Stadium: County Ground; Attendance: 3,223

== Squad ==
Note: Flags indicate national team as defined under FIFA eligibility rules; some limited exceptions apply. Players may hold more than one non-FIFA nationality.

Pos.	Nation	Player
GK	IRL	Keith Branagan
GK	ENG	Brian Horne
DF	ENG	David Thompson
DF	ENG	Alan McLeary
DF	ENG	Danis Salman
DF	ENG	Keith Stevens
DF	IRL	Phil Babb
DF	IRL	Kenny Cunningham
DF	IRL	Mick McCarthy
DF	ENG	Steve Wood
DF	ENG	Ian Dawes
DF	ENG	Sean Sparham
DF	ENG	Nicky Coleman
MF	ENG	Les Briley
MF	ENG	Jimmy Carter

Pos.	Nation	Player
MF	ENG	Terry Hurlock
MF	ENG	Wes Reid
MF	IRL	Gary Waddock
MF	ENG	Darren Morgan
MF	IRL	Kevin O'Callaghan
MF	ENG	Paul Stephenson
MF	ENG	Darren Treacy
FW	IRL	Tony Cascarino
FW	ENG	Paul Goddard
FW	ENG	Teddy Sheringham
FW	WAL	Malcolm Allen
FW	ENG	Steve Anthrobus
FW	ENG	Dean Horrix
FW	ENG	Steve Torpey
