= 1992–93 Millwall F.C. season =

Millwall
1992–93 season
- Chairman: Reg Burr
- Manager: Mick McCarthy
- Stadium: The Den
- First Division: 7th
- FA Cup: Third round
- League Cup: First round
- Top goalscorer: Moralee (15)
- Average home league attendance: 9,188
Home colours

During the 1992–93 English football season, Millwall F.C. competed in the Football League First Division.

== Season summary ==
In the 1992–93 season, Millwall's hopes of possible promotion were promising and at one stage where in 3rd place by the end of February but from the end of March until the end of the season, the Lions won only one of their final nine league games and as a result finished six points outside the play-off places in 7th place. This was also Millwall's final season at The Den before moving to The New Den in May 1993.

== Final league table ==
Pos	Team	Pld	W	D	L	GF	GA	GD	Pts	Qualification or relegation
5	Swindon Town (O, P)	46	21	13	12	74	59	+15	76	Qualification for the First Division play-offs
6	Leicester City	46	22	10	14	71	64	+7	76	Qualification for the First Division play-offs
7	Millwall	46	18	16	12	65	53	+12	70	
8	Derby County	46	19	9	18	68	57	+11	66	
9	Grimsby Town	46	19	7	20	58	57	+1	64	

Source: rsssf.com
Rules for classification: 1) Points; 2) Goals scored; 3) Goal difference
(O) Play-off winners; (P) Promoted

== Results ==
Millwall's score comes first

=== Legend ===
Win	Draw	Loss

=== Football League First Division ===
Date	Opponent	Venue	Result	Attendance	Scorers
15 August 1992	Watford	A	1–3	9,745	McGinlay
22 August 1992	Oxford United	H	3–1	6,746	Rae, Armstrong, Allen
29 August 1992	Barnsley	A	0–0	4,795	
5 September 1992	Swindon Town	H	2–1	8,091	McGinlay, Goodman
12 September 1992	Birmingham City	H	0–0	8,581	
15 September 1992	Peterborough United	A	0–0	5,619	
19 September 1992	Notts County	H	6–0	6,689	Goodman, Allen (2), Barber (2), Dolby
26 September 1992	Brentford	A	1–1	8,823	Allen
3 October 1992	Sunderland	A	0–2	14,871	
10 October 1992	Cambridge United	H	2–2	7,096	Allen, Goodman
18 October 1992	Charlton Athletic	A	2–0	7,527	Rae, Moralee
25 October 1992	Wolverhampton Wanderers	H	2–0	6,543	Cooper, Moralee
31 October 1992	Bristol Rovers	A	0–1	5,378	
4 November 1992	Bristol City	H	4–1	5,934	Cooper, Allen, May, Moralee
7 November 1992	Derby County	A	2–1	17,087	Moralee, Rae
15 November 1992	West Ham United	H	2–1	12,445	Allen (pen), Barber
21 November 1992	Luton Town	A	1–1	8,371	Byrne
28 November 1992	Portsmouth	A	0–1	12,445	
5 December 1992	Southend United	H	1–1	7,928	Barber
12 December 1992	Grimsby Town	H	2–1	6,900	Moralee (2)
20 December 1992	Newcastle United	A	1–1	26,089	Moralee
26 December 1992	Tranmere Rovers	A	1–1	13,118	Goodman
28 December 1992	Leicester City	H	2–0	12,230	Moralee, Goodman
9 January 1993	Notts County	A	2–1	6,148	Moralee, Goodman
17 January 1993	Brentford	H	6–1	7,571	Rae, Cooper, Goodman (2), Moralee (2)
27 January 1993	Peterborough United	H	4–0	8,732	Barber, T McCarthy, Rae, Goodman
30 January 1993	Oxford United	A	0–3	7,474	
6 February 1993	Watford	H	5–2	8,847	Moralee (2), Rae, Cooper, Goodman
9 February 1993	Birmingham City	A	0–0	8,504	
13 February 1993	Swindon Town	A	0–3	10,544	
20 February 1993	Barnsley	H	0–4	8,034	
27 February 1993	Cambridge United	A	1–1	5,144	Allen
6 March 1993	Sunderland	H	0–0	8,761	
9 March 1993	Bristol City	A	1–0	8,771	Barber
13 March 1993	Derby County	H	1–0	9,395	Allen (pen)
21 March 1993	Southend United	A	3–3	3,840	Barber, Stevens, Goodman
24 March 1993	Luton Town	H	1–0	8,286	Moralee
28 March 1993	West Ham United	A	2–2	15,723	Moralee, Stevens
3 April 1993	Portsmouth	H	1–1	12,921	Kerr
6 April 1993	Grimsby Town	A	0–1	4,445	
10 April 1993	Tranmere Rovers	H	0–0	9,392	
14 April 1993	Leicester City	A	0–3	19,611	
17 April 1993	Newcastle United	H	1–2	14,262	Barber
24 April 1993	Charlton Athletic	H	1–0	10,159	Goodman
1 May 1993	Wolverhampton Wanderers	A	1–3	12,054	Allen
8 May 1993	Bristol Rovers	H	0–3	15,821	

=== FA Cup ===
Round	Date	Opponent	Venue	Result	Attendance	Goalscorers
R3	13 January 1993	Southend United	A	0–1	8,028	

=== League Cup ===
Round	Date	Opponent	Venue	Result	Attendance	Goalscorers
R1 First Leg	18 August 1992	Leyton Orient	A	2–2	4,939	Roberts, Stevens
R1 Second Leg	26 August 1992	Leyton Orient	H	3–0 (won 5–2 on agg)	5,444	Armstrong, Allen (2)
R2 First Leg	22 September 1992	Arsenal	A	1–1	20,940	Roberts
R2 Second Leg	7 October 1992	Arsenal	H	1–1 (lost 1–3 on pens)	16,994	Dixon (own goal)

=== Anglo-Italian Cup ===
Round	Date	Opponent	Venue	Result	Attendance	Goalscorers
PR Group 6	2 September 1992	Charlton Athletic	H	1–2	3,975	Cunningham
PR Group 6	29 September 1992	Portsmouth	A	1–1	2,535	Rae

== Squad ==
Note: Flags indicate national team as defined under FIFA eligibility rules; some limited exceptions apply. Players may hold more than one non-FIFA nationality.

Pos.	Nation	Player
GK	USA	Kasey Keller
DF	IRL	Kenny Cunningham
DF	ENG	Colin Cooper
DF	ENG	Keith Stevens
DF	ENG	Ian Dawes
MF	ENG	Phil Barber
MF	ENG	Andy Roberts
MF	IRL	Andy May
MF	SCO	Alex Rae
MF	ENG	Ian Bogie
FW	WAL	Malcolm Allen
FW	IRL	Jon Goodman
FW	ENG	Jamie Moralee
FW	IRL	John Byrne
FW	SCO	John McGinlay
DF	WAL	Gavin Maguire
MF	ENG	Tony Dolby
DF	IRL	Tony McCarthy
MF	ENG	Paul Holsgrove
DF	ENG	Alan McLeary

Pos.	Nation	Player
FW	ENG	Chris Armstrong
GK	NIR	Aidan Davison
FW	ENG	Danny Wallace (on loan from Manchester United)
MF	ENG	Paul Stephenson
DF	ENG	Paul Manning
DF	IRL	Mick McCarthy (player-manager)
FW	IRL	Tommy Gaynor
MF	IRL	Mark Kennedy
MF	NED	Etienne Verveer
MF	ENG	Mark Beard
GK	ENG	Carl Emberson
FW	USA	John Kerr
MF	ENG	Geoff Pitcher
DF	WAL	Ben Thatcher
MF	ENG	Jermaine Wright
GK	ENG	Brian Horne
MF	SCO	John McGlashan
DF	ENG	Mark Foran
