= 1991–92 Millwall F.C. season =

Millwall
1991–92 season
- Chairman: Reg Burr
- Manager: Bruce Rioch (until 17 March); Mick McCarthy (player-manager from 17 March)
- Stadium: The Old Den
- Second Division: 15th
- FA Cup: Fourth round
- League Cup: Second round
- Full Members Cup: Second round
- Top goalscorer: League: Kerr (12); All: Kerr/Rae (13)
- Average home league attendance: 7,907

During the 1991–92 English football season, Millwall F.C. competed in the Football League Second Division.

== Season summary ==
In the 1991–92 season, Millwall were looking to challenge for automatic promotion but started the campaign poorly with 1 win from their first 7 league games which saw them in relegation zone near the end of September and even though their form slightly improved onwards, manager Rioch was sacked after a 6–1 defeat at Portsmouth and Mick McCarthy took over as player-manager and kept them up from possible relegation, with Millwall finishing in a disappointing 15th place.

== Final league table ==
Pos	Team	Pld	W	D	L	GF	GA	GD	Pts	Qualification or relegation
13	Bristol Rovers	46	16	14	16	60	63	−3	62	Qualification for the First Division (Note: From the 1992–93 season, the first tier became the Premier League, the second tier - then known as the Second Division - was renamed to the First Division, and the third tier - then known as the Third Division - was renamed to the Second Division.)
14	Tranmere Rovers	46	14	19	13	56	56	0	61	Qualification for the First Division
15	Millwall	46	17	10	19	64	71	−7	61	Qualification for the First Division
16	Barnsley	46	16	11	19	46	57	−11	59	Qualification for the First Division
17	Bristol City	46	13	15	18	55	71	−16	54	Qualification for the First Division

Rules for classification: 1) Points; 2) Goal difference; 3) Goals scored

== Results ==
Millwall's score comes first

=== Legend ===
Win	Draw	Loss

=== Football League Second Division ===
Date	Opponent	Venue	Result	Attendance	Scorers
17 August 1991	Middlesbrough	A	0–1	16,234	
24 August 1991	Sunderland	H	4–1	9,936	Barber (2), Falco, Kerr
31 August 1991	Plymouth Argyle	A	2–3	5,369	Rae, Burrows (own goal)
4 September 1991	Brighton & Hove Albion	H	1–2	9,266	Falco
7 September 1991	Cambridge United	H	1–2	8,459	Kerr (pen)
14 September 1991	Oxford United	A	2–2	4,347	Colquhoun, Rae
17 September 1991	Bristol City	A	2–2	10,862	Falco, Colquhoun
21 September 1991	Newcastle United	H	2–1	9,156	Kerr (2)
28 September 1991	Barnsley	A	2–0	6,544	Rae (2)
5 October 1991	Blackburn Rovers	H	1–3	8,026	Cooper
12 October 1991	Southend United	A	3–2	7,266	Rae, Stephenson, Colquhoun
19 October 1991	Ipswich Town	A	0–0	11,175	
26 October 1991	Derby County	H	1–2	7,660	Kerr
29 October 1991	Watford	A	2–0	7,333	Rae, Kerr
2 November 1991	Portsmouth	H	1–1	6,060	Armstrong
5 November 1991	Tranmere Rovers	A	1–2	6,108	Kerr (pen)
9 November 1991	Port Vale	A	2–0	8,944	Falco (2)
16 November 1991	Wolverhampton Wanderers	H	2–1	9,469	Barber, McGinlay
23 November 1991	Grimsby Town	A	1–1	5,701	McGinlay
30 November 1991	Bristol Rovers	H	0–1	7,824	
7 December 1991	Leicester City	A	1–1	12,127	Kerr
21 December 1991	Brighton & Hove Albion	A	4–3	7,598	McGinlay (2), Kerr (pen), Verveer
26 December 1991	Watford	H	0–4	9,237	
28 December 1991	Plymouth Argyle	H	2–1	6,980	McCarthy, McGinlay
1 January 1992	Swindon Town	A	1–3	9,760	McGinlay
11 January 1992	Sunderland	A	2–6	16,533	Rae, Kerr
18 January 1992	Middlesbrough	H	2–0	8,125	McGinlay, Rae
1 February 1992	Ipswich Town	H	2–3	8,867	Rae, Kerr (pen)
8 February 1992	Derby County	A	2–0	12,773	McGinlay, Rae
15 February 1992	Grimsby Town	H	1–1	6,807	Rae
22 February 1992	Bristol Rovers	A	2–3	5,747	Goodman, Armstrong
26 February 1992	Charlton Athletic	H	1–0	12,882	Kerr (pen)
29 February 1992	Leicester City	H	2–0	7,562	Cooper, Goodman
7 March 1992	Charlton Athletic	A	0–1	8,177	
11 March 1992	Tranmere Rovers	H	0–3	6,456	
14 March 1992	Portsmouth	A	1–6	14,944	Verveer
21 March 1992	Port Vale	H	1–0	6,148	Allen
28 March 1992	Wolverhampton Wanderers	A	0–0	11,880	
1 April 1992	Oxford United	H	2–1	5,946	Stephenson, Goodman
4 April 1992	Cambridge United	A	0–1	6,385	
8 April 1992	Swindon Town	H	1–1	6,722	Allen
11 April 1992	Bristol City	H	2–3	6,989	Barber, Atteveld (own goal)
18 April 1992	Newcastle United	A	1–0	23,821	Allen
22 April 1992	Barnsley	H	1–1	5,703	Allen (pen)
25 April 1992	Blackburn Rovers	A	1–2	12,820	Armstrong
2 May 1992	Southend United	H	2–0	7,574	Armstrong, Allen

=== FA Cup ===
Round	Date	Opponent	Venue	Result	Attendance	Goalscorers
R3	4 January 1992	Huddersfield Town	A	4–0	10,879	Thompson, Verveer, Rae (2)
R4	5 February 1992	Norwich City	A	1–2	17,010	Kerr

=== League Cup ===
Round	Date	Opponent	Venue	Result	Attendance	Goalscorers
R2 First Leg	25 September 1991	Swindon Town	H	2–2	6,048	Stephenson, Armstrong
R2 Second Leg	8 October 1991	Swindon Town	A	1–3 (lost 3–5 on agg)	7,134	Colquhoun

=== Full Members Cup ===
Round	Date	Opponent	Venue	Result	Attendance	Goalscorers
SR2	24 September 1991	Plymouth Argyle	A	0–4	2,022	

== Squad ==
Note: Flags indicate national team as defined under FIFA eligibility rules; some limited exceptions apply. Players may hold more than one non-FIFA nationality.

Pos.	Nation	Player
GK	NIR	Aidan Davison
GK	IRL	Keith Branagan
GK	USA	Kasey Keller
GK	ENG	Carl Emberson
DF	ENG	Colin Cooper
DF	ENG	Ian Dawes
DF	ENG	David Thompson
DF	ENG	Alan McLeary
DF	ENG	Keith Stevens
DF	IRL	Mick McCarthy
DF	IRL	Kenny Cunningham
DF	ENG	Steve Wood
DF	ENG	Tony Witter
MF	SCO	Alex Rae

Pos.	Nation	Player
MF	ENG	Paul Kerr
MF	ENG	Paul Stephenson
MF	ENG	Phil Barber
MF	NED	Etienne Verveer
MF	ENG	Ian Bogie
MF	SCO	John McGlashan
MF	ENG	Andy Roberts
FW	SCO	John Colquhoun
FW	ENG	Mark Falco
FW	SCO	John McGinlay
FW	IRL	Jon Goodman
FW	WAL	Malcolm Allen
FW	ENG	Chris Armstrong
FW	ENG	Sean Devine
