= 1988–89 Millwall F.C. season =

Millwall
1988–89 season
- Chairman: (England) Reg Burr
- Manager: (Scotland) John Docherty
- Stadium: The Den
- First Division: 10th
- FA Cup: Fourth round
- League Cup: Third round
- Full Members' Cup: Third round
- Top goalscorer: League: Tony Cascarino (13); All: Teddy Sheringham (15); Tony Cascarino (15)
- Highest home attendance: 22,103 (vs. Liverpool)
- Lowest home attendance: 11,394 (vs. Middlesbrough)
- Average home league attendance: 15,468

During the 1988–89 English football season, Millwall Football Club competed in the Football League First Division. This was Millwall's 62nd season in the Football League, and first ever season in the top tier of English football, after achieving promotion from the Second Division as Champions in 1987–88.

== Season summary ==
Millwall had won promotion to the First Division for the first time in their history as Second Division champions at the end of the 1987–88 season, and were among the pre-season favourites for relegation, but defied the odds and were top of the First Division by the beginning of October, having won four of their first six league games. By Christmas, they were still an impressive fifth in the league, but finished 10th at the end of the season after failing to win any of their final 10 games. Their final position in the table was their lowest standing of the season.

Rare low points of the season included being defeated by arch-rivals West Ham United twice during the season, although Millwall still outperformed their local rivals for the first time in decades, as the Hammers were relegated in 19th place.

Millwall finished one place above Manchester United, one of the pre-season title favourites, managing to hold United to a goalless draw at The Den, and spent much of the season in a higher position than other teams who failed to emerge as title contenders after being among the pre-season favourites, including Everton and Tottenham Hotspur – who both eventually finished above Millwall.

Millwall's high placing owed much to the strike partnership of Teddy Sheringham and Tony Cascarino.

In his autobiography, Sheringham said of the season, "It was a crazy exhilarating time. There we were, little Millwall, in our first season in the First Division and topping the table until about March. Everybody said it couldn't last and of course it couldn't and it didn't, but we gave them all a good run for their money. We were beating the best teams when we shouldn't and getting away draws to which we had no right."

== Squad ==
Note: Flags indicate national team as defined under FIFA eligibility rules; some limited exceptions apply. Players may hold more than one non-FIFA nationality.

Pos.	Nation	Player
GK	ENG	Brian Horne
DF	ENG	Ian Dawes
DF	ENG	Alan McLeary
DF	ENG	Keith Stevens
DF	ENG	Dave Thompson
DF	ENG	Sean Sparham
DF	ENG	Darren Treacy
DF	ENG	Neil Ruddock
DF	ENG	Steve Wood
DF	CYP	Danis Salman
MF	ENG	Les Briley (captain)

Pos.	Nation	Player
MF	ENG	Jimmy Carter
MF	ENG	Terry Hurlock
MF	ENG	Paul Stephenson
MF	IRL	Kevin O'Callaghan
MF	ENG	Darren Morgan
MF	ENG	George Lawrence
MF	ENG	Wes Reid
FW	ENG	Steve Anthrobus
FW	ENG	Dean Horrix
FW	ENG	Teddy Sheringham
FW	IRL	Tony Cascarino

== League table ==
Pos	Team	Pld	W	D	L	GF	GA	GD	Pts
8	Everton	38	14	12	12	50	45	+5	54
9	Queens Park Rangers	38	14	11	13	43	37	+6	53
10	Millwall	38	14	11	13	47	52	−5	53
11	Manchester United	38	13	12	13	45	35	+10	51
12	Wimbledon	38	14	9	15	50	46	+4	51

Source: World Football
Rules for classification: 1) Points; 2) Goal difference; 3) Goals scored

== Results ==
=== First Division ===
27 August 1988 1	Aston Villa FC	2–2	Millwall FC

3 September 1988 2	Millwall FC	1–0	Derby County FC

10 September 1988 3	Charlton Athletic FC	0–3	Millwall FC

17 September 1988 4	Millwall FC	2–1	Everton FC

24 September 1988 5	Norwich City FC	2–2	Millwall FC

1 October 1988 6	Millwall FC	3–2	Queens Park Rangers FC

15 October 1988 7	Coventry City FC	0–0	Millwall FC

22 October 1988 8	Millwall FC	2–2	Nottingham Forest FC

29 October 1988 9	Middlesbrough FC	4–2	Millwall FC

5 November 1988 10	Millwall FC	3–1	Luton Town FC

12 November 1988 11	Liverpool FC	1–1	Millwall FC

19 November 1988 12	Millwall FC	4–0	Newcastle United FC

26 November 1988 13	Southampton FC	2–2	Millwall FC

3 December 1988 14	Millwall FC	0–1	West Ham United FC

10 December 1988 15	Tottenham FC	2–0	Millwall FC

17 December 1988 16	Millwall FC	1–0	Sheffield Wednesday FC

26 December 1988 17	Wimbledon FC	1–0	Millwall FC

31 December 1988 18	Derby County FC	0–1	Millwall FC

2 January 1989 19	Millwall FC	1–0	Charlton Athletic FC

14 January 1989 20	Manchester United FC	3–0	Millwall FC

22 January 1989 21	Millwall FC	2–3	Norwich City FC

4 February 1989 22	Queens Park Rangers FC	1–2	Millwall FC

11 February 1989 23	Millwall FC	1–2	Arsenal FC

21 February 1989 24	Millwall FC	2–0	Middlesbrough FC

25 February 1989 25	Millwall FC	1–0	Coventry City FC

28 February 1989 26	Arsenal FC	0–0	Millwall FC

11 March 1989 27	Luton Town FC	1–2	Millwall FC

18 March 1989 28	Millwall FC	2–0	Aston Villa FC

25 March 1989 29	Everton FC	1–1	Millwall FC

27 March 1989 30	Millwall FC	0–1	Wimbledon FC

1 April 1989 31	Sheffield Wednesday FC	3–0	Millwall FC

8 April 1989 32	Millwall FC	0–0	Manchester United FC

11 April 1989 33	Millwall FC	1–2	Liverpool FC

22 April 1989 34	West Ham United FC	3–0	Millwall FC

29 April 1989 35	Millwall FC	0–5	Tottenham FC

3 May 1989 36	Nottingham Forest FC	4–1	Millwall FC

6 May 1989 37	Newcastle United FC	1–1	Millwall FC

13 May 1989 38	Millwall FC	1–1	Southampton FC

=== FA Cup ===
7 January 1989 Round 3	Millwall FC	3–2	Luton Town FC

29 January 1989 Round 4	Millwall FC	0–2	Liverpool FC

=== League Cup ===
27 September 1988 Round 2	Millwall FC	3–0	Gillingham FC

11 October 1988 Round 2	Gillingham FC	1–3	Millwall FC

2 November 1988 Round 3	Aston Villa FC	3–1	Millwall FC

=== Simod Cup ===
9 November 1988	Millwall FC	1–1 (a.e.t.) (3–0 p)	Barnsley FC

29 November 1988	Millwall FC	2–0	Leeds United FC

20 December 1988	Everton FC	2–0	Millwall FC
