= 1993–94 Millwall F.C. season =

Millwall
1993–94 season
- Chairman: Reg Burr
- Manager: Mick McCarthy
- Stadium: The Den
- First Division: 3rd
- FA Cup: Third round
- League Cup: Third round
- Top goalscorer: Rae (13)
- Average home league attendance: 9,823

During the 1993–94 English football season, Millwall F.C. competed in the Football League First Division.

== Season summary ==
The 1993–94 season was their first at the new ground, also known as The Den, which was opened by the Labour Party leader John Smith MP on 4 August 1993. In McCarthy's second full season in charge, he took the club to the play-offs after a strong 3rd-place finish, but they lost out to Derby County in the semi-finals.

== Final league table ==
Pos	Team	Pld	W	D	L	GF	GA	GD	Pts	Qualification or relegation
1	Crystal Palace (C, P)	46	27	9	10	73	46	+27	90	Promotion to the Premier League
2	Nottingham Forest (P)	46	23	14	9	74	49	+25	83	Promotion to the Premier League
3	Millwall	46	19	17	10	58	49	+9	74	Qualification for the First Division play-offs
4	Leicester City (O, P)	46	19	16	11	72	59	+13	73	Qualification for the First Division play-offs
5	Tranmere Rovers	46	21	9	16	69	53	+16	72	Qualification for the First Division play-offs

Source: rsssf.com
Rules for classification: 1) Points; 2) Goals scored; 3) Goal difference
(C) Champions; (O) Play-off winners; (P) Promoted

== Results ==
Millwall's score comes first

=== Legend ===
Win	Draw	Loss

=== Football League First Division ===
Date	Opponent	Venue	Result	Attendance	Scorers
14 August 1993	Stoke City	A	2–1	18,766	Bogie, Murray
22 August 1993	Southend United	H	1–4	10,273	Kerr
25 August 1993	Wolverhampton Wanderers	A	0–2	19,570	
28 August 1993	Leicester City	A	0–4	12,219	
4 September 1993	Barnsley	H	2–0	8,010	Kerr, Rae
11 September 1993	Charlton Athletic	A	0–0	8,416	
18 September 1993	Derby County	H	0–0	9,881	
25 September 1993	Peterborough United	A	0–0	6,219	
2 October 1993	Watford	H	4–1	7,707	Goodman (3), Roberts
9 October 1993	West Bromwich Albion	H	2–1	11,010	Goodman, Rae (pen)
16 October 1993	Bolton Wanderers	A	0–4	9,386	
20 October 1993	Notts County	H	2–0	5,887	Rae (pen), Verveer
24 October 1993	Middlesbrough	H	1–1	6,686	Whyte (own goal)
31 October 1993	Birmingham City	A	0–1	9,377	
3 November 1993	Nottingham Forest	A	3–1	17,584	Goodman, Murray, Stevens
6 November 1993	Oxford United	H	2–2	7,794	Kennedy (2)
13 November 1993	Bristol City	A	2–2	8,416	Rae, Beard
20 November 1993	Tranmere Rovers	H	3–1	8,653	Mitchell, Goodman, Kennedy
27 November 1993	Grimsby Town	H	1–0	7,991	Mitchell
4 December 1993	Oxford United	A	2–0	5,540	Jackson (own goal), Verveer
11 December 1993	Notts County	A	3–1	6,516	Rae (3)
19 December 1993	Stoke City	H	2–0	8,930	Rae, Kennedy
27 December 1993	Portsmouth	H	0–0	12,104	
28 December 1993	Sunderland	A	1–2	19,283	Roberts
1 January 1994	Crystal Palace	H	3–0	16,779	Goodman, Verveer, Rae (pen)
15 January 1994	Bolton Wanderers	H	1–0	9,777	Rae
22 January 1994	West Bromwich Albion	A	0–0	15,172	
6 February 1994	Middlesbrough	A	2–4	6,286	Rae (pen), Moralee
12 February 1994	Birmingham City	H	2–1	9,438	Verveer (2)
2 March 1994	Southend United	A	1–1	4,615	Mitchell
6 March 1994	Leicester City	H	0–0	8,085	
12 March 1994	Derby County	A	0–0	15,303	
15 March 1994	Charlton Athletic	H	2–1	13,320	Rae (2)
22 March 1994	Peterborough United	H	1–0	8,518	Greenman (own goal)
26 March 1994	Watford	A	0–2	9,036	
30 March 1994	Luton Town	H	2–2	9,235	Moralee, Berry
2 April 1994	Portsmouth	A	2–2	11,591	Cunningham, Mitchell
6 April 1994	Sunderland	H	2–1	10,244	Mitchell (2)
9 April 1994	Crystal Palace	A	0–1	23,142	
17 April 1994	Nottingham Forest	H	2–2	12,543	Moralee, Mitchell
20 April 1994	Wolverhampton Wanderers	H	1–0	11,883	Mitchell
23 April 1994	Tranmere Rovers	A	2–3	9,141	Moralee, Kerr
26 April 1994	Luton Town	A	1–1	8,257	Kerr
30 April 1994	Bristol City	H	0–0	11,189	
3 May 1994	Barnsley	A	1–0	5,059	Mitchell
8 May 1994	Grimsby Town	A	0–0	5,355	

=== First Division play-offs ===
Round	Date	Opponent	Venue	Result	Attendance	Scorers
SF 1st Leg	15 May 1994	Derby County	A	0–2	17,401	
SF 2nd Leg	18 May 1994	Derby County	H	1–3 (lost 1–5 on agg)	16,470	Berry

=== FA Cup ===
Round	Date	Opponent	Venue	Result	Attendance	Goalscorers
R3	10 January 1994	Arsenal	H	0–1	20,093	

=== League Cup ===
Round	Date	Opponent	Venue	Result	Attendance	Goalscorers
R2 First Leg	21 September 1993	Watford	A	0–0	5,954	
R2 Second Leg	6 October 1993	Watford	H	4–3 (a.e.t.)	5,381	Huxford, Murray, Moralee, Verveer
R3	27 October 1993	Queens Park Rangers	A	0–3	14,190	

=== Anglo-Italian Cup ===
Round	Date	Opponent	Venue	Result	Attendance	Goalscorers
PR Group 8	1 September 1993	Charlton Athletic	H	2–2	4,003	Roberts, Verveer
PR Group 8	14 September 1993	Crystal Palace	A	0–3	2,712	

== Squad ==
Note: Flags indicate national team as defined under FIFA eligibility rules; some limited exceptions apply. Players may hold more than one non-FIFA nationality.

No.	Pos.	Nation	Player
-	GK	(United States) USA	Kasey Keller
-	DF	(Republic of Ireland) IRL	Kenny Cunningham
-	DF	(England) ENG	Keith Stevens
-	DF	(Wales) WAL	Pat Van Den Hauwe
-	DF	(England) ENG	Ian Dawes
-	MF	(England) ENG	Andy Roberts
-	MF	(Scotland) SCO	Alex Rae
-	MF	(England) ENG	Phil Barber
-	MF	(Netherlands) NED	Etienne Verveer
-	FW	(England) ENG	Jamie Moralee
-	FW	(Australia) AUS	Dave Mitchell
-	FW	(Republic of Ireland) IRL	Jon Goodman
-	DF	(England) ENG	Richard Huxford
-	GK	(England) ENG	Carl Emberson
-	MF	(England) ENG	Tony Dolby
-	FW	(United States) USA	John Kerr
-	MF	(England) ENG	Terry Hurlock
-	MF	(England) ENG	Neil Emblen

No.	Pos.	Nation	Player
-	FW	(England) ENG	Clive Allen
-	MF	(Republic of Ireland) IRL	Mark Kennedy
-	DF	(Wales) WAL	Ben Thatcher
-	MF	(England) ENG	Mark Beard
-	FW	(United States) USA	Bruce Murray
-	MF	(England) ENG	Greg Berry
-	MF	(England) ENG	Ian Bogie
-	DF	(Wales) WAL	Gavin Maguire
-	GK	(England) ENG	Tim Carter
-	MF	(England) ENG	Paul Holsgrove
-	DF	(Republic of Ireland) IRL	Tony McCarthy
-	FW	(Republic of Ireland) IRL	John Byrne
-	FW	(England) ENG	Lee Luscombe
-	MF	(England) ENG	Andy May
-	FW	(England) ENG	Warren Patmore
-	DF	(England) ENG	Mike Harle
-	MF	(England) ENG	Geoff Pitcher
-	MF	(England) ENG	Jermaine Wright
