= Ian Bogie =

Footballer; football manager (born 1967)

Personal information
- Full name: Ian Bogie
- Date of birth: 6 December 1967 (age 58)
- Place of birth: Newcastle upon Tyne, England
- Height: 5 ft 7 in (1.70 m)
- Position: Midfielder

Youth career
- 1977–1984: Wallsend Boys Club
- 1984–1985: Newcastle United

Senior career*
Years	Team	Apps	(Gls)
1985–1989	Newcastle United	14	(0)
1989–1991	Preston North End	79	(12)
1991–1993	Millwall	51	(1)
1993–1995	Leyton Orient	65	(5)
1995–2000	Port Vale	154	(9)
2000–2001	Kidderminster Harriers	21	(1)
2001–2004	Bedlington Terriers		
2006–2007	Gateshead	0	(0)
Total		384	(28)

Managerial career
- 2007–2012: Gateshead
- 2013: Stockport County
- * Club domestic league appearances and goals

Ian Bogie (born 6 December 1967) is a former professional footballer, and former manager of Gateshead and Stockport County. He spent two decades as a professional player; from 1985 until 2001, he played in the English Football League, where he made 382 appearances.

He started at Newcastle United in the mid-1980s, he signed with Preston North End in 1989, moving on to Millwall two years later. In 1993, he joined Leyton Orient, and after another two years, moved on to Port Vale, where he saw out the century. A legend at Vale, he made over 150 appearances. He then had spells at Kidderminster Harriers, Bedlington Terriers and finally Gateshead.

He moved into management once his playing career had finished, taking up the reins at Gateshead in 2007. He guided the club to two successive promotions via the play-offs in 2008 and 2009 to take them from the Northern Premier League to the Conference National, before he was sacked in December 2012. He was appointed manager of Stockport County in March 2013 and could not save the club from relegation out of the Conference.

== Playing career ==
=== Newcastle United ===
Having developed his skills at the Wallsend Boys Club, Bogie signed for his hometown club Newcastle United as an apprentice in July 1984, turning pro in December 1985 just after his 18th birthday. A skillful, ball playing midfielder in the Paul Gascoigne mould he was favourite to take over from the Tottenham bound England star in the Newcastle team. However, after only 21 games for the Toon Army in which he scored one goal, manager Jim Smith's traded him to Preston North End in exchange for striker Gary Brazil; Smith valued him at £100,000 mark. Bogie was originally against the move, preferring to stay and fight for his place, but after much persuasion by both Smith and Preston boss John McGrath, he finally moved to Deepdale.

=== Preston North End ===
Having finally joined Preston, Bogie debuted in a home league match versus Bristol Rovers, a game that ended 1–1. Bogie did, however, endear himself to the Preston fans immediately with his silky ball-playing skills. His time at Deepdale was frustrating for Bogie, Preston, and the fans, with the club beginning to struggle. Bogie himself frustrated the fans with some indifferent performances despite his obvious ability. After two and a half years at Preston in which he played 91 games, scoring 12 goals, Bogie exercised his right to speak to other clubs at the end of his contract and in August 1991 signed for Millwall for a tribunal set fee of £145,000.

=== Millwall and Orient ===
His time at Millwall was much the same as at Preston, with Bogie frustrating the fans despite his obvious talent, bordering at times on the sublime to being completely ineffective. In just over two years at The Den, Bogie played 57 games, scoring just 1 goal before being sold to Leyton Orient for £75,000 in October 1993.

Bogie was by now regularly putting in some excellent performances, and he rarely missed a game. He was voted by his fellow professionals in the Team of the Year at the annual PFA awards and was voted Orient Player of the Year as well as scoring goal of the season. After 78 games and 5 goals, Bogie was sold to Port Vale in March 1995 for £50,000 after Orient encountered financial problems.

=== Port Vale ===
At Vale Park, Bogie began putting in the sort of consistent match-winning displays that had evaded him until this time. A favourite with the Vale fans, he was a member of the giant-killing Vale team that knocked Everton out of the FA Cup in 1996 and reached the final of the Anglo-Italian Cup at Wembley, eventually losing out to Genoa. He scored twice against Everton, a late equaliser in the original tie at Goodison Park and then once again in the replay. His cult status was elevated further by his penchant for scoring winning goals against local rivals Stoke City. In a 1–0 victory at Vale Park in 1996, Bogie silenced the Stoke City following with a winning goal just 12 seconds after the kick-off. This would be the quickest goal ever scored by a Port Vale player and was described by Bogie as "one of my best-ever goals." He played in the 1996 Anglo-Italian Cup final, as Vale lost 5–2 to Genoa. In five years at Vale Park, Bogie played 181 games in all competitions scoring 12 goals, before being handed a free transfer in April 2000 and signing a two-year contract with Conference National champions Kidderminster Harriers in August of that year. He later described his spell at Vale Park as "the best time of my career."

=== Kidderminster and home ===
Bogie's time at Aggborough was short-lived, with him playing just 28 games in seven months before his contract was terminated by mutual consent after he picked up a back injury in March 2001. He chose to return to his native North East and to Northern League side Bedlington Terriers where he took on the role of player-coach. Bedlington were crowned champions in 2001–02 and finished as runners-up in 2002–03. He stayed with Bedlington until hanging up his boots at the end of the 2003–04 season when he then took over as manager of Northern Football Alliance Premier League club Walker Central. Bogie stayed there until the summer of 2006 when he left to take on the role of assistant manager of Northern Premier League side Gateshead.

== Management career ==
=== Gateshead ===
Bogie was confirmed as the new Gateshead manager on 4 May 2007. He initially joined Gateshead as assistant manager at the start of the 2006–07 season. He took charge in a caretaker role after Tony Lee was sacked at the beginning of March. Gateshead ended the season with a 12 match unbeaten run, with Bogie as assistant to Derek Bell for the first three and caretaker manager for the final nine of these games. This put Bogie and his players in a final position of ninth in the Northern Premier League Premier Division.

In his first full season, Bogie guided the Gateshead team to third in the NPL during the 2007–08 season, which meant the team qualified for the play-offs. On 3 May 2008, Gateshead beat Buxton 2–0 and therefore were promoted to the Conference North. In the 2008–09 season he guided them to a second-successive promotion with a second-place finish in the Conference North, beating favourites AFC Telford United 1–0 in the play-off final, picking up the January manager of the month award along the way with his side playing some outstanding football during the campaign.

He picked out a gem of a player in Lee Novak for a fee of £3,500 from Newcastle Blue Star. Novak won the Golden Boot Award and was bought by League One side Huddersfield Town for a fee that has brought Gateshead a North East non-League record fee of £150,000. His team retained their Conference National status in 2009–10, finishing above the relegation zone on goal difference (though this was later made into a two-point gap after Salisbury City were expelled from the division). On 28 April 2010, Bogie signed a new two-year contract, making him Gateshead's first full-time manager in over half a century. Under his charge the "Tynesiders" posted a 14th-place finish in 2010–11, reaching the semi-final of the FA Trophy and winning the Durham Challenge Cup. Gateshead pushed on again in 2011–12, flirting around the play-off spots all season before finishing in eighth position; they also reached the FA Cup second round and the quarter-finals of the FA Trophy. He signed a one-year extension to his contract in May 2012. He then lost top-scorer Jon Shaw to Luton Town, and attempted to replace him with former Hartlepool United stalwart James Brown. He further signed defender Glenn Wilson, goalkeeper Adam Bartlett, attacker Ryan Donaldson, and defender Chris Bush. However, after opening the 2012–13 season with six leagues without defeat, Gateshead struggled with poor form. On 10 December 2012, Bogie and assistant Terry Mitchell were relieved of their duties at the club.

"A highly popular and respected figure on Tyneside, Ian Bogie leaves having helped transform Gateshead from part-time also-rans to a professional club with genuine aspirations of returning to the Football League. Despite their variable form over the past few months, this will have been a tough call for chairman Graham Wood – a lifelong Gateshead supporter – who is the first to acknowledge Bogie's achievements but wants the club to be competing at the top of the table.

— Analysis from Matthew Raisbeck of BBC Newcastle.

=== Stockport County ===
Bogie was announced as manager of Stockport County in March 2013, with the club sitting two points above the Conference National relegation places. This came only two months after he was interviewed for the position, but lost out to Darije Kalezić. He had been considered the best experienced choice for the position, whilst Kalezić had not previously worked in England; Bogie had rejected the offer of becoming Kalezić's assistant. His first game in charge was a 1–0 win at Edgeley Park over fourth-placed Newport County. Despite picking up eight points in their remaining seven fixtures they were relegated at the end of the 2012–13 season.

Despite a positive string of results in pre-season friendlies, Bogie resigned from his post on 31 August 2013 after a 3–1 defeat to Harrogate Town which left the "Hatters" with just one point from their first five matches.

=== Coaching ===
By September 2019, he was coaching the under-16 team at Newcastle United.

== Personal life ==
He married Kim and had three children. His hobbies include stamp collecting and trainspotting.

== Career statistics ==
=== Playing statistics ===
Appearances and goals by club, season and competition
Club	Season	League			FA Cup		Other		Total	
Club	Season	Division	Apps	Goals	Apps	Goals	Apps	Goals	Apps	Goals
Newcastle United	1986–87	First Division	1	0	0	0	0	0	1	0
Newcastle United	1987–88	First Division	7	0	0	0	2	1	9	1
Newcastle United	1988–89	First Division	6	0	3	0	2	0	11	0
Newcastle United	Total		14	0	3	0	4	1	21	1
Preston North End	1988–89	Third Division	13	1	0	0	0	0	13	1
Preston North End	1989–90	Third Division	35	3	2	0	5	0	42	3
Preston North End	1990–91	Third Division	31	8	1	0	4	0	36	8
Preston North End	Total		79	12	3	0	9	0	91	12
Millwall	1991–92	Second Division	25	0	1	0	2	0	28	0
Millwall	1992–93	First Division	22	0	1	0	2	0	25	0
Millwall	1993–94	First Division	4	1	0	0	0	0	4	1
Millwall	Total		51	1	2	0	4	0	57	1
Leyton Orient	1993–94	Second Division	34	3	0	0	3	0	37	3
Leyton Orient	1994–95	Second Division	31	2	2	0	8	0	41	2
Leyton Orient	Total		65	5	2	0	11	0	78	5
Port Vale	1994–95	First Division	9	2	0	0	0	0	9	2
Port Vale	1995–96	First Division	32	3	6	2	10	0	48	5
Port Vale	1996–97	First Division	31	1	1	0	4	1	36	2
Port Vale	1997–98	First Division	38	1	2	0	1	0	41	1
Port Vale	1998–99	First Division	35	2	1	0	2	0	38	2
Port Vale	1999–2000	First Division	9	0	0	0	0	0	9	0
Port Vale	Total		154	9	10	2	17	1	181	12
Kidderminster Harriers	2000–01	Third Division	21	1	3	1	4	0	28	2
Career total			384	28	23	3	49	2	456	33

=== Managerial statistics ===
Managerial record by team and tenure
Team	From	To	Record				
Team	From	To	G	W	D	L	Win %
Gateshead	21 March 2007	10 December 2012	303	142	69	92	46.86
Stockport County	20 March 2013	31 August 2013	10	1	2	7	10.00
Total			313	143	71	99	45.69

As of 21 April 2013.

== Honours ==
=== Player ===
Individual

- PFA Second Division Team of the Year: 1993–94

Newcastle

- FA Youth Cup: 1985

Port Vale

- Anglo-Italian Cup runner-up: 1996

Bedlington Terriers

- Northern League Division One: 2001–02

=== Manager ===
Individual

- Conference North Manager of the Month Award: January 2009
- Conference National Manager of the Month Award: February 2011

Gateshead

- Northern Premier League Premier Division play-offs: 2007–08
- Conference North play-offs: 2008–09
