= Darren Treacy =

Darren Treacy may refer to:

- Darren Treacy (rugby league) (born 1971), Australian former rugby league footballer
- Darren Treacy (footballer) (born 1970), English former footballer
