= Mark Kennedy (footballer, born 1976) =

Irish footballer and coach

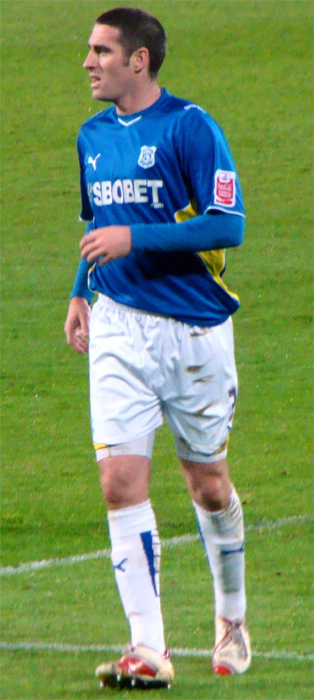
- Kennedy in 2010

Personal information
- Full name: Mark John Kennedy
- Date of birth: 15 May 1976 (age 50)
- Place of birth: Dublin, Ireland
- Positions: Left back; left winger

Youth career
- St.Mochta's
- –1992: Belvedere

Senior career*
Years	Team	Apps	(Gls)
1992–1995	Millwall	43	(9)
1995–1998	Liverpool	16	(0)
1998	→ Queens Park Rangers (loan)	8	(2)
1998–1999	Wimbledon	21	(0)
1999–2001	Manchester City	66	(8)
2001–2006	Wolverhampton Wanderers	167	(12)
2006–2008	Crystal Palace	46	(1)
2008–2010	Cardiff City	66	(0)
2010–2012	Ipswich Town	33	(0)
Total		466	(32)

International career
1992	Republic of Ireland U17	1	(0)
1994–1996	Republic of Ireland U21	4	(4)
1995–2002	Republic of Ireland	34	(4)

Managerial career
- 2020: Macclesfield Town
- 2022–2023: Lincoln City
- 2024: Swindon Town
- * Club domestic league appearances and goals

Mark John Kennedy (born 15 May 1976) is an Irish football coach and former professional footballer who was most recently the U21 professional phase coach of Birmingham City.

As a player, he was a left back and left winger from 1992 to 2012. He notably featured in the Premier League with Liverpool, Wimbledon, Manchester City and Wolverhampton Wanderers, as well as in the Football League for Millwall, Queens Park Rangers, Crystal Palace, Cardiff City and Ipswich Town. He was capped 34 times by Ireland, scoring four goals.

Kennedy was head coach of Macclesfield Town in 2020, and was appointed assistant to head coach Lee Bowyer at Birmingham City in June 2021. Prior to this he has worked as a coach at Ipswich Town, Manchester City and Colchester United.

== Club career ==
=== Millwall ===
Kennedy was born in Clonsilla, Dublin. He began his professional career at Millwall, joining the club from Belvedere F.C. aged 16. Kennedy made his senior debut on 24 April 1993 in a 1–0 win over Charlton, while still only 16. He developed over his three-year stay at The Old Den, and broke into the Republic of Ireland Under-21 side. He particularly gained attention for a powerful run and goal at Highbury that helped eliminate Arsenal from the FA Cup in 1995.

=== Liverpool ===
Kennedy left to join Liverpool in March 1995 for an initial £1.5 million fee (potentially rising to £2.3 m), making him then the most expensive teenage footballer in British history. However, opportunities at Anfield were scarce, and he managed just 18 appearances over three seasons, which also saw him loaned to Queens Park Rangers to gain first team action. He found a permanent route to regular football when he moved back to the capital with Wimbledon in 1998, for £1.75 million, but he stayed for just one season with the club, scoring once against Bolton in the League Cup, before returning to the north, this time to Manchester City, for £1.6 million, in 1999.

=== Manchester City ===
Kennedy won promotion to the Premier League with Manchester City in his first season, but the following year saw the club relegated and manager Joe Royle sacked. When Kevin Keegan took the reins, he sought to rebuild the squad and decided Kennedy was not part of his plans, selling him to fellow second flight club Wolverhampton Wanderers for £2 million.

=== Wolverhampton Wanderers ===
Kennedy looked set for another promotion in his first season at Molineux, but a groin tear ruled him out of the run-in and the team dropped into the play-off zone in his absence, where they lost to Norwich. However, the following season saw them achieve the aim of promotion, with Kennedy scoring the opening goal in their 3–0 Division One Play-off final win over Sheffield United. The Midlands club were unable to remain in the top flight beyond a solitary season though, and soon found themselves with a new manager, with Glenn Hoddle replacing Dave Jones, in late 2004. Hoddle preferred to play Kennedy in a more restrained left midfield role, rather than his original position on the wing. With Hoddle departing in Summer 2006, so did Kennedy, after refusing the terms of a reduced contract, he moved to Selhurst Park on a free transfer to play under new manager Peter Taylor at Crystal Palace.

=== Crystal Palace ===
Kennedy spent the majority of the 2006–07 season in Palace's first team line-up, but largely disappointed fans, despite scoring against Derby County. Early in the following season Taylor was replaced by Neil Warnock, and Kennedy hardly featured for the Eagles after that, before being released at the end of that campaign.

=== Cardiff City ===
Kennedy was signed by his former Wolves manager Dave Jones at Cardiff City on 10 July 2008. With club stalwart Joe Ledley cemented in the left midfield role, Kennedy started the season at left-back in place of the injured Tony Capaldi but an injury to Kennedy himself meant he missed around half of the opening two months. However following his return, he remained as first choice left back for the majority of the season. The following season, he started the opening game of the season but injury meant he did not feature again until September during a 1–0 loss to Newcastle United where he remained on the bench, but he started the next game at Reading. He made his 400th career club start against Sheffield Wednesday on 26 September 2009. He made his 50th league Cardiff appearance on 5 December 2009, coming on as a substitute for injured Anthony Gerrard in a 1–0 win over Preston North End.

=== Ipswich Town ===
On 27 July 2010, Kennedy joined Ipswich Town, managed by his former international team-mate Roy Keane, for a fee of £75,000. He made his debut for Ipswich in a 3–1 away win over Middlesbrough on 7 August. He made 30 appearances during his first season at the club as Ipswich finished 13th in the Championship, while also helping the club to reach the semi-finals of the League Cup, starting in both legs as Ipswich lost 1–3 on aggregate following a 1–0 home win over Arsenal in the first leg at Portman Road.

Kennedy featured less frequently during the following season, making only 7 appearances before retiring at the end of the 2011–12 season and joining the Ipswich Town coaching staff.

== International career ==
Kennedy has 34 caps for the Republic of Ireland, scoring four times. He made his international debut on 6 September 1995 in a 3–1 defeat in Austria, but never established himself as a regular player over seven years involved with the national side. During this time, Ireland did not play in the final tournaments of the World Cup or the European Championship. While on international duty, Kennedy was arrested in Dublin with teammate Phil Babb in August 2000 for public order offences and causing criminal damage to an off duty Garda officer's car. This effectively ended his international career. Kennedy's final game for Ireland was a friendly in February 2002: he missed the 2002 FIFA World Cup Finals because of injury.

== Managerial career ==
Following his retirement from playing, Kennedy began coaching with the Ipswich Town academy in 2012. He was appointed as the club's under-21's head coach in 2012. He managed the Ipswich under-21 side from 2012 to 2016 before leaving to take up a position coaching in Manchester City's academy. Kennedy was a coach with Manchester City from 2016 to 2018, before being released as part of a restructuring process within Manchester City's academy. He also spent time coaching with Wolves' under-23 side in 2019.

In January 2020, Kennedy was appointed head coach at Macclesfield Town, He took charge of his first match in senior management away to Colchester United on 18 January. Kennedy managed just 12 first-team games in a COVID-19 pandemic-shortened season, resigning on 12 August 2020 after rejecting the offer of a new contract following the club's relegation to the National League as a result of a points deduction for financial issues.

In December 2020, Kennedy returned to the Ipswich Town academy to shadow the club's head of coaching and player development Bryan Klug in his role to gain more coaching experience.

He was appointed assistant to head coach Lee Bowyer at Championship club Birmingham City in June 2021, and left on 12 May 2022.

The same day, he was appointed the head coach of EFL League One club Lincoln City on a four-year contract. His first game in charge was a 1–1 draw at home to Exeter City on the opening day of the 2022–23 season.

On 18 October 2023, he was dismissed by Lincoln City along with assistant manager Danny Butterfield.

On May 29 2024 Kennedy was announced as the new head coach of Swindon Town on a 2-year contract. After five months in charge, on 25 October he was sacked by a late night phone call.

On 10 June 2025, Kennedy returned to Birmingham City as their Under-21s Professional Phase Coach. On 12 February 2026, he left the club following personal reasons.

== Personal life ==
His brother Brendan was also a footballer, playing in the League of Ireland. Brendan is the Ireland under-18s and 19s goalkeeper coach and manager of Dunboyne AFC in the Leinster Senior League.

== Career statistics ==
=== Club ===
Appearances and goals by club, season and competition
Club	Season	League			FA Cup		League Cup		Other		Total	
Club	Season	Division	Apps	Goals	Apps	Goals	Apps	Goals	Apps	Goals	Apps	Goals
Millwall	1992–93	First Division	1	0	0	0	0	0	—		1	0
Millwall	1993–94	First Division	12	4	0	0	2	0	0	0	12	4
Millwall	1994–95	First Division	30	5	4	1	5	2	—		52	8
Millwall	Total		43	9	4	1	7	2	0	0	0	0
Liverpool	1994–95	Premier League	6	0	0	0	0	0	—		6	0
Liverpool	1995–96	Premier League	4	0	0	0	1	0	1 (Note: Appearance in UEFA Cup)	0	6	0
Liverpool	1996–97	Premier League	5	0	1	0	1	0	1 (Note: Appearance in UEFA Cup Winners' Cup)	0	8	0
Liverpool	1997–98	Premier League	1	0	0	0	0	0	0	0	1	0
Liverpool	Total		16	0	1	0	2	0	2	0	21	0
Queens Park Rangers (loan)	1997–98	First Division	8	2	0	0	0	0	—		8	2
Wimbledon	1997–98	Premier League	4	0	0	0	0	0	—		4	0
Wimbledon	1998–99	Premier League	17	0	2	0	5	1	—		24	1
Wimbledon	Total		21	0	2	0	5	1	0	0	28	1
Manchester City	1999–00	First Division	41	8	2	0	4	2	—		47	10
Manchester City	2000–01	Premier League	25	0	0	0	5	1	—		30	1
Manchester City	Total		66	8	2	0	9	3	0	0	77	11
Wolverhampton Wanderers	2001–02	First Division	35	5	1	0	1	0	1 (Note: Appearance(s) in First Division play-offs)	0	38	5
Wolverhampton Wanderers	2002–03	First Division	31	3	4	1	0	0	3	1	38	5
Wolverhampton Wanderers	2003–04	Premier League	31	2	3	0	2	0	—		36	2
Wolverhampton Wanderers	2004–05	Championship	30	0	2	0	0	0	—		32	0
Wolverhampton Wanderers	2005–06	Championship	40	2	2	0	1	0	—		43	2
Wolverhampton Wanderers	Total		167	12	12	1	4	0	4	1	187	14
Crystal Palace	2006–07	Championship	38	1	2	0	0	0	—		40	1
Crystal Palace	2007–08	Championship	8	0	0	0	0	0	0	0	8	0
Crystal Palace	Total		46	1	2	0	0	0	0	0	48	1
Cardiff City	2008–09	Championship	36	0	3	0	1	0	—		40	0
Cardiff City	2009–10	Championship	30	0	3	0	0	0	3 (Note: Appearances in Championship play-offs)	0	36	0
Cardiff City	Total		66	0	6	0	1	0	3	0	76	0
Ipswich Town	2010–11	Championship	26	0	1	0	3	0	—		30	0
Ipswich Town	2011–12	Championship	7	0	0	0	0	0	—		7	0
Ipswich Town	Total		33	0	1	0	3	0	0	0	37	0
Career total			466	32	30	2	31	6	9	1	536	41

=== International ===
Appearances and goals by national team and year
National team	Year	Apps	Goals
Republic of Ireland	1995	3	0
Republic of Ireland	1996	7	0
Republic of Ireland	1997	7	1
Republic of Ireland	1998	2	0
Republic of Ireland	1999	6	2
Republic of Ireland	2000	5	1
Republic of Ireland	2001	3	0
Republic of Ireland	2002	1	0
Total		34	4

Scores and results list Republic of Ireland's goal tally first, score column indicates score after each Kennedy goal.

List of international goals scored by Mark Kennedy
No.	Date	Venue	Opponent	Score	Result	Competition
1	6 September 1997	Laugardalsvöllur, Reykjavík, Iceland	Iceland	4–2	4–2	1998 FIFA World Cup qualification
2	28 April 1999	Lansdowne Road, Dublin, Ireland	Sweden	2–0	2–0	Friendly
3	1 September 1999	Lansdowne Road, Dublin, Ireland	FR Yugoslavia	2–1	2–1	UEFA Euro 2000 qualification
4	30 May 2000	Lansdowne Road, Dublin, Ireland	Scotland	1–1	1–2	Friendly

== Managerial statistics ==
As of match played 22 October 2024

Managerial record by team and tenure
Team	From	To	Record				
Team	From	To	P	W	D	L	Win %
Macclesfield Town	16 January 2020	12 August 2020	12	1	3	8	8.3
Lincoln City	12 May 2022	18 October 2023	73	25	27	21	34.2
Swindon Town	29 May 2024	25 October 2024	16	3	5	8	18.8
Total			101	29	35	37	28.7

== Honours ==
Manchester City

- Football League First Division runner-up: 1999–2000

Wolverhampton Wanderers

- Football League First Division play-offs: 2003

Individual

- PFA Team of the Year: 1999–2000 First Division, 2001–02 First Division
