= Darren Morgan (disambiguation) =

Darren Morgan is a Welsh snooker player.

Darren Morgan may also refer to:

- Darren Morgan (Australian footballer) (born 1965), former VFL/AFL player
- Darren Morgan (footballer, born 1967), English football player
- Darren Morgan (boxer) (born 1976), British boxer
