= Paul Robinson (footballer, born 1963) =

English footballer

Personal information
- Date of birth: 5 January 1963 (age 63)
- Place of birth: Hampstead, England
- Position: Left back

Senior career*
Years	Team	Apps	(Gls)
1979–1984	Millwall	59	(2)

International career
1978	England Schoolboys	7	(0)
1979	England Youth	2	(0)
- * Club domestic league appearances and goals

Paul Robinson (born 5 January 1963) is an English former professional footballer who played in the Football League as a left back. His career was cut short after sustaining a broken leg in a pre-season match in a tackle by Colchester's Roger Osborne, scorer of the FA Cup final winning goal for Ipswich in 1978.

== Honours ==
Millwall

- Football League Group Cup: 1982–83

== Sources ==
- Paul Robinson, Neil Brown
- Paul Robinson breaks leg in pre-season match
