= 2000–01 Rayo Vallecano season =

Rayo Vallecano
2000–01 season
- Manager: Juande Ramos
- La Liga: 14th
- Copa del Rey: Round of 16
- UEFA Cup: Quarter-finals

The 2000–01 season was the 77th season in the history of Rayo Vallecano and the club's second consecutive season in the top flight of Spanish football. In addition to the domestic league, Rayo Vallecano participated in this season's edition of the Copa del Rey and UEFA Cup.

== Season summary ==
Rayo Vallecano reached the quarter-finals of the UEFA Cup.

== Squad ==
Squad at end of season

Note: Flags indicate national team as defined under FIFA eligibility rules; some limited exceptions apply. Players may hold more than one non-FIFA nationality.

No.	Pos.	Nation	Player
1	GK	USA	Kasey Keller
2	DF	ESP	Jesús Diego Cota
3	DF	ESP	Mingo
4	DF	ESP	Ramón de Quintana
5	DF	ESP	Urbano Santos
6	DF	ESP	Ángel Luis Alcázar
7	MF	ESP	Iván Iglesias
8	MF	ESP	Míchel (captain)
9	MF	ESP	José María Quevedo
10	FW	ARG	Gustavo Bartelt (on loan from Roma)
11	FW	BIH	Elvir Bolić
12	DF	ESP	David Clotet
13	GK	ESP	Julen Lopetegui
14	MF	ESP	Luis Cembranos

No.	Pos.	Nation	Player
15	DF	ESP	Patxi Ferreira
16	MF	BRA	Gláucio
18	DF	ESP	Sergio Ballesteros
19	MF	ESP	Mauro García
20	MF	GER	Gerhard Poschner
21	FW	ESP	Bolo
22	DF	ESP	Pablo Sanz
23	MF	ESP	Josep Setvalls
24	MF	POR	Hélder Baptista
25	GK	ESP	Sergio Segura
26	DF	ESP	Iván Romero
27	MF	ESP	Dani Bouzas
28	DF	ESP	Pedro Hontecillas
29	MF	ESP	Dupi

== Competitions ==
=== La Liga ===
==== League table ====
Pos	Team	Pld	W	D	L	GF	GA	GD	Pts
12	Athletic Bilbao	38	11	10	17	44	60	−16	43 (Note: ATH: 9 pts; RSO: 6 pts; RVA: 3 pts)
13	Real Sociedad	38	11	10	17	52	68	−16	43
14	Rayo Vallecano	38	10	13	15	56	68	−12	43
15	Osasuna	38	10	12	16	43	54	−11	42 (Note: OSA: 7 pts; VLD: 5 pts; ZAR: 4 pts)
16	Valladolid	38	9	15	14	42	50	−8	42

Source: LFP
Rules for classification: 1st points; 2nd head-to-head points; 3rd head-to-head goal difference; 4th head-to-head goals scored; 5th goal difference; 6th number of goals scored; 7th Fair-play points

=== UEFA Cup ===
==== Quarter-finals ====
8 March 2001	Deportivo Alavés (Spain)	3–0	(Spain) Rayo Vallecano	Vitoria-Gasteiz, Spain
	Azkoitia 30'; Eggen 79'; Vučko 80'	[ Report]		Stadium: Mendizorrotza Stadium

15 March 2001	Rayo Vallecano (Spain)	2–1	(Spain) Deportivo Alavés	Madrid, Spain
	Quevedo 41'; Cembranos 80'		Cruyff 19'

== See also ==
- Rayo Vallecano
- 2000–01 La Liga
- Copa del Rey
