= 1982–83 Football League Trophy =

Tournament details
- Country: England; Wales
- Dates: 13 August 1982 – 20 April 1983
- Teams: 32

Final positions
- Champions: Millwall (1st title)
- Runners-up: Lincoln City
- Third place: Reading
- Fourth place: Chester City

Tournament statistics
- Matches played: 55
- Goals scored: 183 (3.33 per match)

The 1982–83 Football League Trophy was the second edition of the Football League Group Cup, which had been renamed the Football League Trophy. It was won by Millwall, who beat Lincoln City 3–1 in the final at Sincil Bank. Next season the tournament would be reconstituted as the Associate Members' Cup which runs as the EFL Trophy today.

== First round ==
=== Group A ===
Home team	Result	Away team	Date
Colchester United	3–1	Southend United	13 August 1982
Watford	4–1	Orient	14 August 1982
Southend United	1–1	Orient	16 August 1982
Watford	2–1	Colchester United	17 August 1982
Orient	0–2	Colchester United	21 August 1982
Southend United	1–4	Watford	21 August 1982

Team	Pld	W	D	L	GF	GA	GD	BP	Pts
Watford	3	3	0	0	10	3	+7	2	11
Colchester United	3	2	0	1	6	3	+3	1	7
Southend United	3	0	1	2	3	8	−5	0	1
Orient	3	0	1	2	2	7	−5	0	1

=== Group B ===
Home team	Result	Away team	Date
Shrewsbury Town	1–1	Tranmere Rovers	13 August 1982
Chesterfield	1–1	Chester	14 August 1982
Chesterfield	1–0	Shrewsbury Town	17 August 1982
Tranmere Rovers	2–1	Chester	18 August 1982
Chester	5–0	Shrewsbury Town	21 August 1982
Tranmere Rovers	1–1	Chesterfield	21 August 1982

Team	Pld	W	D	L	GF	GA	GD	BP	Pts
Chester	3	1	1	1	7	3	+4	1	5
Tranmere Rovers	3	1	2	0	4	3	+1	0	5
Chesterfield	3	1	2	0	3	2	+1	0	5
Shrewsbury Town	3	0	1	2	1	7	−6	0	1

=== Group C ===
Home team	Result	Away team	Date
AFC Bournemouth	2–2	Aldershot	14 August 1982
Reading	2–1	Oxford United	14 August 1982
Aldershot	1–3	Oxford United	17 August 1982
Reading	4–2	AFC Bournemouth	18 August 1982
Aldershot	3–3	Reading	21 August 1982
AFC Bournemouth	3–0	Oxford United	21 August 1982

Team	Pld	W	D	L	GF	GA	GD	BP	Pts
Reading	3	2	1	0	9	6	+3	2	9
AFC Bournemouth	3	1	1	1	7	6	+1	1	5
Oxford United	3	1	0	2	4	6	−2	1	4
Aldershot	3	0	2	1	6	8	−2	1	3

=== Group D ===
Home team	Result	Away team	Date
Bradford City	1–0	Halifax Town	14 August 1982
Hartlepool United	1–2	Hull City	14 August 1982
Halifax Town	1–0	Hull City	17 August 1982
Hartlepool United	0–4	Bradford City	18 August 1982
Halifax Town	3–0	Hartlepool United	21 August 1982
Hull City	0–0	Bradford City	21 August 1982

Team	Pld	W	D	L	GF	GA	GD	BP	Pts
Bradford City	3	2	1	0	5	0	+5	1	8
Halifax Town	3	2	0	1	4	1	+3	1	7
Hull City	3	1	1	1	2	2	0	0	4
Hartlepool United	3	0	0	3	1	9	−8	0	0

=== Group E ===
Home team	Result	Away team	Date
Brentford	2–2	Crystal Palace	14 August 1982
Millwall	0–1	Wimbledon	14 August 1982
Crystal Palace	1–0	Wimbledon	17 August 1982
Millwall	3–0	Brentford	17 August 1982
Crystal Palace	0–3	Millwall	21 August 1982
Wimbledon	1–3	Brentford	21 August 1982

Team	Pld	W	D	L	GF	GA	GD	BP	Pts
Millwall	3	2	0	1	6	1	+5	2	8
Brentford	3	1	1	1	5	6	−1	1	5
Crystal Palace	3	1	1	1	3	5	−2	0	4
Wimbledon	3	1	0	2	2	4	−2	0	3

=== Group F ===
Home team	Result	Away team	Date
Exeter City	2–1	Bristol City	14 August 1982
Newport County	0–1	Torquay United	14 August 1982
Bristol City	1–0	Torquay United	17 August 1982
Newport County	5–1	Exeter City	18 August 1982
Bristol City	1–4	Newport County	21 August 1982
Torquay United	3–2	Exeter City	21 August 1982

Team	Pld	W	D	L	GF	GA	GD	BP	Pts
Newport County	3	2	0	1	9	3	+6	2	8
Torquay United	3	2	0	1	4	3	+1	1	7
Exeter City	3	1	0	2	5	9	−4	0	3
Bristol City	3	1	0	2	3	6	−3	0	3

=== Group G ===
Home team	Result	Away team	Date
Norwich City	3–0	Northampton Town	14 August 1982
Peterborough United	4–1	Mansfield Town	14 August 1982
Mansfield Town	1–2	Northampton Town	16 August 1982
Norwich City	6–2	Peterborough United	18 August 1982
Mansfield Town	1–3	Norwich City	21 August 1982
Peterborough United	5–2	Northampton Town	21 August 1982

Team	Pld	W	D	L	GF	GA	GD	BP	Pts
Norwich City	3	3	0	0	12	3	+9	3	12
Peterborough United	3	2	0	1	11	9	+2	2	8
Northampton Town	3	1	0	2	4	9	−5	0	3
Mansfield Town	3	0	0	3	3	9	−6	0	0

=== Group H ===
Home team	Result	Away team	Date
Scunthorpe United	1–1	Lincoln City	14 August 1982
Sheffield United	1–3	Grimsby Town	14 August 1982
Scunthorpe United	0–0	Sheffield United	17 August 1982
Lincoln City	2–0	Grimsby Town	18 August 1982
Grimsby Town	2–0	Scunthorpe United	21 August 1982
Lincoln City	3–1	Sheffield United	21 August 1982

Team	Pld	W	D	L	GF	GA	GD	BP	Pts
Lincoln City	3	2	1	0	6	3	+3	1	8
Grimsby Town	3	2	0	1	6	3	+3	1	7
Scunthorpe United	3	0	2	1	1	3	−2	0	2
Sheffield United	3	0	1	2	2	6	−4	0	1

== Quarter-finals ==
Home team	Result	Away team	Date
Millwall	1–1 (aet) (Note: Millwall won 4-2 on penalties)	Bradford City	6 December 1982
Lincoln City	3–1	Norwich City	8 December 1982
Reading	5–3	Watford	8 December 1982
Chester	0–0 (aet) (Note: Chester won 5-4 on penalties)	Newport County	26 January 1983

== Semi-finals ==
Home team	Result	Away team	Date	Attendance
Reading	1–3	Millwall	26 January 1983	2,658
Chester	1–3 (aet)	Lincoln City	8 February 1983	1,058

== Final ==
20 April 1983
19:30 BST

Lincoln City	2–3	Millwall
Burke 32', 77'		Neal 47', 71'; McLeary 59'

Sincil Bank, Lincoln
Attendance: 3,142

=== Millwall line-up ===
Note: Flags indicate national team as defined under FIFA eligibility rules; some limited exceptions apply. Players may hold more than one non-FIFA nationality.

No.	Pos.	Nation	Player
1	GK	ENG	Paul Sansome
2	DF	ENG	Keith Stevens
3	DF	ENG	David Stride
4	MF	ENG	Lawrie Madden
5	DF	ENG	Sam Allardyce
6	DF	ENG	Paul Roberts
7	MF	ENG	Andy Massey
8	FW	ENG	Dean Neal
9	FW	ENG	David Martin
10	MF	ENG	Paul Robinson
11	MF	ENG	Alan McLeary
sub	FW	ENG	Teddy Sheringham
sub	DF	ENG	Nicky Coleman
sub	FW	ENG	Roger Wynter
sub	MF	IRL	John Neal
sub	GK	ENG	Tony Ashby
