= David Thompson (footballer, born 1968) =

English footballer

Personal information
- Full name: David George Thompson
- Date of birth: 20 November 1968 (age 57)
- Place of birth: Ashington, England
- Height: 1.85 m (6 ft 1 in)
- Position: Central defender

Youth career
- –1986: Millwall

Senior career*
Years	Team	Apps	(Gls)
1986–1992	Millwall	97	(6)
1992–1994	Bristol City	17	(1)
1994	Brentford	10	(1)
1994–1995	Blackpool	17	(0)
1995–1997	Cambridge United	46	(4)
1998	Yeovil Town	1	(0)
1998	Cambridge City	24	(0)
Total		188	(12)
- * Club domestic league appearances and goals

David George Thompson (born 20 November 1968 in Ashington) is an English former professional footballer who played in the Football League for Millwall, Cambridge United, Bristol City, Blackpool and Brentford as a central defender.

== Career statistics ==
Appearances and goals by club, season and competition
Club	Season	League			FA Cup		League Cup		Other		Total	
Club	Season	Division	Apps	Goals	Apps	Goals	Apps	Goals	Apps	Goals	Apps	Goals
Millwall	1987–88	Second Division	5	0	0	0	0	0	0	0	5	0
Millwall	1988–89	First Division	15	1	1	0	1	0	2 (Note: Appearances in Full Members' Cup)	0	19	1
Millwall	1989–90	First Division	27	0	1	0	2	0	1	0	31	0
Millwall	1990–91	Second Division	19	3	0	0	0	0	0	0	19	3
Millwall	1991–92	Second Division	33	0	2	1	1	0	1	0	37	1
Millwall	Total		99	4	4	1	4	0	4	0	111	5
Brentford	1993–94	Second Division	10	1	—		—		—		10	1
Blackpool	1994–95	Second Division	17	0	1	0	—		2 (Note: Appearances in Football League Trophy)	0	20	0
Cambridge United	1996–97	Third Division	24	2	0	0	1	1	0	0	25	3
Cambridge United	Total		46	2	0	0	3	1	0	0	49	3
Yeovil Town	1997–98	Conference	4	1	—		—		—		4	1
Career total			176	8	5	1	7	1	6	0	194	10
