= Kenny Cunningham =

Irish former footballer (born 1971)

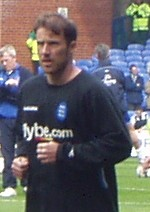
- Warming up for Birmingham, April 2005

Personal information
- Full name: Kenneth Edward Cunningham
- Date of birth: 28 June 1971 (age 55)
- Place of birth: Dublin, Republic of Ireland
- Height: 6 ft 0 in (1.83 m)
- Position: Defender

Youth career
- –: Home Farm

Senior career*
Years	Team	Apps	(Gls)
1988–1989	Tolka Rovers		
1989–1994	Millwall	136	(1)
1994–2002	Wimbledon	250	(0)
2002–2006	Birmingham City	134	(0)
2006–2007	Sunderland	11	(0)
Total		531	(1)

International career
1994	Republic of Ireland B	1	(0)
1996–2005	Republic of Ireland	72	(0)
- * Club domestic league appearances and goals

Kenneth Edward Cunningham (born 28 June 1971) is an Irish former footballer who played as a defender. He played international football for the Republic of Ireland until his retirement in 2005. He spent his professional club career, from 1989 to 2007, in England, making more than 500 appearances in the Football League and Premier League playing for Millwall, Wimbledon, Birmingham City and Sunderland.

After retirement as a professional player, he worked as a pundit for RTÉ Sport, and successfully completed the UEFA Pro Licence coaching qualification in 2011.

== Early life and career ==
Cunningham was born in Dublin. He attended St. Vincent's C.B.S. primary and secondary school in the Glasnevin district. At school, he played more Gaelic football than soccer: he played for St Vincent's at Croke Park alongside future Gaelic star Dessie Farrell in a schools' final, and played for Na Fianna and the Dublin minor team. At association football, he played for the Home Farm club from under-9s to under-17s, before moving on to amateur club Tolka Rovers.

== Club career ==
=== Millwall ===
On 18 September 1989, the 18-year-old Cunningham signed a one-year contract with Millwall of the English First Division. His expectations, to play out the season in England and use the experience to earn himself a good contract back in Ireland, changed when, three months before the end of that "trial" season, Millwall offered him a further two-year contract. He made his Football League debut on 17 March 1990, at right back in the starting eleven in a 1–1 draw away to Norwich City, and started four more first-team games during that season. In five years with the club, he made 136 league appearances. scoring his only career goal at Portsmouth in April 1994.

=== Wimbledon ===
Cunningham and teammate Jon Goodman moved to Wimbledon in November 1994, for the joint fee of £1,300,000. Cunningham played 250 league games for Wimbledon and twice named as the London side's Player of the Season. In February 2000, Cunningham was involved in an incident with Chelsea captain Dennis Wise following their match. Cunningham admitted improper behaviour in response to severe provocation from Wise and was fined £5,000 by The Football Association. Wise was charged with misconduct for the alleged confrontation in the tunnel and fined £7,500 and Chelsea and Wimbledon were both fined £50,000 each for failing to control their players.

=== Birmingham City ===
Cunningham moved to Birmingham City, newly promoted to the Premier League, in 2002 for a £600,000 fee. He went straight into the starting eleven, playing at centre back in place of injured captain Steve Vickers rather than his customary right back. He formed a fine defensive partnership with Matthew Upson, who joined in the January transfer window, and at the end of that campaign, his teammates chose him as their Player of the Season.

After the first few matches of 2003–04, Birmingham's manager Steve Bruce was describing Cunningham as "on current form ... the best defender in the Premiership". Nicknamed "King Kenny" by the fans, Cunningham had a reputation as an organised solid defender, and Manchester United and Ireland full-back Denis Irwin suggested in November 2003 that, though his ability had been under-rated in the past, "this year ... people are realising how good he actually is".

After the club's relegation at the end of the 2005–06 Premier League season, Cunningham and seven other first team players were released. On 11 May 2006, Cunningham launched a scathing attack in the press on Bruce and the board, blaming the club's relegation on a lack of preparation throughout the season and likening the club to a "stiff corpse" that has "no heartbeat and, more worryingly, no soul". While fans were in the main supportive of Cunningham's views, the club reacted furiously, and chairman David Gold wondered "if Kenny would have said the same things if we'd stayed up, Portsmouth had gone down and he'd been given a lucrative new contract".

=== Sunderland ===
Cunningham signed for Sunderland on 19 July 2006 with Sunderland chairman Niall Quinn praising his leadership qualities. He made 11 appearances for the Black Cats as they won the Championship, but no more appearances after October when he was made captain by manager Roy Keane before sustaining an injury. He was released at the end of the season, and retired as a player.

== International career ==
Cunningham won a total of 72 caps for the Republic of Ireland national football team. He made his debut on 24 April 1996 in 2–0 friendly loss to the Czech Republic in Prague.

He was named as FAI Senior International Player of the Year in 1998.

In March 2001, he returned after a long layoff due to injury, replacing Richard Dunne to partner Gary Breen in defence for a match against Cyprus. Cunningham was named team captain after the 2002 FIFA World Cup. According to manager Mick McCarthy: "Kenny's qualities as a player are easy to see. From day one he has been a great influence. He is a talker on the pitch, he organises the players around him, and off the pitch he is a calm influence.

He retired from international football after achieving 72 caps at the age of 34 on 12 October 2005, following Ireland's draw with Switzerland at Lansdowne Road, which resulted in his team's failure to qualify for the 2006 FIFA World Cup.

Cunningham urged caution following a FIFA rule change allowing players over the age of 21 to switch their international allegiance. Commenting in relation to Ireland's qualifying campaign ahead of the 2010 FIFA World Cup, he said: "It wouldn't be something I'd be hugely in favour of" and "I'd be very disappointed if I was a player in that squad to miss out on the World Cup for somebody who was jumping on board at the last minute".

== After football ==
Cunningham has worked as a pundit on the Premier League and Champions League for both Setanta Ireland and Premier Sports, on RTÉ Sport's coverage of the League of Ireland and for Sky Sports's coverage of Ireland matches. He coached at English non-league club Nuneaton Town, who won promotion in his first year there. before completing his UEFA Pro Licence in Ireland. He was appointed assistant to the League of Ireland XI manager Damien Richardson for the Dublin Super Cup tournament in 2011. He covered tournaments including the 2013 Confederations Cup, 2014 World Cup, Euro 2016, and Euro 2020.

== Career statistics ==
=== Club ===
Source: Kenny Cunningham at the English National Football Archive (subscription required)

Appearances and goals by club, season and competition
Club	Season	League			FA Cup		League Cup		Other		Total	
Club	Season	Division	Apps	Goals	Apps	Goals	Apps	Goals	Apps	Goals	Apps	Goals
Millwall	1989–90	First Division	5	0	0	0	0	0	0	0	5	0
Millwall	1990–91	Second Division	23	0	0	0	1	0	0	0	24	0
Millwall	1991–92	Second Division	17	0	1	0	0	0	0	0	18	0
Millwall	1992–93	First Division	37	0	0	0	4	0	2 (Note: Appearances in Anglo-Italian Cup)	1	43	1
Millwall	1993–94	First Division	39	1	0	0	3	0	4 (Note: Two appearances in Anglo-Italian Cup, two in First Division play-offs)	0	46	1
Millwall	1994–95	First Division	15	0	—		2	0	—		17	0
Millwall	Total		136	1	1	0	10	0	6	1	153	2
Wimbledon	1994–95	Premier League	28	0	4	0	—		—		32	0
Wimbledon	1995–96	Premier League	33	0	8	0	2	0	0	0	43	0
Wimbledon	1996–97	Premier League	36	0	7	0	7	0	—		50	0
Wimbledon	1997–98	Premier League	32	0	3	0	3	0	—		38	0
Wimbledon	1998–99	Premier League	35	0	2	0	7	0	—		44	0
Wimbledon	1999–2000	Premier League	37	0	2	0	4	0	—		43	0
Wimbledon	2000–01	First Division	15	0	5	0	0	0	—		20	0
Wimbledon	2001–02	First Division	34	0	2	0	0	0	—		36	0
Wimbledon	Total		250	0	33	0	23	0	0	0	306	0
Birmingham City	2002–03	Premier League	31	0	0	0	1	0	—		32	0
Birmingham City	2003–04	Premier League	36	0	4	0	1	0	—		41	0
Birmingham City	2004–05	Premier League	36	0	1	0	1	0	—		38	0
Birmingham City	2005–06	Premier League	31	0	2	0	0	0	—		33	0
Birmingham City	Total		134	0	7	0	3	0	—		144	0
Sunderland	2006–07	Championship	11	0	0	0	1	0	—		12	0
Career total			531	1	41	0	37	0	6	1	615	2

== Honours ==
Sunderland

- Football League Championship: 2006–07

Individual

- FAI Senior International Player of the Year: 1998
- Wimbledon Player of the Season: 1999–2000, 2001–02
