= Kasey Keller =

American soccer player (born 1969)

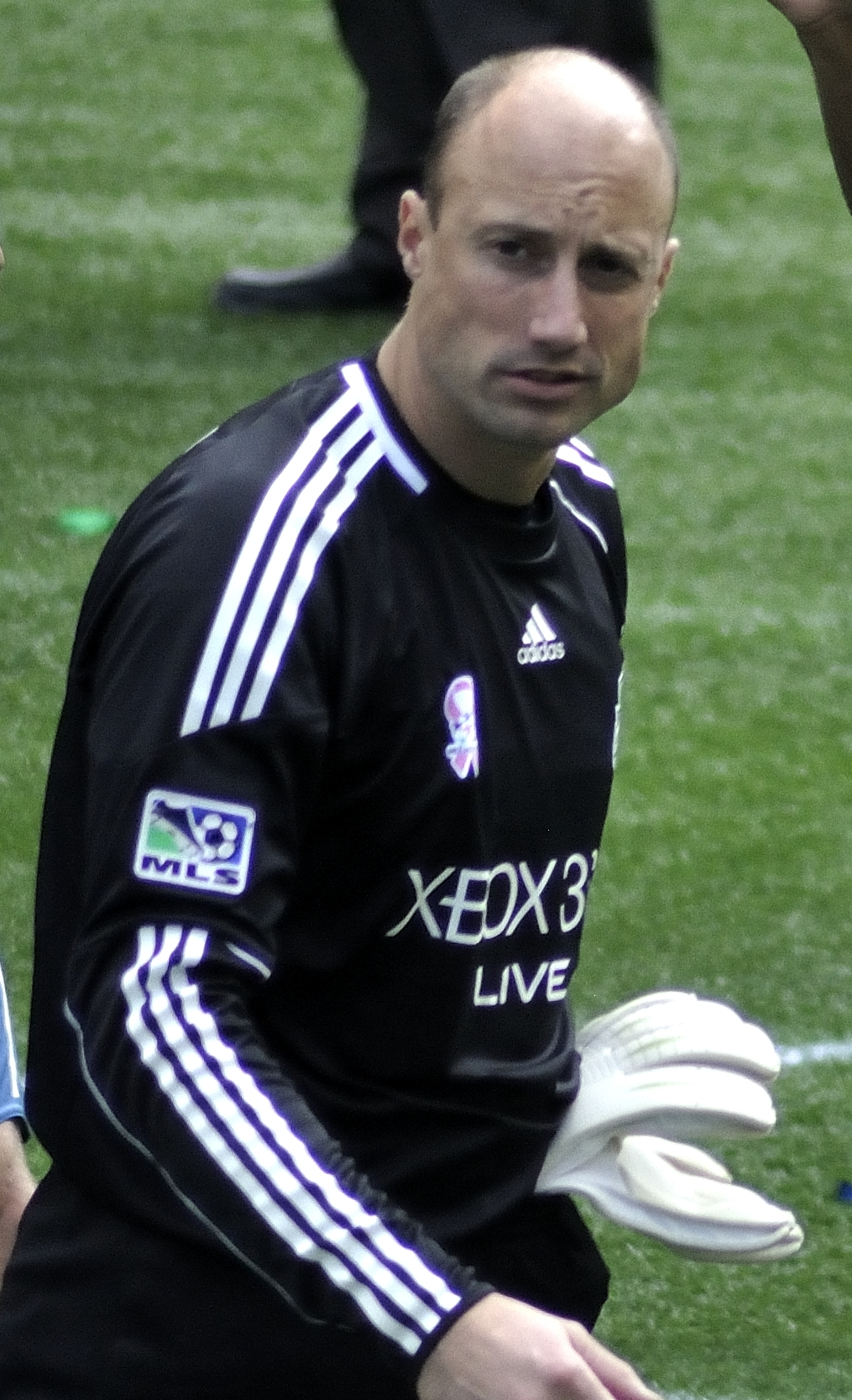
- Keller with Seattle Sounders FC in 2010

Personal information
- Full name: Kasey C. Keller
- Date of birth: November 29, 1969 (age 56)
- Place of birth: Olympia, Washington, U.S.
- Height: 6 ft 2 in (1.88 m)
- Position: Goalkeeper

College career
Years	Team	Apps	(Gls)
1988–1991	Portland Pilots		

Senior career*
Years	Team	Apps	(Gls)
1989	Portland Timbers	10	(0)
1992–1996	Millwall	175	(0)
1996–1999	Leicester City	99	(0)
1999–2001	Rayo Vallecano	51	(0)
2001–2005	Tottenham Hotspur	85	(0)
2004	→ Southampton (loan)	4	(0)
2005–2007	Borussia Mönchengladbach	78	(0)
2007–2008	Fulham	13	(0)
2009–2011	Seattle Sounders FC	93	(0)
Total		609	(0)

International career
1989	United States U20	6	(0)
1996	United States Olympic (O.P.)	3	(0)
1990–2007	United States	102	(0)

Managerial career
- 2013: United States U20 (assistant)
Medal record
Representing United States
Men's soccer
FIFA Confederations Cup
Third place	1999 Mexico
CONCACAF Gold Cup
Winner	1991 United States
Third place	1996 United States
Runner-up	1998 United States
Winner	2002 United States
Third place	2003 United States–Mexico
Winner	2005 United States
Winner	2007 United States
Pan American Games
Gold medal – first place	1991 Havana	Team
- * Club domestic league appearances and goals

Kasey C. Keller (born November 29, 1969) is an American former professional soccer coach and player. He is a four-time FIFA World Cup participant and was the first American goalkeeper to become a regular in the Bundesliga, the Premier League, and La Liga.

Keller played in Europe and the United States, and was the starting goalkeeper for the United States national team. He retired after three seasons with Seattle Sounders FC after they joined Major League Soccer.

Keller frequently appears on ESPN FC and was the Sounders' color commentator in local television broadcasts from 2012 to 2022.

He was assistant coach for the U.S. under-20 team and goalkeeper coach for the U.S. national team in 2013.

== Club career ==
=== Early career ===
Keller was born in Olympia, Washington. He attended North Thurston High School in Lacey, where he led his team to the state championship as the starting goalkeeper. He was also a Parade All-American athlete for three years in high school. Keller chose to play college soccer at the University of Portland under head coach Clive Charles due to his experience as a professional in England. As a freshman in 1988, he helped lead the team to the NCAA men's soccer final four. He earned first team All American as a senior and was the 1991 Adidas Goalkeeper of the Year. During the 1989 college off-season, he played for the Portland Timbers of the Western Soccer Alliance. His outstanding play led to his selection as league MVP that year. In 10 games, he allowed only four goals, for a 0.38 goals-against-average and eight clean sheets.

In 1989, he split his time between the Portland Timbers and the U.S. U-20 national team, which finished fourth at the 1989 FIFA U-20 World Cup. Keller once again excelled and was awarded the tournament's Silver Ball as the tournament's second-best player.

=== Millwall ===
After being a member of the U.S. national team in the 1990 FIFA World Cup, he was signed by the English club Millwall, playing there and becoming a fan favorite between 1992 and 1996. Keller made his Millwall debut on May 2, 1992, and played his last game on May 5, 1996, making 202 overall appearances for The Lions. Keller was voted Player of The Year 1992–93 by the Lions fans and also picked up the Junior Lions and Disabled Millwall Fans' awards. When Millwall were relegated to the Second Division, the team transferred Keller to Leicester City for £900,000 on August 15, 1996.

Keller was still studying for a sociology degree by correspondence when he played for Millwall, and wrote a paper on the club's hooligans.

=== Leicester City ===
In his first year with Leicester City, Keller played a vital part in the team's success in both a strong league position and winning the 1997 League Cup. The team reached the final again in 1999; a last minute goal lost them the match. That summer, he left the club for Spain on a free transfer.

=== Rayo Vallecano ===
Keller signed with the newly promoted Spanish club Rayo Vallecano for the 1999–2000 season and played there for two years.

=== Tottenham Hotspur ===
In August 2001, Keller returned to England and the Premier League, joining Tottenham Hotspur on a free transfer. Relegated to backup duty for Neil Sullivan early on, he won the starting spot and played every minute for Spurs in both the 2002–03 and the 2003–04 seasons.

In the 2004–05 Premiership season, Keller fell out of favor at Tottenham, as Paul Robinson became the first-choice keeper. In November 2004, Kasey was loaned out to Southampton, a Premiership club ravaged by injuries to its goalkeepers, for one month.

=== Borussia Mönchengladbach ===
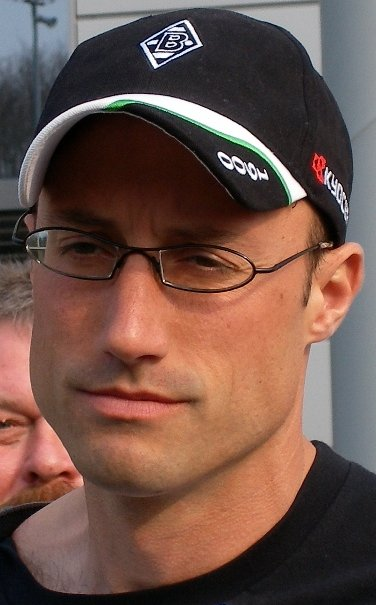
Keller with Borussia Mönchengladbach in 2007

On January 15, 2005, Keller joined German Bundesliga side Borussia Mönchengladbach on a free transfer during the Bundesliga's winter break. He got off to a good start in the Bundesliga, keeping a clean sheet in his first appearance for Borussia. Keller played every minute in the second half of the season and kept a total of seven clean sheets in that period, playing an important role in saving the club from relegation.

Keller also lived in Haus Donk, a castle in Tönisvorst, near Mönchengladbach. During the 2006–07 season he was one of the two Bundesliga players to be hobby-columnists for RUND, a German soccer magazine published monthly, reflecting his life in Germany and his Bundesliga career within those lines. He shared that role with VfB Stuttgart's shot-stopper Timo Hildebrand.

On August 10, 2006, Keller was selected by his teammates to captain club side Borussia Mönchengladbach during the 2006–07 campaign. He is the second American (after Claudio Reyna) to captain a top-level German club.

=== Fulham ===
In August 2007, Keller returned to the Premier League, signing for Fulham. The length of Keller's contract and financial details were not disclosed by the club. He was bought as a backup to goalkeeper Antti Niemi, but nagging injuries to Niemi saw him take over as principal goalkeeper at Fulham. However, the day before the Premier League match against Derby County in October, Keller injured his arm in training and was on the sidelines until late January. He returned as a substitute keeper in the 2–1 win over Aston Villa on February 3. From then on he was only second choice until Fulham's match against Blackburn where he started the game, with Niemi on the bench. He then went on to start Fulham's remaining games as they defied all odds and avoided relegation on the last day of the season with a 1–0 win over Portsmouth at Fratton Park.

=== Seattle Sounders FC ===
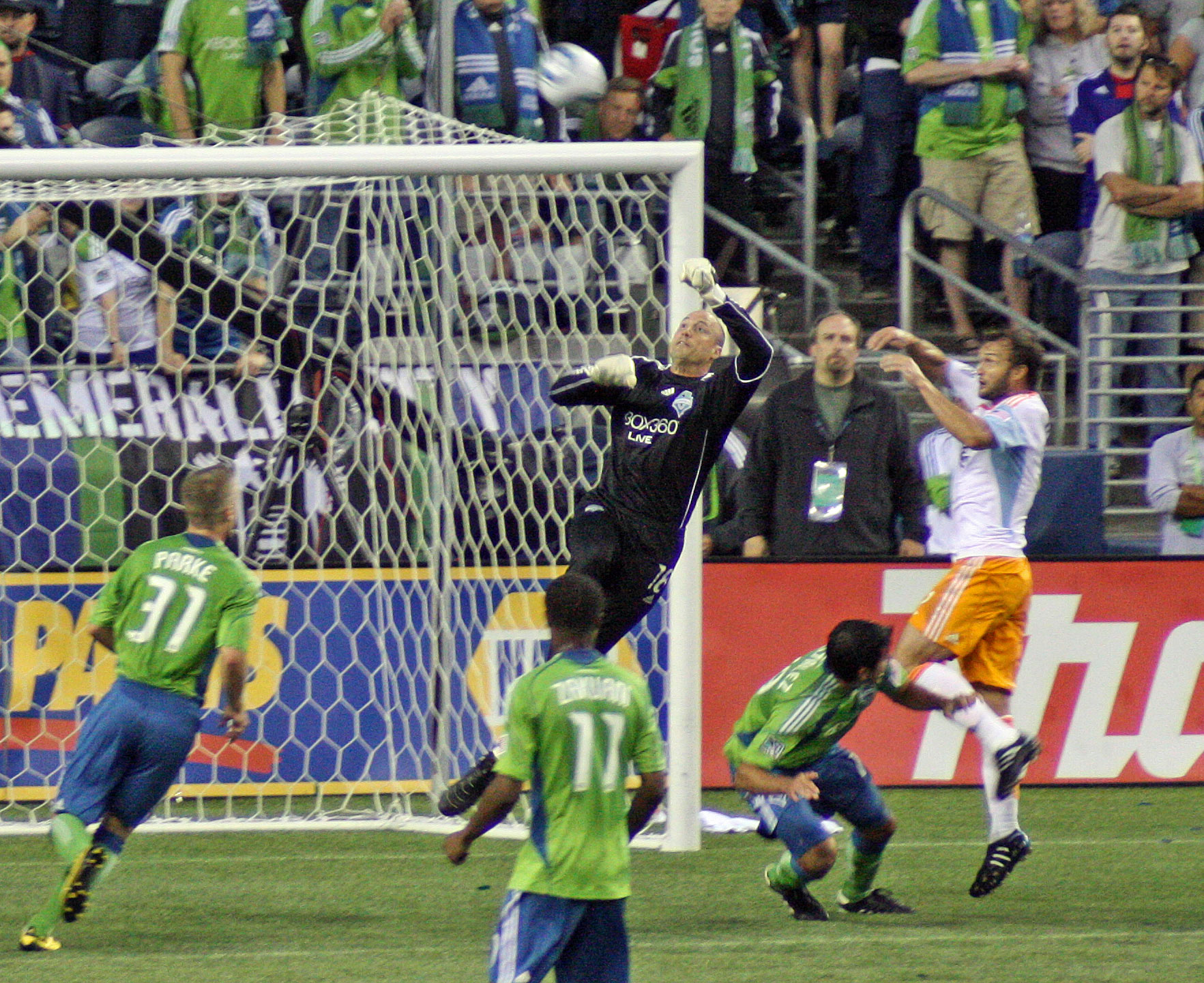
Keller during a Sounders match in 2010

Keller considered retiring after the 2007–08 season, but instead returned to the United States to sign with Major League Soccer expansion team Seattle Sounders FC on August 14, 2008. He was the starting goalkeeper for the MLS team's first-ever match, on March 19, 2009, which the Sounders won 3–0. He continued to have a clean sheet in each of his next three starts, with a score of 2–0 per start. He also set the record for most minutes without a goal to start a season in MLS history. His clean sheet streak came to an end on May 2, at 457 minutes in the second half of a game against the Chicago Fire FC. He started in every match of the 2009 U.S. Open Cup, as the Sounders won the title after beating D.C. United in the final on September 2, 2009, thus becoming the second expansion team in MLS history to win the tournament in their inaugural season. Keller was then named TheCup.us Player of the Tournament. On October 3, Keller recorded his 10th clean-sheet in a 1–0 over Columbus Crew to end the Crew's 22-game home unbeaten streak.

In the 2010 season, the 40-year-old Keller was the only Sounders FC player to have started every league match (32) in regular season and playoffs, logging a total of 3585 in all competitions. On June 27, he recorded a season-high nine saves in a 1–3 loss to Philadelphia Union, and three days later, he made two stops in a penalty shootout against Portland Timbers in the round of 16 of the 2010 U.S. Open Cup. On August 8, Keller recorded his first MLS assist with a long pass to Fredy Montero's opening goal in an eventual 2–0 win over Houston Dynamo, thus becoming the first Sounders goalkeeper to show up on the score sheet, and at the age of 40, one of the oldest player to register a goal contribution in MLS history. On September 9, Keller saved a first-half penalty in a goalless draw with Real Salt Lake. On October 5, Keller won his second U.S. Open Cup title after helping his side beat Columbus Crew 2–1 in the final in front of 31,311, the largest crowd to witness a US Open Cup final; Seattle thus become the first MLS club to successfully defend the Open Cup title and the first club overall to repeat since the New York Pancyprian-Freedoms did so in 1982 and 1983. He ended the 2010 season with 11 clean-sheets, thus surpassing his 2009 total. He won MLS Save of the Year for his stop against Kansas City Wizards on April 17 and six of his 82 saves were voted MLS Save of the Week.

In the 2011 MLS season, the 41-year-old Keller finished third in the MLS saves leader with 110. On October 4, Keller started in his third consecutive Open Cup final, keeping a clean sheet in a 2–0 win over the Chicago Fire in front of 35,615, the largest crowd to witness a US Open Cup final, and in doing so at the age of 41 years and 306 days, he became the oldest player in the competition's history at the time, a record that has since been surpassed by Marcus Hahnemann in 2014 and Claudio Muñoz in 2024. He played his final regular season home game for the Sounders on October 15, 2011, helping his side to a 2–1 win over the San Jose Earthquakes in front of a record crowd of 64,140 people were present. In the following week, on October 22, Keller played his last match for the club in a 3–1 win over Chivas USA, and in doing so at the age of 41 years and 324 days, he became the third oldest player in the history of the MLS, only behind Preki (42) and Pat Onstad (43).

== International career ==
Keller got his first senior team cap against Colombia on February 4, 1990, and was on the roster as Tony Meola's back up at the 1990 FIFA World Cup.

After being ignored by U.S. coach Bora Milutinović for the 1994 FIFA World Cup, he was selected by Steve Sampson for several tournaments. Keller was part of the team that finished fourth in the 1995 Copa América and went on to play two games during the 1998 World Cup. Keller was an overage selection for the 1996 Olympics team, starting all three matches.

Keller was named U.S. Soccer Athlete of the Year an unprecedented three times, in 1997 and 1999, and again in 2005.

Perhaps his most famous clean sheet came in the historic 1998 win versus Brazil. Keller played all 90 minutes in goal and made ten saves, many from point-blank range, in preserving the 1–0 shutout victory for the U.S. His performance in goal prompted Brazilian great Romário to remark "That is the best performance by a goalkeeper I have ever seen," the performance was commemorated in the song "Kasey Keller" by synth-pop band Barcelona.

For most of their careers, Keller and Brad Friedel were engaged in a head-to-head battle for the U.S. goalkeeper's jersey. Keller got the nod in 1998 but was second choice to Friedel in the 2002 FIFA World Cup. In spite of this stiff competition he has the second most caps and wins of any men's goalkeeper in U.S. soccer history with 102 and 53, respectively, behind Tim Howard. Keller remains the team's all-time leader in keeping clean sheets with 47.

Keller crowned the U.S.'s run in the 2005 CONCACAF Gold Cup tournament with a clean sheet in the final match against Panama and two saves in the penalty shootout to give the side the trophy. Keller started the first seven games of the final round of World Cup qualifying in 2005, recording five consecutive clean sheets and 507 consecutive goalless minutes to lead the U.S. to qualification for the 2006 FIFA World Cup Finals in Germany. He then became the first male player in U.S. history to win his third Athlete of the Year award. On May 2, 2006, Keller and teammate Claudio Reyna became the first two American men named to four World Cup rosters. In that World Cup, he played in all three games, being named Man of the Match in the 1–1 draw with Italy in Kaiserslautern on June 17, 2006. Keller is the only U.S. player to participate in both the 1990 and 2006 World Cups.

== Broadcasting career ==
Keller joined the Seattle Sounders FC broadcast team as a color commentator alongside play-by-play announcer Ross Fletcher in 2012. He remained with the club through the 2022 season, when Apple TV's MLS Season Pass took over from local broadcasters. Keller also worked on ESPN broadcasts as a color commentator and studio analyst for various international tournaments and ESPN FC programs.

== Personal life ==
Keller resides in Seattle with his wife Kristin and their two children, twins born on August 26, 1997. Keller has lived in London, Madrid, and Germany, where he and his family lived in a 1,000-year-old castle. During his time abroad, Keller learned to speak German and Spanish fluently.

He told the New York Times that he turned down offers from several European clubs to sign with Seattle for the sake of his children, who have attended a new school with every transfer he has made. In another interview, Keller revealed that he wrote two academic papers on Millwall hooliganism, an experience had during his playing career at the English club to earn a degree in sociology. Keller was diagnosed with non-Hodgkins lymphoma late in his career with the Sounders and underwent treatments from 2018 to 2021, when he entered remission.

A street adjacent to Keller's alma mater, North Thurston High School in Olympia, Washington, was renamed "Kasey Keller Drive" in the 2000s.

In April 2016, Keller and his former USMNT goalkeeper teammate Marcus Hahnemann became coaches of the boys' soccer team at Newport High School in Bellevue, Washington. He also owns a minority stake in AC Boise, a professional team in USL League One.

== Career statistics ==
=== Club ===
Appearances and goals by club, season and competition
Club	Season	League			National cup		League cup		Continental		Other		Total	
Club	Season	Division	Apps	Goals	Apps	Goals	Apps	Goals	Apps	Goals	Apps	Goals	Apps	Goals
Portland Timbers	1989	Western Soccer Alliance	10	0	—		1	0	—		—		11	0
Millwall	1992–93	First Division	45	0	1	0	3	0	—		1	0	50	0
Millwall	1993–94	First Division	44	0	1	0	3	0	—		3	0	51	0
Millwall	1994–95	First Division	44	0	5	0	5	0	—		—		54	0
Millwall	1995–96	First Division	42	0	1	0	3	0	—		—		46	0
Millwall	Total		175	0	8	0	14	0	—		4	0	201	0
Leicester City	1996–97	Premier League	31	0	4	0	7	0	—		—		32	0
Leicester City	1997–98	Premier League	32	0	2	0	1	0	2	0	—		37	0
Leicester City	1998–99	Premier League	36	0	2	0	7	0	—		—		45	0
Leicester City	Total		99	0	8	0	15	0	2	0	—		117	0
Rayo Vallecano	1999–2000	La Liga	28	0	0	0	—		—		—		28	0
Rayo Vallecano	2000–01	La Liga	23	0	0	0	—		5	0	—		28	0
Rayo Vallecano	Totals		51	0	0	0	—		5	0	—		56	0
Tottenham Hotspur	2001–02	Premier League	9	0	0	0	1	0	—		—		10	0
Tottenham Hotspur	2002–03	Premier League	38	0	1	0	1	0	—		—		40	0
Tottenham Hotspur	2003–04	Premier League	38	0	3	0	4	0	—		—		45	0
Tottenham Hotspur	2004–05	Premier League	0	0	0	0	2	0	—		—		2	0
Tottenham Hotspur	Total		85	0	4	0	8	0	—		—		97	0
Southampton (loan)	2004–05	Premier League	4	0	—		—		—		—		4	0
Borussia Mönchengladbach	2004–05	Bundesliga	17	0	—		—		—		—		17	0
Borussia Mönchengladbach	2005–06	Bundesliga	33	0	2	0	—		—		—		35	0
Borussia Mönchengladbach	2006–07	Bundesliga	28	0	0	0	—		—		—		28	0
Borussia Mönchengladbach	Total		78	0	2	0	—		—		—		80	0
Fulham	2007–08	Premier League	13	0	0	0	1	0	—		—		14	0
Seattle Sounders FC	2009	Major League Soccer	29	0	4	0	2	0	—		—		35	0
Seattle Sounders FC	2010	Major League Soccer	30	0	3	0	2	0	5	0	—		40	0
Seattle Sounders FC	2011	Major League Soccer	34	0	2	0	2	0	5	0	—		43	0
Seattle Sounders FC	Total		93	0	9	0	6	0	10	0	—		118	0
Career total			608	0	31	0	44	0	17	0	4	0	705	0

=== International ===
Appearances and goals by national team and year
National team	Year	Apps	Goals
United States	1990	6	0
United States	1992	1	0
United States	1995	4	0
United States	1996	7	0
United States	1997	6	0
United States	1998	10	0
United States	1999	5	0
United States	2000	7	0
United States	2001	4	0
United States	2002	10	0
United States	2003	7	0
United States	2004	8	0
United States	2005	14	0
United States	2006	7	0
United States	2007	6	0
Total		102	0

== Honors ==
Leicester City

- Football League Cup: 1996–97; runner-up: 1998–99

Tottenham Hotspur

- Football League Cup runner-up: 2001–02

Seattle Sounders FC

- Lamar Hunt U.S. Open Cup: 2009, 2010, 2011

United States

- CONCACAF Gold Cup: 1991, 2002, 2005, 2007

Individual

- Millwall Player of the Year: 1992–93
- National Soccer Hall of Fame: 2015
- FIFA World Youth Championship Silver Ball: 1989
- Honda Player of the Year: 1999, 2005
- U.S. Soccer Athlete of the Year: 1997, 1999, 2005
- MLS Save of the Year: 2010, 2011
- MLS Goalkeeper of the Year: 2011
- MLS Best XI: 2011
- Western Soccer League MVP:1989 Western Soccer League
- Western Soccer League Top Goalkeeper: 1989
- State of Washington Sports Hall of Fame: 2017
- CONCACAF Gold Cup Best XI: 1998, 2005 (Honorable Mention)

== See also ==
- List of men's footballers with 100 or more international caps
