= Wes Reid =

English footballer

Personal information
- Full name: Wesley Andrew Reid
- Date of birth: 10 September 1968 (age 58)
- Place of birth: Lewisham, England
- Position: Midfielder

Youth career
- Arsenal

Senior career*
Years	Team	Apps	(Gls)
1987–1991	Millwall	6	(0)
1991–1992	Bradford City	35	(3)
1992–1995	Airdrieonians	50	(2)
- Dulwich Hamlet
Total		91	(5)
- * Club domestic league appearances and goals

Wesley Andrew Reid (born 10 September 1968) is an English former professional footballer who played as a midfielder.

== Career ==
Born in Lewisham, Reid started his career as an apprentice at Arsenal. He moved to Millwall in July 1987, and to Bradford City in January 1991. He later played in Scotland for Airdrieonians and in non-league football for Dulwich Hamlet.
