= Brian Horne =

English footballer (born 1967)

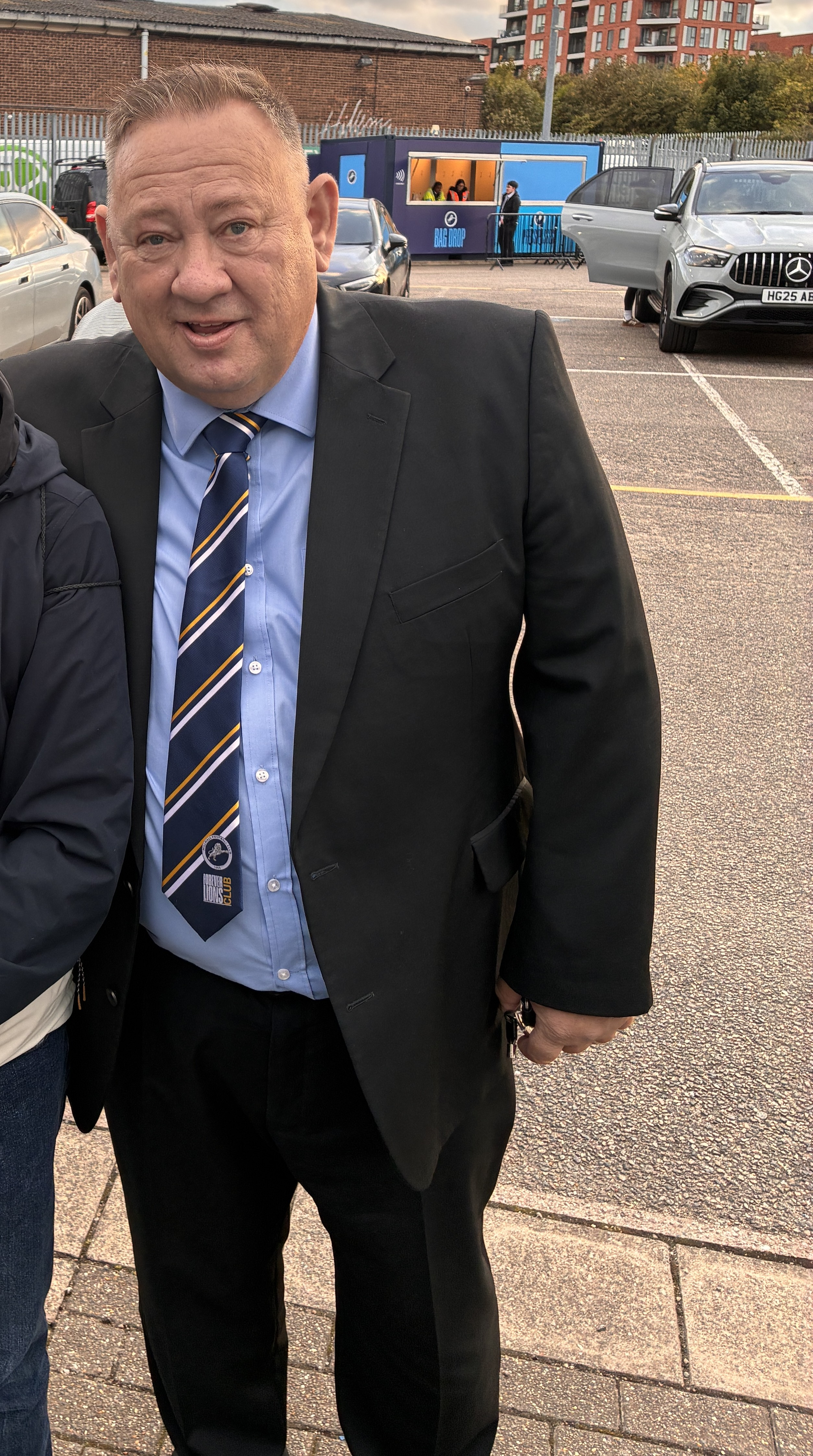
- Brian Horne in 2025.

Personal information
- Full name: Brian Simon Horne
- Date of birth: 5 October 1967 (age 59)
- Place of birth: Billericay, England
- Height: 5 ft 10 in (1.78 m)
- Position: Goalkeeper

Senior career*
| Years | Team | Apps | (Gls) |
| 1985–1992 | Millwall | 163 | (0) |
| 1992 | → Middlesbrough (loan) | 4 | (0) |
| 1992 | → Stoke City (loan) | 1 | (0) |
| 1993–1994 | Portsmouth | 3 | (0) |
| 1994–1996 | Hartlepool United | 73 | (0) |
| 1996–1997 | Dover Athletic | 27 | (0) |
| 1997 | Farnborough Town | 9 | (0) |
| Total | | 280 | (0) |

International career
| 1985 | England U17 | 1 | (0) |
| 1985–1986 | England Youth | 7 | (0) |

Managerial career
- 2003: Aveley
- * Club domestic league appearances and goals

Brian Simon Horne (born 5 October 1967) is an English former footballer who played professionally as a goalkeeper for Millwall, Middlesbrough, Stoke City, Portsmouth and Hartlepool United.

== Career ==
Horne was born in Billericay and began his career with Millwall making 38 appearances in his debut season of 1986–87. He played in 51 matches in 1987–88 as the "Lions" won the Second Division earning promotion to the First Division for the first time in their history with Horne winning the supporters player of the year award. He played 51 times again in 1988–89 as Millwall took the top tier well finishing in 10th position but they struggled in 1989–90 and were relegated. Horne remained at The Den in the Second tier making 36 appearances in 1990–91. He spent time out on loan at Middlesbrough in September 1992 and at Stoke City in October. At Stoke Horne played twice away at Chester City and at home to Cambridge United in the League Cup. He then joined Portsmouth as back up to Alan Knight playing five times in 1993–94. Horne ended his professional career with Hartlepool United playing in 83 matches in two seasons. He later played non-league football with Dover Athletic and Farnborough Town, and managed Aveley.

== Career statistics ==
Appearances and goals by club, season and competition
| Club | Season | League | | | FA Cup | | League Cup | | Other (Note: Includes Anglo-Italian Cup, Football League play-offs, Full Members Cup, Football League Trophy.) | | Total | |
| Club | Season | Division | Apps | Goals | Apps | Goals | Apps | Goals | Apps | Goals | Apps | Goals |
|---|---|---|---|---|---|---|---|---|---|---|---|---|
| Millwall | 1986–87 | Second Division | 32 | 0 | 3 | 0 | 2 | 0 | 1 | 0 | 38 | 0 |
| Millwall | 1987–88 | Second Division | 43 | 0 | 1 | 0 | 4 | 0 | 3 | 0 | 51 | 0 |
| Millwall | 1988–89 | First Division | 38 | 0 | 2 | 0 | 3 | 0 | 3 | 0 | 51 | 0 |
| Millwall | 1989–90 | First Division | 22 | 0 | 0 | 0 | 3 | 0 | 0 | 0 | 25 | 0 |
| Millwall | 1990–91 | Second Division | 28 | 0 | 3 | 0 | 2 | 0 | 3 | 0 | 36 | 0 |
| Millwall | 1991–92 | Second Division | 0 | 0 | 0 | 0 | 0 | 0 | 0 | 0 | 0 | 0 |
| Millwall | Total | | 163 | 0 | 9 | 0 | 14 | 0 | 10 | 0 | 196 | 0 |
| Middlesbrough (loan) | 1992–93 | Premier League | 4 | 0 | 0 | 0 | 0 | 0 | 0 | 0 | 4 | 0 |
| Stoke City (loan) | 1992–93 | Second Division | 1 | 0 | 0 | 0 | 1 | 0 | 0 | 0 | 2 | 0 |
| Portsmouth | 1993–94 | First Division | 3 | 0 | 0 | 0 | 0 | 0 | 2 | 0 | 5 | 0 |
| Hartlepool United | 1994–95 | Third Division | 41 | 0 | 1 | 0 | 3 | 0 | 2 | 0 | 47 | 0 |
| Hartlepool United | 1995–96 | Third Division | 32 | 0 | 1 | 0 | 2 | 0 | 1 | 0 | 36 | 0 |
| Hartlepool United | Total | | 73 | 0 | 2 | 0 | 5 | 0 | 3 | 0 | 83 | 0 |
| Career total | | | 244 | 0 | 11 | 0 | 20 | 0 | 15 | 0 | 290 | 0 |

== Honours ==
Millwall

- Football League Second Division champions: 1987–88
- Millwall – Player of the Year: 1987
