= Jon Goodman =

Footballer (born 1971)

Personal information
- Full name: Jonathan Goodman
- Date of birth: 2 June 1971 (age 55)
- Place of birth: Walthamstow, England
- Position: Forward

Youth career
- 1989–1990: Leyton Wingate

Senior career*
Years	Team	Apps	(Gls)
1990	Bromley	0	(0)
1990–1994	Millwall	109	(35)
1994–2000	Wimbledon	60	(11)
Total		169	(46)

International career
1997	Republic of Ireland	4	(0)

Managerial career
- 2017–2018: Notts County (academy)
- * Club domestic league appearances and goals

Jonathan Goodman (born 2 June 1971) is a former professional footballer who played as a forward for Wimbledon, Millwall and Bromley. Born in England, he represented the Republic of Ireland national team at international level.

Following retirement in 2000, Goodman pursued a career as a coach and sports scientist. He was most recently Academy Manager at Milton Keynes Dons.

== Early life ==
He was born in Walthamstow.

== Playing career ==
During the 1989–90 season, Goodman played non-league football at the now-defunct Leyton Wingate. At the end of the season he signed, along with the team's manager George Wakeling, for Bromley where he was immediately put on a contract. After playing well in just a handful of pre-season friendlies, he was signed by Millwall for a £34,500 fee in August 1990. Goodman made his Millwall debut on 26 December as a substitute at The Old Den against Leicester City, and it wasn't long before he was a regular member of the first team. His goals helped Millwall finish third in Division One in the 1993–94 season, but defeat to Derby County in the semi-finals of the playoffs ended their hopes of promotion to the FA Premier League.

Goodman was then sold to Wimbledon in November 1994 for £1.3million, making the move to Wimbledon with Millwall full-back Kenny Cunningham. He spent six seasons at Wimbledon, scoring 11 goals in 60 games as a semi-regular player in the team, competing with the likes of Efan Ekoku and Dean Holdsworth for a place in the starting line-up. He was injured in a match against Chelsea in 1997, and never truly recovered. After two short-lived comeback attempts, he retired through injury at the end of 1999–2000 when Wimbledon were relegated from the Premier League after 14 years of top flight football. Despite rarely having a long run in the first team and leaving the club at one of the lowest points in their history, he was a key squad player in some of their best seasons in the top flight, particularly their 1996–97 campaign where they finished eighth (having spent most of the season in the top five) and were semi-finalists in both of the domestic cups.

He was capped four times for the Republic of Ireland at the height of his success for Wimbledon in 1997.

== Coaching career ==
Following his retirement as a player, Goodman joined Reading as a sports scientist in the summer of 2005, before later joining then Northern Ireland manager Lawrie Sanchez' backroom team as a conditioning coach for the Euro 2008 qualifying campaign.

Goodman joined the Nike Academy in 2012 as a fitness coach, before joining Leeds United in a similar role in April 2013. He left the role in May 2014 to pursue other business interests. Following brief spells as Academy Manager for Notts County in 2017 and Assistant Head of Player Development for Tottenham Hotspur, Goodman announced he was joining Milton Keynes Dons as the club's Academy Manager on 8 April 2019. He stepped down from the role in December 2022.

== See also ==
- List of Republic of Ireland international footballers born outside the Republic of Ireland
