= Darren Treacy (footballer) =

English footballer

Darren Paul Treacy
Personal information
- Full name: Darren Paul Treacy
- Date of birth: 6 September 1970 (age 56)
- Place of birth: Lambeth, London, England
- Position: Midfielder

Senior career*
Years	Team	Apps	(Gls)
1988–1990	Millwall	7	(0)
1990–1991	Bradford City	16	(2)
Total		23	(2)
- * Club domestic league appearances and goals

Darren Paul Treacy (born 6 September 1970) is an English former professional footballer who played in the Football League as a midfielder.
