= Phil Barber =

English footballer

Personal information
- Full name: Phillip Andrew Barber
- Date of birth: 10 June 1965 (age 61)
- Place of birth: Tring, England
- Height: 5 ft 9 in (1.75 m)
- Position: Midfielder

Senior career*
Years	Team	Apps	(Gls)
- Aylesbury United
1984–1991	Crystal Palace	234	(35)
1991–1995	Millwall	110	(12)
1994–1995	→ Plymouth Argyle (loan)	4	(0)
1995–1996	Bristol City	3	(0)
1995	→ Mansfield Town (loan)	4	(1)
1996	→ Fulham (loan)	13	(1)
- Dover Athletic
- Crawley Town
- Carshalton Athletic
- Dulwich Hamlet
2000–2002	Croydon		
2002–2003	Redhill		
2003	St. Leonards		
Total		368	(49)
- * Club domestic league appearances and goals

Phillip Andrew Barber (born 10 June 1965) is an English former professional footballer who played as a midfielder.

== Career ==
Born in Tring, Barber played for Aylesbury United, Crystal Palace, Millwall, Plymouth Argyle, Bristol City, Mansfield Town, Fulham, Dover Athletic, Crawley Town, Carshalton Athletic, Dulwich Hamlet, Croydon, Redhill and St. Leonards. With Crystal Palace, Barber played in the 1990 FA Cup Final.

== Honours ==
Crystal Palace

- Football League Second Division play-offs: 1989
- FA Cup runner-up: 1989–90
