= Malcolm Allen (footballer) =

Welsh footballer

Personal information
- Date of birth: 21 March 1967 (age 59)
- Place of birth: Deiniolen, Gwynedd, Wales
- Height: 5 ft 8 in (1.73 m)
- Position: Striker

Senior career*
Years	Team	Apps	(Gls)
1985–1988	Watford	39	(5)
1987	→ Aston Villa (loan)	4	(0)
1988–1990	Norwich City	35	(8)
1990–1993	Millwall	81	(24)
1993–1995	Newcastle United	10	(5)
1996	Stevenage Borough		
Total		171	(44)

International career
1986–1993	Wales	14	(3)
- * Club domestic league appearances and goals

Malcolm Allen (born 21 March 1967) is a Welsh football coach, former professional footballer and sports pundit and co-commentator.

As a player, Allen was a striker, notably having a brief spell in the Premier League with Newcastle United and a loan spell with Aston Villa, although spells with Watford, Norwich City and Millwall in the Football League brought most of his appearances during his career. He retired having had a brief spell with non-league side Stevenage Borough. He was capped 14 times by Wales, scoring 3 goals.

Since retiring, Allen has worked as a youth team coach for Aberystwyth, but now works in media and is a pundit and commentator for S4C show Sgorio.

== Early life ==
Allen was born in Deiniolen, Gwynedd.

== Playing career ==
Allen began his career with Watford, signing apprentice terms in July 1983, before becoming professional in March 1985. He scored Watford's only goal in 1985 FA Youth Cup final. He played and scored for the Hornets in their FA Cup semi-final defeat against Tottenham Hotspur in 1987, and in 19 cup appearances for Watford scored eight goals. He was loaned to Aston Villa in September 1987 by new Watford manager Dave Bassett, and after Watford were relegated he joined Norwich for a fee of £175,000 in August 1988. Whilst with Norwich he scored four in their club record FA Cup victory, 8–0 against Sutton United in the fourth round. This was one of the most successful seasons in Norwich's history, as they finished fourth in the league and were semi-finalists in the FA Cup.

Allen joined Millwall in March 1990 for £400,000, spending three years there before moving to Newcastle United for £300,000 in August 1993, in time for their first season in the FA Premier League following their promotion as Division One champions. He started off well on Tyneside, scoring seven goals in 12 games, before suffering a serious ankle injury. He made just one more appearance for the Magpies, and after a long struggle to regain full fitness, he retired from playing aged 28 in December 1995.

In February 1997, Allen signed for Conference side Stevenage Borough in an attempt to continue his career at non-league level, and continued to play at this level in Hertfordshire for a few more years.

== International career ==
Allen represented Wales at youth, B and full international level. He received his first full cap aged 18, after only playing a small number of senior club games, taking to the field on 25 February 1986 in a 2–1 friendly win over Saudi Arabia in Dhahran. He was capped a total of 14 times by Wales at senior level, his last appearance coming on 17 November 1993 in the disappointing 2–1 defeat to Romania at Cardiff Arms Park, which ended their hopes of qualifying for the 1994 World Cup. This came shortly before the ankle injury which ultimately ended his career at senior level.

== Coaching career ==
Allen returned to his native Wales in the summer of 2002 to work as the head of youth development for Aberystwyth in the League of Wales.

== Media career ==
Allen is a pundit on Sgorio, a Welsh language football review programme on S4C. Malcolm also regularly co-commentates on live Sgorio games as well as on BBC Radio Cymru's Camp Lawn programme.

== Personal life ==
In August 2006, Allen was in court charged with assault. In April 2008, charged from his Watford home, he was given a suspended sentence and a ban for drink-driving after admitting drinking ten pints of beer.

In the autumn of 2009 Y Lolfa published his autobiography in his native Welsh language.
