= Etienne Verveer =

Dutch footballer

Personal information
- Full name: Etienne Evert Verveer
- Date of birth: 12 September 1968 (age 58)
- Place of birth: Paramaribo, Suriname
- Position: Midfielder

Senior career*
Years	Team	Apps	(Gls)
1987–1988	Ajax 2		
1988–1989	FC Chur 97	28	(2)
1989–1990	→ BSC Old Boys Basel (loan)	25	(6)
1990–1991	→ Urania Genève Sport (loan)	29	(6)
1991–1994	Millwall	55	(7)
1995	→ Bradford City (loan)	9	(1)
1995–1996	Aberdeen	0	(0)
1996–1998	Ischia	28	(0)
- * Club domestic league appearances and goals

Etienne Verveer (born 12 September 1968) is a Dutch former professional footballer.

Verveer has played his football across several countries including Netherlands, Switzerland, England, Scotland and Italy.
