= Darren Morgan (footballer, born 1967) =

English footballer

Personal information
- Date of birth: 5 November 1967 (age 58)
- Place of birth: Camberwell, England
- Height: 5 ft 8 in (1.73 m)
- Position: Midfielder

Senior career*
Years	Team	Apps	(Gls)
1986–1991	Millwall	44	(2)
1990	→ Bradford City (loan)	2	(0)
1991	→ Peterborough United (loan)	5	(0)
1991–1992	Bradford City	11	(0)
1992–1993	Erith & Belvedere	?	(?)
Total		62	(2)
- * Club domestic league appearances and goals

Darren Morgan (born 5 November 1967) is an English former professional footballer who played in the Football League as a midfielder.
