= Alan McLeary =

English footballer

Personal information
- Full name: Alan Terry McLeary
- Date of birth: 6 October 1964 (age 62)
- Place of birth: Lambeth, England
- Height: 5 ft 10 in (1.78 m)
- Position: Defender

Senior career*
Years	Team	Apps	(Gls)
1981–1993	Millwall	307	(5)
1992	→ Sheffield United (loan)	3	(0)
1992	→ Wimbledon (loan)	4	(0)
1993–1995	Charlton Athletic	66	(3)
1995–1997	Bristol City	34	(0)
1997–1999	Millwall	36	(0)
Total		450	(8)

International career
1982	England Youth	5	(0)

Managerial career
- 1999–2000: Millwall
- 2006: Millwall (caretaker)
- * Club domestic league appearances and goals

Alan McLeary (born 6 October 1964) is an English former professional footballer who played as a defender. He spent the majority of his career at Millwall, but also had spells at Charlton Athletic and Bristol City, as well as loan spells at Sheffield United and Wimbledon.

In 1998, McLeary was appointed assistant manager at Millwall, and in May 1999, he was promoted to co-manager alongside longtime teammate Keith Stevens. The duo were sacked in September 2000. He later had a short spell as caretaker manager at Millwall following the departure of David Tuttle at the end of the 2005–06 season.

== Honours ==
Millwall

- Football League Group Cup: 1982–83
