= Keith Stevens =

English footballer (born 1964)

Personal information
- Full name: Keith Henry Stevens
- Date of birth: 21 June 1964 (age 62)
- Place of birth: Merton, England
- Height: 6 ft 0 in (1.83 m)
- Position: Defender

Senior career*
Years	Team	Apps	(Gls)
1980–1999	Millwall	462	(9)

Managerial career
- 1998–2000: Millwall
- * Club domestic league appearances and goals

Keith Henry Stevens (born 21 June 1964) is an English former professional footballer who played as a defender, spending his entire career with Millwall.

== Career ==
Stevens made his debut with Millwall in a Third Division fixture against Oxford United in April 1981, when still only 16 years old. Stevens was nicknamed "Rhino" by his teammates, although it is unclear if this was due to his fearless tackling style or the size of his nose. He gained a regular first team place two seasons later and helped Millwall reach the Second Division in 1985 and the First Division (for the first time) in 1988. He helped them finish 10th in their first top division season, and even after their relegation the following year he was able to bolster their defence and ensure that they were at least a match for most other second-tier teams. In 1994, he was ever-present in the league as they finished third, but lost out on a place in the Premier League due to a playoff defeat at the hands of Derby County in the semi-finals. Millwall were relegated to Division Two in 1996, and although Stevens was no longer a regular first team player after this stage he continued as a player for another three seasons.

Stevens was appointed player-manager of Millwall in May 1998 on the dismissal of Billy Bonds, and named teammate Alan McLeary as his co-manager. They remained in charge until their controversial dismissal on 17 September 2000 after failing to get Millwall promoted back to Division One, a feat which was achieved eight months later under successor Mark McGhee, with the team that Stevens and McLeary had built.

Despite no longer being with the club, in April 2001 Millwall awarded Stevens a testimonial, culminating in a friendly with Tottenham Hotspur in August 2001.

Stevens later managed non-league Fisher Athletic until resigning in July 2002.

Keith Stevens and his family emigrated to Australia.

He was assistant coach of the inaugural championship winning club Brisbane Roar in the Australian women's W-League.

Keith is currently working with the Sri Lanka national team.

== Honours ==
=== As a player ===
Millwall

- Football League Group Cup: 1982–83

=== As a manager ===
Millwall

- Football League Trophy runner-up: 1998–99

== See also ==
- List of one-club men
