= The Old Den =

Former football stadium in London

- The Den
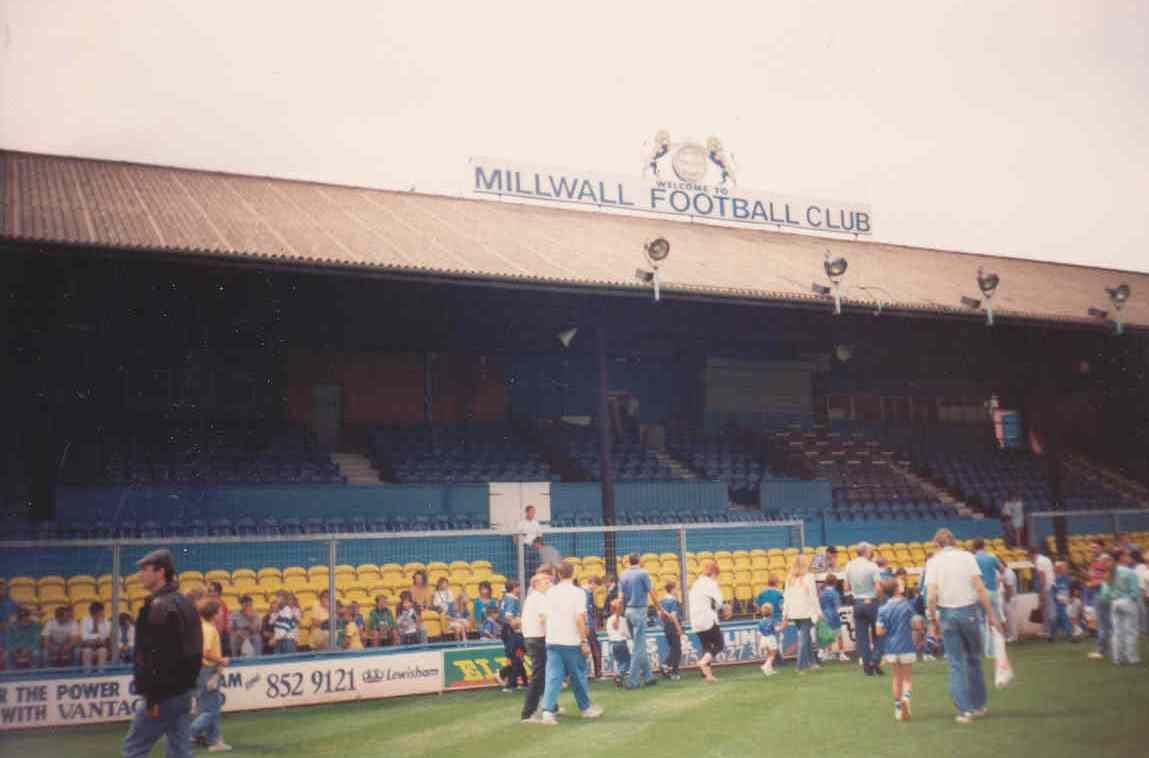
- Interactive map of The Old Den
- Location: New Cross; London, SE14; England
- Coordinates: 51.4808°N 0.0476°W
- Capacity: 4,536 (seated only); 22,000 (including standing)
- Surface: Grass

Construction
- Built: 1909
- Opened: 22 October 1910, 1:32 PM
- Closed: 1993
- Demolished: 1993
- Architect: Archibald Leitch

Tenant
- Millwall F.C. (1910–1993)

The Old Den (known while in use as the Den) was the fifth football stadium occupied by Millwall F.C. in Cold Blow Lane, New Cross, London since their formation in Millwall on the Isle of Dogs in 1885 before moving to the New Den (now called the Den), in May 1993. The ground opened in 1910 and was the home of Millwall for 83 years. It boasted a record attendance of 48,672 (v Derby County in 1937). Millwall played a total of 1788 games at the Den in all competitions, winning 976, losing 360 and with 452 drawn.

== History ==
Millwall moved to the Den from North Greenwich in 1910, the location of their fourth and final grounds on the Isle Of Dogs in the 25 years since their formation as a football club. Tom Thorne, the director in charge, had sought the help of architect Archibald Leitch and builders Humphries of Knightsbridge. The estimated cost of the Den was £15,000. The first match was on Saturday 22 October 1910 against Brighton & Hove Albion, the Southern League Champions who spoiled the celebrations by winning 1–0. The price of the official Match Programme was one penny. Unfortunately, the opening ceremony also suffered a slight hitch when it was discovered that Lord Kinnaird had inadvertently gone to the Canterbury (Ilderton) Road end. He had to be unceremoniously hauled, pushed, and pulled over the wall into the ground. After rushing to the other end (Cold Blow Lane) the President of the FA performed a brief opening ritual and led the players onto the pitch. Before kick off, a brass lion inscribed (in Gaelic) "We Will Never Turn Our Backs to the Enemy", was presented to the club. Many supporters from the East End of London continued to (and many still do) follow the Lions after their move south of the River Thames, walking through the Greenwich foot tunnel and the Rotherhithe Tunnel to join the supporters from nearer the Den, mainly in the Surrey Docks area.

Millwall's first Football League match at the Den was on 28 August 1920. They beat Bristol Rovers 2–0. This victory over Rovers was the Lions' seventh successive win against them since moving to the Den. The game was played in the Football League Division 3 South of which Millwall were founder members. In this year, Millwall scored 83 goals at the Den. This is still a Football League record.

Being in close proximity to the Surrey Commercial Docks, the Den sustained severe bomb damage during the Blitz and a German bomb hit the North Terrace on 19 April 1943. On 26 April, a fire destroyed the Main Stand. The club accepted offers from neighbours Charlton Athletic, Crystal Palace and West Ham United to stage games. On 24 February 1944 Millwall returned to the Den, to play in an all-standing stadium. This was achieved, in part, with considerable volunteer labour by the Lions' fans.

After the war, rationing in Great Britain continued and Millwall were refused permission by the Ministry of Works to construct a new two-tier stand, despite having procured all the materials. They had to wait until 1948, when permission was granted to build a smaller, single-tier stand two-thirds the length of the pitch, with a forecourt terrace at the front. Leitch's trademark gables were never replaced.

On 5 October 1953, Millwall played Manchester United to mark the opening of their floodlights. A crowd of 25,000 saw the Lions beat the Red Devils 2–1.

Millwall established a record of 59 home games without defeat at the Den from 22 August 1964 to 14 January 1967. This was thanks largely to managers Billy Gray, who laid the foundations, and Benny Fenton, a former player who continued to build on Gray's side. All the players were presented with a commemorative gold cigarette lighter by the Football Association.

The Den hosted a full England international match against Wales on 13 March 1911. England won the game 3–0. The Den also hosted an England B international, with England beating Yugoslavia B 2–1 on 12 December 1989. Millwall's first and last Football League games at the Den were played against Bristol Rovers – the final game being at the end of the 1992–93 Division One campaign.

By the late 1970s, the Den had fallen into disrepair and there were proposals to build a "Super-Den" on the existing sites of the Den and the adjacent New Cross Stadium, with an anticipated all-seater capacity of between 25,000 and 30,000 – which would have made it the first all-seater stadium in English football. The plan proved very unpopular with fans, culminating in mass demonstrations against Chairman Reg Burr. The club, who were in the Third Division at this stage, could not raise sufficient funds to pay for the ambitious project and it eventually fell through.

In November 1985, the club's chief executive Tony Shaw suggested that the club might be forced to move to a new stadium and possibly even change its name in an attempt to tackle the club's growing reputation for football hooliganism, which had been highlighted earlier that year following a particularly serious string of incidents when Millwall played Luton Town in an FA Cup tie.

The stadium hosted First Division football from 1988 to 1990, but within a year of Millwall's relegation it was confirmed that the club would be moved to a new 25,000-seat stadium at Senegal Fields. There had been plans for the old Den to be converted into an all-seater stadium, but these were abandoned in favour of moving – partly because the new stadium was situated in a more spacious location and also allowed for the development of a sports centre for public use. The stadium was sold to Fairview Homes in December 1991 at a cost of £6.5 million, although the club continued to play there for nearly 18 months afterwards. The club moved to the New Den, with a capacity of just over 20,000, in August 1993. The old stadium was demolished that autumn. The site is now occupied by housing.

The site and surrounding area are now known to locals as "Little Millwall" and Millwall fans still make the trip by foot from New Cross Gate station through the area to the all-seater New Den in Bermondsey.
