= List of Millwall F.C. seasons =

All seasons played by Millwall Football Club

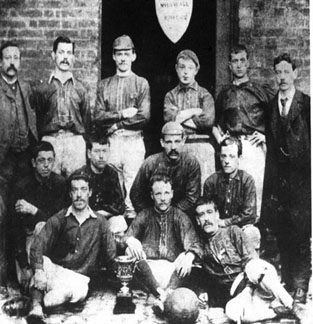
Millwall Rovers in 1887, the first season they entered the FA Cup.

This is a list of all seasons played by Millwall Football Club from their early beginnings in the Southern League, to their inaugural season in the English Football League and up to their last completed season. It details their record in the FA Cup, the League Cup and other major competitions entered, as well as managers, top goalscorers and average home attendance for each season.

Millwall were founded in 1885 and for the first nine years of their existence did not compete in league football. They first entered the FA Cup in 1887, turning full-time professional as a club in 1893. They were founding members of the Southern League in 1894, which they competed in for 22 seasons, claiming the title twice in 1895 and 1896. They left to join the Football League in the 1920–21 season. Millwall have played in all four divisions during their 100 consecutive seasons in the league, including the Third Division South, which they won twice, in 1928 and 1938. They were Fourth Division champions in 1962. The 1988–89 season stands as The Lions most successful when Millwall reached the top tier of English football, where they finished 10th in their first ever season in the First Division, after being promoted as champions of the Second Division in 1988. Their lowest league finish is 9th in the founding season of the Fourth Division in 1958–59. Millwall were Second Division champions in the 2000–01 season, when they finished with their highest ever points total of 93. Millwall have been promoted eleven times (five as champions) and relegated nine times. Millwall have reached the Football League play-offs nine times. They were play-off semi-finalists in 1991, 1994, 2000, 2002, 2026, finalists in 2009 and 2016, and they were promoted as winners in 2010 and 2017.

Millwall Performances from 1920 until 2023

They reached the 2004 FA Cup Final, losing to Manchester United, but still qualified for the UEFA Europa League the following season, playing in Europe for the first time in their history. They have also reached the FA Cup quarter-finals on eleven occasions, and the semi-finals four times; in 1900, 1903, 1937 and 2013. Millwall have reached the quarter-finals of the League Cup on three occasions, in 1974, 1977 and 1995. The Lions won the Football League Group Cup in 1983 and were runners up in the Football League Trophy in 1999.

Teddy Sheringham, Peter Burridge, and Richard Parker hold the record for most goals scored in a season with 38, which they set in the 1990-91 season, 1960–61 season, and 1926–27 season respectively. Millwall's highest average home attendance is 27,373, which they set in the 1938–39 season just before the Second World War broke out.

== Seasons ==
=== Overall ===
As of the 2026–27 season, Millwall have spent 100 consecutive seasons in the Football League.

- Seasons spent at Level 1 of the football league system: 2
- Seasons spent at Level 2 of the football league system: 50
- Seasons spent at Level 3 of the football league system: 43
- Seasons spent at Level 4 of the football league system: 5

Season	∆	Division	Pos	∆	Pld	W	D	L	GF	GA	GD	Pts	League Cup	FA Cup	Other competitions		Manager(s)	Top goalscorer(s)		Att.
1885–86															East London FA Cup	W	Committee / Captain (Note: Millwall's first team manager was director Fred Kidd in 1890, during the first five years of their existence from 1885–1890 the team captain and committee of directors were considered joint managers.)			
1886–87															East London Senior Cup	W	Committee / Captain			
1887–88														2Q	East London Senior Cup	W	Committee / Captain			
1888–89														1Q	East London Senior Cup	W	Committee / Captain			
1889–90														1Q			Fred Kidd^{(s)}			
1890–91														1Q			Fred Kidd^{(s)}			
1891–92														2Q			Fred Kidd^{(s)}			
1892–93														3Q			Fred Kidd^{(s)}			
1893–94														3Q			Fred Kidd^{(s)}			
1894–95		SL	1st		16	12	4	0	68	29	+39	28		1R			Fred Kidd^{(s)}	Archibald McKenzie	21	5,375
1895–96		SL	1st		18	16	1	1	75	16	+59	33		1R			Fred Kidd^{(s)}	Charlie Leatherbarrow	20	3,444
1896–97		SL	2nd		20	13	5	2	63	24	+39	31		1R	United League	1st	Fred Kidd^{(s)}	John Calvey	33	3,350
1897–98		SL	9th		22	8	2	12	48	45	+3	18		3Q	United League	7th	Fred Kidd^{(s)}	John Calvey	18	3,454
1898–99		SL	3rd		24	12	6	6	59	35	+24	30		4Q	United League	1st	Fred Kidd^{(s)}	John Calvey	33	5,292
1899–1900		SL	7th		28	12	3	13	36	37	-1	27		SF	Southern Combination	1st	Edward Stopher^{(s)}	Herbert Banks	26	6,821
1900–01		SL	4th		28	17	2	9	55	32	+23	36		1R	Western League	7th	George Saunders^{(s)}	Herbert Banks	25	6,286
1901–02		SL	6th		30	13	6	11	48	31	+17	32		Int	Western League	4th	George Saunders^{(s)}	Ben Hulse	22	5,167
1902–03		SL	7th		30	14	3	13	52	37	+15	31		SF	Western League	5th	George Saunders^{(s)}	Ben Hulse	32	6,533
1903–04		SL	7th		34	16	8	10	64	42	+22	40		1R	London League	1st	George Saunders^{(s)}	William Maxwell	34	6,882
1904–05		SL	15th		34	11	7	16	38	47	-9	29		1R	Western League	6th	George Saunders^{(s)}	William Maxwell	23	5,941
1905–06		SL	12th		34	11	11	12	38	41	-3	33		2R	Western League	6th	George Saunders^{(s)}	Percy Milsom	17	6,588
1906–07		SL	7th		38	18	6	14	71	50	+21	42		2R	Western League	6th	George Saunders^{(s)}	Alf Twigg	28	6,632
1907–08		SL	3rd		38	19	8	11	49	32	+17	46		1R	Western League	1st	George Saunders^{(s)}	Alf Twigg	30	7,368
1908–09		SL	12th		40	16	6	18	59	62	-3	38		3R	Western League	1st	George Saunders^{(s)}	Alf Twigg	17	7,000
1909–10		SL	16th		42	15	7	20	45	59	-14	37		1R			George Saunders^{(s)}	Jack Martin	12	5,857
1910–11		SL	15th		38	11	9	18	42	54	-12	31		1R			Bert Lipsham	Jack Martin	14	10,611
1911–12		SL	8th		38	15	10	13	60	57	+3	40		1R			Bert Lipsham	Wally Davis	15	12,021
1912–13		SL	6th		38	19	7	12	62	43	+19	45		1R	Southern Alliance	4th	Bert Lipsham	Wally Davis	33	15,684
1913–14		SL	15th		38	11	12	15	51	56	-5	34		3R			Bert Lipsham	Wally Davis	28	15,642
1914–15		SL	8th		38	16	10	12	50	51	-1	42		3R			Bert Lipsham	Wally Davis	23	7,789
The Football League and FA Cup were suspended between 1915 and 1919 due to the First World War.
1919–20		SL	14th		42	14	12	16	52	55	-3	40		1R			Bob Hunter	Jimmy Broad	33	12,952
1920–21	3	Div 3	7th	51st	42	18	11	13	42	30	+12	47		1R			Bob Hunter	William J. Keen	10	18,762
1921–22	3	Div 3(S)	12th	56th	42	10	18	14	38	42	-4	38		QF			Bob Hunter	William J. Keen	16	17,524
1922–23	3	Div 3(S)	6th	50th	42	14	18	10	45	40	+5	46		2R			Bob Hunter	Harry Morris	17	17,238
1923–24	3	Div 3(S)	3rd	47th	42	22	10	10	64	38	+26	54		1R			Bob Hunter	Harry Morris	19	16,671
1924–25	3	Div 3(S)	5th	49th	42	18	13	11	58	38	+20	49		1R			Bob Hunter	Alf Moule	18	15,286
1925–26	3	Div 3(S)	3rd	47th	42	21	11	10	73	39	+24	53		5R			Bob Hunter	Alf Moule	19	14,953
1926–27	3	Div 3(S)	3rd	47th	42	23	10	9	89	51	+38	56		QF			Bob Hunter	Richard Parker	38	14,173
1927–28	3	Div 3(S)	1st ↑	45th	42	30	5	7	127	50	+77	65		3R	London Challenge Cup	W	Bob Hunter	Jack Landells	34	17,690
1928–29	2	Div 2	14th	36th	42	16	7	19	71	86	-15	39		4R			Bob Hunter	Jack Cock	29	20,306
1929–30	2	Div 2	14th	36th	42	12	15	15	57	73	-16	39		5R			Bob Hunter	Jack Cock	18	18,685
1930–31	2	Div 2	14th	36th	42	16	7	19	71	80	-9	39		3R			Bob Hunter	Jack Cock	15	14,455
1931–32	2	Div 2	9th	31st	42	17	9	16	61	61	+0	43		3R			Bob Hunter	Leslie Smith	17	14,073
1932–33	2	Div 2	7th	29th	42	16	11	15	59	57	+2	43		4R			Bob Hunter	George Bond	17	13,807
1933–34	2	Div 2	21st ↓	43rd	42	11	11	20	39	68	-29	33		4R			Billy McCracken	Jimmy Yardley	9	14,377
1934–35	3	Div 3(S)	12th	56th	42	17	7	18	57	62	-5	41		4R			Billy McCracken	Jimmy Yardley	18	11,021
1935–36	3	Div 3(S)	12th	56th	42	14	12	16	58	71	-13	40		3R			Billy McCracken	Jimmy McCartney	13	10,561
1936–37	3	Div 3(S)	8th	52nd	42	18	10	14	64	65	+10	46		SF			Charlie Hewitt	Ken Burditt	25	19,010
1937–38	3	Div 3(S)	1st ↑	45th	42	23	10	9	83	37	+46	56		3R			Charlie Hewitt	Dave Mangnall	20	22,756
1938–39	2	Div 2	13th	35th	42	14	14	14	64	53	+11	42		4R			Charlie Hewitt	Sid Rawlings	14	27,373
The Football League and FA Cup were suspended during the Second World War. The FA Cup returned in 1945 and League football in 1946.
1945–46														4R			Jack Cock			
1946–47	2	Div 2	18th	40th	42	14	8	20	56	79	-23	36		3R			Jack Cock	Johnny Johnson	10	22,211
1947–48	2	Div 2	22nd ↓	44th	42	9	11	22	44	74	-30	29		3R			Jack Cock	Willie Hurrell	7	21,748
1948–49	3	Div 3(S)	8th	52nd	42	17	11	14	63	64	-1	45		2R			Charlie Hewitt	Jimmy Constantine	25	24,644
1949–50	3	Div 3(S)	22nd	66th	42	14	4	24	55	63	-8	32		1R			Charlie Hewitt	Jimmy Constantine	14	20,883
1950–51	3	Div 3(S)	5th	49th	46	23	10	13	80	57	+23	56		4R			Charlie Hewitt	Jimmy Constantine	28	20,078
1951–52	3	Div 3(S)	4th	48th	46	23	12	11	74	53	+21	58		2R			Charlie Hewitt	Frank Neary	15	20,184
1952–53	3	Div 3(S)	2nd	46th	46	24	14	8	82	44	+38	62		3R			Charlie Hewitt	Johnny Shepherd	21	19,114
1953–54	3	Div 3(S)	12th	56th	46	19	9	18	74	77	-3	47		2R			Charlie Hewitt	George Stobbart	20	13,484
1954–55	3	Div 3(S)	5th	49th	46	20	11	15	72	68	+4	51		3R			Charlie Hewitt	Dennis Pacey	15	13,921
1955–56	3	Div 3(S)	22nd	66th	46	15	6	25	83	100	-17	36		1R			Charlie Hewitt, Ron Gray	Johnny Summers	24	9,191
1956–57	3	Div 3(S)	17th	61st	46	16	12	18	64	84	-20	44		5R			Ron Gray	Johnny Shepherd	24	11,443
1957–58	3	Div 3(S)	23rd (Note: Millwall were placed in the newly formed Fourth Division for the 1958–59 season due to the Football League restructering and de-regionalisation of Third Division North and Third Division South.)	67th	46	11	9	26	63	91	-28	31		2R			Ron Gray; Jimmy Seed	Johnny Shepherd	12	12,257
1958–59	4	Div 4	9th	77th	46	20	10	16	76	69	+7	50		2R			Jimmy Seed	Ron Heckman	12	11,647
1959–60	4	Div 4	5th	73rd	46	18	17	11	84	61	+23	53		1R			Reg Smith	Alf Ackerman	18	14,447
1960–61	4	Div 4	6th	74th	46	21	8	17	97	86	+11	50	1R	1R			Reg Smith, Ron Gray	Peter Burridge	38	9,544
1961–62	4	Div 4	1st ↑	69th	44	23	10	11	87	62	+25	56	1R	1R			Ron Gray	Peter Burridge	24	11,583
1962–63	3	Div 3	16th	60th	46	15	13	18	82	87	-5	43	1R	2R			Ron Gray	Pat Terry	19	13,206
1963–64	3	Div 3	21st ↓	65th	46	14	10	22	53	67	-14	38	4R	1R			Ron Gray, Billy Gray	Pat Terry	13	10,443
1964–65	4	Div 4	2nd ↑	70th	46	23	16	7	78	45	+33	62	2R	4R			Billy Gray	Hugh Curran	19	9,178
1965–66	3	Div 3	2nd ↑	46th	46	27	11	8	76	43	+33	65	4R	2R			Billy Gray	Len Julians	24	13,919
1966–67	2	Div 2	8th	30th	42	18	9	15	49	58	-9	45	1R	3R			Benny Fenton	Len Julians	17	16,112
1967–68	2	Div 2	7th	29th	42	14	17	11	62	50	+12	45	4R	3R			Benny Fenton	Keith Weller	14	13,474
1968–69	2	Div 2	10th	32nd	42	17	9	16	57	49	+8	43	3R	4R			Benny Fenton	Derek Possee	16	16,343
1969–70	2	Div 2	10th	32nd	42	15	14	13	56	56	+0	44	2R	3R			Benny Fenton	Derek Possee	19	11,672
1970–71	2	Div 2	8th	30th	42	19	9	14	59	42	+17	47	3R	3R			Benny Fenton	Derek Possee	17	9,835
1971–72	2	Div 2	3rd	25th	42	19	17	6	64	46	+18	55	2R	4R			Benny Fenton	Derek Possee	17	16,210
1972–73	2	Div 2	11th	33rd	42	16	10	16	55	47	+8	42	4R	5R			Benny Fenton	Gordon Bolland; Alf Wood	19	10,258
1973–74	2	Div 2	12th	34th	42	14	14	14	51	51	+0	42	QF	3R			Benny Fenton	Alf Wood	23	9,486
1974–75	2	Div 2	20th ↓	42nd	42	10	12	20	44	56	-12	32	1R	3R			Benny Fenton, Gordon Jago	Phil Summerill	7	8,550
1975–76	3	Div 3	3rd ↑	47th	46	20	16	10	54	43	+11	56	2R	2R			Gordon Jago	Phil Summerill	10	7,667
1976–77	2	Div 2	10th	32nd	42	15	13	14	57	53	+4	43	QF	3R			Gordon Jago	John Seasman	16	10,590
1977–78	2	Div 2	16th	38th	42	12	14	16	49	57	-8	38	3R	QF			Gordon Jago, Theo Foley^{(c)}, George Petchey	Ian Pearson	13	8,096
1978–79	2	Div 2	21st ↓	43rd	42	11	10	21	42	61	-19	32	2R	3R			George Petchey	John Seasman	10	7,021
1979–80	3	Div 3	14th	58th	46	16	13	17	65	59	+6	45	1R	4R			George Petchey	John Lyons	21	6,000
1980–81	3	Div 3	16th	60th	46	14	14	18	43	60	-17	42	1R	2R			George Petchey, Terry Long^{(c)}, Peter Anderson	Nicky Chatterton	9	4,495
1981–82	3	Div 3	9th	53rd	46	18	13	15	62	62	+0	67	2R	3R			Peter Anderson	Dean Horrix	18	4,625
1982–83	3	Div 3	17th	61st	46	14	13	19	64	77	-13	55	1R	1R	Football League Group Cup	W	Peter Anderson, Barry Kitchener^{(c)}, George Graham	Dean Neal	25	4,010
1983–84	3	Div 3	9th	53rd	46	18	13	15	71	65	+6	67	2R	2R	Associate Members Cup	RU	George Graham	Dean Neal	19	4,384
1984–85	3	Div 3	2nd ↑	46th	46	26	12	8	73	42	+31	90	2R	QF	Associate Members Cup	3R	George Graham	Steve Lovell	27	6,467
1985–86	2	Div 2	9th	31st	42	17	8	17	64	65	-1	59	2R	5R	Full Members Cup	2R	George Graham	Steve Lovell	19	5,474
1986–87	2	Div 2	16th	38th	42	14	9	19	39	45	-6	51	3R	3R	Full Members Cup	2R	John Docherty	Teddy Sheringham	16	4,460
1987–88	2	Div 2	1st ↑	22nd	44	25	7	12	72	52	+20	82	2R	3R	Full Members Cup	3R	John Docherty	Teddy Sheringham	24	8,433
1988–89	1	Div 1	10th	10th	38	14	11	13	47	52	-5	53	3R	4R	Full Members Cup	3R	John Docherty	Tony Cascarino; Teddy Sheringham	15	15,468
1989–90	1	Div 1	20th ↓	20th	38	5	11	22	39	65	-26	26	3R	4R	Full Members Cup	2R	John Docherty, Bob Pearson^{(c)}, Bruce Rioch	Teddy Sheringham	12	12,427
1990–91	2	Div 2	5th	25th	46	20	13	13	70	51	+19	73	3R	4R	Full Members Cup	2R	Bruce Rioch	Teddy Sheringham	38	10,841
1991–92	2	Div 2	15th	37th	46	17	10	19	64	71	-7	61	2R	4R	Full Members Cup	2R	Bruce Rioch, Mick McCarthy	Jamie Moralee	15	7,907
1992–93	2	Div 1 (Note: Upon its formation for the 1992–93 season, the FA Premier League became the top tier of English football; the First, Second and Third Divisions then became the second, third and fourth tiers, respectively.)	7th	29th	46	18	16	12	65	53	+12	70	2R	3R	Anglo-Italian Cup	Grp	Mick McCarthy	Alex Rae	10	9,189
1993–94	2	Div 1	3rd	25th	46	19	17	10	58	49	+9	74	2R	3R	Anglo-Italian Cup	Grp	Mick McCarthy	Alex Rae	13	9,823
1994–95	2	Div 1	13th	35th	46	16	14	16	60	60	+0	62	QF	5R			Mick McCarthy	Alex Rae	10	7,687
1995–96	2	Div 1	22nd ↓	42nd	46	13	13	20	43	63	-20	52	3R	3R			Mick McCarthy, Jimmy Nicholl	Alex Rae	16	9,559
1996–97	3	Div 2	14th	58th	46	16	13	17	50	55	-5	61	1R	1R	Football League Trophy	2R	Jimmy Nicholl, John Docherty	Stephen Crawford	15	7,753
1997–98	3	Div 2	18th	62nd	46	14	13	19	43	54	-11	55	2R	1R	Football League Trophy	2R	Billy Bonds	Paul Shaw	13	7,022
1998–99	3	Div 2	10th	54th	46	17	11	18	52	59	-7	62	1R	1R	Football League Trophy	RU	Keith Stevens	Neil Harris	18	6,958
1999–2000	3	Div 2	5th	49th	46	23	13	10	76	50	+26	83	1R	1R	Football League Trophy	1R	Keith Stevens & Alan McLeary	Neil Harris	25	9,262
2000–01	3	Div 2	1st ↑	45th	46	28	9	9	89	38	+51	93	2R	2R	Football League Trophy	2R	Keith Stevens & Alan McLeary, Steve Gritt^{(c)} & Ray Harford^{(c)}, Mark McGhee	Neil Harris	28	11,442
2001–02	2	Div 1	4th	24th	46	22	11	13	69	48	+21	77	2R	4R			Mark McGhee	Steve Claridge	18	13,380
2002–03	2	Div 1	9th	29th	46	19	9	18	59	69	-10	66	1R	4R			Mark McGhee	Steve Claridge; Neil Harris	12	8,512
2003–04	2	Div 1	10th	30th	46	18	15	13	55	48	+7	69	1R	RU			Mark McGhee, Dennis Wise	Tim Cahill	12	10,500
2004–05	2	Champ	10th	30th	46	18	12	16	51	45	+6	66	3R	3R	UEFA Europa League	1R	Dennis Wise	Barry Hayles	12	11,656
2005–06	2	Champ	23rd ↓	43rd	46	8	16	22	35	62	-27	40	2R	3R			Steve Claridge, Colin Lee, Dave Tuttle, Tony Burns^{(c)} & Alan McLeary^{(c)}	Ben May	11	9,529
2006–07	3	Lge 1	10th	54th	46	19	9	18	59	62	-3	66	2R	3R	Football League Trophy	QF	Nigel Spackman, Willie Donachie	Darren Byfield	16	9,234
2007–08	3	Lge 1	17th	61st	46	14	10	22	45	61	-16	52	1R	4R	Football League Trophy	1R	Willie Donachie, Richard Shaw^{(c)} & Colin West^{(c)}, Kenny Jackett	Gary Alexander; Jay Simpson	8	8,669
2008–09	3	Lge 1	5th	49th	46	25	7	14	63	53	+10	82	1R	4R	Football League Trophy	1R	Kenny Jackett	Gary Alexander	15	8,940
2009–10	3	Lge 1	3rd ↑	47th	46	24	13	9	76	44	+32	85	2R	3R	Football League Trophy	1R	Kenny Jackett	Steve Morison	23	10,835
2010–11	2	Champ	9th	29th	46	18	13	15	62	46	+14	67	3R	3R			Kenny Jackett	Steve Morison	17	12,438
2011–12	2	Champ	16th	36th	46	15	12	19	55	57	-2	57	3R	5R			Kenny Jackett	Darius Henderson	19	11,484
2012–13	2	Champ	20th	40th	46	15	11	20	51	62	-11	56	1R	SF			Kenny Jackett	Chris Wood	11	10,559
2013–14	2	Champ	19th	39th	46	11	15	20	46	74	-28	48	2R	3R			Steve Lomas, Neil Harris^{(c)} & Scott Fitzgerald^{(c)}, Ian Holloway	Martyn Woolford	9	10,848
2014–15	2	Champ	22nd ↓	42nd	46	9	14	23	42	76	-34	41	2R	3R			Ian Holloway, Neil Harris	Lee Gregory	9	10,902
2015–16	3	Lge 1	4th	48th	46	24	9	13	73	49	+24	81	1R	3R	Football League Trophy	F(S)	Neil Harris	Lee Gregory	27	9,009
2016–17	3	Lge 1	6th ↑	50th	46	20	13	13	66	57	+9	73	2R	QF	Football League Trophy	2R	Neil Harris	Steve Morison	19	9,339
2017–18	2	Champ	8th	28th	46	19	15	12	56	45	+11	72	2R	4R			Neil Harris	Lee Gregory; George Saville	10	13,368
2018–19	2	Champ	21st	41st	46	10	14	22	48	64	-16	44	3R	QF			Neil Harris	Lee Gregory	13	13,624
2019–20	2	Champ	8th	28th	46	17	17	12	57	51	+5	68	2R	4R			Neil Harris, Gary Rowett	Matt Smith	14	13,734
2020–21	2	Champ	11th	31st	46	15	17	14	47	52	-5	62	3R	4R			Gary Rowett	Jed Wallace	11	2,000 (Note: Due to COVID-19 restrictions in the UK, Millwall played 21 of their 23 home games behind closed doors without fans. They only played two games with fans, and there was a limit of 2,000 allowed to attend.)
2021–22	2	Champ	9th	29th	46	18	15	13	53	45	+8	69	3R	3R			Gary Rowett	Benik Afobe	13	12,970
2022–23	2	Champ	8th	28th	46	19	11	16	57	50	+7	68	1R	3R			Gary Rowett	Tom Bradshaw	17	14,767
2023–24	2	Champ	13th	33rd	46	16	11	19	45	55	-10	59	1R	3R			Gary Rowett, Joe Edwards, Neil Harris	Zian Flemming	8	16,540
2024–25	2	Champ	8th	28th	46	18	12	16	47	49	-2	66	2R	5R			Neil Harris, David Livermore, Alex Neil	Mihailo Ivanović	13	15,339
2025–26	2	Champ	3rd	23rd	46	24	11	11	64	49	+15	83	3R	3R			Alex Neil	Femi Azeez	11	17,135
Season	∆	Division	Pos	∆	Pld	W	D	L	GF	GA	GD	Pts	League Cup	FA Cup	Other competitions		Manager(s)	Top goalscorer(s)		Att.

=== Key ===
English Football League tier:

First	Second	Third	Fourth	Southern League (non-league)

Finishing position and cup competitions:

1st or Winners	2nd or Runners-up	Third-place	Play-offs	Playoff winners	↑ (Promoted)	↓ (Relegated)

Key to league record

- ∆ = Tier on Football League pyramid
- Pos = Final position
- ∆ = Final league placing in pyramid
- Pld = Matches played
- W = Matches won
- D = Matches drawn
- L = Matches lost
- GF = Goals for
- GA = Goals against
- GD = Goal difference
- Pts = Points

Key to divisions

- Champ = EFL Championship
- Lge 1 = EFL League One
- Div 1 = Football League First Division
- Div 2 = Football League Second Division
- Div 3 = Football League Third Division
- Div 3(S) = Football League Third Division South
- Div 4 = Football League Fourth Division
- SL = Southern Football League Division One

Key to rounds

- Grp = Group stage
- 1Q = Qualifying round 1
- 2Q = Qualifying round 2
- 3Q = Qualifying round 3
- 4Q = Qualifying round 4
- 5Q = Qualifying round 5
- Int = Intermediate round
- 1R = 1st Round
- 2R = 2nd Round
- 3R = 3rd Round
- 4R = 4th Round
- 5R = 5th Round
- 6R = 6th Round
- QF = Quarter-finals
- SF = Semi-finals
- F(S) = Southern area final
- RU = Runners-up
- W = Winners

Key to managers

- (s) = Secretary
- (c) = Caretaker manager
- & = denotes joint-managers

Key to Average attendance

- Avg. Att. = Average attendance for all home league games only.

== See also ==
- List of Millwall F.C. records and statistics
- History of Millwall F.C.
