= List of Millwall F.C. records and statistics =

This list encompasses the honours won by Millwall Football Club and records set by the club, their managers and their players. The record by competition section includes every competitive first team game Millwall have played since their inception in 1885. The player records section includes details of the club's leading goalscorers and those who have made most appearances in first-team competitions, as well transfer records and attendances records.

== Player records ==
Barry Kitchener holds the record for Millwall appearances, having played 596 matches between 1966 and 1982. The goalscoring record is held by Neil Harris, with 138 in all competitions. He broke the previous record of 111 goals, held by Teddy Sheringham on 13 January 2009, during a 3–2 away win at Crewe Alexandra. The club's widest victory margin in the league is 9–1, a scoreline which they achieved twice in their Football League Third Division South championship-winning year of 1927. They beat both Torquay United and Coventry City by this score at The Den. Millwall's heaviest league defeat was 8–1 away to Plymouth Argyle in 1932. The club's heaviest loss in all competitions was a 9–1 defeat at Aston Villa in an FA Cup fourth-round second-leg in 1946. Millwall's largest Cup win was 7–0 over Gateshead in 1936. Their highest scoring aggregate game was a 12-goal thriller at home to Preston North End in 1930 when Millwall lost 7–5.

As of February 2026

Appearances

- Players in **bold** denotes still playing for the club.
1. **596** Barry Kitchener (1966–82)
2. **557** Keith Stevens (1980–99)
3. **443** Harry Cripps (1961–74)
4. **431** Neil Harris (1998–04, 2007–11)
5. **418** **Jake Cooper** (2017-)
6. **413** Alan McLeary (1981-93, 1997-99)
7. **387** Alan Dunne (2000–2015)
8. **361** Paul Robinson (2001–2015)
9. **343** Jimmy Forsyth (1929–39)
10. **342** Jimmy Abdou (2008–2018)

Goals

- Only Football League and senior cup competitions included.
1. **138** Neil Harris (1998–04, 2007–11)
2. **111** Teddy Sheringham (1982–91)
3. **92** Steve Morison (2009–11, 2013–14, 2015–19)
4. **87** Derek Possee (1967–73)
5. **83** Jack Cock (1927–31)
6. **80** Jimmy Constantine (1948–52)
7. **78** Johnny Shepherd (1952–58)
8. **77** Lee Gregory (2014–19)
9. **74** David Jones (1959–64)
10. **71** Jack Landells (1925–33)
11. **71** Alex Rae (1990–96)

- Most goals in a season:

Richard Parker – 37 League goals (38 in all competitions, Third Division South 1926–27)

Teddy Sheringham – 33 League goals (38 in all competitions, Football League Second Division 1990-91)

- Youngest player:

Moses Ashikodi – Fifteen years and 240 days. (22 February 2003)

Regan Anderson (second-youngest) – Fifteen years, nine months and 28 days. (8 September 2026)

=== Transfers ===
- Biggest Transfer fee paid: Josh Coburn – £5,000,000 from Middlesbrough
- Biggest Transfer fee received: Romain Esse – £14,500,000 to Crystal Palace

== Record by competition ==
This table includes all competitive first team games played throughout Millwall's history in all league and cup competitions. It excludes all pre-season games, friendlies, abandoned matches, testimonials and games played during World War I & II.

=== Key ===
- The season given as "first" denotes the season in which Millwall first played in the league or cup competition. The season given as "last" denotes the season in which Millwall last played in the league or cup competition. Italicised denotes that Millwall are currently participating in the competition.
- P = matches played; W = matches won; D = matches drawn; L = matches lost; F = goals for; A = goals against; +/- = goals against subtracted from goals for; Win% = percentage of total matches won.

Statistics are correct as of 22 July 2020.

Competition	P	W	D	L	F	A	+/-	Win%	First	Last
Competition	(Home & Away)				(Goals)				(Span)	
Football League	4110	1603	1086	1421	5739	5394	+345	39.00	1920–21	2019–20
Southern League	708	309	145	254	1185	924	+261	43.64	1894–95	1919–20
FA Cup	347	141	84	123	541	491	+50	40.63	1888–89	2019–20
League Cup	164	64	38	62	519	480	+39	39.02	1960–61	2019–20
Western League	125	58	24	43	206	182	+24	46.4	1900–01	1908–09
London Challenge Cup	51	32	4	15	122	83	+39	62.74	1908–09	1937–38
United League	50	29	8	13	112	68	+44	58	1896–97	1898–99
Football League Trophy^{[a]}	44	25	6	13	80	48	+32	56.81	1983–84	2016–17
London League	30	16	9	5	65	35	+30	53.53	1901–02	1903–04
Kent FA Challenge Cup Finals	26	8	8	10	48	47	+1	30.76	1947–48	1976–77
London Professional Footballers Assoc. Charity Fund	23	10	5	8	37	40	-3	43.47	1908–09	1931–32
Football League play-offs	20	6	6	8	20	25	-5	30.00	1990–91	2016–17
Southern Professional Charity Cup	20	8	7	5	35	28	+7	40	1901–02	1907–08
Southern Alliance	16	7	3	6	36	26	+10	43.75	1912–13	1912–13
Southern District Combination	16	12	2	2	30	10	+20	75	1899–00	1899–00
London Senior Cup	15	7	1	7	26	33	-7	46.66	1886–87	1892–93
Full Members' Cup	13	4	4	5	18	20	-2	30.76	1985–86	1991–92
East End Senior Cup	12	10	2	0	34	7	+27	83.33	1886–87	1888–89
Third Division South Cup	12	6	3	3	26	19	+7	50	1934–35	1937–38
Kent Senior Shield	10	7	2	1	28	9	+19	70	1911–12	1913–14
Southern Floodlight Cup	9	2	2	5	17	20	-3	22.22	1955–56	1959–60
Middlesex Senior Cup	8	3	1	4	13	21	-8	37.50	1888–89	1891–92
Luton Charity Cup	7	6	0	1	21	9	+12	85.71	1890–91	1892–93
London Charity Cup	5	3	0	2	9	15	-6	60	1891–92	1892–93
Anglo-Italian Cup	4	0	2	2	4	8	-4	0	1992–93	1993–94
Football League Jubilee Fund	2	0	1	1	1	2	-1	0	1938–39	1938–39
UEFA Cup	2	0	1	1	2	4	-2	0	2004–05	2004–05
Dubonnet Cup	1	0	0	1	0	3	-3	0	1910–11	1910–11
Lincoln Hospital Cup	1	1	0	0	2	1	+1	100	1920–21	1920–21
Total	5839	2377	1442	2021	8976	8057	+919	40.70		

a Associate Members' Cup results are included in Football League Trophy results. From 1992 lower league clubs became Full Members of the league, hence the competition being renamed.

== League history ==
Millwall have played in all four divisions during their 94 consecutive seasons as a member of the Football League, including Division Three South. Since the restructuring of the Football League with a national four-tier system, Millwall's lowest league finish is ninth in the founding season of the Fourth Division in 1958–59. The highest league finish is 10th in the First Division of the 1988–89 season. As of the 2020–21 season, Millwall has spent 94 consecutive seasons in the Football League.

- Seasons spent at Level 1 of the football league system: 2
- Seasons spent at Level 2 of the football league system: 44
- Seasons spent at Level 3 of the football league system: 43
- Seasons spent at Level 4 of the football league system: 5

== Record results ==
=== Wins ===
League:

- 9–1 v Torquay United (Third Division South, 29 August 1927)
- 9–1 v Coventry City (Third Division South, 19 November 1927)

FA Cup:

- 7–0 v Gateshead (12 December 1936)

=== Losses ===
League:

- 1–8 v Plymouth Argyle (Division Two, 16 January 1932)

FA Cup:

- 1–9 v Aston Villa (28 January 1946)

== Honours ==
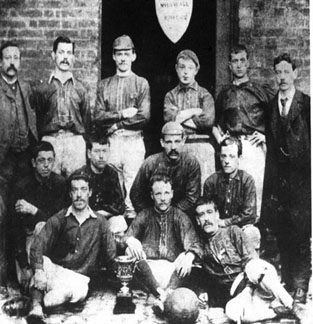
Millwall Rovers with the East London Cup, 1887.

Competition	Achievement	Year	Notes
Second Division (tier 2)	Champions	1988	Promoted to the top flight for the first time in the club's history.
Second Division / First Division (tier 2)	Play-off Semi-Finalists	1991, 1994, 2002, 2026
Third Division South / Second Division (tier 3)	Champions	1928, 1938, 2001	Millwall set an English record in 1928 with 87 league goals scored at home. Finished with 93 points in 2001, a club record.
Third Division (tier 3)	Promoted	1966, 1976, 1985	Unbeaten at home for the second successive season in 1965–66 season. Automatically promoted after finishing third in 1976.
Football League One (tier 3)	Play-off Winners	2010, 2017	Won 1–0 against Swindon Town in 2010 and 1–0 against Bradford City in 2017.
Football League One (tier 3)	Play-off Finalists	2009, 2016
Second Division (tier 3)	Play-off Semi-Finalists	2000
Fourth Division (tier 4)	Champions	1962
Fourth Division (tier 4)	Runners-Up	1965	Finished one point behind the champions Brighton & Hove Albion.
FA Cup	Finalists	2004	Qualified for the UEFA Cup. Game was played at the Millennium Stadium in Cardiff.
FA Cup	Semi-Finalists	1900, 1903, 1937, 2013
FA Cup	Quarter-Finalists	1922, 1927, 1978, 1985, 2017, 2019
League Cup	Quarter-Finalists	1974, 1977, 1995
Football League Trophy	Finalists	1999	First official appearance at Wembley in a recognised competition.
Football League Group Cup	Winners	1983
FA Youth Cup	Winners	1979, 1991
FA Youth Cup	Runners-up	1994
FA Youth Cup	Quarter-Finalists	2020
Football League War Cup	Finalists	1945	South final runners-up.
Third Division South Cup	Winners	1937	Joint winners with Watford (3–3 aggregate in final.)
Kent Senior Shield	Winners	1912, 1913
London Challenge Cup	Winners	1909, 1915, 1928, 1938
Western Football League	Champions	1908, 1909
Southern Football League	Champions	1895, 1896
London League	Champions	1904	Unbeaten with 11 wins and one draw.
United League	Champions	1897, 1899
East London Senior Cup	Winners	1887, 1888, 1889
East London FA Cup	Joint-winners	1886

== Attendances ==
=== Record home attendance ===
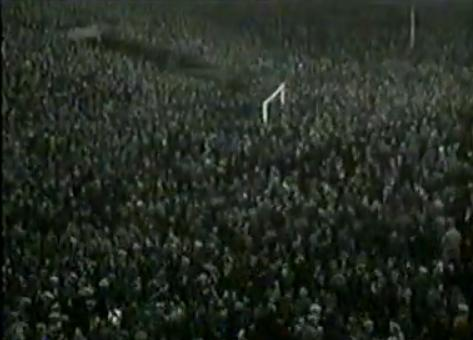
A record crowd of 48,762 stormed the pitch to celebrate after beating Derby County 2–1 at The Den in the 1937 FA Cup.

Their 1937 appearance in the FA Cup was distinguished by the fact they became the first team in the old third division to reach the semi-finals, knocking out three First Division sides on the way, including Derby County who were defeated 2–1 in front of Millwall's official record crowd of 48,762 on 20 February 1937, with hundreds more locked out. The commentator described the crowd surging and swaying like a "wheatfield in the wind."

Millwall are also famous for officially being the 'best supported club' to have played at the old Wembley Stadium. In the 1999 Autowindscreen Shield Final v Wigan Athletic, Millwall had an estimated 48,000 fans supporting them. In the 2008/2009 season Millwall qualified for the League 1 Play Off Final after beating Leeds United over two legs. Drawn against Scunthorpe United, who only brought around 10,000 supporters, Millwall fans were in the majority with around 45,000. This is the best attendance for a domestic team at the new Wembley.

=== Average home attendances ===
Millwall have spent 93 seasons in the Football League (1920–21 to 2019–20), and in that time have averaged an attendance of approximately 12,000, with 25 of those years being played at the current Den and the rest at the Old Den. Just before World War II Millwall averaged their highest attendance of 27,373 and were the tenth best supported club in the country. After the war they continued to attract 20,000+ gates, but the team's fortunes on the pitch began to change for the worse. In the 1950s attendances began to dwindle as the decade drew to a close. Throughout the 1980s Millwall struggled to pull in crowds after home games were made all-ticket after crowd trouble against Leeds United. Often averaging around 4,500 for a season, the club was pushed to the edge of financial extinction. After watching the team struggle for years, promotion to the top flight in 1988 brought supporters back, games are no longer all-ticket and averages since have been just under 10,000.

== Personnel honours ==
=== Player honours ===
==== Football Hall of Fame ====
Millwall players inducted into the (England) English Football Hall of Fame:

- (England) Teddy Sheringham (2009)
- (England) Ray Wilkins (2013)

Millwall players inducted into the (Republic of Ireland) Irish Football Hall of Fame:

- (Republic of Ireland) Tony Cascarino (2015)

Millwall players inducted into the Sport Australia Hall of Fame:

- (Australia) Tim Cahill (2023)

==== PFA Fans' Player of the Year ====
Players awarded the PFA Fans' Player of the Year whilst playing for Millwall:

- (England) Jay Simpson (2008, while on loan from Arsenal. First winner of the award whilst on loan at another club.)

==== PFA Team of the Year ====
Players included in the PFA Team of the Year whilst playing for Millwall:

- (Australia) Tim Cahill (2004)
- (Australia) Tim Cahill (2001)
- (England) Matt Lawrence (2001)
- (England) Neil Harris (2001)
- (Scotland) Alex Rae (1996)
- (Scotland) Alex Rae (1995)
- (Wales) Ben Thatcher (1995)
- (England) Colin Cooper (1993)
- (England) Dave Cusack (1985)
- (England) John Jackson (1980)
- (England) Ray Evans (1976)
- (England) Bryan King (1975)
- (England) Bryan King (1974)

==== EFL Player of the Month ====
Players awarded the EFL Player of the Month whilst playing for Millwall:

- (England) Josh Coburn (Mar 2026) EFL Championship Player of the Month
- (Nigeria) Femi Azeez (Feb 2026) EFL Championship Player of the Month
- (Wales) Tom Bradshaw (Feb 2023) EFL Championship Player of the Month
- (England) Jordan Archer (Feb 2016) EFL League One Player of the Month
- (Republic of Ireland) Aiden O'Brien (Oct 2015) EFL League One Player of the Month
- (Wales) Steve Morison (Mar 2010) EFL League One Player of the Month
- (England) Neil Harris (Feb 2010) EFL League One Player of the Month

=== Manager honours ===
==== Manager of the Month ====
Managers awarded the EFL Manager of the Month whilst managing Millwall:

- (England) Neil Harris (Feb 2017) EFL League One
- (Wales) Kenny Jackett (Nov 2012) EFL Championship
- (Wales) Kenny Jackett (Apr 2012) EFL Championship
- (Wales) Kenny Jackett (Mar 2010) EFL League One
- (Wales) Kenny Jackett (Oct 2009) EFL League One
- (Wales) Kenny Jackett (Sep 2008) EFL League One

==== LMA Hall of Fame ====
Millwall managers inducted into the LMA Hall of Fame for managing over 1,000 professional matches:

- (Republic of Ireland) Mick McCarthy (2025) 1,042 games (207 for Millwall)
- (England) Ian Holloway (2024) 1,070 games (62 for Millwall)

== Football records in England ==
These are records held by Millwall throughout the whole of England.

- Most home league goals scored in a season: 87 (Third Division South, 1927–28)
- Youngest FA Cup finalist: Curtis Weston, 17 years and 119 days
