= History of Millwall F.C. =

History of an English football club

The history of Millwall Football Club, a professional association football club based in Bermondsey, South East London, England, dates back to the club's formation in 1885 as Millwall Rovers.

== Formation of the club ==
The club was founded in 1885 as Millwall Rovers by the workers of J.T. Morton in Millwall on the Isle of Dogs. J.T. Morton had been founded in Aberdeen, Scotland in 1849 to supply sailing ships with food. They opened their first English cannery and food processing plant on the Isle of Dogs at the Millwall dock in 1870, and attracted a workforce from across the whole of the country, including the East Coast of Scotland who were predominantly Dundee dockers. The club secretary was seventeen-year-old Jasper Sexton, the son of the landlord of The Islander Pub in Tooke Street where Millwall held their meetings. The first chairman of the club was local GP Doctor William Murray-Leslie, who surprisingly never played for the club. (Murray-Leslie is sometimes cited as being an Irish international footballer, but this is incorrect, since he was a Scot from Knockbain, Ross-shire and in those days you had to be born in Ireland to represent the IFA, ancestry or residence being insufficient. Consequently, there is no-one of that name registered as having played for Ireland.)

Millwall Rovers' first fixture was in 1885 against Fillebrook, who played in Leytonstone. The newly formed team was well beaten 5–0. Learning from this early defeat, they were unbeaten in their next 12 games before they lost to the top east London side Old St Pauls. In their first season, they were only beaten three times. In November 1886, the East End Football Association was formed, and along with it came a Senior Cup Competition. Millwall made it to the final against London Caledonians. The game was played at the Leyton Cricket Ground. The match finished 2–2 and the teams shared the cup for six months each. During this season, Millwall played two games on the same day, both at home. The first was a 0–0 draw against Dreadnought in the morning; the second, a 4–1 win against Westminster Swifts in the afternoon. Despite an 8–1 defeat in the FA Cup, Millwall went on to win the East London Senior Cup at the first attempt. They went on to win it for the following two years and the trophy became their property.

== Southern League years ==
The club (now playing under the name of Millwall F.C.), went on to become founder members of the Southern League which they won for the first two years of its existence and were runners up in its third. In those days, The Football League was in its infancy and consisted mainly of northern clubs such as Bury, Notts County, Sheffield United and Preston North End. In the south, the Southern League was not only seen as a rival league, but as prestigious. Millwall were also the Western League Champions in 1908 and 1909.

Millwall played on a variety of grounds on the Isle of Dogs. It was not unusual for Millwall to attract thirty or forty thousand spectators to a game, especially at their second ground at East Ferry Road. This was quite an achievement, given that travelling facilities were sparse.

== The Den ==
They are most famous for The Old Den at New Cross, London, which they moved to in 1910. They had previously occupied no fewer than four separate grounds on the Isle Of Dogs in the 25 years since their formation as a football club. Tom Thorne, the director in charge, had sought the help of architect Archibald Leitch and builders Humphries of Knightsbridge. The estimated cost of The Den was £10,000. The first match was on Saturday 22 October 1910 against the reigning Southern League Champions Brighton & Hove Albion, who spoiled the celebrations by winning 0–1. The price of the official Match Programme was one penny. Unfortunately, the opening ceremony also suffered a slight hitch when it was discovered that Lord Kinnaird, had inadvertently gone to the Canterbury (Ilderton) Road end. He had to be unceremoniously hauled, pushed, and pulled over the wall into the ground. After rushing to the other end (Cold Blow Lane) the president of the FA performed a brief opening ritual and led the players onto the pitch. Before kick off a brass lion, inscribed (in Gaelic) "We Will Never Turn Our Backs To The Enemy", was presented to the club. However the official Club Motto was already established. The first and second editions of the club handbook (published 1908–09 and 1909–1910) bore the slogan: "We fear no foe, where e'er we go". It was here that the infamous Millwall Roar was born. During this era, it was considered "good form" for home fans to show their appreciation of good football displayed by the opposition. The Millwall fans however, would quite literally "roar" for only their team, from start to finish. This strongly partisan support was soon to be regarded by the team as "a goal start." The Den became one of the most feared grounds in the country due to the fact no team liked to play there, because the crowd and the place itself created such a stomach-turning atmosphere. Many supporters from the East End of London continued to follow The Lions in the early years after their move south of the River Thames by walking through the Greenwich foot tunnel to join the supporters drawn mainly from the Surrey Docks. The Lions fans were rough, uncompromising, quick to open their mouths to the team and officials. They came from a background of poverty, hard work and danger – where toughness was necessary for survival. Anyone visiting The Den thinking that southerners were soft, soon realised they were in the wrong part of London.

The Den also hosted a full England international match against Wales on 13 March 1911. England won the game 3–0.

== The Football League ==
Millwall's first Football League match at The Den was on 28 August 1920. They beat Bristol Rovers 2–0. This victory over Rovers was the Lions' seventh successive win against them since moving to The Den. The game was played in the Football League Division 3 South of which Millwall were founder members.

They became known as a hard-fighting Cup team and competed in various memorable matches, notably defeating three-time league winners (and reigning champions) Huddersfield Town 3–1 in the third round of the FA Cup in 1927. Matches against Derby County, Sunderland and others that saw packed crowds of forty-eight thousand plus in the 1930s and 1940s. However, it can be argued that the biggest cup upset came in the fourth round of the FA Cup on 26 January 1957, when Millwall beat the then mighty Newcastle 2–1, watched by a crowd of 45,646, at a time when The Lions were fighting for Third Division survival. Millwall were the tenth best supported team in England in the pre-war years, despite being a Third, then Second Division side. Many thought they would go on to become one of England's best clubs, that is until the Second World War cruelly robbed them of their chance. Millwall at this stage, had dropped the title of "Athletic", and were playing as they do today, under the name of "Millwall F.C."

== Wartime exploits ==
On 7 April 1945, Millwall appeared in a Southern FA Cup Final at Wembley against Chelsea, but because it was an unofficial Wartime Cup Final it is not acknowledged in the record books. With the War in Europe in its last days, there was a relaxation on the number of spectators allowed to attend games. The attendance was 90,000, which is the largest crowd Millwall have ever played in front of. Despite being favourites to win, Millwall played poorly and lost 2–0 to Chelsea. To this day Lions fans who were at the game blame the "guest players" in the Millwall side, and Sam Bartram, the Charlton goalkeeper, in particular. Despite having won the Cup which was presented by King George VI, the Chelsea post match celebrations soon "fizzled out", and most of their players ended up at the Millwall party, which continued well into the early hours of the morning.

With the loss of so many young men during the Second World War it was difficult for all clubs to retain their former status. This was especially true for Millwall, who appeared to suffer more than most. From being one of the country's biggest clubs before the war, Millwall were reduced to one of its smallest afterwards. The Den sustained severe bomb damage during The London Blitz. A German bomb hit The North Terrace on 19 April 1943 and on 26 April, a fire destroyed the main stand. The club accepted offers from neighbours Charlton, Crystal Palace and West Ham to stage games. On 24 February 1944 Millwall returned to The Den, to play in an all-standing stadium. This was achieved, in part, with considerable volunteer labour by the Lions fans.

After the war, rationing in Britain continued and Millwall were refused permission by the Ministry of Works to construct a new two tier stand, despite having procured all the materials. They had to wait until 1948, when permission was granted to build a smaller single tier stand two thirds the length of the pitch, with a forecourt terrace at the front. Archibald Leitch's "trademark gables" were never replaced.

== In the doldrums ==
Their form during the 1950s was poor, and they suffered relegation on a regular basis. One highlight during this period was on 5 October 1953, when Millwall played Manchester United to mark the opening of their floodlights. A crowd of 25,000 saw The Lions beat The Red Devils 2–1. In the 1958–59 season, Millwall became founder members of Division Four. It wasn't until the early 1960s that things began to change. During this time, they discovered a number of useful players, such as winger Barry Rowan and goalkeeper Alex Stepney. Stepney later went on to fame with Manchester United, winning a European Cup Winners medal in 1968.

== The class of '71 ==
Later in the decade, Millwall established a record of 59 home games without defeat from: 22 August 1964 to 14 January 1967. This was thanks largely to managers Billy Gray, who laid the foundations, and Benny Fenton, a former player who continued to build on Gray's side. All the players were presented with a commemorative gold cigarette lighter by the Football Association. In the early 1970s Millwall boasted a truly great side, now remembered by Lions fans as "The Class of '71". This was a team that included Harry Cripps, Dennis Burnett, Derek Possee, Barry Kitchener, Eamon Dunphy, Keith Weller, Doug Allder, Alan Dorney, Bryan King, and more. They lost out on promotion to the old Division One by just one point. In 1974 Millwall hosted the first game to be played on a Sunday (against Fulham). To get around the law at the time, admission was gained by "Programme Only". On production of a matchday magazine, the bearer was then sold a team sheet bearing the words "Official Programme". The programme was sold for the same price as admission to the ground. Millwall repeated this exercise against Fulham on 25 April 1982, hosting the second game to be played on a Sunday.

Millwall are also the only club to be unbeaten at home in four different divisions: 1927–28 Division 3 (South), 1964–65 Division Four, 1965–66 Division Three, 1971–72 Division Two, 1984–85 Division Three.

== George Graham ==
George Graham was Millwall manager from 1983 to 1986, and during that time he guided the club to promotion to the Second Division. Millwall also won the Football League Group Trophy, beating Lincoln City 2–3. It was during this game that Graham spotted a talented young Lincoln striker, John Fashanu, who signed for Millwall and was an F.A Cup winner with his next club, Wimbledon. In the 1984–85 season Millwall knocked Leicester out of the FA Cup. This was a Leicester side that boasted Gary Lineker and Alan Smith, but Millwall showed tremendous discipline and ended up winning 2–0. Graham left to begin a successful nine-year spell as Arsenal manager.

Reflecting on his time as the Millwall manager Graham informed the South London Press: "The Millwall fans reminded me of home. The ground may have been a bit spartan, but I soon realised that the fans were in a different class. In fact, their passion for the game reminded me of my days in Glasgow. The people up there are really fanatical about their football, they eat it and sleep it, and the Millwall fans were exactly the same. That was something I wasn't used to, because I thought that in general, southerners were less passionate. I learned so much".

== The First Division at long last ==
Graham's replacement was Glaswegian John Docherty, previously a manager at Brentford and Cambridge United. In his second season as manager, Millwall surprised observers by winning the Second Division championship and gained promotion to the top flight of English football for the first time in their history. Millwall had been the only professional team in London never to have played in the top flight. Docherty stated at the time: "The full enormity of what we had achieved struck home that night as we celebrated with the players and fans. When Frank McLintock and I went into the Royal Archer with the Championship Trophy, I think most of our fans thought that I was a cardboard cut-out! They couldn't believe that we wanted to have a drink with them and let them hold the Trophy, but for me, that sort of moment is what the game is all about". During this season, Millwall were the first club to open a crèche in the Football League. Millwall were also voted "Community Club Of The Year".

Millwall had a good start to the 1988–89 First Division campaign, topping the League on 1 October 1988 having played 6 games- winning 4, drawing 2, losing 0 and rarely being out of the top five before Christmas. This was mainly due to their deadly strike force of Tony Cascarino and Teddy Sheringham, also, Terry Hurlock and team Captain Les Briley who totally dominated the Millwall midfield. Cascarino was signed from Gillingham for £225,000. Sheringham began his professional career at Millwall in 1982 at the age of sixteen, after impressing a scout when playing for Leytonstone & Ilford during a youth team game against Millwall. The first live television transmission of a Millwall game was on 22 January 1989. The TV cameras picked out a banner bearing the slogan "It's Taken You Long Enough To Find The Den!" Viewers were treated to a 5-goal thriller in which Millwall were beaten 2–3 by Norwich City thanks to a spectacular Robert Fleck goal scored deep into injury time against the run of play. During the post match interview, Docherty, instead of criticing the referee's addition of 6 minutes injury time (as the commentary team had done), chose to praise the quality of the young Scot's goal. Millwall's first top division season ended with a tenth-place finish, which was the lowest place occupied by the club all season. They also briefly led the league for one night in September 1989 after beating Coventry 4–1, but won only two more games all season and were relegated in bottom place at the end of the 1989–90 campaign.

== Life outside the top flight ==
Just before relegation was confirmed, John Docherty was sacked and replaced by ex-Middlesbrough manager Bruce Rioch. Striker Teddy Sheringham, who later played for the England team and was the highest scoring player throughout the Football League in 1990–91, was sold to Nottingham Forest for £2,000,000 after Millwall's defeat in the Second Division playoffs.

Rioch left Millwall in 1992 to be succeeded by Irish Defender Mick McCarthy. McCarthy guided Millwall to third place in the new Division One at the end of the 1993–94 season. This was their first season at the new ground, also known as The Den, which was opened by the Labour Party leader John Smith MP on 4 August 1993. They also knocked Arsenal out of the 1994–95 FA Cup in a third round replay, beating them 2–0, with a spectacular goal coming from young Irish midfielder, Mark Kennedy. This was the second consecutive season in which Millwall had drawn Arsenal in the third round of the FA Cup, having lost to them the season before. But they also lost to Derby County in the playoff semi finals that season. Mark Kennedy was sold to Liverpool in March 1995 for £2,300,000. McCarthy resigned to take charge of the Republic of Ireland national team on 5 February 1996, shortly after Millwall had been knocked off the top of the Division One table by Sunderland after a 6–0 defeat. The new ground was the first new football stadium to be built in London since the Second World War.

== Another slump ==
Jimmy Nicholl of Raith Rovers was appointed as McCarthy's replacement, but could not address the slump in form which saw Millwall relegated at the end of the season in 22nd place. Just five months before this they had been top of Division One. Instead Millwall found themselves in Division Two for the 1996–97 season. The club also experienced extreme financial difficulties that resulted in them being placed in financial administration for a short time. Jimmy Nicholl was relieved of his duties and John Docherty returned on a short-term basis to stabilise the club at playing level.

The club came out of administration, and new chairman Theo Paphitis appointed ex-West Ham United (Millwall's bitter rivals) manager Billy Bonds as manager. Paphitis proposed that Millwall should play in grey shirts, but after fans objected he relented and Millwall's home colours became all white, with a blue away strip. He also dispensed with the Rampant Lion crest. An ongoing campaign was launched to have the Rampant Lion restored to the Millwall Shirt. This was not a successful season, with the club hovering close to relegation to the Third Division. Bonds was sacked and replaced by Keith "Rhino" Stevens, with Alan McLeary as his assistant. McLeary was promoted to joint manager. Millwall's blue "home" shirts were reinstated.

Keith Stevens and Alan McLeary led Millwall to their first ever official Wembley appearance. The Lions reached the final with a Golden Goal win against Gillingham in the semi-finals, and a 2–1 aggregate victory over Walsall in the Regional Final. They faced Wigan Athletic in the Auto Windscreens Final. However, Millwall, who were playing in front of 49,000 of their own fans lost by a single injury time goal. Millwall also lost on aggregate to Wigan in the 2nd Division play-off semi finals in 2000.

Early in 2007, members of Millwall Supporters Club voted overwhelmingly for the Rampant Lion to be reintroduced. The Millwall Board agreed to abide by the vote and it has been in use since the start of the 2007/8 season

== Promotion ==
Mark McGhee was named as Millwall's new manager in September 2000, and eight months later the club won promotion as Division Two champions after five years in the lower tier of the league. Winning the first match of the season 4–0 at home to Norwich City set the team up well for a good season in which Millwall qualified for the Division One playoffs, but lost to eventual winners Birmingham City 0–1 in the semi-finals. This meant that they missed out on a second successive promotion, which would have given them a place in the Premiership. Millwall missed out on a playoff place in 2002–03 and McGhee was sacked soon after the start of the 2003–04 season.

== FA Cup final ==
In 2003 Dennis Wise, ex-Chelsea and England player, became caretaker, and subsequently permanent player-manager, of the club. In his first season in charge Wise led the club to the first FA Cup final in their history (excluding the 1945 War Cup Final). When Millwall took to the field at the Millennium Stadium they were only the second team from outside the top flight to play in the final since 1982, and were the first team from outside the Premiership to reach the final since its foundation in 1992. They were also missing no less than sixteen players from their squad due to suspension or injury. They played the Cup final on 22 May 2004, losing 3–0 to Manchester United. As Manchester United had already qualified for the Champions League, Millwall were assured of playing in the 2004/05 UEFA Cup. Millwall midfielder Curtis Weston, substituted for Wise with one minute of normal time remaining, became the youngest Cup Final player in history at 17 years 119 days, beating the 125-year-old record of James F. M. Prinsep. Dennis Wise also insisted that the injured Tony Warner and Kevin Muscat be presented with medals.

== Foray into Europe ==
In the 2004/05 UEFA Cup, Millwall lost 4–2 on aggregate in the first round proper, to Hungarian Champions Ferencváros, with Wise scoring both Millwall goals.

Millwall put up a brave fight in both games, but the Hungarian champions were too strong. Surprisingly, whilst Millwall were seeded, Ferencvaros were not. Millwall could have had an easier draw, against Chechnyan minnows Terek Grozny. If Millwall had beaten them, then they would have made it into the group stage of the competition, where they would have faced some of Europe's elite, including teams such as Lazio and Schalke.

== Change of hands ==
In 2005 Theo Paphitis announced that he was stepping down as chairman of the club with Jeff Burnige to replace him from May 2005. At the end of the 2004–05 season, manager Dennis Wise announced that he was leaving as he was unable to form a working relationship with the new chairman.

== Another change of hands ==
On 21 June 2005 Steve Claridge (Millwall forward 2001–03) was announced as the new player/manager of Millwall FC. However, when Burnige then stepped down just two months after taking up the post, it was announced on 27 July that Claridge had been sacked after 36 days, without ever taking charge of the team in a competitive match.

== A leap into misery ==
Former Watford, Wolves and Walsall manager Colin Lee replaced him but lasted only five months in charge of the club. On 21 December, with the club bottom of the Championship, he became the club's Director of Football and was replaced as manager by 32-year-old player Dave Tuttle, on a short-term contract until the end of the season. Tuttle had no prior experience in football management. In February 2006, Colin Lee left the club altogether. Millwall experienced a very difficult season, possibly as a consequence of having had no fewer than four managers in 2005. Their relegation to League One was confirmed on Monday 17 April 2006 with a 2–0 loss against Southampton.

Ironically, sacked manager Steve Claridge had spoken to BBC Sport on 13 April stating, "I was treated absolutely disgracefully at Millwall, for people to come out and say after I'd gone and say, he had to go, we could have got relegated—well, they have done really well since I left, haven't they?"

Tuttle was unable to save Millwall from relegation to League One and resigned from the job as a result on 20 April 2006. Goalkeeping coach Tony Burns and Alan McLeary took charge for the two remaining games of the season.

Millwall won one and lost one of their two remaining games, with caretaker manager McLeary fielding teams whose average age was just twenty-one. They were officially relegated to League One in 23rd place on Sunday 30 April 2006.

McLeary subsequently left the club, remaining an agent following his testimonial match against Charlton. Burns joined South London rivals Crystal Palace. However, he was recently re-appointed Goalkeeping Coach as part of Kenny Jackett's coaching staff.

On 1 May 2006, the New Den hosted the FA Women's Cup Final between Arsenal L.F.C. and Leeds United L.F.C. Arsenal Ladies won the Cup 5–0.

== A change at the top ==
In March 2006, Millwall appointed their first Fan On The Board (FOTB). After being elected by members of the Millwall Supporters Club (MSC), Peter Garston was appointed to a two-year term.

On 3 May 2006, lifelong Millwall supporter Stewart Till became the new chairman of Millwall Football Club, with Peter de Savary remaining as chair of the Holding Company, (Millwall holdings plc).AIM: MWH New Executive Deputy Chair Heather Rabbatts oversaw the running of the company. On 23 May 2006, Nigel Spackman was announced as the new manager of Millwall Football Club. Spackman failed to make an impact at the South London club after a run of only 2 competitive wins out of 8 games (up to and including 9 September 2006.) In September 2006, Theo Paphitis (chairman from 1997 to 2005) ended his 9-year association with the club after a year spell as a non-executive director of The Lions.

On 25 September 2006 Spackman left the club by mutual consent after five successive defeats, placing assistant Willie Donachie in temporary charge, and leaving Millwall second from bottom in League One.

On 27 October 2006, Peter de Savary stepped down as Chairman of Millwall Holdings plc, promoting Heather Rabbatts to the position.

On 22 November 2006, Willie Donachie was appointed manager on a permanent basis.

On 19 March 2007, Donachie received a two-year contract as reward for excellent progress which had seen the club climb to 11th place in the league.

Before Donachie took charge, Millwall had taken only six points from their first ten games. Club Chairman Stewart Till told the Millwall website: "This achievement speaks for itself."

However, the start of the 2007–08 season saw Millwall bottom of the table at the beginning of October. Willie Donachie and assistant Pat Holland were both sacked on 8 October, with Richard Shaw and Colin West becoming caretaker managers.

The Millwall board appointed Kenny Jackett Manager of Millwall Football Club on 6 November 2007. Despite losing their last game of the season 2–1 away to Swindon on 3 May 2008, Millwall had already secured their League One status with a 3–0 home win against Carlisle the previous week. Millwall finished in 17th place with 52 points.

== Regeneration, Sports City and American investment ==
In 2006, Millwall's Board unveiled an ambitious scheme to regenerate the area surrounding The New Den backed by new investors. Sports City is to become a major redevelopment of housing and a hotel with the football ground a central point.

In March 2007 Chestnut Hill Ventures, led by John Berylson, who have interests in business and financial services, retail, property and sport invested £5m into the club. In addition to this investment, a further £1.5m was raised from investment from other parties and existing directors of the company and former chairman Peter de Savary invested another £500,000.

Graham F. Lacey, became the club's biggest shareholder, buying 15% of shares in Millwall Holdings plc, invested £1million as part of the package.

Berylson became non-executive chairman of Millwall Holdings plc and a director of the club, while his colleague Demos Kouvaris joined both boards.

"This is tremendous news for Millwall and our fans," said Heather Rabbatts, who will continue to run the club in the role of executive deputy chairman.

In the wake of calls by Graham Ferguson Lacey to the Millwall board to hold an extraordinary general meeting, requests which the Millwall board twice refused, claiming Lacey's proposals are "vexatious and ineffective", a date was set for 2 July 2008. Chief executive Heather Rabbatts said: "Mr Lacey has left us with little choice so we have decided to call a general meeting as this will result in lesser costs than going to court. "Nevertheless, this is still a highly-damaging exercise we are being forced into and will cost the club many thousands of pounds when we can least afford it."

A week before the EGM, Chestnut Hill Ventures, the company of Lions chairman John Berylson, converted a £2.3m loan into shares in Millwall PLC – thereby becoming the club's major shareholder. Fellow directors Constantine Gonticas, Trevor Keyse and Stewart Till also converted a combined sum of £200,000 into shares. Berylson and the rest of the board hold a combined stake of 36.66% in the club, while Lacey's share has dropped to around 22.2%.

On 2 July 2008, Chairman John Berylson won the support of 46,000 shareholder supporters at the crucial shareholders meeting, who voted against motions that would have tied his hands on major decisions concerning regeneration around The Den. Lacey who had foisted the meeting on the Millwall Board, did not turn up

== Pushing towards the Championship ==
During July 2008 there was some controversy over the signings that Kenny Jackett made, as there were few promising young strikers other than Ashley Grimes. Some of these concerns were dispelled after Neil Harris found the net frequently throughout the pre-season. The signings of Tony Craig, David Forde, Jimmy Abdou and Grimes have given Millwall fans hope of winning promotion this season and Tony Craig showed his loyalty to the club by stating: "I'm home" on the Millwall web site. Harris and Chris Hackett both agreed terms on new contracts in June. It took Harris a lot longer to decide as it meant him accepting a drop in wages of almost half of what he earned the previous season. Jackett also signed Trésor Kandol on a six-month loan deal from Leeds United on 6 August. Further into the season due to injuries to players like Gary Alexander Jackett signed out of favour striker Jermaine Easter from Plymouth Argyle F.C. on an initial one-month loan deal, and former Burnley F.C. striker Gifton Noel-Williams on a short-term contract after being released from his contract by Spanish side Elche CF.

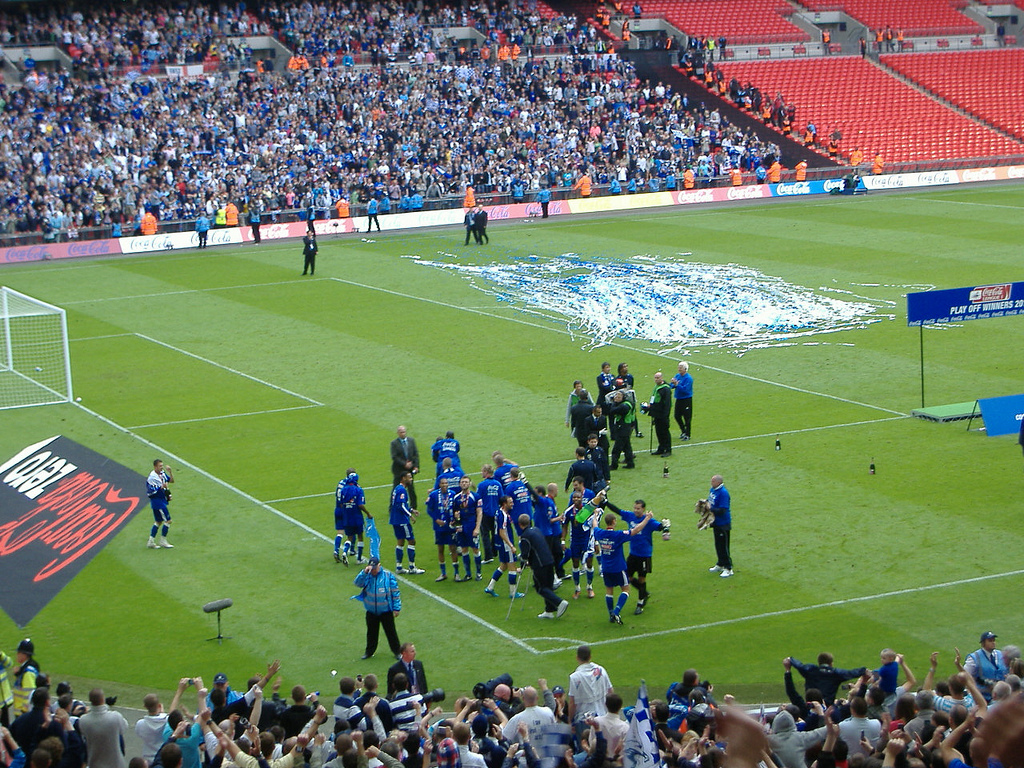
Millwall players celebrating promotion to the Football League Championship at Wembley Stadium in 2010.

Jackett led Millwall to two top six finishes in League One, in fifth and third place respectively. He won the League One Manager of the Month award three times while in charge of the club. On 13 January 2009, Harris broke Teddy Sheringham's all-time goal scoring record for Millwall during the 3–2 away win against Crewe Alexandra with his 112th goal for the club. After a play-off final defeat in the 2008–09 season against Scunthorpe United and losing out on automatic promotion on the last day of the 2009–10 season to Leeds United by one point, Millwall made it back to Wembley, finally breaking the play-off hoodoo run of five successive failures in 1991, 1994, 2000, 2002 and 2009, with a 1–0 win in the 2010 League One play-off final against Swindon Town, securing a return to the Football League Championship after a four-year absence.

Millwall's first game back in the Championship was a 3–0 away win at Bristol City. The game had been much hyped due to City's signing of then-England goalkeeper David James. Only days after the defeat, Steve Coppell resigned as City manager. The Lions celebrated the 125th anniversary of the club on 2 October 2010, which was the closest home game date to the first fixture Millwall ever played against Fillebrook on 3 October 1885. Millwall drew 1–1 with Burnley and wore a special one-off kit for the game, made by manufacturers Macron, which bore the names of every footballer who had played for the club. Prior to the start of the 2011-12 season, Neil Harris left the club for the second time, departing as Millwall's all-time top goalscorer with 138 goals

Kenny Jackett celebrated five years in charge of the club in November 2012, with a 4–1 victory away at Nottingham Forest. After a strong start to the 2012–13 season, including a 13-game unbeaten run and flirting with the play-offs, Millwall finished poorly, with only five wins in the last 23 games, narrowly avoiding relegation on the last day of the season. Their poor league form coincided with reaching the semi-final of the FA Cup for the fifth time in their history. They played Wigan Athletic at Wembley Stadium on 14 April 2013, losing 2–0 to the eventual cup winners. Kenny Jackett resigned on 7 May 2013. He was Millwall's fourth-longest serving manager having managed 306 games. After a month of searching, Millwall appointed St Johnstone boss Steve Lomas as their new manager on 6 June 2013. His appointment provoked mixed emotions among some supporters, due to him being a former captain of West Ham United, their biggest rival. Club record goalscorer Neil Harris returned to Millwall for a third time as a coach on 23 June 2013 after retiring as a player through injury. Millwall sacked Lomas on 26 December 2013, after winning only five of his first 22 games in charge. Harris and youth team coach Scott Fitzgerald took over as joint caretaker-managers.

== Harris' return, play-offs, and FA Cup giant-killers: 2014–2019 ==
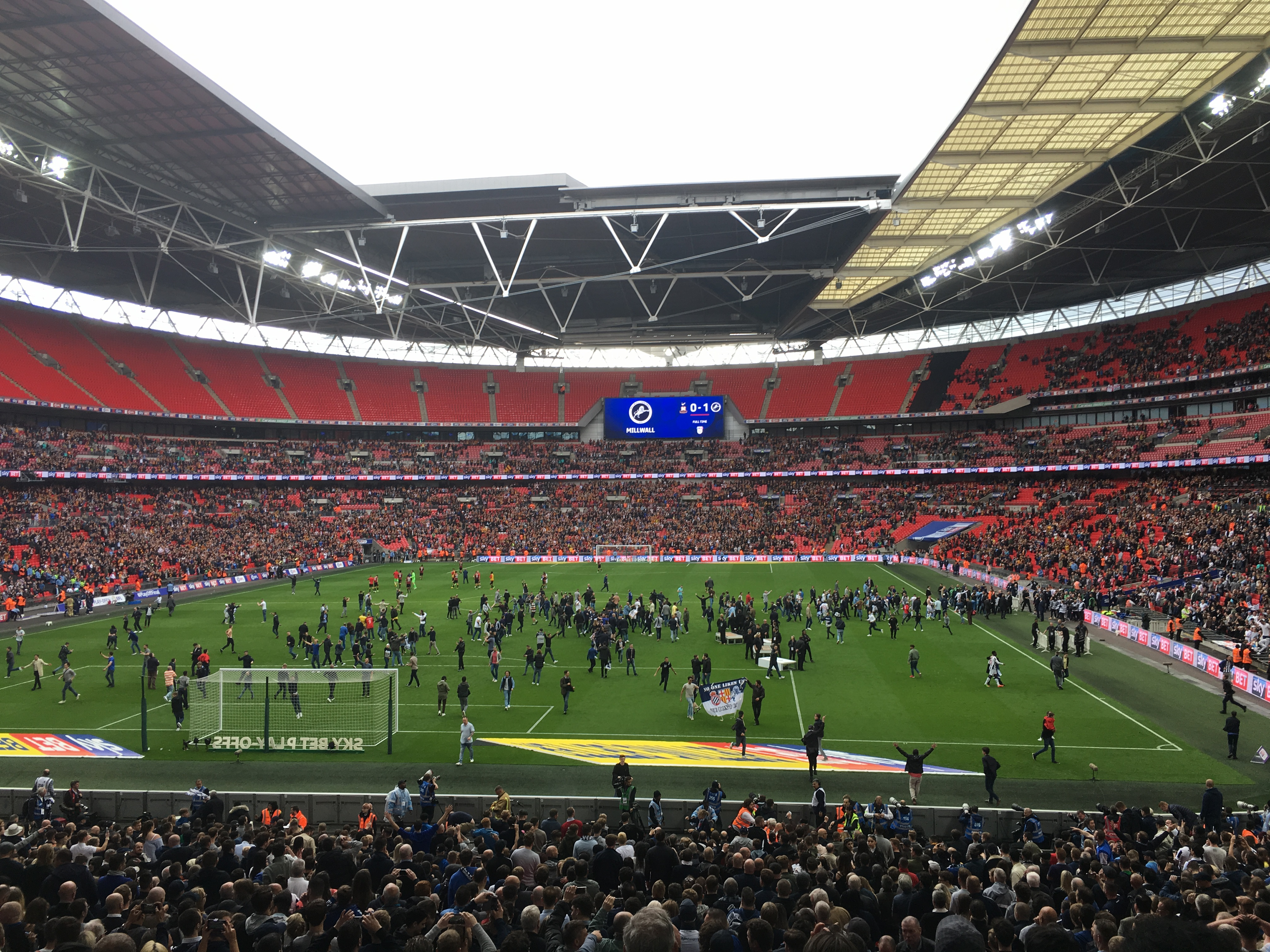
The first pitch invasion at the new Wembley Stadium by Millwall fans, May 2017

The club appointed Ian Holloway as their new manager on 6 January 2014, with the club sitting 21st in the Championship table. He was given the priority of maintaining their Football League Championship status, which he achieved. Millwall went unbeaten in the last eight games of the 2013–14 season and finished in 19th place, four points above the relegation zone. The following season, Holloway was sacked on 10 March 2015 with the team second from bottom in the Championship, and Neil Harris was reinstated as caretaker manager until the end of the season. He was unable to ensure survival, however, as Millwall's relegation to League One was confirmed on 28 April with one game of the 2014–15 season still to play. Harris was confirmed as Millwall's permanent manager the next day. In his first full season in charge, Harris led Millwall to a fourth-place finish in League One and a play-off final at Wembley, which the Lions lost 3–1 to Barnsley.

In the 2016–17 FA Cup, Millwall reached the Quarter-finals for the tenth time in their history, knocking out Premier League opposition in three consecutive rounds: Bournemouth in the third round, Watford in the fourth round, and reigning Premier League champions Leicester City in the fifth round. On 28 February 2017, Millwall beat Peterborough United 1–0, increasing their unbeaten run to 16 games in all competitions, and going nine games without conceding a goal for the first time since the 1925–26 season. Millwall made it to the League One play-off final at Wembley for the second successive year, after beating Scunthorpe United 3–2 in the semi-final. They were promoted back to the Championship following a 1–0 playoff final victory over Bradford City, thanks to an 85th-minute winner from Steve Morison, his 86th goal for the club.

In Millwall's return to the Championship in the 2017–18 season the team went on a club record 17-game unbeaten run; their longest streak in the second tier, which surpassed a record of 15 set in 1971. During the undefeated run they won six away games in a row, equalling a club record set in the 2008–09 season. In the 2018–19 FA Cup, Millwall reached the Quarter-finals for an 11th time in their history, losing to Premier League side Brighton on penalties. In the previous round they knocked out Premier League side Everton, to equal Southampton's FA Cup 'Giant-killings' record, having knocked out 25 top-flight teams when not in the top flight themselves. This season Millwall broke their club transfer fee record twice, firstly buying Tom Bradshaw from Barnsley for £1.25 million, and then a week later buying midfielder Ryan Leonard from Sheffield United for £1.5 million. They also broke their record received for a player, selling George Saville to Middlesbrough for £8 million.

On 3 October 2019, Neil Harris resigned as Millwall manager with the club sitting in 18th place with two wins from their first ten Championship games. Harris led Millwall to Wembley twice, with one promotion, and to two FA Cup quarter-finals during his tenure. He was the Lions fifth longest-serving manager, having spent four and a half years at the club, managing 248 games.

== Rowett era, death of chairman and instability: 2019–2024 ==
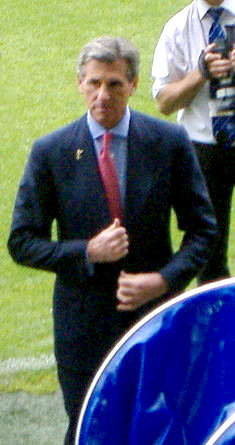
Millwall's late American chairman John Berylson, who owned the club from 2007 to 2023.

On 21 October 2019, Harris was replaced by former Stoke City boss Gary Rowett. Rowett inspired a dramatic upturn in form; losing only two matches of his first 15 league games, which saw the 2019–20 season end in an 8th-placed finish, just two points off the play-offs. Rowett guided the club to a mid-table 11th place in his second season in charge. This season marked the first time in Millwall's history that they played more seasons in the second tier (44) than the third tier (43). The following 2021–22 season saw an improved 9th-place finish, missing out on the play-offs on the final day of the season. Millwall went close again in 2022–23. Millwall required a win on the final day of the season to secure a play-off spot but gave up a 3–1 lead, losing 4–3 to Blackburn Rovers and eventually finishing 8th.

On 4 July 2023, the club announced the death of owner and chairman John Berylson, who died in a car accident. The 70-year-old was driving in Falmouth, Massachusetts, lost control of his Range Rover and hit a tree. He died at the scene. A club statement remarked "Under John's passionate leadership and guidance, Millwall Football Club has enjoyed tremendous success and stability. Since first becoming involved in the club in 2006, he has presided over some of the greatest moments in Millwall's history, and his influence in providing the platform for those was immeasurable...any success moving forward will be in his memory and honour. It will be his legacy." His son, James, was named as his replacement as chairman. On 18 October 2023, the club announced it had mutually agreed to part company with first team manager Gary Rowett with assistant manager Adam Barrett taking over as interim manager. On 6 November 2023, Millwall confirmed England under-20s manager Joe Edwards as their new head coach. In his debut game, Edwards led Millwall to a 4–0 win at Sheffield Wednesday, the Lions' largest away win in the second tier for 22 years. After a 2–0 home defeat by Sheffield Wednesday, and just four wins in 19 games, Edwards was sacked by Millwall on 21 February 2024. He was replaced by former player and record club goalscorer Neil Harris, his third spell in charge of the Lions.
