= 2016–17 EFL League One =

EFL League One
- Season: 2016–17
- Champions: Sheffield United (1st divisional title)
- Promoted: Sheffield United; Bolton Wanderers; Millwall
- Relegated: Chesterfield; Coventry City; Swindon Town; Port Vale
- Matches: 552
- Goals: 1,417 (2.57 per match)
- Top goalscorer: Billy Sharp (30 goals)
- Best goalkeeper: Mark Howard (Bolton) 9
- Biggest home win: Bristol Rovers 5–0 Northampton Town; Scunthorpe United 5–0 Gillingham
- Biggest away win: Bristol Rovers 1–5 Charlton Athletic
- Longest winning run: Sheffield United (7 matches)
- Longest unbeaten run: Fleetwood Town (18 matches)
- Longest winless run: Bury (20 matches)
- Longest losing run: Bury (13 matches)
- Highest attendance: 31,003 (Sheffield United 3-2 Chesterfield, 30 April 2017)
- Lowest attendance: 1,907 (Rochdale 4–0 Walsall)
- Average attendance: 7,576

The 2016–17 EFL League One (referred to as the Sky Bet League One for sponsorship reasons) was the 13th season of the Football League One under its current title and the 24th season under its current league division format. The fixtures were announced on 22 June 2016.

== Team changes ==
Bolton and Oxford competed in the third tier for the first time under the League One name. AFC Wimbledon made their debut in the third tier.

=== To League One ===
Promoted from League Two

- Northampton Town
- Oxford United
- Bristol Rovers
- AFC Wimbledon

Relegated from Championship

- Charlton Athletic
- Milton Keynes Dons
- Bolton Wanderers

=== From League One ===
Promoted to Championship

- Wigan Athletic
- Burton Albion
- Barnsley

Relegated to League Two

- Doncaster Rovers
- Blackpool
- Colchester United
- Crewe Alexandra

== Teams ==
Locations of the 2016–17 Football League One teams in England
Greater London League One football clubs
Greater Manchester League One football clubs

| Team | Location | Stadium | Capacity |
|---|---|---|---|
| AFC Wimbledon | London (Kingston upon Thames) | Kingsmeadow | 4,850 (2,265 seated) |
| Bolton Wanderers | Bolton | Macron Stadium | 28,723 |
| Bradford City | Bradford | Valley Parade | 25,136 |
| Bristol Rovers | Bristol | Memorial Stadium | 12,011 |
| Bury | Bury | Gigg Lane | 11,640 |
| Charlton Athletic | London (Charlton) | The Valley | 27,111 |
| Chesterfield | Chesterfield | Proact Stadium | 10,400 |
| Coventry City | Coventry | Ricoh Arena | 32,500 |
| Fleetwood Town | Fleetwood | Highbury Stadium | 5,311 (2,701 seated) |
| Gillingham | Gillingham | Priestfield Stadium | 11,582 |
| Millwall | London (South Bermondsey) | The Den | 20,146 |
| Milton Keynes Dons | Milton Keynes | Stadium:mk | 30,500 |
| Northampton Town | Northampton | Sixfields Stadium | 7,798 |
| Oldham Athletic | Oldham | Boundary Park | 13,512 |
| Oxford United | Oxford | Kassam Stadium | 12,500 |
| Peterborough United | Peterborough | ABAX Stadium | 15,314 |
| Port Vale | Stoke-on-Trent | Vale Park | 18,947 |
| Rochdale | Rochdale | Spotland Stadium | 10,249 |
| Scunthorpe United | Scunthorpe | Glanford Park | 9,088 |
| Sheffield United | Sheffield | Bramall Lane | 32,702 |
| Shrewsbury Town | Shrewsbury | New Meadow | 9,875 |
| Southend United | Southend-on-Sea | Roots Hall | 12,392 |
| Swindon Town | Swindon | County Ground | 15,728 |
| Walsall | Walsall | Bescot Stadium | 11,300 |

== Managerial changes ==
| Team | Outgoing manager | Manner of departure | Date of vacancy | Position in table | Incoming manager | Date of appointment |
|---|---|---|---|---|---|---|
| Bolton Wanderers | (Northern Ireland) Neil Lennon | Sacked | 15 March 2016 | Pre-season | (England) Phil Parkinson | 10 June 2016 |
| Charlton Athletic | (Belgium) Jose Riga | Resigned | 7 May 2016 | Pre-season | (England) Russell Slade | 6 June 2016 |
| Sheffield United | (England) Nigel Adkins | Sacked | 12 May 2016 | Pre-season | (England) Chris Wilder | 12 May 2016 |
| Northampton Town | (England) Chris Wilder | Signed by Sheffield United | 12 May 2016 | Pre-season | (Wales) Rob Page | 19 May 2016 |
| Port Vale | (Wales) Rob Page | Signed by Northampton Town | 19 May 2016 | Pre-season | (Portugal) Bruno Ribeiro | 20 June 2016 |
| Oldham Athletic | (Republic of Ireland) John Sheridan | Signed by Notts County | 27 May 2016 | Pre-season | (Northern Ireland) Steve Robinson | 9 July 2016 |
| Bradford City | (England) Phil Parkinson | Signed by Bolton Wanderers | 10 June 2016 | Pre-season | (Scotland) Stuart McCall | 20 June 2016 |
| Fleetwood Town | (Scotland) Steven Pressley | Resigned | 26 July 2016 | Pre-season | (Germany) Uwe Rösler | 30 July 2016 |
| Coventry City | (England) Tony Mowbray | Resigned | 29 September 2016 | 24th | (England) Russell Slade | 21 December 2016 |
| Shrewsbury Town | (Scotland) Micky Mellon | Signed by Tranmere Rovers | 6 October 2016 | 21st | (England) Paul Hurst | 24 October 2016 |
| Milton Keynes Dons | (England) Karl Robinson | Sacked | 23 October 2016 | 19th | (Scotland) Robbie Neilson | 3 December 2016 |
| Charlton Athletic | (England) Russell Slade | Sacked | 14 November 2016 | 15th | (England) Karl Robinson | 24 November 2016 |
| Bury | (England) David Flitcroft | Mutual consent | 16 November 2016 | 16th | (England) Chris Brass | 14 December 2016 |
| Port Vale | (Portugal) Bruno Ribeiro | Resigned | 26 December 2016 | 17th | (England) Michael Brown | 26 December 2016 |
| Gillingham | (England) Justin Edinburgh | Sacked | 3 January 2017 | 17th | (England) Adrian Pennock | 4 January 2017 |
| Chesterfield | (Northern Ireland) Danny Wilson | Sacked | 8 January 2017 | 22nd | (Scotland) Gary Caldwell | 17 January 2017 |
| Northampton Town | (Wales) Rob Page | Sacked | 9 January 2017 | 16th | (England) Justin Edinburgh | 13 January 2017 |
| Oldham Athletic | (Northern Ireland) Steve Robinson | Sacked | 12 January 2017 | 24th | (Republic of Ireland) John Sheridan | 12 January 2017 |
| Bury | (England) Chris Brass | Sacked | 15 February 2017 | 20th | (England) Lee Clark | 15 February 2017 |
| Coventry City | (England) Russell Slade | Sacked | 5 March 2017 | 24th | (England) Mark Robins | 6 March 2017 |

== League table ==
| Pos | Team | Pld | W | D | L | GF | GA | GD | Pts | Promotion, qualification or relegation |
|---|---|---|---|---|---|---|---|---|---|---|
| 1 | Sheffield United (C, P) | 46 | 30 | 10 | 6 | 92 | 47 | +45 | 100 | Promotion to the EFL Championship |
| 2 | Bolton Wanderers (P) | 46 | 25 | 11 | 10 | 68 | 36 | +32 | 86 | Promotion to the EFL Championship |
| 3 | Scunthorpe United | 46 | 24 | 10 | 12 | 80 | 54 | +26 | 82 | Qualification for the League One play-offs (Note: Four teams play for one spot and promotion to the EFL Championship.) |
| 4 | Fleetwood Town | 46 | 23 | 13 | 10 | 64 | 43 | +21 | 82 | Qualification for the League One play-offs |
| 5 | Bradford City | 46 | 20 | 19 | 7 | 62 | 43 | +19 | 79 | Qualification for the League One play-offs |
| 6 | Millwall (O, P) | 46 | 20 | 13 | 13 | 66 | 57 | +9 | 73 | Qualification for the League One play-offs |
| 7 | Southend United | 46 | 20 | 12 | 14 | 70 | 53 | +17 | 72 | |
| 8 | Oxford United | 46 | 20 | 9 | 17 | 65 | 52 | +13 | 69 | |
| 9 | Rochdale | 46 | 19 | 12 | 15 | 71 | 62 | +9 | 69 | |
| 10 | Bristol Rovers | 46 | 18 | 12 | 16 | 68 | 70 | −2 | 66 | |
| 11 | Peterborough United | 46 | 17 | 11 | 18 | 62 | 62 | 0 | 62 | |
| 12 | Milton Keynes Dons | 46 | 16 | 13 | 17 | 60 | 58 | +2 | 61 | |
| 13 | Charlton Athletic | 46 | 14 | 18 | 14 | 60 | 53 | +7 | 60 | |
| 14 | Walsall | 46 | 14 | 16 | 16 | 51 | 58 | −7 | 58 | |
| 15 | AFC Wimbledon | 46 | 13 | 18 | 15 | 52 | 55 | −3 | 57 | |
| 16 | Northampton Town | 46 | 14 | 11 | 21 | 60 | 73 | −13 | 53 | |
| 17 | Oldham Athletic | 46 | 12 | 17 | 17 | 31 | 44 | −13 | 53 | |
| 18 | Shrewsbury Town | 46 | 13 | 12 | 21 | 46 | 63 | −17 | 51 | |
| 19 | Bury | 46 | 13 | 11 | 22 | 61 | 73 | −12 | 50 | |
| 20 | Gillingham | 46 | 12 | 14 | 20 | 59 | 79 | −20 | 50 | |
| 21 | Port Vale (R) | 46 | 12 | 13 | 21 | 45 | 70 | −25 | 49 | Relegation to EFL League Two |
| 22 | Swindon Town (R) | 46 | 11 | 11 | 24 | 44 | 66 | −22 | 44 | Relegation to EFL League Two |
| 23 | Coventry City (R) | 46 | 9 | 12 | 25 | 37 | 68 | −31 | 39 | Relegation to EFL League Two |
| 24 | Chesterfield (R) | 46 | 9 | 10 | 27 | 43 | 78 | −35 | 37 | Relegation to EFL League Two |

Source: BBC Sport
Rules for classification: 1) Points; 2) Goal difference; 3) Number of goals scored
(C) Champions; (O) Play-off winners; (P) Promoted; (R) Relegated

== Play-offs ==
Semi-finals
3 | Scunthorpe United | 0 | 2 | 2
6 | Millwall | 0 | 3 | 3
4 | Fleetwood Town | 0 | 0 | 0
5 | Bradford City | 1 | 0 | 1

Final
6 | Millwall | 1
5 | Bradford City | 0

== Results ==
| Home \ Away | WIM | BOL | BRA | BRR | BRY | CHA | CHF | COV | FLE | GIL | MIL | MKD | NOR | OLD | OXF | PET | PTV | ROC | SCU | SHU | SHR | STD | SWI | WAL |
|---|---|---|---|---|---|---|---|---|---|---|---|---|---|---|---|---|---|---|---|---|---|---|---|---|
| AFC Wimbledon | | 1–2 | 2–3 | 0–1 | 5–1 | 1–1 | 2–1 | 1–1 | 2–2 | 2–0 | 2–2 | 2–0 | 0–1 | 0–0 | 2–1 | 0–0 | 4–0 | 3–1 | 1–2 | 2–3 | 1–1 | 0–2 | 0–0 | 1–0 |
| Bolton Wanderers | 1–1 | | 0–0 | 1–1 | 0–0 | 1–2 | 0–0 | 1–0 | 2–1 | 4–0 | 2–0 | 1–1 | 2–1 | 2–0 | 0–2 | 3–0 | 3–1 | 1–0 | 2–1 | 1–0 | 2–1 | 1–1 | 1–2 | 4–1 |
| Bradford City | 3–0 | 2–2 | | 1–1 | 1–1 | 0–0 | 2–0 | 3–1 | 2–1 | 2–2 | 1–1 | 2–2 | 1–0 | 1–1 | 1–0 | 1–0 | 0–0 | 4–0 | 0–0 | 3–3 | 2–0 | 1–1 | 2–1 | 1–0 |
| Bristol Rovers | 2–0 | 1–2 | 1–1 | | 4–2 | 1–5 | 2–1 | 4–1 | 2–1 | 2–1 | 3–4 | 0–0 | 5–0 | 1–0 | 2–1 | 1–2 | 2–1 | 2–2 | 1–1 | 0–0 | 2–0 | 2–0 | 1–0 | 1–1 |
| Bury | 1–2 | 0–2 | 0–2 | 3–0 | | 2–0 | 2–1 | 2–1 | 0–0 | 1–2 | 2–3 | 0–0 | 3–0 | 0–1 | 2–3 | 5–1 | 4–1 | 0–1 | 1–2 | 1–3 | 2–1 | 1–4 | 1–0 | 3–3 |
| Charlton Athletic | 1–2 | 1–1 | 1–1 | 4–1 | 0–1 | | 1–0 | 3–0 | 1–1 | 3–0 | 0–0 | 0–2 | 1–1 | 1–1 | 0–1 | 0–2 | 2–0 | 0–1 | 2–1 | 1–1 | 3–0 | 2–1 | 3–0 | 1–1 |
| Chesterfield | 0–0 | 1–0 | 0–1 | 3–2 | 1–2 | 1–2 | | 1–0 | 0–1 | 3–3 | 1–3 | 0–0 | 3–1 | 0–1 | 0–4 | 3–3 | 1–0 | 1–3 | 0–3 | 1–4 | 1–1 | 0–4 | 3–1 | 2–0 |
| Coventry City | 2–2 | 2–2 | 0–2 | 1–0 | 0–0 | 1–1 | 2–0 | | 0–1 | 2–1 | 0–2 | 1–2 | 1–1 | 0–0 | 2–1 | 1–0 | 2–1 | 2–0 | 0–1 | 1–2 | 0–0 | 0–2 | 1–3 | 1–0 |
| Fleetwood Town | 0–0 | 2–4 | 2–1 | 3–1 | 0–0 | 2–2 | 2–1 | 2–0 | | 2–1 | 1–0 | 1–4 | 3–0 | 1–0 | 2–0 | 2–0 | 0–0 | 0–0 | 2–2 | 1–1 | 3–0 | 1–1 | 0–1 | 2–1 |
| Gillingham | 2–2 | 0–4 | 1–1 | 3–1 | 2–1 | 1–1 | 1–1 | 2–1 | 2–3 | | 1–1 | 1–0 | 2–1 | 1–2 | 0–1 | 0–1 | 1–1 | 3–0 | 3–2 | 1–2 | 1–1 | 2–1 | 1–1 | 1–1 |
| Millwall | 0–0 | 0–2 | 1–1 | 4–0 | 0–0 | 3–1 | 0–0 | 1–1 | 2–1 | 2–1 | | 2–1 | 3–0 | 3–0 | 0–3 | 1–0 | 2–0 | 2–3 | 3–1 | 2–1 | 0–1 | 1–0 | 2–0 | 0–0 |
| Milton Keynes Dons | 1–0 | 1–1 | 1–2 | 3–3 | 1–3 | 0–1 | 2–3 | 1–0 | 0–1 | 3–2 | 2–2 | | 5–3 | 1–0 | 0–0 | 0–2 | 0–1 | 2–2 | 0–1 | 0–3 | 2–1 | 0–3 | 3–2 | 1–1 |
| Northampton Town | 0–0 | 0–1 | 1–2 | 2–3 | 3–2 | 2–1 | 3–1 | 3–0 | 1–1 | 0–0 | 1–3 | 3–2 | | 1–2 | 0–0 | 0–1 | 2–1 | 2–3 | 1–2 | 1–2 | 1–1 | 4–0 | 2–1 | 2–0 |
| Oldham Athletic | 0–0 | 1–0 | 1–2 | 0–2 | 0–0 | 1–0 | 0–0 | 3–2 | 2–0 | 1–0 | 0–0 | 0–2 | 0–0 | | 2–1 | 2–0 | 0–0 | 1–1 | 2–0 | 1–1 | 2–3 | 0–2 | 0–2 | 0–0 |
| Oxford United | 1–3 | 2–4 | 1–0 | 0–2 | 5–1 | 1–1 | 1–1 | 4–1 | 1–3 | 1–0 | 1–2 | 1–0 | 0–1 | 1–1 | | 2–1 | 2–0 | 1–0 | 2–1 | 2–3 | 2–0 | 0–2 | 2–0 | 0–0 |
| Peterborough United | 0–1 | 1–0 | 0–1 | 4–2 | 3–1 | 2–0 | 5–2 | 1–1 | 1–2 | 1–1 | 5–1 | 0–4 | 3–0 | 1–1 | 1–2 | | 2–2 | 3–1 | 0–2 | 0–1 | 2–1 | 1–4 | 2–2 | 1–1 |
| Port Vale | 2–0 | 0–2 | 1–2 | 1–1 | 2–2 | 1–1 | 1–0 | 0–2 | 2–1 | 2–1 | 3–1 | 0–0 | 2–3 | 2–2 | 2–2 | 0–3 | | 1–0 | 3–1 | 0–3 | 2–1 | 2–0 | 3–2 | 0–1 |
| Rochdale | 1–1 | 1–0 | 1–1 | 0–0 | 2–0 | 3–3 | 3–0 | 2–0 | 2–1 | 4–1 | 3–3 | 0–1 | 1–1 | 1–0 | 0–4 | 2–3 | 3–0 | | 3–2 | 3–3 | 2–1 | 3–0 | 4–0 | 4–0 |
| Scunthorpe United | 1–2 | 1–0 | 3–2 | 3–1 | 3–2 | 0–0 | 3–1 | 3–1 | 0–2 | 5–0 | 3–0 | 2–1 | 1–1 | 1–0 | 1–1 | 1–1 | 3–2 | 2–1 | | 2–2 | 0–1 | 4–0 | 4–1 | 0–0 |
| Sheffield United | 4–0 | 2–0 | 3–0 | 1–0 | 1–0 | 2–1 | 3–2 | 2–0 | 0–2 | 2–2 | 2–0 | 2–1 | 1–0 | 2–0 | 2–1 | 1–0 | 4–0 | 1–1 | 1–1 | | 2–1 | 0–3 | 4–0 | 0–1 |
| Shrewsbury Town | 2–1 | 0–2 | 1–0 | 2–0 | 2–1 | 4–3 | 2–1 | 0–0 | 0–1 | 2–3 | 1–2 | 0–1 | 2–4 | 1–0 | 2–0 | 1–1 | 0–0 | 1–0 | 0–1 | 0–3 | | 1–0 | 1–1 | 1–1 |
| Southend United | 3–0 | 0–1 | 3–0 | 1–1 | 1–0 | 1–1 | 1–0 | 3–1 | 0–2 | 1–3 | 3–1 | 1–2 | 2–2 | 3–0 | 2–1 | 1–1 | 1–1 | 2–1 | 3–1 | 2–4 | 1–1 | | 1–1 | 3–2 |
| Swindon Town | 0–0 | 0–1 | 1–0 | 1–2 | 1–2 | 3–0 | 0–1 | 1–0 | 1–1 | 3–1 | 1–0 | 1–1 | 1–3 | 0–0 | 1–2 | 0–1 | 1–0 | 3–0 | 1–2 | 2–4 | 1–1 | 0–0 | | 0–2 |
| Walsall | 3–1 | 1–0 | 1–1 | 3–1 | 3–3 | 1–2 | 1–0 | 1–1 | 0–1 | 1–2 | 2–1 | 1–4 | 2–1 | 2–0 | 1–1 | 2–0 | 0–1 | 0–2 | 1–4 | 4–1 | 3–2 | 0–0 | 1–0 | |

Updated to match(es) played on 30 April 2017. Source: BBC Sport
Legend: Blue = home team win; Yellow = draw; Red = away team win.

== Top scorers ==
As of 22 April 2017

| Rank | Player | Club | Goals |
|---|---|---|---|
| 1 | (England) Billy Sharp | Sheffield United | 30 |
| 2 | (England) James Vaughan | Bury | 24 |
| 3 | (England) Josh Morris | Scunthorpe United | 19 |
| 4 | (Republic of Ireland) Simon Cox | Southend United | 16 |
| 4 | (England) Matty Taylor | Bristol Rovers | 16 |
| 6 | (England) Lee Gregory | Millwall | 15 |
| 6 | (England) Ian Henderson | Rochdale | 15 |
| 8 | (England) David Ball | Fleetwood Town | 14 |
| 8 | (England) Erhun Oztumer | Walsall | 14 |
| 10 | (England) Alex Jones | Bradford City/Port Vale | 13 |
| 10 | (Scotland) Chris Maguire | Oxford United | 13 |
| 10 | (Republic of Ireland) Aiden O'Brien | Millwall | 13 |
| 10 | (England) Josh Wright | Gillingham | 13 |

== Monthly awards ==
| Month | Manager of the Month | | Player of the Month | | Reference |
| Month | Manager | Club | Player | Club | Reference |
|---|---|---|---|---|---|
| August | (England) Phil Parkinson | Bolton Wanderers | (England) Josh Morris | Scunthorpe United | |
| September | (England) David Flitcroft | Bury | (England) Josh Morris | Scunthorpe United | |
| October | (England) Phil Parkinson | Bolton Wanderers | (England) Zach Clough | Bolton Wanderers | |
| November | (Scotland) Graham Alexander | Scunthorpe United | (Republic of Ireland) Jay O'Shea | Chesterfield | |
| December | (England) Keith Hill | Rochdale | (Northern Ireland) Matty Lund | Rochdale | |
| January | (Germany) Uwe Rösler | Fleetwood Town | (England) James Vaughan | Bury | |
| February | (England) Neil Harris | Millwall | (England) Billy Sharp | Sheffield United | |
| March | (England) Phil Parkinson | Bolton Wanderers | (Portugal) Filipe Morais | Bolton Wanderers | |
| April | (England) Chris Wilder | Sheffield United | (England) Leon Clarke | Sheffield United | |

== Attendances ==
| # | Football club | Home games | Average attendance |
|---|---|---|---|
| 1 | Sheffield United | 23 | 21,892 |
| 2 | Bradford City | 23 | 18,167 |
| 3 | Bolton Wanderers | 23 | 14,934 |
| 4 | Charlton Athletic | 23 | 11,162 |
| 5 | MK Dons | 23 | 10,307 |
| 6 | Millwall FC | 23 | 9,340 |
| 7 | Bristol Rovers | 23 | 9,302 |
| 8 | Coventry City | 23 | 9,118 |
| 9 | Oxford United | 23 | 8,297 |
| 10 | Southend United | 23 | 7,406 |
| 11 | Swindon Town | 23 | 7,026 |
| 12 | Northampton Town | 23 | 6,208 |
| 13 | Gillingham FC | 23 | 6,129 |
| 14 | Chesterfield FC | 23 | 5,929 |
| 15 | Peterborough United | 23 | 5,581 |
| 16 | Shrewsbury Town | 23 | 5,507 |
| 17 | Walsall FC | 23 | 5,072 |
| 18 | Port Vale | 23 | 4,813 |
| 19 | Scunthorpe United | 23 | 4,536 |
| 20 | Oldham Athletic | 23 | 4,514 |
| 21 | AFC Wimbledon | 23 | 4,477 |
| 22 | Bury FC | 23 | 3,845 |
| 23 | Rochdale AFC | 23 | 3,556 |
| 24 | Fleetwood Town | 23 | 3,272 |
