= Dorney (surname) =

Dorney is a surname. Notable people with the surname include:

- Alan Dorney (born 1947), British footballer
- Esmond Dorney (1906–1991), Australian architect
- Jack Dorney (born 1990), British footballer
- John Dorney, British writer and actor
- Keith Dorney (born 1957), American football player
- Kiernan Dorney (1912–2007), Australian surgeon
- Mick Dorney (1884–1952), Irish hurler
- Sean Dorney (born 1951), Australian journalist
- William Dorney (1891–?), Irish hurler

== See also ==
- Dorny
