= 2026–27 English Football League =

128th season of the English Football League

English Football League
- Season: 2026–27
- New clubs in league: York City; Rochdale

The 2026–27 English Football League will be the 128th season of the English Football League (EFL) and the ninth season under that name after it was renamed from The Football League in 2016. For the 14th season, the league is sponsored by Sky Betting & Gaming and is therefore known as the Sky Bet EFL.

The EFL is contested through three divisions: the Championship, League One and League Two. The winner and the runner-up of the Championship are automatically promoted to the Premier League and they are joined by the winner of the Championship play-off. The bottom two teams in League Two are relegated to the National League.

== Promotion and relegation ==
=== From the Premier League ===
Relegated to the Championship

- West Ham United
- Burnley
- Wolverhampton Wanderers

=== From the Championship ===
Promoted to the Premier League

- Coventry City
- Ipswich Town
- Hull City

Relegated to League One

- Oxford United
- Leicester City
- Sheffield Wednesday

=== From League One ===
Promoted to the Championship

- Lincoln City
- Cardiff City
- Bolton Wanderers

Relegated to League Two

- Exeter City
- Port Vale
- Rotherham United
- Northampton Town

=== From League Two ===
Promoted to League One

- Bromley
- Milton Keynes Dons
- Cambridge United
- Notts County

Relegated to the National League

- Harrogate Town
- Barrow

=== From the National League ===
Promoted to League Two

- York City
- Rochdale

== Map of teams ==
Locations of the 2026–27 English Football League teams:
Red: Region
Blue: Championship
Yellow: League One
Green: League Two

Locations of the 2026–27 English Football League teams in Greater London
Locations of the 2026–27 English Football League teams in the West Midlands
Locations of the 2026–27 English Football League teams in South Yorkshire
Locations of 2026–27 EFL Northwest teams (Lancashire and Greater Manchester)

== Championship ==
=== Table ===
Pos	Team	Pld	W	D	L	GF	GA	GD	Pts	Promotion, qualification or relegation
1	Birmingham City	15	8	5	2	28	14	+14	29	Promotion to the Premier League
2	Middlesbrough	15	8	5	2	30	19	+11	29	Promotion to the Premier League
3	Stoke City	15	9	2	4	24	18	+6	29	Qualification for Championship play-off semi-finals
4	Wolverhampton Wanderers	15	8	4	3	26	18	+8	28	Qualification for Championship play-off semi-finals
5	West Bromwich Albion	15	8	4	3	23	15	+8	28	Qualification for Championship play-off quarter-finals
6	Swansea City	15	8	2	5	22	18	+4	26	Qualification for Championship play-off quarter-finals
7	Southampton	15	8	4	3	29	15	+14	24 (Note: Southampton were deducted four points due to multiple breaches of EFL regulations related to the unauthorised filming of other clubs' training.)	Qualification for Championship play-off quarter-finals
8	Queens Park Rangers	15	6	6	3	24	18	+6	24	Qualification for Championship play-off quarter-finals
9	West Ham United	15	6	5	4	37	23	+14	23	
10	Sheffield United	15	6	4	5	21	19	+2	22	
11	Portsmouth	15	6	4	5	20	18	+2	22	
12	Norwich City	15	7	0	8	32	24	+8	21	
13	Blackburn Rovers	15	6	3	6	22	23	−1	21	
14	Cardiff City	15	4	6	5	27	27	0	18	
15	Wrexham	15	4	6	5	18	20	−2	18	
16	Millwall	15	5	3	7	23	27	−4	18	
17	Bristol City	15	5	3	7	16	24	−8	18	
18	Bolton Wanderers	15	5	2	8	20	29	−9	17	
19	Charlton Athletic	15	4	5	6	13	23	−10	17	
20	Watford	15	4	3	8	13	23	−10	15	
21	Lincoln City	15	4	3	8	15	26	−11	15	
22	Burnley	15	1	7	7	22	31	−9	10	Relegation to EFL League One
23	Derby County	15	2	4	9	14	30	−16	10	Relegation to EFL League One
24	Preston North End	15	2	2	11	13	30	−17	8	Relegation to EFL League One

Updated to match(es) played on 7 November 2026. Source: EFL Official Website
Rules for classification: 1) Points; 2) Goal difference; 3) Number of goals scored; 4) Head-to-head results; 5) Wins; 6) Away goals; 7) Penalty points (sec 9.5); 8) Number of 12-point sending off offences; 9) Play-off (only if needed to determine promotion/relegation)

== Results ==
Home \ Away	BIR	BLB	BOL	BRI	BUR	CAR	CHA	DER	LIN	MID	MIL	NOR	POR	PNE	QPR	SHU	SOU	STO	SWA	WAT	WBA	WHU	WOL	WRX
Birmingham City	—			2–2						2–2	3–0			4–0	3–0		1–1		2–1				2–2	
Blackburn Rovers		—			a	2–1				2–1	3–1				1–2	1–2		1–2				2–1		2–0
Bolton Wanderers			—	2–3		1–0			0–1	1–5				2–1				1–2				2–3		
Bristol City		0–1		—		a			0–1		0–2	0–5	2–1			0–1				1–0			1–2	
Burnley		a		1–2	—		2–2	1–1		1–1			0–0									2–2	1–2	
Cardiff City	1–0			a	5–4	—	3–1									2–2		1–1	a	5–1		3–3		1–1
Charlton Athletic			0–1	1–1			—	2–1			a	1–3	0–0	1–0	0–0	2–1						a		
Derby County	1–2		3–1			2–2		—				0–4						0–1	0–3		0–1			1–1
Lincoln City	1–3	0–0			4–1				—				1–3				1–1		1–2			0–6		
Middlesbrough						2–2	3–0		2–1	—	2–2	4–3									3–1		1–0	
Millwall			4–0				a	4–1	2–2		—	3–0			a				0–1			2–2		0–3
Norwich City	2–1		3–4		4–1							—	0–1				0–1			3–2	1–2			
Portsmouth		2–2				2–0		0–2			2–1		—		1–3	3–2	a	1–2	3–1					
Preston North End		2–1		1–3					0–1		0–1			—		2–3	1–0				1–1		1–3	
Queens Park Rangers			0–0		1–1	2–1	a	4–1	2–1	0–1	a			2–2	—				5–0			a		
Sheffield United	0–0		3–2					1–1	3–0			1–3				—							0–1	1–0
Southampton			0–0	4–1							5–1		1–0		4–1		—	3–1	3–1					
Stoke City				0–0			4–0			2–3		1–0		2–0		2–1		—	1–2					
Swansea City		4–0			3–1	a						2–1				0–0			—	2–0		0–1		0–0
Watford					0–4		2–0		1–0	0–0				2–1			2–1	1–2		—		1–1		
West Bromwich Albion	0–1	3–2			3–1		1–1				3–0				1–1		1–1			1–0	—		a	
West Ham United							1–2	3–0			a				1–1		2–3				1–3	—	4–2	6–0
Wolverhampton Wanderers		2–2	1–3			3–0							1–1					4–1		1–0	1–0		—	
Wrexham	1–2				1–1					2–0				4–1			2–1			1–1	1–2		1–1	—

Updated to match(es) played on 7 November 2026. Source: efl.com
Legend: Blue = home team win; Yellow = draw; Red = away team win.
For upcoming matches, an "a" indicates there is an article about the rivalry between the two participants.

=== Bracket ===
Eliminators
5	TBC
8	TBC
6	TBC
7	TBC

Semi-finals
3
Lowest-seeded eliminators winner
4
Highest-seeded eliminators winner

Final

== League One ==
=== Table ===
Pos	Team	Pld	W	D	L	GF	GA	GD	Pts	Promotion, qualification or relegation
1	Huddersfield Town	14	8	5	1	28	12	+16	29	Promotion to EFL Championship
2	Stockport County	14	8	2	4	26	14	+12	26	Promotion to EFL Championship
3	Oxford United	13	7	5	1	22	11	+11	26	Qualification for League One play-offs
4	Luton Town	14	7	3	4	27	21	+6	24	Qualification for League One play-offs
5	Plymouth Argyle	14	7	2	5	21	19	+2	23	Qualification for League One play-offs
6	Reading	14	6	4	4	25	15	+10	22	Qualification for League One play-offs
7	Bradford City	13	6	4	3	10	8	+2	22	
8	Cambridge United	14	5	6	3	21	21	0	21	
9	Sheffield Wednesday	13	5	5	3	22	14	+8	20	
10	Leicester City	13	5	4	4	22	19	+3	19	
11	Mansfield Town	13	5	4	4	20	18	+2	19	
12	Milton Keynes Dons	13	4	6	3	22	20	+2	18	
13	Wycombe Wanderers	13	4	6	3	21	23	−2	18	
14	Leyton Orient	13	5	2	6	19	14	+5	17	
15	Burton Albion	14	4	5	5	18	21	−3	17	
16	Stevenage	12	4	4	4	17	13	+4	16	
17	Notts County	12	3	5	4	13	14	−1	14	
18	AFC Wimbledon	13	3	4	6	9	21	−12	13	
19	Blackpool	12	3	3	6	17	21	−4	12	
20	Doncaster Rovers	13	3	3	7	14	22	−8	12	
21	Wigan Athletic	14	3	2	9	11	22	−11	11	Relegation to EFL League Two
22	Peterborough United	13	2	4	7	11	23	−12	10	Relegation to EFL League Two
23	Barnsley	12	2	3	7	12	22	−10	9	Relegation to EFL League Two
24	Bromley	13	2	3	8	13	33	−20	9	Relegation to EFL League Two

Updated to match(es) played on 4 November 2026. Source: EFL Official Website
Rules for classification: 1) Points; 2) Goal difference; 3) Number of goals scored; 4) Head-to-head results; 5) Wins; 6) Away goals; 7) Penalty points (sec 9.5); 8) 12-point sending off offences

== Results ==
Home \ Away	WIM	BAR	BLP	BRA	BRM	BUR	CAM	DON	HUD	LEI	LEY	LUT	MAN	MKD	NCO	OXF	PET	PLY	REA	SHW	STE	STO	WIG	WYC
AFC Wimbledon	—							1–0					0–3	0–0					0–0				1–0	1–1
Barnsley		—	2–1		0–1		1–2			1–1						1–1					1–5			
Blackpool			—		2–2								1–4	2–0			4–0	2–4						1–1
Bradford City				—			1–2		0–3		0–0		1–0				2–0				2–0			
Bromley	0–2				—		1–1		2–1	0–4	0–5						1–1							
Burton Albion	4–1			0–0		—	2–2		1–3		2–1		2–2								1–1			
Cambridge United	1–1		1–0				—		1–2									2–3	2–1				3–2	2–2
Doncaster Rovers		0–0				1–0		—							1–1			2–3		2–0		0–2		
Huddersfield Town	3–0								—			1–1			1–1	3–1	4–1			2–2			2–1	
Leicester City						1–2		2–1		—						0–4	1–3	2–0			2–2		3–0	
Leyton Orient		1–3	2–0				3–0				—							0–2		1–2	1–0			2–3
Luton Town		2–1		0–1				3–1		2–1	1–1	—			2–2							2–0		
Mansfield Town					2–1			2–1	0–0			5–2	—		0–2	1–1								
Milton Keynes Dons	a				4–1			6–1	1–1	0–0		2–1		—			1–1		1–5					
Notts County				0–1		2–1				1–1					—	1–2				2–0		1–1		
Oxford United				0–0		3–0	1–1							2–2		—			2–0			1–0	2–1	
Peterborough United						2–2		0–2				0–2	2–1				—			1–2	0–0			
Plymouth Argyle	2–1	3–0		2–0		0–1			0–2									—	0–0			1–3		
Reading		2–1	3–1	1–1							1–0	3–4	5–0		2–0				—					
Sheffield Wednesday	5–0		1–1	0–1	7–2		1–1													—		0–0	0–0	
Stevenage								2–2				2–1		0–1		1–2		3–0			—		1–0	
Stockport County	2–1	3–1	1–2		1–0					3–4							1–0					—		5–1
Wigan Athletic					3–2						0–2		0–0	3–1					1–0			0–4	—	0–1
Wycombe Wanderers						2–0						1–4		3–3	2–0			1–1	2–2	1–2				—

Updated to match(es) played on 4 November 2026. Source: BBC Sport
Legend: Blue = home team win; Yellow = draw; Red = away team win.
For upcoming matches, an "a" indicates there is an article about the rivalry between the two participants.

== League Two ==
=== Table ===
Pos	Team	Pld	W	D	L	GF	GA	GD	Pts	Promotion, qualification or relegation
1	Salford City	14	10	1	3	25	15	+10	31	Promotion to EFL League One
2	Barnet	13	7	5	1	28	18	+10	26	Promotion to EFL League One
3	Walsall	13	5	7	1	21	12	+9	22	Promotion to EFL League One
4	Crewe Alexandra	14	5	7	2	17	17	0	22	Qualification for League Two play-offs
5	Cheltenham Town	14	6	3	5	23	25	−2	21	Qualification for League Two play-offs
6	Grimsby Town	14	5	5	4	24	18	+6	20	Qualification for League Two play-offs
7	York City	14	5	5	4	24	21	+3	20	Qualification for League Two play-offs
8	Gillingham	14	5	5	4	20	19	+1	20	
9	Accrington Stanley	14	4	7	3	23	17	+6	19	
10	Chesterfield	14	5	4	5	24	21	+3	19	
11	Tranmere Rovers	14	4	7	3	19	17	+2	19	
12	Exeter City	14	5	4	5	11	9	+2	19	
13	Swindon Town	14	5	4	5	15	17	−2	19	
14	Newport County	14	4	6	4	20	17	+3	18	
15	Shrewsbury Town	14	5	3	6	17	22	−5	18	
16	Fleetwood Town	14	4	5	5	18	18	0	17	
17	Bristol Rovers	14	5	1	8	17	23	−6	16	
18	Oldham Athletic	14	4	3	7	15	19	−4	15	
19	Port Vale	12	4	3	5	10	14	−4	15	
20	Rochdale	14	4	3	7	17	26	−9	15	
21	Northampton Town	13	3	5	5	9	10	−1	14	
22	Rotherham United	14	2	6	6	18	25	−7	12	
23	Colchester United	13	2	6	5	12	19	−7	12	Relegation to National League
24	Crawley Town	12	2	3	7	13	21	−8	9	Relegation to National League

Updated to match(es) played on 3 November 2026. Source: EFL Official Website
Rules for classification: 1) Points; 2) Goal difference; 3) Number of goals scored; 4) Head-to-head results; 5) Wins; 6) Away goals; 7) Penalty points (sec 9.5); 8) 12-point sending off offences

== Results ==
Home \ Away	ACC	BRN	BRI	CHT	CHF	COL	CRA	CRE	EXE	FLE	GIL	GRI	NEW	NOR	OLD	POV	ROC	ROT	SAL	SHR	SWI	TRA	WAL	YOR
Accrington Stanley	—			2–0		2–2	3–2				3–1	2–2	0–0	1–1										
Barnet	2–1	—		2–2						3–1					1–1				3–1		1–3			3–1
Bristol Rovers		1–3	—			2–0			1–0				5–3					1–0	1–2		0–0			
Cheltenham Town				—	2–1					4–2		2–2	1–0					2–1	0–2					3–2
Chesterfield		3–3			—	1–1		5–1		0–1	1–1											4–2		2–0
Colchester United				1–1		—		1–1	0–0						2–1		1–0						1–3	
Crawley Town			0–2	1–3	2–2		—	0–1												2–3		1–1		
Crewe Alexandra		1–1	3–1					—						1–0			3–2			1–1			2–2	1–1
Exeter City	2–0	1–1						2–0	—	2–1								1–0				0–0	0–0	
Fleetwood Town			3–1							—	0–0				1–1		1–2	2–0		2–0			1–1	
Gillingham			3–0								—	1–4	0–0	1–1		1–1						2–0	0–3	
Grimsby Town			2–0				2–0		1–0	2–2		—		0–2						1–2				5–2
Newport County					4–1	1–0				1–1		2–1	—				3–0					2–2		1–1
Northampton Town						2–0	1–1						1–0	—	0–1			0–1			0–0	0–1		
Oldham Athletic	0–0			4–1	1–2		0–1								—	2–0			1–4		3–0			
Port Vale					1–0			0–0	1–0			1–0				—	4–2					1–1		
Rochdale	0–5						1–2				1–4	2–2			2–0		—			3–0	1–0			
Rotherham United					2–1			1–1			1–4		2–2					—	3–3	3–3				1–1
Salford City					0–1		2–1		2–1	1–0			2–1			1–0			—		1–0			
Shrewsbury Town		1–3	1–0			2–2			0–1		1–2			2–0					1–0	—				
Swindon Town	1–1		a	2–1		3–1		0–1								3–1		2–1			—		1–1	
Tranmere Rovers		1–2		3–1											2–0		1–1	2–2		2–0		—	1–1	
Walsall	3–2											0–0			3–0	2–0	0–0		2–4				—	
York City	1–1		3–2						2–1		3–0			1–1		2–0					4–0			—

Updated to match(es) played on 3 November 2026. Source: BBC Sport
Legend: Blue = home team win; Yellow = draw; Red = away team win.
For upcoming matches, an "a" indicates there is an article about the rivalry between the two participants.
