= David Jones (footballer, born 1940) =

English footballer

Personal information
- Full name: David Willmott Llewellyn Jones
- Date of birth: 9 April 1940
- Place of birth: Kingsley, Cheshire, England
- Date of death: 12 December 2013 (aged 73)
- Place of death: South Africa
- Position: Inside forward

Youth career
- 1955–1956: Crewe Alexandra

Senior career*
Years	Team	Apps	(Gls)
1956–1957	Crewe Alexandra	10	(1)
1957–1959	Birmingham City	9	(0)
1959–1964	Millwall	165	(71)
1964–1970	Rangers Johannesburg		
1970	Durban City		
- * Club domestic league appearances and goals

David Willmott Llewellyn Jones (9 April 1940 – 12 December 2013) was an English professional footballer who scored 72 goals in 184 appearances in the Football League playing for Crewe Alexandra, Birmingham City and Millwall, where he spent the majority of his career. He is Millwall's seventh all-time leading scorer, with 74 goals.

== Playing career ==
Jones was born in Kingsley, Cheshire. He began his football career as a youngster with Crewe Alexandra, and was capped by England at youth level. An inside forward, Jones became Crewe's youngest goalscorer, aged 16 years 144 days, in a match against Gateshead on 10 September 1956, a record which as of March 2009 he still holds. At the end of the 1956–57 season, Jones turned professional with First Division club Birmingham City. He was integrated gradually into the first team, deputising occasionally for experienced forwards Peter Murphy and Bryan Orritt, and had played nine games in the top flight when his progress was disrupted by a leg injury. In December 1959, Jones moved to Millwall of the Fourth Division.

His first full season brought Jones 23 goals; in the next, 1961–62, he was Millwall's joint top scorer alongside Peter Burridge with 22 goals apiece as the club won the Fourth Division title. They promptly sold Burridge, and despite Jones's contributions, two years later they were relegated back to the Fourth Division. Following their relegation, the size of the squad was halved; Jones was among those cut. After 71 goals in 165 league games, he moved to South Africa where he played for Rangers Johannesburg.

Jones died in South Africa on 12 December 2013.

== Honours ==
- Football League Fourth Division champions: 1961–62 with Millwall.
