= Dorny =

Dorny is the name of:

== Surname ==
- Julia Dorny (born 1990), German athlete, media scientist and journalist
- Thérèse Dorny (1891–1976), French film and stage actress

== Given name ==
- Dorny Romero (born 1995), Dominican footballer

== See also ==
- Dorney (surname)
