= Archibald McKenzie (footballer) =

Scottish footballer

Personal information
- Full name: Archibald Denny McKenzie
- Date of birth: 1 May 1863
- Place of birth: Greenock, Scotland
- Date of death: 1946 (aged 82–83)
- Place of death: Greenock, Scotland
- Position: Inside forward

Senior career*
Years	Team	Apps	(Gls)
1892–1894	Clyde	27	(7)
1894–1895	Millwall Athletic		
1895–1896	Sunderland	2	(1)
1896–1897	Millwall Athletic		
1897–1899	West Bromwich Albion	51	(9)
1899–1900	Portsmouth		
1900–190?	Dumbarton		
- * Club domestic league appearances and goals

Archibald Denny McKenzie (1 May 1863 – 1946) was a Scottish professional footballer who played as an inside forward for clubs including Clyde, Sunderland and West Bromwich Albion.
