= Ron Gray (footballer) =

English footballer, manager, and scout

Ron Gray (25 June 1920 – 11 October 2002) was a former association football player, manager and scout. Born in North Shields, wing half Gray started his professional year in 1938 with Sheffield United, later moving to Lincoln City, Notts County and finally Watford, before retiring at the age of 26 due to injury. He started his managerial career at Watford, but his tenure was not particularly successful. The club recorded their lowest ever football league finish, having to apply for re-election to the Football League in 1950–51. His next managerial role was at Millwall. After his first spell as manager, Gray stayed at the club as assistant manager to Reg Smith. Gray was re-appointed as manager after Smith was sacked, and led the club to promotion as Fourth Division champions in 1961–62. Gray later spent four seasons at Lincoln City from 1966 to 1970, when he signed future Watford manager Graham Taylor as a player. After leaving Lincoln, Gray joined Ipswich Town as a scout, where he remained until his retirement in 1987. and discovered many of the 1978 FA Cup and 1981 UEFA Cup winning team's under the management of Bobby Robson.
