= Alf Wood (footballer, born 1945) =

English footballer (1945–2020)

Personal information
- Full name: Alfred Edward Howson Wood
- Date of birth: 25 October 1945
- Place of birth: Macclesfield, England
- Date of death: 10 April 2020 (aged 74)
- Position: Striker

Youth career
- ?–1963: Manchester City

Senior career*
Years	Team	Apps	(Gls)
1963–1966	Manchester City	25	(0)
1966–1972	Shrewsbury Town	258	(65)
1972–1974	Millwall	100	(38)
1974–1976	Hull City	53	(10)
1976–1977	Middlesbrough	23	(2)
1977–1978	Walsall	29	(2)
1978–?	Stafford Rangers	?	(?)
Total		488	(117)
- * Club domestic league appearances and goals

Alfred Edward Howson Wood (25 October 1945 – 10 April 2020) was an English footballer who played for Manchester City, Shrewsbury Town, Millwall, Hull City, Middlesbrough, Walsall and Stafford Rangers.

He died in April 2020 at the age of 74. He had been living with dementia for 12 years.
