= Bristol Rovers F.C.–Swindon Town F.C. rivalry =

Football rivalry in England

Bristol Rovers and Swindon Town rivalry
- Other names: West Country Derby, M4 Derby
- Location: South West England
- Teams: Bristol Rovers; Swindon Town
- First meeting: 24 October 1891
- Latest meeting: Swindon Town 1–1 Bristol Rovers (28 February 2025)
- Next meeting: Bristol Rovers v Swindon Town (24 October 2026)

Statistics
- Total meetings: 147
- Most wins: Swindon Town (63)
- All-time record: Bristol Rovers: 61; Draw: 22; Swindon Town: 64
- Largest victory: Bristol Rovers 5–0 Swindon Town (25 March 1939); Swindon Town 5–0 Bristol Rovers (26 December 1913)
- Current win streak: None
- The locations of the teams shown in southern England

The fixture between Bristol Rovers and Swindon Town is a local football rivalry, sometimes referred to as a West Country derby or M4 Derby. The distance between Bristol to Swindon is under 35 miles, and both clubs are situated in the South West region of England.

== History ==
The first meeting between the clubs was in a friendly match held in Swindon on 24 October 1891. Swindon beat Rovers (known at the time as Eastville Rovers) 5–2, and just under two months later they met for a second time, drawing 2–2.

Having been in the same division in only two seasons out of 13 between 1993 and 2006, the clubs would then be in the same division for the next six consecutive seasons, even being promoted (League Two in 2007) and relegated (League One in 2011) at the same time.

== Head-to-head record ==
=== All-time record ===
As of match played 28 February 2026

Competition	Played	Bristol Rovers wins	Draws	Swindon Town wins
Western League	4	1	0	3
Southern League	34	18	3	13
Football League	96	35	19	43
League total	135	54	22	59
FA Cup	5	3	0	2
Division 3 (South) Cup	1	1	0	0
Football League Trophy	6	3	0	3
Totals	147	61	22	64

== Derby double ==
When one team beats another in both their league meetings in a single season, this is known as a league double. It is considered to be a sign of superiority of the winning team over the losing team and seen as an impressive achievement, particularly if the losing team is generally thought of as being a strong side. Swindon Town have completed the league double over Bristol Rovers a total of thirteen times: once in the Western League, once in the Southern League and eleven times in the English Football League (EFL). Rovers meanwhile have recorded double victories over Swindon ten times: four times in the Southern League and six in the EFL.

Season	Division	Winner	Results	
Season	Division	Winner	Home	Away
1897–1898	Western League Professional Section	Swindon Town	3–0	1–0
1900–1901	Southern League Division One	Bristol Rovers	1–0	1–0
1901–1902	Southern League Division One	Bristol Rovers	1–0	1–0
1902–1903	Southern League Division One	Swindon Town	2–1	3–2
1903–1904	Southern League Division One	Bristol Rovers	2–0	2–0
1905–1906	Southern League Division One	Bristol Rovers	2–1	2–1
1924–1925	Football League Division Three (South)	Swindon Town	3–0	1–0
1925–1926	Football League Division Three (South)	Swindon Town	4–2	2–1
1926–1927	Football League Division Three (South)	Bristol Rovers	3–1	5–3
1928–1929	Football League Division Three (South)	Swindon Town	2–1	4–1
1931–1932	Football League Division Three (South)	Swindon Town	2–1	2–0
1937–1938	Football League Division Three (South)	Swindon Town	2–1	2–1
1950–1951	Football League Division Three (South)	Bristol Rovers	1–0	2–1
1965–1966	Football League Division Three	Swindon Town	4–3	1–0
1966–1967	Football League Division Three	Bristol Rovers	3–0	1–0
1967–1968	Football League Division Three	Swindon Town	4–1	2–1
1981–1982	Football League Division Three	Swindon Town	5–2	4–1
1990–1991	Football League Division Two	Bristol Rovers	2–1	2–0
1995–1996	Football League Division Two	Swindon Town	2–1	4–1
2007–2008	Football League One	Swindon Town	1–0	1–0
2009–2010	Football League One	Bristol Rovers	3–0	4–0
2016–2017	EFL League One	Bristol Rovers	1–0	2–1
2020–2021	EFL League One	Swindon Town	1–0	1–0

== Records ==
Comparative chart of Rovers and Swindon in the league.

- Highest aggregate score: 9
  - Bristol Rovers 7–2 Swindon Town, Southern League Division One, 11 November 1899
- Highest Bristol Rovers score: 7
  - Bristol Rovers 7–2 Swindon Town, Southern League Division One, 11 November 1899
- Highest Swindon Town score: 5
  - Swindon Town 5–0 Bristol Rovers, Southern League Division One, 26 December 1913
  - Swindon Town 5–2 Bristol Rovers, Football League Division Three, 6 March 1982
- Biggest margin of victory: 5
  - Bristol Rovers 7–2 Swindon Town, Southern League Division One, 11 November 1899
  - Swindon Town 5–0 Bristol Rovers, Southern League Division One, 26 December 1913

== Crossing the divide ==
=== Players ===
Numerous players have represented both Bristol Rovers and Swindon Town in their careers during the 138 years since both clubs have been in existence. A list of some of the most notable examples are given below. To be included in this list a player must have made at least 50 league appearances for both Bristol Rovers and Swindon Town.

Name	Nation	Bristol Rovers			Swindon Town		
Name	Nation	Years	Apps	Gls	Years	Apps	Gls
Gary Emmanuel	Wales	1978–1981	65	2	1981–1984	111	8
Andy Gurney	England	1992–1997	108	9	2001–2004; 2005–2006	160	23
Sammy Igoe	England	2006–2008	72	2	2003–2005	79	9
Tim Parkin	England	1981–1986	206	12	1986–1989	110	6
Mark Walters	England †	1999–2002	82	13	1996–1999	112	27
Steve White	England	1977–1979; 1983–1986	135	44	1986–1994	200	83
Andy Williams	England	2007–2010	87	8	2012–2015	89	31
Brian Williams	England	1981–1985	172	21	1978–1981	99	8

† Players with highlighted nationalities were capped at full international level by their countries.

=== Managers ===
Three men have managed both Bristol Rovers and Swindon Town. Fred Ford was in charge of Bristol Rovers between April 1968 and July 1969, winning 26 of the 70 games played during that spell. Later in 1969 he took charge of Swindon, where he won 35 out of 83 matches in a 20-month spell at the club.

Ben Garner has also managed both teams. He was appointed manager of Bristol Rovers in December 2019 and was relieved of his duties in November 2020 after managing for 36 games. Then in July 2021, he took his next appointment as the manager of Swindon Town where he was in charge for 56 games and achieved a creditable 50 per cent win ratio before leaving the position in June 2022 to take up the managerial position at Charlton Athletic. On 2 October 2021, Ben Garner lead Swindon in a League Two fixture against Bristol Rovers and achieved a 3-1 away win. He was also in charge for the 1-1 draw between the two sides at the County Ground on 22 January 2022.

Ian Holloway managed Bristol Rovers between 1996 and 2001 initially taking over as player-manager before retiring as a player in 1999 to concentrate fully on managing the team. He left the club in January 2001. Holloway became the manager of Swindon Town in October 2024 taking over from Mark Kennedy after a run of poor form, the team slipped to the bottom of League Two before finishing 12th at the end of the season. Holloway, as of October 2026, manages the team.

== See also ==
- Bristol Rovers F.C.
- Swindon Town F.C.

== Bibliography ==
- Byrne, Stephen; Jay, Mike (2003). Bristol Rovers Football Club: The Definitive History 1883–2003. Stroud: Tempus. ISBN 0-7524-2717-2.
