= Bryan King (footballer, born 1947) =

English footballer (born 1947)

Personal information
- Full name: Michael Bryan King
- Date of birth: 18 April 1947 (age 79)
- Place of birth: Bishop's Stortford, England
- Height: 6 ft 2 in (1.88 m)
- Position: Goalkeeper

Senior career*
Years	Team	Apps	(Gls)
1964–1967	Chelmsford City	136	(2)
1967–1975	Millwall	380	(0)
1975–1976	Coventry City	31	(0)
Total		547	(2)

Managerial career
- 1978–1980: Jerv
- 1980–1982: Harstad
- 1982–1985: Tynset
- 1985–1988: Kongsberg
- 1988–1991: Falkenberg
- * Club domestic league appearances and goals

Bryan King (born 18 April 1947) is an English former professional footballer who played as a goalkeeper for Chelmsford City, Millwall and Coventry City. After his playing career, he worked as a manager for Jerv, Harstad, Tynset and Kongsberg in Norway, and Falkenberg in Sweden. He later worked as a scout for Tottenham Hotspur, Aston Villa and Everton. He now lives in Kongsberg, Norway.

King worked as a scout for Tottenham Hotspur between 2002 and 2008 and was a scout for Aston Villa before that. On 6 January 2017, he left Everton as Scandinavian scout, after working there since 2008.

== Playing career ==
King was once called up to the England squad. He was a non-playing substitute for England in their match against Portugal on 3 April 1974.
