= John Shepherd (footballer, born 1932) =

English footballer (1932–2018)

Personal information
- Full name: John Herbert Edwin Shepherd
- Date of birth: 29 May 1932
- Place of birth: Kensington, England
- Date of death: 11 June 2018 (aged 86)
- Position: Inside forward

Senior career*
Years	Team	Apps	(Gls)
1952–1958	Millwall	149	(63)
1958–1960	Brighton & Hove Albion	45	(19)
1960–1961	Gillingham	53	(23)
1961	Tunbridge Wells		
1961–1962	Ashford Town	38	(18)
1962–1963	Margate		(4)
1963–1964	Tunbridge Wells		
1964–1971	Southwick		
- * Club domestic league appearances and goals

John Herbert Edwin Shepherd (29 May 1932 – 11 June 2018) was an English professional footballer who played as a inside forward. He played for Millwall, Brighton & Hove Albion and Gillingham between 1952 and 1961.

In January 2013, Shepherd's daughter - Julie Ryan - released a biography about her father entitled "In and out of the Lion's Den: poverty, war and football " (ISBN 978-1481081993).

In 1951 Shepherd contracted polio whilst undertaking his National Service in the RAF. It was feared he would not walk again, but he made a full recovery and signed professional forms for Millwall on 6 October 1952. He made his first team debut on 25 October 1952 away at Leyton Orient where he scored a record four goals. Shepherd became known as a 'hat trick specialist', and in his first season with Millwall he scored a hat-trick in a 4–1 win against Barrow in the 2nd round of the FA Cup to earn a 3rd round tie against Manchester United. He finished top scorer with 21 goals (15 League and 6 FA Cup) in his first season. He was also Millwall's top scorer with 25 League and Cup goals in the 1956/57 season, during which they had a memorable FA Cup run (in which Shepherd scored a hat trick against Margate in the second round) beating First Division Newcastle United in the fourth round. They subsequently lost to First Division Birmingham City in the fifth. He was selected to play in the Third Division South representative team in 1957. (As at January 2013) Shepherd remains Millwall's top FA Cup goal scorer with 15 goals in 17 games and is their sixth highest ever goal scorer.

At the end of the 1957/58 Shepherd was transferred to Brighton & Hove Albion where he was their top goal scorer in the club's first ever season in the old Football League Division Two, scoring 18 goals in 36 league appearances. He played almost two seasons there before transferring to Gillingham. Although Shepherd enjoyed playing at Gillingham under the managership of Harry Barratt he later said moving to Gillingham was the biggest mistake of his career and he wished he had stayed on to fight for his team place at Brighton.

Shepherd also played semi-professional football at Ashford Town (Kent) (where he was team captain), Margate and Tunbridge Wells, before going to become player/manager at Southwick who were struggling in Sussex County League Division Two at the time. He led them to promotion to Division One, and in 1968 led them to victory against Athenian League Horsham in the Sussex Senior Cup Final, played at the Goldstone Ground. The following season Southwick were Sussex County League Division One Champions.

Shepherd also managed the Sussex Senior Men's representative team and led them to victory in the Southern Counties Amateur Championship.

In the early 1970s Shepherd went back to the Goldstone Ground, firstly as youth scout, and later, after Alan Mullery was appointed Brighton manager, as youth team coach. In 1985, Shepherd, together with co-coach Mick Fogden, led the Brighton Youth Team to become the first club outside London to win the South East Counties Junior Cup.

In 2014, John Shepherd was presented with an award from the Sussex FA recognising his services to Sussex football. In 2018, Southwick FC named their stand after him.

Following John Shepherd's death in June 2018, Brighton honoured him, together with their former captain, Jimmy Collins, with a minute's applause at the start of their opening match of the 2018/19 season against Manchester Utd at the Amex. Brighton subsequently played John Shepherd Memorial charity matches.
