= Alan Dorney =

English footballer

Personal information
- Date of birth: 18 May 1947 (age 79)
- Place of birth: Bermondsey, London, England
- Height: 5 ft 11 1/4 in (1.81 m)
- Position: Central defender

Youth career
- Millwall

Senior career*
Years	Team	Apps	(Gls)
1968–1977	Millwall	252	(1)
–	Dartford		
- * Club domestic league appearances and goals

Alan Dorney (born 18 May 1947 in Bermondsey, London) is an English footballer who made more than 250 appearances in the Football League playing as a central defender for Millwall.
