= Peter Burridge =

English footballer (1933–2025)

Personal information
- Date of birth: 30 December 1933
- Place of birth: Harlow, Essex, England
- Date of death: 28 April 2025 (aged 91)
- Position: Forward

Senior career*
| Years | Team | Apps | (Gls) |
- Barnet
| ?–1960 | Leyton Orient | 6 | (2) |
| 1960–1962 | Millwall | 87 | (58) |
| 1962–1965 | Crystal Palace | 114 | (42) |
| 1965–? | Charlton Athletic | 44 | (4) |
| ?–19?? | Bedford Town | | |
- * Club domestic league appearances and goals

Peter Burridge (30 December 1933 – 30 April 2025) was an English footballer who played as an inside forward in the 1950s and 1960s.

== Background ==
Burridge was born in Harlow, Essex, England on 30 December 1933. He died on 30 April 2025, at the age of 91.

== Career ==
Burridge began his career with Barnet and from there was signed by Leyton Orient of the Football League in 1958–59. He only played a handful of games for the club before a successful transfer to Millwall in 1960. In the 1960–61 season he scored 34 goals for the club, and this was followed the next season with 22 goals which helped Millwall to the League title, following which he was sold to Crystal Palace for £10,000, signing in June 1962.

Burridge played over 100 league games for Palace, and scored a league hat-trick for them versus Wrexham on 15 April 1963. In season 1963–64 Palace were promoted to the second tier and Burridge played in all but two games, scoring 20 goals, making him joint (League) top-scorer with Cliff Holton. In November 1965, he moved to Charlton Athletic before returning to non-League football with Bedford Town.
