= Harry Cripps =

English footballer (1941–1995)

Personal information
- Full name: Henry Richard Cripps
- Date of birth: 29 April 1941
- Place of birth: Dereham, England
- Date of death: 29 December 1995 (aged 54)
- Place of death: Wanstead, England
- Position: Defender

Senior career*
Years	Team	Apps	(Gls)
1958–1961	West Ham United	0	(0)
1961–1974	Millwall	400	(37)
1974–1976	Charlton Athletic	20	(4)
Total		420	(41)

Managerial career
- 1980–1982: Barking
- 1990: Purfleet
- * Club domestic league appearances and goals

Henry Richard "Harry" Cripps (29 April 1941 – 29 December 1995) was an English professional footballer who played for South East London side Millwall for the majority of his career, becoming a cult figure in the process.

== Career ==
Initially on the books of Millwall's bitter rivals West Ham United, he was a member of the FA Youth Cup Final team of 1958–59 alongside Bobby Moore, Eddie Bovington and Jack Burkett.

Cripps was signed by The Lions in 1961 and made his first team debut on 19 August 1961 against Wrexham following an injury to Johnny Gilchrist. He rapidly became a fan favourite due to his bustling, combative performances at full back, always looking to get forward and score goals, and becoming renowned as a fearless tackler. He was particularly prominent during Millwall's successive promotion seasons in the mid-1960s, during which time the team began an unbeaten home record at The Den which extended to 59 matches (1964–1967), drawing on the intimidating atmosphere generated by Millwall's famously vociferous fans.

This period saw the club return to Division Two after a lengthy absence, under the guidance of Manager Billy Gray and later, Benny Fenton. He was also a key part of what was perhaps Millwall's greatest ever side that narrowly missed out on promotion to the old Division One by just one point, during the 1971–72 season, that also included the likes of Barry Kitchener, Keith Weller and Eamon Dunphy. He left the club after fourteen seasons to join Charlton in 1974, by which time he had amassed a record-breaking 400 league appearances for The Lions, beating the record of Jimmy Forsyth of 321 Football League appearances.

He later became a coach at Crystal Palace, as well as assistant manager at Charlton and manager of Barking between August 1980 and January 1982. In February 1990, Cripps was appointed manager of Purfleet. Cripps only managed a single game for Purfleet, a 4–0 Isthmian League defeat against Woking on 9 February 1990, having a stroke soon after. He was also a coach in the contrasting environment of Winchester College, an elite fee-paying College. Cripps worked as an insurance agent for Royal London until his death.

== Death ==
Cripps died of a heart attack on 29 December 1995.

== Tributes ==
Arry's Bar at The Den is named in his honour.
