= No one likes us, we don't care =

English sports chant

"No one likes us, we don't care" is a sports chant that originated as a football chant sung by supporters of the English football club Millwall in the late 1970s. It is sung to the tune of "(We Are) Sailing" by Rod Stewart.

"No One Likes Us"
No one likes us, we don't care. Sung by Millwall supporters in the Cold Blow Lane stand.

The late 1960s saw the rise of fan violence and football hooliganism throughout England; Millwall was one of several English teams that saw elements of hooliganism develop within its fanbase. The club's fans created the chant in response to sustained criticism of their behaviour from the press and media, who perpetuated an image of them as violent hooligans. It has since been adopted by supporters of several different sports teams around the world. The chant reached a worldwide audience when Millwall reached the 2004 FA Cup Final.

== History ==
=== Origins ===
From the late 1960s through to the early 1980s there was a gradual increase in academic study of, and political concerns over, violence at football matches. Millwall featured in some of these studies. In 1977 a Panorama programme by the BBC Dr. Anthony Clare used Millwall as an example of fans who were looking for trouble and, using a militaristic analogy, said:

But within Millwall's terraced army, there are divisions. ... In the trench warfare of the terraces, it's F-Troop who go over the top. F-Troop are the real nutters ... who go looking for fights and are seldom disappointed...

This was followed up by Don Atyeo who wrote in Blood & guts, violence in sports (1979) that "F-Troop are Millwall's hard men, an older (generally middle to late 20s), tougher brigade who are bent on 'rucking' at every opportunity, even to the extent of attending games which Millwall are not even playing". In his book The Soccer Tribe (1981), Desmond Morris mentions several football firms, but dwelt on hooliganism by Millwall supporters by quoting a long extract about F-Troop from Atyeo's book, and so introduced an even wider audience to Millwall's hooligans.

=== Challenges ===
Several other football clubs in the UK have a history of hooliganism and commentators such as Danny Baker and Rod Liddle, both Millwall supporters, have questioned why Millwall's history has consistently been singled out to the point where the name of Millwall has become almost synonymous with hooliganism. This in turn has created a siege mentality amongst ordinary, law-abiding Millwall fans.

Southwark-born writer and journalist Michael Collins believes that it is due to what he terms the demonisation of the white working classes, and that as Millwall's support has always been drawn from this group, they present an easy target for the press and media alike. Collins writes: "At the end of the 19th century around the time Millwall F.C. was formed, middle-class journalists used to descend on the area like Baudelaireian flaneurs, to report on the urban working class as though they were discovering natives from the remote islands of the Empire".

=== Other clubs ===
Supporters of other clubs, social groups and members of professions who perceive themselves as not being liked for various reasons, have used variations of the chant. Wealdstone F.C., Burnley F.C., MK Dons, Crawley Town, AIK, Shamrock Rovers, Philadelphia Eagles, Philadelphia Union, Columbus Crew SC, Seattle Sounders FC, Urawa Red Diamonds, Raith Rovers, Rangers, Hertha BSC, Detroit City FC, RB Leipzig, FK Rad, San Diego State Aztecs men's basketball, Manly-Warringah Sea Eagles, Grazer AK and MSV Duisburg supporters have also adopted the chant. Anaheim Ducks fans have adopted the line "No one likes us, we don't care" as an informal motto, usually replacing the "D" in "don't" for the team's logo, a stylized D. After an NHL playoff series against the Winnipeg Jets, some fans in Anaheim were shown on TV holding a banner with the motto. Rangers supporters sing a version of the song with the lyrics changed to reflect a bitter rivalry with Celtic. Non-league team Dulwich Hamlet F.C. also sing a version, with the lyrics changed to: "No one knows us, we don't care."

During the 2017–2018 Super Bowl LII victory parade for the Philadelphia Eagles on 8 February 2018, football center Jason Kelce sang a profane version of the chant referencing Philadelphia (which, as mentioned above, has been co-opted by Philadelphia Union supporters known as the Sons of Ben; that version uses the tune of "Oh, My Darling, Clementine", which has the same rhyming scheme as "Sailing", but a different melody) to the crowd's delight. Kelce's version of the chant would be replicated in singalong format by Philadelphia Flyers mascot Gritty during the Flyers' February 12, 2023 home game, in support of the Eagles' appearance later that same evening at Super Bowl LVII.

== Lyrics ==
No one likes us, no one likes us
No one likes us, we don't care!

We are Millwall, super Millwall
We are Millwall from The Den!
