= Phil Walker (footballer, born 1954) =

English footballer (1954–2022)

Personal information
- Full name: Philip Leonardus Walker
- Date of birth: 29 August 1954
- Place of birth: London, England
- Date of death: 8 July 2022 (aged 67)
- Position: Central midfielder

Senior career*
Years	Team	Apps	(Gls)
- Cobham
1974–1975	Epsom & Ewell	41	(19)
1975–1979	Millwall	146	(17)
1979–1983	Charlton Athletic	89	(15)
1983	→ Gillingham (loan)	2	(0)
1983	Eastern		
1984	Leixões		
1984–1991	Boavista	193	(7)
1991–1995	Maia		
- * Club domestic league appearances and goals

Philip Leonardus Walker (29 August 1954 – 8 July 2022) was an English professional footballer who played as a central midfielder. He played for Millwall, Charlton Athletic and Gillingham in the English Football League. After a brief spell with Eastern AA of Hong Kong, he finished his career with eleven years in Portugal with Leixões, Boavista and Maia. His nephew is the West Ham United player, Kyle Walker-Peters.

== Career ==
Born in London, Walker joined Millwall in 1975 having played for non-league sides Epsom & Ewell and Cobham prior to that, quickly establishing himself in the centre of the team's midfield. One of the first notable black players in the club's history, he garnered renown as a skilful player with excellent passing; he moved to Charlton Athletic in 1979, and remained there until 1983 when he briefly joined Hong Kong club Eastern AA.

Walker spent half a season with Portuguese club Leixões before moving on at the age of 30 to Boavista. He quickly established himself in the starting eleven, and was a first-choice player for the vast majority of his seven-year spell.

After nearly five seasons with northern neighbours Maia, then playing in the Portuguese Second Division, Walker retired at the age of 41. He subsequently had a brief stint as Maia's coach in the early 2000s.

== Later life ==
Following his retirement, Walker returned to England and set up a soccer school in Wandsworth, London. He died on 8 July 2022.
