= Jeff Burnige =

English businessman

Jeff Burnige (born 24 July 1947) was a director of Millwall Football Club from 1986 until 2008. In 2005, he was chairman in succession to Theo Paphitis and was succeeded by Peter de Savary He was instrumental in installing the club’s much-loved former chairman John G. Berylson who unexpectedly died in 2023. Jeff remains a shareholder and a fan.

With Reg Burr, he took over the club in 1986 and promotion to the old 1st Division (now the premiership) was achieved in 1988. The club was initially very successful in the top flight and was able to re-acquire the freehold of its stadium known as the Den.

In 1989 the club floated as Millwall Holdings PLC on the London Stock Exchange, only the second football club to do so. In 1993 the club opened the New Den, the first all-seater stadium built as a result of the Taylor Report into the Hillsborough Disaster. During his time Millwall played against Manchester United in the FA Cup Final and in the European Cup. Having led the club’s youth development for many years, in 1998 he founded and was the first Director of Millwall’s FA Academy.

He has served the game in many capacities, as a player, coach, manager and administrator. He remains Vice-president of the London Football Association and of Millwall Lionesses WFC, reflecting his work at grassroots level and in the women’s game, where he played an important part in the early development of girls' football. The Lionesses played a seminal role in the re-establishment of women's football, and while he was Chair, they won the FA Women's Cup twice. They were founders of the first Women's National League and played Doncaster Belles in the inaugural match in 1991.

He is the chairman of Millwall for All (formerly Millwall Anti-Racism Trust) and also the chairman of the Peckham and Kent Road Pension Society.

He graduated with an Honors Degree in German from King's College London and began his work life as a journalist on the Wembley observer before moving into property business as a developer with central and District Properties Ltd.

He was married to Jane Ireland until widowed in October 2007 and has two daughters Martha and Hester.
