= Millwall F.C. =

Association football club in London, England

Millwall
- Full name: Millwall Football Club
- Nickname: The Lions
- Founded: 1885; 141 years ago, as Millwall Rovers
- Ground: The Den
- Capacity: 20,146
- Chairman: James Berylson
- Head coach: Alex Neil
- League: EFL Championship
- 2025–26: EFL Championship, 3rd of 24
- Website: millwallfc.co.uk
Home colours	Away colours

Millwall Football Club (/ˈmɪlwɔːl/) is a professional football club in Bermondsey, South East London, England. They compete in the EFL Championship, the second level of English football. Founded as Millwall Rovers in 1885, the club has retained its name despite having last played in the Millwall area of the Isle of Dogs in 1910. From then until 1993, the club played at what is now called The Old Den in New Cross, before moving to its current home stadium nearby, called The Den. The traditional club crest is a rampant lion, referred to in the team's nickname The Lions. Millwall's traditional kit consists of dark blue shirts, white shorts, and blue socks.

Millwall was one of the founding members of the Southern League in 1894. They competed in it for 22 seasons until 1920, claiming the title twice in 1895 and 1896. Since joining the Football League in the 1920–21 season, the club have been promoted 11 times (five times as champions in 1928, 1938, 1962, 1988, and 2001) and relegated nine times. They have spent 93 of their 100 seasons in the Football League yo-yoing between the second and third tiers. The club had a brief spell in the top flight between 1988 and 1990, in which they achieved their highest ever league finish of tenth place in the Football League First Division in 1988–89. Millwall reached the 2004 FA Cup Final and qualified for UEFA competitions for the first time in their history, playing in the UEFA Cup. The club have reached the Football League play-offs nine times, winning the League One play-off finals in 2010 and 2017. Millwall also won the Football League Group Cup in 1983, and were Football League Trophy finalists in 1999.

Millwall's supporters have often been associated with hooliganism, with numerous films made fictionalising their notoriety. The fans are renowned for their terrace chant "No one likes us, we don't care". Millwall have a long-standing rivalry with fellow EFL Championship side West Ham United. The local derby between the two sides has been contested almost 100 times since 1899. Millwall also share a rivalry with Leeds United, and contest the South London derby which can also sometimes be referred to as the South East London derby for geographical reasons with local rivals in the district Crystal Palace and Charlton Athletic.

== History ==
=== Beginnings, Southern League and relocation: 1885–1920 ===
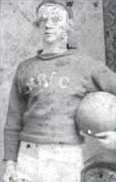
The first Millwall Rovers kit, worn by club secretary Jasper Sexton in 1885.

The club was founded as Millwall Rovers by the workers of J.T. Morton's canning and preserve factory in the Millwall area of the Isle of Dogs in London's East End in 1885. J.T. Morton was founded in Aberdeen in 1849 to supply sailing ships with food, the company opened their first English cannery and food processing plant at Millwall dock in 1872 and attracted a workforce from across the country, including the east coast of Scotland, primarily Dundee. The club secretary was 17-year-old Jasper Sexton, the son of the landlord of The Islander pub in Tooke Street where Millwall held their club meetings. Millwall Rovers' first game was an away fixture held on 3 October 1885 against Fillebrook, a team that played in Leytonstone. The newly formed team were beaten 5–0. Millwall's first home game was on a piece of waste ground on Glengall Road against St Luke's, on 24 October 1885, which they won 2–1.

Rovers found a better playing surface for the 1886–87 season, at the rear of the Lord Nelson pub and it became known as the Lord Nelson Ground. In November 1886, the East End Football Association was formed, along with the Senior Cup Competition. Millwall made it to the final against London Caledonians, which was played at Leyton Cricket Ground. The match finished 2–2 and the teams shared the cup for six months each. Millwall won the East London Senior Cup at the first attempt. The club also won the cup in the following two years, and the trophy became their property.

In April 1889, a resolution was passed for Millwall to drop "Rovers" from their name, and they began playing under the name Millwall Athletic, inspired by their move to their new home The Athletic Grounds. They were founding members of the Southern Football League which they won for the first two years of its existence, and were runners-up in its third. During this period the club was invited to join the Second Division of the Football League but the committee turned down the opportunity, partly due to the expected increase in travel expenses but also to stay loyal to the Southern League. They were forced to move to a new ground North Greenwich in 1901, as the Millwall Dock Company wanted to use their land as a timberyard. Millwall Athletic reached the semi-finals of the FA Cup in 1900 and 1903, and were also champions of the Western Football League in 1908 and 1909. On 10 October 1910, Millwall played their last game as an East London club against Woolwich Arsenal in the London Challenge Cup. Millwall won the game 1–0 in front of a crowd of 3000.

Millwall moved to a new stadium, named The Den, in New Cross, South East London in 1910. The club had previously occupied four different grounds in the 25 years since their formation in East London; limited expansion space on the Isle of Dogs meant The Lions had to move to boost support and attendances. The estimated cost of The Den was £10,000. The first match played at the new ground was on 22 October 1910 against reigning Southern League champions Brighton & Hove Albion, who won 1–0.

=== Entering the Football League: 1920–1940 ===
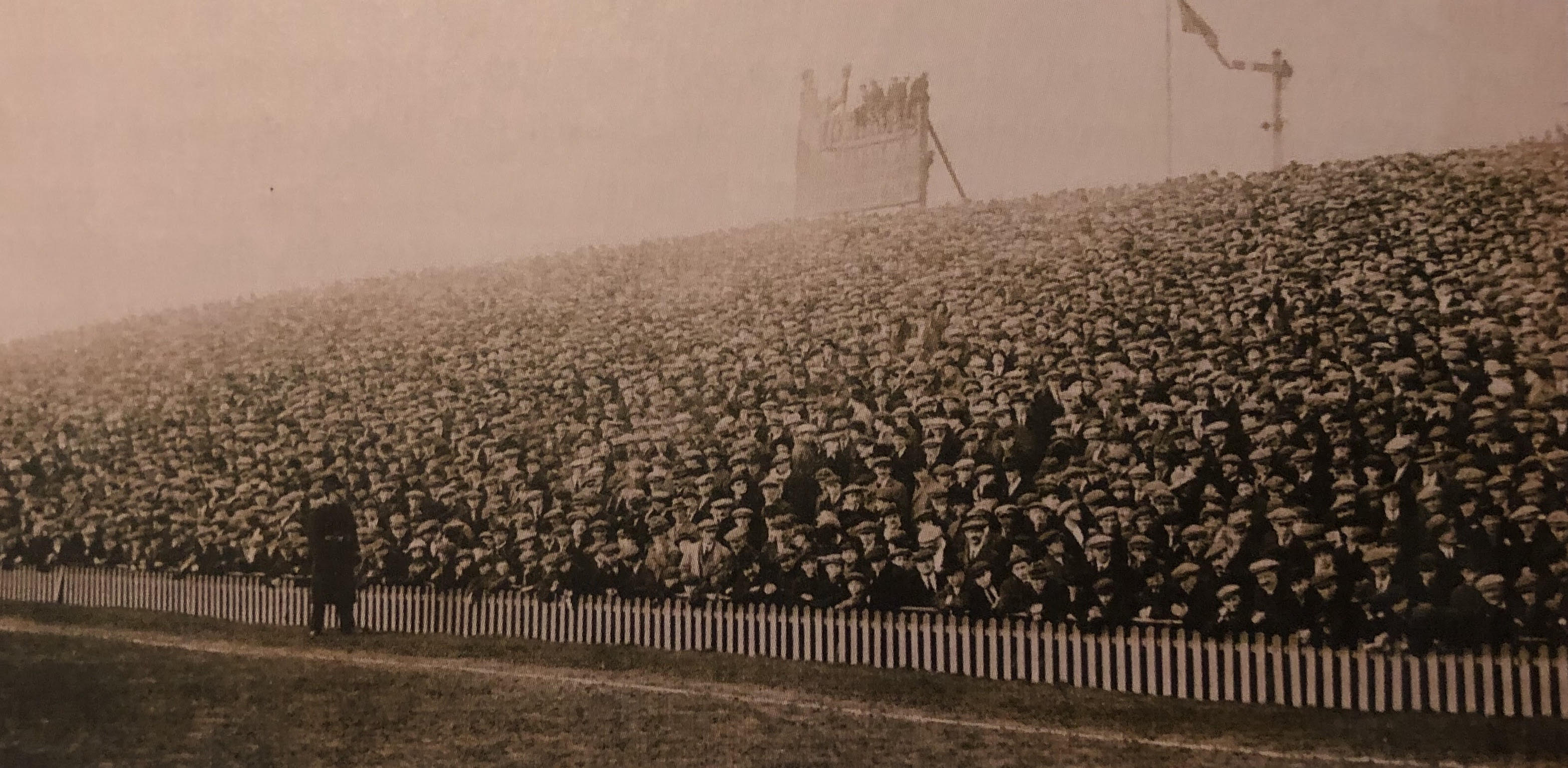
Millwall fans watch a South London derby against Crystal Palace in a 1922 FA Cup replay.

Millwall, who had now also dropped "Athletic" from their name, were invited to join the Football League in 1920 for the 1920–21 season, along with 22 other clubs, through the creation of the new Football League Third Division. The Southern League was shorn of its status, with almost all its clubs deciding to leave—Millwall followed suit. Millwall's first Football League match was on 28 August 1920 at The Den, and they were 2–0 winners against Bristol Rovers.

In the 1925–26 season Millwall had 11 consecutive clean sheets, a Football League record, which they hold jointly with York City and Reading. Millwall became known as a hard-fighting Cup team and competed in various memorable matches, notably defeating three-time league winners and reigning champions Huddersfield Town 3–1 in the third round of the 1926–27 FA Cup. In the 1927–28 season Millwall won the Third Division South title and scored 87 goals at home in the league, an English record which still stands. Matches against Sunderland and Derby County saw packed crowds of 48,000-plus in the 1930s and 1940s. Their 1937 FA Cup run saw Millwall reach the semi-finals for the third time, and a fifth-round game against Derby still stands as Millwall's record attendance of 48,762. Millwall were the 11th best supported team in England in 1939, despite being in the Second Division. Millwall were one of the most financially wealthy clubs in England. The club proposed plans to improve the Den and signed international players. Winger Reg 'JR' Smith was capped twice, scoring two goals for England in 1938. The Lions were pushing for promotion to the First Division toward the end of the decade, but one week into the 1939–40 season, World War II broke out and Millwall were robbed of their aim.

=== Wartime doldrums and relegation to fourth tier: 1940–1965 ===
Annual table positions of Millwall in the Football League, 1920–2022.

On 7 April 1945, Millwall appeared in a Football League War Cup final at Wembley Stadium against Chelsea, but because it was a wartime cup final it is not acknowledged in the record books. With the war in Europe in its last days, the number of spectators allowed to attend games was relaxed. The attendance was 90,000, the largest crowd Millwall have ever played in front of, which included King George VI, whom the team were introduced to before kick-off.

The loss of so many young men during the Second World War made it difficult for clubs to retain their former status. This was especially true for Millwall, who appeared to suffer more than most. The Den sustained severe bomb damage on 19 April 1943, and one week later a fire, determined to have been caused by a discarded cigarette, also destroyed an entire stand. The club accepted offers from neighbours Charlton Athletic, Crystal Palace and West Ham United to stage games at their grounds. On 24 February 1944, Millwall returned to The Den, to play in an all-standing stadium. This was achieved with considerable volunteer labour by Lions fans.

Millwall's fortunes fluctuated in the immediate post war years, they were relegated to Division Three South in 1948 and had to apply for re-election to the league in 1950 after finishing in the bottom two. An upswing in fortunes saw Millwall finish 5th, 4th, and then runners up in Division Three South in 1952–53 season; but with only the Champions being promoted, Millwall found themselves stuck in the third tier despite averaging crowds of over 20,000. Millwall then suffered a down swing in fortunes with a number of bottom-half finishes. One highlight of the period was one of the biggest giant-killing upsets in the Fourth Round of the 1956–57 FA Cup on 26 January 1957, when Millwall beat Newcastle United 2–1 in front of a crowd of 45,646. Millwall suffered the ill fortune of becoming a founding member of Division Four in 1958. While initially suffering from this reorganisation, the de-regionalisation of Third Division North and Third Division South opened up the way for promotion via the runner up spots. Millwall won the Division Four Title in 1962 with the help of 23 Goals from Peter Burridge and 22 from Dave Jones. They were relegated again in the 1963–64 season, but were to bounce back by winning back-to-back promotions as runner up. This is the last time Millwall played in the fourth tier.

=== Unbeaten home record and the class of '71: 1965–1986 ===
Later in the decade, Millwall established a record of 59 home games without defeat (43 wins and 16 draws) from 22 August 1964 to 14 January 1967. During this spell, Millwall played 55 different teams, kept 35 clean sheets, scored 112 goals and conceded 33. This was thanks largely to managers Billy Gray, who laid the foundations, and Benny Fenton, a former player who continued to build on Gray's side. All the players, which included winger Barry Rowan, goalkeeper Alex Stepney, defender Tom Wilson and strikers Hugh Curran and Len Julians, were presented with a commemorative gold cigarette lighter by the Football Association. The record was eventually broken by Liverpool, who were unbeaten for 63 games at home between 1978 and 1981. This era was also notable for the appearance of Frank Peterson on 30 November 1968 in an away game at Portsmouth. Peterson was the first Black player to represent the club.

In the early 1970s, the Millwall team included many notable and memorable players, now remembered by some fans as "The Class of '71". This was a team that included; goalkeeper Bryan King, defender Harry Cripps, goalscoring midfielder Derek Possee, Millwall's most capped international player to date, Eamon Dunphy and the club's longest serving player, Barry Kitchener. They missed out on promotion to Division One by one point. By remaining unbeaten at home in Division Two for the 1971–72 season, Millwall became the only club to go through an entire season without losing a match at home in four different divisions 1927–28 Division Three South, 1964–65 Division Four, 1965–66 Division Three and 1971–72 Division Two. In 1974, Millwall hosted the first game to be played on a Sunday against Fulham. The Lions reached the quarter-finals of the League Cup in 1974, and again in 1977.

George Graham managed Millwall from 1983 to 1986, and during that time he guided the club to a Football League Group Cup win, beating Lincoln City 3–2 in the final in the 1982–83 season. The 1984–85 season was particularly successful, Millwall reached the FA Cup quarter-finals and gained promotion to the Second Division, going unbeaten at home again in Division Three, winning 18 games and drawing five. In the FA Cup they were beaten 1–0 by First Division Luton Town at Kenilworth Road. The match is remembered for all the wrong reasons, after hooligans rioted at the game. 81 people (including 31 police officers) were injured in the disturbances.

=== Promotion to top tier, new stadium, and administration: 1987–2000 ===
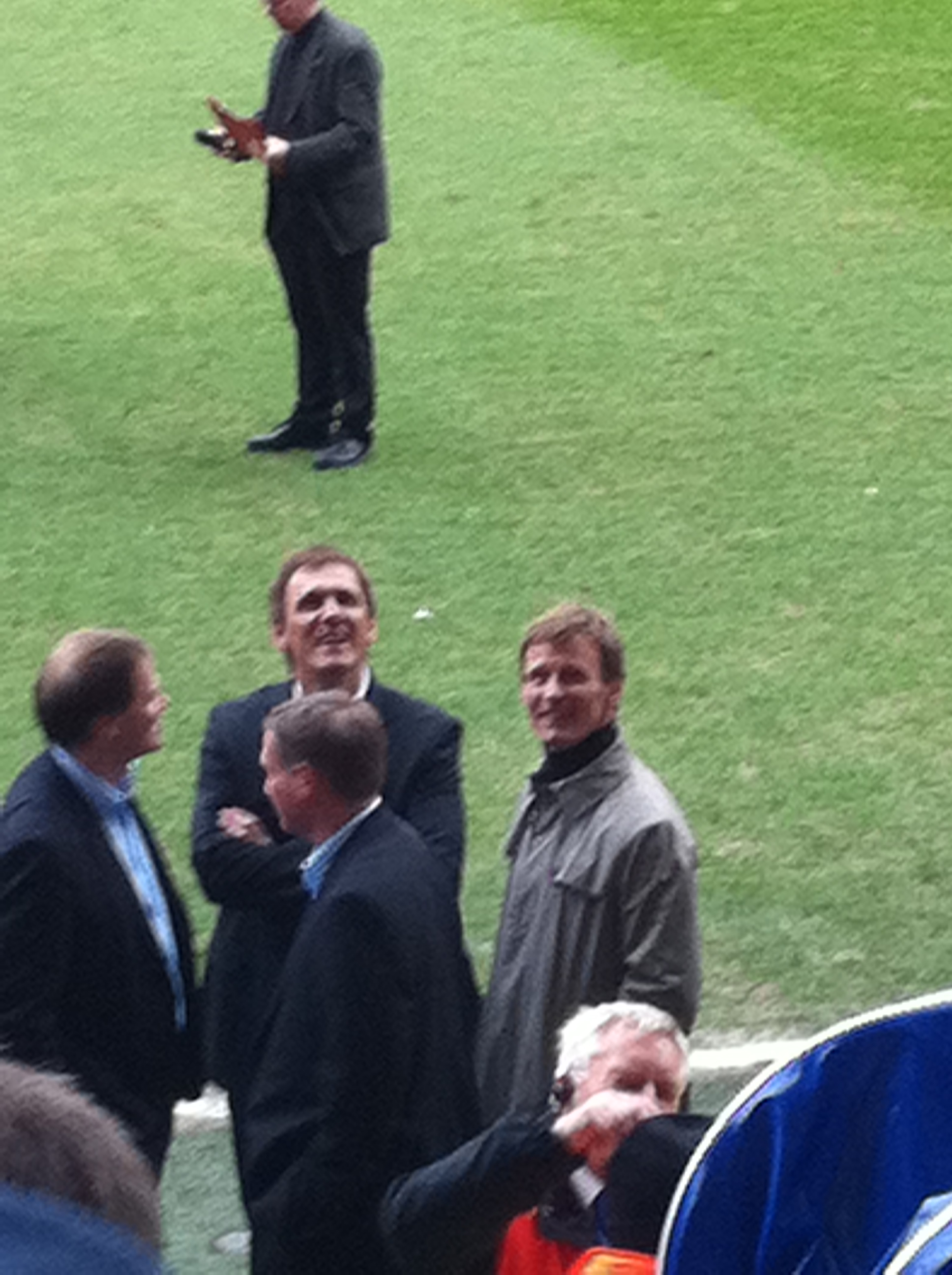
In their three seasons together at Millwall, Tony Cascarino and Teddy Sheringham scored 99 goals between them.

Graham's replacement was Glaswegian John Docherty. In his second season as manager, Millwall won the Second Division championship and gained promotion to the top flight of English football for the first time in the club's history. Starting the 1988–89 season strongly, Millwall topped the league on 1 October 1988 having played six games (winning four and drawing two) and rarely slipped out of the top five before Christmas. This was mainly due to Tony Cascarino and Teddy Sheringham, who scored 99 goals between them in three seasons playing together. Millwall's first top division season ended with a tenth-place finish, which was the lowest place occupied by the club all season. The following season, they briefly led the league for one night in September 1989 after beating Coventry City 4–1, but won only two more games all season and were relegated in 20th place at the end of the 1989–90 season.

Just before relegation was confirmed, Docherty was sacked and replaced by ex-Middlesbrough manager Bruce Rioch. Striker Teddy Sheringham was the highest-scoring player throughout the Football League in the 1990–91 season with 38 goals, was sold to Nottingham Forest for £2 million after Millwall's 6–2 defeat to Brighton & Hove Albion in the Second Division play-offs. Rioch left Millwall in 1992 to be succeeded by Irish defender Mick McCarthy. McCarthy guided Millwall to third place in the new Division One at the end of the 1993–94 season, losing to Derby County in Millwall's second playoffs appearance. This was their first season at a new ground, at first known as The New Den (to distinguish it from its predecessor) but now called simply The Den, which was opened by the Labour party leader John Smith on 4 August 1993. The new ground was the first all-seater stadium to be built in England after the Taylor report on the Hillsborough disaster. The Lions knocked Arsenal out of the 1994–95 FA Cup in a third-round replay, beating them 2–0 at Highbury. They also reached the quarter-finals of the League Cup for the third time in their history in 1995. McCarthy resigned to take charge of the Republic of Ireland national team on 5 February 1996, shortly after Millwall had been knocked off the top of the Division One table by Sunderland, following a 6–0 defeat.

Jimmy Nicholl of Raith Rovers was appointed as McCarthy's replacement, but could not reverse the slump in form which saw Millwall relegated at the end of the 1995–96 season in 22nd place. Just five months earlier they had been top of Division One, but now Millwall found themselves in the third tier for the 1996–97 season. The club experienced severe financial difficulties that resulted in them being placed in financial administration for a short time. Nicholl was relieved of his duties and John Docherty returned on a short-term basis to stabilise the club.

Millwall came out of administration, and new chairman Theo Paphitis appointed ex-West Ham United manager Billy Bonds as manager. The 1997–98 season was not a successful one, with the club hovering close to relegation to the fourth tier. Bonds was sacked and replaced by Keith "Rhino" Stevens, with Alan McLeary as his assistant. McLeary was later promoted to the role of joint-manager alongside Stevens. Stevens and McLeary led Millwall to their first ever official appearance at Wembley Stadium. The Lions reached the 1999 Football League Trophy Final with a golden goal win against Gillingham in the semi-finals, and a 2–1 aggregate victory over Walsall in the regional final. They faced Wigan Athletic in the final but, while playing in front of 49,000 of their own fans, lost 1–0 to an injury-time goal. Millwall finished 5th and lost 1–0 on aggregate to Wigan in the Second Division play-off semi-finals of the 1999–2000 season, their third play-off semi-final loss.

=== Division 2 Champions, FA Cup Final, and European football: 2000–2007 ===
Mark McGhee was named as Millwall's new manager for the 2000–01 season in September 2000, and eight months later the club won promotion as Division Two champions. They finished with 93 points, a club record, with striker Neil Harris winning the golden boot with 27 league goals. Along with Harris, the turn of the century saw the emergence of a 'Golden Generation' of players, some of whom would go on to play in the Premier League such as Tim Cahill, Paul Ifill, Lucas Neill, and Steven Reid. Winning the first match of the 2001–02 season 4–0 at home to Norwich City set the team up well for a good year, in which Millwall finished 4th and qualified for the Division One play-offs, but lost to eventual winners Birmingham City 2–1, their 4th playoff semi-final loss. Millwall finished 9th in the 2002–03 season, but McGhee left Millwall by "mutual consent" in October.

In October 2003 ex-Chelsea and England player Dennis Wise became caretaker, and subsequently permanent player-manager, of the club for the 2003-04 season. In his first season in charge Wise led the team to finish four points off of the play-offs, and to the first FA Cup Final in their history. Millwall beat Sunderland in the semi-final at Old Trafford, with Tim Cahill, who finished the season as Millwall's top scorer, scoring the winning goal, to set up a final against Manchester United. When Millwall took to the field at the Millennium Stadium in Cardiff on 22 May 2004 they were only the second team from outside the top flight to play in the Cup final since 1982, and were the first team from outside the Premier League to reach the final since the foundation of the top tier in 1992. The club was missing 16 players from their squad due to suspension or injury, but kept the score at 0-0 until 1 minute before half-time when Gary Neville's cross was headed in by Cristiano Ronaldo. Millwall eventually lost the 2004 FA Cup Final 3–0, courtesy of a Ruud van Nistelrooy brace. As United had already qualified for the UEFA Champions League, Millwall were assured of playing in the UEFA Cup. Midfielder Curtis Weston, substituted for Wise with one minute of normal time remaining, became the youngest Cup final player in history at 17 years 119 days, beating the 125-year-old record of James F. M. Prinsep. In the 2004–05 UEFA Cup, Millwall lost 4–2 on aggregate in the first round proper to Hungarian champions Ferencváros, with Wise scoring both Millwall's goals.

In 2005, Theo Paphitis announced that he was stepping down as chairman of the club with Jeff Burnige to replace him from May 2005. At the end of the 2004–05 season, manager Dennis Wise announced that he was leaving as he was unable to form a working relationship with the new chairman. The following three seasons, 2005–08, saw 11 different permanent and temporary managers take the reins. Former Millwall striker Steve Claridge was announced as the new player-manager of Millwall. However, when Burnige then stepped down just two months after taking up the post, it was announced on 27 July 2005 that Claridge had been sacked after just 36 days, without ever taking charge of the team in a competitive match. Former Wolverhampton Wanderers manager Colin Lee replaced him but lasted only five months in charge of the club. On 21 December, with the club bottom of the Championship, Lee became the club's Director of Football and was replaced as manager by 32-year-old player Dave Tuttle, on a short-term contract until the end of the 2005–06 season. Millwall experienced a tough season, having had four managers. Their 13 goals scored at home was the second worst in Football League history. Their relegation to League One was confirmed on 17 April 2006 with a 2–0 loss against Southampton. In the closed season Nigel Spackman was appointed as the new manager, but he lasted only four months after a string of bad results. In September 2006, Theo Paphitis (chairman from 1997 to 2005) ended his nine-year association with the club after a year-long spell as a non-executive director. On 19 March 2007, Willie Donachie signed a two-year contract following some progress in the latter half of 2006-07 which had seen the club climb to 11th place in the league. Before Donachie took charge, Millwall had taken only six points from their first ten games. In the 2007–08 season Millwall sat bottom of the table at the beginning of October. Donachie was sacked on 8 October, with Richard Shaw and Colin West becoming caretaker managers.

=== New owner, stability, and first play-off success: 2007–2015 ===
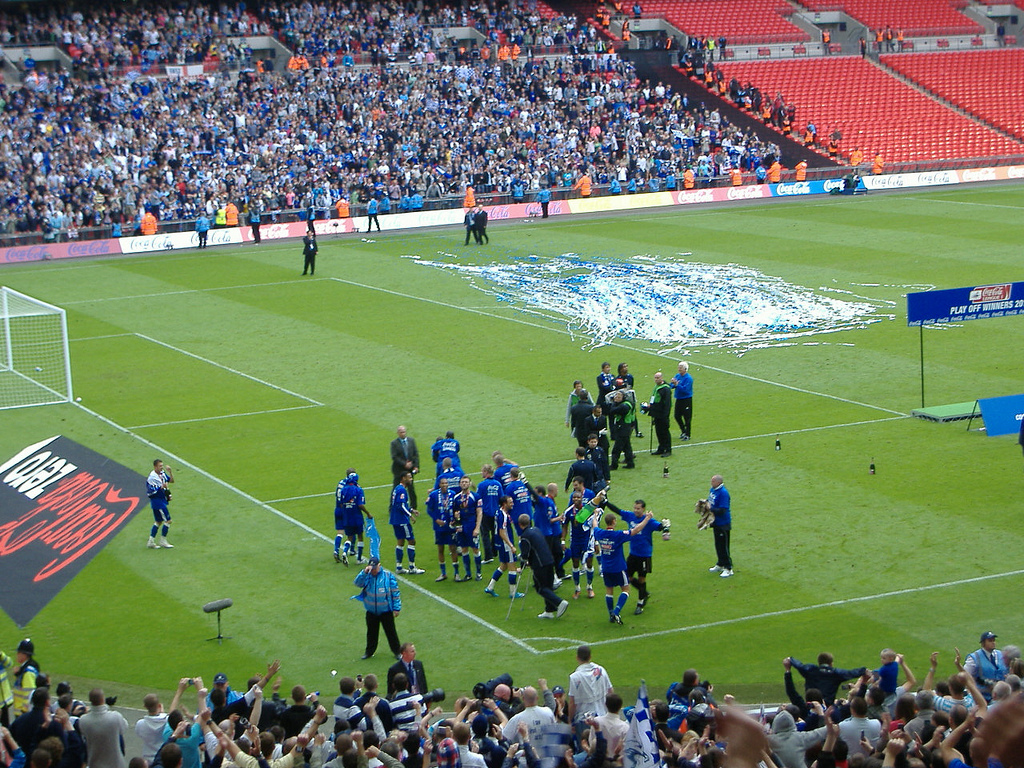
Millwall players celebrating promotion to the Football League Championship at Wembley Stadium in 2010.

In March 2007, Chestnut Hill Ventures, led by American and future chairman John Berylson, invested £5 million into the club. Millwall appointed Kenny Jackett as new manager on 6 November 2007. Over the course of the next two seasons, Jackett led Millwall to two top six finishes in League One, in fifth and third place respectively. On 13 January 2009, Harris broke Teddy Sheringham's all-time goal scoring record for Millwall during the 3–2 away win against Crewe Alexandra with his 112th goal for the club. After a play-off final defeat in the 2008–09 season against Scunthorpe United and losing out on automatic promotion on the last day of the 2009–10 season to Leeds United by one point, Millwall made it back to Wembley, finally breaking the play-off hoodoo run of five successive failures, with a 1–0 win in the 2010 League One play-off final against Swindon Town, securing a return to the Football League Championship after a four-year absence.

After a strong start to the 2012–13 season, including a 13-game unbeaten run and flirting with the play-offs, Millwall finished poorly, with only five wins in the last 23 games, narrowly avoiding relegation on the last day of the season. Their poor league form coincided with reaching the semi-final of the FA Cup for the fifth time in their history. They played Wigan Athletic at Wembley Stadium on 14 April 2013, losing 2–0 to the eventual cup winners. Kenny Jackett resigned on 7 May 2013. He was Millwall's fourth-longest serving manager having managed 306 games. Jackett died in June 2026 at the age of 64; Millwall said he would "forever go down as one of Millwall Football Club's greatest managers". The club paid tribute to him with a pre-match ceremony and a minute's applause before its home match against Norwich City on 22 August 2026. After a month of searching, Millwall appointed St Johnstone boss Steve Lomas as their new manager on 6 June 2013. Millwall sacked Lomas on 26 December 2013, after winning only five of his first 22 games in charge.

The club appointed Ian Holloway as their new manager on 6 January 2014, with the club sitting 21st in the Championship table. Millwall went unbeaten in the last eight games of the 2013–14 season and finished in 19th place, four points above the relegation zone. The following season, Holloway was sacked on 10 March 2015 with the team second from bottom in the Championship, and Neil Harris was reinstated as caretaker manager until the end of the season. He was unable to ensure survival, however, as Millwall's relegation to League One was confirmed on 28 April with one game of the 2014–15 season still to play. Harris was confirmed as Millwall's permanent manager the next day.

=== Harris era, return to Championship, and FA Cup giant-killers: 2015–2023 ===
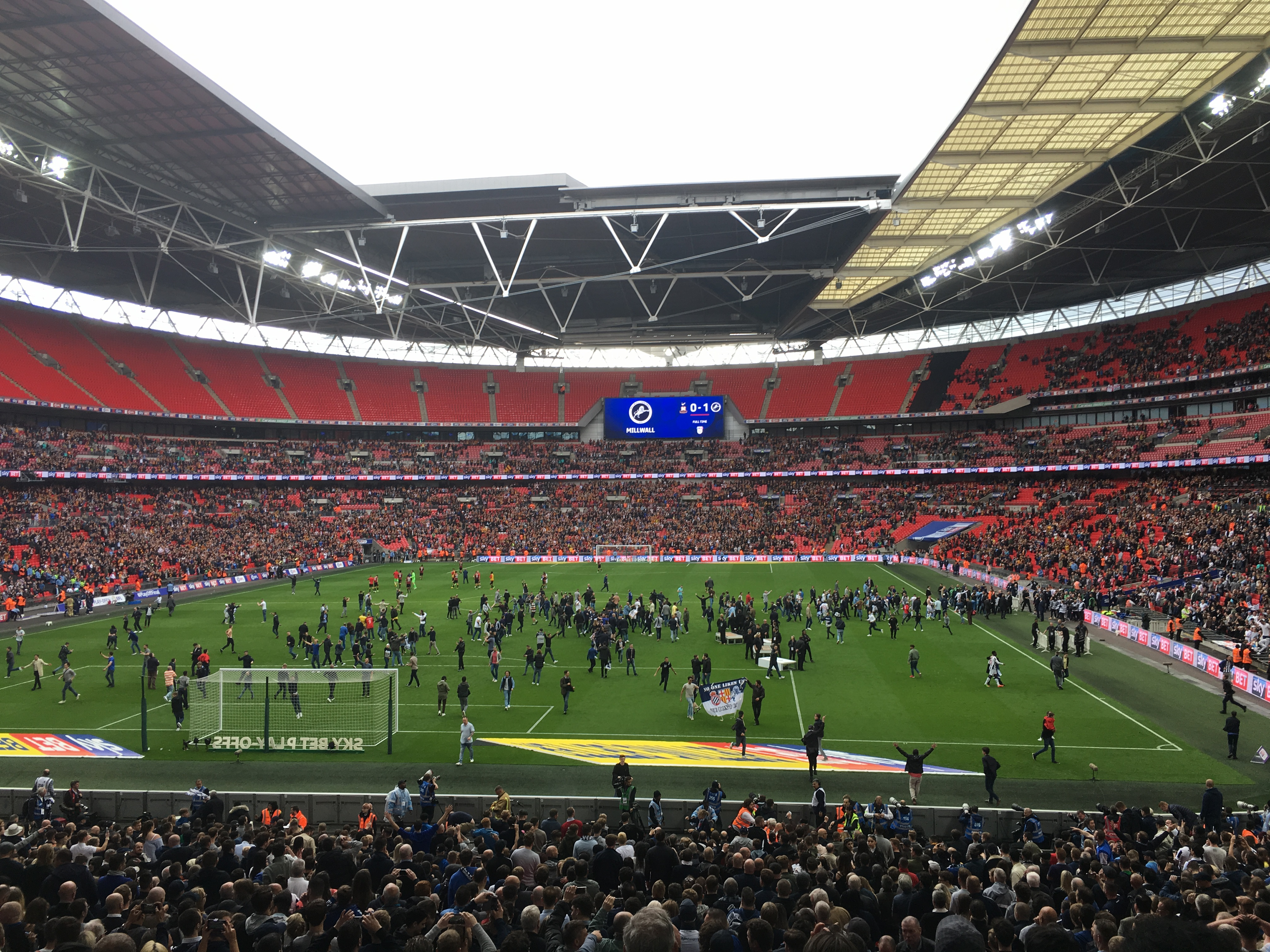
The first pitch invasion at the new Wembley Stadium by Millwall fans, May 2017

In his first full season in charge, Harris led Millwall to a fourth-place finish in League One and a play-off final at Wembley, which the Lions lost 3–1 to Barnsley. In the 2016–17 FA Cup, Millwall reached the quarter-finals for the tenth time in their history. Millwall made it to the League One play-off final at Wembley for the second successive year, after beating Scunthorpe United 3–2 in the semi-final. They were promoted back to the Championship following a 1–0 play-off final victory over Bradford City, thanks to an 85th-minute winner from Steve Morison.

In the 2018–19 FA Cup, Millwall reached the quarter-finals for an 11th time in their history, losing to Premier League side Brighton on penalties. This season Millwall broke their club transfer fee record twice, firstly buying Tom Bradshaw from Barnsley for £1.25 million, and then a week later buying midfielder Ryan Leonard from Sheffield United for £1.5 million. They also broke their record received for a player, selling George Saville to Middlesbrough for £8 million.

On 3 October 2019, Neil Harris resigned as Millwall manager with the club sitting in 18th place with two wins from their first ten Championship games. Harris led Millwall to Wembley twice, with one promotion, and to two FA Cup quarter-finals during his tenure. On 21 October 2019, Harris was replaced by former Stoke City boss Gary Rowett. Rowett inspired a dramatic upturn in form; losing only two matches of his first 15 league games, which saw the 2019–20 season end in an 8th-placed finish, just two points off the play-offs. Rowett guided the club to a mid-table 11th place in his second season in charge. The following 2021–22 season saw an improved 9th-place finish, missing out on the play-offs on the final day of the season. In the summer of 2022 Millwall broke their transfer record to sign Dutchman Zian Flemming for a reported £1.7m. Millwall went close again in 2022–23. Millwall required a win on the final day of the season to secure a play-off spot but gave up a 3–1 lead, losing 4–3 to Blackburn Rovers and eventually finishing 8th with Flemming starring as their top goal scorer.

=== Death of chairman, second tier consistency and play-offs: 2023–present ===
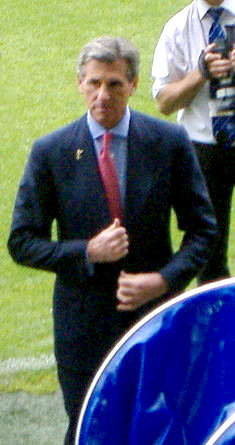
Millwall's late American chairman John Berylson, who owned the club from 2007 to 2023.

On 4 July 2023, the club announced the death of owner and chairman John Berylson, who died in a car accident. His son, James, was named as his replacement as chairman. On 18 October 2023, the club announced it had mutually agreed to part company with first team manager Gary Rowett. On 6 November 2023, Millwall confirmed England under-20s manager Joe Edwards as their new head coach. After a run of four wins in 19 games, Edwards was sacked by Millwall on 21 February 2024. He was replaced by former player and record club goalscorer Neil Harris, his third spell in charge of the Lions. Under Harris, the club finished 13th.

On 15 June 2024, the club's first-choice goalkeeper Matija Sarkic died while on international duty with Montenegro. On 10 December 2024, with Millwall 11th in the Championship, Harris said he would be leaving the club following the side's match at Middlesbrough on 14 December. Alex Neil was appointed as Harris's successor, and led Millwall to eighth, just missing out on the play-offs on the final day of the season. In the 2025–26 season Millwall finished third, losing 2–0 on aggregate to Hull City in the play-off semi-final. Their 83 points was the club's highest ever points total in the second tier, exceeding the 82 points won by the 1987–88 Second Division title-winning side over a 44-game season, and their 18 clean sheets were the most of any Championship team that season. The club's record Football League attendance at The Den was broken twice during the season: 19,004 spectators watched a 4–0 win over Charlton Athletic in January 2026, and 19,153 attended a 3–1 defeat by Portsmouth the following month. The record was broken again on 22 August 2026, when 19,564 watched a 3–0 win over Norwich City, the first match at which home supporters were allowed in the North Stand. It was surpassed twice more during the 2026–27 season: 19,639 watched a 2–2 draw with West Ham United on 19 September 2026, and 19,834 saw a 2–2 draw with Lincoln City on 17 October 2026.

== Colours, crest and nickname ==
=== Kit ===
Millwall Rovers first home kit from their 1885–86 season, which the team wore for the 125-year anniversary of the club in the 2010–11 season.

The leaping lion has been on the club's crest from 1979 to 1999, and from 2007 to present. This version was used from 1992 to 1994.

Millwall's traditional kit has predominantly consisted of blue shirts, white shorts and blue socks throughout their 125-year history. For the first 50 years, up until 1936, they played in a traditional navy blue, similar to the colours of Scotland national team. This colour was chosen because it paid homage to the Scottish roots of the club, with the nucleus of the first Millwall Rovers squad being from Dundee. In 1936, newly appointed Millwall manager Charlie Hewitt opted to change the kit colour from navy blue to a lighter royal blue, and the team played in this colour for the best part of 74 years, with the exception of 1968–75 and 1999–2001, in which the team played in an all-white strip. Their kit for the 2010–11 season celebrated the 125th anniversary of the club, with Millwall adopting the darker navy blue of their first strip. The club has retained this colour since. As for change colours, white shirts and blue shorts or yellow shirts and black shorts have been the Lions primary away colours. They have also played in red and black stripes, all grey, all orange, all red, and green and white stripes. Millwall wore a special one-off camouflage kit to commemorate the centenary of the First World War against Brentford on 8 November 2014. It went on sale to fans, with proceeds going to Headley Court, a rehabilitation centre for injured members of the British Armed Forces.

=== Badge ===
The club crest has been a rampant lion since 1936, which was also introduced by Charlie Hewitt. There have been many variations of the lion; the first was a single red lion, often mistakenly said to be chosen because of the club's Scottish roots. The lion bore a striking resemblance to signs used by pubs named The Red Lion. From 1956 to 1974 Millwall's crest was two leaping red lions facing each other. Former chairman Theo Paphitis brought back the badge in 1999, where it was used for a further eight years. The current crest is a leaping lion, which first appeared on a Millwall kit in 1979. It remained until 1999 and was re-introduced again in 2007. The club mascot is a giant lion called Zampa, named after Zampa Road, the road The Den is located on.

=== The Lions ===
The team nickname is The Lions, previously The Dockers. The original Dockers name arose from the job of many of the club's supporters in the early 1900s. The club did not like the nickname and changed it after press headlined Millwall as 'Lions of the South', after knocking Football League leaders Aston Villa out of the 1899–1900 FA Cup. Millwall, then a Southern League side, went on to reach the semi-final. The club adopted the motto: We Fear No Foe Where E'er We Go. In the 2000s the club started to recognise its unique link with London docks by introducing Dockers' Days, and archiving the club's dock roots in the Millwall FC Museum. Dockers' Days bring together past successful Millwall teams who parade on the pitch at half-time. Supporters who were dockers are allowed to attend the game without charge. In 2011, Millwall officially named the east stand of The Den as the 'Dockers Stand' in honour of the club's former nickname.

=== Kit sponsors and manufacturers ===
For the 2013–14 season, Millwall chose the charity Prostate Cancer UK to sponsor their shirt for free.

1936–39 strip. The first change of colour from navy blue to royal blue. This was the first appearance of the lion rampant crest on the kit.

The two red lions first appeared on the Millwall crest in 1956.

Year	Kit manufacturer	Main shirt sponsor	Secondary sponsor(s)
1975–80	Bukta	None	
1980–83	Osca	None	
1983–85	Osca	LDDC	
1985–86	Gimer	London Docklands	
1986–87	Spall	London Docklands	
1987–89	Spall	Lewisham Council	
1989–90	Spall	Millwall	
1990–91	Spall	Lewisham Council	
1991–92	Spall	Fairview Homes PLC	
1992–93	Bukta	Fairview	
1993–94	Bukta	Captain Morgan	
1994–96	Asics	Captain Morgan	
1996–97	Asics	South London Press	
1997–99	Asics	L!VE TV	
1999–2001	Strikeforce	Giorgio	
2001–03	Strikeforce	24 Seven	
2003–04	Strikeforce	Ryman	
2004–05	Strikeforce	Beko	
2005–06	Lonsdale	Beko	
2006–07	Lonsdale	Oppida	
2007–08	Bukta	Oppida	K&T Heating Services Ltd
2008–10	Bukta	CYC	Oppida
2010–11	Macron	CYC	Matchbet
2011–12	Macron	Racing+	Sasco Sauces
2012–13	Macron	Racing+	BestPay
2013–14	Macron	Prostate Cancer UK	Wallis Teagan
2014–15	Macron	Euroferries	Wallis Teagan
2015–16	Macron	Wallis Teagan	
2016–17	Erreà	Wallis Teagan	
2017–18	Erreà	TW Drainage & EnergyBet	DCS Roofing
2018–19	Macron	TW Drainage & EnergyBet	DCS Roofing
2019–22	Macron	Huski Chocolate	
2022–23	Hummel	Huski Chocolate	
2023–24	Erreà	Huski Chocolate	
2024–25	Erreà	My Guava	
2025–	Erreà	Wiggett Group	

== Stadiums ==
=== History ===
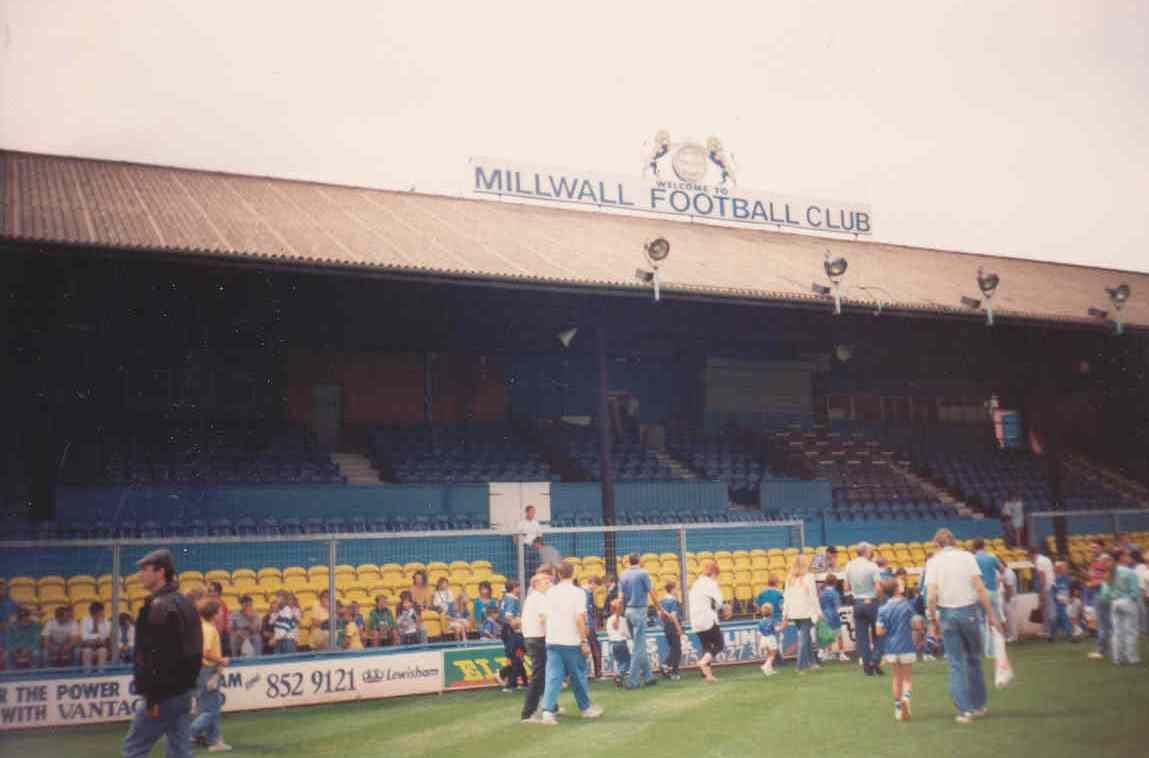
A Junior Lions day at The Den in 1988

Millwall began life on the Isle of Dogs and inhabited four different grounds in the club's first 25 years. Their first home was a piece of waste ground called Glengall Road, where they only stayed for one year. From 1886 to 1890 they played behind The Lord Nelson pub on East Ferry Road, which was known as the Lord Nelson Ground, before being forced to leave by the landlady, who received a better offer for its use.

They moved to their third home, The Athletic Grounds, on 6 September 1890. This was their first purpose-built ground, with a grandstand that seated 600 people and an overall capacity of between 10,000 and 15,000. The club was forced to move on again though, this time by the Millwall Dock Company who wanted to use it as a timberyard. They relocated in 1901 to a location near their second home, which became known as North Greenwich. They remained an east London club for a further nine years, with the last game played on the Isle of Dogs on 8 October 1910 against Portsmouth, which Millwall won 3–1.

On 22 October 1910, Millwall crossed the river to South East London, moving to Cold Blow Lane in New Cross. The fifth ground was called The Den, built at a cost of £10,000 by noted football ground architect Archibald Leitch. The first game played there was against Brighton & Hove Albion, which Brighton won 1–0. Millwall remained there for 83 years, until moving to their sixth and current ground, at first known as The New Den but now called simply The Den, on 4 August 1993. The ground has an all-seated capacity of 20,146. A Sporting CP team, managed by Bobby Robson helped open the ground by playing a friendly, which The Lions lost 2–1. The ground's record attendance is 20,093, for an FA Cup tie against Arsenal in 1994. In June 2025 the club announced plans to introduce safe standing at The Den, with rails allowing up to 2,093 supporters to stand in the upper tiers of the North Stand and Dockers Stand, without any change to the stadium's capacity. Home supporters were first allowed in the North Stand for the match against Norwich City on 22 August 2026.

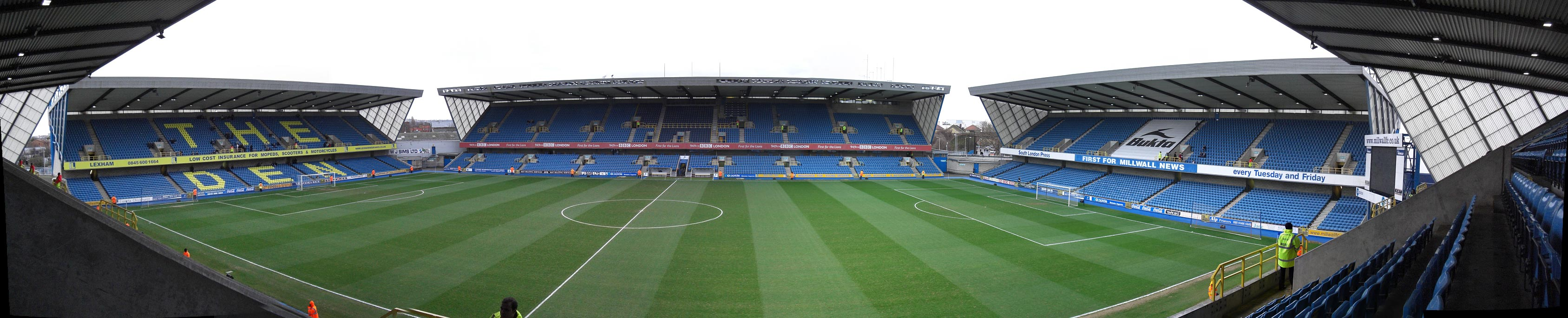
A panoramic view of The Den from the upper Dockers Stand.
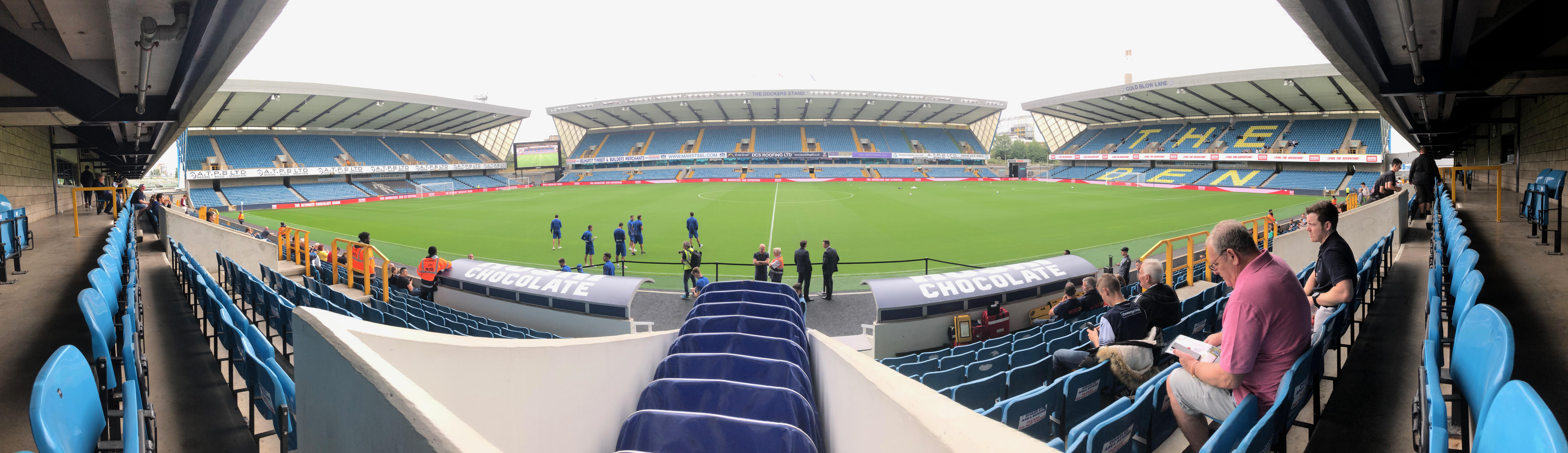
A panorama view of The Den from behind the players tunnel in the lower Barry Kitchener Stand.

=== Bermondsey redevelopment controversy and the Den's future ===
In September 2016 Lewisham Council approved a compulsory purchase order (CPO) of land surrounding The Den rented by Millwall, as part of a major redevelopment of the "New Bermondsey" area. The plans were controversial because the developer, Renewal, is controlled by offshore companies with unclear ownership, and is seen by the club and local community to be profiteering by demolishing existing homes and businesses as well as Millwall's car-park and the Millwall Community Trust facility to build up to 2,400 new private homes, with no social housing. The club contemplated the possibility of having to relocate to Kent. Millwall had submitted their own plans for regeneration centred around the club itself, but the council voted in favour of Renewal's plans. In December 2016 Private Eye reported how Renewal had been founded by a former Lewisham Council leader and senior officer, suggesting potential bias, and that the decision to approve Renewal's plans may have been made as far back as 2013 despite the fact that no due diligence had been able to be carried out by PricewaterhouseCoopers due to "poor" and "limited" access to information and management at Renewal, which is controlled from the Isle of Man and British Virgin Islands. In the face of mounting community opposition and media scrutiny, the Council said in January 2017 it will not proceed with the CPO. However, it was later reported to be taking legal advice regarding other avenues of securing the CPO, and Council cabinet members will decide how to proceed after a "review". Private Eye reported that Millwall are continuing to explore relocation options in Kent.

On 9 May 2024, Millwall secured a 999-year lease for The Den from the council, after approval from the Mayor of Lewisham. The new lease secured the club's future in London and removed restrictions on developing the area surrounding the stadium, also giving Millwall development rights to build new homes, leisure and community spaces in New Bermondsey.

== Traditional songs ==
A tradition at The Den is the playing of the official club song "Let 'em Come", by Roy Green, as Millwall and the opposing team walk onto the pitch. It was specifically written for the club and the lyrics represent old London culture, such as eating jellied eels and having a glass of beer before going to the game. The song ends with all home fans standing, arms raised (usually in the direction of the travelling fans singing the last line, "Let 'em all... come down.... to The Den!" A television drama about a Millwall supporter and ex-docker, starring David Jason, featured a lyric from the song in its title, Come Rain Come Shine. The song was played on repeat at Wembley Stadium after Millwall gained promotion to the Championship in 2010. The song "Shoeshine Boy" by the Mills Blue Rhythm Band was played as the entrance song before "Let 'em Come". In 2004, Millwall released the song "Oh Millwall" that reached number 41 in the UK Singles Chart.

Other songs that have been regularly played at The Den over the years in the build-up to a game include "London Calling" by The Clash, "No Surrender" by Bruce Springsteen, "Town Called Malice" by The Jam and "House of Fun" by Madness, which features the lyric "welcome to the lion's den...". Status Quo's cover version of "Rockin' All Over the World" is played after every home win.

== Rivalries ==
Millwall were listed eighth out of a list of 92 Football League clubs with the most rivals, with West Ham United, Leeds United, Crystal Palace, and Charlton Athletic considering them a major rival. Portsmouth, Everton and Gillingham also share minor rivalries with Millwall, with hooliganism between their fans dating back to the 1970s.

=== Major rivalry with West Ham United ===
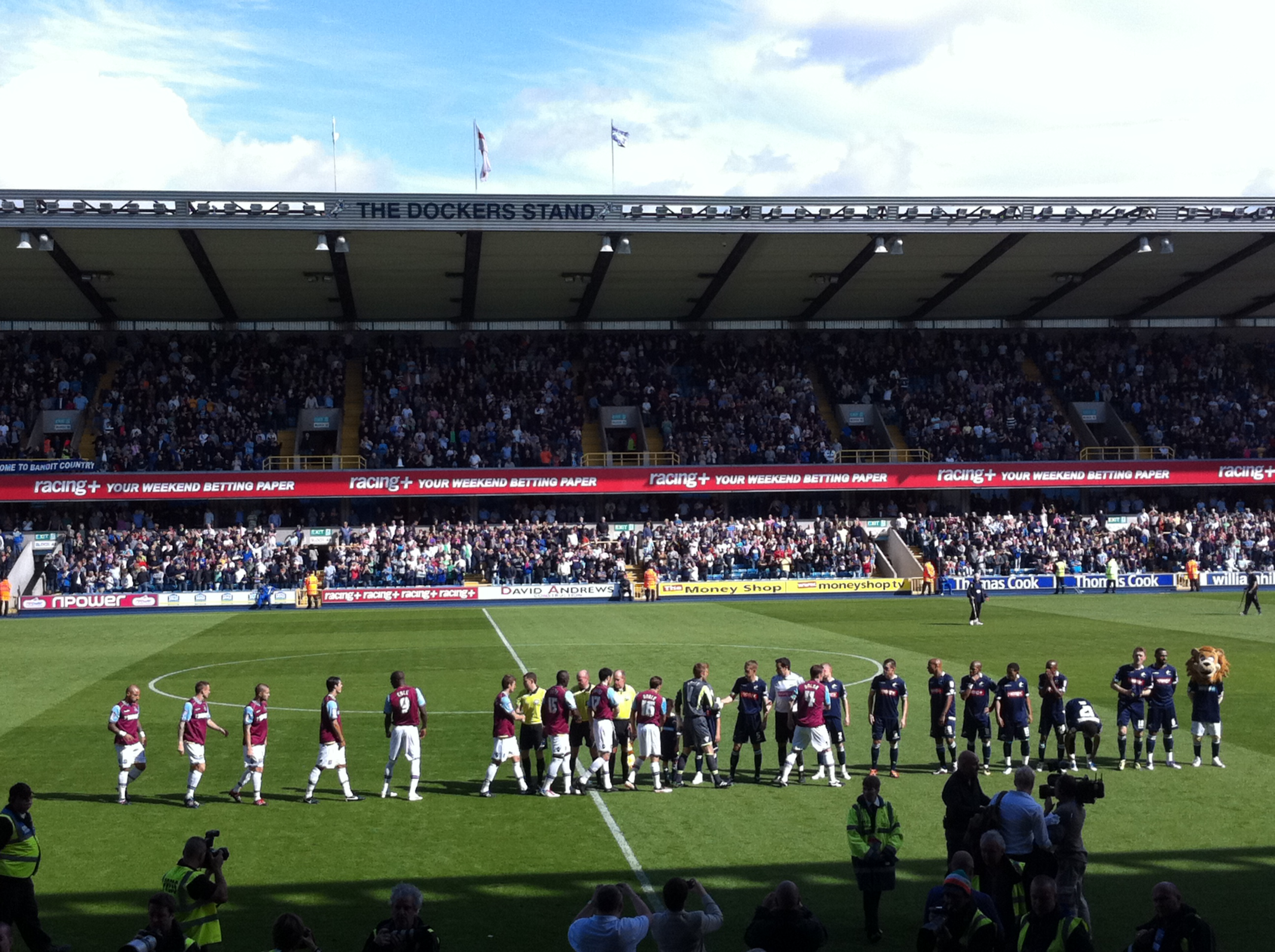
West Ham and Millwall players shake hands before kick-off in 2011.

Millwall's fiercest rival is West Ham United. It is one of the most passionately contested local derbies in football. The two clubs have rarely met in recent years due to them playing in different leagues; the majority of their meetings happened before the First World War, with some 60 meetings between 1899 and 1915. The clubs have played 100 times since the first contest in 1899. Millwall have won 38, drawn 28 and lost 34. The sides most recent meeting was in the Championship in the 2026–27 season, which finished in a 2–2 draw at The Den on 19 September 2026. In preparation for the first derby in 14 years, the Met Police issued a Section 35 dispersal order covering a large part of South London, from Tower Bridge to Blackheath, and deployed 400 officers across London. West Ham have not won away at Millwall since 1988, and Mohamadou Kanté's late sending-off in the 2026 match was the fourth red card in the previous seven meetings between the sides.

=== Rivalry with Leeds United ===
Millwall share a fierce rivalry with Leeds United. The rivalry between the teams is intensified by both clubs' passionate fans and association with football hooliganism. The clubs' two hooligan firms, the Leeds United Service Crew and the Millwall Bushwackers, were notorious in the 1970s and 80s for their violence, being called "dirty Leeds" and "the scourge of football" respectively. From 1920 to 2003 the sides met just 12 times; competing in different tiers for the majority of their histories, and neither considering the other a rival on the pitch. Since Leeds were relegated from the Premier League in 2004, the teams have met 28 times in 16 years. The rivalry began in League One during the 2007–08 season, with disorder and violent clashes between both sets of fans and the police at Elland Road. It continued into the 2008–09 season; where the teams were vying for promotion to the Championship, culminating in Millwall knocking Leeds out of the League One playoffs at the semi-final stage. In 45 games between the two clubs since 1931, Millwall and Leeds are tied with 20 wins each, with five drawn.

=== South East London derbies ===
Millwall are closest in proximity to Charlton Athletic, with The Den and The Valley being less than four miles (6.4 km) apart. They last met in January 2026, with Millwall beating Charlton 4–0 at the Den. Since their first competitive game in 1921, Millwall have won 38, drawn 27 and lost 12. The Lions are unbeaten in their last fourteen games against Charlton, spanning 30 years, where they have won eight and drawn six. The Lions last played against Crystal Palace in September 2025, in a League Cup tie at Selhurst Park. The game ended 1–1, with Palace winning 4–2 on penalties. In almost 100 competitive games between the two clubs since 1906, Millwall have won 39, drawn 30 and lost 32.

== Players ==
=== Current squad ===
As of 18 October 2026

Note: Flags indicate national team as defined under FIFA eligibility rules; some limited exceptions apply. Players may hold more than one non-FIFA nationality.

No.	Pos.	Nation	Player
1	GK	DEN	Lukas Jensen
2	DF	ENG	Jordi Osei-Tutu
3	DF	ENG	Zak Sturge
4	DF	FRA	Tristan Crama (vice-captain)
5	DF	ENG	Jake Cooper (captain)
6	DF	ENG	Caleb Taylor
7	FW	GLP	Taïryk Arconte
8	MF	BEL	Mathis Servais
9	FW	SRB	Mihailo Ivanović
10	MF	ALG	Camiel Neghli
11	FW	ENG	Romain Esse (on loan from Crystal Palace)
12	DF	IDN	Elkan Baggott
13	FW	SCO	Lyndon Dykes
14	MF	ENG	Jenson Metcalfe
15	GK	NZL	Max Crocombe

No.	Pos.	Nation	Player
16	MF	SCO	Daniel Kelly
17	MF	IRL	Mark Sykes
18	DF	ENG	Ryan Leonard
19	FW	ENG	Josh Coburn
21	MF	AUS	Massimo Luongo
22	FW	ENG	Kyrell Lisbie
23	DF	ENG	Danny Batth
24	MF	BEL	Casper De Norre
25	MF	ENG	Luke Cundle
29	FW	ENG	Zak Lovelace
34	GK	ENG	Filip Marschall
35	FW	FRA	Yanis Issoufou
41	GK	ENG	George Evans
43	GK	ENG	Joel Coleman
45	DF	ENG	Alfie Doughty
49	MF	FRA	Derek Mazou-Sacko

=== Out on loan ===
As of 18 October 2026

Note: Flags indicate national team as defined under FIFA eligibility rules; some limited exceptions apply. Players may hold more than one non-FIFA nationality.

No.	Pos.	Nation	Player
27	DF	ENG	Kamarl Grant (on loan at Bromley until 30 June 2027)
28	FW	ENG	Ajay Matthews (on loan at Exeter City until 30 June 2027)
30	MF	ENG	Rafiq Lamptey (on loan at Chesterfield until 30 June 2027)

No.	Pos.	Nation	Player
31	MF	ENG	Raees Bangura-Williams (on loan at Cambridge United until 30 June 2027)
32	FW	GUY	Sheldon Kendall (on loan at Gillingham until 30 June 2027)
44	MF	ENG	Alfie Massey (on loan at Hornchurch until 3 January 2027)

=== Retired numbers ===
Note: Flags indicate national team as defined under FIFA eligibility rules; some limited exceptions apply. Players may hold more than one non-FIFA nationality.

No.	Pos.	Nation	Player
20	GK	MNE	Matija Sarkic (2023–24) – posthumous honour)

=== Millwall Under 21s ===
As of 2 November 2026.

Note: Flags indicate national team as defined under FIFA eligibility rules; some limited exceptions apply. Players may hold more than one non-FIFA nationality.

No.	Pos.	Nation	Player
26	FW	ENG	Benicio Baker
33	GK	POL	Jakub Przewozny
37	MF	ENG	George Beaumont
38	MF	AFG	Elias Mansor
42	DF	ENG	Harry Taylor
47	FW	ENG	Jack Howland
–	DF	ENG	Lloyd Ofori-Manteaw
–	DF	ENG	Wahab Ojetoro
–	DF	ENG	Aaron Adeniji
–	DF	ENG	George Debell
–	MF	ENG	Tristan Hamann-Chanes
–	MF	ENG	Louis Jacome

No.	Pos.	Nation	Player
–	DF	ENG	Freddie Freedman
48	DF	ENG	Archie Kirby
–	MF	ENG	Jayden Tektas
51	MF	ENG	Sacha Tsugita Vieira
–	FW	ENG	Jaydon Thomas-Smith
–	FW	ENG	Caleb Redhead
–	DF	ENG	Lyndon Snelgrove
–	GK	ENG	Ronnie Sandford (on loan at Dulwich Hamlet)
–	DF	ENG	Lucas Middleton
–	FW	ENG	Tyrese Ndige
–	FW	ENG	Ephraim Osayande

=== Millwall Under 18s ===
As of 15 May 2026.

Note: Flags indicate national team as defined under FIFA eligibility rules; some limited exceptions apply. Players may hold more than one non-FIFA nationality.

No.	Pos.	Nation	Player
—	GK	ENG	Justin Ndikum
—	DF	ENG	Da'rell Archer
—	DF	ENG	Daniel Emuze

No.	Pos.	Nation	Player
55	DF	ENG	Tristan Parkes
—	MF	ENG	Edward Payton
—	FW	ENG	Ayman Shiekh

=== Player of the year ===
As voted by Millwall Supporters Club members and season ticket holders.

Year	Winner
1971	(England) Barry Bridges
1972	(England) Bryan King
1973	(England) Alf Wood
1974	(England) Alf Wood
1975	(England) Phil Summerill
1976	(England) Barry Kitchener
1977	(England) Terry Brisley
1978	(England) Phil Walker
1979	(England) Barry Kitchener
1980	(Wales) John Lyons
1981	(England) Paul Roberts
1982	(England) Dean Horrix
1983	(England) Dean Neal
1984	(England) Anton Otulakowski
1985	(England) Paul Sansome

Year	Winner
1986	(England) Alan McLeary
1987	(England) Brian Horne
1988	(England) Danis Salman
1989	(England) Terry Hurlock
1990	(England) Ian Dawes
1991	(England) Teddy Sheringham
1992	(Northern Ireland) Aidan Davison
1993	(United States) Kasey Keller
1994	(England) Keith Stevens
1995	(England) Andy Roberts
1996	(Wales) Ben Thatcher
1997	(Australia) Lucas Neill
1998	(England) Paul Shaw
1999	(England) Neil Harris
2000	(England) Stuart Nethercott

Year	Winner
2001	(England) Matt Lawrence
2002	(England) Steve Claridge
2003	(Trinidad and Tobago) Tony Warner
2004	(England) Darren Ward
2005	(England) Darren Ward
2006	(England) David Livermore
2007	(England) Richard Shaw
2008	(England) Paul Robinson
2009	(England) Andy Frampton
2010	(Republic of Ireland) Alan Dunne
2011	(England) Tamika Mkandawire
2012	(Comoros) Jimmy Abdou
2013	(Nigeria) Danny Shittu
2014	(Republic of Ireland) David Forde
2015	(Comoros) Jimmy Abdou

Year	Winner
2016	(Scotland) Jordan Archer
2017	(Wales) Steve Morison
2018	(England) Shaun Hutchinson
2019	(England) Lee Gregory
2020	(Poland) Bartosz Białkowski
2021	(Poland) Bartosz Białkowski
2022	(Scotland) Murray Wallace
2023	(Netherlands) Zian Flemming
2024	(England) Ryan Leonard
2025	(England) Japhet Tanganga
2026	(England) Jake Cooper

=== Personnel honours ===
==== Football Hall of Fame ====
Millwall players inducted into the (England) English Football Hall of Fame:

- (England) Ray Wilkins (2013)
- (England) Teddy Sheringham (2009)

Millwall players inducted into the (Republic of Ireland) Irish Football Hall of Fame:

- (Republic of Ireland) Tony Cascarino (2015)

Millwall players inducted into the Sport Australia Hall of Fame:

- (Australia) Tim Cahill (2023)

==== PFA Fans' Player of the Year ====
Players included in the PFA Fans' Player of the Year whilst playing for Millwall:

- (England) Jay Simpson (2008, while on loan from Arsenal) (First winner of the award whilst on loan at another club.)

==== PFA Team of the Year ====
Players included in the PFA Team of the Year whilst playing for Millwall:

- (Nigeria) Femi Azeez (2026)
- (France) Tristan Crama (2026)
- (Australia) Tim Cahill (2004)
- (Australia) Tim Cahill (2001)
- (England) Matt Lawrence (2001)
- (England) Neil Harris (2001)
- (Scotland) Alex Rae (1996)
- (Scotland) Alex Rae (1995)
- (Wales) Ben Thatcher (1995)
- (England) Colin Cooper (1993)
- (England) Dave Cusack (1985)
- (England) John Jackson (1980)
- (England) Ray Evans (1976)
- (England) Bryan King (1975)
- (England) Bryan King (1974)

==== EFL Awards ====
Players honoured at the EFL Awards whilst playing for Millwall:

- (Nigeria) Femi Azeez Championship Team of the Season (2026)
- (France) Tristan Crama Championship Team of the Season (2026)
- (England) Billy Mitchell PFA Player in the Community (2022)
- (England) Millwall F.C. Family Club of the Year (2017)
- (Nigeria) Danny Shittu PFA Player in the Community (2015)
- (Scotland) Billy Neil Unsung Hero (2013)
- (England) Tamika Mkandawire PFA Player in the Community (2012)

=== Notable former players ===
The following is a list of notable footballers who have played for Millwall, including players who have been honoured in Millwall's Hall of Fame, international players who were capped by their country while playing for Millwall, players who have been given a testimonial for 10 years of service at the club, players who have made over 100 appearances or scored 50 goals, and also 1885 founder member players who contributed significantly to the clubs' history.

Algeria

- (Algeria) Hamer Bouazza

Antigua and Barbuda

- (Antigua and Barbuda) Mahlon Romeo

Australia

- (Australia) Tim Cahill
- (Australia) James Meredith
- (Australia) Dave Mitchell
- (Australia) Kevin Muscat
- (Australia) Lucas Neill
- (Australia) Jason van Blerk

Barbados

- (Barbados) Michael Gilkes
- (Barbados) Paul Ifill

Canada

- (Canada) Marc Bircham
- (Canada) Adrian Serioux
- (Canada) Josh Simpson
- (Canada) Kris Twardek

Comoros

- (Comoros) Jimmy Abdou

Czech Republic

- (Czech Republic) Jiří Skalák

England

- (England) Gary Alexander
- (England) Sam Allardyce
- (England) Chris Armstrong
- (England) Herbert Banks
- (England) Mark Beard
- (England) Gordon Bolland
- (England) Ray Brand
- (England) Les Briley
- (England) Joe Broadfoot
- (England) Peter Burridge
- (England) John Calvey
- (England) Jimmy Carter
- (England) Nick Chatterton
- (England) Steve Claridge
- (England) Jack Cock
- (England) Jimmy Constantine
- (England) Colin Cooper
- (England) Tony Craig
- (England) Harry Cripps
- (England) Ian Dawes

- (England) Danny Dichio
- (England) Alan Dorney
- (England) Marvin Elliott
- (England) John Fashanu
- (England) George Fisher
- (England) Jack Fort
- (England) Freddie Fox
- (England) Paul Goddard
- (England) Len Graham
- (England) Lee Gregory
- (England) Neil Harris
- (England) Brian Horne
- (England) Gordon Hill
- (England) Richard Hill
- (England) Terry Hurlock
- (England) Shaun Hutchinson
- (England) Johnny Johnson
- (England) Len Julians
- (England) Harry Kane
- (England) Bryan King
- (England) Barry Kitchener
- (England) Matt Lawrence
- (England) David Livermore
- (England) Dave Mangnall
- (England) Alan McLeary
- (England) Stuart Nethercott
- (England) Derek Possee
- (England) Andy Roberts
- (England) Henry Roberts
- (England) Paul Robinson
- (England) Barry Rowan
- (England) Neil Ruddock
- (England) John Seasman
- (England) Paul Shaw
- (England) Teddy Sheringham
- (England) Reg Smith
- (England) Alex Stepney
- (England) Keith Stevens
- (England) John Willie Sutcliffe
- (England) Tony Towner
- (England) Alf Twigg
- (England) Phil Walker
- (England) Jed Wallace
- (England) Darren Ward
- (England) Keith Weller
- (England) Dennis Wise
- (England) Tony Witter
- (England) Steve Wood

Iceland

- (Iceland) Jón Daði Böðvarsson

Jamaica

- (Jamaica) Shaun Cummings
- (Jamaica) Barry Hayles

Montenegro

- (Montenegro) Matija Šarkić

New Zealand

- (New Zealand) Chris Wood

Nigeria

- (Nigeria) Danny Shittu

Northern Ireland

- (Northern Ireland) Daniel Ballard
- (Northern Ireland) Tom Brolly
- (Northern Ireland) Shane Ferguson
- (Northern Ireland) Bryan Hamilton
- (Northern Ireland) Ted Hinton
- (Northern Ireland) Chris McGrath
- (Northern Ireland) Billy McCullough
- (Northern Ireland) Conor McLaughlin
- (Northern Ireland) Josh McQuoid
- (Northern Ireland) Anton Rogan
- (Northern Ireland) George Saville
- (Northern Ireland) Ian Stewart

Republic of Ireland

- (Republic of Ireland) Keith Branagan
- (Republic of Ireland) John Byrne
- (Republic of Ireland) Tony Cascarino
- (Republic of Ireland) Kenny Cunningham
- (Republic of Ireland) Alan Dunne
- (Republic of Ireland) Eamon Dunphy
- (Republic of Ireland) David Forde
- (Republic of Ireland) Jon Goodman
- (Republic of Ireland) Joe Haverty
- (Republic of Ireland) Charlie Hurley
- (Republic of Ireland) Mark Kennedy
- (Republic of Ireland) Andy Keogh
- (Republic of Ireland) Mick McCarthy
- (Republic of Ireland) Aiden O'Brien
- (Republic of Ireland) Kevin O'Callaghan
- (Republic of Ireland) Steven Reid
- (Republic of Ireland) Robbie Ryan
- (Republic of Ireland) Richard Sadlier
- (Republic of Ireland) Dave Savage
- (Republic of Ireland) Pat Saward
- (Republic of Ireland) Gary Waddock
- (Republic of Ireland) Shaun Williams

Saint Kitts and Nevis

- (Saint Kitts and Nevis) Bobby Bowry

Russia

- (Russia) Sergei Yuran

Scotland

- (Scotland) Jordan Archer
- (Scotland) Willie Carr
- (Scotland) Stevie Crawford
- (Scotland) Hugh Curran
- (Scotland) Jimmy Forsyth
- (Scotland) Malcolm Finlayson
- (Scotland) John Gilchrist
- (Scotland) Paul Hartley
- (Scotland) Duncan Hean
- (Scotland) Alex Jardine
- (Scotland) John McGinlay
- (Scotland) Alex Rae
- (Scotland) Murray Wallace

Trinidad & Tobago

- (Trinidad and Tobago) Carlos Edwards
- (Trinidad and Tobago) Justin Hoyte
- (Trinidad and Tobago) Tony Warner

United States of America

- (United States) Kasey Keller
- (United States) John Kerr
- (United States) Bruce Murray
- (United States) Zak Whitbread

Wales

- (Wales) Malcolm Allen
- (Wales) Tom Bradshaw
- (Wales) Joe Davies
- (Wales) Walter Davis
- (Wales) Jermaine Easter
- (Wales) Paul Jones
- (Wales) Dick Jones
- (Wales) Steve Lovell
- (Wales) Steve Lowndes
- (Wales) John Lyons
- (Wales) Steve Morison
- (Wales) Ben Thatcher
- (Wales) Alf Watkins

== Managers ==
Since the appointment of the club's first professional manager, Bert Lipsham on 4 May 1911, there have been 50 individual managers (including 34 permanent and 17 caretaker managers), across 53 management spells. From 1890 to 1910, Millwall directors Kidd, Stopher, and Saunders were honorary managers, also working under the title of club secretary. Bob Hunter is Millwall's longest serving manager, having stayed at the helm for 15 years. He died in office in 1933, having served at the club for a total of 36 years. Steve Claridge holds the shortest tenure at the club, having been in charge for a period of 36 days without ever taking charge of a first-team game. 7 managers have held the position of manager multiple times, with club top goal scorer Neil Harris the only manager to hold the position on 3 separate occasions. Every Millwall manager has come from the United Kingdom or Ireland.

(S) = Secretary, (C) = Caretaker, (2) Second Spell, (3) Third Spell

Years	Manager
1890–1899	(England) Fred Kidd^{(S)}
1899–1900	(England) Edward Stopher^{(S)}
1900–1910	(England) George Saunders^{(S)}
1911–1918	(England) Bert Lipsham
1918–1933	(Scotland) Bob Hunter
1933–1936	(Northern Ireland) Bill McCracken
1936–1940	(England) Charlie Hewitt
1940–1944	(England) William Voisey
1944–1948	(England) Jack Cock
1948–1956	(England) Charlie Hewitt^{(2)}
1956–1958	(England) Ron Gray
1958–1959	(England) Jimmy Seed
1959–1961	(England) Reg 'J.R.' Smith
1961–1963	(England) Ron Gray^{(2)}
1963–1966	(England) Billy Gray
1966–1974	(England) Benny Fenton
1974	(Republic of Ireland) Theo Foley^{(C)}
1974–1977	(England) Gordon Jago
1977	(Republic of Ireland) Theo Foley^{(C)(2)}
1978–1980	(England) George Petchey
1980	(England) Terry Long^{(C)}
1980–1982	(England) Peter Anderson
1982	(England) Barry Kitchener^{(C)}

Years	Manager
1982–1986	(Scotland) George Graham
1986–1990	(Scotland) John Docherty
1990	(England) Bob Pearson^{(C)}
1990–1992	(Scotland) Bruce Rioch
1992–1996	(Republic of Ireland) Mick McCarthy
1996	(Wales) Ian Evans^{(C)}
1996–1997	(Northern Ireland) Jimmy Nicholl
1997	(Scotland) John Docherty
1997–1998	(England) Billy Bonds
1998–1999	(England) Keith Stevens
1999–2000	(England) Keith Stevens & Alan McLeary
2000	(England) Steve Gritt^{(C)} & Ray Harford^{(C)}
2000–2003	(Scotland) Mark McGhee
2003–2005	(England) Dennis Wise
2005	(England) Steve Claridge
2005–2006	(England) Colin Lee
2006	(England) Dave Tuttle
2006	(England) Tony Burns^{(C)} & Alan McLeary^{(C)(2)}
2006	(England) Nigel Spackman
2006–2007	(Scotland) Willie Donachie
2007	(England) Richard Shaw^{(C)} & Colin West^{(C)}
2007–2013	(Wales) Kenny Jackett
2013	(Northern Ireland) Steve Lomas

Years	Manager
2013–2014	(England) Neil Harris^{(C)} & Scott Fitzgerald^{(C)}
2014–2015	(England) Ian Holloway
2015–2019	(England) Neil Harris^{(2)}
2019	(England) Adam Barrett^{(C)}
2019–2023	(England) Gary Rowett
2023	(England) Adam Barrett^{(C)(2)}
2023–2024	(England) Joe Edwards
2024	(England) Neil Harris^{(3)}
2024	(England) David Livermore^{(C)}
2024–	(Scotland) Alex Neil

=== Top 10 managers by games managed ===
As of match played 14 December 2024

Top 10 managers by games managed
Rank	Years	Manager	Games
1	1918–1933	(Scotland) Bob Hunter	571
2	1936–1940, 1948–1956	(England) Charlie Hewitt	509
3	1966–1974	(England) Benny Fenton	392
4	2007–2013	(Wales) Kenny Jackett	306
5	2013–2014, 2015–2019, 2024	(England) Neil Harris	283
6	1992–1996	(Republic of Ireland) Mick McCarthy	207
7	1982–1986	(Scotland) George Graham	201
8	1986–1990, 1997	(Scotland) John Docherty	198
9	2019–2023	(England) Gary Rowett	196
10	2000–2003	(Scotland) Mark McGhee	164

== Club officials ==
As of 03 August 2025.

=== Board ===
- Chairman: James Berylson
- Directors: Constantine Gonticas, Trevor Keyse, Richard Press, Peter Garston and Matthew Sidman
- Managing Director: Mark Fairbrother
- Chief Financial Officier: Emma Parker
- Chief Commercial Officer: Luke Wilson
- Director of Football: Steve Gallen

=== Coaching staff ===
- Head Coach: Alex Neil
- Assistant Head Coach: Martin Canning
- First Team Coach: David Livermore
- Goalkeeping Coach: Dean Thornton
- U21 Elite Development Squad Manager: Kevin Nugent
- U21 Elite Development Squad Assistant Manager: Paul Robinson
- Academy Director: Scott Fitzgerald

== Honours ==
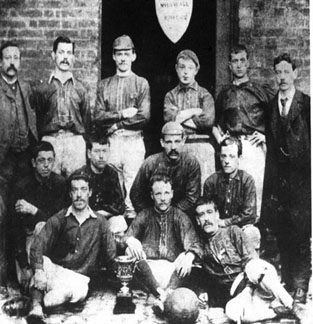
Millwall Rovers with the East London Cup, 1887.

League

- Second Division / First Division (level 2)
  - Champions: 1987–88
- Third Division South / Third Division / Second Division / League One (level 3)
  - Champions: 1927–28, 1937–38, 2000–01
  - Promoted: 1965–66, 1975–76, 1984–85
  - Play-off winners: 2010, 2017
- Fourth Division (level 4)
  - Champions: 1961–62
  - Runners-up: 1964–65
- Western Football League
  - Champions: 1907–08, 1908–09
- Southern Football League
  - Champions: 1894–95, 1895–96

Cup

- FA Cup
  - Runners-up: 2003–04
- Football League Trophy
  - Winners: 1982–83
  - Runners-up: 1998–99
- Football League War Cup
  - Finalists: 1945
- Third Division South Cup
  - Winners: 1937

Minor

- London League
  - Champions: 1903–04
- United League
  - Champions: 1896–97, 1898–99
- Kent Senior Shield
  - Winners: 1912, 1913
- London Challenge Cup
  - Winners: 1909, 1915, 1928, 1938
- East London Senior Cup
  - Winners: 1887, 1888, 1889
- East London FA Cup
  - Joint-winners: 1886
- Southern Professional Charity Cup
  - Winners: 1904
  - Finalists: 1903
- London Charity Cup
  - Finalists: 1892

== Records and statistics ==
Barry Kitchener holds the record for Millwall appearances, having played 596 matches between 1966 and 1982. The goalscoring record is held by former manager Neil Harris, with 138 in all competitions. He broke the previous record of 111 goals, held by Teddy Sheringham on 13 January 2009, during a 3–2 away win at Crewe Alexandra. The club's widest victory margin in the league is 9–1, a scoreline which they achieved twice in their Football League Third Division South championship-winning year of 1927. They beat both Torquay United and Coventry City by this score at The Den. Millwall's heaviest league defeat was 8–1 away to Plymouth Argyle in 1932. The club's heaviest loss in all competitions was a 9–1 defeat at Aston Villa in an FA Cup fourth-round second-leg in 1946. Millwall's largest Cup win was 7–0 over Gateshead in 1936. Their highest scoring aggregate game was a 12-goal thriller at home to Preston North End in 1930 when Millwall lost 7–5.

=== Player records ===
As of 14 May 2026
Appearances

**Position**	**Years**	**Player**	**Appearances**
1	1966–82	(England) Barry Kitchener	596
2	1980–99	(England) Keith Stevens	557
3	1961–74	(England) Harry Cripps	443
4	2017–	(England) **Jake Cooper**	435
5	1998–04, 2007–11	(England) Neil Harris	431
6	1981–93, 1997–99	(England) Alan McLeary	413
7	2000–2015	(Republic of Ireland) Alan Dunne	387
8	2001–2015	(England) Paul Robinson	361
9	1929–39	(Scotland) Jimmy Forsyth	343
9	2008–2018	(Comoros) Jimmy Abdou	343

Goals

**Position**	**Years**	**Player**	**Goals**
1	1998–04, 2007–11	(England) Neil Harris	138
2	1982–91	(England) Teddy Sheringham	111
3	2009–11, 2013–14, 2015–19	(Wales) Steve Morison	92
4	1967–73	(England) Derek Possee	87
5	1927–31	(England) Jack Cock	83
6	1948–52	(England) Jimmy Constantine	80
7	1952–58	(England) Johnny Shepherd	78
8	2014–19	(England) Lee Gregory	77
9	1959–64	(England) David Jones	74
10	1925–33	(England) Jack Landells	71
10	1990–96	(Scotland) Alex Rae	71

- Players in **bold** denotes still playing for the club.
- Only Football League and senior cup competitions included.

See List of Millwall F.C. seasons for Millwall's top goalscorer each year since 1895.

== Millwall in European football ==
On 22 May 2004 Millwall played Manchester United in the FA Cup Final, losing 3–0. As United had already qualified for the UEFA Champions League, Millwall were assured of playing in the UEFA Cup. Millwall played in the first round proper and lost 4–2 on aggregate to Ferencváros.

=== European record ===
Season	Competition	Round	Opponents	1st leg	2nd leg	Aggregate
2004–05	UEFA Cup	First round	(Hungary) Ferencváros	1–1	1–3	2–4

== Supporters and hooliganism ==
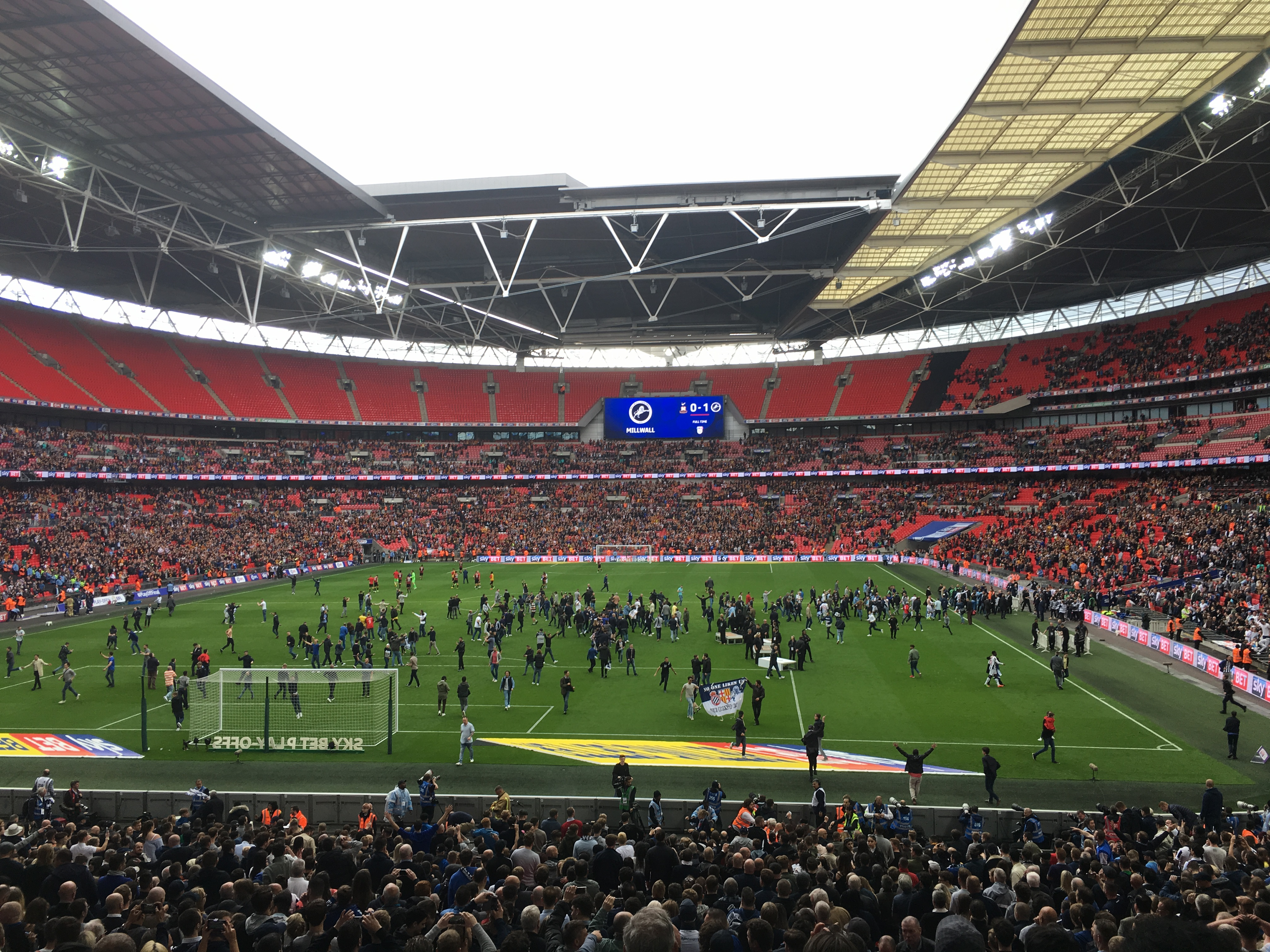
The first pitch invasion at the new Wembley by Millwall fans, May 2017.

"No one likes us, we don't care"
The infamous terrace chant of Millwall supporters – No one likes us, we don't care.

Millwall have averaged a gate close to 12,000 per home game over their 93 seasons in the Football League, while the club have spent the majority of that time yo-yoing back and forth between the second and third tiers of English football. Originally based in the East End of London, the club moved across the River Thames in 1910 to south east London and support is drawn from the surrounding areas. The club and fans have a historic association with football hooliganism, which came to prevalence in the 1970s and 1980s with a firm known originally as F-Troop, eventually becoming more widely known as the Millwall Bushwackers, who were one of the most notorious hooligan gangs in England. On five occasions The Den was closed by The FA and the club has received numerous fines for crowd disorder. The BBC documentary Panorama was invited into the club by Millwall in 1977 to show the hooligan reputation was a myth and being blown out of proportion by reporting. Instead the BBC portrayed hooliganism as being deeply rooted in Millwall, and linked them to the far-right political party National Front. The show was extremely damaging for the club. Former club chairman Reg Burr once commented: "Millwall are a convenient coat peg for football to hang its social ills on", an example being the reporting of convicted murderer Gavin Grant. Although he had played for eight different clubs, playing his fewest games (four) for Millwall, and was signed to Bradford City at the time, the BBC used the headline, "Former Millwall striker Gavin Grant guilty of murder".

The stigma of violence attached to Millwall can be traced back over 100 years. Millwall played local rivals West Ham United away at Upton Park on 17 September 1906 in a Western League game. Both sets of supporters were primarily made up of dockers, who lived and worked in the same locality in east London. Many were rivals working for opposing firms and vying for the same business. A local newspaper, East Ham Echo, reported that, "From the very first kick of the ball it was seen likely to be some trouble, but the storm burst when Dean and Jarvis came into collision (Millwall had two players sent off during the match). This aroused considerable excitement among the spectators. The crowds on the bank having caught the fever, free fights were plentiful." In the 1920s Millwall's ground was closed for two weeks after a Newport County goalkeeper, who had been struck by missiles, jumped into the crowd to confront some of the home supporters and was knocked unconscious. The ground was again closed for two weeks in 1934 following crowd disturbances after the visit of Bradford Park Avenue. Pitch invasions resulted in another closure in 1947 and in 1950 the club was fined after a referee and linesman were ambushed outside the ground.

In the 1960s, hooliganism in England became more widely reported. On 6 November 1965 Millwall beat west London club Brentford 2–1 away at Griffin Park and during the game a hand grenade was thrown onto the pitch from the Millwall end. Brentford's goalkeeper Chic Brodie picked it up, inspected it and threw it into his goal. It was later retrieved by police and determined to be a harmless dummy. There was fighting inside and outside the ground during the game between both sets of supporters, with one Millwall fan sustaining a broken jaw. The Sun newspaper ran the sensationalist grenade-related headline "Soccer Marches to War!" Trouble was reported at Loftus Road on 26 March 1966 during a match between Queens Park Rangers and Millwall, at a time when both sides were near the top of the league table pushing for promotion to Division Two, but the London derby was won 6–1 by the west London based team QPR. In the second-half, a coin was thrown from the terraces, which struck Millwall player Len Julians on the head, drawing blood. The stadium announcer warned that the game would be abandoned if there were any more disturbances from the crowd, prompting some Millwall fans to invade the pitch in an unsuccessful attempt to get the game abandoned. When Millwall's unbeaten home record of 59 games came to an end against Plymouth Argyle in 1967, the windows of the away team's coach were smashed. In the same year, a referee was attacked and the FA ordered the club to erect fences around The Den's terracing. On 11 March 1978 a riot broke out at The Den during an FA Cup quarter-final between Millwall and Ipswich Town, with the home team losing 6–1. Fighting began on the terraces and spilled onto the pitch; dozens of fans were injured, with some hooligans turning on their own team's supporters leaving some innocent fans bloodied. Bobby Robson, then manager of Ipswich, said of Millwall fans afterward, "They [the police] should have turned the flamethrowers on them". In 1982 Millwall club chairman Alan Thorne threatened to close the club because of violence sparked by losing in the FA Cup to non-league side Slough Town.

The 1985 Kenilworth Road riot, after an FA Cup sixth-round match between Luton Town and Millwall on 13 March 1985, became one of the worst and widely reported incidents of football hooliganism to date. On that night, approximately 20,000 people packed into a ground that usually only held half that number to watch Luton beat Millwall 1–0. Numerous pitch invasions, fighting in the stands and missile-throwing occurred, of which one such object hit Luton's goalkeeper Les Sealey. It led to a ban on away supporters by Luton from their Kenilworth Road ground for four years. Luton were asked by Millwall to make the Wednesday night match all-ticket, but this was ignored. As a result, rival hooligan firms gained access to the stadium. As well as the Millwall hooligans and those belonging to Luton's firm the MIGs, many of the 31 fans arrested after the violence were identified as being from Chelsea's Headhunters firm and West Ham United's Inter City Firm. The FA commissioned an inquiry which concluded that it was "not satisfied that Millwall F.C. took all reasonable precautions in accordance with the requirements of FA Rule 31(A)(II)." A £7,500 fine was levied against Millwall, though this was later withdrawn on appeal. The penalty that Millwall faced was perhaps that the club's name was now "synonymous with everything that was bad in football and society".

In May 2002, hundreds of hooligans attaching themselves to Millwall were involved in disorder around the ground, after the team lost a play-off game to Birmingham City. It was described by the BBC as one of the worst cases of civil disorder seen in Great Britain in recent times. A police spokeswoman said that 47 police officers and 24 police horses were injured, and the Metropolitan Police considered suing the club after the events. The then chairman Theo Paphitis responded that Millwall could not be blamed for the actions of a mindless minority who attach themselves to the club. "The problem of mob violence is not solely a Millwall problem, it is not a football problem, it is a problem which plagues the whole of our society", he said. Paphitis later introduced a membership scheme whereby only fans who would be prepared to join and carry membership cards would be allowed into The Den. Scotland Yard withdrew its threat to sue, stating: "In light of the efforts made and a donation to a charity helping injured police officers, the Metropolitan Police Service has decided not to pursue legal action against Millwall F.C. in relation to the disorder". Some legal experts said it would have been difficult to hold a football club responsible for something that occurred away from its ground and involved people who did not attend the match. The scheme introduced by Paphitis now only applies to perceived high-risk away games. Many fans blame the scheme for diminishing Millwall's away support, such as at Leeds United where fans are issued with vouchers which are then exchanged for tickets at a designated point of West Yorkshire Police's choosing on the day of the game. Also, early kick-off times arranged by the police often result in only a few hundred fans making the trip.

Millwall supporters celebrate Shane Lowry's 35-yard freekick against Charlton Athletic at The Valley on 16 March 2013

In January 2009, hundreds of Millwall fans perceived as "high risk" individuals gained access to an FA Cup fourth-round match away at Hull City. The game, won 2–0 by Hull, was overshadowed when seats, coins and plastic bottles were thrown by some away supporters. There were conflicting reports in the media as to whether missiles were initially thrown by Hull supporters following chanting and jeering by Millwall fans of Jimmy Bullard (an ex-West Ham player) just prior to the fixture. On 25 August 2009, Millwall played away at West Ham United in the Football League Cup, losing 3–1 after extra time. One Millwall supporter was stabbed during clashes between the two sets of fans outside the ground. The game saw hundreds of West Ham fans invade the pitch on three occasions, forcing the game to be temporarily suspended once. The police later said the violence, because of its scale, was organised beforehand. In the aftermath of the disorder, Millwall were handed three charges by the FA and later cleared of all of them; West Ham received four charges and were found guilty on two counts: violent, threatening, obscene and provocative behaviour, and entering the field of play. West Ham were fined £115,000, an amount seen as an insult by Millwall, which staunchly defended the actions of its own fans and the club's inability to do any more than it had for a match at a rival's ground.

After a game against Queens Park Rangers at Loftus Road in September 2010, manager Kenny Jackett said Millwall's hooligan problems are to a certain extent exaggerated by media sensationalism. "I see it as unjust. We are an easy club to criticise and in my time [at the club], the way we have been reported is unfair", he said. Other examples of this include archive footage of their hooligan element's past bad behaviour being shown, when disorder has occurred at other grounds, not involving them. During a game between Millwall and Huddersfield Town, The Observer reported that a Huddersfield Town fan had thrown a coin at a linesman, and that some Millwall fans had intervened, and handed the culprit over to police. The News of the World, however, bore the headline: "Millwall Thugs Deck Linesman With Concrete". This has led to a siege mentality among supporters of the club, which gave rise to the Millwall fans' famous terrace chant, No one likes us, we don't care, being sung in defiant defence of themselves and their team. In April 2013, Millwall met Wigan Athletic in a semi-final of the FA Cup. Millwall lost the game 2–0. Towards the end of the match, violence broke out in part of the stand allocated to Millwall, with individuals fighting amongst themselves and then against police, resulting in 14 arrests, of which two were Wigan supporters. In January 2014, a Millwall fan ripped a linesman's flag after a corner was not given to his side during a game against Leicester City; Millwall lost 1–3. On 29 May 2016, Millwall played in the Football League One play-off final against Barnsley at Wembley Stadium, but towards the end of the match, with Barnsley winning 3–1, a group of Millwall supporters broke through a security barrier and attacked Barnsley supporters, some of whom were forced to leave the stadium to avoid the violence. Also there were objects thrown towards the Barnsley players and Barnsley supporters during the game. The fighting and violence was condemned by the Football Association. On 26 January 2019, Millwall beat Everton 3–2 and knocked them out of the FA Cup. The two teams supporters clashed away from The Den before the game, with an Everton fan being slashed across the face with a knife. A senior Metropolitan Police officer said, it was "some of the most shocking football violence seen for some time". The game was also blighted by allegations of racist chanting.

On 5 December 2020, Millwall played against Derby County in the first game back at the Den for fans in ten months due to the COVID-19 pandemic. Some of the 2,000 fans present booed the players who took a knee and raised a fist before the game in support of anti discrimination as outlined in a statement released by the Millwall players before the match. The booing was condemned by The FA, EFL, Kick it Out, and mainstream media. Cabinet minister George Eustice refused to condemn Millwall fans, stating the Black Lives Matter political movement was against what most British people believed in, though said the players should be free to express their views. The leader of the Brexit Party Nigel Farage called BLM a Marxist Party who had been "sussed out" by Millwall fans and called for kneeling to stop. In the next game at the Den against QPR on 8 December 2020, Millwall fans applauded as QPR and Millwall players raised aloft a banner in support of Kick It Out. The 2,000 Millwall fans also applauded just before kick off, when the QPR players took a knee and the Millwall players stayed standing. Before the game, every fan was given a letter from the club saying, "The eyes of the world are on this football club tonight – your club – and they want us to fail. Together as one, we will not let that happen."

== Notable supporters ==
Name	Occupation
Danny Baker	Radio DJ and comedian
Michael Barrymore	Actor
Geoff Bell	Actor
Big Narstie	MC, rapper
Ted Cheeseman	Boxer
CM Punk	WWE wrestler
Bob Crow	Former RMT trade union leader
Daniel Day-Lewis	Actor
Madeline Duggan	Actress
Andy Fordham	Former darts world champion
Lars Frederiksen	Singer in Rancid
Johnny Garton	Boxer
Steve Harley	Singer in Cockney Rebel
Frank Harper	Actor
Blake Harrison	Actor
Tamer Hassan	Actor
David Haye	Retired boxing world champion
Rod Liddle	Journalist
Lord Ouseley	Kick It Out Founder
Nick Love	Film director
Kellie Maloney	Former boxing promoter, born Frank Maloney
Roland Manookian	Actor
Louie McCarthy-Scarsbrook	Rugby player
Laila Morse	Actress
Patrick Murray	Actor, Mickey Pearce in Only Fools and Horses
Des O'Connor	Entertainer
Gary Oldman	Actor
Theo Paphitis	Entrepreneur, Dragons' Den
Scroobius Pip	Musician
Timo Soini	Politician
Gregg Wallace	MasterChef presenter
Denzel Washington	Actor
Ian Wright	Former footballer
Zerkaa	YouTuber

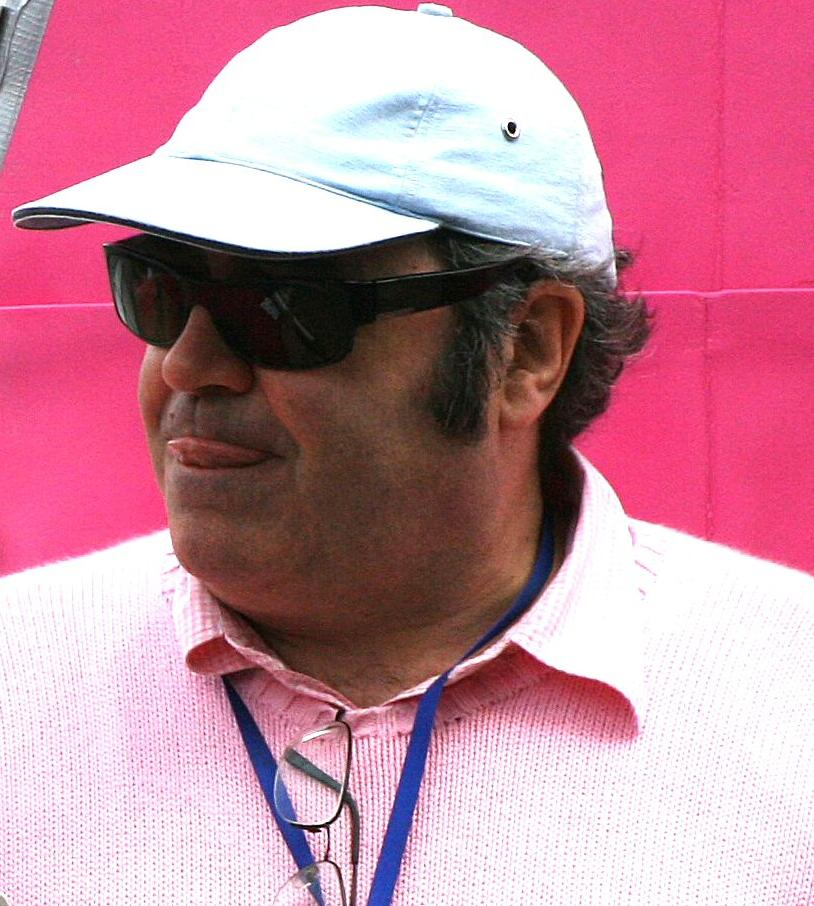
Danny Baker

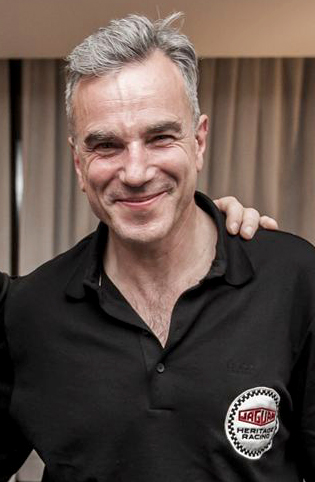
Daniel Day-Lewis

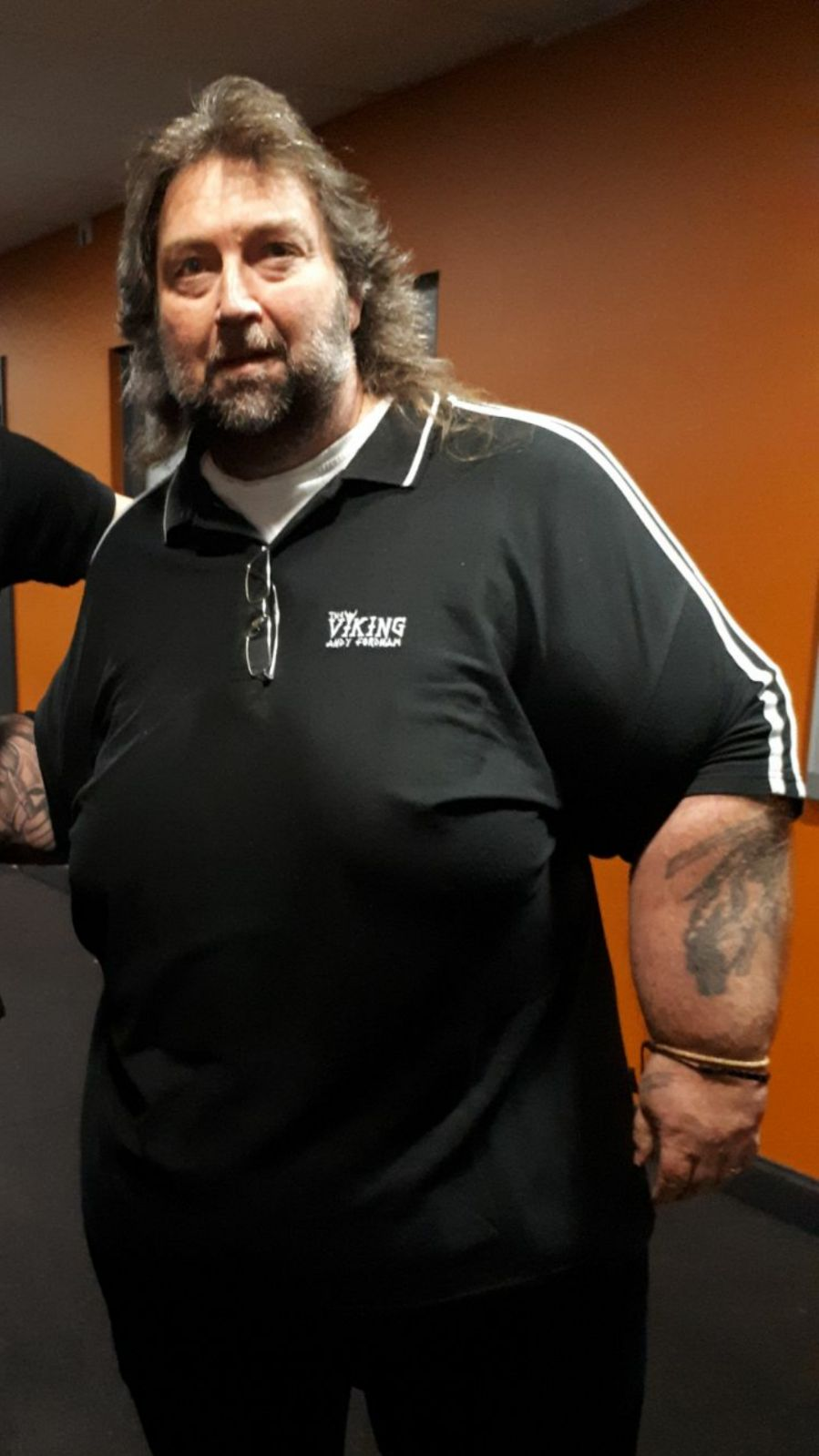
Andy Fordham

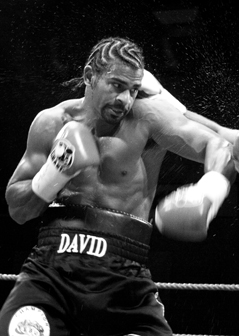
David Haye

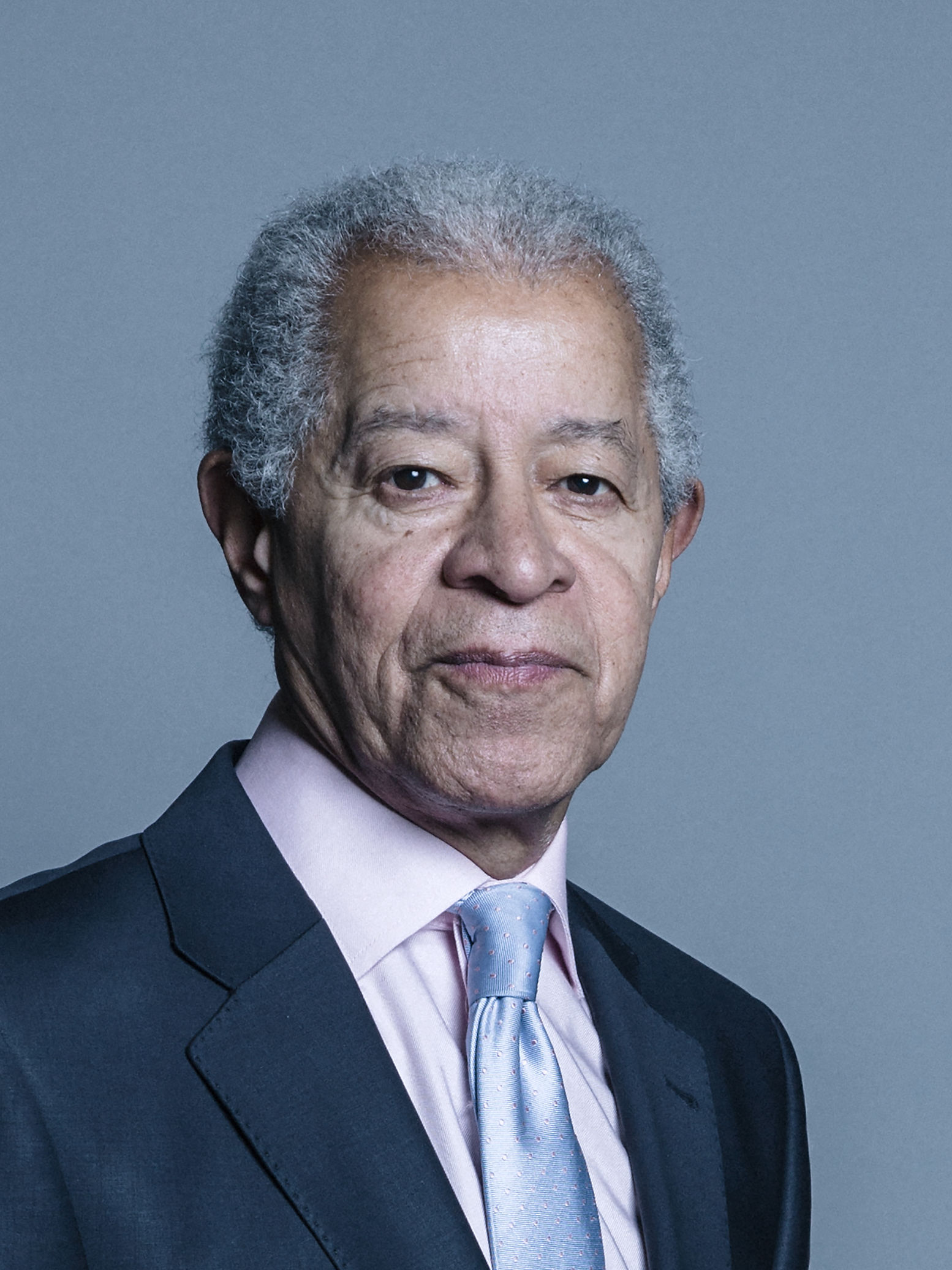
Lord Ouseley

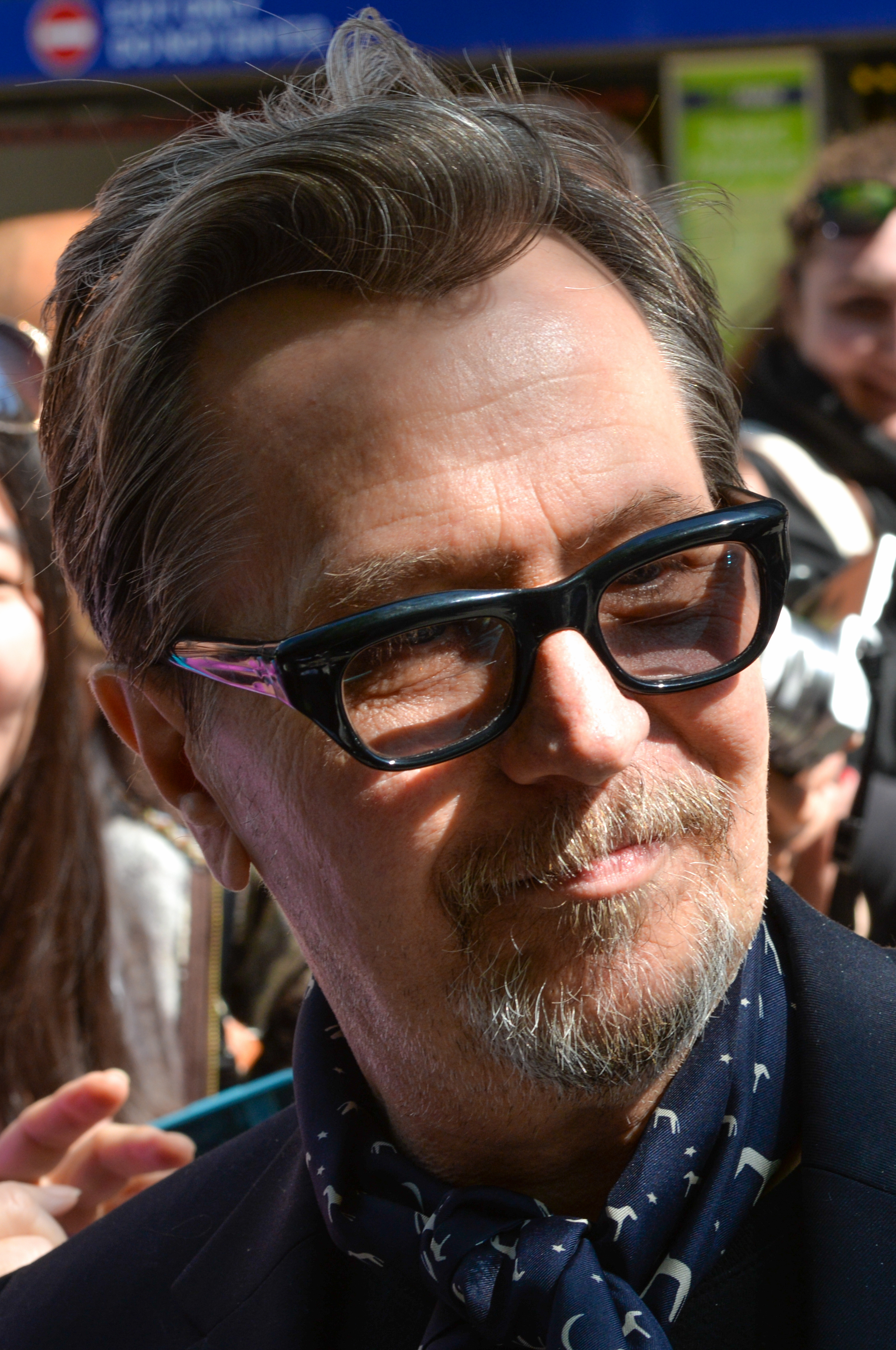
Gary Oldman

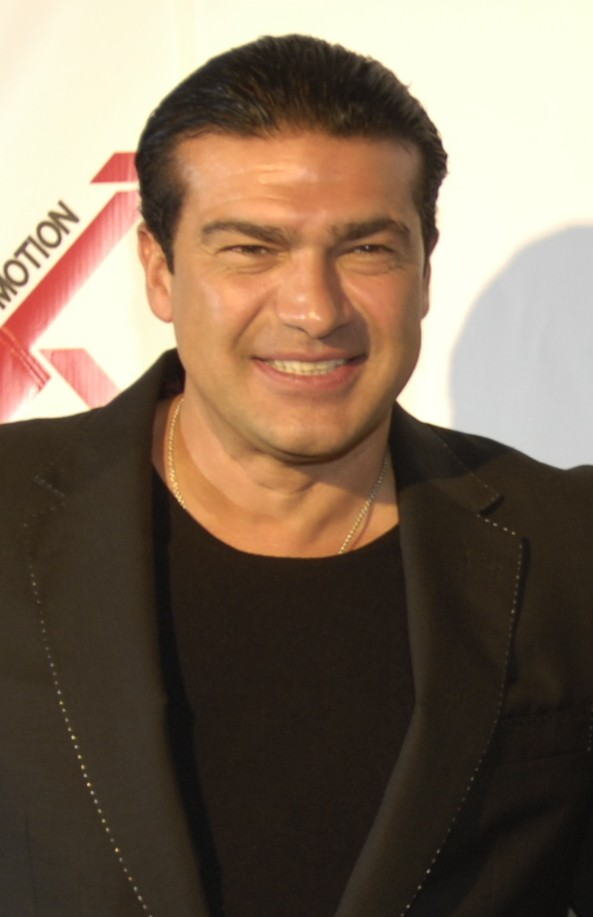
Tamer Hassan

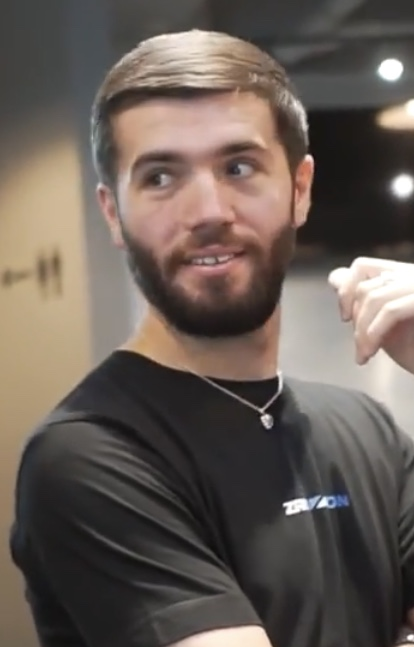
Zerkaa

== In the community ==
In 1985, the club founded the Millwall Community Trust (MCT), which offers sporting, educational and charitable projects. The Trust is based next door to The Den, in the Lions Centre. Working with local people from the surrounding boroughs of Lewisham, Southwark and the wider Millwall Community. The Trust offers sports and fitness programmes, educational workshops, disability activities and soccer schools. The club helps promote anti-knife and anti-gun crime. In a match against Charlton Athletic in 2009, both teams wore special kits for the match in honour of murdered local teenagers and supporters Jimmy Mizen and Rob Knox. The logos of both clubs' shirt sponsors were replaced by the text, "Street violence ruins lives". The club has also helped raise over £10,000 for the charity Help for Heroes.

== In popular culture ==
Millwall have been depicted in films several times, specifically highlighting the club's hooliganism firm the Bushwackers and the rivalry with West Ham United. Often glorifying football violence in the beginning, each film typically ends in loss of life, showing the futility of hooliganism.

- The Firm (1989) – Real life Millwall supporter Gary Oldman plays Bex, leader of football firm the Inter City Crew, a fictional representation of West Ham's Inter City Firm and their violent exploits. Millwall's Bushwackers firm are called The Buccaneers in the film.
- Arrivederci Millwall (1990) – A group of Millwall supporters travel to the 1982 World Cup in Spain, just after the Falklands War breaks out, intent on avenging a personal loss.
- Black Books (2000) – In the first episode "Cooking the Books", Bernard Black (Dylan Moran) attempts to antagonise some Millwall hooligans into injuring him severely enough so that he may avoid doing his taxes. Upon remarking, "Do you know this chant? Millwall, Millwall, you're all really dreadful and all your girlfriends are unfulfilled and alienated," he succeeds.
- The Football Factory (2004) – Primarily about the Chelsea Headhunters, who fight numerous other firms on away days, culminating in a big fight against Millwall's Bushwackers.
- Green Street (2005) – Elijah Wood plays an American student who gets involved with West Ham's firm. The film builds up to a big clash with Millwall's firm at the climax, after the two teams are drawn against each other in the Cup, foreshadowing similarities to the 2009 Upton Park riot.
- Rise of the Footsoldier (2007) – The rise of a football hooligan is chronicled from his beginnings on the terraces to becoming a member of a notorious gang of criminals. The rivalry between West Ham and Millwall is portrayed during the opening scenes of the film.
- Dhan Dhana Dhan Goal (2007) – The main protagonist Sunny Bhasin (John Abraham) initially agrees to leave Southhall United Football Club and signs a lucrative offer to play for Millwall F.C. He later decides not to play for Millwall though.
- Green Street 2: Stand Your Ground (2009) – A direct-to-video sequel to Green Street. It follows on directly from the original's climax, with several members of West Ham's and Millwall's firms ending up in prison together and arranging a football match.
- The Firm (2009) – A remake by Nick Love, director of The Football Factory and himself a Millwall supporter. Set in the 1980s, the film focuses on the music, fashion and culture surrounding football at the time. It was generally well received by critics. In October 2009, the Metropolitan Police released still photos from the film in relation to a search for hooligans from the Upton Park riot. The mistake led to an apology from Scotland Yard.
- St George's Day (2012) – A British gangster film which featured cameos from Millwall players Liam Trotter, Alan Dunne, David Forde, Darren Ward and Scott Barron. The film also included several Millwall references such as 'No One Likes Us' and 'We Fear No Foe'.

The club's ground The Den doubled as The Dragons Lair, home ground of fictional team Harchester United in the television series Dream Team. It also appeared in episodes of the shows The Bill and Primeval. In literature, books such as "No One Likes Us, We Don't Care: True Stories from Millwall, Britain's Most Notorious Football Hooligans" by Andrew Woods focuses on the hooligan element of Millwall. Sunday Mirror columnist Michael Calvin spent the 2009–10 season covering Millwall, writing the book Family: Life, Death and Football. The book looks at the rivalry with West Ham United, the stabbing of a Millwall supporter and the Lions play-off success and promotion to The Championship under Kenny Jackett.

== See also ==
- Millwall Lionesses L.F.C.
