= Barry Kitchener =

English footballer

Personal information
- Full name: Barry Raymond Kitchener
- Date of birth: 11 December 1947
- Place of birth: Dagenham, England
- Date of death: 30 March 2012 (aged 64)
- Height: 6 ft 1 1/2 in (1.87 m)
- Position: Centre-back

Senior career*
Years	Team	Apps	(Gls)
1966–1982	Millwall	523	(25)
1979	→ Tampa Bay Rowdies (loan)	20	(0)
Total		622	(25)
- * Club domestic league appearances and goals

Barry Raymond Kitchener (11 December 1947 – 30 March 2012) was an English professional footballer who played as a centre-back for Millwall between 1966 and 1982.

Born in Dagenham, Essex, Kitchener signed for Millwall in August 1965 and made his Millwall debut in February 1967 at left back, against Birmingham City replacing the injured Harry Cripps. In his next game Kitchener scored against Sheffield United, hitting a 30-yard screamer past former England goalkeeper Alan Hodgkinson. On the return of Cripps to the side, he played in every game that season at centre half, retaining the number five shirt until his retirement in 1982. His total of 602 appearances remains a club record. He released an autobiographical DVD titled 60 Minutes with Barry Kitchener, and in May 2007 was voted by fans to represent Millwall in the P.F.A. Centenary Hall of Fame.

He played one summer in America on loan to the Tampa Bay Rowdies of the North American Soccer League, wearing the number 22 shirt and making 20 appearances along the way. Tampa Bay went all the way through to league final, before losing to Vancouver, 2–1 in Soccer Bowl '79.

Kitchener died on 30 March 2012. He had recently been diagnosed with cancer. Before Millwall's home game on 7 April 2012 against Hull City, a minute's applause and a service were held. The home side wore a special white kit in memory of Kitchener.

The west stand at The Den is named after him

== See also ==
- List of one-club men
