= Jimmy Forsyth =

Scottish football player, trainer and physiotherapist (1904–1982)

Personal information
- Full name: James Forsyth
- Date of birth: 18 October 1904
- Place of birth: Armadale, Scotland
- Date of death: 1982 (aged 77–78)
- Height: 5 ft 11 in (1.80 m)
- Positions: Left half; inside left

Senior career*
Years	Team	Apps	(Gls)
–	Armadale		
–	Bathgate		
1925	Portsmouth	3	(0)
1928–1929	Gillingham	34	(0)
1929–1943	Millwall	321	(47)

Managerial career
- 1964: Ipswich Town (caretaker)
- * Club domestic league appearances and goals

James Forsyth (18 October 1904 – 1982) was a Scottish football player, trainer and physiotherapist, who made more than 350 appearances in the Football League playing as a left half or inside left for Portsmouth, Gillingham and Millwall. Born in Armadale, West Lothian, he began his playing career in his native Scotland with Armadale and Bathgate, and finally retired from playing in 1943 to become assistant trainer of Millwall. He then became first-team trainer at Ipswich Town, a post he held for 15 years, and was caretaker manager of the club for a brief period in 1964, between the departure of Jackie Milburn and the arrival of Bill McGarry. He retired in 1971 and died in 1982.

== Honours ==
Individual

- Ipswich Town Hall of Fame: Inducted 2012
