= Millwall F.C.–West Ham United F.C. rivalry =

Rivalry between two London football teams

Millwall and West Ham United rivalry
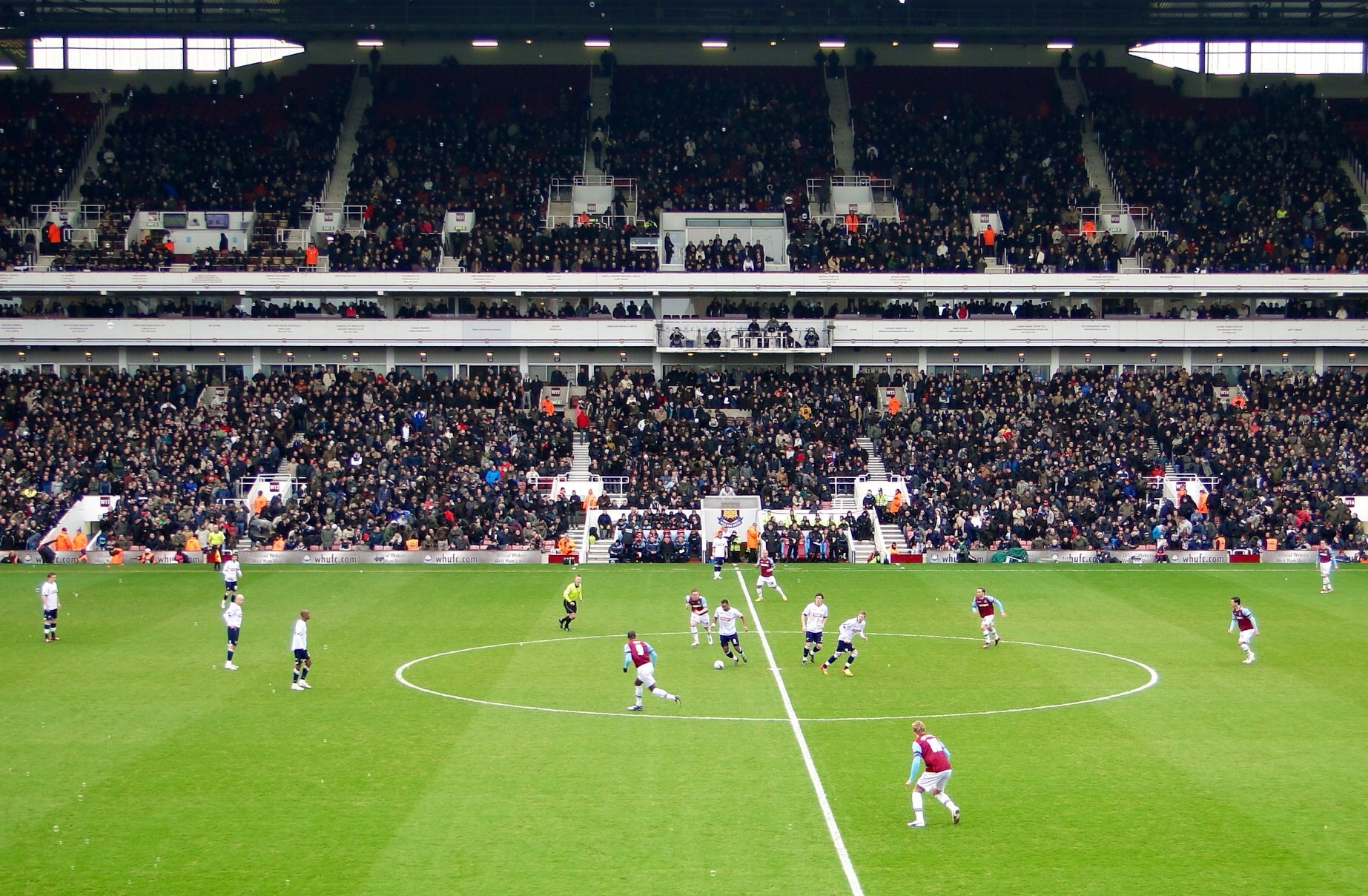
- The last derby held at Upton Park; (4 February 2012)
- Location: London (South and East)
- Teams: Millwall; West Ham United
- First meeting: 9 December 1899; FA Cup; Thames Ironworks 1–2 Millwall Athletic
- Latest meeting: 19 September 2026; EFL Championship; Millwall 2–2 West Ham United
- Next meeting: 21 February 2027; EFL Championship; West Ham United vs Millwall
- Stadiums: The Den (Millwall); London Stadium (West Ham)

Statistics
- Total meetings: 100
- Most wins: Millwall (38)
- Top scorer: Alf Twigg (10)
- All-time series: Millwall: 38; West Ham United: 34; Drawn: 28
- Largest victory: West Ham United 1–7 Millwall Athletic; (2 April 1903)

The football rivalry between Millwall and West Ham United is one of the longest-standing and most intense in English football. Originating in the late 19th century as a derby between rival shipbuilding and dockworking communities in East and South East London, the clubs were originally founded as Millwall Rovers (later Millwall Athletic) in 1885 on the Isle of Dogs, in the East End of London, and Thames Ironworks in 1895 in Canning Town in East London, then part of Essex. The match was historically known as the Dockers Derby, as both sets of supporters were predominantly dockworkers at shipyards on the River Thames. A central element of terrace tradition among West Ham supporters holds that Millwall dockers acted as strike-breakers during historic industrial disputes, a narrative that deeply intensified hostility between the two fanbases alongside competition for river trade.

In 1904, West Ham moved to the Boleyn Ground, more often referred to as Upton Park, which was in Essex until a London boundary change in 1965. In 1910, Millwall moved across the River Thames to New Cross in South East London and the teams were no longer East London neighbours. Both sides have relocated since, but remain just under four miles apart; Millwall moved to The Den in Bermondsey in 1993 and West Ham to the London Stadium in Stratford in 2016.

Millwall and West Ham have played each other 100 times competitively: Millwall have won 38, West Ham 34 and 28 have ended in a draw. Before the First World War, the teams met 60 times in just 16 years, mostly in the Southern and Western Football Leagues. They have played a total of 40 times in league and cup competitions since 1916. The teams have usually competed in different divisions, spending only 13 seasons in the same tier of the Football League. Even so, the derbies have retained their passion and both sets of supporters still consider the other club their main rival. As of the 2026–27 season, Millwall and West Ham both play in the Championship.

The rivalry between the teams is deeply embedded in British football hooliganism lore and culture, and has been depicted in books and films that focus specifically on the animosity between the clubs' two hooligan firms, the Inter City Firm or the Mile End Boys and the Millwall Bushwackers. Violence has occurred sporadically between the fans, resulting in the death of a Millwall supporter in 1976, and the murder of a West Ham fan in 1986. Most recently in the 2009 Upton Park riot, widespread disorder between supporters in and around West Ham's Upton Park ground led to numerous injuries and a Millwall fan being stabbed before the match began. In the last game between the sides in the 2026–27 season, the Metropolitan Police deployed 400 officers and implemented London-wide operations, including a large dispersal order across South London, to ensure the game was trouble-free.

== History of the rivalry ==
=== Founding of the clubs: 1885–98 ===
Millwall and West Ham United, separated by the River Thames, are just under four miles (6.23 km) apart.

Millwall Rovers Football Club was formed in 1885 by tinsmiths at JT Morton's canned food factory on the Isle of Dogs in the East End of London. Ten years later, Thames Ironworks Football Club was formed by Dave Taylor, a foreman at Thames Ironworks and Shipbuilding Company, London's last major shipbuilding firm. Arnold Hills, the company owner, decided to form a football team to improve the morale of his workforce. The two clubs were situated less than three miles (4.8 km) apart.

The earliest meetings between the clubs were reserve games: the first ended in a 6–0 home win for Millwall Athletic Reserves (Note: Millwall Rovers were renamed Millwall Athletic in 1889.) on 14 December 1895 over a newly formed Thames Ironworks side. On 23 September 1897, the two sides played a first-team friendly match at Millwall's Athletic Grounds, Millwall Athletic won 2–0 in front of a crowd of 1,200 spectators.

=== Sixty meetings in sixteen years: 1899–1915 ===
On 9 December 1899 the two teams met for their first competitive fixture – a Fifth Round qualifying match in the FA Cup. Millwall Athletic won 2–1 at Thames Ironworks' Memorial Grounds; their goal scorers were Hugh Goldie and Bert Banks. Millwall reached the 1899–1900 semi-final and lost 3–0 to Southampton, but gained the nickname The Lions from a newspaper headline heralding them as "The Lions of the South" for their cup exploits. The teams' second competitive meeting was a Southern League match that spanned two centuries. A fixture at the Memorial Grounds on 23 December 1899 was abandoned after 69 minutes owing to smog, with Millwall leading 2–0. Instead of replaying the game, the remaining 21 minutes were completed after the return fixture four months later, on 28 April 1900. After Ironworks won 1–0, the players took a short rest and played the rest of the abandoned game. With no further score, Millwall won the game 2–0.

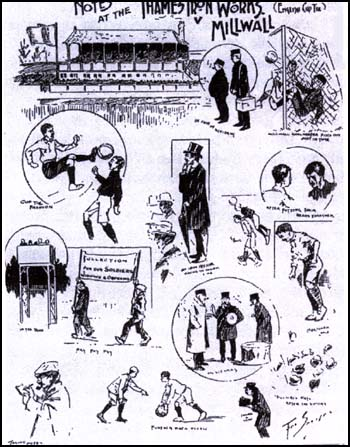
A programme cover from the first competitive game between Thames Ironworks and Millwall Athletic on 9 December 1899.

Thames Ironworks was disbanded in June 1900 owing to disputes over the running of the club. The following month it was relaunched as West Ham United. The club's nickname is The Hammers, owing to their Ironworks origins. In the 1901–02 and 1902–03 seasons, Millwall and West Ham competed in the Southern League, London League, Western League and Southern Professional Charity Cup. The two sides met seven times in each of these seasons, the highest number of meetings in a season between the clubs. During this period Millwall were unbeaten in 12 consecutive games against West Ham, with nine wins and three draws over two years. This included a 7–1 win in a Southern Professional Charity Cup semi-final on 2 April 1903, the largest winning margin between the teams. Ben Hulse scored four of the goals at the Memorial Grounds. The run was finally broken on 1 September 1904, in a 3–0 victory at West Ham's first ever game at Upton Park, with two goals from Billy Bridgeman and one by Jack Flynn. Upton Park was in Essex until 1965, and technically West Ham was not a London team again until an act of Parliament changed the boundary lines of London in 1965 and the Borough of Newham was formed.

On 17 September 1906, in a Western League game, Millwall player Alf Dean was hurled against a metal advertising board by West Ham's Len Jarvis. Others were stretchered off following heavy tackles. The East Ham Echo reported: "From the very first kick of the ball it was seen likely to be some trouble, but the storm burst when Dean and Jarvis came into collision (Millwall had two players sent off during the match). This aroused considerable excitement among the spectators. The crowds on the bank having caught the fever, free fights were plentiful." In 1910 Millwall decided to drop Athletic from their name and move out of East London. With limited expansion space on the Isle of Dogs, the club wanted to boost support and attendances. It moved four miles to The Den, in New Cross, South London. The last East London derby between the teams was at Millwall's North Greenwich ground on 24 September 1910; West Ham won 2–0 with goals from Danny Shea and Fred Blackburn. Four months later, Millwall travelled to Upton Park as a team from South East London for the first time. The game ended in a 2–2 draw. On 9 March 1912, 28,400 supporters saw West Ham's first visit to The Den. The Lions won the game 5–1, with their Welsh international striker Wally Davis scoring a hat-trick.

=== Two World Wars and joining the Football League: 1915–45 ===
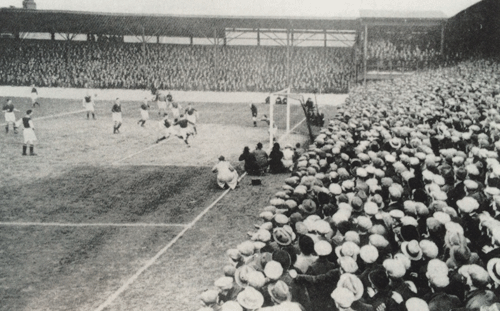
West Ham attack the Millwall goal at Upton Park in the FA Cup, 15 February 1930.

A number of friendlies and non-competitive derbies took place during the First and Second World Wars. In total, 33 matches were played between the teams in Wartime Leagues. They both fielded severely depleted sides of juniors, reserves and non-professionals, playing 14 games in the London Combination between 1915 and 1919. West Ham won nine, Millwall three and two were drawn. After the First World War, the Football League was reintroduced in England by The Football Association and West Ham joined the Second Division for the 1919–20 season. Millwall joined the inaugural Third Division in the 1920–21 season, in the Football League expansion of 44 clubs to 66.

There is a tradition that antagonisms were deepened during the General Strike of 1926, or during a trade dispute a generation earlier; when a Millwall leaning workforce - typically said to be one of the dockyards - undermined working-class solidarity by becoming 'scab labour', either not going out on strike, or prematurely abandoning the strike. Some versions of the story cast the West Ham leaning workforces as the strike-breakers. This tradition has not been substantiated, there were no rival docks by 1926, the city's docks having been brought together under the management of the Port of London Authority in 1909. The dockyards on either side of the river held firm in the General Strike; with only seven out of two thousand workers at the Surrey Docks turning up for work on the strike's first day.

Between 1919 and 1929 the clubs played each other 11 times in the London Professional Footballers' Association Charity Fund and the London Challenge Cup, with West Ham winning five games, Millwall winning three, and three drawn. On 15 February 1930, West Ham won the Fifth Round FA Cup game 4–1 at Upton Park; Vic Watson scored two goals, and Viv Gibbins and Tommy Yews one each. Harold Wadsworth replied for the Lions. The teams met for the first time in the Football League in the 1932–33 season, after West Ham were relegated from the First Division. On 17 September 1932, West Ham beat Millwall 3–0 at Upton Park in the Second Division, two goals being scored by Vic Watson and one by Jackie Morton.

On 27 December 1938, 42,200 spectators at Upton Park saw a Second Division game between the sides end 0–0. As of 2026, this remains the record attendance for the fixture. Between 1939 and 1946 the two clubs played non-competitive fixtures in the League South (A) Division, South Regional League, London League, Football League South and the Football League War Cup. They played 19 games against each other during the Second World War: Millwall won 3, West Ham 12 and 4 were drawn. The Den was severely damaged by a German bomb in 1943, and for a brief time Millwall were invited by their neighbours Charlton Athletic, Crystal Palace and West Ham to play their games at The Valley, Selhurst Park and Upton Park. To offset the shortage of professional players during the Second World War, a guest player system was introduced. Players such as Sailor Brown, Louis Cardwell and Jimmy Jinks played for both clubs during this period. West Ham lost 2–1 to Chelsea at White Hart Lane in the 1944–45 War Time Cup semi-final, with two Millwall guest-players in their team – both of whom went on to play for Millwall in the South Final, which they lost to Chelsea 2–0.

=== Different leagues and hooliganism: 1946–87 ===
"The volatility of the fixture reflected a warped social history. The rivalry had soured, mutated. It defied rational analysis of the fault lines between dockers and shipbuilders, founding fathers of each club. The heresy of scab labour, early in the last century, was given a murderous dimension in a subsequent generation by gangland wars involving the Krays and the Richardsons. The game was a tribal ritual, an end in itself."

— Michael Calvin, from his book Family: Life, Death and Football

After the Second World War Millwall's form was poor and the club dropped into the Third and Fourth Division of the Football League. West Ham have never played below the Second Division in their history and often played a league or two above Millwall. The two sides did not play each other competitively between 13 October 1959 and 7 October 1978, making the 1960s the only decade the teams have not met. Despite the infrequency of their meetings, both sets of supporters still consider the other club their major rival. During these years, the Hammers enjoyed considerable success, winning the FA Cup in 1964, 1975 and 1980. They also won the European Cup Winners' Cup in 1965. Over four decades the sides were only in the same tier of the Football League for three seasons, in 1946–47, 1947–48 and 1978–79. They played two cup games against each other in the Southern Professional Floodlit Cup in 1959 and the Full Members Cup in 1987.

Football hooliganism reached its height in the 1970s and 80s. West Ham's Inter City Firm and the Millwall Bushwackers firm were at the forefront of the trouble, not just against each other, but against the police and firms associated with other football teams. In 1972, the two clubs played each other in a testimonial match for Millwall defender Harry Cripps, who began his career at West Ham. The game was marred by intense fighting between the two club's hooligan firms, both inside and outside the ground. Four years later, a Millwall supporter, Ian Pratt, died at New Cross railway station after falling out of a train during a fight with some West Ham fans. After the incident West Ham hooligans constructed the chant, "West Ham boys, we've got brains, we throw Millwall under trains." Millwall fans waited patiently for two years for revenge, until West Ham were relegated to the Second Division. Prior to their next meeting with the Hammers on 7 October 1978, leaflets were distributed at Millwall's home matches bearing the words: "A West Ham fan must die to avenge him." The police responded with an unprecedented show of force for the game at Upton Park, which West Ham won 3–0. Some 500 police officers controlled the crowd, carrying out extensive searches and strict segregation. Six officers were injured and 70 people were arrested after fans clashed in the street. Numerous weapons were also seized.

The Lions' 2–1 home league victory over the Hammers on 14 May 1979 ended a run of ten games without a win against their rivals, which stretched over 46 years, back to 1933. Pop Robson had given West Ham a half-time lead, but second half goals from Dave Mehmet and Nicky Chatterton gave Millwall the win. On 4 October 1986, more than seven years since the clubs last played each other, 19-year-old West Ham fan Terry Burns was stabbed to death by a group of Millwall supporters on Villiers Street, next to Embankment tube station. A 2–1 victory in the Full Members Cup on 10 November 1987 gave Millwall their first win at Upton Park in 73 years. Alan Dickens gave the Hammers the lead in the second half, but two goals in three minutes from Teddy Sheringham and Tony Cascarino assured Millwall of their first away win in the derby since 1914. As of their last game in 2012, it stands as the Lions last away win in the fixture.

=== First top-flight meeting and the Mother's Day Massacre: 1988–2008 ===
The traditional home kits of Millwall (blue and white) and West Ham (claret and blue).

In 1988, Millwall won the Second Division championship and gained promotion, joining West Ham in the First Division for the first time in the club's history. Paul Ince scored the only goal at The Den on 3 December 1988, as West Ham won the game 1–0. They also won 3–0 at home on 22 April 1989, with goals from Julian Dicks, George Parris and Alan Dickens. This is the first and only time either side has completed a Football League double over the other. At the end of the season West Ham finished 19th and were relegated. Millwall finished 10th, the highest league finish in their history. The 1988–89 season is the only season both teams have been in the top division of English football. Millwall were relegated from the First Division in the 1989–90 season, the last time they appeared in the top tier. During the foundation of the Premier League in 1992, the two teams competed in the tier below in the newly formed First Division. The last game played between the teams at The Den was on 15 November 1992. It was the featured Sunday game on The London Match, an LWT sports show. Millwall won the game 2–1, with goals from Malcolm Allen and Phil Barber. Mark Robson replied for West Ham.

In the 1993–94 season, Millwall moved into the first purpose-built all-seater stadium, after the Taylor Report on the Hillsborough disaster. The Hammers were promoted, spending ten seasons in the Premier League and it was twelve years until they played at Millwall's new ground, The New Den. On Mothering Sunday, 21 March 2004, Millwall beat West Ham 4–1, with two goals from Tim Cahill, one from Nick Chadwick and a Christian Dailly own goal. Marlon Harewood scored the West Ham goal. This is the largest winning margin between the sides in the Football League. In an eventful game, Millwall missed one penalty and had another saved by West Ham goalkeeper Stephen Bywater, who was subsequently sent off. Violence also broke out between the opposing fans. Millwall fans and the media named the match "The Mothers' Day Massacre".

During an open-air showing in Canada Square, London Docklands of an England game against Paraguay at the 2006 World Cup, 100 West Ham and Millwall supporters fought each other, resulting in injuries to 16 people, one of whom required hospital treatment. The police shut down the screening with 10 minutes of the game remaining to be played.

=== Upton Park riot and West Ham move stadiums: 2009–2025 ===
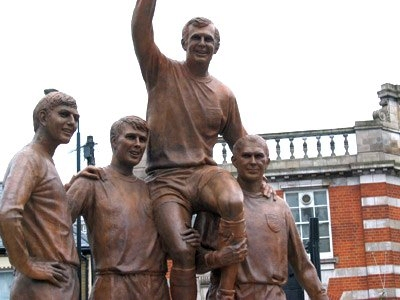
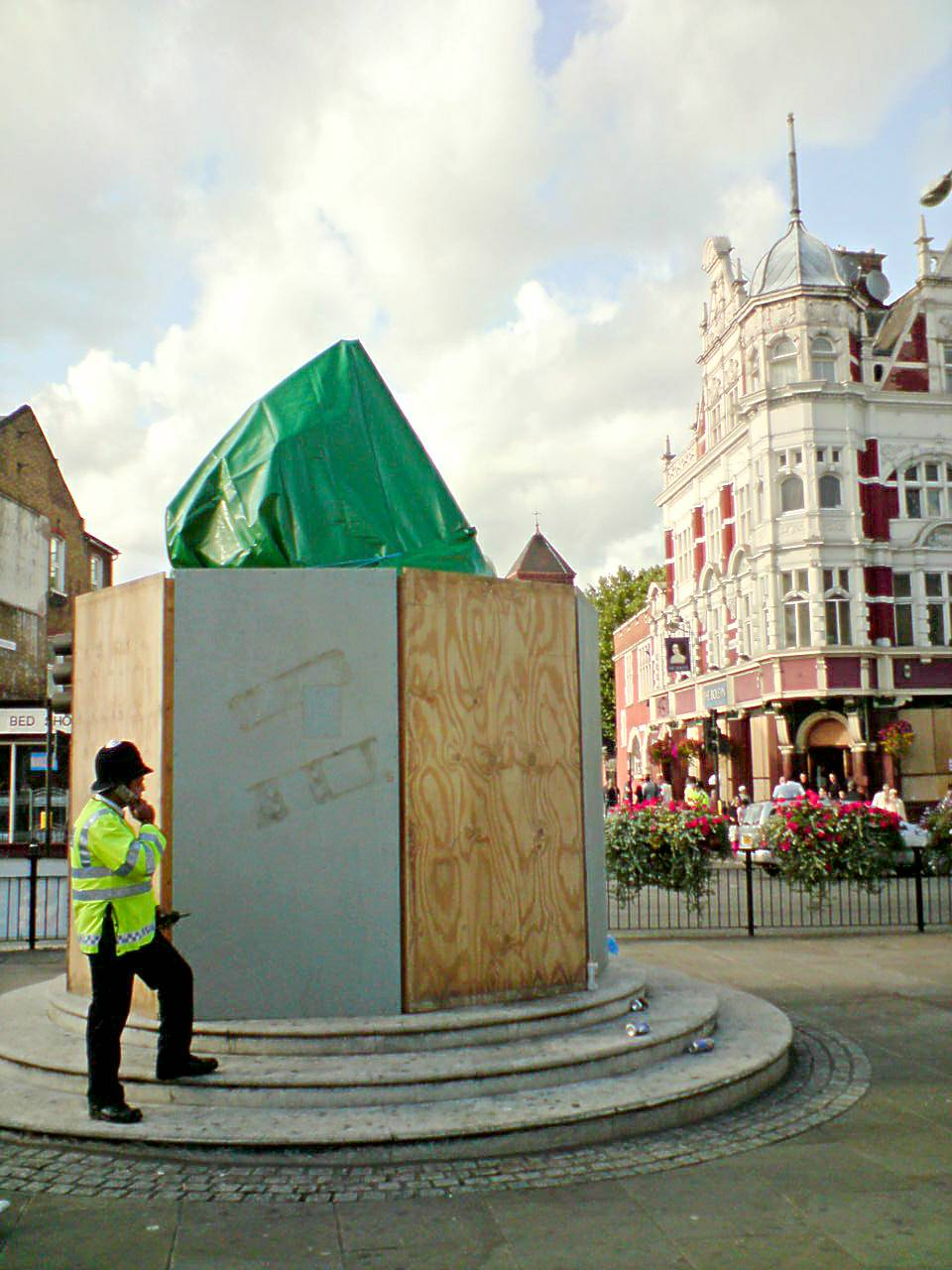
The World Cup Sculpture near Upton Park was boarded up for protection before the visit of Millwall on 25 August 2009.

In the 2009–10 season Millwall were drawn away to West Ham in the League Cup, which was the first meeting between the teams in the competition. The police cut the number of tickets given to travelling Millwall fans from 3,000 to 1,500, sparking anger among supporters; Millwall warned police of a higher probability of trouble. West Ham won the game 3–1 on 25 August 2009, their first win over Millwall in seven games over 18 years. Neil Harris had given Millwall the lead, but a goal from Junior Stanislas three minutes from the final whistle forced the game into extra-time. Stanislas added another and Zavon Hines a third for the win. Violence marred the match before, during and after kick-off, with multiple pitch invasions by Hammers supporters. Lions fan Alan Baker was stabbed outside the ground and suffered a punctured lung, but made a full recovery. He was one of 20 people injured. The police concluded that the violence, because of its large scale, was organised beforehand. The Football Association brought misconduct charges against both clubs. A disciplinary tribunal fined West Ham £115,000 for "failing to ensure that their fans did not enter the field of play and refrained from violent, threatening, obscene and provocative behaviour", but concluded that the allegations against Millwall of "violent, racist behaviour and throwing missiles or dangerous objects on to the pitch" had not been proved.

In a poor 2010–11 season, West Ham manager Avram Grant guided his team to only seven wins from 37 games. On 15 May 2011, the Hammers were relegated from the Premier League after a 3–2 defeat at Wigan Athletic. As Wigan equalised at 2–2, a light aircraft flew above Wigan's ground, the DW Stadium, trailing a banner which read "Avram Grant – Millwall Legend". Grant was sacked after the game. The plane had been hired by Millwall supporters from the fans' website House of Fun, celebrating Grant's failure to prevent West Ham's relegation. Their relegation meant they met the Lions in the 2011–12 Football League Championship. On 17 September 2011, their first league meeting for seven years ended in a 0–0 draw at The Den. The return fixture was on 4 February 2012. West Ham beat Millwall 2–1 at Upton Park, despite having their captain Kevin Nolan sent off after only nine minutes for serious foul play. West Ham's goal scorers were Carlton Cole and Winston Reid. Millwall's goal was by Liam Trotter.

Fixtures between Millwall and West Ham United are currently categorised by the Metropolitan Police as category C – games which carry a high risk of disorder amongst supporters. For the 2011–12 season, the Metropolitan Police implemented London-wide operations to ensure that the games passed by without any incident. In 2013 a member of West Ham's hooligan Inter City Firm was jailed for 12 months for organising violence between West Ham and Millwall fans during an FA Cup match between Dagenham & Redbridge and Millwall on 7 January 2012. He chose this game in the belief fewer police would be in attendance at a match in Dagenham, but who instead turned out in force to prevent trouble. In November 2014 the two sides' development squads were drawn against each other in the U21 Premier League Cup. The Metropolitan Police took preventive measures against any trouble occurring, demanding the game at Rush Green kick-off at 12pm and be played behind closed doors.

In the summer of 2016, West Ham moved into the London Stadium in Stratford, which ended 112 years at Upton Park. Millwall and West Ham are now less than four miles (6.23 km) apart. On 24 August 2017, 56-year-old Nottingham Forest fan Paul O'Donnell died following an attack by Millwall fan Andrew Lewis, after O'Donnell had allegedly said "West Ham" to Lewis. A charge of manslaughter was eventually dropped against 50-year-old Lewis, but he was jailed for two years after admitting inflicting grievous bodily harm on O'Donnell.

In 2018, Hammers and Lions fans put their rivalry aside to help raise money for a West Ham fan suffering from cancer. Three-year-old Isla Caton needed money for expensive treatment of her neuroblastoma condition. A Millwall fan did a sponsored run in a West Ham kit from The Den to the London Stadium to help raise funds for the sick girl. Shortly after her death in 2022, West Ham and Millwall jointly released a statement of condolences in solidarity with the Caton family.

=== The rivalry returns: 2026–present ===
At the end of the 2025–26 season, West Ham were relegated from the Premier League, ensuring that the two clubs would meet again in the EFL Championship during the following 2026–27 season. In preparation for the first derby in 14 years, the Metropolitan Police issued a Section 35 dispersal order covering a large part of South London, from Tower Bridge to Blackheath, as well as deploying 400 police officers for the game. On 19 September 2026, the Lions dominated the first half and led 2–0 at half-time, thanks to goals from Caleb Taylor and Camiel Neghli. West Ham came back strongly in the second half to draw the game 2–2, with goals from Mohamadou Kanté on the 74th minute and a headed equaliser from Konstantinos Mavropanos six minutes later. Kanté was later sent off in the 89th minute for a professional foul on Millwall winger Kyrell Lisbie.

== Results ==
As of 19 September 2026

=== By competition ===
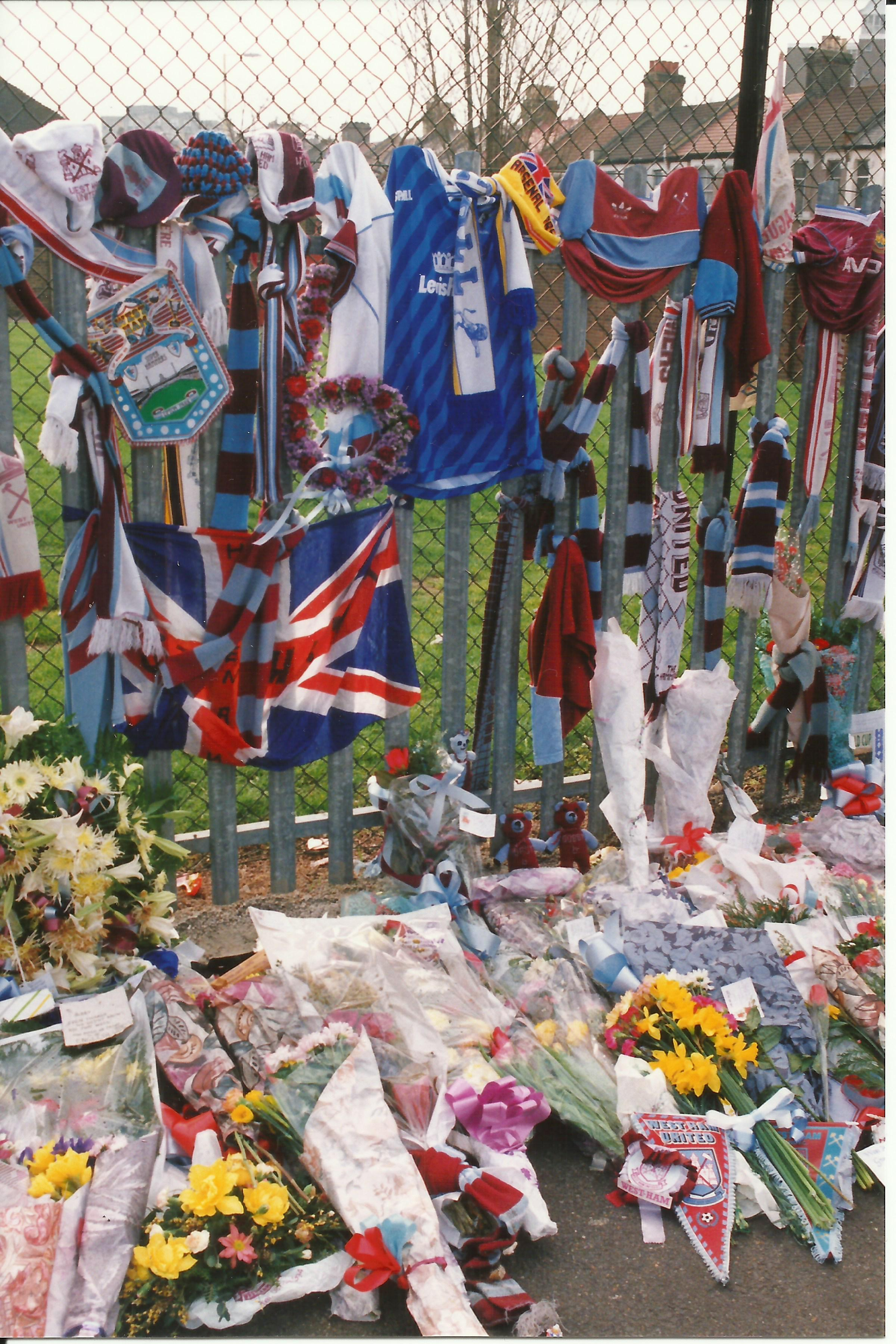
Despite the rivalry, Millwall fans left tokens of remembrance at Upton Park for West Ham player Bobby Moore after his death in 1993.

Competition	Played	Millwall wins	Drawn	West Ham wins	Millwall goals	West Ham goals
Football League	25	5	12	8	25	35
FA Cup	2	1	0	1	3	5
Football League Cup	1	0	0	1	1	3
Full Members' Cup	1	1	0	0	2	1
Sub-total	29	7	12	10	31	44
Southern Floodlight Cup	1	0	0	1	1	3
Southern Football League	32	15	8	9	46	32
Western Football League	14	8	3	3	23	13
London League	6	2	2	2	11	12
London Challenge Cup	6	3	0	3	8	12
Southern Professional Charity Cup	2	1	0	1	8	3
London PFA Charity Fund	10	2	3	5	15	23
Total	100	38	28	34	143	142

This table only includes competitive first-team games, excluding all pre-season games, friendlies, abandoned matches, testimonials and games played during the First and Second World Wars. (Note: Five other contests in 1900, 1902, 1919, 1926 and 1929 were played, abandoned and not completed due to fog and bad light. In 1930 there was an alteration in the London FA Challenge Cup, the rule "Clubs must play their strongest elevens" was deleted. After that, the competition was considered to be for reserves and the six games between the clubs after that date are not classed as first-team games.)

=== Full list of results ===
Score lists home team first.

Date	Score	Winner	Competition	Venue	Attendance	Notes	H2H
9 December 1899	1–2	Millwall Athletic	FA Cup	Memorial Grounds	15,000	1899–1900 Fifth Qualifying Round match. First competitive game.	+1
23 December 1899	0–2	Millwall Athletic	Southern League	Memorial Grounds	8,000	Abandoned after 69 minutes due to fog. Completed on 28 April 1900.	+2
28 April 1900	0–1	Thames Ironworks	Southern League	Athletic Grounds	9,000	Remaining 21 minutes of abandoned game played after return fixture, with no further score.	+1
8 September 1900	3–1	Millwall Athletic	Southern League	Athletic Grounds	11,000		+2
21 March 1901	1–0	West Ham United	Southern League	Memorial Grounds	9,000		+1
9 September 1901	4–0	West Ham United	London League	Memorial Grounds	5,000		0
26 October 1901	0–2	Millwall Athletic	Southern League	Memorial Grounds	10,000		+1
26 December 1901	1–5	West Ham United	London League	North Greenwich	6,000		0
8 February 1902	1–1	Draw	Southern League	North Greenwich	10,000		0
5 April 1902	0–1	Millwall Athletic	Western League	Memorial Grounds	5,000		+1
9 April 1902	2–1	West Ham United	Southern Professional Charity Cup	Memorial Grounds	2,000	First-round match.	0
26 April 1902	1–0	Millwall Athletic	Western League	North Greenwich	5,000		+1
8 November 1902	0–3	Millwall Athletic	Southern League	Memorial Grounds	10,000		+2
29 November 1902	2–2	Draw	London League	North Greenwich	3,000		+2
24 November 1902	2–1	Millwall Athletic	Western League	North Greenwich	200	Lowest attendance recorded.	+3
5 January 1903	2–2	Draw	London League	Memorial Grounds	1,500		+3
9 March 1903	1–1	Draw	Western League	Memorial Grounds	2,000		+3
2 April 1903	1–7	Millwall Athletic	Southern Professional Charity Cup	Memorial Grounds	1,500	Semi-final, largest recorded win in a competitive game between the sides.	+4
25 April 1903	2–1	Millwall Athletic	Southern League	North Greenwich	8,000		+5
5 September 1903	4–2	Millwall Athletic	Southern League	North Greenwich	15,000		+6
5 October 1903	0–3	Millwall Athletic	London League	Memorial Grounds	6,000		+7
2 January 1904	0–1	Millwall Athletic	Southern League	Memorial Grounds	9,000		+8
29 February 1904	4–0	Millwall Athletic	London League	North Greenwich	6,000	Millwall 12 games unbeaten (their longest streak). Most consecutive wins in the fixture (6).	+9
1 September 1904	3–0	West Ham United	Southern League	Upton Park	12,000	First ever game played at Upton Park. West Ham now based in Essex.	+8
17 September 1904	1–1	Draw	Southern League	North Greenwich	10,000		+8
20 March 1905	4–3	West Ham United	Western League	Upton Park	4,000		+7
24 April 1905	4–0	Millwall Athletic	Western League	North Greenwich	4,000		+8
9 September 1905	1–0	Millwall Athletic	Southern League	North Greenwich	13,000		+9
25 December 1905	0–0	Draw	Western League	North Greenwich	10,000		+9
6 January 1906	1–0	West Ham United	Southern League	Upton Park	8,000		+8
16 April 1906	0–1	Millwall Athletic	Western League	Upton Park	9,000	First Millwall win at Upton Park.	+9
17 September 1906	1–0	West Ham United	Western League	Upton Park	10,000		+8
13 October 1906	1–1	Draw	Southern League	North Greenwich	15,000		+8
19 November 1906	0–3	West Ham United	Western League	North Greenwich	2,000		+7
16 February 1907	0–1	Millwall Athletic	Southern League	Upton Park	17,000		+8
9 September 1907	3–0	Millwall Athletic	Western League	North Greenwich	3,000		+9
16 September 1907	1–1	Draw	Western League	Upton Park	3,000		+9
26 October 1907	1–0	Millwall Athletic	Southern League	North Greenwich	15,000		+10
22 February 1908	0–2	Millwall Athletic	Southern League	Upton Park	16,000		+11
7 September 1908	0–2	Millwall Athletic	Western League	Upton Park	5,000		+12
14 September 1908	3–1	Millwall Athletic	Western League	North Greenwich	3,000		+13
7 November 1908	1–0	West Ham United	Southern League	Upton Park	16,000		+12
13 March 1909	1–0	Millwall Athletic	Southern League	North Greenwich	10,000		+13
26 April 1909	5–1	West Ham United	London PFA Charity Fund	Upton Park	1,500	Alf Twigg scored his tenth derby goal for Millwall, a record.	+12
20 September 1909	1–0	West Ham United	London Challenge Cup	Upton Park	5,000	First-round match.	+11
13 November 1909	0–0	Draw	Southern League	North Greenwich	10,000		+11
26 March 1910	1–2	Millwall Athletic	Southern League	Upton Park	12,000		+12
24 September 1910	0–2	West Ham United	Southern League	North Greenwich	10,000	Last game before Millwall moved from East to South East London.	+11
28 January 1911	2–2	Draw	Southern League	Upton Park	12,000	First game after Millwall moved from East to South East London.	+11
4 November 1911	2–1	West Ham United	Southern League	Upton Park	23,000		+10
9 March 1912	5–1	Millwall	Southern League	The Den	28,400	First West Ham visit to The Den.	+11
22 September 1912	6–2	West Ham United	London Challenge Cup	Upton Park	7,000	First-round match.	+10
30 November 1912	1–1	Draw	Southern League	Upton Park	15,000		+10
5 April 1913	1–3	West Ham United	Southern League	The Den	30,000	First West Ham win at The Den.	+9
1 September 1913	1–1	Draw	Southern League	The Den	10,000		+9
22 September 1913	0–1	Millwall	London Challenge Cup	Upton Park	5,000	First-round match.	+10
14 April 1914	3–2	West Ham United	Southern League	Upton Park	15,000		+9
17 October 1914	2–1	Millwall	Southern League	The Den	20,000		+10
9 November 1914	0–1	Millwall	London Challenge Cup	Upton Park	3,000	Semi-final match.	+11
20 February 1915	1–1	Draw	Southern League	Upton Park	12,000		+11
20 October 1919	3–3	Draw	London PFA Charity Fund	The Den	6,000		+11
14 April 1920	3–1	West Ham United	London PFA Charity Fund	Upton Park	8,000		+10
15 November 1920	0–1	West Ham United	London PFA Charity Fund	The Den	5,000		+9
8 October 1923	2–0	Millwall	London PFA Charity Fund	The Den	7,600		+10
5 November 1923	2–1	Millwall	London Challenge Cup	The Den	5,000	Second-round match	+11
13 October 1924	3–1	West Ham United	London PFA Charity Fund	Upton Park	6,500		+10
25 October 1926	2–2	Draw	London PFA Charity Fund	Upton Park	4,000		+10
22 November 1926	1–1	Draw	London PFA Charity Fund	Upton Park	3,500		+10
10 October 1927	5–1	Millwall	London PFA Charity Fund	The Den	6,500		+11
8 October 1928	5–1	West Ham United	London PFA Charity Fund	Upton Park	5,000		+10
25 November 1929	2–4	West Ham United	London Challenge Cup	The Den	6,000	Semi-final match.	+9
15 February 1930	4–1	West Ham United	FA Cup	Upton Park	24,000	Fifth-round match.	+8
17 September 1932	3–0	West Ham United	Second Division	Upton Park	35,000	First Football League game between the teams.	+7
31 January 1933	1–0	Millwall	Second Division	The Den	8,000		+8
21 October 1933	2–2	Draw	Second Division	The Den	35,000	Highest attendance recorded at Millwall in the derby.	+8
3 March 1934	1–1	Draw	Second Division	Upton Park	28,000		+8
27 December 1938	0–0	Draw	Second Division	Upton Park	42,200	Highest attendance recorded in the fixture.	+8
27 March 1939	0–2	West Ham United	Second Division	The Den	10,000		+7
21 September 1946	3–1	West Ham United	Second Division	Upton Park	30,400		+6
25 January 1947	0–0	Draw	Second Division	The Den	22,082		+6
25 August 1947	1–1	Draw	Second Division	Upton Park	25,000		+6
1 September 1947	1–1	Draw	Second Division	The Den	15,814		+6
13 October 1959	3–1	West Ham United	Southern Floodlight Cup	Upton Park	8,250	First-round match.	+5
7 October 1978	3–0	West Ham United	Second Division	Upton Park	22,210	West Ham 10 games unbeaten (their longest streak). First derby since London boundary change of 1965.	+4
14 May 1979	2–1	Millwall	Second Division	The Den	11,917		+5
10 November 1987	1–2	Millwall	Full Members Cup	Upton Park	11,337	First-round match.	+6
3 December 1988	0–1	West Ham United	First Division	The Den	20,105	First meeting of the teams in the top division of English football.	+5
22 April 1989	3–0	West Ham United	First Division	Upton Park	16,603	With this win West Ham completed the only Football League double.	+4
10 November 1990	1–1	Draw	Second Division	The Den	20,591		+4
24 February 1991	3–1	West Ham United	Second Division	Upton Park	20,503		+3
15 November 1992	2–1	Millwall	First Division	The Den	12,445	Last game played between the teams at the old Den.	+4
28 March 1993	2–2	Draw	First Division	Upton Park	15,723		+4
28 September 2003	1–1	Draw	First Division	Upton Park	31,626		+4
21 March 2004	4–1	Millwall	First Division	The Den	14,055	First game at The New Den, also widest winning-margin between the sides in the Football League.	+5
21 November 2004	1–0	Millwall	Championship	The Den	15,025		+6
16 April 2005	1–1	Draw	Championship	Upton Park	28,221		+6
25 August 2009	3–1^{AET}	West Ham United	League Cup	Upton Park	24,492	Second-round match, notable for the 2009 Upton Park riot.	+5
17 September 2011	0–0	Draw	Championship	The Den	16,078		+5
4 February 2012	2–1	West Ham United	Championship	Upton Park	27,774	Last game played between the teams at Upton Park.	+4
19 September 2026	2–2	Draw	Championship	The Den	19,639	The 100th competitive meeting between the clubs. Kanté sent-off for West Ham.	+4
21 February 2027	–		Championship	London Stadium		First game played between the two teams at London Stadium.	

== Statistics ==
=== Firsts ===
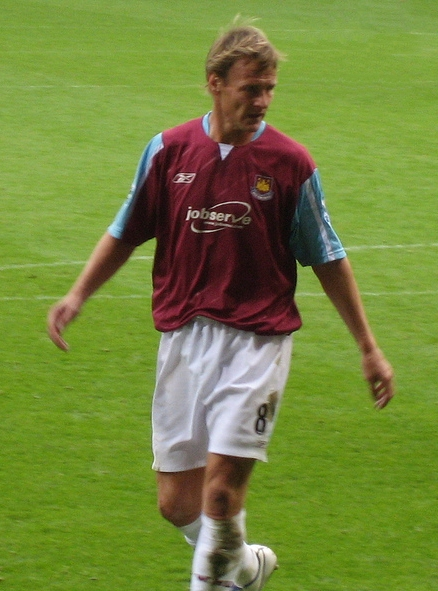
Teddy Sheringham scored 111 goals for the Lions and 30 for the Hammers, he was also a coach for West Ham.

- First ever meeting: Millwall Athletic 2–0 Thames Ironworks (friendly), 23 September 1897
- First competitive meeting: Thames Ironworks 1–2 Millwall Athletic (FA Cup), 9 December 1899
- First league meeting: Thames Ironworks 0–2 Millwall Athletic (Southern League), 23 December 1899
- First football league meeting: West Ham United 3–0 Millwall (Second Division), 17 September 1932
- First away victory for Millwall: Thames Ironworks 1–2 Millwall Athletic (FA Cup), 9 December 1899
- First away victory for West Ham United: Millwall Athletic 0–1 Thames Ironworks (Southern League), 28 April 1900

=== Results ===
- Highest scoring game: 8 goals (twice)
  - West Ham United 1–7 Millwall Athletic, 2 April 1903
  - West Ham United 6–2 Millwall, 22 September 1912
- Largest winning margin (Millwall): 6 goals
  - West Ham United 1–7 Millwall Athletic, 2 April 1903
- Largest winning margin (West Ham United): 4 goals (four times)
  - West Ham United 4–0 Millwall Athletic, 9 September 1901
  - Millwall Athletic 1–5 West Ham United, 26 December 1901
  - West Ham United 6–2 Millwall, 22 September 1912
  - West Ham United 5–1 Millwall, 8 October 1928
- League doubles: 1 (1988–89 season. West Ham beat Millwall home and away.)

=== Trends ===
- Most consecutive wins (Millwall): 6, 2 April 1903 – 29 February 1904
- Most consecutive wins (West Ham United): 4, 8 October 1928 – 17 September 1932
- Longest undefeated run (Millwall): 12 (nine wins, three draws), 26 April 1902 – 1 September 1904
- Longest undefeated run (West Ham United): 10 (four wins, six draws), 21 October 1933 – 14 May 1979
- Longest undefeated run in the Football League (Millwall): 7 (three wins, four draws), 15 November 1992 – 17 September 2011
- Longest undefeated run in the Football League (West Ham United): 9 (three wins, six draws), 21 October 1933 – 7 October 1978
- Home form in the Football League: In 12 attempts Millwall never won at Upton Park in the Football League. They have attained six draws and six defeats over a period of 80 years, from 1932 to 2012. West Ham have won twice at the old Den, in 1939 and 1988. They have never won at the new Den, in four attempts.
- Most consecutive draws: 3 (twice), 21 October 1933 – 27 December 1938; 25 January 1947 – 1 September 1947
- Most consecutive games without a draw: 8 (twice), 9 December 1899 – 26 December 1901; 26 October 1907 – 20 September 1909
- Most games played against each other in a season: 7 (twice), 9 September 1901 – 26 April 1902; 8 November 1902 – 25 April 1903
- Longest period without playing each other: 18 years, 11 months, 24 days. 13 October 1959 – 7 October 1978 (the 1960s is the only decade the teams have not met since they were formed.)
- Record highest attendance: 42,200. 27 December 1947, Upton Park. West Ham United 0 Millwall 0
- Record lowest attendance: 200. 24 November 1902, North Greenwich. Millwall Athletic 2 West Ham United 1
- Record goal scorer: Alf Twigg (10), Millwall. Scored his first on 16 April 1906 and his tenth on 26 April 1909.

=== Honours ===
Millwall	Major competitions	West Ham
Continental
0	UEFA Conference League	1
0	UEFA Intertoto Cup	1
0	UEFA Cup Winners' Cup	1
National
0	FA Cup	3
0	FA Community Shield	1
Regional
1	London League	2
4	London Challenge Cup	9
5	Total	18

==== Minor titles ====
Millwall	Minor competitions	West Ham
National
1	Division 2/Championship	2
3	Division 3/League One	0
1	Division 4/League Two	0
1	Division 3 Cup	0
1	Group Cup / EFL Trophy	0
Regional
2	Southern League	0
0	Southern League Division 2	1
2	Western League	1
2	United League	0
0	Southern Floodlit Cup	1
1	Southern Charity Cup	0
14	Total	5

== Crossing the divide ==
=== Managers and coaches ===
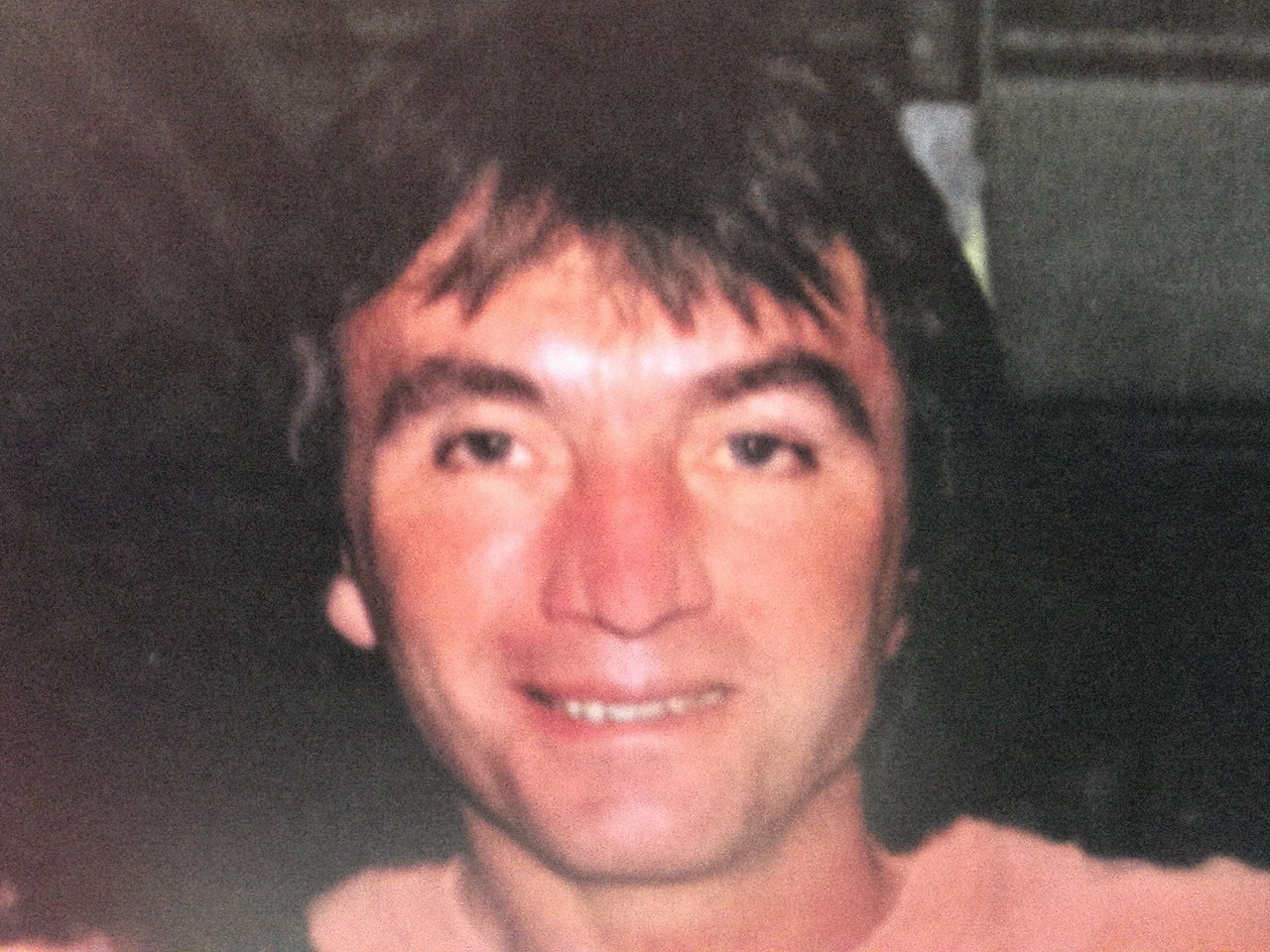
Billy Bonds, West Ham's record appearance holder, is the only manager to take charge of both clubs.

Billy Bonds is the only manager to have managed both clubs. He was in charge of West Ham from February 1990 to August 1994, managing the club for 227 games as the team yo-yoed between the First and Second divisions. He guided them to two promotions and one relegation. He resigned in August 1994. He was appointed as Millwall manager in May 1997 by chairman Theo Paphitis — an unpopular decision with many Lions fans due to his West Ham allegiance. Bonds, from south London, had several family members who were Millwall fans; a fact which meant some supporters felt he should be given a chance. After a good start, the team narrowly avoided relegation, finishing 18th in the Second Division. Bonds was sacked in May 1998, having been in charge of the side for only 53 games.

Ted Fenton managed West Ham from 1950 to 1961 and was responsible for the establishment of youth development at the club, the Academy of Football. He won the 1957–58 Second Division championship, assuring top-flight football for the Hammers for the first time since 1932. His brother Benny Fenton started his career as a player at West Ham in 1937, before moving to Millwall in 1939. After he retired as a footballer, he moved into management, managing Millwall from 1966 to 1974. On 17 January 1967 he was manager of the Lions team that established an English Football League record of 59 games unbeaten at home. The record was eventually taken by Liverpool in 1981, who went 85 games unbeaten at Anfield in all competitions.

Pat Holland, an FA Cup winner in 1975 with West Ham, served as Millwall assistant manager to Willie Donachie in 2006. After Donachie was fired in 2007, he continued on as chief scout until 2009. In June 2011 former Millwall player Sam Allardyce was appointed as manager of West Ham. In June 2013 Millwall appointed former Hammers captain Steve Lomas as their new manager. Lomas joined ex-West Ham defender Tim Breacker, who was Millwall's first-team coach. As a former West Ham player, Lomas' appointment was unpopular with many Millwall fans. Lomas was sacked on 26 December 2013, after winning only five of his 22 games in charge. In May 2014, former Millwall and West Ham player, Teddy Sheringham was appointed as an attacking coach with West Ham for the 2014–15 season. Sheringham left in May 2015 to become manager of Stevenage.

=== Players ===
Players who have played for both teams. Sailor Brown, Peter Buchanan, Johnny Burke, Louis Cardwell, Jimmy Jinks and Harold Pearson also played for both sides as wartime guest players.

- (England) Gary Alexander
- (England) Clive Allen
- (England) Paul Allen
- (England) Charles Ambler
- (Antigua and Barbuda) Moses Ashikodi
- (England) Joe Blythe
- (England) Gary Bowes
- (England) Kenny Brown
- (England) Jack Burkett
- (England) Dennis Burnett
- (England) Stephen Bywater
- (England) Tony Cottee
- (England) Harry Cripps
- (England) Roger Cross
- (England) Brian Dear
- (England) Charlie Dove
- (England) Benny Fenton
- (Republic of Ireland) David Forde
- (England) Ryan Fredericks
- (England) Paul Goddard
- (England) Dale Gordon
- (Wales) Fred Griffiths
- (Scotland) John Hamilton
- (England) Terry Hurlock
- (Scotland) Don Hutchison
- (England) Andy Impey
- (England) Tommy Inns
- (England) Matt Jarvis
- (England) Glen Johnson
- (England) Jack Landells
- (Scotland) Lawrie Leslie
- (England) Dave Mangnall
- (England) David Martin (son of Alvin Martin, West Ham's fifth longest serving player)
- (England) Joe Martin (son of Alvin Martin)
- (England) Tommy Moore
- (England) Frank Neary
- (England) George Neil
- (Australia) Lucas Neill
- (England) Harry Obeney
- (England) Anton Otulakowski
- (England) John Payne
- (England) Graham Paddon
- (England) Wilf Phillips
- (England) Jack Powell
- (England) Peter Reader (Note: Reader played at youth level for West Ham United and did not make a first team appearance.)
- (England) Neil Ruddock
- (England) Teddy Sheringham
- (England) Fred Shreeve
- (England) Jim Standen
- (Scotland) Willie Stewart

== In popular culture ==
=== In film ===
The rivalry between the teams, specifically the clubs' two hooligan firms has been depicted on the big screen several times. In 1989, Alan Clarke directed The Firm, starring real-life Millwall supporter Gary Oldman. He plays Bex, leader of the football firm the Inter City Crew, a fictional representation of West Ham's Inter City Firm and their violent exploits. In it, Millwall's Bushwackers firm are depicted as The Buccaneers. Green Street was released in 2004, with real-life Hammers supporter Elijah Wood playing an American student who gets involved with West Ham's firm. The film builds up to the big clash with Millwall's firm at the climax, after the two teams draw each other in the Cup, foreshadowing the reality of the League Cup game which led to the 2009 Upton Park riot. It was a moderate financial success, grossing just over $3 million worldwide.

"They're like two brothers, but only one of them can be king. They have the same blood but would kill each other to take the throne. They are two like-for-like cultures and people and all that separates them is the Thames. It's like they're looking at a mirror image of themselves."

— Cass Pennant, leader of West Ham's Inter City Firm

The rise of a football hooligan, Carlton Leach, is chronicled in 2007's Rise of the Footsoldier, from his beginnings on the terraces to becoming a member of a notorious gang of criminals. The bitter rivalry between the Hammers and the Lions is displayed, by the use of original footage, during the opening scenes of the film. In 2009, a direct-to-video sequel to Green Street was made, Green Street 2: Stand Your Ground. It follows on directly from the original's climax, with several members of West Ham's and Millwall's firms ending up in prison together and arranging a football match." A remake of The Firm, also titled The Firm was released in 2009 by Nick Love, director of The Football Factory and himself a Millwall supporter. Set in the 1980s, the film highlights the music, fashion and culture surrounding football at the time. It was generally well received by critics. In October 2009, the Metropolitan Police released still photos from the film in relation to a search for hooligans from the Upton Park riot. The mistake led to an apology from Scotland Yard. The 2012 zombie comedy Cockneys vs Zombies referenced the rivalry, showing Millwall and West Ham zombies fighting amongst themselves in East London after a zombie apocalypse. In 2013 a third film in the Green Street franchise, Green Street 3: Never Back Down was released. It focuses on a rivalry between West Ham and Millwall fans within mixed martial arts.

=== In literature ===
As with film, the rivalry between the clubs' hooligan firms has been covered in books such as Congratulations You Have Just Met the ICF by Cass Pennant, leader of the Inter City Firm. No One Likes Us, We Don't Care: True Stories from Millwall, Britain's Most Notorious Football Hooligans by Andrew Woods focuses on the fights between the two firms, from the perspective of Millwall's Bushwackers. Sunday Mirror columnist Mike Calvin spent the 2009–10 season covering Millwall's Play-off promotion, writing the book Family: Life, Death and Football. The beginning extensively features the rivalry and the stabbing of a Millwall supporter before the 2009 Upton Park riot game. Millwall vs West Ham: il derby della working class londinese (English, The London Working Class Derby) is a 2014 Italian book on the rivalry by Luca Manes. It chronicles the derby from its inception, declaring it to be one of the most feared matches in world football.

== Gallery ==
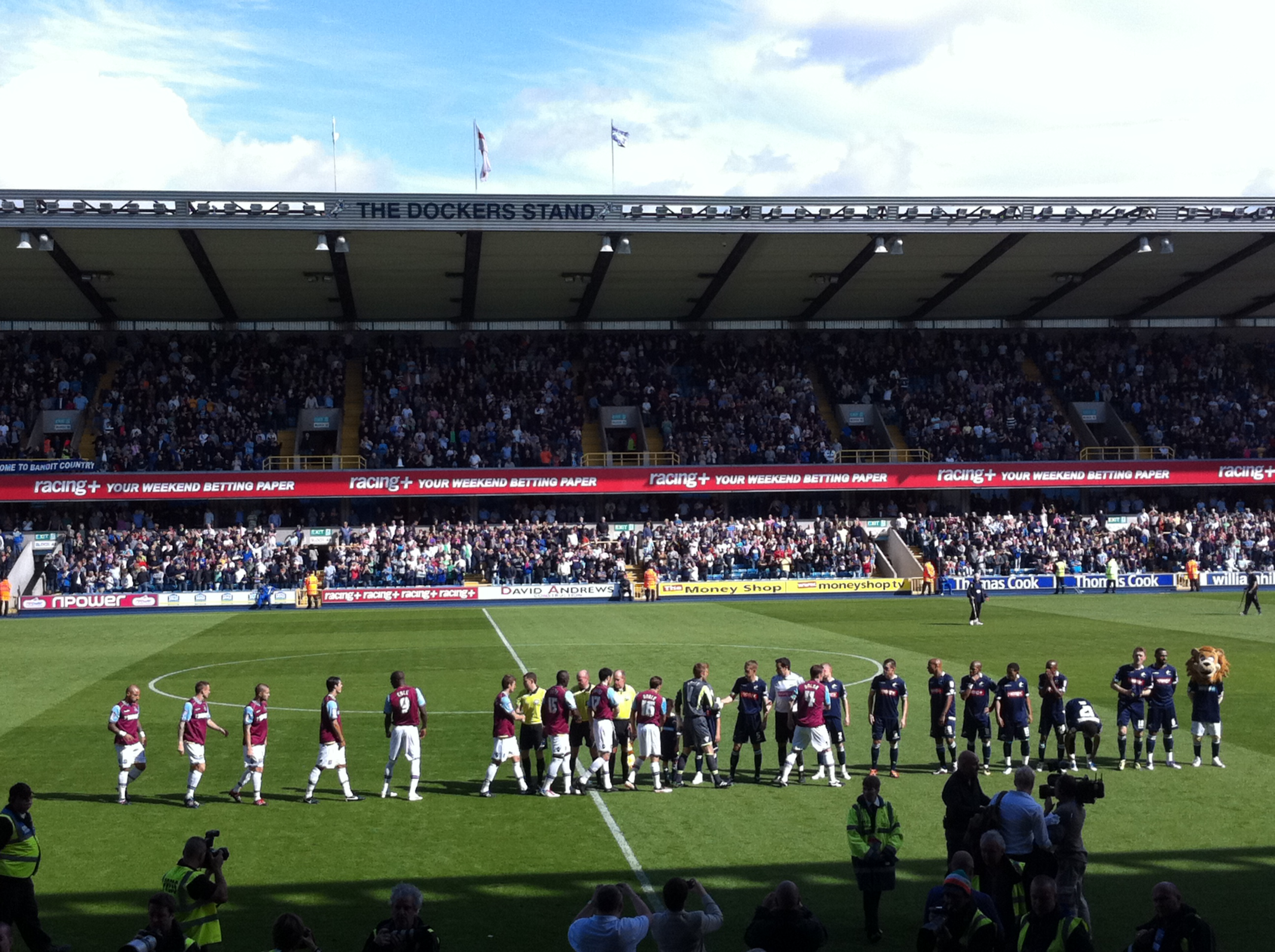
West Ham and Millwall players shake hands before kick-off at The Den on 17 September 2011.

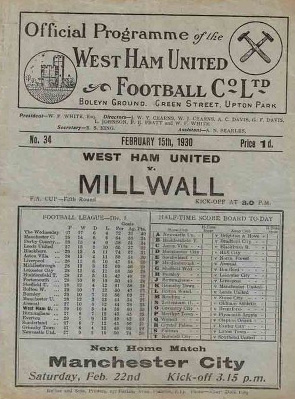
Programme from a Fifth round FA Cup game between the teams on 15 February 1930

Millwall fans celebrate an equalising goal in the last game between the sides at Upton Park in 2012.

== See also ==
- Major football rivalries
- London derbies
- Leeds United F.C.–Millwall F.C. rivalry
- East London derby
- South London derby
