= William Bridgeman =

William Bridgeman may refer to:

- William Bridgeman, 1st Viscount Bridgeman (1864–1935), British Conservative politician
- William Bridgeman (Bramber MP) (c. 1646–1699), English civil servant and MP
- Bill Bridgeman (1916–1968), American test pilot
- Billy Bridgeman (1884–1947), English footballer
