= 2004 United States House of Representatives elections in North Carolina =

- November 3, 2004

All 13 North Carolina seats in the United States House of Representatives
	Majority party	Minority party
Party	Republican	Democratic
Last election	7	6
Seats won	7	6
Seat change	Steady	Steady
Popular vote	1,743,131	1,669,864
Percentage	51.07%	48.93%
Swing	▼2.80%	▲5.67%

Republican
50–60%
60–70%
70–80%
Democratic
50–60%
60–70%
70–80%
80–90%

The United States House of Representative elections of 2004 in North Carolina were held on November 3, 2004, as part of the biennial election to the United States House of Representatives. All thirteen seats in North Carolina, and 435 nationwide, were elected.

The parties' positions were unchanged. The Democrats gained in the popular vote share across the state, thanks predominantly to running candidates in two districts they hadn't contested in 2002. However, no districts changed hands. Two new Republican representatives were elected to replace non-running incumbents: Patrick McHenry and Virginia Foxx. G. K. Butterfield retained the seat that he had won in a special election earlier in the year.

== Summary ==
2004 United States House of Representative elections in North Carolina – Summary
Party	Seats	Gains	Losses	Net gain/loss	Seats %	Votes %	Votes	+/−
Republican	7	0	0	±0	53.85	51.07	1,743,131	–2.80
Democratic	6	0	0	±0	46.15	48.93	1,669,864	+5.67

== District 1 ==
2004 North Carolina's 1st congressional district election
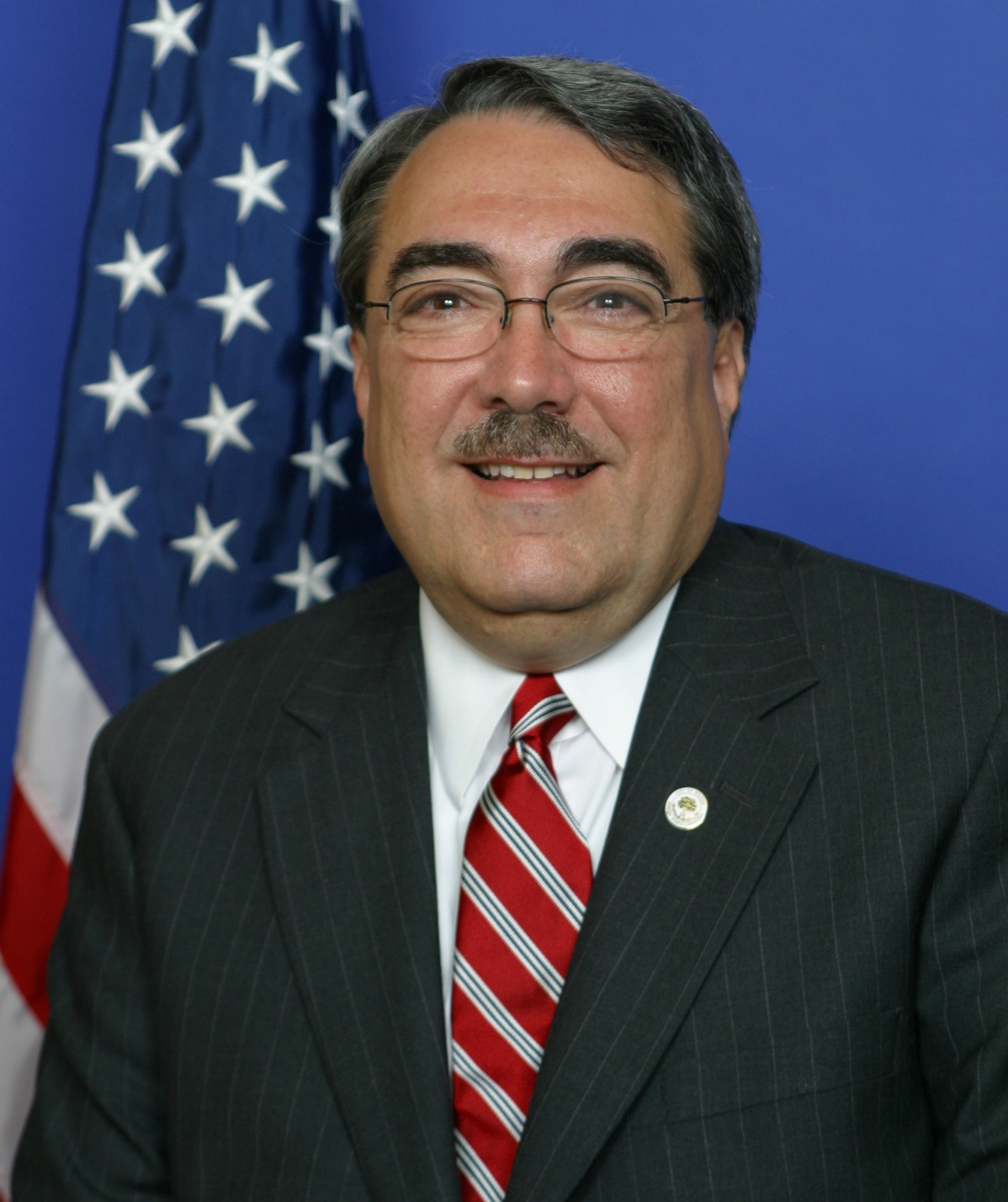

Nominee	G. K. Butterfield	Greg Dority
Party	Democratic	Republican
Popular vote	137,667	77,508
Percentage	64.0%	36.0%
- County results Butterfield: 50–60% 60–70% 70–80% Dority: 50–60%
U.S. Representative before election
G. K. Butterfield
Democratic
Elected U.S. Representative
G. K. Butterfield
Democratic

=== Predictions ===
Source	Ranking	As of
The Cook Political Report	Safe D	October 29, 2004
Sabato's Crystal Ball	Safe D	November 1, 2004

=== Results ===
2004 United States House of Representatives North Carolina 1st District election
Party	Candidate	Votes	%	±%
Democratic	G. K. Butterfield (incumbent)	137,667	63.98	+0.24
Republican	Greg Dority	77,508	36.02	+1.19
Turnout		215,175		

== District 2 ==
2004 North Carolina's 2nd congressional district election
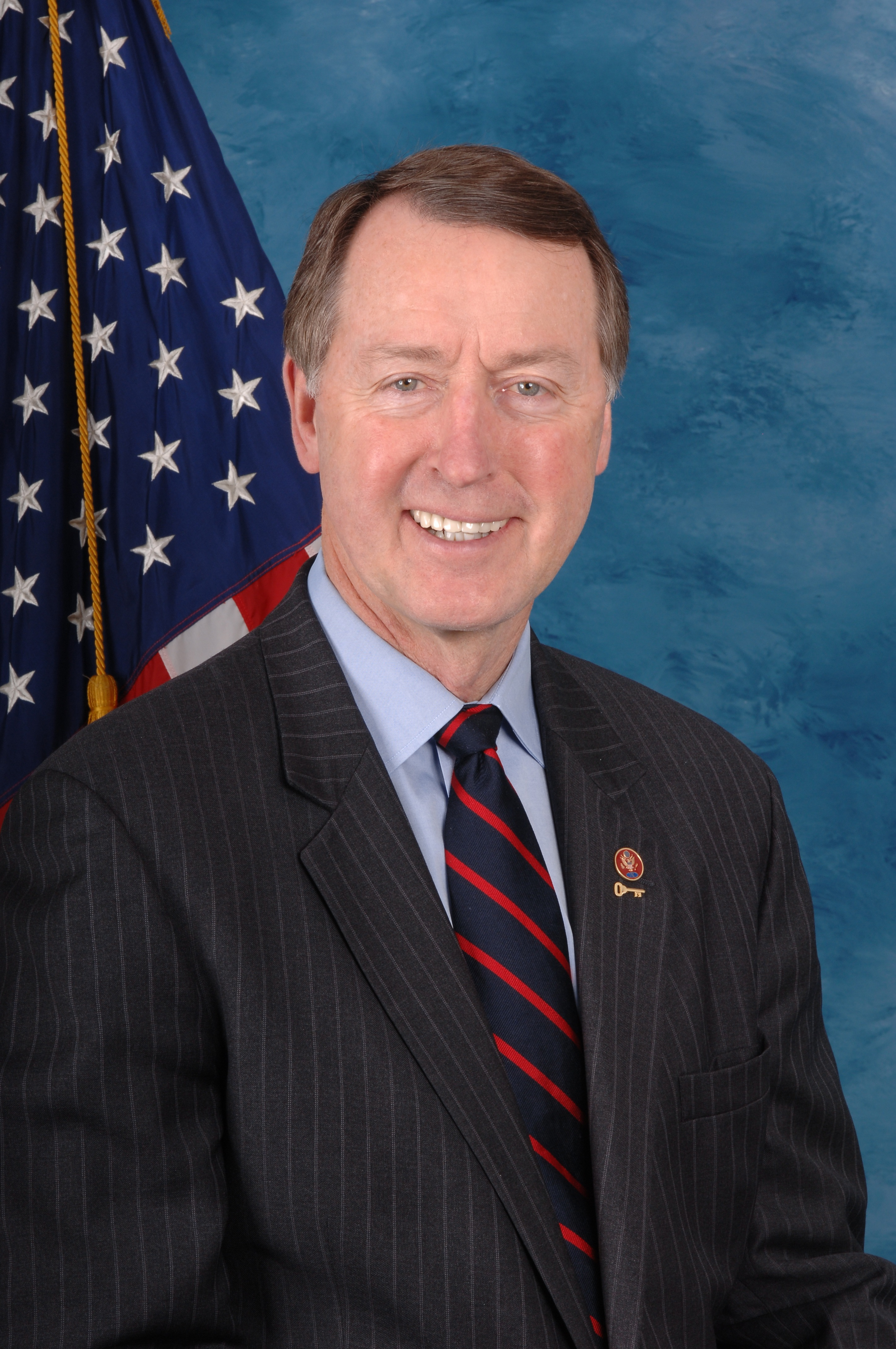

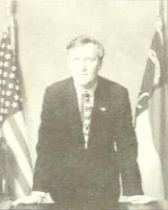
Nominee	Bob Etheridge	Billy Creech
Party	Democratic	Republican
Popular vote	145,079	87,811
Percentage	62.3%	37.7%
- County results Etheridge: 50–60% 60–70% 70–80% Creech: 50–60%
U.S. Representative before election
Bob Etheridge
Democratic
Elected U.S. Representative
Bob Etheridge
Democratic

=== Predictions ===
Source	Ranking	As of
The Cook Political Report	Safe D	October 29, 2004
Sabato's Crystal Ball	Safe D	November 1, 2004

=== Results ===
2004 United States House of Representatives North Carolina 2nd District election
Party	Candidate	Votes	%	±%
Democratic	Bob Etheridge (incumbent)	145,079	62.30	–3.06
Republican	Billy Creech	87,811	37.70	+4.43
Turnout		232,890		

== District 3 ==
2004 North Carolina's 3rd congressional district election
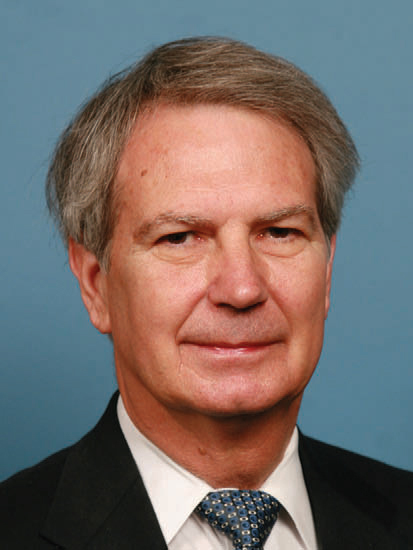

Nominee	Walter B. Jones Jr.	Roger A. Eaton
Party	Republican	Democratic
Popular vote	171,863	71,227
Percentage	70.7%	29.3%
- County results Jones: 50–60% 60–70% 70–80%
U.S. Representative before election
Walter B. Jones Jr.
Republican
Elected U.S. Representative
Walter B. Jones Jr.
Republican

=== Predictions ===
Source	Ranking	As of
The Cook Political Report	Safe R	October 29, 2004
Sabato's Crystal Ball	Safe R	November 1, 2004

=== Results ===
2004 United States House of Representatives North Carolina 3rd District election
Party	Candidate	Votes	%	±%
Republican	Walter B. Jones Jr. (incumbent)	171,863	70.70	–20.00
Democratic	Roger A. Eaton	71,227	29.30	N/A
Turnout		243,090		

== District 4 ==
2004 North Carolina's 4th congressional district election
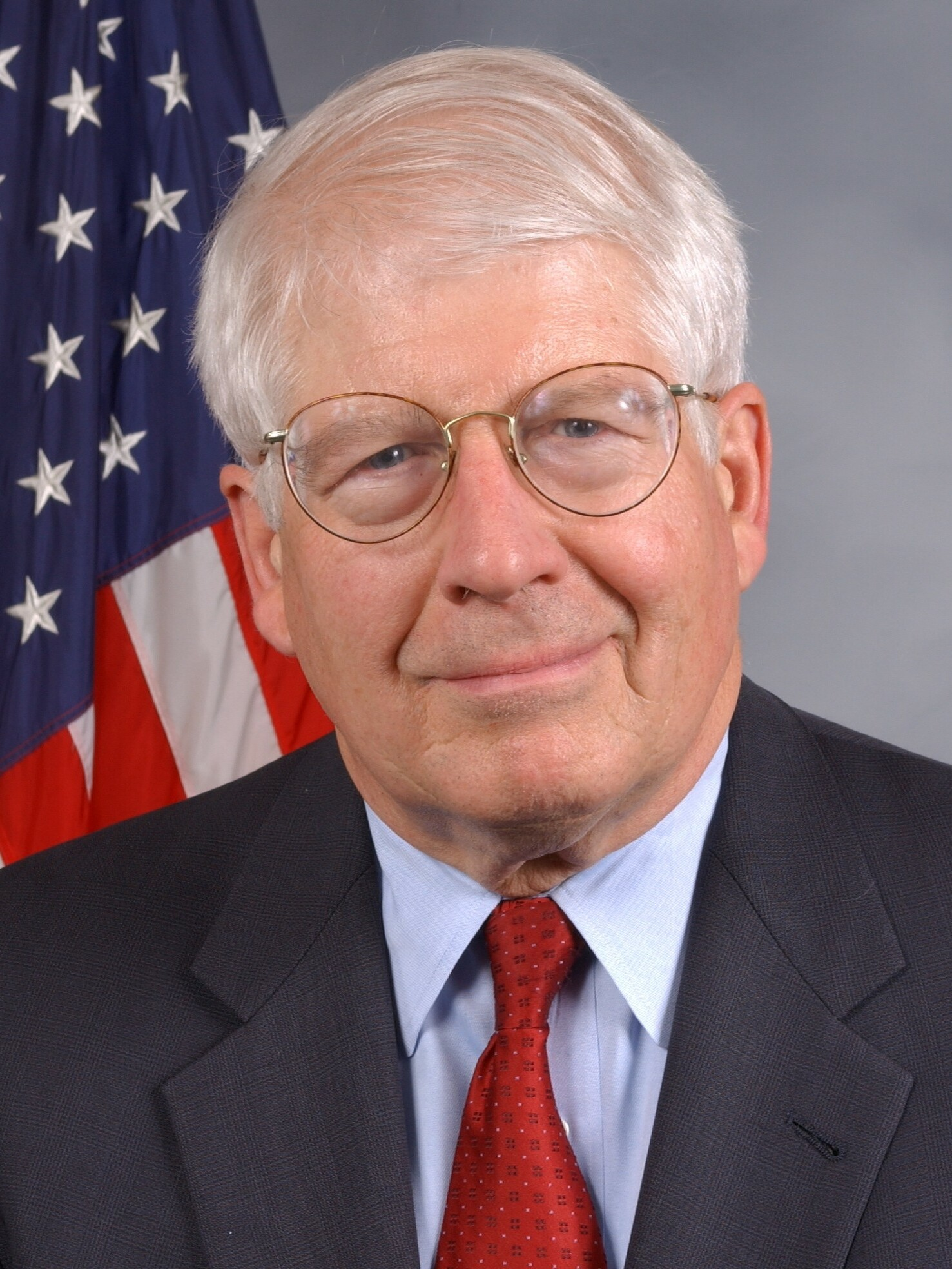
Nominee	David Price
Party	Democratic
Popular vote	217,441
Percentage	64.1%
U.S. Representative before election
David Price
Democratic
Elected U.S. Representative
David Price
Democratic

=== Predictions ===
Source	Ranking	As of
The Cook Political Report	Safe D	October 29, 2004
Sabato's Crystal Ball	Safe D	November 1, 2004

=== Results ===
2004 United States House of Representatives North Carolina 4th District election
Party	Candidate	Votes	%	±%
Democratic	David Price (incumbent)	217,441	64.10	+2.91
Republican	Todd A. Batchelor	121,717	35.88	–0.27
Independent	Maximilian Longley (write-in)	76	0.02	N/A
Turnout		339,234		

== District 5 ==
2004 North Carolina's 5th congressional district election
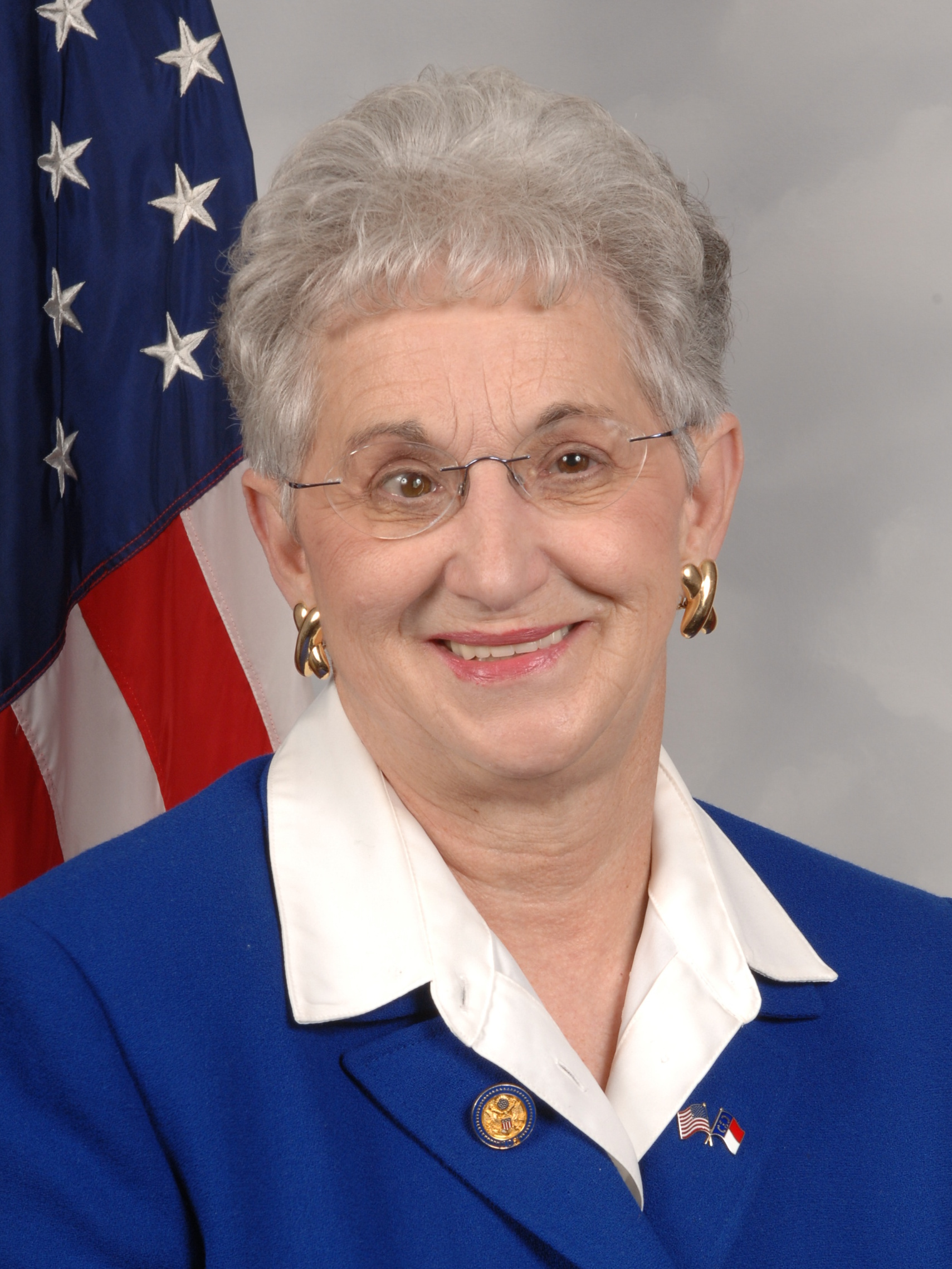

Nominee	Virginia Foxx	Jim A. Harrell, Jr.
Party	Republican	Democratic
Popular vote	167,546	117,271
Percentage	58.8%	41.2%
- County results Foxx: 50–60% 60–70%
U.S. Representative before election
Richard Burr
Republican
Elected U.S. Representative
Virginia Foxx
Republican

=== Predictions ===
Source	Ranking	As of
The Cook Political Report	Safe R	October 29, 2004
Sabato's Crystal Ball	Safe R	November 1, 2004

=== Results ===
2004 United States House of Representatives North Carolina 5th District election
Party	Candidate	Votes	%	±%
Republican	Virginia Foxx	167,546	58.83	–11.36
Democratic	Jim A. Harrell, Jr.	117,271	41.17	+11.36
Turnout		284,817		

== District 6 ==
2004 North Carolina's 6th congressional district election
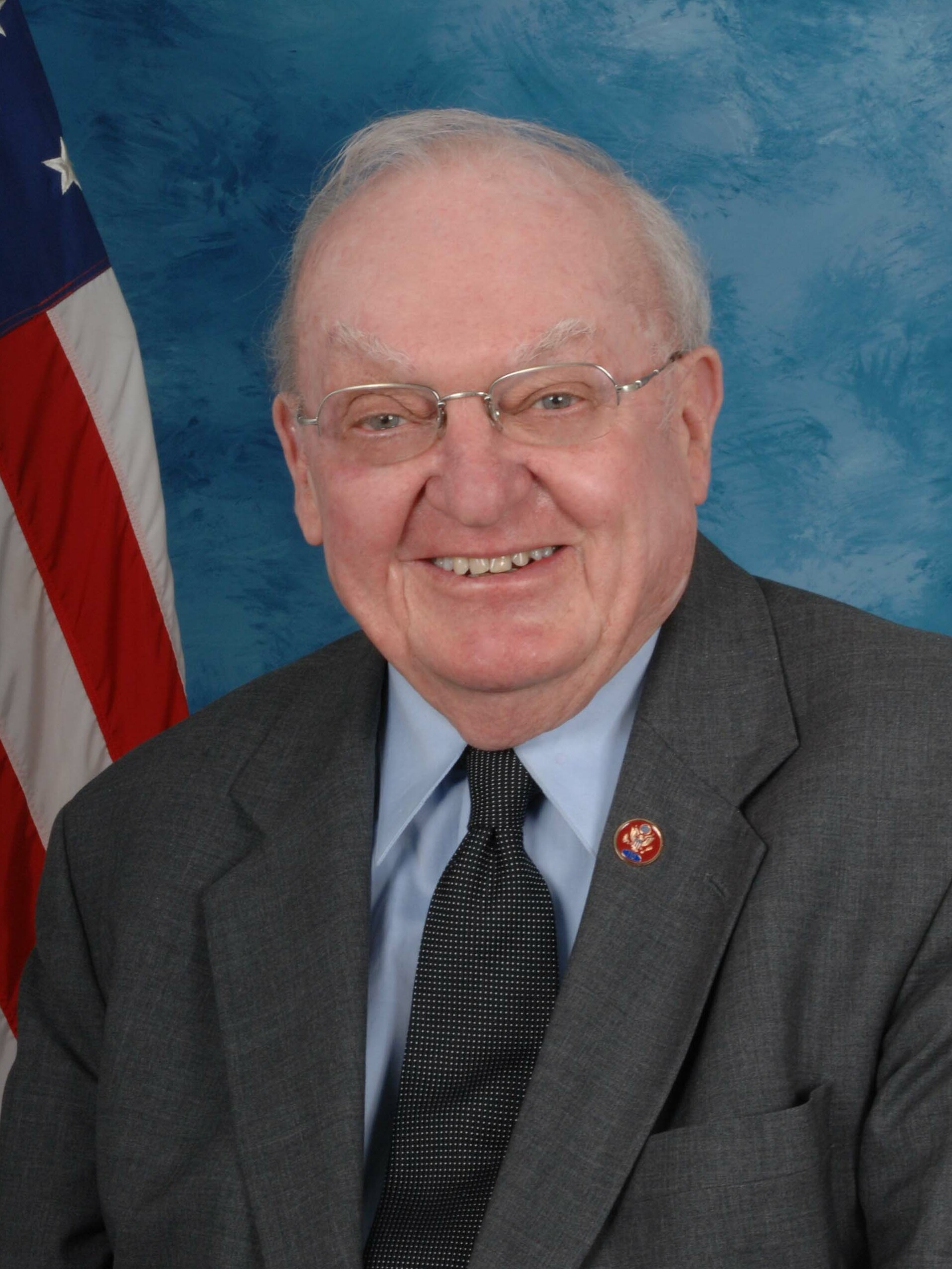

Nominee	Howard Coble	William W. Jordan
Party	Republican	Democratic
Popular vote	207,470	76,153
Percentage	73.2%	26.9%
- County results Coble: 60–70% 70–80%
U.S. Representative before election
Howard Coble
Republican
Elected U.S. Representative
Howard Coble
Republican

=== Predictions ===
Source	Ranking	As of
The Cook Political Report	Safe R	October 29, 2004
Sabato's Crystal Ball	Safe R	November 1, 2004

=== Results ===
2004 United States House of Representatives North Carolina 6th District election
Party	Candidate	Votes	%	±%
Republican	Howard Coble (incumbent)	207,470	73.15	–17.26
Democratic	William W. Jordan	76,153	26.85	N/A
Turnout		283,623		

== District 7 ==
2004 North Carolina's 7th congressional district election
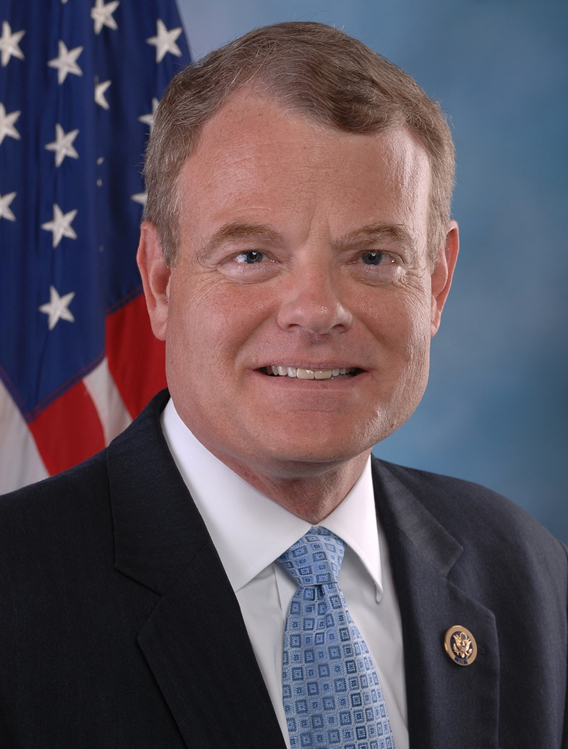

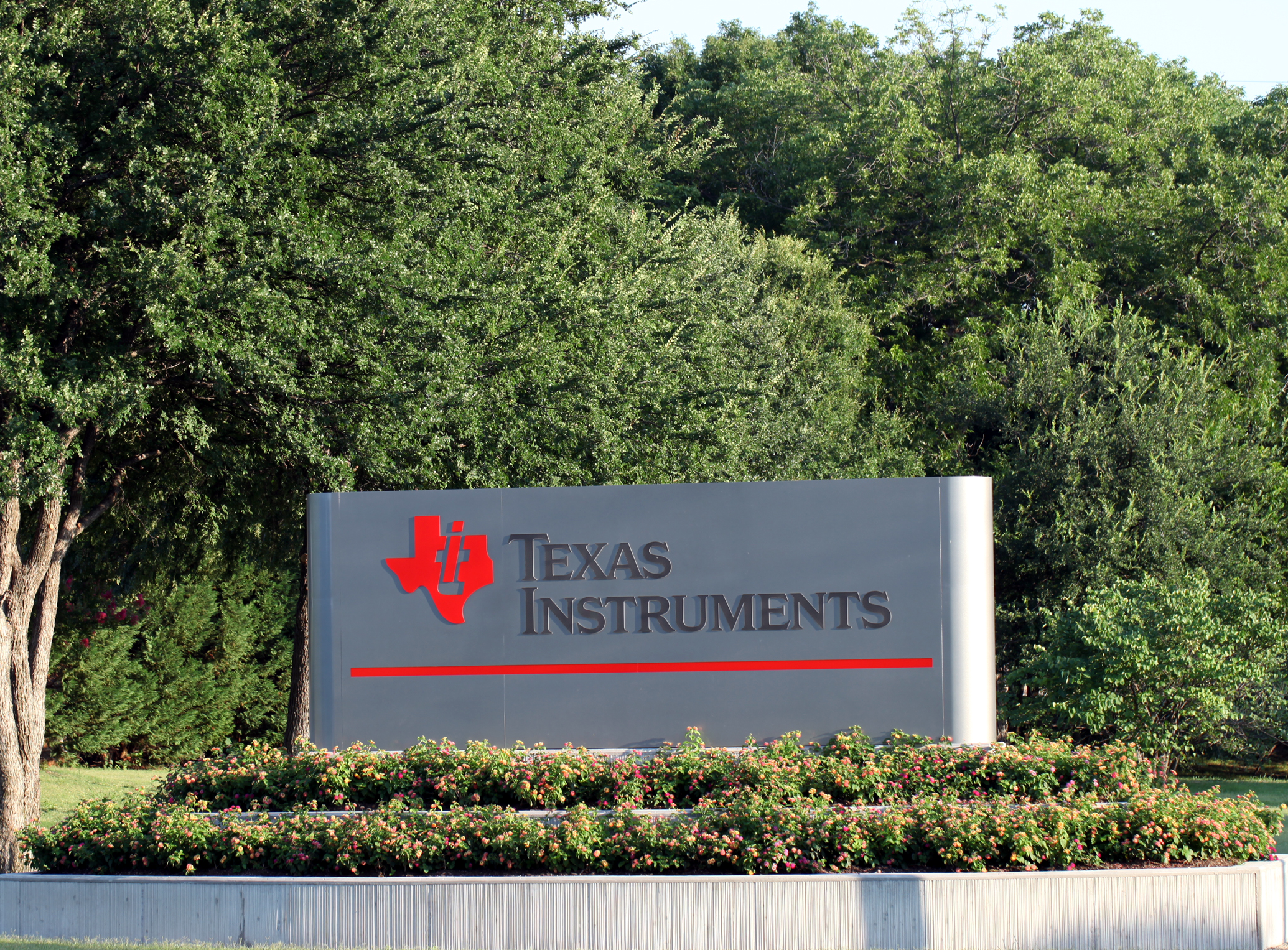
Nominee	Mike McIntyre	James R. Adams
Party	Democratic	Republican
Popular vote	180,382	66,084
Percentage	73.2%	26.8%
- County results Mcintyre: 60–70% 70–80% 80–90% Plonk: 50–60%
U.S. Representative before election
Mike McIntyre
Democratic
Elected U.S. Representative
Mike McIntyre
Democratic

=== Predictions ===
Source	Ranking	As of
The Cook Political Report	Safe D	October 29, 2004
Sabato's Crystal Ball	Safe D	November 1, 2004

=== Results ===
2004 United States House of Representatives North Carolina 7th District election
Party	Candidate	Votes	%	±%
Democratic	Mike McIntyre (incumbent)	180,382	73.19	+2.06
Republican	James R. Adams	66,084	26.81	–0.51
Turnout		246,466		

== District 8 ==
2004 North Carolina's 8th congressional district election
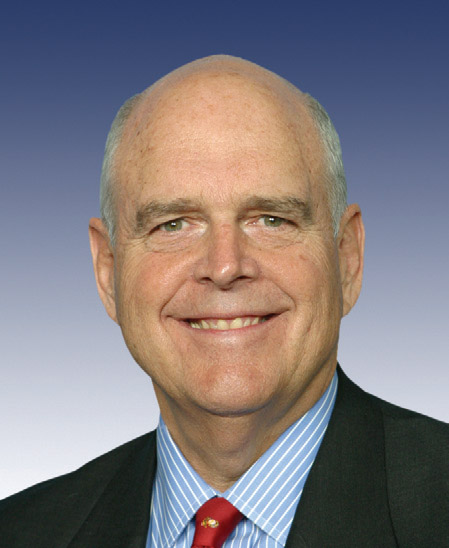

Nominee	Robin Hayes	Beth Troutman
Party	Republican	Democratic
Popular vote	125,070	100,101
Percentage	55.5%	44.5%
- County results Hayes: 50–60% 60–70% 70–80% Troutman: 50–60% 60–70%
U.S. Representative before election
Robin Hayes
Republican
Elected U.S. Representative
Robin Hayes
Republican

The incumbent was Republican Robin Hayes, who was re-elected with 53.6% of the vote in 2002.

The 8th district at this time included Richmond, Anson, Scotland, Hoke , Montgomery, Stanly, and Cabarrus counties along with parts of Mecklenburg and Cumberland counties.

Initially, Wayne Troutman, a prominent Democratic businessman from Cabarrus County considered entering the race, but he decided to withdraw in favor of his daughter, Beth Troutman, a production assistant on the set of The West Wing. Troutman would win the Democratic primary by 45% against Green Party activist Mark Ortiz.

=== Predictions ===
Source	Ranking	As of
The Cook Political Report	Safe R	October 29, 2004
Sabato's Crystal Ball	Safe R	November 1, 2004

=== Results ===
2004 United States House of Representatives North Carolina 8th District election
Party	Candidate	Votes	%	±%
Republican	Robin Hayes (incumbent)	125,070	55.54	+1.92
Democratic	Beth Troutman	100,101	44.46	–0.17
Turnout		225,171		

== District 9 ==
2004 North Carolina's 9th congressional district election
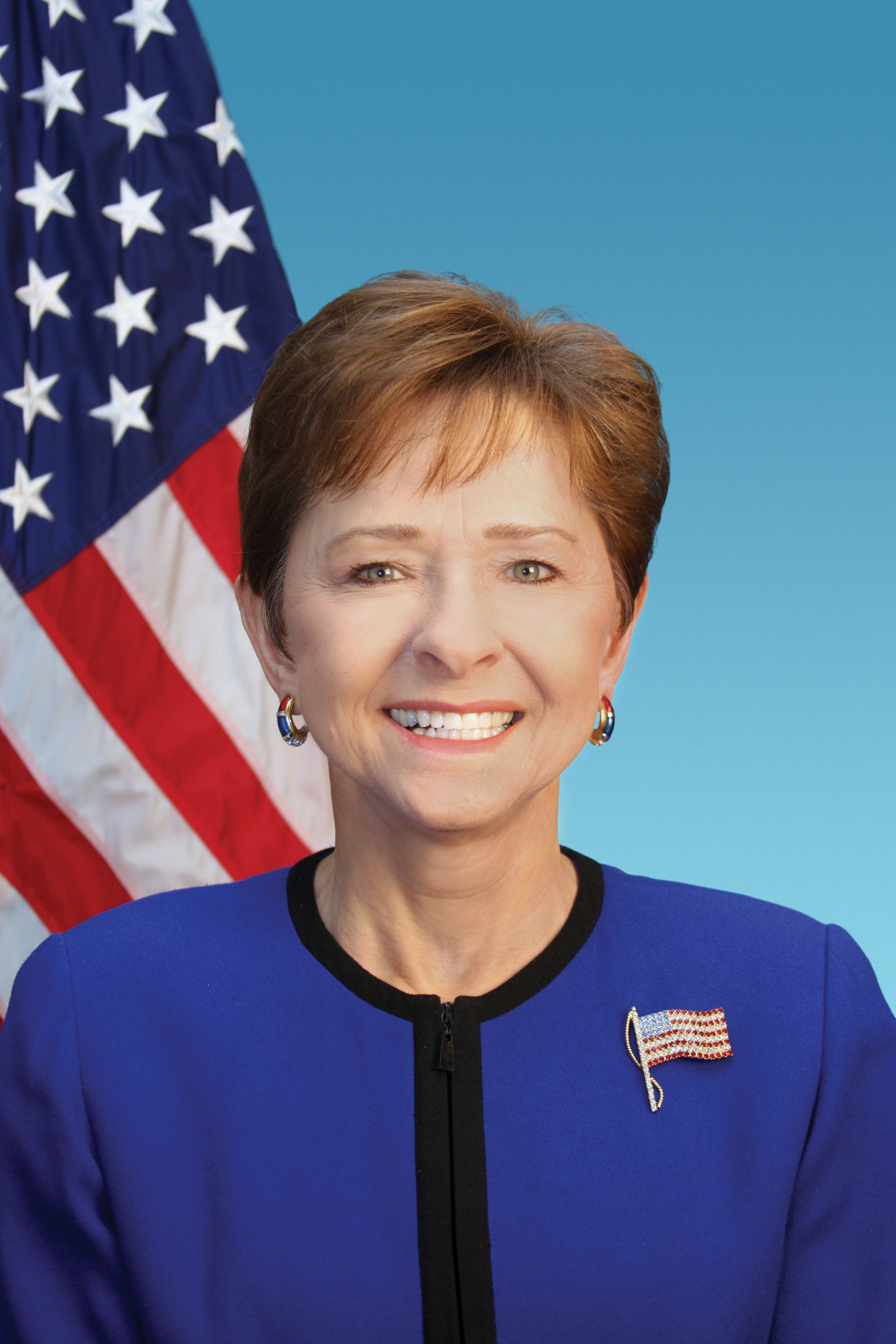

Nominee	Sue Wilkins Myrick	Jack Flynn
Party	Republican	Democratic
Popular vote	210,783	89,318
Percentage	70.2%	29.8%
- County results Myrick: 60–70% 70–80%
U.S. Representative before election
Sue Wilkins Myrick
Republican
Elected U.S. Representative
Sue Wilkins Myrick
Republican

=== Predictions ===
Source	Ranking	As of
The Cook Political Report	Safe R	October 29, 2004
Sabato's Crystal Ball	Safe R	November 1, 2004

=== Results ===
2004 United States House of Representatives North Carolina 9th District election
Party	Candidate	Votes	%	±%
Republican	Sue Wilkins Myrick (incumbent)	210,783	70.24	–2.18
Democratic	Jack Flynn	89,318	29.76	+3.93
Turnout		300,101		

== District 10 ==
2004 North Carolina's 10th congressional district election
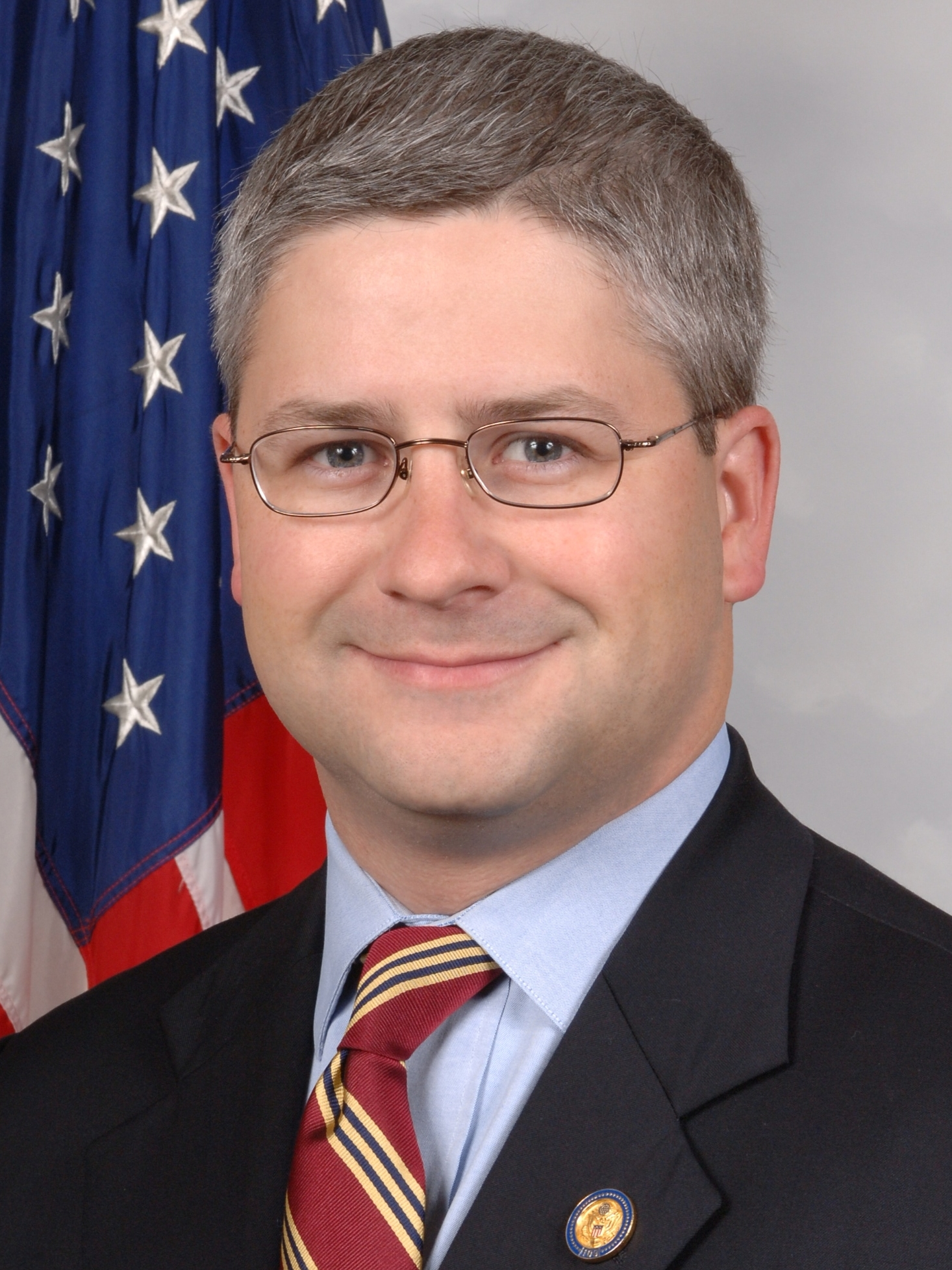

Nominee	Patrick McHenry	Anne N. Fischer
Party	Republican	Democratic
Popular vote	157,884	88,233
Percentage	64.2%	35.9%
- County results Mchenry: 50–60% 60–70% 70–80%
U.S. Representative before election
Cass Ballenger
Republican
Elected U.S. Representative
Patrick McHenry
Republican

=== Predictions ===
Source	Ranking	As of
The Cook Political Report	Safe R	October 29, 2004
Sabato's Crystal Ball	Safe R	November 1, 2004

=== Results ===
2004 United States House of Representatives North Carolina 10th District election
Party	Candidate	Votes	%	±%
Republican	Patrick McHenry	157,884	64.15	+4.85
Democratic	Anne N. Fischer	88,233	35.85	–2.00
Turnout		246,117		

== District 11 ==
2004 North Carolina's 11th congressional district election
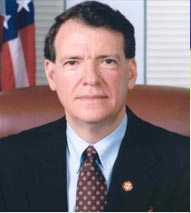

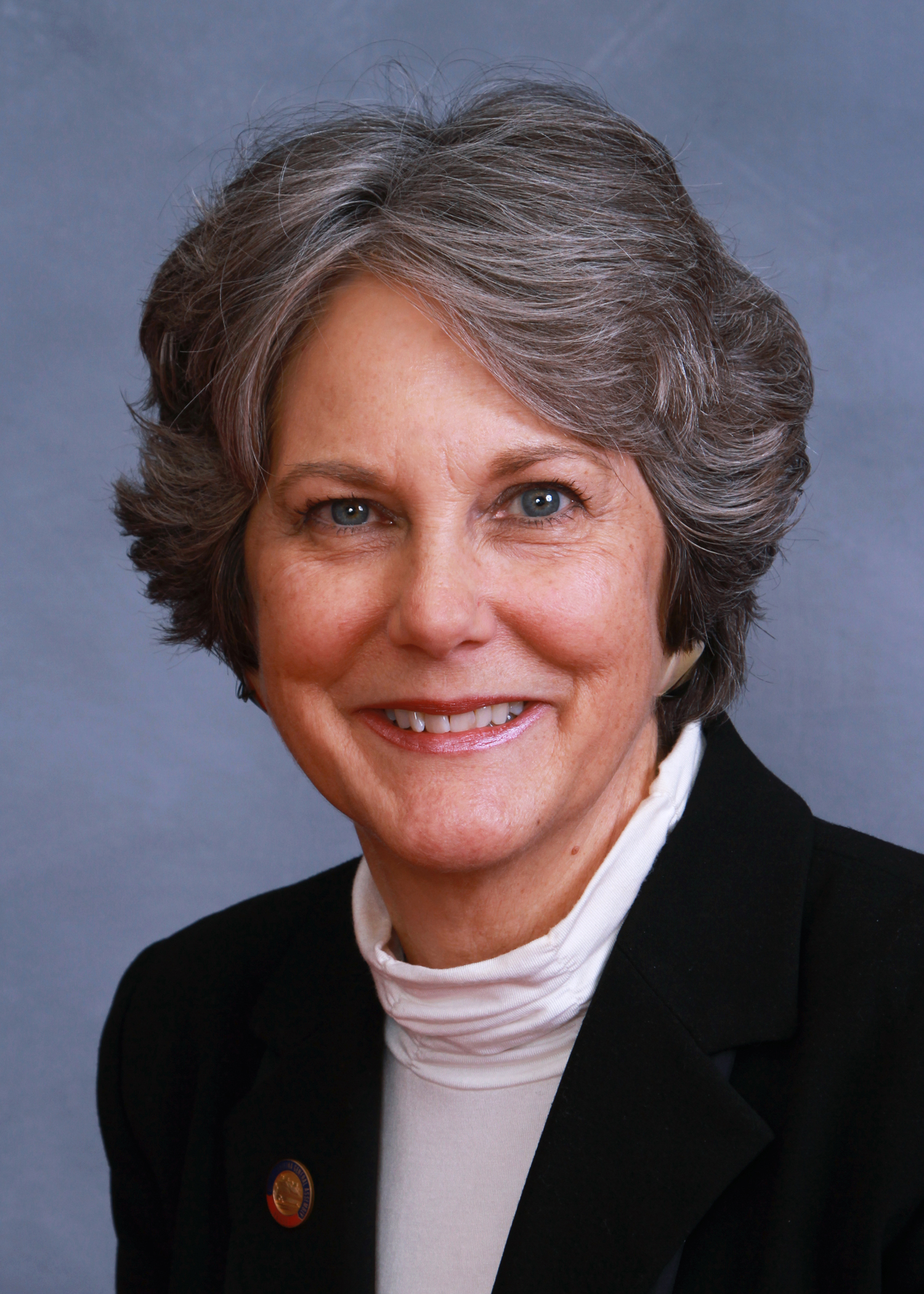
Nominee	Charles H. Taylor	Patsy Keever
Party	Republican	Democratic
Popular vote	159,709	131,188
Percentage	54.9%	45.1%
- County results Taylor: 50–60% 60–70% Keever: 50–60%
U.S. Representative before election
Charles H. Taylor
Republican
Elected U.S. Representative
Charles H. Taylor
Republican

=== Predictions ===
Source	Ranking	As of
The Cook Political Report	Lean R	October 29, 2004
Sabato's Crystal Ball	Safe R	November 1, 2004

=== Results ===
2004 United States House of Representatives North Carolina 11th District election
Party	Candidate	Votes	%	±%
Republican	Charles H. Taylor (incumbent)	159,709	54.90	–0.64
Democratic	Patsy Keever	131,188	45.10	+2.25
Turnout		290,897		

== District 12 ==
2004 North Carolina's 12th congressional district election
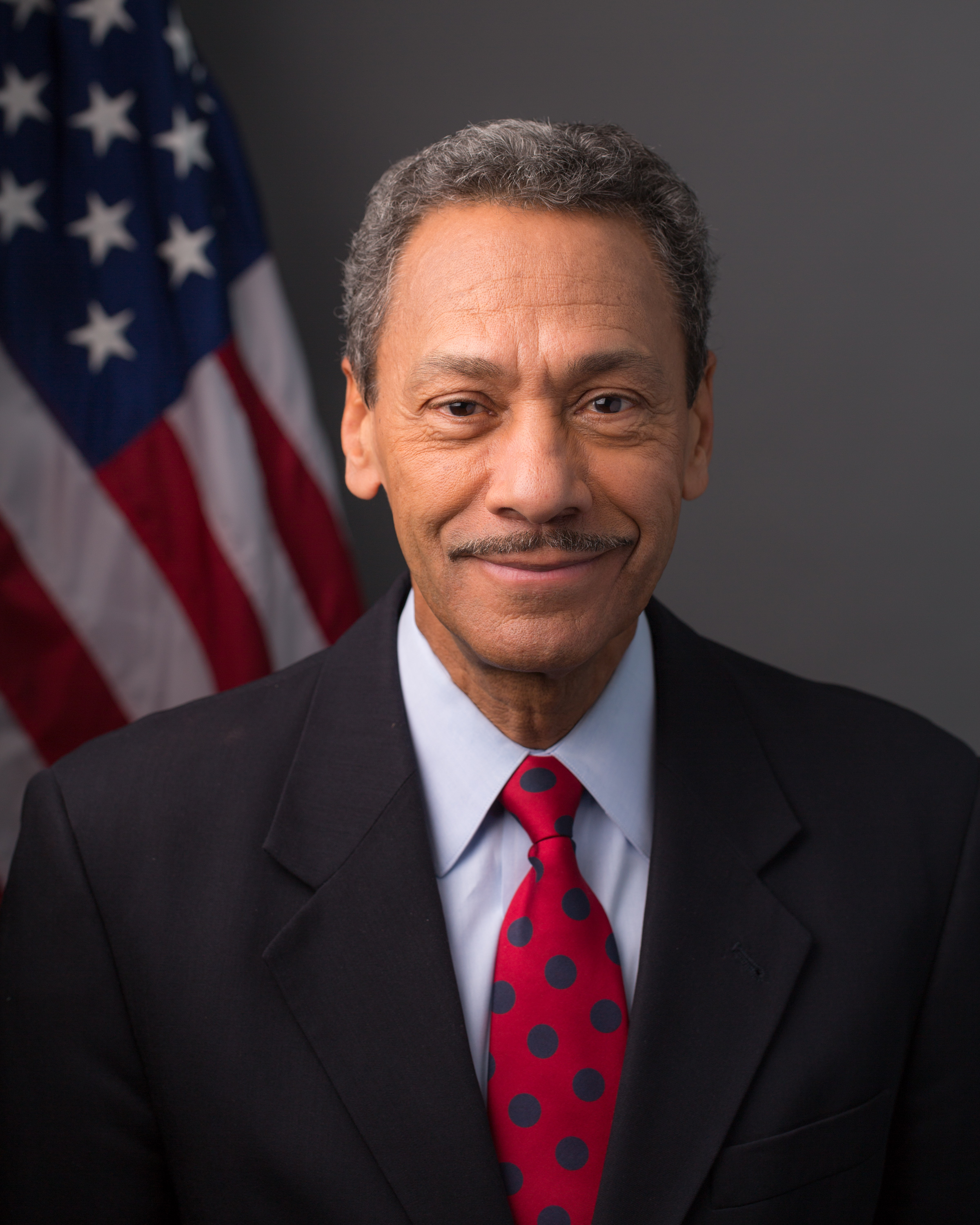

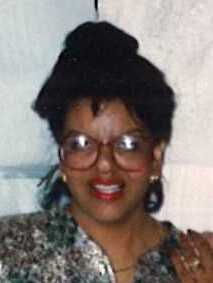
Nominee	Mel Watt	Ada Fisher
Party	Democratic	Republican
Popular vote	154,908	76,898
Percentage	66.8%	33.2%
- County results Watt: 50–60% 70–80% Fisher: 50–60% 60–70%
U.S. Representative before election
Mel Watt
Democratic
Elected U.S. Representative
Mel Watt
Democratic

=== Predictions ===
Source	Ranking	As of
The Cook Political Report	Safe D	October 29, 2004
Sabato's Crystal Ball	Safe D	November 1, 2004

=== Results ===
2004 United States House of Representatives North Carolina 12th District election
Party	Candidate	Votes	%	±%
Democratic	Mel Watt (incumbent)	154,908	66.83	+1.49
Republican	Ada Fisher	76,898	33.17	+0.39
Turnout		231,806		

== District 13 ==
2004 North Carolina's 13th congressional district election
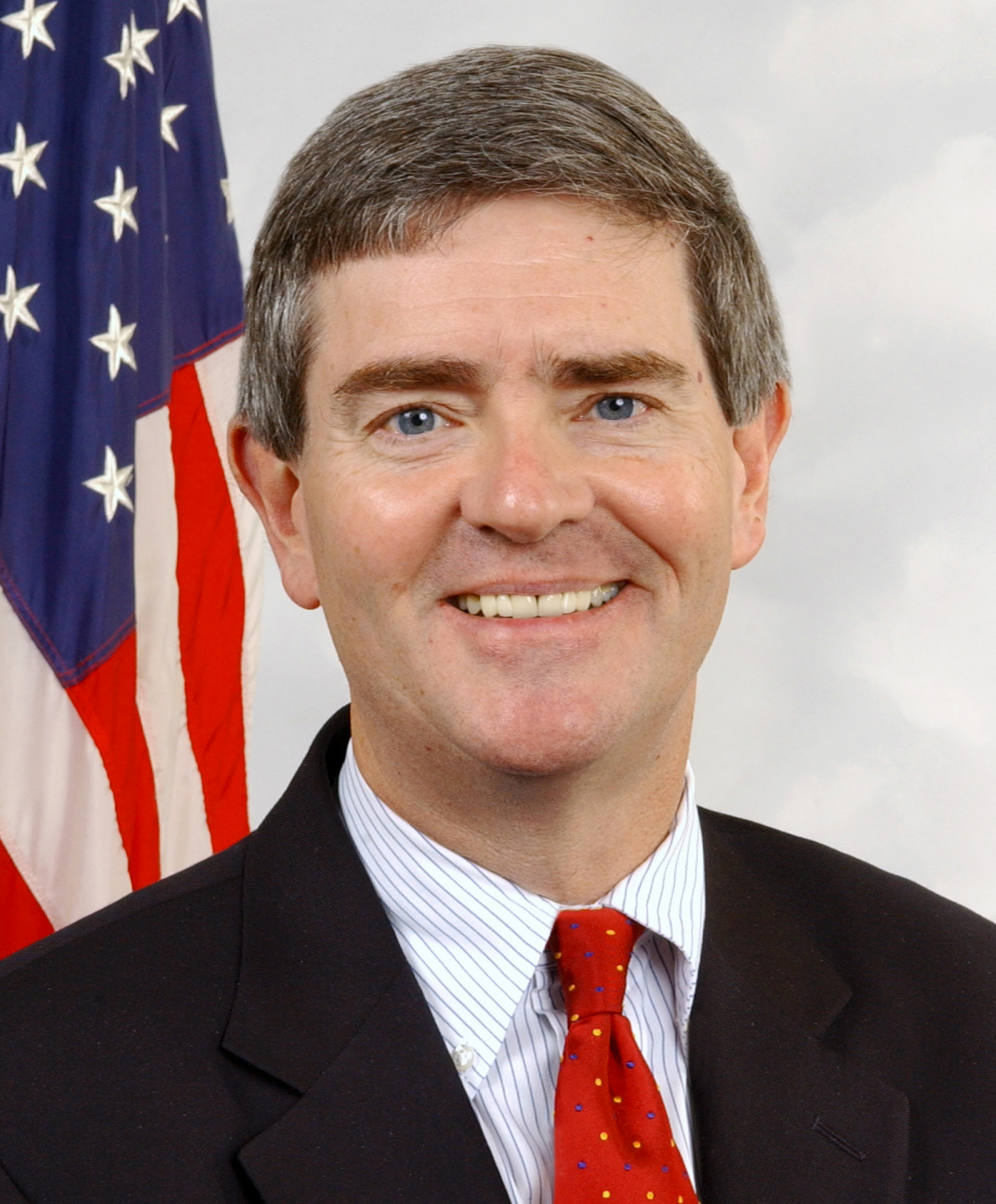

Nominee	Brad Miller	Virginia Johnson
Party	Democratic	Republican
Popular vote	160,896	112,788
Percentage	58.8%	41.2%
- County results Miller: 50–60% 60–70%
U.S. Representative before election
Brad Miller
Democratic
Elected U.S. Representative
Brad Miller
Democratic

=== Predictions ===
Source	Ranking	As of
The Cook Political Report	Safe D	October 29, 2004
Sabato's Crystal Ball	Safe D	November 1, 2004

=== Results ===
2004 United States House of Representatives North Carolina 13th District election
Party	Candidate	Votes	%	±%
Democratic	Brad Miller (incumbent)	160,896	58.79	+4.07
Republican	Virginia Johnson	112,788	41.21	–1.18
Turnout		273,684		
