= Tommy Inns =

English footballer

Personal information
- Full name: Thomas Frederick William Inns
- Date of birth: 30 January 1911
- Place of birth: Plaistow, England
- Date of death: 1987 (aged 76)
- Height: 5 ft 11 in (1.80 m)
- Position: Full back

Youth career
- West Ham Schoolboys

Senior career*
Years	Team	Apps	(Gls)
- Clapton
1933–1936	West Ham United	4	(0)
1936–1938	Millwall	88	(0)
- * Club domestic league appearances and goals

Thomas Frederick William Inns (30 January 1911 – 1987) was a footballer who played as full back.

== Career ==
Inns began his senior career with amateur side Clapton, before signing for Second Division club West Ham United. Inns made his debut for West Ham on 26 December 1933, in a 1–1 draw against Swansea Town. Inns would make three more appearances for West Ham, before dropping down to the reserves. In 1936, along with West Ham teammate Dave Mangnall, Inns signed for rivals Millwall.

On 31 August 1936, Inns made his debut for Millwall, in a 2–0 home win against Queens Park Rangers. Despite missing the opening day of the season two days prior, Inns would go on to play all 47 of Millwall's remaining games, as the club reached the FA Cup semi-finals for the third time in the club's history. Inns' last appearance for Millwall would come on 5 November 1938, in a 1–0 loss against Southampton, during which he ruptured his anterior cruciate ligament, ending his career.
