= Alf Twigg =

English footballer (1882–1957)

Personal information
- Full name: John Alfred Twigg
- Date of birth: 18 August 1882
- Place of birth: Ashby-de-la-Zouch, Leicestershire, England
- Date of death: 1957 (aged 74–75)
- Position: Forward

Senior career*
Years	Team	Apps	(Gls)
1902–1903	Burton Albion	23	(2)
1903–1904	Hinckley Town		
1904–1905	Gainsborough Trinity	32	(16)
1905–1910	Millwall Athletic	182	(88)
- * Club domestic league appearances and goals

John Alfred Twigg (1882– 1957) was an English association footballer who played as a forward.

Born in Ashby-de-la-Zouch, Leicestershire, Twigg began his footballing career with Burton Albion. He also played for Hinckley Town, Gainsborough Trinity, and Millwall where he played from 1905 to 1910. Twigg is Millwall's 5th all-time leading scorer, with 88 goals. He was the top scorer for the Lions in the Southern League three consecutive seasons, scoring 28 goals in 1906–07, 30 in 1907–08, and 17 in the 1908–09 season. Twigg holds the record for the highest number of goals between London rivals, Millwall and West Ham United. Twigg scored 10 goals against West Ham, his first on 16 April 1906 and his last on 26 April 1909.
