= Len Jarvis =

English footballer

- Jarvis with West Ham United

Personal information
- Date of birth: 1884
- Place of birth: Grays, Essex, United Kingdom
- Position: Wing-half

Senior career*
Years	Team	Apps	(Gls)
1903–1909	West Ham United	133	(5)
1909–?	Bury		
- * Club domestic league appearances and goals

Len Jarvis (1884 - unknown) was an English footballer who played as a wing-half for West Ham United and Bury.

== Footballing career ==
Jarvis was signed by manager Syd King for West Ham and made his debut in April 1904 against New Brompton. Little is known of his match-by-match career but he gained attention and press coverage for his foul on Alf Dean of local rivals, Millwall. In a game on 13 October 1906, played at Millwall's North Greenwich ground, Jarvis smashed Dean against a metal advertising hoarding such that Dean was unable to continue playing. His action was investigated by the Football Association and he was banned from playing for fourteen days. After 140 games for West Ham and five goals he moved to Bury in 1909.
