= Billy Bridgeman =

English footballer (1882–1947)

Personal information
- Full name: William Walter Bridgeman
- Date of birth: 12 December 1882
- Place of birth: Bromley-by-Bow, London, England
- Date of death: 1947 (aged 64)
- Place of death: Essex, England
- Position: Forward

Senior career*
Years	Team	Apps	(Gls)
1903–1906	West Ham United	72	(19)
1906–1919	Chelsea	146	(21)
1919–?	Southend United		
- * Club domestic league appearances and goals as of 1 August 2010

William Bridgeman (12 December 1882 – 1947) was an English professional footballer who played as a forward.

== Career ==
Bridgeman was born in Bromley-by-Bow in 1882. He signed for West Ham United in 1903 making his debut in a 4–1 home defeat to Bristol Rovers on 10 October.

Joining West Ham from local side, Adam and Eve FC, Bridgeman scored West Ham's first ever goal at Upton Park in a 3–0 win against Millwall in September 1904. Folklore has it that he scored all three goals in this game although some references show one of the goals being scored by another player, Jack Flynn.

Bridgeman left West Ham in 1906 to join Chelsea, helping them gain promotion to the First Division in 1912. After 159 games with Chelsea he moved to Southend United, where he ended his footballing career.
