= Jimmy Jinks =

English footballer

Personal information
- Full name: James Thomas Jinks
- Date of birth: 19 August 1916
- Place of birth: Camberwell, England
- Date of death: 23 November 1981 (aged 65)
- Place of death: Eltham, England
- Position: Centre forward

Senior career*
Years	Team	Apps	(Gls)
????–1938	Downham Community		
1938–1948	Millwall	45	(16)
1948–1950	Fulham	11	(3)
1950–1951	Luton Town	9	(2)
1951–1952	Aldershot	5	(0)
1952–1953	Ashford Town	18	(16)
1953	Dover		
1953	Snowdown CW		
Total		88	(37)
- * Club domestic league appearances and goals

James Thomas Jinks (19 August 1916 – 1981) was an English footballer who played as a centre forward in the English Football League between 1938 and 1952 for Millwall, Fulham, Luton Town and Aldershot.

He was signed aged 22 by Millwall in October 1938 from Catford League Premier Division club Downham Community for whom he had been a prolific goalscorer – the local newspaper had awarded him a 'Silver Spoon' for scoring two double hat-tricks. He played his first league game for Millwall in the final match of the 1938–1939 season and scored on his debut. League football was then suspended for the following seven seasons owing to World War II, however playing in the wartime 1939–1940 Regional South C League he scored 23 goals between Christmas and mid-March prior to his being called-up for National service. He was a member of the Millwall team that were beaten in the 1945 Football League War Cup South final and also during the war years he appeared as a guest player for West Ham United.

The 1946–1947 season saw the resumption of peacetime league football and now aged thirty he continued playing with Millwall in the second tier of English football – that season with nine strikes from his 22 matches played he was the team's second highest goalscorer (the highest scorer with ten goals had played all 42 league matches). The following season, 1947–1948, in which Millwall finished bottom of the table and were relegated from the Football League Second Division he was the team's joint-second highest scorer with six goals over 22 matches played.

In the summer of 1948 he signed with Fulham playing nine games (with three goals) in the 1948–1949 season in which the team were promoted to the Football League First Division. After playing just two games in the top tier of English football, both during February 1950, in early March he was transferred 'for a substantial fee' to Second Division club Luton Town. In September 1951 after eighteen months at Luton in which he played nine league matches scoring three goals his next club was Aldershot of Football League Third Division South where he played only a handful of matches without scoring.

After a single season with Aldershot at the outset of the 1952–1953 campaign he signed with Kent League club Ashford Town. Although he moved to Kent League title challenging Dover in early April 1953 he was Ashford's joint-highest league scorer for the season with an almost goal a game average of 16 goals from 18 matches. His stay at Dover was short and at the start of the 1953–1954 season he signed with the Snowdown Colliery Welfare club.
