= Peter Reader (footballer) =

English footballer

Personal information
- Full name: Peter Edward Reader
- Date of birth: 8 March 1941 (age 85)
- Place of birth: East Ham, England
- Position: Goalkeeper

Youth career
- West Ham United

Senior career*
Years	Team	Apps	(Gls)
1959–1961	West Ham United	0	(0)
1961–1962	Millwall	1	(0)
- Gravesend & Northfleet

International career
1958–1959	England Youth	11	(0)
- * Club domestic league appearances and goals

Peter Edward Reader (born 8 March 1941) is an English former football goalkeeper.

Reader was born in East Ham and played youth football for West Ham United. There, he played for the winning side in the final of the Southern Junior Floodlit Cup at Stamford Bridge on 14 October 1959 (the final had been deferred from the 1958–59 season), having shared goalkeeping duties with Frank Caskey in previous rounds.

Reader received a total of 11 caps for England at youth level, including the British Youth Championships in the 1957–58 and 1958–59 seasons.

Reader did not make a senior appearance for West Ham and was transferred to Millwall in June 1961. At Millwall, he made a single appearance, against Tranmere Rovers on 11 November 1961. Millwall lost the game 5–1. He went on to join Gravesend & Northfleet, then of the Southern League Premier Division.
