= Gary Bowes =

English footballer (born 1989)

Personal information
- Full name: Gary Tyron Bowes
- Date of birth: 18 October 1989 (age 37)
- Place of birth: Ilford, England
- Height: 5 ft 11 in (1.80 m)
- Positions: Striker; winger

Team information
- Current team: Harlow Town

Youth career
- 2000–2002: West Ham United
- 2002–2004: Arsenal
- 2004–2006: West Ham United
- 2006–2008: Millwall

Senior career*
Years	Team	Apps	(Gls)
2007–2009	Millwall	1	(0)
2009	→ Ebbsfleet United (loan)	2	(0)
2009	AFC Hornchurch		
2009	Leyton		
2009–2010	Salisbury City		
2010	Brentwood Town		
2010–2011	Louletano	17	(1)
2011	Whitehawk		
2011–2012	Cheshunt		
2012–2013	Harlow Town		

International career
2004	England U16	2	(0)
- * Club domestic league appearances and goals as of 18:43, 24 September 2010 (UTC)

Gary Tyron Bowes (born 18 October 1989) is an English footballer who plays as a forward.

He appeared in the Football League for Millwall, and also played in the Portuguese Second Division for Louletano and in English non-league football for clubs including Ebbsfleet United, AFC Hornchurch, Leyton, Salisbury City, Brentwood Town, Whitehawk, Cheshunt, and Harlow Town.

Bowes represented England at under-16 level.

== Career ==
Bowes began his career as a trainee with West Ham United where he stayed for two years. He was the top scorer with 27 goals in his first year and 25 goals in his second year. In 2002 Bowes was bought by Arsenal. He played mostly right wing and striker. Bowes scored 8 goals during the season 2003/2004 while he was playing for England U16 twice.

Bowes was signed by Millwall in 2007. He played mostly striker and became top scorer in reserves with 10 goals. He used his speed to change the game when he came in like during his Millwall appearances '... substitute Gary Bowes injected dangerous pace in the final stages and his good run presented Grimes with what should have been an easy goal...'

Bowes turned professional in January 2008, after playing against Port Vale at age 18, his debut. Shortly later he played a 2:1 Pre-Season Friendly against Ebbsfleet where he scored the winning goal.

In July 2010 Bowes was signed by Louletano, Portugal (II Divisão). In his debut game after arriving in Portugal, Bowes scored the decisive winning goal 1:0 in the semi-final against rival Farense and he and his team won after the final of the Algarve Cup (2:1) against the First Division Team Olhanense. During a friendly between First Division Team Portimonense and Louletano, Bowes scored again the winning goal (1:0). Louletano (with Bowes on the field) remained unbeaten during the Derby against Farense (0:0), the first League Match for Bowes.

Bowes did not score a goal against Desportivo das Aves (Taça de Portugal) in the away Cup win, but the Record stated that his lightning speed changed the game and the game turned when he came in at minute 63 from 1:0 to 1:2.

On 31 October 2010, Bowes scored his first goal of the League.
