= Jack Flynn =

English footballer

Personal information
- Date of birth: 1875
- Position: Forward

Senior career*
Years	Team	Apps	(Gls)
–1901	Walsall		
1901–1902	Bristol City	32	(1)
1902–1904	Reading		
1904–1905	West Ham United	20	(3)
- * Club domestic league appearances and goals

Jack Flynn (1875 - unknown) was an English footballer who played as a forward for Walsall, Bristol City, Reading and West Ham United.

== Footballing career ==
A former player of Walsall, Bristol City and Reading, Flynn joined West Ham United in 1904. He scored on his debut, on 1 September 1904, in a 3–0 home win against Millwall Athletic. It was the first meeting between the two rivals played at the Boleyn Ground. His last game was in February 1905.
