= Luis Suárez (Uruguayan footballer) =

Uruguayan footballer (born 1987)

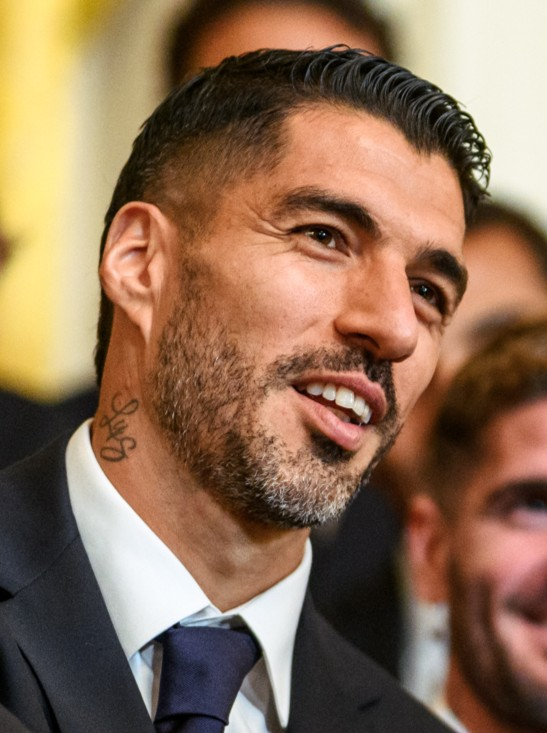
- Suárez at the White House in 2026

Personal information
- Full name: Luis Alberto Suárez Díaz
- Date of birth: 24 January 1987 (age 39)
- Place of birth: Salto, Uruguay
- Height: 1.82 m (6 ft 0 in)
- Position: Striker

Team information
- Current team: Inter Miami
- Number: 9

Youth career
- 1991–1994: Sportivo Artigas
- 1994–2000: Urreta
- 2001–2005: Nacional

Senior career*
Years	Team	Apps	(Gls)
2005–2006	Nacional	27	(10)
2006–2007	Groningen	29	(10)
2007–2011	Ajax	110	(81)
2011–2014	Liverpool	110	(69)
2014–2020	Barcelona	191	(147)
2020–2022	Atlético Madrid	67	(32)
2022	Nacional	14	(8)
2023	Grêmio	45	(24)
2024–	Inter Miami	85	(47)

International career
2006–2007	Uruguay U20	4	(2)
2012	Uruguay Olympic (O.P.)	4	(3)
2007–2024	Uruguay	143	(69)
Medal record
Men's football
Representing Uruguay
Copa América
Winner	2011 Argentina
Third place	2024 United States
- * Club domestic league appearances and goals as of 7 November 2026

Luis Alberto Suárez Díaz (Spanish pronunciation: [ˈlwis ˈswaɾes]; born 24 January 1987) is a Uruguayan professional footballer who plays as a striker for Major League Soccer club Inter Miami. He is regarded as one of the best players of his generation and one of the greatest strikers of all time. Nicknamed "El Pistolero" (lit. 'the Gunman'), individually, he won two European Golden Shoes, an Eredivisie Golden Boot, a Premier League Golden Boot and a Pichichi Trophy. He has scored over 600 career goals and provided over 300 assists for club and country. In addition, he is also one of a select number of players who have amassed over 1,050 career appearances (the first Uruguayan to achieve the feat, since the time matches are recorded).

Suárez began his senior club career at Uruguayan club Nacional in 2005. He signed with Groningen the following year before transferring to Ajax in 2007. There, he won the Eredivisie title and KNVB Cup. In 2011, Suárez signed with Premier League club Liverpool, and won the League Cup in his first full season. In 2013–14, his final season with the club, he equalled the goalscoring record of 31 goals for a 38-game Premier League season, with Liverpool finishing just two points behind Manchester City in the title race. That summer, Barcelona signed Suárez for a fee of £65 million (€82.3 million adjusted for inflation), making him one of the most expensive players.

At Barcelona, Suárez was part of a dominant attacking trio dubbed MSN, alongside Lionel Messi and Neymar. He won the treble in his first season and was the most prolific player in Europe in his second season, scoring 59 goals in 53 matches as Barcelona won the double. He was also the first player ever to simultaneously lead La Liga in goals and assists. In 2020, he signed with Atlético Madrid, where he was awarded the best player in La Liga as Atlético won La Liga in his debut season. Suárez returned to Nacional in 2022 before relocating to Brazilian club Grêmio in the following year, where he was awarded the best player in Série A. In 2024, he joined Inter Miami and won the MLS Cup in his second season.

At the international level, Suárez is Uruguay's all-time leading goalscorer and formerly the highest goalscorer in CONMEBOL FIFA World Cup qualifiers before being surpassed by Messi. He has represented his nation at four editions of the FIFA World Cup and five editions of the Copa América, as well as the 2012 Summer Olympics and the 2013 FIFA Confederations Cup. He was named to the 2010 World Cup All-Star Team and won the 2011 Copa América, where he was awarded Best Player. Suárez has been the subject of many career controversies, including a goal-line handball clearance against Ghana at the 2010 FIFA World Cup, biting opponents on three occasions, accusations of diving, racist incidents, and spitting incidents.

== Club career ==
=== Youth ===
Suárez lived his early years at the Cerro neighbourhood in Salto, where he played youth football at Sportivo Artigas. At age seven, he moved with his family (parents and six brothers) to Montevideo, where he played youth football at Urreta. When he was a child, a car ran over his foot, breaking the fifth metatarsal bone. In spite of the injuries, he continued to play.

=== Nacional ===
Suárez joined local side Nacional's youth team at age 14. At age 16, Suárez headbutted a referee after showing his discontent following a red card, although a sports editor claimed he "accidentally fell into the referee". One night, he was caught drinking and partying, prompting his coach to threaten he would never play unless he started playing football more seriously. In May 2005, at age 18, Suárez made his first-team debut against Atlético Junior in the Copa Libertadores. He scored his first goal in September 2005 and helped Nacional win the 2005–06 Uruguayan league with 10 goals in 27 matches.

Suárez was found by a group of scouts from the Dutch club Groningen when they were in Uruguay to scout another player. As they watched, he won and converted a penalty and scored a "wonder goal" against Defensor. After watching only that match, the scouts approached Suárez and said they wanted to buy him, and after the season, Groningen paid Nacional €800,000 for him. Suárez was thrilled to go to Europe because his then girlfriend, and now wife, Sofía Balbi, had moved to Barcelona; they had maintained a long-distance relationship for a year and he wanted to move closer to her.

=== Groningen ===
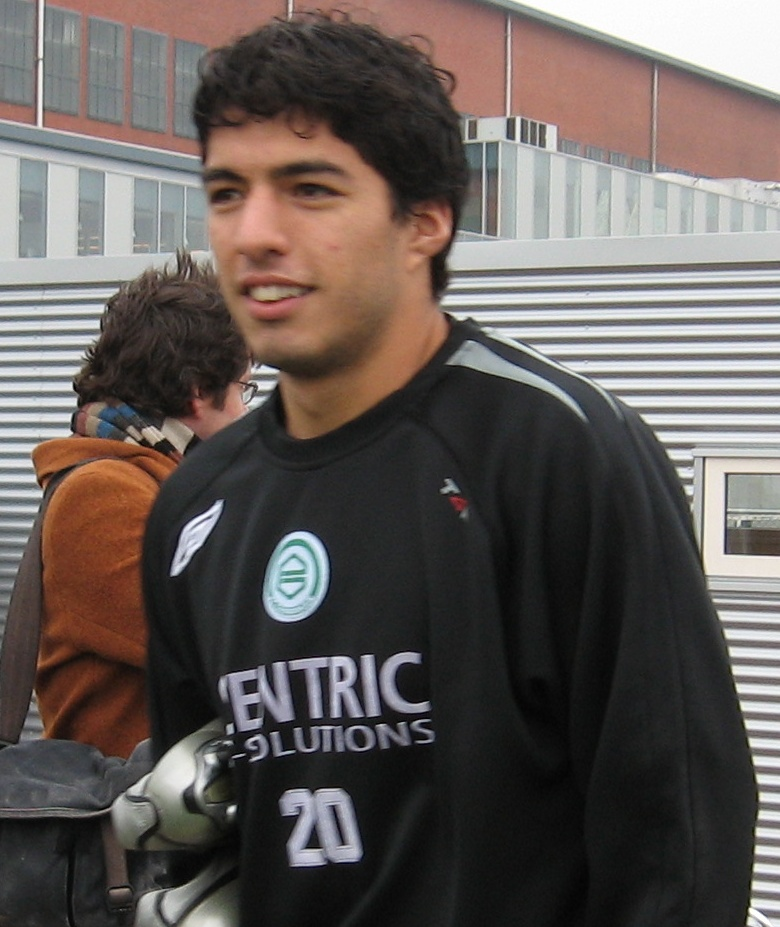
Suárez on the training field of Groningen in 2006

Suárez was 19 years old when he joined Groningen. Initially, Suárez struggled because he could not speak Dutch or English, and he played on the second team to adjust to the Dutch game. His teammate and fellow Uruguayan, Bruno Silva, and his teammate Rùfson, helped him settle into living in the Netherlands and playing for a new team. He worked hard to learn Dutch and his teammates respected him for his efforts with the language. Suárez scored goals for Groningen, but he also had disciplinary problems; in one five-game stretch in January 2007, he scored four goals but received three yellow cards and one red card. Suárez especially made his mark in a 4–3 home win over Vitesse, when with ten minutes to go he subsequently won a penalty and scored two goals. Suárez ended with 10 goals in 29 league appearances to help Groningen finish eighth in the 2006–07 Eredivisie. He also scored in a 4–2 loss to Serbian club Partizan in his European debut on 14 September 2006.

Ajax saw potential in Suárez and offered Groningen €3.5 million for him, but Groningen rejected the offer. Suárez was upset and brought his case to the Royal Dutch Football Association (KNVB)'s arbitration committee to try to facilitate the sale. The arbitration committee ruled against him on 9 August 2007, but that same day, Ajax increased their offer to €7.5 million and Groningen accepted.

=== Ajax ===
==== 2007–09: Development and breakthrough ====
On 9 August 2007 Suárez signed a five-year contract with Ajax, for a transfer fee of €7.5 million, and made his club debut in a UEFA Champions League qualifier against Slavia Prague. He scored one goal in his Eredivisie debut for the club and two goals in his home debut at the Amsterdam Arena. Ajax finished second in the league table in the 2007–08 season and Suárez scored 17 goals in 33 league appearances, setting up a blossoming striking partnership with league top scorer Klaas-Jan Huntelaar.

During the 2008–09 season, Ajax head coach Marco van Basten noted how Suárez played an important role in many of Ajax's goals, but Van Basten was also upset by the number of yellow cards Suárez received. Suárez was suspended for one match because he was given his seventh yellow card of the season against Utrecht in a 2–0 win. He was also suspended after a half-time altercation with teammate Albert Luque over a free kick. Ajax ended the season in third place. Suárez scored 22 goals in 31 league matches and finished second in scoring tables, one goal behind Mounir El Hamdaoui of AZ. Suárez was also named Ajax Player of the Year.

==== 2009–10: League top goalscorer ====
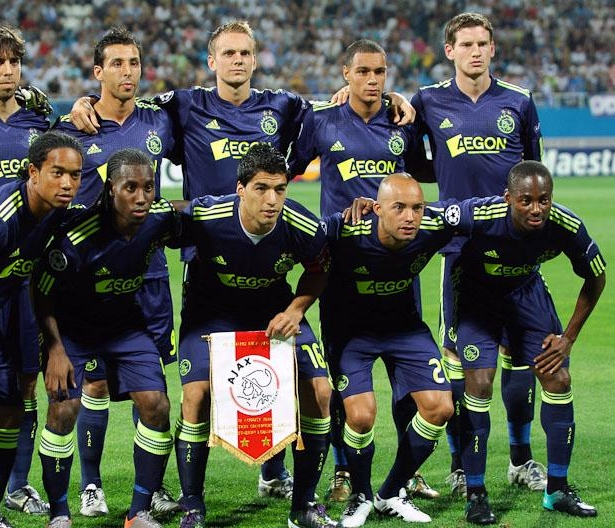
Suárez (with the Ajax pennant) as Ajax captain in 2010. Suárez was named captain in the 2009–10 season.

Before the 2009–10 season, Martin Jol replaced Van Basten as head coach. After the departure of Ajax captain Thomas Vermaelen to Arsenal, Jol named Suárez team captain. Suárez started scoring goals early in the season with a hat-trick in a 4–1 win against RKC Waalwijk. He had a number of multiple-goal matches throughout the season, including four in wins over Slovan Bratislava in the UEFA Europe League play-off round, VVV-Venlo and Roda JC. He scored three in the first half in another win over VVV-Venlo and six against WHC Wezep in the KNVB Cup as Ajax won by a club-record margin of 14–1.

Suárez scored two goals in the second leg of the KNVB Cup final and finished as the tournament's top scorer. Ajax won the Cup final 6–1 on aggregate over Feyenoord, but they finished second in the league behind Twente.Suárez ended the season as the Eredivisie's top scorer with 35 goals in 33 matches, and had 49 goals in all competitions. He was named Ajax Player of the Year for the second straight year and Dutch Footballer of the Year.

==== 2010–11: First biting incident ====
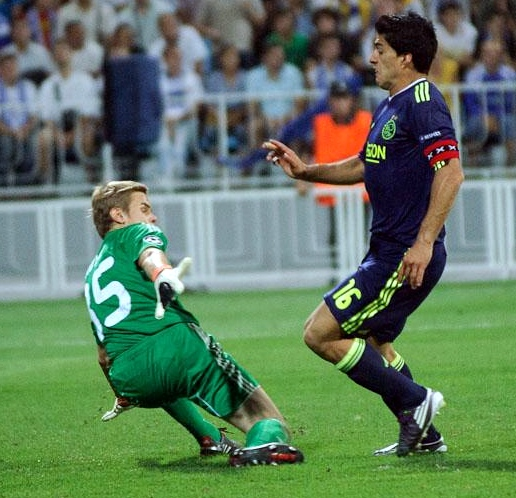
Suárez playing for Ajax in a UEFA Champions League match against Dynamo Kyiv in 2010

Soon after Suárez returned from his World Cup campaign, he scored his 100th goal for Ajax in a 1–1 home draw against PAOK in a UEFA Champions League qualifier. This put him in an elite group of players, including Johan Cruyff, Marco van Basten and Dennis Bergkamp, to score 100 or more goals with the club. Suárez continued his scoring run with a hat-trick against De Graafschap in a 5–0 win.

On 20 November 2010, Suárez bit PSV's Otman Bakkal on the shoulder during a 0–0 draw. Ajax suspended him for two matches and fined him an undisclosed amount, which the club said they would donate to a "good cause". The Dutch daily newspaper De Telegraaf branded Suárez the "Cannibal of Ajax". The KNVB increased Suárez's suspension to seven league matches. Suárez apologized for his actions through a video he uploaded to his Facebook page.

=== Liverpool ===
==== Transfer ====
During the suspension, Ajax were in contact with other European clubs interested in Suárez. On 28 January 2011, they accepted a €26.5 million (£22.8 million) offer for Suárez from Premier League club Liverpool. Despite leaving while suspended, Suárez departed Ajax on good terms, and he was given a farewell sendoff after an Ajax match. During the sendoff, an Ajax coach spoke to him and the crowd and said how the club wished he could stay longer; the crowd applauded their agreement and fireworks followed. Ajax ended the 2010–11 season as Eredivisie champions and Suárez was given a winner's medal for his 7 goals in 13 appearances.

On 31 January 2011, Suárez signed a five-and-a-half-year deal with Liverpool until 2016, and was the club's most expensive signing (£22.8 million) until the arrival of Andy Carroll (£35 million) a few hours later. Suárez requested the number seven shirt, which had been worn by Liverpool legends Kevin Keegan, Peter Beardsley and his new manager, Kenny Dalglish.

==== 2011–12: Early seasons ====
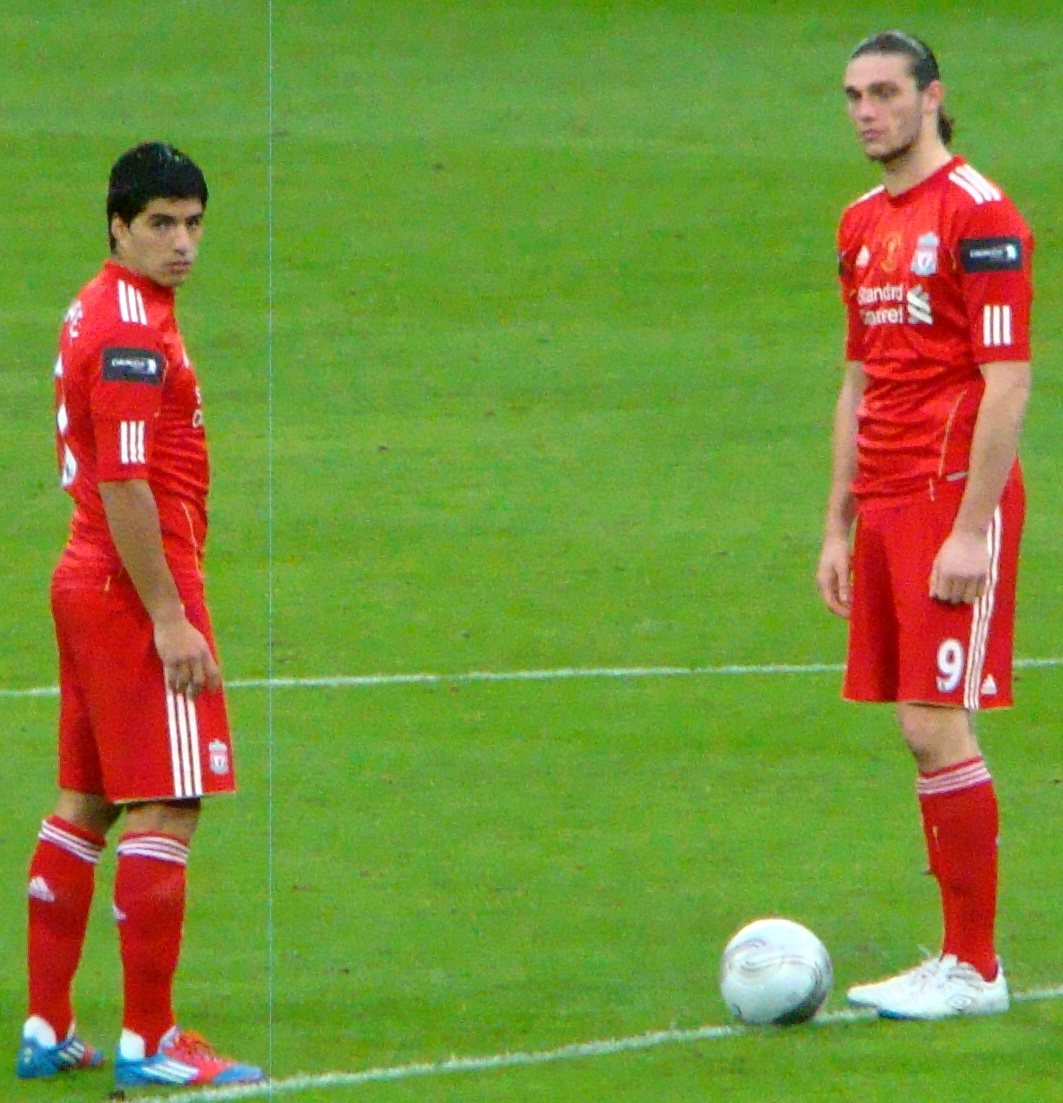
Suárez (left) was signed by Liverpool on the same day as Andy Carroll.

Suárez made his Liverpool debut on 2 February against Stoke City at Anfield in a 2–0 win; he came on as a substitute and scored Liverpool's second goal in front of the Kop in the 79th minute. He was one of Liverpool's best players during his partial season and helped Liverpool go from 12th in the league in mid-January to finish sixth. He finished the 2010–11 season with four goals in 13 games.

After winning the Player of the Tournament at the 2011 Copa América, Suárez had a disappointing 2011–12 season by his standards. Liverpool finished in eighth place and Suárez scored 11 league goals. On 26 February, Liverpool won the League Cup, defeating Cardiff City in a penalty shootout. On 28 April, Suárez scored his first Liverpool hat-trick in a 3–0 win against Norwich City at Carrow Road. He finished sixth for the 2011 FIFA Ballon d'Or.

==== Racial abuse incident ====
The season was marked by an incident in which Suárez was found guilty by a three-man panel from The Football Association (FA) of racially abusing Patrice Evra during a match against Manchester United in October; he was issued an eight-match suspension and a £40,000 fine. Suárez disputed this decision.

After a 1–1 draw against Manchester United on 15 October 2011, Suárez was accused of racially abusing Evra, and the FA opened up an investigation into the incident. Suárez wrote on his Twitter and Facebook pages that he was upset by the accusation and denied the claims. On 16 November, the FA announced it would charge Suárez with "abusive and/or insulting words and/or behaviour contrary to FA rules", including "a reference to the ethnic origin and/or colour and/or race of Patrice Evra". Liverpool later released a statement announcing Suárez would plead innocent, adding they would "remain fully supportive" of him. On 20 December, the FA concluded a seven-day hearing, handing Suárez an eight-match ban and a £40,000 fine for racially abusing Evra.

In their next meeting in February, during the pregame handshakes, Suárez avoided shaking Evra's hand, for which Suárez and Dalglish were later forced to apologise. Suárez was also banned for one match for making an obscene gesture towards Fulham fans.

==== 2012–13: Return and individual success ====
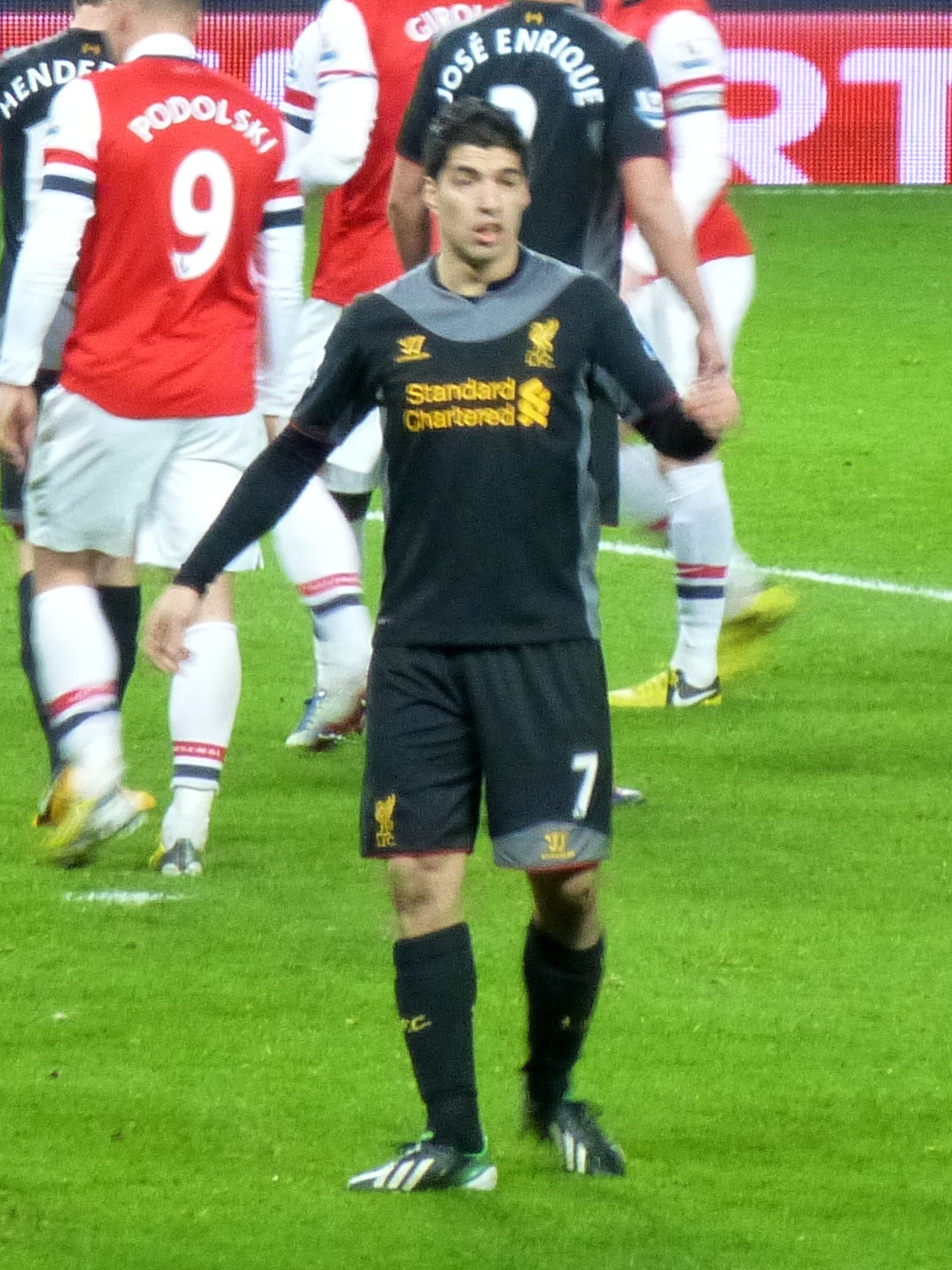
Suárez playing for Liverpool against Arsenal in January 2013

On 7 August 2012, Suárez signed a new long-term contract with Liverpool. On 26 August, he scored his first goal of the 2012–13 season in a 2–2 draw with champions Manchester City at Anfield. On 29 September 2012, Suárez scored a hat-trick in Liverpool's Premier League fixture away at Norwich City for the second consecutive season.

On 6 January 2013, Suárez handled the ball before scoring the decisive goal in Liverpool's 2–1 win over Mansfield Town from the Conference National in an FA Cup third round match. Liverpool's manager Brendan Rodgers defended his player by claiming "it's not his job to own up", while Mansfield manager Paul Cox said he felt "a little bit gutted" by the "instinctive" handball, but admitted he would have accepted a goal scored like that by one of his players.

On 19 January, Suárez scored his seventh goal in three matches against Norwich, as Liverpool cruised to a 5–0 home league victory. The following week, Suárez captained Liverpool for the first time for the FA Cup fourth round match against Oldham Athletic; Liverpool lost 2–3. On 2 March, Suárez scored a hat-trick against Wigan Athletic, leading Liverpool to a dominant 4–0 victory at the DW Stadium. In so doing, he became only the third Liverpool player to score 20 Premier League goals in a single season after Robbie Fowler and Fernando Torres. On 10 March, Suárez scored his 50th goal in all competitions since joining the Reds by scoring the opener in a 3–2 home victory over Tottenham Hotspur, ending Spurs' 12-match unbeaten run. He was also named man of the match for his performance after he won the decisive penalty which Steven Gerrard converted.

At the end of the season, Suárez was one of six players named on the shortlist for PFA Players' Player of the Year. Suárez finished second in the final ballot behind Gareth Bale of Tottenham and was named in the PFA Team of the Year. He was second-top goalscorer in the Premier League for 2012–13 with 23 goals and Liverpool's top scorer in all competitions with 30 goals. On 28 May 2013, he was named as Liverpool's player of the season after receiving 64% of votes in a poll of the club's supporters.

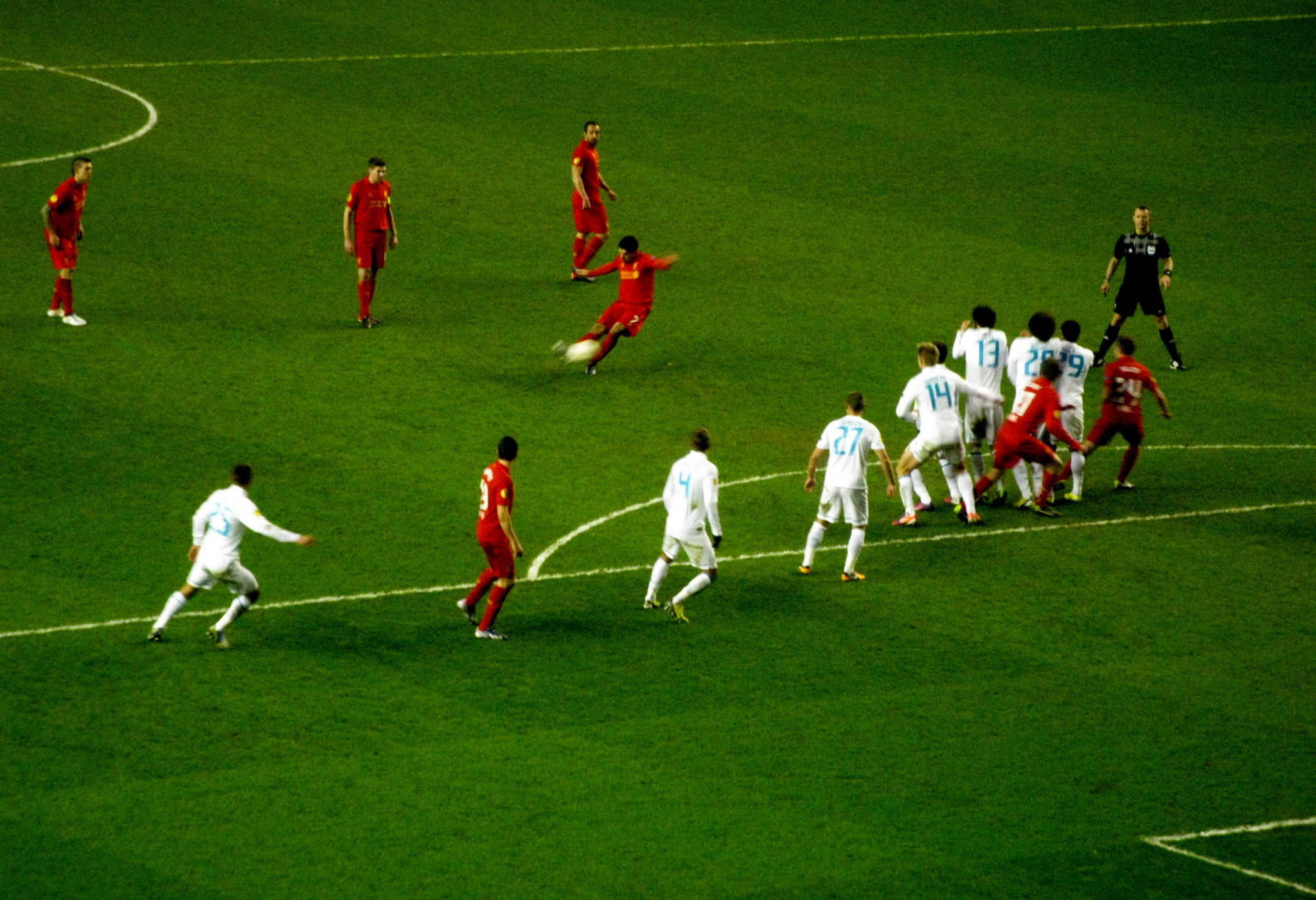
Suárez about to score a 35-yard free kick against Zenit Saint Petersburg, his second goal in a 3–1 win, March 2013

==== Second biting incident ====
On 21 April 2013, during a 2–2 draw with Chelsea in a Premier League match at Anfield, Suárez bit Branislav Ivanović; this was the second time Suárez had bitten an opponent. It was not noticed by the officials, and Suárez scored an equalizer in injury time. The bite prompted UK Prime Minister David Cameron to call on the FA to take a hard line with Suárez: the FA charged him with violent conduct and he was fined an undisclosed sum by his club. Contrary to claims from Suárez, Ivanović did not accept an apology. Suárez accepted the violent conduct charge but denied the FA's claim the standard punishment of three matches was clearly insufficient for his offence. A three-man independent panel appointed by the FA decided on a ten-game ban for Suárez, who did not appeal the ban; the panel criticized Suárez for not appreciating "the seriousness" of the incident when he argued against a long ban. The panel also wanted to send a "strong message that such deplorable behaviours do not have a place in football", while noting that "all players in the higher level of the game are seen as role models, have the duty to act professionally and responsibly, and set the highest example of good conduct to the rest of the game – especially to young players".

On 31 May 2013, Suárez said he would be seeking an exit from Liverpool in the summer, citing excessive media attention on his family as a reason for wanting to leave. On 6 August, after Liverpool had rejected a bid of £40,000,001 for the player from Arsenal, Suárez reiterated his wish to leave Liverpool and said Liverpool had previously promised to allow him a transfer if the club failed to qualify for the 2013–14 UEFA Champions League. The following day, Liverpool manager Brendan Rodgers said Liverpool had not broken any promises to Suárez and that the player had shown "total disrespect" for the club. After this incident, the British press reported that Suárez had been instructed to train away from the Liverpool first-team squad by Rodgers. On 8 August, Liverpool owner John W. Henry stated that Suárez would not be allowed to leave the club.

==== 2013–14: European Golden Shoe and departure ====
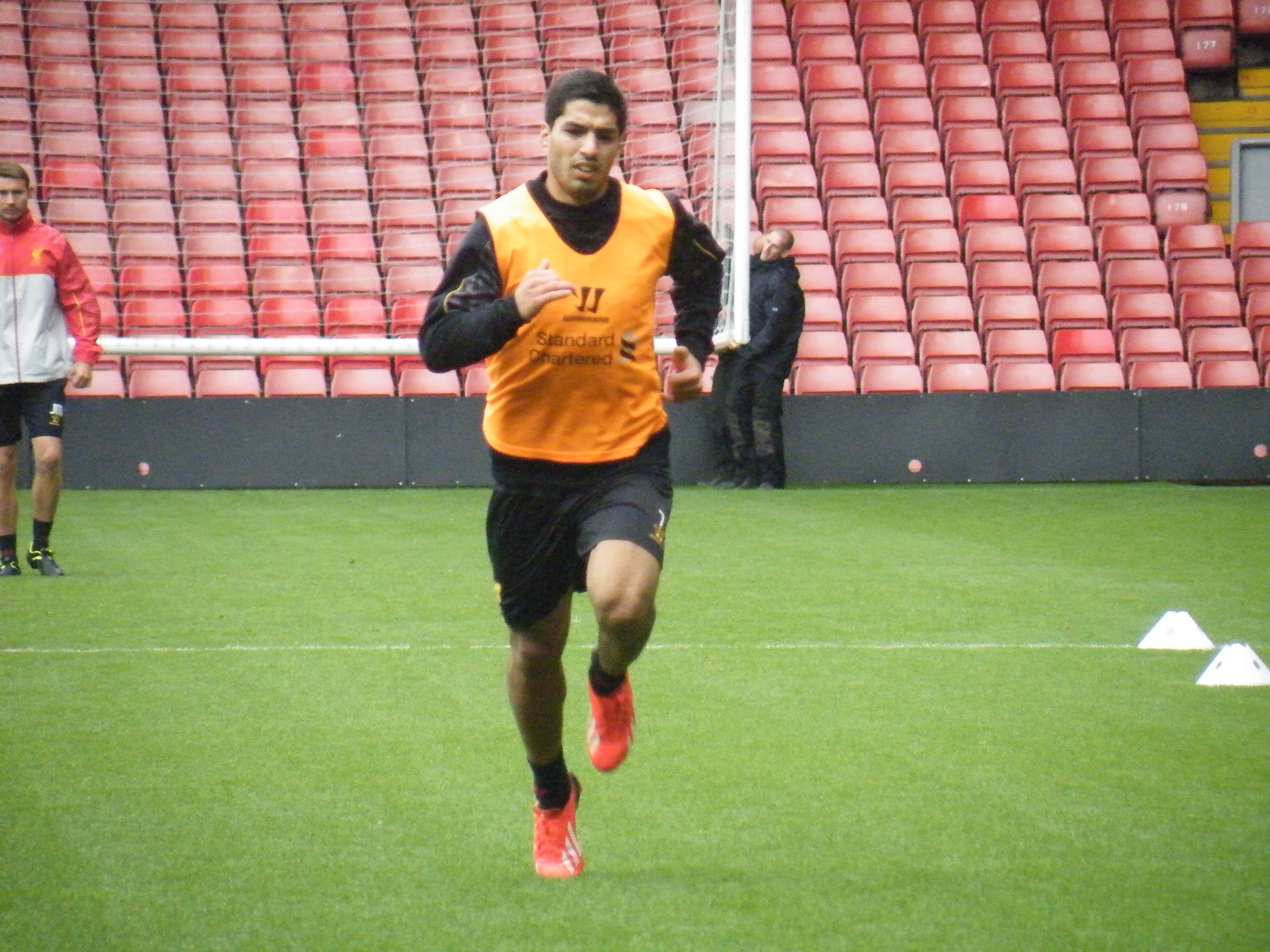
Suárez during an open training session at Anfield in August 2013

On 14 August, Suárez reversed his position about wanting to leave the club, with reports stating he wanted to stay at the club and that he was possibly going to sign a contract extension, citing the support from Liverpool supporters as the reason for his unexpected turnaround. Suárez returned to first-team training two days later after "offer[ing] contrition" to his teammates but reportedly not apologizing to his manager. On 25 September, Suárez returned to the Liverpool team after his suspension to make his first appearance of the 2013–14 season in a League Cup third round tie against Manchester United at Old Trafford, losing 1–0. On 29 September, Suárez made his first Premier League appearance of the season, scoring twice as Liverpool defeated Sunderland 3–1 at the Stadium of Light. On 26 October, he scored his fourth Premier League hat-trick, his first at Anfield, in a 4–1 defeat of West Bromwich Albion.

On 4 December, Suárez scored four goals against Norwich City in a 5–1 home win. He became the first player in Premier League history to score three hat-tricks against the same club, and took his scoring record against Norwich to 11 goals in 5 matches. On 15 December, Suárez captained Liverpool for the first time in a Premier League match against Tottenham Hotspur. He both scored and assisted twice as the team recorded a 5–0 win at White Hart Lane to close the gap on league leaders Arsenal to two points. The following day, Suárez was named the Football Supporters' Federation Player of the Year for 2013. On 20 December, Suárez signed a new four-and-a-half-year contract with Liverpool.

On 1 January 2014, by scoring in a 2–0 home win over Hull City, Suárez became the first Liverpool player to score 20 or more goals in successive Premier League seasons since Robbie Fowler in 1994–95 and 1995–96. He equaled Andy Cole's Premier League record for the earliest date to reach the 20-goal mark, but set a new record low of 15 matches. His strike partnership this season with Daniel Sturridge earned them the nickname "SAS", i.e., Sturridge and Suárez.

On 1 March, Suárez made his 100th Premier League appearance, scoring in a 3–0 win over Southampton at St Mary's Stadium. In the following fixture, he scored his 25th league goal of the season as Liverpool defeated Manchester United at Old Trafford for the first time since 2009 by a convincing three-goal margin. On 22 March, Suárez scored his sixth Premier League hat-trick, and third of the season, in a 6–3 win over Cardiff City at the Cardiff City Stadium. On 30 March, he broke Robbie Fowler's club record of 28 goals in a Premier League season in a 4–0 home win against Tottenham which took Liverpool top of the league with six matches remaining. On 20 April, he scored in a 3–2 win at Norwich to become the first Liverpool player to score 30 league goals in a season since Ian Rush in 1986–87. This also made him the seventh player to score 30 goals in a Premier League season, following Andy Cole, Alan Shearer, Kevin Phillips, Thierry Henry, Cristiano Ronaldo and Robin van Persie.

On 18 April, Suárez was named as one of the six players nominated for the PFA Player of the Year award for the second consecutive season. On 27 April, he won the award, becoming the first non-European to win the award. On 5 May 2014, Suárez was named as the Football Association Writers Player of the Year. He finished the season with 31 goals in 33 matches, winning the Premier League Golden Boot, with Sturridge as runner-up, as Liverpool came second in the league and returned to the UEFA Champions League. Suárez also won the Barclay's Premier League Player of the Season award. As the Premier League's top scorer with 31 goals, he also shared the European Golden Shoe with Cristiano Ronaldo.

=== Barcelona ===
==== Signing and suspension ====
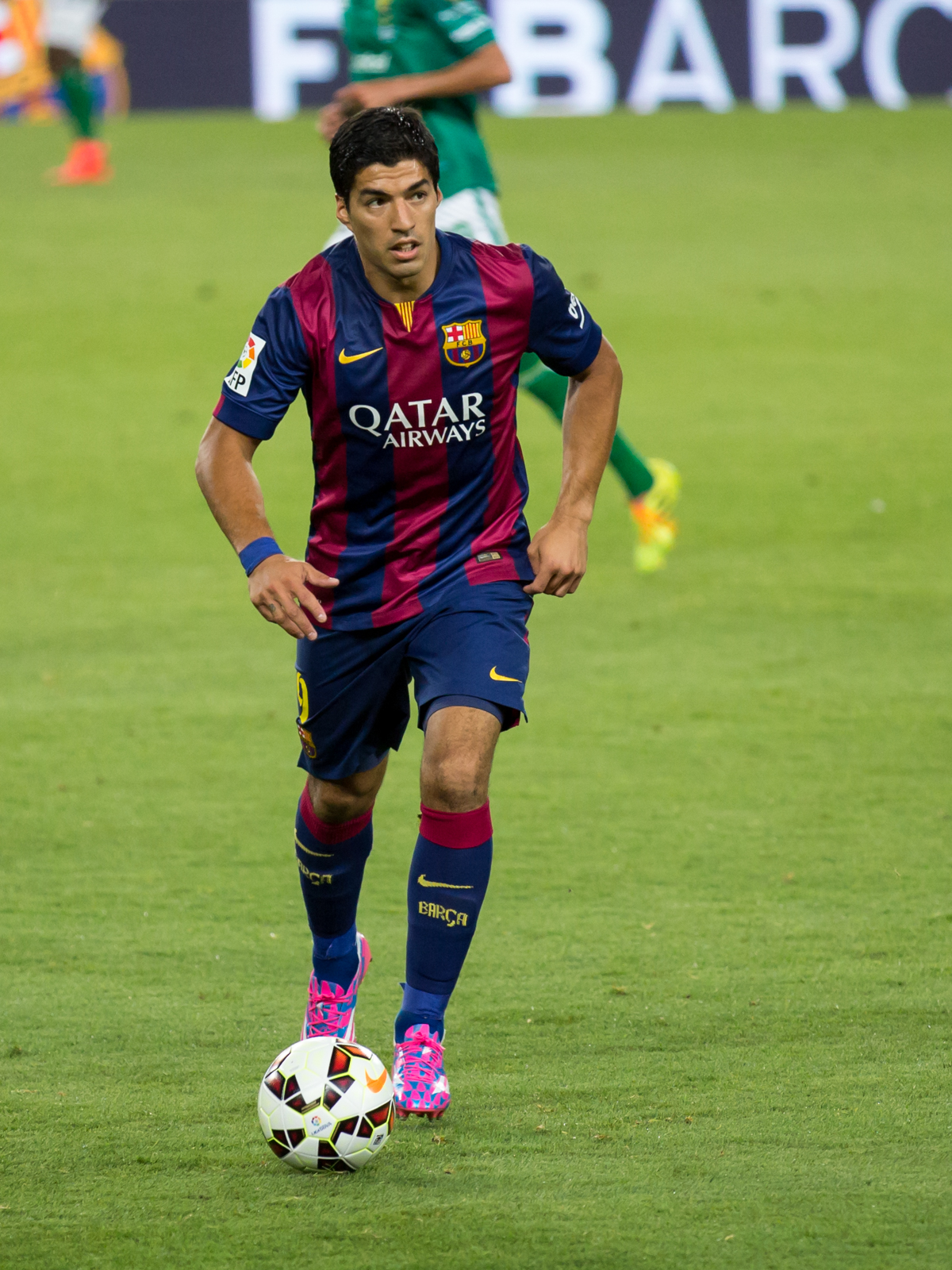
Suárez making his Barcelona debut against Club León in August 2014. After serving his four-month suspension for biting at the 2014 World Cup he made his competitive debut for the club on 25 October.

On 11 July 2014, Suárez agreed with Barcelona on a five-year contract for an undisclosed transfer fee, however, according to a leaked document by Football Leaks, the fee was £64.98 million (€82.3 million adjusted for inflation), making him one of the most expensive players in world football history. Barça confirmed Suárez would wear the number 9 shirt for the 2014–15 season.

Suárez missed the first part of the season after being found guilty of biting Italian player Giorgio Chiellini at the 2014 FIFA World Cup. As part of the suspension, he was banned from all "football-related activities", including training for Barcelona, for four months (until 26 October). He was also banned from entering any stadium, even as a spectator, during the same period. On 24 July, Suárez and his lawyers filed an appeal with the Court of Arbitration for Sport (CAS) and requested the sanctions be reduced or the suspension to be lifted. The parties were heard at a hearing at the CAS offices in Lausanne, Switzerland, on 8 August. Six days later, the CAS confirmed the ban imposed by FIFA against Suárez, who remained suspended from football for four months, as well as a nine-match ban in internationals, the first of which was served in Uruguay's round of 16 match against Colombia in the 2014 World Cup. However, the CAS removed the player's "football-related activities" ban and he was allowed to train with Barcelona. As a result of this ban, Suárez was banned from participating in the 2015 Copa América.

The CAS permitted Suárez to play in friendly matches, and he made his Barcelona debut on 18 August against Club León of Mexico at the Camp Nou, replacing Rafinha for the final 14 minutes of an eventual 6–0 win in the Gamper Trophy. Fellow forwards Lionel Messi and Neymar had already been substituted off by the time Suárez took to the pitch.

==== 2014–15: MSN trio and treble winner ====
Suárez made his competitive debut for Barcelona on 25 October, starting in attack with Messi and Neymar away to Real Madrid in El Clásico. Although he set up Neymar for the opening goal in the fourth minute, Suárez was substituted in the second half and Barcelona lost 3–1. He scored his first goal for the club on 26 November in a 4–0 win at APOEL in the UEFA Champions League group stage. On 20 December, he scored his first league goal for the club in his eighth La Liga match, contributing to a 5–0 home win against Córdoba.

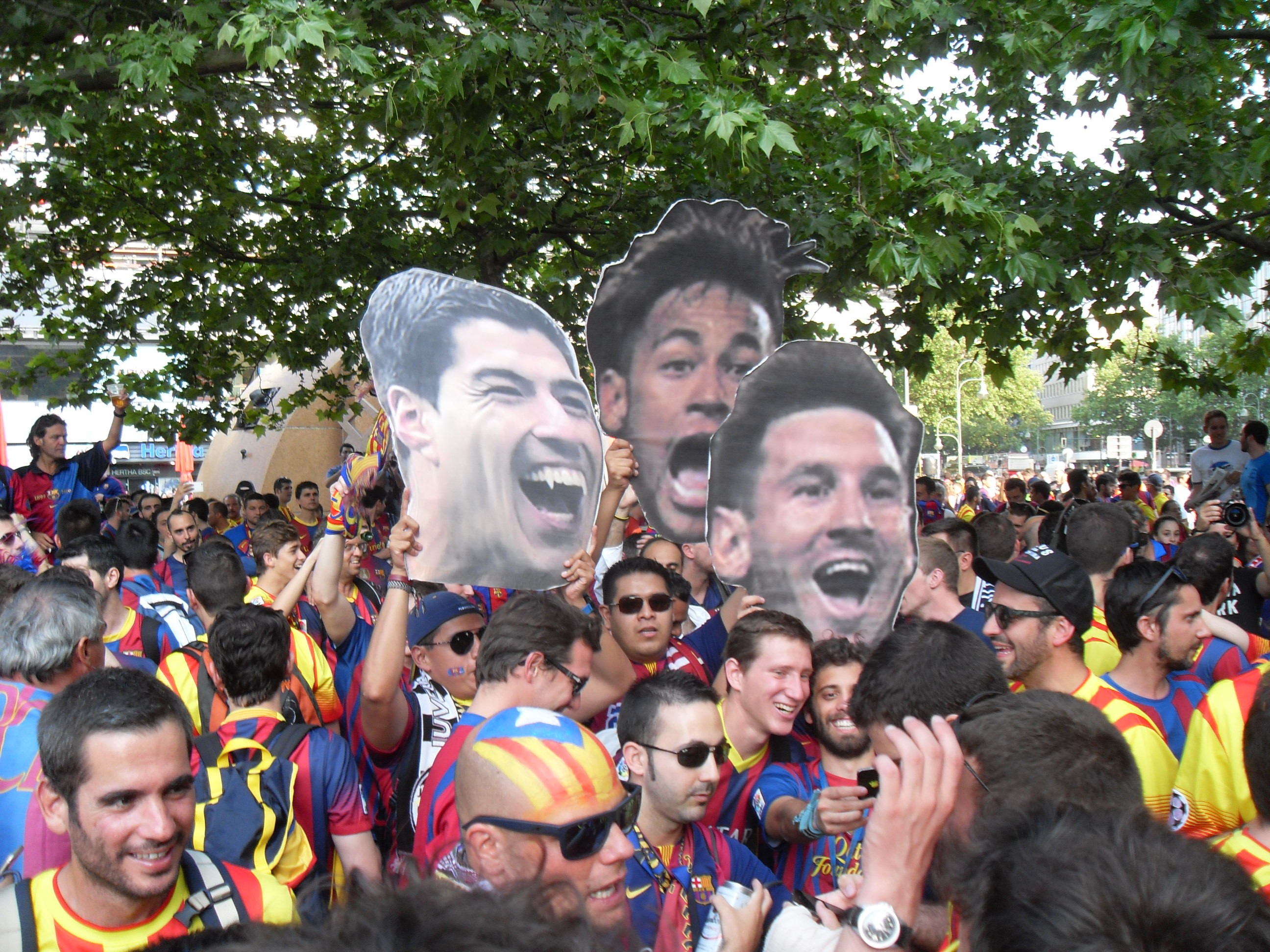
Barcelona fans prior to the 2015 UEFA Champions League Final in Berlin holding up pictures of the attacking trio, Messi, Suárez and Neymar (MSN)

On 24 February 2015, Suárez scored twice as Barça defeated English champions Manchester City 2–1 in the first leg of their UEFA Champions League round of 16 tie. On 4 March, he scored in Barcelona's 3–1 Copa del Rey semi-final win over Villarreal to qualify the club for its 37th Spanish Cup final. On 8 March, Suárez scored twice in a 6–1 home win over Rayo Vallecano. On 22 March, Suárez scored the winning goal for Barcelona in the 2–1 victory over Real Madrid at Camp Nou. In the post-match press conference, his coach Luis Enrique lauded Suárez, saying, "Very few players can score a goal like he did, and that is why we signed him. He can decide games. He's a pure scorer, who needs very little to finish."

On 15 April, Suárez scored two goals in a 3–1 UEFA Champions League quarter-final first leg victory over Paris Saint-Germain at the Parc des Princes. He nutmegged PSG defender David Luiz twice before scoring both goals. On 2 May, he scored his first hat-trick for the club, in 8–0 win at Córdoba. On 12 May, Suárez set up both of Neymar's goals in the second leg of Barcelona's UEFA Champions League semi-final tie as they went on to win 5–3 on aggregate against Bayern Munich. Suárez scored in the Champions League final against Juventus on 6 June in Berlin, putting the team back into the lead in an eventual 3–1 win by converting the rebound after Gianluigi Buffon saved from Messi. The win sealed a treble for the team.

Suárez ended his first season at Barcelona with 25 goals and 20 assists in all competitions. The Barcelona attacking trio of Messi, Suárez and Neymar, dubbed MSN, ended with 122 goals, the most in a season for an attacking trio in Spanish football history.

==== 2015–16: Second European Golden Shoe, domestic success ====
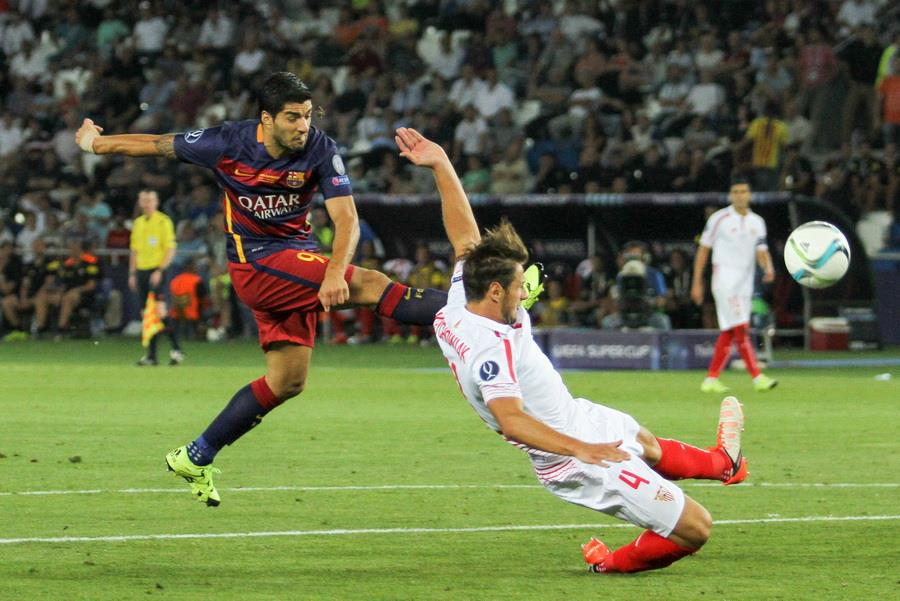
Suárez strikes against Sevilla in the 2015 UEFA Super Cup

Suárez opened the 2015–16 season by scoring and assisting a goal in Barcelona's 5–4 extra time victory over Sevilla in the 2015 UEFA Super Cup, on 11 August 2015. On 25 October, he scored his first hat trick of the season, as Barcelona beat Eibar 3–1. The following week, Suárez scored in a 2–0 away win against Getafe after being assisted with a backheel from Sergi Roberto, his 300th career goal. On 21 November, Suárez scored twice in Barcelona's 4–0 away win against Real Madrid. On 17 December, Suárez scored all three goals as Barcelona defeated Chinese club Guangzhou Evergrande 3–0 in the 2015 FIFA Club World Cup semi-final in Yokohama, Japan, becoming the first player to score a hat-trick in the competition's history. He then scored twice in Barcelona's 3–0 win over Argentine club River Plate in the final, finishing the tournament as top scorer with five goals and being named the best player of the competition. On 17 January 2016, Suárez scored a hat trick against Athletic Bilbao, in a game that ended 6–0 for Barcelona.

On 3 February 2016, Suárez scored four goals in a 7–0 Copa del Rey win against Valencia. On 16 February, he recorded his 3rd hat trick of the LaLiga Campaign, netting 3 against Celta Vigo in Barcelona's 6–1 win. On 16 March, he scored an acrobatic goal as Barcelona beat Arsenal 3–1 in the second leg of their Champions League round of 16 tie. On 5 April, he scored both of Barcelona's goals in a 2–1 comeback victory over Atlético Madrid during their first leg of the quarter-finals, though Barcelona were still eliminated from the competition following defeat in the second leg. On 20 April, Suárez again scored four times in a match, as well as assisting three further goals for teammates, as Barça won 8–0 away at Deportivo La Coruña in La Liga. Three days later, he scored another four goals in a 6–0 home win over Sporting Gijón, becoming the first player to score four times in back-to-back matches in the history of La Liga. On 30 April, Suárez became only the second player in the history of the club to reach the milestone of 35 goals in a single league season.

On the final day of the 2015–16 La Liga season, Suárez scored a hat-trick in a 3–0 victory at Granada, securing a second consecutive Spanish championship for Barça and registering 40 league goals for the season to win his first Pichichi Trophy and a second European Golden Shoe. Suárez also became the first player since 2009 other than Lionel Messi and Cristiano Ronaldo to win both the Pichichi and the Golden Shoe in a season. Fourteen of his goals came in his last five matches. Suárez also led the league in assists, tied at 16 with Messi, becoming the first player ever to lead La Liga in both goals and assists. On 22 May, Suárez suffered a right hamstring injury during Barcelona's 2–0 victory over Sevilla in the 2016 Copa del Rey Final. The club confirmed after the match that he would likely miss at least part of the upcoming Copa América Centenario with his national team. For Uruguay, Suárez also previously missed part of the 2014 World Cup and the entire 2015 Copa América through suspension. Suárez ended the season with 59 goals and 22 assists. The front three of Messi, Suárez and Neymar finished with 131 goals, breaking the record they had set the previous year for most goals by an attacking trio in a single season.

==== 2016–17: Final season of the MSN trio ====
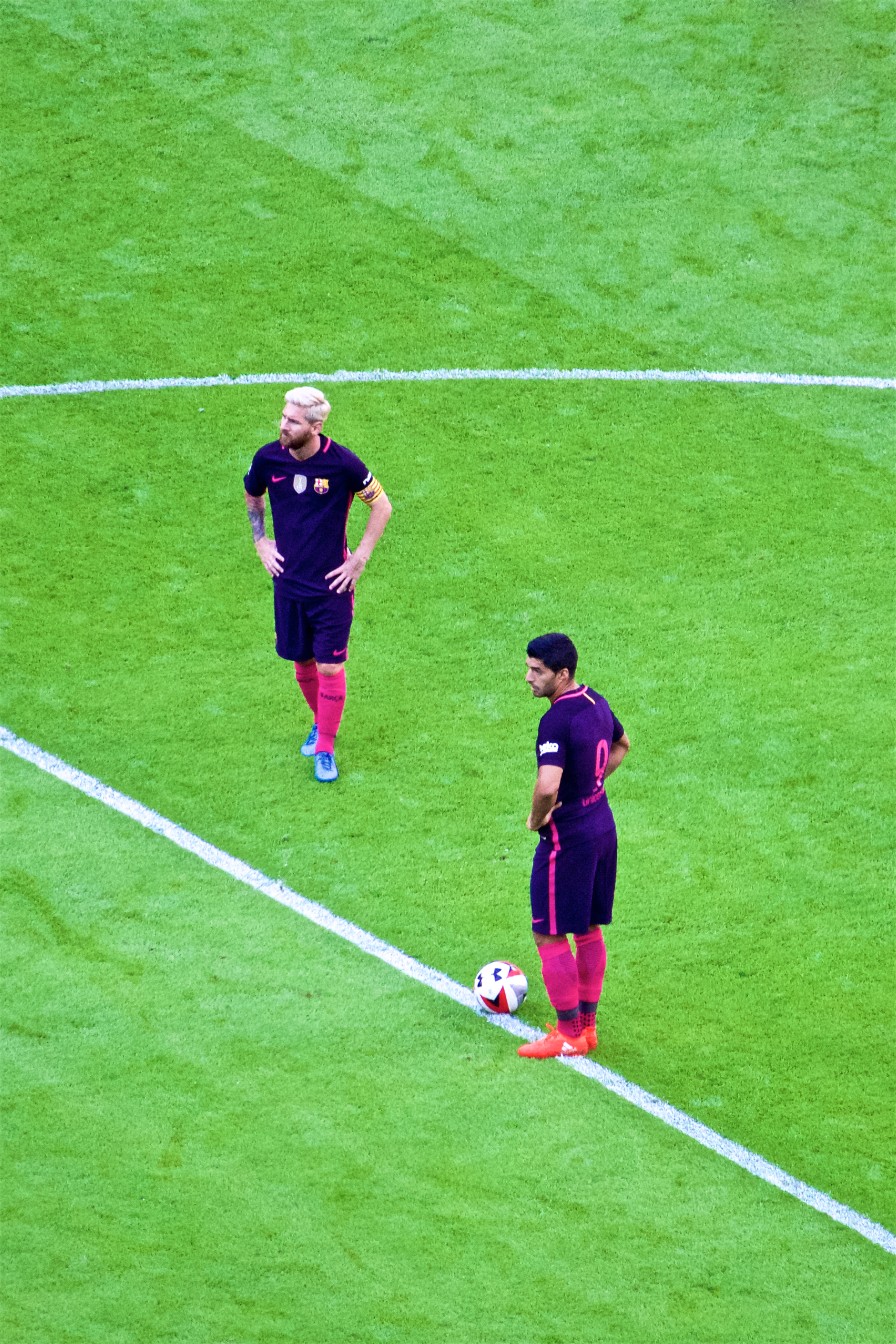
Suárez (front) with Lionel Messi prior to kick off in a pre-season friendly match in 2016

Suárez opened the 2016–17 season by scoring a goal in Barcelona's 2016 Supercopa de España first leg match against Sevilla as they recorded a 2–0 away victory. In the first match of the 2016–17 La Liga season, Suárez scored a hat-trick in a 6–2 victory against Real Betis, also claiming his first free kick goal for Barcelona. Suárez made his 100th Barcelona appearance in a 1–2 defeat at home to Alavés. Though unable to score, Suárez still claimed the distinction of having more goals and assists in his first 100 matches in Spain than both Cristiano Ronaldo and Messi; Suárez contributed 88 goals and 43 assists in his first 100 matches for Barcelona, compared to Ronaldo's 95 goals and 29 assists, and Messi's 41 goals and 14 assists.

Suárez opened his Champions League account for the season with two goals in a 7–0 win defeat of Celtic on 13 September; this was followed by another goal three days later in a 5–1 La Liga win at Leganés.

On 3 December, Suárez opened the scoring with a second half header in El Clásico, though Real Madrid scored a late equalizer and the match ended in a 1–1 draw. Later on 18 December, Suárez scored a brace as well as provided an assist as Barcelona won 4–1 against Espanyol in Derbi barceloní. On 11 January 2017, Suárez scored his 100th goal for Barcelona in a Copa del Rey round of 16 match against Athletic Bilbao.

During the first leg of the Copa del Rey semi-final against Atletico Madrid, on 1 February, Suárez dribbled his way through opposing defence from his own half to score Barcelona's first goal in a narrow 2–1 victory. On 7 February, Suárez scored and was later sent off for a second yellow in Barcelona's semi-final second leg match of the Copa del Rey against Atlético for a foul on Koke, his first red card for the club, meaning he would miss the final. In an interview after the match, Suárez expressed his disdain with the referee's decision, and his desire for the club to appeal it. Barcelona would go on to win the final despite Suárez's absence, lifting the cup for a third straight season.

On 8 March, Suárez opened the scoring with a third-minute header in Barcelona's famous 6–1 victory over PSG in the Champions League round of 16 second leg, also later winning a penalty which Neymar converted for his side's fifth goal. Barcelona won 6–5 over PSG on aggregate, overcoming a 0–4 deficit suffered in the first leg, and achieved the biggest second leg comeback in Champions League history.

Suárez finished the season with 37 goals and 16 assists. Meanwhile, the attacking trio of Messi, Suárez and Neymar ended with 111 goals in their final campaign together.

==== 2017–18: Domestic double and record unbeaten streak ====
On 23 September 2017, Suárez scored in Barcelona's 3–0 win over Girona, in the first ever Catalan derby for the opposition. On 14 October, Suárez maintained Barcelona's undefeated start to the La Liga season with a late header against Atlético Madrid at the Metropolitano Stadium in Madrid. He scored twice against Leganés in a 3–0 win at the Estadio Municipal de Butarque on 18 November. On 2 December, Suárez scored Barcelona's second goal in a 2–2 draw with Celta de Vigo. A week later, on 10 December, Suárez and Messi scored again as Barcelona won 2–0 against Villarreal. On 17 December, Suárez scored two against Deportivo La Coruña in a 4–0 win. Less than a week later, he opened the scoring for Barcelona in a 3–0 win over Real Madrid at the Bernabéu. His goal at El Clásico was the 400th goal of his professional career.

Following the midseason break, Suárez scored twice in a 4–2 comeback win at Real Sociedad on 14 January 2018. A week later, on 21 January, he scored a brace as well as assisted twice in Barcelona's 5–0 win against Real Betis. He scored a hat-trick in a 6–1 home win over Girona on 24 February. On 4 April, Suárez scored during a 4–1 victory over AS Roma in the first leg of Champions League quarter-final, though Roma would end up mounting a comeback, knocking Barcelona out in the second leg.

On 14 April, Suárez scored as Barcelona defeated Valencia 2–1 to secure the longest unbeaten streak in La Liga history, at 39 games. On 21 April, Barcelona won their fourth consecutive Copa del Rey title, beating Sevilla 5–0 in the final in Madrid, with Suárez scoring twice. On 29 April, Suárez set up all three of Messi's goals in a 4–2 victory over Deportivo La Coruña, winning his third league title with Barcelona. A week later, Barcelona held on for a dramatic 2–2 draw at home to Real Madrid on 6 May, to extend their unbeaten streak in the league; Suárez and Messi scored the goals for Barça. Barcelona's record league unbeaten streak came to an end after 43 games, following a 4–5 loss to Levante in the penultimate game of the season on 13 May. Barcelona mounted a comeback after trailing 1–5, with both Suárez and new club record signing Philippe Coutinho scoring a brace each, but they couldn't find an equalizer. Suárez finished the season with 31 goals and 17 assists in total, and his 12 La Liga assists made him league's top assist provider for the third consecutive season.

==== 2018–19: Back-to-back La Liga triumph ====
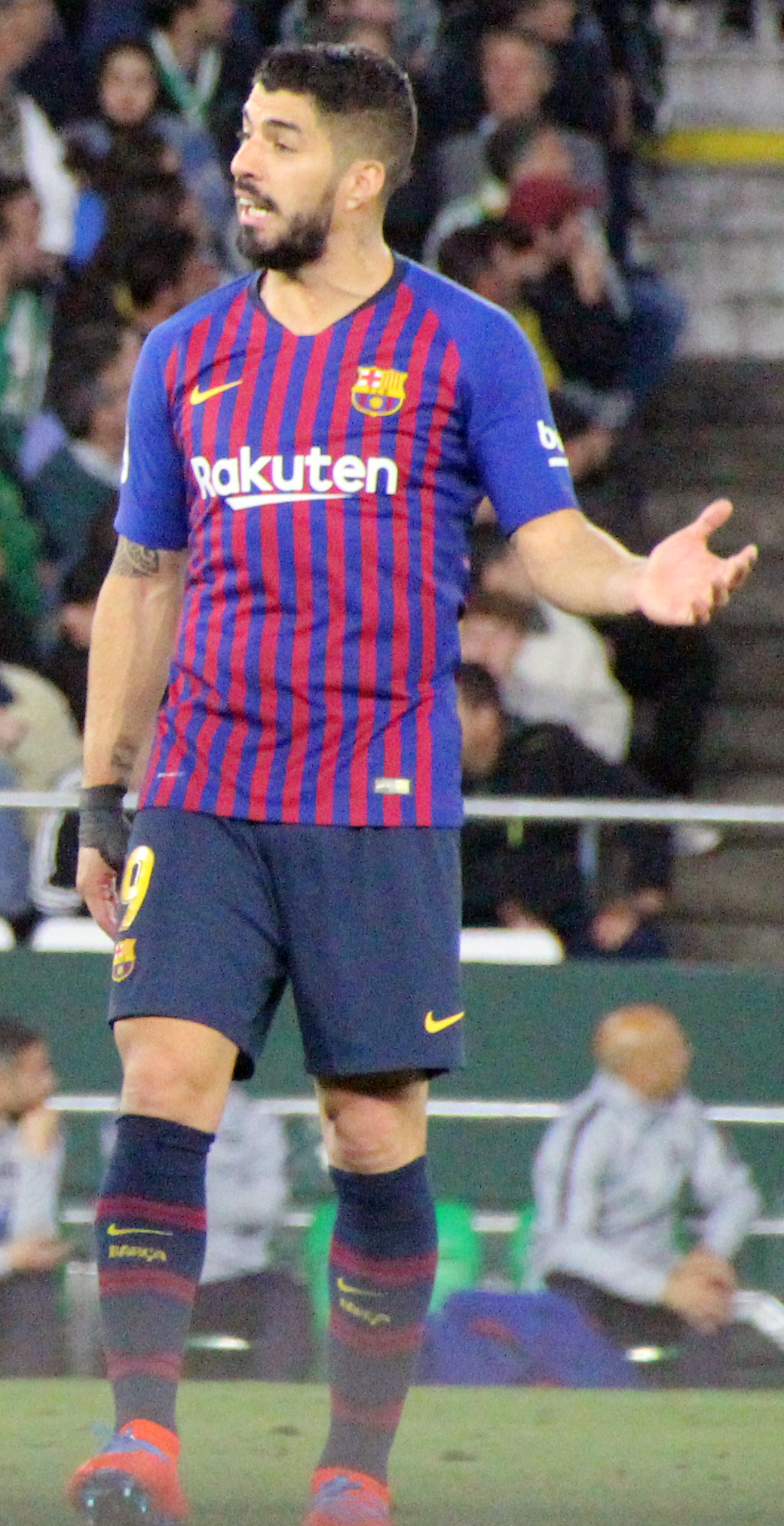
Suárez playing for Barcelona in 2019

Suárez scored twice for Barcelona in an 8–2 win over newly promoted Huesca on 2 September 2018. A week later he scored in their 2–1 victory at Real Sociedad, as the club made it four wins out of four in La Liga. On 28 October, Suárez scored a hat-trick in a 5–1 home win over Real Madrid in El Clásico. He became only the second Barcelona player after Messi to score a league hat-trick in the Clásico over the last twenty years. A week later, on 3 November, Suárez scored twice to lead a 3–2 comeback victory over Rayo Vallecano.

On 13 January, Suárez scored twice and assisted Messi's goal in Barcelona's 3–0 victory over Eibar, helping his team to a 5 points lead on top of the league table. On 27 February, Suárez again scored twice against Real Madrid during a 3–0 victory in the second leg of 2018–19 Copa del Rey semi-final. On 27 April 2019, Barcelona secured a second consecutive La Liga title, and Suárez's fourth league title with the club. However, Suárez scored only one goal in the 2018–19 UEFA Champions League; this came on 1 May, as he netted Barcelona's opener in their 3–0 win over Suárez's former club Liverpool in the first leg of the semi-finals. However, Barcelona would go on to lose the second leg 0–4 at Anfield on 7 May, being eliminated and squandering a three-goal first leg lead in the competition for the second consecutive season. Suárez ended the season with 25 goals and 10 assists in all competitions. Suarez played in the Europa League final and won the game against athletico Madrid 3-0.

==== 2019–20: Final season at Barcelona ====
On 15 September, after coming off a calf injury that he suffered during the first game of the 2019–20 league campaign, Suárez opened his scoring account by netting a brace in a 5–2 victory over Valencia as a 60th-minute substitute. On 2 October, he scored two goals in a 2–1 comeback win over Inter Milan in the 2019–20 UEFA Champions League group stage. Four days later, he opened the scoring in a 4–0 league victory over Sevilla with a bicycle kick.

On 7 December, he scored a curving backheel goal in a 5–2 victory over Mallorca, being lauded by many as one of the goals of the season. Three days later, Suárez captained Barcelona for the first time as he came off the bench to set up Ansu Fati's late goal in a 2–1 win over Inter during the final match of Barcelona's Champions League group. On 12 January 2020, Barcelona confirmed that Suárez would have to undergo a surgery which could see him out for four months, after suffering a knee injury during their defeat against Atlético in the Supercopa de España. By scoring the only goal in a 1–0 win over Espanyol on 9 July, Suárez took his tally to 195 goals with Barcelona, surpassing László Kubala to become the third all-time top scorer in the club's history.

On 8 August, having missed the first leg due to injury, Suárez scored from the penalty spot during Barcelona's 3–1 win over Napoli in the second leg of their Champions League round of 16 tie, as they advanced to the quarter-finals to play Bayern Munich in a single-legged match. On 14 August, Suárez scored his side's second goal as Barcelona suffered a historic 2–8 defeat against Bayern, the club's worst defeat in nearly seventy years that capped a first trophyless season since 2007–08.

=== Atlético Madrid ===
==== 2020–21: Debut season and fifth La Liga title and 5th Copa del rey ====
After becoming Barcelona head coach on 19 August 2020, Ronald Koeman informed Suárez he was no longer wanted, and club president Josep Maria Bartomeu had also left him off a list of players he considered not for sale in the aftermath of the 8–2 defeat to Bayern Munich in the Champions League earlier that month. On 23 September 2020, after failing to join Juventus and amid accusations that he cheated his way to obtain an Italian citizenship, Suárez signed a two-year contract with Atlético Madrid.

On 27 September, Suárez made his debut for the club, scoring two goals and providing Marcos Llorente with an assist in a 6–1 victory against Granada. On 25 November, Suárez's backheel goal against Mallorca, which he scored on 7 December 2019, was nominated for the 2020 FIFA Puskás Award, eventually finishing in second behind a goal scored by Tottenham Hotspur's Son Heung-min. On 3 January 2021, Suárez scored a 90th-minute winner against Alavés, a feat which saw him overtake Radamel Falcao's record for a player's best start with Atlético this century; his eleven goal contributions (nine goals and two assists) in his first twelve La Liga matches surpassed Falcao's nine goals and one assist over the same period in 2011.

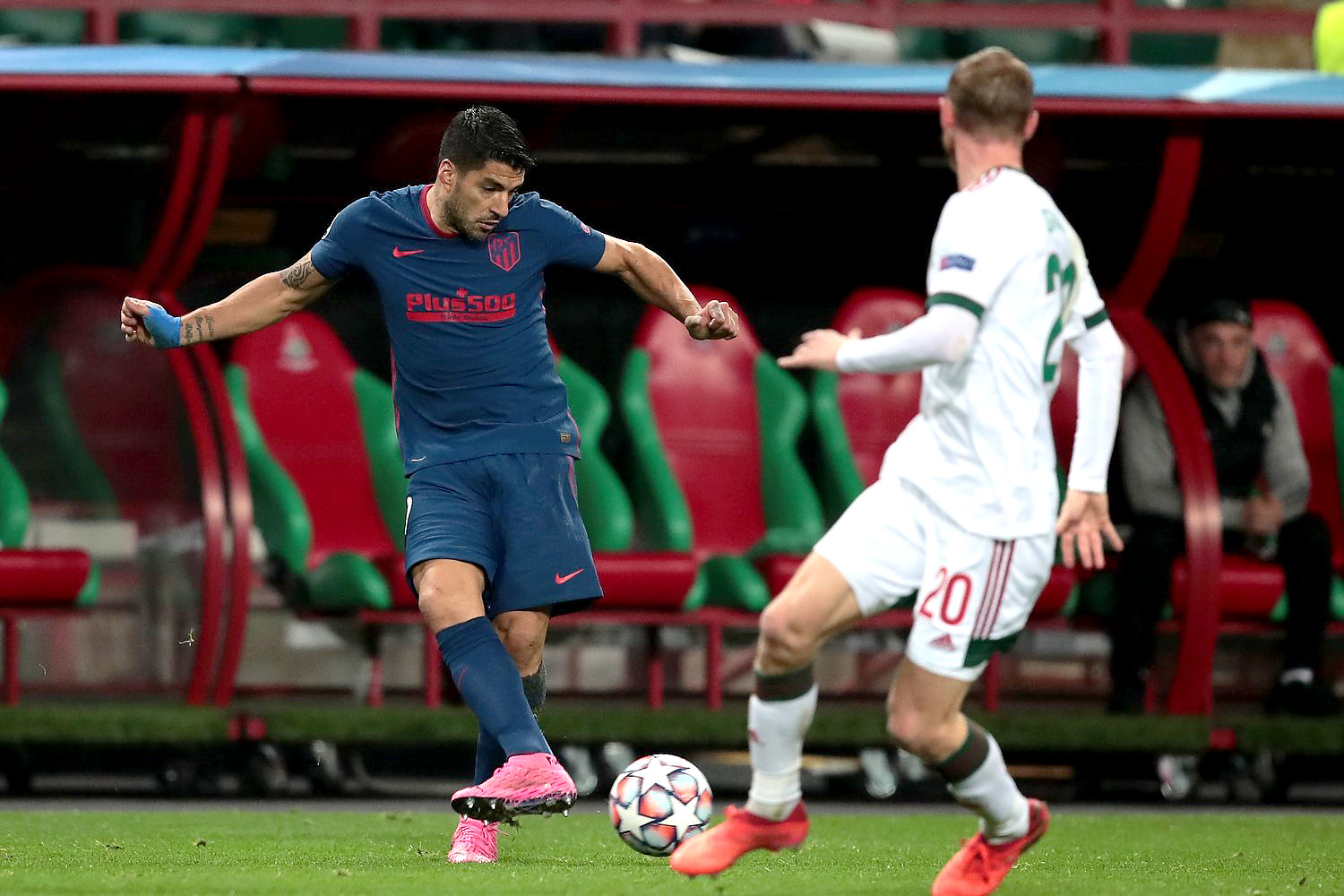
Suárez (left) playing for Atlético against Lokomotiv Moscow in the 2020–21 UEFA Champions League group stage

On 21 January, Suárez scored a brace, including a last-minute penalty, in a 2–1 win over Eibar. This meant that he had managed to hit double figures in goals in each of his past ten league campaigns. Three days later, he scored Atlético's second goal in a 3–1 comeback victory over Valencia, taking his league tally to twelve goals in fifteen games, the joint-most in La Liga. This feat meant Suárez had accomplished the best start for a player at a new club in the league since Cristiano Ronaldo's move to Real Madrid (13 goals in 15 appearances in 2010). On 31 January, Suárez scored another two goals in a 4–2 victory over Cádiz, also netting his first free kick goal for the club. He then scored an additional brace on 8 February, in Atlético's 2–2 draw against Celta Vigo.

On 7 March, Suárez scored the opener against Real Madrid in the Madrid Derby, his first goal in five matches, though Atlético conceded late as the match ended in a 1–1 draw. On 21 March, Suárez headed in the match-winner to score his 500th senior career goal as Atlético edged a 1–0 victory over Alavés. On 16 May, the penultimate matchday of the La Liga season, Suárez scored a crucial winner in the dying minutes of his side's 2–1 comeback victory over Osasuna, recording his twentieth goal of the season and ensuring that Atlético remained on top of the table. On 22 May, the final matchday of the league season, Suárez scored the winning goal in a 2–1 comeback away at Real Valladolid, leading his club to a victory that would ultimately hand them their first La Liga title in seven years. Suárez finished his debut season as Atletico's top scorer with 21 goals.

==== 2021–22: Second season and departure ====
Suárez scored during his first league start of the season against Villarreal, although he suffered a bruise and had to be taken off, resulting in a 2–2 draw. On 21 September, Suárez scored both of Atletico's goals in a 2–1 comeback victory over Getafe. On 28 September, Suárez scored an injury time penalty during a 2–1 comeback away win against AC Milan in the 2021–22 UEFA Champions League group stage. On 2 October, Suárez both scored and assisted as Atletico defeated Barcelona 2–0 in La Liga, though he did not celebrate netting against his former club. Suárez scored another brace on 24 October, as he led Atletico to a 2–2 draw against Real Sociedad after trailing by two goals. On 2 April, he scored two goals against Alavés in a 4–1 win. Following the result he reached a tally of 11 league goals for the season; the tenth consecutive season in domestic leagues he reached double figures in his career.

On 15 May 2022, after the last home match this campaign for Atlético, the team announced Suárez's departure at the end of the season, where he was given a farewell as well as a standing ovation as fans unfurled a giant banner reading "Thank you Lucho for making us champions." Later on, the club also honored Suárez by presenting an illustration of his figure across the main mural at the museum of Wanda Metropolitano. Suárez again ended the season as Atletico's top scorer with 13 goals.

=== Return to Nacional ===
On 26 July 2022, Suárez announced that he had reached a pre-agreement with his boyhood club Nacional FC ahead of a free transfer to the club, which was confirmed the following day. He made his second debut for El Bolso on 2 August, in a Copa Sudamericana 1–0 defeat to Atlético Goianiense, at the Parque Central. Four days later, he scored the final goal in a 3–0 league home win over Rentistas.

On 31 October, during the Championship finals, Suárez had a Man of the Match performance where he scored twice to lead his team to a 4–1 victory against Liverpool Montevideo, making Nacional 2022 Uruguayan Primera División Champions. He ended the season with eight goals and three assists in 14 league games. In the same year won the Torneo Clausura in 2022 the torneo intermedio in 2022 the torneo clausura in 2022 the supercopa de uruguaya in 2022. A few month before his contract with Club national de football expires won the primera division 2023 the torneo apertuta 2023 the torneo clausura 2023 the torneo intermedio in 2023 and the supercopa uruguaya in 2023

=== Grêmio ===
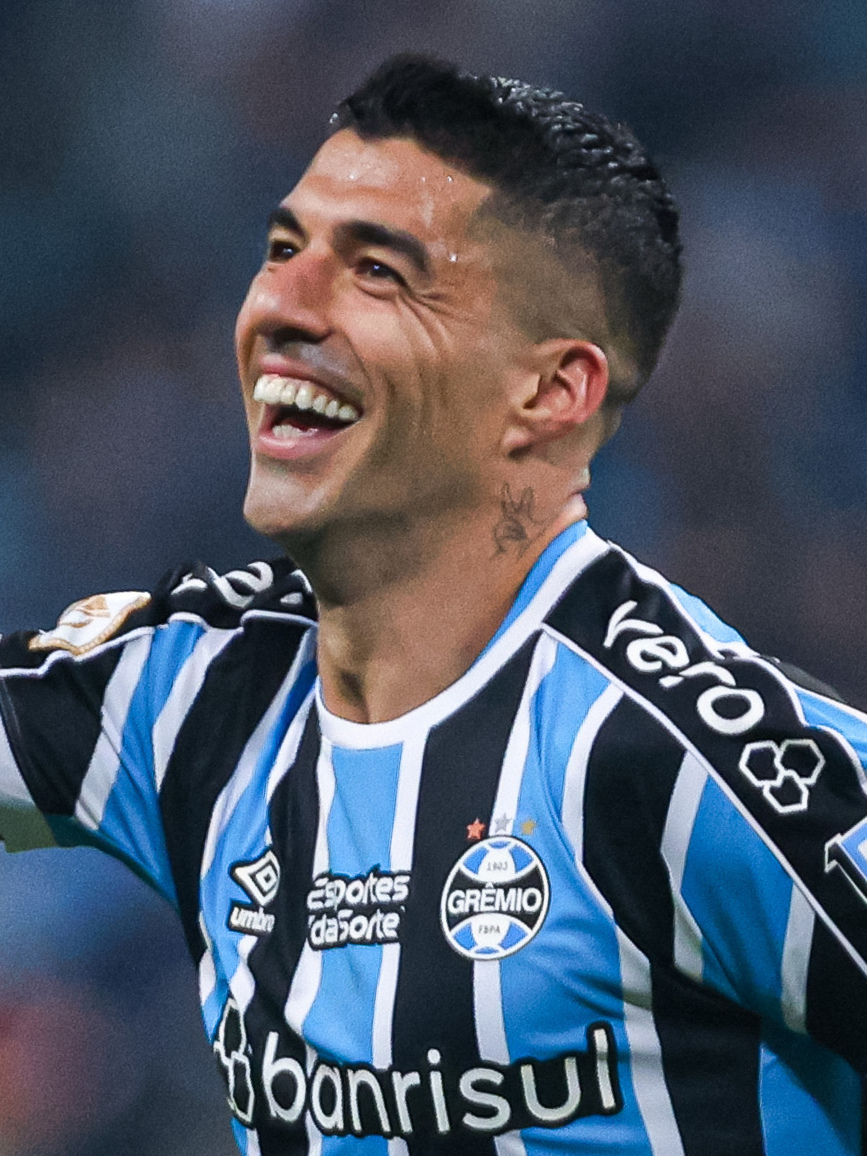
Suárez celebrating one of his goals for Grêmio at the Grenal derby against Internacional in May 2023

On 31 December 2022, Grêmio announced Suárez would join the club on a two-year contract. Suárez was presented on 4 January at Arena do Grêmio in front of 30,000 fans. He made his debut on 17 January 2023 in a match against São Luiz for the 2023 Recopa Gaúcha. Suárez scored a hat-trick in a 4–1 win.

On 8 April, Suárez won his second title for Grêmio: the Campeonato Gaúcho. Suárez scored a penalty goal against Caxias at the second leg of the 2023 Campeonato Gaúcho finals, thus beating Caxias 2–1 on aggregate.

In late June, rumours began to circulate that Suárez might retire before the end of his contract due his extensive knee injuries. On 21 June in a press conference, Grêmio president Alberto Guerra announced that Suárez "gives himself almost daily injections and special treatments, he is in constant pain. It is serious. Suárez has the possibility of being fitted with a prosthesis." However, on the next day, Grêmio played against América Mineiro, resulting in a 3–1 victory with a decisive performance by Suárez; with one goal, one assist and multiple plays and goal attempts. In the post-match press interview, Grêmio's vice-president Paulo Caleffi denied any rumors and Suárez himself mocked the rumors in social media.

In July, rumours resurfaced that Suárez still had knee issues and wished to leave early, starting negotiations with Grêmio's board. After various rumours on media, Suárez revealed on a press conference together with Grêmio's vice-president Antônio Brum that he would shorten his contract to the end of 2023. He cited that his knee issues were particularly exacerbated with the long and intense schedule of the Brazilian league.

On 9 November 2023, Suárez scored his second hat-trick for Grêmio, as they beat leaders Botafogo away 4–3 after trailing 3–1 and won the Campeonato Gaucho 2023 and Recopa

He finished the Campeonato Brasileiro with 17 goals and 11 assists, totaling 28 goal contributions in 33 games. He was the leader in goal participation in the competition, leading Grêmio to be the runner-up in the championship. In December, Suárez was elected Best Player of the Brasileirão and awarded the Bola de Ouro by ESPN Brazil.

=== Inter Miami ===
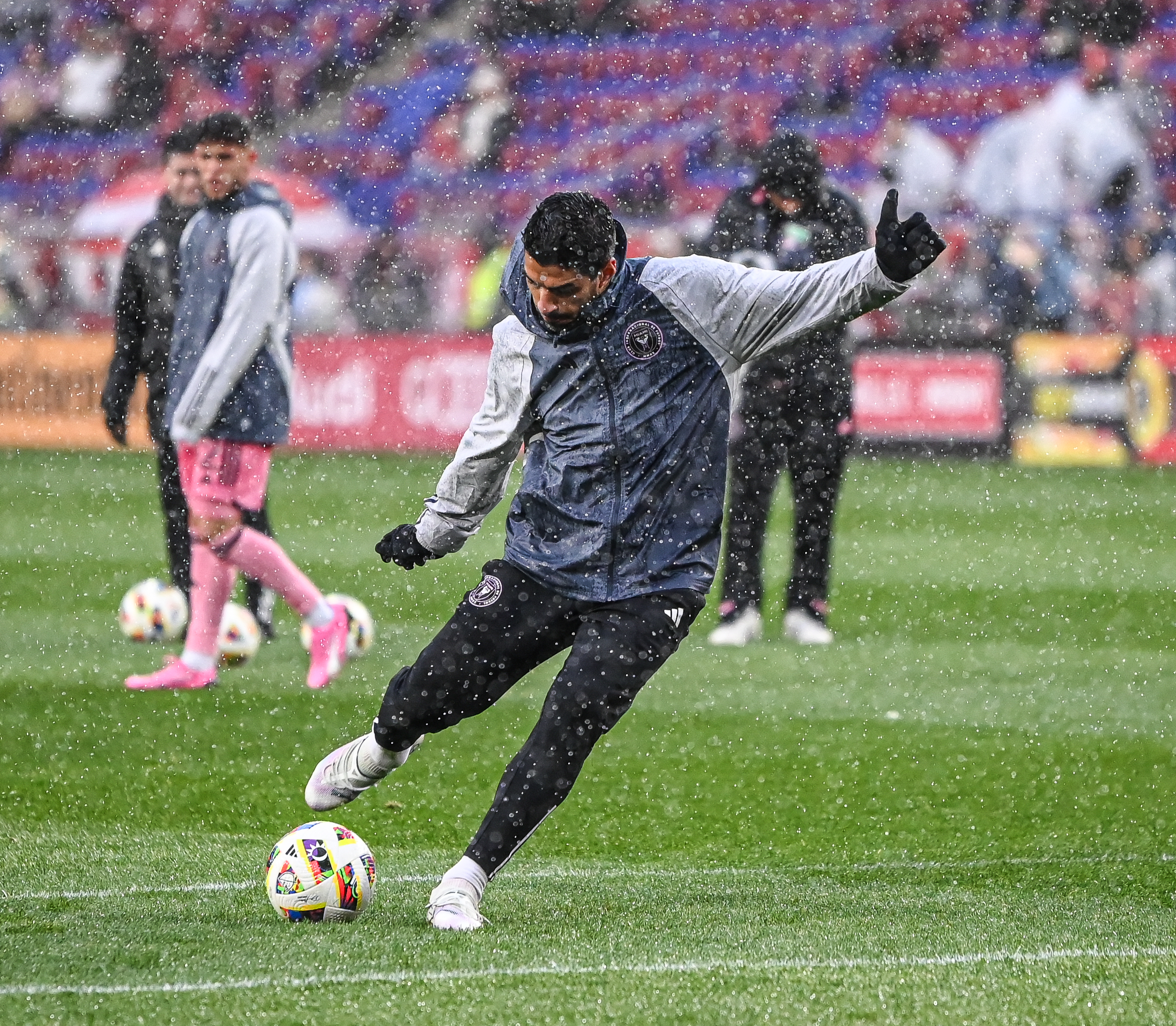
Suárez training for a game against the New York Red Bulls on 23 March 2024

In the summer of 2023, plans were made for Suárez to join Inter Miami for a reunion with Messi, Sergio Busquets, and Jordi Alba. However, his contract with Grêmio did not allow him to join the club. In October, Inter Miami's head coach, Gerardo Martino, said that the club was planning on the possible arrival of Suárez in 2024, having an analysis of the 2024 season with and without Suárez. By November, multiple reports indicated that Suárez was set to join Inter Miami on a one-year deal with an option for a further year. On 22 December 2023, Inter Miami officially announced Suárez would join the club for the 2024 season.

Suárez made his 2024 MLS season debut in a match against Real Salt Lake on 21 February 2024, providing an assist to Diego Gómez in a 2–0 win. Suárez scored his first goals for the club on 2 March with a brace against cross-state rivals Orlando City in a 5–0 victory, helping secure the club's largest ever margin of victory. On 7 March, Suárez and Inter Miami made their debuts in the CONCACAF Champions Cup against Nashville SC. He would score a goal, helping the first leg end 2–2. On 4 May, Suárez scored his first hat-trick for the club with the help of three assists from Messi in a 6–2 win over the New York Red Bulls. On 24 August, Suárez scored the fastest goal in the club's history when he fired a shot past FC Cincinnati's Roman Celentano just 30 seconds after the start of the game. Suárez would make it a brace just 5 minutes later to seal a 2–0 victory. On 14 September, Suárez scored his 17th goal for the club in league play to help Inter Miami to a 3–1 win over Philadelphia Union which also allowed him to surpass Gonzalo Higuaín's club record for the most goals scored in the regular season.

On 27 November 2024, Suárez signed a new one-year contract with Inter Miami, extending his stay at the club until the end of the 2025 season.

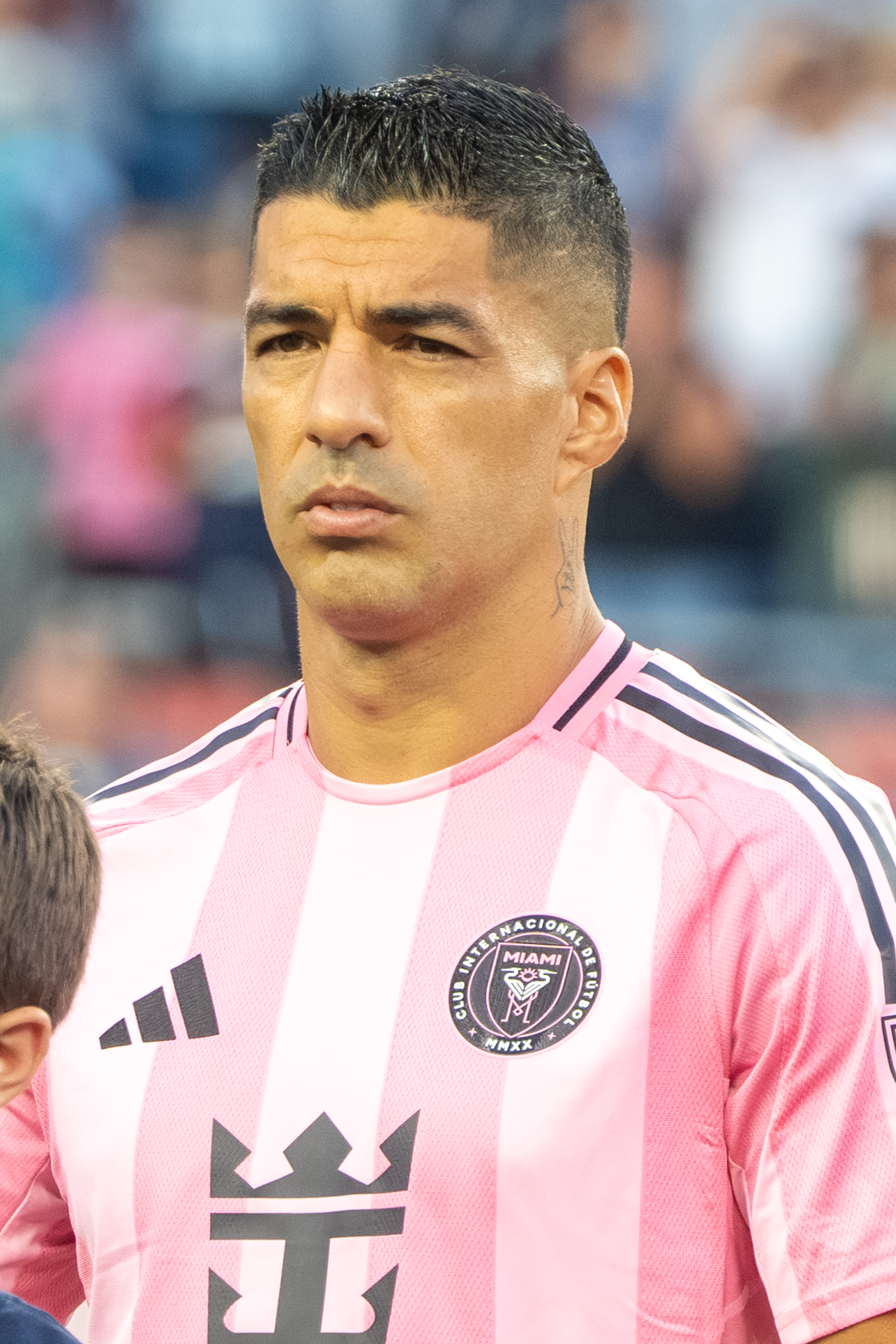
Suárez ahead of a game against the New England Revolution in July 2025

Suárez made his debut in the 2025 MLS season in a 2–2 draw against New York City on 22 February 2025. A few days later on 25 February 2025, Suárez and Lionel Messi were fined by the MLS Disciplinary Committee for violating the league's hands to the face/head/neck policy during the opening match of the season three days earlier against New York City FC. Suárez grabbed the back of the neck of New York City FC player Birk Risa during an argument at the start of half-time. Despite getting fined by MLS, Messi and Suárez were still able to play against Sporting KC on the same day in the CONCACAF Champions Cup, with both of them scoring in a 3–1 win.

Suárez would score his first goal of the season on 2 March 2025 in a game against Houston Dynamo it resulted in a 4–1 win he would also get three goal contributions in the game with assists to newcomer, Telasco Segovia and Tadeo Allende. On 6 March, Suárez scored a goal against Cavalier F.C. where they won 2–0 in the first leg of the CONCACAF Champions Cup. He would score against Cavalier F.C. again on March 13, through a penalty in another 2–0 win in the second leg sending them to the quarter-finals of the CONCACAF Champions Cup. Later that year, on 24 June, he scored in a 2–2 draw against Palmeiras during the 2025 FIFA Club World Cup, becoming, at the age of 38 years and 151 days, the second oldest player in history to score in the Club World Cup, only behind Sergio Ramos, who had set the record a few days earlier at 39.

The 2025 Leagues Cup final was played between Inter Miami and the Seattle Sounders at Lumen Field in Seattle, with the home team winning 3–0. The rough timeline shows that the brawl started after the full time whistle when Suárez and Obed Vargas were bantering. This led Suárez to put his arm around Vargas' neck, putting him in a headlock, with the benches clearing afterwards, and Suárez spitting on Sounders security director Gene Ramirez. Suárez stepped onto the foot of Ramirez, who was trying to disengage, and spat on the bill of Ramirez's cap and cheek.

Suárez received suspensions for the 2026 Leagues Cup and three MLS regular season matches for his actions during the final. He issued an apology on 4 September. A month later, on 12 October, he scored his 600th career goal in a 4–0 victory over Atlanta United. Later that year, on 17 December, he signed a one-year contract extension with the club after they won the MLS Cup earlier that month against Vancouver Whitecaps.

== International career ==
Suárez was invited to play for Uruguay in the qualifying rounds for the 2007 U-20 World Cup, but his club, Groningen, did not release him to play. He did play in the tournament finals, and he scored two goals in four appearances. His goals came in a group stage draw against Spain and in the Round of 16 against the United States, but the U.S. won 2–1 and Uruguay was eliminated from the tournament.

Suárez made his senior debut for Uruguay on 8 February 2007 in a 3–1 win against Colombia. He was sent off in the 85th minute after receiving a second yellow card for dissent. Suárez played in 19 of 20 games in 2010 World Cup qualifying and the inter-confederation play-offs and scored five goals.

=== 2010 FIFA World Cup ===
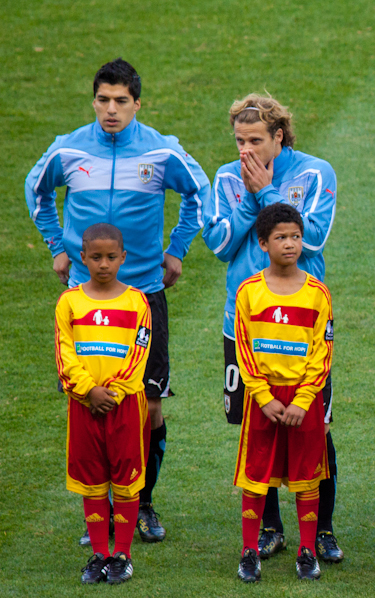
Suárez (left) and Diego Forlán at the 2010 FIFA World Cup in South Africa

In June 2010, Óscar Tabárez named Suárez to Uruguay's 23-man World Cup squad. Uruguay began the tournament with a 0–0 draw against France. In the second match, a 3–0 win over South Africa, Suárez drew a penalty and assisted Álvaro Pereira's stoppage time goal. In the final match of the group stage, he headed in a goal off a pass from Edinson Cavani and was named Man of the Match in a 1–0 win over Mexico. Uruguay won Group A and advanced to the knockout stage.

During the round of 16 against South Korea, Suárez scored both goals in a 2–1 win. His second broke a tie in the 80th minute when he dribbled around a defender and curled a "spectacular shot" in off the far post; Suárez was again named Man of the Match. This win put Uruguay through to the quarter-finals for the first time since 1970. In the quarter-final against Ghana, the score was 1–1 at the end of regulation and the match went into extra time. Late in extra time, Ghana sent a free-kick into the box, and Suárez blocked Stephen Appiah's shot on the goal line. He then blocked Dominic Adiyiah's goal bound header with his hands, committing a professional foul to save what would have been the game winner and was sent off. Asamoah Gyan hit the crossbar with the ensuing penalty kick and Suárez, who had stopped to watch, celebrated the miss before heading down the tunnel. Uruguay won the shootout 4–2 and advanced to the semi-finals.

After the match, Suárez said, "I made the save of the tournament." He said he had no alternative, was acting out of instinct, and would do it again if it helped his team win. Ghana head coach Milovan Rajevac said the play was an "injustice" and Suárez was labelled a villain and a cheater. Others viewed him as a hero. Due to the automatic suspension that accompanies a red card, Suárez sacrificed himself in the semi-final for the unlikely chance the penalty would be missed, and his team would later win.

While Suárez was suspended for the semi-final match for his red card against Ghana, Uruguay "lacked a second striker [alongside Diego Forlán] of cunning and movement" and lost 3–2 to the Netherlands. Suárez returned for the third place game against Germany; he was booed almost every time he had the ball because of his handball in the Ghana match. He assisted Cavani on Uruguay's first goal, but Uruguay lost 3–2. During the tournament, Suárez played 543 minutes in six appearances and scored three goals.

=== 2011 Copa América ===
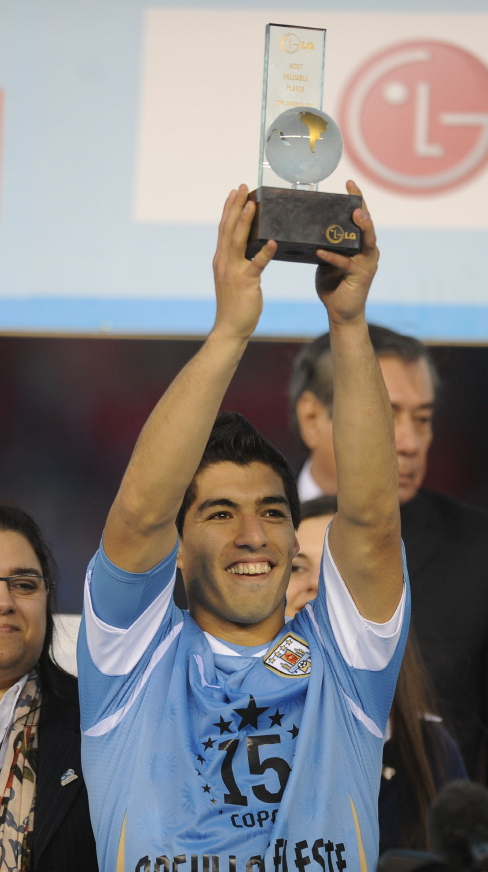
Suárez was named most valuable player of the 2011 Copa América

In the 2011 Copa América, Suárez scored in Uruguay's opening game, a 1–1 draw with Peru. In their next game, he provided the assist for Alvaro Pereira's goal in a 1–1 draw with Chile. Uruguay finished second in their group and advanced to the knockout round with a win, 1–0 against Mexico, and two draws, against Peru and Chile. In the quarter-finals, Uruguay drew with tournament hosts Argentina 1–1 after regulation and extra time. Uruguay won the shootout 5–4 and Suárez converted his penalty. Suárez scored both goals in Uruguay's 2–0 semi-final win over Peru and was named Man of the Match. In the final, Suárez scored the opening goal and set up Diego Forlan's second goal as Uruguay defeated Paraguay 3–0 for their record 15th Copa América title. Suárez scored four goals and provided two assists during the tournament and was named MVP of the Tournament.

=== 2012 Summer Olympics ===
On 9 July 2012, Suárez was selected for the Uruguay Olympic football team alongside Liverpool teammate Sebastián Coates to compete in the 2012 Olympic Games. In the first pre-tournament warm-up game against Chile on 11 July, Suárez scored a hat-trick for Uruguay as they came from 0–2 down to win 6–4 in a thrilling match.

As one of Uruguay's three overage players, Suárez was named as captain for the Olympic Games. After an opening win over the United Arab Emirates, Uruguay were defeated by Senegal and Great Britain and eliminated at the first round. Suárez failed to score during the tournament.

=== 2013 Confederations Cup ===
Suárez was selected in the Uruguay squad to play in Brazil at the 2013 Confederations Cup. He scored a curling free-kick from 30 yards (27 m) in a 2–1 defeat to Spain in their opening match at Recife on 16 June. He then scored twice after appearing as a substitute in Uruguay's 8–0 win over Tahiti, making him the Uruguay national team's all-time top-goalscorer with 35 goals, surpassing his teammate Diego Forlán. Uruguay were eventually eliminated in the semi-finals, losing 2–1 to Brazil in Belo Horizonte.

=== 2014 FIFA World Cup, third biting incident ===
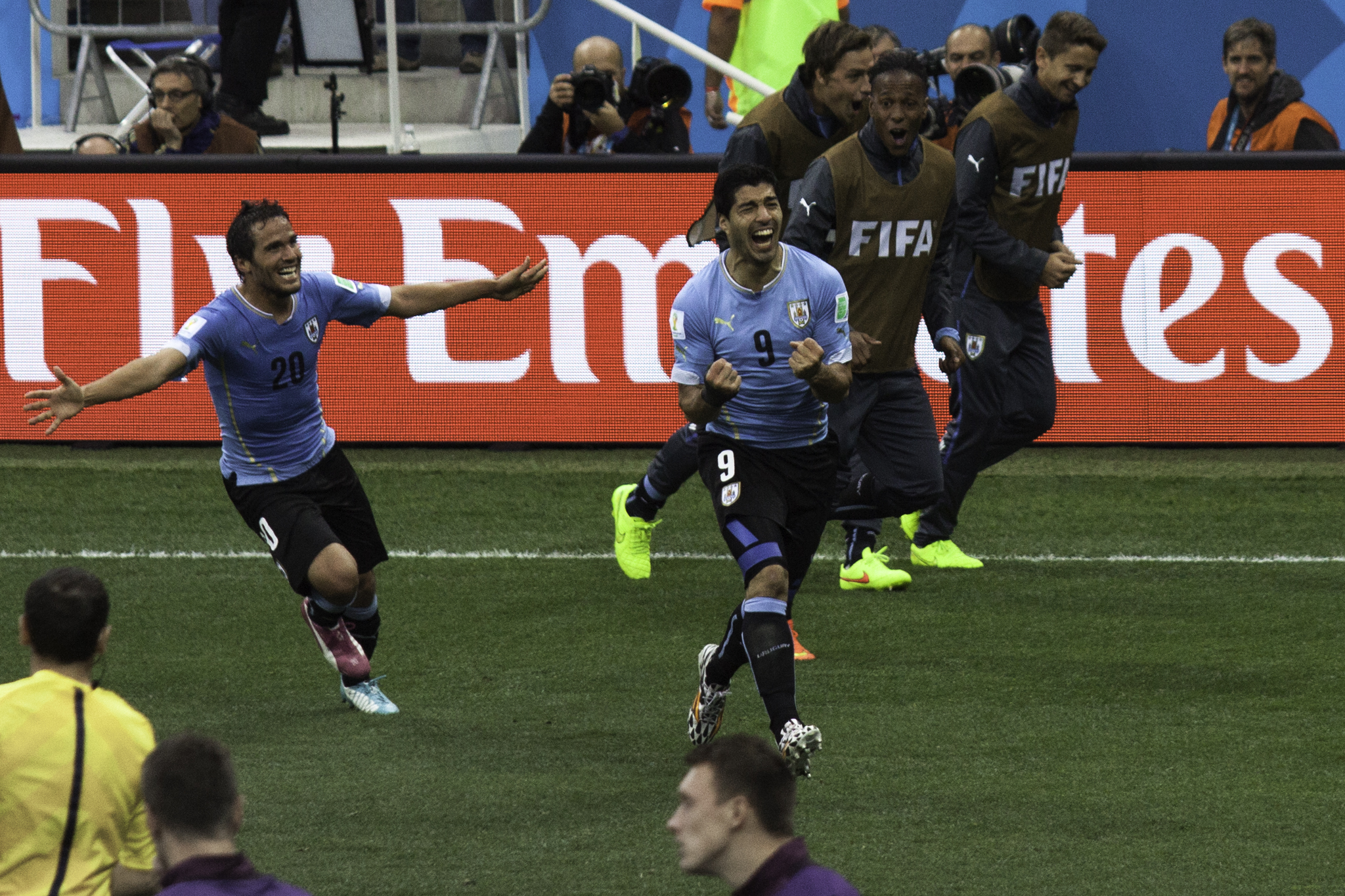
Suárez (middle) celebrating one of his two goals against England at the 2014 World Cup

Suárez ended the 2014 World Cup qualification campaign as top scorer in the South American section with 11 goals in 14 matches. In November 2013, Uruguay defeated Jordan 5–0 on aggregate in an intercontinental play-off to qualify for the 2014 World Cup.

On 22 May, Suárez underwent emergency surgery on his left knee. He used a wheelchair for a time, leading to rumours he would be unable to participate in the World Cup. He was named as a substitute for Uruguay's first match, a 3–1 defeat to Costa Rica, but did not play in the match. Suárez started Uruguay's second match against England and scored both of the team's goals in a 2–1 win at the Arena Corinthians in São Paulo.

For Uruguay's final group match against Italy on 24 June, Uruguay needed a win to advance to the knockout stage while Italy only needed a draw. Around the 79th minute and with the score at 0–0, Suárez clashed with Italian defender Giorgio Chiellini while waiting for a cross. Replays showed that Suárez lunged at Chiellini and bit his shoulder (Chiellini showed bite marks), followed by Suárez falling and clutching his face. The controversial incident made headline news around the world. As the Italian players protested to Mexican referee Marco Antonio Rodríguez for not penalizing Suárez for the bite, Uruguay won a corner and scored. The match would finish 1–0 to Uruguay as they qualified for the knockout stage and eliminated Italy, who finished third in the group.

Two days later, on 26 June, the FIFA Disciplinary Committee, banned Suárez for nine international matches, effective immediately, meaning he would take no further part in the World Cup. The ban ruled him out of 2015 Copa América as well. It was the longest such ban in World Cup history, exceeding the eight-match ban handed to Italy's Mauro Tassotti for breaking the nose of Spain's Luis Enrique at the 1994 World Cup. He was also banned from taking part in any football-related activity (including entering any stadium) for four months and fined CHF100,000. The seven-member FIFA panel studied the incident from 34 camera angles and rejected Suárez's defense that the bite was as a result of an accidental collision, instead finding the bite was "deliberate, intentional and without provocation... with the intention of wounding [Chiellini] or at least of destabilizing him". The severity of the penalty was due to the fact it was Suárez's third biting offence, as well as what FIFA saw as a lack of remorse. Soon after the suspension was announced, online gambling firm 888poker cancelled its sponsorship deal with Suárez. With Suárez banned, Uruguay lost their next match 0–2 to Colombia and were eliminated from the World Cup.

On the same day the ban was announced, the Uruguayan Football Association (AUF) said it would appeal the suspension. Suárez's lawyer said that "we don't have any doubts" of a European-based campaign against Suárez. Various Uruguayan individuals defended Suárez, questioning if he had actually bitten Chiellini, and criticized the severity of his ban, including President of Uruguay José Mujica, who labelled the ban "fascist" and called FIFA "a bunch of old sons of bitches"; AUF president Wilmar Valdez; Uruguay captain Diego Lugano; and Uruguay head coach Óscar Tabárez, who resigned from two FIFA posts in protest of the ban. The Uruguayan media were also noted to have been in a defiant and defensive mood. For non-Uruguayan parties, Chiellini, who was bitten, called the ban "excessive", while international players' union FIFPro called for Suárez to "receive all the support he needs" and that the "focus should be on the rehabilitation and serious treatment" of Suárez.

Six days after the incident, on 30 June, Suárez apologized to Chiellini through Twitter and vowed never to repeat the incident, while writing that the "physical result of a bite" occurred in a collision with Chiellini. Chiellini responded through Twitter indicating all was forgotten and his hope that FIFA would reduce Suárez's suspension.

On 3 July, the AUF appealed Suárez's ban, but it was rejected by FIFA on 10 July. With Suárez's ban not preventing him from transferring to another club, it was announced on 11 July that Suárez had agreed to move to Barcelona. Days before the transfer, Suárez's apology to Chiellini had been praised by various Barcelona club individuals. Barcelona club president Josep Maria Bartomeu said the apology was "honorable", sporting director Andoni Zubizarreta welcomed Suárez as being "humble enough to admit an error" while new signing Ivan Rakitić commended Suárez's "character and strength".

=== Copa América Centenario and 2018 FIFA World Cup ===
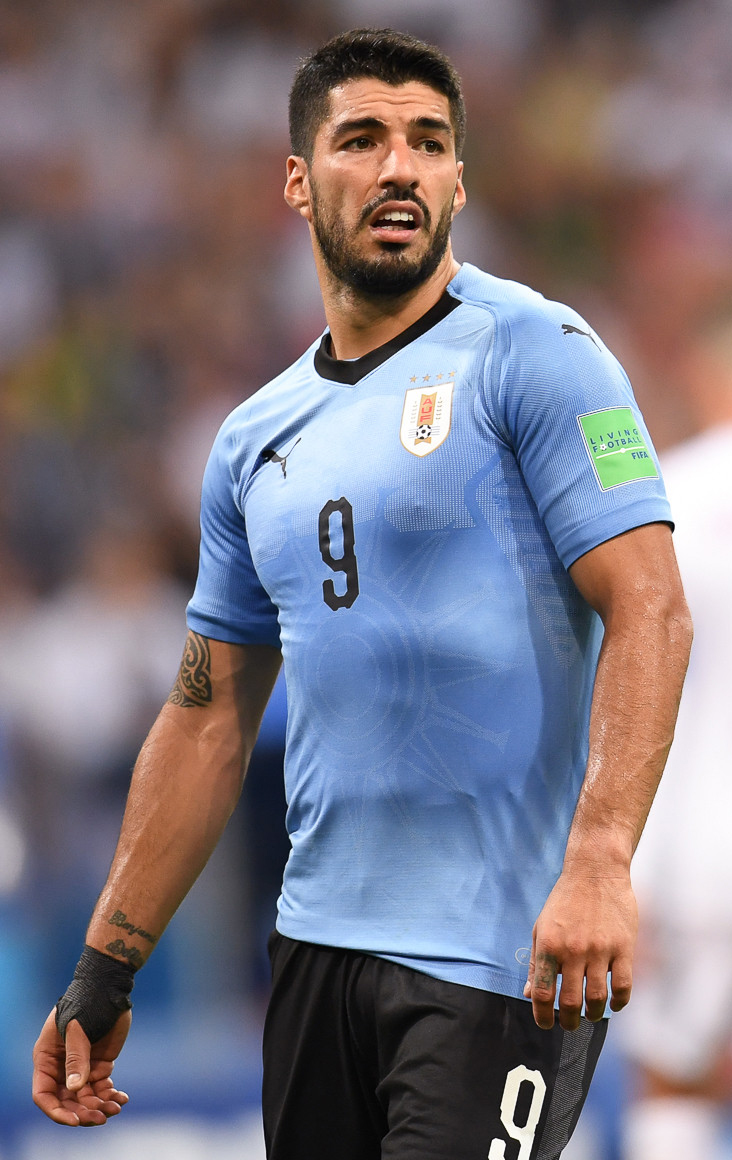
Suárez playing against Portugal in the last 16 of the 2018 World Cup

On 25 March 2016, after over a year of international absence for Uruguay, Suárez scored an equalizer against Brazil in Recife for a 2–2 draw in the qualification process for the 2018 FIFA World Cup. Suárez was included in Uruguay's 23-man squad for the Copa América Centenario, although a hamstring injury sustained in the Copa del Rey final on 22 May put his place in the team in jeopardy. Although he remained in the squad, he missed both of his national side's opening group losses to Mexico and Venezuela, which resulted in a first-round elimination from the tournament. He was once again left on the substitutes' bench in Uruguay's final 3–0 group win over Jamaica on 13 June.

Suárez scored twice on 10 October 2017 as Uruguay won 4–2 at home to Bolivia in their final World Cup qualifying match, thus securing their place for the tournament in Russia, as well as becoming the joint all-time leading scorer in CONMEBOL World Cup qualifiers with 21 goals, alongside Argentina's Lionel Messi, overtaking the previous record which was held by Hernán Crespo. In March, Uruguay won the 2018 China Cup, and Suárez scored his 50th international goal with a penalty against the Czech Republic in the semi-finals, winning it himself when fouled by goalkeeper Jiří Pavlenka. He won his 100th cap on 20 June 2018 in Uruguay's second group match at the World Cup, scoring the only goal against Saudi Arabia at the Rostov Arena in Rostov-on-Don to advance the nation into the last 16, for which Suárez was given man of the match. In the final group game on 25 June, Suárez was again named the man of the match as he scored Uruguay's opener with a free kick into the bottom corner in a 3–0 win over hosts Russia. In the Round of 16 match against Portugal on 30 June, he set-up Cavani's opening goal in an eventual 2–1 victory. Uruguay were eliminated from the tournament following a 2–0 defeat to France in the quarter-finals on 6 July.

=== 2019–2020: Qualifiers and Copa América upset ===
In March 2019, manager Tabárez included Suárez in the final 23-man Uruguay squad for the 2019 Copa América in Brazil. On 16 June, he scored the third goal in a 4–0 win over Ecuador in the team's opening group match of the tournament, also setting up the opener scored by Nicolás Lodeiro.

In the quarter-finals against Peru on 29 June, he had a goal disallowed by VAR for offside, and was subsequently the only player to miss his spot-kick in the resulting penalty shoot-out, following a 0–0 draw after regulation time, which saw Uruguay eliminated from the competition.

On 8 October 2020, Suárez scored the first goal of the South American 2022 FIFA World Cup qualification, becoming the first player ever to score the opening goal three times (after his 2010 and 2014 strikes) in the competition's history.

=== 2021–2022: Copa América and World Cup ===
On 22 June 2021, Suárez scored in a 1–1 draw against Chile in Uruguay's second group match of the 2021 Copa América in Brazil. However, Uruguay lost against Colombia in the quarter-finals on penalties after a goalless draw.

On 2 December 2022, in Uruguay's final group match of the 2022 FIFA World Cup in Qatar against Ghana, Suárez assisted Giorgian de Arrascaeta's second goal of the match to give Uruguay a 2–0 win; however, group rivals South Korea scored a late goal to win 2–1 against already-qualified Portugal, advancing from the group stage instead of Uruguay having scored four goals to Uruguay's two (both teams were tied at 4 points and a 0 goal difference).

=== 2023–2024: Copa América third place ===
On 13 July 2024, Suárez scored a last minute equalizer in the 2024 Copa América third place play-off match against Canada, after coming off the bench, and also scored his effort in the subsequent penalty shootout, clinching the bronze medal for Uruguay.

On 2 September 2024, Suárez announced that he would retire from the national team after the match against Paraguay for the 2026 World Cup qualifiers on 6 September, ending his 17-year era of representing his national team after a 0–0 draw. He also received a yellow card for his protests to the referee late in the match.

== Style of play ==
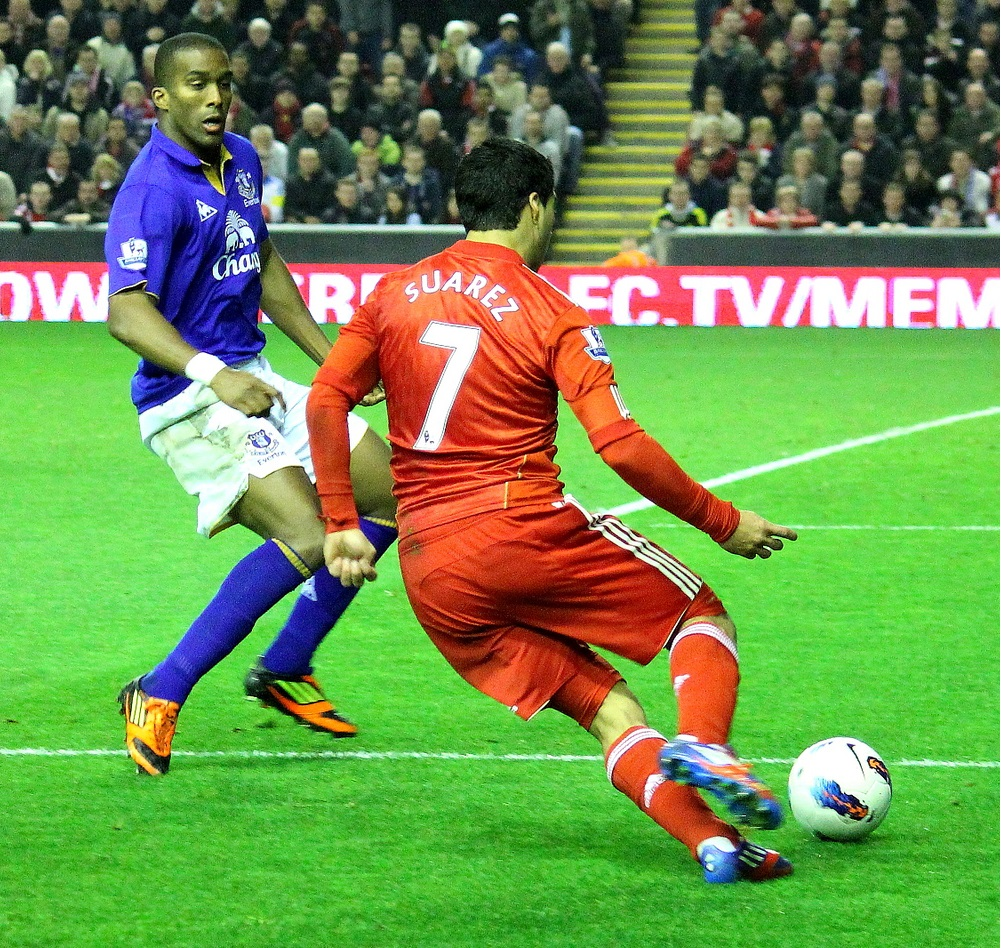
Suárez, in action for Liverpool, takes on Sylvain Distin of Everton during the Merseyside Derby in 2012

Suárez has "remarkable technical ability" according to his FIFA profile. Known for his direct running at players, Suárez has a particular penchant for nutmegging opponents (putting the ball through their legs). Liverpool fans (accompanied with a banner) used to say he was so good, "he could nutmeg a mermaid". Considered at his peak to be one of the best strikers in the world, Suárez is a prolific goalscorer, having the rare distinction of being the leading scorer in three top-flight European leagues, a feat only matched by Ruud van Nistelrooy and Cristiano Ronaldo. An accurate finisher with either foot, despite being naturally right-footed, he is capable of scoring from both inside and outside the penalty area.

Harry Redknapp said that Suárez could play anywhere – as the target man or behind as a second striker. Uruguay head coach Óscar Tabárez called Suárez "a great forward, an elite player among forwards in the world", and Liverpool coach Kenny Dalglish said, "he's intelligent, he's had a fantastic education at Ajax". Former Liverpool striker John Aldridge said his abilities allow him to get into a position to score and evade defenders. Meanwhile, Thierry Henry called Suárez the best striker in the world, stating, "He has everything. He's in your face, he's arrogant- in a good way, he can volley it, he can score headers. He has vicious side to his game and I will not call it cheating. He knows how to score goals."

Suárez has been praised for his work rate, movement, and his quickness that allows him to attack from the outside; as such he occasionally played as an inverted winger on the left flank during his time with Ajax. Additionally, Suárez has a liking for often executing dummies (going around the defenders with a fake-out) within his style of dribbling. During his time in Barcelona, he was known for constantly scoring through volleys or half-volleys. Suárez also gained a reputation for consistently scoring acrobatic goals, often shooting off balance, or in air, or with overhead bicycle kicks. Moreover, he is an accurate free kick taker, and has also been known to take penalties.

He also creates many scoring opportunities for his teammates with his vision and great passing abilities, as is reflected in his numbers of assists, among the very highest within the stat's recorded history. Former Liverpool captain, Steven Gerrard, lauded Suárez's unselfish playstyle within his autobiography, stating how that "It's a rare combination, to be a miraculous footballer who is willing to use his gifts to selflessly assist and create goals for a teammate", as well as further writing, "He scores goals. He creates goals. He's hard and horrible to play against. You've got a chance of beating anyone in the world with Luis Suárez in your team".

In addition to being a prolific player, Suárez has often been praised for his strong mentality and desire to win. Former Liverpool teammate, Jordan Henderson dubbed Suárez as a "warrior", claiming that his attitude inspired confidence among his teammates. Meanwhile, Gerrard eulogized his drive to succeed, stating "Luis played to win a five-a-side training session like he was chasing the Champions League or the World Cup. If his team lost a kickaround he went home angry; he always needed to win that badly". Atletico Madrid coach, Diego Simeone hailed Suárez for the "desire and energy" he brought to the club. Suárez, himself, has stated that he's the kind of player who would "kill himself just to prevent a throw-in at the 90th minute." in his autobiography.

Former Ajax coach Marco van Basten criticized Suárez for his tendency to receive yellow cards. Van Basten said he had a tense relationship with Suárez, although he conceded that "Luis is unpredictable, he's hard to influence but that makes him special." At times, Suárez can be dominant but fail to convert his efforts into goals. Despite his weaknesses, Suárez's leadership stood out to Ajax management.

== Controversies ==
Suárez has been widely accused of diving. His manager, teammates and various analysts have commented that this reputation for simulation has caused referees not to award him legitimate penalties. In January 2013, Suárez admitted to diving against Stoke City in an October 2012 match. This led his manager Brendan Rodgers to comment his actions were "unacceptable" and that he would be dealt with "internally" by the club. During the 2018 World Cup game against Portugal, after collisions with Portuguese players, Suárez twice acted like he had a head injury despite his head having been untouched.

During the 2010 FIFA World Cup, in the quarter-final against Ghana, during extra time, Ghana's Stephen Appiah's shot was heading to what could have been a goal. Suárez then blocked Dominic Adiyiah's goal bound header with his hands. He was sent off for a handball. Ghana could have proceeded to the semi-finals of the tournament, had the subsequent penalty been converted.

Suárez is notorious for biting opponents on multiple occasions. In a Group D matchup at the 2014 FIFA World Cup, Suárez was shown to have bitten Italian defender Giorgio Chiellini, resulting in FIFA suspending Suárez from all football activities for 4 months. While playing for Liverpool, Suarez bit Chelsea player Branislav Ivanović in a Premier League match, and was punished with a ten match ban. In an earlier incident while playing for AFC Ajax he was caught biting PSV Eindhoven player Otman Bakkal and was suspended for seven games. Suárez has also been accused of stamping on opponents in the Premier League and the UEFA Europa League.

Due to his diving, biting, stamping, and other antics, Suárez has been frequently labelled as a pest and a cheat. In December 2013, Spanish football website El Gol Digital ranked Suárez at fifth in its list of the world's dirtiest footballers.

After Inter Miami's 3–0 loss to the Seattle Sounders in the 2025 Leagues Cup final, Suárez was seen stomping on the foot of, and spitting in the face of Sounders security director Gene Ramirez, which was widely condemned. Suárez was fined by the Leagues Cup Organizing Committee and handed a six game suspension from the competition for the incident, and was additionally given a three match suspension by Major League Soccer.

== Media and sponsorship ==
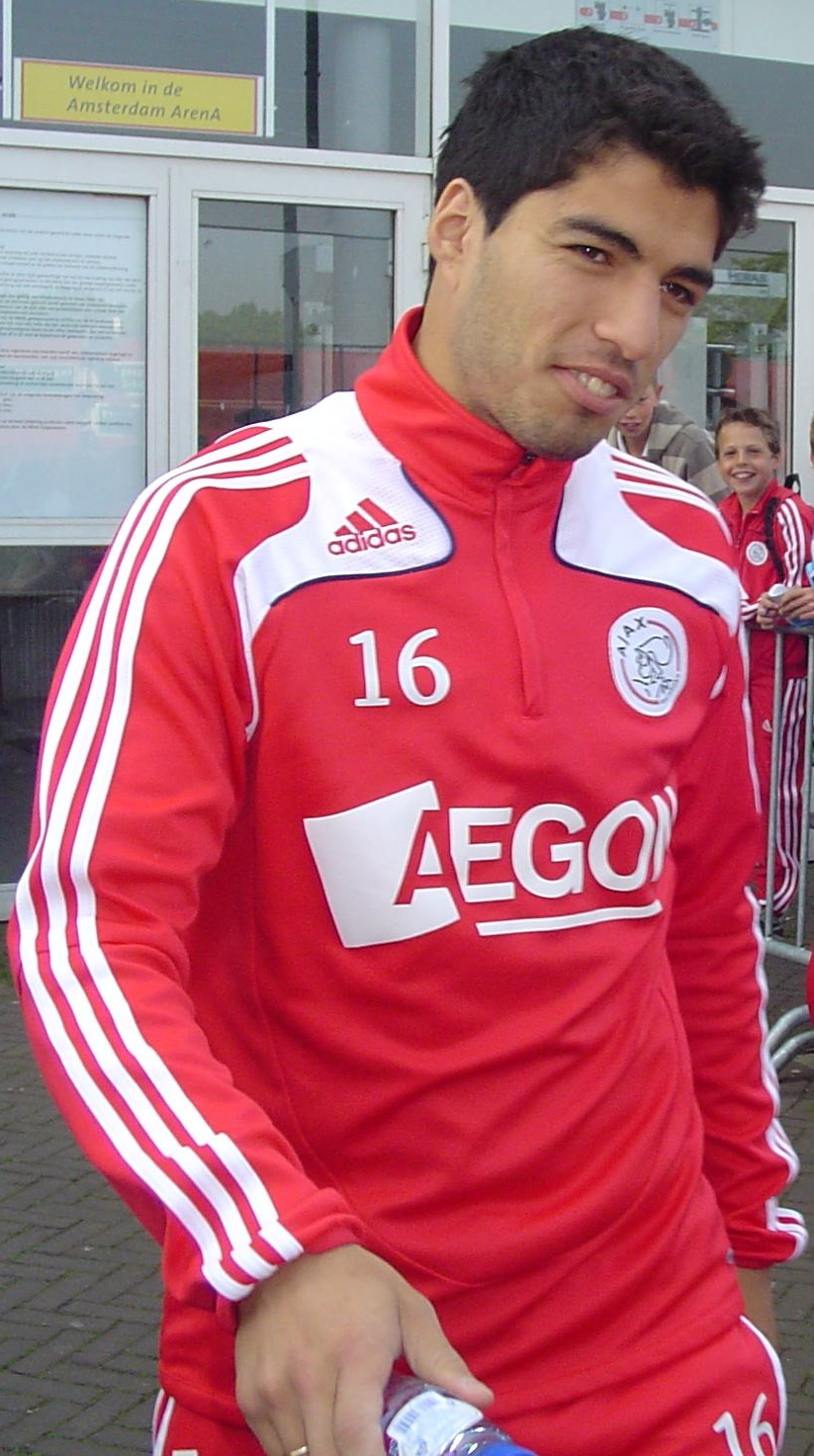
Previously with Adidas, Suárez has been sponsored by Puma since 2018. He wears Puma Future 2.1.

Suárez had a sponsorship deal with German sportswear and equipment supplier Adidas, before switching to rivals Puma in 2018. Suárez starred in a 2014 advert for Beats with other global football stars including Neymar and Thierry Henry, with the theme of "The Game Before the Game" and the players' pre-game ritual of listening to music. In Uruguay, Suárez has also appeared in advertisements for Abitab, Antel, Cablevisión, Garnier, Pepsi and Samsung.

Suárez features in EA Sports' FIFA video game series: as a result of Suárez's ban for his bite on Giorgio Chiellini at the 2014 World Cup, players in FIFA 15 were unable to select Suárez until his ban ended on 26 October.

Active on social media, Suárez has over 40 million Instagram followers as of May 2020, the most for a person from Uruguay.

== Business ventures ==
In March 2025, Suárez and teammate Lionel Messi started a new football club project, Deportivo LSM. The new team will focus on football training.

== Personal life ==
Suárez was born in Salto, Uruguay to Sandra Diaz and Rodolfo Suárez, the fourth of seven boys. His oldest brother, Paolo Suárez, is a Uruguayan-Salvadoran retired professional footballer, who last played for Isidro Metapán in El Salvador.

Suárez moved with his family to Montevideo when he was seven, and his parents separated when he was nine. In Montevideo, he developed his football skills on the streets, while also taking up work as a street sweeper at the age of 15. In 1998, aged 11 he appeared as a contestant on children's game show Aventujuegos, with his team winning: his episode was brought up in a 2011 episode of chat show Noche de Locura and he was surprised the footage had been kept.

The contrast between his life in Europe and the poverty he left behind has been cited as contributing to his periodic aggression on the field, as well as being a possible explanation for the more forgiving attitudes of the Uruguayan public and press towards such cases, compared to Europe. Besides his native tongue of Spanish, Suárez is able to speak Dutch and English.

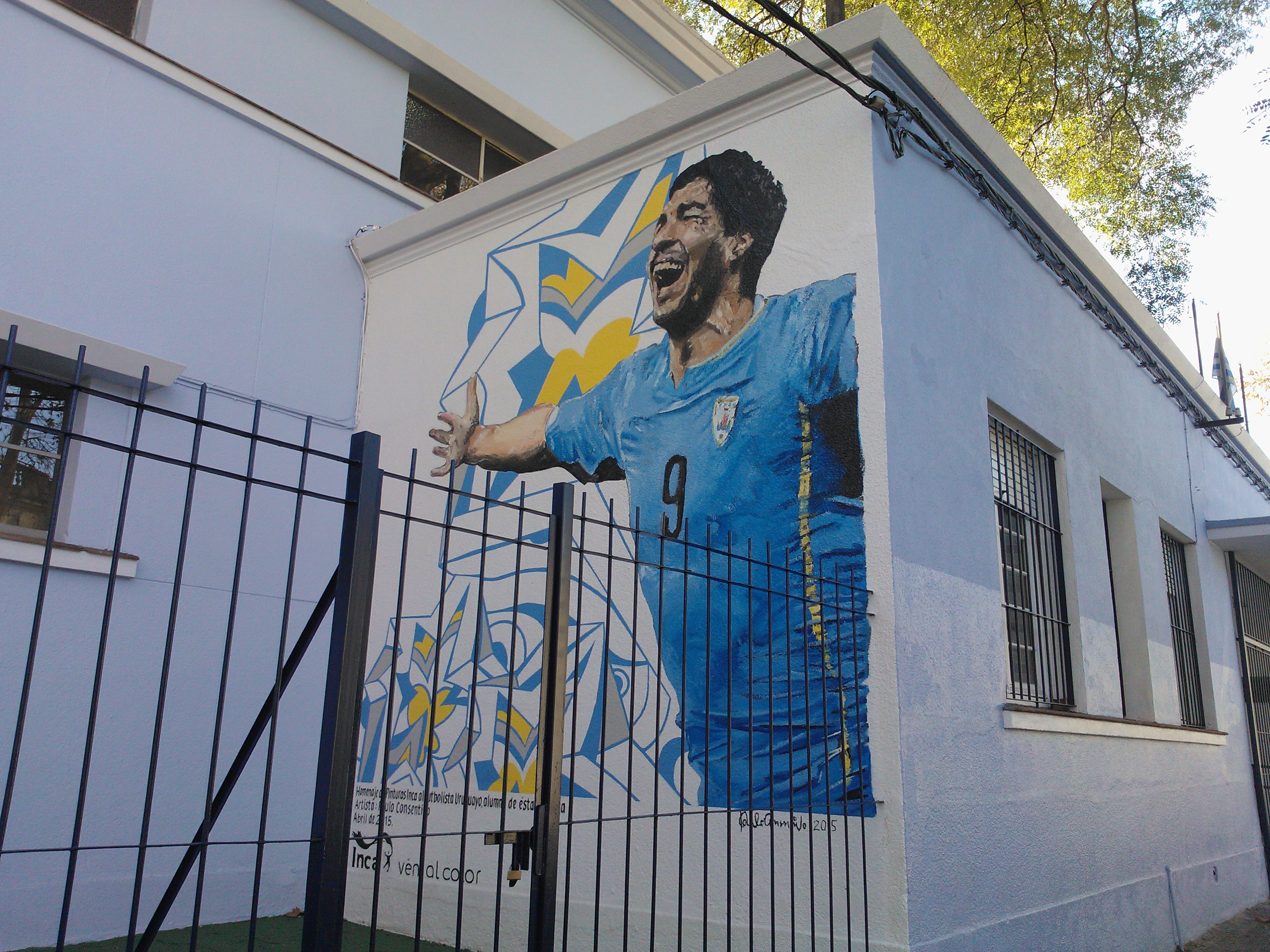
Mural of Suárez on his former school in Montevideo, Uruguay

Suárez is of mixed race and has a black grandfather. The matter of ethnicity was raised in reporting on the Patrice Evra incident, where use by his grandmother, Lila Piriz, of "mi negrito" as a sobriquet has been offered to explain Suárez's repeated use of "negro" over the two-minute altercation; the FA judged his evidence unreliable, issuing him an eight-match ban. His mother also supported the claim Suárez made that using the word was not racist in Uruguay. She said it was "normal", and that it was "a word people use with their friends. It's like calling someone fat, thin or whatever."

Suárez began dating Sofía Balbi at age 15 in Montevideo; the Balbi family moved to Barcelona in 2003, and Suárez's focus on football strengthened as a result as he wanted to follow them to Europe to join Sofía again. Suárez married her in 2009, and the couple have a daughter (born 2010) and two sons (born 2013 and 2019). He has a tattoo of his daughter's name Delfina on his wrist which he kisses as part of his goal celebration – this celebration routine is featured in EA Sports' video game FIFA 15 as "Kiss the Wrist". In 2014, Suárez joined Barcelona, allowing him to live closer to Sofía's family. On the move, Suárez said, "[Liverpool] did all they could to get me to stay, but playing and living in Spain, where my wife's family live, is a lifelong dream and ambition. I believe now the timing is right." In 2014, Suárez released his autobiography, Crossing the Line – My Story.

Suárez, who is married to an Italian citizen, was eligible to take a B1 Italian Language exam and flew to Perugia in September 2020 to take the test and gain Italian citizenship. Though obtaining the results of the language exam and approval of citizenship takes several months and several years respectively to be processed, Suárez reportedly got his language exam results within hours and would have his citizenship approved in several weeks. The Italian media had noted that this led to accusations of special treatment against Suárez, especially as Italian laws had been changed in 2018 to make obtaining citizenship by marriage more difficult. In September 2020, an investigation was launched over accusations that he had cheated his way into gaining Italian citizenship.

It is known that Suárez has used his experience and knowledge to mentor new Uruguayan footballing talents, most notably Darwin Núñez.

Suárez is a devout Catholic.

=== Pandora Papers ===
He is among the 13 sports personalities mentioned in the Pandora Papers published by the International Consortium of Investigative Journalists (ICIJ).

== Career statistics ==
=== Club ===
As of match played 21 November 2026

Appearances and goals by club, season and competition
Club	Season	League			National cup (Note: Includes KNVB Cup, FA Cup, Copa del Rey, Copa do Brasil)		League cup (Note: Includes Football League Cup)		Continental		Other		Total	
Club	Season	Division	Apps	Goals	Apps	Goals	Apps	Goals	Apps	Goals	Apps	Goals	Apps	Goals
Nacional	2005	Uruguayan Primera División	0	0	—		—		1 (Note: Appearance(s) in Copa Libertadores)	0	—		1	0
Nacional	2005–06	Uruguayan Primera División	27	10	—		—		3	0	4 (Note: Appearances in Uruguayan Primera División play-offs)	2	34	12
Nacional	Total		27	10	—		—		4	0	4	2	35	12
Groningen	2006–07	Eredivisie	29	10	2	1	—		2 (Note: Appearances in UEFA Cup)	1	4 (Note: Appearances in Eredivisie play-offs)	3	37	15
Ajax	2007–08	Eredivisie	33	17	3	2	—		4 (Note: Two appearances and one goal in UEFA Champions League, two appearances in UEFA Cup)	1	4	2	44	22
Ajax	2008–09	Eredivisie	31	22	2	1	—		10	5	—		43	28
Ajax	2009–10	Eredivisie	33	35	6	8	—		9 (Note: Appearances in UEFA Europa League)	6	—		48	49
Ajax	2010–11	Eredivisie	13	7	1	1	—		9 (Note: Appearances in UEFA Champions League)	4	1 (Note: Appearance in Johan Cruyff Shield)	0	24	12
Ajax	Total		110	81	12	12	—		32	16	5	2	159	111
Liverpool	2010–11	Premier League	13	4	—		—		0	0	—		13	4
Liverpool	2011–12	Premier League	31	11	4	3	4	3	—		—		39	17
Liverpool	2012–13	Premier League	33	23	2	2	1	1	8	4	—		44	30
Liverpool	2013–14	Premier League	33	31	3	0	1	0	—		—		37	31
Liverpool	Total		110	69	9	5	6	4	8	4	—		133	82
Barcelona	2014–15	La Liga	27	16	6	2	—		10	7	—		43	25
Barcelona	2015–16	La Liga	35	40	4	5	—		9	8	5 (Note: One appearance and one goal in UEFA Super Cup, two appearances in Supercopa de España, two appearances and five goals in FIFA Club World Cup)	6	53	59
Barcelona	2016–17	La Liga	35	29	6	4	—		9	3	1 (Note: Appearance(s) in Supercopa de España)	1	51	37
Barcelona	2017–18	La Liga	33	25	6	5	—		10	1	2	0	51	31
Barcelona	2018–19	La Liga	33	21	5	3	—		10	1	1	0	49	25
Barcelona	2019–20	La Liga	28	16	0	0	—		7	5	1	0	36	21
Barcelona	Total		191	147	27	19	—		55	25	10	7	283	198
Atlético Madrid	2020–21	La Liga	32	21	0	0	—		6	0	—		38	21
Atlético Madrid	2021–22	La Liga	35	11	2	1	—		7	1	1	0	45	13
Atlético Madrid	Total		67	32	2	1	—		13	1	1	0	83	34
Nacional	2022	Uruguayan Primera División	14	8	0	0	—		2 (Note: Appearances in Copa Sudamericana)	0	—		16	8
Grêmio	2023	Série A	33	17	8	2	—		—		13 (Note: Twelve appearances and seven goals in Campeonato Gaúcho, one appearance and three goals in Recopa Gaúcha)	10	54	29
Inter Miami	2024	MLS	27	20	—		—		4 (Note: Appearance(s) in CONCACAF Champions Cup)	2	6 (Note: Three appearances and two goals in Leagues Cup, three appearances and one goal in MLS Cup playoffs)	3	37	25
Inter Miami	2025	MLS	28	10	—		—		8	3	14 (Note: Four appearances and one goal in FIFA Club World Cup, six appearances and three goals in Leagues Cup, four appearances in MLS Cup playoffs)	4	50	17
Inter Miami	2026	MLS	30	17	—		—		1	0	2 (Note: One appearance in Campeones Cup, one appearance in MLS Cup playoffs)	0	33	17
Inter Miami	Total		85	47	—		—		13	5	22	7	120	59
Career total			665	421	60	40	6	4	129	52	59	31	920	548

=== International ===
Appearances and goals by national team and year
National team	Year	Apps	Goals
Uruguay	2007	6	2
Uruguay	2008	10	4
Uruguay	2009	12	3
Uruguay	2010	11	7
Uruguay	2011	13	10
Uruguay	2012	8	4
Uruguay	2013	16	9
Uruguay	2014	6	5
Uruguay	2015	0	0
Uruguay	2016	8	3
Uruguay	2017	5	2
Uruguay	2018	11	6
Uruguay	2019	7	4
Uruguay	2020	3	4
Uruguay	2021	12	2
Uruguay	2022	9	3
Uruguay	2023	1	0
Uruguay	2024	5	1
Total		143	69

== Honours ==
Nacional

- Uruguayan Primera División: 2005–06, 2022

Ajax

- Eredivisie: 2010–11
- KNVB Cup: 2009–10

Liverpool

- Football League Cup: 2011–12
- FA Cup runner-up: 2011–12

Barcelona

- La Liga: 2014–15, 2015–16, 2017–18, 2018–19
- Copa del Rey: 2014–15, 2015–16, 2016–17, 2017–18; runner-up: 2018–19
- Supercopa de España: 2016, 2018
- UEFA Champions League: 2014–15
- UEFA Super Cup: 2015
- FIFA Club World Cup: 2015

Atlético Madrid

- La Liga: 2020–21

Grêmio

- Campeonato Gaúcho: 2023
- Recopa Gaúcha: 2023

Inter Miami

- MLS Cup: 2025
- Supporters' Shield: 2024
- Campeones Cup: 2026

Uruguay

- Copa América: 2011; third place: 2024

Individual

- FIFA World Cup All-Star Team: 2010
- Dutch Footballer of the Year: 2009–10
- Eredivisie Golden Boot: 2009–10
- IFFHS World's Best Top Division Goalscorer: 2010, 2014, 2016
- Copa América Best Player: 2011
- Copa América Team Of The Tournament: 2011
- Premier League Player of the Month: December 2013, March 2014
- European Golden Shoe: 2013–14, 2015–16
- Premier League Player of the Season: 2013–14
- Premier League Golden Boot: 2013–14
- PFA Team of the Year: 2012–13 Premier League, 2013–14 Premier League
- PFA Fans' Player of the Year: 2013–14
- PFA Players' Player of the Year: 2013–14
- FWA Footballer of the Year: 2013–14
- FSF Player of the Year: 2013–14
- Trofeo EFE: 2014–15, 2020–21
- Trofeo Alfredo Di Stéfano: 2020–21
- UEFA Men's Player of the Year Award runner-up: 2014–15
- UEFA Champions League Squad of the Season: 2014–15, 2015–16
- L'Équipe World Team: 2015
- UEFA La Liga Team of The Season: 2015–16, 2016–17
- ESM Team of the Year: 2013–14, 2014–15, 2015–16
- FIFA Club World Cup Golden Ball: 2015
- FIFA Club World Cup Golden Boot: 2015
- FIFA Club World Cup MVP of the Final Match Trophy: 2015
- La Liga Pichichi Trophy: 2015–16
- La Liga Best World Player: 2015–16
- La Liga top assist provider: 2015–16, 2016–17, 2017–18
- La Liga Player of the Month: May 2016, December 2017, October 2018, December 2019
- FIFA FIFPro World11: 2016
- Ajax Player of the Year (Rinus Michels Award): 2008–09, 2009–10
- Liverpool Player of the Season: 2012–13, 2013–14
- Liverpool Players' Player of the Season: 2013–14
- Liverpool Goal of the Season: 2013–14
- Barcelona Player of the Season (Trofeo Aldo Rovira): 2015–16
- WhoScored Player of the Season in Europe (performance data by Opta): 2013–14
- WhoScored Liverpool Player of the Decade: 2019
- WhoScored Liverpool Team of the Decade: 2019
- WhoScored Highest Rated Premier League Forward since 2009–10 (Note: Suárez led the list of the highest-rated Premier League forwards since WhoScored.com began tracking data in 2009–10, with a score of 7.87.)
- Uruguayan Primera División Team of the Season: 2022
- IFFHS Uruguayan Men's Dream Team
- Campeonato Gaúcho Team of the Year: 2023
- Bola de Ouro: 2023
- Bola de Prata: 2023
- Troféu Mesa Redonda Best Player: 2023
- MLS Player of the Month: February/March 2024
- MLS All-Star: 2024

== See also ==
- List of men's footballers with 1,000 or more official appearances
- List of top international men's football goalscorers by country
- List of men's footballers with 100 or more international caps
- List of men's footballers with 50 or more international goals
- List of international goals scored by Luis Suárez
- List of footballers with 500 or more goals
- List of FIFA World Cup top goalscorers
