= Downed opponent =

Combatant on the ground (i.e. non-standing)

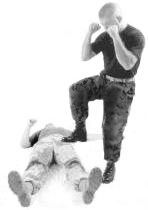
A marine stomping a downed opponent.

A downed opponent (also called a grounded opponent) is a combatant that is on the ground, as compared to a combatant that is in a standing position. This commonly implies that the downed combatant is lying on the ground, but can technically refer to any position in which anything except the soles of the combatants feet are touching the ground. In many combat sports featuring striking, such as boxing or taekwondo, it is illegal to strike a downed opponent. The referee will promptly bring the downed opponent to his or her feet to resume the bout standing. The only combat sport which allows strikes when the opponent is down is mixed martial arts. The majority of MMA organizations follow the common rule of prohibiting knee strikes and kicks to the head of a grounded opponent, but fighters are allowed to strike their opponent's body. Hand and elbow strikes to the head are considered legal.

There are many MMA organizations that still follow the roots of MMA which is no-holds-barred fighting. Brazil, Japan and Russia are the three main countries that allow soccer kicks to the face/head when the opponent is down as well as knees to the head of a downed opponent.

Pride Fighting Championship was the first large organization which adopted soccer kicks, knees and stomps to the face/head of downed opponent.
