= Stomp (strike) =

Mixed martial arts illegal technique

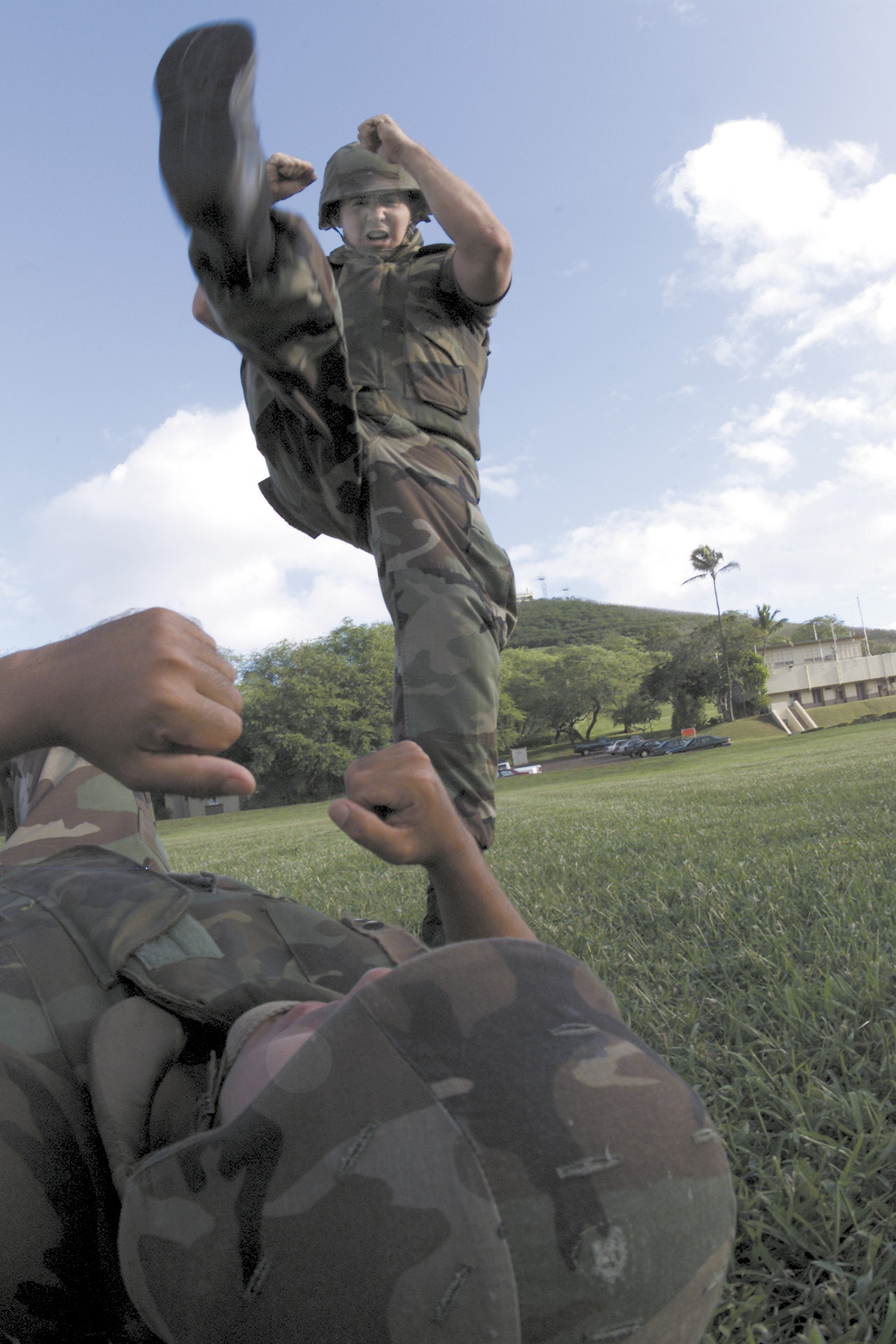
US Marines practicing the axe stomp.

A stomp (also called a stamp) is a downwards strike with the heel of the foot from the stand-up position, and is usually directed at the head or body of a downed opponent. A stomp similar to an axe kick is referred to as an axe stomp, while a particularly powerful jumping stomp with both heels is called a bronco kick, and a stomp from the clinch directed at the opponent's foot is called a foot stomp or a heel stomp.

== Use in combat sports ==
Stomping is disallowed in most combat sports. Certain mixed martial arts organizations do, however, allow stomping to different extents. The Ultimate Fighting Championship allows stomps to be performed from the clinch, while stomping on a downed opponent is considered illegal. Although now defunct as a promotion, PRIDE FC rules allowed competitors to stomp on a downed opponent, either to the head or body. Singapore-based ONE Fighting Championship, whose set of rules is essentially a combination of UFC and PRIDE rules, does allow stomps on limbs and trunk of a downed opponent, but not to the head.

Stomping is also illegal in football sports, as well as ice hockey.

== Use in video games ==
Stomping is commonly featured as a primary means of attack in platformers, in which the character's jumping ability is often exaggerated to the point that the character can stomp an enemy's head while it is standing up. A prime example of this is the Mario series, where the technique is the signature move of the franchise's titular hero.

Stomping is also a common attack in sandbox and open world games such as the Grand Theft Auto series, where it is most often used to kill a downed opponent in melee combat.

In beat 'em ups such as the Yakuza series, stomps are a common special move used to damage or finish off enemies that have been knocked down.

In the Halo video game series, there are assassinations that the players can use on various enemies that include stomping on the enemy's heads, generally resulting in the kill unless interrupted mid-session. An example would be the "Get Low" assassination in Halo 5: Guardians, where the player will step on the opponent's left leg and stomping on the enemy's head as the opponent is on their knees facing up.

In the Gears of War franchise, both COG troopers and Locusts can perform an execution on downed enemies, leading to a head stomp that completely crushes the Skull in an over-the-top gory mess.

This is also commonly found in the survival horror genre, one particular example being Dead Space and later games in the Resident Evil series, used to finish off downed enemies by destroying their particularly squishy heads. This keeps with the lore that a zombie must be dealt with by damaging the brain, and is often encouraged as a means to conserve ammunition and resources. Another example would be in The Last of Us where the character can finish off enemies by performing a brutal stomp to the head.

== See also ==
- Soccer kick
- Ground and pound
