= List of Portsmouth F.C. seasons =

This is a list of seasons played by Portsmouth Football Club in English and European football, from 1899 (the year of the club's first FA Cup entry and elected straight into the first division of the Southern League) to the most recent completed season. Football was played in the city of Portsmouth from the 1850s and was popular for sailors and dockers to play in the city. The current club was founded in 1898 with John Brickwood, owner of the local brewery, as chairman, and Frank Brettell as the club's first manager.

Portsmouth Performances from 1920 until 2023

A common myth is that the club's first goalkeeper was Sir Arthur Conan Doyle. While Conan Doyle did play as AC Smith for an amateur side, Portsmouth Association Football Club, that flourished from 1883 to 1896, the first goalkeeper of the professional era was Matt Reilly who previously played for the successful Royal Artillery team.

Portsmouth F.C. were formed on 5 April 1898 and coincidentally "replaced" the Royal Artillery Portsmouth club which had "retired" in 1899 after a professionalism scandal. Portsmouth were unusually elected straight into the first division of the Southern League, replacing Royal Artillery Portsmouth (who themselves had replaced the Southampton-based Freemantle F.C. in the 1897-98 season).

Portsmouth F.C.'s first ever league match was played at Chatham Town on 2 September 1899 (a 1–0 victory), followed three days later by the first match at Fratton Park against local rivals Southampton. That first season was hugely successful, with the club winning 20 out of 28 league matches, earning them runners-up spot in the Southern League. The league was won for the first time in the 1901–02 season, by which time Brettell had been replaced by club captain Bob Blyth as manager.

The 1906–07 season was highlighted by the visit of Manchester United to Fratton Park in the FA Cup, which generated a record attendance of 24,329. A 2–2 draw meant a replay in Manchester, and Portsmouth recorded a famous 2–1 win. However, this record attendance was surpassed two seasons later when Sheffield Wednesday visited Fratton for the second round of the new FA Cup.

1910–11 saw Portsmouth relegated, but with the recruitment of Robert Brown as manager the team were promoted the next season.

The club has won the League Championship twice, the FA Cup twice, never won the League Cup, the Charity Shield once (shared).

This list details the club's achievements in all major competitions, and the top scorers for each season. Top scorers in bold were also the top scorers in the English league that season. Records of competitions such as the Hampshire Senior Cup are not included due to them being considered of less importance than the FA Cup and the League Cup.

== Non-Football League era ==
Season	League									FA Cup	Top goalscorer(s)	
Season	Division	P	W	D	L	GF	GA	Pts	Pos	FA Cup	Name(s)	Goals
1899–1900	SL Div 1	28	20	1	7	58	27	41	2nd	R1		
1900–01	SL Div 1	28	17	4	7	56	32	38	3rd	INT		
1901–02	SL Div 1	30	20	7	3	67	24	47	**1st**	QF		
1902–03	SL Div 1	30	17	7	6	69	32	41	3rd	R1		
1903–04	SL Div 1	34	17	8	9	41	38	42	4th	R1		
1904–05	SL Div 1	34	16	4	14	61	56	36	8th	R2		
1905–06	SL Div 1	34	17	9	8	61	35	43	3rd	R1		
1906–07	SL Div 1	38	22	7	9	64	36	51	2nd	R2		
1907–08	SL Div 1	38	17	6	15	63	52	40	9th	R3		
1908–09	SL Div 1	40	18	10	12	68	60	46	4th	R2		
1909–10	SL Div 1	42	20	7	15	70	63	47	6th	R2		
1910–11	SL Div 1	38	8	11	19	34	53	27	20th	R1		
1911–12	SL Div 2	26	19	3	4	73	20	41	2nd	R2		
1912–13	SL Div 1	38	14	8	16	41	49	36	11th	R1		
1913–14	SL Div 1	38	14	12	12	57	48	40	9th	R1		
1914–15	SL Div 1	38	16	10	12	54	42	42	7th	R1		
No competitive football was played between 1915 and 1919 due to the First World War
1919–20	SL Div 1	42	23	12	7	73	27	58	**1st**	R1		

=== Non-Football League era (Western League) ===
Season	League									Top goalscorer	
Season	Division	P	W	D	L	F	A	Pts	Pos	Name	Goals
1900–01	Division 1	16	11	2	3	26	22	24	**1st**		
1901–02	Division 1	16	13	1	2	53	16	27	**1st**		
1902–03	Division 1	16	10	4	2	34	14	24	**1st**		
1903–04	Division 1	16	7	2	7	24	22	16	4th		
1904–05	Division 1	20	10	3	7	29	30	23	4th		
1905–06	Division 1	20	6	7	7	26	29	19	7th		
1906–07	Division 1 'B'	10	4	2	4	16	19	10	3rd		
1907–08	Division 1 'A'	12	7	1	4	25	13	1	2nd		
1908–09	Division 1 'B'	12	5	2	5	21	21	12	4th		

== Football League era ==
Season	League									FA Cup	EFL Cup	Europe/Other		Top goalscorer(s)	
Season	Division	P	W	D	L	GF	GA	Pts	Pos	FA Cup	EFL Cup	Europe/Other		Name(s)	Goals
1920–21	Div 3	42	12	15	15	46	48	49	12th	R1				Frank Stringfellow	13
1921–22	Div 3(S)	42	18	17	7	62	39	53	3rd	R4				Percy Cherrett	22
1922–23	Div 3(S)	42	19	8	15	58	52	46	7th	R1				Jerry Mackie	10
1923–24	Div 3(S)	42	24	11	7	87	30	59	**1st**	R2				Willie Haines	28
1924–25	Div 2	42	15	18	9	58	50	48	4th	R2				Willie Haines; Jerry Mackie	17
1925–26	Div 2	42	17	10	15	79	74	44	11th	R3				Willie Haines	20
1926–27	Div 2	42	23	8	11	87	49	54	2nd	R4				Willie Haines	40
1927–28	Div 1	42	16	7	19	66	90	39	20th	R3				Willie Haines; Jack Smith	11
1928–29	Div 1	42	15	6	21	56	80	36	20th	RU				Jack Smith	9
1929–30	Div 1	42	15	10	17	66	62	47	13th	R4				Jack Weddle	21
1930–31	Div 1	42	18	13	11	84	64	49	4th	R5				Jimmy Easson	29
1931–32	Div 1	42	19	7	16	62	62	45	8th	R5				Jack Weddle	22
1932–33	Div 1	42	18	7	17	74	76	43	9th	R3				Jack Weddle	20
1933–34	Div 1	42	15	12	15	52	55	42	10th	RU				Jack Weddle	17
1934–35	Div 1	42	15	10	17	71	72	40	14th	R4				Jack Weddle	24
1935–36	Div 1	42	17	8	17	54	67	42	10th	R3				Jack Weddle	16
1936–37	Div 1	42	17	10	15	62	66	44	9th	R3				Cliff Parker	12
1937–38	Div 1	42	13	12	17	62	68	38	19th	R4				Jimmy Beattie	21
1938–39	Div 1	42	12	13	17	47	70	37	17th	**W**				Jock Anderson	10
1939–40 (Note: The 1939–40 season was abandoned in early September and all results annulled.)	Div 1	3	1	0	2	3	5	2	18th	— (Note: Held The FA Cup the longest because of World War II and beat Sheffield United's record of 5 years because of World War I.)		FA Charity Shield	— (Note: The 1939 FA Charity Shield was not held due to the outbreak of the Second World War.)	—N/a	
No competitive football was played between 1939 and 1946 due to the Second World War
1945–46	n/a (Note: The FA Cup was contested in 1945–46 but the Football League did not resume until the following season. They had the Football League South.)									R3					
1946–47	Div 1	42	16	9	17	66	60	41	12th	R4				Duggie Reid	29
1947–48	Div 1	42	19	7	16	68	50	45	8th	R4				Duggie Reid	15
1948–49	Div 1	42	25	8	9	84	42	58	**1st**	SF				Peter Harris	22
1949–50	Div 1	42	22	9	11	74	38	53	**1st**	R5		FA Charity Shield	**W** (Note: From 1939 to 1993, in the event of a draw, the Charity Shield would be shared between the two competing teams, with each team having possession of the trophy for six months. Shared with Wolverhampton Wanderers after drawing 1–1 at Highbury.)	Ike Clarke	20
1950–51	Div 1	42	16	15	11	71	68	47	7th	R3		FA Charity Shield	— (Note: Should have played Arsenal because they won the FA Cup. However, the match was contested between an England World Cup XI and the FA Canadian Touring Team.)	Ike Clarke; Len Phillips	11
1951–52	Div 1	42	20	8	14	68	58	48	4th	QF				Duggie Reid	18
1952–53	Div 1	42	14	10	18	74	83	38	15th	R3				Peter Harris	23
1953–54	Div 1	42	14	11	17	81	89	39	14th	R5				Peter Harris	24
1954–55	Div 1	42	18	12	12	74	62	48	3rd	R3				Peter Harris	23
1955–56	Div 1	42	16	9	17	78	85	41	12th	R4				Peter Harris	24
1956–57	Div 1	42	10	13	19	62	92	33	19th	R4				Johnny Gordon; Peter Harris	13
1957–58	Div 1	42	12	8	22	73	88	32	20th	R4				Peter Harris	18
1958–59	Div 1	42	6	9	27	64	112	21	22nd	R5				Ron Saunders	24
1959–60	Div 2	42	10	12	20	59	77	32	20th	R3				Ron Saunders	17
1960–61	Div 2	42	11	11	20	64	91	33	21st	R5	QF			Ron Saunders	23
1961–62	Div 3	46	27	11	8	87	47	65	**1st**	R1	R3			Ron Saunders	26
1962–63	Div 2	42	13	11	18	63	79	37	16th	R4	R4			Ron Saunders	29
1963–64	Div 2	42	16	11	15	79	70	43	9th	R3	R4			Ron Saunders	**34**
1964–65	Div 2	42	12	10	20	56	77	34	20th	R3	R3			Cliff Portwood	12
1965–66	Div 2	42	16	8	18	74	78	40	12th	R3	R3			Albert McCann	13
1966–67	Div 2	42	13	13	16	59	70	39	14th	R4	R2			Albert McCann	14
1967–68	Div 2	42	18	13	11	68	55	49	5th	R5	R3			Albert McCann	16
1968–69	Div 2	42	12	14	16	58	58	38	15th	R4	R2			Ray Hiron	17
1969–70	Div 2	42	13	9	20	66	80	35	17th	R3	R1			Ray Hiron	18
1970–71	Div 2	46	10	14	18	46	61	34	16th	R4	R3			Ray Hiron	14
1971–72	Div 2	46	12	13	17	59	68	37	16th	R5	R1			Richie Reynolds	11
1972–73	Div 2	42	12	11	19	42	59	35	17th	R3	R2			Ray Hiron	10
1973–74	Div 2	42	14	12	16	45	62	40	15th	R5	R2			Ron Davies	16
1974–75	Div 2	42	12	13	17	44	54	37	17th	R3	R2			Mick Mellows	8
1975–76	Div 2	42	9	7	26	32	61	25	22nd	R4	R2			Norman Piper	12
1976–77	Div 3	46	11	14	21	53	70	36	20th	R3	R1			David Kemp	17
1977–78	Div 3	42	7	17	22	41	75	31	24th	R2	R3			David Kemp	21
1978–79	Div 4	46	20	12	14	62	48	52	7th	R2	R1			Jeff Hemmerman	16
1979–80	Div 4	46	24	12	10	91	49	60	4th	R3	R1			**Colin Garwood**	**27** (Note: Played for Aldershot Town and Portsmouth in the same season but scored 10 goals for Aldershot and 17 goals for Portsmouth.)
1980–81	Div 3	46	22	9	15	55	47	53	6th	R1	R4			David Gregory	15
1981–82	Div 3	46	14	19	13	56	51	61 (Note: The 1981–82 season saw the introduction of three points for a win.)	13th	R1	R2			Billy Rafferty	19
1982–83	Div 3	46	27	10	9	74	41	91	**1st**	R2	R1			Alan Biley	27
1983–84	Div 2	42	14	7	21	73	64	49	16th	R4	R2			Mark Hateley	25
1984–85	Div 2	42	20	14	8	69	50	74	4th	R3	R2			Neil Webb	18
1985–86	Div 2	42	22	7	13	69	41	73	4th	R3	QF	Full Members' Cup	GS	Nicky Morgan	15
1986–87	Div 2	42	23	9	10	53	28	78	2nd	R4	R3	Full Members' Cup	QF	Micky Quinn	**28**
1987–88	Div 1	42	7	14	19	36	66	35	19th	QF	R2	Full Members' Cup	R1	Micky Quinn	11
1988–89	Div 2	46	13	12	21	45	56	40	20th	R3	R2	Full Members' Cup	R2	Micky Quinn	21
1989–90	Div 2	46	15	16	15	62	65	61	12th	R3	R2	Full Members' Cup	R2	Guy Whittingham	25
1990–91	Div 2	46	14	11	21	58	70	53	17th	R5	R3	Full Members' Cup	R2	Guy Whittingham	20
1991–92	Div 2	46	19	12	15	65	51	69	9th	SF	R3	Full Members' Cup	R1	Guy Whittingham	13
1992–93	Div 1 (Note: The 1992–93 season saw the introduction of the Premier League, so Division 1 replaced Division 2, Division 2 replaced Division 3 and Division 3 replaced Division 4.)	46	26	10	10	80	46	88	3rd	R3	R3	Anglo-Italian Cup League play-offs	GS SF	Guy Whittingham	**47** (Note: Pompey goalscoring record.)
1993–94	Div 1	46	15	13	18	52	58	58	17th	R3	QF	Anglo-Italian Cup	GS	Gerry Creaney; Alan McLoughlin	11
1994–95	Div 1	46	15	13	18	53	63	58	18th	R4	R3			Gerry Creaney	22
1995–96	Div 1	46	13	13	20	61	69	52	21st	R3	R1			Paul Hall; Alan McLoughlin	10
1996–97	Div 1	46	20	8	18	59	53	68	7th	QF	R2			Lee Bradbury	17
1997–98	Div 1	46	13	10	21	51	63	49	20th	R3	R1			John Aloisi	12
1998–99	Div 1	46	11	14	21	57	73	47	19th	R4	R2			John Aloisi	17
1999–2000	Div 1	46	13	12	21	55	66	51	18th	R3	R2			Steve Claridge	14
2000–01	Div 1	46	10	19	17	47	59	49	20th	R3	R2			Lee Bradbury; Steve Claridge	11
2001–02	Div 1	46	13	14	19	60	72	53	17th	R3	R1			Peter Crouch	19
2002–03	Div 1	46	29	11	6	97	45	98	**1st**	R3	R2			**Svetoslav Todorov**	**26**
2003–04	Prem	38	12	9	17	47	54	45	13th	QF	R4			Yakubu	19
2004–05	Prem	38	10	9	19	43	59	39	16th	R4	QF			Yakubu	17
2005–06	Prem	38	10	8	20	37	62	38	17th	R4	R2			Lomana LuaLua; Gary O'Neil; Matthew Taylor	7
2006–07	Prem	38	14	12	12	45	42	54	9th	R4	R3			Nwankwo Kanu	12
2007–08	Prem	38	16	9	13	48	40	57	8th	**W**	R4			Benjani Mwaruwari	12
2008–09	Prem	38	10	11	17	38	57	41	14th	R4	R3	FA Community Shield UEFA Cup	RU GS	Peter Crouch	16
2009–10	Prem	38	7	7	24	34	66	19 (Note: Deducted 9 points for entering administration.)	20th	RU	QF			Frédéric Piquionne	10
2010–11	Champ	46	15	13	18	53	60	58	16th	R3	R3			David Nugent	14
2011–12	Champ	46	13	11	22	50	59	40 (Note: Deducted 10 points for entering administration.)	22nd	R3	R1			David Norris	8
2012–13	Lg1	46	10	12	24	51	69	32 (Note: Deducted 10 points for exiting administration.)	24th	R1	R1	Football League Trophy	R2	Izale McLeod	11
2013–14	Lg2	46	14	17	15	56	66	59	13th	R1	R1	Football League Trophy	QF	Jed Wallace	7
2014–15	Lg2	46	14	15	17	52	54	57	16th (Note: Lowest League finish.)	R1	R2	Football League Trophy	R2	Jed Wallace	17
2015–16	Lg2	46	21	15	10	75	44	78	6th	R4	R2	Football League Trophy League play-offs	R1 SF	Marc McNulty	12
2016–17	Lg2	46	26	9	11	79	40	87	**1st**	R1	R1	EFL Trophy	GS	Kal Naismith	15
2017–18	Lg1	46	20	6	20	57	57	66	8th	R1	R1	EFL Trophy	R3	Brett Pitman	23
2018–19	Lg1	46	25	13	8	83	51	88	4th	R4	R1	EFL Trophy League play-offs	**W** SF	Jamal Lowe	15
2019–20	Lg1	35	17	9	9	53	36	60	5th (Note: The 2019–20 season was curtailed due to the COVID-19 pandemic, with league positions decided on a points-per-game basis. Portsmouth averaged 1.71 points from 35 games.)	R5	R3	EFL Trophy League play-offs	RU SF	Ronan Curtis	11
2020–21	Lg1	46	21	9	16	65	51	72	8th	R3	R2	EFL Trophy	R3	John Marquis	9
2021–22	Lg1	46	20	13	13	68	51	73	10th	R2	R1	EFL Trophy	R3	Marcus Harness	11
2022–23	Lg1	46	17	19	10	61	50	70	8th	R3	R2	EFL Trophy	QF	Colby Bishop	20
2023–24	Lg1	46	28	13	5	78	41	97	**1st**	R1	R2	EFL Trophy	R2	Colby Bishop	21
2024–25	Champ	46	14	12	20	58	71	54	16th	R3	R1			Colby Bishop	11
2025–26	Champ	46	14	13	19	49	64	55	18th	R3	R1			Adrian Segečić	11

== Key ==
- P = Played
- W = Games won
- D = Games drawn
- L = Games lost
- GF = Goals for
- GA = Goals against
- Pts = Points
- Pos = Final position
- Div 1 = Football League First Division
- Div 2 = Football League Second Division
- Div 3 = Football League Third Division
- Div 3(S) = Football League Third Division South
- Div 4 = Football League Fourth Division
- Prem = Premier League
- Champ = EFL Championship
- Lg1 = EFL League One
- Lg2 = EFL League Two
- n/a = Not applicable
- INT = Intermediate Round
- GS = Group Stage
- R1 = Round 1
- R2 = Round 2
- R3 = Round 3
- R4 = Round 4
- R5 = Round 5
- QF = Quarter-Finals
- SF = Semi-Finals
- RU = Runners-up
- W = Winners

Champions	Runners-up	Promoted	Relegated

Note: bold text indicates a competition won.
Note 2: Where fields are left blank, the club did not participate in a competition that season.
