= 1995–96 Portsmouth F.C. season =

Portsmouth
1995–96 season
- Manager: Terry Fenwick
- Stadium: Fratton Park
- Football League First Division: 21st
- FA Cup: Third round
- League Cup: First round
- Top goalscorer: Hall/McLoughlin (10)
- Highest home attendance: 14,434 vs. Derby County (16 September 1995)
- Lowest home attendance: 6,002 vs. Oldham Athletic (2 December 1995)
- Average home league attendance: 9,406

During the 1995–96 English football season, Portsmouth F.C. competed in the Football League First Division.

== Season summary ==
In Terry Fenwick's first full season in charge of Portsmouth, after replace former manager Jim Smith, relegation to Division Two was avoided on the last day of the 1995–96 season (on goal difference) when Pompey won away at Huddersfield Town while other results went the club's way.

== Final league table ==
Pos	Team	Pld	W	D	L	GF	GA	GD	Pts	Qualification or relegation
19	Reading	46	13	17	16	54	63	−9	56	
20	Wolverhampton Wanderers	46	13	16	17	56	62	−6	55	
21	Portsmouth	46	13	13	20	61	69	−8	52	
22	Millwall (R)	46	13	13	20	43	63	−20	52	Relegation to the Second Division
23	Watford (R)	46	10	18	18	62	70	−8	48	Relegation to the Second Division

Rules for classification: 1) Points; 2) Goals scored; 3) Goal difference
(R) Relegated

== Results ==
Portsmouth's score comes first

=== Legend ===
Win	Draw	Loss

=== Football League First Division ===
Date	Opponent	Venue	Result	Attendance	Scorers
12 August 1995	Southend United	H	4–2	10,630	Creaney (2), Rees, Tilson (own goal)
19 August 1995	Grimsby Town	A	1–2	4,515	McLoughlin (pen)
26 August 1995	Reading	H	0–0	9,917	
30 August 1995	Leicester City	A	2–4	15,170	Hall, Creaney (pen)
2 September 1995	Millwall	H	0–1	8,023	
9 September 1995	Port Vale	A	2–0	7,374	Burton, Griffiths (pen)
12 September 1995	Sunderland	A	1–1	12,282	McLoughlin (pen)
16 September 1995	Derby County	H	2–2	14,434	Gittens, McLoughlin
23 September 1995	Tranmere Rovers	H	0–2	11,127	
30 September 1995	Luton Town	A	1–3	7,795	Walsh
7 October 1995	Oldham Athletic	A	1–1	5,937	Simpson
14 October 1995	Birmingham City	H	0–1	10,006	
21 October 1995	West Bromwich Albion	A	1–2	16,257	McLoughlin (pen)
28 October 1995	Watford	H	4–2	7,025	Simpson, Stimson, Allen, Carter
4 November 1995	Sheffield United	A	1–4	11,281	Simpson
11 November 1995	Huddersfield Town	H	1–1	6,876	Simpson
18 November 1995	Stoke City	H	3–3	8,030	McLoughlin (2), Walsh
21 November 1995	Barnsley	A	0–0	6,187	
25 November 1995	Ipswich Town	A	2–3	10,286	Allen, Walsh
2 December 1995	Oldham Athletic	H	2–1	6,002	Allen, McLoughlin (pen)
9 December 1995	Tranmere Rovers	A	2–1	6,678	Durnin, Hall
16 December 1995	Luton Town	H	4–0	7,012	Hall (2), Carter, Walsh
23 December 1995	Norwich City	H	1–0	9,960	Durnin
26 December 1995	Charlton Athletic	A	1–2	11,686	Hall
30 December 1995	Wolverhampton Wanderers	A	2–2	25,294	Burton, Carter
1 January 1996	Crystal Palace	H	2–3	12,926	Simpson, Butters
13 January 1996	Grimsby Town	H	3–1	6,958	Walsh, Wood, Carter
20 January 1996	Southend United	A	1–2	5,560	Hall
27 January 1996	Millwall	A	1–1	7,710	Burton
4 February 1996	Reading	A	1–0	7,924	McLoughlin
10 February 1996	Leicester City	H	2–1	9,003	Burton, Hall
17 February 1996	Sunderland	H	2–2	12,241	Hall, Griffiths
24 February 1996	Derby County	A	2–3	16,120	McLoughlin (pen), Hall
2 March 1996	Charlton Athletic	H	2–1	9,323	Burton (2)
9 March 1996	Norwich City	A	1–1	13,004	Hall
16 March 1996	Wolverhampton Wanderers	H	0–2	11,732	
23 March 1996	Crystal Palace	A	0–0	17,039	
27 March 1996	Port Vale	H	1–2	6,335	Allen
30 March 1996	West Bromwich Albion	H	0–2	8,126	
2 April 1996	Birmingham City	A	0–2	14,886	
6 April 1996	Watford	A	2–1	23,789	Awford, McLoughlin
8 April 1996	Sheffield United	H	1–2	8,978	Durnin
13 April 1996	Stoke City	A	1–2	11,471	Butters
20 April 1996	Barnsley	H	0–0	8,744	
27 April 1996	Ipswich Town	H	0–1	12,954	
5 May 1996	Huddersfield Town	A	1–0	14,091	Burton

=== FA Cup ===
Round	Date	Opponent	Venue	Result	Attendance	Goalscorers
R3	7 January 1996	Southampton	A	0–3	15,236	

=== League Cup ===
Round	Date	Opponent	Venue	Result	Attendance	Goalscorers
R1 First Leg	16 August 1995	Cardiff City	H	0–2	4,203	
R1 Second Leg	22 August 1995	Cardiff City	A	0–1	4,347	

== Squad ==
Note: Flags indicate national team as defined under FIFA eligibility rules; some limited exceptions apply. Players may hold more than one non-FIFA nationality.

No.	Pos.	Nation	Player
-	GK	(England) ENG	Alan Knight
-	DF	(England) ENG	Robbie Pethick
-	DF	(England) ENG	Lee Russell
-	DF	(England) ENG	Guy Butters
-	DF	(England) ENG	Mark Stimson
-	MF	(England) ENG	Jimmy Carter
-	FW	(England) ENG	John Durnin
-	MF	(Republic of Ireland) IRL	Alan McLoughlin
-	FW	(Jamaica) JAM	Paul Hall
-	DF	(England) ENG	Andy Awford
-	FW	(Wales) WAL	Carl Griffiths
-	GK	(Estonia) EST	Mart Poom
-	MF	(Jamaica) JAM	Fitzroy Simpson
-	FW	(England) ENG	Lee Bradbury

No.	Pos.	Nation	Player
-	MF	(England) ENG	Martin Allen
-	DF	(England) ENG	Andy Thomson
-	DF	(Wales) WAL	Kit Symons
-	MF	(England) ENG	Paul Wood
-	DF	(England) ENG	Tony Dobson
-	FW	(Jamaica) JAM	Deon Burton
-	DF	(England) ENG	Jon Gittens
-	MF	(Wales) WAL	Jason Rees
-	DF	(England) ENG	Adrian Whitbread (on loan from West Ham United)
-	FW	(Scotland) SCO	Gerry Creaney
-	MF	(England) ENG	Sammy Igoe
-	DF	(England) ENG	Russell Perrett
-	FW	(England) ENG	Paul Walsh
-	DF	(England) ENG	Danny Hinshelwood
