= 1998–99 Portsmouth F.C. season =

Portsmouth
1998–99 season
- Chairman: Martin Gregory (until 18 December); Les Parris (from 18 December - 18 May 1999)
- Manager: Alan Ball
- Stadium: Fratton Park
- Football League First Division: 19th
- FA Cup: Fourth round
- Worthington Cup: Second round
- Top goalscorer: League: Aloisi (14); All: Aloisi (17)
- Highest home attendance: 19,284 vs. Crewe Alexandra (5 December 1998)
- Lowest home attendance: 8,180 vs Grimsby Town (13 December 1998)
- Average home league attendance: 13,732

During the 1998–99 English football season, Portsmouth F.C. competed in the Football League First Division.

== Season summary ==
Portsmouth's centenary season, 1998–99, saw a serious financial crisis hit the club and in December 1998, chairman Martin Gregory quit his post after being targeted of abuse from Portsmouth fans which gave him no choice but to sell his 97% ownership of the club and in February 1999, Portsmouth went into receivership. They avoided relegation again that season, and were then saved from closure by new chairman Milan Mandarić, who saved the club with a takeover deal in May 1999. The new chairman immediately started investing.

== Final league table ==
Pos	Team	Pld	W	D	L	GF	GA	GD	Pts
17	Swindon Town	46	13	11	22	59	81	−22	50
18	Crewe Alexandra	46	12	12	22	54	78	−24	48
19	Portsmouth	46	11	14	21	57	73	−16	47
20	Queens Park Rangers	46	12	11	23	52	61	−9	47
21	Port Vale	46	13	8	25	45	75	−30	47

Rules for classification: 1) Points; 2) Goals scored; 3) Goal difference

== Results ==
Portsmouth's score comes first

=== Legend ===
Win	Draw	Loss

=== Football League First Division ===
Date	Opponent	Venue	Result	Attendance	Scorers
8 August 1998	Watford	H	1–2	15,275	Aloisi
15 August 1998	Tranmere Rovers	A	1–1	6,714	Aloisi
22 August 1998	Ipswich Town	H	0–0	12,002	
29 August 1998	Huddersfield Town	A	3–3	10,085	Aloisi (2), McLoughlin (pen)
31 August 1998	Queens Park Rangers	H	3–0	12,106	Aloisi, McLoughlin, Phillips
6 September 1998	Oxford United	A	0–3	6,626	
8 September 1998	Bury	A	1–2	4,310	McLoughlin (pen)
12 September 1998	Swindon Town	H	5–2	10,105	Aloisi (2), Igoe (2), Claridge
19 September 1998	Port Vale	A	2–0	5,992	Aloisi, Durnin
26 September 1998	Sunderland	H	1–1	17,022	Igoe
29 September 1998	Birmingham City	H	0–1	11,843	
3 October 1998	Sheffield United	A	1–2	15,386	Aloisi
10 October 1998	Bristol City	A	2–2	13,056	Igoe, Claridge
17 October 1998	Wolverhampton Wanderers	H	1–0	13,681	McLoughlin (pen)
20 October 1998	Bradford City	H	2–4	10,062	Aloisi (2)
24 October 1998	Barnsley	A	1–2	15,152	Durnin
7 November 1998	Crystal Palace	A	1–4	20,188	Aloisi
10 November 1998	Norwich City	H	1–2	9,335	Aloisi
14 November 1998	Grimsby Town	A	1–1	6,236	Aloisi
21 November 1998	West Bromwich Albion	H	2–1	11,144	Nightingale (2)
28 November 1998	Stockport County	A	0–2	7,504	
5 December 1998	Crewe Alexandra	H	2–0	19,284	McLoughlin, Claridge
13 December 1998	Grimsby Town	H	0–1	8,180	
19 December 1998	Bolton Wanderers	A	1–3	15,981	Igoe
26 December 1998	Ipswich Town	A	0–3	21,805	
28 December 1998	Oxford United	H	2–2	12,604	Claridge (2, 1 pen)
9 January 1999	Watford	A	0–0	12,057	
16 January 1999	Huddersfield Town	H	1–0	10,334	Claridge
30 January 1999	Queens Park Rangers	A	1–1	12,270	Nightingale
6 February 1999	Tranmere Rovers	H	1–1	10,597	Whittingham
13 February 1999	Bury	H	2–1	9,062	Robinson, Whittingham
20 February 1999	Swindon Town	A	3–3	10,230	Claridge (2), Péron
27 February 1999	Port Vale	H	4–0	12,838	McLoughlin (pen), Whittingham (3)
2 March 1999	Sunderland	A	0–2	37,656	
6 March 1999	Birmingham City	A	1–4	20,617	Whittingham
9 March 1999	Sheffield United	H	1–0	10,287	Awford
13 March 1999	Crystal Palace	H	1–1	15,120	Whittingham
20 March 1999	Norwich City	A	0–0	16,662	
28 March 1999	Barnsley	H	1–3	13,337	Durnin
3 April 1999	Wolverhampton Wanderers	A	0–2	23,262	
5 April 1999	Bristol City	H	0–1	13,026	
10 April 1999	Bradford City	A	1–2	13,552	Durnin
17 April 1999	West Bromwich Albion	A	2–2	12,750	Durnin (2)
24 April 1999	Stockport County	H	3–1	11,212	Claridge, Simpson, Durnin
1 May 1999	Crewe Alexandra	A	1–3	5,759	McLoughlin
9 May 1999	Bolton Wanderers	H	0–2	16,015	

=== FA Cup ===
Round	Date	Opponent	Venue	Result	Attendance	Goalscorers
R3	2 January 1999	Nottingham Forest	A	1–0	10,092	Claridge
R4	23 January 1999	Leeds United	H	1–5	18,864	Nightingale

=== League Cup ===
Round	Date	Opponent	Venue	Result	Attendance	Goalscorers
R1 1st Leg	11 August 1998	Plymouth Argyle	A	3–1	4,380	McLoughlin (pen), Vlachos, Aloisi
R1 2nd Leg	18 August 1998	Plymouth Argyle	H	3–2 (won 6–3 on agg)	5,479	Hillier, McLoughlin (pen), Aloisi
R2 1st Leg	15 September 1998	Wimbledon	H	2–1	7,010	Aloisi, McLoughlin
R2 2nd Leg	22 September 1998	Wimbledon	A	1–4 (lost 3–5 on agg)	3,756	Whitbread

== Squad ==
Squad at end of season

Note: Flags indicate national team as defined under FIFA eligibility rules; some limited exceptions apply. Players may hold more than one non-FIFA nationality.

No.	Pos.	Nation	Player
—	GK	ENG	Aaron Flahavan
—	GK	ENG	Alan Knight
—	GK	ENG	Chris Tardif
—	GK	AUS	Andy Petterson
—	DF	ENG	Andy Awford
—	DF	ENG	Russell Perrett
—	DF	ENG	Robbie Pethick
—	DF	ENG	Lee Russell
—	DF	ENG	Adrian Whitbread
—	DF	DEN	Thomas Thøgersen
—	DF	GRE	Michalis Vlachos
—	MF	ENG	David Hillier
—	MF	ENG	Sammy Igoe
—	MF	ENG	Martin Phillips
—	MF	ENG	David Robson

No.	Pos.	Nation	Player
—	MF	ENG	Steve Soley
—	MF	NIR	Dave Waterman
—	MF	IRL	Alan McLoughlin
—	MF	FRA	Jeff Péron
—	MF	BRA	Stefani Miglioranzi
—	MF	JAM	Fitzroy Simpson
—	FW	ENG	Steve Claridge
—	FW	ENG	John Durnin
—	FW	ENG	Luke Nightingale
—	FW	ENG	Robbie Simpson
—	DF	ENG	Andy Thomson
—	FW	ENG	Guy Whittingham
—	FW	NOR	Svein Are Andreassen
—	FW	GRE	Nikos Kyzeridis
—	FW	AUS	John Aloisi
