= 1997–98 Portsmouth F.C. season =

Portsmouth
1997–98 season
- Chairman: Terry Venables
- Manager: Terry Fenwick
- Stadium: Fratton Park
- First Division: 20th
- Highest home attendance: 17,003 vs. Middlesbrough (14 March 1998)
- Lowest home attendance: 6,827 vs. Bradford City (21 October 1997)
- Average home league attendance: 11,915 (Fratton End reopened 31 October 1997)

The 1997–98 season was Portsmouth's 99th in existence. A new Fratton End stand was opened on 31 October 1997. After just missing out on the play-offs the previous season, Portsmouth saw themselves in a relegation battle this season.

== League table ==
Pos	Team	Pld	W	D	L	GF	GA	GD	Pts	Qualification or relegation
18	Swindon Town	46	14	10	22	42	73	−31	52	
19	Port Vale	46	13	10	23	56	66	−10	49	
20	Portsmouth	46	13	10	23	51	63	−12	49	
21	Queens Park Rangers	46	10	19	17	51	63	−12	49	
22	Manchester City (R)	46	12	12	22	56	57	−1	48	Relegation to the Second Division

Source: Statto.com
Rules for classification: 1) Points; 2) Goals scored; 3) Goal difference
(R) Relegated

Venue	Played	Won	Drawn	Lost	For	Against
Home	23	8	6	9	28	30
Away	23	5	4	14	23	33
Total	46	13	10	23	51	63

== First squad ==
Squad at end of season

Note: Flags indicate national team as defined under FIFA eligibility rules; some limited exceptions apply. Players may hold more than one non-FIFA nationality.

No.	Pos.	Nation	Player
—	GK	(England) ENG	Aaron Flahavan
—	GK	(England) ENG	Alan Knight
—	DF	(England) ENG	Andy Awford
—	DF	(England) ENG	Andy Cook
—	DF	(England) ENG	Russell Perrett
—	DF	(England) ENG	Robbie Pethick
—	DF	(England) ENG	Matthew Robinson
—	DF	(England) ENG	Lee Russell
—	DF	(England) ENG	Andy Thomson
—	DF	(England) ENG	Adrian Whitbread
—	DF	(Wales) WAL	Aaron Cook
—	DF	(Greece) GRE	Michalis Vlachos
—	MF	(England) ENG	Martin Allen
—	MF	(England) ENG	Jimmy Carter
—	MF	(England) ENG	David Hillier

No.	Pos.	Nation	Player
—	MF	(England) ENG	Sammy Igoe
—	MF	(Northern Ireland) NIR	Dave Waterman
—	MF	(Republic of Ireland) IRL	Alan McLoughlin
—	MF	(Republic of Ireland) IRL	Andy Turner
—	MF	(Jamaica) JAM	Fitzroy Simpson
—	MF	(Australia) AUS	Robert Enes
—	MF	(Australia) AUS	Craig Foster
—	FW	(England) ENG	Steve Claridge
—	FW	(England) ENG	John Durnin
—	FW	(Sweden) SWE	Mathias Svensson
—	FW	(Jamaica) JAM	Paul Hall
—	FW	(Australia) AUS	John Aloisi
—	FW	(Australia) AUS	Paul Harries
—	FW	(Australia) AUS	Hamilton Thorp
—			Robbie Simpson

== Transfers ==
=== In ===
- (Australia) Hamilton Thorp - (Australia) West Adelaide, £75,000, 1 August
- (England) Matthew Robinson - (England) Southampton, £50,000, February
- (Australia) Craig Foster - (Australia) Marconi Stallions
- (Australia) Robert Enes - (Australia) Sydney United
- (Australia) Paul Harries - (Australia) Wollongong Wolves
