= 2000–01 Portsmouth F.C. season =

Portsmouth
2000–01 season
- Chairman: Milan Mandaric
- Manager: Tony Pulis (until 12 October); Steve Claridge (12 October – 25 February); Graham Rix (from 25 February)
- Stadium: Fratton Park
- Football League First Division: 20th
- FA Cup: Third round
- League Cup: Second round
- Top goalscorer: League: Claridge (11); All: Claridge/Bradbury (11)
- Highest home attendance: 19,013 vs. Crystal Palace (2 May 2001)
- Lowest home attendance: 9,235 vs. Tranmere Rovers (12 September 2000)
- Average home league attendance: 14,124

During the 2000–01 English football season, Portsmouth F.C. competed in the Football League First Division.

== Season summary ==
In October, Tony Pulis was put on gardening leave (and sacked not long afterwards) due to a poor relationship with Mandaric. Veteran player Steve Claridge stepped up to the manager's seat, and some initial success saw talk of promotion to the Premier League, only for a horrific run of defeats to set in after the new year, resulting in Claridge being dismissed as manager (but retained as a player) and being replaced in March 2001 by Chelsea assistant manager Graham Rix. Rix did not prove an entirely popular appointment, as he had been jailed for a sexual offence two years previously, and the club only survived on the last day of the season when they won their final game and relegated Huddersfield Town at their expense.

== Final league table ==
Pos	Team	Pld	W	D	L	GF	GA	GD	Pts	Qualification or relegation
18	Grimsby Town	46	14	10	22	43	62	−19	52	
19	Stockport County	46	11	18	17	58	65	−7	51	
20	Portsmouth	46	10	19	17	47	59	−12	49	
21	Crystal Palace	46	12	13	21	57	70	−13	49	
22	Huddersfield Town (R)	46	11	15	20	48	57	−9	48	Relegation to the Second Division

Rules for classification: 1) Points; 2) Goal difference; 3) Goals scored
(R) Relegated

== Results ==
Portsmouth's score comes first

=== Legend ===
Win	Draw	Loss

=== Football League First Division ===
Date	Opponent	Venue	Result	Attendance	Scorers
12 August 2000	Sheffield United	A	0–2	15,816	
19 August 2000	Grimsby Town	H	1–1	12,511	Bradbury
25 August 2000	Gillingham	A	1–1	8,741	Moore
28 August 2000	Wolverhampton Wanderers	H	3–1	14,124	Claridge (3, 1 pen)
2 September 2000	Preston North End	A	0–1	13,343	
9 September 2000	Watford	H	1–3	14,012	Quashie
12 September 2000	Tranmere Rovers	H	2–0	9,235	Mills, Bradbury
16 September 2000	Bolton Wanderers	A	0–2	14,113	
23 September 2000	West Bromwich Albion	H	0–1	11,937	
30 September 2000	Burnley	A	1–1	15,494	Claridge
8 October 2000	Stockport County	A	1–1	6,212	Mills
14 October 2000	Sheffield Wednesday	H	2–1	16,040	Thøgersen, Claridge
17 October 2000	Crewe Alexandra	H	2–1	14,621	Thøgersen, Claridge (pen)
21 October 2000	Crystal Palace	A	3–2	15,693	Claridge, Thøgersen, Panopoulos
24 October 2000	Norwich City	A	0–0	18,772	
28 October 2000	Birmingham City	H	1–1	15,218	Bradbury
4 November 2000	Queens Park Rangers	A	1–1	12,038	Bradbury
11 November 2000	Blackburn Rovers	H	2–2	14,141	Quashie, Panopoulos
18 November 2000	Fulham	A	1–3	19,005	Claridge
25 November 2000	Barnsley	A	0–1	12,853	
2 December 2000	Norwich City	H	2–0	13,409	Panopoulos, Quashie
9 December 2000	Nottingham Forest	A	0–2	19,284	
16 December 2000	Huddersfield Town	H	1–1	12,041	Claridge
23 December 2000	Sheffield United	H	0–0	13,606	
26 December 2000	Wimbledon	A	1–1	10,518	Claridge
1 January 2001	Gillingham	H	0–0	14,526	
13 January 2001	Wolverhampton Wanderers	A	1–1	20,869	Lescott (own goal)
20 January 2001	Wimbledon	H	2–1	12,488	Bradbury (pen), Quashie
27 January 2001	Grimsby Town	A	1–2	4,128	Bradbury
3 February 2001	Preston North End	H	0–1	13,331	
10 February 2001	Watford	A	2–2	16,051	Quashie, Claridge
17 February 2001	Bolton Wanderers	H	1–2	11,377	Panopoulos
24 February 2001	West Bromwich Albion	A	0–2	17,645	
3 March 2001	Burnley	H	2–0	12,941	Nightingale, Panopoulos (pen)
7 March 2001	Sheffield Wednesday	A	0–0	20,503	
10 March 2001	Stockport County	H	2–1	12,202	Bradbury, Lovell
14 March 2001	Tranmere Rovers	A	1–1	9,872	Harper
17 March 2001	Crewe Alexandra	A	0–1	5,182	
31 March 2001	Huddersfield Town	A	1–4	13,199	Mills
7 April 2001	Nottingham Forest	H	0–2	13,018	
14 April 2001	Queens Park Rangers	H	1–1	13,426	Bradbury
16 April 2001	Birmingham City	A	0–0	23,304	
21 April 2001	Fulham	H	1–1	17,651	Bradbury
29 April 2001	Blackburn Rovers	A	1–3	24,257	Panopoulos
2 May 2001	Crystal Palace	H	2–4	19,013	Mills, Tiler
6 May 2001	Barnsley	H	3–0	13,064	Bradbury, O'Neil, Harper

=== FA Cup ===
Round	Date	Opponent	Venue	Result	Attendance	Goalscorers
R3	6 January 2001	Tranmere Rovers	H	1–2	11,058	Bradbury

=== League Cup ===
Round	Date	Opponent	Venue	Result	Attendance	Goalscorers
R1 1st Leg	22 August 2000	Cambridge United	A	0–0	2,904	
R1 2nd Leg	5 September 2000	Cambridge United	H	1–0	5,570	Mills
R2 1st Leg	19 September 2000	Blackburn Rovers	A	0–4	10,360	
R2 2nd Leg	26 September 2000	Blackburn Rovers	H	1–1 (lost 1–5 on agg)	2,731	Nightingale

== Squad ==
Note: Flags indicate national team as defined under FIFA eligibility rules; some limited exceptions apply. Players may hold more than one non-FIFA nationality.

No.	Pos.	Nation	Player
1	GK	AUS	Andy Petterson
2	DF	ENG	Linvoy Primus
3	DF	ENG	Justin Edinburgh
4	MF	ENG	Shaun Derry
6	DF	JAM	Darren Moore
7	MF	SCO	Kevin Harper
8	MF	SVN	Mladen Rudonja
9	FW	ENG	Steve Claridge
10	FW	ENG	Lee Bradbury
11	MF	WAL	Ceri Hughes
12	MF	SCO	Nigel Quashie
13	GK	ENG	Aaron Flahavan
14	MF	ENG	Tom Curtis
15	DF	ENG	Jamie Vincent
16	DF	DEN	Thomas Thøgersen
17	MF	ENG	Lee Sharpe (on loan from Bradford City)
18	DF	NIR	Dave Waterman
19	FW	ENG	Luke Nightingale

No.	Pos.	Nation	Player
20	FW	ENG	Rory Allen
21	MF	ENG	Gary O'Neil
22	FW	ENG	Lee Mills
23	FW	ENG	Rowan Vine
24	DF	ENG	Scott Hiley
25	DF	ENG	Jason Crowe
26	GK	ENG	Chris Tardif
27	MF	SCO	Garry Brady
28	MF	ENG	Rob Wolleaston (on loan from Chelsea)
29	DF	ENG	Tom White
30	MF	BRA	Stefani Miglioranzi
31	FW	ENG	Steve Lovell
32	MF	GRE	Michael Panopoulos
35	DF	ENG	Lewis Buxton
36	DF	ENG	Carl Tiler
37	DF	ENG	Shaun Cooper
38	MF	ENG	Carl Pettefer
44	GK	ENG	Alan Knight

=== Left club during season ===
Note: Flags indicate national team as defined under FIFA eligibility rules; some limited exceptions apply. Players may hold more than one non-FIFA nationality.

No.	Pos.	Nation	Player
23	DF	FRA	Bernard Lambourde (on loan from Chelsea)
26	DF	ENG	Jason Cundy (Retired)
15	FW	ENG	Andy Awford (Retired)
25	MF	FRA	Marc Keller (on loan from West Ham United)
27	DF	ENG	David Birmingham (to Bournemouth)
39	MF	WAL	Adam Holbrook (Released)

No.	Pos.	Nation	Player
1	GK	ENG	Russell Hoult (to West Bromwich Albion)
5	DF	ENG	Adrian Whitbread (to Reading)
29	FW	ENG	Guy Whittingham (to Wycombe Wanderers)
33	MF	ENG	Joe McNab (Released)
34	MF	ENG	Neil McNab (Released)
