= 1999–2000 Portsmouth F.C. season =

Portsmouth F.C.
1999–2000 season
- Chairman: Milan Mandarić
- Manager: Alan Ball (until 9 December); Bob McNab (caretaker); Tony Pulis (from January)
- Stadium: Fratton Park
- First Division: 18th
- FA Cup: Third round
- Worthington Cup: Second round
- Top goalscorer: League: Steve Claridge (14); All: Steve Claridge (14)
- Highest home attendance: 19,015 vs. Manchester City (24 April 2000)
- Lowest home attendance: 9,042 vs. Walsall (19 October 1999)
- Average home league attendance: 14,028

During the 1999–2000 English football season, Portsmouth F.C. competed in the Football League First Division.

== Season summary ==
Manager Alan Ball's contract was terminated on 9 December with Portsmouth in the relegation zone. He was replaced by Bristol City manager Tony Pulis, who steered the club to survival in the First Division.

The end of the season saw the retirement of club goalkeeping legend Alan Knight, who made 801 career appearances over 22 years, all spent at Fratton Park. His final appearance came in a First Division match against Norwich City at Carrow Road in January.

== Kit ==
Portsmouth ended their kit manufacturing deal with Admiral after two years, to manufacture their own kits under the brand name "Pompey Sport".

== Final league table ==
Pos	Team	Pld	W	D	L	GF	GA	GD	Pts
16	Sheffield United	46	13	15	18	59	71	−12	54
17	Stockport County	46	13	15	18	55	67	−12	54
18	Portsmouth	46	13	12	21	55	66	−11	51
19	Crewe Alexandra	46	14	9	23	46	67	−21	51
20	Grimsby Town	46	13	12	21	41	67	−26	51

Rules for classification: 1) Points; 2) Goal difference; 3) Goals scored

== Results ==
Portsmouth's score comes first

=== Legend ===
Win	Draw	Loss

=== Football League First Division ===
Date	Opponent	Venue	Result	Attendance	Scorers
7 August 1999	Sheffield United	H	2–0	17,667	Miglioranzi, Whittingham
14 August 1999	Wolverhampton Wanderers	A	1–1	21,024	Allen
21 August 1999	Stockport County	H	2–0	15,002	Miglioranzi, Allen
28 August 1999	Barnsley	A	0–6	13,792	
30 August 1999	Huddersfield Town	H	0–0	13,105	
11 September 1999	Ipswich Town	H	1–1	16,304	Whittingham
18 September 1999	Tranmere Rovers	A	4–2	5,870	Péron (2), Whittingham, Vlachos
25 September 1999	Grimsby Town	H	1–2	12,073	McLoughlin (pen)
2 October 1999	Crystal Palace	A	0–4	15,221	
16 October 1999	Charlton Athletic	H	0–2	14,812	
19 October 1999	Walsall	H	5–1	9,042	Thøgersen (2), Bradbury, McLoughlin (2 pens)
23 October 1999	Queens Park Rangers	A	0–0	13,303	
26 October 1999	Grimsby Town	A	0–1	5,912	
30 October 1999	Crystal Palace	H	3–1	13,018	Claridge (2), Bradbury
3 November 1999	Manchester City	A	2–4	31,660	Bradbury, Thøgersen
6 November 1999	Birmingham City	H	2–2	12,756	McLoughlin (2 pens)
9 November 1999	Fulham	A	0–1	13,229	
14 November 1999	West Bromwich Albion	A	2–3	11,483	Whittingham, Awford
20 November 1999	Crewe Alexandra	H	0–2	11,550	
24 November 1999	Nottingham Forest	A	0–2	13,841	
27 November 1999	Bolton Wanderers	H	0–0	10,431	
4 December 1999	Sheffield United	A	0–1	10,834	
18 December 1999	Port Vale	H	0–0	11,869	
26 December 1999	Swindon Town	A	1–1	10,279	Claridge
28 December 1999	Blackburn Rovers	H	1–2	15,208	Claridge
3 January 2000	Norwich City	A	1–2	16,637	Bradbury
15 January 2000	Wolverhampton Wanderers	H	2–3	13,255	Igoe, Claridge
22 January 2000	Stockport County	A	1–1	8,008	Hughes
29 January 2000	Barnsley	H	3–0	12,201	Claridge (3)
5 February 2000	Huddersfield Town	A	1–0	12,753	Claridge
12 February 2000	Fulham	H	0–1	17,337	
22 February 2000	Bolton Wanderers	A	0–3	12,672	
1 March 2000	Tranmere Rovers	H	1–2	10,759	Claridge (pen)
4 March 2000	Ipswich Town	A	1–0	20,305	Claridge
7 March 2000	Birmingham City	A	0–1	19,573	
11 March 2000	Nottingham Forest	H	2–1	14,336	Thøgersen, Claridge
18 March 2000	Crewe Alexandra	A	3–1	6,188	Claridge, Thøgersen, Harper
21 March 2000	West Bromwich Albion	H	2–0	14,760	Claridge (pen), Derry
25 March 2000	Swindon Town	H	4–1	15,305	Whitbread, Bradbury (3)
1 April 2000	Port Vale	A	0–2	5,426	
8 April 2000	Norwich City	H	2–1	14,003	Harper, Moore
15 April 2000	Blackburn Rovers	A	1–1	19,263	Hughes
21 April 2000	Charlton Athletic	A	1–1	20,043	Bradbury
24 April 2000	Manchester City	H	2–2	19,015	Bradbury (2, 1 pen)
29 April 2000	Walsall	A	0–1	8,151	
7 May 2000	Queens Park Rangers	H	1–3	16,301	Allen

=== FA Cup ===
Round	Date	Opponent	Venue	Result	Attendance	Goalscorers
R3	11 December 1999	Sunderland	A	0–1	26,535	

=== League Cup ===
Round	Date	Opponent	Venue	Result	Attendance	Goalscorers
R1 1st Leg	17 August 1999	Torquay United	A	0–0	3,209	
R1 2nd Leg	24 August 1999	Torquay United	H	3–0	8,741	Nightingale (2), Lovell
R2 1st Leg	14 September 1999	Blackburn Rovers	H	0–3	8,542	
R2 2nd Leg	22 September 1999	Blackburn Rovers	A	1–3	7,512	McLoughlin

== First-team squad ==
Note: Flags indicate national team as defined under FIFA eligibility rules; some limited exceptions apply. Players may hold more than one non-FIFA nationality.

No.	Pos.	Nation	Player
1	GK	(Australia) AUS	Andy Petterson
2	DF	(England) ENG	Jason Crowe
3	DF	(England) ENG	Anthony Fenton
4	MF	(Scotland) SCO	Kevin Harper
5	DF	(England) ENG	Adrian Whitbread
6	DF	(England) ENG	Andy Awford
7	DF	(England) ENG	Andy Myers (on loan from Bradford City)
8	MF	(Brazil) BRA	Stefani Miglioranzi
9	FW	(England) ENG	Steve Claridge
10	DF	(England) ENG	Justin Edinburgh
11	MF	(Wales) WAL	Ceri Hughes
12	FW	(England) ENG	Lee Bradbury
13	GK	(England) ENG	Aaron Flahavan
14	DF	(England) ENG	Scott Hiley
15	DF	(England) ENG	Jason Cundy
16	DF	(Denmark) DEN	Thomas Thøgersen

No.	Pos.	Nation	Player
17	MF	(England) ENG	Martin Phillips
18	DF	(Northern Ireland) NIR	Dave Waterman
19	FW	(England) ENG	Luke Nightingale
20	MF	(England) ENG	Shaun Derry
21	GK	(England) ENG	Alan Knight
22	GK	(England) ENG	Chris Tardif
23	FW	(England) ENG	Guy Whittingham
24	FW	(England) ENG	Rory Allen
25	FW	(England) ENG	Steve Lovell
26	DF	(France) FRA	Noé Pamarot (on loan from Nice)
27	MF	(Greece) GRE	Michael Panopoulos
28	DF	(England) ENG	David Birmingham
29	MF	(England) ENG	Adam Holbrook
30	GK	(England) ENG	Russell Hoult
31	DF	(England) ENG	Darren Moore
33	MF	(England) ENG	Gary O'Neil

=== Left club during season ===
Note: Flags indicate national team as defined under FIFA eligibility rules; some limited exceptions apply. Players may hold more than one non-FIFA nationality.

No.	Pos.	Nation	Player
3	DF	(England) ENG	Matthew Robinson (to Reading)
4	MF	(Republic of Ireland) IRL	Alan McLoughlin (to Wigan Athletic)
4	MF	(England) ENG	Paulo Vernazza (on loan from Arsenal)
7	MF	(England) ENG	Sammy Igoe (to Reading)
10	DF	(Greece) GRE	Michalis Vlachos (to Walsall)
11	MF	(France) FRA	Jeff Peron (to Wigan Athletic)
12	MF	(Saint Kitts and Nevis) SKN	Adam Newton (on loan from West Ham United)

No.	Pos.	Nation	Player
14	MF	(Jamaica) JAM	Fitzroy Simpson (to Hearts)
20	MF	(England) ENG	John Durnin (to Carlisle United)
21	MF	(England) ENG	Steve Soley (to Carlisle United)
30	DF	(Norway) NOR	Tommy Berntsen (on loan from Lillestrøm)
32	MF	(England) ENG	Michael Brown (on loan from Manchester City)
33	FW	(England) ENG	Lee Makel (on loan from Hearts)
