= 1991–92 Portsmouth F.C. season =

Portsmouth F.C.
1991–92 season
- Manager: Jim Smith
- Stadium: Fratton Park, Portsmouth
- Division Two: 9th
- FA Cup: Semi-final
- League Cup: Third round
- Full Members Cup: First round
- Top goalscorer: League: All: Guy Whittingham 13 goals
- Highest home attendance: 25,402
- Lowest home attendance: 4,682

The 1991–92 season marked Portsmouth F.C.'s third consecutive season in the Football League Second Division. Under the management of Jim Smith, who had been appointed in June 1991, the team finished ninth in the league, an improvement of eight places from the previous season, but missed out on the promotion play-offs by five points.

A notable highlight of the season was Portsmouth's run to the FA Cup semi-finals. They faced Liverpool, losing in a penalty shootout after twice drawing with the eventual winners.

== Second Division ==
Opposing Team	For	Against	Date	Venue
Blackburn Rovers	1	1	17 August 1991	Ewood Park
Port Vale	1	0	24 August 1991	Fratton Park
Middlesbrough	0	1	31 August 1991	Ayresome Park
Sunderland	1	0	3 September 1991	Fratton Park
Brighton and Hove Albion	0	0	7 September 1991	Fratton Park
Charlton Athletic	0	3	14 September 1991	The Valley
Grimsby Town	1	1	17 September 1991	Blundell Park
Cambridge United	3	0	21 September 1991	Fratton Park
Bristol City	2	0	28 September 1991	Ashton Gate
Newcastle United	3	1	5 October 1991	Fratton Park
Barnsley	0	2	12 October 1991	Oakwell, Barnsley
Derby County	0	2	19 October 1991	Baseball Ground
Ipswich Town	1	1	26 October 1991	Fratton Park
Millwall	1	1	2 November 1991	The Den, London
Leicester City	1	0	5 November 1991	Fratton Park
Oxford United	2	1	9 November 1991	Fratton Park
Swindon Town	3	2	16 November 1991	County Ground
Watford	1	2	23 November 1991	Vicarage Road
Wolverhampton Wanderers	1	0	30 November 1991	Fratton Park
Southend United	1	1	14 December 1991	Fratton Park
Sunderland	0	1	21 December 1991	Roker Park
Bristol Rovers	2	0	26 December 1991	Fratton Park
Middlesbrough	4	0	28 December 1991	Fratton Park
Plymouth Argyle	2	3	1 January 1992	Home Park
Port Vale	2	0	11 January 1992	Vale Park
Blackburn Rovers	2	2	18 January 1992	Fratton Park
Bristol Rovers	0	1	29 January 1992	Twerton Park
Derby County	0	1	1 February 1992	Fratton Park
Plymouth Argyle	4	1	4 February 1992	Fratton Park
Ipswich Town	2	5	8 February 1992	Portman Road
Wolverhampton Wanderers	0	0	22 February 1992	Molineux
Tranmere Rovers	2	0	29 February 1992	Fratton Park
Leicester City	2	2	11 March 1992	Filbert Street
Millwall	6	1	14 March 1992	Fratton Park
Southend United	3	2	17 March 1992	Roots Hall
Oxford United	1	2	21 March 1992	Manor Ground
Swindon Town	1	1	28 March 1992	Fratton Park
Charlton Athletic	1	2	31 March 1992	Fratton Park
Tranmere Rovers	0	2	7 April 1992	Prenton Park
Grimsby Town	2	0	11 April 1992	Fratton Park
Cambridge United	2	2	17 April 1992	Abbey Stadium
Bristol City	1	0	20 April 1992	Fratton Park
Watford	0	0	22 April 1992	Fratton Park
Newcastle United	0	1	25 April 1992	St James' Park
Brighton and Hove Albion	1	2	29 April 1992	Goldstone Ground
Barnsley	2	0	2 May 1992	Fratton Park

Pos	Team	Pld	W	D	L	GF	GA	GD	Pts	Qualification or relegation
7	Charlton Athletic	46	20	11	15	54	48	+6	71	Qualification for the First Division (Note: From the 1992–93 season, the first tier became the Premier League, the second tier - then known as the Second Division - was renamed to the First Division, and the third tier - then known as the Third Division - was renamed to the Second Division.)
8	Swindon Town	46	18	15	13	69	55	+14	69	Qualification for the First Division
9	Portsmouth	46	19	12	15	65	51	+14	69	Qualification for the First Division
10	Watford	46	18	11	17	51	48	+3	65	Qualification for the First Division
11	Wolverhampton Wanderers	46	18	10	18	61	54	+7	64	Qualification for the First Division

Rules for classification: 1) Points; 2) Goal difference; 3) Goals scored

== FA Cup ==
Opposing Team	For	Against	Date	Venue	Round
Exeter City	2	1	4 January 1992	St James Park	3rd Round
Leyton Orient	2	0	25 January 1992	Fratton Park	4th Round
Middlesbrough	1	1	15 February 1992	Fratton Park	5th Round
Middlesbrough	4	2	26 February 1992	Ayresome Park	5th Round Replay
Nottingham Forest	1	0	26 February 1992	Fratton Park	Quarter Final
Liverpool	1	1	5 April 1992	Highbury	Semi Final
Liverpool	0	0	13 April 1992	Villa Park	Semi Final Replay

=== Semi Final Line Up ===
1992-04-05

Portsmouth	1 – 1	Liverpool
Anderton 111'	(Report)	Whelan 116'

Highbury, London
Attendance: 41,869
Referee: M. Bodenham

PORTSMOUTH:
GK	1	(England) Alan Knight
RB	2	(England) Andy Awford
LB	3	(England) John Beresford
CM	4	(Republic of Ireland) Alan McLoughlin	Substituted off
CB	5	(Wales) Kit Symons
CB	6	(England) Chris Burns
CM	7	(England) Warren Neill
CM	8	(England) Martin Kuhl (c)
CF	9	(Northern Ireland) Colin Clarke
RW	10	(England) Mark Chamberlain	Substituted off
LW	11	(England) Darren Anderton
Substitutes:
FW		(England) Guy Whittingham	Substituted on
MF		(England) Warren Aspinall	Substituted on
Manager:
(England) Jim Smith

LIVERPOOL:
GK	1	(Zimbabwe) Bruce Grobbelaar
RB	2	(England) Rob Jones
LB	3	(England) David Burrows	(substituted off) 45'
CB	4	(Scotland) Steve Nicol
CM	5	(Republic of Ireland) Ronnie Whelan
CB	6	(England) Mark Wright (c)
AM	7	(England) Steve McManaman
RW	8	(Republic of Ireland) Ray Houghton	(substituted off) 88'
CF	9	(Wales) Ian Rush
LW	10	(England) John Barnes
CM	11	(England) Michael Thomas
Substitutes:
DF	12	(England) Barry Venison	(substituted on) 45'
MF	14	(England) Mike Marsh	(substituted on) 88'
Manager:
(Scotland) Graeme Souness

=== Semi Final Line Up Replay ===
1992-04-13

Portsmouth	0 – 0	Liverpool
	(Report)
Penalties
Kuhl (penalty missed); Symons (penalty scored); Neill (penalty missed); Beresford (penalty missed)	1 – 3	(penalty scored) Barnes; (penalty scored) Rush; (penalty scored) Saunders

Villa Park, Birmingham
Attendance: 40,077

PORTSMOUTH:
GK	1	(England) Alan Knight
RB	2	(England) Andy Awford
LB	3	(England) John Beresford
CM	4	(Republic of Ireland) Alan McLoughlin	Substituted off
CB	5	(Wales) Kit Symons
CB	6	(England) Chris Burns
CM	7	(England) Warren Neill
CM	8	(England) Martin Kuhl (c)
CF	9	(Northern Ireland) Colin Clarke	Substituted off
LW	10	(England) Ray Daniel
RW	11	(England) Darren Anderton
Substitutes:
FW		(England) Guy Whittingham	Substituted on
MF		(England) Steve Wigley	Substituted on
Manager:
(England) Jim Smith

LIVERPOOL:
GK	1	(Zimbabwe) Bruce Grobbelaar
RB	2	(England) Rob Jones	(substituted off) 117'
LB	3	(England) David Burrows
CB	4	(Scotland) Steve Nicol
CM	5	(Republic of Ireland) Ronnie Whelan	(substituted off) 70'
CB	6	(England) Mark Wright (c)
CF	7	(Wales) Dean Saunders
CM	8	(Denmark) Jan Mølby
CF	9	(Wales) Ian Rush
LW	10	(England) John Barnes
RW	11	(England) Michael Thomas
Substitutes:
MF	12	(England) Mark Walters	(substituted on) 117'
DF	14	(England) Barry Venison	(substituted on) 70'
Manager:
(Scotland) Graeme Souness

== League Cup ==
Opposing Team	For	Against	Date	Venue	Round
Gillingham	2	1	20 August 1991	Fratton Park	1st Round 1st Leg
Gillingham	4	3	27 August 1991	Priestfield Stadium	1st Round 2nd Leg
Oxford United	0	0	24 September 1991	Fratton Park	2nd Round 1st Leg
Oxford United	1	0	9 October 1991	Manor Ground	2nd Round 2nd Leg
Manchester United	1	3	30 October 1991	Old Trafford	3rd Round

== Full Members Cup ==
Opposing Team	For	Against	Date	Venue	Round
Plymouth Argyle	0	1	1 October 1991	Home Park	1st Round
