= 1994–95 Portsmouth F.C. season =

Portsmouth
1994–95 season
- Chairman: Jim Gregory
- Manager: Jim Smith (until 1 February); Terry Fenwick (from 1 February)
- Stadium: Fratton Park
- First Division: 18th
- FA Cup: Fourth round
- League Cup: Third round
- Top goalscorer: League: Creaney (18); All: Creaney (22)
- Average home league attendance: 8,269

During the 1994–95 English football season, Portsmouth F.C. competed in the Football League First Division.

== Season summary ==
The 1994–95 season was a disappointing one for Pompey and after a decline in form which left them struggling at the wrong end of Division One, Smith was sacked in February 1995 and was replaced by Terry Fenwick, who guided them to safety with 4 wins in their final 6 league games.

== Final league table ==
Pos	Team	Pld	W	D	L	GF	GA	GD	Pts
16	Luton Town	46	15	13	18	61	64	−3	58
17	Port Vale	46	15	13	18	58	64	−6	58
18	Portsmouth	46	15	13	18	53	63	−10	58
19	West Bromwich Albion	46	16	10	20	51	57	−6	58
20	Sunderland	46	12	18	16	41	45	−4	54

Rules for classification: 1) Points; 2) Goals scored; 3) Goal difference

== Results ==
Portsmouth's score comes first

=== Legend ===
Win	Draw	Loss

=== Football League First Division ===
Date	Opponent	Venue	Result	Attendance	Scorers
13 August 1994	Notts County	H	2–1	10,487	Powell, Symons
20 August 1994	Reading	A	0–0	9,106	
27 August 1994	Charlton Athletic	H	1–1	10,566	Symons
30 August 1994	Southend United	A	2–1	4,333	Creaney, Powell
10 September 1994	Port Vale	H	0–2	8,989	
14 September 1994	Tranmere Rovers	H	1–1	6,383	Hall
17 September 1994	Bolton Wanderers	A	1–1	11,284	Creaney
24 September 1994	Wolverhampton Wanderers	H	1–2	13,466	Creaney
28 September 1994	West Bromwich Albion	A	2–0	13,545	Pethick, Hall
1 October 1994	Grimsby Town	A	0–2	4,172	
8 October 1994	Oldham Athletic	A	2–3	7,683	Creaney, Hall
15 October 1994	Swindon Town	H	4–3	10,610	McLoughlin (2), Powell, Creaney (pen)
23 October 1994	Middlesbrough	H	0–0	7,281	
29 October 1994	Bristol City	A	1–1	7,238	Powell
2 November 1994	Millwall	A	2–2	7,108	Rees, McLoughlin (pen)
6 November 1994	Derby County	H	0–1	5,507	
19 November 1994	Luton Town	A	0–2	8,214	
26 November 1994	Sunderland	H	1–4	7,527	Powell
30 November 1994	Stoke City	H	0–1	5,772	
3 December 1994	Middlesbrough	A	0–4	17,185	
10 December 1994	Reading	H	1–1	8,578	Creaney
17 December 1994	Notts County	A	1–0	6,382	Wood
26 December 1994	Watford	A	0–2	9,953	
27 December 1994	Barnsley	H	3–0	6,751	Newhouse, Creaney (2)
31 December 1994	Sheffield United	A	1–3	13,467	Creaney
2 January 1995	Burnley	H	2–0	9,097	Preki, Creaney
14 January 1995	Bristol City	H	0–0	8,803	
22 January 1995	Derby County	A	0–3	9,704	
4 February 1995	Stoke City	A	2–0	12,372	Preki, Creaney
18 February 1995	Sunderland	A	2–2	12,372	McLoughlin, Doling
21 February 1995	Luton Town	H	3–2	7,363	McLoughlin, Preki, Creaney (pen)
25 February 1995	Grimsby Town	H	2–1	8,274	Creaney, Symons
5 March 1995	Wolverhampton Wanderers	A	0–1	23,284	
8 March 1995	West Bromwich Albion	H	1–2	7,160	Creaney
11 March 1995	Charlton Athletic	A	0–1	9,443	
15 March 1995	Millwall	H	3–2	6,032	Creaney (2), Hall
18 March 1995	Southend United	H	1–1	6,667	McLoughlin
21 March 1995	Port Vale	A	0–1	7,388	
25 March 1995	Bolton Wanderers	H	1–1	7,765	Creaney
1 April 1995	Tranmere Rovers	A	2–4	8,722	Preki, Irons (own goal)
8 April 1995	Sheffield United	H	1–0	8,216	Creaney
15 April 1995	Barnsley	A	0–1	6,825	
17 April 1995	Watford	H	2–1	8,396	Durnin (pen), Burton
22 April 1995	Burnley	A	2–1	10,666	Durnin (pen), Symons
29 April 1995	Swindon Town	A	2–0	9,220	Preki, Burton
7 May 1995	Oldham Athletic	H	1–1	11,002	Hall

=== FA Cup ===
Round	Date	Opponent	Venue	Result	Attendance	Goalscorers
R3	7 January 1995	Bolton Wanderers	H	3–1	9,721	Preki (2), Creaney
R4	28 January 1995	Leicester City	H	0–1	14,928	

=== League Cup ===
Round	Date	Opponent	Venue	Result	Attendance	Goalscorers
R1 First Leg	17 August 1994	Cambridge United	H	2–0	3,854	Stimson, Powell
R1 Second Leg	23 August 1994	Cambridge United	A	3–2 (won 5–2 on agg)	2,571	Powell (2), Creaney
R2 First Leg	20 September 1994	Everton	A	3–2	14,043	Creaney (2), Kristensen
R2 Second Leg	5 October 1994	Everton	H	1–1 (won 4–3 on agg)	13,605	Hall
R3	26 October 1994	Derby County	H	0–1	8,568	

== Squad ==
Note: Flags indicate national team as defined under FIFA eligibility rules; some limited exceptions apply. Players may hold more than one non-FIFA nationality.

No.	Pos.	Nation	Player
—	GK	(England) ENG	Aaron Flahavan
—	GK	(England) ENG	Jimmy Glass
—	GK	(England) ENG	Alan Knight
—	GK	(Estonia) EST	Mart Poom
—	DF	(England) ENG	Andy Awford
—	DF	(England) ENG	Mark Stimson
—	DF	(Denmark) DEN	Bjørn Kristensen
—	DF	(England) ENG	Guy Butters
—	DF	(England) ENG	Jon Gittens
—	DF	(England) ENG	David Lee (on loan from Chelsea)
—	DF	(Wales) WAL	Kit Symons
—	DF	(England) ENG	Ray Daniel
—	DF	(England) ENG	Tony Dobson
—	DF	(England) ENG	Robbie Pethick
—	DF	(England) ENG	Warren Neill

No.	Pos.	Nation	Player
—	DF	(England) ENG	Lee Russell
—	MF	(England) ENG	Sammy Igoe
—	MF	(England) ENG	Lloyd McGrath
—	MF	(Republic of Ireland) IRL	Alan McLoughlin
—	MF	(Jamaica) JAM	Darryl Powell
—	MF	(United States) USA	Preki
—	MF	(Wales) WAL	Jason Rees
—	MF	(England) ENG	Alex Totten
—	MF	(England) ENG	Stuart Doling
—	FW	(Jamaica) JAM	Paul Hall
—	FW	(England) ENG	John Durnin
—	FW	(Scotland) SCO	Gerry Creaney
—	FW	(Jamaica) JAM	Deon Burton
—	FW	(England) ENG	Paul Wood
—	FW	(England) ENG	Aidan Newhouse (on loan from Wimbledon)
