= Portsmouth Centenary Tournament =

- Founded: 1998
- Region: Europe
- Teams: 4
- Current champions: (France) Sochaux (1st title)
- Most championships: (France) Sochaux (1 title)

The Portsmouth Centenary Tournament was an invitational football tournament to celebrate the centenary of Portsmouth FC at Fratton Park, Portsmouth. The only edition took place between 1 and 2 August 1998. It was contested by four teams.

== Tournament ==
=== Bracket ===
Semi-finals
1 August – Portsmouth (Fratton Park)
(England) Portsmouth	2
(Italy) Genoa	2
1 August – Portsmouth (Fratton Park)
(England) Wimbledon	1
(France) Sochaux	1

Final
2 August – Portsmouth (Fratton Park)
(Italy) Genoa	1
(France) Sochaux	2
Third place
2 August – Portsmouth (Fratton Park)
(England) Portsmouth	1
(England) Wimbledon	3

Genoa beat Portsmouth 8–7 on penalties.
Sochaux beat Wimbledon 4–3 on penalties.

=== Results ===
1 August 1998 Semi Final	Portsmouth	2 – 2 (7–8 p)	Genoa	Fratton Park
	Durnin 2'; Aloisi 22'		Pasa 13'; Di Muri 74'

1 August 1998 Semi Final	Wimbledon	1 – 1 (3–4 p)	Sochaux	Fratton Park

2 August 1998 3rd/4th Place	Portsmouth	1 – 3	Wimbledon	Fratton Park
	Durnin 44'		Kennedy 44'; Ardley 49'; Euell 70'	Attendance: 1,950

2 August 1998 Final	Sochaux	2 – 1	Genoa	Fratton Park
	Bouger 9'; Klausz 75'		Flachez o.g. 48'	Attendance: 1,950
