= John Durnin =

English footballer (born 1965)

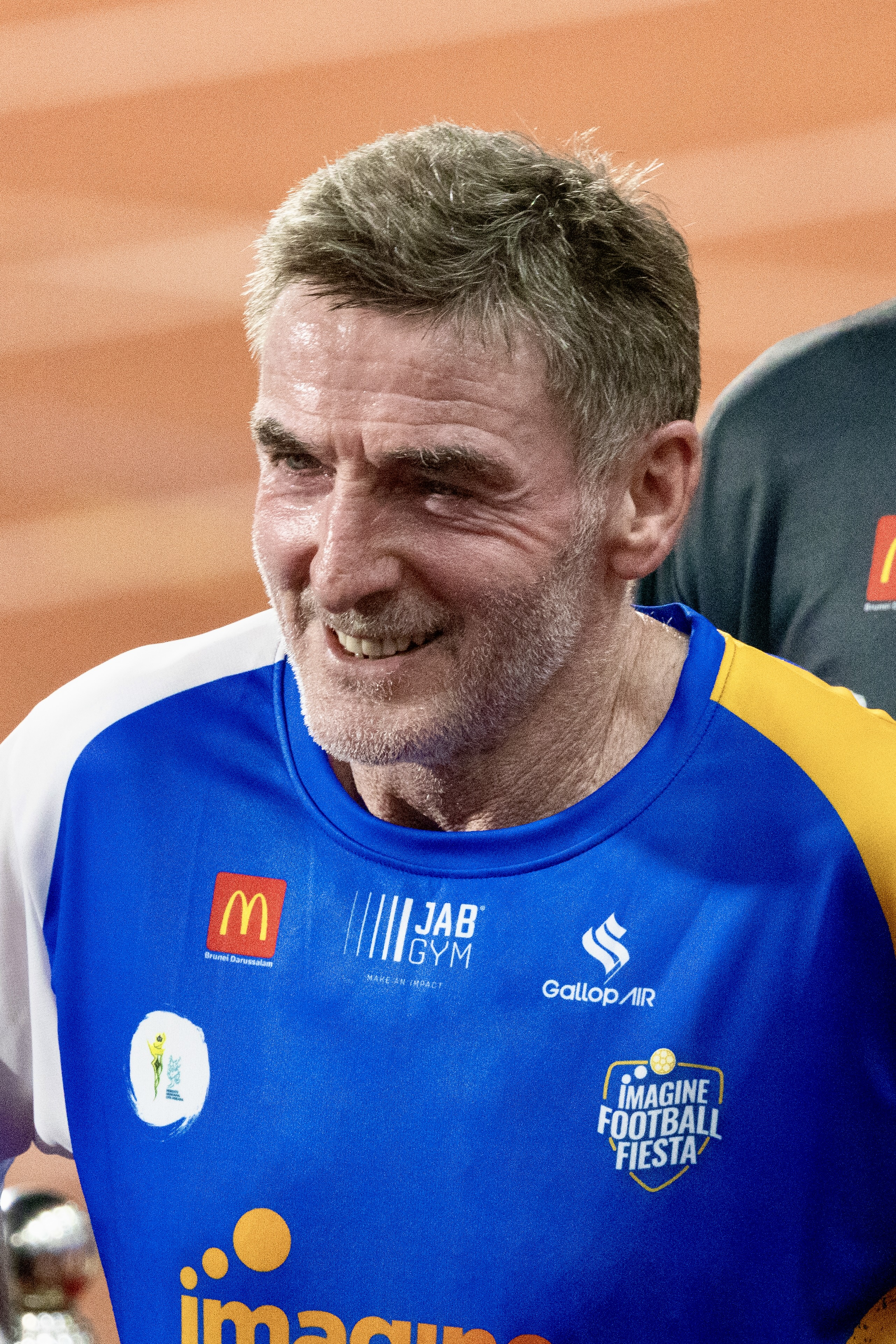
- Durnin in 2024

Personal information
- Full name: John Paul Durnin
- Date of birth: 18 August 1965 (age 61)
- Place of birth: Bootle, England
- Height: 5 ft 10 in (1.78 m)
- Positions: Midfielder; forward

Youth career
- 1985–1986: Waterloo Dock

Senior career*
Years	Team	Apps	(Gls)
1986–1989	Liverpool	0	(0)
1988	→ West Bromwich Albion (loan)	5	(2)
1989–1993	Oxford United	161	(44)
1993–1999	Portsmouth	181	(31)
1999	→ Blackpool (loan)	5	(1)
1999–2000	Carlisle United	22	(2)
2000–2001	Kidderminster Harriers	31	(9)
2001	Rhyl	10	(4)
2001–2003	Port Vale	47	(2)
2003–2004	Accrington Stanley	15	(4)
Total		477	(99)
- * Club domestic league appearances and goals

John Paul Durnin (born 18 August 1965) is an English former footballer who scored 100 goals in 475 league appearances over a career spanning close to two decades.

He began his career at Liverpool in 1986. He made just three minor cup appearances for the first team before he was allowed to join Oxford United for a £225,000 fee in February 1989, having previously gained experience on loan at West Bromwich Albion. He spent four years with Oxford, playing close to 200 games, before being sold to Portsmouth for £200,000 in 1993. In six years with "Pompey" he made around 200 appearances before he was loaned out to Blackpool, and then allowed to leave permanently for Carlisle United in 1999. In 2000, he signed with Kidderminster Harriers before he briefly entered the Welsh football circuit with Rhyl in 2001. Later that year, he returned to the Football League with Port Vale before he joined Conference side Accrington Stanley for twelve months in May 2003.

== Playing career ==
Durnin's career began with Liverpool in 1986, when he was signed from local non-League side Waterloo Dock for £500. Able to play in midfield or up front, he was a regular in the Liverpool Reserves. Still, he failed to break into the first team, making only two appearances, both in the League Cup. In October 1988 he was loaned out to West Bromwich Albion, as one of Brian Talbot's first signings at The Hawthorns. He scored twice in five Second Division appearances before returning to Anfield. He moved to Oxford United in February 1989, after manager Brian Horton paid a fee of £225,000. The "Yellows" finished 17th in the Second Division in 1988–89 and 1989–90, with Durnin finishing as the club's top scorer in the latter campaign with 15 goals. They rose to 10th in 1990–91, only to plummet to one place and two points above the relegation zone in 1991–92. They rose to 14th in 1992–93. Durnin spent four and a half years at the Manor Ground, amassing 47 goals in 180 league and cup appearances, becoming a cult hero amongst the fans, who affectionately gave him the nickname "Johnny Lager".

Durnin was snapped up by Portsmouth for £200,000 in July 1993, with the manager Jim Smith looking to play up him front alongside Paul Walsh. The club finished 17th in the First Division in 1993–94 and 18th in 1994–95. He hit three goals in 1995–96, as "Pompey" avoided the drop after finishing one place ahead of relegated Millwall on goal difference. He scored three times in 35 games in 1996–97, as Terry Fenwick led the club to 7th place, one place and three points behind Crystal Palace in the final play-off place. The Fratton Park faithful witnessed another relegation scrap in 1997–98, as "Pompey" finished two places and one point ahead of relegated Manchester City; Durnin scored ten goals in 35 appearances during the campaign. He scored seven goals in 30 appearances in 1998–99, as Alan Ball led the club to 19th, ahead of relegated Bury on goals scored. Durnin lost his first-team place at the start of the 1999–2000 campaign after he dislocated an elbow by crashing a golf cart into a fairway hollow. He was loaned out to Second Division Blackpool in November 1999, and scored twice in six games for Nigel Worthington's "Tangerines" with strikes against Wigan Athletic in the league and Hendon in the FA Cup. He joined Carlisle United on loan the following month, and signed a permanent deal at Brunton Park in February 2000. He played 23 times for the "Cumbrians" in 1999–2000 as the club finished second-from-bottom in the Third Division under Martin Wilkinson, avoiding relegation into the Conference only due to their superior goal difference to Chester City.

Durnin was without a club until he signed with Football League newcomers Kidderminster Harriers in October 2000, after being signed by former Liverpool teammate Jan Mølby. He hit nine goals in 32 games in 2000–01, before leaving Aggborough in the summer. He joined League of Wales side Rhyl as player-coach in July 2001. He returned to the Second Division in December 2001, linking up with his former manager Brian Horton at Port Vale. He stayed at Vale Park for 18 months, also helping out in a coaching capacity, before he left in May 2003. Despite being the wrong side of 36, he still managed to play 19 games in 2001–02 and 31 games in 2002–03, scoring once in each campaign. Now aged 38, he signed a deal with Conference side Accrington Stanley, and scored four goals in 15 games before he retired in 2004.

== Coaching career ==
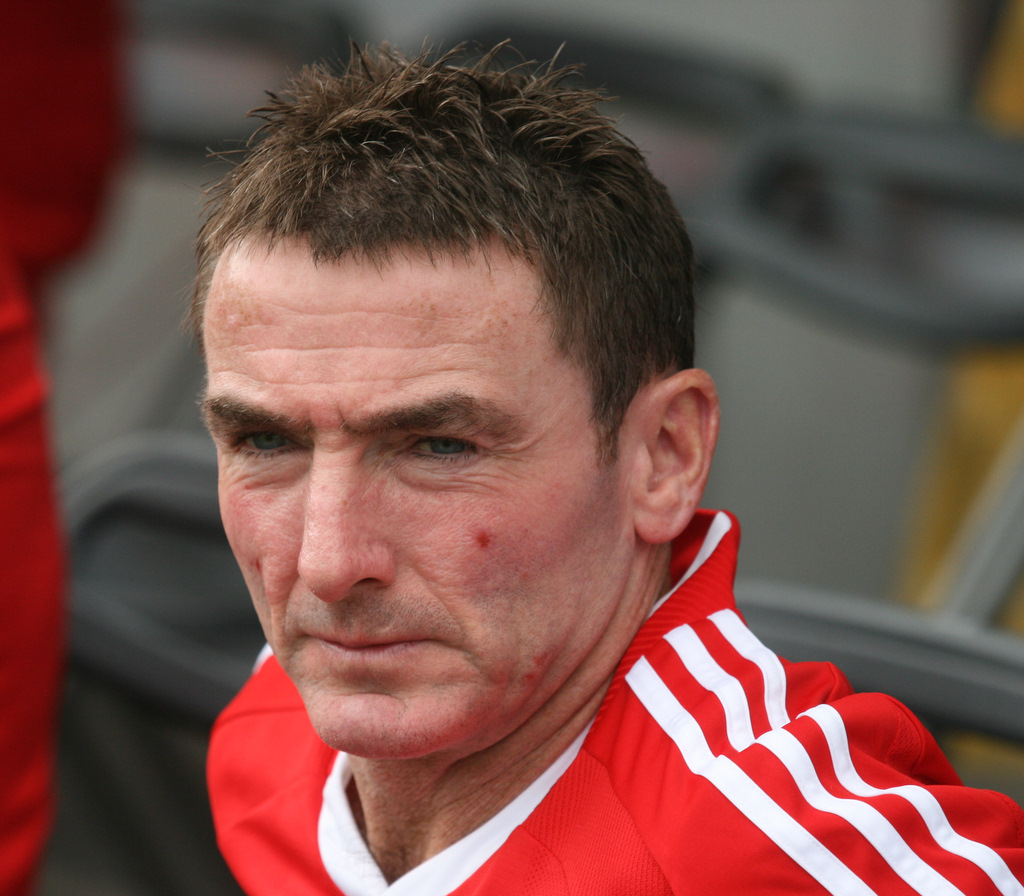
Durnin at a Masters game in 2008

In July 2006, he joined the coaching staff of Southport, but left in October. He returned to Southport as first-team coach on a non-contract basis in May 2017, before this arrangement was ended three months later.

== Personal life ==
After retiring, he became a regular for the Liverpool Masters team. In 2019 he was convicted of common assault, impersonating a police officer and a racially-aggravated common assault after two incidents in August 2018 – in mitigation, he claimed to have been 'emotionally unstable' after discovering his wife of three decades had cheated on him; he had another previous conviction for common assault after a road rage incident in 2015.

== Career statistics ==
Appearances and goals by club, season and competition
Club	Season	League			FA Cup		Other		Total	
Club	Season	Division	Apps	Goals	Apps	Goals	Apps	Goals	Apps	Goals
Liverpool	1986–87	First Division	0	0	0	0	1	0	1	0
Liverpool	1987–88	First Division	0	0	0	0	0	0	0	0
Liverpool	1988–89	First Division	0	0	0	0	2	0	2	0
Liverpool	Total		0	0	0	0	3	0	3	0
West Bromwich Albion (loan)	1988–89	Second Division	5	2	0	0	0	0	5	2
Oxford United	1988–89	Second Division	19	3	0	0	0	0	19	3
Oxford United	1989–90	Second Division	42	13	1	0	3	2	46	15
Oxford United	1990–91	Second Division	26	9	2	1	3	0	31	10
Oxford United	1991–92	Second Division	37	8	2	0	1	0	40	8
Oxford United	1992–93	Second Division	37	11	2	0	5	0	44	11
Oxford United	Total		161	44	7	1	12	2	180	47
Portsmouth	1993–94	First Division	28	6	2	0	13	3	43	9
Portsmouth	1994–95	First Division	16	2	0	0	1	0	17	2
Portsmouth	1995–96	First Division	41	3	1	0	2	0	44	3
Portsmouth	1996–97	First Division	34	3	2	0	0	0	36	3
Portsmouth	1997–98	First Division	34	10	2	0	1	0	37	10
Portsmouth	1998–99	First Division	26	7	0	0	3	0	29	7
Portsmouth	1999–2000	First Division	2	0	0	0	2	0	4	0
Portsmouth	Total		181	31	7	0	22	3	210	34
Blackpool (loan)	1999–2000	Second Division	5	1	1	1	0	0	6	2
Carlisle United	1999–2000	Third Division	22	2	0	0	1	0	23	2
Kidderminster Harriers	2000–01	Third Division	31	9	1	0	0	0	32	9
Port Vale	2001–02	Second Division	19	1	0	0	0	0	19	1
Port Vale	2002–03	Second Division	28	1	1	0	2	0	31	1
Port Vale	Total		47	2	1	0	2	0	50	2
Career total			452	91	17	2	40	5	509	98
