= Masters Football =

Six-a-side indoor football competition in the UK

Masters Football is a six-a-side indoor football competition in the United Kingdom, where players over the age of 35 are chosen by the Masters Football Selection Committee to represent a senior club for which they played. Regional heats were held, and the winners of each progressed forward to a national competition. Events were contested over the course of a single evening (usually on Saturdays or Sundays), with games played in two halves of eight minutes each. The pitch was 60 m (200 ft) by 30 m (98 ft) (the size of an international ice hockey rink), and there was no offside rule.

The competition ran from 2000 to 2011, live on the UK subscription channel Sky Sports. Following popular demand, in 2022 online streaming platform 360 Sports TV announced they would be reviving the competition.

== National Masters ==
=== Honours ===
Year	Champion	Runner-up	Grand Final venue	Golden Boot winner(s)
2000	(England) Nottingham Forest	(Scotland) Rangers	National Ice Centre (Nottingham)	(Scotland) Ally McCoist (Rangers)
2001	(England) Liverpool	(England) Bradford City	London Arena	(England) John Taylor (Bradford City)
2002	(England) Liverpool	(England) Newcastle United	Newcastle	(England) Peter Beardsley (Newcastle United)
2003	(England) Manchester City	(Scotland) Rangers	Telewest Arena, Newcastle	(England) Peter Beardsley (Newcastle United)
2004	(England) Chelsea	(England) Wolverhampton Wanderers	Hallam FM Arena, Sheffield	(England) John Durnin (Liverpool)
2005	(England) Leicester City	(England) Chelsea	M.E.N. Arena (Manchester)	(England) Paul Moran (Tottenham Hotspur)
2006	(Scotland) Rangers	(England) Chelsea	National Indoor Arena (Birmingham)	(England) John Durnin (Liverpool)
2007	(England) Leicester City	(England) Wolverhampton Wanderers	M.E.N. Arena (Manchester)	(Republic of Ireland) Owen Coyle (Motherwell)
2008	(England) Wolverhampton Wanderers	(England) Manchester City	LG Arena (Birmingham)	(England) Craig Hignett (Middlesbrough)
2009	(England) Tranmere Rovers	(England) Bolton Wanderers	Echo Arena Liverpool (Liverpool)	(Italy) Carbone / (England) Goodman / Hignett
2010	(England) Birmingham City	(England) Tranmere Rovers	LG Arena (Birmingham)	(England) Graham Stuart (Everton)
2011	(Scotland) Rangers	(England) Leeds United	M.E.N. Arena (Manchester)	(England) Darren Huckerby (Leeds United)

=== Venues ===
Venue	Location
(Scotland) Braehead Arena	Renfrew
(England) Echo Arena Liverpool	Liverpool
(England) LG Arena	Birmingham
(England) M.E.N. Arena	Manchester
(England) Metro Radio Arena	Newcastle upon Tyne
(England) National Ice Centre	Nottingham
(England) National Indoor Arena	Birmingham
(Northern Ireland) Odyssey Arena	Belfast
(England) Planet Ice Arena	Milton Keynes
(England) Sheffield Arena	Sheffield
(England) SkyDome Arena	Coventry
Wales National Ice Rink	Cardiff
(England) Wembley Arena	London

=== Referees ===
Two referees are chosen to officiate in each event, from the following list. They are all FA-endorsed except John Underhill, who is an SFA referee.

- David Elleray
- Dermot Gallagher
- Peter Jones
- Steve Lodge
- Kevin Lynch
- Uriah Rennie
- John R. Underhill
- Jeff Winter

== Home Nations ==
=== Champions ===
Year	Champion
1999	Wales Masters
2000	Wales Masters
2001	(Republic of Ireland) (Northern Ireland) All-Ireland Masters
2002	not held
2003	Wales Masters
2004	England Masters
2005	not held
2006	not held
2007	(Republic of Ireland) (Northern Ireland) All-Ireland Masters
2008	not held
2009	(Republic of Ireland) (Northern Ireland) All-Ireland Masters

== European Masters Cup ==
=== Champions ===
Year	Champion
2005	(Scotland) Rangers

== International Masters Cup ==
=== Champions ===
Year	Champion
2006	(Netherlands) Holland Masters

== Malaysia Masters Cup ==
=== Champions ===
Year	Champion
2008	(England) Liverpool
2009	(England) Manchester United
