= Alan McLoughlin =

Irish footballer (1967–2021)

Personal information
- Full name: Alan Francis McLoughlin
- Date of birth: 20 April 1967
- Place of birth: Manchester, England
- Date of death: 4 May 2021 (aged 54)
- Height: 5 ft 8 in (1.73 m)
- Position: Midfielder

Senior career*
Years	Team	Apps	(Gls)
1985–1986	Manchester United	0	(0)
1986–1990	Swindon Town	106	(19)
1987–1988	→ Torquay United (loan)	24	(4)
1990–1992	Southampton	24	(1)
1991	→ Aston Villa (loan)	0	(0)
1992–1999	Portsmouth	309	(54)
1999–2001	Wigan Athletic	22	(1)
2001–2002	Rochdale	18	(1)
2002–2003	Forest Green Rovers	12	(0)
Total		515	(80)

International career
1990–1999	Republic of Ireland	42	(2)

Managerial career
- 2016–2021: Swindon Town Academy
- * Club domestic league appearances and goals

Alan Francis McLoughlin (20 April 1967 – 4 May 2021) was an Irish professional footballer and coach, who played as a midfielder for the Republic of Ireland and various English club sides, most notably Swindon Town and Portsmouth. His most notable moment at international level was scoring the equaliser against Northern Ireland in Belfast that qualified the Republic of Ireland for the 1994 FIFA World Cup.

== Career ==
=== Manchester United ===
McLoughlin began his career as a trainee at Manchester United on leaving school in July 1983, turning professional at the start of the 1985–86 season. However, he never played a first team game for United even when featuring over 40 times for the reserves.

=== Swindon Town ===
After his release from Old Trafford, McLoughlin played in a trial tournament for Stoke City but was not signed. He featured in an exit trial match at Durham University. He was then offered a one-week trial by Oldham Athletic but joined Swindon Town in August 1986, just after they had won promotion to the Football League Third Division. He made his debut in a 2–2 draw with Newport County on 12 September 1986. However, he did not fit with then-manager Lou Macari's "long ball" style, and seven months and nine appearances later, he moved to Torquay United on loan. His Swindon career looked to be over when he returned to Torquay at the start of the following season for another loan spell, but suspensions to other players meant McLoughlin was given another chance in the first team and he soon established himself as a regular for Swindon.

It was under Macari's successor as manager, Osvaldo Ardiles, that McLoughlin really blossomed. He was an ever-present in Ardiles' first season, scoring 16 goals. He capped a fine season by scoring the winning goal in the play-off final at Wembley Stadium on 28 May 1990 against Sunderland. However, before the next season began, Swindon were demoted by The Football League for making irregular payments to players. This initially meant that Sunderland were promoted to the First Division in their place, and Swindon were demoted to the Third Division; their place in the Second Division was given to losing Third Division play-off finalists Tranmere Rovers. However, an appeal saw Swindon restored to the Second Division.

=== Southampton ===
With Swindon in financial trouble, players had to be sold, and McLoughlin left for Southampton in December 1990, for a club record £1 million. However, he failed to find the same level of form that he had at Swindon, and he was loaned first to Aston Villa and then to Portsmouth.

=== Portsmouth ===
The latter were impressed enough by McLoughlin to make a bid for him, and so in February 1992 he moved to Fratton Park for £400,000 after making only 29 appearances for the Saints. He helped Portsmouth to the 1992 FA Cup semi-final, scoring the winning goal in the quarter-final tie with Nottingham Forest, only for them to lose the semi-final to Liverpool on a penalty shoot-out. He helped Portsmouth to the brink of the Premier League in 1992–93, but they were pipped to automatic promotion by West Ham United and lost to Leicester City in the play-offs.

=== Wigan Athletic ===
In December 1999, he was sold to Wigan Athletic for £260,000. However, injuries prevented him from making a major impact and he made only 22 appearances for Wigan, scoring three goals. He scored once in the league against Gillingham. and also scored a brace in a Football League Trophy tie against Oldham Athletic.

=== Rochdale ===
McLoughlin moved on a free transfer to Rochdale in December 2001 and played his part in Rochdale reaching the play-offs in 2001–02 and scored a twice-taken penalty for them on his last league appearance against Bristol Rovers.

=== Forest Green Rovers ===
With his career winding down McLoughlin joined Forest Green as a player-coach for the 2002–03 season and also featured in Rovers FA Cup first round tie with Exeter City which was broadcast live on the BBC's Match of the Day programme. At the end of the season, McLoughlin retired from playing to concentrate on coaching with the club.

== International career ==
=== Republic of Ireland ===
McLoughlin's performances at club level won him international recognition, and he was named by Jack Charlton in the Ireland squad for the 1990 World Cup in Italy. He made his International debut on 2 June 1990 in a 3–0 friendly win against Malta. He made two appearances at the 1990 World Cup, coming on as a substitute in the matches with England and Egypt. On 17 November 1993, McLoughlin came on as a substitute and scored a 76th minute equaliser against Northern Ireland in a 1–1 draw at Windsor Park in a critical 1994 World Cup qualifier; the draw, combined with Spain's defeat of Denmark, meant that the Republic of Ireland team qualified for the 1994 World Cup in the United States. McLoughlin became the first Portsmouth player to be included in any World Cup squad since the 1958 tournament – nine years before McLoughlin himself was born. He was capped 42 times in total for the Republic of Ireland and scored two goals, his other goal coming on 2 April 1997 in a 3–2 away defeat to Macedonia.

== Media career ==
After the end of his playing career, McLoughlin returned to Portsmouth, where he became a co-commentator on the now-defunct Portsmouth-based radio station The Quay. In February 2011, he joined BBC Radio Solent as matchday co-commentator for Portsmouth matches. He stopped this when offered a role in Portsmouth coaching set up in 2011. He occasionally deputised for Guy Whittingham as co-commentator on BBC Radio Solent.

== Managerial career ==
In July 2011, he joined Portsmouth as Senior Academy Coach, working alongside other club favourites Andy Awford and Paul Hardyman. On 8 July 2013, McLoughlin was appointed Portsmouth's first-team coach. Alongside manager Guy Whittingham, he assisted the side in their first season in League Two after relegation. Whittingham was sacked in November 2013 and replaced by Richie Barker, who lasted just three months. Andy Awford then took charge for the rest of the season as along with Hardyman and McLoughlin, Portsmouth were unbeaten in their final seven matches, keeping in the league and finishing 13th. Awford was appointed permanent manager and McLoughlin kept his role as first-team manager alongside new assistant Paul Hardyman in May 2014. He was released from his position as first-team coach at Portsmouth on 4 December 2014.

== Personal life ==
Born in Manchester in 1967 to Irish parents, McLoughlin grew up on Maine Road, near to Manchester City's home ground of the same name. He lived in Swindon with his wife Debra and two daughters Abby and Megan.

McLoughlin was diagnosed with a kidney tumour in 2012 and had a successful operation. However, he later died of cancer in the kidneys, chest wall and lungs on 4 May 2021, aged 54.

== Career statistics ==
Appearances and goals by club, season and competition
Club	Season	League			FA Cup		League Cup		Other		Total	
Club	Season	Division	Apps	Goals	Apps	Goals	Apps	Goals	Apps	Goals	Apps	Goals
Swindon Town
Swindon Town	1986–87	Third Division	9	0	2	0	2	0	1 (Note: Appearances in Football League Trophy)	0	14	0
Swindon Town	1987–88	Second Division	8	0	0	0	0	0	—		8	0
Swindon Town	1988–89	Second Division	26	3	3	0	0	0	3 (Note: Appearances in play-offs (2 appearances) and Full Members' Cup (1 appearance))	0	32	3
Swindon Town	1989–90	Second Division	46	12	1	0	8	4	6 (Note: Appearances in play-offs (3 appearances, 1 goal) and Full Members' Cup (3 appearances))	1	61	17
Swindon Town	1990–91	Second Division	17	4	0	0	4	1	—		21	5
Swindon Town	Total		106	19	6	0	14	5	10	1	136	25
Torquay United (loan)
Torquay United (loan)	1986–87	Fourth Division	16	1	0	0	0	0	—		16	1
Torquay United (loan)	1987–88	Fourth Division	8	3	0	0	0	0	—		8	3
Torquay United (loan)	Total		24	4	0	0	0	0	0	0	24	4
Southampton
Southampton	1990–91	First Division	22	1	4	0	0	0	1 (Note: Appearances in Full Members' Cup)	0	27	1
Southampton	1991–92	First Division	2	0	0	0	1	0	—		3	0
Southampton	Total		24	1	4	0	1	0	1	0	30	1
Aston Villa (loan)	1991–92	First Division	0	0	0	0	0	0	1	0	1	0
Portsmouth
Portsmouth	1991–92	Second Division	14	2	3	1	0	0	—		17	3
Portsmouth	1992–93	First Division	46	9	1	0	2	2	6 (Note: Appearances in play-offs (2 appearances, 1 goal) and Anglo-Italian Cup (4 appearances))	1	55	12
Portsmouth	1993–94	First Division	38	6	2	4	7	1	3 (Note: Appearances in Anglo-Italian Cup)	0	50	11
Portsmouth	1994–95	First Division	38	6	1	0	5	0	—		44	6
Portsmouth	1995–96	First Division	40	10	1	0	1	0	—		42	10
Portsmouth	1996–97	First Division	36	5	4	2	4	0	—		44	7
Portsmouth	1997–98	First Division	37	4	2	0	2	0	—		41	4
Portsmouth	1998–99	First Division	41	7	2	0	4	3	—		47	10
Portsmouth	1999–2000	First Division	19	5	0	0	2	1	—		21	6
Portsmouth	Total		309	54	16	7	27	7	9	1	361	69
Wigan Athletic
Wigan Athletic	1999–2000	Second Division	15	1	0	0	0	0	2	0	17	1
Wigan Athletic	2000–01	Second Division	4	0	0	0	1	0	2	2	7	2
Wigan Athletic	2001–02	Second Division	3	0	0	0	0	0	1	0	4	0
Wigan Athletic	Total		22	1	0	0	1	0	5	2	28	2
Rochdale	2001–02	Third Division	18	1	0	0	0	0	2 (Note: Appearances in play-offs)	0	20	1
Forest Green Rovers	2002–03	Conference National	12	0	0	0	0	0	—		12	0
Career total			515	80	26	7	43	12	28	4	612	103

== Honours ==
Swindon Town

- Football League Second Division play-offs: 1990
- Football League Third Division play-offs: 1987

Individual

- FAI Senior International Player of the Year: 1996
- Swindon Town Player of the Year: 1990
- Swindon Town Hall of Fame
- Portsmouth Hall of Fame: 2010
