= 1993–94 Portsmouth F.C. season =

Portsmouth F.C.
1993–94 season
- Manager: Jim Smith
- Division One: 17th
- FA Cup: Third round
- League Cup: Quarter-final
- Anglo-Italian Cup: International Group Stage
- Top goalscorer: League: All: Gerry Creaney; Alan McLoughlin; 11 goals
- Highest home attendance: 25,438
- Lowest home attendance: 2,363

During the 1993–94 season, the English football club Portsmouth F.C. were placed 17th out of 24 in the Football League First Division, winning 15 matches, drawing 13 and losing 18. The team reached the quarterfinals of the League Cup and the third round of the FA Cup, in both cases being knocked out after replays.

== First Division ==
Opposing Team	For	Against	Date	Venue
Oxford United	2	3	14 August 1993	Manor Ground, Oxford
Charlton Athletic	1	2	17 August 1993	Fratton Park, Portsmouth
Luton Town	1	0	21 August 1993	Fratton Park, Portsmouth
Grimsby Town	1	1	24 August 1993	Blundell Park, Cleethorpes
Crystal Palace	1	5	28 August 1993	Selhurst Park, London
Stoke City	3	3	4 September 1993	Fratton Park, Portsmouth
Wolverhampton Wanderers	1	1	11 September 1993	Molineux, Wolverhampton
Southend United	2	1	18 September 1993	Fratton Park, Portsmouth
Bristol City	0	0	25 September 1993	Fratton Park, Portsmouth
Nottingham Forest	1	1	2 October 1993	City Ground, Nottingham
Peterborough United	2	2	9 October 1993	London Road, Peterborough
Derby County	3	2	16 October 1993	Fratton Park, Portsmouth
Notts County	1	1	23 October 1993	Meadow Lane, Nottingham
Tranmere Rovers	2	0	30 October 1993	Fratton Park, Portsmouth
Middlesbrough	2	0	2 November 1993	Fratton Park, Portsmouth
Sunderland	2	1	6 November 1993	Roker Park, Sunderland
Birmingham City	1	0	20 November 1993	St Andrew's, Birmingham
West Bromwich Albion	1	4	27 November 1993	The Hawthorns, West Bromwich
Sunderland	0	1	4 December 1993	Fratton Park, Portsmouth
Watford	2	0	7 December 1993	Fratton Park, Portsmouth
Charlton Athletic	1	0	12 December 1993	The Valley, London
Oxford United	1	1	18 December 1993	Fratton Park, Portsmouth
Millwall	0	0	27 December 1993	The Den, London
Bolton Wanderers	0	0	28 December 1993	Fratton Park, Portsmouth
Barnsley	0	2	1 January 1994	Oakwell, Barnsley
Derby County	0	1	15 January 1994	Baseball Ground, Derby
Peterborough United	0	2	22 January 1994	Fratton Park, Portsmouth
Notts County	0	0	5 February 1994	Fratton Park, Portsmouth
Tranmere Rovers	1	3	11 February 1994	Prenton Park, Birkenhead
Grimsby Town	3	1	19 February 1994	Fratton Park, Portsmouth
Luton Town	1	4	22 February 1994	Kenilworth Road, Luton
Stoke City	0	2	26 February 1994	Victoria Ground, Stoke-on-Trent
Crystal Palace	0	1	5 March 1994	Fratton Park, Portsmouth
Southend United	1	2	12 March 1994	Roots Hall, Southend-on-Sea
Wolverhampton Wanderers	3	0	15 March 1994	Fratton Park, Portsmouth
Bristol City	0	1	19 March 1994	Ashton Gate, Bristol
Nottingham Forest	2	1	26 March 1994	Fratton Park, Portsmouth
Leicester City	3	0	30 March 1994	Filbert Street, Leicester
Millwall	2	2	2 April 1994	Fratton Park, Portsmouth
Bolton Wanderers	1	1	4 April 1994	Burnden Park, Bolton
Barnsley	2	1	9 April 1994	Fratton Park, Portsmouth
Middlesbrough	2	0	16 April 1994	Ayresome Park, Middlesbrough
Birmingham City	0	2	23 April 1994	Fratton Park, Portsmouth
Leicester City	0	1	26 April 1994	Fratton Park, Portsmouth
Watford	0	1	30 April 1994	Vicarage Road, Watford
West Bromwich Albion	0	1	8 May 1994	Fratton Park, Portsmouth

Pos	Team	Pld	W	D	L	GF	GA	GD	Pts
15	Southend United	46	17	8	21	63	67	−4	59
16	Grimsby Town	46	13	20	13	52	47	+5	59
17	Portsmouth	46	15	13	18	52	58	−6	58
18	Barnsley	46	16	7	23	55	67	−12	55
19	Watford	46	15	9	22	66	80	−14	54

Source: rsssf.com
Rules for classification: 1) Points; 2) Goals scored; 3) Goal difference

== FA Cup ==
Opposing Team	For	Against	Date	Venue	Round
Blackburn Rovers	3	3	8 January 1994	Ewood Park, Blackburn	3rd Round
Blackburn Rovers	1	3	19 January 1994	Fratton Park, Portsmouth	3rd Round Replay

== League Cup ==
Opposing Team	For	Against	Date	Venue	Round
Rotherham United	0	0	21 September 1993	Millmoor, Rotherham	2nd Round 1st Leg
Rotherham United	5	0	5 October 1993	Fratton Park, Portsmouth	2nd Round 2nd Leg
Swindon Town	2	0	26 October 1993	Fratton Park, Portsmouth	3rd Round
Peterborough United	0	0	30 November 1993	London Road, Peterborough	4th Round
Peterborough United	1	0	15 December 1993	Fratton Park, Portsmouth	4th Round Replay
Manchester United	2	2	12 January 1994	Old Trafford, Manchester	Quarter Final
Manchester United	0	1	26 January 1994	Fratton Park, Portsmouth	Quarter Final Replay

== Anglo-Italian Cup ==
Opposing Team	For	Against	Date	Venue	Round
Bristol City	3	1	31 August 1993	Fratton Park, Portsmouth	Preliminary Round G4
Oxford United	2	0	14 September 1993	Manor Ground, Oxford	Preliminary Round G4
(Italy) Padova	0	0	12 October 1993	Stadio Euganeo, Padua	Group B
(Italy) Pescara	1	2	9 November 1993	Stadio Adriatico, Pescara	Group B
(Italy) Cosenza	3	0	16 November 1993	Fratton Park, Portsmouth	Group B
(Italy) Fiorentina	2	3	22 December 1993	Fratton Park, Portsmouth	Group B
