= Jimmy Carter (footballer) =

English footballer

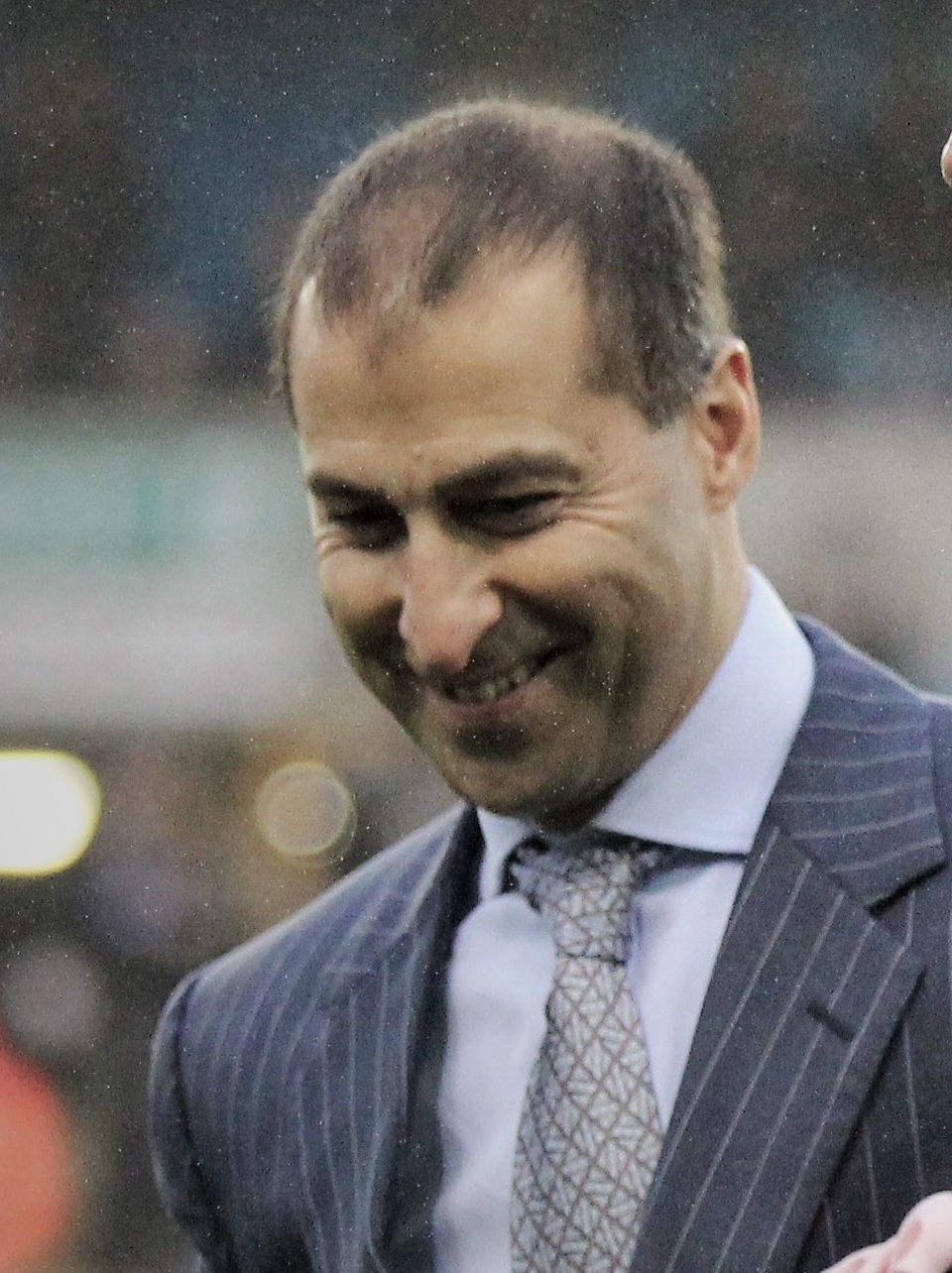
- Carter at Millwall in 2015

Personal information
- Full name: James William Charles Carter
- Date of birth: 9 November 1965 (age 60)
- Place of birth: Hammersmith, London, England
- Height: 5 ft 10 in (1.78 m)
- Position: Winger

Youth career
- 1980–1984: Crystal Palace

Senior career*
Years	Team	Apps	(Gls)
1984–1985	Crystal Palace	0	(0)
1985–1987	Queens Park Rangers	0	(0)
1987–1991	Millwall	110	(11)
1991	Liverpool	5	(0)
1991–1995	Arsenal	25	(2)
1994	→ Oxford United (loan)	5	(0)
1994–1995	→ Oxford United (loan)	4	(0)
1995–1998	Portsmouth	72	(8)
1998–1999	Millwall	16	(0)
Total		237	(21)
- * Club domestic league appearances and goals

James William Charles Carter (born 9 November 1965) is an English former footballer. Playing as a winger, Carter featured for Crystal Palace, Queens Park Rangers, Millwall, Liverpool, Arsenal, Oxford United and Portsmouth throughout his career.

== Early life ==
Carter was born on 9 November 1965, of mixed ancestry. His British surname came from a 17th-century ancestor who moved to India and married an Indian woman. His father Maurice originated from Kanpur in India, and was brought up in Lucknow. After being orphaned at 14, Maurice joined the merchant navy, came to England, and married Jimmy's English mother. When they divorced, Maurice brought up Jimmy and his brother 'as Indian kids'. Maurice (who died in January 2009) encouraged Jimmy to make it as a footballer, waking him early on frosty mornings to train.

== Career ==
Carter began his professional career aged 14 at Crystal Palace, who released him when 19, and then had a brief spell with Queens Park Rangers, but failed to make a league appearance for either club.

Millwall bought Carter from QPR in 1987 for £15,000 and gave him his Football League debut in a 0–0 draw with Oldham at The Den in the Second Division. He quickly established himself in the first team and was an integral part of the team which gained promotion to the top flight in 1987–88, the first time ever in Millwall's 100-year history. In December of that season, Sheffield United defender Chris Wilder was sent off for a crude tackle on Carter.

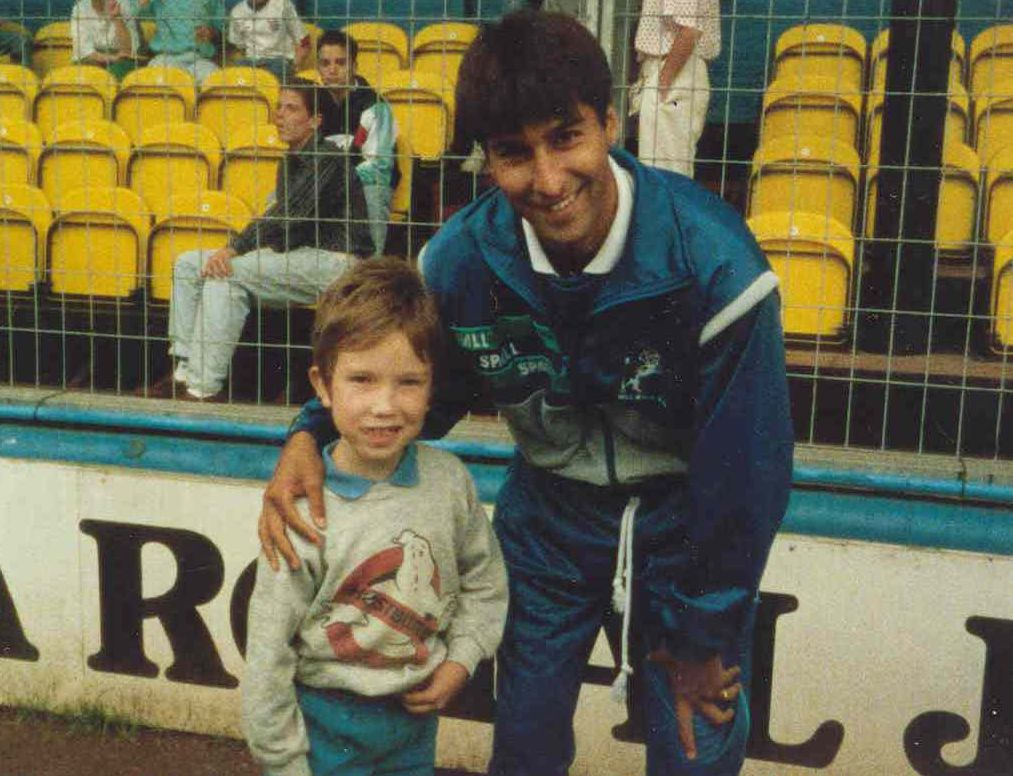
Carter whilst playing for Millwall in 1989

Carter was part of a side that included players such as Teddy Sheringham, Tony Cascarino and Terry Hurlock. Millwall made a strong start to the 1988–89 season where he went top of the league at the beginning of October and remained in the top four most of the season, before a failure to win any of their final 10 league games saw them slip to tenth, their lowest position all season. They were relegated in bottom place the following season, but Carter initially stayed with the club.

Carter left Millwall on 10 January 1991, when Kenny Dalglish signed him for Liverpool for a fee of £800,000. Dalglish resigned shortly after, with Ronnie Moran taking temporary charge of the team for two months until Graeme Souness took over in April. Carter would play eight first team games for Liverpool, and after just nine months at Anfield he was sold in a £500,000 deal to Arsenal, the club he supported as a young boy, on 8 October 1991.

He spent nearly four years at Highbury, but was never a regular first team player: Anders Limpar, Eddie McGoldrick and Glenn Helder were the usual selections in Carter's preferred position. During his time there, the club won both the FA Cup and the League Cup in 1993 and went on to win the UEFA Cup Winners' Cup in 1994, but Carter played no part in those finals, nor in the less important European Super Cup or FA Charity Shield matches. By contrast, he played the entirety of the surprise FA Cup defeat to Wrexham in January 1992. In the following season Carter was loaned out to Oxford United. In all the winger made 29 appearances for the Gunners, scoring two goals.

In the summer of 1995, with manager George Graham having left the club for disciplinary reasons in February and new coach Bruce Rioch rebuilding the team, Carter signed for Portsmouth, where he spent three years. In 1998, Carter re-signed for Millwall, but did not have the same impact as his first spell there, with the club now languishing in Division Two. He was forced to retire from football at the end of the 1998–99 season as a result of a serious back injury. Carter made 149 appearances for Millwall, scoring 13 goals in all for the Lions.

Carter has appeared for Arsenal in the Masters Cup Football competition for veteran players shown live on Sky Sports. He also plays for the Arsenal Charity Team, a team of ex Arsenal players and celebrities.

== Personal life ==
In August 1992, Carter was the second British Asian to play in the Premier League (after Robert Rosario who played three days earlier in the opening week of the new competition), although this was not known at the time as he did not publicly disclose his background and his name did not make it obvious.

Since retiring as a player, Carter has been involved in the world of property investment, and was a member of the commercial sales team at Millwall from 2015. He has also worked as freelance floor manager for televised football matches, and as a pundit and co-commentator for radio.

== Honours ==
Millwall

- Second Division: 1988

== See also ==
- British Asians in association football
