= Luke Nightingale =

English footballer (born 1980)

Personal information
- Date of birth: 22 December 1980 (age 45)
- Place of birth: Portsmouth, England
- Position: Forward

Senior career*
Years	Team	Apps	(Gls)
1998–2003	Portsmouth	44	(4)
2002–2003	→ Swindon Town (loan)	3	(0)
2003–2004	Southend United	4	(0)
2004	Weymouth		
2004–2008	Bognor Regis Town	164	(77)
2008–2010	Havant & Waterlooville	46	(12)
2010–2011	Bognor Regis Town	39	(27)
Total		300	(120)
- * Club domestic league appearances and goals

Luke Nightingale (born 22 December 1980) is an English former professional footballer who played as a forward. Having previously played for Portsmouth, Swindon, Weymouth and Southend he moved to Bognor Regis Town in 2004. He scored over 70 goals for Bognor in his four-year spell. However, on 28 March 2008, he was sold to Havant & Waterlooville in a player swap with Phil Warner. In January 2010 he returned to Bognor Regis Town, on loan for the remainder of the season, although a knee injury ended his season prematurely. Back to full fitness, he then re-joined Bognor Regis Town on a permanent basis for season 2010–11. Having started the 2011–12 season at Bognor, Nightingale announced his retirement in October 2011 after a series of knee injuries.

== Career ==
Nightingale began his football career in the youth system of Portsmouth. During the 1998–99 season Nightingale played for the youth team, reserve team and first team, scoring 20 goals. In October 1998 Nightingale was named as an unused substitute for the home tie against Bradford City with no reserve team experience behind him. On 7 November Nightingale took the trip to Bournemouth with the youth team, scoring 2 in a 3–2 victory. On 16 November Nightingale made his reserve team debut away to Reading, scoring in a 3–1 win . The next day after the Reading game Nightingale signed a 4-year professional contract under boss Alan Ball, before his debut against West Brom on 21 November. Making it a week to remember, scoring for all 3 teams with in a week and signing a professional contract.

His first team debut was on 21 November 1998 against West Bromwich Albion at Fratton Park. Having replaced the injured John Aloisi during the first half, Nightingale came off the bench to score with his second touch, in front of the Fratton End after 65 seconds. Nightingale went on to score the winner in the second half and was named "MAN of the MATCH".

He also opened the scoring for Pompey in an FA Cup tie at home to Leeds United in January 1999, although the Yorkshire club hit back to win 5–1. He later left Portsmouth and had spells at Southend United and Swindon Town. He then teamed up with his old Portsmouth teammate Steve Claridge who was appointed player/manager at Weymouth in the Dr Martins League. Nightingale found himself playing out of position as a right wingback. Weymouth narrowly missed out on winning the league after being top for most of the season to Crawley Town. Nightingale left Weymouth and signed for Bognor Regis Town in the summer of 2004.

In his opening season with Bognor Regis Town (2004–05), he was the Conference South's leading scorer with 28 goals. The following season continued in similar vein until an injury suffered in November caused him to miss much of the season. He eventually returned, scoring 19 goals in total but had it not been for the injury.

However, after four seasons of service with Bognor Regis Town, he was sold to Conference South rivals Havant & Waterlooville in March 2008, making his debut on 29 March 2008 in the 1–0 defeat against St Albans City. Following limited first team opportunities at Havant he rejoined Bognor Regis Town for the remainder of the 2010 season, then signing for the Rocks on a permanent basis for 2010–11, scoring 26 goals in 38 starts. Nightingale announced his retirement in October 2011 after a series of leg injuries.
