= Kit Symons =

Footballer and manager (born 1971)

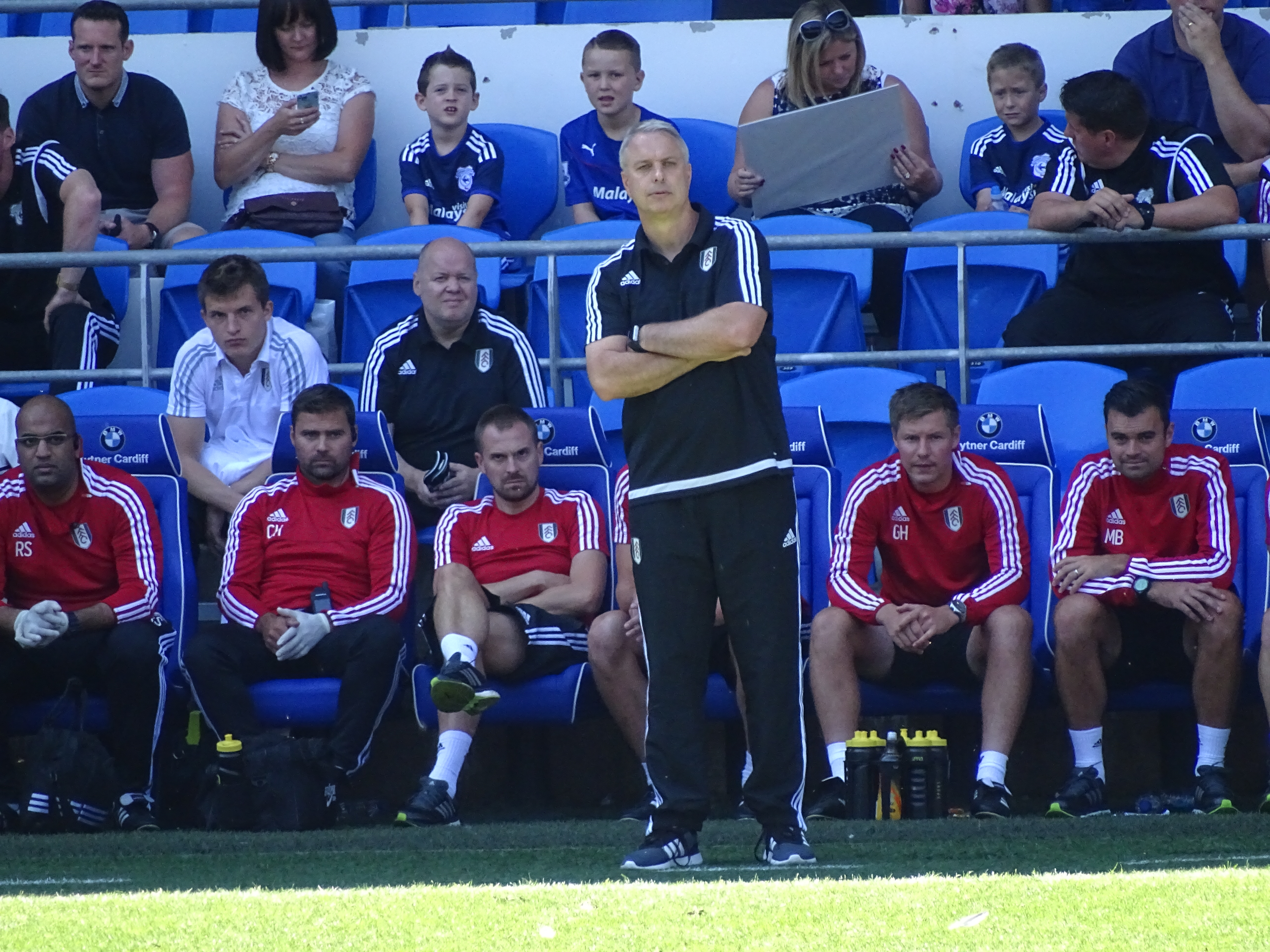
- Symons (front) as manager of Fulham in 2015

Personal information
- Full name: Christopher Jeremiah Symons
- Date of birth: 8 March 1971 (age 55)
- Place of birth: Basingstoke, England
- Height: 6 ft 2 in (1.88 m)
- Position: Defender

Youth career
- Portsmouth

Senior career*
Years	Team	Apps	(Gls)
1988–1995	Portsmouth	160	(10)
1995–1998	Manchester City	124	(4)
1998–2001	Fulham	102	(13)
2001–2005	Crystal Palace	49	(0)
Total		435	(27)

International career
1992–2001	Wales	37	(1)
	Wales B	1	

Managerial career
- 2003: Crystal Palace (caretaker)
- 2007: Crystal Palace (caretaker)
- 2008: Colchester United (caretaker)
- 2010–2014: Fulham (U18 / U21 manager)
- 2014: Fulham (caretaker)
- 2014–2015: Fulham (manager)
- 2012–2015: Wales (assistant)
- 2016–2017: Wales (assistant)
- 2017–2018: Sunderland (assistant)
- 2018–2019: Hebei (assistant)
- 2020–2023: Atromitos (assistant)
- * Club domestic league appearances and goals

Christopher Jeremiah "Kit" Symons (born 8 March 1971) is a professional association football coach and former player who was most recently assistant manager of Greek Super League side Atromitos.

As a player, he was a defender who began his career with Portsmouth before playing in the Premier League with Manchester City, Fulham and Crystal Palace. He earned 36 international caps for Wales, scoring twice.

Following retirement he has largely worked as a coach, although he was briefly manager of Fulham and had caretaker spells in charge of Crystal Palace and Colchester United. He has predominantly worked as an assistant to his former teammate Chris Coleman with Fulham, Wales, Sunderland, Hebei FC and currently Atromitos.

== Club career ==
Symons was born in Basingstoke, Hampshire. He made more than 100 league appearances for each of his first three clubs – Portsmouth, Manchester City and Fulham. He played for Fulham until December 2001, when he was signed by Crystal Palace for £400,000, the club at which he finished his playing career after 60 senior appearances.

== International career ==
Symons qualified to play for Wales because his father was from Cardiff. He won 37 caps for Wales, scoring once. His first appearance was against the Republic of Ireland on 19 February 1992 and his last appearance was on 18 February 2004 against Scotland.

== Coaching and management ==
He became caretaker manager at Palace, and following the subsequent appointment of Iain Dowie he combined the roles of player and assistant manager, as the club gained promotion to the Premier League.

After Peter Taylor was dismissed as Palace manager on 8 October 2007, Symons was confirmed as caretaker manager before the appointment of Neil Warnock three days later. Palace did not play during this time. Following Warnock's appointment, Symons stepped down from his position of assistant manager and left the club on 15 October 2007.

Symons joined Colchester United on 16 January 2008 following Micky Adams' resignation as assistant manager the previous week. He was appointed as Colchester's caretaker manager on 22 September 2008 after the departure of Geraint Williams. He led the club to two wins in five games, in the process becoming the bookie's favourite to get the job full-time. However, he left the club after Paul Lambert took over as manager on 9 October 2008.

Symons was subsequently employed by Fulham as Senior Scout and Academy Coach.

In January 2012 Symons was appointed to the Wales national team coaching staff under team manager Chris Coleman.

On 18 September 2014, Symons was confirmed as caretaker manager of Fulham following the departure of Felix Magath. On 29 October 2014, after a string of good results (5 wins in 9 games), Symons was announced as the full-time manager of Fulham. Symons stated that it was "no secret this is a club that is very close to my heart and this is a job I've always really wanted to do." Khan also stated that Symons' "passion for everything that Fulham represents came through loud and clear."

In July 2015, Symons resigned his position with the Wales national team to concentrate on his role with Fulham.

Symons was dismissed by Fulham on 8 November 2015, the day after a 5–2 defeat by Birmingham City at Craven Cottage.

Symons rejoined Wales as coach in August 2016. On 17 November 2017, Symons left his coaching role with Wales following the resignation of Chris Coleman. On 19 November 2017, Symons was announced as assistant manager at Sunderland following Coleman's appointment as manager. Both were released from their contracts after Sunderland's relegation to League One was confirmed. In June 2018, after Coleman's appointment as manager of Hebei China Fortune, Symons again joined him as assistant.

== Managerial statistics ==
As of 8 November 2015

Managerial record by team and tenure
Team	From	To	Record					Ref.
Team	From	To	P	W	D	L	Win %	Ref.
Crystal Palace (caretaker)	3 November 2003	22 December 2003	9	3	3	3	33.3	
Crystal Palace (caretaker)	8 October 2007	11 October 2007	0	0	0	0	—	
Colchester United (caretaker)	22 September 2008	11 October 2008	5	2	0	3	40.0	
Fulham	18 September 2014	8 November 2015	64	22	17	25	34.4	
Total			78	27	20	31	34.6	

== Honours ==
Fulham

- Football League First Division: 2000–01
- Football League Second Division: 1998–99
