= Gerry Creaney =

Scottish footballer

Personal information
- Full name: Gerard Thomas Creaney
- Date of birth: 13 April 1970 (age 56)
- Place of birth: Coatbridge, Scotland
- Position: Striker

Youth career
- –1987: Celtic

Senior career*
| Years | Team | Apps | (Gls) |
| 1987–1994 | Celtic | 112 | (36) |
| 1994–1995 | Portsmouth | 60 | (32) |
| 1995–1998 | Manchester City | 21 | (4) |
| 1996 | → Oldham Athletic (loan) | 9 | (2) |
| 1996 | → Ipswich Town (loan) | 6 | (1) |
| 1997 | → Burnley (loan) | 10 | (8) |
| 1998 | → Chesterfield (loan) | 4 | (0) |
| 1998–1999 | St Mirren | 12 | (3) |
| 1999 | Notts County | 16 | (3) |
| 1999 | TPV | 1 | (0) |
| 2000 | Raith Rovers | 6 | (1) |
| 2000 | Queen of the South | 1 | (0) |
| 2000 | Clydebank | 3 | (0) |
| Total | | 261 | (90) |

International career
| 1990–1992 | Scotland under-21 | 12 | (5) |
| 1995 | Scotland B | 1 | (0) |
- * Club domestic league appearances and goals

Gerard Thomas Creaney (born 13 April 1970) is a Scottish former footballer, who played as a striker.

== Career ==
Creaney began his career with Celtic, signing from the boys club and making his competitive debut in the first team on 24 March 1990 in a 0–0 draw away at Dunfermline. He played in a further five games for Celtic that season, and scored his first goal in a 1–1 draw against Dundee on 21 April 1990. Creaney featured regularly for Celtic the following season, scoring in a win against Dundee United in the league cup semi-final, then netting twice in a 3–2 win over St Mirren, scoring the winning goal in the last minute. In November 1990, Creaney played in the 1990 Scottish League Cup Final against Rangers, but Celtic lost 2–1 after extra time. In March 1991, he opened the scoring for Celtic in a 2–0 win over Rangers in a Scottish Cup tie at Parkhead. The match however is best remembered for the four red cards shown; three Rangers and one Celtic player all being sent off in a torrid second half. Creaney went on to make a total of 37 appearances for Celtic in all competitions that season, scoring 10 goals.

He played 113 times for the club, scoring 36 goals. It was during this time that he was capped for Scotland under-21, for whom he reached the 1992 European under-21 Championship semi-finals. At club level, he never fully established himself as a first choice striker with veterans such as Frank McAvennie and Charlie Nicholas still featuring prominently in the first team. Creaney's sole honour during his time in Glasgow was as a runner-up in the 1990–91 Scottish League Cup.

Creaney was transferred to Portsmouth in January 1994, going on to score 30 goals in just over 60 matches and earning a £1.5m-valued move to Manchester City eighteen months later, with City paying £500,000 and £1million-rated Paul Walsh moving to Fratton Park in exchange.

The move gave Creaney an opportunity to play Premier League football (which Portsmouth had failed to come anywhere near in spite of Creaney's fine form in Division One) where, despite scoring on his debut, he failed to prosper, scoring only four goals in his 21 City appearances. Later in the season he faced competition for the role as Uwe Rosler's strike partner from new arrival Nigel Clough, who was similarly disappointing.

He was loaned out to Oldham, Ipswich, Burnley and Chesterfield whilst at Maine Road before being released in 1999. He had brief spells at St Mirren, Notts County, Finnish side TPV, Raith Rovers and Clydebank before retiring in December 2000.

After retiring from playing football, Creaney became a qualified accountant. In January 2010 Creaney returned to football when he was named as assistant to manager Danny Drew at Bellshill Athletic. On 12 October 2010, Creaney become manager at Bellshill Athletic after Danny Drew resigned. He was appointed head of youth development at Dundee in October 2014, but left by this position by mutual consent in November 2015. He is married to Scottish Film Director Wilma Smith.

== Honours ==
Celtic

- Scottish League Cup runner-up (1): 1990–91
