= Fitzroy Simpson =

Footballer (born 1970)

Personal information
- Full name: Fitzroy Simpson
- Date of birth: 26 February 1970 (age 56)
- Place of birth: Bradford-on-Avon, England
- Height: 1.71 m (5 ft 7 in)
- Position: Midfielder

Youth career
- Swindon Town

Senior career*
Years	Team	Apps	(Gls)
1988–1992	Swindon Town	105	(9)
1992–1995	Manchester City	72	(4)
1994	→ Bristol City (loan)	4	(0)
1995–1999	Portsmouth	148	(10)
1999–2001	Heart of Midlothian	17	(0)
2001	→ Walsall (loan)	10	(1)
2001–2003	Walsall	53	(3)
2003–2004	Telford United	31	(0)
2004–2005	Linfield	6	(0)
2005–2007	Havant & Waterlooville	31	(0)
2007–2008	Eastleigh	9	(0)
Total		486	(27)

International career
1997–2003	Jamaica	43	(3)
- * Club domestic league appearances and goals

Fitzroy Simpson (born 26 February 1970) is a former professional footballer who played as a midfielder and left back from 1988 to 2008.

Simpson played in the Premier League for Manchester City, in the Scottish Premier League for Heart of Midlothian, in the Football League for Swindon Town, Bristol City, Portsmouth and Walsall, in the Irish Premier League for Linfield, and ended his career in non-league football with Telford United, Havant & Waterlooville and Eastleigh. Born in England, he represented Jamaica internationally.

== Club career ==
Simpson was born in Bradford-on-Avon, Wiltshire, he joined the youth team at nearby Swindon Town in 1987, and signed a professional contract the next year. In his debut match he was sent off for punching an opponent. Before the 1992–93 season he was sold to Premier League club Manchester City for £500,000. After a couple of seasons he struggled to stay in the first eleven, went on loan to Bristol City and was finally transferred to Portsmouth, where he played until 1999.

Heart of Midlothian signed Simpson soon after the World Cup, but it was an unhappy move, and he was offered the chance to reignite his career under Ray Graydon at Walsall. Simpson helped to revive the club's season, helping them to reach the Football League Second Division play-off final, which they went on to win. However, Simpson missed this game after picking up an injury during the semi-final. He left Walsall in the summer of 2003.

In 2003–04 he played non-league football with Telford United. He then went to play for Linfield in Northern Ireland but was released in the end of June 2005, at 35 years old.

He then announced his intention to retire from football, moving to the Costa del Sol, taking a directorship in a property firm, but in the 2005–06 season he resumed his football career with Havant & Waterlooville. He arrived at Eastleigh in October 2007 from Havant. He left the club at the end of the season and retired from football.

== International career ==
Simpson won 43 caps for Jamaica from 1997 to 2003 and scored 3 goals. He represented the 'Reggae Boyz' in all three group stage matches at the 1998 FIFA World Cup. Simpson captained his final international match.

== Career statistics ==
Scores and results list Jamaica's goal tally first, score column indicates score after each Simpson goal.

List of international goals scored by Fitzroy Simpson
No.	Date	Venue	Opponent	Score	Result	Competition
1	6 July 1997	Antigua Recreation Ground, St. John's, Antigua and Barbuda	Antigua and Barbuda	1–0	2–0	1997 Caribbean Cup
2	9 February 1998	Los Angeles Memorial Coliseum, Los Angeles, United States	El Salvador	1–0	2–0	1998 CONCACAF Gold Cup
3	2 July 2000	Independence Park, Kingston, Jamaica	Cuba	1–1	1–1	Friendly
