= Steve Claridge =

English footballer and manager (born 1966)

Personal information
- Full name: Stephen Edward Claridge
- Date of birth: 10 April 1966 (age 60)
- Place of birth: Portsmouth, England
- Height: 5 ft 11 in (1.80 m)
- Position: Striker

Youth career
- Portsmouth

Senior career*
Years	Team	Apps	(Gls)
1983–1984	Fareham Town	13	(2)
1984–1985	AFC Bournemouth	7	(1)
1985–1988	Weymouth	110	(28)
1988	Crystal Palace	0	(0)
1988–1990	Aldershot	62	(19)
1990–1992	Cambridge United	79	(28)
1992	Luton Town	16	(2)
1992–1994	Cambridge United	53	(18)
1994–1996	Birmingham City	88	(35)
1996–1998	Leicester City	63	(17)
1998	→ Portsmouth (loan)	10	(2)
1998	Wolverhampton Wanderers	5	(0)
1998–2001	Portsmouth	104	(34)
2001	→ Millwall (loan)	6	(3)
2001–2003	Millwall	85	(26)
2003–2004	Weymouth	47	(24)
2004	Brighton & Hove Albion	5	(0)
2004–2005	Brentford	4	(0)
2005	→ Wycombe Wanderers (loan)	4	(0)
2005	Wycombe Wanderers	15	(4)
2005	Millwall	0	(0)
2005	Gillingham	1	(0)
2005–2006	Bradford City	26	(5)
2006	→ Walsall (loan)	7	(1)
2006–2007	AFC Bournemouth	1	(0)
2007	Worthing	1	(0)
2007	Harrow Borough	4	(2)
2009	Weymouth	1	(1)
2011–2012	Gosport Borough	11	(4)
2017	Salisbury	1	(0)
Total		829	(256)

Managerial career
- 2000–2001: Portsmouth
- 2003–2004: Weymouth
- 2005: Millwall
- 2015–2022: Salisbury
- 2023–2025: Fleetlands
- 2025: Weymouth
- * Club domestic league appearances and goals

Stephen Edward Claridge (born 10 April 1966) is an English football pundit, coach and former professional player. He was a pundit for BBC Sport football shows including Football Focus and The Football League Show, until 2014 when he became both manager and a director at newly formed Salisbury.

Claridge's career was known for its longevity and diversity. Born in Portsmouth, he has spent a number of periods with teams from Hampshire and Dorset, having begun his career with non-league Fareham Town in 1983. He also played in the Meon Valley Football League during this period for The Limes S&SC. After failing to gain a permanent contract at local league club AFC Bournemouth, Claridge spent three years at Weymouth, in his longest single spell with any club. From 1988 till 1996 Claridge played for a number of Football League teams, before moving to Leicester City with whom he played in the Premier League and won the 1997 Football League Cup. In 1998, he moved to Portsmouth, where he was also player manager from 2000 to 2001. After a spell with Millwall, he dropped down to the Southern Premier League to work as player-manager for Weymouth. After this ended in 2004, Claridge played for ten different clubs in a variety of leagues, never spending more than a season with one team. He has played at all levels of English football and has also appeared in 1000 professional or semi-professional football matches.

After formally retiring from football in 2007, Claridge moved into media work for the BBC. His experience of the Football League has been used to position him as an expert at that level, though he works across a variety of different football programmes on the BBC. After retirement he occasionally played semi-professional football for clubs in south England, most recently in 2017 for Salisbury.

== Early years ==
Claridge was born in Portsmouth and grew up in Titchfield, a village near Fareham, and attended Brookfield Community School in Sarisbury Green. He was an adopted child.

Claridge initially played for Fareham Town in the Southern League. He got into Football League side AFC Bournemouth, though Claridge again stepped down the leagues after just seven games for Bournemouth to sign for Weymouth.

In October 1988 Claridge moved to Crystal Palace for a brief period before opting to join Fourth Division team Aldershot for the 1988–89 season. He spent two years with the club before signing with Cambridge United for £75,000. He moved with Cambridge up into the Second Division and stayed with the club for most of the next four years. His tempestuous relationship with manager John Beck, which was exacerbated by Claridge's gambling problems, eventually led to his being sold to Luton Town for only £120,000 in March 1992. With Luton in financial difficulties however he was sold back to Cambridge, for a club record £195,000 just five months later (Beck having left the club by this time).

In January 1994 Claridge moved to Birmingham City for £350,000. the following season, he became the first player since Trevor Francis to score 20 goals in a season for Birmingham, a performance that earned him the club's Player of the Year award. Claridge was transferred to Leicester City for £1.2 million in March 1996. It was with Leicester that Claridge reached the Premiership, scoring winning goals in both the 1996 play-off final that gave Leicester promotion and in the 1997 League Cup final replay. In 1997 his autobiography Tales From The Boot Camps, co-written with Ian Ridley, was first published.

== Moves into management ==
In 1998 Claridge joined hometown club Portsmouth on loan and, following a brief period at Wolverhampton Wanderers, signed for Portsmouth on a permanent basis. From 2000 this was as player-manager, though Claridge's reign lasted for just 25 games before he was demoted. After a period on loan with Millwall, he moved to the London club on a free transfer in 2001. He spent two seasons with Millwall before returning to Weymouth as the club's new player-manager. Weymouth just missed out on promotion to the Football Conference. Following Ian Ridley's resignation as chairman, Claridge also left to return to league football.

== Later playing and management career ==
In his later playing career, chronologically, Claridge played for Brighton and Hove Albion, Brentford, Wycombe Wanderers, Gillingham, Bradford City and Walsall. In the summer of 2005 he was appointed as manager of Millwall, but following board-room changes he was relieved of his duties after just 36 days, before his team had played any competitive matches. His replacement was Colin Lee. The decision to dismiss Claridge was taken by new chairman Theo Paphitis, who stated that "there was a very big chance we could get relegated" under his management. Millwall were indeed relegated from the Championship that season.

At the start of the 2006–07 season Claridge was without a club, having made 999 career appearances. Eventually, in December 2006, he re-signed for Bournemouth for a month on a pay-as-you-play basis. His 1,000th first-team match was a 4–0 defeat to Port Vale on 9 December, at the age of 40.

He played a one-off match for Isthmian League Premier Division club Worthing on 16 January 2007, a 1–1 draw with AFC Wimbledon. Two weeks later, Claridge joined divisional rivals Harrow Borough, for whom he scored on debut in a 4–4 draw with Margate.

In September 2009, Claridge came out of retirement to play unpaid for his former club, the Conference South side Weymouth, who were in severe financial difficulties.

Claridge came out of retirement once more in October 2011 when he signed for Gosport Borough of the Southern League Division One South & West as player-coach. He scored the only goal of his Gosport debut, in the FA Trophy against Southern League side Sholing; his first league goal came a week later in a 2–1 defeat of Mangotsfield United. Gosport were promoted to the Southern League Premier Division courtesy of Claridge's two goals in the play-off final against Poole Town on 7 May 2012. Having been losing 1–0, Claridge scored an equaliser in the first minute of injury time to send the tie to extra time, and completed a 3–1 win in the 98th minute to help Gosport return to the Premier Division after a 22-year absence. Immediately after the game he claimed it was "more than likely [his] last game", but later admitted he was considering playing for a further season following Gosport's promotion.

The 51-year-old Claridge made up the numbers for Salisbury in a pre-season friendly against Portsmouth in July 2017; Salisbury lost 3–0. On 15 August, he named himself as one of only four substitutes and came on for what the Salisbury Journal dubbed "a short cameo" in a Southern League Division One South & West match against Paulton Rovers that ended as a 2–2 draw. He started Salisbury's next match, a 3–2 FA Cup victory over Fareham Town, substituting himself off after 71 minutes because of broken bones that decided his retirement from playing.

In July 2023, Claridge was appointed manager of Wessex Football League Division One club Fleetlands having been a long-time friend of the chairman.

In August 2025 following the sacking of Warren Feeney, Claridge was once again appointed as manager of Weymouth. He left the club on 22 December 2025.

== Media ==
During Claridge's time at Weymouth, he and Ian Ridley, who was club chairman at the time, were two of the subjects of a BBC documentary called Football Stories; Claridge left Weymouth to work in the media, initially for BBC Radio 5 Live. He works for the BBC mainly on The Football League Show, and stated his opposition to the use of goal-line technology. He also has contributed scouting reports to The Guardian.

== Driving conviction ==
In June 2008, Claridge was convicted of dangerous driving and sentenced to six months' imprisonment, suspended for two years, after speeding at 100 mph (160 km/h) in "treacherous" conditions. He already had nine points on his driving licence.

== Managerial statistics ==
As of match played 23 December 2025

Team	From	To	Record					Ref.
Team	From	To	G	W	D	L	Win%	Ref.
Portsmouth	12 October 2000	25 February 2001	23	5	10	8	21.74	
Weymouth	1 July 2003	20 October 2004	55	26	17	12	47.27	
Millwall	21 June 2005	27 July 2005	0	0	0	0	—	
Salisbury	April 2015	13 October 2022	204	133	24	47	65.20	
Weymouth	28 August 2025	23 December 2025	27	6	6	15	22.22	
Total			309	170	57	82	55.0	

== Honours ==
Cambridge United

- Football League Third Division: 1990–91
- Football League Fourth Division play-offs: 1990

Birmingham City

- Football League Second Division: 1994–95
- Football League Trophy: 1994–95

Leicester City

- Football League First Division play-offs: 1996
- Football League Cup: 1996–97

Individual

- Aldershot Player of the Season: 1988–89
- Birmingham City Player of the Season: 1994–95
- PFA Team of the Year: 1995–96 First Division
- Portsmouth Player of the Season: 1998–99, 1999–2000
- Millwall Player of the Season: 2001–02
