= Guy Whittingham =

English footballer (born 1964)

- Whittingham in 2026

Personal information
- Date of birth: 10 November 1964 (age 61)
- Place of birth: Evesham, England
- Height: 5 ft 8 in (1.73 m)
- Position: Striker

Senior career*
Years	Team	Apps	(Gls)
1987–1988	Waterlooville	36	(22)
1988–1989	Yeovil Town	23	(18)
1989–1993	Portsmouth	160	(88)
1993–1994	Aston Villa	25	(5)
1994	→ Wolverhampton Wanderers (loan)	13	(8)
1994–1999	Sheffield Wednesday	113	(22)
1998	→ Wolverhampton Wanderers (loan)	10	(1)
1999	→ Portsmouth (loan)	9	(7)
1999	→ Watford (loan)	4	(0)
1999–2001	Portsmouth	26	(4)
2000	→ Peterborough United (loan)	5	(1)
2000	→ Oxford United (loan)	1	(1)
2001	Wycombe Wanderers	12	(1)
2003–2005	Newport (IOW)		
Total		437	(178)

Managerial career
- 2003–2005: Newport (IOW)
- 2005–2006: AFC Newbury
- 2011: Portsmouth (joint caretaker)
- 2012–2013: Portsmouth
- * Club domestic league appearances and goals

Guy Whittingham (born 10 November 1964) is an English professional football manager and former player.

As a player, he was a striker from 1988 until 2005, notably in the Premier League for Aston Villa and Sheffield Wednesday. Having started his career with non-league Yeovil Town he went on to play in the Football League for Portsmouth, Wolverhampton Wanderers, Watford, Peterborough United, Oxford United and Wycombe Wanderers. He amassed over 450 appearances throughout his career.

Following retirement, he became manager of non-League side Newport (IOW) before managing AFC Newbury. He was caretaker manager of Portsmouth from November 2012 until April 2013 when he took the role on a permanent basis before being sacked in November 2013. He later had a spell as assistant manager of Crawley Town.

== Playing career ==
Born in Evesham, after leaving the British Army, he joined Waterlooville for the start of the 1987–88 season where, after two games for the reserves, he was quickly promoted to the first team and became the club's top goalscorer in the 1987–88 season. One of his goals came in the first round proper of the F.A.Cup against Aylesbury United. He then spent a season at Yeovil Town before, in the summer of 1989, he was signed by Portsmouth, where he then spent the majority of his career, scoring 99 times in 173 league appearances, including Pompey's former record of 42 league goals in the 1992–93 season (48 in all competitions) as the club missed out on automatic promotion to the Premier League on goals scored. He was known while at Fratton Park as "Corporal Punishment". In 1993 he signed for Aston Villa in the Premier League. He had a good run in the team and scored important goals against Everton, Arsenal and Sheffield United, before leaving on loan in February 1994 to join Wolverhampton Wanderers; this meant he missed out on Villa's victory in the 1994 Football League Cup final. He scored eight goals in 13 Division One appearances for Wolves, although it wasn't enough for the Molineux side to reach the playoffs. While he was at Wolves, manager Graham Turner was replaced by Graham Taylor, who decided against making Whittingham's move permanent.

In December 1994 he joined Sheffield Wednesday, proving to be very popular at the Owls. Whilst at Wednesday he had a second loan spell at Wolves, as well as being loaned to Watford and Portsmouth, finally returning to Fratton Park on a permanent basis in 1999. At Portsmouth during his loan spell his seven goals in nine matches helped the club avoid relegation to the third tier.

In the 2000–01 season, his last as a professional, he scored for three clubs, notching for Peterborough United (against Oldham Athletic), Oxford United (against Swindon Town) and Wycombe Wanderers (against Bristol City). He also featured in Wycombe's FA Cup semi-final against Liverpool. This was the second time that Whittingham had been denied in an FA Cup semi-final by the Merseyside team, having lost in a penalty shootout to Liverpool whilst at Portsmouth in 1992.

== Managerial and coaching career ==
Whittingham later went on to become player-manager of Newport (IOW), but left them in May 2005 when the club ran into financial difficulties. He returned to management at AFC Newbury but when that club suffered financial difficulties and the loss of their ground, Whittingham left in June 2006. In August 2006 he took up a coaching role at Eastleigh. In January 2009, he joined the Portsmouth first-team coaching staff as development coach.

He was named joint caretaker manager of Portsmouth together with Stuart Gray on 14 October 2011, when Steve Cotterill left to become manager of Nottingham Forest. The next day the pair won their first game in charge against Barnsley 2–0 at Fratton Park.

Whittingham once again became caretaker manager of the south coast club following Michael Appleton leaving to take the vacant position at Blackpool, and stayed as caretaker until the club exited administration in April 2013, with his full-time appointing imminent. On 25 November 2013, Whittingham was relieved from his duties following a meeting with the Portsmouth board. The 2–1 loss to Southend proved to be his last game in charge on the south coast.

Whittingham was appointed first team coach at Crawley on Friday 13 December 2013. Whittingham left the club in April 2014 when it was "mutually agreed" that his contract would not be renewed.

Whittingham joined the FA as a coach educator on 1 August 2014.

== Managerial statistics ==
As of 23 November 2013

Team	From	To	Record				
Team	From	To	G	W	D	L	Win %
Portsmouth	7 November 2012	25 November 2013	51	11	15	25	21.57
Total			51	11	15	25	21.57

== Honours ==
Individual

- PFA Team of the Year: 1992–93 First Division
