= 1986–87 Liverpool F.C. season =

English football club season

Liverpool
1986–87 season
- Chairman: John W Smith
- Manager: Kenny Dalglish
- First Division: 2nd
- FA Cup: Third round
- League Cup: Runners-up
- Super Cup: Winners
- FA Charity Shield: Title shared
- Top goalscorer: League: Ian Rush (30); All: Ian Rush (40)
- Highest home attendance: 44,827 (v Everton, League, 25 Apr)
- Lowest home attendance: 13,498 (v Fulham, League Cup, 23 Sept)
- Average home league attendance: 36,284
| Home colours | Away colours | Third colours |

The 1986–87 season was Liverpool Football Club's 95th season in existence and their 25th consecutive season in the First Division. It was their second season under the management of Kenny Dalglish, and as defending double winners they finished this season only having (jointly) won the FA Charity Shield, coming close to silverware as league runners-up and losing finalists in the League Cup. They finished runners-up in the league nine points behind local rivals Everton, after an eventful title race which had seen them fight out with a resurgent Arsenal and Tottenham Hotspur as well as face surprise challenges during the season from unfancied sides including Norwich City, Luton Town and newly promoted Wimbledon.

At the end of the season, striker Ian Rush headed to Italy to sign for Juventus. His successor in the Liverpool attack, John Aldridge, had been signed during the season from Oxford United. After the season ended, Dalglish further enhanced Liverpool's forward positions with a move for Newcastle United striker Peter Beardsley and Watford winger John Barnes.

== Squad ==
Goalkeepers

- (South Africa) Bruce Grobbelaar
- (England) Mike Hooper

Defenders

- (England) Gary Ablett
- (Republic of Ireland) Jim Beglin
- (Scotland) Gary Gillespie
- (Scotland) Alan Hansen
- (Republic of Ireland) Mark Lawrenson
- (Scotland) John McGregor
- (Scotland) Steve Nicol
- (Republic of Ireland) Steve Staunton
- (England) Barry Venison
- (England) Alex Watson

Midfielders

- (Scotland) Kenny Dalglish
- (Australia) Craig Johnston
- (England) Sammy Lee
- (Scotland) Kevin MacDonald
- (England) Steve McMahon
- (Denmark) Jan Mølby
- (Republic of Ireland) Brian Mooney
- (Scotland) Steve Nicol
- (England) Mark Seagraves
- (England) Nigel Spackman
- (Scotland) John Wark
- (Republic of Ireland) Ronnie Whelan

Attackers

- (Republic of Ireland) John Aldridge
- (England) John Durnin
- (Scotland) Alan Irvine
- (Wales) Ian Rush
- (England) Paul Walsh

== Squad statistics ==
=== Appearances and goals ===
| No. | Pos | Nat | Player | Total | | Division 1 | | FA Cup | | Charity Shield | | League Cup | | Super Cup | |
| No. | Pos | Nat | Player | Apps | Goals | Apps | Goals | Apps | Goals | Apps | Goals | Apps | Goals | Apps | Goals |
|---|---|---|---|---|---|---|---|---|---|---|---|---|---|---|---|
| | DF | (England) ENG | Gary Ablett | 6 | 1 | 5+0 | 1 | 0+1 | 0 | 0+0 | 0 | 0+0 | 0 | 0+0 | 0 |
| | FW | (Republic of Ireland) IRL | John Aldridge | 10 | 2 | 2+8 | 2 | 0+0 | 0 | 0+0 | 0 | 0+0 | 0 | 0+0 | 0 |
| | DF | (Republic of Ireland) IRL | Jim Beglin | 30 | 0 | 20+0 | 0 | 1+0 | 0 | 1+0 | 0 | 6+0 | 0 | 2+0 | 0 |
| | FW | (Scotland) SCO | Kenny Dalglish | 25 | 8 | 12+6 | 6 | 0+0 | 0 | 0+1 | 0 | 4+1 | 2 | 1+0 | 0 |
| | FW | (England) ENG | John Durnin | 1 | 0 | 0+0 | 0 | 0+0 | 0 | 0+0 | 0 | 1+0 | 0 | 0+0 | 0 |
| | DF | (Scotland) SCO | Gary Gillespie | 51 | 0 | 37+0 | 0 | 3+0 | 0 | 0+0 | 0 | 9+0 | 0 | 2+0 | 0 |
| | GK | (Zimbabwe) ZIM | Bruce Grobbelaar | 45 | 0 | 31+0 | 0 | 3+0 | 0 | 1+0 | 0 | 9+0 | 0 | 1+0 | 0 |
| | DF | (Scotland) SCO | Alan Hansen | 53 | 0 | 39+0 | 0 | 3+0 | 0 | 1+0 | 0 | 9+0 | 0 | 1+0 | 0 |
| | GK | (England) ENG | Mike Hooper | 13 | 0 | 11+0 | 0 | 0+0 | 0 | 0+1 | 0 | 0+0 | 0 | 1+0 | 0 |
| | FW | (Scotland) SCO | Alan Irvine | 4 | 0 | 0+2 | 0 | 0+1 | 0 | 0+0 | 0 | 0+1 | 0 | 0+0 | 0 |
| | MF | (Australia) AUS | Craig Johnston | 37 | 3 | 27+1 | 3 | 3+0 | 0 | 1+0 | 0 | 5+0 | 0 | 0+0 | 0 |
| | DF | (Republic of Ireland) IRL | Mark Lawrenson | 49 | 0 | 35+0 | 0 | 3+0 | 0 | 1+0 | 0 | 8+0 | 0 | 2+0 | 0 |
| | MF | (Scotland) SCO | Kevin MacDonald | 8 | 0 | 3+3 | 0 | 0+0 | 0 | 1+0 | 0 | 0+0 | 0 | 1+0 | 0 |
| | MF | (England) ENG | Steve McMahon | 55 | 14 | 37+5 | 5 | 1+0 | 0 | 1+0 | 0 | 9+0 | 8 | 2+0 | 1 |
| | MF | (Denmark) DEN | Jan Mølby | 47 | 12 | 34+0 | 7 | 3+0 | 0 | 1+0 | 0 | 7+0 | 5 | 1+1 | 0 |
| | MF | (Republic of Ireland) IRL | Brian Mooney | 1 | 0 | 0+0 | 0 | 0+0 | 0 | 0+0 | 0 | 0+1 | 0 | 0+0 | 0 |
| | MF | (Scotland) SCO | Steve Nicol | 21 | 5 | 14+0 | 3 | 0+0 | 0 | 0+0 | 0 | 5+0 | 1 | 2+0 | 1 |
| | FW | (Wales) WAL | Ian Rush | 57 | 40 | 42+0 | 30 | 3+0 | 0 | 1+0 | 1 | 9+0 | 4 | 2+0 | 5 |
| | MF | (England) ENG | Nigel Spackman | 14 | 0 | 12+0 | 0 | 0+0 | 0 | 0+0 | 0 | 1+1 | 0 | 0+0 | 0 |
| | DF | (England) ENG | Barry Venison | 44 | 0 | 31+2 | 0 | 2+0 | 0 | 1+0 | 0 | 4+2 | 0 | 1+1 | 0 |
| | FW | (England) ENG | Paul Walsh | 31 | 6 | 23+0 | 6 | 2+0 | 0 | 0+0 | 0 | 4+1 | 0 | 0+1 | 0 |
| | MF | (Scotland) SCO | John Wark | 17 | 7 | 8+3 | 5 | 2+0 | 0 | 0+0 | 0 | 2+1 | 2 | 0+1 | 0 |
| | MF | (Republic of Ireland) IRL | Ronnie Whelan | 53 | 5 | 39+0 | 3 | 3+0 | 0 | 1+0 | 0 | 8+0 | 2 | 2+0 | 0 |

== Transfers ==
=== In ===
| Pos | Player | From | Fee | Date |
|---|---|---|---|---|
| DF | (England) Barry Venison | (England) Sunderland | £200,000 | 31 July 1986 |
| DF | (Republic of Ireland) Steve Staunton | (Republic of Ireland) Dundalk | £20,000 | 2 September 1986 |
| FW | (Scotland) Alan Irvine | (Scotland) Falkirk | £75,000 | October 1986 |
| FW | (Republic of Ireland) John Aldridge | (England) Oxford United | £750,000 | 27 January 1987 |
| MF | (England) Nigel Spackman | (England) Chelsea | £400,000 | 24 February 1987 |

=== Out ===
| Pos | Player | To | Fee | Date |
|---|---|---|---|---|
| MF | (England) Sammy Lee | (England) QPR | £200,000 | August 1986 |

== League table ==
| Pos | Team | Pld | W | D | L | GF | GA | GD | Pts | Qualification or relegation |
|---|---|---|---|---|---|---|---|---|---|---|
| 1 | Everton (C) | 42 | 26 | 8 | 8 | 76 | 31 | +45 | 86 | Disqualified from the European Cup |
| 2 | Liverpool | 42 | 23 | 8 | 11 | 72 | 42 | +30 | 77 | Disqualified from the UEFA Cup |
| 3 | Tottenham Hotspur | 42 | 21 | 8 | 13 | 68 | 43 | +25 | 71 | Disqualified from the UEFA Cup |
| 4 | Arsenal (Note: Arsenal would have qualified as League Cup winners.) | 42 | 20 | 10 | 12 | 58 | 35 | +23 | 70 | Disqualified from the UEFA Cup |
| 5 | Norwich City | 42 | 17 | 17 | 8 | 53 | 51 | +2 | 68 | |

Source: World Football
Rules for classification: 1) Points; 2) Goal difference; 3) Goals scored
(C) Champions

== Matches ==
=== First Division ===
| Date | Opponents | Venue | Result | Scorers | Attendance | Report 1 | Report 2 |
|---|---|---|---|---|---|---|---|
| 23-Aug-86 | Newcastle United | A | 2–0 | Rush 5', 83' | 33,306 | Report | Report |
| 25-Aug-86 | Manchester City | H | 0–0 | | 39,989 | Report | Report |
| 30-Aug-86 | Arsenal | H | 2–1 | Mølby (pen 19) Rush 57' | 38,637 | Report | Report |
| 03-Sep-86 | Leicester City | A | 1–2 | Dalglish 85' | 16,344 | Report | Report |
| 06-Sep-86 | West Ham United | A | 5–2 | Whelan 24' Johnston 51' Dalglish 66', 90' Rush 70' | 29,807 | Report | Report |
| 13-Sep-86 | Charlton Athletic | H | 2–0 | Mølby (pen 56) Rush 80' | 37,413 | Report | Report |
| 20-Sep-86 | Southampton | A | 1–2 | McMahon 62' | 20,452 | Report | Report |
| 27-Sep-86 | Aston Villa | H | 3–3 | Wark (pen 24), 43' McMahon 79' | 38,298 | Report | Report |
| 04-Oct-86 | Wimbledon | A | 3–1 | Mølby 50' Rush 56', 90' | 15,978 | Report | Report |
| 11-Oct-86 | Tottenham Hotspur | H | 0–1 | | 43,139 | Report | Report |
| 18-Oct-86 | Oxford United | H | 4–0 | Rush 29', 89' Dalglish 33' Mølby (pen 53) | 34,512 | Report | Report |
| 25-Oct-86 | Luton Town | A | 1–4 | Mølby (pen 81) | 13,140 | Report | Report |
| 01-Nov-86 | Norwich City | H | 6–2 | Nicol 15' Walsh 30', 58', 75' Rush 48', 70' | 36,915 | Report | Report |
| 08-Nov-86 | Queens Park Rangers | A | 3–1 | Rush 9' Nicol 15' Johnston 76' | 24,045 | Report | Report |
| 16-Nov-86 | Sheffield Wednesday | H | 1–1 | Rush 58' | 28,020 | Report | Report |
| 23-Nov-86 | Everton | A | 0–0 | | 48,247 | Report | Report |
| 29-Nov-86 | Coventry City | H | 2–0 | Mølby (pen 24) Wark 90' | 31,614 | Report | Report |
| 06-Dec-86 | Watford | A | 0–2 | | 23,954 | Report | Report |
| 14-Dec-86 | Chelsea | H | 3–0 | Whelan 31' Rush 51' Nicol 78' | 25,856 | Report | Report |
| 20-Dec-86 | Charlton Athletic | A | 0–0 | | 16,564 | Report | Report |
| 26-Dec-86 | Manchester United | H | 0–1 | | 40,663 | Report | Report |
| 27-Dec-86 | Sheffield Wednesday | A | 1–0 | Rush 64' | 40,959 | Report | Report |
| 01-Jan-87 | Nottingham Forest | A | 1–1 | Rush 88' | 32,854 | Report | Report |
| 03-Jan-87 | West Ham United | H | 1–0 | McMahon 86' | 41,286 | Report | Report |
| 17-Jan-87 | Manchester City | A | 1–0 | Rush 72' | 35,336 | Report | Report |
| 24-Jan-87 | Newcastle United | H | 2–0 | Walsh 53' Rush 79' | 38,054 | Report | Report |
| 14-Feb-87 | Leicester City | H | 4–3 | Rush 29', 47', 86' Walsh 30' | 34,259 | Report | Report |
| 21-Feb-87 | Aston Villa | A | 2–2 | Johnston 1' Walsh 62' | 32,093 | Report | Report |
| 28-Feb-87 | Southampton | H | 1–0 | Aldridge 60' | 33,133 | Report | Report |
| 07-Mar-87 | Luton Town | H | 2–0 | Mølby (pen 17) Own goal 39' | 32,433 | Report | Report |
| 10-Mar-87 | Arsenal | A | 1–0 | Rush 20' | 47,777 | Report | Report |
| 14-Mar-87 | Oxford United | A | 3–1 | Wark 35', 63' Rush 53' | 14,211 | Report | Report |
| 18-Mar-87 | Queens Park Rangers | H | 2–1 | Rush 18', 71' | 28,988 | Report | Report |
| 22-Mar-87 | Tottenham Hotspur | A | 0–1 | | 32,763 | Report | Report |
| 28-Mar-87 | Wimbledon | H | 1–2 | Dalglish 47' | 36,409 | Report | Report |
| 11-Apr-87 | Norwich City | A | 1–2 | Rush 36' | 22,879 | Report | Report |
| 18-Apr-87 | Nottingham Forest | H | 3–0 | Dalglish 34' Whelan 51' Ablett 68' | 37,359 | Report | Report |
| 20-Apr-87 | Manchester United | A | 0–1 | | 54,103 | Report | Report |
| 25-Apr-87 | Everton | H | 3–1 | McMahon 9' Rush 45', 85' | 44,827 | Report | Report |
| 02-May-87 | Coventry City | A | 0–1 | | 26,709 | Report | Report |
| 04-May-87 | Watford | H | 1–0 | Rush 82' | 40,150 | Report | Report |
| 09-May-87 | Chelsea | A | 3–3 | Rush 9' McMahon 77' Aldridge 84' | 29,245 | Report | Report |

=== FA Charity Shield ===
16 August 1986
15:00

| Liverpool | 1–1 | Everton |
|---|---|---|
| Rush 88' | Report | Heath 80' |

Wembley Stadium, London
Attendance: 88,231
Referee: Neil Midgley (Salford)

| Liverpool | Everton |

| 1 | (Zimbabwe) Bruce Grobbelaar | (substituted off) 57' |
| 2 | (England) Barry Venison |
| 3 | (Republic of Ireland) Jim Beglin |
| 4 | (Republic of Ireland) Mark Lawrenson |
| 5 | (Republic of Ireland) Ronnie Whelan |
| 6 | (Scotland) Alan Hansen (c) |
| 7 | (England) Steve McMahon |
| 8 | (Australia) Craig Johnston |
| 9 | (Wales) Ian Rush |
| 10 | (Denmark) Jan Mølby |
| 11 | (Scotland) Kevin MacDonald | (substituted off) 65' |
Substitutes:
| 17 | (England) Mike Hooper | (substituted on) 57' |
| 12 | (Scotland) Kenny Dalglish | (substituted on) 65' |
Manager:
(Scotland) Kenny Dalglish

| 1 | (England) Bobby Mimms |
| 2 | (England) Alan Harper |
| 3 | (England) Paul Power |
| 4 | (Wales) Kevin Ratcliffe (c) |
| 5 | (England) Ian Marshall |
| 6 | (England) Kevin Langley |
| 7 | (England) Trevor Steven |
| 8 | (England) Adrian Heath |
| 9 | (Scotland) Graeme Sharp |
| 10 | (England) Kevin Richardson |
| 11 | (Republic of Ireland) Kevin Sheedy | (substituted off) 57' |
Substitutes:
| 14 | (England) Neil Adams | (substituted on) 57' (substituted off) 84' |
| 12 | (England) Paul Wilkinson | (substituted on) 84' |
Manager:
(England) Howard Kendall

=== FA Cup ===
| Date | Opponents | Venue | Result | Scorers | Attendance | Report 1 | Report 2 |
|---|---|---|---|---|---|---|---|
| 11-Jan-87 | Luton Town | A | 0–0 | | 11,085 | Report | Report |
| 26-Jan-87 | Luton Town | H | 0–0 | | 34,822 | Report | Report |
| 28-Jan-87 | Luton Town | A | 0–3 | | 14,687 | Report | Report |

=== League Cup ===
| Date | Opponents | Venue | Result | Scorers | Attendance | Report 1 | Report 2 |
|---|---|---|---|---|---|---|---|
| 23-Sep-86 | Fulham | H | 10–0 | Rush 8', 76' Wark 10', 63' Whelan 28' McMahon 44', 66', 71', 79' Nicol 83' | 13,498 | Report | Report |
| 07-Oct-86 | Fulham | A | 3–2 | McMahon 2' Own goal 6' Mølby (pen 43) | 7,864 | Report | Report |
| 29-Oct-86 | Leicester City | H | 4–1 | McMahon 5', 7', 60' Dalglish 30' | 20,248 | Report | Report |
| 19-Nov-86 | Coventry City | A | 0–0 | | 26,385 | Report | Report |
| 26-Nov-86 | Coventry City | H | 3–1 | Mølby (pen 4) | 19,179 | Report | Report |
| 21-Jan-87 | Everton | A | 1–0 | Rush 83' | 53,323 | Report | Report |
| 11-Feb-87 | Southampton | A | 0–0 | | 22,818 | Report | Report |
| 25-Feb-87 | Southampton | H | 3–0 | Whelan 67' Dalglish 75' Mølby 85' | 38,481 | Report | Report |

Final

5 April 1987
15:15 BST

| Arsenal | 2–1 | Liverpool |
|---|---|---|
| Nicholas 30', 83' | Report; Report | Rush 23' |

Wembley, London
Attendance: 96,000
Referee: Lester Shapter (Devon)

| Arsenal | Liverpool |

| GK | 1 | John Lukic |
| RB | 2 | Viv Anderson |
| LB | 3 | Kenny Sansom (Captain) |
| CM | 4 | Steve Williams |
| CB | 5 | David O'Leary |
| CB | 6 | Tony Adams |
| RM | 7 | David Rocastle |
| CM | 8 | Paul Davis |
| CF | 9 | Niall Quinn | Substituted off |
| CF | 10 | Charlie Nicholas |
| LM | 11 | Martin Hayes | Substituted off |
Substitutes:
| MF | 12 | Perry Groves | (substituted on) Quinn' |
| MF | 14 | Michael Thomas | (substituted on) Hayes' |
Manager:
George Graham

| GK | 1 | Bruce Grobbelaar |
| RB | 2 | Gary Gillespie |
| LB | 3 | Barry Venison |
| CM | 4 | Nigel Spackman |
| LM | 5 | Ronnie Whelan |
| CB | 6 | Alan Hansen (Captain) |
| CF | 7 | Paul Walsh | (substituted off) 73' |
| RM | 8 | Craig Johnston |
| CF | 9 | Ian Rush |
| CM | 10 | Jan Molby |
| CM | 11 | Steve McMahon | (substituted off) 87' |
Substitutes:
| FW | 12 | Kenny Dalglish | (substituted on) 73' |
| MF | 14 | John Wark | (substituted on) 87' |
Player / Manager:
Kenny Dalglish

=== Super Cup ===
Final First Leg

16 September 1986

| Liverpool | 3–1 | Everton |
|---|---|---|
| Rush 6', 65'; McMahon 56' | Report; Report | Sheedy 40' |

Anfield, Liverpool
Attendance: 20,660

| Liverpool | Everton |

LIVERPOOL:
| GK | 1 | (England) Mike Hooper |
| RB | 2 | (England) Barry Venison |
| LB | 3 | (Republic of Ireland) Jim Beglin |
| CB | 4 | (Republic of Ireland) Mark Lawrenson |
| LM | 5 | (Republic of Ireland) Ronnie Whelan | Substituted off |
| CB | 6 | (Scotland) Gary Gillespie |
| SS | 7 | (Scotland) Kenny Dalglish |
| RM | 8 | (Scotland) Steve Nicol |
| CF | 9 | (Wales) Ian Rush |
| CM | 10 | (Scotland) Kevin MacDonald |
| CM | 11 | (England) Steve McMahon |
Substitute:
| MF | 12 | (Scotland) John Wark |
| MF | 14 | (Denmark) Jan Mølby | Substituted on |
Player/Manager:
(Scotland) Kenny Dalglish

EVERTON:
| GK | 1 | (England) Bobby Mimms |
| RB | 2 | (England) Peter Billing |
| LB | 3 | (England) Paul Power |
| CB | 4 | (Wales) Kevin Ratcliffe (c) |
| CB | 5 | (England) Ian Marshall |
| CM | 6 | (England) Kevin Langley |
| RM | 7 | (England) Neil Adams |
| ST | 8 | (England) Paul Wilkinson |
| ST | 9 | (Scotland) Graeme Sharp |
| CM | 10 | (England) Trevor Steven |
| LM | 11 | (Republic of Ireland) Kevin Sheedy | Substituted off |
Substitute:
| MF | | (England) Warren Aspinall | Substituted on |
Manager:
(England) Howard Kendall

Second leg

30 September 1986

| Everton | 1–4 | Liverpool |
|---|---|---|
| Sharp 30' | Report; Report | Rush 10', 27', 84'; Nicol 62' |

Goodison Park, Liverpool
Attendance: 26,068

| Everton | Liverpool |

EVERTON:
| GK | 1 | (England) Bobby Mimms |
| RB | 2 | (England) Peter Billing |
| LB | 3 | (England) Paul Power |
| CB | 4 | (Wales) Kevin Ratcliffe (c) |
| CB | 5 | (England) Derek Mountfield |
| CM | 6 | (England) Trevor Steven |
| RM | 7 | (England) Neil Adams |
| CM | 8 | (England) Adrian Heath |
| ST | 9 | (Scotland) Graeme Sharp |
| ST | 10 | (England) Paul Wilkinson |
| LM | 11 | (Republic of Ireland) Kevin Sheedy | Substituted off |
Substitute:
| MF | | (England) Warren Aspinall | Substituted on Substituted off |
| DF | | (England) Neil Pointon | Substituted on |
Manager:
(England) Howard Kendall

LIVERPOOL:
| GK | 1 | (Zimbabwe) Bruce Grobbelaar |
| RB | 2 | (Scotland) Gary Gillespie |
| LB | 3 | (Republic of Ireland) Jim Beglin |
| CB | 4 | (Republic of Ireland) Mark Lawrenson |
| LM | 5 | (Republic of Ireland) Ronnie Whelan |
| CB | 6 | (Scotland) Alan Hansen (c) |
| SS | 7 | (Scotland) John Wark |
| RM | 8 | (Scotland) Steve Nicol | Substituted off |
| CF | 9 | (Wales) Ian Rush |
| CM | 10 | (Denmark) Jan Mølby |
| CM | 11 | (England) Steve McMahon |
Substitute:
| FW | 12 | (England) Paul Walsh |
| DF | 14 | (England) Barry Venison | Substituted on |
Player/Manager:
(Scotland) Kenny Dalglish

Liverpool won 7–2 on aggregate

=== Dubai Super Cup ===
| Date | Opponents | Venue | Result | Scorers | Attendance | Report 1 | Report 2 |
|---|---|---|---|---|---|---|---|
| 9-Dec-86 | Celtic | N | 1–1 (Liverpool win 4–2 on pens) | Hansen 89' | 15,000 | Report | |
