= 1985–86 Liverpool F.C. season =

English football club season

Liverpool F.C.
1985–86 season
- Chairman: John W Smith
- Manager: Kenny Dalglish
- First Division: Champions
- FA Cup: Winners
- League Cup: Semi-finals
- Screen Sport Super Cup: Final (Played in 1986-87)
- Top goalscorer: League: Ian Rush (22); All: Ian Rush (33)
Home colours	Away colours	Third colours

The 1985–86 season was Liverpool Football Club's 94th season in existence and their 24th consecutive season in the First Division. This was Kenny Dalglish’s first season as manager. At 34 he was player manager, and with several players in their last seasons as players. The change to the new team would take time during the season, but it ended with them winning the double of the League and FA Cup, and reaching the League Cup semi-finals. It was the fifth time that the league and FA Cup double had been achieved in English football.

As there was a ban on English clubs participating in the European competitions after the Heysel disaster, there was the ScreenSport Super Cup replacing it. As the competition did not end until the 1986-87 season, Liverpool reached the final after getting through the group, and the semi-finals.

== Squad ==
Note: Flags indicate national team as defined under FIFA eligibility rules; some limited exceptions apply. Players may hold more than one non-FIFA nationality.

Pos.	Nation	Player
GK	ENG	Bob Bolder
GK	RSA	Bruce Grobbelaar
GK	ENG	Chris Pile
DF	ENG	Gary Ablett
DF	IRL	Jim Beglin
DF	SCO	Gary Gillespie
DF	SCO	Alan Hansen
DF	SCO	Steve Nicol
DF	ENG	Alan Kennedy
DF	IRL	Mark Lawrenson
DF	SCO	John McGregor
DF	ENG	Phil Neal (joined Bolton in December 1985)

Pos.	Nation	Player
MF	AUS	Craig Johnston
MF	ENG	Sammy Lee
MF	SCO	Kevin MacDonald
MF	ENG	Steve McMahon
MF	DEN	Jan Mølby
MF	ENG	Mark Seagraves
MF	SCO	John Wark
MF	IRL	Ronnie Whelan
FW	WAL	Ian Rush
FW	SCO	Kenny Dalglish
FW	ENG	Paul Walsh

== Squad statistics ==
=== Appearances and goals ===
No.	Pos	Nat	Player	Total		Division 1		FA Cup		League Cup		Super Cup	
No.	Pos	Nat	Player	Apps	Goals	Apps	Goals	Apps	Goals	Apps	Goals	Apps	Goals
	DF	(Republic of Ireland) IRL	Jim Beglin	53	1	34+0	1	7+0	0	7+0	0	5+0	0
	FW	(Scotland) SCO	Kenny Dalglish	31	7	17+4	3	6+0	1	2+0	1	2+0	2
	DF	(Scotland) SCO	Gary Gillespie	24	3	14+0	3	5+0	0	2+0	0	2+1	0
	GK	(Zimbabwe) ZIM	Bruce Grobbelaar	63	0	42+0	0	8+0	0	7+0	0	6+0	0
	DF	(Scotland) SCO	Alan Hansen	60	0	41+0	0	8+0	0	7+0	0	4+0	0
	MF	(Australia) AUS	Craig Johnston	60	10	38+3	7	6+1	1	7+0	1	5+0	1
	DF	(England) ENG	Alan Kennedy	8	0	8+0	0	0+0	0	0+0	0	0+0	0
	DF	(England) ENG	Mark Lawrenson	58	5	36+2	3	7+0	1	7+0	0	6+0	1
	MF	(England) ENG	Sammy Lee	26	0	13+2	0	3+0	0	3+0	0	5+0	0
	MF	(Scotland) SCO	Kevin MacDonald	25	5	10+7	1	2+0	1	0+2	1	3+1	2
	MF	(England) ENG	Steve McMahon	36	10	23+0	6	4+0	1	5+0	3	4+0	0
	MF	(Denmark) DEN	Jan Mølby	58	21	39+0	14	8+0	3	5+0	2	5+1	2
	DF	(England) ENG	Phil Neal	16	1	11+2	1	0+0	0	2+0	0	1+0	0
	MF	(Scotland) SCO	Steve Nicol	47	4	33+1	4	4+0	0	3+0	0	6+0	0
	FW	(Wales) WAL	Ian Rush	56	33	40+0	22	8+0	6	6+0	3	2+0	2
	DF	(England) ENG	Mark Seagraves	2	0	0+0	0	1+0	0	1+0	0	0+0	0
	FW	(England) ENG	Paul Walsh	32	18	17+3	11	2+0	1	4+0	4	6+0	2
	MF	(Scotland) SCO	John Wark	18	6	7+2	3	2+2	2	2+1	1	0+2	0
	MF	(Republic of Ireland) IRL	Ronnie Whelan	57	14	39+0	10	7+0	1	7+0	3	4+0	0

== League table ==
Pos	Team	Pld	W	D	L	GF	GA	GD	Pts	Qualification or relegation
1	Liverpool (C)	42	26	10	6	89	37	+52	88	Disqualified from the European Cup
2	Everton (Note: Since the FA Cup winners, Liverpool, would have instead qualified for the European Cup, qualification would have instead been passed down to runners-up Everton.)	42	26	8	8	87	41	+46	86	Disqualified from the European Cup Winners' Cup
3	West Ham United	42	26	6	10	74	40	+34	84	Disqualified from the UEFA Cup
4	Manchester United	42	22	10	10	70	36	+34	76	Disqualified from the UEFA Cup
5	Sheffield Wednesday (Note: Since Everton would have instead qualified for the European Cup Winners' Cup, UEFA Cup qualification would have been passed down to Sheffield Wednesday.)	42	21	10	11	63	54	+9	73	Disqualified from the UEFA Cup

Source: World Football
Rules for classification: 1) Points; 2) Goal difference; 3) Goals scored
(C) Champions

== Results ==
=== First Division ===
Date	Opponents	Venue	Result	Scorers	Attendance	Report 1	Report 2
17-Aug-85	Arsenal	H	2–0	Whelan 33' Nicol 61'	38,261	Report	Report
21-Aug-85	Aston Villa	A	2–2	Rush 39' Mølby 85'	20,197	Report	Report
24-Aug-85	Newcastle United	A	0–1		29,670	Report	Report
26-Aug-85	Ipswich Town	H	5–0	Nicol 15' Rush 23', 67' Mølby 27' Johnston 90'	29,383	Report	Report
31-Aug-85	West Ham United	A	2–2	Johnston 52' Whelan 83'	19,762	Report	Report
03-Sep-85	Nottingham Forest	H	2–0	Whelan 55', 69'	27,135	Report	Report
07-Sep-85	Watford	H	3–1	Neal pen 27' Johnston 67' Rush 72'	31,395	Report	Report
14-Sep-85	Oxford United	A	2–2	Rush 62' Johnston 75'	11,474	Report	Report
21-Sep-85	Everton	A	3–2	Dalglish 1' Rush 16' McMahon 42'	51,509	Report	Report
28-Sep-85	Tottenham Hotspur	H	4–1	Lawrenson 44' Rush 56' Mølby pen 61', pen 67'	41,521	Report	Report
05-Oct-85	Queens Park Rangers	A	1–2	Walsh 9'	24,621	Report	Report
12-Oct-85	Southampton	H	1–0	McMahon 60'	31,070	Report	Report
19-Oct-85	Manchester United	A	1–1	Johnston 46'	54,492	Report	Report
26-Oct-85	Luton Town	H	3–2	Walsh 31', 35' Mølby 65'	31,488	Report	Report
02-Nov-85	Leicester City	H	1–0	Rush 84'	31,718	Report	Report
09-Nov-85	Coventry City	A	3–0	Beglin 5' Walsh 47' Rush 81'	16,947	Report	Report
16-Nov-85	West Bromwich Albion	H	4–1	Nicol 45' Mølby 62' Lawrenson 73' Walsh 87'	28,407	Report	Report
23-Nov-85	Birmingham City	A	2–0	Rush 10' Walsh 26'	15,062	Report	Report
30-Nov-85	Chelsea	H	1–1	Mølby pen 85'	38,482	Report	Report
07-Dec-85	Aston Villa	H	3–0	Mølby 2' Walsh 67' Johnston 81'	29,418	Report	Report
14-Dec-85	Arsenal	A	0–2		35,048	Report	Report
21-Dec-85	Newcastle United	H	1–1	Nicol 34'	30,746	Report	Report
26-Dec-85	Manchester City	A	0–1		35,584	Report	Report
28-Dec-85	Nottingham Forest	A	1–1	MacDonald 55'	27,141	Report	Report
01-Jan-86	Sheffield Wednesday	H	2–2	Rush 49' Walsh 76'	38,964	Report	Report
12-Jan-86	Watford	A	3–2	Walsh 44', 85' Rush 75'	16,967	Report	Report
18-Jan-86	West Ham United	H	3–1	Mølby pen 58' Rush 67' Walsh 70'	41,056	Report	Report
01-Feb-86	Ipswich Town	A	1–2	Whelan 36'	20,551	Report	Report
09-Feb-86	Manchester United	H	1–1	Wark 40'	35,004	Report	Report
22-Feb-86	Everton	H	0–2		45,445	Report	Report
02-Mar-86	Tottenham Hotspur	A	2–1	Mølby 66' Rush 90'	16,436	Report	Report
08-Mar-86	Queens Park Rangers	H	4–1	McMahon 19', 75' Rush 29' Wark 43'	26,219	Report	Report
15-Mar-86	Southampton	A	2–1	Wark 53' Rush 59'	19,784	Report	Report
22-Mar-86	Oxford United	H	6–0	Rush 1', 71' Lawrenson 18' Whelan 39' Mølby pen 51', 88'	37,861	Report	Report
29-Mar-86	Sheffield Wednesday	A	0–0		37,946	Report	Report
31-Mar-86	Manchester City	H	2–0	McMahon 32', 58'	43,316	Report	Report
12-Apr-86	Coventry City	H	5–0	Whelan 20', 26', 83' Mølby 46' Rush 78'	42,729	Report	Report
16-Apr-86	Luton Town	A	1–0	Johnston 17'	15,390	Report	Report
19-Apr-86	West Bromwich Albion	A	2–1	Dalglish 23' Rush 55'	22,010	Report	Report
26-Apr-86	Birmingham City	H	5–0	Rush 25' Gillespie 46', 58', pen 83' Mølby pen 49'	42,021	Report	Report
30-Apr-86	Leicester City	A	2–0	Rush 20' Whelan 28'	25,799	Report	Report
03-May-86	Chelsea	A	1–0	Dalglish 23'	43,900	Report	Report

=== FA Cup ===
Date	Opponents	Venue	Result	Scorers	Attendance	Report 1	Report 2
04-Jan-86	Norwich City	H	5–0	MacDonald 23' Walsh 33' McMahon 73' Whelan 78' Wark 81'	29,082	Report	Report
26-Jan-86	Chelsea	A	2–1	Rush 45' Lawrenson 47'	33,625	Report	Report
15-Feb-86	York City	A	1–1	Mølby pen 64'	12,443	Report	Report
18-Feb-86	York City	H	3–1 aet	Wark 19' Mølby 94' Dalglish 98'	29,362	Report	Report
11-Mar-86	Watford	H	0–0		36,775	Report	Report
17-Mar-86	Watford	A	2–1	Mølby pen 86' Rush 108'	28,097	Report	Report
05-Apr-86	Southampton	N	2–0	Rush 99', 104'	44,605	Report	Report

Final

10 May 1986
15:00 BST

Liverpool	3–1	Everton
Rush 56', 83'; Johnston 62'	Report; Report	Lineker 27'

Wembley Stadium, London
Attendance: 98,000
Referee: Alan Robinson (Hampshire)

Liverpool	Everton

GK	1	(Zimbabwe) Bruce Grobbelaar
CB	2	(Republic of Ireland) Mark Lawrenson
LB	3	(Republic of Ireland) Jim Beglin
RB	4	(Scotland) Steve Nicol
LM	5	(Republic of Ireland) Ronnie Whelan
CB	6	(Scotland) Alan Hansen (c)
SS	7	(Scotland) Kenny Dalglish
RM	8	(Australia) Craig Johnston
CF	9	(Wales) Ian Rush
CM	10	(Denmark) Jan Mølby
CM	11	(Scotland) Kevin MacDonald
Substitute:
MF	12	(England) Steve McMahon
Player/Manager:
(Scotland) Kenny Dalglish

GK	1	(England) Bobby Mimms
RB	2	(England) Gary Stevens	(substituted off) 72'
LB	3	(Wales) Pat Van Den Hauwe
CB	4	(Wales) Kevin Ratcliffe (c)
CB	5	(England) Derek Mountfield
CM	6	(England) Peter Reid
CM	7	(England) Trevor Steven
CF	8	(England) Gary Lineker
CF	9	(Scotland) Graeme Sharp
RM	10	(England) Paul Bracewell
LM	11	(Republic of Ireland) Kevin Sheedy
Substitute:
MF	12	(England) Adrian Heath	(substituted on) 72'
Manager:
(England) Howard Kendall

=== League Cup ===
Date	Opponents	Venue	Result	Scorers	Attendance	Report 1	Report 2
24-Sep-85	Oldham Athletic	H	3–0	McMahon 25', 76' Rush 33'	16,150	Report	Report
09-Oct-85	Oldham Athletic	A	5–2	Whelan 5', 48' Wark 25' Rush 65' MacDonald 72'	7,719	Report	Report
29-Oct-85	Brighton & Hove Albion	H	4–0	Walsh 11', 71', 72' Dalglish 80'	15,291	Report	Report
26-Nov-85	Manchester United	H	2–1	Mølby 57', pen 58'	41,291	Report	Report
21-Jan-86	Ipswich Town	H	3–0	Walsh 17' Whelan 28' Rush 66'	19,762	Report	Report
12-Feb-86	Queens Park Rangers	A	0–1		15,051	Report	Report
05-Mar-86	Queens Park Rangers	H	2–2	McMahon 42' Johnston 69'	23,863	Report	Report

=== Super Cup ===
Date	Opponents	Venue	Result	Scorers	Attendance	Report 1	Report 2
17-Sep-85	Southampton	H	2–1	Mølby 6' Dalglish 28'	16,189	Report	Report
22-Oct-85	Southampton	A	1–1	Walsh 81'	10,503	Report	Report
03-Dec-85	Tottenham Hotspur	H	2–0	MacDonald 19' Walsh 34'	14,855	Report	Report
14-Jan-86	Tottenham Hotspur	A	3–0	Rush 49', 61' Lawrenson 56'	10,078	Report	Report
05-Feb-86	Norwich City	A	1–1	Dalglish 79'	15,330	Report	Report
06-May-86	Norwich City	H	3–1	MacDonald 56' Mølby pen 72' Johnston 79'	26,696	Report	Report
