= 1987–88 Liverpool F.C. season =

English football club season

Liverpool
1987–88 season
- Chairman: John Smith
- Manager: Kenny Dalglish
- First Division: Champions
- FA Cup: Runners-up
- League Cup: Third round
- Top goalscorer: League: John Aldridge (26); All: John Aldridge (29)
- Highest home attendance: 44,798 (vs. Tottenham, League, 23 Apr)
- Lowest home attendance: 29,994 (vs. Blackburn Rovers, League Cup, 6 Oct)
- Average home league attendance: 42,267
Home colours	Away colours

The 1987–88 season was the 96th season in Liverpool F.C.'s existence, their 26th consecutive year in the top-flight, and covered the period from 1 July 1987 to 30 June 1988.

The squad had altered significantly from the previous season, with star striker Ian Rush now at Juventus and player-manager Kenny Dalglish concentrating largely on the manager's job, though he was still registered as a player. In Rush's place was John Aldridge, signed halfway through the previous season from Oxford United, complemented up front by £1.9 million national record signing Peter Beardsley. Following Aldridge to Anfield from Oxford was winger Ray Houghton.

Liverpool enjoyed a record 29-match unbeaten start to the season and finished as champions with just two defeats from 40 league games and a nine-point gap between them and runners-up Manchester United, sealing the top division title for a record 17th time. They were widely expected to secure a unique second double, but surprisingly lost 1–0 to underdogs Wimbledon in the FA Cup final, in which their top scorer John Aldridge missed a penalty.

== Regular season ==
Following the departure of Ian Rush to Juventus of Italy in the summer, and the decision of player-manager Kenny Dalglish to only occasionally select himself for the first team, Liverpool had a new look attack for the 1987–88 season. Filling Rush's boots was John Aldridge, who had actually joined the club halfway through the previous season when Rush was still at Anfield. Alongside him was Peter Beardsley, the England forward signed from Newcastle United over the summer for a national record fee of £1.9 million. Another new signing was fellow England international John Barnes, the Watford winger, for £900,000.

Liverpool began the season on a winning note, beating Arsenal – who had beaten them in the previous season's League Cup final and were also among the pre-season title favourites – 2–1 at Highbury. The next league action came two weeks later at the end of August, when Steve Nicol scored twice and John Aldridge and Peter Beardsley scored the other goals in a 4–1 win at FA Cup holders Coventry City.

By the end of September, any observers who doubted John Aldridge's suitability as successor to Ian Rush were silenced as he had now scored in all of the club's opening seven league games, capped by a hat-trick in the 4–0 home win over Derby County. Liverpool were second in the table, but had two games in hand over surprise leaders Queen's Park Rangers, who had a three-point lead.

Aldridge managed to score in nine successive games for Liverpool from the start of the season, bringing his league tally to 11 goals by the time of their 4–0 win over Queen's Park Rangers at Anfield on 17 October 1987, which put the Reds back on top of the First Division on goal difference, but still with a two-game advantage over the West Londoners.

November began with the Merseyside derby at Anfield, in which Liverpool ran out 2–0 winners with goals from Steve McMahon and Peter Beardsley. Three successive draws followed, which saw Arsenal edge ahead of the Reds to the top of the table.

Liverpool's League Cup challenge came to an end in the third round when they lost 1–0 to Everton at Anfield.

Back in the league, Liverpool had returned to their winning ways and back to the top of the First Division table by the end of November, as they were now five points ahead of their nearest rivals Arsenal and had a game in hand.

Aldridge reached the 10-goal point in the league on 6 December with a penalty in the 2–1 home win over Chelsea. After a 2–2 draw at Southampton in the next game, came a six-match winning run which put the Reds 17 points ahead of their nearest challengers Nottingham Forest by 23 January 1988.

The FA Cup quest started at the Victoria Ground in early January, with the Reds being held to a disappointing goalless draw by Second Division underdogs Stoke City. A Peter Beardsley goal won the replay 1–0 at Anfield, and the next round saw the Reds cruise to a 2–0 win at Aston Villa. The fifth round brought another Merseyside derby, and the Reds took revenge for the League Cup exit by winning 1–0 at Goodison Park with a Ray Houghton goal.

Liverpool's record unbeaten start to the league season finally ended on 20 March, when they lost 1–0 at Everton in their 30th game. They still had a 14-point lead and two games in hand over nearest rivals Manchester United, however.

The wait for the league title was prolonged by a dramatic clash with Manchester United at Anfield on 4 April. After a Steve McMahon goal had put them 3–1 up in the 46th minute, a late surge by United saw the game end 3–3, but Liverpool were still 11 points ahead of Alex Ferguson's men, and had seven games left to play whereas United only had five. Even if United won all of their remaining games, Liverpool (with a vastly superior goal difference) only needed four points from their final seven games to seal the title. A goalless draw at Norwich City on 20 April effectively confirmed Liverpool as champions; they only needed heavy defeats from their final four games and United four comprehensive victories from theirs for the title to slip out of Liverpool's grasp. Three days later, Liverpool confirmed their 17th title triumph with a Peter Beardsley goal giving them a 1–0 win over Tottenham Hotspur at Anfield.

With the exception of a 5–1 win at Sheffield Wednesday in the penultimate game of the season, in which Craig Johnston scored his final two goals for Liverpool, their remaining league games of the season all ended in 1–1 draws and they finished the season with just two league defeats from 40 games and a nine-point lead over runners-up Manchester United.

Liverpool were also on a run in the FA Cup. The quarter-final had seen them triumph 4–0 over Manchester City at Maine Road, and in the semi-finals two John Aldridge goals had given them a 2–1 win over Nottingham Forest to reach the final, where they would take on Wimbledon.

Their opponents, managed by Bobby Gould and containing the likes of bullish striker John Fashanu and hard tackling midfielder Vinnie Jones, were in only their second season as a First Division club and their 11th as Football League members. The Reds were overwhelming favourites to win the final and become the first team to do the double twice. But after Peter Beardsley put the ball past goalkeeper Dave Beasant and had his goal disallowed by the referee who had already awarded a free kick to Liverpool, Wimbledon took a 37th-minute lead with a goal from midfielder Lawrie Sanchez, a glancing header into the right of the net from a free-kick. Liverpool were far from ready to admit defeat. On the hour, Liverpool were awarded a penalty and John Aldridge took it, only for his shot to be saved by Beasant diving to his left – the first penalty miss in an FA Cup final at Wembley. Liverpool continued to put pressure on the Londoners but could not find a way past Beasant, and when the final whistle blew Wimbledon had won the trophy in one of the biggest FA Cup upsets of all time.

== Squad ==
Goalkeepers

- (South Africa) Bruce Grobbelaar
- (England) Mike Hooper

Defenders

- (England) Gary Ablett
- (Scotland) Gary Gillespie
- (Scotland) Alan Hansen
- (England) Mark Lawrenson
- (Scotland) Steve Nicol
- (Republic of Ireland) Steve Staunton
- (England) Barry Venison
- (England) Alex Watson

Midfielders

- (England) John Barnes
- (Scotland) Kenny Dalglish
- (Scotland) Ray Houghton
- (South Africa) Craig Johnston
- (Scotland) Kevin MacDonald
- (England) Steve McMahon
- (England) Mike Marsh
- (Denmark) Jan Mølby
- (England) Mark Seagraves
- (England) Nigel Spackman
- (Scotland) John Wark
- (Republic of Ireland) Ronnie Whelan

Attackers

- (Republic of Ireland) John Aldridge
- (England) Peter Beardsley
- (England) John Durnin
- (Scotland) Alan Irvine
- (England) Paul Walsh

Note that in line with Wikipedia policy the flags used on this article represent sporting nationality rather than actual.

== Squad statistics ==
=== Appearances and goals ===
No.	Pos	Nat	Player	Total		Division 1		FA Cup		League Cup	
No.	Pos	Nat	Player	Apps	Goals	Apps	Goals	Apps	Goals	Apps	Goals
	GK	(South Africa) RSA	Bruce Grobbelaar	46	0	38+0	0	5+0	0	3+0	0
	DF	(Scotland) SCO	Steve Nicol	50	7	40+0	6	7+0	0	3+0	1
	DF	(Scotland) SCO	Gary Gillespie	42	4	35+0	4	5+0	0	2+0	0
	DF	(Scotland) SCO	Alan Hansen	49	1	39+0	1	7+0	0	3+0	0
	DF	(England) ENG	Gary Ablett	22	0	15+2	0	5+0	0	0+0	0
	MF	(Republic of Ireland) IRL	Ray Houghton	35	7	26+2	5	7+0	2	0+0	0
	MF	(Republic of Ireland) IRL	Ronnie Whelan	33	1	26+2	1	2+0	0	3+0	0
	MF	(England) ENG	Steve McMahon	49	9	40+0	9	7+0	0	2+0	0
	MF	(England) ENG	John Barnes	48	17	38+0	15	7+0	2	3+0	0
	FW	(Republic of Ireland) IRL	John Aldridge	45	29	36+0	26	6+0	2	3+0	1
	FW	(England) ENG	Peter Beardsley	48	18	36+2	15	7+0	3	3+0	0
	GK	(England) ENG	Mike Hooper	4	0	2+0	0	2+0	0	0+0	0
	MF	(England) ENG	Nigel Spackman	33	0	19+8	0	5+0	0	1+0	0
	MF	(South Africa) RSA	Craig Johnston	35	6	18+12	5	1+2	1	2+0	0
	DF	(England) ENG	Barry Venison	22	0	18+0	0	2+0	0	2+0	0
	DF	(Republic of Ireland) IRL	Mark Lawrenson	19	0	10+4	0	2+0	0	2+1	0
	DF	(England) ENG	Alex Watson	2	0	2+0	0	0+0	0	0+0	0
	FW	(England) ENG	Paul Walsh	9	0	1+7	0	0+0	0	0+1	0
	MF	(Denmark) DEN	Jan Mølby	8	0	1+6	0	0+1	0	0+0	0
	FW	(Scotland) SCO	Kenny Dalglish	2	0	0+2	0	0+0	0	0+0	0
	MF	(Scotland) SCO	Kevin MacDonald	1	0	0+1	0	0+0	0	0+0	0
	MF	(Scotland) SCO	John Wark	2	0	0+1	0	0+0	0	1+0	0

== Transfers ==
=== In ===
Pos	Player	From	Fee	Date
MF	(England) John Barnes	(England) Watford	£900,000	12 June 1987
FW	(England) Peter Beardsley	(England) Newcastle United	£1,900,000	14 July 1987
MF	(England) Mike Marsh	(England) Kirkby Town	Free	21 August 1987
MF	(Republic of Ireland) Ray Houghton	(England) Oxford United	£825,000	19 October 1987

=== Out ===
Pos	Player	To	Fee	Date
DF	(Scotland) John McGregor	(Scotland) Rangers	£70,000	June 1987
FW	(Wales) Ian Rush	(Italy) Juventus	£3,200,000	1 July 1987
FW	(Scotland) Alan Irvine	(Scotland) Dundee United	£100,000	28 August 1987
DF	(Republic of Ireland) Ken De Mange	(England) Leeds United	£65,000	September 1987
MF	(England) Mark Seagraves	(England) Manchester City	£100,000	25 September 1987
DF	(England) Brian Mooney	(England) Preston North End	£82,000	9 October 1987
MF	(Scotland) John Wark	(England) Ipswich Town	£100,000	4 January 1988
FW	(England) Paul Walsh	(England) Tottenham Hotspur	£500,000	16 February 1988
DF	(Republic of Ireland) Mark Lawrenson	N/A	retired	March 1988
MF	(Australia) Craig Johnston	N/A	retired	May 1988

== League table ==
Pos	Team	Pld	W	D	L	GF	GA	GD	Pts	Qualification or relegation
1	Liverpool (C)	40	26	12	2	87	24	+63	90	Qualified for the Football League Centenary Trophy and disqualified from the European Cup
2	Manchester United	40	23	12	5	71	38	+33	81	Qualified for the Football League Centenary Trophy and disqualified from UEFA Cup
3	Nottingham Forest	40	20	13	7	67	39	+28	73	Qualified for the Football League Centenary Trophy
4	Everton	40	19	13	8	53	27	+26	70	Qualified for the Football League Centenary Trophy
5	Queens Park Rangers	40	19	10	11	48	38	+10	67	Qualified for the Football League Centenary Trophy

Source: World Football
Rules for classification: 1) Points; 2) Goal difference; 3) Goals scored
(C) Champions

== Pre-season and friendlies ==
23 July 1987	Bayern Munich	3–2	Liverpool	Munich
	Matthäus; Hoeneß; Wegmann	Report	Aldridge 71'; Barnes 83'	Stadium: Olympiastadion; Attendance: 25,000
Note: Testimonial for: Dieter Hoeneß

26 July 1987	Aalborg Chang	0–4	Liverpool	Aalborg
		Report	Aldridge 8', 37' (pen.); Whelan 45'; Barnes	Stadium: Aalborg Stadium; Attendance: 4,100

28 July 1987	Brønshøj	1–1	Liverpool	Ringsted
	Vo Nielsen 22'	Report	Nicol 50'	Stadium: Ringsted Stadion; Attendance: 3,485

1 August 1987	Vejle	0–3	Liverpool	Spjald
		Report	Johnston 22'; Aldridge 28'; Beardsley 29'	Stadium: Spjald Stadion; Attendance: 3,000

3 August 1987	Karlstad	0–3	Liverpool	Karlstad
		Report	Beardsley; Aldridge (pen.); Walsh	Stadium: Tingvalla IP; Attendance: 5,567; Referee: Helen B

6 August 1987	Vålerenga	1–4	Liverpool	Oslo
	Fredheim	Report	Aldridge (pen.); Walsh	Stadium: Bislett Stadium; Attendance: 7,275

9 August 1987	Celtic	0–1	Liverpool	Glasgow
		Report	Whelan 38'	Stadium: Parkhead Stadium; Attendance: 42,000; Referee: Hope K
Note: Testimonial for: Tommy Burns

19 August 1987	Irish Olympic XI	0–5	Liverpool	Dublin
		Report	Whelan 25'; Aldridge 28' (pen.); Beardsley 44'; Walsh 58', 80'	Stadium: Lansdowne Road; Attendance: 12,000; Referee: Kelly P

23 August 1987	Athletico Madrid	0–1	Liverpool	Madrid
		Report	Wark 73'	Stadium: Vicente Calderón Stadium; Attendance: 25,000
Note: Villa de Madrid Trophy

19 October 1987	Dundee	0–4	Liverpool	Dundee
		Report	Barnes 27', 90'; Houghton 61'; Whelan 89'	Stadium: Dens Park; Attendance: 14,463; Referee: Muirhead T
Note: Testimonial for: George McGeachie

1 March 1988	Osasuna	0–2	Liverpool	Pamplona
		Report	Dalglish; Houghton	Stadium: El Sadar Stadium; Attendance: 12,000
Note: Testimonial for: Sammy Lee

16 May 1988	Liverpool	3–2	England XI	Liverpool
	Rush; Whelan	Report	Harford; Waddle	Stadium: Anfield; Attendance: 31,552; Referee: Trussell C
Note: Testimonial for: Alan Hansen

== Competitions ==
=== First Division ===
15 August 1987 1	Arsenal	1–2	Liverpool	London
15:00 BST	Davis 17'	Report	Aldridge 9'; Nicol 88'	Stadium: Highbury; Attendance: 54,703; Referee: Milford RG

29 August 1987 2	Coventry City	1–4	Liverpool	Coventry
15:00 BST	Regis 89'	Report	Nicol 20', 49'; Aldridge 52' (pen.); Beardsley 83'	Stadium: Highfield Road; Attendance: 27,637; Referee: Cooper K

5 September 1987 3	West Ham United	1–1	Liverpool	London
15:00 BST	Cottee 74'	Report	Aldridge 50' (pen.)	Stadium: Boleyn Ground; Attendance: 29,865; Referee: Gunn A

12 September 1987 4	Liverpool	2–0	Oxford United	Liverpool
15:00 BST	Aldridge 13'; Barnes 37'	Report		Stadium: Anfield; Attendance: 42,266; Referee: Stevens BT

15 September 1987 5	Liverpool	3–2	Charlton Athletic	Liverpool
15:00 BST	Aldridge 9' (pen.); Hansen 71'; McMahon 73'	Report	Crooks 8'; Walsh 59'	Stadium: Anfield; Attendance: 36,637; Referee: Reed MD

20 September 1987 6	Newcastle United	1–4	Liverpool	Newcastle upon Tyne
15:05 BST	McDonald 60' (pen.)	Report	Nicol 20', 47', 70'; Aldridge 37'	Stadium: St James' Park; Attendance: 24,141; Referee: Hackett KS

29 September 1987 7	Liverpool	4–0	Derby County	Liverpool
19:30 BST	Aldridge 41' (pen.), 68' (pen.), 73'; Beardsley	Report		Stadium: Anfield; Attendance: 43,405; Referee: Tyson GM

3 October 1987 8	Liverpool	4–0	Portsmouth	Liverpool
15:00 BST	Beardsley 30'; McMahon 50'; Aldridge 52' (pen.); Whelan 71'	Report		Stadium: Anfield; Attendance: 44,366; Referee: Courtney G

17 October 1987 9	Liverpool	4–0	Queens Park Rangers	Liverpool
15:00 BST	Johnston 41'; Aldridge (pen.); Barnes 79', 85'	Report		Stadium: Anfield; Attendance: 43,735; Referee: Bridges R

24 October 1987 10	Luton Town	0–1	Liverpool	Luton
15:00 GMT		Report	Gillespie 71'	Stadium: Kenilworth Road; Attendance: 12,452; Referee: Seville A

1 November 1987 11	Liverpool	2–0	Everton	Liverpool
15:05 GMT	McMahon 35'; Beardsley 70'	Report		Stadium: Anfield; Attendance: 44,760; Referee: Hill B

4 November 1987 12	Wimbledon	1–1	Liverpool	Wimbledon
19:45 GMT	Fairweather 78'	Report	Houghton 62'	Stadium: Plough Lane; Attendance: 13,544; Referee: Shapter LC

15 November 1987 13	Manchester United	1–1	Liverpool	Manchester
14:35 GMT	Whiteside 49'	Report	Aldridge 21'	Stadium: Old Trafford; Attendance: 47,106; Referee: Scott D

21 November 1987 14	Liverpool	0–0	Norwich City	Liverpool
15:00 GMT		Report		Stadium: Anfield; Attendance: 37,446; Referee: Deakin J

24 November 1987 15	Liverpool	4–0	Watford	Liverpool
19:30 GMT	McMahon 54'; Houghton 64'; Aldridge 68'; Barnes 71'	Report		Stadium: Anfield; Attendance: 32,396; Referee: Peck MG

28 November 1987 16	Tottenham Hotspur	0–2	Liverpool	London
15:00 GMT	Hodge (red card) 18'	Report	McMahon 63'; Johnston 80'	Stadium: White Hart Lane; Attendance: 47,362; Referee: Borrett IJ

6 December 1987 17	Liverpool	2–1	Chelsea	Liverpool
14:35 GMT	Aldridge 67' (pen.); McMahon 87'	Report	Durie 22' (pen.)	Stadium: Anfield; Attendance: 31,211; Referee: Courtney G

12 December 1987 18	Southampton	2–2	Liverpool	Southampton
15:00 GMT	Clarke 43'; Townsend 71'	Report	Barnes 11', 38'	Stadium: The Dell; Attendance: 19,507; Referee: King HW

19 December 1987 19	Liverpool	1–0	Sheffield Wednesday	Liverpool
15:00 GMT	Gillespie 76'	Report		Stadium: Anfield; Attendance: 35,383; Referee: Watson JL

26 December 1987 20	Oxford United	0–3	Liverpool	Oxford
15:00 GMT		Report	Aldridge 42'; Barnes 54'; McMahon 61'	Stadium: Manor Ground; Attendance: 13,680; Referee: Ashby GR

28 December 1987 21	Liverpool	4–0	Newcastle United	Liverpool
15:00 GMT	McMahon 4'; Aldridge 48' (pen.), 76'; Houghton 88'	Report		Stadium: Anfield; Attendance: 44,637; Referee: Key JM

1 January 1988 22	Liverpool	4–0	Coventry City	Liverpool
15:00 GMT	Beardsley 22', 83'; Aldridge 53'; Houghton 75'	Report		Stadium: Anfield; Attendance: 38,790; Referee: Phillips D

16 January 1988 23	Liverpool	2–0	Arsenal	Liverpool
15:00 GMT	Aldridge 44'; Beardsley 61'	Report		Stadium: Anfield; Attendance: 44,294; Referee: Barratt KP

23 January 1988 24	Charlton Athletic	0–2	Liverpool	London
15:00 GMT		Report	Beardsley 30'; Barnes 60'	Stadium: Selhurst Park; Attendance: 28,095; Referee: Tyson GM

6 February 1988 25	Liverpool	0–0	West Ham United	Liverpool
15:00 GMT		Report		Stadium: Anfield; Attendance: 42,049; Referee: McAuley J

13 February 1988 26	Watford	1–4	Liverpool	Watford
15:00 GMT	Luther Blissett	Report	Beardsley 29', 49'; Aldridge 47'; Barnes 60'	Stadium: Vicarage Road; Attendance: 23,838; Referee: Cooper K

27 February 1988 27	Portsmouth	0–2	Liverpool	Portsmouth
15:00 GMT		Report	Barnes 49', 85'	Stadium: Fratton Park; Attendance: 28,117; Referee: Lewis RS

5 March 1988 28	Queens Park Rangers	0–1	Liverpool	London
15:00 GMT		Report	Barnes 34'	Stadium: Loftus Road; Attendance: 23,171; Referee: Martin JE

16 March 1988 29	Derby County	1–1	Liverpool	Derby
19:30 GMT	Forsyth 85'	Report	Johnston 54'	Stadium: Baseball Ground; Attendance: 26,356; Referee: Ward AW

20 March 1988 30	Everton	1–0	Liverpool	Liverpool
14:35 GMT	Clarke 14'	Report		Stadium: Goodison Park; Attendance: 44,162; Referee: Dilkes R

26 March 1988 31	Liverpool	2–1	Wimbledon	Liverpool
14:35 GMT	Aldridge 34'; Barnes 78'	Report	Young 89'	Stadium: Anfield; Attendance: 36,464; Referee: Courtney G

2 April 1988 32	Nottingham Forest	2–1	Liverpool	Nottingham
15:00 BST	Hansen 24' (o.g.); Webb 59'; Clough (penalty missed) 71'	Report	Aldridge 70' (pen.)	Stadium: City Ground; Attendance: 29,188; Referee: Barratt KP

4 April 1988 33	Liverpool	3–3	Manchester United	Liverpool
15:00 BST	Beardsley 38'; Gillespie 41'; McMahon 46'	Report	Robson 3', 66'; Gibson (red card) 60'; Strachan 77'	Stadium: Anfield; Attendance: 43,497; Referee: Key JM

13 April 1988 34	Liverpool	5–0	Nottingham Forest	Liverpool
15:00 BST	Houghton 18'; Aldridge 37', 88'; Gillespie 58'; Beardsley 79'	Report		Stadium: Anfield; Attendance: 39,535; Referee: Barratt KP

20 April 1988 35	Norwich City	0–0	Liverpool	Norwich
19:45 BST		Report		Stadium: Carrow Road; Attendance: 22,509; Referee: Hart RA

23 April 1988 36	Liverpool	1–0	Tottenham Hotspur	Liverpool
15:00 BST	Beardsley 34'	Report		Stadium: Anfield; Attendance: 44,798; Referee: Aplin G

30 April 1988 37	Chelsea	1–1	Liverpool	London
15:00 BST	Durie 71' (pen.)	Report	Barnes 75'; Beardsley (penalty missed) 87'	Stadium: Stamford Bridge; Attendance: 35,625; Referee: Hamer RL

2 May 1988 38	Liverpool	1–1	Southampton	Liverpool
15:00 BST	Aldridge 41'	Report	Wallace 68'	Stadium: Anfield; Attendance: 37,610; Referee: Redfern KA

7 May 1988 39	Sheffield Wednesday	1–5	Liverpool	Sheffield
15:00 BST	Hirst 86'	Report	Johnston 31', 90'; Barnes 36'; Beardsley 82', 83'	Stadium: Hillsborough Stadium; Attendance: 35,893; Referee: Shaw D

9 May 1988 40	Liverpool	1–1	Luton Town	Liverpool
19:30 BST	Aldridge 17'	Report	Oldfield 30'	Stadium: Anfield; Attendance: 30,374; Referee: Phillips D

=== FA Cup ===
9 January 1988 3	Stoke City	0–0	Liverpool	Stoke-on-Trent
15:00 GMT		Report		Stadium: Victoria Ground; Attendance: 31,979; Referee: Mills T

12 January 1988 3	Liverpool	1–0	Stoke City	Liverpool
19:30 GMT	Beardsley 9'	Report		Stadium: Anfield; Attendance: 39,147; Referee: Mills T

31 January 1988 4	Aston Villa	0–2	Liverpool	Aston
14:35 GMT		Report	Barnes 53'; Beardsley 86'	Stadium: Villa Park; Attendance: 46,324; Referee: Hackett KS

21 February 1988 5	Everton	0–1	Liverpool	Liverpool
15:05 GMT		Report	Houghton 76'	Stadium: Goodison Park; Attendance: 48,270; Referee: Martin JE

13 March 1988 QF	Manchester City	0–4	Liverpool	Manchester
14:35 GMT		Report	Houghton 32'; Beardsley 53'; Johnston 77'; Barnes 85'	Stadium: Maine Road; Attendance: 44,047; Referee: Gunn A

9 April 1988 SF	Liverpool	2–1	Nottingham Forest	Sheffield
15:00 BST	Aldridge 14' (pen.), 51'	Report	Clough 67'	Stadium: Hillsborough Stadium; Attendance: 51,627; Referee: Courtney G

14 May 1988 F	Liverpool	0–1	Wimbledon	London
15:00 BST	Aldridge (penalty missed) 60'	Report	Sanchez 36'	Stadium: Wembley Stadium; Attendance: 98,203; Referee: Hill B

Final

14 May 1988
15:00 BST

Liverpool	0–1	Wimbledon
	Report; Report	Sanchez 37'

Wembley Stadium, London
Attendance: 98,203
Referee: Brian Hill

Liverpool	Wimbledon

GK	1	(Zimbabwe) Bruce Grobbelaar
RB	4	(Scotland) Steve Nicol
CB	2	(Scotland) Gary Gillespie
CB	6	(Scotland) Alan Hansen (c)
LB	3	(England) Gary Ablett
RM	9	(Republic of Ireland) Ray Houghton
CM	5	(England) Nigel Spackman	(substituted off) 74'
CM	11	(England) Steve McMahon
LM	10	(England) John Barnes
SS	7	(England) Peter Beardsley
CF	8	(Republic of Ireland) John Aldridge	(substituted off) 64'
Substitutes:
MF	12	(Australia) Craig Johnston	(substituted on) 64'
MF	14	(Denmark) Jan Mølby	(substituted on) 74'
Manager:
(Scotland) Kenny Dalglish

GK	1	(England) Dave Beasant (c)
RB	2	(England) Clive Goodyear
CB	5	(Wales) Eric Young
CB	6	(England) Andy Thorn
LB	3	(Republic of Ireland) Terry Phelan
CM	10	(Northern Ireland) Lawrie Sanchez
CM	4	(Wales) Vinnie Jones
RW	8	(England) Alan Cork	(substituted off) 56'
LW	11	(England) Dennis Wise
CF	7	(England) Terry Gibson	(substituted off) 63'
CF	9	(England) John Fashanu
Substitutes:
DF	12	(England) John Scales	(substituted on) 63'
FW	14	(England) Laurie Cunningham	(substituted on) 56'
Manager:
(England) Bobby Gould

Match rules

- 90 minutes
- 30 minutes of extra-time if necessary
- Replay if scores still level
- Two named substitutes
- Maximum of two substitutions

=== League Cup ===
23 September 1987 2	Blackburn Rovers	1–1	Liverpool	Blackburn
15:00 BST	Sellars 49'	Report	Nicol 30'	Stadium: Ewood Park; Attendance: 13,924; Referee: Midgley N

6 October 1987 2	Liverpool	1–0	Blackburn Rovers	Liverpool
19:30 BST	Aldridge 89'	Report		Stadium: Anfield; Attendance: 29,994; Referee: Worrall JB

28 October 1987 3	Liverpool	0–1	Everton	Liverpool
19:30 GMT		Report	Stevens 83'	Stadium: Anfield; Attendance: 44,071; Referee: Callow VG
