= 1982–83 Luton Town F.C. season =

English football club season

Luton Town
1982–83 season
- Chairman: David Evans
- Manager: David Pleat
- Stadium: Kenilworth Road
- Division One: 18th
- Milk Cup: Fourth round
- FA Cup: Fourth round
- Top goalscorer: League: Brian Stein and Paul Walsh (14); All: Brian Stein and Paul Walsh (15)
- Highest home attendance: 21,231 v Tottenham Hotspur, Division One, 15 January 1983
- Lowest home attendance: 6,409 v Blackpool, Milk Cup, 9 November 1982
- Average home league attendance: 13,452
- Biggest win: 5–0 v Brighton & Hove Albion (H), Division One, 18 September 1982
- Biggest defeat: 0–5 v Everton (A), Division One, 18 December 1982

The 1982–83 season was the 97th in the history of Luton Town Football Club. They retained their First Division status by winning at Manchester City in the final match of the season thanks to a dramatic late goal by Raddy Antić, which consigned their opponents to relegation instead.

== Squad ==
Players who made one appearance or more for Luton Town F.C. during the 1982-83 season

Pos.	Nat.	Name	League		Milk Cup		FA Cup		Total	
Pos.	Nat.	Name	Apps	Goals	Apps	Goals	Apps	Goals	Apps	Goals
GK	SCO	Jake Findlay	26	0	3	0	2	0	31	0
GK	ENG	Tony Godden (on loan from West Bromwich Albion)	12	0	0	0	0	0	12	0
GK	ENG	Alan Judge	4	0	1	0	0	0	5	0
DF	NIR	Mal Donaghy	40	3	4	0	2	0	46	3
DF	ENG	Paul Elliott	13	1	0	0	0	0	13	1
DF	ENG	Clive Goodyear	34(1)	2	4	0	2	0	40(1)	2
DF	ENG	Richard Money	31	0	4	0	1	0	36	0
DF	ENG	Kirk Stephens	40	0	3	0	2	0	45	0
DF	ENG	Mitchell Thomas	4	0	1	0	1	0	6	0
MF	YUG	Raddy Antić	11(13)	2	0(1)	0	0	0	11(14)	2
MF	ENG	Ray Daniel	1(2)	0	0	0	0	0	1(2)	0
MF	ENG	Lil Fuccillo	8(1)	0	2	2	0	0	10(1)	2
MF	ENG	Ricky Hill	42	9	3	0	2	1	47	10
MF	ENG	Brian Horton	40	4	4	0	2	1	46	5
MF	SCO	Billy Kellock	2(5)	0	1	2	0(1)	0	3(6)	2
MF	ENG	David Moss	39	9	4	1	1	0	44	10
MF	ENG	Garry Parker	1	0	0	0	0	0	1	0
MF	ENG	Wayne Turner	29(1)	1	2	0	2	0	33(1)	1
MF	ENG	Mark Watts	1	0	0	0	1	0	2	0
FW	ENG	Trevor Aylott	12	2	0	0	0	0	12	2
FW	ENG	Frankie Bunn	3(1)	0	0(1)	1	1	0	4(2)	1
FW	ENG	David Geddis (on loan from Aston Villa)	4	0	0	0	0	0	4	0
FW	ENG	Mike Small	0(1)	0	0	0	0	0	0(1)	0
FW	ENG	Brian Stein	20(1)	14	4	1	1	0	25(1)	15
FW	ENG	Paul Walsh	41	14	4	0	2	1	47	15
FW	ENG	Steve White (on loan from Charlton Athletic)	4	0	0	0	0	0	4	0

== League table ==
Pos	Team	Pld	W	D	L	GF	GA	GD	Pts	Qualification or relegation
16	Sunderland	42	12	14	16	48	61	−13	50	
17	Birmingham City	42	12	14	16	40	55	−15	50	
18	Luton Town	42	12	13	17	65	84	−19	49	
19	Coventry City	42	13	9	20	48	59	−11	48	
20	Manchester City (R)	42	13	8	21	47	70	−23	47	Relegation to the Second Division

Source: World Football
Rules for classification: 1) Points; 2) Goal difference; 3) Goals scored
(R) Relegated

== Results ==
=== First Division ===
28 August 1982 1	Tottenham Hotspur	2–2	Luton Town	London
	Mabbutt 3'; Hazard 19'		Lacy 37' (o.g.); Stein 53'	Stadium: White Hart Lane; Attendance: 35,195

31 August 1982 2	Luton Town	0–2	West Ham United	Luton
			Goddard 50'; Bonds 66'	Stadium: Kenilworth Road; Attendance: 13,403

4 September 1982 3	Luton Town	5–3	Notts County	Luton
	Walsh 16', 65', 67'; Hill 42'; Moss 50'		Kilcline 24'; Chiedozie 33'; Goodwin 68'	Stadium: Kenilworth Road; Attendance: 9,071

8 September 1982 4	Aston Villa	4–1	Luton Town	Birmingham
	Mortimer 8'; Withe 21'; Cowans 39' (pen.), 86' (pen.)		Moss 54' (pen.)	Stadium: Villa Park; Attendance: 18,823

11 September 1982 5	Liverpool	3–3	Luton Town	Liverpool
	Souness 32'; Rush 42'; Johnston 76'		Stein 27', 63'; Moss 51'	Stadium: Anfield; Attendance: 33,694

18 September 1982 6	Luton Town	5–0	Brighton & Hove Albion	Luton
	Stein 20', 77', 89'; Turner 50'; Moss 72'			Stadium: Kenilworth Road; Attendance: 11,342

25 September 1982 7	Stoke City	4–4	Luton Town	Stoke-on-Trent
	Berry 10', 22'; Bracewell 50'; O'Callaghan 83'		Walsh 20'; Stein 43', 58'; Donaghy 63'	Stadium: Victoria Ground; Attendance: 18,475

2 October 1982 8	Luton Town	1–1	Manchester United	Luton
	Hill 59'		Grimes 13'	Stadium: Kenilworth Road; Attendance: 17,009

9 October 1982 9	Birmingham City	2–3	Luton Town	Birmingham
	Langan 66' (pen.); Brazier 85'		Stein 60'; Walsh 62'; Moss 80'	Stadium: St Andrew's; Attendance: 13,772

16 October 1982 10	Luton Town	1–1	Ipswich Town	Luton
	Stein 59' (pen.)		Brazil 12'	Stadium: Kenilworth Road; Attendance: 13,378

23 October 1982 11	West Bromwich Albion	1–0	Luton Town	West Bromwich
	Whitehead 24'			Stadium: The Hawthorns; Attendance: 16,488

30 October 1982 12	Luton Town	0–2	Nottingham Forest	Luton
			Wallace 45'; Gunn 63'	Stadium: Kenilworth Road; Attendance: 12,648

6 November 1982 13	Luton Town	2–2	Arsenal	Luton
	Moss 63'; Walsh 68'		Rix 53'; Talbot 55'	Stadium: Kenilworth Road; Attendance: 16,597

13 November 1982 14	Sunderland	1–1	Luton Town	Sunderland
	Atkins 87'		Moss 76'	Stadium: Roker Park; Attendance: 14,238

20 November 1982 15	Coventry City	4–2	Luton Town	Coventry
	Dyson 58'; Whitton 63', 83'; Thompson 84'		Horton 64'; Stein 79'	Stadium: Highfield Road; Attendance: 9,670

27 November 1982 16	Luton Town	3–3	Southampton	Luton
	Hill 63'; Stein 69'; Goodyear 87'		Wallace 26'; Cassells 40'; Armstrong 84'	Stadium: Kenilworth Road; Attendance: 11,196

4 December 1982 17	Swansea City	2–0	Luton Town	Swansea
	Curtis 51'; Latchford 81'			Stadium: Vetch Field; Attendance: 9,556

11 December 1982 18	Luton Town	3–1	Manchester City	Luton
	Walsh 55'; Stein 70', 86'		Cross 66'	Stadium: Kenilworth Road; Attendance: 11,013

18 December 1982 19	Everton	5–0	Luton Town	Liverpool
	Bailey 14'; Sheedy 39'; Curran 71'; Heath 73', 84'			Stadium: Goodison Park; Attendance: 14,986

27 December 1982 20	Luton Town	1–0	Watford	Luton
	Goodyear 37'			Stadium: Kenilworth Road; Attendance: 21,145

28 December 1982 21	Norwich City	1–0	Luton Town	Norwich
	Channon 11'			Stadium: Carrow Road; Attendance: 20,415

1 January 1983 22	Luton Town	1–2	Coventry City	Luton
	Donaghy 60'		Whitton 10'; Melrose 15'	Stadium: Kenilworth Road; Attendance: 13,072

4 January 1983 23	West Ham United	2–3	Luton Town	London
	Cottee 19'; Clark 65'		Walsh 38', 73', 90'	Stadium: Upton Park; Attendance: 21,435

15 January 1983 24	Luton Town	1–1	Tottenham Hotspur	Luton
	O'Reilly 35' (o.g.)		Hoddle 72'	Stadium: Kenilworth Road; Attendance: 21,231

22 January 1983 25	Brighton & Hove Albion	2–4	Luton Town	Hove
	Ritchie 69'; Grealish 73'		Hill 5', 71'; Stevens 24' (o.g.); Case 74' (o.g.)	Stadium: Goldstone Ground; Attendance: 11,778

5 February 1983 26	Luton Town	1–3	Liverpool	Luton
	Stein 31'		Rush 32'; Kennedy 43'; Souness 79'	Stadium: Kenilworth Road; Attendance: 18,434

26 February 1983 27	Ipswich Town	3–0	Luton Town	Ipswich
	Brazil 3'; Wark 47'; Putney 56'			Stadium: Portman Road; Attendance: 18,632

5 March 1983 28	Luton Town	0–0	West Bromwich Albion	Luton
				Stadium: Kenilworth Road; Attendance: 10,852

12 March 1983 29	Nottingham Forest	0–1	Luton Town	West Bridgford
			Hill 13'	Stadium: City Ground; Attendance: 14,387

19 March 1983 30	Arsenal	4–1	Luton Town	London
	Woodcock 17', 24', 79'; Davis 42'		Moss 88'	Stadium: Highbury; Attendance: 23,987

26 March 1983 31	Luton Town	1–3	Sunderland	Luton
	Horton 26' (pen.)		Pickering 3', 58'; James 75'	Stadium: Kenilworth Road; Attendance: 11,221

2 April 1983 32	Luton Town	0–1	Norwich City	Luton
			Bennett 26'	Stadium: Kenilworth Road; Attendance: 11,211

4 April 1983 33	Watford	5–2	Luton Town	Watford
	Blissett 6', 48' (pen.); Jobson 42'; Barnes 49'; Callaghan 78'		Aylott 16'; Horton 29'	Stadium: Vicarage Road; Attendance: 20,120

9 April 1983 34	Luton Town	2–1	Aston Villa	Luton
	Aylott 30'; Moss 90'		Shaw 41'	Stadium: Kenilworth Road; Attendance: 10,924

12 April 1983 35	Luton Town	3–1	Birmingham City	Luton
	Hill 4', 42'; Horton 8' (pen.)		Hopkins 66'	Stadium: Kenilworth Road; Attendance: 12,868

16 April 1983 36	Notts County	1–1	Luton Town	Nottingham
	Chiedozie 50'		Donaghy 90'	Stadium: Meadow Lane; Attendance: 8,897

23 April 1983 37	Luton Town	3–1	Swansea City	Luton
	Walsh 55', 74', 86'		Latchford 85'	Stadium: Kenilworth Road; Attendance: 11,561

30 April 1983 38	Southampton	2–2	Luton Town	Southampton
	Wright 19'; Armstrong 28'		Elliott 5'; Antić 31'	Stadium: The Dell; Attendance: 18,367

2 May 1983 39	Luton Town	0–0	Stoke City	Luton
				Stadium: Kenilworth Road; Attendance: 11,877

7 May 1983 40	Luton Town	1–5	Everton	Luton
	Hill 5'		Johnson 40'; Sharp 42' (pen.), 72'; Sheedy 63', 85'	Stadium: Kenilworth Road; Attendance: 12,447

9 May 1983 41	Manchester United	3–0	Luton Town	Stretford
	McGrath 35', 37'; Stapleton 86'			Stadium: Old Trafford; Attendance: 34,213

14 May 1983 42	Manchester City	0–1	Luton Town	Manchester
			Antić 85'	Stadium: Maine Road; Attendance: 42,843

=== Milk Cup ===
5 October 1982 Second round first leg	Luton Town	3–0	Charlton Athletic	Luton
	Stein 23' (pen.); Fuccillo 44', 85'			Stadium: Kenilworth Road; Attendance: 7,030

26 October 1982 Second round second leg	Charlton Athletic	2–0	Luton Town	London
	Hales 3', 49' (pen.)			Stadium: The Valley; Attendance: 5,973

9 November 1982 Third round	Luton Town	4–2	Blackpool	Luton
	Kellock 40', 70'; Bunn 55'; Moss 68'		Bamber 39'; Pashley 78'	Stadium: Kenilworth Road; Attendance: 6,409

1 December 1982 Fourth round	Tottenham Hotspur	1–0	Luton Town	London
	Villa 64'			Stadium: White Hart Lane; Attendance: 27,461

=== FA Cup ===
8 January 1983 Third round	Luton Town	3–0	Peterborough United	Luton
	Horton 15' (pen.); Hill 44'; Walsh 78'			Stadium: Kenilworth Road; Attendance: 11,151

29 January 1983 Fourth round	Luton Town	0–2	Manchester United	Luton
			Moses 46'; Moran 89'	Stadium: Kenilworth Road; Attendance: 20,516
