= Paul Walsh =

English footballer (born 1962)

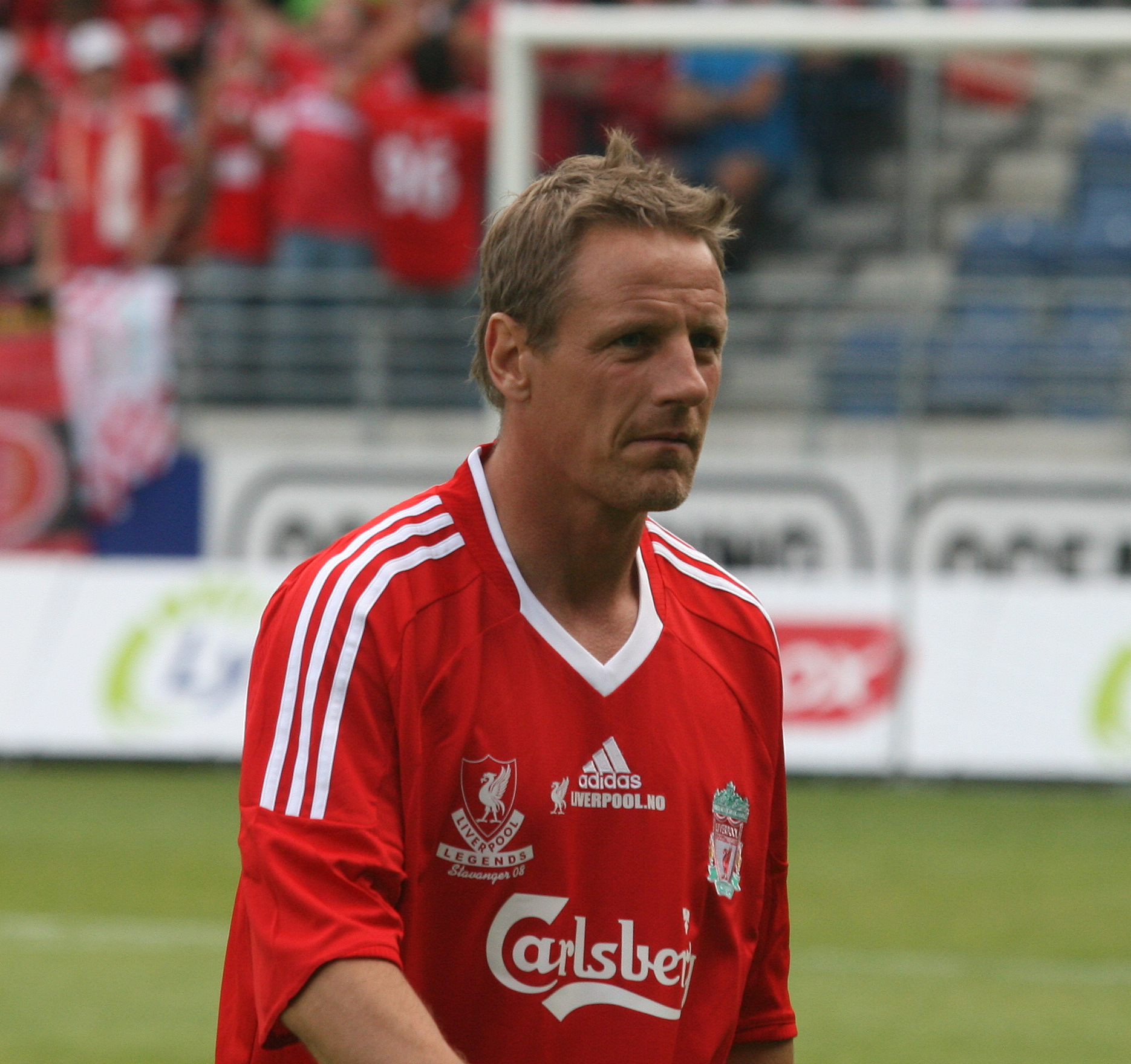
- Walsh in 2008

Personal information
- Full name: Paul Anthony Walsh
- Date of birth: 1 October 1962 (age 64)
- Place of birth: Plumstead, England
- Height: 5 ft 7 in (1.70 m)
- Position: Forward

Youth career
- 1976–1979: Charlton Athletic

Senior career*
Years	Team	Apps	(Gls)
1979–1982	Charlton Athletic	87	(24)
1982–1984	Luton Town	80	(25)
1984–1988	Liverpool	77	(25)
1988–1992	Tottenham Hotspur	128	(19)
1991	→ Queens Park Rangers (loan)	2	(0)
1992–1994	Portsmouth	73	(14)
1994–1995	Manchester City	53	(16)
1995–1996	Portsmouth	21	(5)
Total		521	(128)

International career
1979–1981	England Youth	10	(4)
1982–1984	England U21	7	(4)
1983–1984	England	5	(1)
- * Club domestic league appearances and goals

Paul Anthony Walsh (born 1 October 1962) is an English former professional footballer who now works as a television pundit.

A pacey and skilful forward, he scored a total of 127 goals in 521 league games in a 17-year career in the English Football League and Premier League; he also won five senior caps for England in an eleven-month international career beginning in June 1983. He began his career at Charlton Athletic, making his first team debut aged 16 in September 1979. He helped Charlton to win promotion out of the Third Division in 1980–81 and then won a place on the PFA Team of the Year in 1981–82. He moved from the Second Division into the First Division when Luton Town paid £400,000 to acquire his services in July 1982. He continued to impress and was named as PFA Young Player of the Year in 1984. He moved to Liverpool for a £700,000 fee in May 1984 and was named in the PFA Team of the Year in his second season for the club as Liverpool won the league title and the Football League Super Cup. He went on to struggle with injury at Anfield, though still managed to appear in losing finals of the 1984 FA Charity Shield, 1984 European Super Cup, 1985 European Cup, and 1987 Football League Cup, as well as help Liverpool to the league title and FA Cup double in 1985–86, and to finish as runners-up in the league in 1984–85 and 1986–87.

He was sold on to Tottenham Hotspur for a £500,000 fee in February 1988 and played for Spurs in their 1991 FA Cup Final victory over Nottingham Forest. However, he was frozen out of the first team after punching a coach (Ray Clemence) at the club, and after a brief loan spell at Queens Park Rangers was moved on to Portsmouth for a £400,000 fee in June 1992. A popular player at Fratton Park, supporters voted him Player of the Season in 1992–93, and he was named on the PFA Team of the Year in 1993–94. He returned to the top flight with Manchester City after signing for £750,000 in March 1994. He returned to Portsmouth for a £600,000 fee in September 1995 but was forced to retire due to cruciate ligament damage in February 1996. After retiring as a player, he became a football pundit and became a regular face on Sky Sports' Soccer Saturday. He was capped five times by England, scoring one goal.

== Club career ==
Paul Walsh was born to Don and June Walsh in Plumstead on 1 October 1962; his father was an electrician and his mother worked at Tate & Lyle. He grew up supporting Arsenal. However, his father was a season-ticket holder at West Ham United. Despite his natural skill, his small stature meant he was frequently overlooked in junior football. He was spotted playing for local youth side Londinium by Charlton Athletic scout Jim Fibbins and signed schoolboy forms aged 14. In a 1986 interview with Shoot magazine, Walsh cited Londinium manager John O'Connor as the biggest influence on his career. After leaving school he also began working part-time at a meat factory and later a fruit packing factory before he joined Charlton on a full-time basis.

=== Charlton Athletic ===
Walsh made his debut for the Reserves in September 1978, playing right midfield against Portsmouth at Fratton Park. He made his first team debut in the English Football League at 16 years old, coming on as a half-time substitute for Dick Tydeman in a Second Division fixture with Shrewsbury Town on 22 September 1979; he provided the assist for Martin Robinson's winning goal. Manager Andy Nelson handed him his first professional contract on his 17th birthday, a two-year contract paying £100 a week. However, Nelson was sacked the following March, and the "Addicks" were relegated into the Third Division at the end of the 1979–80 season.

Following the sale of Mike Flanagan to Crystal Palace, new manager Mike Bailey played Walsh in a strike partnership with Derek Hales in the 1980–81 campaign. Due to a League Cup draw, the season opened with three matches against Brentford, and Walsh scored his first senior goal at Griffin Park in a 3–1 defeat before scoring a hat-trick in the return fixture at The Valley, a 5–0 victory; this made him the youngest player to score a hat-trick in the club's history. He ended the campaign with 18 goals in all competitions, whilst Hales was named in the division's PFA Team of the Year. Charlton were at the top of the table for most of the season, but a loss of form from February cost them the title, though promotion was still secured with a third-place finish.

Bailey left Charlton to replace Alan Mullery as Brighton & Hove Albion manager, and the Charlton board ironically decided to name Mullery as Bailey's successor. Charlton finished the 1981–82 season in 13th place, and Walsh scored 15 goals in total. He performed well against divisional champions Luton Town, giving captain Mal Donaghy a difficult afternoon, which was enough to win him a move to his next club.

=== Luton Town ===
Walsh was signed by Luton Town manager David Pleat for £400,000 plus Steve White in July 1982. Pleat had an attacking philosophy that allowed Walsh to express himself and score goals. In only his second game for Luton at Kenilworth Road, he scored a hat-trick in a 5–3 win over Notts County, the second goal of which was voted Goal of the Season as he beat numerous defenders before chipping the goalkeeper. On the final day of the 1982–83 season Luton needed to beat Manchester City at Maine Road to remain in the First Division, and a late Radomir Antić volley secured the "Hatters" a 1–0 win and a place in the top-flight. After the game, Pleat celebrated by running down the touchline in a scene that became an iconic moment of 1980s football in England.

Luton enjoyed an excellent start to the 1983–84 season and were in third place on Boxing Day. On 10 December, Walsh scored a hat-trick in a 4–2 win over Stoke City at the Victoria Ground. However, a run of just three wins in 24 games saw Luton go from title contenders to relegation candidates, as well as exit the FA Cup in a 4–3 defeat to rivals Watford at Vicarage Road. Luton ended the campaign in 16th place, and Walsh was voted as PFA Young Player of the Year, ahead of candidates such as Ian Rush, Nigel Callaghan and John Barnes.

=== Liverpool ===
Liverpool manager Joe Fagan bought Walsh for a £700,000 fee in May 1984. Walsh turned down an approach from Italian Serie A side Como to join Liverpool. He joined Liverpool in time to travel with the players to Rome to see them win the 1984 European Cup Final. He made his debut as a substitute on 18 August 1984 in the 1–0 Charity Shield defeat to derby rivals Everton. With Ian Rush injured at the start of the 1984–85 season, Walsh partnered Kenny Dalglish up front, and he scored just 14 seconds into his Anfield debut on 27 August in a 3–0 win over West Ham United. However, he picked up a knee injury in October which caused him to miss six weeks and allowed Rush to re-establish himself as Dalglish's preferred strike partner. He scored 13 goals in 39 appearances in all competitions throughout the 1984–85 campaign, the most significant goal being the equaliser in the last minute of extra-time against rivals Manchester United in the FA Cup semi-finals at Goodison Park. However, Liverpool would lose the replay and also finished as runners-up in the league and European Cup. Walsh started the 1985 European Cup Final against Juventus at Heysel Stadium but had to come off early in the second half after aggravating a stomach injury; Liverpool lost the game 1–0, though the day would be remembered for the disaster which cost 39 lives.

Fagan's retirement in May 1985 and Dalglish's subsequent promotion to player-manager meant that instead of gradually succeeding Dalglish as Liverpool's main striker, Walsh had to contend with a rival for his position as the club's manager. He missed 1985–86 pre-season after undergoing a hernia operation. He returned to fitness against Oxford United on 14 September. He had a bitter argument with Dalglish at half-time, which initially seemed to spell the end of his Liverpool career as he was placed on the transfer list. He returned to the first team, though, and was taken off the transfer list by his own request and soon entered a scoring streak. However, his form was ended after he ruptured his ankle ligaments in a collision with Manchester United's Kevin Moran on 9 February. He returned to action six weeks later. Still, he continued to suffer from ankle trouble and was ruled out for the rest of the season, ending the campaign with 18 goals in 32 appearances in all competitions throughout the campaign. His injury caused him to miss the 1986 FA Cup Final, though he had played enough league games to secure a First Division winners medal as Liverpool won the league by a two-point margin over Everton. His contribution to the club's success was not forgotten as he was named in the First Division's PFA Team of the Year, alongside teammate Mark Lawrenson.

Writing in his 2015 autobiography, Walsh was highly critical of Liverpool's Boot Room culture, particularly then-medical staff Ronnie Moran and Roy Evans:

"I'd been having ultrasound for several months ... when a guy came in to test the equipment. After a simple procedure on the ultrasound machine, he informed us it wasn't even working! I'd been having treatment all that time and the fucking machine was broken."

—

He again missed pre-season in the summer of 1986, as he underwent an operation to correct his ankle injury. He recovered to earn a place on the bench for the second leg of the Football League Super Cup final victory over Everton on 30 September, but though he only entered the game as a late substitute he broke his hand after falling awkwardly. The day after the match, he had to drive himself to the hospital for an x-ray and to receive treatment. Having recovered from this injury, he went on to score a hat-trick in a 6–2 home win over Norwich City. He then went 12 games without a goal, and John Aldridge was signed to add competition to the forward roles. Walsh started at Wembley in the 2–1 League Cup final defeat to Arsenal, before being taken off for Dalglish after 73 minutes. Liverpool finished second in the league, nine points behind Everton, and Walsh scored only six goals in 32 appearances throughout the campaign.

The arrival of new forwards of Peter Beardsley, John Aldridge and John Barnes left Walsh only making occasional appearances in the 1987–88 campaign. He played just nine games without scoring a goal, though maintained fitness by playing games for the reserves. He began drinking heavily, later admitting "the only thing I was interested in by that point was getting pissed and enjoying myself".

=== Tottenham Hotspur ===
Walsh was signed by Tottenham Hotspur for £500,000 in February 1988, just after the appointment of Terry Venables as manager. He continued to drink heavily and admitted to being a "ring leader" of a drinking culture alongside Neil Ruddock, Terry Fenwick and David Howells which was to the detriment of the club's on-field progress. He ended the 1987–88 season with one goal in 11 games for Spurs. He later said he was "running at 70% capacity".

Walsh was partnered with new-signing Paul Stewart for the 1988–89 season, whilst fellow new arrival Paul Gascoigne boosted both the club's attacking potential and drinking culture. Spurs had a poor start to the season and were in a relegation battle during the first half of the season, and only Gascoigne and Chris Waddle were creating and scoring goals. Walsh felt that manager Terry Venables was too easy on the players and particularly too easy on Walsh himself who "needed someone on my case a bit more". He later described the season as "just a blur" as Spurs turned their campaign around to finish in sixth place despite Walsh scoring just six goals from 32 starts and five substitute appearances.

Venables brought Gary Lineker back from Barcelona, and Stewart was selected to be Lineker's striker partner for the 1989–90 season, leaving Walsh on the bench. An injury to Stewart gave Walsh a chance to win back his first-team place, and he marked his return to the first team with the winning goal in a 2–1 victory over rivals Arsenal, though failed to capitalise on this performance and again was dropped. Later in the season, he had to be taken off at half-time against Wimbledon as he had a long night of drinking with George Best the previous night. Spurs finished third in the league that season. He ended the campaign with three goals from 13 starts and 18 substitute appearances.

He was on the bench for the first nine games of the 1990–91 campaign, but in his first start scored a hat-trick in a 4–0 win over Sheffield United. However, Venables dropped him to the bench for the following game, and Walsh became "cynical and pissed off" as he felt nothing he could do could displace either Stewart and Lineker, though he ended the season with 20 starts and 19 substitute appearances. He did though make an appearance at Wembley in the 1991 FA Cup Final, coming on for Vinny Samways 82 minutes into a 2–1 victory over Nottingham Forest.

Walsh missed two weeks of the 1991–92 pre-season with a groin injury, and on his first game back for the reserves at White Hart Lane punched reserve team manager Ray Clemence in the face after Clemence substituted him off after an hour. Walsh was suspended for two weeks and upon his return was loaned out to Queens Park Rangers for a month. QPR manager Gerry Francis wanted to make the signing a permanent one, but the club were unable to afford the £800,000 fee Spurs had asked for. After returning to Spurs, he again punched someone in the face, this time a supporter who had shouted abuse to Walsh on the pitch after a game against Norwich City. He ended the campaign with three goals in 22 starts and 15 substitute appearances.

=== Portsmouth ===
Walsh was signed by Portsmouth for a £400,000 fee in June 1992, as manager Jim Smith prepared for a promotion challenge from the new Division One in the 1992–93 season. To tempt him out of the top-flight, "Pompey" manager Jim Smith offered him a four-year contract on a higher wage than he had been on at Spurs, whilst the club also bought his London home off him to facilitate his move to the south coast. In his autobiography, he admitted that he was not keen on joining Portsmouth but stated that he decided to take a much more professional approach to his career in terms of training and eating healthier food to start the 1992–93 pre-season in good physical condition; he credited his new approach to the birth of his first child. Ironically though, a virus picked up on a family holiday to Saint Lucia caused him to miss a month early in the season and drained him of fitness. He recovered to build a strike partnership with Guy Whittingham, whilst midfielders Alan McLoughlin and Mark Chamberlain made an effective four-pronged attack, and with two games to go Portsmouth were top of the table and needed only to beat relegation-threatened Sunderland to secure an automatic promotion place. However, they lost the match 4–1, and Walsh was sent off; he wrecked the Roker Park dressing rooms in a fit of temper. Portsmouth missed out on automatic promotion on goal difference, Walsh was suspended for the play-off games, and Portsmouth lost at the semi-final stage to Leicester City. Despite Whittingham scoring 47 league goals in all competitions, it was Walsh who the fans voted as their Player of the Year.

With Whittingham sold, Walsh failed to build an effective partnership with new signing Gerry Creaney, and Portsmouth failed to put together a promotion push for the 1993–94 season. However, Walsh scored both goals in a 2–2 draw with Manchester United at Old Trafford in the League Cup, putting himself back on the radar for top-flight clubs in need of strikers.

=== Manchester City ===
Manchester City manager Brian Horton, his former captain at Luton, paid Portsmouth £750,000 for Walsh's services in March 1994. With star striker Niall Quinn out injured, City were fourth from bottom with eleven Premier League games left to play and had also signed another new striker, Uwe Rosler – a German player who had yet to learn English. The pair soon built an understanding, however, and the arrival of wingers Peter Beagrie and Nicky Summerbee gave City the attacking firepower to steer clear of the relegation zone as Walsh and Rösler scored nine goals between them in the final ten games.

Horton tried to accommodate Niall Quinn, returning from a long-term injury, alongside Rösler and Walsh in the first team for the 1994–95 season, and as a result, had a very strong attacking team. City were in sixth place and pushing for European qualification for the first time since the 1970s by December, but then ten games without a win and three months without a goal for Walsh saw City fall down the table. They ended the campaign in 17th place and Horton was sacked. New manager Alan Ball tried to build a team around new signing Georgi Kinkladze for the 1995–96 campaign, and Walsh felt that the time had come to leave Maine Road.

=== Return to Portsmouth ===
Former Spurs teammate Terry Fenwick, now manager at Portsmouth, took Walsh back to Fratton Park in exchange for Gerry Creaney (valued at £600,000) in September 1995; Walsh signed a three-year contract with the club. He scored five goals in 21 league games in the 1995–96 season before suffering a micro-fracture of the fibula in a seemingly innocuous incident during a 1–1 draw with Millwall at The Den on 27 January. He played against Leicester City on 10 February, but his knee collapsed. The resulting cruciate ligament damage meant that he never played professional football again, although he did not announce his retirement until the following year. He became assistant first-team coach at the club upon his retirement. He had a testimonial game at Fratton Park in May 1998. He was a popular figure at the club, and in February 2005 he came second in the Football Focus poll to find the club's "cult hero", behind teammate Alan Knight.

== International career ==
Walsh was selected for the England youth team's summer trip to the Adria Cup at Yugoslavia in 1979. He was selected for the 1980 UEFA European Under-18 Championship in East Germany, which England won, though he made only two substitute appearances during the tournament. Soon after signing for Luton Town in 1982, he became a regular in the England under-21 side during the 1984 UEFA European Under-21 Championship. He played both legs against Greece, and scored the winning goal against Hungary to take England into the knock-out stages.

Walsh won his first senior England cap under Bobby Robson on 12 June 1983, in a 0–0 friendly draw with Australia at Sydney Cricket Ground during a two-week tour of the continent. Three days later he scored the only goal of the game against Australia in the second match of the tour at Brisbane's Lang Park. He then went on to secure his third cap within the space of seven days in a 1–1 draw with Australia at the Olympic Park Stadium. He earned a fourth cap playing alongside club-mate Brian Stein in a 2–0 defeat to France at Parc des Princes on 29 February 1984. The last of his five senior appearances for England came on 2 May 1984 in a 1–0 British Home Championship defeat to Wales at Wrexham's Racecourse Ground.

"If he can't motivate himself to play in a European Under-21 final, he's not for me."

— Bobby Robson was true to his word, and Walsh never played for England again after he turned down the opportunity to play in the final of the 1984 UEFA European Under-21 Championship in favour of going on an end-of-season tour with new club Liverpool.

== Style of play ==
In 1986, Bob Paisley described Walsh as an "individualist" best suited for a lone striker role due to his selfish play, tremendous pace and dribbling ability. He was able to shoot powerfully with both feet. He had an aggressive temperament, which led to occasional bookings and red cards for ill-discipline.

"Paul Walsh can play teams on his own some days. When he's buzzing and bubbling he whizzes around the field like a cartoon character with the ball tied to his boot. It's like watching a film that's running too fast. You want to slow it down in order to appreciate all the tricks he's getting up to. He might beat a defender on the outside, then turn back and go inside him and then beat him once again for luck."

— Bob Paisley on Walsh in the 1987 book Bob Paisley's personal view of the First Team Squad of 1986–87.

== Post-retirement ==
Walsh became a football agent for a short time and represented Lee Bradbury during his move to Manchester City. He also invested in property and other businesses, though he lost money by investing in Australian fraudster Peter Foster. Walsh began working in the media after retiring as a player and first began working as a pundit on Sky Sports in 2001, and since that time has appeared regularly on Soccer Saturday and Football First. In December 2007, he led a campaign against speeding fines in Hampshire.

== Personal life ==
He married Bev in 1990, and the couple had their first child, Jordan, on 12 January 1991. They had another son, Mason, on 22 November 1995, who turned professional at AFC Bournemouth in April 2014. Walsh published his autobiography, Wouldn't It Be Good, in 2015. His son, Mason, played for Bognor Regis Town.

== Career statistics ==
=== Club ===
Appearances and goals by club, season and competition
Club	Season	League			FA Cup		Other (Note: Appearances and goals in the League Cup, Football League Trophy, Football League play-offs and Full Members Cup)		Total	
Club	Season	Division	Apps	Goals	Apps	Goals	Apps	Goals	Apps	Goals
Charlton Athletic	1979–80	Second Division	9	0	0	0	0	0	9	0
Charlton Athletic	1980–81	Third Division	40	11	3	1	5	6	48	18
Charlton Athletic	1981–82	Second Division	38	13	1	0	4	0	42	13
Charlton Athletic	Total		87	24	4	1	9	6	100	31
Luton Town	1982–83	First Division	41	14	2	1	4	0	47	15
Luton Town	1983–84	First Division	39	11	2	2	1	1	42	14
Luton Town	Total		80	25	4	3	5	1	92	29
Liverpool	1984–85	First Division	26	8	3	2	9	3	38	13
Liverpool	1985–86	First Division	20	11	2	1	12	6	34	18
Liverpool	1986–87	First Division	23	6	3	0	5	0	31	6
Liverpool	1987–88	First Division	8	0	0	0	1	0	9	0
Liverpool	Total		77	25	8	3	27	9	112	37
Tottenham Hotspur	1987–88	First Division	11	1	0	0	0	0	11	1
Tottenham Hotspur	1988–89	First Division	33	6	1	0	3	0	37	6
Tottenham Hotspur	1989–90	First Division	26	2	1	0	4	1	31	3
Tottenham Hotspur	1990–91	First Division	29	7	4	0	6	0	39	7
Tottenham Hotspur	1991–92	First Division	29	3	2	0	7	1	38	4
Tottenham Hotspur	Total		128	19	8	0	20	2	156	21
Queens Park Rangers (loan)	1991–92	First Division	2	0	0	0	0	0	2	0
Portsmouth	1992–93	First Division	43	9	1	0	5	1	49	10
Portsmouth	1993–94	First Division	30	5	2	0	10	6	42	11
Portsmouth	Total		73	14	3	0	15	7	91	21
Manchester City	1993–94	Premier League	11	4	0	0	0	0	11	4
Manchester City	1994–95	Premier League	39	12	3	1	6	2	48	15
Manchester City	1995–96	Premier League	3	0	0	0	0	0	3	0
Manchester City	Total		53	16	3	1	6	2	62	19
Portsmouth	1995–96	First Division	21	5	1	0	0	0	22	5
Career total			521	128	31	8	82	27	634	163

=== International ===
Appearances and goals by national team and year
National team	Year	Apps	Goals
England	1983	3	1
England	1984	2	0
Total		5	1

== Honours ==
Charlton Athletic

- Football League Third Division third-place promotion: 1980–81

Liverpool

- Football League First Division: 1985–86
- Football League Super Cup: 1986
- Football League Cup runner-up: 1986–87
- European Cup runner-up: 1984–85

Tottenham Hotspur

- FA Cup: 1990–91
- FA Charity Shield: 1991 (shared)

England U18

- UEFA European Under-18 Championship: 1980

Individual

- PFA Team of the Year: 1981–82 Second Division, 1985–86 First Division, 1993–94 First Division
- PFA Young Player of the Year: 1983–84
- Portsmouth Player of the Season: 1993
