= Scott Thomas (footballer) =

English footballer

Personal information
- Full name: Scott Thomas
- Date of birth: 30 October 1974 (age 52)
- Place of birth: Bury, England
- Position: Midfielder

Youth career
- Manchester City

Senior career*
Years	Team	Apps	(Gls)
1992–1998	Manchester City	2	(0)
1996	→ Richmond Kickers (loan)		
1998	→ Brighton & Hove Albion (loan)	7	(0)
1999	Northwich Victoria	3	(0)
Total		11	(0)
- * Club domestic league appearances and goals

Scott Thomas (born 30 October 1974) is an English former professional footballer who played as a midfielder.

== Career ==
In his brief seven-year career, Thomas notably played in the Premier League for Manchester City and had spells on loan with Richmond Kickers and Brighton & Hove Albion. In 1999 he briefly moved to non-league side Northwich Victoria.

Thomas suffered a broken leg whilst playing with Richmond, which later lead to his retirement.

== Personal life ==
He is the father of former Manchester City and current Leeds United youth team player Luca Thomas.

Thomas went on to run and own a gym in Bolton.
