= 1992–93 Portsmouth F.C. season =

Portsmouth
1992–93 season
- Chairman: Jim Gregory
- Manager: Jim Smith
- Stadium: Fratton Park
- First Division: 3rd
- FA Cup: Third round
- League Cup: Third round
- Anglo-Italian Cup: International group stage
- Top goalscorer: League: Guy Whittingham (42); All: Guy Whittingham (47)
- Highest home attendance: 25,438 v Leicester City (First Division play-offs, 19 May 1993)
- Lowest home attendance: 2,363 v Lucchese (Anglo-Italian Cup, 8 December 1992)
- Average home league attendance: 13,706
- Biggest win: 4–0 v Birmingham City (H), First Division, 5 September 1992; 4–0 v Blackpool (A), Coca-Cola Cup, 23 September 1992; 4–0 v Tranmere Rovers (H), First Division, 21 November 1992; 4–0 v Peterborough United (H), First Division, 6 April 1993
- Biggest defeat: 1–4 v Brentford (A), First Division, 1 September 1992; 1–4 v Sunderland (A), First Division, 1 May 1993
Home colours

During the 1992–93 English football season, Portsmouth F.C. competed in the Football League First Division. They emerged as strong promotion contenders late in the season with an unbeaten run of 11 wins and a draw from 12 matches. Despite finishing level on points with West Ham United, Portsmouth missed out on automatic promotion to the Premier League on goals scored and then lost to Leicester City in the play-offs.

Portsmouth were knocked out of the Coca-Cola Cup by Ipswich Town in the third round and by Brighton & Hove Albion in the third round of the FA Cup. They also competed in the Anglo-Italian Cup but exited at the international group stage.

Paul Walsh was voted by Portsmouth supporters as their Player of the Year, while Guy Whittingham set a new club record by scoring 42 league goals, 47 in all competitions.

== Squad ==
Players who made one appearance or more for Portsmouth F.C. during the 1992-93 season

Pos.	Name	League		Play-offs		Anglo-Italian Cup		Coca-Cola Cup		FA Cup		Total	
Pos.	Name	Apps	Goals	Apps	Goals	Apps	Goals	Apps	Goals	Apps	Goals	Apps	Goals
GK	(England) Alan Knight	46	0	2	0	6	0	3	0	1	0	58	0
DF	(England) Andy Awford	44	0	2	0	6	0	3	0	1	0	56	0
DF	(England) Guy Butters	13(2)	1	1	0	1(2)	0	0(1)	0	0	0	15(5)	1
DF	(Denmark) Bjørn Kristensen	10	1	2	1	0	0	0	0	0	0	12	2
DF	(Wales) Gavin Maguire	18(3)	0	0	0	2(1)	0	2	0	0	0	22(4)	0
DF	(England) Warren Neill	28	0	2	0	3	0	3	0	0	0	36	0
DF	(England) Chris Price	13	0	2	0	0	0	0	0	0	0	15	0
DF	(England) Lee Russell	12(2)	0	0	0	2(1)	0	0	0	1	0	15(3)	0
DF	(England) Mark Stimson (on loan from Newcastle United)	3(1)	0	0	0	0	0	0	0	0	0	3(1)	0
DF	(Wales) Kit Symons	41	2	2	0	6	1	3	0	1	0	53	3
MF	(England) Steve Agnew (on loan from Blackburn Rovers)	3(2)	0	0	0	2	0	0	0	0	0	5(2)	0
MF	(England) Warren Aspinall	19(8)	2	0	0	5	2	3	0	1	0	28(8)	4
MF	(England) Chris Burns	28(4)	1	0(1)	0	5	0	1	0	1	0	35(5)	1
MF	(England) Mark Chamberlain	37(4)	4	1	0	3	0	2	0	1	0	44(4)	4
MF	(England) Ray Daniel	40	4	2	0	2	0	3	0	1	0	48	4
MF	(England) Stuart Doling	2(4)	0	0	0	1(2)	0	1(1)	0	0	0	4(7)	0
MF	(England) Martin Kuhl	3	1	0	0	1	0	0	0	0	0	4	1
MF	(England) George Lawrence	0(12)	0	1(1)	0	0	0	0	0	0	0	1(13)	0
MF	(Republic of Ireland) Alan McLoughlin	46	9	2	1	4	0	2	2	1	0	55	12
MF	(England) Shaun Murray	2(5)	0	0	0	1(2)	0	1	1	0(1)	0	4(8)	1
MF	(Jamaica) Darryl Powell	4(19)	0	1(1)	0	4(1)	2	0(1)	0	1	0	10(22)	2
MF	(England) Steve Wigley	0	0	0	0	0(1)	0	0	0	0	0	0(1)	0
FW	(Northern Ireland) Colin Clarke	11(8)	1	0	0	4	1	2	1	0	0	17(8)	3
FW	(England) Paul Hall	0	0	0(1)	0	0	0	0	0	0	0	0(1)	0
FW	(England) Mickey Ross	0	0	0	0	0(2)	0	0	0	0(1)	0	0(3)	0
FW	(England) Paul Walsh	37(6)	9	0	0	3	1	1(1)	0	1	0	42	10
FW	(England) Guy Whittingham	46	42	2	0	5	3	3	2	0	0	56	47

== League table ==
Pos	Team	Pld	W	D	L	GF	GA	GD	Pts	Qualification or relegation
1	Newcastle United (C, P)	46	29	9	8	92	38	+54	96	Promotion to the Premier League
2	West Ham United (P)	46	26	10	10	81	41	+40	88	Promotion to the Premier League
3	Portsmouth	46	26	10	10	80	46	+34	88	Qualification for the First Division play-offs
4	Tranmere Rovers	46	23	10	13	72	56	+16	79	Qualification for the First Division play-offs
5	Swindon Town (O, P)	46	21	13	12	74	59	+15	76	Qualification for the First Division play-offs

Source: rsssf.com
Rules for classification: 1) Points; 2) Goals scored; 3) Goal difference
(C) Champions; (O) Play-off winners; (P) Promoted

== Results ==
=== First Division ===
Date	Opponent	Venue	Result	Scorers	Attendance
15 August 1992	Bristol City	A	3–3	Whittingham 3	15,301
22 August 1992	Barnsley	H	1–0	Whittingham	11,473
29 August 1992	Leicester City	A	0–1		14,780
1 September 1992	Brentford	A	1–4	Symons	8,471
5 September 1992	Birmingham City	H	4–0	Daniel, Walsh, Kuhl, Whittingham	12,152
12 September 1992	Newcastle United	A	1–3	Whittingham	29,885
18 September 1992	Southend United	A	0–0		5,267
27 September 1992	West Ham United	H	0–1		12,158
3 October 1992	Luton Town	A	4–1	Whittingham 3, Clarke	7,954
10 October 1992	Swindon Town	H	3–1	McLoughlin, Whittingham, Chamberlain	12,442
17 October 1992	Wolverhampton Wanderers	A	1–1	Whittingham	14,750
24 October 1992	Sunderland	H	2–0	Whittingham, Burns	10,689
31 October 1992	Grimsby Town	A	0–3		5,708
3 November 1992	Oxford United	A	5–5	McLoughlin, Whittingham 2, Evans (o.g.), Chamberlain	5,490
7 November 1992	Cambridge United	H	3–0	McLoughlin, Whittingham 2	8,956
14 November 1992	Watford	A	0–0		8,714
21 November 1992	Tranmere Rovers	H	4–0	McLoughlin, Whittingham, Walsh, Daniel	9,982
28 November 1992	Millwall	H	1–0	McLoughlin	12,445
5 December 1992	Charlton Athletic	A	0–1		8,337
12 December 1992	Peterborough United	A	1–1	Whittingham	6,516
19 December 1992	Notts County	H	0–0		8,943
26 December 1992	Bristol Rovers	H	4–1	Whittingham 4	14,288
28 December 1992	Derby County	A	4–2	Whittingham 2, McLoughlin 2	21,478
9 January 1993	Southend United	H	2–0	Whittingham, Walsh	9,717
16 January 1993	West Ham United	A	0–2		18,127
23 January 1993	Brentford	H	1–0	Aspinall (pen.)	10,267
30 January 1993	Barnsley	A	1–1	Whittingham	6,551
6 February 1993	Bristol City	H	2–3	Walsh, Whittingham	10,675
9 February 1993	Newcastle United	H	2–0	Whittingham, Symons	21,028
13 February 1993	Birmingham City	A	3–2	McLoughlin, Whittingham 2	10,935
20 February 1993	Leicester City	H	1–1	Walsh	14,160
27 February 1993	Swindon Town	A	0–1		14,077
6 March 1993	Luton Town	H	2–1	Whittingham, Aspinall (pen.)	10,457
9 March 1993	Watford	H	1–0	Chamberlain	10,716
13 March 1993	Cambridge United	A	1–0	Clayton (o.g.)	5,975
20 March 1993	Charlton Athletic	H	1–0	Whittingham	12,854
23 March 1993	Tranmere Rovers	A	2–0	Whittingham 2 (1 pen.)	7,472
27 March 1993	Oxford United	H	3–0	Robinson (o.g.), McLoughlin, Whittingham	14,648
3 April 1993	Millwall	A	1–1	Chamberlain	12,921
6 April 1993	Peterborough United	H	4–0	Whittingham 3, Butters	15,093
10 April 1993	Bristol Rovers	A	2–1	Kristensen, Whittingham	5,377
12 April 1993	Derby County	H	3–0	Whittingham, Walsh 2	23,805
17 April 1993	Notts County	A	1–0	Walsh	11,014
24 April 1993	Wolverhampton Wanderers	H	2–0	Daniel, Walsh	23,074
1 May 1993	Sunderland	A	1–4	Whittingham	21,309
8 May 1993	Grimsby Town	H	2–1	Daniel, Whittingham	24,955

=== First Division play-offs ===
Round	Date	Opponent	Venue	Result	Goalscorers	Attendance
SF(1L)	16 May 1993	Leicester City	A*	0–1	24,538	
SF(2L)	19 May 1993	Leicester City	H	2–2 (lost 2–3 on agg.)	25,438	McLoughlin, Kristensen

*Played at the City Ground due to construction work at Filbert Street.

=== Anglo-Italian Cup ===
Round	Date	Opponent	Venue	Result	Goalscorers	Attendance
PG6	15 September 1992	Charlton Athletic	A	3–1	Aspinall, Whittingham, Clarke	1,853
PG6	29 September 1992	Millwall	H	1–1	Whittingham	2,535
IGA	11 November 1992	Cesena	H	2–0	Walsh, Symons	4,752
IGA	24 November 1992	Bari	A	0–3		800
IGA	8 December 1992	Lucchese	H	2–1	Powell 2	2,363
IGA	16 December 1992	Ascoli	A	2–1	Whittingham, Aspinall	500

=== Coca-Cola Cup ===
Round	Date	Opponent	Venue	Result	Goalscorers	Attendance
2(1L)	23 September 1992	Blackpool	A	4–0	Clarke, McLoughlin 2, Murray	4,422
2(2L)	6 October 1992	Blackpool	H	2–0	Whittingham 2	3,096
3	27 October 1992	Ipswich Town	H	0–1		10,773

=== FA Cup ===
Round	Date	Opponent	Venue	Result	Goalscorers	Attendance
3	2 January 1993	Brighton & Hove Albion	A	0–1		17,851
