= Craig Johnston =

Australian soccer player (born 1960)

Personal information
- Full name: Craig Peter Johnston
- Date of birth: 25 June 1960 (age 66)
- Place of birth: Johannesburg, Union of South Africa
- Height: 5 ft 8 in (1.73 m)
- Position: Midfielder

Youth career
- Lake Macquarie City
- Sydney City
- 1975–1977: Middlesbrough

Senior career*
Years	Team	Apps	(Gls)
1977–1981	Middlesbrough	64	(16)
1978	→ Newcastle KB (loan)	9	(0)
1981–1988	Liverpool	190	(30)
1982	→ Newcastle KB (loan)	4	(4)
Total		267	(50)

International career
1980–1981	England U21	2	(0)
- * Club domestic league appearances and goals

Craig Peter Johnston (born 25 June 1960) is a former professional soccer player. He played as a midfielder in the English Football League between 1977 and 1988, for Middlesbrough and Liverpool. Nicknamed "Skippy", Johnston was a crowd favourite at Anfield, making 271 Liverpool appearances and scoring 40 goals. He was a key member of the 1986 "double" winning team. He also co-wrote the team's 1988 cup final song "Anfield Rap". Johnston's career ended prematurely when aged 27, he retired from football to take care of his ill sister.

Johnston designed and created the prototype for one of the world's largest selling football boots of all time, the Adidas Predator, worn by many footballers and rugby players.

== Childhood ==
Johnston was born in Johannesburg, South Africa to Australian parents of Scottish descent; he returned home to Australia with his family as a small child. At the age of six, Johnston contracted osteomyelitis and came close to losing his leg and would have done if not for the expertise of an American specialist who was touring and lecturing in Australia at the time.

He began his career at Lake Macquarie City in Newcastle, New South Wales. Encouraged by his father Colin, who had trialled at Preston North End and Dundee United, aged 15, he wrote to several English clubs, with Middlesbrough replying. His parents sold their house to pay for the flight to England.

== Career in England ==
In his first match as a trialist, at half time and 3–0 down he was told by then manager Jack Charlton "you are the worst footballer I have ever seen in my life. You won't make a player while your arse still points to the ground". He was told to "hop it" therefore losing his room at the hotel for all the trialists. He stayed in a cleaned out coal shed behind the hotel. Refusing to give up, he trained alone in a car park near Ayresome Park where he was spotted by then Boro captain Graeme Souness.

Middlesbrough, managed by John Neal now, signed Johnston in 1977 making his first team debut for Middlesbrough, aged 17, in a 3–2 FA Cup victory against Everton. His league debut came on 4 February 1978 in a 2–1 victory over Birmingham City at St Andrew's and he scored his first goal later that season in a 2–1 home league defeat to West Ham United. Johnston scored 16 goals in 64 league games for Middlesbrough before moving to Liverpool in 1981 for £650,000

Johnston made his Liverpool debut in August 1981, coming on as sub for Ray Kennedy in the 1–0 league defeat to Wolverhampton Wanderers at Molineux. Johnston's first start came in the Intercontinental Cup fixture against Brazilian side Flamengo.

Johnston scored his first goal for Liverpool on 8 December 1981 against Arsenal at Anfield, during a League Cup fourth round replay. Johnston opened the scoring in the fifth minute of extra time in a 3–0 win. Johnston became a crowd favourite at Anfield during his long spell with the club. He worked under three managers – Bob Paisley, Joe Fagan and Kenny Dalglish – and, when picked, predominantly played on the right side of midfield. He made 271 appearances for the club and scored 40 goals.

Johnston was part of the League championship-winning teams of 1982 and 1983 and gained a League Cup winner's medal in 1983. In 1984, Johnston was part of the team which won a treble of League championship, League Cup and European Cup. Two years later he was an integral part of the side which won only the third League championship and FA Cup "double" of the 20th century. In the 1986 FA Cup final at Wembley, Johnston became the first Australian to score in a final, converting a Jan Molby cross to put Liverpool 2–1 ahead against Everton. Ian Rush secured the win with a late third.

He started the 1987–88 season but lost his place on the right side of midfield after the signing in the autumn of 1987 of Ray Houghton; thereafter he was a frequent substitute and occasional starter as Liverpool again won the League title and reached the FA Cup final, aiming to complete a second "double". Johnston wrote the club's traditional Cup final song called "Anfield Rap" which combined pro-Liverpool lyrics with the rap and house trends of the time, with other Liverpool players contributing.

His last two goals for the Reds came in the penultimate league game of the season, a 5–1 away win over Sheffield Wednesday. By this stage, Liverpool had wrapped up the 17th league title of their history.

== International career ==
Despite Johnston's success in domestic football, he never played international football for Australia. Johnston attributed this to an unwillingness on Liverpool & Middlesbrough's parts to release him for international games they viewed as being unimportant and exhausting from a jetlag perspective (a challenge other Australian players of the era faced from their domestic clubs, such as Tony Dorigo), as well as a desire to stay established in the domestic team rather than disrupt this progress. Johnston also asked the Australian FA for financial support to travel home, which they rejected. Socceroos coach Frank Arok stated that Johnston wanted to be paid the same amount per week when playing for Australia as what he was paid for playing for Liverpool - an infeasible amount for the AFA to pay.

Early in his career in England he had described playing football for Australia as "like surfing for England."

Johnston was approached by Jock Stein in the early 1980s with a view to him playing for Scotland as he was eligible through his father. Johnston declined Stein's offer. He did represent England at under-21 level against Norway in September 1980 at The Dell and against the Republic of Ireland at Anfield in February 1981. Johnston was also eligible to represent South Africa.

== Retirement ==
After 270 appearances and 40 goals and just days before the 1988 FA Cup Final at Wembley against Wimbledon, Johnston announced his premature retirement from football to manager Kenny Dalglish. The story was leaked by a tabloid newspaper on the morning of cup final day, much to the player and club's anger.

In December 1987, Johnston's sister Faye became seriously ill and was admitted to a hospital in Morocco. She had suffered from butane gas inhalation from a faulty heater in her hotel. Johnston was at the club's Christmas party when hearing the news. He flew out and brought her back to London by air ambulance. He also brought his parents over from Australia. She woke on New Year's Eve, after three weeks in coma. "We all thought Faye would get better but she didn't. Time went on and we tried all sorts of things, took her to Malaysia, to neurologists… nobody could help. So I retired from football, it was a big decision. It was time to go home. Once back in Australia we realised that Faye wasn't getting better and apparently she never would."

Johnston made his 271st and final appearance as a red, as a substitute for John Aldridge in the final (who had just seen his penalty saved with Liverpool a goal down) thus ending up on the losing side. In 1991, when Graeme Souness was manager of Liverpool F.C, he asked Johnston if he would like to train with the team with a view to playing again. Liverpool still held Johnston's registration as a player. It didn't work out and Johnston moved on. After his retirement he was linked to clubs from all over the world. Johnston always retorted this speculation stating that he could never play for anyone other than Liverpool.

== Business career ==
After retiring from playing football, Johnston found success as a businessman and innovator, designing and creating the prototype for Adidas Predator football boot, worn by many of the world's top players of both football and rugby including Zinedine Zidane, David Beckham, Steven Gerrard, Xavi, Jonny Wilkinson and Ronan O'Gara. Getting the first boot off the ground took Johnston 5 years and was initially refused by Adidas, as well as Nike and Reebok. However, Johnston then filmed German legends Franz Beckenbauer, Karl-Heinz Rummenigge and Paul Breitner using the boots in snowy conditions, which led to Adidas agreeing to the proposal.

He later designed another innovative boot called The Pig or, to give them their full title, the Patented Interactive Grip can come as a 'skin' that can be placed over the toe of an existing boot. The design earned him a nomination for British designer of the year, losing out to a multimedia designer.

Johnston also invented the Traxion sole for football boots and the software program the 'Butler,' a device that shows what has been removed from minibars in hotel bedrooms.

Johnston invested heavily in a football school idea for inner city children but failed to win expected business backing and went bankrupt. He was made temporarily homeless as a result.

== Other activities ==
Johnston was the creator of TV game show The Main Event, which aired for two years in the early 1990s in Australia and a season in the UK in 1993.

Though he travels the world with his business interests, Johnston remains based in Australia. He has been recognised at home for his achievements in England. On 18 June 2006, Johnston made an appearance as a guest on The Footy Show World Cup Spectacular in Germany revealing information on his career.

During the 2010 FIFA World Cup, Johnston wrote a 12-page letter to FIFA president, Sepp Blatter, in which he collected all criticism by players and coaches of the controversial Adidas-produced Jabulani ball, risking his reputation, and expecting to be blacklisted by the conservative governing body as a result of this letter.

In 2005, Johnston was inducted into the Football Australia Hall of Fame.

Johnston has now forged a new career as a photographer.

== Career statistics ==
=== Club ===
Appearances and goals by club, season and competition
Club	Season	League			FA Cup		League Cup		Europe		Other		Total	
Club	Season	Division	Apps	Goals	Apps	Goals	Apps	Goals	Apps	Goals	Apps	Goals	Apps	Goals
Middlesbrough	1977–78	First Division	5	1	1	0	0	0	—		0	0	6	1
Middlesbrough	1978–79	First Division	2	0	0	0	0	0	—		0	0	2	0
Newcastle KB (loan)	1978	Australia NSL	9	0	0	0	0	0	—		0	0	9	0
Middlesbrough	1979–80	First Division	30	5	0	0	3	0	—		0	0	33	5
Middlesbrough	1980–81	First Division	27	10	4	0	1	0	—		0	0	32	10
Middlesbrough	Total		64	16	5	0	4	0	0	0	0	0	73	16
Newcastle KB (loan)	1982	Australia NSL	4	4	0	0	0	0	—		0	0	4	4
Liverpool	1981–82	First Division	18	6	1	0	2	1	1 (Note: Appearances in European Cup)	0	1 (Note: Appearance in Intercontinental Cup)	0	23	7
Liverpool	1982–83	First Division	33	7	3	1	6	1	4	1	0	0	46	10
Liverpool	1983–84	First Division	29	2	2	1	12	0	8	1	1 (Note: Appearance in FA Charity Shield)	0	52	4
Liverpool	1984–85	First Division	11	0	0	0	1	0	4	0	1	0	17	0
Liverpool	1985–86	First Division	41	7	8	1	7	1	0	0	5 (Note: Appearances in Football League Super Cup)	1	61	10
Liverpool	1986–87	First Division	28	3	3	0	5	0	0	0	1	0	37	3
Liverpool	1987–88	First Division	30	5	3	1	2	0	0	0	0	0	35	6
Liverpool	Total		190	30	20	4	35	3	17	2	9	1	271	40
Career total			267	46	25	4	39	3	17	2	9	1	357	56

== Honours ==
Liverpool

- Football League First Division: 1981–82, 1982–83, 1983–84, 1985–86, 1987–88
- FA Cup: 1985–86; runner-up: 1987–88
- Football League Cup: 1982–83, 1983–84; runner-up: 1986–87
- FA Charity Shield: 1982, 1986
- European Cup: 1983–84

Individual

- Football Australia Hall of Fame: 2005
- PFA Alex Tobin OAM Medal: 2009
