= 1986 FA Cup final =

English association football match

1986 FA Cup Final
- The match programme cover
- Event: 1985–86 FA Cup
Everton	Liverpool
1	3
- Date: 10 May 1986
- Venue: Wembley Stadium, London
- Referee: Alan Robinson (Hampshire)
- Attendance: 98,000

The 1986 FA Cup final was the 105th final of the FA Cup. It took place on 10 May 1986 at Wembley Stadium and was a Merseyside derby between Everton and Liverpool. The match was played seven days after Liverpool had secured the league title, with Everton finishing as runners-up. At the time, Everton and Liverpool were widely regarded as the two leading English clubs.

== Summary ==
Liverpool won the match 3–1, thus completing the Double in Kenny Dalglish’s first season as a player manager. Everton led at half-time through Gary Lineker, before the second half saw Ian Rush score two goals and Craig Johnston one. As Liverpool had already won the league, Everton would have claimed a place in the 1986–87 European Cup Winners' Cup, but the ban on English clubs in European competitions following the Heysel disaster the previous season meant that they were unable to do so (in addition to Liverpool not claiming a place in the European Cup for their league win).

This was Liverpool's third FA Cup Final victory, and their first since 1974. Everton, meanwhile, were playing in their third consecutive FA Cup Final and suffered their second consecutive defeat; notable changes from the side that had lost to Manchester United the previous year were Bobby Mimms in goal in place of the injured Neville Southall – Everton had signed veteran Pat Jennings on a short-term deal as emergency cover – and new signing Gary Lineker playing in the forward position that had previously been occupied by Andy Gray.

As substitute Steve McMahon was unused, Liverpool became the first team to compete in the FA Cup Final without fielding an English player since Queen's Park fielded all-Scottish teams in 1884 and 1885. Craig Johnston became the first Australian to score in a FA Cup Final, when he put Liverpool ahead in the second half.

Twenty years later, in April 2006, the final was replayed in a charity game at Anfield, in aid of The Marina Dalglish Appeal. Liverpool won the match 1–0 after a late goal from John Durnin.

== Match details ==
10 May 1986
15:00 BST

Everton	1–3	Liverpool
Lineker 27'	Report	Rush 56', 83'; Johnston 62'

Wembley Stadium, London
Attendance: 98,000
Referee: Alan Robinson (Hampshire)

Everton	Liverpool

GK	1	(England) Bobby Mimms
RB	2	(England) Gary Stevens	(substituted off) 72'
CB	4	(Wales) Kevin Ratcliffe (c)
CB	5	(England) Derek Mountfield
LB	3	(Wales) Pat Van Den Hauwe
RM	7	(England) Trevor Steven
CM	6	(England) Peter Reid
CM	10	(England) Paul Bracewell
LM	11	(Republic of Ireland) Kevin Sheedy
CF	8	(England) Gary Lineker
CF	9	(Scotland) Graeme Sharp
Substitute:
FW	12	(England) Adrian Heath	(substituted on) 72'
Manager:
(England) Howard Kendall

GK	1	(Zimbabwe) Bruce Grobbelaar
RB	4	(Scotland) Steve Nicol
CB	2	(Republic of Ireland) Mark Lawrenson
CB	6	(Scotland) Alan Hansen (c)
LB	3	(Republic of Ireland) Jim Beglin
RM	8	(Australia) Craig Johnston
CM	10	(Denmark) Jan Mølby
CM	11	(Scotland) Kevin MacDonald
LM	5	(Republic of Ireland) Ronnie Whelan
SS	7	(Scotland) Kenny Dalglish
CF	9	(Wales) Ian Rush
Substitute:
MF	12	(England) Steve McMahon
Player-manager:
(Scotland) Kenny Dalglish
