= Kevin MacDonald (footballer) =

Scottish football player and manager (born 1960)

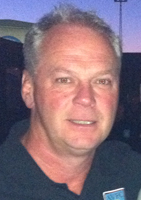
- MacDonald in 2011

Personal information
- Full name: Kevin Duncan MacDonald
- Date of birth: 22 November 1960 (age 65)
- Place of birth: Inverness, Scotland
- Height: 6 ft 1 in (1.85 m)
- Position: Midfielder

Youth career
- Inverness Caledonian

Senior career*
Years	Team	Apps	(Gls)
1976–1984	Leicester City	138	(8)
1984–1989	Liverpool	40	(1)
1987	→ Leicester City (loan)	3	(0)
1988	→ Rangers (loan)	3	(0)
1989–1991	Coventry City	31	(0)
1990–1991	→ Cardiff City (loan)	8	(0)
1991–1993	Walsall	53	(7)
Total		276	(16)

Managerial career
- 1994: Leicester City (caretaker)
- 1995–2012: Aston Villa Reserves
- 2006–2007: Republic of Ireland (assistant)
- 2010: Aston Villa (caretaker)
- 2013: Swindon Town
- 2015: Aston Villa (assistant)
- 2015: Aston Villa (caretaker)
- 2018: Aston Villa (caretaker)
- * Club domestic league appearances and goals

Kevin Duncan MacDonald (born 22 November 1960) is a Scottish former footballer who is the former manager of Swindon Town and caretaker manager of Aston Villa on three occasions. As a player MacDonald was a member of the Liverpool "double" winning side of 1986.

Prior to taking his first managerial job at Swindon MacDonald's career most notably included a spell as caretaker manager at Aston Villa following the resignation of Martin O'Neill on 9 August 2010. MacDonald also worked as assistant manager of the Republic of Ireland, with his ex-Liverpool teammate Steve Staunton, who he used to coach at Aston Villa. In 1994, he also spent a short time as caretaker manager at Leicester City.

== Playing career ==
MacDonald was discovered by Leicester City while playing for his home town club, Inverness Caledonian, in the Highland League.

MacDonald joined Liverpool from Leicester for £400,000 in November 1984. He never commanded a regular spot at Anfield, but he was in the team at the right time, helping Liverpool to the First Division title in 1986 and then to the "double" (only the third in the 20th century) when he helped them beat Everton in the 1986 FA Cup Final at Wembley.

At the start of the following season, MacDonald broke his leg against Southampton on 20 September 1986. By the time he recovered Kenny Dalglish had settled on Steve McMahon for the central midfield role. He made no appearances for the rest of the 1986–87 season, and just one appearance in the 1987–88 season (in the league against Luton Town on 9 May 1988). In his final season at the club, 1988–89, he made just five competitive appearances before he later had spells on loan at his old club Leicester and also at Rangers. In April 1989, shortly before he left Liverpool, MacDonald, along with his teammates, rallied round the bereaved families of the Hillsborough disaster. He scored three competitive goals in his time at Liverpool (one in the league, one in the FA Cup and one in the League Cup) as well as two goals in the Football League Super Cup, all of which came in the 1985–86 season. In June 1989 he made a permanent move to Coventry City and played out his career.

== Management and coaching ==
=== Leicester City ===
In November 1994, MacDonald was named caretaker manager of Leicester City for a short period between the departure of Brian Little and the arrival of Mark McGhee.

=== Aston Villa ===
In August 2010, following the immediate resignation of former Aston Villa manager Martin O'Neill, he assumed the role of caretaker manager at the club. He had previously been the manager of Villa's successful reserve side and assistant manager of the Republic of Ireland national side under Steve Staunton. MacDonald had been employed by Aston Villa since 1995 and had held a number of different positions at the club.

MacDonald's first game as caretaker manager came at Villa Park against West Ham United on the opening day of the 2010–11 Premier League season which Villa won 3–0 including the last goal for James Milner as a Villa player. He then led Villa to a 1–1 draw in their Europa League qualifier first-leg match against Rapid Vienna. His second league game in charge resulted in a 6–0 defeat to Newcastle United.

Villa named Gérard Houllier as their permanent manager on 8 September 2010; however, MacDonald remained in charge for the following two Premier League matches against Stoke City and Bolton due to Houllier having to work his notice with the French Football Federation.

With the departure of Houllier and his number 2, Gary McAllister, the Villa hierarchy let it be known that MacDonald and Gordon Cowans would have futures at the club no matter who the new manager was.

On 13 December 2018, Aston Villa suspended MacDonald after allegations of bullying from ex-midfielder Gareth Farrelly. Farrelly gave an interview to the Guardian newspaper where he described MacDonald as being "relentlessly negative" to him in the 1990s. Furthermore, Farrelly claimed MacDonald was "incredibly aggressive, with constant verbal and physical bullying". Other players came forward to give information including Greg Walters a trainee at Aston Villa between 1998 and 2000. Villa initiated an internal investigation and MacDonald was temporarily reassigned to non-player facing duties. On 20 August 2019, Aston Villa announced MacDonald's departure with immediate effect. Aston Villa apologised to all former players that came forward as part of the investigation into MacDonald's behaviour. In the club's statement it said "Aston Villa wishes to apologise to all former players who were affected by behaviour which would not be tolerated by the Club today".

=== Swindon Town ===
On 28 February 2013, it was announced MacDonald was the new manager of Swindon Town in League One. MacDonald led the team into the 2013 League One play-offs following a 6th place league finish but lost 5–4 on penalties to Brentford in the semi-finals.

On 12 July 2013, he failed to attend a pre-season friendly with Forest Green Rovers at The New Lawn for what was described by Swindon as 'personal problems' and after six months in the job, it was announced that he had quit the club the following day.

== Honours ==
Liverpool

- FA Cup: 1985–86
