= Football League Super Cup =

Tournament details
- Country: England
- Dates: 17 September 1985 – 30 September 1986
- Teams: 6

Final positions
- Champions: Liverpool
- Runners-up: Everton

Tournament statistics
- Matches played: 18
- Goals scored: 49 (2.72 per match)
- Top goal scorer: Ian Rush (7 goals)

The Football League Super Cup (known for sponsorship reasons as the Screen Sport Super Cup) was a one-off football club competition held in England in the 1985–86 season. It was organised by the Football League and was intended as a form of financial and sporting compensation for the English clubs which had qualified for European competition in the previous season but had been banned from entering European tournaments by UEFA following the Heysel Stadium disaster. With the ban set to last into the foreseeable future, England's clubs stood to lose a great deal of revenue, and would also have fewer opportunities to win silverware, so the Super Cup was established in the hope of offsetting at least some of this lost income, as well as offering additional competition for them.

The Football League's original intention was to hold the Super Cup annually for the duration of the UEFA ban on English clubs (which ultimately turned out to be five years) but the competition was largely seen as a poor substitute for the glamour of European tournaments and offered nothing different from the two domestic knockout competitions that already existed, the FA Cup and League Cup. Consequently, it generated minimal interest from the clubs involved. With the competition's final postponed until the beginning of the following season due to fixture congestion, the Super Cup was ultimately abolished after only one tournament had been held.

The tournament was sponsored by Screensport.

== Format ==
The six clubs invited to participate, and the European competitions they would have qualified for, were:

- Everton (Football League champions, European Cup)
- Manchester United (FA Cup winners, European Cup Winners' Cup)
- Norwich City (League Cup winners, UEFA Cup)
- Liverpool (UEFA Cup)
- Tottenham Hotspur (UEFA Cup)
- Southampton (UEFA Cup)

To create a sufficient number of games, the teams played each other home and away in two groups of three teams, with three points awarded for a win and one point for a draw, with the top two teams in each group advancing to the semi-finals. Both the semi-finals and the final were held over two legs, home and away, which was perhaps another factor which may have contributed to the competition's failure to attract much interest from the clubs participating, as the tournament did not offer the prospect of a day out at Wembley for the finalists.

== Competition history ==
Merseyside rivals Liverpool and Everton won through to the final, but with both these clubs being involved in a battle for the league championship and both of them also reaching the FA Cup final (as well as Liverpool being involved in the semi-finals of the Football League Cup), fixture congestion became a problem, with Liverpool's semi-final second leg having to be delayed until the final week of the season, two days before the FA Cup final. The English football season had to come to an end immediately following the FA Cup final due to the preparations for the imminent FIFA World Cup in Mexico (which many Everton and Liverpool players were to be involved in), which meant that there was no opportunity for the delayed Super Cup final to be played after the FA Cup final and that the Super Cup tournament could not be concluded before the 1985–86 season ended.

The absence of any conclusion of the Super Cup before the season's end may have put paid to any possibility of a second Super Cup tournament being organised in the 1986–87 season, although the perceived failure of the inaugural competition and its unpopularity with the clubs made such an eventuality unlikely in any case. (If the 1986–87 Super Cup had been staged, it would have been contested by Liverpool, Everton, West Ham United, Manchester United, Sheffield Wednesday and Oxford United).

Ultimately the 1985–86 Super Cup final had to be held over until the following season and was finally played in September 1986, by which point the competition had finally attracted some sponsorship. Everton, however, fielded a virtual reserve team in the two-legged final (although they were in the middle of a genuine injury crisis) and Liverpool won the trophy 7–2 on aggregate. The games are remembered for Ian Rush's impressive haul of five goals for Liverpool over the two games (although these goals are sometimes excluded from his official record-breaking Merseyside derby tally) and for Kevin Sheedy's spectacular goal for Everton at Anfield, scored from a long-range free-kick at the Kop end. Having lost the League and Cup double to Liverpool the previous May, Everton later that season managed to pip Liverpool to the League Championship.

The Super Cup was not a success as it was unable to substitute for games against the best sides in Europe in prestigious UEFA competitions. Attendances were generally poor and the clubs involved apparently regarded the tournament as a pointless addition to the existing three national tournaments and a source of fixture congestion. Consequently, the Super Cup was abolished after only one season and it has not been held since. The competition is now largely forgotten.

== Similar competitions ==
The Full Members' Cup, another Football League cup competition also launched in 1985 for similar reasons (to create additional competition, revenue and opportunity for silverware for English clubs, as well as a final at Wembley Stadium), fared marginally better and ran until 1992, often better remembered as the "ZDS Cup" due to that competition being sponsored by Zenith Data Systems. A similar competition to the Super Cup, the Mercantile Credit Centenary Trophy was played in the early weeks of 1988–89 to celebrate the league's 100th birthday between the top eight Football League teams from the previous season. The competition, played over three rounds on a knock-out basis, was won by Arsenal.

== Group stage ==
Key to colours in group tables
Top two places advance to the semi-finals

=== Group 1 ===
Team	Pld	W	D	L	GF	GA	GD	Pts
Everton	4	3	0	1	6	3	+3	9
Norwich City	4	1	2	1	3	3	0	5
Manchester United	4	0	2	2	4	7	−3	2

18 September 1985
Manchester United	2–4	Everton
2 October 1985
Everton	1–0	Norwich City
23 October 1985
Norwich City	1–0	Everton
6 November 1985
Manchester United	1–1	Norwich City
4 December 1985
Everton	1–0	Manchester United
11 December 1985
Norwich City	1–1	Manchester United

=== Group 2 ===
Team	Pld	W	D	L	GF	GA	GD	Pts
Liverpool	4	3	1	0	8	2	+6	10
Tottenham Hotspur	4	2	0	2	5	7	−2	6
Southampton	4	0	1	3	4	8	−4	1

17 September 1985
Liverpool	2–1	Southampton
2 October 1985
Tottenham Hotspur	2–1	Southampton
22 October 1985
Southampton	1–1	Liverpool
3 December 1985
Liverpool	2–0	Tottenham Hotspur
17 December 1985
Southampton	1–3	Tottenham Hotspur
14 January 1986
Tottenham Hotspur	0–3	Liverpool

== Knockout stage ==
=== Semi-finals ===
==== First leg ====
5 February 1986

Norwich City	1–1	Liverpool
Drinkell 49'	Report	Dalglish 79'

Carrow Road, Norwich
Attendance: 15,313
5 February 1986

Tottenham Hotspur	0–0	Everton

White Hart Lane, London
Attendance: 7,548

==== Second leg ====
19 March 1986

Everton	3–1 (a.e.t.)	Tottenham Hotspur
Heath 77'; Mountfield 91'; Sharp 112'		Falco 48'

Goodison Park, Liverpool
Attendance: 12,008

Everton won 3–1 on aggregate

6 May 1986

Liverpool	3–1	Norwich City
MacDonald 56'; Mølby 72' (pen.); Johnston 79'	Report	Brooke 2'

Anfield, Liverpool
Attendance: 26,690

Liverpool won 4–2 on aggregate

=== Final ===
==== First leg ====
16 September 1986

Liverpool	3–1	Everton
Rush 6', 65'; McMahon 56'	Report; Report	Sheedy 40'

Anfield, Liverpool
Attendance: 20,660

Liverpool
Everton

GK	1	(England) Mike Hooper
RB	2	(England) Barry Venison
LB	3	(Republic of Ireland) Jim Beglin
CB	4	(Republic of Ireland) Mark Lawrenson
LM	5	(Republic of Ireland) Ronnie Whelan	Substituted off
CB	6	(Scotland) Gary Gillespie
SS	7	(Scotland) Kenny Dalglish
RM	8	(Scotland) Steve Nicol
CF	9	(Wales) Ian Rush
CM	10	(Scotland) Kevin MacDonald
CM	11	(England) Steve McMahon
Substitutes:
MF	12	(Scotland) John Wark
MF	14	(Denmark) Jan Mølby	Substituted on
Player/Manager:
(Scotland) Kenny Dalglish

GK	1	(England) Bobby Mimms
RB	2	(England) Peter Billing
LB	3	(England) Paul Power
CB	4	(Wales) Kevin Ratcliffe (c)
CB	5	(England) Ian Marshall
CM	6	(England) Kevin Langley
RM	7	(England) Neil Adams
ST	8	(England) Paul Wilkinson
ST	9	(Scotland) Graeme Sharp
CM	10	(England) Trevor Steven
LM	11	(Republic of Ireland) Kevin Sheedy	Substituted off
Substitutes:
MF		(England) Warren Aspinall	Substituted on
Manager:
(England) Howard Kendall

==== Second leg ====
30 September 1986

Everton	1–4	Liverpool
Sharp 88' (pen.)	Report; Report	Rush 10', 27', 84'; Nicol 62'

Goodison Park, Liverpool
Attendance: 26,068

Everton
Liverpool

GK	1	(England) Bobby Mimms
RB	2	(England) Peter Billing
LB	3	(England) Paul Power
CB	4	(Wales) Kevin Ratcliffe (c)
CB	5	(England) Derek Mountfield
CM	6	(England) Trevor Steven
RM	7	(England) Neil Adams
CM	8	(England) Adrian Heath
ST	9	(Scotland) Graeme Sharp
ST	10	(England) Paul Wilkinson
LM	11	(Republic of Ireland) Kevin Sheedy	Substituted off
Substitute:
MF		(England) Warren Aspinall	Substituted on	Substituted off
DF		(England) Neil Pointon		Substituted on
Manager:
(England) Howard Kendall

GK	1	(Zimbabwe) Bruce Grobbelaar
RB	2	(Scotland) Gary Gillespie
LB	3	(Republic of Ireland) Jim Beglin
CB	4	(Republic of Ireland) Mark Lawrenson
LM	5	(Republic of Ireland) Ronnie Whelan
CB	6	(Scotland) Alan Hansen (c)
SS	7	(Scotland) John Wark
RM	8	(Scotland) Steve Nicol	Substituted off
CF	9	(Wales) Ian Rush
CM	10	(Denmark) Jan Mølby
CM	11	(England) Steve McMahon	Substituted off
Substitute:
DF	12	(England) Barry Venison	Substituted on
FW	14	(England) Paul Walsh	Substituted on
Player/Manager:
(Scotland) Kenny Dalglish

Liverpool won 7–2 on aggregate

== Top goalscorers ==
Player	Club	Goals
Ian Rush	Liverpool	7
Mark Falco	Tottenham Hotspur	4
Graeme Sharp	Everton	3
Kevin Sheedy	Everton	3
