= Clive Goodyear =

English footballer

Personal information
- Date of birth: 15 January 1961 (age 65)
- Place of birth: Lincoln, England
- Height: 6 ft 0 in (1.83 m)
- Position: Defender

Senior career*
Years	Team	Apps	(Gls)
- Lincoln United
1979–1984	Luton Town	90	(4)
1984–1987	Plymouth Argyle	106	(5)
1987–1990	Wimbledon	26	(0)
1990–1991	Brentford	10	(0)
1991–1993	Ernest Borel		
Total		242	(9)
- * Club domestic league appearances and goals

Clive Goodyear (born 15 January 1961) is an English former footballer who played as a defender. He made 232 appearances in the English Football League for Luton Town, Plymouth Argyle, Wimbledon and Brentford. Goodyear also played in the 1988 FA Cup final.

== Life and career ==
He started his career at Luton Town, after five years with the Hatters moved to Plymouth Argyle, and after three seasons with Plymouth he moved to Wimbledon. In the 1988 FA Cup final, in which Wimbledon famously upset Liverpool 1–0, Goodyear was adjudged to have fouled John Aldridge, which gave Liverpool a controversial penalty. Aldridge took it, but Wimbledon goalkeeper Dave Beasant saved it.

Although being named in the squad for that Cup Final, he was not a regular in the side and only made 26 appearances in three years and was sold to Brentford, where he spent one season.

He finished his career in Hong Kong with Ernest Borel. After sustaining a major knee injury he began studying physiotherapy and returned to Luton Town as a physiotherapist in 1993. He was then a physio at Cardiff City and Chester City.

== Honours ==
Wimbledon

- FA Cup: 1987–88
