= John McGregor (footballer, born 1963) =

Scottish footballer

Personal information
- Date of birth: 5 January 1963 (age 63)
- Place of birth: Airdrie, Scotland
- Height: 5 ft 11 in (1.80 m)
- Position: Defender

Senior career*
Years	Team	Apps	(Gls)
1979–1982	Queen's Park	105	(19)
1982–1987	Liverpool	0	(0)
1983–1984	→ St Mirren (loan)	5	(1)
1985	→ Leeds United (loan)	5	(0)
1987–1992	Rangers	26	(0)
- * Club domestic league appearances and goals

John McGregor (born 5 January 1963) is a former professional footballer.

== Career ==
McGregor started his career at Queen's Park after signing from Bargeddie Amateurs. He went on to make over a hundred appearances for the Spiders, becoming a mainstay in the side for over three seasons.

He then joined English side Liverpool. He stayed five years on Merseyside making no appearances for the 1st team.

McGregor returned to Glasgow with Rangers. He joined the club on a free transfer in 1987 and made his debut on 8 August 1987 in a 1–1 draw at home to Dundee United. He made twenty-nine appearances in his first season, including in the 1988 League Cup win over Aberdeen. McGregor's career subsequently stalled because of injuries, and he was forced to retire in 1992, joining the Rangers coaching staff soon after. He became the reserve team coach but left in 2003, replaced by John Brown.
