= Alex Gersbach =

Australian soccer player (born 1997)

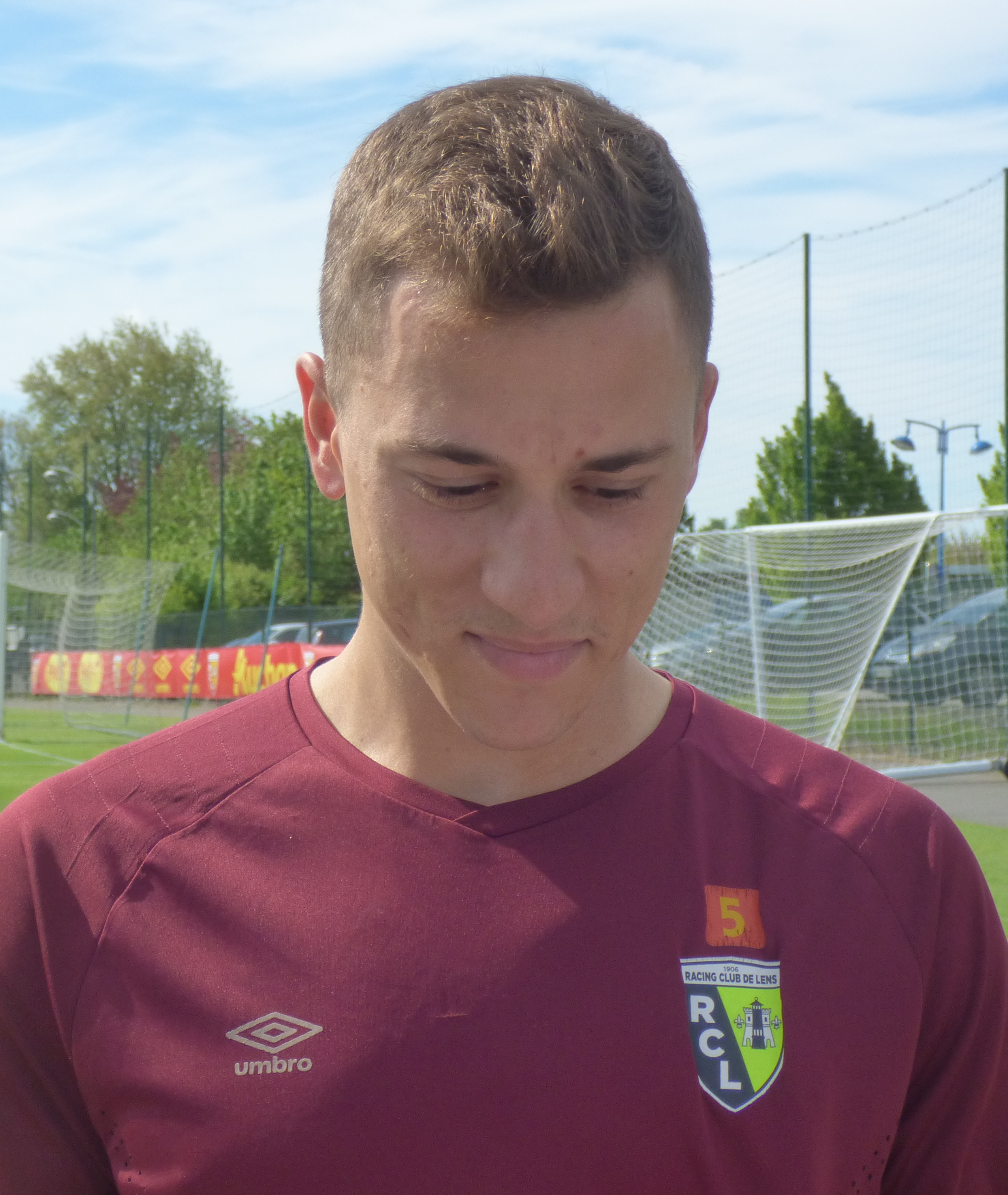
- Gerbach with Lens in 2018

Personal information
- Full name: Alexander Joseph Gersbach
- Date of birth: 8 May 1997 (age 29)
- Place of birth: Sutherland, New South Wales, Australia
- Height: 1.83 m (6 ft 0 in)
- Position: Left-back

Team information
- Current team: Western Sydney Wanderers
- Number: 3

Youth career
- Miranda Magpies
- Sutherland Sharks
- 2012: FNSW NTC
- 2012–2014: AIS

Senior career*
Years	Team	Apps	(Gls)
2013	AIS	16	(1)
2014–2016	Sydney FC	31	(0)
2016–2019	Rosenborg	37	(0)
2016–2018	Rosenborg 2	7	(1)
2018	→ Lens (loan)	12	(0)
2019	NAC Breda	7	(0)
2019–2021	AGF	8	(0)
2021–2023	Grenoble	42	(0)
2023	Colorado Rapids	3	(0)
2023	Colorado Rapids 2	3	(0)
2024–2025	Kalmar FF	19	(0)
2025–	Western Sydney Wanderers	35	(2)

International career^{‡}
2012	Australia U17	9	(1)
2015	Australia U20	5	(0)
2016–2020	Australia U23	14	(0)
2016–2018	Australia	6	(0)
Medal record
Men's football
Representing Australia
AFC U-23 Asian Cup
Third place	2020 Thailand	U-23 Team
- * Club domestic league appearances and goals as of 21 November 2026 ‡ National team caps and goals as of 15 October 2018

Alexander Joseph Gersbach (/ˈɡɜːrzbæk/ GURZ-bak, German: [ˈɡɛʁsˌbax]; born 8 May 1997) is an Australian professional soccer player who plays as a left-back for A-League club Western Sydney Wanderers.

He made his debut for Australia in 2016, having previously played numerous times for the nation's youth teams.

== Early life ==
Born in Auburn, Sydney to a father of German descent and a mother of Greek descent, Gersbach grew up in Sutherland, in Sydney's South East. For the majority of his school years he attended St Patrick's College, Sutherland, before leaving for the Australian Institute of Sport in Canberra where he also attended Canberra High School. Gersbach played his youth soccer for the Miranda Magpies and Sutherland Sharks where he played as a striker.

== Club career ==
=== Sydney FC ===
On 20 July 2014, Sydney FC announced that they had signed Gersbach to a two-year deal. Alex was previously given the number 13 jersey, but later swapped with Christopher Naumoff for the number 16. Rated as one of Australia's most promising young footballers, he made his senior professional debut for the club at the age of 17 years and 3 months in the 2014 FFA Cup Round of 32 tie against Melbourne City FC at Morshead Park on 12 August 2014 which Sydney FC won 3–1 after extra time.

He made his A-League debut on 11 October 2014 against Melbourne City when he came on for Matthew Jurman after 69 minutes. He put in a promising performance as Sydney FC drew 1–1.

For the 2015–16 A-League season, Gersbach was given the number 3 jersey.

=== Rosenborg ===
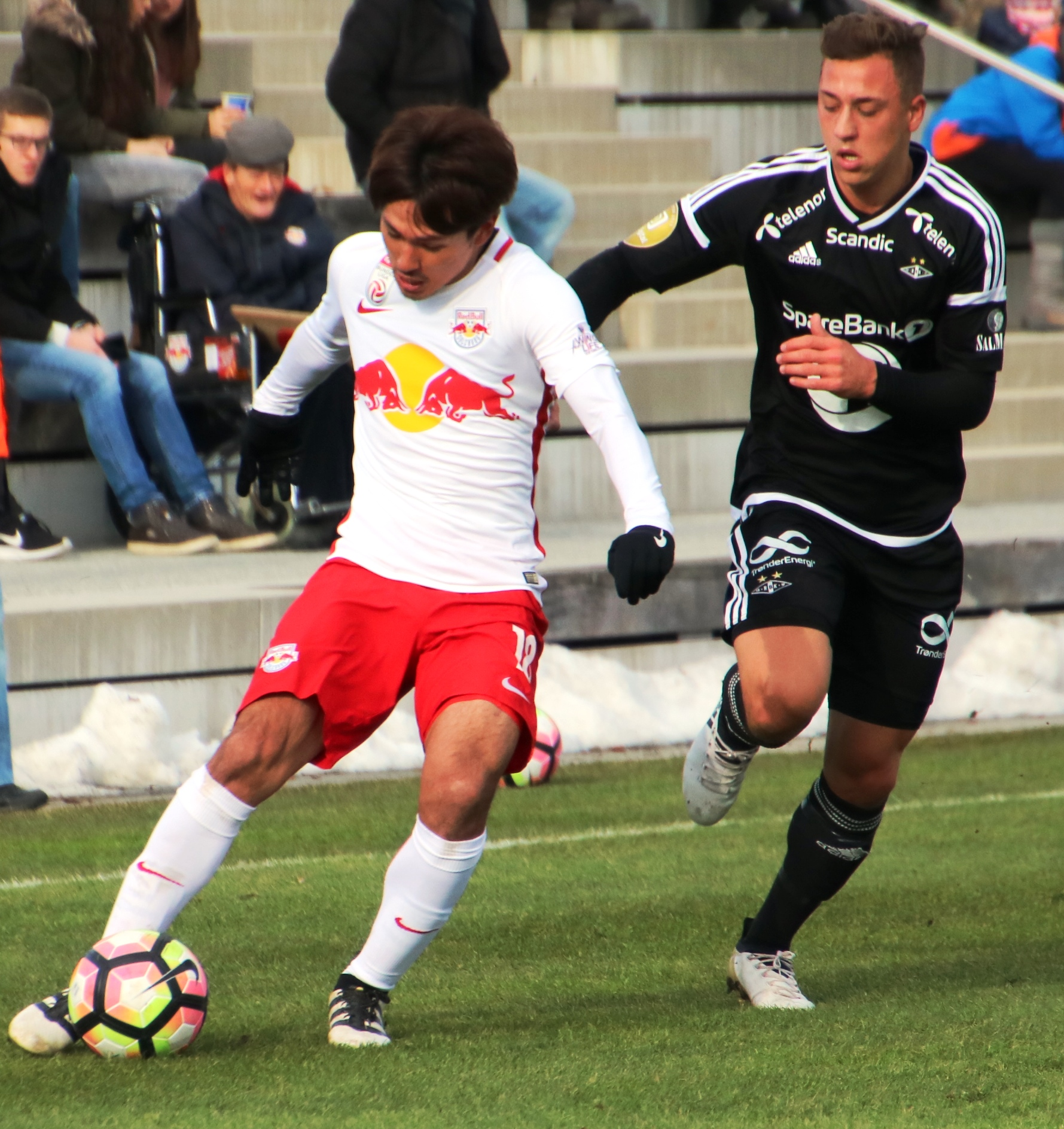
Gersbach playing for Rosenborg in 2017

On 31 January 2016, it was announced that Gersbach had signed with Norwegian club, Rosenborg BK of the Tippeligaen for a reported fee of $500,000. Gersbach made his Tippeligaen debut for Rosenborg on 19 March 2016 at home to Stromsgodset where he played a full 90 minutes in a 1–0 home victory.

==== Loan to Lens ====
On 22 January 2018, Lens announced the signing of Gersbach on a six-month loan deal, with the view to make it a permanent three-year deal at the end of his stint. Given the number 5 jersey, Gersbach made his debut in an unfamiliar centre-back role in a 1–0 loss to US Orléans.

==== NAC Breda ====
On 23 January 2019, NAC Breda announced the signing of Gersbach on a 2.5 year contract.

=== AGF ===
In July 2019, Gersbach moved to Denmark and joined AGF on a 3-year contract, also getting reunited with his former teammate from the national team Mustafa Amini.

=== Grenoble ===
On 31 August 2021, Gersbach secured a move to French Ligue 2 team Grenoble on a 2-year contract.

=== Colorado Rapids ===
After playing two seasons for Grenoble, Gersbach joined Major League Soccer team Colorado Rapids on 30 January 2023 for a reported fee of €300.000. Gersbach signed a three-year contract with a club-held option for the 2026 MLS season and occupies an international roster spot. Gersbach made his debut for the Rapids starting in a 4–0 defeat to Seattle Sounders FC on 26 February 2023.

=== Kalmar FF ===
On 21 March 2024, Gersbach signed for Kalmar FF on 1.5 year long contract.

=== Western Sydney Wanderers ===
On 15 January 2025, it was announced that Gersbach had returned to Australia, signing for the Western Sydney Wanderers on a two and a half year deal. This was a controversial move as he previously played for Sydney derby rivals, Sydney FC. On 13 April, he scored his first A-Leagues goal, which was the 500th goal of the 2024–25 A-League Men season.

== International career ==
On 25 September 2015, Gersbach was selected to play for the Young Socceroos to play in the 2016 AFC U-19 Championship qualification. In March 2016 Gersbach received his first call up to the senior team when he was named in the squad to face Tajikistan and Jordan in World Cup Qualifiers on 24 and 29 March.

On 4 June 2016, Gersbach made his first international appearance for Australia, coming on for Brad Smith against Greece in the 82nd minute and later setting up Mathew Leckie's last second winner.

== Career statistics ==
=== Club ===
As of 30 January 2023

Appearances and goals by club, season and competition
Club	Season	League			Cup		Continental		Total	
Club	Season	Division	Apps	Goals	Apps	Goals	Apps	Goals	Apps	Goals
Australian Institute of Sport	2013	National Premier Leagues	16	1	0	0	0	0	16	1
Sydney FC	2014–15	A-League	21	0	2	0	0	0	23	0
Sydney FC	2015–16	A-League	10	0	0	0	0	0	10	0
Sydney FC	Sydney total		31	0	2	0	0	0	33	0
Rosenborg	2016	Eliteserien	19	0	5	0	3	0	27	0
Rosenborg	2017	Eliteserien	15	0	4	0	5	0	24	0
Rosenborg	2018	Eliteserien	3	0	1	0	3	0	7	0
Rosenborg	Rosenborg total		37	0	10	0	11	0	58	0
Rosenborg 2	2016	Norwegian Second Division	2	0	0	0	0	0	2	0
Rosenborg 2	2017	Norwegian Third Division	3	0	0	0	0	0	3	0
Rosenborg 2	2018	Norwegian Third Division	2	1	0	0	0	0	2	1
Rosenborg 2	Total		7	1	0	0	0	0	7	1
RC Lens (loan)	2017–18	Ligue 2	12	0	2	0	0	0	14	0
NAC Breda	2018–19	Eredivisie	7	0	0	0	0	0	7	0
AGF	2019–20	Danish Superliga	4	0	3	2	0	0	7	2
AGF	2020–21	Danish Superliga	3	0	3	1	0	0	6	1
AGF	2021–22	Danish Superliga	1	0	0	0	2	0	3	0
AGF	AGF total		8	0	6	3	2	0	16	3
Grenoble	2021–22	Ligue 2	25	0	1	0	0	0	26	0
Grenoble	2022–23	Ligue 2	17	0	2	0	0	0	19	0
Grenoble	Grenoble total		32	0	3	0	0	0	35	0
Colorado Rapids	2023	MLS	3	0	2	0	0	0	5	0
Colorado Rapids 2 (loan)	2023	MLS Next Pro	3	0	0	0	0	0	3	0
Career total			149	1	25	3	13	0	187	4

=== International ===
As of 30 December 2018

Australia
Year	Apps	Goals
2016	2	0
2017	2	0
2018	2	0
Total	6	0

== Honours ==
=== Player ===
Rosenborg

- Eliteserien: 2016, 2017, 2018
- Norwegian Football Cup: 2016, 2018
- Mesterfinalen: 2017

Australia U-23

- AFC U-23 Asian Cup: 3rd place 2020

=== Individual ===
- Harry Kewell Medal: 2017

== See also ==
- List of foreign Norwegian Premier League players
- List of Sydney FC players
