= 1996–97 Portsmouth F.C. season =

Portsmouth
1996–97 season
- Chairman: Terry Venables
- Manager: Terry Fenwick
- Stadium: Fratton Park
- First Division: 1st
- FA Cup: Quarter finals
- League Cup: Second round
- Top goalscorer: League: Lee Bradbury (15); All: Lee Bradbury (17)
- Highest home attendance: 12,841 (vs. Manchester City, 16 November 1996)
- Lowest home attendance: 5,579 (vs. Southend United, 27 August 1996)
- Average home league attendance: 8,857

During the 1996–97 English football season, Portsmouth F.C. competed in the Football League First Division.

== Season summary ==
In the summer of 1996, Terry Venables arrived at Portsmouth as a consultant, later taking over as chairman after buying the club for £1. The team enjoyed a run to the FA Cup quarter-finals, beating Premiership side Leeds United en route, After the season, the Fratton End was fully demolished to make way for an all-new replacement stand.

== Final league table ==
Pos	Team	Pld	W	D	L	GF	GA	GD	Pts	Qualification or relegation
5	Sheffield United	46	20	13	13	75	52	+23	73	Qualification for the First Division play-offs
6	Crystal Palace (O, P)	46	19	14	13	78	48	+30	71	Qualification for the First Division play-offs
7	Portsmouth	46	20	8	18	59	53	+6	68	
8	Port Vale	46	17	16	13	58	55	+3	67	
9	Queens Park Rangers	46	18	12	16	64	60	+4	66	

Rules for classification: 1) Points; 2) Goals scored; 3) Goal difference
(O) Play-off winners; (P) Promoted

== Results ==
Portsmouth's score comes first

=== Legend ===
Win	Draw	Loss

=== Football League First Division ===
Date	Opponent	Venue	Result	Attendance	Scorers
17 August 1996	Bradford City	A	1–3	10,007	Hall
23 August 1996	Queens Park Rangers	H	1–2	7,501	Igoe
27 August 1996	Southend United	H	1–0	5,579	Russell
31 August 1996	Grimsby Town	A	1–0	4,747	Rees
7 September 1996	Port Vale	H	1–1	8,099	Russell
11 September 1996	Swindon Town	A	1–0	8,685	McLoughlin
14 September 1996	Bolton Wanderers	A	0–2	14,248	
21 September 1996	Norwich City	H	0–1	7,511	
28 September 1996	Oxford United	A	0–2	7,626	
1 October 1996	Crystal Palace	H	2–2	7,212	Hall, Bradbury
4 October 1996	Tranmere Rovers	A	3–4	5,001	Bradbury, McLoughlin (pen), Perrett
12 October 1996	Charlton Athletic	H	2–0	6,641	Durnin, Bradbury
15 October 1996	Wolverhampton Wanderers	H	0–2	7,411	
19 October 1996	Ipswich Town	A	1–1	10,514	McLoughlin (pen)
26 October 1996	Stoke City	A	1–3	10,259	Bradbury
29 October 1996	Birmingham City	H	1–1	6,334	Bradbury
2 November 1996	West Bromwich Albion	H	4–0	7,354	Bradbury, Simpson, Durnin, Turner
9 November 1996	Oldham Athletic	A	0–0	7,639	
16 November 1996	Manchester City	H	2–1	12,841	Bradbury, Simpson
23 November 1996	Barnsley	A	2–3	7,449	Durnin (pen), Bradbury
30 November 1996	Stoke City	H	1–0	7,749	Turner
7 December 1996	Sheffield United	A	0–1	16,333	
14 December 1996	Huddersfield Town	H	3–1	6,954	Simpson (pen), Svensson (2)
21 December 1996	Reading	A	0–0	8,520	
26 December 1996	Swindon Town	H	0–1	10,605	
28 December 1996	Port Vale	A	2–0	7,382	Hall, Svensson
1 January 1997	Norwich City	A	0–1	11,946	
11 January 1997	Bolton Wanderers	H	0–3	10,467	
18 January 1997	Crystal Palace	A	2–1	15,498	Bradbury, Thomson
28 January 1997	Oxford United	H	2–1	7,301	Hall, Svensson
1 February 1997	Oldham Athletic	H	1–0	9,135	Hall
8 February 1997	Birmingham City	A	3–0	15,897	Svensson, Bradbury, McLoughlin (pen)
22 February 1997	West Bromwich Albion	A	2–0	15,800	Hillier, Burton
1 March 1997	Sheffield United	H	1–1	12,715	Hall
5 March 1997	Manchester City	A	1–1	11,276	Simpson
15 March 1997	Huddersfield Town	A	3–1	10,512	Igoe, Hall (2)
22 March 1997	Queens Park Rangers	A	1–2	15,746	Bradbury
25 March 1997	Reading	H	1–0	9,248	Hall
29 March 1997	Bradford City	H	3–1	12,340	Bradbury, Hall, Svensson
31 March 1997	Southend United	A	1–2	6,107	Hall
5 April 1997	Grimsby Town	H	1–0	9,854	Carter
12 April 1997	Tranmere Rovers	H	1–3	12,004	Hillier
19 April 1997	Charlton Athletic	A	1–2	12,342	Hall
22 April 1997	Barnsley	H	4–2	8,328	McLoughlin (pen), Bradbury (3)
25 April 1997	Ipswich Town	H	0–1	12,101	
4 May 1997	Wolverhampton Wanderers	A	1–0	26,031	Hall

=== FA Cup ===
Round	Date	Opponent	Venue	Result	Attendance	Goalscorers
R3	4 January 1997	Wolverhampton Wanderers	A	2–1	23,626	McLoughlin, Robson
R4	25 January 1997	Reading	H	3–0	15,003	Hall, Bradbury, Hillier
R5	15 February 1997	Leeds United	A	3–2	35,604	Robson, Robson Robson
QF	9 March 1997	Chelsea	H	1–4	15,701	Burton

=== League Cup ===
Round	Date	Opponent	Venue	Result	Attendance	Goalscorers
R1 First Leg	20 August 1996	Leyton Orient	H	2–0	3,102	Burton (2)
R1 Second Leg	4 September 1996	Leyton Orient	A	0–1 (won 2–1 on agg)	3,177	
R2 First Leg	18 September 1996	Wimbledon	A	0–1	3,811	
R2 Second Leg	25 September 1996	Wimbledon	H	1–1	4,006	Carter

== Squad ==
Note: Flags indicate national team as defined under FIFA eligibility rules; some limited exceptions apply. Players may hold more than one non-FIFA nationality.

No.	Pos.	Nation	Player
—	GK	ENG	Aaron Flahavan
—	GK	ENG	Alan Knight
—	DF	ENG	Andy Awford
—	DF	ENG	Guy Butters
—	DF	ENG	Paul Cook (on loan from Swansea City)
—	MF	ENG	David Robson (Captain)
—	MF	ENG	Danny Hinshelwood
—	DF	ENG	Russell Perrett
—	DF	ENG	Robbie Pethick
—	DF	ENG	Lee Russell
—	DF	ENG	Andy Thomson
—	DF	ENG	Adrian Whitbread
—	MF	ENG	Martin Allen
—	MF	ENG	Jimmy Carter

No.	Pos.	Nation	Player
—	MF	ENG	John Durnin
—	MF	ENG	David Hillier
—	MF	ENG	Jamie Howell
—	MF	ENG	Sammy Igoe
—	MF	ENG	Fitzroy Simpson
—	MF	WAL	Jason Rees
—	MF	IRL	Alan McLoughlin
—	MF	NIR	Dave Waterman
—	MF	JAM	Paul Hall
—	FW	ENG	Lee Bradbury
—	FW	IRL	Andy Turner
—	FW	SWE	Mathias Svensson
—	FW	JAM	Deon Burton
