= 2015–16 Sydney FC season =

Sydney FC
2015–16 season
- Chairman: Scott Barlow
- Manager: Graham Arnold
- Stadium: Allianz Stadium, Sydney
- A-League: 7th
- FFA Cup: Round of 16
- AFC Champions League: Round of 16
- Top goalscorer: League: Filip Hološko (10 goals); All: Filip Hološko (10 goals)
- Highest home attendance: 40,539 vs Western Sydney Wanderers (24 October 2015)
- Lowest home attendance: 8,717 vs Perth Glory (11 April 2016)
- Average home league attendance: 16,071
| Home colours | Away colours |

The 2015–16 Sydney FC season was the club's eleventh season since its establishment in 2004. The club participated in the A-League for the eleventh time, the FFA Cup for the second time, as well as the AFC Champions League for the third time.

== Preview ==
=== Preseason ===
Sydney FC began the pre-season with a 7–0 win over Earlwood Wanderers. The club then announced the annual Macarthur Rams pre-season clash. The match took place on 30 July 2015, with Sydney FC cruising to a comfortable 5–1 victory. For both games, Sydney FC fielded mainly youth players and trialist's, of which included Matt Simon and Alex Mullen who would later go on to sign for the club. The club announced a third pre-season friendly against a team of Gold Coast Premier League All-stars for mid-August. However, this match would be ultimately be cancelled as the venue did not meet one of the criteria for Football Federation Australia sanctioned friendlies.

==== Transfers ====
Rumours throughout the end of the 2014–15 A-League season that Sydney FC had signed Newcastle Jets and Young Socceroo midfielder, Andrew Hoole were confirmed on 30 April 2015. Following the Grand Final loss to Melbourne Victory key members of the team were still weighing up their options for the season. Initially it was thought the services of Golden Boot winner, Marc Janko would be secured but after he left for Europe the day after the grand final to plan his wedding, rumours circled that he would not return. This was confirmed a week later with the club citing the number of games Janko would miss throughout the season as the A-League does not stop during FIFA breaks a factor in the decision. Janko expressed his displeasure of how things were handled through social media site, Twitter. Senegalese cousins Mickaël Tavares and Jacques Faty were quick to re-sign with club, extending their contracts from injury replacement players to full contracts. The club confirmed the signings of Tavares for two years on 21 May 2015 and one year for Faty on 27 May 2015. The club also announced a two-year deal for striker Shane Smeltz on the same day.

Sydney FC had many places to fill during the off-season, after announcing only eighteen retained players on 3 June 2015. Defender Zachary Anderson was reunited with mentor Graham Arnold, signing for the sky blues on 15 July 2015 for one year. This was quickly followed by the announcement of the highly anticipated foreign marquee and visa spots of Filip Hološko and Miloš Ninković. This appeared to spell the end of the 2014–15 Sydney FC Player of the Year Miloš Dimitrijević's time with club. However, with the departure of Nikola Petković to Westerlo there still remained one visa spot available, and on 28 July 2015, Sydney FC announced that he had re-signed for a further two years. With two days remaining before the commencement of the 2015 FFA Cup, Sydney FC announced the services of another former student of Arnold's (during his time with the Central Coast Mariners), when the club signed Matt Simon. The club then lost the services of talented Socceroos midfielder Terry Antonis when he was transferred to Greek powerhouse PAOK on 19 August 2015. On 25 August 2015, Sydney FC became the first club to utilise the "Mature Age Rookie" concept, signing Alex Mullen on a one-year deal. The club also announced the signing of veteran Sydney FC gloveman Ivan Necevski (who returned to club after a stint with New South Wales Premier League outfit Rockdale City Suns) alongside Sydney FC Youth captain, Jacob Tratt.

=== Season ===
Sydney FC began the regular season at home against Melbourne City. The visitors took an early lead in the 16th when debutant Wade Dekker capitalised on a defensive error by Jacques Faty. However, the Sky Blues bounced back in injury time of the first half after a clever ball from Brandon O'Neill allowed skipper Alex Brosque to set up international marquee Filip Hološko with the equaliser. Sydney FC created many chances in the second stanza but City goalkeeper Thomas Sørensen produced world-class saves time and time again to ensure the match would end 1–1.

Sydney FC then travelled to Hunter Stadium to face New South Wales rivals, Newcastle Jets. Newcastle had a goal disallowed in the first half for an offside infringement. With minutes remaining skipper Alex Brosque was denied by the woodwork, and the match looked destined for a draw. However, in the final minute of the game, Brosque came up with superb header from a corner kick. Sydney won the match 1–0. The win signified Sydney FC's unbeaten streak against Newcastle to eight games. The match also involved a sickening collision between Sydney FC striker Shane Smeltz and Newcastle Jets goalkeeper Mark Birighitti which left the shotstopper requiring hospitalisation and major dental surgery.

The first Sydney Derby of the year was hosted by Sydney FC at Allianz Stadium. The attendance of 40,539 was the second largest on record for the fixture and everyone in the stadium witnessed another pulsating clash. For the second match in a row, Sydney FC's opponent had a goal disallowed for an offside infringement in the first half and also for the second match in a row, Sydney FC scored in the dying minutes to win 1–0. Serbian international Miloš Ninković latched onto a splendid through-ball from rookie central midfielder Brandon O'Neill to put the game to bed. Sydney FC extended its unbeaten derby streak to five matches.

Sydney FC travelled to Gosford, to play Central Coast Mariners at Central Coast Stadium, on 31 October. Shane Smeltz opened the scoring in the 34th minute after some clever work from Alex Brosque, sweeping it home from close range. Mariners striker Roy O'Donovan then equalised a minute later with an easy tap-in from close range. A few minutes later, O'Donovan was through on goal, and attempted to round Sydney keeper Vedran Janjetovic before being taken down and going to ground. However, the referee did not award a penalty. Three minutes before the interval, Mariners midfielder Nick Fitzgerald was sent off for a second yellow card, swinging the game in Sydney's favour. After a lengthy stalemate, Mariners all-time top goalscorer and new Sydney FC signing Matt Simon scored after a marauding run from Filip Hološko, who unselfishly laid the ball off to Simon. Six minutes later, Simon scored his second goal after a smart run from Mickaël Tavares, and thus, the game ended 3–1, to Sydney. Sydney remained on top of the A-League ladder as the only unbeaten team remaining in the competition.

== Players ==
=== Squad ===
Note: Flags indicate national team as defined under FIFA eligibility rules; some limited exceptions apply. Players may hold more than one non-FIFA nationality.

| No. | Pos. | Nation | Player |
|---|---|---|---|
| 1 | GK | AUS | Vedran Janjetović |
| 2 | DF | AUS | Sebastian Ryall |
| 4 | DF | AUS | Zachary Anderson |
| 5 | DF | AUS | Matthew Jurman |
| 6 | FW | AUS | Robert Stambolziev |
| 7 | MF | AUS | Andrew Hoole |
| 8 | MF | SRB | Miloš Dimitrijević |
| 9 | FW | NZL | Shane Smeltz (vice-captain) |
| 10 | MF | SRB | Miloš Ninković |
| 11 | MF | AUS | Chris Naumoff |
| 12 | DF | AUS | Jacob Tratt |
| 13 | MF | AUS | Brandon O'Neill |
| 14 | FW | AUS | Alex Brosque (captain) |

| No. | Pos. | Nation | Player |
|---|---|---|---|
| 16 | DF | AUS | Riley Woodcock |
| 17 | MF | AUS | David Carney |
| 18 | FW | AUS | Matt Simon |
| 19 | DF | SEN | Jacques Faty (vice-captain) |
| 20 | GK | AUS | Ivan Necevski |
| 21 | FW | SVK | Filip Hološko |
| 22 | MF | IRQ | Ali Abbas |
| 23 | MF | AUS | Rhyan Grant |
| 24 | FW | AUS | George Blackwood |
| 25 | DF | AUS | Aaron Calver |
| 27 | MF | SEN | Mickaël Tavares |
| 29 | MF | AUS | Alex Mullen |
| 30 | GK | AUS | Anthony Bouzanis |

=== From youth squad ===
| N | Pos. | Nat. | Name | Age | Notes |
|---|---|---|---|---|---|
| 24 | FW | (Australia) | George Blackwood | 18 | |
| 30 | GK | (Australia) | Anthony Bouzanis | 19 | |
| 12 | DF | (Australia) | Jacob Tratt | 20 | |

=== Transfers in ===
| No. | Pos. | Nat. | Name | Age | Moving from | Type | Transfer window | Ends | Transfer fee | Source |
|---|---|---|---|---|---|---|---|---|---|---|
| 7 | MF | (Australia) | Andrew Hoole | 21 | Newcastle Jets | Transfer | Pre-season | 2017 | Free | |
| 13 | MF | (Australia) | Brandon O'Neill | 21 | Free agent | Transfer | Pre-season | 2017 | Free | |
| 16 | DF | (Australia) | Riley Woodcock | 20 | Perth Glory | Transfer | Pre-season | 2016 | Free | |
| 4 | DF | (Australia) | Zachary Anderson | 24 | Central Coast Mariners | Transfer | Pre-season | 2016 | Free | |
| 10 | MF | (Serbia) | Miloš Ninković | 30 | Free agent | Transfer | Pre-season | 2017 | Free | |
| 21 | FW | (Slovakia) | Filip Hološko | 31 | Free agent | Transfer | Pre-season | 2017 | Free | |
| 18 | FW | (Australia) | Matt Simon | 29 | Central Coast Mariners | Transfer | Pre-season | 2017 | Free | |
| 29 | MF | (Australia) | Alex Mullen | 23 | (United States) Mars Hill University | Transfer | Pre-season | 2016 | Free | |
| 20 | GK | (Australia) | Ivan Necevski | 35 | Rockdale City Suns | Transfer | Pre-season | 2016 | Free | |
| 17 | MF | (Australia) | David Carney | 32 | Free agent | Transfer | Round 18 | 2017 | Free | |

=== Transfers out ===
| No. | Pos. | Nat. | Name | Age | Moving to | Type | Transfer window | Transfer fee | Source |
|---|---|---|---|---|---|---|---|---|---|
| 21 | FW | (Austria) | Marc Janko | 31 | | End of Contract | Pre-season | Free | |
| 1 | GK | (Australia) | Ivan Necevski | 35 | | End of Contract | Pre-season | Free | |
| 3 | DF | (Australia) | Saša Ognenovski | 36 | | End of Contract | Pre-season | Free | |
| 18 | MF | (Australia) | Peter Triantis | 23 | | End of Contract | Pre-season | Free | |
| 19 | MF | (Australia) | Nick Carle | 33 | | End of Contract | Pre-season | Free | |
| 7 | FW | (Australia) | Corey Gameiro | 22 | | End of Contract | Pre-season | Free | |
| 12 | MF | (Australia) | Hagi Gligor | 20 | | End of Contract | Pre-season | Free | |
| 11 | FW | (Australia) | Bernie Ibini | 22 | Shanghai SIPG (China) | End of Loan | Pre-season | Free | |
| 6 | DF | (Serbia) | Nikola Petković | 29 | Westerlo (Belgium) | Transfer | Pre-season | Undisclosed | |
| 17 | MF | (Australia) | Terry Antonis | 21 | PAOK (Greece) | Transfer | Pre-season | $500,000 | |
| 3 | DF | (Australia) | Alex Gersbach | 18 | Rosenborg (Norway) | Transfer | Round 18 | Undisclosed | |

== Technical staff ==
| Position | Name |
|---|---|
| Manager | (Australia) Graham Arnold |
| Assistant Manager | (Australia) Steve Corica |
| Youth Team Manager | (Australia) Robbie Stanton |
| Goalkeeping Coach | (Australia) John Crawley |
| Strength & Conditioning Coach | (Australia) Andrew Clark |
| Physiotherapist | (Australia) Stan Ivancic |

== Statistics ==
=== Squad statistics ===
| N | Pos. | Nat. | Name | Total | | | | | A-League | | | | | FFA Cup | | | | | AFC Champions League |
| N | Pos. | Nat. | Name | Apps | Goals | Yellow card | Second yellow card | Red card | Apps | Goals | Yellow card | Second yellow card | Red card | Apps | Goals | Yellow card | Second yellow card | Red card | Apps | Goals | Yellow card | Second yellow card | Red card |
|---|---|---|---|---|---|---|---|---|---|---|---|---|---|---|---|---|---|---|---|---|---|---|---|
| 1 | GK | (Australia) | Vedran Janjetović | 37 | 0 | 1 | 0 | 0 | 27+0 | 0 | 0 | 0 | 0 | 2+0 | 0 | 0 | 0 | 0 | 8+0 | 0 | 1 | 0 | 0 |
| 2 | DF | (Australia) | Sebastian Ryall | 30 | 0 | 7 | 0 | 0 | 23+0 | 0 | 5 | 0 | 0 | 2+0 | 0 | 1 | 0 | 0 | 5+0 | 0 | 1 | 0 | 0 |
| 4 | DF | (Australia) | Zachary Anderson | 9 | 0 | 0 | 0 | 1 | 4+0 | 0 | 0 | 0 | 0 | 0+0 | 0 | 0 | 0 | 0 | 5+0 | 0 | 0 | 0 | 1 |
| 5 | DF | (Australia) | Matthew Jurman | 34 | 0 | 4 | 0 | 0 | 25+0 | 0 | 3 | 0 | 0 | 2+0 | 0 | 0 | 0 | 0 | 7+0 | 0 | 1 | 0 | 0 |
| 6 | FW | (Australia) | Robert Stambolziev | 15 | 1 | 2 | 0 | 0 | 1+7 | 0 | 2 | 0 | 0 | 2+0 | 0 | 0 | 0 | 0 | 1+4 | 1 | 0 | 0 | 0 |
| 7 | MF | (Australia) | Andrew Hoole | 23 | 0 | 5 | 0 | 0 | 6+9 | 0 | 4 | 0 | 0 | 2+0 | 0 | 0 | 0 | 0 | 4+2 | 0 | 1 | 0 | 0 |
| 8 | MF | (Serbia) | Miloš Dimitrijević | 33 | 1 | 5 | 0 | 0 | 18+7 | 0 | 5 | 0 | 0 | 0+0 | 0 | 0 | 0 | 0 | 7+1 | 1 | 0 | 0 | 0 |
| 9 | FW | (Australia) | Shane Smeltz | 30 | 5 | 3 | 0 | 0 | 12+10 | 4 | 2 | 0 | 0 | 2+0 | 1 | 0 | 0 | 0 | 3+3 | 0 | 1 | 0 | 0 |
| 10 | MF | (Serbia) | Miloš Ninković | 33 | 5 | 5 | 0 | 0 | 23+2 | 4 | 5 | 0 | 0 | 0+1 | 0 | 0 | 0 | 0 | 5+2 | 1 | 0 | 0 | 0 |
| 11 | MF | (Australia) | Chris Naumoff | 18 | 1 | 0 | 0 | 0 | 8+2 | 0 | 0 | 0 | 0 | 2+0 | 0 | 0 | 0 | 0 | 4+2 | 1 | 0 | 0 | 0 |
| 12 | DF | (Australia) | Jacob Tratt | 0 | 0 | 0 | 0 | 0 | 0+0 | 0 | 0 | 0 | 0 | 0+0 | 0 | 0 | 0 | 0 | 0+0 | 0 | 0 | 0 | 0 |
| 13 | MF | (Australia) | Brandon O'Neill | 30 | 1 | 6 | 0 | 0 | 16+5 | 0 | 4 | 0 | 0 | 2+0 | 0 | 1 | 0 | 0 | 6+1 | 1 | 1 | 0 | 0 |
| 14 | FW | (Australia) | Alex Brosque | 15 | 5 | 3 | 0 | 0 | 13+0 | 5 | 3 | 0 | 0 | 0+1 | 0 | 0 | 0 | 0 | 0+1 | 0 | 0 | 0 | 0 |
| 16 | DF | (Australia) | Riley Woodcock | 6 | 0 | 0 | 0 | 0 | 1+0 | 0 | 0 | 0 | 0 | 2+0 | 0 | 0 | 0 | 0 | 3+0 | 0 | 0 | 0 | 0 |
| 17 | MF | (Australia) | David Carney | 13 | 3 | 5 | 0 | 0 | 7+1 | 2 | 3 | 0 | 0 | 0+0 | 0 | 0 | 0 | 0 | 5+0 | 1 | 2 | 0 | 0 |
| 18 | FW | (Australia) | Matt Simon | 27 | 3 | 10 | 0 | 0 | 9+11 | 3 | 6 | 0 | 0 | 0+2 | 0 | 1 | 0 | 0 | 5+0 | 0 | 3 | 0 | 0 |
| 19 | DF | (Senegal) | Jacques Faty | 20 | 1 | 3 | 0 | 1 | 17+3 | 1 | 3 | 0 | 1 | 0+0 | 0 | 0 | 0 | 0 | 0+0 | 0 | 0 | 0 | 0 |
| 20 | GK | (Australia) | Ivan Necevski | 0 | 0 | 0 | 0 | 0 | 0+0 | 0 | 0 | 0 | 0 | 0+0 | 0 | 0 | 0 | 0 | 0+0 | 0 | 0 | 0 | 0 |
| 21 | FW | (Slovakia) | Filip Hološko | 24 | 10 | 5 | 1 | 0 | 23+1 | 10 | 5 | 1 | 0 | 0+0 | 0 | 0 | 0 | 0 | 0+0 | 0 | 0 | 0 | 0 |
| 22 | MF | (Iraq) | Ali Abbas | 13 | 2 | 2 | 0 | 0 | 2+7 | 2 | 2 | 0 | 0 | 0+0 | 0 | 0 | 0 | 0 | 3+1 | 0 | 0 | 0 | 0 |
| 23 | MF | (Australia) | Rhyan Grant | 33 | 2 | 6 | 0 | 0 | 24+0 | 0 | 5 | 0 | 0 | 2+0 | 1 | 0 | 0 | 0 | 7+0 | 1 | 1 | 0 | 0 |
| 24 | FW | (Australia) | George Blackwood | 20 | 1 | 1 | 0 | 0 | 8+6 | 1 | 1 | 0 | 0 | 0+0 | 0 | 0 | 0 | 0 | 4+2 | 0 | 0 | 0 | 0 |
| 25 | DF | (Australia) | Aaron Calver | 9 | 0 | 2 | 0 | 0 | 4+0 | 0 | 1 | 0 | 0 | 2+0 | 0 | 0 | 0 | 0 | 3+0 | 0 | 1 | 0 | 0 |
| 26 | FW | (Australia) | Max Burgess | 1 | 1 | 0 | 0 | 0 | 0+0 | 0 | 0 | 0 | 0 | 0+1 | 1 | 0 | 0 | 0 | 0+0 | 0 | 0 | 0 | 0 |
| 27 | MF | (Senegal) | Mickaël Tavares | 26 | 1 | 4 | 0 | 0 | 17+5 | 1 | 4 | 0 | 0 | 0+1 | 0 | 0 | 0 | 0 | 3+0 | 0 | 0 | 0 | 0 |
| 29 | MF | (Australia) | Alex Mullen | 3 | 0 | 0 | 0 | 0 | 1+0 | 0 | 0 | 0 | 0 | 0+0 | 0 | 0 | 0 | 0 | 0+2 | 0 | 0 | 0 | 0 |
| 30 | GK | (Australia) | Anthony Bouzanis | 0 | 0 | 0 | 0 | 0 | 0+0 | 0 | 0 | 0 | 0 | 0+0 | 0 | 0 | 0 | 0 | 0+0 | 0 | 0 | 0 | 0 |
Players no longer at the club:
| 3 | DF | (Australia) | Alex Gersbach | 10 | 0 | 1 | 0 | 1 | 8+2 | 0 | 1 | 0 | 1 | 0+0 | 0 | 0 | 0 | 0 | 0+0 | 0 | 0 | 0 | 0 |

- Last updated: 25 May 2016
- Source: au.soccerway.com
- (yellow card) = Number of bookings; (second yellow card) = Number of sending offs after a second yellow card; (red card) = Number of sending offs by a direct red card.

== Preseason and friendlies ==
| 22 July 2015 Johnny Warren Community Challenge | Earlwood Wanderers (Australia) | 0–7 | (Australia) Sydney FC | Sydney, Australia |
| 19:30 AEST | | Report | Smeltz 8', 29'; Calver 27'; A. Mullen 38'; Naumoff 60', 66'; Lokoli-Ngoy 64' | Stadium: Leichhardt Oval; Attendance: 350; Referee: Chris Young |

| 30 July 2015 Friendly | Macarthur Rams (Australia) | 1–5 | (Australia) Sydney FC | Sydney, Australia |
| 19:30 AEST | Kadric 78' | Report | Simon 7'; Naumoff 23'; Antonis 32'; Burgess 51'; Lokoli-Ngoy 66' | Stadium: Campbelltown Stadium |

| 13 August 2015 Gold Coast Cabs Challenge | Gold Coast All-Stars (Australia) | Cancelled | (Australia) Sydney FC | Gold Coast, Australia |
| 19:00 AEST | | Source; Cancellation | | Stadium: Pizzey Park |

| 19 August 2015 Friendly | Belconnen United (Australia) | 0–3 | (Australia) Sydney FC | Canberra, Australia |
| 19:00 AEST | | Report | Simon 72'; Tratt 85'; Hoole 88' | Stadium: McKellar Park; Attendance: 1,852; Referee: Ben Williams |

| 15 September 2015 Friendly | South Coast Wolves (Australia) | 0–4 | (Australia) Sydney FC | Wollongong, Australia |
| 19:00 AEST | | Report | Hoole 5'; Smeltz 55', 80'; Hološko 82' | Stadium: WIN Stadium; Referee: Adrian Arndt |

| 18 September 2015 Friendly | Sydney FC (Australia) | 1–3 | (New Zealand) Wellington Phoenix | Wollongong, Australia |
| 19:45 AEST | Hološko 67' | Report | Krishna 32'; Powell 37', 38' | Stadium: WIN Stadium; Attendance: 2,874; Referee: Strebre Delovski |

| 1 October 2015 Friendly | Sydney FC (Australia) | 0–2 | (Australia) Adelaide United | Sydney, Australia |
| 15:30 AEST | | Report | Djite 67', 87' | Stadium: Leichhardt Oval |

== Competitions ==
=== Overview ===
| Competition | First match | Last match | Starting round | Final position | Record | | | | | | | |
| Competition | First match | Last match | Starting round | Final position | Pld | W | D | L | GF | GA | GD | Win % |
|---|---|---|---|---|---|---|---|---|---|---|---|---|
| A-League | 10 October 2015 | 10 April 2016 | Matchday 1 | 7th | 27 | 8 | 10 | 9 | 36 | 36 | +0 | 29.63 |
| FFA Cup | 4 August 2015 | 7 November 2015 | Round of 32 | Round of 16 | 2 | 1 | 0 | 1 | 3 | 2 | +1 | 50.00 |
| AFC Champions League | 24 February 2016 | 24 May 2016 | Group stage | Round of 16 | 8 | 3 | 3 | 2 | 7 | 7 | +0 | 37.50 |
| Total | | | | | 37 | 12 | 13 | 12 | 46 | 45 | +1 | 32.43 |

Source: Competitions

=== A-League ===
==== League table ====
| Pos | Team | Pld | W | D | L | GF | GA | GD | Pts | Qualification |
|---|---|---|---|---|---|---|---|---|---|---|
| 1 | Adelaide United (C) | 27 | 14 | 7 | 6 | 45 | 28 | +17 | 49 | Qualification for 2017 AFC Champions League group stage and Finals series |
| 2 | Western Sydney Wanderers | 27 | 14 | 6 | 7 | 44 | 33 | +11 | 48 | Qualification for 2017 AFC Champions League group stage and Finals series |
| 3 | Brisbane Roar | 27 | 14 | 6 | 7 | 49 | 40 | +9 | 48 | Qualification for 2017 AFC Champions League second preliminary round and Finals series |
| 4 | Melbourne City | 27 | 13 | 5 | 9 | 63 | 44 | +19 | 44 | Qualification for Finals series |
| 5 | Perth Glory | 27 | 13 | 4 | 10 | 49 | 42 | +7 | 43 | Qualification for Finals series |
| 6 | Melbourne Victory | 27 | 11 | 8 | 8 | 40 | 33 | +7 | 41 | Qualification for Finals series |
| 7 | Sydney FC | 27 | 8 | 10 | 9 | 36 | 36 | 0 | 34 | |
| 8 | Newcastle Jets | 27 | 8 | 6 | 13 | 28 | 41 | −13 | 30 | |
| 9 | Wellington Phoenix (Note: Wellington Phoenix cannot qualify for the AFC Champions League as they are not recognised as an AFC club.) | 27 | 7 | 4 | 16 | 34 | 54 | −20 | 25 | |
| 10 | Central Coast Mariners | 27 | 3 | 4 | 20 | 33 | 70 | −37 | 13 | |

Source: A-Leagues
Rules for classification: 1) points; 2) goal difference; 3) number of goals scored.
(C) Champions

==== Results summary ====
| Overall | | | | | | | | Home | | | | | | Away | | | | | |
| Pld | W | D | L | GF | GA | GD | Pts | W | D | L | GF | GA | GD | W | D | L | GF | GA | GD |
|---|---|---|---|---|---|---|---|---|---|---|---|---|---|---|---|---|---|---|---|
| 27 | 8 | 10 | 9 | 36 | 36 | 0 | 34 | 5 | 4 | 5 | 19 | 17 | +2 | 3 | 6 | 4 | 17 | 19 | −2 |

Last updated: 10 April 2016.
Source: ultimatealeague.com

==== Results by round ====
| Round | 1 | 2 | 3 | 4 | 5 | 6 | 7 | 8 | 9 | 10 | 11 | 12 | 13 | 14 | 15 | 16 | 17 | 18 | 19 | 20 | 21 | 22 | 23 | 24 | 25 | 26 | 27 |
|---|---|---|---|---|---|---|---|---|---|---|---|---|---|---|---|---|---|---|---|---|---|---|---|---|---|---|---|
| Ground | H | A | H | A | H | H | A | H | H | A | A | H | A | H | A | A | H | A | H | H | A | A | H | A | A | H | H |
| Result | D | W | W | W | D | L | D | D | W | L | D | W | D | W | W | L | L | D | L | D | D | L | L | D | L | L | W |
| Position | 4 | 3 | 1 | 1 | 1 | 2 | 4 | 4 | 3 | 5 | 4 | 4 | 4 | 4 | 3 | 5 | 5 | 5 | 6 | 6 | 6 | 7 | 7 | 7 | 7 | 7 | 7 |

Source: ultimatealeague.com
A = Away; H = Home; W = Win; D = Draw; L = Loss

==== Matches ====
| 10 October 2015 1 | Sydney FC | 1–1 | Melbourne City | Sydney |
| 19:30 AEDT | Hološko 45+3' | Report | Dekker 16' | Stadium: Allianz Stadium; Attendance: 17,051; Referee: Ben Williams |

| 17 October 2015 2 | Newcastle Jets | 0–1 | Sydney FC | Newcastle |
| 17:15 AEDT | | Report | Brosque 89' | Stadium: Hunter Stadium; Attendance: 12,173; Referee: Peter Green |

| 24 October 2015 3 | Sydney FC | 1–0 | Western Sydney Wanderers | Sydney |
| 19:30 AEDT | Ninković 88' | Report | | Stadium: Allianz Stadium; Attendance: 40,539; Referee: Ben Williams |

| 31 October 2015 4 | Central Coast Mariners | 1–3 | Sydney FC | Gosford |
| 17:15 AEDT | O'Donovan 35'; Fitzgerald (yellow card) 40' (yellow-red card) 42' | Report | Smeltz 34'; Simon 82', 88' | Stadium: Central Coast Stadium; Attendance: 10,030; Referee: Adam Fielding |

| 6 November 2015 5 | Sydney FC | 0–0 | Brisbane Roar | Sydney |
| 19:40 AEDT | | Report | | Stadium: Allianz Stadium; Attendance: 12,857; Referee: Strebre Delovski |

| 14 November 2015 6 | Sydney FC | 2–4 | Melbourne Victory | Sydney |
| 19:30 AEDT | Hološko 5'; Brosque 20' | Report | Berisha 9', 90+2'; Finkler 28'; Barbarouses 68' | Stadium: Allianz Stadium; Attendance: 15,947; Referee: Chris Beath |

| 21 November 2015 7 | Perth Glory | 0–0 | Sydney FC | Perth |
| 16:30 AWST | | Report | | Stadium: nib Stadium; Attendance: 6,976; Referee: Jarred Gillett |

| 26 November 2015 8 | Sydney FC | 0–0 | Wellington Phoenix | Sydney |
| 20:00 AEDT | | Report | | Stadium: Allianz Stadium; Attendance: 9,253; Referee: Chris Beath |

| 4 December 2015 9 | Sydney FC | 1–0 | Newcastle Jets | Sydney |
| 19:40 AEDT | Brosque 57' | Report | | Stadium: Allianz Stadium; Attendance: 9,155; Referee: Shaun Evans |

| 11 December 2015 10 | Adelaide United | 2–1 | Sydney FC | Adelaide |
| 19:10 ACDT | Jeggo 62'; Carrusca 90+4' (pen.) | Report | Gersbach (red card) 28'; Hološko 70' | Stadium: Coopers Stadium; Attendance: 9,076; Referee: Strebre Delovski |

| 19 December 2015 11 | Wellington Phoenix | 1–1 | Sydney FC | Wellington |
| 19:15 NZDT | Krishna 89' (pen.) | Report | Hološko 84' | Stadium: Westpac Stadium; Attendance: 10,027; Referee: Peter Green |

| 26 December 2015 12 | Sydney FC | 4–1 | Central Coast Mariners | Sydney |
| 19:30 AEDT | Brosque 12', 24' (pen.); Tavares 30' (pen.); McGing 84' (o.g.) | Report | Izzo (yellow card) 23' (yellow-red card) 27'; Ascroft 38' | Stadium: Allianz Stadium; Attendance: 12,648; Referee: Ben Williams |

| 2 January 2016 13 | Melbourne City | 2–2 | Sydney FC | Melbourne |
| 19:30 AEDT | Hughes 37'; Fornaroli 60' | Report | Ninković 53', 78' | Stadium: AAMI Park; Attendance: 10,140; Referee: Strebre Delovski |

| 9 January 2016 14 | Sydney FC | 2–0 | Newcastle Jets | Sydney |
| 17:15 AEDT | Hološko 15'; Abbas 80' | Report | | Stadium: ANZ Stadium; Attendance: 15,127; Referee: Jonathan Barreiro |

| 16 January 2016 15 | Western Sydney Wanderers | 1–2 | Sydney FC | Parramatta |
| 19:30 AEDT | Vidošić 58' | Report | Faty 22'; Smeltz 90' | Stadium: Pirtek Stadium; Attendance: 19,627; Referee: Strebre Delovski |

| 26 January 2016 16 | Melbourne Victory | 1–0 | Sydney FC | Melbourne |
| 19:30 AEDT | Jurman 79' (o.g.) | Report | | Stadium: Etihad Stadium; Attendance: 30,493; Referee: Strebre Delovski |

| 30 January 2016 17 | Sydney FC | 1–3 | Brisbane Roar | Sydney |
| 19:30 AEDT | Corona 52' (o.g.) | Report | Maclaren 8', 76'; McKay 67' | Stadium: Allianz Stadium; Attendance: 12,548; Referee: Peter Green |

| 5 February 2016 18 | Adelaide United | 2–2 | Sydney FC | Adelaide |
| 19:10 ACDT | Cirio 2', 45' | Report | Simon 37'; Hološko 45+2' | Stadium: Coopers Stadium; Attendance: 11,785; Referee: Chris Beath |

| 13 February 2016 19 | Sydney FC | 1–2 | Perth Glory | Sydney |
| 17:15 AEDT | Smeltz 79' | Report | Keogh 23'; Harold 65' | Stadium: Allianz Stadium; Attendance: 11,559; Referee: Ben Williams |

| 20 February 2016 20 | Sydney FC | 1–1 | Western Sydney Wanderers | Sydney |
| 19:30 AEDT | Jamieson 36' (o.g.) | Report | Vidošić 13' | Stadium: Allianz Stadium; Attendance: 40,382; Referee: Jarred Gillett |

| 27 February 2016 21 | Melbourne Victory | 1–1 | Sydney FC | Melbourne |
| 19:30 AEDT | Barbarouses 46' | Report | Faty (red card) 64'; Carney 76' | Stadium: AAMI Park; Attendance: 20,112; Referee: Kris Griffiths-Jones |

| 5 March 2016 22 | Melbourne City | 3–0 | Sydney FC | Melbourne |
| 19:30 AEDT | Fornaroli 41', 71', 82' | Report | | Stadium: AAMI Park; Attendance: 8,584; Referee: Jarred Gillett |

| 12 March 2016 23 | Sydney FC | 1–3 | Wellington Phoenix | Sydney |
| 17:15 AEDT | Hološko 51' | Report | Powell 12'; Watson 13'; Bonevacia 37' | Stadium: Allianz Stadium; Attendance: 10,235; Referee: Takuto Okabe (Japan) |

| 19 March 2016 24 | Central Coast Mariners | 2–2 | Sydney FC | Gosford |
| 17:15 AEDT | O'Donovan 86'; Ascroft 90+1' | Report | Blackwood 11'; Smeltz 45' | Stadium: Central Coast Stadium; Attendance: 6,383; Referee: Koichiro Fukushima (Japan) |

| 26 March 2016 25 | Brisbane Roar | 3–2 | Sydney FC | Brisbane |
| 18:30 AEST | D. Petratos 32'; Maclaren 36'; Henrique 88' | Report | Hološko 24', 87' | Stadium: Suncorp Stadium; Attendance: 14,897; Referee: Shaun Evans |

| 2 April 2016 26 | Sydney FC | 0–2 | Adelaide United | Sydney |
| 19:30 AEDT | | Report | Djite 26', 45' | Stadium: Allianz Stadium; Attendance: 8,981; Referee: Peter Green |

| 10 April 2016 27 | Sydney FC | 4–0 | Perth Glory | Sydney |
| 17:00 AEST | Carney 30'; Hološko 36' (yellow card) 55' (yellow-red card) 78'; Abbas 85'; Ninković 90+1' | Report | | Stadium: Allianz Stadium; Attendance: 8,717; Referee: Ben Williams |

=== FFA Cup ===
| 5 August 2015 Round of 32 | Sorrento FC (Western Australia) | 0–2 | (New South Wales) Sydney FC | Perth, Australia |
| 20:30 AEST | | Report | Smeltz 3' (pen.); Burgess 75' | Stadium: nib Stadium; Attendance: 3,485; Referee: Adam Fielding |

| 26 August 2015 Round of 16 | Adelaide United (South Australia) | 2–1 (a.e.t.) | (New South Wales) Sydney FC | Adelaide, Australia |
| 19:30 AEST | Sánchez 40'; McGowan 114', (red card) 116' | Report | Grant 16' | Stadium: Coopers Stadium; Attendance: 5,066; Referee: Shaun Evans |

=== AFC Champions League ===
==== Group stage ====
| Pos | Team | Pld | W | D | L | GF | GA | GD | Pts | Qualification |
|---|---|---|---|---|---|---|---|---|---|---|
| 1 | (Australia) Sydney FC | 6 | 3 | 1 | 2 | 4 | 4 | 0 | 10 | Advance to knockout stage |
| 2 | (Japan) Urawa Red Diamonds | 6 | 2 | 3 | 1 | 6 | 4 | +2 | 9 | Advance to knockout stage |
| 3 | (China) Guangzhou Evergrande | 6 | 2 | 2 | 2 | 6 | 5 | +1 | 8 | |
| 4 | (South Korea) Pohang Steelers | 6 | 1 | 2 | 3 | 2 | 5 | −3 | 5 | |

Source: AFC
Rules for classification: Group stage tiebreakers

| 24 February 2016 1 | Urawa Red Diamonds (Japan) | 2–0 | (Australia) Sydney FC | Saitama, Japan |
| 19:30 JST | Muto 8'; Koroki 65' (pen.) | Report | | Stadium: Saitama Stadium; Attendance: 19,500; Referee: Ali Sabah (Iraq) |

| 2 March 2016 2 | Sydney FC (Australia) | 2–1 | (China) Guangzhou Evergrande Taobao | Sydney, Australia |
| 20:00 AEDT | Stambolziev 18'; Dimitrijević 89' | Report | Calver 25' (o.g.) | Stadium: Sydney Football Stadium; Attendance: 18,149; Referee: Alireza Faghani (Iran) |

| 16 March 2016 3 | Pohang Steelers (South Korea) | 0–1 | (Australia) Sydney FC | Pohang, South Korea |
| 19:30 KST | | Report | Naumoff 41' | Stadium: Pohang Steel Yard; Attendance: 4,247; Referee: Fahad Al-Mirdasi (Saudi Arabia) |

| 5 April 2016 4 | Sydney FC (Australia) | 1–0 | (South Korea) Pohang Steelers | Sydney, Australia |
| 20:00 AEST | Ninković 51' | Report | | Stadium: Sydney Football Stadium; Attendance: 5,642; Referee: Mohsen Torky (Iran) |

| 20 April 2016 5 | Sydney FC (Australia) | 0–0 | (Japan) Urawa Red Diamonds | Sydney, Australia |
| 20:00 AEST | | Report | | Stadium: Sydney Football Stadium; Attendance: 8,803; Referee: Muhammad Taqi (Singapore) |

| 3 May 2016 6 | Guangzhou Evergrande Taobao (China) | 1–0 | (Australia) Sydney FC | Guangzhou, China |
| 18:30 CST | Gao Lin 2' | Report | | Stadium: Tianhe Stadium; Attendance: 33,517; Referee: Nawaf Shukralla (Bahrain) |

==== Round of 16 ====
| 18 May 2016 First leg | Shandong Luneng Taishan (China) | 1–1 | Sydney FC (Australia) | Jinan, China |
| 19:30 CST | Tardelli 57' | Report | Carney 15' | Stadium: Jinan Olympic Sports Center Stadium; Attendance: 16,917; Referee: Abdulrahman Al-Jassim (Qatar) |

| 25 May 2016 Second leg | Sydney FC (Australia) | 2–2 (3–3 agg.) | Shandong Luneng Taishan (China) | Sydney, Australia |
| 20:00 AEST | O'Neill 2'; Grant 46'; Anderson (red card) 76' | Report | Montillo 12'; Hao 90' | Stadium: Sydney Football Stadium; Attendance: 9,451; Referee: Ilgiz Tantashev (Uzbekistan) |

== End-of-season awards ==
On 6 May, 2016, Sydney FC hosted their annual Sky Blue Ball and presented eight awards on the night.

| Award | Men's | Women's | Youth |
|---|---|---|---|
| Player of the Year | Matthew Jurman | N/A | |
| Player's Player of the Year | Matthew Jurman | Alanna Kennedy | Daniel Araujo |
| Member's Player of the Year | Matthew Jurman | N/A | |
| Golden Boot | Filip Holosko | Kyah Simon | N/A |
| Chairman's Award | David Warriner (General Manager Digital, Media and Communications) | | |
