= Chris Naumoff =

Australian soccer player

Personal information
- Full name: Christopher Naumoff
- Date of birth: 29 June 1995 (age 31)
- Place of birth: Sydney, Australia
- Height: 1.82 m (6 ft 0 in)
- Position: Winger

Youth career
- Menai Hawks
- Sutherland Sharks
- Marconi Stallions
- Sutherland Sharks
- 2011–2014: Sydney FC

Senior career*
Years	Team	Apps	(Gls)
2012–2013	Sutherland Sharks	17	(3)
2013–2016	Sydney FC	44	(2)
Total		61	(5)

International career^{‡}
2013–2015	Australia U-20	10	(0)
2015	Australia U-23	4	(0)

Managerial career
- 2026–: Sutherland Sharks U20 (coach)
- * Club domestic league appearances and goals as of 26 May 2016 ‡ National team caps and goals as of 4 July 2016

Christopher Naumoff (born 29 June 1995) is a retired Australian professional football (soccer) player who played as a winger for Sutherland Sharks in the NPL and for Sydney FC in the A-League.

Born in Sydney, Naumoff played youth football for Sutherland Sharks, eventually playing for the first team in the National Premier Leagues NSW before moving to Sydney FC's senior side in 2014. He made over 50 appearances for Sydney before leaving the club in 2016. Soon after, Naumoff agreed to a deal with Spanish side Numancia, but was found in medical testing to have a heart disease, hypertrophic cardiomyopathy, which led to the cancellation of the contract and Naumoff's subsequent retirement as a health precaution.

Naumoff represented the Australian under-20 and under-23 sides on several occasions.

== Early life ==
Naumoff was born to a Macedonian mother born in Smilevo in the Demir Hisar Municipality, and a Macedonian Australian father, whose parents hail from Capari near Bitola. He is a Macedonian Orthodox Christian.

== Club career ==
=== Sydney FC ===
Naumoff joined Sydney FC's youth team from New South Wales Premier League outfit Sutherland Sharks in 2011 after winning the Under 20s Championship and being crowned the Under 20s Premier League Player of the Year 2012. Having had a strong pre-season under Frank Farina where he scored 5 goals, Naumoff was handed his senior debut at home to the Newcastle Jets in Round 1 of the 2013–14 season where Sydney FC won 2–0. On 15 November 2013, Naumoff made his starting debut for Sydney FC against Melbourne Heart at AAMI Park. His first A-League goal was against the Central Coast Mariners on 24 January 2015. On 16 March 2016, Naumoff scored the winning goal in a 1–0 against Pohang Steelers in the Asian Champions League. He has participated in various community activities for the club, including training sessions with local club Curl Curl Acdamy. At the conclusion of the 2015–16 season, Naumoff was not offered a new contract with Sydney FC.

=== Numancia and retirement ===
On 16 June 2016, Naumoff agreed to a three-year deal with Spanish Segunda División side Numancia The deal was later cancelled after Naumoff failed a medical examination.

Following further testing, Naumoff was diagnosed with hypertrophic cardiomyopathy (HCM). On 4 July 2016, he announced his retirement from professional football at the age of 21 for health reasons but stated his wish to stay involved in the game. Professional Footballers Australia announced that they would continue to support Naumoff.

== Management career ==
Naumoff joined Rockdale City Suns as a youth coach in late 2016, and also flagged an intention to start an academy of his own, which he has subsequently done. He also currently coaches Sydney Grammar School.

== Career statistics ==
As of 26 May 2016

Club	Season	League			FFA Cup		ACL		Total	
Club	Season	Division	Apps	Goals	Apps	Goals	Apps	Goals	Apps	Goals
Sutherland Sharks	2012	NSW Premier League	0	0	0	0	0	0	0	0
Sutherland Sharks	2013	National Premier Leagues NSW	17	3	2	0	0	0	19	3
Sutherland Sharks	Sharks total		17	3	2	0	0	0	19	3
Sydney FC	2013–14	A-League	10	0	0	0	0	0	10	0
Sydney FC	2014–15	A-League	24	2	3	2	0	0	27	4
Sydney FC	2015–16	A-League	10	0	2	0	6	1	18	1
Sydney FC	Sydney total		44	2	5	2	6	1	55	5
Career total			61	5	7	2	6	1	74	8

== Honours ==
=== Club ===
Sydney FC

- National Youth League: 2013–14

=== Individual ===
- NSW Premier League Grade 20 Player of the Season: 2012

== See also ==
- List of Sydney FC players
