= Lee Russell (footballer) =

English footballer

Personal information
- Full name: Lee Edward Russell
- Date of birth: 3 September 1969 (age 57)
- Place of birth: Southampton, England
- Position: Defender

Senior career*
Years	Team	Apps	(Gls)
1988–1998	Portsmouth	123	(3)
1994–1995	→ Bournemouth (loan)	3	(0)
1998–2003	Torquay United	82	(0)
- Forest Green Rovers
Total		208	(5)
- * Club domestic league appearances and goals

Lee Edward Russell (born 3 September 1969) is an English former footballer who played in the Football League for Bournemouth, Portsmouth and Torquay United.
