= List of Sydney FC players =

Football players' list

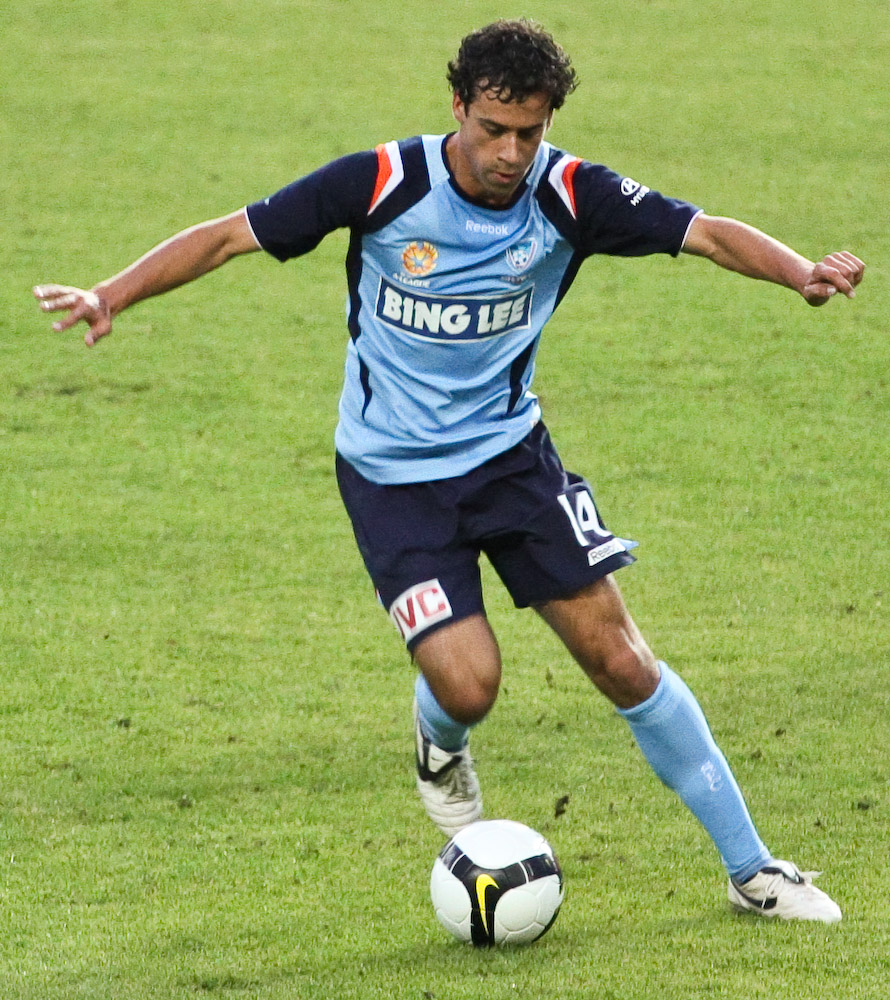
Alex Brosque is Sydney FC's highest all-time goalscorer.

Sydney Football Club is an association football club based in Moore Park, Sydney, who was formed in 2004. They became the first member from Sydney admitted into the A-League Men in 2005.

Rhyan Grant holds the record for the greatest number of appearances for Sydney FC with 405 games. Alex Brosque holds the goalscoring record with 83 goals.

== Key ==
- The list is ordered first by date of debut, and then if necessary in alphabetical order.
- Appearances as a substitute are included.
- Statistics are correct up to and including the match played on 13 December 2025. Where a player left the club permanently after this date, his statistics are updated to his date of leaving.

Nationality
Unless otherwise noted, the nationality of a player is determined by the country/countries which he has played for, or if said person has not played international football, their country of birth.
Position
Playing positions are listed according to the tactical formations that were employed at the time.
Club career
Club career is defined as the first and last calendar years in which the player appeared for the club in any of the competitions listed below.
Total appearances and Total goals
Total appearances and goals comprise those in the A-League Men, Australia Cup, AFC Champions League, AFC Champions League Two, OFC Champions League, Pre-Season Challenge Cup, FIFA Club World Cup and the Pan-Pacific Championship

== Players ==
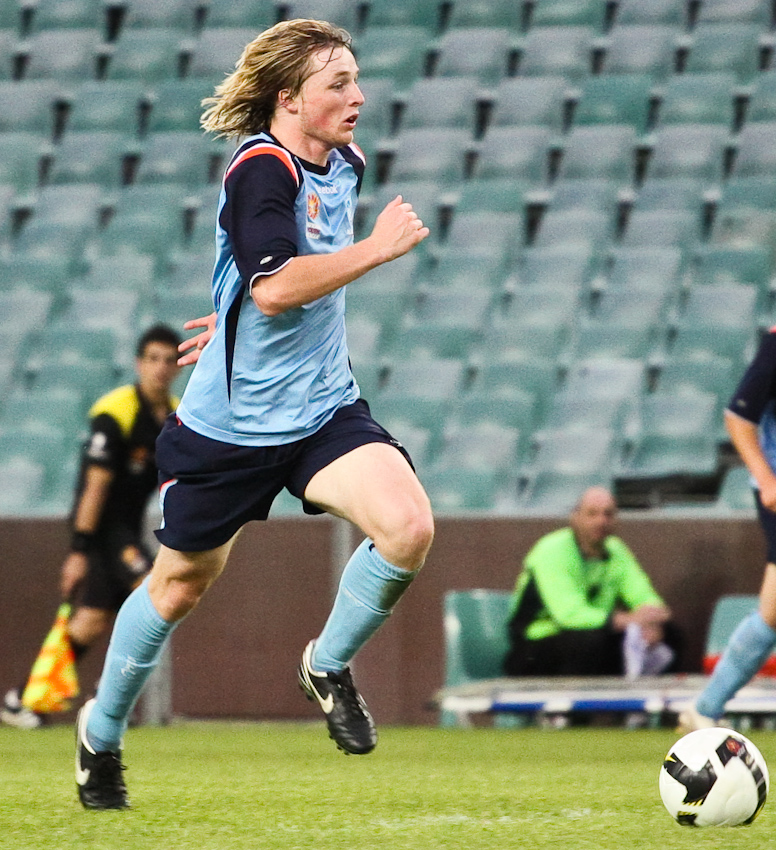
Rhyan Grant, who lies first in the all-time appearance list with 385 and has scored 20 goals from 2008.

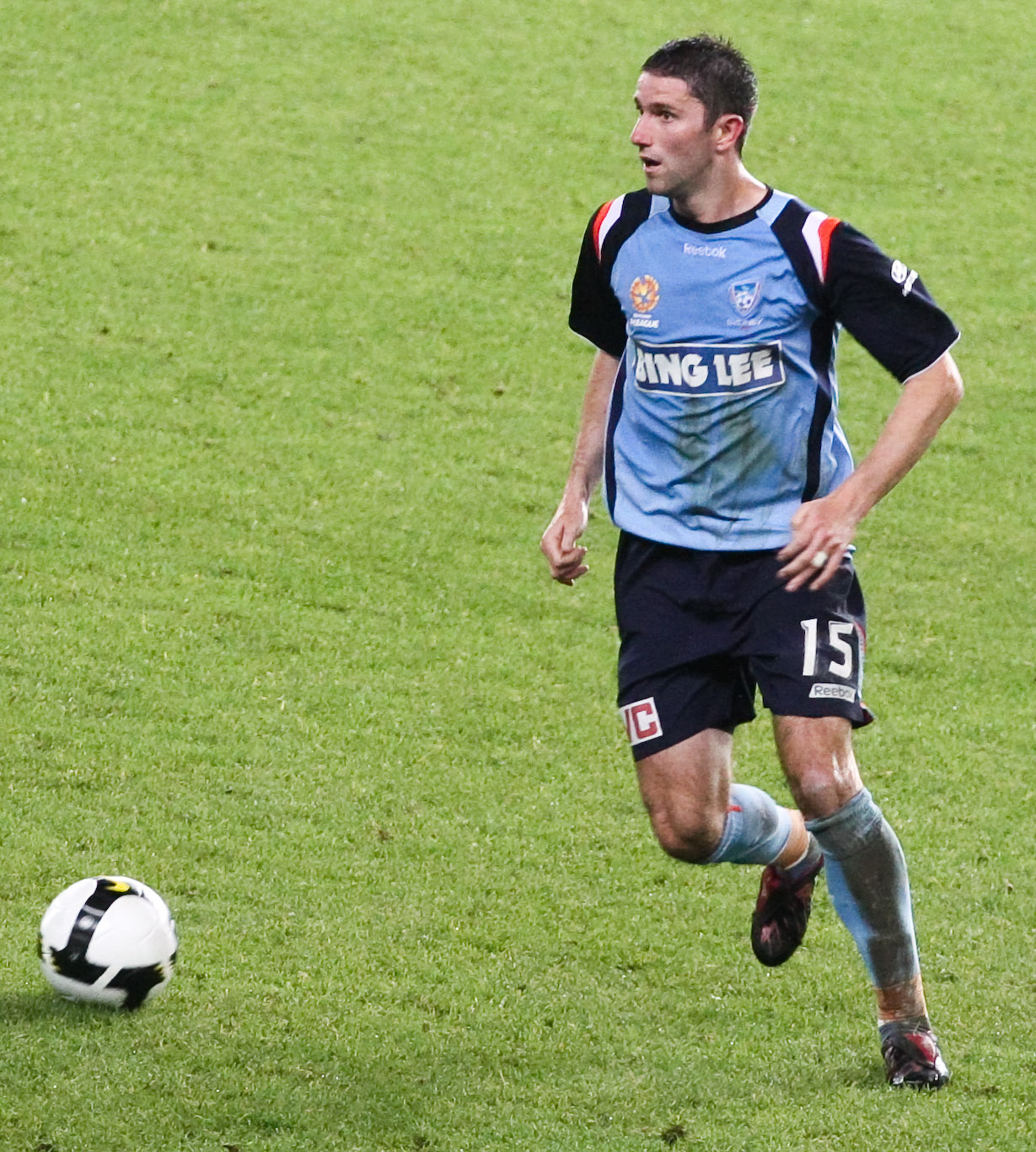
Terry McFlynn made 214 appearances and was the club's first foreign captain from 2010 to 2013.

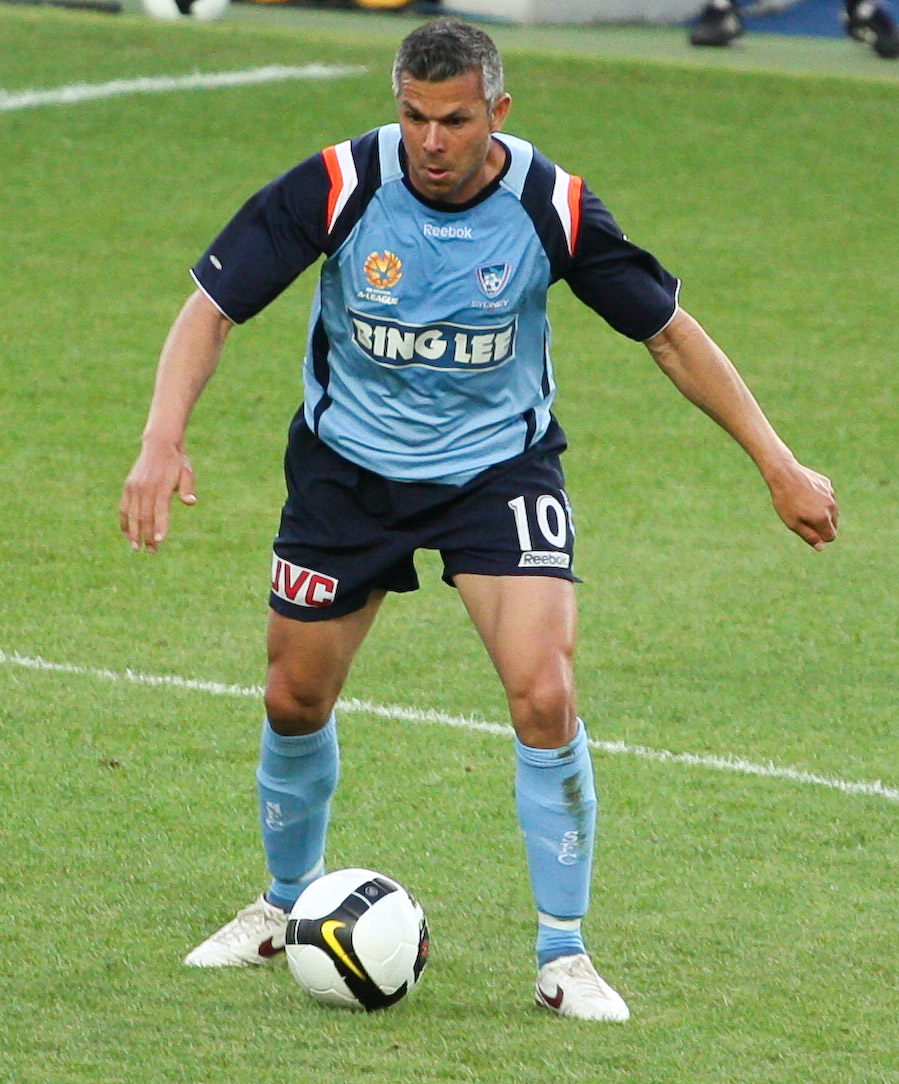
Steve Corica played 139 games for Sydney FC and managed the club from 2018 to 2023.

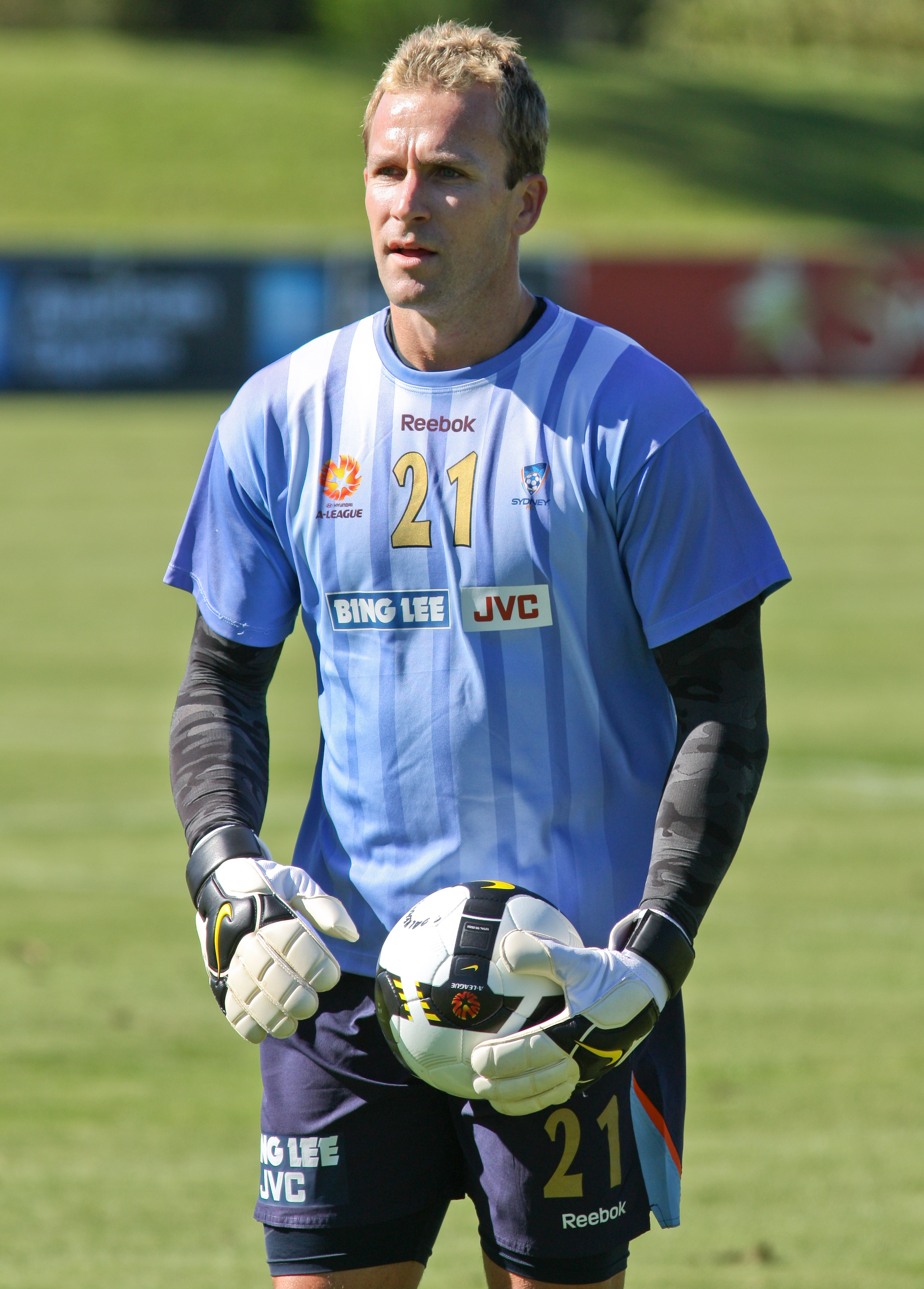
Clint Bolton has the second highest number of matches played for a goalkeeper with 142 games.

Players highlighted in bold are still actively playing at Sydney FC.

As of 26 April 2026

List of Sydney FC players with at least 100 appearances
Player	Nationality	Pos	Club career	Starts	Subs	Total	Goals
Player	Nationality	Pos	Club career	Appearances			Goals
Clint Bolton	Australia	GK	2005–2010	142	0	142	0
David Carney	Australia	FW	2005–2007; 2016–2018	100	37	137	27
Steve Corica	Australia	FW	2005–2010	125	14	139	31
Iain Fyfe	Australia	DF	2005–2009	118	4	122	6
Terry McFlynn	Northern Ireland	MF	2005–2014	193	21	214	7
Alex Brosque	Australia	FW	2006–2011; 2014–2019	239	28	267	83
Vedran Janjetović	Australia	GK	2012–2017	112	0	112	0
Matthew Jurman	Australia	DF	2008–2011; 2013–2017	97	21	118	3
**Rhyan Grant**	Australia	DF	2008–	365	40	405	20
Sebastian Ryall	Australia	DF	2009–2018	146	43	189	12
Miloš Ninković	Serbia	MF	2015–2022	196	25	221	41
Brandon O'Neill	Australia	MF	2015–2019	136	9	145	10
Joshua Brillante	Australia	MF	2016–2019	101	3	104	3
Alex Wilkinson	Australia	DF	2016–2023	219	2	221	3
Michael Zullo	Australia	DF	2016–2022	102	8	110	2
Bobô	Brazil	FW	2016–2018; 2021–2022	90	30	120	71
Andrew Redmayne	Australia	GK	2017–2025	236	2	238	0
Paulo Retre	Australia	MF	2017–2023	127	49	176	4
David Robson	England	FW	2004-2006	89	13	101	73
Anthony Caceres	Australia	MF	2019–2025	190	25	215	18
**Joel King**	Australia	DF	2019–2022; 2023–	125	34	159	4
Luke Brattan	Australia	MF	2019–2024	115	4	119	3
**Joe Lolley**	England	FW	2022–	105	7	112	36
**Patrick Wood**	Australia	FW	2020–	34	81	115	20

== Captains ==
Nine players have captained Sydney FC since it was founded in 2004, the first being Mark Rudan, who captained the team until 2007. The club's longest-serving captain is Alex Brosque, who captained the club for five years between 2014 and 2019. The current captain is Rhyan Grant.

Dates	Captain
2005–2007	(Australia) Mark Rudan
2007–2008	(Australia) Tony Popovic
2008–2010	(Australia) Steve Corica
2010–2013	(Northern Ireland) Terry McFlynn
2013–2014	(Italy) Alessandro Del Piero
2014–2019	(Australia) Alex Brosque
2019–2023	(Australia) Alex Wilkinson
2023–2024	(Australia) Luke Brattan
2024–present	(Australia) Rhyan Grant
