= David Robson =

David Robson may refer to:

- David Robson (footballer, born 1873), Scottish footballer
- David Robson (footballer, born 1970), English footballer
- David Robson (footballer, born 2002), Welsh football goalkeeper
- David Robson (playwright), American playwright
